= History of Tokyo Verdy =

History of Japanese football club Tokyo Verdy

The history of Tokyo Verdy, a Japanese football club founded in 1969, can be divided into two main periods: the first, from its foundation until 1992, during which the club, named Yomiuri Football Club and operating under amateur status, established itself as one of the most important entities in the Japanese football context by adopting innovative business strategies and winning a large number of national trophies. The second, in which the team, after turning professional under the name Verdy Kawasaki and an initial period of success, experienced a decline in results due to a series of unsuccessful business decisions (including a change of venue in 2001, which resulted in the club being renamed Tokyo Verdy).

== Amateur era ==
=== Founding and early championships ===
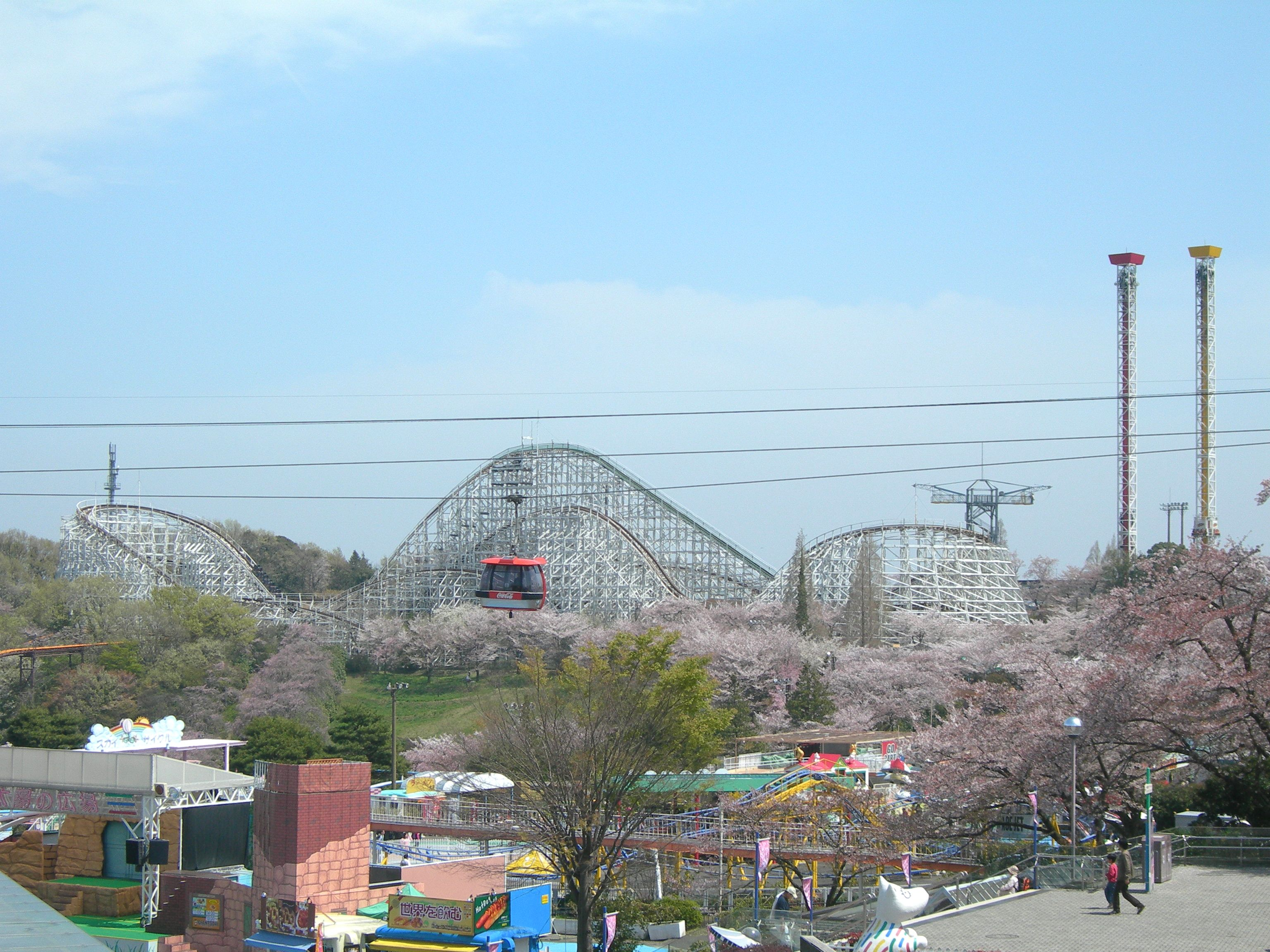
View of Yomiuriland, where the first home stadium of the Yomiuri Football Club was located.

The club's origins date back to November 1968: following the Japanese national team's third place finish at the Mexico City Olympics, the president of the Japan Football Association, Ken Nozu, decided to further promote the development of soccer in Japan, which was still little followed by the general public and played at an amateur level by teams consisting of employees of large companies or university students. To achieve this goal, Nozu approached Matsutaro Shoriki, president of the Yomiuri Publishing Group, which controlled the eponymous and emblematic baseball team, and asked him to create a team that would introduce the concept of professional sports.

The company immediately took action by setting up an area within its amusement park to host soccer games, and began building a team at the end of the soccer season by recruiting a large portion of the University of Tokyo soccer team, including coach Toshiro Narita. The new club, founded on January 3, 1969 under the name NTV Soccer Club (日本テレビサッカー部), officially debuted in October of that year in Group A of the Tokyo Prefectural League, which was then part of a league system that represented the fourth tier of the national soccer system. Playing a 4-4-2 formation with captain Munehiro Shibata as their key player, the team, which adopted the name Yomiuri Football Club (読売サッカークラブ) for the 1970 season, played three championships at the top of the prefectural and regional leagues before joining the newly formed second division of the Japan Soccer League in 1971.

=== The rise to the first division ===
After a transitional season in which the team remained mid-table throughout the league, the company finally initiated its team development policy by appointing Frans van Balkom as coach and George Yonashiro as an observer: By including numerous players from high school teams (such as Yasutarō Matsuki, Yukitaka Omi and Toshiki Okajima, the latter the top scorer in the second division for three consecutive years) or foreign nationals (mainly Dutch or Japanese-Brazilian) in the team, the European coach significantly improved the team's results, which in the following seasons lost promotion to the inter-divisional playoffs. The final promotion came in the 1977 season, with Shōichi Nishimura (who had replaced van Balkom in 1976) at the technical helm, and with a roster that included newcomer Ruy Ramos, discovered by Yonashiro: after dominating the league, Yomiuri defeated Toyota Motors in the playoffs to earn a ticket to the first division.

=== Early trophies ===
Since its debut season in the top flight in 1978, Yomiuri has established itself as one of the top teams, first finishing in fourth place after a strong second half of the season and then emerging as Fujita Kogyo's main opponent in the 1979 title race. In the latter season, the team also had a chance to win its first trophy, winning the fourth edition of the Japan Soccer League Cup: after eliminating Yanmar Diesel in the first round, Yomiuri defeated two second-division teams in the following rounds, and then landed in the final against Furukawa Electric, which they won 3-2. Crucial to this season were the contributions of striker Okajima and Brazilians Ramos (top scorer at the end of the championship) and Jairo Matos (named in the tournament's best XI for the second year in a row).

After three seasons of mixed results (in which they achieved mid-table finishes, with the exception of the 1981 season in which the team became Fujita Kogyo's main rival for the title and lost the Emperor's Cup after being defeated in the final by Nippon Kokan) and changes in technical leadership, Yomiuri, bolstered by the arrival of other foreign players such as Steve Paterson, won its first national title in 1983 after a neck-and-neck race with Nissan Motors that was decided on a head-to-head match. This success was repeated the following season; at the end of the season, the team led by Rudi Gutendorf won both the championship and its first Emperor's Cup against Furukawa Electric.

=== International recognition ===
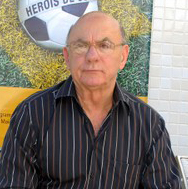
Dino Sani was the technical director of the team that won the national title in the 1986-1987 season.

At the end of the 1985-1986 season, in which the team, while winning its second league cup, aimed to avoid relegation, the management decided to hire George Yonashiro as coach, with Dino Sani as technical director. Yonashiro took advantage of regulatory changes that allowed the signing of professional footballers to overhaul the squad and his first result was winning the national cup; a few months later, the team won its third national title, beating Nippon Kokan on goal difference. This result allowed the team to qualify for the 1987-1988 edition of the Asian Club Championship: after surviving the preliminary round by overcoming the deficit accumulated in the first leg against Hong Kong-based South China, Yomiuri won the semifinals on goal difference against Kuala Lumpur, who had also won the head-to-head match. The final, which would have pitted Yomiuri against Al-Hilal, was not played due to the withdrawal of the Saudis: Yomiuri won the match by forfeit to claim their first international title. Winning this title was preceded by winning the National Cup for the second year in a row, defeating Mazda 2-0.

After a transitional season in which Yomiuri finished no higher than fifth in the league, the team's management appointed Carlos Alberto Silva as coach, and the team's results immediately improved, so much so that in the following tournament they were the protagonists of a heated neck-and-neck battle with Nissan Motors, this time decided in favor of the latter, who defeated Yomiuri on the road. Strengthened by the arrival of Kazuyoshi Miura from Santos, Yomiuri won the last two editions of the Japan Soccer League and the last edition of the Japan Soccer League Cup: During this period, a rebuilding process was initiated (including the merger with the reserve team, which had performed well in the last two editions of the second division of the Japan Soccer League), which projected the club towards professionalism as early as October 1991.

== Professional era ==
=== The successes of the early 1990s ===
Joining the J.League under the official name of Yomiuri Nihon (読売日本) and based in Kawasaki, the team made its debut in professional soccer by winning the first edition of the Yamazaki Nabisco Cup, which was played as a preparatory tournament for the league: A few months later, strengthened by the acquisition of several Brazilian and Dutch players, and with Yasutarō Matsuki as coach, the team made its debut in the new football tournament under the name Verdy Kawasaki (ヴェルディ川崎), although the name Yomiuri Verdy (読売ヴェルディ) appeared in the official logo. In the first two editions (1993 and 1994) of the tournament, the team continued to confirm itself as the champion of Japan: after winning the second phase of the tournament in both seasons, Verdy Kawasaki gained access to the final, where it prevailed at the expense of Kashima Antlers and Sanfrecce Hiroshima. At the same time, the team defended its League Cup title by defeating Shimizu S-Pulse in 1993 and Júbilo Iwata in 1994.

=== Decline and change of venue ===
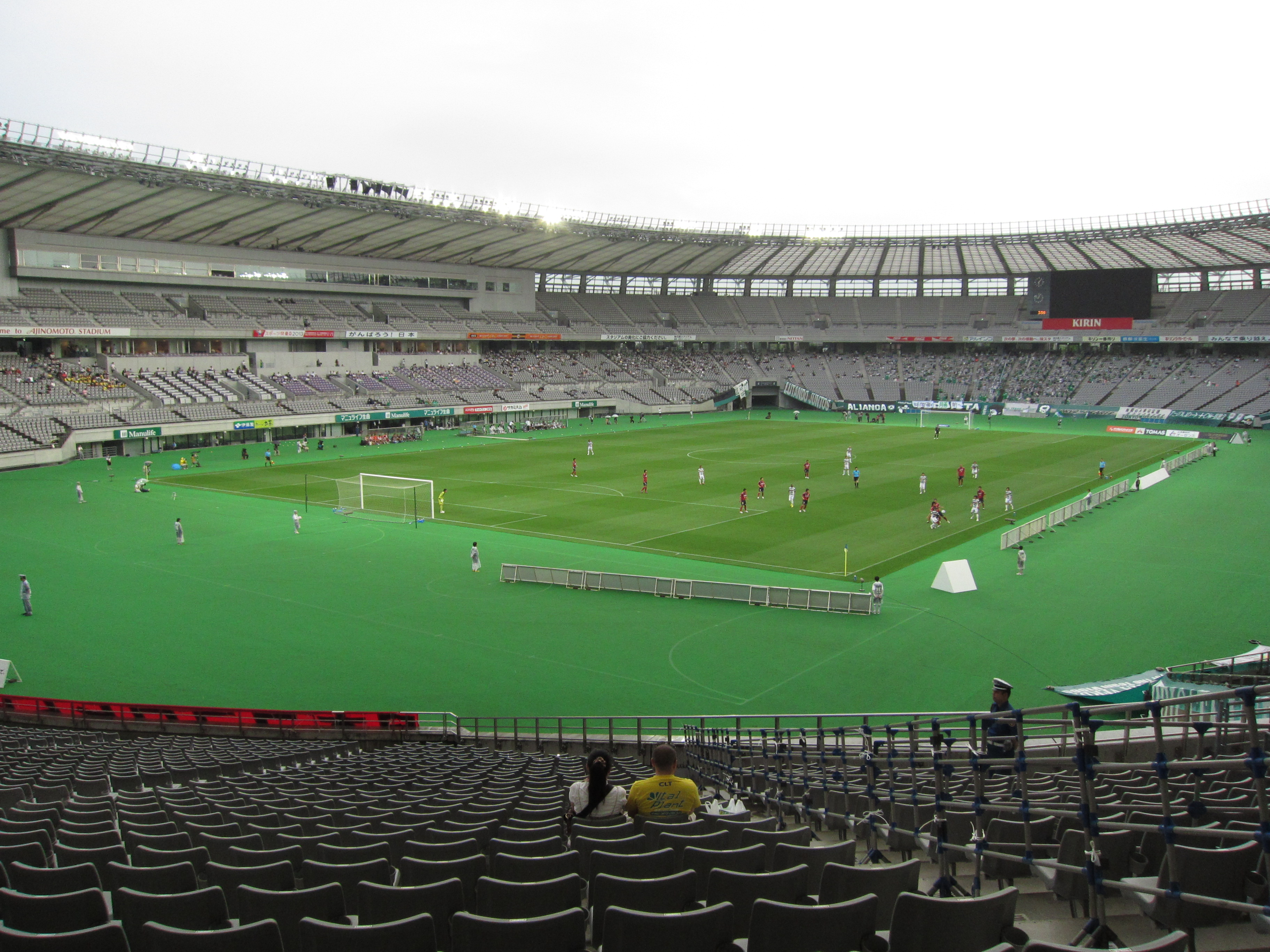
Ajinomoto Stadium, where Tokyo Verdy have played their home games since 2001.

Even after the mid-1990s, Verdy Kawasaki remained a top team, reaching the final of the 1995 championship (where they were defeated by Yokohama Marinos) and winning the 1996 edition of the Emperor's Cup, but the latter season saw the first signs of a decline in performance that would affect the team in the years to come. With the goal of creating a team that could boast a nationwide following, the management continued to confirm en bloc the same starting lineup of talented but aging players (such as Ruy Ramos, Shinkichi Kikuchi, and Tetsuji Hashiratani). Dwindling attendance and some tensions with the J. League management (with whom the club clashed over the use of the name Yomiuri as the team's official name, which was only discontinued in 1996 after the federation approved a decree prohibiting the use of company names) threw the club into chaos, to the point that Verdy Kawasaki had two low finishes in 1997-1998, finishing fifteenth and twelfth in the overall standings, and changed four coaches in one year.

In order to save the club from heavy debts, Yomiuri entrusted the financial package to Nippon Television, which decided to freshen up the roster by starting again with youngsters from the Japan Football League: this move had the effect of improving the team's results (they finished sixth in 1999, having come close to reaching the finals in the first round), but did not solve the dwindling attendance. Fearing that Kawasaki Frontale's entry into the professional league would lead to a further loss of spectators, the management decided to move the team's headquarters to Tokyo: at the end of the 2000 season, which ended with a mid-table finish, the club moved to the Chōfu district (located in the west of the capital) and adopted the name Tokyo Verdy 1969 (東京ヴェルディ1969). This decision only partially solved the problem of attendance, given the presence of FC Tokyo, which already had a good following among the public (including Verdy fans who disagreed with the move to Tokyo), and the disastrous results achieved in the first season under the new name (after spending the first stage at the bottom of the table, Tokyo Verdy managed to save themselves with the help of Edmundo).

=== Relegation to the second division ===
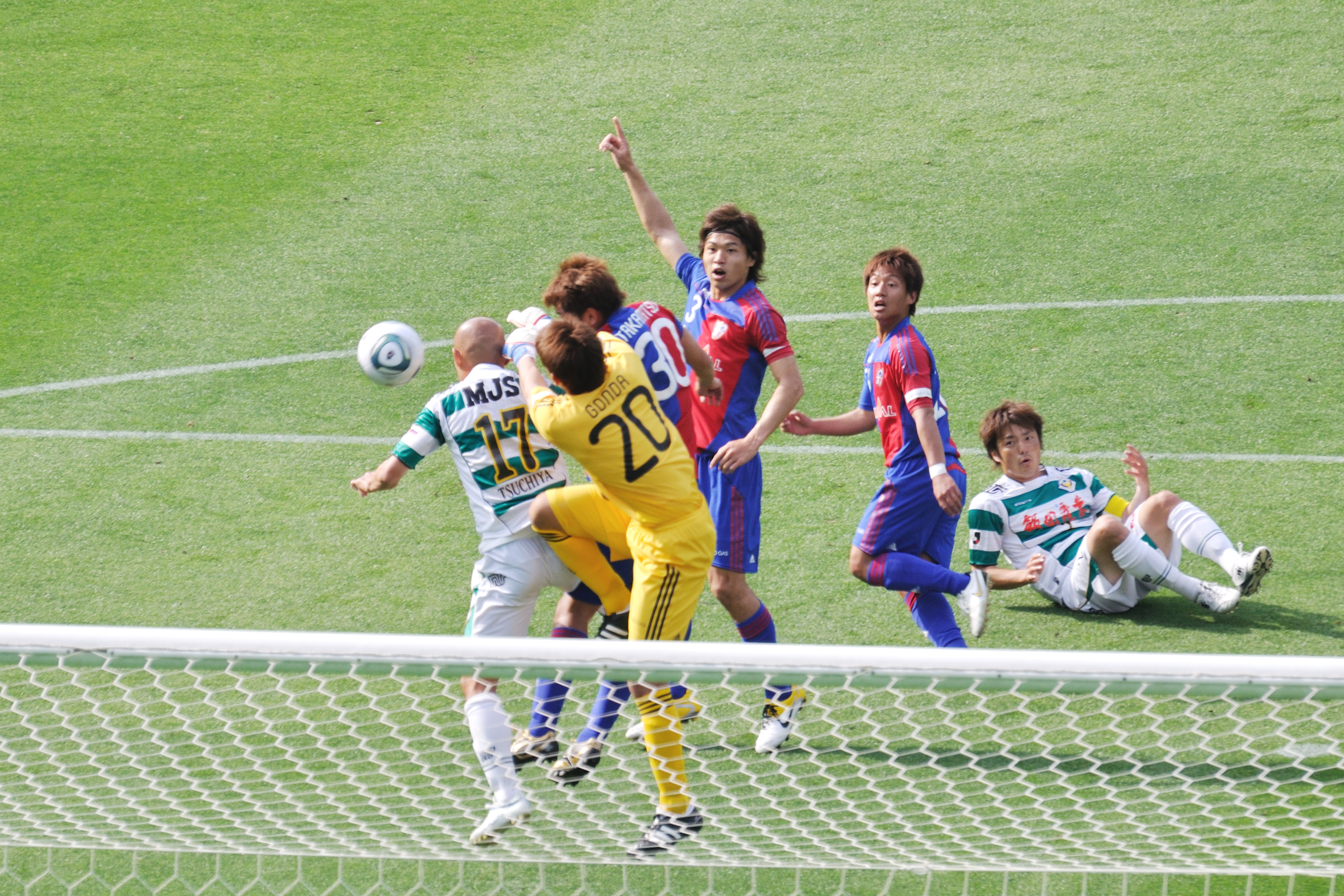
Derby against FC Tokyo on May 4, 2011.

A turning point seemed to come at the end of the 2004 season, when the team under Osvaldo Ardiles won their first trophies in nine years, beating Júbilo Iwata in the final of the Emperor's Cup and then defeating national champions Yokohama F. Marinos in the Super Cup. In the following championship, however, the team was unable to climb out of the bottom half of the standings, despite Washington's 22 goals and several coaching changes. At the end of the season, Tokyo Verdy finished in last place, relegated after twenty-eight years in the top flight. This result threw the club back into financial difficulties: in the 2006 season, the team, coached by Ruy Ramos and made up of players forced to take pay cuts, was never in contention for promotion and immediately exited the AFC Champions League, losing in Group F, where they were pitted against Ulsan Hyundai.

The return to the top flight came the following season: with Ramos confirmed as coach, the team achieved second place by relying on young players (including Hulk, who became the league's top scorer with 36 goals). After the club's name was changed to Tokyo Verdy at the beginning of the year and Tetsuji Hashiratani was hired as coach, the team seemed to be on the road to recovery, despite some hesitation, until the management released a list of players to be released at the end of the season with two games remaining. The team's morale suffered, and by losing their last two matches, the club fell to the second-last position, which meant direct relegation: this result, together with the protests of the fans, triggered a further outbreak of the club's crisis, which culminated in September 2009 with the decision of the Yomiuri Group to put the club up for sale after 40 years of ownership.

The club was taken over by a company called Tokyo Verdy Holdings, led by a number of former players (including Ruy Ramos, Kazuyoshi and Yasutoshi Miura, and Tetsuji Hashiratani): thanks to the signing of agreements with sponsor Xebio, Tokyo Verdy (which had failed to achieve its goal of early promotion to the top flight) was saved from bankruptcy. In the two seasons following the change of ownership, despite losing some key players in the transfer window, the team stabilized in positions close to the promotion zone.

== See also ==
- 2023 Tokyo Verdy season

== Bibliography ==
- The Complete History of Japan Soccer League, 1965-1992 (日本サッカーリーグ全史 1965-1992) (in Japanese). 1993.
- "クラブサッカーの始祖鳥 読売クラブ～ヴェルディの40年" [The forerunner of club football: Yomiuri Club - 40 years of Verdy]. Archived from the original on July 14, 2014.
- 天国と地獄—ラモス瑠偉のサッカー戦記 [Heaven and Hell: Rui Ramos' Soccer Diary] (in Japanese). 文春文庫. ISBN 4167159058.
