= 1985 in Japanese football =

1985 season

Japanese football in 1985

== Japan Soccer League ==
=== Division 1 ===
Pos	Team	Pld	W	D	L	GF	GA	GD	Pts	Qualification or relegation
1	Furukawa Electric	22	15	5	2	40	15	+25	35	Champions
2	Nippon Kokan	22	13	2	7	39	22	+17	28	
3	Honda	22	8	12	2	30	20	+10	28	
4	Fujita Engineering	22	9	8	5	31	17	+14	26	
5	Nissan	22	8	8	6	23	29	−6	24	
6	Yamaha Motors	22	9	5	8	20	21	−1	23	
7	Mitsubishi Motors	22	8	6	8	29	19	+10	22	
8	Hitachi	22	8	5	9	26	33	−7	21	
9	Yomiuri	22	7	5	10	28	31	−3	19	
10	Yanmar Diesel	22	6	6	10	20	27	−7	18	
11	Sumitomo	22	6	3	13	21	32	−11	15	Relegated to Second Division
12	ANA Yokohama	22	2	1	19	16	57	−41	5	Relegated to Second Division

=== Division 2 ===
==== First stage ====
===== East =====
Pos	Team	Pld	W	D	L	GF	GA	GD	Pts
1	Toyota Motors	10	8	1	1	23	6	+17	17
2	Toshiba	10	6	1	3	12	7	+5	13
3	Kofu Club	10	5	0	5	22	16	+6	10
4	Fujitsu	10	4	2	4	16	12	+4	10
5	Seino Transportation	10	3	2	5	13	21	−8	8
6	TDK	10	0	2	8	10	34	−24	2

===== West =====
Pos	Team	Pld	W	D	L	GF	GA	GD	Pts
1	Matsushita Electric	10	8	2	0	26	6	+20	18
2	Tanabe Pharmaceuticals	10	6	1	3	13	8	+5	13
3	Mazda	10	5	2	3	14	10	+4	12
4	Nippon Steel	10	5	1	4	18	9	+9	11
5	Kyoto Prefectural Police	10	2	0	8	3	28	−25	4
6	Osaka Gas	10	1	0	9	8	21	−13	2

==== Second stage ====
===== Promotion Group =====
Pos	Team	Pld	W	D	L	GF	GA	GD	Pts	Promotion
1	Matsushita Electric	10	8	1	1	23	6	+17	17	Promoted to First Division
2	Mazda	10	6	1	3	12	7	+5	13	Promoted to First Division
3	Toshiba	10	5	0	5	22	16	+6	10	
4	Kofu Club	10	4	2	4	16	12	+4	10	
5	Tanabe Pharmaceuticals	10	3	2	5	13	21	−8	8	
6	Toyota Motors	10	0	2	8	10	34	−24	2	

===== Relegation Group =====
====== East ======
Pos	Team	Pld	W	D	L	GF	GA	GD	Pts
1	Fujitsu	4	4	0	0	17	2	+15	8
2	Seino Transportation	4	1	1	2	5	8	−3	3
3	TDK	4	0	1	3	2	14	−12	1

====== West ======
Pos	Team	Pld	W	D	L	GF	GA	GD	Pts
1	Nippon Steel	5	3	1	1	9	2	+7	7
2	Kyoto Prefectural Police	4	1	1	2	4	7	−3	3
3	Osaka Gas	4	1	0	3	6	10	−4	2

====== 7-12 Playoff ======
Pos	East	Score	West
7–8	Fujitsu	0-1	Nippon Steel
9–10	Seino Transportation	1-0	Kyoto Prefectural Police
11–12	TDK	1-2	Osaka Gas

== Emperor's Cup ==
January 1, 1986

Nissan Motors	2–0	Fujita Industries
? (?) ? (?)

National Stadium

== National team ==
=== Results ===
1985.02.23	Japan	3–1	Singapore	Singapore
	Kimura 10'; Hashiratani 47'; Hara 57'	JFA	? (?)

1985.03.21	Japan	1–0	North Korea	Tokyo, Japan
	Hara 20'	JFA		Stadium: Tokyo National Stadium

1985.04.30	Japan	0–0	North Korea	Pyongyang, North Korea
		JFA

1985.05.18	Japan	5–0	Singapore	Tokyo, Japan
	Mizunuma 48'; Nishimura 57', 59'; Hara 79'; Kimura 86'	JFA		Stadium: Tokyo National Stadium

1985.05.26	Japan	1–4	Uruguay	Tokyo, Japan
	Kimura 15'	JFA	? (?) ? (?) ? (?) ? (?)	Stadium: Tokyo National Stadium

1985.06.04	Japan	3–0	Malaysia	Aichi, Japan
	Hashiratani 30'; Mizunuma 69'; Kimura 89'	JFA		Stadium: Mizuho Athletic Stadium

1985.08.11	Japan	3–0	Hong Kong	Hyōgo, Japan
	Kimura 10'; Hara 11'; Mizunuma 53'	JFA		Stadium: Kobe Universiade Memorial Stadium

1985.09.22	Japan	2–1	Hong Kong	Hong Kong
	Kimura 44'; Hara 89'	JFA	? (?)	Attendance: 28,000

1985.10.26	Japan	1–2	South Korea	Tokyo, Japan
	Kimura 43'	JFA	? (?) ? (?)	Stadium: Tokyo National Stadium; Attendance: 62,000

1985.11.03	Japan	0–1	South Korea	Seoul, South Korea
		JFA	? (?)	Attendance: 70,000

=== Players statistics ===
Player	-1984	02.23	03.21	04.30	05.18	05.26	06.04	08.11	09.22	10.26	11.03	1985	Total
Hiromi Hara	46(18)	O(1)	O(1)	O	O(1)	O	O	O(1)	O(1)	O	O	10(5)	56(23)
Kazushi Kimura	38(17)	O(1)	O	O	O(1)	O(1)	O(1)	O(1)	O(1)	O(1)	O	10(7)	48(24)
Hisashi Kato	37(4)	O	O	O	O	-	-	O	O	O	O	8(0)	45(4)
Satoshi Tsunami	33(0)	O	O	O	O	-	-	O	-	O	O	7(0)	40(0)
Akihiro Nishimura	27(0)	O	O	O	O(2)	O	-	O	O	O	-	8(2)	35(2)
Takeshi Okada	21(1)	-	-	-	-	O	O	O	-	-	-	3(0)	24(1)
Koichi Hashiratani	18(1)	O(1)	O	O	O	O	O(1)	O	O	-	O	9(2)	27(3)
Takeshi Koshida	18(0)	-	-	-	-	-	-	-	-	-	O	1(0)	19(0)
Tetsuya Totsuka	16(3)	-	-	-	-	-	-	-	-	O	O	2(0)	18(3)
Shinji Tanaka	14(0)	-	-	-	O	O	O	-	-	-	-	3(0)	17(0)
Satoshi Tezuka	8(0)	-	-	-	-	-	-	O	O	-	-	2(0)	10(0)
Kazuaki Nagasawa	6(0)	-	-	-	O	O	O	-	-	-	-	3(0)	9(0)
Takashi Mizunuma	5(1)	-	O	O	O(1)	O	O(1)	O(1)	O	O	-	8(3)	13(4)
Yutaka Ikeuchi	4(0)	-	-	O	-	O	O	O	-	-	-	4(0)	8(0)
Yasutaro Matsuki	3(0)	O	O	-	O	-	-	O	O	O	-	6(0)	9(0)
Kiyotaka Matsui	2(0)	O	O	O	O	O	-	O	-	O	O	8(0)	10(0)
Yoshinori Ishigami	1(0)	O	O	O	O	-	O	-	O	O	O	8(0)	9(0)
Satoshi Miyauchi	1(0)	O	O	O	-	-	O	O	O	O	O	8(0)	9(0)
Atsushi Uchiyama	1(0)	O	-	-	-	-	-	-	-	-	-	1(0)	2(0)
Hiroshi Hirakawa	0(0)	-	O	O	-	O	O	-	-	O	O	6(0)	6(0)
Shinichi Morishita	0(0)	-	-	-	-	-	O	-	O	-	-	2(0)	2(0)
Toshinobu Katsuya	0(0)	-	-	-	-	-	-	-	O	-	O	2(0)	2(0)
George Yonashiro	0(0)	-	-	-	-	-	-	-	-	O	O	2(0)	2(0)
Masaru Uchiyama	0(0)	-	-	-	-	O	-	-	-	-	-	1(0)	1(0)
Shinobu Ikeda	0(0)	-	-	-	-	-	O	-	-	-	-	1(0)	1(0)

== Births ==
- 19 December: Tadanari Lee
