= Takekazu Suzuki =

Japanese footballer and manager

Takekazu Suzuki 鈴木 武一
Personal information
- Full name: Takekazu Suzuki
- Date of birth: April 8, 1956 (age 70)
- Place of birth: Shiogama, Miyagi, Japan
- Height: 1.70 m (5 ft 7 in)
- Position: Midfielder

Youth career
- 1972–1974: Sendai Daini High School

Senior career*
Years	Team	Apps	(Gls)
1975–1986	Yomiuri	62	(10)
1989–1995	Brummell Sendai		

Managerial career
- 1990–1995: Brummell Sendai
- 1998–1999: Vegalta Sendai
Medal record
Yomiuri
Winner	Japan Soccer League	1983
Winner	Japan Soccer League	1984
Runner-up	Japan Soccer League	1979
Runner-up	Japan Soccer League	1981
Winner	JSL Cup	1979
Winner	JSL Cup	1985
Winner	Emperor's Cup	1984
Runner-up	Emperor's Cup	1981
- * Club domestic league appearances and goals

Takekazu Suzuki (鈴木 武一, Suzuki Takekazu; born April 8, 1956) is a former Japanese football player and manager.

== Playing career ==
Suzuki was born in Shiogama on April 8, 1956. After graduating from high school, he joined Yomiuri in 1975 and he played until 1986. In 1989, he came back as player and coach at his local club Tohoku Electric Power (later Brummell Sendai). He retired in 1995.

== Coaching career ==
In 1989, Suzuki started coaching career as coach at his local club Tohoku Electric Power (later Brummell Sendai, Vegalta Sendai). In 1990, he became a manager and he managed until 1995. In 1998, he came back to Brummell Sendai. However the club lost 10 games in a row in 1999 and he resigned in July.

== Career statistics ==
Appearances and goals by club, season and competition
Club	Season	League			Emperor's Cup		J.League Cup		Total	
Club	Season	Division	Apps	Goals	Apps	Goals	Apps	Goals	Apps	Goals
Yomiuri	1976	JSL Division 2	9	2	1	0	3	2	13	4
Yomiuri	1977	JSL Division 2	17	2	2	2	4	1	23	5
Yomiuri	1978	JSL Division 1	13	5	2	1	3	0	18	6
Yomiuri	1979	JSL Division 1	2	0	2	1	2	1	6	2
Yomiuri	1980	JSL Division 1	2	0	1	1	1	0	4	1
Yomiuri	1981	JSL Division 1	4	0	2	0	0	0	6	0
Yomiuri	1982	JSL Division 1	10	1	2	0	1	0	13	1
Yomiuri	1983	JSL Division 1	1	0	0	0	1	0	2	0
Yomiuri	1984	JSL Division 1	0	0	0	0	1	0	1	0
Yomiuri	1985–86	JSL Division 1	4	0	2	1	0	0	6	1
Career total			62	10	14	6	16	4	92	20

== Managerial statistics ==
Team	From	To	Record				
Team	From	To	G	W	D	L	Win %
Vegalta Sendai	1999	1999	18	3	1	14	16.67
Total			18	3	1	14	16.67
