= Yukitaka Omi =

Japanese footballer and manager

Yukitaka Omi 小見 幸隆
Personal information
- Full name: Yukitaka Omi
- Date of birth: December 15, 1952 (age 73)
- Place of birth: Tokyo, Japan
- Position: Midfielder

Senior career*
Years	Team	Apps	(Gls)
1969–1986	Yomiuri		

International career
1978–1980	Japan	6	(0)

Managerial career
- 2001–2002: Tokyo Verdy
- 2005: Arte Takasaki
Medal record
Yomiuri
Winner	Japan Soccer League	1983
Winner	Japan Soccer League	1984
Runner-up	Japan Soccer League	1979
Runner-up	Japan Soccer League	1981
Winner	JSL Cup	1979
Winner	JSL Cup	1985
Winner	Emperor's Cup	1984
Runner-up	Emperor's Cup	1981
- * Club domestic league appearances and goals

Yukitaka Omi (小見 幸隆, Omi Yukitaka; born December 15, 1952) is a former Japanese football player and manager. He played for Japan national team.

== Club career ==
Omi was born in Tokyo on December 15, 1952. He joined new club Yomiuri in 1969. The club was promoted to new division Japan Soccer League Division 2 in 1972 and Division 1 in 1978. In 1979, the club won their first major title, 1979 JSL Cup. The club won the league champions in 1983 and 1984. The club also won 1984 Emperor's Cup and 1985 JSL Cup. He retired in 1986.

== National team career ==
On May 23, 1978, Omi debuted for Japan national team against Thailand. In 1980, he was selected Japan for 1980 Summer Olympics qualification. He played 6 games for Japan until 1980.

== Coaching career ==
After retirement, Omi started coaching career at Yomiuri (later Tokyo Verdy). In July 2001, he became a manager as Yasutaro Matsuki successor. However, he was sacked in April 2002. In April 2005, he signed with Arte Takasaki and managed the club in 1 season.

== Club statistics ==
Club performance			League		Cup		League Cup		Total	
Season	Club	League	Apps	Goals	Apps	Goals	Apps	Goals	Apps	Goals
Japan			League		Emperor's Cup		JSL Cup		Total	
1969	Yomiuri	Prefectural Leagues								
1970	Yomiuri	Prefectural Leagues								
1971	Yomiuri	Regional Leagues								
1972	Yomiuri	JSL Division 2	18	5			-		18	5
1973	Yomiuri	JSL Division 2	18	4			-		18	4
1974	Yomiuri	JSL Division 2	18	3			-		18	3
1975	Yomiuri	JSL Division 2	18	3			-		18	3
1976	Yomiuri	JSL Division 2	18	6	2	0	4	0	24	6
1977	Yomiuri	JSL Division 2	18	3	2	0	4	1	24	4
1978	Yomiuri	JSL Division 1	18	2	2	0	5	0	25	2
1979	Yomiuri	JSL Division 1	17	1	2	0	4	0	23	1
1980	Yomiuri	JSL Division 1	18	2	3	0	2	0	23	2
1981	Yomiuri	JSL Division 1	18	2	5	0	1	0	24	2
1982	Yomiuri	JSL Division 1	17	0	3	0	1	0	21	0
1983	Yomiuri	JSL Division 1	18	0	3	0	3	0	24	0
1984	Yomiuri	JSL Division 1	18	0	5	0	2	0	25	0
1985/86	Yomiuri	JSL Division 1	12	0	0	0	4	1	16	1
Total			244	31	23	0	30	2	297	33

== National team statistics ==
Japan national team
Year	Apps	Goals
1978	1	0
1979	0	0
1980	5	0
Total	6	0

== Managerial statistics ==
Team	From	To	Record				
Team	From	To	G	W	D	L	Win %
Tokyo Verdy	2001	2002	21	6	2	13	28.57
Total			21	6	2	13	28.57
