= Tetsuya Totsuka =

Japanese footballer and manager

Tetsuya Totsuka 戸塚 哲也
Personal information
- Full name: Tetsuya Totsuka
- Date of birth: April 24, 1961 (age 65)
- Place of birth: Tokyo, Japan
- Height: 1.74 m (5 ft 8 1/2 in)
- Positions: Forward; midfielder

Youth career
- 1977–1978: Yomiuri

Senior career*
| Years | Team | Apps | (Gls) |
| 1979–1995 | Verdy Kawasaki | 256 | (68) |
| 1994 | →Kashiwa Reysol (loan) | 17 | (4) |
| Total | | 273 | (72) |

International career
| 1980–1985 | Japan | 18 | (3) |

Managerial career
- 2006–2007: FC Gifu
- 2007: MIO Biwako Kusatsu
- 2008–2009: FC Machida Zelvia
- 2011: SC Sagamihara
Medal record
Verdy Kawasaki
| Winner | Japan Soccer League | 1983 |
| Winner | Japan Soccer League | 1984 |
| Winner | Japan Soccer League | 1986/87 |
| Winner | Japan Soccer League | 1990/91 |
| Winner | Japan Soccer League | 1991/92 |
| Runner-up | Japan Soccer League | 1979 |
| Runner-up | Japan Soccer League | 1981 |
| Runner-up | Japan Soccer League | 1989/90 |
| Winner | J1 League | 1993 |
| Winner | J1 League | 1994 |
| Runner-up | J1 League | 1995 |
| Winner | JSL Cup | 1979 |
| Winner | JSL Cup | 1985 |
| Winner | JSL Cup | 1991 |
| Winner | J.League Cup | 1992 |
| Winner | J.League Cup | 1993 |
| Winner | J.League Cup | 1994 |
| Winner | Emperor's Cup | 1984 |
| Winner | Emperor's Cup | 1986 |
| Winner | Emperor's Cup | 1987 |
| Runner-up | Emperor's Cup | 1981 |
| Runner-up | Emperor's Cup | 1991 |
| Runner-up | Emperor's Cup | 1992 |
- * Club domestic league appearances and goals

Tetsuya Totsuka (戸塚 哲也, Totsuka Tetsuya; born April 24, 1961) is a former Japanese football player and manager. He played for Japan national team.

== Club career ==
Totsuka was born in Tokyo on April 24, 1961. He joined Yomiuri (later Verdy Kawasaki) from youth team in 1979. The club won the champions in Japan Soccer League 5 times, JSL Cup 3 times and Emperor's Cup 3 times. This was golden era in club history. He also became a top scorer 2 times (1984 and 1990–91). On 23 November 1992, he assisted Kazuyoshi Miura's match winning goal in a 1–0 victory over Shimizu S-Pulse in the final of the J.League Cup final. In 1992, Japan Soccer League was folded and founded new league J1 League. However he lost opportunity to play after that. In 1994, he moved to Japan Football League club Kashiwa Reysol. He helped Reysol to promotion from the second-tier Japan Football League to the J1 League. He retired in 1995.

== International career ==
In December 1980, Totsuka was selected Japan national team for 1982 World Cup qualification. At this qualification, on December 22, he debuted against Singapore. He also played at 1982 Asian Games. In 1985, he was selected Japan for the first time in 3 years for 1986 World Cup qualification. This qualification was his last game for Japan. He played 18 games and scored 3 goals for Japan until 1985.

== Coaching career ==
In 2006, Totsuka signed with Japanese Regional Leagues club FC Gifu. He managed the club and promoted the club to Japan Football League. However, he was sacked in June 2007. In September 2007, he signed with Regional Leagues club FC Mi-O Biwako. He managed the club and promoted the club to Japan Football League. In 2008, he moved to Regional Leagues club FC Machida Zelvia. He managed the club and promoted the club to Japan Football League. He promoted each club to Japan Football League for 3 years in a row. End of 2009 season, he resigned a manager for FC Machida Zelvia. In 2011, he signed with Regional Leagues club SC Sagamihara. However, he was sacked in May.

== Career statistics ==
=== Club ===
| Club performance | | | League | | Cup | | League Cup | | Total | |
| Season | Club | League | Apps | Goals | Apps | Goals | Apps | Goals | Apps | Goals |
| Japan | | | League | | Emperor's Cup | | J.League Cup | | Total | |
|---|---|---|---|---|---|---|---|---|---|---|
| 1979 | Yomiuri | JSL Division 1 | 9 | 2 | 2 | 1 | 3 | 1 | 14 | 4 |
| 1980 | Yomiuri | JSL Division 1 | 17 | 2 | 1 | 1 | 2 | 0 | 20 | 3 |
| 1981 | Yomiuri | JSL Division 1 | 18 | 3 | 5 | 0 | 1 | 0 | 24 | 3 |
| 1982 | Yomiuri | JSL Division 1 | 18 | 6 | 3 | 2 | 1 | 0 | 22 | 8 |
| 1983 | Yomiuri | JSL Division 1 | 18 | 6 | 3 | 3 | 3 | 3 | 24 | 12 |
| 1984 | Yomiuri | JSL Division 1 | 16 | 14 | 5 | 5 | 2 | 2 | 23 | 21 |
| 1985/86 | Yomiuri | JSL Division 1 | 22 | 4 | 1 | 0 | 4 | 2 | 27 | 6 |
| 1986/87 | Yomiuri | JSL Division 1 | 20 | 3 | 4 | 3 | 1 | 0 | 25 | 6 |
| 1987/88 | Yomiuri | JSL Division 1 | 18 | 0 | 4 | 3 | 0 | 0 | 22 | 3 |
| 1988/89 | Yomiuri | JSL Division 1 | 22 | 5 | 2 | 0 | 3 | 0 | 27 | 5 |
| 1989/90 | Yomiuri | JSL Division 1 | 18 | 8 | 4 | 0 | 4 | 0 | 26 | 8 |
| 1990/91 | Yomiuri | JSL Division 1 | 22 | 10 | 2 | 2 | 2 | 0 | 26 | 12 |
| 1991/92 | Yomiuri | JSL Division 1 | 21 | 4 | 3 | 0 | 5 | 0 | 29 | 4 |
| 1992 | Verdy Kawasaki | J1 League | - | | 3 | 0 | 10 | 0 | 13 | 0 |
| 1993 | Verdy Kawasaki | J1 League | 10 | 1 | 1 | 0 | 6 | 1 | 17 | 2 |
| 1994 | Verdy Kawasaki | J1 League | 7 | 0 | 0 | 0 | 0 | 0 | 7 | 0 |
| 1994 | Kashiwa Reysol | Football League | 17 | 4 | 0 | 0 | 1 | 0 | 18 | 4 |
| 1995 | Verdy Kawasaki | J1 League | 0 | 0 | | | - | | 0 | 0 |
| Total | | | 273 | 72 | 40 | 20 | 48 | 9 | 361 | 101 |

=== International ===
Japan national team
| Year | Apps | Goals |
|---|---|---|
| 1980 | 4 | 0 |
| 1981 | 8 | 0 |
| 1982 | 4 | 3 |
| 1983 | 0 | 0 |
| 1984 | 0 | 0 |
| 1985 | 2 | 0 |
| Total | 18 | 3 |

=== National team goals ===
| # | Date | Venue | Opponent | Score | Result | Competition |
|---|---|---|---|---|---|---|
| 1. | 2 June 1982 | Hiroshima Stadium, Hiroshima, Japan | Singapore | 2–0 | Won | 1982 Kirin Cup |
| 2. | 18 July 1982 | Stadionul Național, Bucharest, Romania | Romania | 3–1 | Lost | Friendly |
| 3. | 23 November 1982 | Jawaharlal Nehru Stadium, New Delhi, India | South Yemen | 3–1 | Won | 1982 Asian Games |
Correct as of 6 November 2016

== Personal honors ==
- Japan Soccer League First Division Top Scorer - 1984, 1990/91
