= Ryoichi Kawakatsu =

Japanese footballer

Ryoichi Kawakatsu 川勝 良一
Personal information
- Full name: Ryoichi Kawakatsu
- Date of birth: April 5, 1958 (age 68)
- Place of birth: Kyoto, Kyoto, Japan
- Height: 1.79 m (5 ft 10 1/2 in)
- Position: Midfielder

Youth career
- 1974–1976: Kyoto Shogyo High School

College career
Years	Team	Apps	(Gls)
1977–1980	Hosei University		

Senior career*
Years	Team	Apps	(Gls)
1981–1982	Toshiba	35	(4)
1983–1989	Yomiuri	62	(3)
1989–1990	Kyoto Shiko	22	(0)
1990–1991	Tokyo Gas		
Total		119	(7)

International career
1981–1982	Japan	13	(0)

Managerial career
- 1997: Verdy Kawasaki
- 1998: Verdy Kawasaki
- 1999–2002: Vissel Kobe
- 2006: Avispa Fukuoka
- 2010–2012: Tokyo Verdy
- 2014: Kyoto Sanga FC
Medal record
Toshiba
Winner	JSL Cup	1981
Yomiuri
Winner	Japan Soccer League	1983
Winner	Japan Soccer League	1984
Winner	Japan Soccer League	1986/87
Winner	JSL Cup	1985
Winner	Emperor's Cup	1984
Winner	Emperor's Cup	1986
Winner	Emperor's Cup	1987
- * Club domestic league appearances and goals

Ryoichi Kawakatsu (川勝 良一, Kawakatsu Ryōichi; born April 5, 1958) is a former Japanese football player and manager. He played for Japan national team.

== Club career ==
Kawakatsu was born in Kyoto on April 5, 1958. After graduating from Hosei University, he joined Japan Soccer League Division 2 club Toshiba in 1981. In 1983, he moved to Yomiuri. The club won the league champions in 1983, 1984 and 1986–87. The club also won 1984, 1986, 1987 Emperor's Cup and 1985 JSL Cup. He moved to his local club Kyoto Shiko in 1989 and Tokyo Gas in 1990. He retired in 1991.

== National team career ==
On February 8, 1981, when Kawakatsu was a Hosei University student, he debuted for Japan national team against Malaysia. He played 13 games for Japan until 1982.

== Coaching career ==
After retirement, Kawakatsu started coaching career at Tokyo Gas in 1991. In 1992, he moved to Verdy Kawasaki (later Tokyo Verdy). In 1997, he managed at 1997 Emperor's Cup as Valdir Espinosa successor. In September 1998, he became a manager as Nicanor de Carvalho successor. In 1999, he moved to Vissel Kobe. He was sacked in July 2002. In June 2006, he signed with Avispa Fukuoka as Hiroshi Matsuda successor. However the club was relegated to J2 League and he resigned. In 2010, he returned to Tokyo Verdy and managed until September 2012. In June 2014, he signed with Kyoto Sanga FC and managed until end of season.

== Club statistics ==
Club performance			League		Cup		League Cup		Total	
Season	Club	League	Apps	Goals	Apps	Goals	Apps	Goals	Apps	Goals
Japan			League		Emperor's Cup		JSL Cup		Total	
1981	Toshiba	JSL Division 2	17	1	-		4	1	21	2
1982	Toshiba	JSL Division 2	18	3			2	0	20	3
1983	Yomiuri	JSL Division 1	12	1	3	0	2	0	17	1
1984	Yomiuri	JSL Division 1	14	2	5	1	2	0	21	3
1985/86	Yomiuri	JSL Division 1	16	0	0	0	3	0	19	0
1986/87	Yomiuri	JSL Division 1	4	0	0	0	0	0	4	0
1987/88	Yomiuri	JSL Division 1	15	0	2	0	1	0	18	0
1988/89	Yomiuri	JSL Division 1	1	0	0	0	0	0	1	0
1989/90	Kyoto Shiko	JSL Division 2	22	0			0	0	22	0
1990	Tokyo Gas	Regional Leagues								
1991/92	Tokyo Gas	JSL Division 2	15	0	-		1	0	16	0
Total			134	7	10	1	15	1	159	9

== National team statistics ==
Japan national team
Year	Apps	Goals
1981	10	0
1982	3	0
Total	13	0

== Managerial statistics ==
Team	From	To	Record				
Team	From	To	G	W	D	L	Win %
Verdy Kawasaki	September 1998	December 1998	14	3	0	11	21.43
Vissel Kobe	January 1999	July 2002	100	34	13	53	34.00
Avispa Fukuoka	June 2006	December 2006	22	4	7	11	18.18
Tokyo Verdy	January 2010	September 2012	106	50	20	36	47.17
Kyoto Sanga FC	29 June 2014	December 2014	22	6	12	4	27.27
Total			264	97	52	115	36.74
