= Ruy Ramos =

Japanese footballer

Ruy Ramos ラモス 瑠偉
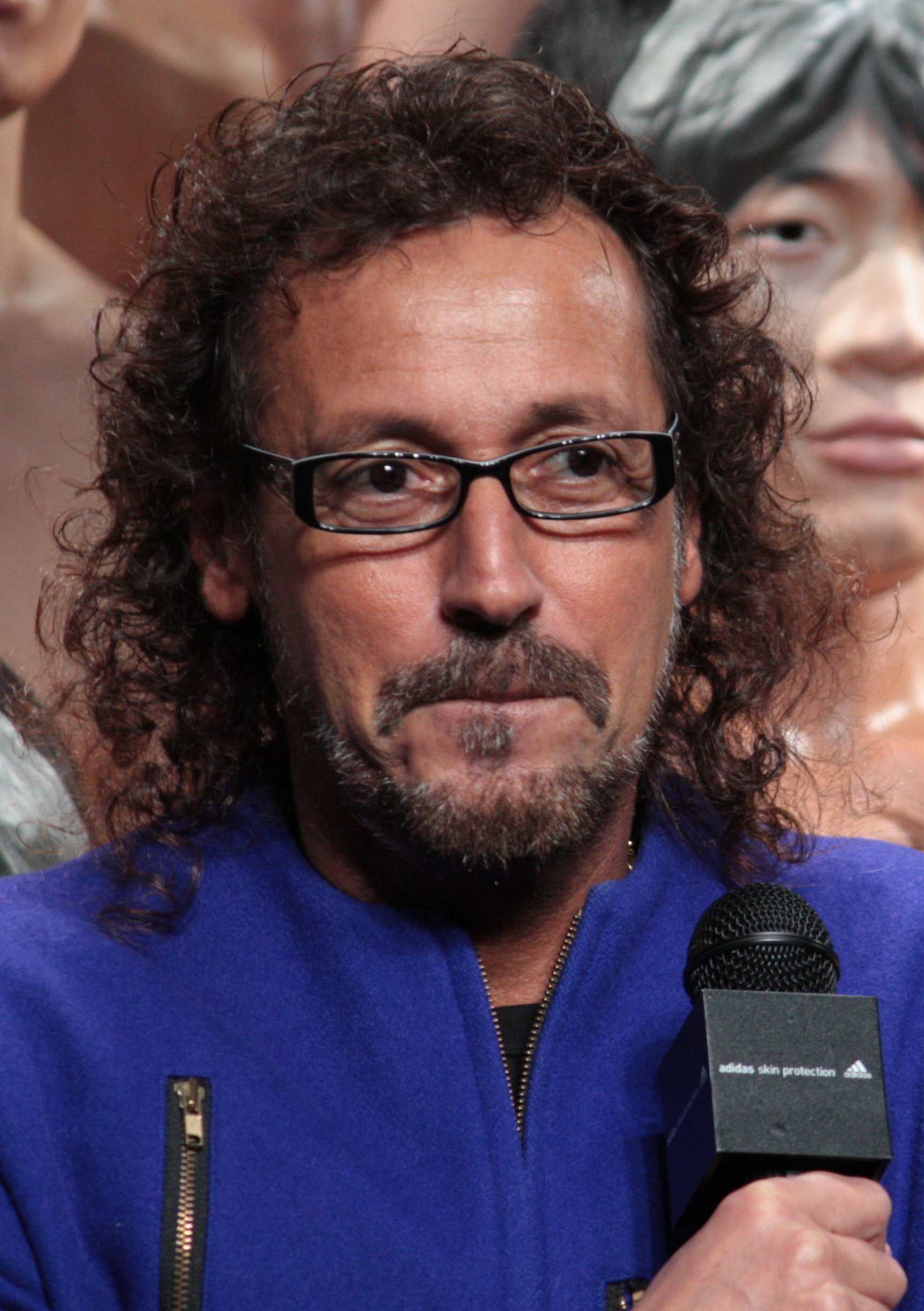
- Ramos in 2010

Personal information
- Birth name: Ruy Gonçalves Ramos Sobrinho
- Date of birth: 9 February 1957 (age 69)
- Place of birth: Mendes, Rio de Janeiro, Brazil
- Height: 1.81 m (5 ft 11 in)
- Position: Midfielder

Senior career*
| Years | Team | Apps | (Gls) |
| 1977–1996 | Yomiuri FC / Verdy Kawasaki | 302 | (83) |
| 1996–1997 | Kyoto Purple Sanga | 20 | (0) |
| 1997–1998 | Verdy Kawasaki | 39 | (0) |
| Total | | 361 | (83) |

International career
| 1990–1995 | Japan | 32 | (1) |

Managerial career
- 2005: Japan (beach)
- 2005: Kashiwa Reysol (assistant)
- 2006–2007: Tokyo Verdy
- 2009–2013: Japan (beach)
- 2014–2016: FC Gifu
- 2018–2019: Japan (beach)
Medal record
Verdy Kawasaki
| Winner | Japan Soccer League | 1983 |
| Winner | Japan Soccer League | 1984 |
| Winner | Japan Soccer League | 1986/87 |
| Winner | Japan Soccer League | 1990/91 |
| Winner | Japan Soccer League | 1991/92 |
| Runner-up | Japan Soccer League | 1979 |
| Runner-up | Japan Soccer League | 1981 |
| Runner-up | Japan Soccer League | 1989/90 |
| Winner | J1 League | 1993 |
| Winner | J1 League | 1994 |
| Runner-up | J1 League | 1995 |
| Winner | JSL Cup | 1979 |
| Winner | JSL Cup | 1985 |
| Winner | JSL Cup | 1991 |
| Winner | J.League Cup | 1992 |
| Winner | J.League Cup | 1993 |
| Winner | J.League Cup | 1994 |
| Runner-up | J.League Cup | 1996 |
| Winner | Emperor's Cup | 1984 |
| Winner | Emperor's Cup | 1986 |
| Winner | Emperor's Cup | 1987 |
| Winner | Emperor's Cup | 1996 |
| Runner-up | Emperor's Cup | 1981 |
| Runner-up | Emperor's Cup | 1991 |
| Runner-up | Emperor's Cup | 1992 |
Representing Japan
AFC Asian Cup
| Gold medal – first place | 1992 Japan |
- * Club domestic league appearances and goals

Ruy Ramos (Japanese: ラモス 瑠偉, Hepburn: Ramosu Rui; born Ruy Gonçalves Ramos Sobrinho (Portuguese: [ˈʁuj ɡõˈsawviz ˈʁɐ̃mus suˈbɾĩɲu]); 9 February 1957) is a former football manager and player. He is currently active as a television personality and tarento, represented by Irving. Born in Brazil, he played for the Japan national team.

== Club career ==
Ramos was one of the first foreign players in Japanese professional football, joining Japan Soccer League club Yomiuri (later Verdy Kawasaki) in 1977 at the age of 20. The club were Japan Soccer League champions five times, won the JSL Cup three times and the Emperor's Cup three times. The club also won the 1987 Asian Club Championship. In 1992, the Japan Soccer League was folded and was succeeded by the J1 League. The club were the league champions in 1993 and 1994. The club also won the 1992, 1993 and 1994 J.League Cup. In the summer of 1996, Ramos moved to Kyoto Purple Sanga. In the summer of 1997, he returned to Verdy Kawasaki and he retired at the end of the 1998 season, when he was 41 years old. Throughout his career, Ramos was selected as Japanese Footballer of the Year twice and named to the Best XI eight times. He was one of the central players in the golden era in Yomiuri/Verdy history. In 2018, Ramos was inducted into the Japan Football Hall of Fame.

== International career ==
In September 1990, when Ramos was 33 years old, he was called up to the Japan national team for the 1990 Asian Games. On 26 September, he made his debut against Bangladesh. Afterwards, he became a regular player for Japan. He was a member of the Japan team that won the 1992 Asian Cup and he played four matches in the competition. He was an important member of the national team during their unsuccessful 1994 FIFA World Cup qualification. Under manager Hans Ooft, Japan progressed to the final qualifying stage of the AFC for the 1994 FIFA World Cup. Ramos was on the pitch when Japan's hope to play in the finals was dashed by an injury-time Iraqi equaliser in the last qualifier, the match that the Japanese fans now refer to as the "Agony of Doha". In 1995, Ramos also played in the King Fahd Cup. From 1990 to 1995, he played 32 matches and scored one goal.

== Managerial career ==
Ramos briefly came out of his retirement for Okinawa Kariyushi FC as player–technical adviser in 2002. However, he left the club after a row with the management at the end of the season. He then served as technical adviser for crosstown FC Ryukyu. In March 2005, Ramos became coach of the Japan national beach soccer team and took them to the 2005 FIFA Beach Soccer World Cup, where they finished fourth.

In January 2006, he was named coach of his former club Tokyo Verdy, freshly relegated from J1 League. After a disappointing 2006 season in the J2 League, Ramos stated that if his team did not win the first game of the 2007 season, he would step down as head coach. The first game was on 4 March against Thespa Kusatsu, one of the weakest teams in the league, and Tokyo won this match 5–0. His team managed to finish second after all and Tokyo Verdy returned to the J1 League. Following the season, Ramos became the executive director of the club.

In 2009, Ramos became the coach of the national beach soccer team again. He led the team at the 2009, 2011 and 2013 and 2019 FIFA Beach Soccer World Cup.

In 2014, Ramos signed with J2 League club FC Gifu. However, the results of the club were bad every season and he was sacked in July 2016.

== Career statistics ==
=== Club ===
Appearances and goals by club, season and competition
| Club | Season | League | | | Emperor's Cup | | J.League Cup | | Total | |
| Club | Season | Division | Apps | Goals | Apps | Goals | Apps | Goals | Apps | Goals |
|---|---|---|---|---|---|---|---|---|---|---|
| Yomiuri | 1977 | JSL Division 2 | 4 | 5 | 2 | 1 | 0 | 0 | 6 | 6 |
| Yomiuri | 1978 | JSL Division 1 | 0 | 0 | 0 | 0 | 0 | 0 | 0 | 0 |
| Yomiuri | 1979 | JSL Division 1 | 15 | 14 | 0 | 0 | 4 | 4 | 19 | 18 |
| Yomiuri | 1980 | JSL Division 1 | 15 | 7 | 2 | 1 | 2 | 1 | 19 | 9 |
| Yomiuri | 1981 | JSL Division 1 | 9 | 1 | 0 | 0 | 1 | 0 | 10 | 1 |
| Yomiuri | 1982 | JSL Division 1 | 13 | 1 | 3 | 1 | 1 | 0 | 17 | 2 |
| Yomiuri | 1983 | JSL Division 1 | 14 | 10 | 3 | 1 | 0 | 0 | 17 | 11 |
| Yomiuri | 1984 | JSL Division 1 | 16 | 9 | 0 | 0 | 2 | 2 | 18 | 11 |
| Yomiuri | 1985–86 | JSL Division 1 | 18 | 7 | 2 | 1 | 4 | 0 | 24 | 8 |
| Yomiuri | 1986–87 | JSL Division 1 | 15 | 4 | 5 | 1 | 0 | 0 | 20 | 5 |
| Yomiuri | 1987–88 | JSL Division 1 | 17 | 4 | 5 | 1 | 0 | 0 | 22 | 5 |
| Yomiuri | 1988–89 | JSL Division 1 | 17 | 3 | 3 | 1 | 3 | 2 | 23 | 6 |
| Yomiuri | 1989–90 | JSL Division 1 | 22 | 5 | 3 | 0 | 3 | 3 | 28 | 8 |
| Yomiuri | 1990–91 | JSL Division 1 | 21 | 2 | 2 | 0 | 2 | 0 | 25 | 2 |
| Yomiuri | 1991–92 | JSL Division 1 | 18 | 2 | 5 | 0 | 5 | 0 | 28 | 2 |
| Verdy Kawasaki | 1992 | J1 League | – | | 4 | 1 | 8 | 1 | 12 | 2 |
| Verdy Kawasaki | 1993 | J1 League | 30 | 4 | 1 | 0 | 1 | 0 | 32 | 4 |
| Verdy Kawasaki | 1994 | J1 League | 26 | 3 | 0 | 0 | 3 | 0 | 29 | 3 |
| Verdy Kawasaki | 1995 | J1 League | 23 | 2 | 0 | 0 | – | | 23 | 2 |
| Verdy Kawasaki | 1996 | J1 League | 9 | 0 | 0 | 0 | 0 | 0 | 9 | 0 |
| Kyoto Purple Sanga | 1996 | J1 League | 10 | 0 | 2 | 2 | 9 | 0 | 21 | 2 |
| Kyoto Purple Sanga | 1997 | J1 League | 10 | 0 | 0 | 0 | 2 | 0 | 12 | 0 |
| Verdy Kawasaki | 1997 | J1 League | 10 | 0 | 2 | 0 | 0 | 0 | 12 | 0 |
| Verdy Kawasaki | 1998 | J1 League | 29 | 0 | 0 | 0 | 1 | 0 | 30 | 0 |
| Career total | | | 361 | 83 | 44 | 11 | 51 | 13 | 456 | 107 |

=== International ===
Appearances and goals by national team and year
| National team | Year | Apps | Goals |
|---|---|---|---|
| Japan | 1990 | 3 | 0 |
| Japan | 1991 | 2 | 0 |
| Japan | 1992 | 10 | 0 |
| Japan | 1993 | 14 | 1 |
| Japan | 1994 | 0 | 0 |
| Japan | 1995 | 3 | 0 |
| Total | | 32 | 1 |

== Managerial statistics ==
| Team | From | To | Record | | | | |
| Team | From | To | G | W | D | L | Win % |
|---|---|---|---|---|---|---|---|
| Tokyo Verdy | 2006 | 2007 | 96 | 47 | 19 | 30 | 48.96 |
| FC Gifu | 2014 | 2016 | 108 | 32 | 20 | 56 | 29.63 |
| Total | | | 204 | 79 | 39 | 86 | 38.73 |

== Honours ==
=== Club ===
- Asian Club Championship: 1987
- Japan Soccer League Division 1: 1983, 1984, 1986/87, 1990/91, 1991/92
- JSL Cup: 1979, 1985, 1991
- Konica Cup: 1990
- XEROX Champions Cup: 1992
- J1 League: 1993, 1994
- Emperor's Cup: 1984, 1986, 1987
- J.League Cup: 1992, 1993, 1994
- Japanese Super Cup: 1994, 1995

=== International ===
- AFC Asian Cup: 1992

=== Individual ===
- Japan Soccer League Division 1 top scorer: 1979, 1983
- Japanese Footballer of the Year: 1990, 1991
- J.League Best XI: 1993, 1994
- Japan Football Hall of Fame: Inducted in 2018

== Filmography ==
=== Film ===
| Year | Title | Role | Ref. |
|---|---|---|---|
| 1994 | Shoot | Himself | |
| 2007 | Bubble Fiction: Boom or Bust | Himself | |

=== Television ===
| Year | Title | Role | Ref. |
|---|---|---|---|
| 2002 | Sakura | Leonardo | |
| 2003 | Hamidashi Keiji Jōnetsu Kei Christmas Special | Priest | |
| 2023 | Geeks: Keisatsusho no Henjintachi | Himself | |
| 2025 | Omusubi | Himself | |

== See also ==
- Ramos Rui no World Wide Soccer – video game licensed/endorsed by Ruy Ramos
