= Shinji Kobayashi =

Japanese footballer and manager

Shinji Kobayashi 小林 伸二
Personal information
- Full name: Shinji Kobayashi
- Date of birth: August 24, 1960 (age 66)
- Place of birth: Unzen, Nagasaki, Japan
- Height: 1.74 m (5 ft 8 1/2 in)
- Position: Forward

Team information
- Current team: AC Nagano Parceiro (manager)

Youth career
- 1976–1978: Shimabara Shogyo High School

College career
Years	Team	Apps	(Gls)
1979–1982	Osaka University of Commerce		

Senior career*
Years	Team	Apps	(Gls)
1983–1992	Mazda		

Managerial career
- 2001–2003: Oita Trinita
- 2004–2006: Cerezo Osaka
- 2008–2011: Montedio Yamagata
- 2012–2015: Tokushima Vortis
- 2016–2017: Shimizu S-Pulse
- 2019–2021: Giravanz Kitakyushu
- 2023: Giravanz Kitakyushu
- 2024–2025: Tochigi SC
- 2026–: AC Nagano Parceiro
Medal record
Mazda
Runner-up	Emperor's Cup	1987
- * Club domestic league appearances and goals

Shinji Kobayashi (小林 伸二, Kobayashi Shinji; born August 24, 1960) is a Japanese football manager and a former player, who is the manager of J3 League club AC Nagano Parceiro.

== Playing career ==
Kobayashi was born in Unzen on August 24, 1960. After graduating from Osaka University of Commerce, he joined Mazda in 1983. He played until 1992.

== Coaching career ==
After retirement, Kobayashi started coaching career at Mazda (later Sanfrecce Hiroshima). He became a coach for top team and manager for youth team until 1999. He moved to Avispa Fukuoka in 2000, and Oita Trinita in 2001. In June 2001, at Oita Trinita, he was promoted to manager. In 2002, he led the club to won J2 League champions and the club was promoted to J1 League. He managed until 2003. In July 2004, he signed with Cerezo Osaka and managed until April 2006. After that, he managed J2 League club Montedio Yamagata (2008-2011), Tokushima Vortis (2012-2015) and Shimizu S-Pulse (2016-2017). He managed 4 J2 League clubs and he promoted all clubs to J1 League. In 2019, he signed with J3 League club Giravanz Kitakyushu.

== Club statistics ==
Club performance			League		Cup		League Cup		Total	
Season	Club	League	Apps	Goals	Apps	Goals	Apps	Goals	Apps	Goals
Japan			League		Emperor's Cup		League Cup		Total	
1983	Mazda	JSL Division 1								
1984	Mazda	JSL Division 2								
1985/86	Mazda	JSL Division 2								
1986/87	Mazda	JSL Division 1								
1987/88	Mazda	JSL Division 1								
1988/89	Mazda	JSL Division 2								
1989/90	Mazda	JSL Division 2								
1990/91	Mazda	JSL Division 2	11	1			2	0	13	1
1991/92	Mazda	JSL Division 1	0	0			0	0	0	0
Total	Japan		11	1	0	0	2	0	13	1
Career total			11	1	0	0	2	0	13	1

== Managerial statistics ==
As of 18 October 2026.

Team	From	To	Record				
Team	From	To	G	W	D	L	Win %
Oita Trinita	2001	2003	107	52	25	30	48.60
Cerezo Osaka	2004	2006	57	21	16	20	36.84
Montedio Yamagata	2008	2011	144	49	33	62	34.03
Tokushima Vortis	2012	2015	160	49	38	73	30.63
Shimizu S-Pulse	2016	2017	76	33	19	24	43.42
Giravanz Kitakyushu	2019	2021	118	45	31	42	38.14
Giravanz Kitakyushu	2023	2023	13	3	2	8	23.08
Tochigi SC	2024	2025	40	18	7	15	45.00
AC Nagano Parceiro	2026	Present	24	12	2	10	50.00
Total			739	282	173	284	38.16
