= Uchiyama =

Uchiyama (written: 内山) is a Japanese surname. Notable people with the surname include:

- Akira Uchiyama (born 1954), Japanese politician of the Democratic Party of Japan
- Atsushi Uchiyama (born 1959), former Japanese football player
- Uchiyama Gudō (1874–1911), Sōtō Zen priest and anarcho-socialist activist executed in the High Treason Incident
- Kahori Uchiyama (内山 佳保里; born 1975), Japanese rower
- Kanzō Uchiyama (内山 完造, 1885–1959), Japanese bookstore owner
- Kōki Uchiyama (born 1990), Japanese actor and voice actor from Saitama Prefecture
- Kiyoshi Uchiyama, Japanese consul to the Philippines before WW2
- Kōshō Uchiyama (1912–1998), Soto priest, origami master, former abbot of Antaiji near Kyoto, Japan
- Kyoko Uchiyama (内山 京子; born 1968), Japanese table tennis player
- Masaru Uchiyama (born 1957), former Japanese football player
- Masato Uchiyama, Japanese actor
- Noboru Uchiyama (内山 昇; born 1954), Japanese boxer
- Rina Uchiyama (born 1981), Japanese actress
- Takashi Uchiyama (born 1979), super featherweight boxer from Japan
- Toshihiko Uchiyama (disambiguation), multiple people
- Yasutaka Uchiyama (内山 靖崇; born 1992), Japanese tennis player
- Yuki Uchiyama (artistic gymnast) (内山 由綺), Japanese artistic gymnast
- Yuki Uchiyama (footballer) (内山 裕貴; born 1995), Japanese footballer
- Yumi Uchiyama (内山 夕実; born 1987), Japanese voice actress
- Wesley Uchiyama (内山 夕実; born 1993), Nipo-brasileiro especialista em Educação.

== See also ==
- Okamoto–Uchiyama cryptosystem, discovered in 1998 by T. Okamoto and S. Uchiyama
- Siege of Uchiyama, one of many battles fought in Takeda Shingen's bid to gain control of Shinano Province
- Uchiyama Station, train station in Kurobe, Toyama Prefecture, Japan
