= George Yonashiro =

Footballer (born 1950)

George Yonashiro 与那城 ジョージ
Personal information
- Date of birth: November 28, 1950 (age 75)
- Place of birth: São Paulo, Brazil
- Height: 1.70 m (5 ft 7 in)
- Position: Midfielder

Senior career*
Years	Team	Apps	(Gls)
1972–1986	Yomiuri	239	(92)
Total		239	(92)

International career
1985	Japan	2	(0)

Managerial career
- 1986–1990: Yomiuri
- 1994: Kyoto Purple Sanga
- 1996: Kyoto Purple Sanga
- 2004–2006: FC Ryukyu
- 2007–2010: Giravanz Kitakyushu
- 2013–2014: Blaublitz Akita
- 2017–2019: J.FC Miyazaki
Medal record
Yomiuri
Winner	Japan Soccer League	1983
Winner	Japan Soccer League	1984
Runner-up	Japan Soccer League	1979
Runner-up	Japan Soccer League	1981
Winner	JSL Cup	1979
Winner	JSL Cup	1985
Winner	Emperor's Cup	1984
Runner-up	Emperor's Cup	1981
- * Club domestic league appearances and goals

George Yonashiro (与那城 ジョージ, Yonashiro Jōji; born November 28, 1950) is a former football player and manager. Born in Brazil, he played for the Japan national team.

== Club career ==
Yonashiro was born in São Paulo, Brazil on November 28, 1950. He joined Japan Soccer League Division 2 club Yomiuri in 1972. The club was promoted to Division 1 in 1978. In 1979, the club won first title JSL Cup. The club won the league champions in 1983, 1984. The club also won 1984 Emperor's Cup and 1985 JSL Cup. He retired in 1986. He played 239 games and scored 93 goals in the league. He was selected Best Eleven 5 times.

== International career ==
In January 1985, Yonashiro was approved for naturalisation as a Japanese citizen by the Ministry of Justice. In October, when he was 34 years old, he was selected to the Japan national team for the 1986 World Cup qualification. At this competition, on October 26, he debuted against South Korea. He played two games for Japan in 1985.

== Coaching career ==
Yonashiro began his managerial career with Yomiuri in 1986, leading the club to the 1986–87 Japan Soccer League title, consecutive Emperor's Cup victories in 1986 and 1987, and the 1987 Asian Club Championship before resigning in 1990. He later managed Kyoto Purple Sanga twice, first in 1994 as successor to Seishiro Shimatani, and again in 1996 following Oscar. In 2004, Yonashiro took charge of FC Ryukyu, guiding the team from the Prefectural Leagues to the Regional Leagues in 2005 and the Japan Football League in 2006. He then joined Giravanz Kitakyushu in 2007, overseeing promotions to the Japan Football League in 2008 and the J2 League in 2010, before stepping down at the end of that season. His final managerial post came with Blaublitz Akita in 2013, where he achieved promotion to the newly established J3 League in 2014. He resigned later that year.

== Career statistics ==
=== Club ===
Appearances and goals by club, season and competition
Club	Season	League			Emperor's Cup		JSL Cup		Total	
Club	Season	Division	Apps	Goals	Apps	Goals	Apps	Goals	Apps	Goals
Yomiuri	1972	JSL Division 2	9	5	–		–		9	5
Yomiuri	1973	JSL Division 2	18	15	–		–		18	15
Yomiuri	1974	JSL Division 2	18	13			–		18	13
Yomiuri	1975	JSL Division 2	18	6	–		–		18	6
Yomiuri	1976	JSL Division 2	16	7	2	1	4	0	22	8
Yomiuri	1977	JSL Division 2	17	7	3	1	2	1	22	9
Yomiuri	1978	JSL Division 1	18	5	2	1	6	2	26	8
Yomiuri	1979	JSL Division 1	18	7	2	2	4	0	24	9
Yomiuri	1980	JSL Division 1	18	4	3	0	2	0	23	4
Yomiuri	1981	JSL Division 1	15	10	5	2	1	0	21	12
Yomiuri	1982	JSL Division 1	18	5	3	0	1	0	22	5
Yomiuri	1983	JSL Division 1	18	2	3	1	3	1	24	4
Yomiuri	1984	JSL Division 1	17	5	4	2	2	1	23	8
Yomiuri	1985–86	JSL Division 1	21	1	2	1	4	2	27	3
Career total			239	92	29	11	29	6	297	109

=== International ===
Appearances and goals by national team and year
National team	Year	Apps	Goals
Japan national team	1985	2	0
Total		2	0

== Managerial statistics ==
Team	From	To	Record				
Team	From	To	G	W	D	L	Win %
Yomiuri	1986	1990	88	40	30	18	45.45
Kyoto Purple Sanga	1996	1996	15	8	0	7	53.33
FC Ryukyu	2004	2006	56	23	12	21	41.07
Giravanz Kitakyushu	2007	2010	124	48	32	44	38.71
Blaublitz Akita	2013	2014	67	24	12	31	35.82
J.FC Miyazaki	2017	2019	56	48	0	8	85.71
Total			406	191	86	129	47.04
