= Yasutaro Matsuki =

Japanese footballer and manager

Yasutaro Matsuki 松木 安太郎
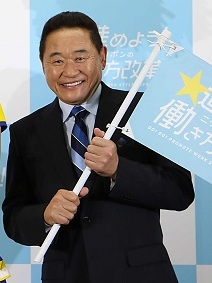

Personal information
- Full name: Yasutaro Matsuki
- Date of birth: November 28, 1957 (age 68)
- Place of birth: Chuo, Tokyo, Japan
- Height: 1.68 m (5 ft 6 in)
- Position: Defender

Youth career
- 1968–1972: Yomiuri

Senior career*
Years	Team	Apps	(Gls)
1973–1990	Yomiuri	269	(9)
Total		269	(9)

International career
1984–1986	Japan	11	(0)

Managerial career
- 1993–1994: Verdy Kawasaki
- 1998: Cerezo Osaka
- 2001: Tokyo Verdy
Medal record
Yomiuri
Winner	Japan Soccer League	1983
Winner	Japan Soccer League	1984
Winner	Japan Soccer League	1986/87
Runner-up	Japan Soccer League	1979
Runner-up	Japan Soccer League	1981
Runner-up	Japan Soccer League	1989/90
Winner	JSL Cup	1979
Winner	JSL Cup	1985
Winner	Emperor's Cup	1984
Winner	Emperor's Cup	1986
Winner	Emperor's Cup	1987
Runner-up	Emperor's Cup	1981
- * Club domestic league appearances and goals

Yasutaro Matsuki (松木 安太郎, Matsuki Yasutarō; born November 28, 1957) is a former Japanese football player and manager. He played for Japan national team. He also worked as a football commentator.

== Club career ==
Matsuki was born in Chuo, Tokyo on November 28, 1957. He joined Japan Soccer League Division 2 club Yomiuri from youth team in 1973. The club was promoted to Division 1 in 1978. The club won the champions in Japan Soccer League 3 times, JSL Cup 2 times and Emperor's Cup 3 times. From 1983, he also served as captain. This was golden era in club history. He retired in 1990. He played 269 games and scored 9 goals in the league. He was selected Best Eleven 3 times.

== National team career ==
In April 1984, Matsuki was selected Japan national team for 1984 Summer Olympics qualification. At this qualification, on April 15, he debuted against Thailand. He also played at 1986 World Cup qualification and 1986 Asian Games. He played 11 games for Japan until 1986.

== Coaching career ==
After retirement, Matsuki started coaching career at Yomiuri (later Verdy Kawasaki, Tokyo Verdy) in 1990. In 1993, he became a manager. The club won the champions at J1 League and J.League Cup and he was selected Best Manager awards for 2 years in a row (1993-1994). He resigned end of 1994 season. In 1998, he signed with Cerezo Osaka and managed in 1 season. In 2001, he returned to Tokyo Verdy in the first year after relocating to Tokyo. However he was sacked in July.

== Video games ==
Matsuki appeared on the cover of the Japanese version of World Cup Striker, a soccer game released in 1994 for the Super NES. In the PlayStation title J-League Jikkyō Winning Eleven 97, Matsuki comments the matches alongside Jon Kabira.

== Club statistics ==
Club performance			League		Cup		League Cup		Total	
Season	Club	League	Apps	Goals	Apps	Goals	Apps	Goals	Apps	Goals
Japan			League		Emperor's Cup		JSL Cup		Total	
1973	Yomiuri	JSL Division 2	0	0			-		0	0
1974	Yomiuri	JSL Division 2	8	0			-		8	0
1975	Yomiuri	JSL Division 2	18	0			-		18	0
1976	Yomiuri	JSL Division 2	17	2	2	0	4	0	23	2
1977	Yomiuri	JSL Division 2	18	0	3	0	4	0	25	0
1978	Yomiuri	JSL Division 1	18	0	2	0	6	0	26	0
1979	Yomiuri	JSL Division 1	18	0	2	0	4	0	24	0
1980	Yomiuri	JSL Division 1	17	1	3	1	2	0	22	2
1981	Yomiuri	JSL Division 1	18	1	5	0	1	0	24	1
1982	Yomiuri	JSL Division 1	17	0	3	0	1	0	21	0
1983	Yomiuri	JSL Division 1	18	2	3	0	3	0	24	2
1984	Yomiuri	JSL Division 1	18	2	5	0	0	0	23	2
1985/86	Yomiuri	JSL Division 1	22	1	2	0	4	1	28	2
1986/87	Yomiuri	JSL Division 1	22	0	5	1	1	0	28	1
1987/88	Yomiuri	JSL Division 1	19	0	4	1	1	0	24	1
1988/89	Yomiuri	JSL Division 1	21	0	3	0	2	0	26	0
1989/90	Yomiuri	JSL Division 1	0	0	1	0	3	0	4	0
Total			269	9	43	3	36	1	348	13

== National team statistics ==
Japan national team
Year	Apps	Goals
1984	3	0
1985	6	0
1986	2	0
Total	11	0

== Managerial statistics ==
Team	From	To	Record				
Team	From	To	G	W	D	L	Win %
Verdy Kawasaki	1993	1994	80	59	0	21	73.75
Cerezo Osaka	1998	1998	34	15	0	19	44.12
Tokyo Verdy	2001	2001	14	4	0	10	28.57
Total			128	78	0	50	60.94

== Honours ==
=== Player ===
Yomiuri

- Japan Soccer League Division 1: 1983, 1984, 1986–87
- Emperor's Cup: 1984, 1986, 1987
- JSL Cup: 1979, 1985
- Asian Club Championship: 1987

=== Manager ===
Tokyo Verdy

- J.League Division 1: 1993, 1994
- J.League Cup: 1993, 1994

Individual

- J.League Manager of the Year: 1993, 1994
