= 1985 JSL Cup final =

Yomiuri	Nissan Motors
2	0
- Date: July 7, 1985
- Venue: Toyohashi Football Stadium, Aichi

1985 JSL Cup final was the tenth final of the JSL Cup competition. The final was played at Toyohashi Football Stadium in Aichi on July 7, 1985. Yomiuri won the championship.

== Overview ==
Yomiuri won their 2nd title, by defeating Nissan Motors 2–0.

== Match details ==
July 7, 1985

Yomiuri	2-0	Nissan Motors
? (?) ? (?)

Toyohashi Football Stadium

== See also ==
- 1985 JSL Cup
