= 1992 J.League Cup final =

| Verdy Kawasaki | Shimizu S-Pulse |
| 1 | 0 |
- Date: November 23, 1992
- Venue: National Stadium, Tokyo

1992 J.League Cup final was the 1st final of the J.League Cup competition. The final was played at National Stadium in Tokyo on November 23, 1992. Verdy Kawasaki won the championship.

== Match details ==
November 23, 1992

| Verdy Kawasaki | 1–0 | Shimizu S-Pulse |
|---|---|---|
| Kazuyoshi Miura 57' | Report |

National Stadium

Verdy Kawasaki
| GK | 1 | (Japan) Shinkichi Kikuchi |
| DF | 2 | (Japan) Hisashi Kato |
| DF | 3 | (Brazil) Pereira |
| DF | 4 | (Brazil) Davi | (substituted off) 39' |
| DF | 6 | (Japan) Satoshi Tsunami |
| MF | 5 | (Japan) Tetsuji Hashiratani |
| MF | 7 | (Japan) Tetsuya Totsuka | (substituted off) 78' |
| MF | 8 | (Japan) Tsuyoshi Kitazawa |
| MF | 10 | (Japan) Ruy Ramos |
| FW | 9 | (Japan) Nobuhiro Takeda |
| FW | 11 | (Japan) Kazuyoshi Miura |
Substitutes:
| GK | 16 | (Japan) Takayuki Fujikawa |
| DF | 12 | (Japan) Ko Ishikawa | (substituted on) 39' |
| MF | 14 | (Japan) Shiro Kikuhara | (substituted on) 78' |
| FW | 13 | (Brazil) Ferreyra |
| FW | 15 | (Japan) Yoshinori Abe |
Manager:
(Brazil) Pepe

Shimizu S-Pulse
| GK | 1 | (Japan) Masanori Sanada |
| DF | 2 | (Brazil) Marco Antonio |
| DF | 3 | (Japan) Hiroaki Hiraoka | (substituted off) 78' |
| DF | 4 | (Japan) Naoki Naito |
| DF | 7 | (Japan) Takumi Horiike |
| MF | 5 | (Japan) Yasutoshi Miura |
| MF | 6 | (Japan) Masaaki Sawanobori |
| MF | 8 | (Brazil) Toninho |
| FW | 9 | (Brazil) Mirandinha |
| FW | 10 | (Japan) Kenta Hasegawa |
| FW | 11 | (Japan) Tatsuru Mukojima |
Substitutes:
| GK | 16 | (Japan) Katsumi Otaki |
| DF | 12 | (Japan) Yasuhiro Yamada |
| MF | 13 | (Japan) Noriaki Asakura |
| FW | 14 | (Japan) Fumiaki Aoshima | (substituted on) 78' |
| FW | 15 | (Japan) Jun Iwashita |
Manager:
(Brazil) Leao

== See also ==
- 1992 J.League Cup
