= 1979 JSL Cup final =

Yomiuri	Furukawa Electric
3	2
- Date: July 29, 1979
- Venue: Osaka Nagai Stadium, Osaka

1979 JSL Cup final was the fourth final of the JSL Cup competition. The final was played at Osaka Nagai Stadium in Osaka on July 29, 1979. Yomiuri won the championship.

== Overview ==
Yomiuri won their 1st title, by defeating Furukawa Electric 3–2.

== Match details ==
July 29, 1979

Yomiuri	3-2	Furukawa Electric
? (?) ? (?) ? (?)		? (?) ? (?)

Osaka Nagai Stadium

== See also ==
- 1979 JSL Cup
