= 2005 Japanese Super Cup =

Yokohama F. Marinos	Tokyo Verdy
2	2
- Date: February 26, 2005
- Venue: International Stadium Yokohama, Kanagawa
- Attendance: 21,104

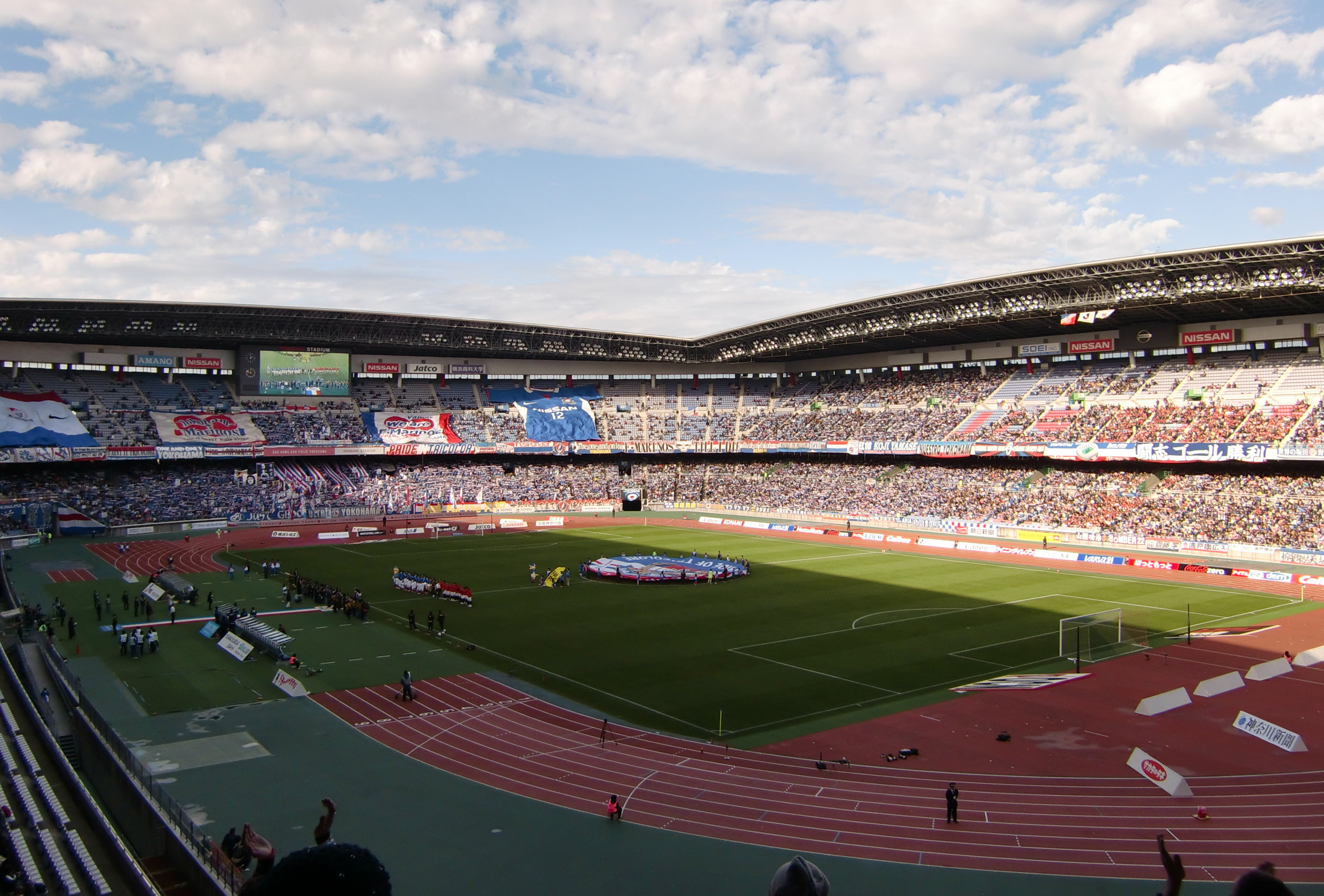
Location of the match at Nissan Stadium.

2005 Japanese Super Cup was the Japanese Super Cup competition. The match was played at International Stadium Yokohama in Kanagawa on February 26, 2005.

This was the clubs' first Super Cup encounter since their clash in 1984 under their former corporate identities. Tokyo Verdy won the encounter again.

== Match details ==
February 26, 2005

Yokohama F. Marinos	2–2	Tokyo Verdy
Penalties
	4–5

International Stadium Yokohama
Attendance: 21,104
