= Masaru Uchiyama =

Japanese footballer (born 1957)

Masaru Uchiyama 内山 勝
Personal information
- Full name: Masaru Uchiyama
- Date of birth: April 14, 1957 (age 69)
- Place of birth: Shizuoka, Japan
- Height: 1.63 m (5 ft 4 in)
- Position: Defender

Youth career
- 1973–1975: Shimizu Higashi High School

College career
Years	Team	Apps	(Gls)
1976–1979	University of Tsukuba		

Senior career*
Years	Team	Apps	(Gls)
1980–1989	Yamaha Motors	122	(4)
Total		122	(4)

International career
1985	Japan	1	(0)
Medal record
Yamaha Motors
Winner	Japan Soccer League	1987/88
Winner	Emperor's Cup	1982
- * Club domestic league appearances and goals

Masaru Uchiyama (内山 勝, Uchiyama Masaru; born April 14, 1957) is a former Japanese football player. He played for Japan national team. His brother Atsushi Uchiyama also played for Japan national team.

== Club career ==
Uchiyama was born in Shizuoka Prefecture on April 14, 1957. After graduating from University of Tsukuba, he joined Yamaha Motors in 1980. The club won 1982 Emperor's Cup and 1987–88 Japan Soccer League. He retired in 1989. He played 122 games and scored 4 goals in the league.

== National team career ==
On May 26, 1985, Uchiyama debuted for Japan national team against Uruguay.

== Club statistics ==
Club performance			League	
Season	Club	League	Apps	Goals
Japan			League	
1980	Yamaha Motors	JSL Division 1	9	1
1981	Yamaha Motors	JSL Division 1	16	0
1982	Yamaha Motors	JSL Division 2	18	0
1983	Yamaha Motors	JSL Division 1	6	1
1984	Yamaha Motors	JSL Division 1	18	2
1985/86	Yamaha Motors	JSL Division 1	21	0
1986/87	Yamaha Motors	JSL Division 1	22	0
1987/88	Yamaha Motors	JSL Division 1	12	0
1988/89	Yamaha Motors	JSL Division 1	0	0
Total			122	4

== National team statistics ==
Japan national team
Year	Apps	Goals
1985	1	0
Total	1	0
