= Atsushi Uchiyama =

Japanese footballer

Atsushi Uchiyama 内山 篤
Personal information
- Full name: Atsushi Uchiyama
- Date of birth: June 29, 1959 (age 67)
- Place of birth: Shizuoka, Shizuoka, Japan
- Height: 1.67 m (5 ft 5 1/2 in)
- Position: Midfielder

Youth career
- 1975–1977: Shimizu Higashi High School
- 1978–1981: Kokushikan University

Senior career*
Years	Team	Apps	(Gls)
1982–1992	Yamaha Motors	195	(18)
Total		195	(18)

International career
1984–1985	Japan	2	(0)

Managerial career
- 2007–2008: Júbilo Iwata
- 2015–2017: Japan U-20
Medal record
Men's football
Representing Japan (as manager)
AFC U-19 Championship
Winner	2016 Bahrain
- * Club domestic league appearances and goals

Atsushi Uchiyama (内山 篤, Uchiyama Atsushi; born June 29, 1959) is a former Japanese football player and manager. He played for Japan national team. His brother Masaru Uchiyama also played for Japan national team.

== Club career ==
Uchiyama was born in Shizuoka on June 29, 1959. After graduating from Kokushikan University, he joined Japan Soccer League Division 2 club Yamaha Motors in 1982. In 1982, the club won the champions and was promoted to Division 1. The club also won Emperor's Cup. The club won the league champions in 1987–88. He retired in 1992. He played 195 games and scored 18 goals in the league.

== National team career ==
On September 30, 1984, Uchiyama debuted for Japan national team against South Korea. In 1995, he also played at 1986 World Cup qualification. He played 2 games for Japan until 1986.

== Coaching career ==
After retirement, Uchiyama started coaching career at Yamaha Motors (later Júbilo Iwata) in 1992. He mainly served as a coach for top team and a manager for youth team. In September 2007, he became a manager for top team as Adílson Batista successor. However he was sacked in August 2008. In 2015, he became a manager for Japan U-20 national team. At 2016 AFC U-19 Championship, U-20 Japan won the champions first time and won to qualify for 2017 U-20 World Cup for the first time in 10 years. He resigned after 2017 U-20 World Cup.

== Club statistics ==
Club performance			League		Cup		League Cup		Total	
Season	Club	League	Apps	Goals	Apps	Goals	Apps	Goals	Apps	Goals
Japan			League		Emperor's Cup		JSL Cup		Total	
1982	Yamaha Motors	JSL Division 2	17	3					17	3
1983	Yamaha Motors	JSL Division 1	18	2					18	2
1984	Yamaha Motors	JSL Division 1	18	2					18	2
1985/86	Yamaha Motors	JSL Division 1	21	2					21	2
1986/87	Yamaha Motors	JSL Division 1	22	3					22	3
1987/88	Yamaha Motors	JSL Division 1	22	2					22	2
1988/89	Yamaha Motors	JSL Division 1	21	2					21	2
1989/90	Yamaha Motors	JSL Division 1	19	1			5	0	24	1
1990/91	Yamaha Motors	JSL Division 1	21	1			0	0	21	1
1991/92	Yamaha Motors	JSL Division 1	16	0			1	0	17	0
Total			195	18	0	0	6	0	201	18

== National team statistics ==
Japan national team
Year	Apps	Goals
1984	1	0
1985	1	0
Total	2	0

== Managerial statistics ==
Team	From	To	Record				
Team	From	To	G	W	D	L	Win %
Júbilo Iwata	2007	2008	33	11	8	14	33.33
Total			33	11	8	14	33.33
