= 1984 Japanese Super Cup =

Yomiuri	Nissan Motors
2	0
- Date: March 25, 1984
- Venue: National Stadium, Tokyo

1984 Japanese Super Cup was the Japanese Super Cup competition. The match was played at National Stadium in Tokyo on March 25, 1984. Yomiuri won the championship.

This was the last Super Cup contested as the Japan Soccer League switched to a fall-spring season, which ultimately culminated in the creation of the J.League as a professional league. A Super Cup was not contested until 1994, after the first J.League season was completed and a spring-fall Japanese champion was again declared.

== Match details ==
March 25, 1984

Yomiuri	2–0	Nissan Motors

National Stadium
