= Toshihiko Uchiyama =

Toshihiko Uchiyama may refer to:

- Toshihiko Uchiyama (footballer, born 1978) (内山 俊彦), Japanese footballer
- Toshihiko Uchiyama (footballer, born 1989) (内山 俊彦), Japanese footballer
