= 1995 Japanese Super Cup =

| Verdy Kawasaki | Bellmare Hiratsuka |
| 2 | 2 |
- Date: March 11, 1995
- Venue: National Stadium, Tokyo
- Attendance: 53,167

1995 Japanese Super Cup was the Japanese Super Cup competition. The match was played at National Stadium in Tokyo on March 11, 1995. Verdy Kawasaki won the championship.

== Match details ==
March 11, 1995

| Verdy Kawasaki | 2–2 | Bellmare Hiratsuka |
Penalties
| | 4–2 |

National Stadium
Attendance: 53,167
