= 1994 Japanese Super Cup =

Verdy Kawasaki	Yokohama Flügels
2	1
- Date: March 5, 1994
- Venue: National Stadium, Tokyo
- Attendance: 51,154

1994 Japanese Super Cup was the Japanese Super Cup competition. The match was played at National Stadium in Tokyo on March 5, 1994. Verdy Kawasaki won the championship.

== Match details ==
March 5, 1994

Verdy Kawasaki	2–1	Yokohama Flügels

National Stadium
Attendance: 51,154
