= Kyoto Prefectural Police SC =

Japanese football club

Kyoto Prefectural Police S.C.
- Full name: Kyoto Prefectural Police; Soccer Club
- Ground: Kyoto, Japan
- League: Prefectural Leagues

Kyoto Prefectural Police Soccer Club is a Japanese football club based in Kyoto. The club has played in Japan Soccer League Division 2. Currently plays in Japanese Prefectural Leagues.
