= 1987 Emperor's Cup =

Japanese football tournament

Tournament details
- Country: Japan

Final positions
- Champions: Yomiuri FC (3rd title)
- Runners-up: Mazda
- Semifinalists: Furukawa Electric; Sumitomo Metals

The 1987 Emperor's Cup was the 67th edition of the annually known contested cup. It was contested by 32 teams, and Yomiuri won the championship.

== Results ==
=== 1st round ===
- Yomiuri 5–0 Doshisha University
- NTT Shikoku 0–2 Seino Transportation
- Honda 2–0 Fujitsu
- Niigata Eleven 0–9 Fujita Industries
- Nissan Motors 3–1 Cosmo Oil
- Hitachi 1–0 Yamaha Motors
- TDK 1–10 Tokai University
- Hakodate Mazda 1–7 Furukawa Electric
- Mitsubishi Motors 1–0 NTT Kanto
- Sapporo University 0–3Toshiba
- Sumitomo Metals 5–0 Kyoto Sangyo University
- Osaka University of Commerce 1–1 (PK 4–5) Yanmar Diesel
- Mazda 3–0 JATCO
- Kawasaki Steel Mizushima 1–5 Toyota Motors
- Yawata Steel 0–2 Matsushita Electric
- Fukuoka University 0–2 Nippon Kokan

=== 2nd round ===
- Yomiuri 3–0 Seino Transportation
- Honda 0–0 (PK 8–7) Fujita Industries
- Nissan Motors 4–0 Hitachi
- Tokai University 0–5 Furukawa Electric
- Mitsubishi Motors 0–1 Toshiba
- Sumitomo Metals 3–1 Yanmar Diesel
- Mazda 3–1 Toyota Motors
- Matsushita Electric 0–0 (PK 4–2) Nippon Kokan

=== Quarterfinals ===
- Yomiuri 1–1 (PK 4–2) Honda
- Nissan Motors 1–1 (PK 2–3) Furukawa Electric
- Toshiba 1–1 (PK 3–5) Sumitomo Metals
- Mazda 0–0 (PK 4–2) Matsushita Electric

=== Semifinals ===
- Yomiuri 0–0 (PK 4–2) Furukawa Electric
- Sumitomo Metals 1–2 Mazda

=== Final ===
- Yomiuri 2–0 Mazda

Yomiuri won the championship Excluded from the Asian Cup Winners' Cup 1988.
