= Tokyo Verdy =

Japanese professional football club

Tokyo Verdy 東京ヴェルディ
- Full name: Tokyo Verdy Football Club
- Nickname: Verdy
- Founded: 1 October 1969; 57 years ago as Yomiuri FC
- Ground: Ajinomoto Stadium; Chōfu, Tokyo
- Capacity: 49,970
- Owner: Tokyo Verdy Holdings
- Chairman: Yasuo Shimada
- Manager: Naoki Sōma
- League: J1 League
- 2026: J1 League, 10th of 20
- Website: www.verdy.co.jp
Home colours	Away colours

Tokyo Verdy (東京ヴェルディ, Tōkyō Berudi) is a Japanese professional football club based in Tokyo. The club competes in the J1 League, the top tier of Japanese football, and were the inaugural champions of the J1 League in 1993.

Tokyo Verdy are one of the most successful clubs in the country winning 2 J1 League, 5 Emperor's Cup, 3 J.League Cup and 4 Japanese Super Cup. Continentally, the club also won the Asian Club Championship in the 1987 edition.

== History ==
Founded as Yomiuri Football Club in 1969, Tokyo Verdy is one of the most decorated clubs in the J.League, with honours including 2 league titles, 5 Emperor's Cups, 6 JSL Cup/J.League Cups and an Asian Club Championship title, and the most successful team in Japanese football history with 25 titles. The club was an original member (Note: The Original Ten of the J.League in 1992 were Kashima Antlers, Urawa Red Diamonds, JEF United Ichihara, Verdy Kawasaki, Yokohama Marinos, Yokohama Flügels, Shimizu S-Pulse, Nagoya Grampus Eight, Gamba Osaka and Sanfrecce Hiroshima.) of the J.League in 1993.

=== Early years and rise to the top (1969–1983) ===
In October 1968, following Japan's bronze medal triumph at the 1968 Summer Olympics in Mexico City and the interest in football that ensued, Japan Football Association president Yuzuru Nozu visited Yomiuri Giants chairman Matsutaro Shoriki to ask him if Yomiuri was willing to ride on the wave of the game by establishing their own football club. Shoriki died a year later, in 1969, but not before signing his name to the plans to establish Yomiuri Football Club. Backed by the Yomiuri Group and NTV, Yomiuri Football Club firstly launched at Tokyo Local League B (5th tier) in 1969. They began gaining promotions from the Tokyo Local League to the Kanto Football League (3rd tier) in 1971. In 1971, Yomiuri marked 3rd place and promoted Japan Soccer League Second Division.

They were promoted to First Division in 1978, starting a long career of success in the top flight. Their first major title was the Japan Soccer League Cup in 1979.

=== Golden era (1983–1994) ===
From its days as Yomiuri, the ownership had visions of a football equivalent of the baseball team Yomiuri Giants, a star-studded powerhouse with fans across Japan. As Japanese football began its transition from the JSL to the J.League in the early 1990s, it invested heavily in stars and featured Japan internationals Kazuyoshi Miura, Ruy Ramos and Tsuyoshi Kitazawa.

The last two JSL championships as Yomiuri in 1990–91 and 1991–92, and then winning the first two championships as Verdy Kawasaki in 1993 and 1994, effectively winning four straight Japanese league titles making a total of seven overall; the highest in the Japanese system. Verdy also won the 1996 Emperor's Cup and three consecutive J.League Cups from 1992 to 1994.

==== J.League dominance ====
The JSL disbanded and reformed as the professional J.League in 1993. At this time the team professionalized and renamed itself Verdy Kawasaki, "Coined from the Portuguese "VERDE" meaning "green" probably named after their green jersey colour "Tokyo Greens/Tokyo Verdi", although the color was picked in homage to Brazilian club Palmeiras, a team admired by one of Yomiuri's first idols, São Paulo-born George Yonashiro. Although Yomiuri was dropped from the name as the club spun off from the company, the team remained under Yomiuri's ownership until 1997, when it was acquired by Nippon Television Network, the broadcast arm of the Yomiuri Group.

=== Lack of success and support (1995–2000) ===
This early success did not last, however, and as the stars aged, the team's performance suffered. Verdy's 1st-place finish in the 2nd stage of the 1995 season would be its last stage victory and the 1996 Emperor's Cup would be its last major title of the decade. A downturn in the national economy and the cooling of the J.League fad meant all teams had to cut expenses. This meant Verdy could no longer buy expensive replacements for its aging stars.

The 1996 J.League season saw Verdy Kawasaki finish in 7th place overall, the lowest standing in the league's existence at that point, and would fall further in the 1997 season, finishing 16th and 12th, in the 1st stage and 2nd stage, respectively, and 15th overall out of 17 teams. Although Verdy looked to return to prominence in 1999, finishing 2nd in the 1st Stage, the resurgence was short-lived as it fell to 10th in the 2nd stage.

Meanwhile, the team's efforts to become "Japan's Team" alienated local fans in Kawasaki. The expensive salaries and struggling attendance caused the club's debts to mount. Struggling to compete with the newly professionalized crosstown rival Kawasaki Frontale and the nearby Yokohama Marinos and Yokohama Flügels, Verdy made the decision to leave Kawasaki.

=== Return to Tokyo (2001–2005) ===
In 2001, the club returned from Kawasaki to Chōfu, Tokyo and was renamed as Tokyo Verdy 1969 to reflect the new hometown and the club's origins as Yomiuri. Although Verdy made the move to increase its fan base and distance itself from its rivals, by this time Tokyo was already home to a J1 club in FC Tokyo. Despite a sharp increase in crowd numbers for Verdy, this was still well below those of FC Tokyo. Their new local rivals had been promoted to J1 in 2000 and had already captured a vast number of the supporters Verdy had been hoping to attract.

In its first year in Tokyo, Tokyo Verdy 1969 found itself trailing FC Tokyo in the standings as well, and finished last in the division at 16th in the first stage of the 2001 season. Only the play of midseason acquisition Edmundo and a win in the final match of the second stage saved the club from relegation to J2. Tokyo Verdy was back at the bottom of the table in the first stage of the 2002 season, but again finished the season strong, placing 4th in the second stage.

Two mid-table finishes followed in 2003 and 2004, before Tokyo Verdy, under Osvaldo Ardiles, won the Emperor's Cup on 1 January 2005, its first major title in 9 years and the first in Tokyo. Winning the cup earned Verdy a spot in the 2006 AFC Champions League.

However, the 2005 season saw Tokyo Verdy 1969 fall to its worst finish of its history, finishing 17th out of 18. This was the first season after the scrapping of the two-stage season format, and Tokyo Verdy were relegated to J2, after 28 years of top flight football. The season was marked by three huge losses in July: 1–7 to Gamba Osaka on 2 July, 0–7 to Urawa Red Diamonds on 6 July and a 6–0 loss to Júbilo Iwata on 17 July. Tokyo Verdy then sacked Ardiles two days later. At the time of his sacking, Ardiles' team had conceded 23 goals in their last 5 matches and had a 9 match winless streak. However, the struggling Verdy upset European giant Real Madrid (who were in Asia on a preseason tour), 3–0 on 25 July.

=== Brief promotion (2007–2008) ===
For the 2006 season, the club appointed former Verdy Kawasaki legend, Ruy Ramos, as manager on 22 December 2005. Tokyo Verdy 1969 found itself in the odd position of competing in the AFC Champions League while playing in the second tier of the national league system. After Tokyo Verdy 1969 was relegated, the club released many of the veteran players, leaving a core of young players, most notably Takayuki Morimoto, who became the youngest player to score in the J.League at age 15 in 2004.

In the 2007 season, Tokyo Verdy managed to beat Thespa Kusatsu 5–0 on the first day. After a brief scuffle with Consadole Sapporo over the J2 title, Tokyo Verdy 1969 had to settle for runners-up position, enough to earn promotion back into the top flight for 2008. At this time the club renamed itself for the second time, dropping 1969 from its team name, but the management corporation name remained as Tokyo Verdy 1969.

Verdy would eventually be relegated once again after finishing in 17th place (second to last) in their 2008 J1 League return.

=== Back to the second tier (2009–2023) ===
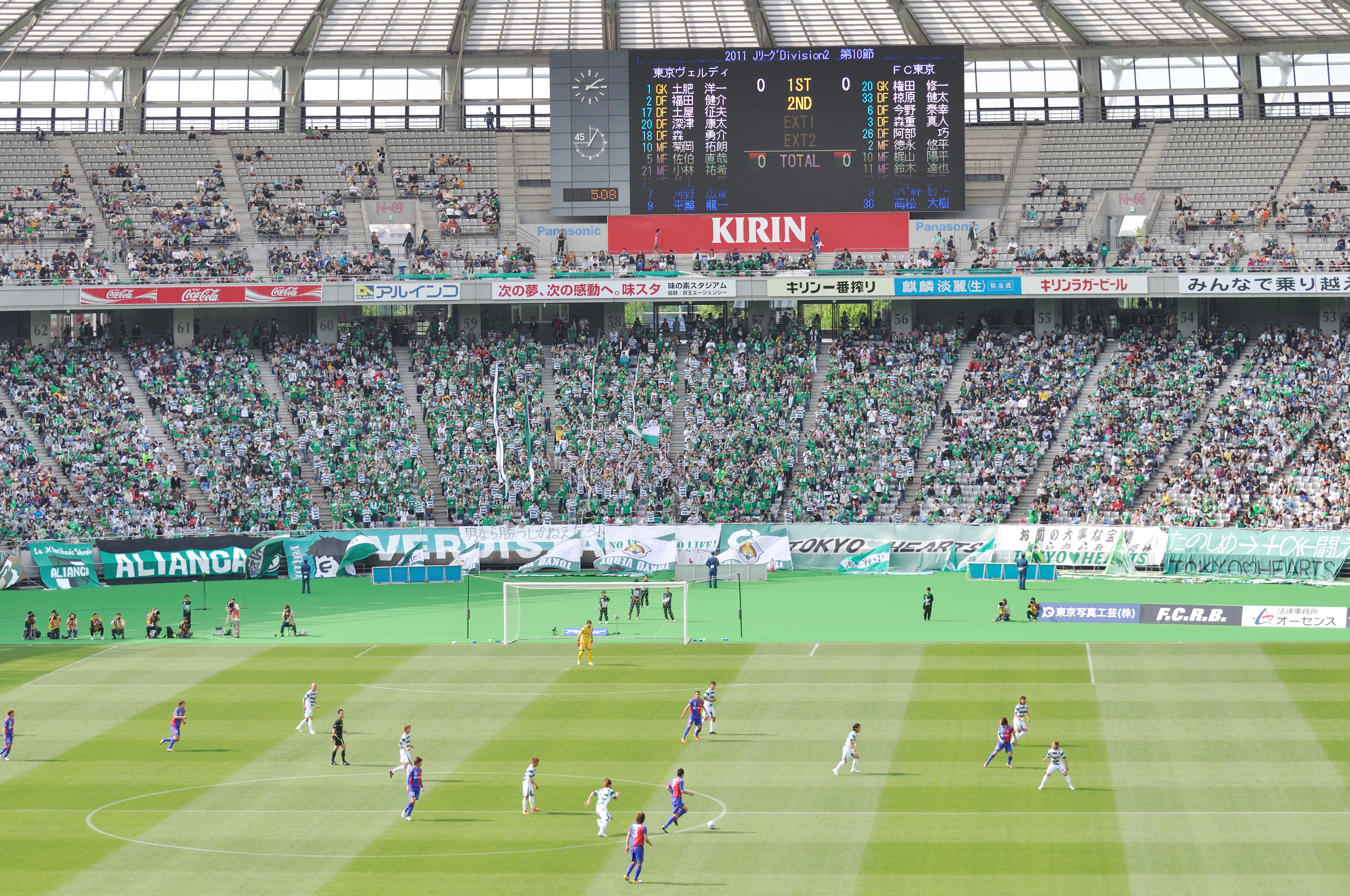
Tokyo Verdy contesting in the Tokyo derby against FC Tokyo in 2011

On 17 September 2009, NTV announced it would divest itself of shares in the club and transfer it to a new holding company, Tokyo Verdy Holdings, ending 40 years of Yomiuri/NTV direct financial support. The J.League approved the transfer, but made it a condition that Verdy find a new sponsor by 16 November or risk not being able to play J2 football for the 2010 season.

In October 2010, Tokyo Verdy signed a five-year sponsorship deal with sports retail store and apparel company Xebio. The sponsorship deal saw the Xebio logo placed on Tokyo Verdy's kit and included naming rights for two regular season home games. Xebio also produced the clubs football kit, although under their sports brand "Ennerre". After talks with Xebio, several companies decided to invest in the company and the new Xebio led administration was announced in November.

The club suffered a mere respite from heartbreak during the 2018 season, when they finished 6th, qualifying then for the promotion/relegation playoffs. They beat Omiya Ardija 1–0 in the 1st round, and repeated the script against Yokohama FC in the semi-final. They ended just one game short of a J1 League comeback, having lost in the final by 2–0 against Júbilo Iwata, which saw the promotion hopes fade away for another time. Ever since being relegated to the J2 at the end of 2008 season, the club were unable to return to the J1 and continue to compete in J2 League until 2023 season.

=== Return to the top-flight (2024–present) ===
On 2 December 2023, Tokyo Verdy gained promotion to the J1 League for the 2024 season after a 1–1 draw against Shimizu S-Pulse in the promotion play-off final, when Itsuki Someno scored the equalizer from the penalty spot in the 96th minute. As a result, Verdy, who were the top-ranked side entering the J2 League playoffs, returned to the national top tier for the first time since 2008.

== Team image ==
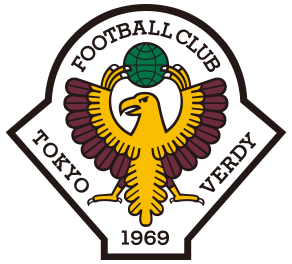
Tokyo Verdy former crest (2009–2019)

The identity of Tokyo Verdy is strongly associated with its distinctive green colour, which has been the club's primary colour since its foundation as Yomiuri in 1969. Because of this, the club is often simply referred to as "Verdy," derived from the Portuguese, Spanish and Italian word verde, meaning green.

The club's crest has undergone several changes throughout its history, reflecting shifts in identity and ownership. The emblem typically incorporates elements symbolising strength and tradition, including a stylised bird and shield design. The name "Verdy" itself was adopted when the club became Verdy Kawasaki during the early years of the J.League.

Tokyo Verdy has historically been known for its emphasis on youth development, producing many notable Japanese footballers who have gone on to represent the Japan national football team. The club's academy system has long been regarded as one of the most influential in Japanese football.

=== Rivalries ===
==== Tokyo Derby ====
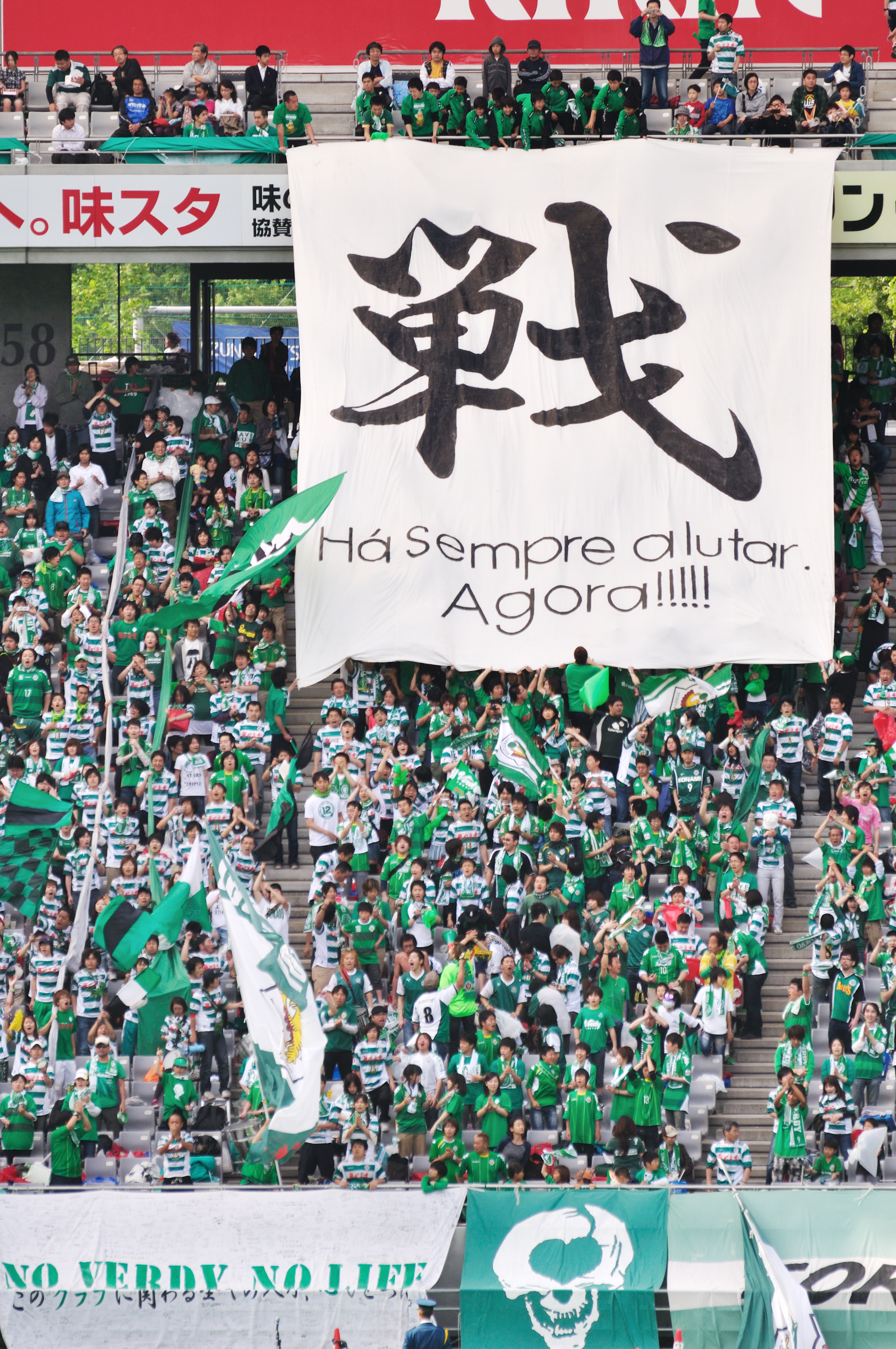
Tokyo Verdy fans in the Tokyo Derby in 2011

The principal rivalry of Tokyo Verdy is with fellow Tokyo-based club FC Tokyo. Matches between the two teams are known as the Tokyo Derby. The rivalry developed after FC Tokyo joined the professional leagues in the late 1990s and became the other major club representing Tokyo in the J.League. The derby reflects competition for football prominence within the Japanese capital. These encounters are often played at Ajinomoto Stadium, which both clubs have used as their home venue. Matches between the two sides regularly attract large crowds and strong interest from supporters.

==== Tama River Derby ====
Tokyo Verdy also shares a historical rivalry with Kawasaki Frontale, known as the Tama River Derby. The rivalry originates from the period when Verdy was based in Kawasaki and competed with other clubs in the region for local dominance.

Although the clubs are now based in different cities, matches between Tokyo Verdy and Kawasaki Frontale continue to carry historical significance due to their shared past and geographic proximity along the Tama River region.

=== Other sports ===
Verdy is a polideportivo and also fields teams in women's football, volleyball, and triathlon. Nippon TV Tokyo Verdy Beleza, which is the women team of Tokyo Verdy, is the 12 time Nadeshiko League champions, 14 time Empress's Cup winners and 1 time AFC Women's Club Championship winners.

== Stadium ==
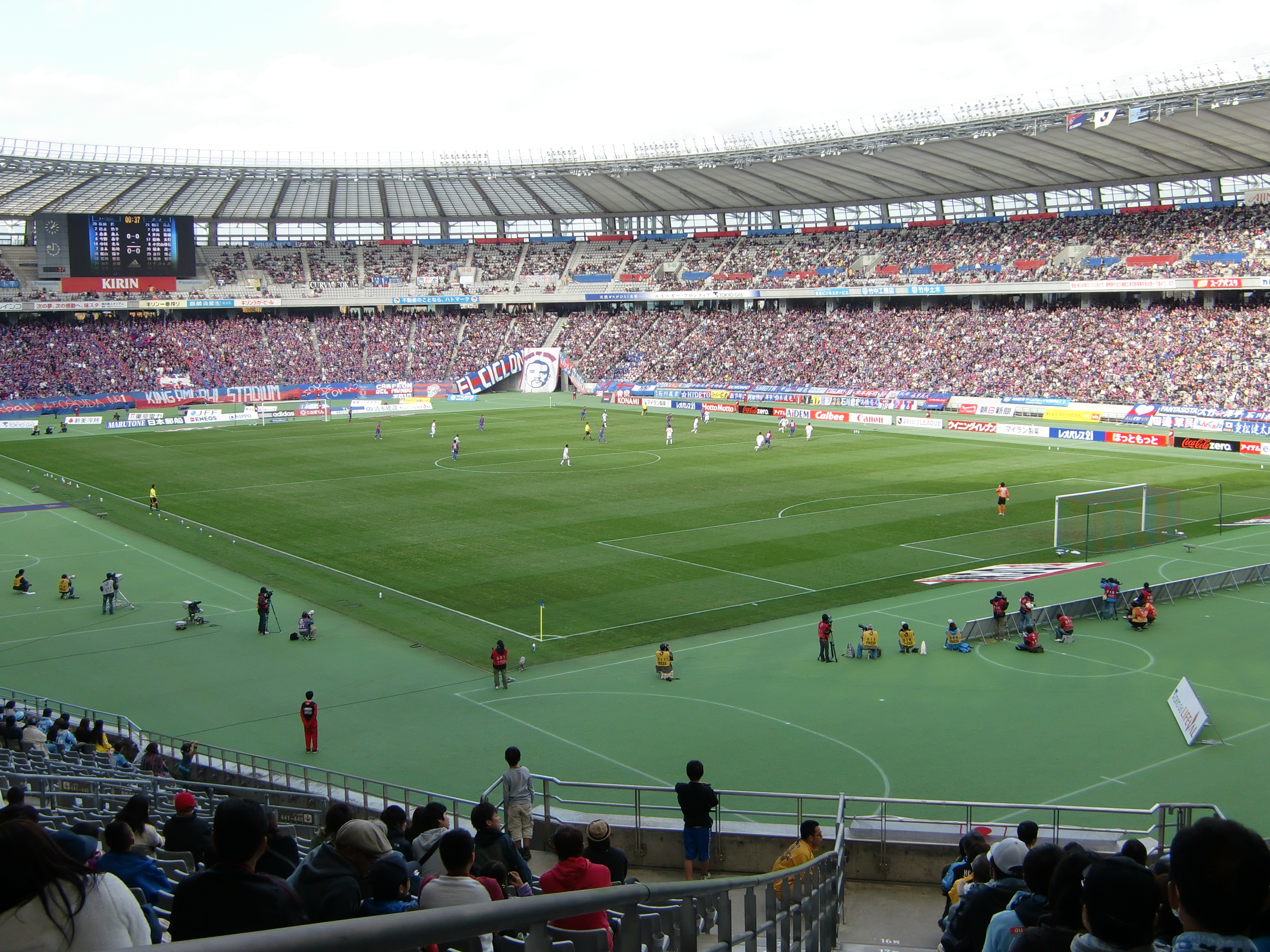
Ajinomoto Stadium

Verdy plays its home games at the Ajinomoto Stadium, a multi-purpose stadium located in the western part of Tokyo with a capacity of 49,970 and serves as one of the major football venues in the Japanese capital. Tokyo Verdy shares the stadium with city rivals FC Tokyo, although occasional home matches are played in other stadiums in Tokyo, such as the Ajinomoto Field Nishigaoka.

In addition to league matches, the stadium has hosted numerous domestic cup competitions within the J.League system, including fixtures in the Emperor's Cup and the J.League Cup. The stadium’s large capacity and modern facilities have made it an important venue for major football events in Tokyo.

Before relocating to Tokyo, the club played its home matches in Kawasaki, including at Uvance Todoroki Stadium by Fujitsu during its early years as Verdy Kawasaki.

== Kit suppliers and shirt sponsors ==
Tokyo Verdy's main colors are green.

The club's name was coined from the Portuguese, or Spanish, or Italian, or Esperanto "verde" meaning "green", probably named after their green jersey colour, so the meaning is "Tokyo Greens/Tokyo Verdi". In Italian, the form "verdi" indicates the plural form "the greens".

=== Sponsors ===
Year	Kit manufacturer	Main sponsor
1992	(Germany) Puma	(United States) Coca-Cola
1993–1995	(Japan) Mizuno	(United States) Coca-Cola
1996	(Japan) Mizuno	(Japan) MALT'S
1997–1998	(United States) Nike	(Japan) MALT'S
1999–2001	(United States) Nike	(Japan) KONAMI
2002–2003	(United States) Nike	(Japan) Rakuten; ICHIBA
2004	(United States) Nike	(Japan) LEOC
2005–2006	(United States) Nike	(Japan) CyberAgent (J2) (Japan) Nippon Television (ACL)
2007–2008	(Italy) Kappa	(Japan) Ameba
2009	(Italy) Kappa	No main sponsor
2010	(Italy) Kappa	(Japan) XEBIO
2011	(Japan) ennerre	(Japan) Īdasangyō
2012	(Japan) Athleta	(Japan) Īdasangyō
2013	(Japan) Athleta	(Japan) GAGA MILANO
2014–2015	(Japan) Athleta	(Japan) Midori no shinzō
2016	(Japan) Athleta	(Japan) Create
2017–2018	(Japan) Athleta	(Japan) ISPS HANDA
2019–2020	(Japan) Athleta	(Japan) Akatsuki
2021–	(Japan) Athleta	(Japan) NICIGAS

=== Kit evolution ===
1st – Home
1992	1993–1994	1995–1996	1997	1998
1999–2000	2001–2002	2003–2004	2005–2006	2007
2008	2009	2010	2011	2012
2013	2014	2015	2016	2017
2018	2019	2020	2021	2022
2023	2024	2025	2026 -	

2nd – Away
1992	1993–1994	1995–1996	1997	1998
1999–2000	2001–2002	2003–2004	2005–2006	2007
2008	2009	2010	2011	2012
2013	2014	2015	2016	2017
2018	2019	2020	2021	2022
2023	2024 –	2025	2026 -	

3rd – Special
1995 - 1996; CUP 1st	1995 - 1996; CUP 2nd	2012 3rd	2019; Anniversary	2020 3rd
2021 3rd	2021; Athleta; Contract 10th Anniversary	2022 3rd	2023 3rd	2024 3rd
2024; Nichigas; DAY	2025 3rd	2025; Nichigas; DAY		

== Players ==
=== First-team squad ===
As of 9 October 2026.

Note: Flags indicate national team as defined under FIFA eligibility rules; some limited exceptions apply. Players may hold more than one non-FIFA nationality.

No.	Pos.	Nation	Player
1	GK	BRA	Matheus Vidotto (vice-captain)
2	MF	JPN	Kai Shibato
4	DF	JPN	Naoki Hayashi (vice-captain)
5	DF	JPN	Ryota Inoue
6	DF	JPN	Kazuya Miyahara
7	MF	JPN	Yuan Matsuhashi
8	MF	JPN	Kosuke Saito
9	FW	JPN	Itsuki Someno
10	MF	JPN	Koki Morita (captain)
11	FW	JPN	Hiroto Yamami
13	FW	JPN	Gōki Yamada
14	MF	JPN	Yuya Fukuda
15	DF	JPN	Kaito Suzuki
16	MF	JPN	Rei Hirakawa
17	FW	KOR	Kim Hyun-woo
18	DF	JPN	Shuhei Mizoguchi (on loan from Kashima Antlers)
19	MF	JPN	Kanya Fujimoto (on loan from (England) Birmingham City)
20	MF	JPN	Soma Meshino
21	GK	JPN	Yuya Nagasawa
22	DF	JPN	Yosuke Uchida
24	MF	JPN	Shion Nakayama
25	FW	JPN	Issei Kumatoriya

No.	Pos.	Nation	Player
27	FW	JPN	Ryosuke Shirai
28	MF	JPN	Joi Yamamoto
29	DF	JPN	Maaya Sako
30	MF	JPN	Gakuto Kawamura
31	GK	JPN	Hiroki Mawatari
33	FW	JPN	Kazunari Ichimi
35	DF	JPN	Shuto Tanabe
36	DF	JPN	Riku Matsuda
38	FW	JPN	Soma Kanda (on loan from Kawasaki Frontale)
40	MF	JPN	Yuta Arai
41	GK	JPN	Keisuke Nakamura
42	MF	JPN	Kento Imai
44	DF	JPN	Yoshiki Takushima ^{DSP}
45	FW	JPN	Shimon Teranuma
47	DF	JPN	Haruki Watanabe ^{Type 2}
50	DF	JPN	Cheick Sezar Camara ^{Type 2}
51	FW	JPN	Sota Ofuji
55	DF	JPN	Taiju Yoshida
61	GK	JPN	Koki Takahashi ^{DSP}
71	FW	JPN	Hayato Hirao
96	DF	KOR	Cho Yu-min

=== Out on loan ===
Note: Flags indicate national team as defined under FIFA eligibility rules; some limited exceptions apply. Players may hold more than one non-FIFA nationality.

No.	Pos.	Nation	Player

== Management and staff ==
Position	Staff
Manager	(Japan) Naoki Sōma
Assistant managers	(Japan) Ichiro Wada (Japan) Hitoshi Morishita (Japan) Yuta Narawa
Goalkeeper coach	(Japan) Atsushi Shirai
Conditioning coach	(Japan) Yuya Noshiro
Analytical coach	(Japan) Daiki Yamamoto
Interpreter	(Japan) Genta Iwauchi
Doctor	(Japan) Kenta Uemura
Trainer	(Japan) Naoki Matsuda (Japan) Shuji Ogawa (Japan) Yusuke Kaneuchi (Japan) Hiroyoshi Mutaguchi
Side manager	(Japan) Hideki Sato
Equipment manager	(Japan) Ryo Ito (Japan) Jun Yamato
Training coach	(Singapore) Noh Alam Shah (Singapore) Isa Halim

== Honours ==
With seven tier one league titles, five Emperor's Cups and six League Cups, Tokyo Verdy is one of the most decorated football clubs in Japan, although nearly all of its titles, came during their stay at Tokyo in the semi-professional era as Yomiuri FC, before the inception of the professional J.League.

Type	Honours	Titles	Season
League	J1 League	2	1993, 1994
League	Japan Soccer League Division 1	5	1983, 1984, 1986–87, 1990–91, 1991–92
League	Japan Soccer League Division 2	2	1974, 1977
Cup	Emperor's Cup	5	1984, 1986, 1987, 1996, 2004
Cup	J.League Cup	3	1992, 1993, 1994
Cup	Japanese Super Cup	4	1984, 1994, 1995, 2005
Cup	JSL Cup	3	1979, 1985, 1991
Continental	Asian Club Championship	1	1987
Worldwide	Sanwa Bank Cup	1	1994

Bold is for those competition that are currently active.

== Record and statistics ==
As of 27 March 2026.

Top 10 all-time appearances
Rank	Player	Years	Club appearance
1	(Japan) Kazuki Hiramoto	1999–2017	383
2	(Japan) Tsuyoshi Kitazawa	1991–2002	332
3	(Japan) Kazunori Iio	1999–2013	306
4	(Japan) Kentaro Hayashi	1995–2005	302
5	(Japan) Takuya Yamada	1997–2005	287
6	(Japan) Shinkichi Kikuchi	1986–2001	258
7	(Japan) Koki Morita	2018–present	242
8	(Japan) Ryota Kajikawa	2011–2012, 2017–2019, 2021–2023	241
9	(Japan) Akira Ibayashi	2013–2018	239
10	(Japan) Atsushi Yoneyama	1998–2005	238

Top 10 all-time goalscorer
Rank	Player	Club appearance	Total goals
1	(Japan) Kazuyoshi Miura	199	113
2	(Japan) Nobuhiro Takeda	191	75
3	(Japan) Kazuki Hiramoto	383	70
4	(Brazil) Bismarck	171	54
5	(Japan) Tsuyoshi Kitazawa	332	53
6	(Japan) Junki Koike	218	51
7	(Brazil) Hulk	56	45
8	(Japan) Takuma Abe	97	39
8	(Brazil) Douglas Vieira	116	39
10	(Japan) Kazunori Iio	306	33

- Biggest wins: 9–1 vs (Pakistan) Crescent Textiles Mill (3 March 1995)
- Heaviest defeats:
  - 0–7 vs Urawa Red Diamonds (6 July 2005)
  - 0–7 vs Albirex Niigata (27 March 221)
- Youngest ever debutant: Takayuki Morimoto ~ 15 years 10 months 6 days old (On 13 March 2004 vs Júbilo Iwata)
- Oldest ever player: Hideki Nagai ~ 45 years 9 months 17 days old (On 12 November 2019 vs Cerezo Osaka)
- Youngest goal scorers: Takayuki Morimoto ~ 15 years 11 months 28 days old (On 5 May 2004 vs JEF United Chiba)
- Oldest goal scorers: Ruy Ramos ~ 38 years 8 months 26 days old (On 4 November 1995 vs Shimizu S-Pulse)

== Award winners ==
As of the end of the 2025 season.

- J.League Player of the Year:

- (Japan) Kazuyoshi Miura (1993)
- (Brazil) Pereira (1994)

- J.League Top Scorer:

- (Japan) Kazuyoshi Miura (1996)

- J.League Best XI:
- J1 League
  - (Japan) Kazuyoshi Miura (1993, 1995, 1996)
  - (Japan) Tetsuji Hashiratani (1993, 1994, 1995)
  - (Japan) Ruy Ramos (1993, 1994)
  - (Brazil) Pereira (1993, 1994)
  - (Japan) Tsuyoshi Kitazawa (1994)
  - (Japan) Nobuhiro Takeda (1994)
  - (Japan) Shinkichi Kikuchi (1994, 1995)
  - (Brazil) Bismarck (1994, 1995)
  - (Japan) Yuji Nakazawa (1999)
- J2 League
  - (Japan) Kazuya Miyahara (2023)
  - (Japan) Koki Morita (2023)
- J.League Best Young Player:
  - (Japan) Yuji Nakazawa (1999)
  - (Japan) Takayuki Morimoto (2004)
- Individual Fair Play Award
  - (Japan) Atsushi Yoneyama (2000)
- J.League Manager of the Year:
  - (Japan) Yasutaro Matsuki (1993, 1994)
- J2 League Top Scorer:
  - (Brazil) Hulk (2007)

== Managerial history ==
Manager	Period	Honours
(Japan) Jujiro Narita	1 February 1970 – 30 June 1973	
(Netherlands) Frans van Balkom	1 February 1973 – 31 January 1976	– 1974 Japan Soccer League Division 2
(Japan) Shoichi Nishimura	1 February 1976 – 31 January 1981	– 1977 Japan Soccer League Division 2 – 1979 JSL Cup
(Japan) Ryoichi Aikawa	1 February 1981 – 30 June 1983	
(Japan) Susumu Chiba	1 July 1983 – 31 January 1984	– 1983 Japan Soccer League Division 1
(Germany) Rudi Gutendorf	1 January 1984 – 30 June 1986	– 1984 Japan Soccer League Division 1 – 1984 Emperor's Cup – 1985 JSL Cup
(Japan) George Yonashiro	1 July 1986 – 30 June 1989	– 1986 Emperor's Cup – 1986–87 Japan Soccer League Division 1 – 1987 Emperor's Cup – 1987 Asian Club Championship
(Brazil) Carlos Alberto Silva	1 July 1990 – 30 June 1991	– 1990–91 Japan Soccer League Division 1
(Brazil) Pepe	1 January 1991 – 31 December 1992	– 1991 JSL Cup – 1991–92 Japan Soccer League Division 1 – 1992 J.League Cup
(Japan) Yasutarō Matsuki	1 February 1993 – 31 January 1995	– 1993 J.League – 1993 J.League Cup – 1994 J.League – 1994 J.League Cup – 1994 Japanese Super Cup – 1994 Sanwa Bank Cup
(Brazil) Nelsinho Baptista	1 February 1995 – 25 April 1996	– 1995 Japanese Super Cup
(Japan) Yasuyuki Kishino	26 April 1996 – 9 May 1996	– 1996 Emperor's Cup
(Brazil) Émerson Leão	10 May 1996 – 31 January 1997	
(Japan) Hisashi Katō	1 February 1997 – 1 June 1997	
(Brazil) Valdir Espinosa	2 June 1997 – 30 October 1997	
(Japan) Ryōichi Kawakatsu	1 November 1997 – 31 January 1998	
(Brazil) Nicanor	1 February 1998 – 7 September 1998	
(Japan) Ryōichi Kawakatsu (2)	8 September 1998 – 31 January 1999	
(Japan) Hideki Matsunaga	1 February 1999 – 31 January 2000	
(South Korea) Chang Woe-ryong	1 February 2000 – 1 January 2001	
(Japan) Yasutarō Matsuki (2)	1 February 2001 – 16 July 2001	
(Japan) Yukitaka Omi	17 July 2001 – 9 April 2002	
(Brazil) Lori Paulo Sandri	1 January 2002 – 30 June 2003	
(Argentina) Osvaldo Ardiles	16 May 2003 – 18 July 2005	– 2004 Emperor's Cup – 2005 Japanese Super Cup
(Japan) Nobuhiro Ishizaki	19 July 2005 – 31 July 2005	
(Brazil) Vadão	1 August 2005 – 14 December 2005	
(Japan) Ruy Ramos	1 February 2006 – 31 January 2008	
(Japan) Tetsuji Hashiratani	1 February 2008 – 31 January 2009	
(Japan) Takuya Takagi	1 February 2009 – 14 October 2009	
(Japan) Takeo Matsuda	14 October 2009 – 31 January 2010	
(Japan) Ryōichi Kawakatsu (3)	1 February 2010 – 6 September 2012	
(Japan) Shinichiro Takahashi	6 September 2012 – 31 January 2013	
(Japan) Yasutoshi Miura	1 February 2013 – 15 September 2014	
(Japan) Kōichi Togashi	1 September 2014 – 31 December 2016	
(Spain) Miguel Ángel Lotina	1 February 2017 – 31 January 2019	
(England) Gary White	1 February 2019 – 17 July 2019	
(Japan) Hideki Nagai	17 July 2019 – 1 September 2021	
(Japan) Takafumi Hori	2 September 2021 – 13 June 2022	
(Japan) Hiroshi Jofuku	14 June 2022– 5 October 2026	
(Japan) Naoki Sōma	8 October 2026 - present	

== Season by season record ==
Champions	Runners-up	Third place	Promoted	Relegated

Season	Div.	Teams	Pos.	P	W (OTW/PKW)	D	L (OTL/PKL)	F	A	GD	Pts	Attendance/G	J.League Cup	Emperor's Cup	Asia	
Verdy Kawasaki
1992	–	–	–									–	Winner	Runners-up	CC	2nd round
1993	J1	10	1st	36	28		8	69	28	41		25,235	Winner	Quarter final	CC	4th place
1994	J1	12	1st	44	31		13	91	47	44		24,926	Winner	2nd round	CC	3rd place
1995	J1	14	2nd	52	35		13 (-/3)	106	62	44	108	20,834	–	Quarter final	CC	Quarter final
1996	J1	16	7th	30	19		11 (-/0)	68	42	26	57	17,653	Runners-Up	Winner	CC	Quarter final
1997	J1	17	15th	32	6 (4/0)		19 (1/2)	38	65	−27	26	10,933	Group stage	3rd round	–	–
1998	J1	18	12th	34	13 (0/0)		17 (2/2)	47	53	−6	39	13,338	Group stage	Quarter-final	CWC	Quarter final
1999	J1	16	7th	30	13 (4/-)	2	9 (2/-)	43	43	0	49	9,379	2nd round	Semi-final	–	–
2000	J1	16	10th	30	10 (2/-)	4	10 (4/0)	46	44	2	38	7,609	Quarter final	4th round	–	–
Tokyo Verdy 1969
2001	J1	16	14th	30	8 (2/-)	2	13 (5/-)	38	57	−19	30	19,396	1st round	Quarter final	–	–
2002	J1	16	10th	30	8 (5/-)	3	14	41	43	−2	39	15,128	Group stage	3rd round	–	–
2003	J1	16	8th	30	11	7	12	56	57	−1	40	17,563	Group stage	Quarter final	–	–
2004	J1	16	9th	30	11	6	13	43	46	−3	39	15,059	Semi-final	Winner	–	–
2005	J1	18	17th	34	6	12	16	40	73	−33	30	14,716	Group stage	4th round	–	–
2006	J2	13	7th	48	21	8	19	69	75	−6	71	5,705	Not eligible	3rd round	CL	Group stage
2007	J2	13	2nd	48	26	11	11	90	57	33	89	7,327	Not eligible	3rd round	–	–
Tokyo Verdy
2008	J1	18	17th	34	10	7	17	38	50	−12	37	14,837	Group stage	4th round	–	–
2009	J2	18	7th	51	21	11	19	68	61	7	74	5,521	Not eligible	2nd round	–	–
2010	J2	19	5th	36	17	7	12	47	34	13	58	5,572	Not eligible	2nd round	–	–
2011	J2	20	5th	38	16	11	11	69	45	24	59	5,710	Not eligible	3rd round	–	–
2012	J2	22	7th	42	20	6	16	65	46	19	66	5,341	Not eligible	3rd round	–	–
2013	J2	22	13th	42	14	14	14	52	58	−6	56	6,343	Not eligible	3rd round	–	–
2014	J2	22	20th	42	9	15	18	31	48	−17	42	5,430	Not eligible	2nd round	–	–
2015	J2	22	8th	42	16	10	16	43	41	2	58	5,655	Not eligible	2nd round	–	–
2016	J2	22	18th	42	10	13	19	43	61	−18	43	5,402	Not eligible	3rd round	–	–
2017	J2	22	5th	42	20	10	12	64	49	15	70	6,206	Not eligible	2nd round	–	–
2018	J2	22	6th	42	19	14	9	56	41	15	71	5,936	Not eligible	4th round	–	–
2019	J2	22	13th	42	14	13	15	59	59	0	55	5,371	Not eligible	2nd round	–	–
2020 †	J2	22	12th	42	13	15	14	48	48	0	54	2,429	Not eligible	Did not qualify	–	–
2021 †	J2	22	12th	42	16	10	16	62	66	−4	58	3,246	Not eligible	2nd round	–	–
2022	J2	22	9th	42	16	13	13	62	55	7	61	4,955	Not eligible	Quarter-finals	–	–
2023	J2	22	3rd	42	21	12	9	57	31	26	75	7,982	Not eligible	3rd round	–	–
2024	J1	20	6th	38	14	14	10	51	51	0	56	20,976	3rd round	3rd round	–	–
2025	J1	20	17th	38	11	10	17	23	41	-18	43	21,121	Playoff round	4th round	–	–
2026	J1	10	TBD	18									N/A	N/A	–	–
2026-27	J1	20	TBD	38									TBD	TBD		

Key

- Pos. = Position in league; P = Games played; W = Games won; D = Games drawn; L = Games lost; F = Goals scored; A = Goals conceded; GD = Goals difference; Pts = Points gained
- OTW / PKW = Overtime wins / Penalty kicks wins 1997 & 1998 seasons – 1999, 2000, 2001 & 2002 Overtime wins only
- OTL / PKL = Overtime losses / Penalty kicks losses 1997 and 1998 seasons – 1999, 2000 & 2001 Overtime losses only
- Attendance/G = Average home league attendance
- † 2020 & 2021 seasons attendances reduced by COVID-19 worldwide pandemic
- Source: J. League Data Site

== See also ==
- Nippon TV Tokyo Verdy Beleza (Women's club team)
- Japan Soccer League (Defunct)
- J.League
- J1 League
- J2 League
- J3 League

== Notes ==
Achievements
Preceded by Furukawa Electric (Japan)	Champions of Asia; 1987–88	Succeeded by Al-Sadd (Qatar)
