= 1984 Emperor's Cup =

Tournament details
- Country: Japan

Final positions
- Champions: Yomiuri FC (1st title)
- Runners-up: Furukawa Electric
- Semifinalists: Nissan Motors; Yamaha Motors

Statistics of Emperor's Cup in the 1984 season.

== Overview ==
It was contested by 32 teams, and Yomiuri won the championship.

== Results ==
=== 1st round ===
- Nissan Motors 6–0 Mazda Auto Hiroshima
- NTT Kinki 0–1 Mazda
- Kyushu Sangyo University 1–2 Tanabe Pharmaceuticals
- Fukuoka University 1–1 (PK 4–3) Mitsubishi Motors
- Honda 2–2 (PK 5–4) Tsukuba University
- Toyota Motors 2–3 Hitachi
- Kokushikan University 3–2 Sapporo University
- Fukushima FC 0–6 Furukawa Electric
- Yomiuri 2–1 Osaka University of Health and Sport Sciences
- Nippon Steel 1–4 Teijin
- Nippon Kokan 0–1 Matsushita Electric
- Nissei Plastic Industry 0–3 Yanmar Diesel
- Fujita Industries 4–0 Sumitomo Metals
- Aichi Gakuin University 3–1 TDK
- Seino Transportation 1–3 Toshiba
- Kofu Club 0–3 Yamaha Motors

=== 2nd round ===
- Nissan Motors 5–2 Mazda
- Tanabe Pharmaceuticals 1–0 Fukuoka University
- Honda 1–0 Hitachi
- Kokushikan University 0–1 Furukawa Electric
- Yomiuri 5–0 Teijin
- Matsushita Electric 0–2 Yanmar Diesel
- Fujita Industries 4–0 Aichi Gakuin University
- Toshiba 0–2 Yamaha Motors

=== Quarterfinals ===
- Nissan Motors 2–1 Tanabe Pharmaceuticals
- Honda 0–1 Furukawa Electric
- Yomiuri 2–0 Yanmar Diesel
- Fujita Industries 0–1 Yamaha Motors

=== Semifinals ===
- Nissan Motors 0–0 (PK 3–5) Furukawa Electric
- Yomiuri 2–1 Yamaha Motors

=== Final ===
- Furukawa Electric 0–2 Yomiuri

Yomiuri won the championship.
