= 1979 JSL Cup =

Tournament details
- Country: Japan

Final positions
- Champions: Yomiuri
- Runners-up: Furukawa Electric
- Semifinalists: Fujitsu; Mitsubishi Motors

Statistics of JSL Cup in the 1979 season.

== Overview ==
It was contested by 20 teams, and Yomiuri won the championship.

== Results ==
=== 1st round ===
- Yanmar Diesel 5-0 Toshiba Horikawa
- Nippon Steel 2-1 Kofu
- Mitsubishi Motors 2-1 Toyo Industries
- Furukawa Electric 2-0 Nippon Kokan

=== 2nd round ===
- Yamaha Motors 3-1 Nissan Motors
- Yanmar Diesel 1-2 Yomiuri
- Toyota Motors 1-1 (PK 5–4) Nippon Steel
- Teijin Matsuyama 1-2 Fujitsu
- Fujita Industries 2-0 Sumitomo Metals
- Mitsubishi Motors 1-0 Yanmar Club
- Honda 0-1 Furukawa Electric
- Hitachi 4-0 Tanabe Pharmaceuticals

=== Quarterfinals ===
- Yamaha Motors 2-4 Yomiuri
- Toyota Motors 1-2 Fujitsu
- Fujita Industries 0-3 Mitsubishi Motors
- Furukawa Electric 2-1 Hitachi

=== Semifinals ===
- Yomiuri 3-3 (PK 4–3) Fujitsu
- Mitsubishi Motors 2-2 (PK 5–4) Furukawa Electric

=== Final ===
- Yomiuri 3-2 Furukawa Electric

Yomiuri won the championship
