= 1985 JSL Cup =

Tournament details
- Country: Japan

Final positions
- Champions: Yomiuri
- Runners-up: Nissan Motors
- Semifinalists: Furukawa Electric; Honda

Statistics of JSL Cup in the 1985 season.

== Overview ==
It was contested by 20 teams, and Yomiuri won the championship.

== Results ==
=== 1st round ===
- Yanmar Diesel 3-1 Kofu
- Nippon Kokan 5-0 Kyoto Police
- Sumitomo Metals 1-2 Matsushita Electric
- Furukawa Electric 5-1 Tanabe Pharmaceuticals
- Hitachi 0-1 Toshiba
- Mazda 1-1 (PK 5–6) Toyota Motors
- Honda 6-0 TDK
- Fujita Industries 2-0 Nippon Steel

=== 2nd round ===
- Nissan Motors 5-0 Yanmar Diesel
- Nippon Kokan 1-2 Mitsubishi Motors
- Seino Transportations 0-2 Matsushita Electric
- Furukawa Electric 4-1 Osaka Gas
- Yomiuri 5-2 Toshiba
- Toyota Motors 0-1 Yamaha Motors
- Fujitsu 0-3 Honda
- Fujita Industries 1-1 (PK 5–4) All Nippon Airways

=== Quarterfinals ===
- Nissan Motors 4-0 Mitsubishi Motors
- Matsushita Electric 0-1 Furukawa Electric
- Yomiuri 3-1 Yamaha Motors
- Honda 1-1 (PK 5–4) Fujita Industries

=== Semifinals ===
- Nissan Motors 1-0 Furukawa Electric
- Yomiuri 3-1 Honda

=== Final ===
- Nissan Motors 0-2 Yomiuri

Yomiuri won the championship
