= 1984 Japan Soccer League =

Annual soccer tournament

Japan Soccer League
- Season: 1984

Statistics of Japan Soccer League for the 1984 season. No promotion/relegation series for both division were held due to expansion of both divisions in the following season.

== First Division ==
No relegation took place due to expansion to 12 clubs.

Yomiuri was invited to the revived Asian Club Championship, but withdrew.

Japan Soccer League First Division
- Season: 1984
- Champions: Yomiuri; 2nd Title
- Runner up: Nissan
- Matches: 90
- Goals: 252 (2.8 per match)
- Top goalscorer: Tetsuya Totsuka (14 goals)

Pos	Team	Pld	W	D	L	GF	GA	GD	Pts	Qualification
1	Yomiuri	18	11	4	3	41	20	+21	26	Champions
2	Nissan	18	11	3	4	40	23	+17	25	
3	Yamaha Motors	18	10	4	4	28	16	+12	24	
4	Furukawa Electric	18	8	5	5	28	20	+8	21	
5	Honda	18	7	5	6	26	23	+3	19	
6	Fujita Engineering	18	6	6	6	25	25	0	18	
7	Mitsubishi Motors	18	6	3	9	22	33	−11	15	
8	Nippon Kokan	18	4	6	8	16	23	−7	14	
9	Yanmar Diesel	18	5	4	9	15	28	−13	14	
10	Hitachi	18	2	0	16	11	41	−30	4	

Source: RSSSF

== Second Division ==
No relegation took place due to expansion to 12 clubs.

Japan Soccer League Second Division
- Season: 1984
- Champions: Sumitomo
- Promoted: Sumitomo; ANA Yokohama
- Matches: 90
- Goals: 258 (2.87 per match)

Pos	Team	Pld	W	D	L	GF	GA	GD	Pts	Promotion
1	Sumitomo	18	10	6	2	40	23	+17	26	Promoted to First Division
2	ANA Yokohama	18	12	2	4	31	17	+14	26	Promoted to First Division
3	Matsushita Electric	18	8	6	4	25	19	+6	22	
4	Toshiba	18	9	4	5	29	25	+4	22	
5	Tanabe Pharmaceuticals	18	7	7	4	30	21	+9	21	
6	Mazda	18	7	4	7	24	20	+4	18	
7	Fujitsu	18	5	4	9	20	30	−10	14	
8	Toyota Motors	18	4	5	9	24	31	−7	13	
9	Nippon Steel	18	4	4	10	15	28	−13	12	
10	Kofu Club	18	1	4	13	20	44	−24	6	

Source: RSSSF
