= 1983 Japan Soccer League =

Japan Soccer League
- Season: 1983
- Teams: 10
- Champions: Yomiuri; 1st title
- Runner up: Nissan
- Matches: 90
- Goals: 193 (2.14 per match)
- Top goalscorer: Ruy Ramos (10 goals)

Statistics of Japan Soccer League for the 1983 season.

== First Division ==
Yomiuri, the football club became one of big names of earlier years of J.League as Verdy Kawasaki, and currently known as Tokyo Verdy, won its first of seven League championships, fully riding in the wave of its parent company's funds and prestige.

Mazda, five-time First Division champions in the 1960s, was relegated for the first time. Hitachi saved itself by defeating Sumitomo in the playout.

Pos	Team	Pld	W	D	L	GF	GA	GD	Pts	Qualification or relegation
1	Yomiuri	18	12	3	3	27	13	+14	27	Champions
2	Nissan	18	11	3	4	28	17	+11	25	
3	Fujita Engineering	18	7	7	4	18	15	+3	21	
4	Yamaha Motors	18	7	5	6	25	20	+5	19	
5	Yanmar Diesel	18	6	7	5	19	21	−2	19	
6	Mitsubishi Motors	18	6	4	8	17	16	+1	16	
7	Furukawa Electric	18	6	3	9	13	15	−2	15	
8	Honda	18	4	6	8	17	23	−6	14	
9	Hitachi	18	3	6	9	14	22	−8	12	To promotion/relegation Series
10	Mazda	18	5	2	11	15	31	−16	12	Relegated to Second Division

Source: RSSSF

=== Promotion/relegation Series ===
JSL Division 1	1st leg	2nd leg	JSL Division 2
Hitachi	3-2	1-0	Sumitomo

== Second Division ==
NKK returned to the top flight at the first time of asking.

Saitama Teachers went back to the Kantō regional league, and Toho Titanium followed when they lost the playout to Matsushita, a rising club at the time based in Nara which would eventually become Gamba Osaka.

Pos	Team	Pld	W	D	L	GF	GA	GD	Pts	Promotion or relegation
1	Nippon Kokan	18	13	4	1	39	12	+27	30	Promoted to First Division
2	Sumitomo	18	8	8	2	33	27	+6	24	To promotion/relegation Series with First Division
3	Toshiba	18	9	3	6	38	22	+16	21	
4	Nippon Steel	18	7	5	6	29	21	+8	19	
5	Tanabe Pharmaceuticals	18	7	4	7	29	29	0	18	
6	Toyota Motors	18	7	4	7	22	30	−8	18	
7	Fujitsu	18	6	3	9	24	27	−3	15	
8	Kofu Club	18	4	6	8	29	40	−11	14	
9	Toho Titanium	18	5	2	11	21	42	−21	12	To promotion/relegation Series with Regional Series
10	Saitama Teachers	18	4	1	13	14	28	−14	9	Relegated to Regional Leagues

Source: RSSSF

=== Promotion/relegation Series ===
JSL	1st leg	2nd leg	Regional Series
Toho Titanium	1-2	0-0	Matsushita Electric (runner-up)
