= 1979 Emperor's Cup final =

1979 Emperor's Cup Final
Fujita Industries	Mitsubishi Motors
2	1
- Date: January 1, 1980
- Venue: National Stadium, Tokyo

1979 Emperor's Cup Final was the 59th final of the Emperor's Cup competition. The final was played at National Stadium in Tokyo on January 1, 1980. Fujita Industries won the championship.

== Overview ==
Fujita Industries won their 2nd title, by defeating defending champion Mitsubishi Motors 2–1.

== Match details ==
January 1, 1980

Fujita Industries	2–1	Mitsubishi Motors
? (?) ? (?)		? (?)

National Stadium

Fujita Industries
GK	(Japan) Naoki Kurimoto
DF	(Japan) Tsutomu Sonobe
DF	(Japan) Keizo Imai
MF	(Japan) Mitsuru Komaeda
FW	(Japan) Hara
MF	(Japan) Shigeharu Ueki
MF	(Brazil) Marinho
MF	(Japan) Mitsuo Watanabe
FW	(Japan) Eiji Ueda
FW	(Brazil) Carvalho
FW	(Japan) Yuichi Kotaki
Substitutes:
Manager:
(Japan) Yoshinobu Ishii

Mitsubishi Motors
GK	1	(Japan) Mitsuhisa Taguchi
DF	13	(Japan) Yosuke Naito
DF	5	(Japan) Hiroshi Ochiai
DF	3	(Japan) Kazuo Saito
DF	6	(Japan) Hisao Suzuki
MF	'12	(Japan) Noboru Nagao
MF	7	(Japan) Ikuo Takahara
MF	'11	(Japan) Mitsunori Fujiguchi
FW	10	(Japan) Hisao Sekiguchi	Substituted off
FW	14	(Japan) Kazuo Ozaki
Substitutes:
MF	7	(Japan) Kazumi Takada	Substituted on
Manager:
(Japan) Kenzo Yokoyama

== See also ==
- 1979 Emperor's Cup
