= Mitsuo Kato =

Japanese footballer

Mitsuo Kato 加藤 光雄
Personal information
- Full name: Mitsuo Kato
- Date of birth: 22 January 1953 (age 73)
- Place of birth: Japan
- Position: Midfielder

Youth career
- 1969–1971: Senyo High School
- 1972–1975: Kwansei Gakuin University

Senior career*
Years	Team	Apps	(Gls)
1976–1983	Mitsubishi Motors	61	(7)
Total		61	(7)

International career
1979	Japan	1	(0)
Medal record
Mitsubishi Motors
Winner	Japan Soccer League	1978
Winner	Japan Soccer League	1982
Runner-up	Japan Soccer League	1976
Runner-up	Japan Soccer League	1977
Winner	JSL Cup	1978
Winner	JSL Cup	1981
Winner	Emperor's Cup	1978
Winner	Emperor's Cup	1980
Runner-up	Emperor's Cup	1979
- * Club domestic league appearances and goals

Mitsuo Kato (加藤 光雄, Katō Mitsuo; born 22 January 1953) is a Japanese former professional football player.

== Club career ==
Kato was born on 22 January 1953. After graduating from Kwansei Gakuin University, he joined Mitsubishi Motors in 1976. In 1978, the club won all three major title in Japan: the Japan Soccer League, the JSL Cup, and the Emperor's Cup. The club also won the 1980 Emperor's Cup, the 1981 JSL Cup, the and 1982 Japan Soccer League. He retired in 1983. He played 61 games and scored 7 goals in the league.

== National team career ==
On 23 August 1979, Kato debuted for Japan national team against North Korea.

== Club statistics ==
Club performance			League	
Season	Club	League	Apps	Goals
Japan			League	
1976	Mitsubishi Motors	JSL Division 1	0	0
1977	Mitsubishi Motors	JSL Division 1	18	4
1978	Mitsubishi Motors	JSL Division 1	17	3
1979	Mitsubishi Motors	JSL Division 1	9	0
1980	Mitsubishi Motors	JSL Division 1	8	0
1981	Mitsubishi Motors	JSL Division 1	4	0
1982	Mitsubishi Motors	JSL Division 1	5	0
1983	Mitsubishi Motors	JSL Division 1	7	0
Total			61	7

== National team statistics ==
Japan national team
Year	Apps	Goals
1979	1	0
Total	1	0
