= Yasuyuki Kishino =

Japanese footballer and manager

Yasuyuki Kishino 岸野 靖之
Personal information
- Full name: Yasuyuki Kishino
- Date of birth: June 13, 1958 (age 68)
- Place of birth: Shingu, Wakayama, Japan
- Height: 1.83 m (6 ft 0 in)
- Position: Defender

Youth career
- 1974–1976: Shingu Commercial High School

Senior career*
Years	Team	Apps	(Gls)
1977–1980	Mitsubishi Motors	0	(0)
1982–1990	Yomiuri	58	(3)
Total		58	(3)

Managerial career
- 1996: Verdy Kawasaki
- 2007–2009: Sagan Tosu
- 2010–2012: Yokohama FC
- 2015: Kataller Toyama
Medal record
Mitsubishi Motors
Winner	Japan Soccer League	1978
Runner-up	Japan Soccer League	1977
Winner	JSL Cup	1978
Winner	Emperor's Cup	1978
Winner	Emperor's Cup	1980
Runner-up	Emperor's Cup	1979
Yomiuri
Winner	Japan Soccer League	1983
Winner	Japan Soccer League	1984
Winner	Japan Soccer League	1986/87
Runner-up	Japan Soccer League	1989/90
Winner	JSL Cup	1985
Winner	Emperor's Cup	1984
Winner	Emperor's Cup	1986
Winner	Emperor's Cup	1987
- * Club domestic league appearances and goals

Yasuyuki Kishino (岸野 靖之, Kishino Yasuyuki; born June 13, 1958) is a former Japanese football player and manager.

== Playing career ==
Kishino was born in Shingu on June 13, 1958. After graduating from high school, he joined Mitsubishi Motors in 1977. He could not play in the game and he left in 1980. In 1982, he joined Yomiuri (later Verdy Kawasaki, Tokyo Verdy). He retired in 1990.

== Coaching career ==
After retirement, Kishino started coaching career at Yomiuri in 1991. He coached top team and youth team as assistant coach until 2004. In 2005, he moved to Sagan Tosu and became an assistant coach. In 2007, he was promoted to manager and managed until 2009. In 2010, he signed with Yokohama FC. In March 2012, he was sacked. In 2015, he signed with Kataller Toyama, but in August, he was sacked.

== Club statistics ==
Club performance			League		Cup		League Cup		Total	
Season	Club	League	Apps	Goals	Apps	Goals	Apps	Goals	Apps	Goals
Japan			League		Emperor's Cup		J.League Cup		Total	
1977	Mitsubishi Motors	JSL Division 1	0	0	0	0	0	0	0	0
1978	Mitsubishi Motors	JSL Division 1	0	0	0	0	0	0	0	0
1979	Mitsubishi Motors	JSL Division 1	0	0	0	0	0	0	0	0
1980	Mitsubishi Motors	JSL Division 1	0	0	0	0	0	0	0	0
1982	Yomiuri	JSL Division 1	10	2	0	0	0	0	10	2
1983	Yomiuri	JSL Division 1	0	0	0	0	0	0	0	0
1984	Yomiuri	JSL Division 1	10	0	4	0	0	0	14	0
1985/86	Yomiuri	JSL Division 1	11	1	0	0	3	0	14	1
1986/87	Yomiuri	JSL Division 1	15	0	1	0	1	0	17	0
1987/88	Yomiuri	JSL Division 1	3	0	4	0	0	0	7	0
1988/89	Yomiuri	JSL Division 1	6	0	0	0	0	0	6	0
1989/90	Yomiuri	JSL Division 1	3	0	1	0	0	0	4	0
Total			58	3	10	0	4	0	72	3

== Managerial statistics ==
Team	From	To	Record				
Team	From	To	G	W	D	L	Win %
Verdy Kawasaki	1996	1996	3	1	0	2	33.33
Sagan Tosu	2007	2009	141	65	29	47	46.10
Yokohama FC	2010	2012	78	27	16	35	34.62
Kataller Toyama	2015	2015	24	9	6	9	37.50
Total			246	102	51	93	41.46
