= Mitsuo Watanabe =

Japanese footballer

Mitsuo Watanabe 渡辺 三男
Personal information
- Full name: Mitsuo Watanabe
- Date of birth: June 4, 1953 (age 73)
- Place of birth: Nasu, Tochigi, Japan
- Height: 1.69 m (5 ft 6 1/2 in)
- Positions: Midfielder; forward

Youth career
- 1969–1971: Nasu High School

Senior career*
Years	Team	Apps	(Gls)
1972–1983	Fujita Industries	201	(34)
Total		201	(34)

International career
1974–1979	Japan	28	(4)
Medal record
Fujita Industries
Winner	Japan Soccer League	1977
Winner	Japan Soccer League	1979
Winner	Japan Soccer League	1981
Runner-up	Japan Soccer League	1980
Runner-up	JSL Cup	1978
Winner	Emperor's Cup	1977
Winner	Emperor's Cup	1979
Runner-up	Emperor's Cup	1975
Runner-up	Emperor's Cup	1982
Representing Japan
AFC U-19 Championship
Silver medal – second place	1973 Iran
- * Club domestic league appearances and goals

Mitsuo Watanabe (渡辺 三男, Watanabe Mitsuo; born June 4, 1953) is a former Japanese football player. He played for the Japan national team.

== Club career ==
Watanabe was born in Nasu, Tochigi on June 4, 1953. After graduating from high school, he joined his local club Towa Real Estate in 1972. The club moved to Tokyo and was changed to "Fujita Industries". The club won the league champions in 1977, 1979 and 1981. The club also won 1977 and 1979 Emperor's Cup. He retired in 1983. He played 201 games and scored 34 goals in the league.

== National team career ==
On February 12, 1974, Watanabe debuted for Japan national team against Singapore. In September, he was selected Japan for 1974 Asian Games. He also played at 1976 Summer Olympics qualification. He played 28 games and scored 4 goals for Japan until 1979.

== Club statistics ==
Club performance			League	
Season	Club	League	Apps	Goals
Japan			League	
1972	Towa Real Estate	JSL Division 1	8	0
1973	Towa Real Estate	JSL Division 1	18	6
1974	Towa Real Estate	JSL Division 1	18	8
1975	Fujita Industries	JSL Division 1	18	4
1976	Fujita Industries	JSL Division 1	18	6
1977	Fujita Industries	JSL Division 1	17	4
1978	Fujita Industries	JSL Division 1	18	0
1979	Fujita Industries	JSL Division 1	18	3
1980	Fujita Industries	JSL Division 1	18	3
1981	Fujita Industries	JSL Division 1	18	0
1982	Fujita Industries	JSL Division 1	18	0
1983	Fujita Industries	JSL Division 1	14	0
Total			201	34

== National team statistics ==
Japan national team
Year	Apps	Goals
1974	7	1
1975	12	3
1976	3	0
1977	0	0
1978	0	0
1979	6	0
Total	28	4
