= Shigeharu Ueki =

Japanese football player and manager (1954–2024)

Shigeharu Ueki 植木 繁晴
Personal information
- Date of birth: September 13, 1954
- Place of birth: Kawasaki, Kanagawa, Japan
- Date of death: April 11, 2024 (aged 69)
- Place of death: Maebashi
- Position: Forward

Youth career
- 1970–1972: Shinjo High School

College career
Years	Team	Apps	(Gls)
1973–1976	Nihon University		

Senior career*
Years	Team	Apps	(Gls)
1977–1988	Fujita Industries	144	(16)
Total		144	(16)

International career
1979	Japan	1	(0)

Managerial career
- 1995: Bellmare Hiratsuka
- 1996–1998: Bellmare Hiratsuka
- 1999–2000: Montedio Yamagata
- 2004: Thespa Kusatsu
- 2006–2008: Thespa Kusatsu
Medal record
Fujita Industries
Winner	Japan Soccer League	1977
Winner	Japan Soccer League	1979
Winner	Japan Soccer League	1981
Runner-up	Japan Soccer League	1980
Runner-up	JSL Cup	1978
Winner	Emperor's Cup	1977
Winner	Emperor's Cup	1979
Runner-up	Emperor's Cup	1982
Runner-up	Emperor's Cup	1985
- * Club domestic league appearances and goals

Shigeharu Ueki (植木 繁晴, Ueki Shigeharu; September 13, 1954 – April 11, 2024) was a Japanese football player and manager. He played once for the Japan national team.

== Club career ==
Ueki was born in Kawasaki on September 13, 1954. After graduating from Nihon University, he joined Fujita Industries in 1977. The club won the league champions in 1977, 1979 and 1981. The club also won 1977 and 1979 Emperor's Cup. He retired in 1988. He played 144 games and scored 16 goals in the league.

== International career ==
On July 13, 1979, Ueki debuted for Japan national team against Singapore and Japan won the match.

== Coaching career ==
After retirement, Ueki started his coaching career at Fujita Industries (later Bellmare Hiratsuka). In November 1995, he became a manager as Mitsuru Komaeda's successor and managed at the 1995 Emperor's Cup and the 1995 Asian Cup Winners' Cup. The club won the championship at the Asian Cup Winners' Cup. In September 1996, he became a manager again as Toninho Moura's successor and managed until 1998. In 1999, he moved to the J2 League club Montedio Yamagata and managed until 2000. In 2002, he moved to the Japan Football League club Thespa Kusatsu. In 2004, he managed 1 season and promoted the club to the J2 League. In 2006, he became a manager again and managed until 2008.

== Death ==
Ueki died in Maebashi on April 11, 2024, at the age of 69.

== Managerial statistics ==
Team	From	To	Record				
Team	From	To	G	W	D	L	Win %
Bellmare Hiratsuka	1996	1998	77	38	0	39	49.35
Montedio Yamagata	1999	2000	76	26	6	44	34.21
Thespa Kusatsu	2006	2008	138	29	50	59	21.01
Total			291	93	56	142	31.96
