= 1978 in Japanese football =

1978 season

Japanese football in 1978

== Japan Soccer League ==
=== Division 1 ===
Pos	Team	Pld	W	PKW	PKL	L	GF	GA	GD	Pts	Qualification
1	Mitsubishi Motors	18	13	1	0	4	30	13	+17	54	Champions
2	Yanmar Diesel	18	11	1	1	5	33	26	+7	47	
3	Fujita	18	9	3	4	2	35	14	+21	46	
4	Yomiuri	18	10	1	1	6	40	30	+10	43	
5	Hitachi	18	8	1	0	9	36	30	+6	34	
6	Toyo Industries	18	7	3	0	8	23	34	−11	34	
7	Nippon Kokan	18	7	0	2	9	19	21	−2	30	
8	Nippon Steel	18	5	2	2	9	16	18	−2	26	
9	Fujitsu	18	3	1	3	11	14	29	−15	17	To promotion/relegation Series
10	Furukawa Electric	18	3	1	1	13	9	30	−21	15	To promotion/relegation Series

=== Division 2 ===
Pos	Team	Pld	W	PKW	PKL	L	GF	GA	GD	Pts	Qualification
1	Honda	18	13	1	3	1	39	9	+30	57	To promotion/relegation Series with Division 1
2	Nissan Motors	18	10	2	2	4	36	16	+20	46	To promotion/relegation Series with Division 1
3	Kofu Club	18	9	1	0	8	32	33	−1	38	
4	Yanmar Club (Yanmar Diesel B-Team)	18	8	3	0	7	29	31	−2	38	
5	Tanabe Pharmaceutical	18	7	3	3	5	23	16	+7	37	
6	Teijin	18	7	2	2	7	25	22	+3	34	
7	Toshiba Horikawacho	18	7	2	2	7	20	20	0	34	
8	Sumitomo Metal	18	7	0	2	9	29	28	+1	30	
9	Toyota Motors	18	5	1	0	12	26	42	−16	22	To promotion/relegation Series with Regional Series finalists
10	Kyoto Shiko Club	18	1	1	2	14	15	51	−36	8	To promotion/relegation Series with Regional Series finalists

== Emperor's Cup ==
January 1, 1979

Mitsubishi Motors	1–0	Toyo Industries
Ikuo Takahara (?)

National Stadium

== National team ==
=== Results ===
1978.05.23	Japan	3–1	Thailand	Aichi, Japan
	Nagai 4'; Usui 23'; Ochiai 69'	JFA	? (?)	Stadium: Mizuho Rugby Stadium

1978.07.13	Japan	0–0	Iraq	Kuala Lumpur, Malaysia
		JFA

1978.07.15	Japan	1–2	Indonesia	Kuala Lumpur, Malaysia
	Fujishima 25'	JFA	? (?) ? (?)

1978.07.17	Japan	3–2	Syria	Kuala Lumpur, Malaysia
	Usui 3', 8'; Ochiai 44'	JFA	? (?) ? (?)

1978.07.19	Japan	0–4	South Korea	Kuala Lumpur, Malaysia
		JFA	? (?) ? (?) ? (?) ? (?)

1978.07.21	Japan	1–4	Malaysia	Kuala Lumpur, Malaysia
	Nishino 8'	JFA	? (?) ? (?)

1978.07.23	Japan	1–2	Singapore	Kuala Lumpur, Malaysia
	Usui 44'	JFA	? (?) ? (?)

1978.07.26	Japan	4–0	Thailand	Kuala Lumpur, Malaysia
	Hosotani 7'; Ochiai 40'; Usui 86'; Sekiguchi 87'	JFA

1978.11.19	Japan	1–4	Soviet Union	Tokyo, Japan
	Fujiguchi 4'	JFA	? (?) ? (?) ? (?) ? (?)	Stadium: Tokyo National Stadium

1978.11.23	Japan	1–4	Soviet Union	Tokyo, Japan
	Fujiguchi 86'	JFA	? (?) ? (?) ? (?) ? (?)	Stadium: Tokyo National Stadium

1978.11.26	Japan	0–3	Soviet Union	Osaka, Japan
		JFA	? (?) ? (?) ? (?)	Stadium: Osaka Nagai Stadium

1978.12.11	Japan	0–2	Kuwait	Bangkok, Thailand
		JFA	? (?) ? (?)

1978.12.13	Japan	4–0	Bahrain	Bangkok, Thailand
	Usui 8', 42'; Hara 65'; Maeda 71'	JFA

1978.12.15	Japan	1–3	South Korea	Bangkok, Thailand
	Kato 87'	JFA	? (?) ? (?) ? (?)

=== Players statistics ===
Player	-1977	05.23	07.13	07.15	07.17	07.19	07.21	07.23	07.26	11.19	11.23	11.26	12.11	12.13	12.15	1978	Total
Nobuo Fujishima	50(6)	O	O	O(1)	O	O	-	-	O	O	O	O	O	O	O	12(1)	62(7)
Yoshikazu Nagai	46(5)	O(1)	O	O	O	O	O	O	O	-	-	O	O	O	O	12(1)	58(6)
Hiroshi Ochiai	35(5)	O(1)	O	O	O(1)	O	O	O	O(1)	O	O	O	O	O	O	14(3)	49(8)
Atsuyoshi Furuta	26(0)	-	-	-	-	-	-	-	-	O	O	O	O	O	O	6(0)	32(0)
Kazuo Saito	19(0)	O	O	O	O	O	O	O	O	-	-	-	-	-	O	9(0)	28(0)
Hideki Maeda	14(2)	-	-	-	O	O	O	O	O	-	-	-	O	O(1)	-	7(1)	21(3)
Mitsunori Fujiguchi	14(0)	O	O	O	-	O	O	O	-	O(1)	O(1)	O	O	O	O	12(2)	26(2)
Mitsuhisa Taguchi	9(0)	O	O	O	O	O	-	O	O	O	O	O	O	O	O	13(0)	22(0)
Hiroyuki Usui	7(0)	O(1)	O	O	O(2)	O	O	O(1)	O(1)	O	O	O	O	O(2)	O	14(7)	21(7)
Akira Nishino	4(0)	O	O	O	O	O	O(1)	O	O	-	-	-	-	-	-	8(1)	12(1)
Keizo Imai	3(0)	O	O	O	O	O	O	O	O	O	-	O	O	O	O	13(0)	16(0)
Nobutoshi Kaneda	1(1)	O	O	O	O	O	O	O	O	O	O	O	O	O	O	14(0)	15(1)
Hiromi Hara	0(0)	-	-	-	-	-	-	-	-	O	O	O	O	O(1)	O	6(1)	6(1)
Kazuaki Nagasawa	0(0)	-	O	O	O	O	-	O	O	-	-	-	-	-	-	6(0)	6(0)
Hisashi Kato	0(0)	-	-	-	-	-	-	-	-	-	O	O	O	O	O(1)	5(1)	5(1)
Ichiro Hosotani	0(0)	-	O	O	-	-	O	-	O(1)	-	-	-	-	-	-	4(1)	4(1)
Tsutomu Sonobe	0(0)	O	-	-	-	-	-	-	-	O	O	O	-	-	-	4(0)	4(0)
Haruhisa Hasegawa	0(0)	-	-	-	-	-	-	-	-	O	O	O	O	-	-	4(0)	4(0)
Hisao Sekiguchi	0(0)	O	-	-	-	-	O	-	O(1)	-	-	-	-	-	-	3(1)	3(1)
Toyohito Mochizuki	0(0)	-	-	-	-	-	O	O	-	-	-	-	-	-	-	2(0)	2(0)
Yukitaka Omi	0(0)	O	-	-	-	-	-	-	-	-	-	-	-	-	-	1(0)	1(0)
Choei Sato	0(0)	-	-	-	-	-	O	-	-	-	-	-	-	-	-	1(0)	1(0)
Tetsuo Sugamata	0(0)	-	-	-	-	-	-	O	-	-	-	-	-	-	-	1(0)	1(0)

== Births ==
- 25 February: Yuji Nakazawa
