= Mitsunori Fujiguchi =

Japanese footballer (born 1949)

Mitsunori Fujiguchi 藤口 光紀
Personal information
- Full name: Mitsunori Fujiguchi
- Date of birth: August 17, 1949 (age 77)
- Place of birth: Maebashi, Gunma, Japan
- Height: 1.75 m (5 ft 9 in)
- Position: Midfielder

Youth career
- 1965–1967: Niijima Gakuen High School

College career
Years	Team	Apps	(Gls)
1969–1973	Keio University		

Senior career*
Years	Team	Apps	(Gls)
1974–1982	Mitsubishi Motors	127	(27)
Total		127	(27)

International career
1972–1978	Japan	26	(2)
Medal record
Mitsubishi Motors
Winner	Japan Soccer League	1978
Winner	Japan Soccer League	1982
Runner-up	Japan Soccer League	1974
Runner-up	Japan Soccer League	1975
Runner-up	Japan Soccer League	1976
Runner-up	Japan Soccer League	1977
Winner	JSL Cup	1978
Winner	JSL Cup	1981
Winner	Emperor's Cup	1978
Winner	Emperor's Cup	1980
Runner-up	Emperor's Cup	1979
- * Club domestic league appearances and goals

Mitsunori Fujiguchi (藤口 光紀, Fujiguchi Mitsunori; born August 17, 1949) is a former Japanese football player. He played for Japan national team.

== Club career ==
Fujiguchi was born in Maebashi on August 17, 1949. After graduating from Keio University, he joined Mitsubishi Motors in 1974. From first season, the club won the 2nd place for 4 years in a row until 1977. In 1978, the club won all three major title in Japan; Japan Soccer League, JSL Cup and Emperor's Cup. The club also won 1980 Emperor's Cup, 1981 JSL Cup and 1982 Japan Soccer League. He retired in 1982. He played 127 games and scored 27 goals in the league. He was selected Best Eleven 3 times (1974, 1975 and 1978).

== National team career ==
On July 12, 1972, when Fujiguchi was a Keio University student, he debuted for the Japan national team against Cambodia. He played at the 1974 World Cup qualification and the 1976 Asian Cup qualification. In 1978, he was also selected to play for Japan at the 1978 Asian Games and he played three games. That competition was his last game for Japan. He played 26 games and scored 2 goals for Japan until 1978.

== Career statistics ==
=== Club ===
Club performance			League	
Season	Club	League	Apps	Goals
Japan			League	
1974	Mitsubishi Motors	JSL Division 1	15	7
1975	Mitsubishi Motors	JSL Division 1	18	3
1976	Mitsubishi Motors	JSL Division 1	16	2
1977	Mitsubishi Motors	JSL Division 1	14	4
1978	Mitsubishi Motors	JSL Division 1	18	3
1979	Mitsubishi Motors	JSL Division 1	18	3
1980	Mitsubishi Motors	JSL Division 1	18	5
1981	Mitsubishi Motors	JSL Division 1	10	0
1982	Mitsubishi Motors	JSL Division 1	0	0
Total			127	27

=== International ===
Appearances and goals by national team and year
National team	Year	Apps	Goals
Japan	1972	5	0
Japan	1973	2	0
Japan	1974	1	0
Japan	1975	4	0
Japan	1976	2	0
Japan	1977	0	0
Japan	1978	12	2
Total		26	2

Scores and results list Japan's goal tally first, score column indicates score after each Fujiguchi goal.

List of international goals scored by Mitsunori Fujiguchi
No.	Date	Venue	Opponent	Score	Result	Competition
1	19 November 1978	Komazawa Olympic Park Stadium, Tokyo, Japan	Soviet Union	1–0	1–4	Friendly
2	23 November 1978	Komazawa Olympic Park Stadium, Tokyo, Japan	Soviet Union	1–4	1–4	Friendly
