= Hisao Sekiguchi =

Japanese footballer

Hisao Sekiguchi 関口 久雄
Personal information
- Full name: Hisao Sekiguchi
- Date of birth: October 29, 1954 (age 72)
- Place of birth: Saitama, Saitama, Japan
- Height: 1.76 m (5 ft 9 1/2 in)
- Position: Forward

Youth career
- 1970–1972: Urawa Minami High School

Senior career*
Years	Team	Apps	(Gls)
1973–1988	Mitsubishi Motors	153	(36)
Total		153	(36)

International career
1978	Japan	3	(1)
Medal record
Mitsubishi Motors
Winner	Japan Soccer League	1973
Winner	Japan Soccer League	1978
Winner	Japan Soccer League	1982
Runner-up	Japan Soccer League	1974
Runner-up	Japan Soccer League	1975
Runner-up	Japan Soccer League	1976
Runner-up	Japan Soccer League	1977
Winner	JSL Cup	1978
Winner	JSL Cup	1981
Winner	Emperor's Cup	1973
Winner	Emperor's Cup	1978
Winner	Emperor's Cup	1980
Runner-up	Emperor's Cup	1979
- * Club domestic league appearances and goals

Hisao Sekiguchi (関口 久雄, Sekiguchi Hisao; born October 29, 1954) is a former Japanese football player. He played for Japan national team.

== Club career ==
Sekiguchi was born in Saitama on October 29, 1954. After graduating from high school, he joined his local club Mitsubishi Motors in 1973. In 1973, the club won the champions Japan Soccer League and Emperor's Cup. In 1978, the club won all three major title in Japan; Japan Soccer League, JSL Cup and Emperor's Cup. In 1980s, the club also won 1980 Emperor's Cup, 1981 JSL Cup and 1982 Japan Soccer League. He retired in 1988. He played 153 games and scored 36 goals in the league.

== National team career ==
On May 23, 1978, Sekiguchi debuted for Japan national team against Thailand. In July, he also played for Japan. He played 3 games and scored 1 goal for Japan in 1978.

== Club statistics ==
Club performance			League	
Season	Club	League	Apps	Goals
Japan			League	
1973	Mitsubishi Motors	JSL Division 1	0	0
1974	Mitsubishi Motors	JSL Division 1	1	0
1975	Mitsubishi Motors	JSL Division 1	2	0
1976	Mitsubishi Motors	JSL Division 1	15	8
1977	Mitsubishi Motors	JSL Division 1	16	5
1978	Mitsubishi Motors	JSL Division 1	18	4
1979	Mitsubishi Motors	JSL Division 1	16	3
1980	Mitsubishi Motors	JSL Division 1	13	5
1981	Mitsubishi Motors	JSL Division 1	11	4
1982	Mitsubishi Motors	JSL Division 1	12	2
1983	Mitsubishi Motors	JSL Division 1	9	1
1984	Mitsubishi Motors	JSL Division 1	13	3
1985/86	Mitsubishi Motors	JSL Division 1	6	0
1986/87	Mitsubishi Motors	JSL Division 1	13	1
1987/88	Mitsubishi Motors	JSL Division 1	8	0
Total			153	36

== National team statistics ==
Japan national team
Year	Apps	Goals
1978	3	1
Total	3	1
