= Ikuo Takahara =

Japanese footballer

Ikuo Takahara 高原 郁夫
Personal information
- Full name: Ikuo Takahara
- Date of birth: October 14, 1957 (age 69)
- Place of birth: Japan
- Height: 1.72 m (5 ft 7 1/2 in)
- Position: Forward

Youth career
- 1973–1975: Ueda Higashi High School

Senior career*
Years	Team	Apps	(Gls)
1976–1981	Mitsubishi Motors	64	(15)
Total		64	(15)

International career
1980	Japan	4	(2)
Medal record
Mitsubishi Motors
Winner	Japan Soccer League	1978
Runner-up	Japan Soccer League	1976
Runner-up	Japan Soccer League	1977
Winner	JSL Cup	1978
Winner	JSL Cup	1981
Winner	Emperor's Cup	1978
Winner	Emperor's Cup	1980
Runner-up	Emperor's Cup	1979
- * Club domestic league appearances and goals

Ikuo Takahara (高原 郁夫, Takahara Ikuo; born October 14, 1957) is a former Japanese football player. He played for Japan national team.

== Club career ==
Takahara was born on October 14, 1957. After graduating from high school, he joined Mitsubishi Motors in 1976. In 1978, the club won all three major title in Japan; Japan Soccer League, JSL Cup and Emperor's Cup. The club also won 1980 Emperor's Cup and 1981 JSL Cup. He retired in 1981. He played 64 games and scored 15 goals in the league.

== National team career ==
In March 1980, Takahara was selected Japan national team for 1980 Summer Olympics qualification. At this qualification, on March 22, he debuted and scored a goal against South Korea. He played 4 games and scored 2 goals for Japan in 1980.

== Club statistics ==
Club performance			League	
Season	Club	League	Apps	Goals
Japan			League	
1976	Mitsubishi Motors	JSL Division 1	0	0
1977	Mitsubishi Motors	JSL Division 1	2	1
1978	Mitsubishi Motors	JSL Division 1	10	3
1979	Mitsubishi Motors	JSL Division 1	17	4
1980	Mitsubishi Motors	JSL Division 1	18	3
1981	Mitsubishi Motors	JSL Division 1	17	4
Total			64	15

== National team statistics ==
Japan national team
Year	Apps	Goals
1980	4	2
Total	4	2
