= 1981 in Japanese football =

1981 season

Japanese football in 1981

== Japan Soccer League ==
=== Division 1 ===
Pos	Team	Pld	W	D	L	GF	GA	GD	Pts	Qualification or relegation
1	Fujita Engineering	18	11	5	2	24	7	+17	27	Champions
2	Yomiuri	18	8	9	1	32	16	+16	25	
3	Mitsubishi Motors	18	10	4	4	24	16	+8	24	
4	Yanmar Diesel	18	7	8	3	21	15	+6	22	
5	Furukawa Electric	18	7	7	4	28	23	+5	21	
6	Honda	18	5	4	9	23	28	−5	14	
7	Hitachi	18	5	3	10	22	27	−5	13	
8	Mazda	18	4	5	9	15	27	−12	13	
9	Nippon Steel	18	3	5	10	14	27	−13	11	To promotion/relegation series
10	Yamaha Motors	18	2	6	10	11	28	−17	10	Relegated to Second Division

=== Division 2 ===
Pos	Team	Pld	W	D	L	GF	GA	GD	Pts	Promotion or relegation
1	Nippon Kokan	18	11	4	3	42	22	+20	26	Promoted to First Division
2	Nissan	18	11	4	3	31	16	+15	26	To promotion/relegation series with First Division
3	Toshiba	18	12	1	5	46	21	+25	25	
4	Tanabe Pharmaceuticals	18	9	4	5	35	11	+24	22	
5	Fujitsu	18	10	1	7	31	27	+4	21	
6	Toyota Motors	18	6	4	8	33	30	+3	16	
7	Sumitomo	18	7	1	10	32	31	+1	15	
8	Teijin Matsuyama	18	5	4	9	23	34	−11	14	
9	Kofu Club	18	4	2	12	18	42	−24	10	To promotion/relegation series with Regional Series
10	Nagoya S.C.	18	2	1	15	16	72	−56	5	Relegated to Regional Leagues

== Emperor's Cup ==
January 1, 1982

Nippon Kokan	2–0	Yomiuri
Toshio Matsuura (?)

National Stadium

== National team (Men) ==
=== Results ===
1981.02.08	Japan	0–1	Malaysia	Kuantan, Malaysia
		JFA	? (?)

1981.02.10	Japan	1–1	Malaysia	Kuala Lumpur, Malaysia
	62' (o.g.)	JFA	? (?)

1981.02.17	Japan	1–0	Singapore	Singapore
	Yoshida 79'	JFA

1981.02.19	Japan	0–0	Singapore	Singapore
		JFA

1981.02.24	Japan	0–2	Indonesia	Jakarta, Indonesia
		JFA	? (?) ? (?)

1981.03.08	Japan	0–1	South Korea	Tokyo, Japan
		JFA	? (?)	Stadium: Tokyo National Stadium

1981.06.02	Japan	0–0	China PR	Saitama, Japan
		JFA		Stadium: Omiya Football Stadium

1981.06.19	Japan	2–0	Malaysia	Daegu, South Korea
	Yokoyama 22', 52'	JFA

1981.06.21	Japan	0–2	South Korea	Busan, South Korea
		JFA	? (?) ? (?)

1981.08.30	Japan	2–0	Malaysia	Kuala Lumpur, Malaysia
	Yokoyama 6', 29'	JFA

1981.09.03	Japan	3–2	India	Kuala Lumpur, Malaysia
	M. Kato 32'; Yokoyama 35', 62'	JFA	? (?) ? (?)

1981.09.08	Japan	3–2	United Arab Emirates	Kuala Lumpur, Malaysia
	H. Kato 18'; Hara 22'; Ozaki 58'	JFA	? (?) ? (?)

1981.09.14	Japan	2–0	Indonesia	Kuala Lumpur, Malaysia
	Matsuura 58'; Ozaki 60'	JFA

1981.09.18	Japan	0–2	Iraq	Kuala Lumpur, Malaysia
		JFA	? (?) ? (?)

=== Players statistics ===
Player	-1980	02.08	02.10	02.17	02.19	02.24	03.08	06.02	06.19	06.21	08.30	09.03	09.08	09.14	09.18	1981	Total
Hideki Maeda	41(9)	O	O	O	O	O	O	-	-	-	O	O	O	O	O	11(0)	52(9)
Mitsuhisa Taguchi	34(0)	-	-	-	-	-	-	-	-	O	O	-	-	O	O	4(0)	38(0)
Nobutoshi Kaneda	30(3)	O	O	O	-	O	O	O	-	-	-	-	-	-	-	6(0)	36(3)
Haruhisa Hasegawa	14(4)	-	-	-	-	-	O	-	-	-	-	-	-	-	-	1(0)	15(4)
Hiromi Hara	13(3)	O	-	O	O	O	O	-	-	-	O	O	O(1)	O	O	10(1)	23(4)
Masafumi Yokoyama	13(2)	-	O	O	O	-	-	-	O(2)	O	O(2)	O(2)	O	-	O	9(6)	22(8)
Kazushi Kimura	12(4)	-	-	-	-	-	O	-	-	-	-	-	-	-	-	1(0)	13(4)
Shigemitsu Sudo	9(0)	-	O	O	-	O	O	-	-	-	-	-	-	-	-	4(0)	13(0)
Hisashi Kato	8(1)	-	-	-	-	-	O	O	O	O	O	-	O(1)	O	O	8(1)	16(2)
Tetsuo Sugamata	8(0)	O	-	-	O	-	-	O	-	-	-	-	-	-	-	3(0)	11(0)
Shinji Tanaka	4(0)	O	O	O	-	O	O	O	O	O	-	-	-	-	-	8(0)	12(0)
Tetsuya Totsuka	4(0)	O	O	O	-	O	O	O	O	O	-	-	-	-	-	8(0)	12(0)
Yahiro Kazama	4(0)	-	-	-	-	-	O	O	O	O	-	O	O	O	O	8(0)	12(0)
Tsutomu Sonobe	4(0)	O	-	-	O	O	-	-	-	-	-	-	-	-	-	3(0)	7(0)
Satoshi Tsunami	3(0)	-	-	-	-	-	-	-	O	O	O	O	O	O	O	7(0)	10(0)
Yoshio Kato	3(0)	O	O	O	O	O	-	-	-	-	-	-	-	-	-	5(0)	8(0)
Takeshi Okada	3(0)	-	O	O	O	O	O	-	-	-	-	-	-	-	-	5(0)	8(0)
Satoshi Tezuka	2(0)	O	-	-	O	O	-	O	O	O	-	-	-	-	-	6(0)	8(0)
Masakuni Yamamoto	2(0)	-	O	-	O	-	-	-	-	-	-	-	-	-	-	2(0)	4(0)
Akihiro Nishimura	1(0)	O	O	O	O	O	O	O	O	O	O	O	O	-	O	13(0)	14(0)
Takeshi Koshida	1(0)	-	-	-	-	-	-	-	-	-	-	-	-	O	-	1(0)	2(0)
Ryoichi Kawakatsu	0(0)	O	-	O	O	-	-	-	O	O	O	O	O	O	O	10(0)	10(0)
Kazuo Ozaki	0(0)	O	O	O	O	-	-	-	-	-	O	O	O(1)	O(1)	O	9(2)	9(2)
Koichi Hashiratani	0(0)	O	O	O	O	O	-	O	O	O	-	-	-	-	O	9(0)	9(0)
Mitsugu Nomura	0(0)	-	-	-	-	-	-	O	O	O	O	O	O	O	O	8(0)	8(0)
Hiroshi Yoshida	0(0)	O	O	O(1)	O	O	O	-	-	-	-	-	-	-	-	6(1)	6(1)
Kazumi Tsubota	0(0)	-	-	-	-	-	O	O	O	-	-	O	O	-	-	5(0)	5(0)
Toshio Matsuura	0(0)	-	-	-	-	-	-	O	-	O	-	O	-	O(1)	-	4(1)	4(1)
Masaaki Kato	0(0)	-	-	-	-	-	-	-	-	-	O	O(1)	O	-	-	3(1)	3(1)
Toshihiko Okimune	0(0)	-	-	-	-	-	-	-	-	-	O	O	-	-	-	2(0)	2(0)
Satoshi Yamaguchi	0(0)	-	-	-	O	-	-	-	-	-	-	-	-	-	-	1(0)	1(0)
Naoji Ito	0(0)	-	-	-	-	-	-	-	O	-	-	-	-	-	-	1(0)	1(0)

== National team (Women) ==
=== Results ===
1981.06.07	Japan	0–1	Chinese Taipei	Hong Kong
			? (?)

1981.06.11	Japan	0–2	Thailand	Hong Kong
			? (?) ? (?)

1981.06.13	Japan	1–0	Indonesia	Hong Kong
	Handa (?)

1981.09.06	Japan	0–4	England	Hyōgo, Japan
			? (?) ? (?) ? (?) ? (?)	Stadium: Kobe Central Stadium

1981.09.09	Japan	0–9	Italy	Tokyo, Japan
			? (?) ? (?) ? (?) ? (?) ? (?) ? (?) ? (?) ? (?) ? (?)	Stadium: Nishigaoka Soccer Stadium

=== Players statistics ===
Player	-1980	06.07	06.11	06.13	09.06	09.09	1981	Total
Etsuko Handa	0(0)	O	O	O(1)	O	O	5(1)	5(1)
Midori Honda	0(0)	O	O	O	O	O	5(0)	5(0)
Futaba Kioka	0(0)	O	O	O	O	O	5(0)	5(0)
Miho Kaneda	0(0)	O	O	O	O	O	5(0)	5(0)
Masuyo Shiraishi	0(0)	O	O	O	O	-	4(0)	4(0)
Nobuko Kondo	0(0)	O	O	O	-	O	4(0)	4(0)
Yuriko Shima	0(0)	O	O	O	-	O	4(0)	4(0)
Shiho Kaneda	0(0)	O	-	O	O	O	4(0)	4(0)
Chieko Homma	0(0)	O	O	O	-	-	3(0)	3(0)
Maho Shimizu	0(0)	O	O	-	O	-	3(0)	3(0)
Chieko Hase	0(0)	O	O	-	-	O	3(0)	3(0)
Junko Ishida	0(0)	O	-	O	O	-	3(0)	3(0)
Akemi Iwata	0(0)	-	O	O	-	O	3(0)	3(0)
Sanae Mishima	0(0)	-	O	-	-	O	2(0)	2(0)
Mihoko Iwaya	0(0)	-	-	O	O	-	2(0)	2(0)
Sayuri Yamaguchi	0(0)	-	-	-	O	O	2(0)	2(0)
Nobuko Jashima	0(0)	-	-	-	O	-	1(0)	1(0)
Kaoru Kakinami	0(0)	-	-	-	O	-	1(0)	1(0)
Michiko Matsuda	0(0)	-	-	-	O	-	1(0)	1(0)
Mayumi Kaji	0(0)	-	-	-	O	-	1(0)	1(0)
Emiko Kubo	0(0)	-	-	-	O	-	1(0)	1(0)
Tomoko Ohara	0(0)	-	-	-	-	O	1(0)	1(0)
Masako Yoshida	0(0)	-	-	-	-	O	1(0)	1(0)

== Births ==
- 8 September: Teruyuki Moniwa
