= Kazuo Saito =

Japanese footballer and manager

Kazuo Saito 斉藤 和夫
Personal information
- Full name: Kazuo Saito
- Date of birth: July 27, 1951 (age 75)
- Place of birth: Saitama, Saitama, Japan
- Height: 1.75 m (5 ft 9 in)
- Position: Defender

Youth career
- 1967–1969: Saitama Urawa Minami High School
- 1970–1973: Hosei University

Senior career*
Years	Team	Apps	(Gls)
1974–1989	Mitsubishi Motors	248	(3)
Total		248	(3)

International career
1976–1984	Japan	32	(0)

Managerial career
- 1989–1992: Mitsubishi Motors
- 1997: Kawasaki Frontale
- 2000: Urawa Reds
- 2014: JEF United Chiba
Medal record
Mitsubishi Motors
Winner	Japan Soccer League	1978
Winner	Japan Soccer League	1982
Runner-up	Japan Soccer League	1974
Runner-up	Japan Soccer League	1975
Runner-up	Japan Soccer League	1976
Runner-up	Japan Soccer League	1977
Winner	JSL Cup	1978
Winner	JSL Cup	1981
Winner	Emperor's Cup	1978
Winner	Emperor's Cup	1980
Runner-up	Emperor's Cup	1979
- * Club domestic league appearances and goals

Kazuo Saito (斉藤 和夫, Saitō Kazuo; born July 27, 1951) is a former Japanese football player and manager. He played for Japan national team.

== Club career ==
Saito was born in Saitama on July 27, 1951. After graduating from Hosei University, he joined his local club Mitsubishi Motors in 1974. The club won the 2nd place for 4 years in a row (1974-1977). In 1978, the club won all three major title in Japan; Japan Soccer League, JSL Cup and Emperor's Cup. The club also won 1980 Emperor's Cup, 1981 JSL Cup and 1982 Japan Soccer League. However, in 1988–89 season, the club finished at the bottom place and was relegated Division 2. He retired in 1989. He played 248 games and scored 3 goals in the league. He was selected Best Eleven in 1975, 197 and 1978.

== National team career ==
On January 28, 1976, Saito debuted for Japan national team against Bulgaria. He played as regular player at 1976 Summer Olympics qualification and 1978 World Cup qualification. He was also selected for Japan for 1978 Asian Games. In 1984, he played for Japan for the first time in 6 years. 1984 Summer Olympics qualification was his last game for Japan. He played 32 games for Japan until 1984.

== Coaching career ==
Saito retired from playing career in 1989, he became a manager for Mitsubishi Motors (later Urawa Reds) as Kuniya Daini successor. In 1989–90 season, he led the club to won the champions in Division 2 and promoted to Division 1. He resigned in 1992. Through a coach for Urawa Reds and JEF United Ichihara (later JEF United Chiba), he signed with Kawasaki Frontale in 1997. In 2000, he returned to Urawa Reds and managed the club. From 2010, he signed with JEF United Chiba and became a coach. In 2014, he managed JEF United Chiba as caretaker as Jun Suzuki successor.

== Club statistics ==
Club performance			League	
Season	Club	League	Apps	Goals
Japan			League	
1974	Mitsubishi Motors	JSL Division 1	15	0
1975	Mitsubishi Motors	JSL Division 1	18	0
1976	Mitsubishi Motors	JSL Division 1	17	1
1977	Mitsubishi Motors	JSL Division 1	18	1
1978	Mitsubishi Motors	JSL Division 1	13	0
1979	Mitsubishi Motors	JSL Division 1	14	0
1980	Mitsubishi Motors	JSL Division 1	18	1
1981	Mitsubishi Motors	JSL Division 1	18	0
1982	Mitsubishi Motors	JSL Division 1	18	0
1983	Mitsubishi Motors	JSL Division 1	12	0
1984	Mitsubishi Motors	JSL Division 1	15	0
1985/86	Mitsubishi Motors	JSL Division 1	21	0
1986/87	Mitsubishi Motors	JSL Division 1	19	0
1987/88	Mitsubishi Motors	JSL Division 1	20	0
1988/89	Mitsubishi Motors	JSL Division 1	12	0
Total			248	3

== National team statistics ==
Japan national team
Year	Apps	Goals
1976	14	0
1977	5	0
1978	9	0
1979	0	0
1980	0	0
1981	0	0
1982	0	0
1983	0	0
1984	4	0
Total	32	0

== Managerial statistics ==
Team	From	To	Record				
Team	From	To	G	W	D	L	Win %
Urawa Reds	2000	2000	40	28	3	9	70.00
JEF United Chiba	2014	2014	2	1	0	1	50.00
Total			42	29	3	10	69.05
