= 1978 Emperor's Cup final =

1978 Emperor's Cup Final
Mitsubishi Motors	Toyo Industries
1	0
- Date: January 1, 1979
- Venue: National Stadium, Tokyo

1978 Emperor's Cup Final was the 58th final of the Emperor's Cup competition. The final was played at National Stadium in Tokyo on January 1, 1979. Mitsubishi Motors won the championship.

== Overview ==
Mitsubishi Motors won their 3rd title, by defeating Toyo Industries 1–0. Mitsubishi Motors was featured a squad consisting of Mitsuhisa Taguchi, Kazuo Saito, Hiroshi Ochiai, Mitsunori Fujiguchi, Mitsuo Kato, Kazuo Ozaki and Ikuo Takahara.

== Match details ==
January 1, 1979

Mitsubishi Motors	1–0	Toyo Industries
Ikuo Takahara (?)

National Stadium

Mitsubishi Motors
GK	1	(Japan) Mitsuhisa Taguchi
DF	3	(Japan) Kazuo Saito
DF	5	(Japan) Hiroshi Ochiai
DF	2	(Japan) Satoru Kawashima
DF	6	(Japan) Hisao Suzuki
MF	8	(Japan) Mitsunori Fujiguchi
MF	10	(Japan) Masatoshi Matsunaga
MF	7	(Japan) Noboru Nagao
FW	12	(Japan) Mitsuo Kato
FW	21	(Japan) Kazuo Ozaki
FW	13	(Japan) Ikuo Takahara	Substituted off
Substitutes:
MF	10	(Japan) Hisao Sekiguchi	Substituted on
Manager:
(Japan) Kenzo Yokoyama

Toyo Industries
GK	(Japan) Yohei Ando
DF	(Japan) Tsuyoshi Kotaki
DF	(Japan) Hideo Ohara
DF	(Japan) Haruo Kotaki
DF	(Japan) Nobuo Wamura
MF	(Japan) Yoshiichi Watanabe
MF	(Japan) Atsuyoshi Furuta
MF	(Japan) Teruhiro Miyazaki	Substituted off
MF	(Japan) Shigetomi Nakano
FW	(Japan) Minoru Yamade
FW	(Japan) Riki Suzuki
Substitutes:
FW	(Japan) Katsuyuki Kawachi	Substituted on
Manager:
(Japan) Aritatsu Ogi

== See also ==
- 1978 Emperor's Cup
