= Mitsuru Komaeda =

Japanese footballer and manager

Mitsuru Komaeda 古前田 充
Personal information
- Full name: Mitsuru Komaeda
- Date of birth: April 14, 1950 (age 76)
- Place of birth: Iwate, Japan
- Positions: Forward; midfielder

Youth career
- 1966–1968: Tono High School
- 1969–1972: Osaka University of Commerce

Senior career*
Years	Team	Apps	(Gls)
1973–1982	Fujita Industries	178	(18)
Total		178	(18)

International career
1976–1977	Japan	2	(2)

Managerial career
- 1990–1995: Bellmare Hiratsuka
- 1999: Bellmare Hiratsuka
- 2003: YKK
Medal record
Fujita Industries
Winner	Japan Soccer League	1977
Winner	Japan Soccer League	1979
Winner	Japan Soccer League	1981
Runner-up	Japan Soccer League	1980
Runner-up	JSL Cup	1978
Winner	Emperor's Cup	1977
Winner	Emperor's Cup	1979
Runner-up	Emperor's Cup	1975
Runner-up	Emperor's Cup	1982
- * Club domestic league appearances and goals

Mitsuru Komaeda (古前田 充, Komaeda Mitsuru; born April 14, 1950) is a former Japanese football player and manager. He played for Japan national team.

== Club career ==
Komaeda was born in Iwate Prefecture on April 14, 1950. After graduating from Osaka University of Commerce, he joined Towa Real Estate (later Fujita Industries) in 1973. The club won the league champions in 1977, 1979 and 1981. The club also won 1977 and 1979 Emperor's Cup. He retired in 1982. He played 178 games and scored 18 goals in the league. He was selected Best Eleven 5 times.

== National team career ==
On August 10, 1976, Komaeda debuted and scored 2 goals for Japan national team against Indonesia. He was also selected Japan in 1977. He played 2 games and scored 2 goals for Japan until 1977.

== Coaching career ==
After retirement, Komaeda started his coaching career at Fujita Industries (later Bellmare Hiratsuka). He was promoted to manager as Yoshinobu Ishii's successor in 1990. In 1993, he led the club to win the Japan Football League and be promoted to J1 League. He managed the club until 1995. In August 1999, he became a manager again as Eiji Ueda's successor. However, the club finished in last place and was relegated to the J2 League. He resigned a manager in 1999 and left the club in 2000. In 2001, he moved to YKK and became a coach. In 2003, he became a manager.

== National team statistics ==
Japan national team
Year	Apps	Goals
1976	1	2
1977	1	0
Total	2	2

== Managerial statistics ==
Team	From	To	Record				
Team	From	To	G	W	D	L	Win %
Bellmare Hiratsuka	1994	1995	96	44	0	52	45.83
Bellmare Hiratsuka	1999	1999	15	1	1	13	6.67
Total			111	45	1	65	40.54
