= Tsutomu Sonobe =

Japanese footballer

Tsutomu Sonobe 園部 勉
Personal information
- Full name: Tsutomu Sonobe
- Date of birth: March 29, 1958 (age 68)
- Place of birth: Ibaraki, Japan
- Height: 1.70 m (5 ft 7 in)
- Position: Defender

Youth career
- 1973–1975: Mito Shogyo High School

Senior career*
Years	Team	Apps	(Gls)
1976–1989	Fujita Industries	173	(2)
Total		173	(2)

International career
1978–1981	Japan	7	(0)
Medal record
Fujita Industries
Winner	Japan Soccer League	1977
Winner	Japan Soccer League	1979
Winner	Japan Soccer League	1981
Runner-up	Japan Soccer League	1980
Runner-up	JSL Cup	1978
Winner	Emperor's Cup	1977
Winner	Emperor's Cup	1979
Runner-up	Emperor's Cup	1975
Runner-up	Emperor's Cup	1982
Runner-up	Emperor's Cup	1985
Runner-up	Emperor's Cup	1988
- * Club domestic league appearances and goals

Tsutomu Sonobe (園部 勉, Sonobe Tsutomu; born March 29, 1958) is a former Japanese football player. He played for the Japan national team.

== Club career ==
Sonobe was born in Ibaraki Prefecture on March 29, 1958. After graduating from high school, he joined Fujita Industries in 1976. The club won the league champions in 1977, 1979 and 1981. The club also won 1977 and 1979 Emperor's Cup. He retired in 1989. He played 173 games and scored 2 goals in the league. He was selected Best Eleven in 1978, 1979.

== National team career ==
On May 23, 1978, Sonobe debuted for Japan national team against Thailand. He played 7 games for Japan until 1981.

== National team statistics ==
Japan national team
Year	Apps	Goals
1978	4	0
1979	0	0
1980	0	0
1981	3	0
Total	7	0
