= Eiji Ueda =

Japanese footballer and manager

Eiji Ueda 上田 栄治
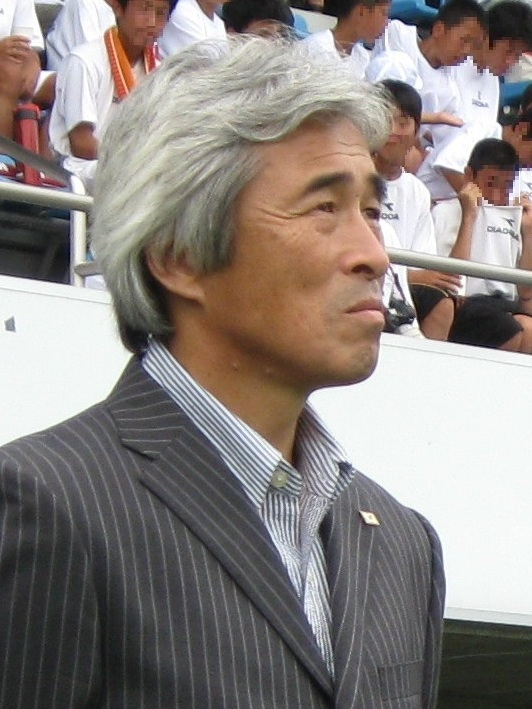
- Ueda in 2011

Personal information
- Full name: Eiji Ueda
- Date of birth: December 22, 1953 (age 72)
- Place of birth: Tateyama, Chiba, Japan
- Height: 1.76 m (5 ft 9 1/2 in)
- Position: Forward

Youth career
- 1969–1971: Yakuendai High School
- 1972–1975: Aoyama Gakuin University

Senior career*
Years	Team	Apps	(Gls)
1976–1982	Fujita Industries	88	(20)
Total		88	(20)

Managerial career
- 1999: Bellmare Hiratsuka
- 2000–2002: Macau
- 2003–2004: Japan Women
- 2004–2006: Shonan Bellmare
Medal record
Fujita Industries
Winner	Japan Soccer League	1977
Winner	Japan Soccer League	1979
Winner	Japan Soccer League	1981
Runner-up	Japan Soccer League	1980
Runner-up	JSL Cup	1978
Winner	Emperor's Cup	1977
Winner	Emperor's Cup	1979
Runner-up	Emperor's Cup	1982
- * Club domestic league appearances and goals

Eiji Ueda (上田 栄治, Ueda Eiji; born December 22, 1953) is a former Japanese football player and manager. He managed the Japan women's national team.

== Playing career ==
Ueda was born in Tateyama on December 22, 1953. After graduating from Aoyama Gakuin University, he played for Japan Soccer League club Fujita Industries (later, Bellmare Hiratsuka, Shonan Bellmare) from 1976 to 1982.

== Coaching career ==
After retirement, Ueda became coach for Fujita Industries. In 1999, he became manager for Bellmare Hiratsuka. But in July, he resigned. From 2000, he became manager for the Macau national team until May 2002. In August 2002, he became manager for the Japan women's national team. He managed at the 2003 FIFA Women's World Cup and the 2004 Summer Olympics. After the 2004 Summer Olympics, he became manager for Shonan Bellmare again. He resigned in June 2006.

== Managerial statistics ==
Team	From	To	Record				
Team	From	To	G	W	D	L	Win %
Bellmare Hiratsuka	1999	1999	15	3	0	12	20.00
Shonan Bellmare	2004	2006	74	20	24	30	27.03
Total			89	23	24	42	25.84
