= Kazumi Takada =

Japanese footballer (1951–2009)

Kazumi Takada 高田 一美
Personal information
- Full name: Kazumi Takada
- Date of birth: June 28, 1951
- Place of birth: Shizuoka, Shizuoka, Japan
- Date of death: October 1, 2009 (aged 58)
- Place of death: Suginami, Tokyo, Japan
- Height: 1.69 m (5 ft 6 1/2 in)
- Position: Forward

Youth career
- 1967–1969: Shimizu Higashi High School
- 1970: Nihon University

Senior career*
Years	Team	Apps	(Gls)
1971–1979	Mitsubishi Motors	128	(25)
Total		128	(25)

International career
1970–1975	Japan	16	(0)
Medal record
Mitsubishi Motors
Winner	Japan Soccer League	1973
Winner	Japan Soccer League	1978
Runner-up	Japan Soccer League	1971
Runner-up	Japan Soccer League	1974
Runner-up	Japan Soccer League	1975
Runner-up	Japan Soccer League	1976
Runner-up	Japan Soccer League	1977
Winner	JSL Cup	1978
Winner	Emperor's Cup	1971
Winner	Emperor's Cup	1973
Winner	Emperor's Cup	1978
Runner-up	Emperor's Cup	1979
- * Club domestic league appearances and goals

Kazumi Takada (高田 一美, Takada Kazumi; June 28, 1951 – October 1, 2009) was a Japanese football player. He played for Japan national team.

== Club career ==
Takada was born in Shizuoka on June 28, 1951. After dropped out of Nihon University, he joined Mitsubishi Motors in 1971. The club won 1971 Emperor's Cup, 1973 Japan Soccer League and 1973 Emperor's Cup. In 1978, the club won all three major titles in Japan: Japan Soccer League, JSL Cup and Emperor's Cup. He retired in 1979. He played 128 games and scored 25 goals in the league. He was selected Best Eleven in 1972 and 1973.

== National team career ==
In December 1970, when Takada was a Nihon University student, he was selected Japan national team for 1970 Asian Games. At this competition, on December 12, he debuted against Khmer. He also played at 1974 World Cup qualification. He played 16 games for Japan until 1975.

On October 1, 2009, Takada died of pancreatic cancer in Suginami, Tokyo at the age of 58.

== Club statistics ==
Club performance			League	
Season	Club	League	Apps	Goals
Japan			League	
1971	Mitsubishi Motors	JSL Division 1	9	2
1972	Mitsubishi Motors	JSL Division 1	14	2
1973	Mitsubishi Motors	JSL Division 1	18	4
1974	Mitsubishi Motors	JSL Division 1	18	3
1975	Mitsubishi Motors	JSL Division 1	17	5
1976	Mitsubishi Motors	JSL Division 1	18	2
1977	Mitsubishi Motors	JSL Division 1	17	4
1978	Mitsubishi Motors	JSL Division 1	8	3
1979	Mitsubishi Motors	JSL Division 1	9	0
Total			128	25

== National team statistics ==
Japan national team
Year	Apps	Goals
1970	4	0
1971	0	0
1972	5	0
1973	3	0
1974	0	0
1975	4	0
Total	16	0
