= Mitsugu Nomura =

Japanese footballer and manager

Mitsugu Nomura 野村 貢
Personal information
- Full name: Mitsugu Nomura
- Date of birth: November 21, 1956 (age 69)
- Place of birth: Muroran, Hokkaido, Japan
- Height: 1.84 m (6 ft 1/2 in)
- Position: Defender

Youth career
- 1972–1974: Muroran Technical High School
- 1975–1978: Sapporo University

Senior career*
Years	Team	Apps	(Gls)
1979–1989	Fujita Industries	150	(4)
Total		150	(4)

International career
1981–1982	Japan	12	(0)

Managerial career
- 2007–2008: TEPCO Mareeze
Medal record
Fujita Industries
Winner	Japan Soccer League	1979
Winner	Japan Soccer League	1981
Runner-up	Japan Soccer League	1980
Winner	Emperor's Cup	1979
Runner-up	Emperor's Cup	1975
Runner-up	Emperor's Cup	1982
Runner-up	Emperor's Cup	1985
Runner-up	Emperor's Cup	1988
- * Club domestic league appearances and goals

Mitsugu Nomura (野村 貢, Nomura Mitsugu; born November 21, 1956) is a former Japanese football player and manager. He played for Japan national team.

== Club career ==
Nomura was born in Muroran on November 21, 1956. After graduating from Sapporo University, he joined Fujita Industries in 1979. In 1979, the club won Japan Soccer League and Emperor's Cup. In 1981, the club also won Japan Soccer League and he was selected Best Eleven. He retired in 1989. He played 150 games and scored 4 goals in the league.

== National team career ==
On June 2, 1981, Nomura debuted for Japan national team against China. After debut, he played all matches until July 1982. He played 12 games for Japan until 1982.

== Coaching career ==
In 2007, Nomura signed with L.League Division 2 club TEPCO Mareeze. He led the club to won the champions and promoted to Division 1. He resigned end of 2008 season.

== National team statistics ==
Japan national team
Year	Apps	Goals
1981	8	0
1982	4	0
Total	12	0
