= 1977 in Japanese football =

1977 season

Japanese football in 1977

== Japan Soccer League ==
=== Division 1 ===
Pos	Team	Pld	W	PKW	PKL	L	GF	GA	GD	Pts	Qualification
1	Fujita	18	14	1	2	1	64	15	+49	60	Champions
2	Mitsubishi Motors	18	9	4	3	2	34	21	+13	47	
3	Hitachi	18	9	4	2	3	36	25	+11	46	
4	Toyo Industries	18	9	2	2	5	38	20	+18	42	
5	Yanmar Diesel	18	8	3	2	5	39	28	+11	40	
6	Furukawa Electric	18	8	2	0	8	33	31	+2	36	
7	Nippon Steel	18	3	2	6	7	14	29	−15	22	
8	Nippon Kokan	18	3	3	2	10	28	27	+1	20	
9	Fujitsu	18	3	2	4	9	18	38	−20	20	To promotion/relegation Series
10	Toyota Motors	18	1	0	0	17	11	81	−70	4	To promotion/relegation Series

=== Division 2 ===
Pos	Team	Pld	W	PKW	PKL	L	GF	GA	GD	Pts	Qualification
1	Yomiuri	18	11	1	1	5	41	19	+22	47	To promotion/relegation Series with Division 1
2	Nissan Motors	18	8	4	3	3	23	18	+5	43	To promotion/relegation Series with Division 1
3	Sumitomo Metal	18	6	4	3	5	33	32	+1	35	
4	Yanmar Club (Yanmar Diesel B-Team)	18	6	4	0	8	25	24	+1	32	
5	Kofu Club	18	6	2	4	6	28	28	0	32	
6	Kyoto Shiko Club	18	5	4	3	6	26	37	−11	31	
7	Honda	18	5	3	3	7	25	24	+1	29	
8	Teijin Matsuyama	18	5	3	3	7	24	31	−7	29	
9	Furukawa Electric Chiba	18	5	2	4	7	19	28	−9	28	To promotion/relegation Series with Regional Series finalists
10	Tanabe Pharmaceutical	18	6	0	3	9	21	24	−3	27	To promotion/relegation Series with Regional Series finalists

== Emperor's Cup ==
January 1, 1978

Fujita Industries	4–1	Yanmar Diesel
? (?) ? (?) ? (?) ? (?)		? (?)

National Stadium

== National team ==
=== Results ===
1977.03.06	Japan	0–2	Israel	Tel Aviv, Israel
		JFA	? (?) ? (?)

1977.03.10	Japan	0–2	Israel	Tel Aviv, Israel
		JFA	? (?) ? (?)

1977.03.26	Japan	0–0	South Korea	Tokyo, Japan
		JFA		Stadium: Tokyo National Stadium

1977.04.03	Japan	0–1	South Korea	Seoul, South Korea
		JFA	? (?)

1977.06.15	Japan	1–2	South Korea	Seoul, South Korea
	Kaneda 56'	JFA	? (?) ? (?)

=== Players statistics ===
Player	-1976	03.06	03.10	03.26	04.03	06.15	1977	Total
Kunishige Kamamoto	72(75)	-	O	O	O	O	4(0)	76(75)
Kozo Arai	46(4)	-	-	-	-	O	1(0)	47(4)
Nobuo Fujishima	45(6)	O	O	O	O	O	5(0)	50(6)
Yoshikazu Nagai	41(5)	O	O	O	O	O	5(0)	46(5)
Nobuo Kawakami	40(0)	O	-	-	-	-	1(0)	41(0)
Hiroshi Ochiai	30(5)	O	O	O	O	O	5(0)	35(5)
Eijun Kiyokumo	23(0)	O	O	O	O	O	5(0)	28(0)
Yasuhiko Okudera	19(8)	O	O	O	O	-	4(0)	23(8)
Masaki Yokotani	17(0)	-	O	-	O	O	3(0)	20(0)
Kazuo Saito	14(0)	O	O	O	O	O	5(0)	19(0)
Hideki Maeda	11(2)	-	O	O	O	-	3(0)	14(2)
Shigemi Ishii	5(0)	O	O	O	O	-	4(0)	9(0)
Mitsuhisa Taguchi	4(0)	O	O	O	O	O	5(0)	9(0)
Hiroyuki Usui	3(0)	O	O	O	O	-	4(0)	7(0)
Mitsuru Komaeda	1(2)	-	-	-	-	O	1(0)	2(2)
Keizo Imai	1(0)	O	-	-	-	O	2(0)	3(0)
Akira Nishino	0(0)	O	O	O	O	-	4(0)	4(0)
Nobutoshi Kaneda	0(0)	-	-	-	-	O(1)	1(1)	1(1)

== Births ==
- 31 October: Chikara Fujimoto
