= Kazuo Ozaki =

Japanese footballer

Kazuo Ozaki 尾崎 加寿夫
Personal information
- Full name: Kazuo Ozaki
- Date of birth: March 7, 1960 (age 66)
- Place of birth: Tokyo, Japan
- Height: 1.76 m (5 ft 9 in)
- Position: Forward

Youth career
- 1975–1977: Nihon University High School

Senior career*
Years	Team	Apps	(Gls)
1978–1983	Mitsubishi Motors	63	(18)
1983–1988	Arminia Bielefeld	113	(18)
1988–1989	FC St. Pauli	6	(0)
1989–1990	TuRU Düsseldorf		
1990–1992	Urawa Reds	15	(2)
1993–1994	Verdy Kawasaki	2	(0)

International career
1979	Japan U-20	3	(0)
1981–1983	Japan	17	(3)
Medal record
Urawa Reds
Winner	Japan Soccer League	1978
Winner	Japan Soccer League	1982
Winner	JSL Cup	1978
Winner	JSL Cup	1981
Winner	Emperor's Cup	1978
Winner	Emperor's Cup	1980
Runner-up	Emperor's Cup	1979
Verdy Kawasaki
Winner	J1 League	1993
Winner	J1 League	1994
Winner	J.League Cup	1993
Winner	J.League Cup	1994
- * Club domestic league appearances and goals

Kazuo Ozaki (尾崎 加寿夫, Ozaki Kazuo; born March 7, 1960) is a Japanese former professional footballer who played as a forward. He made 17 appearances for the Japan national team scoring three goals.

== Club career ==
Ozaki was born in Tokyo on March 7, 1960. After graduating from high school, he joined Mitsubishi Motors in 1978. In 1978, the club won all three major title in Japan; Japan Soccer League, JSL Cup and Emperor's Cup. The club also won 1980 Emperor's Cup, 1981 JSL Cup and 1982 Japan Soccer League. He was also selected Japanese Footballer of the Year awards in 1982.

In July 1983, Ozaki moved to Germany and joined Arminia Bielefeld. He was the second Japanese to play in the Bundesliga after Yasuhiko Okudera. In 1985, Arminia Bielefeld was relegated to 2. Bundesliga. From 1988, he played at FC St. Pauli (1988–89) and TuRU Düsseldorf (1989–90).

In 1990, Ozaki returned to Japan and joined Mitsubishi Motors (later Urawa Reds). He moved to Verdy Kawasaki in 1993. He retired in 1994.

== International career ==
In August 1979, Ozaki was selected Japan U-20 national team for 1979 World Youth Championship. He played in three matches as captain. On February 8, 1981, he debuted for Japan national team against Malaysia. He played at 1982 Asian Games. He played 17 games and scored 3 goals for Japan until 1983. After he moved to Germany in 1983, he was not selected Japan.

== Career statistics ==
=== Club ===
Appearances and goals by club, season and competition
Club	Season	League			National Cup		League Cup		Total	
Club	Season	Division	Apps	Goals	Apps	Goals	Apps	Goals	Apps	Goals
Mitsubishi Motors	1978	JSL Division 1	1	0						
Mitsubishi Motors	1979	JSL Division 1	13	1						
Mitsubishi Motors	1980	JSL Division 1	11	1						
Mitsubishi Motors	1981	JSL Division 1	10	5	1	1	5	4	16	10
Mitsubishi Motors	1982	JSL Division 1	18	8	2	2	2	3	22	13
Mitsubishi Motors	1983	JSL Division 1	10	4	0	0	0	0	10	4
Mitsubishi Motors	Total		63	19	3	3	8	7	74	29
Arminia Bielefeld	1983–84	Bundesliga	33	5	2	1			35	6
Arminia Bielefeld	1984–85	Bundesliga	23	4	1	1			24	5
Arminia Bielefeld	1985–86	2. Bundesliga	28	3	1	0			29	3
Arminia Bielefeld	1986–87	2. Bundesliga	13	3	1	0			14	3
Arminia Bielefeld	1987–88	2. Bundesliga	16	3	1	0			17	3
Arminia Bielefeld	Total		113	18	6	2			119	20
FC St. Pauli	1988–89	Bundesliga	6	0	0	0			6	0
TuRU 1880 Düsseldorf	1989–90									
Mitsubishi Motors	1990–91	JSL Division 1	6	1	2	3	0	0	8	4
Mitsubishi Motors	1991–92	JSL Division 1	9	1			1	0	10	1
Mitsubishi Motors	Total		15	2	2	3	1	0	18	5
Urawa Reds	1992	J1 League	-		2	0	4	1	6	1
Verdy Kawasaki	1993	J1 League	2	0	0	0	0	0	2	0
Verdy Kawasaki	1994	J1 League	0	0	0	0	0	0	0	0
Verdy Kawasaki	Total		2	0	0	0	0	0	2	0
Career total			262	57	13	8	13	8	288	73

=== International ===
Appearances and goals by national team and year
National team	Year	Apps	Goals
Japan	1981	9	2
Japan	1982	7	1
Japan	1983	1	0
Total		17	3
