= Kuniya Daini =

Japanese footballer and manager

Kuniya Daini 大仁 邦彌
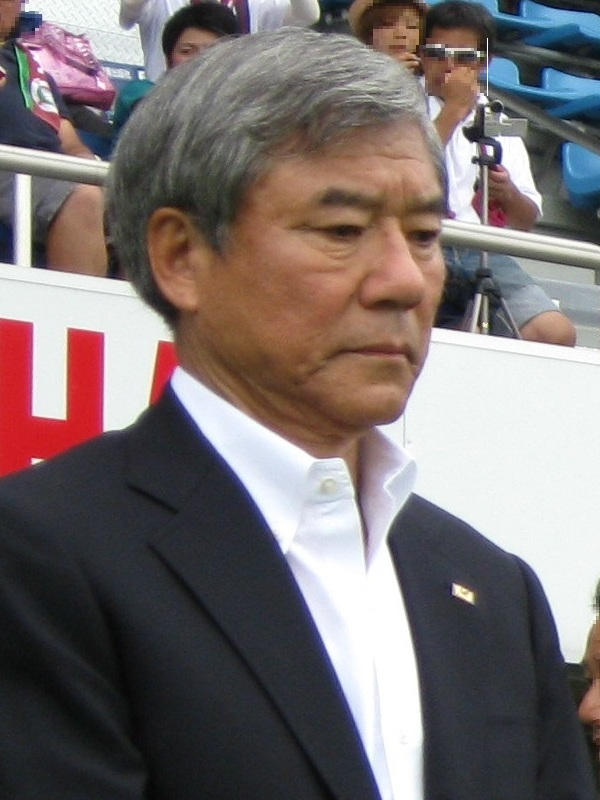
- Daini in 2011

Personal information
- Full name: Kuniya Daini
- Date of birth: October 12, 1944 (age 82)
- Place of birth: Kobe, Hyogo, Japan
- Height: 1.73 m (5 ft 8 in)
- Position: Defender

Youth career
- 1960–1962: Kobe High School

College career
| Years | Team | Apps | (Gls) |
| 1964–1969 | Keio University | | |

Senior career*
| Years | Team | Apps | (Gls) |
| 1970–1978 | Mitsubishi Motors | 119 | (1) |
| Total | | 119 | (1) |

International career
| 1972–1976 | Japan | 44 | (0) |

Managerial career
- 1984–1989: Mitsubishi Motors
Medal record
Mitsubishi Motors
| Winner | Japan Soccer League | 1973 |
| Winner | Japan Soccer League | 1978 |
| Runner-up | Japan Soccer League | 1970 |
| Runner-up | Japan Soccer League | 1971 |
| Runner-up | Japan Soccer League | 1974 |
| Runner-up | Japan Soccer League | 1975 |
| Runner-up | Japan Soccer League | 1976 |
| Runner-up | Japan Soccer League | 1977 |
| Winner | JSL Cup | 1978 |
| Winner | Emperor's Cup | 1971 |
| Winner | Emperor's Cup | 1973 |
| Winner | Emperor's Cup | 1978 |
- * Club domestic league appearances and goals

Kuniya Daini (大仁 邦彌, Daini Kuniya; born October 12, 1944) is a former Japanese football player and manager. He played for Japan national team. He is also a former president of Japan Football Association.

== Club career ==
Daini was born in Kobe on October 12, 1944. After graduating from Keio University, he joined Mitsubishi Motors in 1970. The club won the league champions in 1973 and 1978. The club won 1971, 1973, 1978 Emperor's Cup and 1978 JSL Cup. He retired in 1978. He played 119 games and scored 1 goal in the league. He was selected Best Eleven in 1973.

== National team career ==
On July 12, 1972, Daini debuted for Japan national team against Khmer. In 1974, he was selected Japan for 1974 Asian Games. He also played at 1974 World Cup qualification and 1976 Summer Olympics qualification. He played 44 games for Japan until 1976.

== Coaching career ==
After retirement, Daini became a manager for Mitsubishi Motors as Kenzo Yokoyama successor in 1984. He led the club to won the 3rd place for 2 years in a row (1986-1988). However, in 1989, the club was relegated to Division 2 first time in club history and he resigned.

From 1992, Daini worked at Japan Football Association. He served as vice-president (2006-2012) and president (2012-2016).

== Club statistics ==
| Club performance | | | League | |
| Season | Club | League | Apps | Goals |
| Japan | | | League | |
|---|---|---|---|---|
| 1970 | Mitsubishi Motors | JSL Division 1 | 14 | 0 |
| 1971 | Mitsubishi Motors | JSL Division 1 | 14 | 0 |
| 1972 | Mitsubishi Motors | JSL Division 1 | 14 | 0 |
| 1973 | Mitsubishi Motors | JSL Division 1 | 18 | 0 |
| 1974 | Mitsubishi Motors | JSL Division 1 | 17 | 0 |
| 1975 | Mitsubishi Motors | JSL Division 1 | 18 | 1 |
| 1976 | Mitsubishi Motors | JSL Division 1 | 18 | 0 |
| 1977 | Mitsubishi Motors | JSL Division 1 | 6 | 0 |
| 1978 | Mitsubishi Motors | JSL Division 1 | 0 | 0 |
| Total | | | 119 | 1 |

== National team statistics ==
Japan national team
| Year | Apps | Goals |
|---|---|---|
| 1972 | 6 | 0 |
| 1973 | 4 | 0 |
| 1974 | 7 | 0 |
| 1975 | 12 | 0 |
| 1976 | 15 | 0 |
| Total | 44 | 0 |

== Honours ==
- Order of the Rising Sun, 4th Class, Gold Rays with Rosette (2016)
- Japan Football Hall of Fame: Inducted in 2023
