= Keizo Imai =

Japanese footballer

Keizo Imai 今井 敬三
Personal information
- Full name: Keizo Imai
- Date of birth: November 19, 1950 (age 75)
- Place of birth: Kyoto, Kyoto, Japan
- Height: 1.73 m (5 ft 8 in)
- Position: Defender

Youth career
- 1966–1968: Rakuhoku High School
- 1969–1972: Doshisha University

Senior career*
Years	Team	Apps	(Gls)
1973–1980	Fujita Industries	139	(3)
Total		139	(3)

International career
1974–1980	Japan	29	(0)
Medal record
Fujita Industries
Winner	Japan Soccer League	1977
Winner	Japan Soccer League	1979
Runner-up	Japan Soccer League	1980
Runner-up	JSL Cup	1978
Winner	Emperor's Cup	1977
Winner	Emperor's Cup	1979
Runner-up	Emperor's Cup	1975
- * Club domestic league appearances and goals

Keizo Imai (今井 敬三, Imai Keizō; born November 19, 1950) is a former Japanese football player. He played for Japan national team.

== Club career ==
Imai was born in Kyoto on November 19, 1950. After graduating from Doshisha University, he joined Towa Real Estate (later Fujita Industries) in 1973. The club won the league champions in 1977 and 1979. The club also won 1977 and 1979 Emperor's Cup. He retired in 1980. He played 139 games and scored 3 goals in the league. He was selected Japanese Footballer of the Year awards in 1980 and Best Eleven for 4 years in a row (1977-1980).

== National team career ==
In September 1974, Imai was selected Japan national team for 1974 Asian Games. At this competition, on September 3, he debuted against Philippines. In March 1977, he played for Japan for the first time in 3 years at 1978 World Cup qualification. In 1978, he was also selected Japan for 1978 Asian Games. In 1980, he played at 1980 Summer Olympics qualification. This qualification was his last game for Japan. He played 29 games for Japan until 1980.

== National team statistics ==
Japan national team
Year	Apps	Goals
1974	1	0
1975	0	0
1976	0	0
1977	2	0
1978	13	0
1979	9	0
1980	4	0
Total	29	0
