= Masakuni Yamamoto =

Japanese footballer

Masakuni Yamamoto 山本 昌邦
Personal information
- Full name: Masakuni Yamamoto
- Date of birth: April 4, 1958 (age 68)
- Place of birth: Numazu, Shizuoka, Japan
- Height: 1.82 m (5 ft 11 1/2 in)
- Position: Defender

Youth career
- 1974–1976: Nihon University Mishima High School

College career
| Years | Team | Apps | (Gls) |
| 1977–1980 | Kokushikan University | | |

Senior career*
| Years | Team | Apps | (Gls) |
| 1981–1987 | Yamaha Motors | 109 | (3) |
| Total | | 109 | (3) |

International career
| 1980–1981 | Japan | 4 | (0) |

Managerial career
- 1995–1997: Japan U-20
- 2002–2004: Japan U-23
- 2004–2006: Júbilo Iwata
Medal record
Yamaha Motors
| Winner | Emperor's Cup | 1982 |
- * Club domestic league appearances and goals

Masakuni Yamamoto (山本 昌邦, Yamamoto Masakuni; born April 4, 1958) is a former Japanese football player and manager. He played for Japan national team.

== Club career ==
Yamamoto was born in Numazu on April 4, 1958. After graduating from Kokushikan University, he joined Yamaha Motors in 1981. First season, the club finished at bottom place and was relegated to Division 2. In 1982, the club won the champions and was promoted Division 1. The club also won 1982 Emperor's Cup. He retired in 1987. He played 109 games and scored 3 goals in the league.

== National team career ==
In December 1980, when Yamamoto was a Kokushikan University student, he was selected Japan national team for 1982 World Cup qualification. At this qualification, on December 26, he debuted against China. He played 4 games for Japan in 1981.

== Coaching career ==
After retirement, Yamamoto started coaching career at Yamaha Motors (later Júbilo Iwata) in 1987. He became a manager for Japan U-20 national team and managed at 1997 World Youth Championship. In 1997, he returned to Júbilo Iwata. In October 1998, he became a coach for Japan national team under manager Philippe Troussier. After 2002 World Cup, in August, Yamamoto became a manager for Japan U-23 national team and managed at 2004 Summer Olympics. In November 2004, he returned to Júbilo Iwata and became a manager. He resigned in June 2006.

== Club statistics ==
| Club performance | | | League | |
| Season | Club | League | Apps | Goals |
| Japan | | | League | |
|---|---|---|---|---|
| 1981 | Yamaha Motors | JSL Division 1 | 18 | 1 |
| 1982 | Yamaha Motors | JSL Division 2 | 16 | 0 |
| 1983 | Yamaha Motors | JSL Division 1 | 18 | 1 |
| 1984 | Yamaha Motors | JSL Division 1 | 18 | 0 |
| 1985/86 | Yamaha Motors | JSL Division 1 | 22 | 0 |
| 1986/87 | Yamaha Motors | JSL Division 1 | 17 | 1 |
| Total | | | 109 | 3 |

== National team statistics ==
Japan national team
| Year | Apps | Goals |
|---|---|---|
| 1980 | 2 | 0 |
| 1981 | 2 | 0 |
| Total | 4 | 0 |

== Managerial statistics ==
| Team | From | To | Record | | | | |
| Team | From | To | G | W | D | L | Win % |
|---|---|---|---|---|---|---|---|
| Júbilo Iwata | 2004 | 2006 | 48 | 18 | 13 | 17 | 37.50 |
| Total | | | 48 | 18 | 13 | 17 | 37.50 |
