= Superstar effect =

The superstar effect or "Tiger Woods effect" refers to the change in performance caused by the presence of a highly ranked player—a superstar—in a rank-order competition.

== Overview ==
The phenomenon was first described in a study which examined the performance of golfers at events with and without Tiger Woods. Contrary to what intuition would suggest (namely that increased rivalry encourages better performance), Brown found that the presence of a superstar was, in fact, associated with reduced competitors' efforts in rank-order tournaments. The explanation she provides is an economic model in which competing is costly—one might hurt themselves, for instance—thus when the chance of winning is very low, the participant is discouraged from performing at their best, as it is not worthwhile.

The study uses data from the Professional Golfers' Association (PGA) that contains round-by-round scores for all players in every tournament from 1999 to 2006 and hole-by-hole results for all events from 2002 to 2006. During this period, golfer Tiger Woods was performing significantly better than any other player, with scores in regular and major events being lower than the group mean in all years except 2004. His consistent and dominant performance earned him the title of superstar. Hence, the data is filtered creating a subset of tournaments Tiger Woods was a part of and other players' performances are compared to when they were competing against Woods to when they were not. The analysis shows that in events where highly skilled golfers competed against Tiger Woods, their performance was considerably worse—with scores almost one stroke higher on average—than on events where Tiger Woods was absent. On the other hand, lower-ranked golfers were less affected, or not affected at all by his presence. Brown notes that this could be due to the fact that the stakes are not as high for lower-ranked golfers to start with.

Brown investigated the possibility of other explanations as to why golfers' performances were poorer but found that it was neither due to players taking more risks nor were the other players' performances worse relative to Woods', due to the fact that better golfers avoided competitions the superstar would be their opponent in. She also dismisses the idea that it was the increased media attention attributed to Woods' presence that caused other players to produce lower results.

Finally, Brown noted that superstars must in fact be in the "super" stage of their careers to be able to create an adverse effect: in periods where Tiger Woods was not that successful (in 2003-2004) golfers actually seem to have played better against him.

== Further research ==
Three years after Brown's study, in 2010, a similar one was conducted in Japan. The writers looked at how the presence of Japan golf superstar Kazuo Ozaki affected the game of others and their findings are in accordance with those of the paper on Woods. Their results suggest that when having to compete against Ozaki, players performed worse by about 0.3 strokes on average.

Yet another research, in 2014, examines the same effect in 100-meter tournaments, with Usain Bolt being the superstar on the field. It found a positive superstar effect, meaning that runners produced faster running times and the likelihood of setting a personal record was increased. Wanting to explain the results seemingly contradictory to those of Brown, Hill points out the simultaneous nature of running competitions (whereas in golf, players get to watch each other) and that a 100-meter race is about 10 seconds which does not leave competitors much time to alter their behaviors because of Bolt.

== Relevance in management ==
The importance of studying the dynamics of rank-order tournaments with heterogeneous competitors reaches beyond the world of sports. Numerous management strategies use competition as an incentive for better productivity, however, according to the superstar effect, if agents have to compete against a superstar, they may in fact reduce their efforts.

== Impact on ratings and attendance ==
Superstars have a broader impact than just the change in performance caused by the presence of a superstar. In the NBA, superstars lead to higher attendance at games in addition to higher television ratings. This leads to an increase in revenue for both the team which the superstar plays for, and the opposing team, as well as the league as a whole.

"The Effect of Superstars on Game Attendance: Evidence From the NBA", a research paper written by Brad Humphreys and Candon Johnson, utilizes data collected on game attendance from the 1981 season through the 2013-2014 season to analyze the effect which superstar players in the NBA have on attendance. The study shows a significant effect on game attendance and television ratings in the NBA when a superstar is playing. The results indicate that several superstar players lead to a significant increase in attendance at both home and away games. These players include LeBron James, Dwight Howard, Shaquille O’Neal, and Michael Jordan, who had the largest impact: nearly 5,000 additional fans at home games, and over 4,200 at away games. The findings of another research paper titled Stars at the Gate: The Impact of Star Power on NBA Gate Revenues, further support this conclusion. The paper highlights that star power increases the demand which fans have for the NBA. It also points out that to truly measure the impact which the superstar effect has on revenues, the impact on away attendance must be measured as well. This supports the conclusion reached by Humphreys and Johnson.

A 1997 paper analyzes television ratings, merchandise sales and game attendance to determine the economic value of superstars in the NBA. The study determines that Michael Jordan was worth over $50 million to other teams in the NBA. In addition to Jordan, superstars such as Magic Johnson and Larry Bird also had a large impact on attendance in games which they played. The final results of the study determine that when a superstar plays in a game, this creates positive externalities for the opposing team. This is due to the team receiving benefits which they are not paying for.

Examples of the effect which superstars have on attendance and television ratings are not limited to the NBA. Another prevalent example is within the PGA Tour. The research paper "Superstars, Uncertainty of Outcome, and PGA Tour Television Ratings", finds that ratings for the PGA Tour are driven primarily by stars. This is more clearly shown using the 2014 US Open as an example. Martin Kaymer dominated the tournament, however television ratings were shockingly low. The study compares this to Tiger Woods dominant win at the 2000 US Open, where he was victorious by 15 strokes. Although it was evident that Woods would win the tournament, ratings were much higher than they were in 2014. This suggests the presence of a superstar effect in golf, especially when Tiger Woods was competing. In the conducted research variables indicating the presence of Tiger Woods and Phil Mickelson were statistically significant, whereas variables showing how much the leader is ahead, and the total number of competitors were not significant, further showing that stars are the true driving factor for ratings on the PGA Tour.
