= 1981 JSL Cup final =

Mitsubishi Motors	Toshiba
4	4
- Date: July 19, 1981
- Venue: Utsunomiya Football Stadium, Tochigi

1981 JSL Cup final was the sixth final of the JSL Cup competition. The final was played at Utsunomiya Football Stadium in Tochigi on July 19, 1981. Mitsubishi Motors and Toshiba won the championship.

== Overview ==
Mitsubishi Motors and Toshiba won the Championship. Mitsubishi Motors is 2nd title, Toshiba is 1st title.

== Match details ==
July 19, 1981

Mitsubishi Motors	4-4	Toshiba
? (?) ? (?) ? (?) ? (?)		? (?) ? (?) ? (?) ? (?)

Utsunomiya Football Stadium

== See also ==
- 1981 JSL Cup
