= Naoji Ito =

Japanese footballer

Naoji Ito 伊藤 直司
Personal information
- Full name: Naoji Ito
- Date of birth: July 1, 1959 (age 67)
- Place of birth: Mie, Japan
- Height: 1.73 m (5 ft 8 in)
- Position: Midfielder

Youth career
- 1975–1977: Yokkaichi Chuo Kogyo High School

Senior career*
| Years | Team | Apps | (Gls) |
| 1978–1986 | Honda | | |
| 1988–1993 | PJM Futures | | |

International career
| 1981 | Japan | 1 | (0) |
- * Club domestic league appearances and goals

Naoji Ito (伊藤 直司, Itō Naoji; born July 1, 1959) is a former Japanese football player. He played for Japan national team.

== Club career ==
Ito was born in Mie Prefecture on July 1, 1959. After graduating from high school, he joined the Japan Soccer League Division 2 club Honda in 1978. In 1980, the club won the championship and was promoted to Division 1. In 1985-86, the club won third place and he left the club at the end of the season. He joined PJM Futures in 1988. He retired in 1993.

== National team career ==
On June 19, 1981, Ito debuted for Japan national team against Malaysia.

== National team statistics ==
Japan national team
| Year | Apps | Goals |
|---|---|---|
| 1981 | 1 | 0 |
| Total | 1 | 0 |
