= Masaaki Kato =

Japanese footballer

Masaaki Kato 加藤 正明
Personal information
- Full name: Masaaki Kato
- Date of birth: December 22, 1958 (age 67)
- Place of birth: Nagoya, Aichi, Japan
- Height: 1.77 m (5 ft 9 1/2 in)
- Positions: Midfielder; forward

Youth career
- 1974–1976: Aichi High School
- 1977–1980: Hosei University

Senior career*
Years	Team	Apps	(Gls)
1981–1983	Toshiba		
1985–????	All Nippon Airways		

International career
1981	Japan	3	(1)
Medal record
Toshiba
Winner	JSL Cup	1981
- * Club domestic league appearances and goals

Masaaki Kato (加藤 正明, Kato Masaaki; born December 22, 1958) is a former Japanese football player. He played for the Japan national team.

== Club career ==
Kato was born in Nagoya on December 22, 1958. After graduating from Hosei University, he joined the Japan Soccer League's Division 2 club Toshiba in 1981. The club won the 1981 JSL Cup. However, he left the club due to an injury in 1983. In 1985, he joined the Division 1 club All Nippon Airways.

== National team career ==
On August 30, 1981, Kato debuted for Japan national team against Malaysia. On September 3, he scored a goal against India. He played 3 games and scored 1 goal for Japan in 1981.

== National team statistics ==
Japan national team
Year	Apps	Goals
1981	3	1
Total	3	1
