= Carvalho (footballer) =

Brazilian footballer (born 1952)

Personal information
- Full name: João Dixon Carvalho
- Date of birth: 1952 (age 73–74)
- Place of birth: São Paulo, Brazil
- Height: 1.72 m (5 ft 8 in)
- Position: Forward

Senior career*
Years	Team	Apps	(Gls)
- Guarani
- Barretos
- Fluminense
- Porto Alegre
- Rio Preto
1975–1982	Towa Real Estate/Fujita Industry		
1983–1986	Yokohama Tristar/ANA		
- * Club domestic league appearances and goals

João Dixon Carvalho (born 1952) is a Brazilian former football player.

== Career ==
Carvalho was one of several foreign players in the Japan Soccer League, and during the 1977 season, he became the first foreign player to win the top scorer in the Japan Soccer League First Division. Carvalho scored a total of 77 goals in the league becoming the fourth all-time top scorer in the Japan Soccer League First Division history.

== Personal honors ==
- Japanese Footballer of the Year - 1 (1977)
- Japan Soccer League First Division Top Scorer - 2 (1977 (on his own), 1978 (shared with Kunishige Kamamoto))
- Japan Soccer League First Division Best Eleven - 5 (1977, 1978, 1979, 1980, 1981)
