= 1977 Emperor's Cup =

Japanese football tournament

Tournament details
- Country: Japan
- Teams: 28

Final positions
- Champions: Fujita Industries
- Runners-up: Yanmar Diesel
- Semifinalists: Furukawa Electric; Mitsubishi Motors

Statistics of Emperor's Cup in the 1977 season.

== Overview ==
It was contested by 28 teams, and Fujita Industries won the championship.

== Results ==
=== First round ===
- Dainichi Cable Industries 4–2 Mitsui Sosen
- Toyota Motors 1–5 Tokyo University of Agriculture
- Teijin Matsuyama 0–2 Nippon Steel
- Hitachi 0–1 Yamaha Motors
- Gonohe Town Hall 2–7 Yomiuri
- Fukuoka University 1–0 NTT Kinki
- Waseda University 5–1 Sapporo University
- Osaka University of Health and Sport Sciences 7–0 Fukui Bank
- Sumitomo Metals 3–2 Nippon Kokan
- Toyo Industries 3–1 Kyushu Sangyo University
- Osaka University of Commerce 1–3 Fujitsu
- Honda 1–0 Nissan Motors

=== Second round ===
- Furukawa Electric 3–0 Dainichi Cable Industries
- Tokyo University of Agriculture 3–1 Nippon Steel
- Yamaha Motors 0–1 Yomiuri
- Fukuoka University 1–5 Yanmar Diesel
- Fujita Industries 3–2 Waseda University
- Osaka University of Health and Sport Sciences 0–1 Sumitomo Metals
- Toyo Industries 1–0 Fujitsu
- Honda 0–2 Mitsubishi Motors

=== Quarterfinals ===
- Furukawa Electric 3–2 Tokyo University of Agriculture
- Yomiuri 0–2 Yanmar Diesel
- Fujita Industries 4–3 Sumitomo Metals
- Toyo Industries 0–4 Mitsubishi Motors

=== Semifinals ===
- Furukawa Electric 0–1 Yanmar Diesel
- Fujita Industries 2–1 Mitsubishi Motors

=== Final ===
- Yanmar Diesel 1–4 Fujita Industries

Fujita Industries won the championship.
