= Osaka University of Commerce =

Higher education institution in Osaka Prefecture, Japan

Coordinates: 34°39′59.9″N 135°35′5.3″E

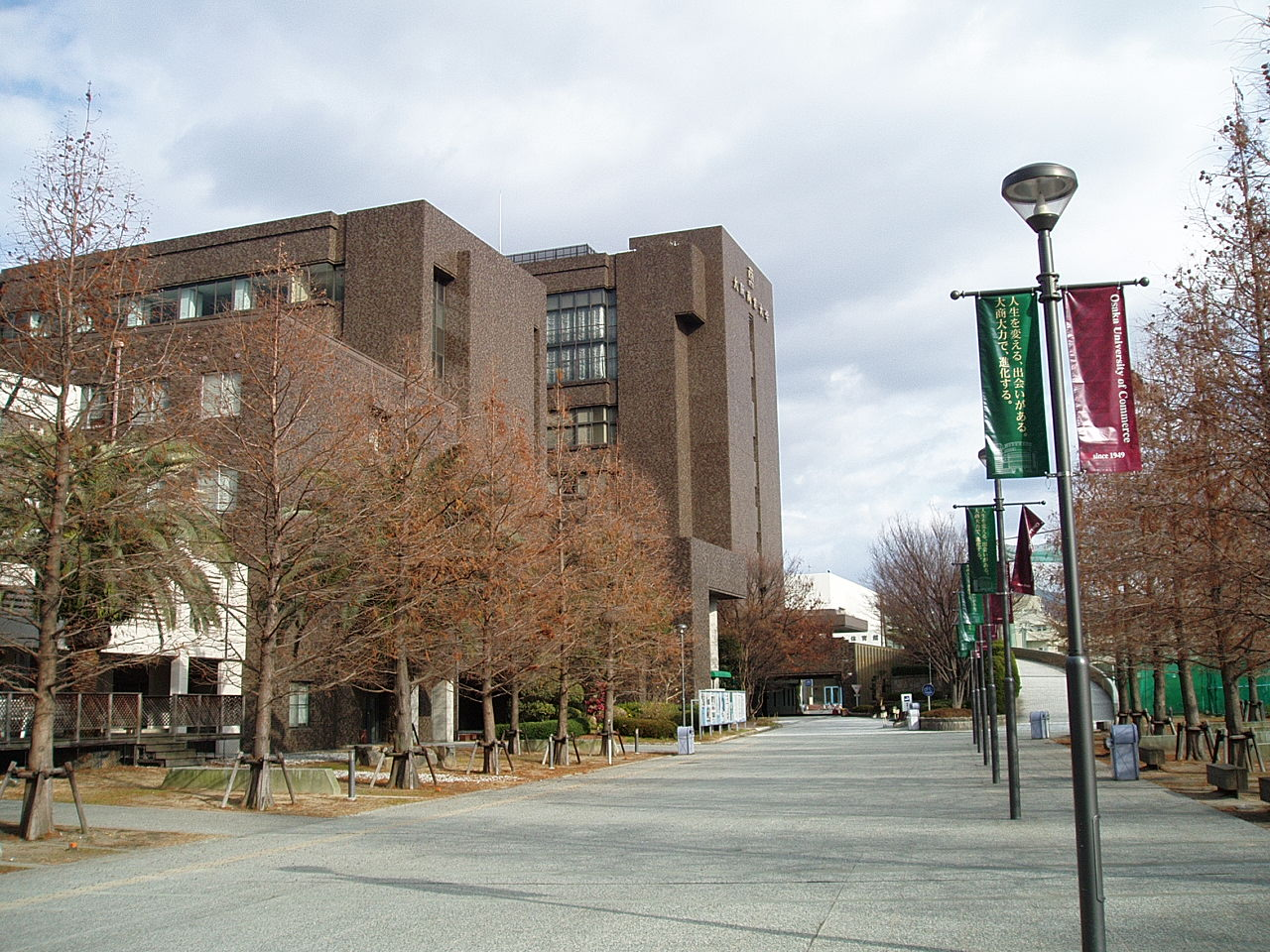
Osaka University of Commerce

Osaka University of Commerce (大阪商業大学, Ōsaka shōgyō daigaku), abbreviated to Daishōdai (大商大), is a private university located in Higashiosaka City, Osaka Prefecture, Japan.

== History ==
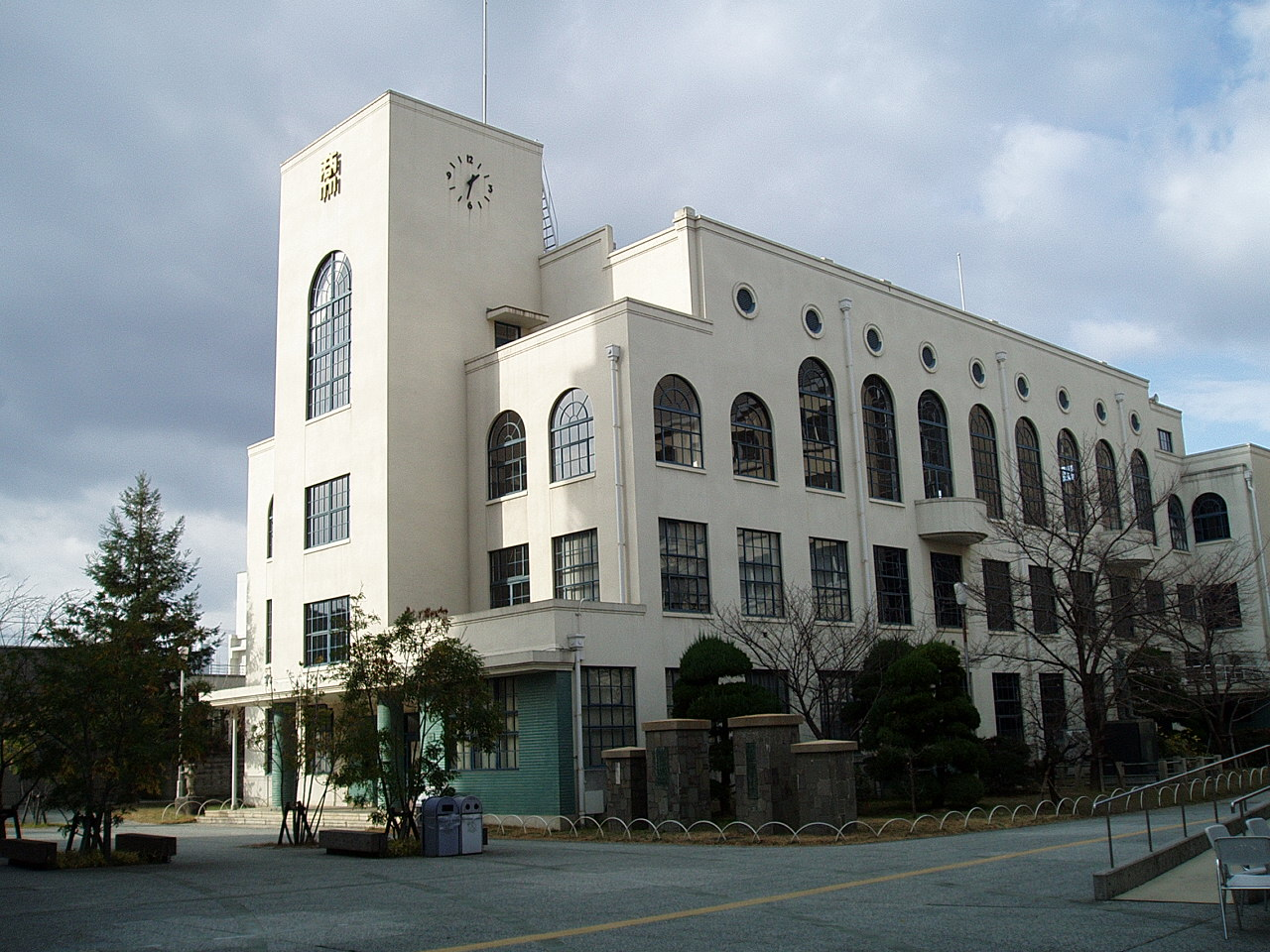
Tanioka Memorial Hall

The origin was founded in 1928 as Osaka Joto School of Commerce (大阪城東商業学校) by Noboru Tanioka (谷岡登, 1894–1974). This was a five-year school for boys (for ages 12–17 or above). In 1934 the school was hit by Typhoon Muroto, and the school building was rebuilt with reinforced concrete in 1935 (Tanioka Memorial Hall today). In 1944, during World War II, the school was forcedly reorganized into Fusé Technical School (布施工業学校), which was restored to a commercial school after the war.

In September 1947, the school was merged with Katano Women's College (交野女子専門学校) to constitute Joto Vocational College (城東専門学校, a three-year college for ages 17–20 or above). The former commercial school was reorganized into a high school in 1948 under Japan's new educational systems (Osaka University of Commerce High School today).

In 1949 Joto Vocational College was developed into Joto Vocational University (大阪城東大学, Ōsaka jōtō daigaku). JVU had one faculty: Faculty of Economics. The university was renamed Osaka University of Commerce in 1952, and its faculty too was renamed Faculty of Commerce and Economics.

In 1997 OUC established Graduate School (Regional Policy Studies, a master's degree course).

In 1999 Graduate School added a doctoral degree course.

In 2000 Faculty of Commerce and Economics was reorganized into two faculties: Economics and Business Administration.

== Faculties (Undergraduate Schools) ==
- Economics
  - Department of Economics
- Business Administration
  - Department of Management
  - Department of Commerce
  - Department of Public Management

== Graduate school ==
- Regional Policy Studies

== Institutes ==
- Institute of Regional Studies
- Institute of Amusement Industry Studies
- Museum of Commercial History (in Tanioka Memorial Hall)
- U-Media Center Gateway (Library)
