= 1982 Emperor's Cup =

Tournament details
- Country: Japan

Final positions
- Champions: Yamaha Motors
- Runners-up: Furukawa Electric
- Semifinalists: Yanmar Diesel; Yomiuri FC

Statistics of Emperor's Cup in the 1982 season.

== Overview ==
It was contested by 28 teams, and Yamaha Motors won the championship.

== Results ==
=== 1st round ===
- Nippon Sport Science University 1–1 (PK 2–1) Morioka Zebra
- Nippon Kokan 2–0 Yamaguchi Teachers
- Osaka University of Commerce 1–2 Mazda
- Furukawa Electric 3–1 Fukuoka University
- Kyoto Sangyo University 0–4 Nippon Steel
- Teijin 0–2 Matsushita Electric
- Tanabe Pharmaceuticals 2–1 Daikyo Oil
- Toshiba 1–2 Yamaha Motors
- Fujitsu 4–3 Honda
- Hitachi 3–1 Kokushikan University
- Sapporo University 1–2 Nissan Motors
- Nissei Plastic Industry 1–2 Tokyo University of Agriculture

=== 2nd round ===
- Fujita Industries 6–2 Nippon Sport Science University
- Nippon Kokan 1–2 Mazda
- Furukawa Electric 3–0 Nippon Steel
- Matsushita Electric 2–4 Yanmar Diesel
- Mitsubishi Motors 2–0 Tanabe Pharmaceuticals
- Yamaha Motors 1–0 Fujitsu
- Hitachi 3–1 Nissan Motors
- Tokyo University of Agriculture 0–2 Yomiuri

=== Quarterfinals ===
- Fujita Industries 3–0 Mazda
- Furukawa Electric 0–0 (PK 2–3) Yanmar Diesel
- Mitsubishi Motors 0–1 Yamaha Motors
- Hitachi 0–1 Yomiuri

=== Semifinals ===
- Fujita Industries 1–0 Yanmar Diesel
- Yamaha Motors 2–0 Yomiuri

=== Final ===
- Fujita Industries 0–1 Yamaha Motors

Yamaha Motors won the championship.
