= Sapporo University =

Private university in Sapporo, Hokkaido, Japan

Coordinates: 43.011237°N 141.383529°E

- 札幌大学
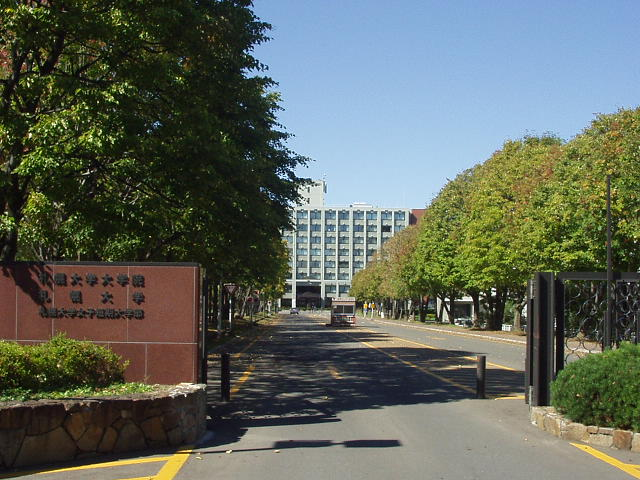
- Type: Private
- Established: 1967
- Location: Sapporo, Hokkaidō, Japan
- Website: Official website

Sapporo University (札幌大学, Sapporo Daigaku), also known as 札大 (Satsu-dai) for an abbreviation, is a private university in Sapporo, Japan.

== History ==
The university was founded in 1967. In 2018, 2775 students were enrolled at the university, including 103 foreign students.

== Teaching staff ==
- Yūtokutaishi Akiyama, artist
- Carlo Forlivesi, composer
- Tama Morita, writer

== Junior college ==
The junior college department was established in 1968.

== Alumni ==
- Kazuya Kawabata, footballer
