= 1980 Emperor's Cup =

Tournament details
- Country: Japan

Final positions
- Champions: Mitsubishi Motors
- Runners-up: Tanabe Pharmaceuticals
- Semifinalists: Yomiuri FC; Hitachi

Statistics of Emperor's Cup in the 1980 season.

== Overview ==
It was contested by 30 teams, and Mitsubishi Motors won the championship.

== Results ==
=== 1st round ===
- Kyushu Sangyo University 2–3 Teijin
- Fujitsu 2–2 (PK 8–9) Osaka University of Economics
- Hyōgo Teachers 0–1 Nippon Steel
- Toyo Industries 2–0 Fukuoka University
- Mazda Auto Hiroshima 2–3 Yamaha Motors
- Honda 2–3 Tanabe Pharmaceuticals
- Osaka University of Health and Sport Sciences 0–2 Yanmar Diesel
- Hitachi 4–1 Matsushima Club
- Komazawa University 2–1 Nissan Motors
- Hosei University 2–1 Fujieda City Hall
- Tsukuba University 0–1 Furukawa Electric
- Mitsubishi Motors 3–0 Furukawa Electric Chiba
- Nippon Steel Muroran 0–3 Toshiba
- Nissei Resin Industry 0–2 Sumitomo Metals

=== 2nd round ===
- Yomiuri 6–1 Teijin
- Osaka University of Economics 0–1 Nippon Steel
- Toyo Industries 3–2 Yamaha Motors
- Tanabe Pharmaceuticals 1–0 Yanmar Diesel
- Hitachi 3–1 Komazawa University
- Hosei University 0–3 Furukawa Electric
- Mitsubishi Motors 3–1 Toshiba
- Sumitomo Metals 0–8 Fujita Industries

=== Quarterfinals ===
- Yomiuri 3–2 Nippon Steel
- Toyo Industries 0–0 (PK 3–4) Tanabe Pharmaceuticals
- Hitachi 0–0 (PK 3–1) Furukawa Electric
- Mitsubishi Motors 2–1 Fujita Industries

=== Semifinals ===
- Yomiuri 1–1 (PK 3–5) Tanabe Pharmaceuticals
- Hitachi 1–2 Mitsubishi Motors

=== Final ===
- Tanabe Pharmaceuticals 0–1 Mitsubishi Motors

Mitsubishi Motors won the championship.
