= 1981 JSL Cup =

Tournament details
- Country: Japan

Final positions
- Champions: Toshiba and Mitsubishi Motors
- Runners-up: None
- Semifinalists: Furukawa Electric; Fujita Industries

Statistics of JSL Cup in the 1981 season.

== Overview ==
It was contested by 20 teams, and Toshiba and Mitsubishi Motors won the championship.

== Results ==
=== 1st round ===
- Honda 3-0 Tanabe Pharmaceuticals
- Toshiba 2-1 Sumitomo Metals
- Yomiuri 1-2 Nippon Kokan
- Mitsubishi Motors 4-0 Teijin Matsuyama

=== 2nd round ===
- Kofu 3-2 Nagoya
- Honda 0-3 Furukawa Electric
- Yamaha Motors 2-4 Toshiba
- Nissan Motors 3-0 Nippon Steel
- Hitachi 5-1 Toyota Motors
- Nippon Kokan 1-2 Fujita Industries
- Yanmar Diesel 3-5 Mitsubishi Motors
- Mazda 0-2 Fujitsu

=== Quarterfinals ===
- Kofu 1-6 Furukawa Electric
- Toshiba 3-1 Nissan Motors
- Hitachi 3-5 Fujita Industries
- Mitsubishi Motors 1-1 (PK 5–3) Fujitsu

=== Semifinals ===
- Furukawa Electric 2-2 (PK 2–3) Toshiba
- Fujita Industries 2-4 Mitsubishi Motors

=== Final ===
- Toshiba 4-4 Mitsubishi Motors

Toshiba and Mitsubishi Motors won the championship
