= 1978 Japan Soccer League =

Japan Soccer League
- Season: 1978
- Teams: 10
- Champions: Mitsubishi Motors; 3rd title
- Runner up: Yanmar Diesel
- Matches: 90
- Goals: 255 (2.83 per match)
- Top goalscorer: (Brazil) Carvalho; Kunishige Kamamoto (15 goals)

Statistics of Japan Soccer League for the 1978 season.

== First Division ==
By winning the 1978 Emperor's Cup and 1978 Japan Soccer League Cup along with the title, Mitsubishi completed the first Japanese treble ever. The following rule is applied: 4 points for a win; drawn matches decided by penalty shootout, with winners receiving 2 points and losers 1 point.

Pos	Team	Pld	W	PKW	PKL	L	GF	GA	GD	Pts	Qualification
1	Mitsubishi Motors	18	13	1	0	4	30	13	+17	54	Champions
2	Yanmar Diesel	18	11	1	1	5	33	26	+7	47	
3	Fujita	18	9	3	4	2	35	14	+21	46	
4	Yomiuri	18	10	1	1	6	40	30	+10	43	
5	Hitachi	18	8	1	0	9	26	30	−4	34	
6	Toyo Industries	18	7	3	0	8	23	34	−11	34	
7	Nippon Kokan	18	7	0	2	9	19	21	−2	30	
8	Nippon Steel	18	5	2	2	9	16	18	−2	26	
9	Fujitsu	18	3	1	3	11	14	29	−15	17	To promotion/relegation Series
10	Furukawa Electric	18	3	1	1	13	9	30	−21	15	To promotion/relegation Series

Source: RSSSF

=== Promotion/relegation Series ===
JSL Division 1	1st leg	2nd leg	JSL Division 2
Fujitsu	0-2	1-2	Nissan Motors
Furukawa Electric	1-0	0-0	Honda

Nissan promoted, Fujitsu relegated.

== Second Division ==
The following rule is applied: 4 points for a win; drawn matches decided by penalty shootout, with winners receiving 2 points and losers 1 point.

Pos	Team	Pld	W	PKW	PKL	L	GF	GA	GD	Pts	Qualification
1	Honda	18	13	1	3	1	39	9	+30	57	To promotion/relegation Series with Division 1
2	Nissan Motors	18	10	2	2	4	30	16	+14	46	To promotion/relegation Series with Division 1
3	Kofu Club	18	9	1	0	8	32	33	−1	38	
4	Yanmar Club	18	8	3	0	7	29	31	−2	38	
5	Tanabe Pharmaceutical	18	7	3	3	5	23	16	+7	37	
6	Teijin	18	7	2	2	7	25	22	+3	34	
7	Toshiba Horikawacho	18	7	2	2	7	20	20	0	34	
8	Sumitomo Metal	18	7	0	2	9	29	28	+1	30	
9	Toyota Motors	18	5	1	0	12	26	42	−16	22	To promotion/relegation Series with Regional Series finalists
10	Kyoto Shiko Club	18	1	1	2	14	15	51	−36	8	To promotion/relegation Series with Regional Series finalists

Source: RSSSF

=== Promotion/relegation Series ===
JSL	1st leg	2nd leg	Regional Series
Toyota Motors	1-0	1-2	Toho Titanium (runner-up)
Kyoto Shiko Club	0-3	1-0	Yamaha Motors (champion)

Yamaha promoted, Kyoto Shiko relegated.
