= 1978 Emperor's Cup =

Japanese football tournament

Tournament details
- Country: Japan
- Teams: 28

Final positions
- Champions: Mitsubishi Motors
- Runners-up: Toyo Industries
- Semifinalists: Fujita Industries; Furukawa Electric

Tournament statistics
- Matches played: 27

Statistics of Emperor's Cup in the 1978 season.

== Overview ==
It was contested by 28 teams, and Mitsubishi Motors won the championship.

== Results ==
=== 1st round ===
- Yanmar Club 4–1 Mazda Auto Hiroshima
- Fujitsu 4–0 Kyushu Sangyo University
- Osaka Sangyo University 0–4 Nippon Kokan
- Yanmar Diesel 6–0 Osaka University of Economics
- Fukuoka University 0–4 Nissei Resin Industry
- Tanabe Pharmaceuticals 2–1 Teijin
- Gonohe Town Hall 1–5 Hosei University
- Honda 2–1 Kokushikan University
- Sumitomo Metals 0–1 Furukawa Electric
- Nippon Steel 1–3 Sapporo University
- Saitama Teachers 1–3 Yomiuri
- Toyota Motors 0–1 Waseda University

=== 2nd round ===
- Fujita Industries 5–1 Yanmar Club
- Fujitsu 1–0 Nippon Kokan
- Yanmar Diesel 7–1 Nissei Resin Industry
- Tanabe Pharmaceuticals 2–3 Toyo Industries
- Hitachi 2–1 Hosei University
- Honda 0–3 Furukawa Electric
- Sapporo University 2–0 Yomiuri
- Waseda University 1–3 Mitsubishi Motors

=== Quarterfinals ===
- Fujita Industries 3–0 Fujitsu
- Yanmar Diesel 2–2 (PK 2–4) Toyo Industries
- Hitachi 1–1 (PK 3–5) Furukawa Electric
- Sapporo University 0–5 Mitsubishi Motors

=== Semifinals ===
- Fujita Industries 0–3 Toyo Industries
- Furukawa Electric 0–1 Mitsubishi Motors

=== Final ===
- Toyo Industries 0–1 Mitsubishi Motors

Mitsubishi Motors won the championship.
