= Teijin SC =

Teijin S.C.
- Full name: Teijin Soccer Club
- Founded: 1960 (as Teijin Matsuyama SC)
- Dissolved: 2002
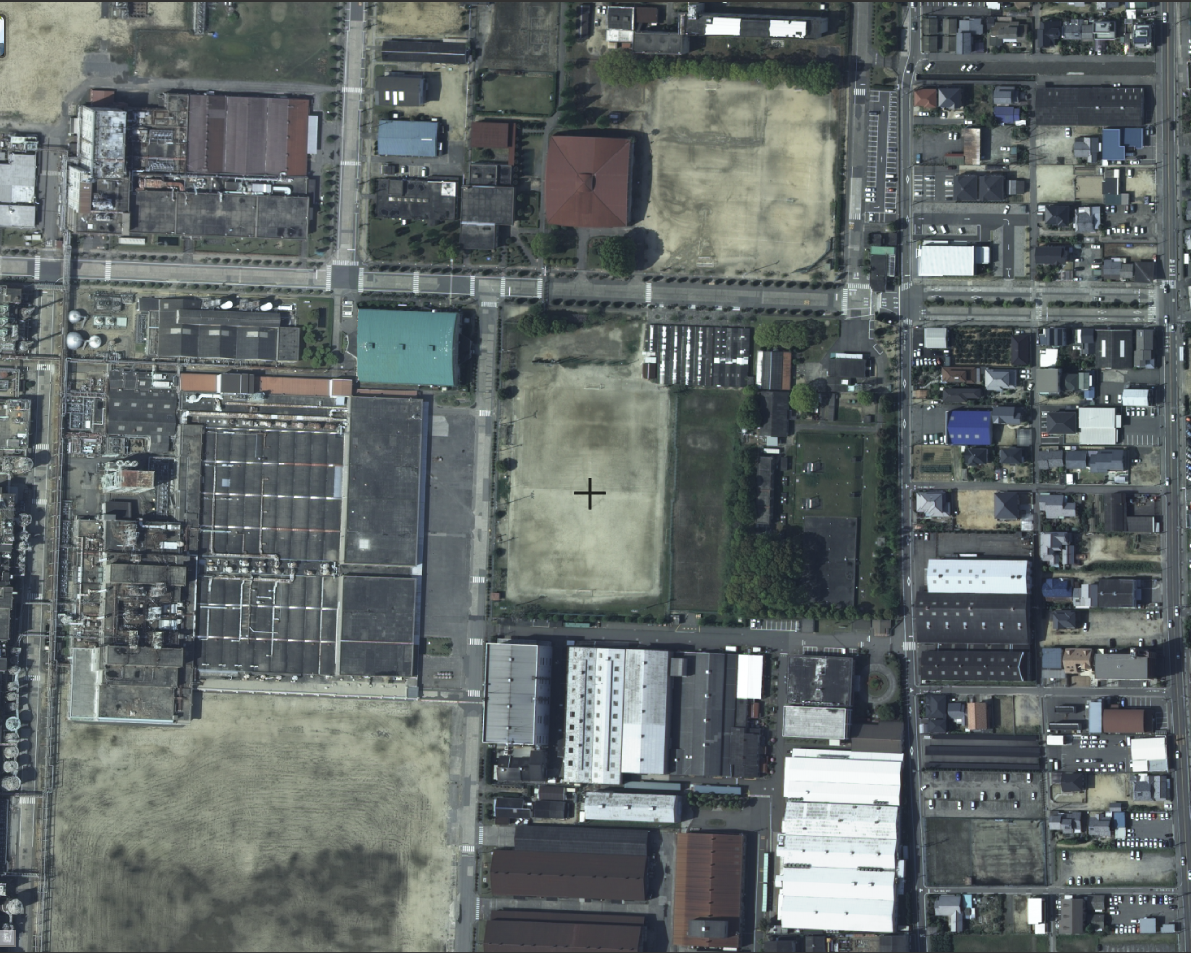
- Ground: Ehime, Japan

Teijin Soccer Club was a Japanese football club based in Ehime. The club has played in Japan Soccer League Division 2.

== Club name ==
- 1960–1977 : Teijin Matsuyama SC
- 1978–2002 : Teijin SC
