= 1981 Japan Soccer League =

Japan Soccer League
- Season: 1981
- Teams: 10
- Champions: Fujita Engineering; 3rd title
- Runner up: Yomiuri
- Matches: 90
- Goals: 214 (2.38 per match)
- Top goalscorer: Hiroshi Yoshida (14 goals)

Statistics of Japan Soccer League for the 1981 season.

== First Division ==
Fujita Industries won their third League title.

Nippon Steel, one of eight inaugural member of the First Division in 1965 as Yawata Steel, was defeated by Second Division runner-up Nissan in the playout and relegated, never to play top flight football again. Yamaha Motors was relegated in bottom place, having won only two matches.

Pos	Team	Pld	W	D	L	GF	GA	GD	Pts	Qualification or relegation
1	Fujita Engineering	18	11	5	2	24	7	+17	27	Champions
2	Yomiuri	18	8	9	1	32	16	+16	25	
3	Mitsubishi Motors	18	10	4	4	24	16	+8	24	
4	Yanmar Diesel	18	7	8	3	21	15	+6	22	
5	Furukawa Electric	18	7	7	4	28	23	+5	21	
6	Honda	18	5	4	9	23	28	−5	14	
7	Hitachi	18	5	3	10	22	27	−5	13	
8	Mazda	18	4	5	9	15	27	−12	13	
9	Nippon Steel	18	3	5	10	14	27	−13	11	To promotion/relegation Series
10	Yamaha Motors	18	2	6	10	11	28	−17	10	Relegated to Second Division

Source: RSSSF

=== Promotion/relegation Series ===
JSL Division 1	1st leg	2nd leg	JSL Division 2
Nippon Steel	0-3	1-2	Nissan Motors

== Second Division ==
NKK and Nissan returned after two years in the second tier, NKK also grabbing the Emperor's Cup.

Kofu Club saved itself from relegation yet again by defeating NTT West Japan Kyoto, who were looking to regain their League place. Nagoya Soccer Club, an amateur outfit who never looked like League material, went back to the Tokai regional league after a single attempt.

Pos	Team	Pld	W	D	L	GF	GA	GD	Pts	Promotion or relegation
1	Nippon Kokan	18	11	4	3	42	22	+20	26	Promoted to First Division
2	Nissan	18	11	4	3	31	16	+15	26	To promotion/relegation Series with First Division
3	Toshiba	18	12	1	5	46	21	+25	25	
4	Tanabe Pharmaceuticals	18	9	4	5	35	11	+24	22	
5	Fujitsu	18	10	1	7	31	27	+4	21	
6	Toyota Motors	18	6	4	8	33	30	+3	16	
7	Sumitomo	18	7	1	10	32	31	+1	15	
8	Teijin Matsuyama	18	5	4	9	22	34	−12	14	
9	Kofu Club	18	4	2	12	18	42	−24	10	To promotion/relegation Series with Regional Series
10	Nagoya S.C.	18	2	1	15	16	72	−56	5	Relegated to Regional Leagues

Source: RSSSF

=== Promotion/relegation Series ===
JSL	1st leg	2nd leg	Regional Series
Kofu Club	1-0	1-0	NTTPC Kinki (runner-up)
