= 1979 Emperor's Cup =

Japanese football tournament

Tournament details
- Country: Japan
- Teams: 28

Final positions
- Champions: Fujita Industries
- Runners-up: Mitsubishi Motors
- Semifinalists: Hitachi; Yanmar Diesel

Tournament statistics
- Matches played: 27

Statistics of Emperor's Cup in the 1979 season.

== Overview ==
It was contested by 28 teams, and Fujita Industries won the cup.

== Results ==
=== First round ===
- Gonohe Town Hall 0–3 Toho Titanium
- Nissan Motors 2–1 Kyushu Sangyo University
- Yanmar Club 2–2 (PK 4–2) Nippon Steel
- Hitachi 4–2 Toyota Motors
- Waseda University 2–1 Tanabe Pharmaceuticals
- Tokyo University of Agriculture 0–1 Teijin
- Tsukuba University 3–1 Sapporo University
- Mazda Auto Hiroshima 1–0 Hokusetsu Kemari-dan
- Fukuoka University 0–1 Toyo Industries
- Nippon Kokan 1–0 Juntendo University
- Nissei Resin Industry 0–4 Furukawa Electric
- Honda 3–0 Osaka University of Commerce

=== Second round ===
- Mitsubishi Motors 3–0 Toho Titanium
- Nissan Motors 2–3 Yanmar Club
- Hitachi 1–0 Waseda University
- Teijin 0–7 Yomiuri
- Fujita Industries 3–1 Tsukuba University
- Mazda Auto Hiroshima 0–5 Toyo Industries
- Nippon Kokan 0–0 (PK 4–5) Furukawa Electric
- Honda 1–2 Yanmar Diesel

=== Quarterfinals ===
- Mitsubishi Motors 2–0 Yanmar Club
- Hitachi 4–0 Yomiuri
- Fujita Industries 5–0 Toyo Industries
- Furukawa Electric 0–3 Yanmar Diesel

=== Semifinals ===
- Mitsubishi Motors 4–1 Hitachi
- Fujita Industries 3–1 Yanmar Diesel

=== Final ===
- Mitsubishi Motors 1–2 Fujita Industries

Fujita Industries won the cup.
