= 1977 Japan Soccer League =

Japan Soccer League
- Season: 1977
- Teams: 10
- Champions: Fujita; 1st title
- Runner up: Mitsubishi Motors
- Matches: 90
- Goals: 315 (3.5 per match)
- Top goalscorer: (Brazil) Carvalho (23 goals)

Statistics of Japan Soccer League for the 1977 season. This was the inaugural season of the Regional League promotion series, which replaced the Senior Cup as the source of the clubs promoted from the regional Japanese football leagues. Also is the first season in which the following rule applied: 4 points for a win; drawn matches decided by penalty shootout, with winners receiving 2 points and losers 1 point.

== First Division ==
Pos	Team	Pld	W	PKW	PKL	L	GF	GA	GD	Pts	Qualification
1	Fujita	18	14	1	2	1	64	15	+49	60	Champions
2	Mitsubishi Motors	18	9	4	3	2	34	21	+13	47	
3	Hitachi	18	9	4	2	3	36	25	+11	46	
4	Toyo Industries	18	9	2	2	5	38	20	+18	42	
5	Yanmar Diesel	18	8	3	2	5	39	28	+11	40	
6	Furukawa Electric	18	8	2	0	8	33	31	+2	36	
7	Nippon Steel	18	3	2	6	7	14	29	−15	22	
8	Nippon Kokan	18	3	3	2	10	28	27	+1	20	
9	Fujitsu	18	3	2	4	9	18	38	−20	20	To promotion/relegation Series
10	Toyota Motors	18	1	0	0	17	11	81	−70	4	To promotion/relegation Series

Source: RSSSF

=== Promotion/relegation Series ===
JSL Division 1	1st leg	2nd leg	JSL Division 2
Fujitsu	3-1	3-0	Nissan Motors
Toyota Motors	0-2	0-2	Yomiuri

Yomiuri promoted, Toyota Motors relegated.

== Second Division ==
Pos	Team	Pld	W	PKW	PKL	L	GF	GA	GD	Pts	Qualification
1	Yomiuri	18	11	1	1	5	41	19	+22	47	To promotion/relegation Series with Division 1
2	Nissan Motors	18	8	4	3	3	23	18	+5	43	To promotion/relegation Series with Division 1
3	Sumitomo Metal	18	6	4	3	5	33	32	+1	35	
4	Yanmar Club	18	6	4	0	8	25	24	+1	32	
5	Kofu Club	18	6	2	4	6	28	28	0	32	
6	Kyoto Shiko Club	18	5	4	3	6	26	37	−11	31	
7	Honda	18	5	3	3	7	25	24	+1	29	
8	Teijin Matsuyama	18	5	3	3	7	24	31	−7	29	
9	Furukawa Electric Chiba	18	5	2	4	7	19	28	−9	28	To promotion/relegation Series with Regional Series finalists
10	Tanabe Pharmaceutical	18	6	0	3	9	21	24	−3	27	To promotion/relegation Series with Regional Series finalists

Source: RSSSF

=== Promotion/relegation Series ===
JSL	1st leg	2nd leg	Regional Series
Furukawa Electric Chiba	0-0(PK2-4)	1-3	Toshiba Horikawacho (Runner-up)
Tanabe Pharmaceutical	3-1	0-1	Yamaha Motors (Champion)

Toshiba promoted, Furukawa Chiba relegated.
