= 1979 Japan Soccer League =

Japan Soccer League
- Season: 1979
- Teams: 10
- Champions: Fujita Engineering; 2rd title
- Runner up: Yomiuri
- Matches: 90
- Goals: 248 (2.76 per match)
- Top goalscorer: (Brazil) Ruy Ramos (14 goals)

Statistics of Japan Soccer League for the 1979 season.

== First Division ==
The following rule is applied: 4 points for a win; drawn matches decided by penalty shootout, with winners receiving 2 points and losers 1 point.

Pos	Team	Pld	W	PKW	PKL	L	GF	GA	GD	Pts	Qualification
1	Fujita Engineering	18	12	1	3	2	36	15	+21	53	Champions
2	Yomiuri	18	10	0	4	4	48	26	+22	44	
3	Hitachi	18	8	5	2	3	23	18	+5	44	
4	Yanmar Diesel	18	9	1	2	6	28	21	+7	40	
5	Furukawa Electric	18	7	5	2	4	28	22	+6	40	
6	Toyo Kogyo	18	5	4	5	4	20	19	+1	33	
7	Mitsubishi Motors	18	5	5	2	6	16	20	−4	32	
8	Nippon Steel	18	6	2	1	9	23	25	−2	29	
9	Nippon Kokan	18	1	1	4	12	17	43	−26	10	To promotion/relegation Series
10	Nissan	18	1	2	1	14	9	39	−30	9	To promotion/relegation Series

Source: RSSSF

=== Promotion/relegation Series ===
JSL Division 1	1st leg	2nd leg	JSL Division 2
Nippon Kokan	0-0(PK3-4)	1-2	Yamaha Motors
Nissan Motors	4-1	2-1	Toshiba Horikawa-cho

Yamaha promoted, NKK relegated.

== Second Division ==
The following rule is applied: 4 points for a win; drawn matches decided by penalty shootout, with winners receiving 2 points and losers 1 point.

Pos	Team	Pld	W	PKW	PKL	L	GF	GA	GD	Pts	Qualification
1	Toshiba	18	10	3	2	3	36	23	+13	48	To promotion/relegation Series with Division 1
2	Yamaha Motors	18	10	2	3	3	33	19	+14	47	To promotion/relegation Series with Division 1
3	Fujitsu	18	11	0	3	4	29	18	+11	47	
4	Honda	18	10	1	2	5	31	25	+6	44	
5	Yanmar Club	18	8	2	0	8	37	30	+7	36	Folded
6	Tanabe Pharmaceuticals	18	7	0	0	11	21	21	0	28	
7	Toyota Motors	18	5	3	2	8	21	29	−8	28	
8	Kofu Club	18	5	2	2	9	26	42	−16	26	
9	Teijin SC Matsuyama	18	5	1	3	9	24	30	−6	25	To promotion/relegation Series with Regional Series finalists
10	Sumitomo	18	2	3	0	13	15	36	−21	14	To promotion/relegation Series with Regional Series finalists

Source: RSSSF

=== Promotion/relegation Series ===
JSL	1st leg	2nd leg	Regional Series
Teijin SC Matsuyama	2-1	1-1	Kyoto Shiko Club
Sumitomo	1-0	3-1	Daikyo Oil

No relegations. Due to withdrawal of Yanmar Club, Yanmar Diesel's B-squad, Daikyo was promoted.
