= 1978 JSL Cup =

Tournament details
- Country: Japan

Final positions
- Champions: Furukawa Electric
- Runners-up: Fujita Industries
- Semifinalists: Nippon Steel; Yomiuri

Statistics of JSL Cup in the 1978 season.

== Overview ==
It was contested by 20 teams, and Mitsubishi Motors won the championship.

== Results ==
=== Group A ===
	Fujita Industries	Yomiuri	Hitachi	Fujitsu	Kofu
Fujita Industries	-	1-3	2-1	2-1	4-2
Yomiuri	3-1	-	4-0	2-4	1-1 (PK 3–2)
Hitachi	1-2	0-4	-	5-0	3-0
Fujitsu	1-2	4-2	0-5	-	5-1
Kofu	2-4	1-1 (PK 2–3)	0-3	1-5	-

=== Group B ===
	Mitsubishi Motors	Furukawa Electric	Sumitomo Metals	Nissan Motors	Toshiba Horikawa
Mitsubishi Motors	-	3-2	3-2	5-0	4-1
Furukawa Electric	2-3	-	0-0 (PK 2–4)	3-1	5-1
Sumitomo Metals	2-3	0-0 (PK 4–2)	-	1-1 (PK 4–5)	3-1
Nissan Motors	0-5	1-3	1 (PK 5–4)1	-	1-1 (PK 4–3)
Toshiba Horikawa	1-4	1-5	1-3	1-1 (PK 3–4)	-

=== Group C ===
	Nippon Steel	Yanmar Diesel	Tanabe Pharmaceuticals	Teijin	Kyoto Shiko
Nippon Steel	-	3-1	3-0	2-1	2-0
Yanmar Diesel	1-3	-	2-0	5-1	5-0
Tanabe Pharmaceuticals	0-3	0-2	-	2-0	1-0
Teijin	1-2	1-5	0-2	-	6-0
Kyoto Shiko	0-2	0-5	0-1	0-6	-

=== Group D ===
	Nippon Kokan	Honda	Toyo Industries	Yanmar Club	Toyota Motors
Nippon Kokan	-	2-2 (PK 4–2)	3-0	2-1	6-0
Honda	2-2 (PK 2–4)	-	1-1 (PK 3–4)	3-1	6-2
Toyo Industries	0-3	1-1 (PK 4–3)	-	3-1	3-1
Yanmar Club	1-2	1-3	1-3	-	1-0
Toyota Motors	0-6	2-6	1-3	0-1	-

=== Quarterfinals ===
- Fujita Industries 2-1 Honda
- Nippon Steel 1-0 Furukawa Electric
- Mitsubishi Motors 2-0 Yanmar Diesel
- Nippon Kokan 1-2 Yomiuri

=== Semifinals ===
- Fujita Industries 3-2 Nippon Steel
- Mitsubishi Motors 2-0 Yomiuri

=== Final ===
- Fujita Industries 1-2 Mitsubishi Motors

Mitsubishi Motors won the championship
