= Japan Soccer League =

Defunct association football league in Japan

Japan Soccer League (JSL)
- Founded: 1965
- Folded: 1992
- Replaced by: J.League
- Country: Japan
- Confederation: AFC
- Divisions: 1 (1965–1971); 2 (1972–1992)
- Number of clubs: 12
- Level on pyramid: 1 (1965–1971); 1–2 (1972–1992)
- Relegation to: Regional Leagues
- Domestic cup(s): Emperor's Cup; JSL Cup
- International cup(s): Asian Club Championship; Asian Cup Winners' Cup
- Last champions: Yomiuri (1991–92)
- Most championships: Mazda; Yomiuri (5 titles each)

Japan Soccer League (日本サッカーリーグ, Nihon Sakkā Rīgu); JSL) was the top flight association football league in Japan between 1965 and 1992, and was the precursor to the current professional league, the J.League. JSL was the second national league of a team sport in Japan after the professional Japanese Baseball League that was founded in 1936. JSL was the first-ever national league of an amateur team sport in Japan.

== History ==
Each JSL team represented a corporation, and like Japanese baseball teams, went by the name of the company that owned the team. Unlike in baseball, however, promotion and relegation was followed, as J.League follows today. The players were officially amateur and were employees of the parent corporations, but especially in later years, top players were generally paid strictly to play soccer.

Originally, the JSL consisted of a single division, but in 1972 a Second Division was added. Clubs could join in by winning the All Japan Senior Football Championship cup competition and then winning a promotion/relegation series against the bottom teams in the JSL. From 1973 to 1980, both the champions and runners-up of the Second Division had to play the promotion/relegation series against the First Division's bottom clubs; afterwards and until 1984, only the runners-up had to play the series.

Top JSL teams included Hitachi, Furukawa Electric, Mitsubishi Heavy Industries, Nissan, Toyo Industries (Mazda) and Yomiuri Shimbun, which are now, respectively, Kashiwa Reysol, JEF United Chiba, Urawa Red Diamonds, Yokohama F. Marinos, Sanfrecce Hiroshima and Tokyo Verdy. Furukawa/JEF United was the only one never to be relegated to the Second Division and kept this distinction until 2009.

JSL played its final season in 1991/92 and the J.League began play in 1993. Top nine JSL clubs, (along with the independent Shimizu S-Pulse) became the original J.League members. The others except Yomiuri Junior who merged with their parent club Yomiuri Club joined the newly formed Japan Football League.

== Champions ==
=== Division 1 ===
All clubs are listed under the names they were using in 1991–92, when the league ceased to exist. Clubs in italic no longer exist.

Club	Winners	Runners-up	Winning seasons	Runners-up seasons
Yomiuri FC	5	3	1983, 1984, 1986–87, 1990–91, 1991–92	1979, 1981, 1989–90
Mazda SC	5	1	1965, 1966, 1967, 1968, 1970	1969
Mitsubishi Motors	4	6	1969, 1973, 1978, 1982	1970, 1971, 1974, 1975, 1976, 1977
Yanmar Diesel	4	4	1971, 1974, 1975, 1980	1968, 1972, 1978, 1982
Fujita SC	3	1	1977, 1979, 1981	1980
Nissan Motor	2	4	1988–89, 1989–90	1983, 1984, 1990–91, 1991–92
JR East Furukawa	2	1	1976, 1985	1967
Hitachi	1	1	1972	1973
Yamaha Motor	1	0	1987–88	
NKK SC	0	3		1985, 1986–87, 1987–88
Nippon Steel Yawata	0	2		1965, 1966
All Nippon Airways SC	0	1		1988–89

=== Division 2 ===
All clubs are listed under the names they were using in 1991–92, when the league ceased to exist. Clubs in italic no longer exist.

Club	Winners	Runners-up	Winning seasons	Runners-up seasons
Yomiuri FC	2	2	1974, 1977	1975, 1976
Sumitomo Metal	2	2	1984, 1986	1983, 1991–92
Toshiba SC	2	1	1979, 1988–89	1982
Honda Motors	2	0	1978, 1980	
NKK SC	2	0	1981, 1983	
Toyota Motor	1	2	1972	1986, 1989–90
Fujitsu	1	2	1976	1974, 1980
Tanabe Pharmaceutical	1	1	1975	1972
Yamaha Motor	1	1	1982	1979
Matsushita Electric	1	1	1985	1987
All Nippon Airways SC	1	1	1987	1984
Hitachi	1	1	1990–91	1988–89
Eidai Industries	1	0	1973	
Mitsubishi Motors	1	0	1989–90	
Fujita SC	1	0	1991–92	
Nissan Motor	0	3		1977, 1978, 1981
Mazda SC	0	2		1985, 1990–91
Kofu SC	0	1		1973

=== League Cup ===
See JSL Cup.

=== Konica Cup ===
See Konica Cup (football).

== All-time JSL member clubs ==
Current J.League identity (in bold if competing in any J. League division) and/or standing in the Japanese football league system follows each name.

=== Original clubs ===
- Furukawa Electric (1965–1992), became **JEF United Chiba**
- Hitachi SC (1965–1992), became **Kashiwa Reysol**
- Mitsubishi Motors (1965–1992), became **Urawa Red Diamonds**
- Toyota Industries (1965–1968, 1972–1973), became Toyota Industries SC
- Nagoya Mutual Bank (1965–1966, 1968–1971), became Nagoya WEST FC
- Yanmar Diesel (1965–1992), became **Cerezo Osaka**
- Toyo Industries / Mazda (1965–1992), became **Sanfrecce Hiroshima**
- Yawata Steel / Nippon Steel (1965–1991), became Nippon Steel Yawata SC, defunct

=== Other First Division Clubs ===
In order of their promotion to the top-flight:

- Nippon Kokan (Nippon Steel Piping) / NKK SC (1967–1992), defunct
- Towa Real Estate / Fujita Industry / Fujita (1972–1992), became **Shonan Bellmare**
- Toyota Motor (1972–1992), became **Nagoya Grampus**
- Tanabe Pharmaceutical (1972–1992), became Tanabe Mitsubishi Pharma SC, defunct
- Eidai Industries (1972–1977), became Eidai SC, defunct
- Fujitsu SC (1972–1992), became **Kawasaki Frontale**
- Yomiuri FC (1972–1992), became **Tokyo Verdy**
- Nissan Motor (1976–1992), became **Yokohama F. Marinos**
- Yamaha Motor (1979–1992), became **Júbilo Iwata**
- Honda (1975–1992), became Honda FC
- Sumitomo Metal (1973–1992), became **Kashima Antlers**
- Yokohama Tristar / All Nippon Airways SC (1983–1992), became Yokohama Flügels, defunct
- Matsushita Electric (1984–1992), became **Gamba Osaka**
- Toshiba (1978–1992), became **Hokkaido Consadole Sapporo**

=== Notable Second Division clubs ===
Many of these clubs would only be promoted to the top-flight after the J.League was created.

- Kofu Club (1972–1992), became **Ventforet Kofu**
- Kyoto Shiko Club (1972–1978, 1988–1992), became **Kyoto Sanga**. Note that phoenix Kyoto Shiko Club was formed in 1993 and now competes in the Kansai Soccer League.
- Kawasaki Steel (1986–1992), became **Vissel Kobe**
- NTT Kanto (1987–1992), became **Omiya Ardija**
- Otsuka Pharmaceutical (1990–1992), became **Tokushima Vortis**
- Tokyo Gas (1992), became **FC Tokyo**
- Chūō Bohan (Central Crime Prevention, 1992), became **Avispa Fukuoka**
- TDK SC (1985–1987), became **Blaublitz Akita**

== All-time JSL First Division table ==
A total of 22 teams played in the JSL First Division between 1965 and 1991–92. Fifteen of these became professional J.League clubs; the rest were relegated to the regional leagues and/or folded.

Despite Mazda and Yomiuri's record five titles, Mitsubishi holds the record on points. Furukawa Electric holds the record for most seasons, all 27 the JSL played, never been relegated.

Name changes made outside First Division play and following the advent of the J.League system are not mentioned; see individual club pages for more information. All statistics are within JSL First Division play except for "Current division" and "Tier", which denote standing in the Japanese league system as of 2023 season.

Pos.	Club	Seasons	Pts	GP	W	D	L	GF	GA	GD	Best finish	Current division	Tier
1	Mitsubishi	26	750	460	211	117	132	682	507	175	1st	J1 League	1
2	Furukawa	27	731	482	203	122	157	705	596	109	1st	J2 League	2
3	Yanmar	26	703	460	195	118	147	679	570	109	1st	J1 League	1
4	Hitachi	24	543	416	151	90	175	581	608	-27	1st	J1 League	1
4	Mazda	22	543	376	149	96	131	526	424	102	1st	J1 League	1
6	Fujita	18	520	340	144	88	108	495	372	123	1st	J1 League	1
7	Yomiuri	14	503	280	144	71	65	481	286	195	1st	J2 League	2
8	NKK	21	396	378	98	102	178	404	601	-197	2nd	defunct	–
9	Nippon Steel	17	385	274	110	55	109	433	406	27	2nd	defunct	–
10	Nissan	12	384	244	109	57	78	315	284	31	1st	J1 League	1
11	Yamaha	11	322	226	86	64	76	255	249	6	1st	J2 League	2
12	Honda	11	289	226	72	73	81	251	267	-16	3rd	JFL	4
13	ANA	5	139	110	38	25	47	131	145	-14	2nd	defunct	–
14	Matsushita	5	128	110	31	35	44	122	152	-30	5th	J1 League	1
15	Toyota	8	105	156	24	33	99	128	363	-235	5th	J1 League	1
16	Toshiba	3	82	66	19	25	22	72	76	-4	4th	J1 League	1
17	Eidai	3	69	54	19	12	23	67	83	-16	5th	defunct	–
18	Sumitomo	3	60	66	15	15	36	50	101	-51	10th	J1 League	1
19	Nagoya Bank	6	38	84	9	11	64	76	210	-134	6th	Aichi Prefectural D3	9
20	Fujitsu	2	28	36	6	10	20	32	67	-35	9th	J1 League	1
21	Toyota ALW	3	20	42	4	8	30	38	112	-74	6th	Aichi Prefectural D1	7
22	Tanabe	1	4	18	1	1	16	7	51	-44	10th	defunct	–

In this ranking, three points are awarded for a win, one for a draw, and zero for a loss, regardless of the transition of regulation through the time as follows:

- 1965–1976, 1980 to 1987–88: 2 points for a win, 1 per draw, 0 per loss.
- 1977–1979: 4 points for a regulation time win, 2 for winning penalty shoot-out after a draw, 1 for a penalty shoot-out loss, 0 for a regulation time loss.
- 1988–89 to 1991–92: 3 points for a win, 1 per draw, 0 per loss.

== Topscorers ==
=== Japan Soccer League Division 1 ===
Year	Leading goalscorer	Goals
1965	(Japan) Mutsuhiko Nomura (Hitachi)	15
1966	(Japan) Aritatsu Ogi (Toyo Industries)	14
1967	(Japan) Takeo Kimura (Furukawa Electric )	15
1968	(Japan) Kunishige Kamamoto (Yanmar Diesel )	14
1969	(Japan) Hiroshi Ochiai (Mitsubishi Motors)	12
1970	(Japan) Kunishige Kamamoto (Yanmar Diesel)	16
1971	(Japan) Kunishige Kamamoto (Yanmar Diesel)	11
1972	(Japan) Akira Matsunaga (Hitachi SC)	12
1973	(Japan) Akira Matsunaga (Hitachi SC)	11
1974	(Japan) Kunishige Kamamoto (Yanmar Diesel)	21
1975	(Japan) Kunishige Kamamoto (Yanmar Diesel)	17
1976	(Japan) Kunishige Kamamoto (Yanmar Diesel)	15
1977	(Brazil) Carvalho (Fujita Industries)	23
1978	(Japan) Kunishige Kamamoto (Yanmar Diesel) (Brazil) Carvalho (Fujita Industries)	15
1979	(Brazil) Ruy Ramos (Yomiuri)	14
1980	(Japan) Hiroyuki Usui (Hitachi SC)	14
1981	(Japan) Hiroshi Yoshida (Furukawa Electric)	14
1982	(Japan) Hiroyuki Usui (Hitachi SC)	13
1983	(Brazil) Ruy Ramos (Yomiuri)	10
1984	(Japan) Tetsuya Totsuka (Yomiuri)	14
1985–86	(Japan) Hiroshi Yoshida (Furukawa Electric)	16
1986–87	(Japan) Toshio Matsuura (NKK SC)	17
1987–88	(Japan) Toshio Matsuura (NKK SC)	11
1988–89	(Brazil) Adílson (Yamaha Motors)	11
1989–90	(Brazil) Renato (Nissan Motors)	17
1990–91	(Japan) Tetsuya Totsuka (Yomiuri) (Japan) Tsuyoshi Kitazawa (Honda Motors) (Brazil) Renato (Nissan Motors)	10
1991–92	(Brazil) Toninho (Yomiuri SC)	18

=== Japan Soccer League Division 2 ===
Year	Leading goalscorer	Goals
1972	(Japan) Akio Okuda (Dainichi Nippon Electric Cable)	14
1973	(Japan) Michiaki Nakamura (Yongdae Industry)	21
1974	(Brazil) George Yonashiro (Yomiuri SC)	13
1975	(Japan) Toshiki Okajima (Yomiuri SC)	21
1976	(Japan) Toshiki Okajima (Yomiuri SC)	15
1977	(Japan) Toshiki Okajima (Yomiuri SC)	11
1978	(Japan) Atsuto Kazuno (Kofu club)	12
1979	(Japan) Michiaki Nakamura (Toshiba Horikawa Town)	15
1980	(Japan) Shiro Higuchi (Honda Motor)	11
1981	(Japan) Kazutaka Oishi (Toshiba)	18
1982	(Japan) Kazutaka Oishi (Toshiba)	11
1983	(Japan) Toshio Matsuura (Nippon Kokan)	18
1984	(Japan) Kazuhiro Mogi (Sumitomo Metals)	11
1985–86	(Japan) Hiroyasu Yamamoto (Matsushita Electric)	9
1986–87	(Japan) Kazuhiro Mogi (Sumitomo Metals)	11
1987–88	(Japan) Takanori Wada (Kawasaki Steel Mizushima)	14
1988–89	(Brazil) Carbanesse (Toshiba)	11
1989–90	(Japan) Masahiro Fukuda (Mitsubishi Heavy Industries)	36
1990–91	(Brazil) Wagner Lopes (Hitachi)	33
1991–92	(Brazil) Zico (Sumitomo Metals)	21

== Assists ==
=== Japan Soccer League Division 1 ===
Year	Leading assister	Assists
1965		
1966	(Japan) Takayuki Kuwata (Toyo Kogyo)	7
1967	(Japan) Saburo Kawabuchi (Furukawa Electric)	9
1968	(Japan) Ryuichi Sugiyama (Mitsubishi Heavy Industries)	8
1969	(Japan) Ryuichi Sugiyama (Mitsubishi Heavy Industries)	11
1970	(Japan) Terunori Miyamoto (Nippon Steel)	8
1971	(Japan) Ryuichi Sugiyama (Mitsubishi Heavy Industries)	10
1972	(Japan) Daishiro Yoshimura (Yanmar)	8
1973	(Japan) Michiaki Nakamura (Yongdae Industry)	10
1973	(Japan) Kunishige Kamamoto (Yanmar Diesel) (Japan) Akio Tanabe (Furukawa Electric)	9
1974	(Japan) George Kobayashi (Yanmar Diesel) (Japan) Kazumi Takada (Mitsubishi Heavy Industries)	7
1975	(Japan) Kunishige Kamamoto (Yanmar Diesel) (Brazil) (Japan) George Kobayashi (Yanmar Diesel) (Japan) Hiroji Imamura (Yanmar Diesel)	7
1976	(Japan) Yoshikazu Nagai (Furukawa Electric)	8
1977	(Brazil) Higa Seihan (Fujita Industries) (Japan) Mitsuru Komaeda (Fujita Industries) (Japan) Shinichi Yasuhara (Toyo Kogyo) (Japan) Yoshikazu Nagai (Furukawa Electric)	7
1978	(Brazil) Gyro (Yomiuri Club)	9
1979	(Brazil) (Japan) George Yonashiro (Yomiuri Club) (Brazil) (Japan) Ruy Ramos (Yomiuri Club)	9
1980	(Brazil) (Japan) George Yonashiro (Yomiuri Club)	9
1981	(Japan) Yoshikazu Nagai (Furukawa Electric)	7
1982	(Japan) Kazuo Ozaki (Mitsubishi Heavy Industries)	8
1983	(Brazil) (Japan) George Yonashiro (Yomiuri Club)	10
1984	(Japan) Kazushi Kimura (Nissan Motors)	12
1985–86	(Japan) Tomoyasu Asaoka (Nippon Kokan)	11
1986–87	(Japan) Takashi Mizunuma (Nissan Motors)	17
1987–88	(Japan) Hiroshi Nagatomi (Mitsubishi Heavy Industries)	11
1988–89	(Brazil) Masahiro Wada (Matsushita Electric)	9
1989–90	(Brazil) Ruy Ramos (Nissan Motors) (Brazil) Messias (Honda FC)	10
1990–91	(Japan) Tetsuya Totsuka (Yomiuri) (Japan) Tsuyoshi Kitazawa (Honda Motors) (Brazil) Renato (Nissan Motors)	10
1991–92	(Brazil) Jorginho Putinatti (Toyota Motor SC)	12

=== Japan Soccer League Division 2 ===
Year	Leading assister	Assists
1972	(Japan) Masanobu Izumi (Toyota Motor Corporation)	7
1973	(Japan) Michiaki Nakamura (Yongdae Industry)	10
1974	(Japan) Nao Sekiguchi (Sumitomo Metals)	8
1975	(Brazil) (Japan) George Yonashiro (Yomiuri SC)	7
1976	(Brazil) (Japan) George Yonashiro (Yomiuri SC)	7
1977	(Brazil) (Japan) George Yonashiro (Yomiuri SC)	10
1978	(Japan) Yasuo Hoshino (Toshiba Horikawa Town)	11
1979	(Japan) Toshiaki Taki (Yanmar)	11
1980	(Japan) Miyoshi Akiyama (Yomiuri Club)	8
1981	(Japan) Akifumi Fukuda (Sumitomo Metals)	8
1982	(Japan) Atsushi Uchiyama (Yamaha Motor) (Japan) Ryoichi Kawakatsu (Toshiba) (Japan) Masaaki Kato (Toshiba)	9
1983	(Japan) Kinya Yamamoto (Nippon Kokan) (Japan) Toshio Matsuura (Nippon Kokan)	6
1984	(Japan) Nippon Kokan (Tanabe Pharmaceutical)	12
1985–86	(Japan) Ryoji Taguchi (Toyota Motor Corporation)	7
1986–87	(Japan) Junichi Kawasaki (Sumitomo Metals)	12
1987–88	(Japan) Choi Deokju (Matsushita Electric)	16
1988–89	(Brazil) Perez (Toshiba)	9
1989–90	(Japan) Osamu Hirose (Mitsubishi Heavy Industries)	25
1990–91	(Brazil) Shinji Kobayashi (Kofu club)	14
1991–92	(Brazil) Pita (Fujita)	12

== Awards ==
=== Best player ===
Year	Player	Club
1988–89	(Japan) Tetsuji Hashiratani	Nissan
1989–90	(Japan) Kazushi Kimura	Nissan
1990–91	(Brazil) Ruy Ramos	Yomiuri SC
1991–92	(Japan) Kazu Miura	Yomiuri SC

== See also ==
- Category:Japan Soccer League players
- Category:Japan Soccer League seasons
