= 1976 in Japanese football =

1976 season

The year 1976 in Japanese football, or football in Japan, saw the Japan national football team lose more matches than it won.

== Japan Soccer League ==
=== Division 1 ===
Pos	Team	Pld	W	D	L	GF	GA	GD	Pts	Qualification
1	Furukawa Electric	18	11	4	3	37	15	+22	26	Champions
2	Mitsubishi Motors	18	9	4	5	28	16	+12	22	
3	Fujita	18	9	4	5	28	20	+8	22	
4	Yanmar Diesel	18	9	3	6	34	20	+14	21	
5	Hitachi	18	7	7	4	22	14	+8	21	
6	Nippon Kokan	18	6	8	4	22	21	+1	20	
7	Eidai	18	7	4	7	18	24	−6	18	Folded
8	Toyo Industries	18	5	5	8	16	20	−4	15	
9	Nippon Steel	18	5	2	11	23	30	−7	12	To Promotion/relegation Series
10	Toyota Motors	18	1	1	16	10	58	−48	3	To Promotion/relegation Series

=== Division 2 ===
Pos	Team	Pld	W	D	L	GF	GA	GD	Pts	Qualification
1	Fujitsu	18	13	3	2	32	6	+26	29	To Promotion/relegation Series with Division 1
2	Yomiuri	18	11	3	4	51	28	+23	25	To Promotion/relegation Series with Division 1
3	Tanabe Pharmaceutical	18	10	5	3	28	18	+10	25	
4	Honda	18	6	9	3	25	17	+8	21	
5	Teijin Matsuyama	18	9	1	8	32	28	+4	19	
6	Yanmar Club (Yanmar Diesel B-Team)	18	6	5	7	23	23	0	17	
7	Sumitomo Metal	18	5	3	10	27	34	−7	13	
8	Kofu SC	18	4	4	10	14	30	−16	12	
9	Kyoto Shiko	18	3	5	10	11	25	−14	11	To Promotion/relegation Series with Senior Cup finalists
10	Furukawa Electric Chiba	18	3	2	13	17	51	−34	8	To Promotion/relegation Series with Senior Cup finalists

== Emperor's Cup ==
January 1, 1977

Furukawa Electric	4–1	Yanmar Diesel
? ?' ? ?' ? ?' ? ?'		? ?'

National Stadium

== National team ==
=== Results ===
1976.01.25	Japan	1–3	Bulgaria	Tokyo, Japan
	Kamamoto 12'	JFA	? ?' ? ?' ? ?'	Stadium: Tokyo National Stadium; Attendance: 20,000

1976.01.28	Japan	1–1	Bulgaria	Osaka, Japan
	Matsunaga 75'	JFA	? ?'	Stadium: Osaka Nagai Stadium; Attendance: 5,000

1976.02.01	Japan	0–3	Bulgaria	Tokyo, Japan
		JFA	? ?' ? ?' ? ?'	Stadium: Tokyo National Stadium; Attendance: 20,000

1976.03.14	Japan	3–0	Philippines	Tokyo, Japan
	Ochiai 12', 73'; Takabayashi 17'	JFA		Stadium: Tokyo National Stadium; Attendance: 25,000

1976.03.17	Japan	3–0	Philippines	Tokyo, Japan
	Fujishima 23', 44'; Maeda 72'	JFA		Stadium: Tokyo National Stadium; Attendance: 2,000

1976.03.21	Japan	0–2	South Korea	Tokyo, Japan
		JFA	? ?' ? ?'	Stadium: Tokyo National Stadium; Attendance: 58,000

1976.03.27	Japan	2–2	South Korea	Seoul, South Korea
	Kamamoto 40', 89'	JFA	? ?' ? ?'	Attendance: 30,000

1976.03.31	Japan	0–3	Israel	Seoul, South Korea
		JFA	? ?' ? ?' ? ?'	Attendance: 20,000

1976.04.11	Japan	1–4	Israel	Tel Aviv, Israel
	Matsunaga 40'	JFA	? ?' ? ?' ? ?' ? ?'	Attendance: 35,000

1976.08.08	Japan	5–1	India	Kuala Lumpur, Malaysia
	Kamamoto 7'; Nagai 50'; Okudera 55', 70'; Fujishima 85'	JFA	? ?'	Attendance: 15,000

1976.08.10	Japan	6–0	Indonesia	Kuala Lumpur, Malaysia
	Okudera 15', 30', 73'; Kamamoto 55'; Komaeda 67', 80'	JFA

1976.08.13	Japan	2–2	Burma	Kuala Lumpur, Malaysia
	Kamamoto 57'; Okudera 75'	JFA	? ?' ? ?'

1976.08.16	Japan	2–2	Thailand	Kuala Lumpur, Malaysia
	Kamamoto 13', 25'	JFA	? ?' ? ?'

1976.08.18	Japan	0–0	South Korea	Kuala Lumpur, Malaysia
		JFA

1976.08.20	Japan	2–2	Malaysia	Kuala Lumpur, Malaysia
	Okudera 22'; Kamamoto 83'	JFA	? ?' ? ?'

1976.08.22	Japan	0–2	Malaysia	Kuala Lumpur, Malaysia
		JFA	? ?' ? ?'

1976.12.04	Japan	1–2	South Korea	Tokyo, Japan
	Nagai 33'	JFA	? ?' ? ?'	Stadium: Tokyo National Stadium

=== Players statistics ===
Player	-1975	01.25	01.28	02.01	03.14	03.17	03.21	03.27	03.31	04.11	08.08	08.10	08.13	08.16	08.18	08.20	08.22	12.04	1976	Total
Aritatsu Ogi	60(11)	-	-	O	-	O	-	-	-	-	-	-	-	-	-	-	-	-	2(0)	62(11)
Kunishige Kamamoto	56(66)	O(1)	O	O	O	-	O	O(2)	O	O	O(1)	O(1)	O(1)	O(2)	O	O(1)	O	O	16(9)	72(75)
Takaji Mori	52(2)	-	-	-	O	-	O	O	O	-	-	-	-	-	-	-	-	-	4(0)	56(2)
Daishiro Yoshimura	34(7)	O	O	O	-	-	O	O	-	-	O	O	O	O	O	O	O	-	12(0)	46(7)
Nobuo Kawakami	32(0)	O	O	-	O	O	O	O	O	O	-	-	-	-	-	-	-	-	8(0)	40(0)
Kozo Arai	31(4)	O	O	O	O	O	-	O	O	O	O	-	O	O	O	O	O	O	15(0)	46(4)
Nobuo Fujishima	29(3)	O	O	O	-	O(2)	O	O	O	O	O(1)	O	O	O	O	O	O	O	16(3)	45(6)
Kuniya Daini	29(0)	O	O	O	O	-	O	O	-	O	O	O	O	O	O	O	O	O	15(0)	44(0)
Yoshikazu Nagai	24(3)	O	O	O	O	O	O	O	O	O	O(1)	O	O	O	O	O	O	O(1)	17(2)	41(5)
Atsuyoshi Furuta	24(0)	-	-	-	-	O	-	-	-	-	-	O	-	-	-	-	-	-	2(0)	26(0)
Mitsuo Watanabe	19(4)	O	O	-	-	O	-	-	-	-	-	-	-	-	-	-	-	-	3(0)	22(4)
Hiroshi Ochiai	15(3)	O	O	O	O(2)	-	O	O	O	O	O	-	O	O	O	O	O	O	15(2)	30(5)
Eijun Kiyokumo	14(0)	O	O	O	O	O	O	-	O	O	-	O	-	-	-	-	-	-	9(0)	23(0)
Mitsunori Fujiguchi	12(0)	-	O	O	-	-	-	-	-	-	-	-	-	-	-	-	-	-	2(0)	14(0)
Yasuhiko Okudera	11(1)	-	-	-	-	-	-	-	-	-	O(2)	O(3)	O(1)	O	O	O(1)	O	O	8(7)	19(8)
Masaki Yokotani	11(0)	O	-	-	-	-	-	-	-	-	-	O	-	O	-	O	O	O	6(0)	17(0)
Tatsuhiko Seta	10(0)	O	O	O	O	O	O	O	O	O	-	O	O	O	O	-	-	O	14(0)	24(0)
Hideki Maeda	5(1)	-	-	-	O	O(1)	O	O	O	O	-	-	-	-	-	-	-	-	6(1)	11(2)
Toshio Takabayashi	4(1)	-	-	-	O(1)	O	O	-	-	-	-	O	O	O	O	O	-	-	8(1)	12(2)
Akira Matsunaga	3(0)	O	O(1)	O	-	O	-	O	O	O(1)	-	-	-	-	-	-	-	-	7(2)	10(2)
Hiroyuki Usui	2(0)	-	-	-	-	-	-	-	-	-	-	-	-	-	-	-	-	O	1(0)	3(0)
Mitsuhisa Taguchi	1(0)	-	-	-	-	-	-	-	-	-	O	-	-	-	-	O	O	-	3(0)	4(0)
Kazuo Saito	0(0)	-	O	O	O	O	O	O	O	-	O	-	O	O	O	O	O	O	14(0)	14(0)
Hiroji Imamura	0(0)	-	-	-	-	-	-	-	-	-	O	-	O	O	-	-	O	-	4(0)	4(0)
Mitsuru Komaeda	0(0)	-	-	-	-	-	-	-	-	-	-	O(2)	-	-	-	-	-	-	1(2)	1(2)
