= Hiroshi Ochiai =

Japanese footballer (born 1946)

Hiroshi Ochiai 落合 弘
Personal information
- Full name: Hiroshi Ochiai
- Date of birth: 28 February 1946 (age 80)
- Place of birth: Saitama, Saitama, Empire of Japan
- Height: 1.77 m (5 ft 9 1/2 in)
- Positions: Defender; midfielder

Youth career
- 1961–1963: Urawa High School

Senior career*
Years	Team	Apps	(Gls)
1964–1965	Toshiba		
1966–1984	Mitsubishi Motors	267	(56)
Total		267	(56)

International career
1974–1980	Japan	63	(9)
Medal record
Mitsubishi Motors
Winner	Japan Soccer League	1969
Winner	Japan Soccer League	1973
Winner	Japan Soccer League	1978
Winner	Japan Soccer League	1982
Runner-up	Japan Soccer League	1970
Runner-up	Japan Soccer League	1971
Runner-up	Japan Soccer League	1974
Runner-up	Japan Soccer League	1975
Runner-up	Japan Soccer League	1976
Runner-up	Japan Soccer League	1977
Winner	JSL Cup	1978
Winner	JSL Cup	1981
Winner	Emperor's Cup	1971
Winner	Emperor's Cup	1973
Winner	Emperor's Cup	1978
Winner	Emperor's Cup	1980
Runner-up	Emperor's Cup	1967
Runner-up	Emperor's Cup	1968
Runner-up	Emperor's Cup	1979
- * Club domestic league appearances and goals

Hiroshi Ochiai (落合 弘, Ochiai Hiroshi; born 28 February 1946) is a former Japanese football player. He played for Japan national team.

== Club career ==
Ochiai was born in Saitama on 28 February 1946. After graduating from high school, he joined Toshiba in 1964. He played at offensive position. In 1966, he moved to his local club Mitsubishi Motors played in Japan Soccer League (JSL). He played in all 260 matches in the league until 1981. In 1969, he became a top scorer and the club won the champions at JSL first time. In the 1970s he was converted to defensive position. In 1973, the club won JSL and Emperor's Cup. In 1978, the club won all three major title in Japan; JSL, JSL Cup, Emperor's Cup and he was selected Japanese Footballer of the Year awards. He retired in 1984. He played 267 games and scored 56 goals in the league. This 267 games is the second record in JSL after Yoshikazu Nagai (272 games). He was selected Best Eleven 10 times included for 9 years in a row (1973-1981). The club won the league champions 2 times, JSL Cup 2 times and Emperor's Cup 4 times.

== National team career ==
In September 1974, Ochiai was selected Japan national team for 1974 Asian Games. At this competition, on 7 September, he debuted against Israel. After his debut, he played in most games included 1976 Summer Olympics qualification, 1978 World Cup qualification and 1978 Asian Games. In 1980, 1980 Summer Olympics qualification was his last game for Japan. He played 63 games and scored 9 goals for Japan until 1980.

== Coaching career ==
After retirement, in 1988, Ochiai became coach for Japan national team under manager Kenzo Yokoyama was team mate at Mitsubishi Motors. In 1992, Ochiai became a coach for Urawa Reds (former Mitsubishi Motors) under manager Takaji Mori.

In 2010, Ochiai was selected Japan Football Hall of Fame.

== Club statistics ==
Club performance			League	
Season	Club	League	Apps	Goals
Japan			League	
1966	Mitsubishi Motors	JSL Division 1	14	6
1967	Mitsubishi Motors	JSL Division 1	14	13
1968	Mitsubishi Motors	JSL Division 1	14	5
1969	Mitsubishi Motors	JSL Division 1	14	12
1970	Mitsubishi Motors	JSL Division 1	14	2
1971	Mitsubishi Motors	JSL Division 1	14	4
1972	Mitsubishi Motors	JSL Division 1	14	1
1973	Mitsubishi Motors	JSL Division 1	18	2
1974	Mitsubishi Motors	JSL Division 1	18	2
1975	Mitsubishi Motors	JSL Division 1	18	3
1976	Mitsubishi Motors	JSL Division 1	18	1
1977	Mitsubishi Motors	JSL Division 1	18	1
1978	Mitsubishi Motors	JSL Division 1	18	1
1979	Mitsubishi Motors	JSL Division 1	18	2
1980	Mitsubishi Motors	JSL Division 1	18	1
1981	Mitsubishi Motors	JSL Division 1	18	0
1982	Mitsubishi Motors	JSL Division 1	5	0
1983	Mitsubishi Motors	JSL Division 1	2	0
1984	Mitsubishi Motors	JSL Division 1	0	0
Total			267	56

== National team statistics ==
Japan national team
Year	Apps	Goals
1974	2	0
1975	13	3
1976	15	2
1977	5	0
1978	14	3
1979	9	1
1980	5	0
Total	63	9

== Personal honors ==
- Japan Soccer League Top Scorer - 1969
- Japanese Footballer of the Year - 1978
- Japan Soccer League Best Eleven: (10) 1969, 1973, 1974, 1975, 1976, 1977, 1978, 1979, 1980, 1981
- Japan Football Hall of Fame: Inducted in 2010
