= Tatsuhiko Seta =

Japanese footballer

Tatsuhiko Seta 瀬田 龍彦
Personal information
- Full name: Tatsuhiko Seta
- Date of birth: January 15, 1952 (age 74)
- Place of birth: Morioka, Iwate, Japan
- Height: 1.82 m (5 ft 11 1/2 in)
- Position: Goalkeeper

Youth career
- 1967–1969: Morioka Commercial High School

Senior career*
| Years | Team | Apps | (Gls) |
| 1970–1980 | Hitachi | 164 | (0) |
| 1982–1986 | Hitachi | 0 | (0) |
| Total | | 164 | (0) |

International career
| 1973–1980 | Japan | 25 | (0) |
Medal record
Hitachi
| Winner | Japan Soccer League | 1972 |
| Runner-up | Japan Soccer League | 1973 |
| Runner-up | Japan Soccer League | 1982 |
| Winner | JSL Cup | 1976 |
| Runner-up | JSL Cup | 1980 |
| Winner | Emperor's Cup | 1972 |
| Winner | Emperor's Cup | 1975 |
| Runner-up | Emperor's Cup | 1973 |
- * Club domestic league appearances and goals

Tatsuhiko Seta (瀬田 龍彦, Seta Tatsuhiko; born January 15, 1952) is a former Japanese football player. He played for Japan national team.

== Club career ==
Seta was born in Morioka on January 15, 1952. After graduating from high school, he joined Hitachi in 1970. In 1972, the club won the champions in Japan Soccer League and Emperor's Cup. The club also won 1975 Emperor's Cup and 1976 JSL Cup. He retired in 1980. He played 164 games in the league. He was selected Best Eleven in 1972 and 1976. In 1982, he came back as playing-coach, but he did not play in the match. He retired again in 1986.

== National team career ==
In May 1973, Seta was selected Japan national team for 1974 World Cup qualification. At this competition, on May 22, he debuted against Hong Kong. He also played at 1974 Asian Games. In 1976, he played as a regular goalkeeper and played in all matches at 1976 Summer Olympics qualification. In 1980, he played for Japan for the first time in 4 years at 1980 Summer Olympics qualification. This qualification was his last game for Japan. He played 25 games for Japan until 1980.

== Club statistics ==
| Club performance | | | League | |
| Season | Club | League | Apps | Goals |
| Japan | | | League | |
|---|---|---|---|---|
| 1970 | Hitachi | JSL Division 1 | 13 | 0 |
| 1971 | Hitachi | JSL Division 1 | 7 | 0 |
| 1972 | Hitachi | JSL Division 1 | 10 | 0 |
| 1973 | Hitachi | JSL Division 1 | 18 | 0 |
| 1974 | Hitachi | JSL Division 1 | 17 | 0 |
| 1975 | Hitachi | JSL Division 1 | 18 | 0 |
| 1976 | Hitachi | JSL Division 1 | 15 | 0 |
| 1977 | Hitachi | JSL Division 1 | 18 | 0 |
| 1978 | Hitachi | JSL Division 1 | 18 | 0 |
| 1979 | Hitachi | JSL Division 1 | 18 | 0 |
| 1980 | Hitachi | JSL Division 1 | 12 | 0 |
| 1982 | Hitachi | JSL Division 1 | 0 | 0 |
| 1983 | Hitachi | JSL Division 1 | 0 | 0 |
| 1984 | Hitachi | JSL Division 1 | 0 | 0 |
| 1985/86 | Hitachi | JSL Division 1 | 0 | 0 |
| Total | | | 164 | 0 |

== National team statistics ==
Japan national team
| Year | Apps | Goals |
|---|---|---|
| 1973 | 2 | 0 |
| 1974 | 3 | 0 |
| 1975 | 5 | 0 |
| 1976 | 14 | 0 |
| 1977 | 0 | 0 |
| 1978 | 0 | 0 |
| 1979 | 0 | 0 |
| 1980 | 1 | 0 |
| Total | 25 | 0 |
