= Kazuhisa Kono =

Japanese footballer

Kazuhisa Kono 河野 和久
Personal information
- Full name: Kazuhisa Kono
- Date of birth: December 30, 1950 (age 75)
- Place of birth: Hiroshima, Japan
- Height: 1.68 m (5 ft 6 in)
- Position: Defender

Youth career
- 1966–1968: Sanyo High School

Senior career*
Years	Team	Apps	(Gls)
1969–1980	Hitachi	113	(0)
Total		113	(0)

International career
1974	Japan	1	(0)
Medal record
Hitachi
Winner	Japan Soccer League	1972
Runner-up	Japan Soccer League	1973
Winner	JSL Cup	1976
Runner-up	JSL Cup	1980
Winner	Emperor's Cup	1972
Winner	Emperor's Cup	1975
Runner-up	Emperor's Cup	1973
- * Club domestic league appearances and goals

Kazuhisa Kono (河野 和久, Kono Kazuhisa; born December 30, 1950) is a former Japanese football player. He played for the Japan national team.

== Club career ==
Kono was born in Hiroshima Prefecture on December 30, 1950. After graduating from high school, he joined Hitachi in 1969. In 1972, the club won Japan Soccer League and Emperor's Cup. The club also won 1975 Emperor's Cup and 1976 JSL Cup. He retired in 1980 after having played 113 games in the league.

== National team career ==
On February 20, 1974, Kono debuted for the Japan national team against Hong Kong.

== Club statistics ==
Club performance			League	
Season	Club	League	Apps	Goals
Japan			League	
1969	Hitachi	JSL Division 1	2	0
1970	Hitachi	JSL Division 1	0	0
1971	Hitachi	JSL Division 1	4	0
1972	Hitachi	JSL Division 1	1	0
1973	Hitachi	JSL Division 1	18	0
1974	Hitachi	JSL Division 1	11	0
1975	Hitachi	JSL Division 1	18	0
1976	Hitachi	JSL Division 1	14	0
1977	Hitachi	JSL Division 1	17	0
1978	Hitachi	JSL Division 1	12	0
1979	Hitachi	JSL Division 1	8	0
1980	Hitachi	JSL Division 1	8	0
Total			113	0

== National team statistics ==
Japan national team
Year	Apps	Goals
1974	1	0
Total	1	0
