= Nobuo Kawakami =

Japanese footballer

Nobuo Kawakami 川上 信夫
Personal information
- Full name: Nobuo Kawakami
- Date of birth: October 4, 1947 (age 79)
- Place of birth: Saitama, Saitama, Japan
- Height: 1.76 m (5 ft 9 1/2 in)
- Positions: Midfielder; defender

Youth career
- Urawa Nishi High School
- Rikkyo University

Senior career*
Years	Team	Apps	(Gls)
1971–1978	Hitachi	128	(7)
Total		128	(7)

International career
1970–1977	Japan	41	(0)
Medal record
Hitachi
Winner	Japan Soccer League	1972
Runner-up	Japan Soccer League	1973
Winner	JSL Cup	1976
Winner	Emperor's Cup	1972
Winner	Emperor's Cup	1975
Runner-up	Emperor's Cup	1973
- * Club domestic league appearances and goals

Nobuo Kawakami (川上 信夫, Kawakami Nobuo; born October 4, 1947) is a former Japanese football player. He played for Japan national team.

== Club career ==
Kawakami was born in Saitama on October 4, 1947. After graduating from Rikkyo University, he joined Hitachi in 1971. The club won the league championship in 1972. The club also won 1972 and 1975 Emperor's Cups. He retired in 1978. He played 128 games and scored 7 goals in the league. He was selected as one of the Best Eleven in 1972 and 1975.

== National team career ==
On July 31, 1970, when Kawakami was a Rikkyo University student, he debuted for the Japan national team against Hong Kong. He played at the 1970 and 1974 Asian Games. He was also selected by Japan for the 1974, 1978 World Cup qualification, and the 1976 Summer Olympics qualification. He played 41 games for Japan until 1977.

== Club statistics ==
Club performance			League	
Season	Club	League	Apps	Goals
Japan			League	
1971	Hitachi	JSL Division 1	14	0
1972	Hitachi	JSL Division 1	10	0
1973	Hitachi	JSL Division 1	14	1
1974	Hitachi	JSL Division 1	18	0
1975	Hitachi	JSL Division 1	18	0
1976	Hitachi	JSL Division 1	18	1
1977	Hitachi	JSL Division 1	18	3
1978	Hitachi	JSL Division 1	18	2
Total			128	7

== National team statistics ==
Japan national team
Year	Apps	Goals
1970	4	0
1971	1	0
1972	8	0
1973	5	0
1974	5	0
1975	9	0
1976	8	0
1977	1	0
Total	41	0
