= Shusaku Hirasawa =

Japanese footballer (born 1949)

Shusaku Hirasawa 平沢 周策
Personal information
- Full name: Shusaku Hirasawa
- Date of birth: March 5, 1949 (age 77)
- Place of birth: Akita, Japan
- Height: 1.65 m (5 ft 5 in)
- Position: Midfielder

Youth career
- 1964–1966: Akita Commercial High School

Senior career*
Years	Team	Apps	(Gls)
1967–1978	Hitachi	160	(20)
Total		160	(20)

International career
1972–1974	Japan	11	(1)
Medal record
Hitachi
Winner	Japan Soccer League	1972
Runner-up	Japan Soccer League	1973
Winner	JSL Cup	1976
Winner	Emperor's Cup	1972
Winner	Emperor's Cup	1975
Runner-up	Emperor's Cup	1973
- * Club domestic league appearances and goals

Shusaku Hirasawa (平沢 周策, Hirasawa Shusaku; born March 5, 1949) is a former Japanese football player. He played for Japan national team.

== Club career ==
Hirasawa was born in Akita Prefecture on March 5, 1949. After graduating from high school, he joined Hitachi in 1967. In 1972, the club won the champions at Japan Soccer League and Emperor's Cup. The club won 1975 Emperor's Cup and 1976 JSL Cup. He retired in 1978. He played 160 games and scored 20 goals in the league.

== National team career ==
On August 4, 1972, Hirasawa debuted for Japan national team against the Philippines. In 1973, he was selected by Japan for the 1974 World Cup qualification. He also played in the 1974 Asian Games. He played 11 games and scored one goal for Japan until 1974.

== Club statistics ==
Club performance			League	
Season	Club	League	Apps	Goals
Japan			League	
1967	Hitachi	JSL Division 1	11	4
1968	Hitachi	JSL Division 1	13	3
1969	Hitachi	JSL Division 1	13	2
1970	Hitachi	JSL Division 1	14	1
1971	Hitachi	JSL Division 1	11	1
1972	Hitachi	JSL Division 1	14	2
1973	Hitachi	JSL Division 1	17	2
1974	Hitachi	JSL Division 1	15	2
1975	Hitachi	JSL Division 1	18	1
1976	Hitachi	JSL Division 1	17	2
1977	Hitachi	JSL Division 1	7	0
1978	Hitachi	JSL Division 1	10	0
Total			160	20

== National team statistics ==
Japan national team
Year	Apps	Goals
1972	2	0
1973	4	1
1974	5	0
Total	11	1
