= Daishiro Yoshimura =

Japanese footballer and manager

Daishiro Yoshimura 吉村 大志郎
Personal information
- Full name: Daishiro Yoshimura
- Date of birth: August 16, 1947
- Place of birth: São Paulo, Brazil
- Date of death: November 1, 2003 (aged 56)
- Place of death: Amagasaki, Hyogo, Japan
- Height: 1.72 m (5 ft 7 1/2 in)
- Position: Midfielder

Senior career*
Years	Team	Apps	(Gls)
1967–1980	Yanmar Diesel	189	(30)
Total		189	(30)

International career
1970–1976	Japan	46	(7)

Managerial career
- 1990–1993: Yanmar Diesel
Medal record
Yanmar Diesel
Winner	Japan Soccer League	1971
Winner	Japan Soccer League	1974
Winner	Japan Soccer League	1975
Winner	Japan Soccer League	1980
Runner-up	Japan Soccer League	1968
Runner-up	Japan Soccer League	1972
Runner-up	Japan Soccer League	1978
Runner-up	JSL Cup	1977
Winner	Emperor's Cup	1968
Winner	Emperor's Cup	1970
Winner	Emperor's Cup	1974
Runner-up	Emperor's Cup	1971
Runner-up	Emperor's Cup	1972
Runner-up	Emperor's Cup	1976
Runner-up	Emperor's Cup	1977
- * Club domestic league appearances and goals

Daishiro Yoshimura (吉村 大志郎, Yoshimura Daishirō; August 16, 1947 – November 1, 2003) (former name; Nelson Yoshimura, ネルソン 吉村) was a football player and manager. Born in Brazil, he played for the Japan national team.

== Club career ==
Yoshimura was born in São Paulo, Brazil on August 16, 1947. He moved to Japan and joined Yanmar Diesel in 1967. He played with Kunishige Kamamoto and so on and leads the team to the greatest era in Yanmar Diesel history. The club won Japan Soccer League champions 4 times and Emperor's Cup 3 times. He retired in 1980. He played 189 games and scored 30 goals in the league. He was selected Best Eleven 4 times.

== National team career ==
On August 2, 1970, Yoshimura debuted for Japan national team against South Korea. He was selected Japan for 1974 Asian Games. He also played at 1972 Summer Olympics qualification, 1974 World Cup qualification and 1976 Summer Olympics qualification. He played 46 games and scored 7 goals for Japan until 1976.

== Coaching career ==
After retirement, Yoshimura became a coach for Yanmar Diesel in 1981. In 1990, he was promoted to a manager. He managed until 1993.

On November 1, 2003, Yoshimura died of intracranial hemorrhage in Amagasaki at the age of 56. In 2010, he was selected to the Japan Football Hall of Fame.

== Club statistics ==
Club performance			League	
Season	Club	League	Apps	Goals
Japan			League	
1967	Yanmar Diesel	JSL Division 1	7	1
1968	Yanmar Diesel	JSL Division 1	14	3
1969	Yanmar Diesel	JSL Division 1	14	3
1970	Yanmar Diesel	JSL Division 1	14	1
1971	Yanmar Diesel	JSL Division 1	14	8
1972	Yanmar Diesel	JSL Division 1	14	5
1973	Yanmar Diesel	JSL Division 1	18	1
1974	Yanmar Diesel	JSL Division 1	18	1
1975	Yanmar Diesel	JSL Division 1	18	2
1976	Yanmar Diesel	JSL Division 1	17	2
1977	Yanmar Diesel	JSL Division 1	15	2
1978	Yanmar Diesel	JSL Division 1	15	1
1979	Yanmar Diesel	JSL Division 1	11	0
1980	Yanmar Diesel	JSL Division 1	0	0
Total			189	30

== National team statistics ==
Japan national team
Year	Apps	Goals
1970	4	1
1971	6	2
1972	8	1
1973	3	0
1974	7	2
1975	6	1
1976	12	0
Total	46	7

== Awards ==
- Japan Soccer League Best Eleven: (4) 1970, 1971, 1972, 1975
- Japan Soccer League Silver Ball (Assist Leader): 1972
- Japan Football Hall of Fame: Inducted in 2010
