= Kenzo Yokoyama =

Japanese footballer and manager

Kenzo Yokoyama 横山 謙三
Personal information
- Full name: Kenzo Yokoyama
- Date of birth: January 21, 1943 (age 83)
- Place of birth: Saitama, Saitama, Empire of Japan
- Height: 1.75 m (5 ft 9 in)
- Position: Goalkeeper

Youth career
- 1959–1961: Kawaguchi High School

College career
Years	Team	Apps	(Gls)
1962–1965	Rikkyo University		

Senior career*
Years	Team	Apps	(Gls)
1966–1977	Mitsubishi Motors	136	(0)
Total		136	(0)

International career
1964–1974	Japan	49	(0)

Managerial career
- 1976–1983: Mitsubishi Motors
- 1988–1991: Japan
- 1994: Urawa Reds
- 2000: Urawa Reds
Medal record
Mitsubishi Motors
Winner	Japan Soccer League	1969
Winner	Japan Soccer League	1973
Runner-up	Japan Soccer League	1970
Runner-up	Japan Soccer League	1971
Runner-up	Japan Soccer League	1974
Runner-up	Japan Soccer League	1975
Runner-up	Japan Soccer League	1976
Runner-up	Japan Soccer League	1977
Winner	Emperor's Cup	1971
Winner	Emperor's Cup	1973
Runner-up	Emperor's Cup	1967
Runner-up	Emperor's Cup	1968
Representing Japan
Olympic Games
Bronze medal – third place	1968 Mexico City	Team
Asian Games
Bronze medal – third place	1966 Bangkok	Team
- * Club domestic league appearances and goals

Kenzo Yokoyama (横山 謙三, Yokoyama Kenzō; born January 21, 1943) is a former Japanese football player and manager. He played for, and then managed, the Japan national team.

== Club career ==
Yokoyama was born in Saitama on January 21, 1943. After graduating from Kawaguchi High School and Rikkyo University, he joined his local club Mitsubishi Motors in 1966. He played as regular goalkeeper from first season and played all matches in Japan Soccer League until 1974. In 1975, he was deprived of regular goalkeeper by Mitsuhisa Taguchi. The club won the league champions 2 times (1969 and 1973) and 2nd place 6 times. The club also won 1971 and 1973 Emperor's Cup. He retired in 1977. He played 136 games in the league. He was selected Best Eleven 7 times.

== National team career ==
In October 1964, when Yokoyama was a Rikkyo University student, he was selected Japan national team for 1964 Summer Olympics in Tokyo. At this competition, he debuted and played all matches on behalf of Tsukasa Hosaka fractured his hand just before Olympics. After that, Yokoyama became a regular goalkeeper at Japan national team. In 1968, he was selected Japan for 1968 Summer Olympics in Mexico City. He played all matches and Japan won bronze medal. In 2018, this team was selected Japan Football Hall of Fame. He also played at 1966, 1970 and 1974 Asian Games. He played 49 games for Japan until 1974.

== Coaching career ==
In 1976, when Yokoyama played for Mitsubishi Motors (later Urawa Reds), he became a playing manager as Hiroshi Ninomiya successor. In 1978, the club won all three major titles in Japan; Japan Soccer League, JSL Cup and Emperor's Cup. It was first domestic treble for a Japanese club. The club also won 1980 Emperor's Cup, 1981 JSL Cup and 1982 Japan Soccer League. He resigned in 1984. In 1988, he became a manager for Japan national team as Yoshinobu Ishii successor, where he coached Japan in the country's first competitive tournament, the 1988 AFC Asian Cup. At 1990 World Cup qualification in 1989, Japan lost in First round. Although Yokoyama managed at 1990 Asian Games, he resigned in 1991. In 1994, he became a manager for Urawa Reds as Takaji Mori successor. However, the club finished at the bottom in J1 League and he resigned end of season. In 1995, he became a general manager. From October 2000, he managed the club. In 2002, he resigned as general manager.

In 2005, Yokoyama was selected Japan Football Hall of Fame.

== Club statistics ==
Club performance			League	
Season	Club	League	Apps	Goals
Japan			League	
1966	Mitsubishi Motors	JSL Division 1	14	0
1967	Mitsubishi Motors	JSL Division 1	14	0
1968	Mitsubishi Motors	JSL Division 1	14	0
1969	Mitsubishi Motors	JSL Division 1	14	0
1970	Mitsubishi Motors	JSL Division 1	14	0
1971	Mitsubishi Motors	JSL Division 1	14	0
1972	Mitsubishi Motors	JSL Division 1	14	0
1973	Mitsubishi Motors	JSL Division 1	18	0
1974	Mitsubishi Motors	JSL Division 1	18	0
1975	Mitsubishi Motors	JSL Division 1	2	0
1976	Mitsubishi Motors	JSL Division 1	0	0
1977	Mitsubishi Motors	JSL Division 1	0	0
Total			136	0

== National team statistics ==
Japan national team
Year	Apps	Goals
1964	1	0
1965	4	0
1966	6	0
1967	5	0
1968	3	0
1969	3	0
1970	12	0
1971	6	0
1972	3	0
1973	2	0
1974	4	0
Total	49	0

== Managerial statistics ==
As of match played 17 December 2000

Managerial record by team and tenure
Team	Nat	From	To	Record				
Team	Nat	From	To	G	W	D	L	Win %
Japan	(Japan)	1 July 1988	30 June 1992	6	0	2	4	0.00
Urawa Red Diamonds	(Japan)	1 February 1994	31 January 1995	46	15	0	31	32.61
Urawa Red Diamonds	(Japan)	3 October 2000	31 January 2001	7	5	0	2	71.43
Career Total				59	20	2	37	33.90

== Awards ==
- Japan Soccer League Best Eleven: (7) 1966, 1967, 1968, 1969, 1971, 1973, 1974
- Japan Football Hall of Fame: Inducted in 2006
