= Akira Matsunaga (footballer, born 1948) =

Japanese footballer

Akira Matsunaga 松永 章
Personal information
- Full name: Akira Matsunaga
- Date of birth: August 8, 1948 (age 78)
- Place of birth: Shizuoka, Japan
- Height: 1.68 m (5 ft 6 in)
- Position: Forward

Youth career
- 1964–1966: Fujieda Higashi High School
- 1967–1970: Waseda University

Senior career*
Years	Team	Apps	(Gls)
1971–1982	Hitachi	176	(82)
Total		176	(82)

International career
1973–1976	Japan	10	(2)
Medal record
Hitachi
Winner	Japan Soccer League	1972
Runner-up	Japan Soccer League	1973
Runner-up	Japan Soccer League	1982
Winner	JSL Cup	1976
Runner-up	JSL Cup	1980
Winner	Emperor's Cup	1972
Winner	Emperor's Cup	1975
Runner-up	Emperor's Cup	1973
- * Club domestic league appearances and goals

Akira Matsunaga (松永 章, Matsunaga Akira; born August 8, 1948) is a former Japanese football player. He played for Japan national team.

== Club career ==
Matsunaga was born in Shizuoka Prefecture on August 8, 1948. After graduating from Waseda University, he joined Hitachi in 1971. In 1972, the club won the champions in Japan Soccer League and Emperor's Cup. The club also won 1975 Emperor's Cup and 1976 JSL Cup. He scored many goals in early 1970s and competed with Kunishige Kamamoto for top scorer. Matsunaga retired in 1982. He played 176 games and scored 82 goals in the league and became a top scorer in 1972 and 1973. He was also selected Best Eleven for 4 years in a row (1972-1975).

== National team career ==
In May 1973, Matsunaga was selected Japan national team for 1974 World Cup qualification. At this qualification, on May 22, he debuted against Hong Kong. He also played at 1976 Summer Olympics qualification. This qualification was his last game for Japan. He played 10 games and scored 2 goals for Japan until 1976.

== Club statistics ==
Club performance			League	
Season	Club	League	Apps	Goals
Japan			League	
1971	Hitachi	JSL Division 1	11	4
1972	Hitachi	JSL Division 1	14	12
1973	Hitachi	JSL Division 1	18	11
1974	Hitachi	JSL Division 1	18	17
1975	Hitachi	JSL Division 1	18	15
1976	Hitachi	JSL Division 1	5	0
1977	Hitachi	JSL Division 1	15	4
1978	Hitachi	JSL Division 1	18	7
1979	Hitachi	JSL Division 1	18	2
1980	Hitachi	JSL Division 1	17	4
1981	Hitachi	JSL Division 1	16	4
1982	Hitachi	JSL Division 1	8	2
Total			176	82

== National team statistics ==
Japan national team
Year	Apps	Goals
1973	3	0
1974	0	0
1975	0	0
1976	7	2
Total	10	2

== Personal honors ==
- Japan Soccer League Division 1 Top Scorer - 1972, 1973
