= Yoshitada Yamaguchi =

Japanese footballer

Yoshitada Yamaguchi 山口 芳忠
Personal information
- Full name: Yoshitada Yamaguchi
- Date of birth: September 28, 1944 (age 82)
- Place of birth: Fujieda, Shizuoka, Empire of Japan
- Height: 1.67 m (5 ft 6 in)
- Position: Defender

Youth career
- 1960–1962: Fujieda Higashi High School

College career
Years	Team	Apps	(Gls)
1963–1966	Chuo University		

Senior career*
Years	Team	Apps	(Gls)
1967–1975	Hitachi	121	(15)
Total		121	(15)

International career
1964–1973	Japan	49	(0)

Managerial career
- 1989–1992: Japan U-23
- 1993: Kashiwa Reysol
Medal record
Hitachi
Winner	Japan Soccer League	1972
Runner-up	Japan Soccer League	1973
Winner	Emperor's Cup	1972
Winner	Emperor's Cup	1975
Runner-up	Emperor's Cup	1973
Representing Japan
Olympic Games
Bronze medal – third place	1968 Mexico City	Team
Asian Games
Bronze medal – third place	1966 Bangkok	Team
- * Club domestic league appearances and goals

Yoshitada Yamaguchi (山口 芳忠, Yamaguchi Yoshitada; born September 28, 1944) is a former Japanese football player. He played for Japan national team.

== Club career ==
Yamaguchi was born in Fujieda on September 28, 1944. After graduating from Chuo University, he joined Hitachi (later Kashiwa Reysol) in 1967. In 1972, the club won the champions at Japan Soccer League and Emperor's Cup. The club also won 1975 Emperor's Cup. He retired in 1975. He played 121 games and scored 15 goals in the league. He was selected Best Eleven for 7 years in a row (1968-1974).

== National team career ==
In October 1964, he Yamaguchi selected Japan national team for 1964 Summer Olympics in Tokyo. At this competition, he debuted and played all matches. In 1968, he was also selected Japan for 1968 Summer Olympics in Mexico City. He played 5 matches and Japan won bronze medal. In 2018, this team was selected Japan Football Hall of Fame. He also played at 1966 and 1970 Asian Games. He played 49 games for Japan until 1973.

== Coaching career ==
After retirement, Yamaguchi became a manager for Japan U-23 football team for 1992 Summer Olympics. However, at 1992 Summer Olympics qualification, following Japan's failure to qualify for 1992 Summer Olympics, Yamaguchi resigned. In 1993, he returned to Kashiwa Reysol and managed the club 1 season.

In 2007, Yamaguchi was selected Japan Football Hall of Fame.

== Club statistics ==
Appearances and goals by club, season and competition
Club	Season	League		
Club	Season	Division	Apps	Goals
Hitachi	1967	JSL Division 1	14	1
Hitachi	1968	JSL Division 1	14	2
Hitachi	1969	JSL Division 1	13	3
Hitachi	1970	JSL Division 1	14	2
Hitachi	1971	JSL Division 1	8	1
Hitachi	1972	JSL Division 1	14	2
Hitachi	1973	JSL Division 1	16	3
Hitachi	1974	JSL Division 1	16	1
Hitachi	1975	JSL Division 1	12	0
Career total			121	15

== National team statistics ==
Japan national team
Year	Apps	Goals
1964	1	0
1965	4	0
1966	7	0
1967	4	0
1968	3	0
1969	4	0
1970	12	0
1971	6	0
1972	5	0
1973	3	0
Total	49	0

== Awards ==
- Japan Soccer League Best Eleven: (7) 1968, 1969, 1970, 1971, 1972, 1973, 1974
- Japan Football Hall of Fame: Inducted in 2007
