= Hiroji Imamura =

Japanese footballer

Hiroji Imamura 今村 博治
Personal information
- Full name: Hiroji Imamura
- Date of birth: April 27, 1949 (age 77)
- Place of birth: Koka, Shiga, Japan
- Height: 1.67 m (5 ft 5 1/2 in)
- Position: Forward

Youth career
- 1965–1967: Koka High School

Senior career*
Years	Team	Apps	(Gls)
1968–1983	Yanmar Diesel	230	(60)
Total		230	(60)

International career
1976	Japan	4	(0)
Medal record
Yanmar Diesel
Winner	Japan Soccer League	1971
Winner	Japan Soccer League	1974
Winner	Japan Soccer League	1975
Winner	Japan Soccer League	1980
Runner-up	Japan Soccer League	1968
Runner-up	Japan Soccer League	1972
Runner-up	Japan Soccer League	1978
Winner	JSL Cup	1983
Runner-up	JSL Cup	1977
Runner-up	JSL Cup	1982
Winner	Emperor's Cup	1968
Winner	Emperor's Cup	1970
Winner	Emperor's Cup	1974
Runner-up	Emperor's Cup	1971
Runner-up	Emperor's Cup	1972
Runner-up	Emperor's Cup	1976
Runner-up	Emperor's Cup	1977
Runner-up	Emperor's Cup	1983
- * Club domestic league appearances and goals

Hiroji Imamura (今村 博治, Imamura Hiroji; born April 27, 1949) is a former Japanese football player. He played for Japan national team.

== Club career ==
Imamura was born in Koka on April 27, 1949. After graduating from high school, he joined Yanmar Diesel in 1968. He played as winger with Kunishige Kamamoto and assisted with many of his goals. The club won the league championship in 1971, 1974, 1975, and 1980. He retired in 1983. He played 230 games and scored 60 goals in the league.

== National team career ==
On August 8, 1976, Imamura debuted for Japan national team against India. He played 4 games for Japan in 1976.

== National team statistics ==
Japan national team
Year	Apps	Goals
1976	4	0
Total	4	0
