= List of winners of J2 League and predecessors =

Japanese League (2nd tier)
- Country: Japan
- Founded: 1972
- Number of teams: 20 (2025)
- Current champions: Mito HollyHock (2025)
- Most successful club: Hokkaido Consadole Sapporo (6 titles)

A national second tier of Japanese league football was first established in 1972, as the Japan Soccer League Second Division. In 1992, with the breakup of the JSL and restructuring of the top flight into the J.League, the (former) Japan Football League became the second tier. In 1999 the J.League has established a second division (officially known as J2 League).

== Japan Soccer League Second Division (1972–1992) ==
Numbers in parentheses indicate number of wins at the date.

| Season | Champions | Runners-up |
|---|---|---|
| 1972 | Toyota Motors | Tanabe Pharmaceuticals |
| 1973 | Eidai Industries | Kofu SC^{†} |
| 1974 | Yomiuri SC^{†} | Fujitsu^{†} |
| 1975 | Tanabe Pharmaceuticals^{†} | Yomiuri SC^{†} |
| 1976 | Fujitsu | Yomiuri SC^{†} |
| 1977 | Yomiuri SC (2) | Nissan Motors^{†} |
| 1978 | Honda Motors^{†} | Nissan Motors |
| 1979 | Toshiba Horikawacho^{†} | Yamaha Motors |
| 1980 | Honda Motors (2) | Fujitsu^{†} |
| 1981 | Nippon Kokan | Nissan Motors |
| 1982 | Yamaha Motors | Toshiba SC^{†} |
| 1983 | Nippon Kokan (2) | Sumitomo Metal Industries^{†} |
| 1984 | Sumitomo Metal Industries | ANA Yokohama |
| 1985 | Matsushita Electric | Mazda SC |
| 1986–87 | Sumitomo Metal Industries (2) | Toyota Motors |
| 1987–88 | ANA Yokohama | Matsushita Electric |
| 1988–89 | Toshiba SC (2) | Hitachi |
| 1989–90 | Mitsubishi Heavy Industries | Toyota Motors |
| 1990–91 | Hitachi | Mazda SC |
| 1991–92 | Fujita SC^{‡} | Sumitomo Metal Industries |

^{†} Not promoted to Division 1 due to losing promotion/relegation series
^{‡} Not promoted to the newly formed J.League

== (former) Japan Football League Division 1 (1992–1993) ==
An extra season of Japanese football was done by the Japan Football League in late 1992, as the top flight clubs were still re-organizing and adopting new identities before the J.League kicked off in 1993.

| Season | Champions | Runners-up |
|---|---|---|
| 1992 | Yamaha Motors^{†} (2) | Hitachi^{†} |
| 1993 | Shonan Bellmare (2) | Júbilo Iwata |

^{†} Not promoted to J.League

== (former) Japan Football League (1994–1998) ==
In 1994, the Japan Football League Division 2 was abolished.

| Season | Champions | Runners-up |
|---|---|---|
| 1994 | Cerezo Osaka | Kashiwa Reysol |
| 1995 | Fukuoka Blux | Kyoto Purple Sanga |
| 1996 | Honda Motors^{†} (3) | Vissel Kobe |
| 1997 | Consadole Sapporo (3) | Tokyo Gas^{†} |
| 1998 | Tokyo Gas^{†} | Kawasaki Frontale^{†} |

^{†} Not promoted to J.League (J1 after 1998)

== J2 League (1999–present) ==
From 1999 to 2014 the league was known as J.League Division 2.

| Season | Champions | Runners-up | Third place | Playoff winners |
|---|---|---|---|---|
| 1999 | Kawasaki Frontale (2) | FC Tokyo | Oita Trinita^{†} | |
| 2000 | Consadole Sapporo (4) | Urawa Red Diamonds | Oita Trinita^{†} | |
| 2001 | Kyoto Purple Sanga | Vegalta Sendai | Montedio Yamagata^{†} | |
| 2002 | Oita Trinita | Cerezo Osaka | Albirex Niigata^{†} | |
| 2003 | Albirex Niigata | Sanfrecce Hiroshima | Kawasaki Frontale^{†} | |
| 2004 | Kawasaki Frontale (3) | Omiya Ardija | Avispa Fukuoka^{‡} | |
| 2005 | Kyoto Purple Sanga (2) | Avispa Fukuoka | Ventforet Kofu | |
| 2006 | Yokohama FC | Kashiwa Reysol | Vissel Kobe | |
| 2007 | Consadole Sapporo (5) | Tokyo Verdy 1969 | Kyoto Sanga | |
| 2008 | Sanfrecce Hiroshima | Montedio Yamagata | Vegalta Sendai^{‡} | |
| 2009 | Vegalta Sendai | Cerezo Osaka | Shonan Bellmare | |
| 2010 | Kashiwa Reysol (2) | Ventforet Kofu | Avispa Fukuoka | |
| 2011 | FC Tokyo (2) | Sagan Tosu | Consadole Sapporo | |
| 2012 | Ventforet Kofu | Shonan Bellmare | Kyoto Sanga^{†} | Oita Trinita (6th) |
| 2013 | Gamba Osaka (2) | Vissel Kobe | Kyoto Sanga^{†} | Tokushima Vortis (4th) |
| 2014 | Shonan Bellmare (3) | Matsumoto Yamaga | JEF United Chiba^{†} | Montedio Yamagata (6th) |
| 2015 | Omiya Ardija | Júbilo Iwata | Avispa Fukuoka (3rd) | |
| 2016 | Consadole Sapporo (6) | Shimizu S-Pulse | Matsumoto Yamaga^{†} | Cerezo Osaka (4th) |
| 2017 | Shonan Bellmare (4) | V-Varen Nagasaki | Nagoya Grampus (3rd) | |
| 2018 | Matsumoto Yamaga | Oita Trinita | Yokohama FC^{†} | |
| 2019 | Kashiwa Reysol (3) | Yokohama FC | Omiya Ardija^{†} | |
| 2020 | Tokushima Vortis | Avispa Fukuoka | V-Varen Nagasaki^{†} | |
| 2021 | Júbilo Iwata (3) | Kyoto Sanga | Ventforet Kofu^{†} | |
| 2022 | Albirex Niigata (2) | Yokohama FC | Fagiano Okayama^{†} | |
| 2023 | Machida Zelvia | Júbilo Iwata | Tokyo Verdy (3rd) | |
| 2024 | Shimizu S-Pulse | Yokohama FC | V-Varen Nagasaki^{†} | Fagiano Okayama (5th) |
| 2025 | Mito HollyHock | V-Varen Nagasaki | JEF United Chiba (3rd) | |

^{†} Not promoted to J1
^{‡} Not promoted to J1 due to losing promotion/relegation series
For play-off winners, the number in parentheses indicates their position after the end of the season.

== Total wins ==
Clubs in bold compete in J2 as of 2026–27 season. Clubs in italic no longer exist.
Years in italic indicate seasons of amateur football (Japan Soccer League D2 and former Japan Football League).

| Club | Winners | Runners-up | Winning seasons | Runners-up seasons |
|---|---|---|---|---|
| **Consadole Sapporo** | 6 | 1 | 1979, 1988–89, 1997, 2000, 2007, 2016 | 1982 |
| **Shonan Bellmare** | 4 | 1 | 1991–92, 1993, 2014, 2017 | 2012 |
| Kashiwa Reysol | 3 | 4 | 1990–91, 2010, 2019 | 1988–89, 1992, 1994, 2006 |
| **Júbilo Iwata** | 3 | 4 | 1982, 1992, 2021 | 1979, 1993, 2015, 2023 |
| Kawasaki Frontale | 3 | 3 | 1976, 1999, 2004 | 1974, 1980, 1998 |
| Honda FC | 3 | 0 | 1978, 1980, 1996 | — |
| Tokyo Verdy | 2 | 3 | 1974, 1977 | 1975, 1976, 2007 |
| Kashima Antlers | 2 | 2 | 1984, 1986–87 | 1983, 1991–92 |
| FC Tokyo | 2 | 2 | 1998, 2011 | 1997, 1999 |
| Kyoto Sanga | 2 | 2 | 2001, 2005 | 1995, 2021 |
| Gamba Osaka | 2 | 1 | 1985, 2013 | 1987–88 |
| NKK SC | 2 | 0 | 1981, 1983 | — |
| **Albirex Niigata** | 2 | 0 | 2003, 2022 | — |
| Sanfrecce Hiroshima | 1 | 3 | 2008 | 1985, 1990–91, 2003 |
| **Yokohama FC** | 1 | 3 | 2006 | 2019, 2022, 2024 |
| Nagoya Grampus | 1 | 2 | 1972 | 1986–87, 1989–90 |
| Cerezo Osaka | 1 | 2 | 1994 | 2002, 2009 |
| **Ventforet Kofu** | 1 | 2 | 2012 | 1973, 2010 |
| Avispa Fukuoka | 1 | 2 | 1995 | 2005, 2020 |
| Tanabe Pharmaceuticals | 1 | 1 | 1975 | 1972 |
| Yokohama Flügels | 1 | 1 | 1987–88 | 1984 |
| Urawa Red Diamonds | 1 | 1 | 1989–90 | 2000 |
| **Vegalta Sendai** | 1 | 1 | 2009 | 2001 |
| **Omiya Ardija** | 1 | 1 | 2015 | 2004 |
| **Oita Trinita** | 1 | 1 | 2002 | 2018 |
| Matsumoto Yamaga | 1 | 1 | 2018 | 2014 |
| Shimizu S-Pulse | 1 | 1 | 2024 | 2016 |
| Eidai Industries | 1 | 0 | 1973 | — |
| **Tokushima Vortis** | 1 | 0 | 2020 | — |
| Machida Zelvia | 1 | 0 | 2023 | — |
| Mito HollyHock | 1 | 0 | 2025 | — |
| Yokohama F. Marinos | 0 | 3 | — | 1977, 1978, 1981 |
| Vissel Kobe | 0 | 2 | — | 1996, 2013 |
| V-Varen Nagasaki | 0 | 2 | — | 2017, 2025 |
| **Montedio Yamagata** | 0 | 1 | — | 2008 |
| **Sagan Tosu** | 0 | 1 | — | 2011 |

== See also ==
- Japan Soccer League
- Japan Football League (1992–1998)
- J2 League
- List of Japanese football champions
- List of winners of J3 League and predecessors

== Sources ==
- Contents of Domestic Competition of Football in Japan
