= Yoshikazu Nagai =

Japanese footballer (born 1952)

Yoshikazu Nagai 永井 良和
Personal information
- Full name: Yoshikazu Nagai
- Date of birth: April 16, 1952 (age 74)
- Place of birth: Saitama, Saitama, Japan
- Height: 1.69 m (5 ft 6 1/2 in)
- Position: Forward

Youth career
- 1968–1970: Urawa Minami High School

Senior career*
| Years | Team | Apps | (Gls) |
| 1971–1988 | Furukawa Electric | 272 | (63) |
| Total | | 272 | (63) |

International career
| 1971–1980 | Japan | 69 | (9) |

Managerial career
- 1989–1990: Japan U-20
- 1992–1993: JEF United Ichihara
- 1996: Fukushima FC
- 1998–2000: Albirex Niigata
- 2001: Yokohama FC
- 2006–2007: Urawa Reds Ladies
Medal record
Furukawa Electric
| Winner | Japan Soccer League | 1976 |
| Winner | Japan Soccer League | 1985/86 |
| Winner | JSL Cup | 1977 |
| Winner | JSL Cup | 1982 |
| Winner | JSL Cup | 1986 |
| Runner-up | JSL Cup | 1979 |
| Winner | Emperor's Cup | 1976 |
| Runner-up | Emperor's Cup | 1984 |
- * Club domestic league appearances and goals

Yoshikazu Nagai (永井 良和, Nagai Yoshikazu; born April 16, 1952) is a former Japanese football player. He played for Japan national team. His son Shunta Nagai is also a former footballer.

== Club career ==
Nagai was born in Saitama on April 16, 1952. After graduating from high school, he joined Furukawa Electric in 1971. The club won the league champions in 1976 and 1985–86. The club also won 1976 Emperor's Cup, 1977, 1982 and 1986 JSL Cup. He retired in 1988. He played 272 games and scored 63 goals in the league. It is the record for most appearances in Japan Soccer League Division 1. In 1976, he was selected Japanese Footballer of the Year awards. He was selected Best Eleven 5 times.

== National team career ==
On August 13, 1971, when Nagai was 19 years old, he debuted for Japan national team against Iceland. He also played at 1972 Summer Olympics qualification in 1971. Although, he did not play for Japan in 1972, he was selected Japan for 1974 World Cup qualification in 1973. He also played at 1974, 1978 Asian Games. In 1980, he was selected Japan for 1980 Summer Olympics qualification, Japan's failure to qualify for 1980 Summer Olympics. This qualification was his last game for Japan. He played 69 games and scored 9 goals for Japan until 1980.

== Coaching career ==
After retirement, Nagai became a coach for Furukawa Electric (later JEF United Ichihara) in 1988. In 1989, he became a manager for Japan U-20 national team. In 1992, he returned to JEF United Ichihara and managed until 1993. In 1996, he signed with Japan Football League (JFL) club Fukushima FC and managed in 1 season. In 1998, he signed with JFL club Albirex Niigata. The club joined new league J2 League in 1999. In 2001, he moved to Yokohama FC. In 2006, he signed with his local women's league club Urawa Reds Ladies.

In 2012, Nagai was selected Japan Football Hall of Fame.

== Club statistics ==
| Club performance | | | League | |
| Season | Club | League | Apps | Goals |
| Japan | | | League | |
|---|---|---|---|---|
| 1971 | Furukawa Electric | JSL Division 1 | 10 | 2 |
| 1972 | Furukawa Electric | JSL Division 1 | 10 | 0 |
| 1973 | Furukawa Electric | JSL Division 1 | 18 | 2 |
| 1974 | Furukawa Electric | JSL Division 1 | 18 | 5 |
| 1975 | Furukawa Electric | JSL Division 1 | 18 | 7 |
| 1976 | Furukawa Electric | JSL Division 1 | 18 | 5 |
| 1977 | Furukawa Electric | JSL Division 1 | 18 | 14 |
| 1978 | Furukawa Electric | JSL Division 1 | 18 | 1 |
| 1979 | Furukawa Electric | JSL Division 1 | 18 | 6 |
| 1980 | Furukawa Electric | JSL Division 1 | 17 | 3 |
| 1981 | Furukawa Electric | JSL Division 1 | 15 | 6 |
| 1982 | Furukawa Electric | JSL Division 1 | 10 | 1 |
| 1983 | Furukawa Electric | JSL Division 1 | 12 | 1 |
| 1984 | Furukawa Electric | JSL Division 1 | 14 | 5 |
| 1985/86 | Furukawa Electric | JSL Division 1 | 22 | 3 |
| 1986/87 | Furukawa Electric | JSL Division 1 | 14 | 0 |
| 1987/88 | Furukawa Electric | JSL Division 1 | 22 | 2 |
| Total | | | 272 | 63 |

== National team statistics ==
Japan national team
| Year | Apps | Goals |
|---|---|---|
| 1971 | 4 | 1 |
| 1972 | 0 | 0 |
| 1973 | 5 | 0 |
| 1974 | 4 | 1 |
| 1975 | 11 | 1 |
| 1976 | 17 | 2 |
| 1977 | 5 | 0 |
| 1978 | 12 | 1 |
| 1979 | 9 | 3 |
| 1980 | 2 | 0 |
| Total | 69 | 9 |

== Managerial statistics ==
| Team | From | To | Record | | | | |
| Team | From | To | G | W | D | L | Win % |
|---|---|---|---|---|---|---|---|
| JEF United Ichihara | 1993 | 1993 | 36 | 14 | 0 | 22 | 38.89 |
| Albirex Niigata | 1999 | 2000 | 76 | 35 | 7 | 34 | 46.05 |
| Yokohama FC | 2001 | 2001 | 31 | 11 | 1 | 19 | 35.48 |
| Total | | | 143 | 60 | 8 | 75 | 41.96 |

== Personal honors ==
- Japanese Footballer of the Year - 1976
- Japan Football Hall of Fame: Inducted in 2012
