= Mitsuhisa Taguchi =

Japanese footballer (1955–2019)

Mitsuhisa Taguchi 田口 光久

Personal information
- Full name: Mitsuhisa Taguchi
- Date of birth: February 14, 1955
- Place of birth: Kawabe, Akita, Japan
- Date of death: November 12, 2019 (aged 64)
- Place of death: Tokyo, Japan
- Height: 1.78 m (5 ft 10 in)
- Position: Goalkeeper

Youth career
- 1970–1972: Akita Shogyo High School

Senior career*
Years	Team	Apps	(Gls)
1973–1984	Mitsubishi Motors	161	(0)
Total		161	(0)

International career
1975–1984	Japan	59	(0)
Medal record
Mitsubishi Motors
Winner	Japan Soccer League	1973
Winner	Japan Soccer League	1978
Winner	Japan Soccer League	1982
Runner-up	Japan Soccer League	1974
Runner-up	Japan Soccer League	1975
Runner-up	Japan Soccer League	1976
Runner-up	Japan Soccer League	1977
Winner	JSL Cup	1978
Winner	JSL Cup	1981
Winner	Emperor's Cup	1973
Winner	Emperor's Cup	1978
Winner	Emperor's Cup	1980
Runner-up	Emperor's Cup	1979
- * Club domestic league appearances and goals

Mitsuhisa Taguchi (田口 光久, Taguchi Mitsuhisa; February 14, 1955 – November 12, 2019) was a Japanese footballer. A Japanese international, he spent his entire career with Mitsubishi Motors.

== Club career ==
Taguchi was born in Akita on February 14, 1955. After graduating from high school, he joined Mitsubishi Motors in 1973. In 1973, the club won the champions at Japan Soccer League and Emperor's Cup. In 1975, he debuted as a starting goalkeeper for Japan national team, replacing established starter Kenzo Yokoyama.

In 1978, he was part of one of the club's most successful seasons, winning the Japanese treble; Japan Soccer League, JSL Cup and Emperor's Cup. The club also won 1980 Emperor's Cup, 1981 JSL Cup and 1982 Japan Soccer League. He retired in 1984. He played 161 games in the league. He was selected Best Eleven 8 times included for 7 years in a row (1977-1983).

== National team career ==
On September 8, 1975, Taguchi debuted for Japan national team against South Korea. In 1977, he became a regular goalkeeper and played at 1978 World Cup qualification, 1978 Asian Games and 1980 Summer Olympics qualification. From 1982, he became a captain and played at 1982 Asian Games and 1984 Summer Olympics qualification. He played 59 games for Japan until 1984.

== Coaching career ==
Following his retirement from playing career, Taguchi worked as a coach for several high school teams, including those at Aomori Yamada High School and Kokusai Gakuin High School.

On November 12, 2019, Taguchi died of respiratory failure in Tokyo at the age of 64.

== Club statistics ==
Club performance			League	
Season	Club	League	Apps	Goals
Japan			League	
1973	Mitsubishi Motors	JSL Division 1	1	0
1974	Mitsubishi Motors	JSL Division 1	0	0
1975	Mitsubishi Motors	JSL Division 1	16	0
1976	Mitsubishi Motors	JSL Division 1	18	0
1977	Mitsubishi Motors	JSL Division 1	18	0
1978	Mitsubishi Motors	JSL Division 1	18	0
1979	Mitsubishi Motors	JSL Division 1	18	0
1980	Mitsubishi Motors	JSL Division 1	18	0
1981	Mitsubishi Motors	JSL Division 1	18	0
1982	Mitsubishi Motors	JSL Division 1	18	0
1983	Mitsubishi Motors	JSL Division 1	18	0
1984	Mitsubishi Motors	JSL Division 1	0	0
Total			161	0

== National team statistics ==
Japan national team
Year	Apps	Goals
1975	1	0
1976	3	0
1977	5	0
1978	13	0
1979	8	0
1980	4	0
1981	4	0
1982	8	0
1983	9	0
1984	4	0
Total	59	0
