= Aritatsu Ogi =

Japanese footballer

Aritatsu Ogi 小城 得達
Personal information
- Full name: Aritatsu Ogi
- Date of birth: December 10, 1942 (age 83)
- Place of birth: Hiroshima, Hiroshima, Empire of Japan
- Height: 1.77 m (5 ft 9 1/2 in)
- Position: Midfielder

Youth career
- 1958–1960: Hiroshima University High School

College career
| Years | Team | Apps | (Gls) |
| 1961–1964 | Chuo University | | |

Senior career*
| Years | Team | Apps | (Gls) |
| 1965–1976 | Toyo Industries | 163 | (57) |
| Total | | 163 | (57) |

International career
| 1963–1976 | Japan | 62 | (11) |

Managerial career
- 1977–1980: Toyo Industries
Medal record
Chuo University
| Winner | Emperor's Cup | 1962 |
Toyo Industries
| Winner | Japan Soccer League | 1965 |
| Winner | Japan Soccer League | 1966 |
| Winner | Japan Soccer League | 1967 |
| Winner | Japan Soccer League | 1968 |
| Winner | Japan Soccer League | 1970 |
| Runner-up | Japan Soccer League | 1969 |
| Winner | Emperor's Cup | 1965 |
| Winner | Emperor's Cup | 1967 |
| Winner | Emperor's Cup | 1969 |
| Runner-up | Emperor's Cup | 1966 |
| Runner-up | Emperor's Cup | 1970 |
Representing Japan
Olympic Games
| Bronze medal – third place | 1968 Mexico City | Team |
Asian Games
| Bronze medal – third place | 1966 Bangkok | Team |
- * Club domestic league appearances and goals

Aritatsu Ogi (小城 得達, Ogi Aritatsu; born December 10, 1942) is a former Japanese football player. He played for Japan national team.

== Club career ==
Ogi was born in Hiroshima on December 10, 1942. After graduating from Chuo University, he joined his local club Toyo Industries in 1965. The club won the champions 5 times (1965, 1966, 1967, 1968 and 1970). He became a top scorer in 1966 and was selected Best Eleven for 7 years in a row (1966-1972). He was also selected Japanese Footballer of the Year awards in 1965 and 1970. He retired in 1976. He played 163 games and scored 57 goals in the league.

== National team career ==
On August 8, 1963, when Ogi was a Chuo University student, he debuted for Japan national team against Malaysia. He was selected for Japan for 1964 Summer Olympics in Tokyo and 1968 Summer Olympics in Mexico City. He played all matches in both Olympics. At 1964 Olympics, he scored winning goal against Argentina in first match. At 1968 Olympics, Japan won Bronze Medal. In 2018, this team was selected Japan Football Hall of Fame. He also played at 1966, 1970 and 1974 Asian Games. He played 62 games and scored 11 goals for Japan until 1976.

== Coaching career ==
After retirement, Ogi became a manager for Toyo Industries in 1977 as Ikuo Matsumoto successor. He managed until 1980.

In 2006, he was selected Japan Football Hall of Fame.

== Club statistics ==
| Club performance | | | League | |
| Season | Club | League | Apps | Goals |
| Japan | | | League | |
|---|---|---|---|---|
| 1965 | Toyo Industries | JSL Division 1 | 14 | 9 |
| 1966 | Toyo Industries | JSL Division 1 | 14 | 14 |
| 1967 | Toyo Industries | JSL Division 1 | 12 | 5 |
| 1968 | Toyo Industries | JSL Division 1 | 14 | 5 |
| 1969 | Toyo Industries | JSL Division 1 | 13 | 6 |
| 1970 | Toyo Industries | JSL Division 1 | 14 | 2 |
| 1971 | Toyo Industries | JSL Division 1 | 14 | 1 |
| 1972 | Toyo Industries | JSL Division 1 | 14 | 4 |
| 1973 | Toyo Industries | JSL Division 1 | 18 | 4 |
| 1974 | Toyo Industries | JSL Division 1 | 9 | 1 |
| 1975 | Toyo Industries | JSL Division 1 | 18 | 5 |
| 1976 | Toyo Industries | JSL Division 1 | 9 | 1 |
| Total | | | 163 | 57 |

== National team statistics ==
Japan national team
| Year | Apps | Goals |
|---|---|---|
| 1963 | 1 | 0 |
| 1964 | 1 | 0 |
| 1965 | 2 | 0 |
| 1966 | 7 | 2 |
| 1967 | 5 | 3 |
| 1968 | 3 | 0 |
| 1969 | 4 | 0 |
| 1970 | 13 | 2 |
| 1971 | 5 | 2 |
| 1972 | 8 | 2 |
| 1973 | 5 | 0 |
| 1974 | 6 | 0 |
| 1975 | 0 | 0 |
| 1976 | 2 | 0 |
| Total | 62 | 11 |

== Awards ==
- Japanese Player of the Year: 1965
- Japan Soccer League Top Scorer: 1966
- Japan Soccer League Best Eleven: 1966, 1967, 1968, 1969, 1970, 1971, 1972
- Asian All Stars: 1967, 1968
- Japan Football Hall of Fame: Inducted in 2006
- Order of the Rising Sun, 5th Class, Gold and Silver Rays: 2017
