= Yasuhiko Okudera =

Japanese footballer (born 1952)

Yasuhiko Okudera 奥寺 康彦
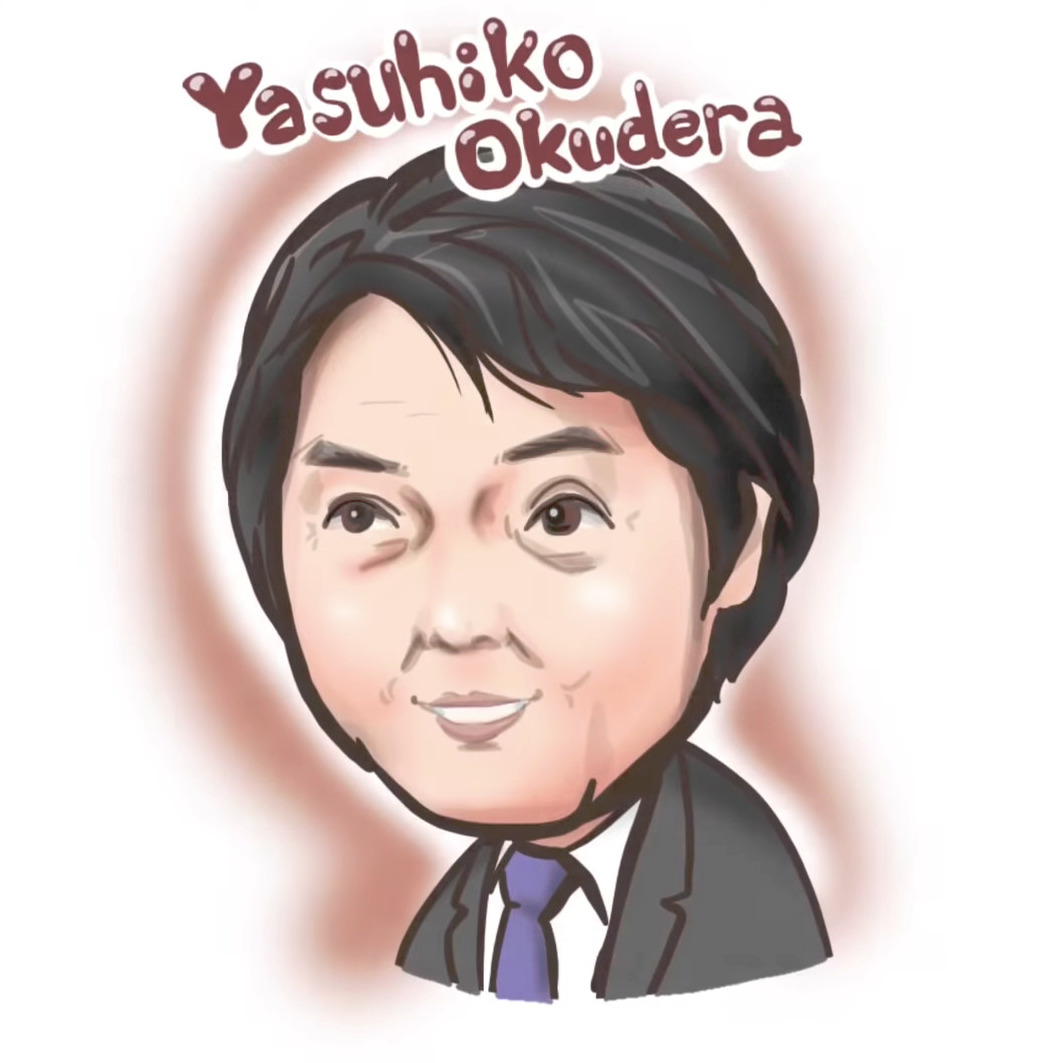

Personal information
- Date of birth: 12 March 1952 (age 74)
- Place of birth: Kazuno, Akita, Japan
- Height: 1.77 m (5 ft 10 in)
- Position: Midfielder

Youth career
- 1967–1969: Sagami Institute of Technology High School

Senior career*
Years	Team	Apps	(Gls)
1970–1977	Furukawa Electric	100	(36)
1977–1980	1. FC Köln	75	(15)
1980–1981	Hertha BSC	25	(8)
1981–1986	Werder Bremen	159	(11)
1986–1988	Furukawa Electric	43	(3)
Total		402	(73)

International career
1972–1987	Japan	32	(9)

Managerial career
- 1996: JEF United Ichihara
- 2017: Yokohama FC
Medal record
Furukawa Electric
Winner	Japan Soccer League	1976
Winner	JSL Cup	1977
Winner	JSL Cup	1986
Winner	Emperor's Cup	1976
- * Club domestic league appearances and goals

Yasuhiko Okudera (奥寺 康彦, Okudera Yasuhiko; born 12 March 1952) is a Japanese former football player and manager. A midfielder, Okudera was the first Japanese footballer to play professionally in Europe, as well as being the first Asian football player to score in the European Cup, while playing for 1. FC Köln in the 1979 semi-final match against Nottingham Forest and made 32 appearances – scoring nine goals – with the Japan national team.

== Club career ==
Okudera began his playing career in 1970 as an employee of Furukawa Electric, whose soccer team played in the corporate Japan Soccer League, the top flight league in Japan at the time. In 1976, the club won the 1976 Japan Soccer League and 1976 Emperor's Cup and he was selected Best Eleven. In May 1977, the club also won 1977 JSL Cup.

In the summer of 1977, during the team's trip to Germany, he was spotted by coach Hennes Weisweiler of Bundesliga club 1. FC Köln. After being offered a contract by Köln he joined the club in July 1977. Okudera made his debut on 5 October 1977, becoming the first Japanese player to play top flight football in Europe, and Köln won the Bundesliga title that year. On 20 December, he scored his first goal for Köln also achieving a brace in a 9–0 victory over Schwarz-Weiß Essen in the Quarter-final of the DFB-Pokal. On 8 April 1978, he scored his first goal in the Bundesliga in a 2–0 win against 1. FC Kaiserslautern. On 11 April 1979, Okudera scored a goal in a 3–3 draw against Nottingham Forest F.C. in the first leg of the semi-finals of the European Cup and he became the first Asian player to score in a European Cup match.

After Weisweiler left Cologne during the 1980–81 season, Okudera joined second division Hertha BSC. Hertha missed promotion to the first division losing a decisive match against Werder Bremen. He then joined the newly promoted Werder Bremen, whose coach Otto Rehhagel saw his play when the two sides met and offered a contract. Under Rehhagel, he started playing as an attacking full-back instead of as a winger and finished second in the league three times between 1981–82 and 1985–86 with Bremen.

In the summer of 1986, Okudera returned to his old Japanese club, Furukuwa Electric and became one of the first recognized professional players in JSL. On 26 December 1986, he scored a hat-trick in a 4–3 win over Al Hilal in the final round of the Asian Club Championship. He ended his German career with 234 appearances and 26 goals. He retired as a player in 1988.

== International career ==
On 12 July 1972, Okudera debuted for Japan national team against Khmer. He played at 1976 Asian Cup qualification and 1978 World Cup qualification until 1977. While he played in Germany, he was not selected Japan national team from 1977 to 1986. In September 1986, when he was 34 years old, he returned to Japan and was selected Japan for 1986 Asian Games. In 1987, he also played at 1988 Summer Olympics qualification. This qualification was his last game for Japan. He played 32 games and scored 9 goals for Japan until 1987.

== Post-playing career ==
Okudera's return home spurred the professionalization of the Japanese game, which had been stuck in amateur play for decades. He was the first native-born professional player in his home league, as before only foreigners (usually Brazilians) were paid strictly to play football by the companies.

After the J1 League started play in 1993, he served as the president and manager of Furukawa, which had become JEF United Ichihara with limited success. In 1998, he joined his Köln teammate Pierre Littbarski and helped form Yokohama FC. With Okudera as president and Littbarski the manager, Yokohama climbed up the ranks from the lower-tier Japan Football League and promoted to the J1 League in December 2006.

On 5 December 2003, Okudera and former South Korean star Cha Bum-kun were the Asian representatives at the preliminary draw, which determined the groupings for the qualifying matches for the 2006 World Cup.

On 20 June 2008, Okudera was appointed President of the Football League Championship side Plymouth Argyle tasked with playing a global ambassador role and further strengthening the club's profile in Asia. Since this appointment Argyle have suffered a relegation and serious financial difficulties. Okudera was replaced in his role by former Fans Trust leader Chris Webb, who had played a key part in rescuing Argyle from liquidation.

Okudera was selected Japan Football Hall of Fame in 2012 and Asian Football Hall of Fame in 2014.

In October 2017, Yokohama FC manager Hitoshi Nakata was sacked, Okudera managed the club as caretaker.

== Career statistics ==
=== Club ===
Appearances and goals by club, season and competition
Club	Season	League			National Cup		League Cup		Continental		Total	
Club	Season	Division	Apps	Goals	Apps	Goals	Apps	Goals	Apps	Goals	Apps	Goals
Furukawa Electric	1970	JSL Division 1	7	3								
Furukawa Electric	1971	JSL Division 1	9	5								
Furukawa Electric	1972	JSL Division 1	8	0								
Furukawa Electric	1973	JSL Division 1	18	6								
Furukawa Electric	1974	JSL Division 1	18	5								
Furukawa Electric	1975	JSL Division 1	18	9								
Furukawa Electric	1976	JSL Division 1	18	8								
Furukawa Electric	1977	JSL Division 1	4	0								
Furukawa Electric	Total		100	36								
1. FC Köln	1977–78	Bundesliga	20	4	4	2					24	6
1. FC Köln	1978–79	Bundesliga	24	5	3	1			2	1	29	7
1. FC Köln	1979–80	Bundesliga	30	6	8	1					38	7
1. FC Köln	1980–81	Bundesliga	1	0	1	0			1	1	3	1
1. FC Köln	Total		75	15	16	4			3	2	94	21
Hertha BSC	1980–81	2. Bundesliga	25	8	4	0					29	8
Werder Bremen	1981–82	Bundesliga	30	2	4	0					34	2
Werder Bremen	1982–83	Bundesliga	34	4	2	0			6	1	42	5
Werder Bremen	1983–84	Bundesliga	29	1	4	0			4	0	37	1
Werder Bremen	1984–85	Bundesliga	33	3	4	0			2	0	39	3
Werder Bremen	1985–86	Bundesliga	33	1	3	0			2	0	38	1
Werder Bremen	Total		159	11	17	0			14	1	190	12
Furukawa Electric	1986–87	JSL Division 1	21	2								
Furukawa Electric	1987–88	JSL Division 1	22	1								
Furukawa Electric	Total		43	3								
Career total			402	73								

=== International ===
Appearances and goals by national team and year
National team	Year	Apps	Goals
Japan	1972	6	1
Japan	1973	0	0
Japan	1974	0	0
Japan	1975	5	0
Japan	1976	8	7
Japan	1977	4	0
Japan	1978	0	0
Japan	1979	0	0
Japan	1980	0	0
Japan	1981	0	0
Japan	1982	0	0
Japan	1983	0	0
Japan	1984	0	0
Japan	1985	0	0
Japan	1986	4	0
Japan	1987	5	1
Total		32	9

== Managerial statistics ==
Team	From	To	Record				
Team	From	To	G	W	D	L	Win %
JEF United Ichihara	1996	1996	30	13	0	17	43.33
Yokohama FC	2017	2017	1	0	1	0	0.00
Total			31	13	1	17	41.94

== Honours ==
Furukawa Electric

- Japan Soccer League: 1976
- Emperor's Cup: 1976
- Japanese Super Cup: 1977
- Asian Club Championship: 1986–87

1. FC Köln

- European Cup Semi-finals: 1978–79
- Bundesliga: 1977–78
- DFB-Pokal: 1977–78; runner-up: 1979–80

Werder Bremen

- Bundesliga runner-up: 1982–83, 1984–85, 1985–86

Japan

- Pestabola Merdeka runner-up: 1976

Individual

- Japan Soccer League Best Eleven: 1976, 1986–87
- Japan Football Hall of Fame: 2012
- Asian Football Hall of Fame: 2014
- IFFHS Asian Men's Team of All Time: 2021
