= Takaji Mori =

Japanese footballer and manager

Takaji Mori 森 孝慈
Personal information
- Full name: Takaji Mori
- Date of birth: November 24, 1943
- Place of birth: Fukuyama, Hiroshima, Empire of Japan
- Date of death: July 17, 2011 (aged 67)
- Place of death: Meguro, Tokyo, Japan
- Height: 1.73 m (5 ft 8 in)
- Positions: Defender; midfielder

Youth career
- 1959–1961: Shudo High School

College career
Years	Team	Apps	(Gls)
1962–1966	Waseda University		

Senior career*
Years	Team	Apps	(Gls)
1967–1977	Mitsubishi Motors	146	(28)
Total		146	(28)

International career
1966–1976	Japan	56	(2)

Managerial career
- 1981–1985: Japan
- 1992–1993: Urawa Reds
- 1998: Avispa Fukuoka
Medal record
Mitsubishi Motors
Winner	Japan Soccer League	1969
Winner	Japan Soccer League	1973
Runner-up	Japan Soccer League	1970
Runner-up	Japan Soccer League	1971
Runner-up	Japan Soccer League	1974
Runner-up	Japan Soccer League	1975
Runner-up	Japan Soccer League	1976
Runner-up	Japan Soccer League	1977
Winner	Emperor's Cup	1971
Winner	Emperor's Cup	1973
Runner-up	Emperor's Cup	1967
Runner-up	Emperor's Cup	1968
Representing Japan
Olympic Games
Bronze medal – third place	1968 Mexico City	Team
Asian Games
Bronze medal – third place	1966 Bangkok	Team
- * Club domestic league appearances and goals

Takaji Mori (森 孝慈, Mori Takaji; November 24, 1943 – July 17, 2011) was a Japanese football player and manager. He played for Japan national team.

== Club career ==
Mori was born in Fukuyama on November 24, 1943. He played for Waseda University. He won 1963 and 1966 Emperor's Cup at university. After graduating from Waseda University, he joined Mitsubishi Motors (later Urawa Reds) in 1967. The club won the league champions in 1969 and 1973. The club also won 1971 and 1973 Emperor's Cup. He retired in 1977. He played 146 games and scored 28 goals in the league. He was selected Best Eleven 5 times.

== National team career ==
In October 1964, when Mori was a Waseda University student, he was selected Japan national team for 1964 Summer Olympics in Tokyo. But he did not play in the match. On December 16, 1966, he debuted against Singapore at 1966 Asian Games. In 1968, he was selected Japan for 1968 Summer Olympics in Mexico City. He played in all matches and Japan won bronze medal. In 2018, this team was selected Japan Football Hall of Fame. In 1970, he also played at 1970 Asian Games. He played 56 games and scored 2 goals for Japan until 1976.

== Coaching career ==
After retirement, in November 1980, Mori became a coach for Japan national team under new manager Saburo Kawabuchi. Mori was promoted to manager in April 1981. He managed at 1982 Asian Games and 1984 Summer Olympics qualification. At 1986 World Cup qualification in 1985, Japan defeated Singapore, North Korea and Hong Kong to reach the final round of the East Asian zone to play South Korea. Japan lost 1–3 on aggregate. Mori then led the team to the 1986 Asian Games in Seoul and resigned following the team's failure to reach the second round. In 1992, Mori became a manager for Urawa Reds. However, Urawa Reds finished at the bottom place in J1 League first season and he resigned. In 1998, he signed with Avispa Fukuoka and he managed the club in 1 season.

In 2006, Mori was selected to the Japan Football Hall of Fame. On July 17, 2011, he died of renal pelvis cancer in Meguro, Tokyo at the age of 67. That day was the day Japan women's national team won 2011 Women's World Cup, Japan won the world champions for the first time through men and women.

== Club statistics ==
Club performance			League	
Season	Club	League	Apps	Goals
Japan			League	
1967	Mitsubishi Motors	JSL Division 1	14	3
1968	Mitsubishi Motors	JSL Division 1	14	3
1969	Mitsubishi Motors	JSL Division 1	14	2
1970	Mitsubishi Motors	JSL Division 1	14	6
1971	Mitsubishi Motors	JSL Division 1	10	1
1972	Mitsubishi Motors	JSL Division 1	14	0
1973	Mitsubishi Motors	JSL Division 1	18	1
1974	Mitsubishi Motors	JSL Division 1	18	8
1975	Mitsubishi Motors	JSL Division 1	12	4
1976	Mitsubishi Motors	JSL Division 1	18	0
1977	Mitsubishi Motors	JSL Division 1	0	0
Total			146	28

== National team statistics ==
Japan national team
Year	Apps	Goals
1966	4	0
1967	5	1
1968	4	0
1969	4	0
1970	13	0
1971	3	0
1972	8	0
1973	1	1
1974	1	0
1975	9	0
1976	4	0
Total	56	2

== Managerial statistics ==
As of match played 5 December 1998

Managerial record by team and tenure
Team	Nat	From	To	Record				
Team	Nat	From	To	G	W	D	L	Win %
Japan	(Japan)	1 April 1981	31 December 1985	5	0	0	5	0.00
Urawa Red Diamonds	(Japan)	1 July 1992	31 January 1994	50	14	0	36	28.00
Avispa Fukuoka	(Japan)	1 February 1998	31 January 1999	43	12	1	30	27.91
Career Total				98	26	1	71	26.53

== Awards ==
- Japan Soccer League Best Eleven: (5) 1969, 1970, 1973, 1974, 1975
- Japan Football Hall of Fame: Inducted in 2006
