= Masaki Yokotani =

Japanese footballer

Masaki Yokotani 横谷 政樹
Personal information
- Full name: Masaki Yokotani
- Date of birth: May 10, 1952 (age 74)
- Place of birth: Kyoto, Japan
- Height: 1.71 m (5 ft 7 1/2 in)
- Position: Defender

Youth career
- 1968–1970: Kyoto Commercial High School
- 1971–1974: Hosei University

Senior career*
| Years | Team | Apps | (Gls) |
| 1975–1983 | Hitachi | 124 | (2) |
| 1984–1986 | All Nippon Airways | | |
| Total | | 124 | (2) |

International career
| 1974–1977 | Japan | 20 | (0) |
Medal record
Hitachi
| Runner-up | Japan Soccer League | 1982 |
| Winner | JSL Cup | 1976 |
| Runner-up | JSL Cup | 1980 |
| Winner | Emperor's Cup | 1975 |
- * Club domestic league appearances and goals

Masaki Yokotani (横谷 政樹, Yokotani Masaki; born May 10, 1952) is a former Japanese football player. He played for Japan national team.

== Club career ==
Yokotani was born in Kyoto Prefecture on May 10, 1952. After graduating from Hosei University, he joined Hitachi in 1975. The club won 1975 Emperor's Cup and 1976 JSL Cup. He moved to Division 2 club All Nippon Airways in 1984. In 1984, the club was promoted to Division 1. He retired in 1986.

== National team career ==
On July 23, 1974, when Yokotani was a Hosei University student, he debuted for Japan national team against Romania. He also played at 1976 Asian Cup qualification and 1978 World Cup qualification. He played 20 games for Japan until 1977.

== Club statistics ==
| Club performance | | | League | |
| Season | Club | League | Apps | Goals |
| Japan | | | League | |
|---|---|---|---|---|
| 1975 | Hitachi | JSL Division 1 | 18 | 1 |
| 1976 | Hitachi | JSL Division 1 | 18 | 0 |
| 1977 | Hitachi | JSL Division 1 | 18 | 0 |
| 1978 | Hitachi | JSL Division 1 | 15 | 1 |
| 1979 | Hitachi | JSL Division 1 | 17 | 0 |
| 1980 | Hitachi | JSL Division 1 | 0 | 0 |
| 1981 | Hitachi | JSL Division 1 | 14 | 0 |
| 1982 | Hitachi | JSL Division 1 | 15 | 0 |
| 1983 | Hitachi | JSL Division 1 | 9 | 0 |
| 1984 | All Nippon Airways | JSL Division 2 | | |
| 1985/86 | All Nippon Airways | JSL Division 1 | 1 | 0 |
| Total | | | 125 | 2 |

== National team statistics ==
Japan national team
| Year | Apps | Goals |
|---|---|---|
| 1974 | 1 | 0 |
| 1975 | 10 | 0 |
| 1976 | 6 | 0 |
| 1977 | 3 | 0 |
| Total | 20 | 0 |
