= 1976 JSL Cup final =

Hitachi	Eidai
1	0
- Date: May 14, 1976
- Venue: National Stadium, Tokyo

1976 JSL Cup final was the first final of the JSL Cup competition. The final was played at National Stadium in Tokyo on May 14, 1976. Hitachi won the championship.

== Overview ==
Hitachi won their 1st title, by defeating Eidai 1–0.

== Match details ==
May 14, 1976

Hitachi	1-0	Eidai
? (?)

National Stadium

== See also ==
- 1976 JSL Cup
