= Hiroyuki Usui =

Japanese footballer and manager

Hiroyuki Usui 碓井 博行
Personal information
- Full name: Hiroyuki Usui
- Date of birth: August 4, 1953 (age 73)
- Place of birth: Fujieda, Shizuoka, Japan
- Height: 1.78 m (5 ft 10 in)
- Position: Forward

Youth career
- 1969–1971: Fujieda Higashi High School

College career
Years	Team	Apps	(Gls)
1972–1975	Waseda University		

Senior career*
Years	Team	Apps	(Gls)
1976–1988	Hitachi		

International career
1974–1984	Japan	38	(15)

Managerial career
- 1989–1992: Hitachi
Medal record
Hitachi
Runner-up	Japan Soccer League	1982
Winner	JSL Cup	1976
Runner-up	JSL Cup	1980
Representing Japan
AFC U-19 Championship
Silver medal – second place	1973 Iran
- * Club domestic league appearances and goals

Hiroyuki Usui (碓井 博行, Usui Hiroyuki; born August 4, 1953) is a former Japanese football player and manager. He played for Japan national team. His son Kempei Usui is also a footballer.

== Club career ==
Usui was born in Fujieda on August 4, 1953. After graduating from Waseda University, he joined Hitachi in 1976. The club won 1976 JSL Cup. He became a top scorer and was selected Best Eleven in 1980 and 1982. He retired in 1988. He played 200 games and scored 85 goals in the Division 1.

== National team career ==
On February 12, 1974, Usui debuted for Japan national team against Singapore. In 1977, he was selected Japan for 1978 World Cup qualification. He also played at 1978 Asian Games. Although he was not selected Japan after 1980 Summer Olympics qualification, he was selected in 1984 and played at 1984 Summer Olympics qualification. This qualification was his last game for Japan. He played 38 games and scored 15 goals for Japan until 1984.

== Coaching career ==
After retirement, Usui became a manager for Hitachi in 1989. Although the club finished at the bottom place in 1989–90 season and was relegated to Division 2, the club won the champions in Division 2 in 1990–91 season and was promoted to Division 1. He resigned in 1992.

== Career statistics ==
=== Club ===
Club performance			League	
Season	Club	League	Apps	Goals
Japan			League	
1976	Hitachi	JSL Division 1	18	13
1977	Hitachi	JSL Division 1	18	8
1978	Hitachi	JSL Division 1	14	7
1979	Hitachi	JSL Division 1	18	11
1980	Hitachi	JSL Division 1	18	14
1981	Hitachi	JSL Division 1	18	8
1982	Hitachi	JSL Division 1	18	13
1983	Hitachi	JSL Division 1	17	3
1984	Hitachi	JSL Division 1	17	1
1985/86	Hitachi	JSL Division 1	22	5
1986/87	Hitachi	JSL Division 1	22	2
1987/88	Hitachi	JSL Division 2		
Total			200	85

=== International ===
Appearances and goals by national team and year
National team	Year	Apps	Goals
Japan	1974	2	0
Japan	1975	0	0
Japan	1976	1	0
Japan	1977	4	0
Japan	1978	14	7
Japan	1979	9	3
Japan	1980	5	3
Japan	1981	0	0
Japan	1982	0	0
Japan	1983	0	0
Japan	1984	3	2
Total		38	15

Scores and results list Japan's goal tally first, score column indicates score after each Usui goal.

List of international goals scored by Hiroyuki Usui
No.	Date	Venue	Opponent	Score	Result	Competition
1	23 May 1978	Mizuho Stadium, Nagoya, Japan	Thailand	2–0	3–0	1978 Kirin Cup
2	17 July 1978	Merdeka Stadium, Kuala Lumpur, Malaysia	Syria	1–0	3–2	1978 Merdeka Tournament
3	17 July 1978	Merdeka Stadium, Kuala Lumpur, Malaysia	Syria	2–0	3–2	1978 Merdeka Tournament
4	23 July 1978	Merdeka Stadium, Kuala Lumpur, Malaysia	Singapore	1–0	1–2	1978 Merdeka Tournament
5	26 July 1978	Merdeka Stadium, Kuala Lumpur, Malaysia	Thailand	3–0	4–0	1978 Merdeka Stadium
6	13 December 1978	Suphachalasai Stadium, Bangkok, Thailand	Bahrain	1–0	4–0	1978 Asian Games
7	13 December 1978	Suphachalasai Stadium, Bangkok, Thailand	Bahrain	2–0	4–0	1978 Asian Games
8	4 March 1979	National Stadium, Tokyo, Japan	South Korea	1–0	2–1	Friendly
9	27 June 1979	Merdeka Stadium, Kuala Lumpur, Malaysia	Thailand	2–0	2–0	1979 Merdeka Tournament
10	13 July 1979	Merdeka Stadium, Kuala Lumpur, Malaysia	Singapore	1–0	3–1	1979 Merdeka Tournament
11	24 March 1980	Merdeka Stadium, Kuala Lumpur, Malaysia	Philippines	5–0	10–0	1980 Summer Olympics qualification
12	30 March 1980	Merdeka Stadium, Kuala Lumpur, Malaysia	Malaysia	1–1	1–1	1980 Summer Olympics qualification
13	2 April 1980	Merdeka Stadium, Kuala Lumpur, Malaysia	Brunei	1–1	2–1	1980 Summer Olympics qualification
14	24 March 1984	Hassanal Bolkiah National Stadium, Bandar Seri Begawan, Brunei	Brunei	?–?	7–1	Friendly
15	24 March 1984	Hassanal Bolkiah National Stadium, Bandar Seri Begawan, Brunei	Brunei	?–?	7–1	Friendly

== Personal honors ==
- Japan Soccer League First Division Top Scorer - 1980, 1982
