= Yokotani =

Yokotani is a surname. Notable people with the surname include:

- Masahiro Yokotani (born 1964), Japanese screenwriter
- Masaki Yokotani (born 1952), Japanese footballer
- Shigeru Yokotani (born 1987), Japanese footballer

== See also ==
- Yoko Tani
