= Akira Matsunaga =

Akira Matsunaga may refer to:

- Akira Matsunaga (footballer, born 1914) (松永 行), Japanese footballer
- Akira Matsunaga (footballer, born 1948) (松永 章), Japanese footballer
