= Mitsuhisa =

- Gender: Male

Origin
- Origin: Japanese
- Meaning: Different meanings depending on the kanji used

Mitsuhisa (written: 光久) is a masculine Japanese given name. Notable people with the name include:

- Mitsuhisa Ishikawa (石川 光久; born 1958), Japanese anime producer
- Mitsuhisa Sunabe (砂辺 光久; born 1979), Japanese mixed martial artist
- Mitsuhisa Taguchi (田口 光久; 1955–2019), Japanese footballer
