= Kempei Usui =

Japanese footballer

Kempei Usui 碓井 健平
Personal information
- Full name: Kempei Usui
- Date of birth: May 15, 1987 (age 39)
- Place of birth: Kashiwa, Chiba, Japan
- Height: 1.81 m (5 ft 11 1/2 in)
- Position: Goalkeeper

Youth career
- 2006–2009: Tsukuba University

Senior career*
| Years | Team | Apps | (Gls) |
| 2010–2012 | Shimizu S-Pulse | 14 | (0) |
| 2013–2014 | JEF United Chiba | 0 | (0) |
| 2015–2017 | Shimizu S-Pulse | 3 | (0) |
| 2017 | → Machida Zelvia (loan) | 0 | (0) |
| 2018–2019 | Okinawa SV | 32 | (0) |
Medal record
Shimizu S-Pulse
| Runner-up | J.League Cup | 2012 |
| Runner-up | Emperor's Cup | 2010 |
- * Club domestic league appearances and goals as of 23 February 2020

Kempei Usui (碓井 健平, born May 15, 1987) is a former Japanese footballer who last played as a goalkeeper for Okinawa SV.

== Career ==
His father Hiroyuki was also a footballer, playing for the Japan national team and the corporative version of Kashiwa Reysol between the 1970s and 1980s.

After playing for Okinawa SV as the last of his career, he retired in December 2019.

== Club statistics ==
Updated to 23 February 2020.

| Club performance | | | League | | Cup | | League Cup | | Total | |
| Season | Club | League | Apps | Goals | Apps | Goals | Apps | Goals | Apps | Goals |
| Japan | | | League | | Emperor's Cup | | J. League Cup | | Total | |
|---|---|---|---|---|---|---|---|---|---|---|
| 2010 | Shimizu S-Pulse | J1 League | 0 | 0 | 0 | 0 | 0 | 0 | 0 | 0 |
| 2011 | Shimizu S-Pulse | J1 League | 14 | 0 | 1 | 0 | 2 | 0 | 17 | 0 |
| 2012 | Shimizu S-Pulse | J1 League | 0 | 0 | 0 | 0 | 0 | 0 | 0 | 0 |
| 2013 | JEF United Chiba | J2 League | 0 | 0 | 0 | 0 | – | | 0 | 0 |
| 2014 | JEF United Chiba | J2 League | 0 | 0 | 0 | 0 | – | | 0 | 0 |
| 2015 | Shimizu S-Pulse | J1 League | 0 | 0 | 0 | 0 | 1 | 0 | 1 | 0 |
| 2016 | Shimizu S-Pulse | J2 League | 3 | 0 | 0 | 0 | – | | 3 | 0 |
| 2017 | Machida Zelvia | J2 League | 0 | 0 | 0 | 0 | – | | 0 | 0 |
| 2018 | Okinawa SV | JRL (Kyushu) | 18 | 0 | – | | – | | 18 | 0 |
| 2019 | Okinawa SV | JRL (Kyushu) | 14 | 0 | 2 | 0 | – | | 16 | 0 |
| Total | | | 49 | 0 | 3 | 0 | 3 | 0 | 55 | 0 |
