= 1974 Emperor's Cup =

Japanese football tournament

Tournament details
- Country: Japan

Final positions
- Champions: Yanmar Diesel
- Runners-up: Eidai Industries
- Semifinalists: Mitsubishi Motors; Toyo Industries

Statistics of Emperor's Cup in the 1974 season.

== Overview ==
It was contested by 26 teams, and Yanmar Diesel won the championship.

== Results ==
=== First round ===
- Chuo University 6–0 Iwate Teachers
- Teijin Matsuyama 1–2 NTT Kinki

=== Second round ===
- Chuo University 0–2 Nippon Kokan
- Doshisha University 1–2 Nagoya Club
- Honda 1–2 Waseda University
- Kyushu Sangyo University 0–2 Osaka University of Commerce
- Sapporo University 2–1 Hosei University
- Mitsui Sosen 0–4 Tanabe Pharmaceuticals
- Teihens FC 0–5 Yomiuri
- Eidai Industries 2–2 (PK 3–0) NTT Kinki

=== Third round ===
- Furukawa Electric 0–1 Nippon Kokan
- Nagoya Club 2–5 Yanmar Diesel
- Toyota Motors 1–0 Waseda University
- Osaka University of Commerce 1–2 Mitsubishi Motors
- Hitachi 9–0 Sapporo University
- Tanabe Pharmaceuticals 0–1 Toyo Industries
- Towa Estate Development 3–2 Yomiuri
- Eidai Industries 1–1 (PK 3–1) Nippon Steel

=== Quarterfinals ===
- Nippon Kokan 0–3 Yanmar Diesel
- Toyota Motors 1–2 Mitsubishi Motors
- Hitachi 1–2 Toyo Industries
- Towa Estate Development 0–1 Eidai Industries

=== Semifinals ===
- Yanmar Diesel 2–0 Mitsubishi Motors
- Toyo Industries 1–2 Eidai Industries

=== Final ===
- Yanmar Diesel 2–1 Eidai Industries

Yanmar Diesel won the championship.
