= Ibaraki Hitachi SC =

Japanese football club

Ibaraki Hitachi S.C.
- Full name: Ibaraki Hitachi; Soccer Club
- Founded: 1923
- Dissolved: 1996
- Ground: Ibaraki, Japan

Ibaraki Hitachi Soccer Club was a Japanese football club based in Ibaraki. The club mainly played in the Kanto Adult Soccer League and was dissolved in 1996.
