= 1975 Emperor's Cup =

Japanese football tournament

Tournament details
- Country: Japan

Final positions
- Champions: Hitachi
- Runners-up: Fujita Industries
- Semifinalists: Yanmar Diesel; Mitsubishi Motors

Statistics of Emperor's Cup in the 1975 season.

== Overview ==
It was contested by 26 teams, and Hitachi won the championship.

== Results ==
=== 1st round ===
- Nippon Kokan 2–0 Waseda University
- Tanabe Pharmaceuticals 1–3 Eidai Industries
- Osaka University of Health and Sport Sciences 1–2 Chuo University
- Yamaha Motors 2–0 Hosei University
- Kyushu Sangyo University 1–0 NTT Kinki
- Hakodate Soccer 0–6 Chuo University
- Mitsubishi Oil 0–1 Teijin Matsuyama
- Nissei Resin Industry 1–3 Meiji University
- Toyota Motors 2–2 (PK 5–4) Osaka University of Commerce
- Nippon Steel Kamaishi 0–4 Fujita Industries

=== 2nd round ===
- Nippon Kokan 1–1 (PK 2–3) Eidai Industries
- Chuo University 0–3 Hitachi
- Nippon Steel 2–1 Yamaha Motors
- Kyushu Sangyo University 0–4 Yanmar Diesel
- Mitsubishi Motors 1–0 Chuo University
- Teijin Matsuyama 0–2 Toyo Industries
- Furukawa Electric 3–1 Meiji University
- Toyota Motors 0–1 Fujita Industries

=== Quarterfinals ===
- Eidai Industries 0–1 Hitachi
- Nippon Steel 0–2 Yanmar Diesel
- Mitsubishi Motors 2–1 Toyo Industries
- Furukawa Electric 1–2 Fujita Industries

=== Semifinals ===
- Hitachi 1–0 Yanmar Diesel
- Mitsubishi Motors 0–1 Fujita Industries

=== Final ===
- Hitachi 2–0 Fujita Industries

Hitachi won the championship.
