= 1968 Emperor's Cup =

Japanese football club competition

Tournament details
- Country: Japan
- Teams: 8

Final positions
- Champions: Yanmar Diesel (1st title)
- Runners-up: Mitsubishi Motors
- Semifinalists: Waseda University; Yawata Steel

Tournament statistics
- Matches played: 7
- Goals scored: 26 (3.71 per match)

Statistics of Emperor's Cup in the 1968 season. The cup was held between December 25, 1968, and January 1, 1969.

== Overview ==
It was contested by 8 teams, and Yanmar Diesel won the cup.

== Results ==
=== Quarterfinals ===
- Toyo Industries 0–2 Waseda University
- Mitsubishi Motors 5–0 Kansai University
- Yanmar Diesel 6–0 Rikkyo University
- Yawata Steel 1–0 Tokyo University of Education

=== Semifinals ===
- Waseda University 3–4 Mitsubishi Motors
- Yanmar Diesel 3–1 Yawata Steel

=== Final ===
- Mitsubishi Motors 0–1 Yanmar Diesel

Yanmar Diesel won the cup.

1968 Emperor's Cup
(Japan)
Yanmar Diesel
1st title
