= Eidai SC =

Eidai S.C.
- Full name: Eidai Soccer Club
- Founded: 1972 (as Eidai Industries SC)
- Dissolved: 1977
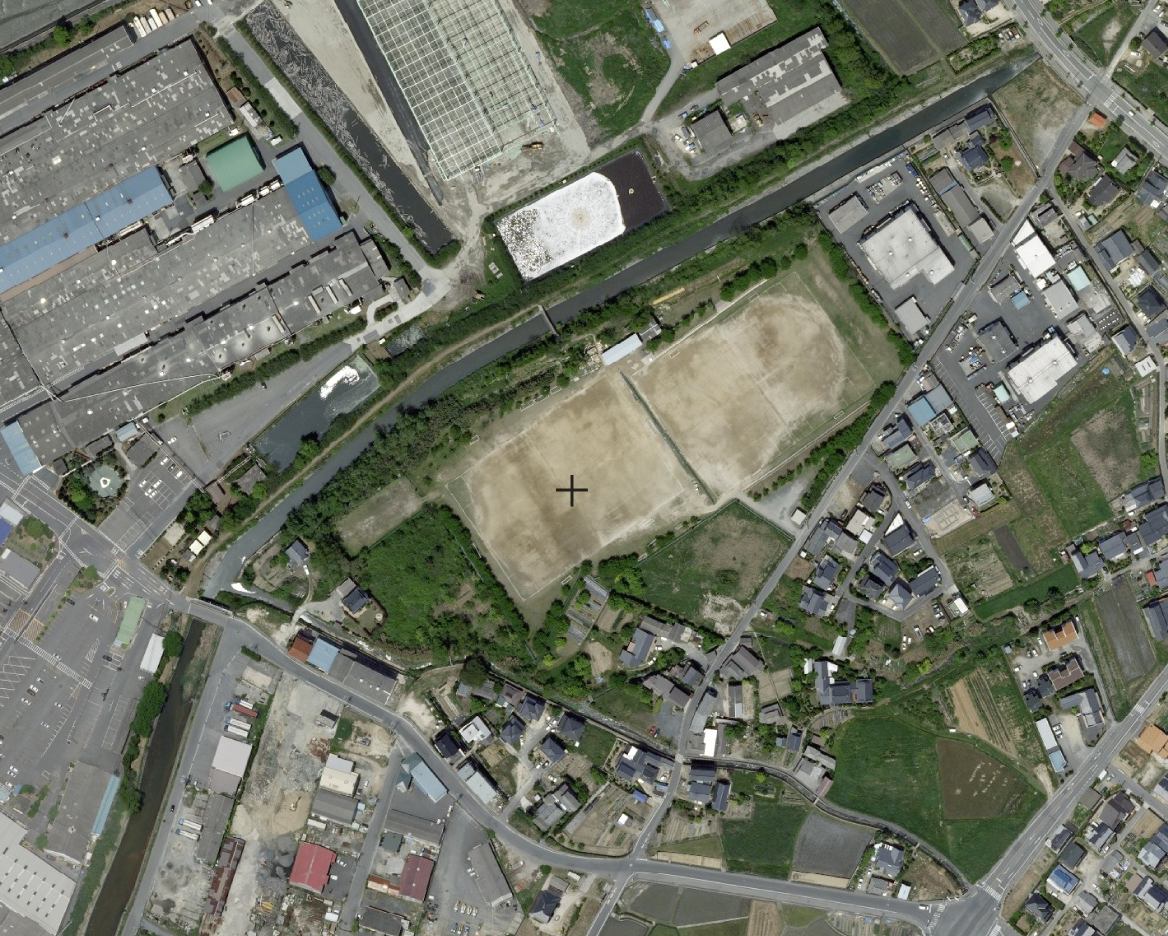
- Ground: Yamaguchi Prefecture, Japan

Eidai Soccer Club was a Japanese football club based in Yamaguchi Prefecture. The club has played in Japan Soccer League (Japanese former top division).

== History ==
The club was formed following the collapse of the original Nagoya Mutual Bank club. In 1973 they were promoted to the JSL Division 2 and the following year to Division 1. In their first season in the top flight they made the final of the Emperor's Cup, only to lose 2–1 to Yanmar Diesel.

In 1976 they had another opportunity at cup glory when they made the final of the Japan Soccer League Cup, but they lost again, 2–1 to Mitsubishi Motors. With increasing costs of running a top-flight team out of Yamaguchi Prefecture, at the time midway between Toyo Industries and Nippon Steel, Eidai Industries decided to close their team in March 1977, and thus Fujitsu, who had won Division 2 but lost the promotion/relegation series, was promoted anyway.

=== Record ===
Season	League	Pos	PTS	W	D	L	GF	GA	Emperor's Cup	League Cup
1973	JSL Division 2	1st	26	11	4	3	51	24	3rd round	
1974	JSL Division 1	9th	14	4	6	8	19	30	Final	
1975	JSL Division 1	5th	18	8	2	8	30	29	Quarter-final	
1976	JSL Division 1	7th	18	7	4	7	18	24	Quarter-final	Final

== Club name ==
- 1972–1975 : Eidai Industries SC
- 1976 : Eidai SC
