= 1972 Emperor's Cup =

Japanese football tournament

Tournament details
- Country: Japan

Final positions
- Champions: Hitachi
- Runners-up: Yanmar Diesel
- Semifinalists: Nippon Kokan; Toyo Industries

Statistics of Emperor's Cup in the 1972 season.

== Overview ==
It was contested by 24 teams. Starting this season, the Japan Soccer League First Division clubs entered automatically while those in the Second Division participated in regional qualifying tournaments with clubs in the regional leagues and with university teams, which lost their automatic spots.

Hitachi won the championship.

== Results ==
=== First round ===
- Kofu Club 4–1 Nippon Steel Muroran
- Chuo University 3–1 Nippon Steel Kamaishi
- Osaka Sangyo University 1–3 Eidai Industries
- Dainichi Cable Industries 3–2 Fukuoka University
- NTT Kinki 1–3 Toyota Motors
- Waseda University 2–3 Nippon Light Metal
- Tanabe Pharmaceuticals 3–1 Teijin Matsuyama
- Keio University 4–2 Toyama Club

=== Second round ===
- Hitachi 2–0 Kofu Club
- Towa Estate Development 2–0 Chuo University
- Nippon Kokan 3–1 Eidai Industries
- Mitsubishi Motors 9–0 Dainichi Cable Industries
- Nippon Steel 4–0 Toyota Motors
- Toyo Industries 2–0 Nippon Light Metal
- Furukawa Electric 4–2 Tanabe Pharmaceuticals
- Yanmar Diesel 4–0 Keio University

=== Quarter-finals ===
- Hitachi 4–0 Towa Estate Development
- Nippon Kokan 3–0 Mitsubishi Motors
- Nippon Steel 2–2 (PK 4–5) Toyo Industries
- Furukawa Electric 1–4 Yanmar Diesel

=== Semi-finals ===
- Hitachi 2–0 Nippon Kokan
- Toyo Industries 0–1 Yanmar Diesel

=== Final ===
- Hitachi 2–1 Yanmar Diesel

Hitachi won the championship.
