= Football at the 1976 Summer Olympics – Men's qualification =

The men's qualification for the 1976 Summer Olympics.

== Qualified teams ==
16 teams qualified, but 13 participated in the finals of the Olympic tournament.

- Automatically qualified
  - Canada (as hosts)
  - Poland (as holders)
- Europe (UEFA)
  - East Germany
  - France
  - Spain
  - Soviet Union
- Africa (CAF)
  - Ghana (withdrew)
  - Nigeria (withdrew)
  - Zambia (withdrew)
- Asia (AFC)
  - Iran
  - Israel
  - North Korea
- North and Central America (CONCACAF)
  - Cuba (replaces Uruguay)
  - Guatemala
  - Mexico
- South America (CONMEBOL)
  - Brazil
  - Uruguay (withdrew)

== Qualifications ==
=== UEFA (Europe) ===
The European Qualifiers for the 1976 Summer Olympics tournament took place after two rounds (qualifying and tournament). East Germany, France, Spain and Soviet Union gained qualification to the Olympic tournament and Poland qualified automatically as holders.

=== CONMEBOL (South America) ===
The South American Pre-Olympic tournament was held in Brazil. Newell's Old Boys represented Argentina. In the end, Brazil and Uruguay qualify however Uruguay withdrew from the final tournament. Argentina were invited to replace them but declined and the place went to Cuba (best CONCACAF non-qualifiers).

=== CONCACAF (North, Central America and Caribbean) ===
The CONCACAF qualifying rounds and Pre-Olympic tournament saw Guatemala and Mexico qualify. Canada qualified automatically as hosts. Cuba were invited after the withdrawal of Uruguay and Argentina's refusal to replace them.

=== CAF (Africa) ===
The African Qualifiers tournament for the 1976 Summer Olympics took place over a total of two rounds.

Ghana, Nigeria and Zambia qualified, but they boycotted the Olympics a day before the Opening Ceremony (alongside 31 other nations, 26 of them African) to protest the participation of New Zealand, whose rugby union team had a summer tour of South Africa in spite of the Soweto uprising.

=== AFC (Asia) ===
The Pre-Olympic tournaments of the Asian Qualifiers for the 1976 Summer Olympics saw Iran, Israel and North Korea qualify.
