= 1976 JSL Cup =

Tournament details
- Country: Japan

Final positions
- Champions: Hitachi
- Runners-up: Eidai
- Semifinalists: Mitsubishi Motors; Furukawa Electric

Statistics of JSL Cup in the 1976 season.

== Overview ==
It was contested by 20 teams, and Hitachi won the championship.

== Results ==
=== East-A ===
	Mitsubishi Motors	Furukawa Electric	Yomiuri	Nippon Kokan	Sumitomo Metals
Mitsubishi Motors	-	1-1	2-1	1-0	5-0
Furukawa Electric	1-1	-	0-4	3-2	6-0
Yomiuri	1-2	4-0	-	1-3	1-1
Nippon Kokan	0-1	2-3	3-1	-	2-3
Sumitomo Metals	0-5	0-6	1-1	3-2	-

=== East-B ===
	Hitachi	Fujita Industries	Fujitsu	Kofu	Furukawa Electric Chiba
Hitachi	-	1-1	1-1	6-0	4-0
Fujita Industries	1-1	-	4-0	0-1	6-0
Fujitsu	1-1	0-4	-	5-1	4-0
Kofu	0-6	1-0	1-5	-	1-1
Furukawa Electric Chiba	0-4	0-6	0-4	1-1	-

=== West-A ===
	Eidai	Toyota Motors	Yanmar Diesel	Tanabe Pharmaceuticals	Kyoto Shiko
Eidai	-	2-0	2-1	2-1	3-1
Toyota Motors	0-2	-	1-0	5-2	1-1
Yanmar Diesel	1-2	0-1	-	1-1	1-0
Tanabe Pharmaceuticals	1-2	2-5	1-1	-	3-1
Kyoto Shiko	1-3	1-1	0-1	1-3	-

=== West-B ===
	Toyo Industries	Honda	Yanmar Club	Teijin	Nippon Steel
Toyo Industries	-	2-2	3-1	1-0	0-0
Honda	2-2	-	0-0	2-1	1-1
Yanmar Club	1-3	0-0	-	0-0	1-0
Teijin	0-1	1-2	0-0	-	3-2
Nippon Steel	0-0	1-1	0-1	2-3	-

=== Quarterfinals ===
- Mitsubishi Motors 2-0 Honda
- Eidai 2-1 Fujita Industries
- Hitachi 2-1 Toyota Motors
- Toyo Industries 1-3 Furukawa Electric

=== Semifinals ===
- Mitsubishi Motors 0-1 Eidai
- Hitachi 1-1 (PK 2–0) Furukawa Electric

=== Final ===
- Eidai 0-1 Hitachi

Hitachi won the championship
