= 1973 Emperor's Cup =

Japanese football tournament

Tournament details
- Country: Japan

Final positions
- Champions: Mitsubishi Motors
- Runners-up: Hitachi
- Semifinalists: Toyo Industries; Yanmar Diesel

Statistics of Emperor's Cup in the 1973 season.

== Overview ==
It was contested by 26 teams, and Mitsubishi Motors won the championship.

== Results ==
=== 1st round ===
- Chuo University 3–0 Nippon Steel Kamaishi
- Otsuka Pharmaceutical 3–1 Osaka University of Economics

=== 2nd round ===
- Chuo University 1–4 Toyota Motors
- Eidai Industries 1–0 Dainichi Cable Industries
- Meijo University 0–1 Waseda University
- Kyushu Sangyo University 2–3 Osaka University of Commerce
- Kyoto Shiko 2–2 (PK 2–3) Honda
- Sapporo University 0–4 Nippon Sport Science University
- Teihens FC 0–8 Hosei University
- Tanabe Pharmaceuticals 2–1 Otsuka Pharmaceutical

=== 3rd round ===
- Nippon Kokan 3–0 Toyota Motors
- Eidai Industries 0–1 Toyo Industries
- Furukawa Electric 2–2 (PK 3–1) Waseda University
- Osaka University of Commerce 0–3 Hitachi
- Yanmar Diesel 4–1 Honda
- Nippon Sport Science University 0–2 Towa Estate Development
- Mitsubishi Motors 1–1 (PK 5–4) Hosei University
- Tanabe Pharmaceuticals 0–3 Nippon Steel

=== Quarterfinals ===
- Nippon Kokan 3–4 Toyo Industries
- Furukawa Electric 1–3 Hitachi
- Yanmar Diesel 1–0 Towa Estate Development
- Mitsubishi Motors 2–0 Nippon Steel

=== Semifinals ===
- Toyo Industries 0–2 Hitachi
- Yanmar Diesel 0–1 Mitsubishi Motors

=== Final ===
- Hitachi 1–2 Mitsubishi Motors

Mitsubishi Motors won the championship.
