= 1982 Japan Soccer League =

Japan Soccer League
- Season: 1982
- Teams: 10
- Champions: Mitsubishi Motors; 4th title
- Runner up: Yanmar Diesel
- Matches: 90
- Goals: 238 (2.64 per match)
- Top goalscorer: Hiroyuki Usui (13 goals)

1982 was the 18th season of the Japan Soccer League.

== First Division ==
Mitsubishi tied Yanmar's four championships with its own run.

NKK could not adjust to the top flight for this season and was relegated instantly. Honda saved itself by defeating Toshiba in the playout.

| Pos | Team | Pld | W | D | L | GF | GA | GD | Pts | Qualification or relegation |
|---|---|---|---|---|---|---|---|---|---|---|
| 1 | Mitsubishi Motors | 18 | 10 | 3 | 5 | 27 | 16 | +11 | 23 | Champions |
| 2 | Yanmar Diesel | 18 | 9 | 4 | 5 | 25 | 17 | +8 | 22 | |
| 3 | Furukawa Electric | 18 | 8 | 5 | 5 | 25 | 19 | +6 | 21 | |
| 4 | Fujita Engineering | 18 | 8 | 4 | 6 | 26 | 21 | +5 | 20 | |
| 5 | Yomiuri | 18 | 8 | 3 | 7 | 23 | 18 | +5 | 19 | |
| 6 | Hitachi | 18 | 8 | 3 | 7 | 29 | 27 | +2 | 19 | |
| 7 | Mazda | 18 | 4 | 9 | 5 | 16 | 20 | −4 | 17 | |
| 8 | Nissan | 18 | 5 | 4 | 9 | 14 | 24 | −10 | 14 | |
| 9 | Honda | 18 | 4 | 6 | 8 | 17 | 29 | −12 | 14 | To promotion/relegation Series |
| 10 | Nippon Kokan | 18 | 1 | 9 | 8 | 12 | 23 | −11 | 11 | Relegated to Second Division |

Source: RSSSF

=== Promotion/relegation Series ===
| JSL Division 1 | 1st leg | 2nd leg | JSL Division 2 |
|---|---|---|---|
| Honda | 2-1 | 3-0 | Toshiba |

== Second Division ==
Yamaha returned to the First Division at the first attempt and also had an amazing cup run, winning the Emperor's Cup.

Saitama Teachers kept its League place by defeating Seino Transportation of Gifu, while Teijin, the top representative of Matsuyama, Ehime at the time, went back to the Shikoku regional league.

| Pos | Team | Pld | W | D | L | GF | GA | GD | Pts | Promotion or relegation |
|---|---|---|---|---|---|---|---|---|---|---|
| 1 | Yamaha Motors | 18 | 12 | 5 | 1 | 35 | 11 | +24 | 29 | Promoted to First Division |
| 2 | Toshiba | 18 | 12 | 2 | 4 | 39 | 16 | +23 | 26 | To promotion/relegation Series with First Division |
| 3 | Sumitomo | 18 | 11 | 3 | 4 | 32 | 18 | +14 | 25 | |
| 4 | Tanabe Pharmaceuticals | 18 | 10 | 2 | 6 | 27 | 16 | +11 | 22 | |
| 5 | Nippon Steel | 18 | 8 | 3 | 7 | 24 | 21 | +3 | 19 | |
| 6 | Toyota Motors | 18 | 6 | 2 | 10 | 19 | 26 | −7 | 14 | |
| 7 | Fujitsu | 18 | 4 | 5 | 9 | 16 | 26 | −10 | 13 | |
| 8 | Kofu Club | 18 | 4 | 4 | 10 | 15 | 23 | −8 | 12 | |
| 9 | Saitama Teachers | 18 | 4 | 3 | 11 | 14 | 38 | −24 | 11 | To promotion/relegation Series with Regional Series |
| 10 | Teijin SC | 18 | 3 | 3 | 12 | 17 | 43 | −26 | 9 | Relegated to Regional Leagues |

Source: RSSSF

=== Promotion/relegation Series ===
| JSL | 1st leg | 2nd leg | Regional Series |
|---|---|---|---|
| Saitama Teachers | 0-0 | 3-1 | Seino Transportation (runner-up) |
