= Tanabe Mitsubishi Pharma SC =

Japanese football club

Tanabe Mitsubishi Pharmaceutical S.C.
- Full name: Tanabe Mitsubishi Pharmaceutical; Soccer Club
- Founded: 1927 as Tanabe Gohee Shoten S.C.
- Dissolved: 2018
- Ground: Osaka, Japan
- League: Osaka Prefectural Leagues

Tanabe Mitsubishi Pharmaceutical Soccer Club was a Japanese football club based in Osaka that belonged to Mitsubishi Tanabe Pharma. The club played in Japan Soccer League (Japanese former top division) for one season in 1973. It last played in the Osaka Prefectural Leagues.

Tanabe Pharmaceutical co-founded both the second tier (1972 Japan Soccer League Second Division) and third tier (1992 Japan Football League Division Two) of Japanese football with neighbors Kyoto Sanga FC and with Ventforet Kofu. However, unlike them, they never became a J. League club nor won the Emperor's Cup, though they came close in 1980 - the first finalist from the second tier.

== Club name ==
- 1927–1943: Tanabe Gohee Shoten S.C.
- 1943–2006: Tanabe Pharmaceutical S.C.
- 2007–2018: Tanabe Mitsubishi Pharma S.C.

== Honours ==
=== League titles ===
- JSL Division 2
  - Champions (1): 1975
  - Runners-up (1): 1972
- Kansai Soccer League
  - Champions (2): 1970, 1993
  - Runners-up (2): 1971, 1996

=== Cups ===
- Emperor's Cup
  - Runners-up (1): 1980
- All Japan Works Football Championship
  - Winners (7): 1950, 1951, 1952, 1953, 1954, 1955, 1957
  - Runners-up (2): 1948, 1956
