= 1980 Japan Soccer League =

Japan Soccer League
- Season: 1980
- Teams: 10
- Champions: Yanmar Diesel; 4th title
- Runner up: Fujita Engineering
- Matches: 90
- Goals: 263 (2.92 per match)
- Top goalscorer: Hiroyuki Usui (14 goals)

Statistics of Japan Soccer League for the 1980 season. For the first time ever, automatic promotion and relegation was introduced for the first and last places of the Second Division, which means that the last place in the First Division went down.

== First Division ==
Yanmar Diesel won the title for a fourth time.

Nissan, who had saved itself from relegation in the playout the previous season, went down after the bottom place was granted automatic relegation, while Yamaha saved itself by beating Fujitsu in the playout. Since this season the following rule is applied: 3 points for a win and 1 point for a draw.

Pos	Team	Pld	W	D	L	GF	GA	GD	Pts	Qualification or relegation
1	Yanmar Diesel	18	13	4	1	29	13	+16	30	Champions
2	Fujita Engineering	18	10	3	5	33	19	+14	23	
3	Furukawa Electric	18	9	4	5	26	21	+5	22	
4	Mitsubishi Motors	18	7	6	5	24	20	+4	20	
5	Hitachi	18	8	3	7	32	28	+4	19	
6	Yomiuri	18	8	1	9	37	29	+8	17	
7	Toyo Kogyo	18	6	3	9	22	26	−4	15	
8	Nippon Steel	18	6	3	9	21	27	−6	15	
9	Yamaha Motors	18	5	3	10	28	39	−11	13	To promotion/relegation Series
10	Nissan	18	2	2	14	11	41	−30	6	Relegated to Second Division

Source: RSSSF

=== Promotion/relegation Series ===
JSL Division 1	1st leg	2nd leg	JSL Division 2
Yamaha Motors	1-0	1-1	Fujitsu

== Second Division ==
Honda was finally promoted on the second attempt after the 1978 debacle.

Kofu Club saved itself from relegation by defeating Furukawa Electric Chiba, Furukawa's B-team. Cosmo Oil Yokkaichi fell through and went back to the Tokai regional league.

Pos	Team	Pld	W	D	L	GF	GA	GD	Pts	Promotion or relegation
1	Honda	18	13	2	3	43	17	+26	28	Promoted to First Division
2	Fujitsu	18	10	5	3	25	12	+13	25	To promotion/relegation Series with First Division
3	Toshiba	18	8	6	4	30	17	+13	22	
4	Nippon Kokan	18	7	6	5	23	17	+6	20	
5	Toyota Motors	18	7	4	7	29	34	−5	18	
6	Tanabe Pharmaceuticals	18	6	5	7	19	22	−3	17	
7	Teijin Matsuyama	18	7	3	8	20	24	−4	17	
8	Sumitomo	18	4	5	9	22	33	−11	13	
9	Kofu Club	18	4	2	12	17	33	−16	10	To promotion/relegation Series with Regional Series
10	Daikyo Oil	18	5	0	13	27	46	−19	10	Relegated to Regional Leagues

Source: RSSSF

=== Promotion/relegation Series ===
JSL	1st leg	2nd leg	Regional Series
Kofu Club	1-2	4-1	Furukawa Electric Chiba (runner-up)
