= 1971 Japan Soccer League =

Japan Soccer League
- Season: 1971
- Teams: 8
- Champions: Yanmar Diesel; 1st title
- Runner up: Mitsubishi Motors
- Matches: 56
- Goals: 172 (3.07 per match)
- Top goalscorer: Kunishige Kamamoto (11 goals)

== Japan Soccer League – 1971 season ==
Pos	Team	Pld	W	D	L	GF	GA	GD	Pts	Qualification
1	Yanmar Diesel	14	9	4	1	32	13	+19	22	Champions
2	Mitsubishi Motors	14	7	4	3	32	12	+20	18	
3	Nippon Steel	14	8	2	4	34	23	+11	18	
4	Hitachi	14	7	4	3	18	17	+1	18	
5	Furukawa Electric	14	5	5	4	24	24	0	15	
6	Toyo Industries	14	3	4	7	11	17	−6	10	
7	Nippon Kokan	14	2	4	8	11	23	−12	8	To promotion/relegation Series
8	Nagoya Mutual Bank	14	0	3	11	10	43	−33	3	To promotion/relegation Series

Source: RSSSF

== Promotion/relegation Series ==
Nagoya Mutual Bank lost its place in the League for a second time, this time to Towa Real Estate, which would become one of the biggest names in Japanese football as Fujita Engineering and Bellmare Hiratsuka, currently known as Shonan Bellmare.

JSL	1st leg	2nd leg	Senior Cup
Nippon Kokan	2–2	0–0	Tanabe Pharmaceutical (Cup runner-up)
Nagoya Mutual Bank	0–0	0–1	Towa Real Estate (Cup winner)

Towa RE promoted, Nagoya Mutual Bank relegated; NMB resigned from JSL instead of forming Second Division.
