= 1973 Japan Soccer League =

Football tournament's edition

Japan Soccer League
- Season: 1973
- Teams: 10
- Champions: Mitsubishi Motors; 2nd title
- Runner up: Hitachi
- Matches: 90
- Goals: 264 (2.93 per match)
- Top goalscorer: Akira Matsunaga (11 goals)

The 1973 season of Japanese football.

== League tables ==
=== JSL First Division ===
Tanabe Pharmaceuticals was relegated, thereby becoming the first Japanese team to go straight back down one season after promotion.

Pos	Team	Pld	W	D	L	GF	GA	GD	Pts	Qualification
1	Mitsubishi Motors	18	14	2	2	35	12	+23	30	Champions
2	Hitachi	18	12	1	5	35	18	+17	25	
3	Yanmar Diesel	18	10	3	5	40	17	+23	23	
4	Towa Real Estate	18	9	3	6	29	22	+7	21	
5	Furukawa Electric	18	9	3	6	31	27	+4	21	
6	Nippon Steel	18	7	2	9	25	26	−1	16	
7	Toyota Motors	18	5	5	8	22	31	−9	15	
8	Toyo Industries	18	4	6	8	16	28	−12	14	
9	Nippon Kokan	18	4	4	10	24	32	−8	12	To promotion/relegation Series
10	Tanabe Pharmaceutical	18	1	1	16	7	51	−44	3	To promotion/relegation Series

Source: RSSSF

=== JSL 1/2 promotion/relegation Series ===
JSL Division 1	1st leg	2nd leg	JSL Division 2
Nippon Kokan	2-1	2-2	Kofu SC
Tanabe Pharmaceutical	2-1	0-2	Eidai Industries

Eidai promoted, Tanabe relegated.

=== JSL Second Division ===
Pos	Team	Pld	W	D	L	GF	GA	GD	Pts	Qualification
1	Eidai Industries	18	11	4	3	51	24	+27	26	To promotion/relegation Series with Division 1
2	Kofu SC	18	12	2	4	39	25	+14	26	To promotion/relegation Series with Division 1
3	Yomiuri	18	10	4	4	40	21	+19	24	
4	Fujitsu	18	9	4	5	33	28	+5	22	
5	NTT Kinki	18	8	5	5	31	29	+2	21	
6	Dainichi Nippon Cable Industries	18	5	6	7	30	34	−4	16	
7	Kyoto Shiko	18	5	4	9	31	35	−4	14	
8	Teijin Matsuyama	18	4	5	9	21	43	−22	13	
9	Toyoda Automatic Loom Works	18	2	5	11	20	34	−14	9	To promotion/relegation Series with Senior Cup Finalists
10	Hagoromo Club	18	3	3	12	25	48	−23	9	To promotion/relegation Series with Senior Cup Finalists

Source: RSSSF

=== JSL promotion/relegation Series ===
Sumitomo, at the time based in Osaka, would move to Kashima, Ibaraki in 1975 and become today's Kashima Antlers.

JSL	1st leg	2nd leg	Senior Cup
Toyoda Automatic Loom Works	1-1	1-2	Ibaraki Hitachi (Cup runner-up)
Hagoromo Club	2-2	1-2	Sumitomo Metal (Cup winner)

Ibaraki Hitachi and Sumitomo promoted, Toyota Industries and Hagoromo Club relegated.
