= 1972 Japan Soccer League =

Japan Soccer League
- Season: 1972
- Teams: 8
- Champions: Hitachi; 1st title
- Runner up: Yanmar Diesel
- Matches: 56
- Goals: 177 (3.16 per match)
- Top goalscorer: Akira Matsunaga (12 goals)

The 1972 season in Japanese football introduced a Second Division to the Japan Soccer League. Nine clubs were chosen from the 1971 Japanese Regional Leagues; when Nagoya Mutual Bank resigned from the League, a tenth club was chosen from the Kansai League.

== League tables ==
=== JSL First Division ===
No relegation took place as the First Division was being expanded to 10 clubs.

Pos	Team	Pld	W	D	L	GF	GA	GD	Pts	Qualification
1	Hitachi	14	9	3	2	36	16	+20	21	Champions
2	Yanmar Diesel	14	7	6	1	30	11	+19	20	
3	Toyo Industries	14	7	2	5	20	13	+7	16	
4	Mitsubishi Motors	14	5	6	3	26	19	+7	16	
5	Nippon Kokan	14	4	5	5	15	18	−3	13	
6	Nippon Steel	14	4	4	6	22	30	−8	12	
7	Furukawa Electric	14	3	2	9	17	41	−24	8	
8	Towa Real Estate	14	2	2	10	11	29	−18	6	

Source: RSSSF

=== JSL Second Division ===
Toyota Motors, later one of the Japanese big names as Nagoya Grampus, was crowned the inaugural Second Division champion. Tanabe Pharmaceutical, a club from Osaka, followed them into the expanded 10-team First Division. No relegations took place, to keep the Second Division at 10 clubs.

Pos	Team	Pld	W	D	L	GF	GA	GD	Pts	Promotion
1	Toyota Motors	18	13	4	1	34	16	+18	30	Promoted to First Division
2	Tanabe Pharmaceutical	18	10	6	2	37	22	+15	26	Promoted to First Division
3	Kofu SC	18	9	3	6	33	21	+12	21	
4	Fujitsu	18	4	9	5	19	23	−4	17	
5	Kyoto Shiko	18	7	3	8	26	31	−5	17	
6	Nippon Light Metal	18	7	2	9	31	33	−2	16	
7	Yomiuri	18	7	1	10	27	31	−4	15	
8	Dainichi Nippon Cable Industries	18	5	4	9	36	40	−4	14	
9	NTT Kinki	18	4	6	8	21	25	−4	14	
10	Toyoda Automatic Loom Works	18	4	2	12	14	36	−22	10	

Source: RSSSF
