= 1974 Japan Soccer League =

Japan Soccer League
- Season: 1974
- Teams: 10
- Champions: Yanmar Diesel; 2nd title
- Runner up: Mitsubishi Motors
- Matches: 90
- Goals: 262 (2.91 per match)
- Top goalscorer: Kunishige Kamamoto (21 goals)

== League tables ==
=== First Division ===
Pos	Team	Pld	W	D	L	GF	GA	GD	Pts	Qualification
1	Yanmar Diesel	18	10	5	3	47	24	+23	25	Champions
2	Mitsubishi Motors	18	11	3	4	37	18	+19	25	
3	Hitachi	18	7	5	6	33	22	+11	19	
4	Furukawa Electric	18	7	5	6	25	24	+1	19	
5	Nippon Steel	18	8	3	7	24	25	−1	19	
6	Toyo Industries	18	6	6	6	20	25	−5	18	
7	Nippon Kokan	18	6	5	7	24	28	−4	17	
8	Towa Real Estate	18	5	6	7	25	30	−5	16	
9	Eidai Industries	18	4	6	8	19	30	−11	14	To promotion/relegation Series
10	Toyota Motors	18	3	2	13	8	36	−28	8	To promotion/relegation Series

Source: RSSSF

=== Promotion/relegation Series ===
JSL Division 1	1st leg	2nd leg	JSL Division 2
Eidai Industries	3-2	3-1	Fujitsu
Toyota Motors	1-0	3-2	Yomiuri

No relegations.

== Second Division ==
Pos	Team	Pld	W	D	L	GF	GA	GD	Pts	Qualification
1	Yomiuri	18	11	4	3	46	20	+26	26	To promotion/relegation Series with Division 1
2	Fujitsu	18	9	4	5	32	19	+13	22	To promotion/relegation Series with Division 1
3	Kyoto Shiko	18	9	4	5	27	20	+7	22	
4	NTT Kinki	18	8	4	6	29	24	+5	20	
5	Kofu SC	18	8	4	6	30	26	+4	20	
6	Teijin Matsuyama	18	7	5	6	29	33	−4	19	
7	Dainichi Nippon Cable Industries	18	7	3	8	32	27	+5	17	
8	Tanabe Pharmaceutical	18	7	2	9	33	31	+2	16	
9	Sumitomo Metal	18	4	4	10	23	48	−25	12	To promotion/relegation Series with Senior Cup finalists
10	Ibaraki Hitachi	18	1	4	13	10	43	−33	6	To promotion/relegation Series with Senior Cup finalists

Source: RSSSF

=== JSL promotion/relegation Series ===
JSL	1st leg	2nd leg	Senior Cup
Sumitomo Metal	2-1	3-2	Yanmar Club (Cup runner-up)
Ibaraki Hitachi	1-1	0-2	Honda (Cup winner)

Honda promoted, Ibaraki Hitachi relegated.

== All-Star Game ==
March 13, 1974

JSL XI	0 – 1	(North Korea) Pyongyang April 25 S.C.

National Olympic Stadium, Tokyo
