= 1976 Japan Soccer League =

Japan Soccer League
- Season: 1976
- Teams: 10
- Champions: Furukawa Electric; 1st title
- Runner up: Mitsubishi Motors
- Matches: 90
- Goals: 238 (2.64 per match)
- Top goalscorer: Kunishige Kamamoto (15 goals)

Statistics of Japan Soccer League for the 1976 season.

== League tables ==
=== First Division ===
Pos	Team	Pld	W	D	L	GF	GA	GD	Pts	Qualification
1	Furukawa Electric	18	11	4	3	37	15	+22	26	Champions
2	Mitsubishi Motors	18	9	4	5	28	16	+12	22	
3	Fujita	18	9	4	5	28	20	+8	22	
4	Yanmar Diesel	18	9	3	6	34	20	+14	21	
5	Hitachi	18	7	7	4	22	14	+8	21	
6	Nippon Kokan	18	6	8	4	22	21	+1	20	
7	Eidai	18	7	4	7	18	24	−6	18	Folded
8	Toyo Industries	18	5	5	8	16	20	−4	15	
9	Nippon Steel	18	5	2	11	23	30	−7	12	To promotion/relegation Series
10	Toyota Motors	18	1	1	16	10	58	−48	3	To promotion/relegation Series

=== Promotion/relegation Series ===
JSL Division 1	1st leg	2nd leg	JSL Division 2
Nippon Steel	2-1	3-2	Yomiuri
Toyota Motors	2-2	2-1	Fujitsu

Since Eidai dropped out of the league and folded in March 1977, Fujitsu was promoted, meaning no team was relegated.

=== Second Division ===
Pos	Team	Pld	W	D	L	GF	GA	GD	Pts	Qualification
1	Fujitsu	18	13	3	2	32	6	+26	29	To promotion/relegation Series with Division 1
2	Yomiuri	18	11	3	4	51	28	+23	25	To promotion/relegation Series with Division 1
3	Tanabe Pharmaceutical	18	10	5	3	28	18	+10	25	
4	Honda	18	6	9	3	25	17	+8	21	
5	Teijin Matsuyama	18	9	1	8	32	28	+4	19	
6	Yanmar Club	18	6	5	7	23	23	0	17	
7	Sumitomo Metal	18	5	3	10	27	34	−7	13	
8	Kofu SC	18	4	4	10	14	30	−16	12	
9	Kyoto Shiko	18	3	5	10	11	25	−14	11	To promotion/relegation Series with Senior Cup finalists
10	Furukawa Electric Chiba	18	3	2	13	17	51	−34	8	To promotion/relegation Series with Senior Cup finalists

=== JSL promotion/relegation Series ===
Nissan Motors, future Yokohama Marinos, currently Yokohama F. Marinos, joined the league for the first time.

JSL	1st leg	2nd leg	Senior Cup
Kyoto Shiko	2-1	2-1	Dainichi Nippon Cable Industries (Cup runner-up)
Furukawa Electric Chiba	0-0	0-1	Nissan Motors (Cup winner)

Nissan promoted. Furukawa Chiba was not relegated due to Eidai's withdrawal.
