= Japan national football team results (1970–1979) =

This article lists the results for the Japan national football team between 1970 and 1979.

== 1970 ==
Date	Opponent	Result	Score	Venue	Competition	Ref
31 July 1970	Hong Kong	L	1–2	Kuala Lumpur, Malaysia	Merdeka Tournament	
2 August 1970	South Korea	D	1–1	Kuala Lumpur, Malaysia	Merdeka Tournament	
4 August 1970	Thailand	D	0–0	Kuala Lumpur, Malaysia	Merdeka Tournament	
8 August 1970	Indonesia	W	4–3	Kuala Lumpur, Malaysia	Merdeka Tournament	
10 August 1970	Singapore	W	4–0	Kuala Lumpur, Malaysia	Merdeka Tournament	
16 August 1970	Taiwan	W	3–2	Kuala Lumpur, Malaysia	Merdeka Tournament	
10 December 1970	Malaysia	W	1–0	Bangkok, Thailand	1970 Asian Games Football	
12 December 1970	Khmer Republic	W	1–0	Bangkok, Thailand	1970 Asian Games Football	
14 December 1970	Burma	W	2–1	Bangkok, Thailand	1970 Asian Games Football	
16 December 1970	Indonesia	W	2–1	Bangkok, Thailand	1970 Asian Games Football	
17 December 1970	India	W	1–0	Bangkok, Thailand	1970 Asian Games Football	
18 December 1970	South Korea	L	1–2	Bangkok, Thailand	1970 Asian Games Football	
19 December 1970	India	L	0–1	Bangkok, Thailand	1970 Asian Games Football	

== 1971 ==
Date	Opponent	Result	Score	Venue	Competition
28 July 1971	Denmark	L	2-3	Copenhagen, Denmark	International Friendly
6 August 1971	Taiwan	W	2–0^{1}	Kuala Lumpur, Malaysia	Merdeka Tournament
9 August 1971	Malaysia	L	1–4^{1}	Kuala Lumpur, Malaysia	Merdeka Tournament
12 August 1971	South Korea	L	0–3^{1}	Kuala Lumpur, Malaysia	Merdeka Tournament
13 August 1971	Iceland	W	2–0	Reykjavík, Iceland	International Friendly
16 August 1971	Thailand	W	3–2^{1}	Kuala Lumpur, Malaysia	Merdeka Tournament
17 August 1971	South Vietnam	L	0–2^{1}	Kuala Lumpur, Malaysia	Merdeka Tournament
21 August 1971	India	W	1–0^{1}	Kuala Lumpur, Malaysia	Merdeka Tournament
23 September 1971	Malaysia	L	0–3^{1}	Seoul, South Korea	1972 Olympic Games Qualification
27 September 1971	Philippines	W	8–1^{1}	Seoul, South Korea	1972 Olympic Games Qualification
29 September 1971	Taiwan	W	5–1^{1}	Seoul, South Korea	1972 Olympic Games Qualification
2 October 1971	South Korea	L	1–2^{1}	Seoul, South Korea	1972 Olympic Games Qualification
1:Not recognized by FIFA.

== 1972 ==
Date	Opponent	Result	Score	Venue	Competition
12 July 1972	Khmer Republic	W	4–1	Kuala Lumpur, Malaysia	Merdeka Tournament
16 July 1972	Sri Lanka	W	5–0	Kuala Lumpur, Malaysia	Merdeka Tournament
18 July 1972	Philippines	W	5–1	Kuala Lumpur, Malaysia	Merdeka Tournament
20 July 1972	Burma B	W	6–1	Kuala Lumpur, Malaysia	Merdeka Tournament
22 July 1972	Malaysia	L	1–3	Kuala Lumpur, Malaysia	Merdeka Tournament
26 July 1972	South Korea	L	0–3	Kuala Lumpur, Malaysia	Merdeka Tournament
28 July 1972	Malaysia B	W	1-0	Kuala Lumpur, Malaysia	Merdeka Tournament
4 August 1972	Philippines	W	4–1	Singapore	Pesta Sukan tournament
6 August 1972	Indonesia	L	0–1	Singapore	Pesta Sukan tournament
14 September 1972	South Korea	D	2–2	National Olympic Stadium, Tokyo, Japan	International Friendly

== 1973 ==
Date	Opponent	Result	Score	Venue	Competition
16 May 1973	Israel	L	1–2	Seoul, South Korea	1974 FIFA World Cup qualification (AFC and OFC)
20 May 1973	South Vietnam	W	4–0	Seoul, South Korea	1974 FIFA World Cup qualification (AFC and OFC)
22 May 1973	Hong Kong	L	0–1	Seoul, South Korea	1974 FIFA World Cup qualification (AFC and OFC)
26 May 1973	Israel	L	0–1	Seoul, South Korea	1974 FIFA World Cup qualification (AFC and OFC)
23 June 1973	South Korea	L	0–2	Seoul, South Korea	International Friendly

== 1974 ==
Date	Opponent	Result	Score	Venue	Competition
12 February 1974	Singapore	W	1–0	Singapore	International Friendly
20 February 1974	Hong Kong	D	0–0	Hong Kong	International Friendly
23 July 1974	Romania	L	1–4	Constanta, Romania	International Friendly
3 September 1974	Philippines	W	4–0	Amjadieh Stadium, Tehran, Iran	1974 Asian Games Football
5 September 1974	Malaysia	D	1–1	Persepolis Stadium, Tehran, Iran	1974 Asian Games Football
7 September 1974	Israel	L	0–3	Aryamehr Stadium, Tehran, Iran	1974 Asian Games Football
28 September 1974	South Korea	W	4–1	National Olympic Stadium, Tokyo, Japan	International Friendly

== 1975 ==
Date	Opponent	Result	Score	Venue	Competition
14 June 1975	Hong Kong	D	0–0; 3–4 (pen.)	Hong Kong	1976 AFC Asian Cup qualification
17 June 1975	North Korea	L	0–1	Hong Kong	1976 AFC Asian Cup qualification
21 June 1975	Singapore	W	2–1	Hong Kong	1976 AFC Asian Cup qualification
23 June 1975	China	L	1–2	Hong Kong	1976 AFC Asian Cup qualification
26 June 1975	Hong Kong	W	1–0	Hong Kong	1976 AFC Asian Cup qualification
30 July 1975	Hong Kong	L	0–2	Kuala Lumpur, Malaysia	Merdeka Tournament
2 August 1975	Malaysia	L	0–2	Kuala Lumpur, Malaysia	Merdeka Tournament
4 August 1975	Bangladesh	W	3–0	Kuala Lumpur, Malaysia	Merdeka Tournament
7 August 1975	Indonesia	W	4–1	Kuala Lumpur, Malaysia	Merdeka Tournament
9 August 1975	South Korea	L	1–3	Kuala Lumpur, Malaysia	Merdeka Tournament
11 August 1975	Thailand	W	4–0	Kuala Lumpur, Malaysia	Merdeka Tournament
14 August 1975	Burma	W	2–0	Kuala Lumpur, Malaysia	Merdeka Tournament
8 September 1975	South Korea	L	0–3	Seoul, South Korea	International Friendly

== 1976 ==
Date	Opponent	Result	Score	Venue	Competition
25 January 1976	Bulgaria	L	1–3	Tokyo National Stadium, Tokyo, Japan	Asahi International Soccer Tournament
28 January 1976	Bulgaria	D	1–1	Nagai Stadium, Osaka, Japan	Asahi International Soccer Tournament
1 February 1976	Bulgaria	L	0–3	Tokyo National Stadium, Tokyo, Japan	Asahi International Soccer Tournament
14 March 1976	Philippines	W	3–0	Tokyo National Stadium, Tokyo, Japan	1976 Olympic Games Qualification
17 March 1976	Philippines	W	3–0	Tokyo National Stadium, Tokyo, Japan	1976 Olympic Games Qualification
21 March 1976	South Korea	L	0–2	Tokyo National Stadium, Tokyo, Japan	1976 Olympic Games Qualification
27 March 1976	South Korea	D	2–2	Seoul, South Korea	1976 Olympic Games Qualification
31 March 1976	Israel	L	0–3	Seoul, South Korea	1976 Olympic Games Qualification
11 April 1976	Israel	L	1–4	Tel Aviv, Israel	1976 Olympic Games Qualification
8 August 1976	India	W	5–1	Kuala Lumpur, Malaysia	Merdeka Tournament
10 August 1976	Indonesia	W	6–0	Kuala Lumpur, Malaysia	Merdeka Tournament
13 August 1976	Burma	D	2–2	Kuala Lumpur, Malaysia	Merdeka Tournament
16 August 1976	Thailand	D	2–2	Kuala Lumpur, Malaysia	Merdeka Tournament
18 August 1976	South Korea	D	0–0	Kuala Lumpur, Malaysia	Merdeka Tournament
20 August 1976	Malaysia	D	2–2	Kuala Lumpur, Malaysia	Merdeka Tournament
22 August 1976	Malaysia	L	0–2	Kuala Lumpur, Malaysia	Merdeka Tournament
4 December 1976	South Korea	L	1–2	Tokyo National Stadium, Tokyo, Japan	International Friendly

== 1977 ==
Date	Opponent	Result	Score	Venue	Competition
6 March 1977	Israel	L	0–2	Tel Aviv, Israel	1978 FIFA World Cup qualification (AFC and OFC)
10 March 1977	Israel	L	0–2	Tel Aviv, Israel	1978 FIFA World Cup qualification (AFC and OFC)
26 March 1977	South Korea	D	0–0	National Olympic Stadium, Tokyo, Japan	1978 FIFA World Cup qualification (AFC and OFC)
3 April 1977	South Korea	L	0–1	Seoul, South Korea	1978 FIFA World Cup qualification (AFC and OFC)
15 June 1977	South Korea	L	1–2	Seoul, South Korea	International Friendly

== 1978 ==
Date	Opponent	Result	Score	Venue	Competition
23 May 1978	Thailand	W	3–0	Mizuho Athletic Stadium, Tokyo, Japan	Kirin Cup
13 July 1978	Iraq	D	0–0	Kuala Lumpur, Malaysia	Merdeka Tournament
15 July 1978	Indonesia	L	1–2	Kuala Lumpur, Malaysia	Merdeka Tournament
17 July 1978	Syria	W	3–2	Kuala Lumpur, Malaysia	Merdeka Tournament
19 July 1978	South Korea	L	0–4	Kuala Lumpur, Malaysia	Merdeka Tournament
21 July 1978	Malaysia	L	1–4	Kuala Lumpur, Malaysia	Merdeka Tournament
23 July 1978	Singapore	L	1–2	Kuala Lumpur, Malaysia	Merdeka Tournament
26 July 1978	Thailand	W	4–0	Kuala Lumpur, Malaysia	Merdeka Tournament
19 November 1978	Soviet Union	L	1–4	National Olympic Stadium, Tokyo, Japan	International Friendly
23 November 1978	Soviet Union	L	1–4	National Olympic Stadium, Tokyo, Japan	International Friendly
26 November 1978	Soviet Union	L	0–3	Osaka Nagai Stadium, Osaka, Japan	International Friendly
11 December 1978	Kuwait	L	0–2	Bangkok, Thailand	1978 Asian Games Football
13 December 1978	Bahrain	W	4–0	Bangkok, Thailand	1978 Asian Games Football
15 December 1978	South Korea	L	1–3	Bangkok, Thailand	1978 Asian Games Football

== 1979 ==
Date	Opponent	Result	Score	Venue	Competition
4 March 1979	South Korea	W	2–1	National Olympic Stadium, Tokyo, Japan	International Friendly
31 May 1979	Indonesia	W	4–0	Nishigaoka Soccer Stadium, Tokyo, Japan	Kirin Cup
16 June 1979	South Korea	L	1–4	Seoul, South Korea	International Friendly
27 June 1979	Malaysia	D	1–1	Kuala Lumpur, Malaysia	Merdeka Tournament
29 June 1979	Thailand	W	2–0	Kuala Lumpur, Malaysia	Merdeka Tournament
1 July 1979	Burma	W	1–0	Kuala Lumpur, Malaysia	Merdeka Tournament
11 July 1979	Indonesia	D	0–0	Kuala Lumpur, Malaysia	Merdeka Tournament
13 July 1979	Singapore	W	3–1	Kuala Lumpur, Malaysia	Merdeka Tournament
23 August 1979	North Korea	D	0–0	Pyongyang, North Korea	International Friendly
