= 1975 Japan Soccer League =

Japan Soccer League
- Season: 1975
- Teams: 10
- Champions: Yanmar Diesel; 3rd title
- Runner up: Mitsubishi Motors
- Matches: 90
- Goals: 268 (2.98 per match)
- Top goalscorer: Kunishige Kamamoto (17 goals)

== League tables ==
=== First Division ===
Towa Real Estate was renamed Fujita Industries when the latter absorbed its subsidiary.

Pos	Team	Pld	W	D	L	GF	GA	GD	Pts	Qualification
1	Yanmar Diesel	18	14	3	1	44	11	+33	31	Champions
2	Mitsubishi Motors	18	13	3	2	30	16	+14	29	
3	Hitachi	18	10	5	3	31	11	+20	25	
4	Nippon Steel	18	9	3	6	28	23	+5	21	
5	Eidai Industries	18	8	2	8	30	29	+1	18	
6	Furukawa Electric	18	6	5	7	34	22	+12	17	
7	Fujita	18	5	3	10	19	31	−12	13	
8	Toyo Industries	18	4	4	10	20	29	−9	12	
9	Nippon Kokan	18	4	3	11	15	32	−17	11	To promotion/relegation Series
10	Toyota Motors	18	0	3	15	17	64	−47	3	To promotion/relegation Series

Source: RSSSF

==== Promotion/relegation Series ====
JSL Division 1	1st leg	2nd leg	JSL Division 2
Nippon Kokan	1-1	1-0	Yomiuri
Toyota Motors	1-0	0-0	Tanabe Pharmaceutical

No relegations.

=== Second Division ===
Pos	Team	Pld	W	D	L	GF	GA	GD	Pts	Qualification
1	Tanabe Pharmaceutical	18	12	3	3	36	17	+19	27	To promotion/relegation Series with Division 1
2	Yomiuri	18	11	4	3	43	16	+27	26	To promotion/relegation Series with Division 1
3	Fujitsu	18	10	6	2	37	17	+20	26	
4	Honda	18	10	2	6	33	29	+4	22	
5	Teijin Matsuyama	18	8	3	7	31	34	−3	19	
6	Kyoto Shiko	18	5	5	8	18	20	−2	15	
7	Kofu SC	18	5	4	9	27	34	−7	14	
8	Sumitomo Metal	18	3	6	9	27	38	−11	12	
9	NTT Kinki	18	4	2	12	25	52	−27	10	To promotion/relegation Series with Senior Cup finalists
10	Dainichi Nippon Cable Industries	18	3	3	12	19	39	−20	9	To promotion/relegation Series with Senior Cup finalists

Source: RSSSF

==== JSL promotion/relegation Series ====
JSL	1st leg	2nd leg	Senior Cup
NTT Kinki	1-2	0-0	Furukawa Electric Chiba (Cup runner-up)
Dainichi Nippon Cable Industries	1-1	0-2	Yanmar Club (Cup winner)

NTT Kinki and Dainichi relegated, Furukawa Chiba and Yanmar Club promoted.
