= Football at the 1970 Asian Games – Men's team squads =

Squads for the Football at the 1970 Asian Games played in Bangkok, Thailand.

== Group A ==
=== India ===
Head coach: (India) Pradip Kumar Banerjee

No.	Pos.	Player	Date of birth (age)	Caps	Goals	Club
	GK	Kuppuswami Sampath	15 September 1947 (aged 23)			(All India Football Federation) Madras Engineering Group
	GK	Bandya Kakade	1945			(All India Football Federation) Bombay
	DF	Altaf Ahmed				(All India Football Federation) Bengal
	DF	Syed Nayeemuddin (c)	1944			(All India Football Federation) Mohun Bagan
	DF	PM Shivdas				(All India Football Federation) Bombay
	DF	Sudhir Karmakar	1948			(All India Football Federation) East Bengal
	DF	Chandreshwar Prasad Singh	31 December 1944 (aged 25)			(All India Football Federation) Mohun Bagan
	DF	Kalyan Saha				(All India Football Federation) Bengal
	DF	NIrmal Sengupta				(All India Football Federation) Bengal
	MF	Hishey "Jerry" Basi				(All India Football Federation) Bombay
	MF	Abdul Latif	20 June 1947 (aged 23)			(All India Football Federation) Bengal
	MF	Doraiswamy Nataraj	1941			(All India Football Federation) Mysore
	MF	Ajaib Singh				(All India Football Federation) Punjab
	FW	Amar Bahadur	18 April 1942 (aged 28)			(All India Football Federation) Mafatlal SC
	FW	Subhash Bhowmick	2 October 1950 (aged 20)			(All India Football Federation) East Bengal
	FW	Sukalyan Ghosh Dastidar	1947			(All India Football Federation) Mohun Bagan
	FW	Mohammed Habib	17 July 1949 (aged 21)			(All India Football Federation) East Bengal
	FW	Magan Singh Rajvi				(All India Football Federation) Rajasthan
	FW	Manjit Singh				(All India Football Federation) Leaders Club
	FW	Shyam Thapa	1 May 1948 (aged 22)			(All India Football Federation) Gorkha Brigade

=== Thailand ===
Head coach: (Thailand) Seraniw Chinwala

No.	Pos.	Player	Date of birth (age)	Club
1	GK	Saravuth Parthipakoranchai	10 April 1950 (aged 20)	(Football Association of Thailand) Bangkok Bank F.C.
3	DF	Narong Sangkasuwan	19 October 1943 (aged 27)	(Football Association of Thailand) Royal Thai Police
4	DF	Chirawat Pimpawatin	30 November 1952 (aged 18)	(Football Association of Thailand) Bangkok Bank F.C.
5	MF	Supakij Meelarpkij	17 July 1945 (aged 25)	
6	MF	Chatchai Paholpat	30 April 1947 (aged 23)	(Football Association of Thailand) Bangkok Bank F.C.
7	DF	Suchin Kawisat		
11	FW	Niwat Srisawat	19 August 1949 (aged 21)	(Football Association of Thailand) Raj-Vithi F.C.
8	DF	Pullop Maklamtong		
9		Vichit Yamboonruang		
10	FW	Preecha Kitboon		
12	FW	Suttha Sudsa-ard		
14	FW	Sahas Pornsawan		

=== South Vietnam ===
Head coach: (South Vietnam) Nguyễn Ngọc Thanh

No.	Pos.	Player	Date of birth (age)	Caps	Goals	Club
1	GK	Lâm Hồng Châu				
2	DF	Lại Văn Ngôn				
3	DF	Hồ Thanh Cang				
4	DF	Huỳnh Văn Chiến				
5	DF	Bùi Thái Huệ				
6	DF	Võ Bá Hùng				
7	MF	Nguyễn Tấn Trung				
8	MF	Nguyễn Văn Mộng	10 October 1946 (aged 24)			
9	MF	Nguyễn Văn Ngôn				
10	MF	Nguyễn Vinh Quang				
11	FW	Cù Sinh				
12	FW	Lê Văn Tám				
13	FW	Dư Tân				
14	FW	Trần Văn Xinh				
15	DF	Nguyễn Thái Hùng				
16	MF	Nguyễn Văn Chiếu				
18	MF	Phạm Huỳnh Tam Lang	14 February 1942 (aged 28)			
19	FW	Phạm Văn Lắm	17 October 1943 (aged 27)			
20	FW	Dương Văn Thà				
21	FW	Đỗ Thới Vinh				

== Group B ==
=== Japan ===
Head coach: (Japan) Shunichiro Okano

No.	Pos.	Player	Date of birth (age)	Club
1	GK	Kenzo Yokoyama	21 January 1943 (aged 27)	(Japan Football Association) Mitsubishi Motors
2	DF	Yoshitada Yamaguchi	28 September 1944 (aged 26)	(Japan Football Association) Hitachi
3	DF	Yoshio Kikugawa	12 September 1944 (aged 26)	(Japan Football Association) Mitsubishi Motors
4	DF	Nobuo Kawakami	24 October 1947 (aged 23)	(Japan Football Association) Rikkyo University
5	MF	Masafumi Hara	21 December 1943 (aged 26)	(Japan Football Association) Nippon Steel
6	MF	Kozo Arai	24 October 1950 (aged 20)	(Japan Football Association) Furukawa Electric
7	MF	Aritatsu Ogi	10 December 1942 (aged 28)	(Japan Football Association) Toyo Industries
8	MF	Kiyoshi Tomizawa	3 December 1943 (aged 27)	(Japan Football Association) Nippon Steel
9	DF	Takaji Mori	24 November 1943 (aged 27)	(Japan Football Association) Mitsubishi Motors
10	FW	Teruki Miyamoto	26 December 1940 (aged 29)	(Japan Football Association) Nippon Steel
11	MF	Eizo Yuguchi	4 July 1945 (aged 25)	(Japan Football Association) Yanmar Diesel
12	MF	Teruo Nimura	2 May 1943 (aged 27)	(Japan Football Association) Toyo Industries
13	FW	Ryuichi Sugiyama	4 July 1941 (aged 29)	(Japan Football Association) Mitsubishi Motors
14	FW	Kunishige Kamamoto	15 April 1944 (aged 26)	(Japan Football Association) Yanmar Diesel
15	FW	Yusuke Omi	26 December 1946 (aged 23)	(Japan Football Association) Hitachi
16	FW	Takeo Kimura	13 May 1947 (aged 23)	(Japan Football Association) Furukawa Electric
17	FW	Tadahiko Ueda	3 August 1947 (aged 23)	(Japan Football Association) Nippon Steel
18	MF	Minoru Kobata	24 November 1946 (aged 24)	(Japan Football Association) Hitachi
19	FW	Kazumi Takada	28 June 1951 (aged 19)	(Japan Football Association) Nihon University
20	GK	Koji Funamoto	12 August 1942 (aged 28)	(Japan Football Association) Toyo Industries

=== Burma ===
Head coach: (Myanmar) U Pe Tin

No.	Pos.	Player	Date of birth (age)	Caps	Goals	Club
1	GK	Tin Aung	8 May 1947 (aged 23)			
2	DF	Maung Maung Myint				
4	DF	Tin Sein	12 June 1951 (aged 19)			
5	DF	Pe Khin				
6	MF	Aye Maung Gyi	20 August 1950 (aged 20)			
16	MF	Aye Maung Lay	10 June 1954 (aged 16)			
8	MF	Ye Nyunt	3 June 1950 (aged 20)			
9	FW	Maung Hla Htay	18 March 1940 (aged 30)			
10	FW	Win Maung	12 May 1949 (aged 21)			
17	FW	Than Soe	3 June 1952 (aged 18)			
14	MF	Soe Paing				
3	DF	Maung Maung Tin	21 May 1949 (aged 21)			
7	MF	Myo Win Nyunt	19 February 1950 (aged 20)			
	FW	Khin Maung Tint	21 September 1940 (aged 30)			
	FW	Tin Aung Moe	12 June 1949 (aged 21)			
	GK	Tin Win				

=== Khmer Republic ===
Head coach: (Cambodia)

No.	Pos.	Player	Date of birth (age)	Caps	Goals	Club
	GK					
	DF					
	DF					
	MF					
	DF					
	MF					
	FW					
	FW					
	FW					
	FW					
	FW					

=== Malaysia ===
Head coach: (Malaysia)

No.	Pos.	Player	Date of birth (age)	Caps	Goals	Club
	GK					
	DF					
	DF					
	MF					
	DF					
	MF					
	FW					
	FW					
	FW					
	FW					
	FW					

== Group C ==
=== South Korea ===
Head coach: (South Korea) Han Hong-ki

No.	Pos.	Player	Date of birth (age)	Club
1	GK	Oh In-bok	26 September 1939 (aged 31)	(Korea Football Association) Korea Housing Bank FC
24	GK	Lee Se-yeon	11 July 1945 (aged 25)	(Korea Football Association) Korea Trust Bank FC
2	DF	Seo Yoon-chan	6 December 1944 (aged 26)	(Korea Football Association) Korea Trust Bank FC
3	DF	Kim Ho	24 November 1944 (aged 26)	(Korea Football Association) Commercial Bank of Korea FC
4	DF	Kim Ki-hyo	19 September 1946 (aged 24)	(Korea Football Association) ROK Marine Corps FC
5	DF	Kim Jung-nam	28 January 1943 (aged 27)	(Korea Football Association) Korea Exchange Bank FC
6	DF	Choi Jae-mo	10 July 1946 (aged 24)	(Korea Football Association) ROK Army FC
8	MF	Park Byung-joo	20 February 1942 (aged 28)	(Korea Football Association) Seoul Bank FC
11	MF	Lim Kook-chan	15 February 1940 (aged 30)	(Korea Football Association) Seoul Bank FC
12	MF	Hong In-woong	29 November 1942 (aged 28)	(Korea Football Association) Chohung Bank FC
14	FW	Lee Hoe-taik	11 October 1946 (aged 24)	(Korea Football Association) Korea Coal Corporation FC
15	FW	Park Lee-chun	26 July 1947 (aged 23)	(Korea Football Association) ROK Army FC
16	FW	Park Soo-il	25 April 1944 (aged 26)	(Korea Football Association) Korea Exchange Bank FC
17	FW	Jeong Kang-ji	5 October 1943 (aged 27)	(Korea Football Association) ROK Army FC
18	FW	Kim Chang-il	16 August 1945 (aged 25)	(Korea Football Association) Korea Tungsten Company FC
20	FW	Chung Kyu-poong	2 August 1947 (aged 23)	(Korea Football Association) ROK Army FC
21	FW	Park Soo-duk	3 July 1948 (aged 22)	(Korea Football Association) Kyung Hee University
22	FW	Kim Ki-bok	20 May 1944 (aged 26)	(Korea Football Association) Chung-Ang University
23	FW	Choi Sang-chul	27 February 1947 (aged 23)	(Korea Football Association) ROK Army FC

=== Indonesia ===
Head coach: (Indonesia) Djamiat Dalhar

No.	Pos.	Player	Date of birth (age)	Club
1	GK	Judo Hadianto	19 September 1941 (aged 29)	(Football Association of Indonesia) Persija Jakarta
2	DF	Juswardi	2 July 1945 (aged 25)	(Football Association of Indonesia) PSMS Medan
3	DF	Sunarto		(Football Association of Indonesia) Persib Bandung
4	DF	Iim Ibrahim		(Football Association of Indonesia) Persija Jakarta
5	DF	Anwar Udjang	2 March 1945 (aged 25)	(Football Association of Indonesia) PSMS Medan
6	DF	Fan Tek Fong (Muljadi/Hadi Muljadi)	19 September 1943 (aged 27)	(Football Association of Indonesia) Persija Jakarta
7	MF	Zulham Yahya		(Football Association of Indonesia) PSMS Medan
8	MF	Bob Permadi		(Football Association of Indonesia)
9	FW	Iswadi Idris	18 March 1948 (aged 22)	(Football Association of Indonesia) Persija Jakarta
10	MF	Abdul Kadir	27 December 1948 (aged 22)	(Football Association of Indonesia) Persebaya Surabaya
11	MF	Surya Lesmana	20 May 1944 (aged 26)	(Football Association of Indonesia) Persija Jakarta
12	GK	Ronny Pasla	15 April 1947 (aged 23)	(Football Association of Indonesia) PSMS Medan
13	MF	M. Basri	5 October 1942 (aged 28)	(Football Association of Indonesia) PSM Makassar
14	MF	Djunaedi Abdillah	21 February 1948 (aged 22)	(Football Association of Indonesia) Persebaya Surabaya
15	MF	Ronny Pattinasarany	09 February 1949 (aged 21)	(Football Association of Indonesia) PSM Makassar
16	FW	Soekarno Wahid		(Football Association of Indonesia) PSM Makassar
17	FW	Soetjipto Soentoro	16 Juny 1941 (aged 29)	(Football Association of Indonesia) Persija Jakarta
18	FW	Waskito	29 January 1949 (aged 21)	(Football Association of Indonesia) Persebaya Surabaya
19	FW	Jacob Sihasale	16 April 1944 (aged 26)	(Football Association of Indonesia) Persebaya Surabaya
20	GK	Soeharsojo	13 August 1948 (aged 22)	(Football Association of Indonesia) Persema Malang

=== Iran ===
Head coach: (Soviet Union) Igor Netto

No.	Pos.	Player	Date of birth (age)	Caps	Goals	Club
1	GK	Nasser Hejazi	14 December 1949 (aged 20)			(Football Federation Islamic Republic of Iran) Taj SC
3	MF	Reza Vatankhah	9 February 1947 (aged 23)			(Football Federation Islamic Republic of Iran) Perspolis F.C.
6	MF	Parviz Ghelichkhani	4 December 1945 (aged 25)			(Football Federation Islamic Republic of Iran) Taj SC
7	MF	Karo Haghverdian				(Football Federation Islamic Republic of Iran) Taj SC
8	FW	Ali Parvin	25 September 1946 (aged 24)			(Football Federation Islamic Republic of Iran) Perspolis F.C.
9	FW	Hossein Kalani	23 January 1945 (aged 25)			(Football Federation Islamic Republic of Iran) Perspolis F.C.
12	FW	Ali Jabbari	20 July 1946 (aged 24)			(Football Federation Islamic Republic of Iran) Taj SC
13	DF	Ebrahim Ashtiani	4 January 1942 (aged 28)			(Football Federation Islamic Republic of Iran) Perspolis F.C.
15	DF	Majid Halvai	7 February 1948 (aged 22)			(Football Federation Islamic Republic of Iran) Pas F.C.
16	MF	Asghar Adibi				(Football Federation Islamic Republic of Iran) Perspolis F.C.
	DF	Mostafa Arab	13 August 1941 (aged 29)			(Football Federation Islamic Republic of Iran) Oghab F.C.
	FW	Asghar Sharafi	22 December 1942 (aged 27)			(Football Federation Islamic Republic of Iran) Pas F.C.
	FW	Fereydoun Moeini	23 August 1946 (aged 28)			(Football Federation Islamic Republic of Iran) Perspolis F.C.
		Mansour Pourhaidari				(Football Federation Islamic Republic of Iran) Taj SC
		Jaffar Kashani				(Football Federation Islamic Republic of Iran) Perspolis F.C.
		Hassan Habibi				(Football Federation Islamic Republic of Iran) Pas F.C.
