= India at the 1970 Asian Games =

- IOC code: IND
- NOC: Indian Olympic Association

in Bangkok
- Medals Ranked 5th: Gold 6 Silver 9 Bronze 10 Total 25

Asian Games appearances (overview)
- 1951; 1954; 1958; 1962; 1966; 1970; 1974; 1978; 1982; 1986; 1990; 1994; 1998; 2002; 2006; 2010; 2014; 2018; 2022; 2026

India participated in the 1970 Asian Games, held in Bangkok, Thailand from 9 to 20 December 1970. Indian athletes won total a 25 medals including six golds and finished at the fifth position in the medal's table.

== Medals by sport ==
Sport	Gold	Silver	Bronze	Total
Athletics	4	5	5	14
Boxing	1	1	0	2
Football	0	0	1	1
Hockey	0	1	0	1
Water polo	0	1	0	1
Wrestling	1	1	3	5
Sailing	0	0	1	1
Total	6	9	10	25

== Football ==
Head coach: (India) G M H Basha

No.	Pos.	Player	Date of birth (age)	Caps	Goals	Club
	GK	Kuppuswami Sampath				(All India Football Federation) Madras Engineering Group
	GK	Bandya Kakade				(All India Football Federation) Bombay
	DF	Altaf Ahmed				(All India Football Federation) Bengal
	DF	Syed Nayeemuddin (c)				(All India Football Federation) Mohun Bagan
	DF	PM Shivdas				(All India Football Federation) Bombay
	DF	Sudhir Karmakar				(All India Football Federation) East Bengal
	DF	Chandreshwar Prasad				(All India Football Federation) Mohun Bagan
	DF	Kalyan Saha				(All India Football Federation) Bengal
	DF	NIrmal Sengupta				(All India Football Federation) Bengal
	MF	Hishey "Jerry" Basi				(All India Football Federation) Bombay
	MF	Abdul Latif				(All India Football Federation) Bengal
	MF	Doraiswamy Nataraj				(All India Football Federation) Mysore
	MF	Ajaib Singh				(All India Football Federation) Punjab
	FW	Amar Bahadur	18 April 1942 (aged 28)			(All India Football Federation) Mafatlal SC
	FW	Subhash Bhowmick	2 October 1950 (aged 20)			(All India Football Federation) East Bengal
	FW	Sukalyan Ghosh Dastidar				(All India Football Federation) Mohun Bagan
	FW	Mohammed Habib	17 July 1949 (aged 21)			(All India Football Federation) East Bengal
	FW	Magan Singh Rajvi				(All India Football Federation) Rajasthan
	FW	Manjit Singh				(All India Football Federation) Leaders Club
	FW	Shyam Thapa	1 May 1948 (aged 22)			(All India Football Federation) Gorkha Brigade

=== Preliminary round ===
Team	Pld	W	D	L	GF	GA	GD	Pts
India	2	1	1	0	4	2	+2	3
Thailand	2	1	1	0	3	2	+1	3
South Vietnam	2	0	0	2	0	3	−3	0

10 December

India	2–2	Thailand
Bhowmick 35', 57'		Sahas 13'; Preecha 21'

Bangkok

11 December

India	2–0	South Vietnam
Habib 76'; Rajvi 85'

Bangkok

=== Quarterfinals ===
Team	Pld	W	D	L	GF	GA	GD	Pts
Japan	2	2	0	0	3	1	+2	4
India	2	1	0	1	3	1	+2	2
Indonesia	2	0	0	2	1	5	−4	0

15 December

India	3–0	Indonesia
Nataraj 74'; Rajvi 79'; Thapa 83'

Bangkok

17 December

Japan	1–0	India
Kimura 88'	Report

Bangkok

=== Semifinals ===
18 December

Burma	2–0	India
Ye Nyunt 15', 48'

Bangkok

=== Bronze medal match ===
19 December

Japan	0–1	India
	Report	Manjit Singh 36'

Bangkok
