= 1970 in Japanese football =

1971 season

Japanese football in 1970

== Japan Soccer League ==
| Pos | Team | Pld | W | D | L | GF | GA | GD | Pts | Qualification |
|---|---|---|---|---|---|---|---|---|---|---|
| 1 | Toyo Industries | 14 | 11 | 1 | 2 | 33 | 5 | +28 | 23 | Champions |
| 2 | Mitsubishi Motors | 14 | 7 | 4 | 3 | 24 | 13 | +11 | 18 | |
| 3 | Hitachi | 14 | 6 | 4 | 4 | 21 | 18 | +3 | 16 | |
| 4 | Yanmar Diesel | 14 | 7 | 1 | 6 | 26 | 21 | +5 | 15 | |
| 5 | Furukawa Electric | 14 | 5 | 4 | 5 | 21 | 21 | 0 | 14 | |
| 6 | Nippon Steel | 14 | 5 | 3 | 6 | 31 | 29 | +2 | 13 | |
| 7 | Nippon Kokan | 14 | 3 | 2 | 9 | 14 | 38 | −24 | 8 | To Promotion/relegation Series |
| 8 | Nagoya Mutual Bank | 14 | 1 | 3 | 10 | 9 | 34 | −25 | 5 | To Promotion/relegation Series |

== Emperor's Cup ==
January 1, 1971

| Yanmar Diesel | 2–1 | Toyo Industries |
|---|---|---|
| ? (?) ? (?) | | ? (?) |

National Stadium

== National team ==
=== Results ===
| 1970.07.31 | Japan | 1–2 | Hong Kong | Kuala Lumpur, Malaysia |
| | Kimura 3' | JFA | ? (?) ? (?) |

| 1970.08.02 | Japan | 1–1 | South Korea | Kuala Lumpur, Malaysia |
| | Kimura 59' | JFA | ? (?) |

| 1970.08.04 | Japan | 0–0 | Thailand | Kuala Lumpur, Malaysia |
| | | JFA |

| 1970.08.08 | Japan | 4–3 | Indonesia | Kuala Lumpur, Malaysia |
| | Yoshimizu 40'; Ogi 72', 75'; Omi 80' | JFA | ? (?) ? (?) ? (?) |

| 1970.08.10 | Japan | 4–0 | Singapore | Kuala Lumpur, Malaysia |
| | Ueda 41', 66'; Sugiyama 64'; Yoshimura 70' | JFA |

| 1970.08.16 | Japan | 3–2 | Chinese Taipei | Kuala Lumpur, Malaysia |
| | Ueda 8', 66', 70' | JFA | ? (?) ? (?) |

| 1970.12.10 | Japan | 1–0 | Malaysia | Bangkok, Thailand |
| | Kamamoto 34' | JFA | | Attendance: 4,500 |

| 1970.12.12 | Japan | 1–0 | Khmer | Bangkok, Thailand |
| | Yuguchi 56' | JFA | | Attendance: 7,000 |

| 1970.12.14 | Japan | 2–1 | Burma | Bangkok, Thailand |
| | T. Miyamoto 49'; Ueda 75' | JFA | ? (?) | Attendance: 10,000 |

| 1970.12.16 | Japan | 2–1 | Indonesia | Bangkok, Thailand |
| | Kamamoto 42', 69' | JFA | ? (?) | Attendance: 30,000 |

| 1970.12.17 | Japan | 1–0 | India | Bangkok, Thailand |
| | Kimura 88' | JFA | | Attendance: 4,000 |

| 1970.12.18 | Japan | 1–2 (a.e.t.) | South Korea | Bangkok, Thailand |
| | Ueda 73' | JFA | ? (?) ? (?) | Attendance: 25,000 |

| 1970.12.19 | Japan | 0–1 | India | Bangkok, Thailand |
| | | JFA | ? (?) | Attendance: 6,000 |

=== Players statistics ===
| Player | -1969 | 07.31 | 08.02 | 08.04 | 08.08 | 08.10 | 08.16 | 12.10 | 12.12 | 12.14 | 12.16 | 12.17 | 12.18 | 12.19 | 1970 | Total |
| Teruki Miyamoto | 40(17) | O | O | O | O | O | O | O | O | O(1) | O | - | O | O | 12(1) | 52(18) |
| Ryuichi Sugiyama | 39(12) | O | O | O | O | O(1) | O | O | O | - | O | - | O | O | 11(1) | 50(13) |
| Aritatsu Ogi | 23(5) | O | O | O | O(2) | O | O | O | O | O | O | O | O | O | 13(2) | 36(7) |
| Yoshitada Yamaguchi | 23(0) | O | O | O | O | O | O | O | O | O | O | - | O | O | 12(0) | 35(0) |
| Kenzo Yokoyama | 22(0) | O | O | O | O | O | O | O | O | O | - | O | O | O | 12(0) | 34(0) |
| Kunishige Kamamoto | 21(28) | - | - | - | - | - | - | O(1) | O | O | O(2) | - | O | O | 6(3) | 27(31) |
| Takaji Mori | 17(1) | O | O | O | O | O | O | O | O | O | O | O | O | O | 13(0) | 30(1) |
| Yasuyuki Kuwahara | 11(5) | O | - | - | - | - | - | - | - | - | - | - | - | - | 1(0) | 12(5) |
| Takeo Kimura | 6(1) | O(1) | O(1) | O | O | - | O | O | - | - | - | O(1) | O | - | 8(3) | 14(4) |
| Kiyoshi Tomizawa | 4(0) | - | - | - | - | - | - | - | - | O | O | - | - | - | 2(0) | 6(0) |
| Koji Funamoto | 3(0) | - | - | - | - | - | - | - | - | - | O | - | - | - | 1(0) | 4(0) |
| Yoshio Kikugawa | 2(0) | O | O | O | O | O | O | O | O | O | - | O | O | O | 12(0) | 14(0) |
| Eizo Yuguchi | 1(0) | - | - | - | - | - | - | O | O(1) | - | - | O | O | - | 4(1) | 5(1) |
| Minoru Kobata | 0(0) | O | - | O | O | O | O | - | O | O | O | O | O | O | 11(0) | 11(0) |
| Tadahiko Ueda | 0(0) | - | O | O | O | O(2) | O(3) | - | - | O(1) | O | O | O(1) | O | 10(7) | 10(7) |
| Kozo Arai | 0(0) | - | - | - | - | - | - | O | O | O | O | O | O | - | 6(0) | 6(0) |
| Yusuke Omi | 0(0) | - | - | O | O(1) | O | - | - | - | O | O | - | - | - | 5(1) | 5(1) |
| Masafumi Hara | 0(0) | O | O | O | O | - | - | - | - | - | - | O | - | - | 5(0) | 5(0) |
| Teruo Nimura | 0(0) | - | - | - | - | - | - | O | O | - | O | O | - | O | 5(0) | 5(0) |
| Norio Yoshimizu | 0(0) | O | - | - | O(1) | O | O | - | - | - | - | - | - | - | 4(1) | 4(1) |
| Nelson Yoshimura | 0(0) | - | O | O | - | O(1) | O | - | - | - | - | - | - | - | 4(1) | 4(1) |
| Nobuo Kawakami | 0(0) | O | - | - | - | O | - | - | - | - | - | O | - | O | 4(0) | 4(0) |
| Kazumi Takada | 0(0) | - | - | - | - | - | - | - | O | O | - | O | - | O | 4(0) | 4(0) |

== Births ==
- 6 August: Yutaka Akita
