= 1946 in Japanese football =

1946 season

Japanese football in 1946.

== Emperor's Cup ==
May 5, 1946

University of Tokyo LB	6–2	Kobe University of Economics Club

University of Tokyo Goten-Shita Stadium

== Births ==
- January 21 - Ichiro Hosotani
- February 28 - Hiroshi Ochiai
- August 21 - Norio Yoshimizu
- November 24 - Minoru Kobata
- December 26 - Yusuke Omi

== Deaths ==
- April 12 - Teizo Takeuchi (aged 37)
