= 1978 Indian Federation Cup final =

- Event: 1978 Indian Federation Cup
East Bengal	Mohun Bagan
0	0
- Joint winners
- Date: 7 May 1978; 9 May 1978 (replay)
- Venue: Jawaharlal Nehru Stadium, Coimbatore, Tamil Nadu

The 1978 Indian Federation Cup final was the 2nd final of the Indian Federation Cup, the top knock-out competition in India, and was contested between Kolkata giants East Bengal and Mohun Bagan on 7 May 1978 and the replay on 9 May 1978 at the Jawaharlal Nehru Stadium in Coimbatore, Tamil Nadu.

Both the teams were announced as joint winners after both the matches ended 0–0 after full time.

== Route to the final ==
East Bengal				Round	Mohun Bagan			
Opponent	Result			Quarter Final Group League	Opponent	Result		
Rajasthan Police	5–0			Matchday 1	Premier Tyres	0–0		
Mafatlal	2–1			Matchday 2	HAL	8–0		
ITI	2–0			Matchday 3	JCT	1–1		
Opponent	Agg.	1st leg	2nd leg	Knockout Stage	Opponent	Agg.	1st leg	2nd leg
JCT	3–0	1–0	2–0	Semi–Final	ITI	2–2 (7–6 p)	2–0	0–2

== Match ==
=== Summary ===
The Federation Cup final began at the Jawaharlal Nehru Stadium in Coimbatore on 7 May 1978 in front of a packed crowd as two Kolkata giants East Bengal and Mohun Bagan faced each other in the Kolkata Derby. Ranjit Mukherjee's header came off the crossbar in the opening minutes of the game as East Bengal created more chances in the first half while Mohun Bagan was dominant in the second half. Shibaji Banerjee of Mohun Bagan was shown a yellow card for time wasting while Surajit Sengupta of East Bengal was carded for a foul on Dilip Palit in the second half of the game. Both teams canceled each other out as none of them was able to break the deadlock and the game ended in a 0–0 stalemate. The final was replayed on 9 May 1978 and once again the game ended in a 0–0 draw and both the teams were announced as joint winners, with both East Bengal and Mohun Bagan won their first-ever Federation Cup title.

=== Details ===
7 May 1978
14:30 IST

East Bengal	0–0	Mohun Bagan

Jawaharlal Nehru Stadium, Coimbatore
Attendance: 20,000 (est.)

East Bengal	Mohun Bagan

GK	(India) Bhaskar Ganguly
LB	(India) Satyajit Mitra
CB	(India) Monoranjan Bhattacharya
CB	(India) Shyamal Ghosh
RB	(India) Chinmay Chatterjee
CM	(India) Prasanta Banerjee
CM	(India) Samaresh CHowdhury
RW	(India) Surajit Sengupta (c)	Substituted off
LW	(India) Narayanswami Ulaganathan
ST	(India) Tapan Das
ST	(India) Ranjit Mukherjee
Substitutes:
CM	(India) Mihir Bose	Substituted in
Head Coach:
(India) Arun Ghosh

GK	(India) Shibaji Banerjee
RB	(India) Sudhir Karmakar	Substituted off
CB	(India) Shyamal Banerjee
CB	(India) Subrata Bhattacharya
LB	(India) Dilip Palit
CM	(India) Gautam Sarkar
CM	(India) Prasun Banerjee (c)
RW	(India) Manas Bhattacharya	Substituted off
LW	(India) Bidesh Bose
ST	(India) Shyam Thapa
ST	(India) Subhash Bhowmick
Substitutes:
CB	(India) Pradip Chowdhury	Substituted in
ST	(India) Mohammed Habib	Substituted in
Head coach:
(India) P. K. Banerjee

==== Replay ====
9 May 1978
14:30 IST

East Bengal	0–0	Mohun Bagan

Jawaharlal Nehru Stadium, Coimbatore
Attendance: 20,000 (est.)

Match rules

- 90 minutes.
- Replay if match ends in a draw
- Joint winners if both finals ends in a draw

== See also ==
- India - List of Federation Cup Winners
