= 1978–79 Durand Cup final =

- Event: 1978–79 Durand Cup
East Bengal	Mohun Bagan
3	0
- Date: 17 January 1979
- Venue: Ambedkar Stadium, New Delhi, India
- Referee: J. P. Coutinho
- Attendance: 20,000 (estd.)

The 1978–79 Durand Cup final was the 74th final of the Durand Cup, the oldest football competition in India, and was contested between Kolkata giants East Bengal and Mohun Bagan on 17 January 1979 at the Ambedkar Stadium in New Delhi.

East Bengal won the final 3–0 to claim their 8th Durand Cup title. Surajit Sengupta, Mihir Bose and Tapan Das scored the three goals in the final as East Bengal lifted their eighth Durand Cup title.

== Route to the final ==
East Bengal		Round	Mohun Bagan	
Opponent	Result	Quarter Final Group League	Opponent	Result
Indian Air Force	2–1	Matchday 1	Kidderpore	4–0
Orkay Club	0–0	Matchday 2	Tiliam	5–1
JCT	3–0	Matchday 3	Mafatlal	2–2; 2–0
Opponent	Result	Knockout Stage	Opponent	Result
Mafatlal	2–0	Semi–Final	JCT	0–0; 4–2

== Match ==
=== Summary ===
The Durand Cup final began at the Ambedkar Stadium in New Delhi on 17 January 1979 in front of a packed crowd as Kolkata giants East Bengal and Mohun Bagan faced each other in a Kolkata Derby. East Bengal reached their tenth Durand Cup final after defeating Mafatlal 2–0 in the semi-final, having won the tournament seven times previously in 1951, 1952, 1956, 1960, 1967, 1970, and 1972. Mohun Bagan reached their thirteenth Durand Cup final after they defeated JCT 4–2 in the semi-final, having won the tournament eight times previously in 1953, 1959, 1960, 1963, 1964, 1965, 1974, and 1977.

East Bengal dominated the proceedings from the start and took the lead early in the fifteenth minute when Surajit Sengupta dribbled past the Mohun Bagan defence to score with a powerful shot to make it 1–0. East Bengal doubled their lead in the thirty-sixth minute when Surajit Sengupta found Mihir Bose unmarked inside the box who made no errors to make it 2–0 before halftime. East Bengal scored their third with just four minutes remaining when Surajit Sengupta once again played a perfect pass to unmarked Tapan Das inside the box who made the scoreline 3–0 as East Bengal lifted their eighth Durand Cup title.

=== Details ===
17 January 1979
15:00 IST

East Bengal	3–0	Mohun Bagan
Sengupta 15'; Bose 36'; Das 86'

Ambedkar Stadium, New Delhi
Attendance: 20,000 (est.)
Referee: J. P. Coutinho

East Bengal	Mohun Bagan

GK	(India) Bhaskar Ganguly
LB	(India) Satyajit Mitra
CB	(India) Monoranjan Bhattacharya
CB	(India) Shyamal Ghosh
RB	(India) Chinmay Chatterjee
CM	(India) Prasanta Banerjee
CM	(India) Samaresh CHowdhury
RW	(India) Surajit Sengupta (c)
LW	(India) Narayanswami Ulaganathan	Substituted off
ST	(India) Mihir Bose
ST	(India) Shabbir Ali
Substitutes:
FW	(India) Tapan Das	Substituted in
Head Coach:
(India) Arun Ghosh

GK	(India) Shibaji Banerjee
RB	(India) Sudhir Karmakar
CB	(India) Shyamal Banerjee
CB	(India) Compton Dutta
LB	(India) Pradip Chowdhury
CM	(India) Gautam Sarkar
CM	(India) Prasun Banerjee (c)
RW	(India) Manas Bhattacharya	Substituted off
LW	(India) Bidesh Bose
ST	(India) Shyam Thapa	Substituted off
ST	(India) Mohammed Habib
Substitutes:
ST	(India) Mohammed Akbar	Substituted in
ST	(India) Subhash Bhowmick	Substituted in
Head coach:
(India) P. K. Banerjee

Match rules

- 90 minutes.
- Replay if scores still level.
