= 1980 Indian Federation Cup final =

- Event: 1980 Indian Federation Cup
East Bengal	Mohun Bagan
1	1
- Joint winners
- Date: 8 May 1980
- Venue: Eden Gardens, Kolkata, West Bengal
- Referee: J. P. Coutinho (Maharashtra)

The 1980 Indian Federation Cup final was the 4th final of the Indian Federation Cup, the top knock-out competition in India, and was contested between Kolkata giants East Bengal and Mohun Bagan on 8 May 1980 at the Eden Gardens in Kolkata.

Both the teams were announced as joint winners after the match ended 1–1 after the regulation time.

== Route to the final ==
East Bengal				Round	Mohun Bagan			
Opponent	Result			Group stage	Opponent	Result		
HAL	2–1			Matchday 1	Salgaocar	2–0		
Mafatlal	2–0			Matchday 2	ITI	2–0		
Dempo	3–0			Matchday 3	JCT	2–1		
Opponent	Agg.	1st leg	2nd leg	Knockout Stage	Opponent	Agg.	1st leg	2nd leg
Punjab Police	4–1	3–0	1–1	Semi–Final	Mohammedan Sporting	2–2 (4–2 p)	1–1	1–1

== Match ==
=== Summary ===
The Federation Cup final began at the Eden Gardens in Kolkata in front of a packed crowd as two Kolkata giants East Bengal and Mohun Bagan faced each other in the Kolkata Derby. The match for fierce and full of fights, as both teams played a physical game. Referee J. P. Coutinho had to flash out four yellow cards to the players: Majid Bishkar, Jamshid Nassiri, Kajal Chatterjee, and Compton Dutta. East Bengal scored the first goal of the match after Mohammed Habib scored in the twenty-fourth minute of the match with a powerful header from an unmarked position inside the box from a corner kick. Mohun Bagan equalized in the sixty-sixth minute after Mihir Bose scored with a half-volley from inside the box. The match ended 1–1 in regulation time but as prior decided, the extra 15 minutes were not played and both the teams were announced as joint champions of the Federation Cup. Referee J. P. Coutinho explained the decision was taken due to poor visibility and lack of lights.

=== Details ===
8 May 1980
14:30 IST

East Bengal	1–1	Mohun Bagan
Habib 24'		Bose 66'

Eden Gardens, Kolkata
Attendance: 60,000 (est.)
Referee: J. P. Coutinho (Maharashtra)

East Bengal	Mohun Bagan

GK	(India) Nasir Ahmed
LB	(India) Satyajit Mitra (c)
CB	(India) Monoranjan Bhattacharya
CB	(India) Samar Bhattacharya
RB	(India) Thomas Matthew
CM	(India) Kajal Chatterjee (yellow card)
CM	(India) Mohammed Habib	(substituted off) 80'
RW	(India) Tapan Das
LW	(Iran) Mahmood Khabazi (yellow card)
ST	(Iran) Majid Bishkar (yellow card)
ST	(Iran) Jamshid Nassiri
Substitutes:
CM	(India) Bivash Sarkar	(substituted on) 80'
Head Coach:
(India) P. K. Banerjee

GK	(India) Pratap Ghosh
RB	(India) Sanjib Chowdhury
CB	(India) Compton Dutta (yellow card)
CB	(India) Subrata Bhattacharya
LB	(India) Shyamal Banerjee
CM	(India) Gautam Sarkar (c)
CM	(India) Prasun Banerjee
RW	(India) Manas Bhattacharya
LW	(India) Xavier Pius	(substituted off) 81'
ST	(India) Mihir Bose
ST	(India) Bidesh Bose
Substitutes:
ST	(India) Shyam Thapa	(substituted on) 81'
Head coach:
(India) Arun Ghosh

Match rules

- 90 minutes.
- 15 minutes of extra time if necessary.

== See also ==
- India - List of Federation Cup Winners
