= 1959–60 Santosh Trophy =

National Football Championship

Tournament details
- Country: India
- Dates: October 1959

Final positions
- Champions: Bengal (10th title)
- Runners-up: Bombay
- 70 minute matches

The 1959–60 Santosh Trophy was the sixteenth edition of the Santosh Trophy, the main territorial football competition in India. It was held in Nowgong, Assam. Bengal defeated Bombay 3–1 in the final to retain the title.

Hyderabad team competed under the name Andhra Pradesh from this season.

== Preliminary Round ==
=== North Zone ===
Pos	Team	Pld	W	D	L	GF	GA	GD	Pts	Qualification
1	Services	3	3	0	0	9	1	+8	6	Advance to the final round
2	Uttar Pradesh	3	2	0	1	3	2	+1	4	Advance to the final round
3	Delhi	3	1	0	2	7	7	0	2	
4	Madhya Pradesh	3	0	0	3	3	12	−9	0	

Source: rsssf
2 October 1959

Services	2–0	Uttar Pradesh
Lahiri

Jabalpur
3 October 1959

Delhi	7–2	Madhya Pradesh

Jabalpur
4 October 1959

Services	3–0	Delhi
Thapa; Ethiraj

Jabalpur
5 October 1959

Uttar Pradesh	1–0	Madhya Pradesh
Gupta

Jabalpur
6 October 1959

Services	4–1	Madhya Pradesh
Thapa; Subba; Lahiri		???

Jabalpur
7 October 1959

Uttar Pradesh	2–0	Delhi
Kharole

Jabalpur

=== East Zone ===
Pos	Team	Pld	W	D	L	GF	GA	GD	Pts	Qualification
1	Assam	2	1	1	0	1	0	+1	3	Advance to the final round
2	Bengal	2	1	0	1	5	1	+4	2	Advance to the final round
3	Orissa	2	0	1	1	0	5	−5	1	

Source: rsssf
29 September 1959

Orissa	0–0	Assam

Cuttack
2 October 1959

Assam	1–0	Bengal
Bora

Burnpur
2 October 1959

Bengal	5–0	Orissa
Balaram; Goswami; Kannan

Burnpur

=== West Zone ===
Pos	Team	Pld	W	D	L	GF	GA	GD	Pts	Qualification
1	Bombay	3	1	2	0	0	0	0	4	Advance to the final round
2	Bihar	3	1	2	0	6	3	+3	4	Advance to the final round
3	Rajasthan	3	1	1	1	0	0	0	3	
4	Punjab	3	0	1	2	3	5	−2	1	

Source: rsssf
29 September 1959

Bihar	3–0	Rajasthan

Patna
30 September 1959

Bombay	1–0	Punjab
Jaffar

Patna
2 October 1959

Bombay	v	Rajasthan

Hazaribagh
3 October 1959

Bihar	2–2	Punjab

Hazaribagh
5 October 1959

Rajasthan	2–1	Punjab
Ganga Singh; Waris		Budhram

Jamshedpur
6 October 1959

Bihar	1–1	Bombay
Jabbar		Devadaas

Jamshedpur

=== South Zone ===
Pos	Team	Pld	W	D	L	GF	GA	GD	Pts	Qualification
1	Andhra Pradesh	3	2	1	0	4	1	+3	5	Advance to the final round
2	Kerala	3	1	2	0	2	1	+1	4	Advance to the final round
3	Mysore	3	1	0	2	4	6	−2	2	
4	Madras	3	0	1	2	3	5	−2	1	

Source: rsssf
27 September 1959

Mysore	3–2	Madras

Bangalore
29 September 1959

Kerala	2–0	Andhra Pradesh

Bangalore

Abandoned in the second half due to rain

30 September 1959

Andhra Pradesh	2–1	Madras
Yousuf; Kanickdas		Siva

Bangalore
1 October 1959

Kerala	2–1	Mysore
Pappachan; George		Mujeebullah

Bangalore
3 October 1959

Kerala	0–0	Madras

Bangalore
4 October 1959

Andhra Pradesh	2–0	Mysore
Saleh jr; Kanickdas

Bangalore
5 October 1959

Kerala	0–0	Andhra Pradesh

Bangalore

== Final Round ==
=== Section I ===
Pos	Team	Pld	W	D	L	GF	GA	GD	Pts	Qualification
1	Bengal	3	3	0	0	13	0	+13	6	Advance to semifinals
2	Andhra Pradesh	3	2	0	1	10	4	+6	4	Advance to semifinals
3	Bihar	3	1	0	2	5	10	−5	2	
4	Uttar Pradesh	3	0	0	3	2	16	−14	0	

Source: rsssf
16 October 1959

Bengal	3–0	Bihar
Rahmatullah

Nowgong Stadium
17 October 1959

Andhra Pradesh	4–1	Uttar Pradesh
Hamid; Gulzar; Kankidas		Kaiser

Nowgong Stadium
20 October 1959

Andhra Pradesh	6–0	Bihar
Gulzar; Zulfikar; Jaffar

Nowgong Stadium
21 October 1959

Bengal	7–0	Uttar Pradesh
Damodaran; Goswami; Rahmatullah; Balaram

Nowgong Stadium
23 October 1959

Bihar	5–1	Uttar Pradesh
Bidhan; P. Chatterjee (pen.); Ganesh		Kaiser

Nowgong Stadium
25 October 1959

Bengal	3–0	Andhra Pradesh
Rahmatullah; Varhalu; Damodaran

Nowgong Stadium

=== Section II ===
Pos	Team	Pld	W	D	L	GF	GA	GD	Pts	Qualification
1	Bombay	3	2	1	0	5	0	+5	5	Advance to semifinals
2	Services	3	1	2	0	5	1	+4	4	Advance to semifinals
3	Assam	3	0	2	1	2	3	−1	2	
4	Kerala	3	0	1	2	1	9	−8	1	

Source: rsssf
15 October 1959

Bombay	1–0	Assam
Derek D'Souza

Nowgong Stadium
18 October 1959

Services	1–1	Assam
Kazipmi		Riaz Ali

Nowgong Stadium
19 October 1959

Bombay	4–0	Kerala
John Charles; Joe D'sa; Derek D'Souza

Nowgong Stadium
22 October 1959

Services	4–0	Kerala
Puran Bahadur Thapa; Kazipmi; Lahiri

Nowgong Stadium
24 October 1959

Services	0–0	Bombay

Nowgong Stadium
26 October 1959

Kerala	1–1	Assam
George		S.Nongbri

Nowgong Stadium

== Semifinal ==
28 October 1959

Bombay	2–0	Andhra Pradesh
Derek D'Souza; Joe D'sa

Nowgong Stadium
29 October 1959

Bengal	2–1	Services
P. K. Banerjee; Damodaran		Puran Bahadur Thapa

Nowgong Stadium

== Third place match ==
30 October 1959

Services	1–0	Andhra Pradesh
Kazipmi

Nowgong Stadium

== Final ==
31 October 1959

Bengal	3–1	Bombay
Balaram 30'; P. K. Banerjee 31'; Chandrasekhar 70' (o.g.)		1' Jaffar

Nowgong Stadium
Attendance: 22,000
Referee: C.P. Mathur (Rajasthan)
