= 1969–70 Santosh Trophy =

Tournament details
- Country: India
- Dates: October 1969

Final positions
- Champions: Bengal (12th title)
- Runners-up: Services

Tournament statistics
- Top goal scorer: Mohammed Habib (11 goals)

The 1969–70 Santosh Trophy was the 26th edition of the Santosh Trophy, the main State competition for football in India. It was held in 1969 in Nowgong, Assam. Bengal beat Services 6–1 in the final; Mohammed Habib scored five of the goals.

== Early rounds ==
21 September 1969

Tripura	7–2	Uttar Pradesh
Ranjit Das; Moni Singh; Dharma Chetri		Kesab Lal; Sushil

Nowgong Stadium

Tripura led 4-1 at half-time, all four goals scored by Das. The tournament was inaugurated by S.K. Dutta, the Chief Justice of Assam and Nagaland

23 September 1969

Assam	6–2	Tripura
Balaram; Somraj; Kamalnath		Dhiren Chaterji

Nowgong Stadium

1-1 at half time

26 September 1969

Madhya Pradesh	2–1	Haryana

Nowgong Stadium

1-1 at half time

28 September 1969

Orissa	7–0	Gujarat
Kabir; Manmath Singh; Halim; Bau Talim; Promode Saha

Nowgong Stadium

Orissa led 4-0 at half time.

4 October 1969

Goa	7–1	Kerala
Lobo; Dominic; Catao		Joseph Raju (pen.)

Nowgong Stadium

Goa led 7-0 at half-time. Lobo scored the first four goals

== Pre quarter-finals ==
27 September 1969

Services	3–0	Punjab
Shyam Thapa 11'; Aziz 62', 85'

Nowgong Stadium
1 October 1969

Andhra Pradesh	8–0	Rajasthan
Akbar 3' 31' 32' 72'; Ram Mohan 41'; Jankiram; Amarchand; Jaffar

Nowgong Stadium

Rajasthan captain Bhoor Singh was sent off in the second half for hitting Jaffar in the face.Andhra led 4-0 at half time.

3 October 1969

Railways	3–2	Delhi
Arumainayagam; S Nandy; S Das		Krishna Sen; Harinder Singh

Nowgong Stadium
5 October 1969

Mysore	2–0	Madhya Pradesh
Ulaganathan 18' 41'

Nowgong Stadium
6 October 1969

Madras	5–0	Bihar
Johnson 9'; Padmanabhan 10', 81'; Victor

Nowgong Stadium

Madras 3-0 at half time.

7 October 1969

Bengal	4–0	Goa
Pranab Ganguly; Habib; Biman Lahiri

Nowgong Stadium

Bengal 1-0 at half time.

== Quarter-finals ==
29 September 1969

Services	3–0	Assam
Shyam Thapa 30', 33'; Aziz 24'

Nowgong Stadium

Shyam Thapa provided the assist for Aziz's goal.

8 October 1969

Andhra	2–1	Maharashtra
Akbar 6'; Jaffer 72'		Naidu 50'

Nowgong Stadium
9 October 1969

Mysore	2–0	Railways
Ulaganathan 34'; Kosalram

Nowgong Stadium
10 October 1969

Bengal	8–0	Madras
Ghosh Dastidar 7' 10' (?); Habib; Biman Lahiri; Pranab Ganguly

Nowgong Stadium

Bengal led 5-0 at half-time. The match was played on a rain-soaked, slow pitch.

== Semi-finals ==
Team 1	Agg.	Team 2	1st leg	2nd leg
Services	4–1	Mysore	2–0	2–1
Bengal	10–1	Andhra Pradesh	4–1	6–0

=== Matches ===
11 October 1969

Services	2–0	Mysore
Aziz 28' (pen.)

Nowgong Stadium

Services received the penalty after Prabhakar fouled Shyam Thapa. Aziz scored in both halfs.

13 October 1969

Services	2–1	Mysore
Shyam Thapa 3', 14'		Kosalram

Nowgong Stadium
Referee: Ganguly

Services won 4–1 on aggregate. Aziz and Williams provided assists for Thapa. Several players were injured including Herrick of Services (11th minute) and Ulaganathan of Mysore (31st minutes) who were carried off the field with leg injuries.

12 October 1969

Bengal	4–1	Andhra Pradesh
Pranab Ganguly 56', 73'; Parimal Dey; P Mazumdar 88'		Sebastian 57'

Nowgong Stadium
14 October 1969

Bengal	6–0	Andhra Pradesh
Pranab Ganguly 43', 59'; Ghosh Dastidar 55'; Biman Lahiri; Habib

Nowgong Stadium
Referee: P. Namasivayam (Tamil Nadu)

Bengal won 10–1 on aggregate. Ghosh Dastidar was sent off in the 13th minute of the second half for kicking Habeeb Khan.

== Final ==
16 October 1969

Bengal	6–1	Services
Habib 16' 54' 81'; Biman Lahiri 48'		Bir Bahadur 77'

Nowgong Stadium
Referee: Babul Burmese (Assam)

Habib's five goals is the most scored in a Santosh Trophy final.

Bengal scored the first goal when a freekick by Pranab Ganguly shot up in the air off Ghosh Dastidar's body and Habib deflected it into the empty net. Services missed a chance a minute later when Aziz's shot was saved off the line by Kalyan Saha. Habib provided the assist for Lahiri for the second goal and Lahiri provided the assist for the next. Habib's third goal came from a solo run and the fourth from a pass by substitute Sitesh Das.

- Bengal : Balai Dey, Sudhir Karmakar, Kalyan Saha, Ashok Banerjee, Santo Mitra, Kalon Guha, Priyalal Mazumdar, Bimal Lahiri (Sitesh Das), S Ghosh Dastidar, Habib, Pranab Ganguly
- Services : Jeet Bahadur, Nelson Bose, Khairuddin, Sajwan (Bir Bahadur), Rajesh Kumar, Narsingh Gurang, AJ Paul, K Williams, Shyam Thapa, Aziz, PB Saha (Harikrishen)

== Squads ==
- Kerala : Pradeep, Hameed and Pappachan; CR Balakrishnan(C), Jos Ulahannan, GK Subramaniam, Abubacker, MO Jose and Jaffer; Jose Augustine, PV Ramakrishnan and Prasannan; KG Vijayan, Alphonso, Sreenivasan, Joseph, Williams and Raghavan Nair
- Madras : R.Mohan, Dhananjayan, Cletus (State Bank); P.Krishnan, J.R.Williams, T. Thangaraj, A.H.Mallick (Wimco); P.M.Radhakrishnan, T.Gangadharan, K.B.Mohanavelu, M.Padmanadhan, M.Annadorai, S.Victor (Reserve Bank); A.Palaniswamy, Sriramulu (ICF); Gabriel Joseph (Air Force)
