= 1946 Emperor's Cup final =

1946 Emperor's Cup Final
University of Tokyo LB	Kobe University of Economics Club
6	2
- Date: May 5, 1946
- Venue: University of Tokyo Goten-Shita Stadium, Tokyo

1946 Emperor's Cup Final was the 26th final of the Emperor's Cup competition. The final was played at University of Tokyo Goten-Shita Stadium in Tokyo on May 5, 1946. University of Tokyo LB won the championship.

== Overview ==
University of Tokyo LB won the championship, by defeating Kobe University of Economics Club 6–2.

== Match details ==
May 5, 1946

University of Tokyo LB	6–2	Kobe University of Economics Club
? (?) ? (?) ? (?) ? (?) ? (?) ? (?)		? (?) ? (?)

University of Tokyo Goten-Shita Stadium

== See also ==
- 1946 Emperor's Cup
