= Mihir Bose (footballer) =

Indian footballer

Personal information
- Date of birth: 3 May 1955 (age 71)
- Place of birth: Basirhat, West Bengal, India
- Position: Forward

Senior career*
Years	Team	Apps	(Gls)
1973–74	Port Trust		
1974–77	BNR		
1977–80	East Bengal		
1980–82	Mohun Bagan		
1982–85	East Bengal		
1985–86	Mohun Bagan		
1986–89	Mohammedan Sporting		

International career
1981–1982	India	11	(1)
- * Club domestic league appearances and goals

Mihir Bose (born 3 May 1955), is a retired Indian professional footballer who played as a forward. He played for the India national team, representing the country in the 1981 Merdeka Tournament in Kuala Lumpur and the 1982 Nehru Cup in Kolkata. In a domestic career spanning twelve years between 1977 and 1989, he had represented all three of Calcutta's football clubs, East Bengal, Mohun Bagan, and Mohammedan Sporting. Bose won twenty-four trophies while representing the big three of Kolkata.

== Club career ==
Mihir Bose started his career at Port Trust in 1973, and joined Bengal Nagpur Railway in 1974 where he spent three seasons before joining East Bengal in 1977 and became a renowned name after scoring in the famous 2–0 win over Mohun Bagan in the Calcutta Football League Kolkata Derby on 7 July 1977 at the Mohun Bagan Ground. He also scored in the 1978–79 Durand Cup Final against Mohun Bagan as East Bengal won 3–0 to lift the title. In 1980, Mihir Bose joined Mohun Bagan and scored in the 1980 Indian Federation Cup Final against East Bengal which ended 1–1, and both teams were adjudged as joint champions. After spending two seasons, he returned to East Bengal and played three more seasons, captaining the side in 1983–84. He rejoined Mohun Bagan for a single season in 1985. Bose then signed for Mohammedan Sporting in 1986 where he played till 1989 before hanging up his boots.

Bose won a total of twenty-four trophies playing for the big three and scored ninety-two goals for them with sixty-four of them for East Bengal, nineteen for Mohun Bagan, and nine goals for Mohammedan Sporting. Mihir Bose was also part of the infamous match that cost the lives of sixteen football fans at the Eden Gardens on 16 August 1980, remembered as the Football Lovers' Day.

He also represented West Bengal and Railways in the Santosh Trophy.

== International career ==
Mihir Bose made his debut for the India national team in 1981 in a game against New Zealand in the 1981 Merdeka Tournament in Kuala Lumpur. He represented the country in eleven matches, including the 1981 Merdeka Tournament in Kuala Lumpur and the 1982 Nehru Cup in Kolkata and scored one goal against China on 16 February 1982 at Kolkata.

== Honours ==
East Bengal

- Calcutta Football League: 1977, 1982
- Federation Cup: 1978
- Durand Cup: 1978, 1982
- IFA Shield: 1983, 1984
- Bordoloi Trophy: 1978
- Darjeeling Gold Cup: 1982
- DCM Trophy: 1983
- Sanjay Gandhi Gold Cup: 1983

Mohun Bagan

- Federation Cup: 1980, 1981
- Durand Cup: 1980, 1985
- IFA Shield: 1981
- Rovers Cup: 1981, 1985
- Sikkim Gold Cup: 1984
- Sait Nagjee Football Tournament: 1981

Mohammedan Sporting

- Bordoloi Trophy: 1986
- All Airlines Gold Cup: 1986
- Rovers Cup: 1987
- Independence Day Cup: 1988

== See also ==
- List of East Bengal Club captains

== Bibliography ==
- Kapadia, Novy (2017). Barefoot to Boots: The Many Lives of Indian Football. Penguin Random House. ISBN 978-0-143-42641-7.
- Martinez, Dolores; Mukharji, Projit B (2009). Football: From England to the World: The Many Lives of Indian Football. Routledge. ISBN 978-1-138-88353-6. Archived from the original on 2 July 2022.
- Nath, Nirmal (2011). History of Indian Football: Upto 2009–10. Readers Service. ISBN 9788187891963. Archived from the original on 22 July 2022.
- "Triumphs and Disasters: The Story of Indian Football, 1889—2000" (PDF). Archived from the original (PDF) on 13 August 2012.
- Mukhopadhay, Subir (2018). সোনায় লেখা ইতিহাসে মোহনবাগান (transl. Mohun Bagan in the history written in gold). ISBN 978-93-850172-0-9.
- Banerjee, Argha; Basu, Rupak (2022). মোহনবাগান: সবুজ ঘাসের মেরুন গল্প (transl. Mohun Bagan: Green fields' Maroon stories). Shalidhan. ISBN 978-81-954667-0-2.
- Roy, Gautam (1 January 2021). East Bengal 100. Allsport Foundation. ISBN 978-8194763109.
- Bandyopadhyay, Santipriya (1979). Cluber Naam East Bengal (in Bengali). Kolkata: New Bengal Press.
- Chattopadhyay, Hariprasad (2017). Mohun Bagan–East Bengal (in Bengali). Kolkata: Parul Prakashan.
