= University of Tokyo Goten-Shita Stadium =

Football stadium in Tokyo, Japan

- 東京大学御殿下球場
- Interactive map of University of Tokyo Goten-Shita Stadium
- Location: Tokyo, Japan
- Coordinates: 35.71201°N 139.76344°E

University of Tokyo Goten-Shita Stadium (東京大学御殿下球場) is a football stadium in Tokyo, Japan.

It hosted the 1946 Emperor's Cup and the final game between University of Tokyo LB and Kobe University of Economics Club was played there on May 5, 1946.
