= Bandya Kakade =

Indian footballer

Personal information
- Date of birth: 1945
- Place of birth: Bombay
- Date of death: 17 October 2012 (aged 67)
- Place of death: Mumbai, India
- Position: Goalkeeper

Youth career
- 1960-61: Friends XI

Senior career*
Years	Team	Apps	(Gls)
1961-66	Central Railways		
1966-70	Mafatlal SC		
1970-89	Tata Sports Club		

International career
- India
Medal record
Men's football
Representing India
Asian Games
Bronze medal – third place	1970 Bangkok	Team
- * Club domestic league appearances and goals

Bandya Kakade (c. 1945 – 17 October 2012) was an Indian footballer who was second-choice goalkeeper in the Indian squad that won a bronze medal at the 1970 Asian Games in Bangkok. He understudied Kuppuswami Sampath in that competition and he was one of three goalkeepers who represented India in the qualifying competition for the 1972 Olympic Games.

Born in Mumbai to a family of tailors, Bandya Kakade was more interested in football and tennis than studies during his schooldays. He played for a local team, Friends XI, before progressing to the Central Railways club and then, in 1966, to Mafatlal SC. He played for the Indian junior team in 1964 and spent nearly 20 years as goalkeeper with Tata Sports Club from 1970, where he replaced S. S. Narayan. He occasionally played as a right-back and retired from the sport in 1989.

Having suffered paralysis of his right-hand side two years previously, Kakade died of a heart attack in Mumbai on 17 October 2012. He was unmarried.

== Honours ==
India

- Asian Games Bronze Medal: 1970
