= Ichiro Hosotani =

Japanese footballer

Ichiro Hosotani 細谷 一郎
Personal information
- Full name: Ichiro Hosotani
- Date of birth: January 21, 1946 (age 80)
- Place of birth: Hyogo, Japan
- Height: 1.71 m (5 ft 7 1/2 in)
- Position: Forward

Youth career
- 1962–1964: Kobe High School
- 1965–1968: Waseda University

Senior career*
| Years | Team | Apps | (Gls) |
| 1969–1978 | Mitsubishi Motors | 140 | (58) |
| Total | | 140 | (58) |

International career
| 1978 | Japan | 4 | (1) |
Medal record
Mitsubishi Motors
| Winner | Japan Soccer League | 1969 |
| Winner | Japan Soccer League | 1973 |
| Winner | Japan Soccer League | 1978 |
| Runner-up | Japan Soccer League | 1970 |
| Runner-up | Japan Soccer League | 1971 |
| Runner-up | Japan Soccer League | 1974 |
| Runner-up | Japan Soccer League | 1975 |
| Runner-up | Japan Soccer League | 1976 |
| Runner-up | Japan Soccer League | 1977 |
| Winner | JSL Cup | 1978 |
| Winner | Emperor's Cup | 1971 |
| Winner | Emperor's Cup | 1973 |
| Winner | Emperor's Cup | 1978 |
- * Club domestic league appearances and goals

Ichiro Hosotani (細谷 一郎, Hosotani Ichirō; born January 21, 1946) is a former Japanese football player who played for the Japan national football team.

== Club career ==
Hosotani was born in Hyogo Prefecture on January 21, 1946. After graduating from Waseda University, he joined Mitsubishi Motors in 1969. The club won the league champions in 1969 Japan Soccer League and 1971 Emperor's Cup. In 1973, the club won Japan Soccer League and Emperor's Cup. In 1978, the club won all three major title in Japan; Japan Soccer League, JSL Cup and Emperor's Cup. He retired in 1978. He played 140 games and scored 58 goals in the league.

== National team career ==
On July 13, 1978, when Hosotani was 32 years old, he debuted for the Japan national team against Iraq. He played four games and scored one goal for Japan that year.

== Club statistics ==
| Club performance | | | League | |
| Season | Club | League | Apps | Goals |
| Japan | | | League | |
|---|---|---|---|---|
| 1969 | Mitsubishi Motors | JSL Division 1 | 14 | 6 |
| 1970 | Mitsubishi Motors | JSL Division 1 | 12 | 6 |
| 1971 | Mitsubishi Motors | JSL Division 1 | 14 | 10 |
| 1972 | Mitsubishi Motors | JSL Division 1 | 14 | 6 |
| 1973 | Mitsubishi Motors | JSL Division 1 | 14 | 4 |
| 1974 | Mitsubishi Motors | JSL Division 1 | 15 | 5 |
| 1975 | Mitsubishi Motors | JSL Division 1 | 18 | 8 |
| 1976 | Mitsubishi Motors | JSL Division 1 | 16 | 7 |
| 1977 | Mitsubishi Motors | JSL Division 1 | 8 | 1 |
| 1978 | Mitsubishi Motors | JSL Division 1 | 15 | 5 |
| Total | | | 140 | 58 |

== National team statistics ==
Japan national team
| Year | Apps | Goals |
|---|---|---|
| 1978 | 4 | 1 |
| Total | 4 | 1 |
