= S. S. Narayan =

Indian footballer (1934–2021)

Shankar Subramaniam Narayan
Personal information
- Date of birth: 12 November 1934
- Place of birth: Ottapalam, Kerala, British Raj
- Date of death: 5 August 2021 (aged 86)
- Place of death: Thane, Maharashtra, India
- Height: 1.83 m (6 ft 0 in)
- Position: Goalkeeper

Senior career*
Years	Team	Apps	(Gls)
1950–52	Matunga Students		
1952	Indian Gymkhana F.C.		
1953–55	Matunga AC		
1955–58	Caltex Bombay		
1958–70	Tata SC		

International career
1956–1964	India	9	(0)
Medal record
Men's football
Representing India
AFC Asian Cup
Runner-up	1964 Israel	Team
- * Club domestic league appearances and goals

Shankar Subramaniam Narayan (12 November 1934 – 5 August 2021), also known as S. S. "Babu" Narayan, was a footballer who represented India as a goalkeeper at the 1956 and 1960 Olympic Games.

== Playing career ==
In club football, Narayan played for Tata SC and retired from the game in 1970, being replaced as goalkeeper at the club by Bandya Kakade. In 2013, he was felicitated by the Mumbai District Football Association for his contributions to Indian football. He was also a popular performer at the basketball court.

== Honours ==
India

- AFC Asian Cup runners-up: 1964
- Asian Quadrangular Football Tournament: 1955
- Merdeka Tournament runner-up: 1959
