= Nurul Amin (sports administrator) =

Sport administrator

- Born: 1919; Assam Province, British India
- Died: 1991 (aged 71–72)
- Occupation: Sports administrator

7th President of All India Football Federation
- In office 1975–1980
- Preceded by: Manindra Nath Dutta Ray
- Succeeded by: Khalifa Ziauddin

Nurul Amin (1919–1991) was a sports administrator. A law graduate, he was president of the All India Football Federation from 1975 to 1980. He had previously been involved with the India national football team, including as manager of their gold medal-winning team at the 1962 Asian Games, and many sports organisations in Assam, including as secretary of the Assam Cricket Association from 1948 to 1956, founding president of the Assam Olympic Association, and founding secretary of the Nagaon Sports Association. The Nurul Amin Stadium in Nagaon, Assam is named in his honour.
