= Jalpaiguri Zilla School =

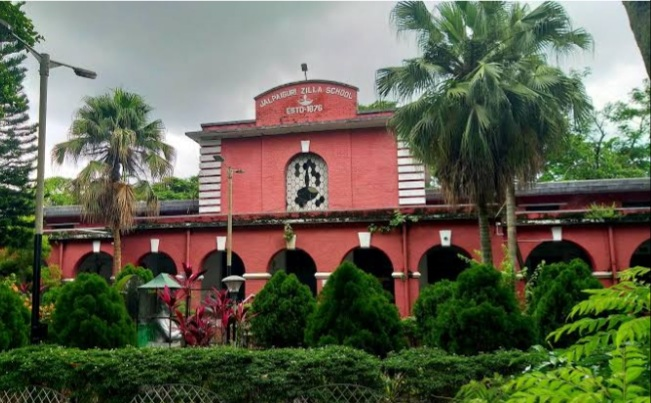

Location
- Senpara Road, Hakim Para; Jalpaiguri, West Bengal, 735101; India
- 26.5299479°N 88.7317109°E

Information
- Type: Government school
- Motto: Find a Way or Make It
- Established: 1876
- Principal: Dharma Chand Barai
- Enrollment: 1700 (approximate)
- Language: Bengali & English
- Campus: Urban
- Campus size: c. 33538 – c. m2
- Colours: White and black
- Affiliation: WBBSE and WBCHSE

Jalpaiguri Zilla School was established in 1876 and is an educational institution of Jalpaiguri district of West Bengal. The landmark red brick main building is located on the bank of River Teesta.

== Infrastructure ==
Jalpaiguri Zilla School has about 30 classrooms and six laboratories. Five of these are for physics, chemistry, biology, computer (Linux) and geography. The last is ATL Lab (Atal Bihari Vajpayee science lab). It is a sophisticated science laboratory, the first ATL lab made in Jalpaiguri district.

The school has two playgrounds. The larger is used for cricket, football, and athletics.

A mid-day meal is served to the students.

== Awards and recognition ==
- On 30 January 2019, Jalpaiguri Zilla School became the 1st runners up in the 10th All Bengal Inter Government Schools' Sports Meet, 2018–2019, in Salt Lake, Kolkata, with 4 golds, 6 silvers and 2 bronze medals.
- A student became champion in U-17 School Badminton Championships in October 2019. He took part in the national level, with becoming the leader of the West Bengal team.
- Jalpaiguri Zilla School won the state level YPC (Youth Parliament Competition) on 13 January 2020, in Kolkata.
- On 2 February 2020, Jalpaiguri Zilla School became the 1st runners up in the 11th All Bengal Inter Government Schools' Sports Meet, 2019–2020, in Murshidabad, with 4 golds, 5 silvers and 4 bronze medals.

== Notable alumni ==
- Pradip Kumar Banerjee — Indian footballer and football manager
- Sukalyan Ghosh Dastidar — Indian footballer of the 1970s
- Samaresh Majumdar — Bengali novelist
- Debesh Roy — Bengali novelist

== See also ==
- Education in India
- List of schools in India
- Education in West Bengal
