= Ronny Pasla =

Indonesian footballer (1947–2025)

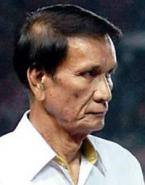
- Pasla in 2008

Personal information
- Date of birth: 15 April 1947
- Place of birth: Medan, Indonesia
- Date of death: 24 November 2025 (aged 78)
- Place of death: Jakarta, Indonesia
- Height: 1.83 m (6 ft 0 in)
- Position: Goalkeeper

Youth career
- –1967: PSMS Medan

Senior career*
Years	Team	Apps	(Gls)
1967–1973	PSMS Medan	44	(0)
1967–1969	→ Dinamo Medan (loan)		
1969–1973	→ Bintang Utara (loan)		
1973–1978	Persija Jakarta	34	(0)
1979–1985	Indonesia Moeda	59	(0)

International career
1967–1979	Indonesia	31	(0)
- * Club domestic league appearances and goals

Ronny Pasla (15 April 1947 – 24 November 2025) was an Indonesian footballer who played as a goalkeeper. He represented the Indonesia national team from 1967 to 1979.

Pasla is regarded as one of the finest goalkeepers in Indonesia's history. He served as the primary goalkeeper for the national team during the 1970s, succeeding his predecessor, Judo Hadianto. Throughout his tenure with the national team, he contributed to Indonesia's victories in the 1968 King's Cup, 1969 Merdeka Tournament, 1972 Jakarta Anniversary Tournament, and 1972 Pesta Sukan Cup.

Before moving to Persija Jakarta in the latter part of his career, Pasla played for PSMS Medan and helped the team to win the Aga Khan Gold Cup in 1967.

== Early life ==
Ronny Pasla was born on 15 April 1947 in Medan, North Sumatra, to parents Frans Felix Pasla and Magdalena Sorongan. Both of his parents were Minahasan people hailing from Manado, North Sulawesi.

Pasla was initially a talented tennis player. He was even registered as an athlete to represent North Sumatra in the 6th National Sports Week (PON) held in Jakarta in 1965. However, this event was ultimately canceled following the outbreak of the 30 September Movement. Subsequently, Pasla achieved victory in the 1967 National Junior Tennis Championship in Malang, East Java.

== Personal life and death ==
Pasla was married to Enny K. Pasla, and together they had six children; Fransiska, Fransisce, Renaldo, Jonny Raymond, Diaz and Sisvanni Natalia Theresia.

Pasla died in Jakarta on 24 November 2025, at the age of 78.

== Honours ==
PSMS Youth

- Soeratin Cup: 1967

PSMS Medan

- Perserikatan: 1967, 1971
- Aga Khan Gold Cup: 1967
- Soeharto Cup: 1972
- Marah Halim Cup: 1972, 1973

Persija Jakarta

- Perserikatan: 1975

Indonesia

- King's Cup: 1968; runner-up: 1969
- Merdeka Tournament: 1969
- Pesta Sukan Cup: 1972
- Jakarta Anniversary Tournament: 1972; runner-up: 1971, 1973, 1974, 1975, 1978

Individual

- Main Citizens of Medan: 1967
- National Best Athlete: 1972
- National Best Goalkeeper: 1974
