= Sukalyan Ghosh Dastidar =

Indian footballer (1947–2018)

Sukalyan Ghosh Dastidar সুকল্যাণ ঘোষ দস্তিদার
Personal information
- Date of birth: 1947
- Place of birth: Babupara, Jalpaiguri, Bengal Presidency, British India
- Date of death: 9 September 2018 (aged 71)
- Place of death: Kalighat, Kolkata, West Bengal, India
- Positions: Forward; attacking midfielder

Youth career
- 1960–1968: Jalpaiguri Young Men's Association

Senior career*
Years	Team	Apps	(Gls)
1968–1969	Rajasthan	(-)	(-)
1969–1975	Mohun Bagan	(-)	(71)
1975–1979	East Bengal	(-)	(-)
Total		-	(-)

International career
(-)	India	5	(2)
Medal record
Men's Football
Representing India
Asian Games
Bronze medal – third place	1970 Bangkok	Team
- * Club domestic league appearances and goals

Sukalyan Ghosh Dastidar (born 1947 - died 9 September 2018) was an Indian professional footballer from Jalpaiguri, who played as a striker for the India national football team, alongside Mohun Bagan and East Bengal. He also represented Bengal in Santosh Trophy.

He represented the bronze-medal winning India national football team at the 1970 Asian Games held in Bangkok, Thailand. He was the star striker of Mohun Bagan and won numerous accolades during his career. He was captain of Mohun Bagan in 1973. In 1975, he left Mohun Bagan to join rival East Bengal FC. He won numerous trophies as part of the India national football team and Mohun Bagan and East Bengal, including the 1970 Asian Games Bronze, the IFA Shield, the Santosh Trophy, the Calcutta Football League and the Rovers Cup.

== Early life ==
He was born in Jalpaiguri District, Bengal Presidency, British India in an affluential family to parents who migrated to the northern district of Jalpaiguri from Barisal, Bengal Presidency before the Partition of 1947. In this quaint town, which has a history of nurturing great football talents like Pradip Kumar Banerjee, he started his training at the Jalpaiguri Young Men's Association (JYMA), where he was mentored by Rabi Gathu (রবি গাঠু স্যার), the well-known football coach at JYMA. In his early days, he was a leading player in the inter-school football tournaments and the Jalpaiguri Amateur Football League. During these tournaments, Dastidar's footballing antics used to draw huge crowds notably at the Friends Union Club grounds, the JYMA and the Jalpaiguri Town Club. He was a student of Jalpaiguri Zilla School. He played for the Rajasthan football team in the Santosh Trophy for a short while after moving from Jalpaiguri. He was recruited by Mohun Bagan soon after.

== Career ==
He was part of the Bronze winning Indian football team at the 1970 Asian Games led by Syed Nayeemuddin, in Bangkok, Thailand. After his first stint, he went on to play for the country five times.

Ghosh Dastidar joined Mohun Bagan in 1970. He was part of the club's Bangladesh tour of May 1972, where they defeated Dhaka Mohammedan, but lost to Shadhin Bangla football team. He won a double crown (Calcutta Football League and IFA Shield) in his maiden season with Mohun Bagan and went on to play for the club until 1974. He scored a total of 71 goals for Mohun Bagan in all competitions and was its captain in 1973.

He represented Bengal in the Santosh Trophy. With Bengal in 1969, the team led by Santo Mitra, Ghosh Dastidar won title. He won Santosh Trophy again in 1971–72 and 1972–73. He switched allegiance to East Bengal Club in 1975.

He was famous for his precision long-distance shots ranging from 35 to 40 yards and he stormed the 1970s Calcutta football scene during his heyday as a striker.

== Controversies ==
In 1973, when Mohun Bagan took the lead for the first time in a game in four years (Mohun Bagan had a dry spell through 1970 to 1975), through a superb shot from 35 yards by Sukalyan Ghosh Dastidar, it just started raining cats and dogs, and the match was abandoned. The same year, East Bengal centre-forward Subhash Bhowmick accidentally fell on Mohun Bagan captain Shankar Banerjee. Fights broke out in the stadium as the poorly refereed game went on. At the end of the match as Mohun Bagan embraced another heartbreaking and unfortunate defeat, Ghosh Dastidar walked up to the referee Bishwanath Dutta, and struck him a mighty blow on his nose. Ghosh Dastidar was arrested; But he had also ended Dutta's refereeing career. He had crushed Dutta's nose, and bone fragments had got into his eyes, affecting his vision irreparably. He has publicly apologised and repented for this mishap throughout his later life.

In 1975, he left Mohun Bagan to join arch-rival East Bengal FC.

== Later life ==
He settled in Kolkata after retiring from professional association football in 1979. He also served as an employee of the Central Bank of India. He continued to actively mentor aspiring footballers in spite of dissonances with Mohun Bagan later on. In his public talks, he stressed the need for transformation of the overall environment and sporting culture of the football scene in Calcutta and India, stressing how it was distinctly different and more constructive in the 1970s which enabled the football clubs then to successfully sustain and nurture new talents. In his later life, he was consistently critical of the present situation of football clubs in India and South Asia.

He used to visit his hometown Jalpaiguri often.

== Personal life ==
He has two daughters and two grandchildren. He was a pet lover.

== Death ==
He died from cardiac arrest at the age of 71, on 9 September 2018 in a private hospital in South Kolkata.

== Legacy ==
His performances and midfield actions inspired footballers and youngsters in Jalpaiguri, as well as in the Calcutta Maidan scene and nationwide. He was part of the golden generation of Indian football.

== Honours ==
Mohun Bagan

- Durand Cup: 1974
- IFA Shield: 1969
- Indian Super Cup: 1970, 1971, 1972
- Calcutta Football League: 1969

East Bengal

- Federation Cup: 1978
- IFA Shield: 1975, 1976
- Durand Cup: 1978
- Calcutta Football League: 1975, 1977
- Rovers Cup: 1975

India

- Asian Games Bronze Medal: 1970

Bengal

- Santosh Trophy: 1969–70, 1971–72, 1972–73

== See also ==
- History of Indian football
- History of the India national football team

== Bibliography ==
- Kapadia, Novy (2017). Barefoot to Boots: The Many Lives of Indian Football. Penguin Random House. ISBN 978-0-143-42641-7.
- Martinez, Dolores; Mukharji, Projit B (2009). Football: From England to the World: The Many Lives of Indian Football. Routledge. ISBN 978-1-138-88353-6. Archived from the original on 2 July 2022.
- Nath, Nirmal (2011). History of Indian Football: Upto 2009–10. Readers Service. ISBN 9788187891963. Archived from the original on 22 July 2022.
- "Triumphs and Disasters: The Story of Indian Football, 1889—2000" (PDF). Archived from the original (PDF) on 13 August 2012.
- Mukhopadhay, Subir (2018). সোনায় লেখা ইতিহাসে মোহনবাগান (transl. Mohun Bagan in the history written in gold). ISBN 978-93-850172-0-9.
- Banerjee, Argha; Basu, Rupak (2022). মোহনবাগান: সবুজ ঘাসের মেরুন গল্প (transl. Mohun Bagan: Green fields' Maroon stories). Shalidhan. ISBN 978-81-954667-0-2.
