= Amar Bahadur Gurung =

Indian athlete

Personal information
- Date of birth: 18 April 1942
- Place of birth: Dehra Dun, British India
- Date of death: 10 March 2016 (aged 73)
- Place of death: Gurgaon, India
- Position: Forward

Senior career*
Years	Team	Apps	(Gls)
1960–1967	Gorkha Brigade		
1967–1980	Mafatlal SC		

International career
	India	22	(2)
Medal record
Men's football
Representing India
Asian Games
Bronze medal – third place	1970 Bangkok	Team
- * Club domestic league appearances and goals

Amar Bahadur Gurung was a former Indian association football player who was part of the squad that secured the bronze medal at the 1970 Asian Games hosted at Bangkok. He scored the winning goal against Japan which secured the medal.

== Honours ==
India

- Asian Games Bronze Medal: 1970
- Merdeka Tournament third place: 1970
- Pesta Sukan Cup: 1971

Gorkha Brigade

- Durand Cup: 1966, 1969
