= Yoshio Kikugawa =

Japanese footballer and manager (1944–2022)

Yoshio Kikugawa 菊川 凱夫
- Kikugawa in 1971

Personal information
- Date of birth: September 12, 1944
- Place of birth: Fujieda, Shizuoka, Empire of Japan
- Date of death: December 2, 2022 (aged 78)
- Position: Defender

Youth career
- Fujieda Higashi High School
- 1964–1967: Meiji University

Senior career*
Years	Team	Apps	(Gls)
1968–1974	Mitsubishi Motors	94	(2)
Total		94	(2)

International career
1969–1971	Japan	16	(0)

Managerial career
- 1982–1994: Chuo Bohan
- 1999: Avispa Fukuoka
Medal record
Mitsubishi Motors
Winner	Japan Soccer League	1969
Winner	Japan Soccer League	1973
Runner-up	Japan Soccer League	1970
Runner-up	Japan Soccer League	1971
Runner-up	Japan Soccer League	1974
Winner	Emperor's Cup	1971
Winner	Emperor's Cup	1973
Runner-up	Emperor's Cup	1968
- * Club domestic league appearances and goals

Yoshio Kikugawa (菊川 凱夫, Kikugawa Yoshio; September 12, 1944 – December 2, 2022) was a Japanese football player and manager. He played for the Japan national team.

== Club career ==
Kikugawa was born in Fujieda on September 12, 1944. After graduating from Meiji University, he joined the Mitsubishi Motors in 1968. The club won the league championships in 1969 and 1973. The club won the 1971 and 1973 Emperor's Cups. He retired in 1974. He played 94 games and scored 2 goals in the league. He was selected as one of the Best Eleven in 1969.

== International career ==
In October 1969, he was selected for the Japan national team for the 1970 World Cup qualification. At the qualification on October 12, he debuted against South Korea. He also played at the 1970 Asian Games. He played 16 games for Japan until 1971.

== Coaching career ==
After retirement in 1982, Kikugawa signed with a new club, the Chuo Bohan (later Avispa Fukuoka), based in his local league in Fujieda and became a manager. In 1991, he got the club promoted to the Japan Soccer League Division 2. He resigned in 1994. In 1999, he succeeded Takaji Mori as manager for one season.

== Personal life and death ==
Kikugawa died from pneumonia on December 2, 2022, at the age of 78.

== Career statistics ==
=== Club ===
Appearances and goals by club, season and competition
Club	Season	League		
Club	Season	Division	Apps	Goals
Mitsubishi Motors	1968	JSL Division 1	12	2
Mitsubishi Motors	1969	JSL Division 1	14	0
Mitsubishi Motors	1970	JSL Division 1	13	0
Mitsubishi Motors	1971	JSL Division 1	13	0
Mitsubishi Motors	1972	JSL Division 1	14	0
Mitsubishi Motors	1973	JSL Division 1	18	0
Mitsubishi Motors	1974	JSL Division 1	10	0
Total			94	2

=== International ===
Appearances and goals by national team and year
National team	Year	Apps	Goals
Japan	1969	2	0
Japan	1970	12	0
Japan	1971	2	0
Total		16	0

== Managerial statistics ==
Team	From	To	Record				
Team	From	To	G	W	D	L	Win %
Avispa Fukuoka	1999	1999	30	10	1	19	33.33
Total			30	10	1	19	33.33

== Honours ==
- Japan Soccer League Best Eleven: 1969
