= Suttha Sudsa-ard =

Thai former footballer (1946–2018)

Personal information
- Full name: Suttha Sudsa-ard
- Date of birth: 30 September 1946
- Place of birth: Bangkok, Thailand
- Date of death: 14 August 2018 (aged 71)
- Position: Forward

Senior career*
Years	Team	Apps	(Gls)
- PAT

International career
1978–1988	Thailand	51	(25)
- * Club domestic league appearances and goals

Suttha Sudsa-ard (Note: Also written as Sutta Sudsaard), (Thai: สุทธา สุดสะอาด; 30 September 1946 – 14 August 2018) known by footballing nickname as Jom Mong Pasutha (Thai: จอมโหม่งพสุธา) or The Landed Header, was a Thai former footballer who played as forward for Port Authority of Thailand and the Thailand national football team.

== Death ==
On 14 August 2018, Sudsa-ard died of Pulmonary Edema at aged 71.
