= Malay Kumar Lahiri =

Indian footballer and army officer (1934–1996)

Lieutenant General Malay Kumar Lahiri PVSM
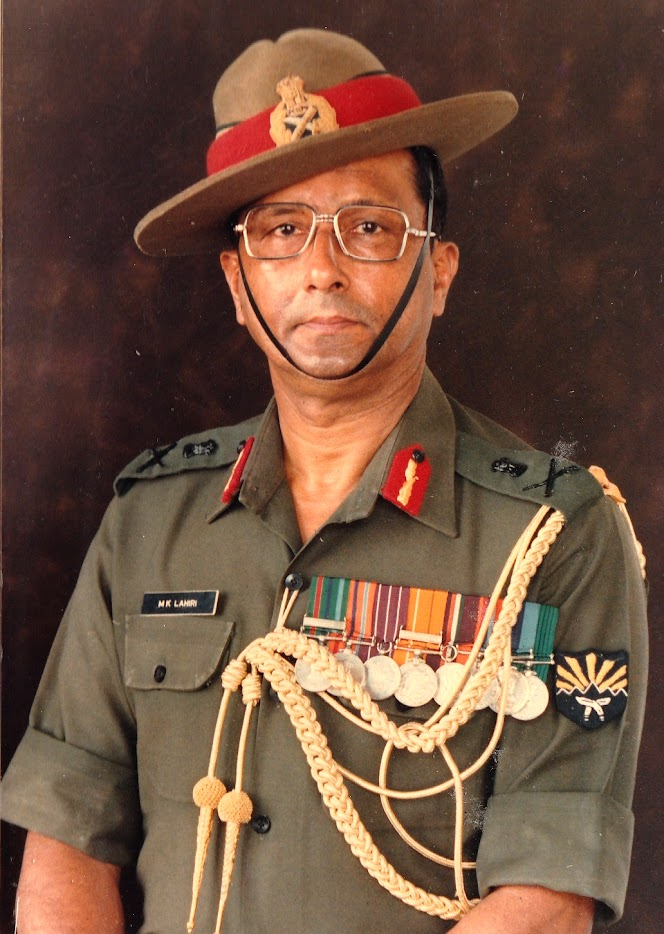
- Born: 20 September 1934; Gaffargaon, Mymensingh, Bengal Province, British India (now in Bangladesh)
- Died: 16 February 1996 (aged 61); New Delhi, India
- Other name: Mike Lahiri
- Citizenship: Indian
- Education: National Defence Academy
- Occupations: Sportsman and Army Officer
- Years active: 1954-1992
- Employer: Government of India
- Organization: Indian Army
- Known for: A footballer who played for India between 1954 and 1961. Post retirement from sports, he excelled in the Indian Army and retired as a Lieutenant General after 38 years of service.
- Spouse: Krishna Lahiri (1961)
- Children: 2
- Awards: Param Vishisht Seva Medal

Lieutenant General Malay Kumar Lahiri, PVSM (also Moloy Lahiri and fondly called Mike Lahiri in Army circles; (20 September 1934 – 16 February 1996) was an Indian Army General Officer and former Indian association football player. He was part of the Indian teams that competed in the Asia Cup, 1959 Merdeka Tournament in Kuala Lumpur, 1959 pre Olympic tournament in Kabul, and was the first reserve for the 1960 Summer Olympics in Rome.

== Childhood and early life ==
Malay Lahiri was born in Usthi village, Mymensingh district (now in Bangladesh), the fourth child of Ashwini Kumar Lahiri and Narmada Lahiri. Ashwini Lahiri was the Principal of Ananda Mohan College, Mymensingh and stayed on after partition before moving to Calcutta, West Bengal after his children had already moved. Malay Lahiri's early schooling was in Mymensingh after which he followed his elder brother to Calcutta. His immediate elder sibling was in the NDA and Malay followed him there and became a Gentleman Cadet in what was then called the Joint Services Wing. Incidentally, his youngest brother became a doctor and joined the Army Medical Corps (AMC) and retired as a Lieutenant General also, as Director General Medical Services, with both brothers serving as Lieutenant Generals at the same time.

== Army career ==
Lahiri was an officer in the Indian Army and played for Gorkha Brigade and Services in the Durand Tournament and Santosh Trophy.

He was commissioned to the Third Battalion of the 3 Gorkha Rifles on 4 December 1954 and was awarded the silver medal. The Gold Medal in his Course was awarded to GC Bipin Chandra Joshi, later Chief of Army Staff. This 14th Course was a distinguished one with quite a few officers going on to the rank of Lieutenant General.

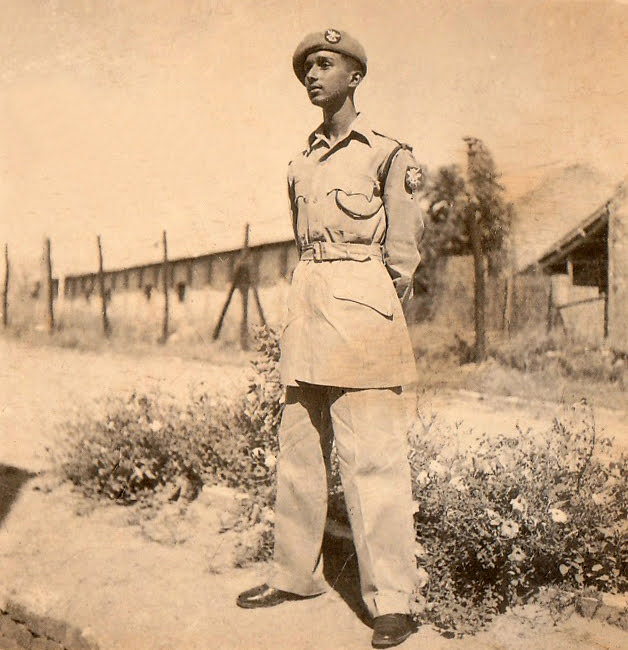
Gentleman Cadet Malay Kumar Lahiri at NDA

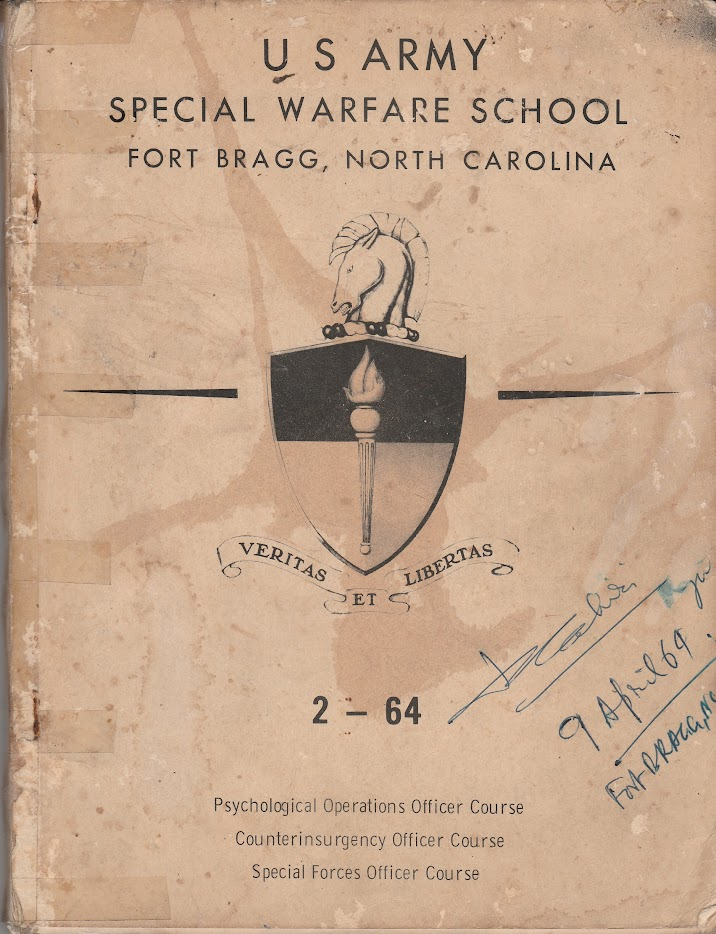

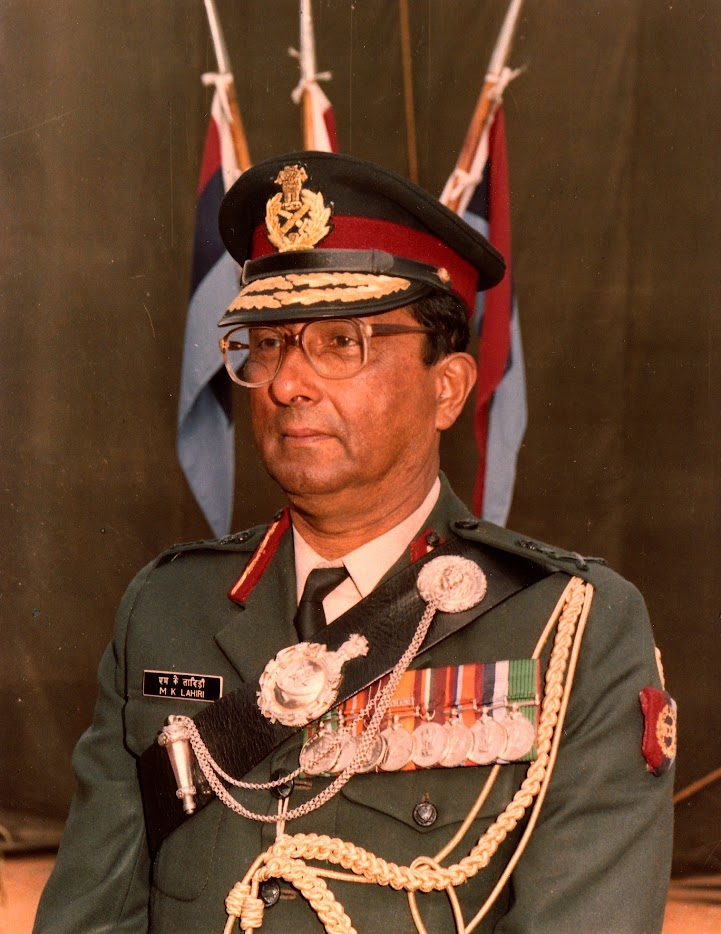
Lt Gen MK Lahiri, DG NCC

After the Sino-Indian War of 1962, he was selected to go to Fort Bragg, North Carolina to undergo training and then graduated from the US Army Special Warfare School. After successfully completing the Course in Psychological Operations, Counter Insurgency and Special Forces Operations, he came back to India to design and set-up the Commando Wing for the Indian Army at Infantry School, Mhow which was then relocated to Belgaum.

His major assignments in his 38-year career in the Indian Army were:

- Commissioned into 3/3 Gorkha Rifles
- Underwent training at Fort Bragg, North Carolina
- Commanding Officer of 4/3 Gorkha Rifles
- Commander, 25 Infantry Brigade
- National Defence College
- Defence Advisor, High Commission of India, Bangladesh
- General Officer Commanding (GOC) 8 Mountain Division
- Commandant Counter-Insurgency and Jungle Warfare School
- Director General Assam Rifles
- General Officer Commanding (GOC) IV Corps
- Director General National Cadet Corps

He was also the President, Gorkha Brigade of the Indian Army and Colonel of the Regiment of 3rd Gorkha Rifles. He was awarded the highest peacetime military award the Param Vishisht Seva Medal (PVSM) by the President of India in the Republic Day honours of 1992. He retired from Service on 30 September 1992, and died from cancer in New Delhi, on 16 February 1996, at the age of 62.

== Notable achievements and awards ==
Silver Medal of the XIVth Course Indian Military Academy	
Durand Cup runner-up: 1953 representing NDA	
Durand Cup runner-up: 1958 representing Gorkha Brigade	Durand Cup trophy 1958
Asia Cup in Ernakulum representing India	
Merdeka Tournament runner-up: 1959	Merdeka Trophy 1959
Pre-Olympic tournament in Kabul, Afghanistan in 1959 representing India	
Param Vishisht Seva Medal (PVSM) in 1992 for distinguished service in the Indian Army	Param Vishisht Seva Medal (PVSM)

== Dates of rank ==
Insignia	Rank	Date of Rank
	2nd Lieutenant	December 4, 1954
	Lieutenant	
	Captain	
	Major	1963
	Lieutenant Colonel	
	Brigadier	1978
	Major General	1984
	Lieutenant General	

== Medals ==
Lt Ge MK Lahiri medals
Param Vishisht Seva Medal	Samanya Seva Medal 1965	Raksha Medal 1965	Sangram Medal	Sanya Seva Medal	25th Independence Anniversary Medal	30 Years Long Service Medal	20 Years Long Service Medal	9 Years Long Service Medal

== Post-retirement ==
Post his retirement, Mike Lahiri did not wish to take up any assignment. However, he accepted the offer of becoming a member of the monitoring committee overseeing preparations for the 1994 Hiroshima Asian Games and the 1996 Atlanta Olympics, in addition to other international games till the Atlanta Olympics. During this assignment he was diagnosed with cancer and died a short while later on February 16, 1996.
