= Sudhir Karmakar =

Indian footballer

Personal information
- Date of birth: 1948 (age 77–78)
- Place of birth: Rishra, West Bengal, India
- Position: Defender

Senior career*
Years	Team	Apps	(Gls)
1970–76	East Bengal		
1976–80	Mohun Bagan		
1980–83	East Bengal		

International career
1970–1973	India		
Medal record
Men's football
Representing India
Asian Games
Bronze medal – third place	1970 Bangkok	Team
- * Club domestic league appearances and goals

Sudhir Karmakar (born 1948), is a retired Indian professional footballer who played as a defender. He played for the India national team, representing the country in the 1970 Asian Games where India finished third and won Bronze. In a domestic career spanning thirteen years between 1970 and 1983, he represented the two Calcutta's football giants, East Bengal and Mohun Bagan, having a unique distinction of winning the coveted treble - IFA Shield, Durand Cup and Rovers Cup with both the teams.

== Club career ==
Sudhir Karmakar was part of the famous 1970s East Bengal side that won the Calcutta Football League consecutively for six times from 1970 to 1975. He joined East Bengal in 1970, and in the first season, he was pivotal in the club winning the League and the IFA Shield, with a memorable performance in the final against PAS Tehran where he was adjudged as the man of the match, having kept the Iranian national team striker Asghar Sharafi nullified throughout the match. He also captained East Bengal in the 1972–73 season, where East Bengal won all five tournaments they participated in, including the coveted triple crown of Indian football: IFA Shield, Durand Cup and Rovers Cup, remaining undefeated throughout the season in all competitions and conceded just three goals. Sudhir Karmakar won a total of 26 major trophies at East Bengal.

Sudhir Karmakar joined Mohun Bagan in 1976 and played 4 seasons. The most memorable season came in the 1977–78 season, where he helped Bagan win their first triple crown and hence having a unique distinction of winning the triple crown with two different clubs.

He left Bagan and rejoined East Bengal in 1980, and helped the club win the 1980 Federation Cup and the Rovers Cup once again. He remained with the club till 1982–83 season, until finally retiring from football.

He also represented West Bengal in the Santosh Trophy.

== International career ==
Sudhir Karmakar was part of the Indian national football team in the 1970 Asian Games where India finished third and won Bronze. He was adjudged as the best defender of the tournament.

== Honours ==
East Bengal

- Calcutta Football League (7): 1970, 1971, 1972, 1973, 1974, 1975, 1982
- Federation Cup (1): 1980
- Durand Cup (3): 1970, 1972, 1982
- IFA Shield (5): 1970, 1972, 1973, 1974, 1975
- Rovers Cup (4): 1972, 1973, 1975, 1980
- Bordoloi Trophy (2): 1972, 1973
- DCM Trophy (2): 1973, 1974
- Stafford Challenge Cup (1): 1981
- Darjeeling Gold Cup (1): 1982

Mohun Bagan

- Calcutta Football League (3): 1976, 1978, 1979
- Federation Cup (1): 1978
- Durand Cup (2): 1977, 1979
- IFA Shield (4): 1976, 1977, 1978, 1979
- Rovers Cup (2): 1976, 1977
- Darjeeling Gold Cup (2): 1976, 1977

Bengal

- Santosh Trophy: 1969–70

== See also ==
- List of East Bengal Club captains
