= Norio Yoshimizu =

Japanese footballer

Norio Yoshimizu 吉水 法生
Personal information
- Full name: Norio Yoshimizu
- Date of birth: August 21, 1946 (age 80)
- Place of birth: Empire of Japan
- Position: Midfielder

Youth career
- 1962–1964: Kamakura Gakuen High School
- 1965–1968: Keio University

Senior career*
Years	Team	Apps	(Gls)
1969–1972	Furukawa Electric	53	(6)
Total		53	(6)

International career
1970	Japan	4	(1)
- * Club domestic league appearances and goals

Norio Yoshimizu (吉水 法生, Yoshimizu Norio; born August 21, 1946) is a former Japanese football player. He played for Japan national team.

== Club career ==
Yoshimizu was born on August 21, 1946. After graduating from Keio University, he joined Furukawa Electric in 1969. He retired in 1972. He played 53 games and scored 6 goals in the league.

== National team career ==
On July 31, 1970, Yoshimizu debuted for Japan national team against Hong Kong. He played 4 games and scored 1 goal for Japan in 1970.

== National team statistics ==
Japan national team
Year	Apps	Goals
1970	4	3
Total	4	3
