= Shibaji Banerjee =

Indian footballer

Personal information
- Date of death: 19 February 2017
- Place of death: Kolkata, West Bengal, India
- Position: Goalkeeper

Senior career*
Years	Team	Apps	(Gls)
- Mohun Bagan

International career
- India
- * Club domestic league appearances and goals

Shibaji Banerjee (died 19 February 2017) was an Indian footballer who played as a goalkeeper for Mohun Bagan and the India national team.

== Playing career ==
He was mainly known as the goalkeeper for Mohun Bagan when the club took on the New York Cosmos in a friendly match in 1977. The Cosmos at the time had former Brazilian international Pelé on their side. Banerjee managed to stop a free-kick from the Brazilian during the match as it ended 2–2.

After retiring from playing, Banerjee remained on the technical committee for Mohun Bagan. On 18 February 2017, the day before his death, Banerjee was in attendance as Mohun Bagan defeated DSK Shivajians in an I-League match 3–1. The next day, Banerjee died of a heart attack.

== Honours ==
Mohun Bagan

- Federation Cup: 1978–79

Individual

- Mohun Bagan Ratna: 2021
