= Judo Hadianto =

Indonesian footballer (born 1941)

Personal information
- Date of birth: 19 September 1941 (age 85)
- Place of birth: Soerakarta, Dutch East Indies
- Height: 1.70 m (5 ft 7 in)
- Position: Goalkeeper

Senior career*
Years	Team	Apps	(Gls)
1958–1959	Persis Solo		
1959–1960	→ UMS (loan)		
1960–1968	Persija Jakarta	28	(0)
1960–1962	→ UMS (loan)		
1968–1970	PSMS Medan	10	(0)
1968–1969	→ Mahesa (loan)		
1969–1970	→ Pardedetex Medan (loan)		
1970–1973	Persija Jakarta	20	(0)
1972–1973	→ Indonesia Moeda (loan)		
1980–1982	Indonesia Moeda		

International career
1960–1961	Indonesia U19	6	(0)
1962–1972	Indonesia	53	(0)
- * Club domestic league appearances and goals

Judo Hadianto (born 19 September 1941) is an Indonesian former professional football player who played as a goalkeeper. He was one of Indonesia's legendary football players in the 1960s and 1970s. At that time he was recognized as the best goalkeeper in Asia.

== Career ==
Judo has achieved various achievements at both the club and international levels. In the domestic competition, he won Perserikatan twice with Persija Jakarta in 1964 and 1973; and at the international level, he contributed to the Indonesian national team to win several invitational tournaments such as Merdeka Tournament, King's Cup, Jakarta Anniversary Tournament, and Pesta Sukan Cup. He also brought the under-19 national team to win the U-20 Asian Cup in 1961.

== Personal life ==
Judo studied at the Faculty of Economics, University of Indonesia from 1960 to 1963 but did not finish.

== Honours ==
PSMS Medan

- Perserikatan: 1969

Persija Jakarta

- Perserikatan (2): 1964, 1973

Indonesia U19

- AFC Youth Championship (1): 1961

Indonesia

- Aga Khan Gold Cup (1): 1966
- Merdeka Tournament (2): 1962, 1969; runner-up: 1971
- King's Cup (1): 1968; runner-up: 1969
- Pesta Sukan Cup (1): 1972
- Jakarta Anniversary Tournament (1): 1972; runner-up: 1971, 1973
