= Nurul Amin Stadium =

Multi-purpose stadium in Nagaon, India

- Full name: Nurul Amin Stadium
- Former names: Nowgong Sports Club Ground; Jubilee Field
- Location: Nagaon, Assam
- Owner: Nagaon Municipality Board
- Operator: Nagaon Municipality Board
- Capacity: 5,000
- Surface: Grass
- Scoreboard: Yes

Construction
- Groundbreaking: 1958
- Opened: 1958

Website
- ESPNcricinfo

Nowgong Sports Club Ground (known as Nurul Amin Stadium; Assamese: নুৰুল আমিন ক্ৰীড়াক্ষেত্ৰ) is a multi-purpose stadium in Nagaon, Assam. The ground is mainly used for football and cricket matches. It hosts the Independence Day Cup annually.

The stadium has hosted eight Ranji Trophy matches from 1964 when Assam cricket team played against Bihar cricket team until 1989 but since then the stadium has hosted non-first-class matches. The stadium is named after Nurul Amin, who was a renowned sports administrator in Assam.
