= Kuppuswami Sampath =

Indian footballer (died 2023)

Personal information
- Date of birth: 15 September 1947
- Place of birth: Bangalore, Mysore State, India
- Date of death: 6 March 2023 (aged 75)
- Place of death: Bangaluru, Karnataka, India
- Height: 1.88 m (6 ft 2 in)
- Position: Goalkeeper

Senior career*
Years	Team	Apps	(Gls)
- Madras Engineering Group
1973–1978	Dempo SC		

International career
- India
Medal record
Men's football
Representing India
Asian Games
Bronze medal – third place	1970 Bangkok	Team
- * Club domestic league appearances and goals

Kuppuswami Sampath (15 September 1947 – 6 March 2023) was an Indian footballer who played as a goalkeeper. He played for the India national team squad that won a bronze medal at the 1970 Asian Games in Bangkok. He played for the MEG club in Bangalore.

He became manager and trained Dempo from 1985 to 1999.

== Honours ==
India

- Asian Games Bronze Medal: 1970
- Merdeka Tournament third place: 1970
- Pesta Sukan Cup (Singapore): 1971

Dempo SC

- Rovers Cup: 1975
