= 1946 Emperor's Cup =

1946 statistics of Emperor's cup

Tournament details
- Country: Japan

Final positions
- Champions: University of Tokyo LB
- Runners-up: Kobe University of Economics Club
- Semifinalists: All Waseda University; Kobe University of Economics Club

Statistics of Emperor's Cup in the 1946 season.

== Overview ==
It was contested by 12 teams, and University of Tokyo LB won the championship.

== Results ==
=== 1st Round ===
- University of Tokyo LB 6–1 Mazda
- All Keio University 4–1 Urawa Club
- Tokyo Shukyu-dan w/o Tochigi-shi
- All Waseda University 2–1 Shonan Club

=== Quarterfinals ===
- University of Tokyo LB 3–2 All Keio University
- Tokyo Shukyu-dan 1–6 All Waseda University
- Kobe University of Economics Club 4–1 Yuasa Power Storage
- Gakushi Club 2–0 Kwansei Gakuin University

=== Semifinals ===
- University of Tokyo LB 2–0 All Waseda University
- Kobe University of Economics Club 1–2 Gakushi Club

Gakushi Club retired after Semifinals

=== Final ===
- University of Tokyo LB 6–2 Kobe University of Economics Club

University of Tokyo LB won the championship.
