= Yusuke Omi =

Japanese footballer

Yusuke Omi 近江 友介
Personal information
- Full name: Yusuke Omi
- Date of birth: December 26, 1946 (age 79)
- Place of birth: Tokyo, Empire of Japan
- Height: 1.68 m (5 ft 6 in)
- Position: Forward

Youth career
- Saitama Urawa High School
- 1966–1969: Hosei University

Senior career*
Years	Team	Apps	(Gls)
1970–1974	Hitachi	49	(8)
Total		49	(8)

International career
1970	Japan	5	(1)
Medal record
Hitachi
Winner	Japan Soccer League	1972
Runner-up	Japan Soccer League	1973
Winner	Emperor's Cup	1972
Runner-up	Emperor's Cup	1973
- * Club domestic league appearances and goals

Yusuke Omi (近江 友介, Omi Yusuke; born December 26, 1946) is a former Japanese football player. He played for Japan national team.

== Club career ==
Omi was born in Tokyo on December 26, 1946. After graduating from Hosei University, he joined Hitachi in 1970. In 1972, the club won Japan Soccer League and Emperor's Cup. In 1973, the club won the 2nd place at Japan Soccer League and Emperor's Cup. He retired in 1974. He played 49 games and scored 8 goals in the league.

== National team career ==
On August 4, 1970, Omi debuted for Japan national team against Thailand. He also played at 1970 Asian Games. He played 5 games and scored 1 goal for Japan in 1970.

== Club statistics ==
Club performance			League	
Season	Club	League	Apps	Goals
Japan			League	
1970	Hitachi	JSL Division 1	14	3
1971	Hitachi	JSL Division 1	11	3
1972	Hitachi	JSL Division 1	5	0
1973	Hitachi	JSL Division 1	8	0
1974	Hitachi	JSL Division 1	11	2
Total			49	8

== National team statistics ==
Japan national team
Year	Apps	Goals
1970	5	1
Total	5	1
