= Eizo Yuguchi =

Japanese footballer

Eizo Yuguchi 湯口 栄蔵
- Yuguchi in 1971

Personal information
- Full name: Eizo Yuguchi
- Date of birth: July 4, 1945
- Place of birth: Osaka, Osaka, Empire of Japan
- Date of death: February 2, 2003 (aged 57)
- Place of death: Nara, Nara, Japan
- Height: 1.74 m (5 ft 8 1/2 in)
- Position: Midfielder

Youth career
- 1961–1963: Meisei High School
- 1964–1967: Kansai University

Senior career*
Years	Team	Apps	(Gls)
1968–1972	Yanmar Diesel	66	(3)
Total		66	(3)

International career
1969–1970	Japan	5	(1)
Medal record
Yanmar Diesel
Winner	Japan Soccer League	1971
Runner-up	Japan Soccer League	1968
Runner-up	Japan Soccer League	1972
Winner	Emperor's Cup	1968
Winner	Emperor's Cup	1970
Runner-up	Emperor's Cup	1971
Runner-up	Emperor's Cup	1972
Representing Japan
Olympic Games
Bronze medal – third place	1968 Mexico City	Team
- * Club domestic league appearances and goals

Eizo Yuguchi (湯口 栄蔵, Yuguchi Eizō; July 4, 1945 – February 2, 2003) was a former Japanese football player. He played for Japan national team.

== Club career ==
Yuguchi was born in Osaka on July 4, 1945. After graduating from Kansai University, he joined his local club Yanmar Diesel in 1968. The club won the league champions in 1971. The club also won 1968 and 1970 Emperor's Cup. He retired in 1972. He played 66 games and scored 3 goals in the league.

== National team career ==
In October 1968, Yuguchi was selected Japan national team for 1968 Summer Olympics in Mexico City. At this competition, on October 18, he played against Spain and Japan won Bronze Medal. In 2018, this team was selected Japan Football Hall of Fame. He also played at 1970 World Cup qualification and 1970 Asian Games. He played 5 games and scored 1 goal for Japan until 1970.

On February 2, 2003, Yuguchi died of stomach cancer in Nara at the age of 57.

== National team statistics ==
Japan national team
Year	Apps	Goals
1969	1	0
1970	4	1
Total	5	1

== Awards ==
- Japan Soccer League Fighting Spirit Award: 1968
