= Tadahiko Ueda =

Japanese footballer

Tadahiko Ueda 上田 忠彦
- Ueda in 1971

Personal information
- Full name: Tadahiko Ueda
- Date of birth: August 3, 1947
- Place of birth: Kyoto, Japan
- Date of death: April 15, 2015 (aged 67)
- Place of death: Japan
- Position: Forward

Youth career
- 1963–1965: Kyoto Commercial High School
- 1966–1969: Hosei University

Senior career*
Years	Team	Apps	(Gls)
1970–1973	Nippon Steel	60	(25)
Total		60	(25)

International career
1970–1971	Japan	13	(7)
- * Club domestic league appearances and goals

Tadahiko Ueda (上田 忠彦, Ueda Tadahiko; August 3, 1947 – April 15, 2015) was a Japanese football player. He played for Japan national team.

== Club career ==
Ueda was born in Kyoto Prefecture on August 3, 1947. After graduating from Hosei University, he joined Nippon Steel in 1970. He was selected Best Eleven in first season. He retired in 1973. He played 60 games and scored 25 goals in the league.

== National team career ==
On August 2, 1970, Ueda debuted for Japan national team against South Korea. In December, he was selected Japan for 1970 Asian Games. He played at 1972 Summer Olympics qualification in 1971. This qualification was his last game for Japan. He played 13 games and scored 7 goals for Japan until 1971.

On April 15, 2015, Ueda died of lung cancer at the age of 67.

== National team statistics ==
Japan national team
Year	Apps	Goals
1970	10	7
1971	3	0
Total	13	7

== Awards ==
- Japan Soccer League Best Eleven: 1970
