= 1970 Japan Soccer League =

Japan Soccer League
- Season: 1970
- Teams: 8
- Champions: Toyo Industries; 5st title
- Runner up: Mitsubishi Motors
- Matches: 56
- Goals: 179 (3.2 per match)
- Top goalscorer: Kunishige Kamamoto(16 goals)

The 1970 season of the Japan Soccer League was the sixth season of Japanese league football. Toyo Industries won their fifth title and set the record for title wins, but they would not regain the title during the rest of the JSL's existence and would not win the successor league, the J. League Division 1, until 2012.

== Japan Soccer League ==
Pos	Team	Pld	W	D	L	GF	GA	GD	Pts	Qualification
1	Toyo Industries	14	11	1	2	33	5	+28	23	Champions
2	Mitsubishi Motors	14	7	4	3	24	13	+11	18	
3	Hitachi	14	6	4	4	21	18	+3	16	
4	Yanmar Diesel	14	7	1	6	26	21	+5	15	
5	Furukawa Electric	14	5	4	5	21	21	0	14	
6	Nippon Steel	14	5	3	6	31	29	+2	13	
7	Nippon Kokan	14	3	2	9	14	38	−24	8	To promotion/relegation Series
8	Nagoya Mutual Bank	14	1	3	10	9	34	−25	5	To promotion/relegation Series

Source: RSSSF

=== Promotion/relegation Series ===
JSL	1st leg	2nd leg	Senior Cup
Nippon Kokan	4-0	3-0	Kofu SC (Cup runner-up)
Nagoya Mutual Bank	1-0	1-1	Toyota Motors (Cup winner)

No relegations.

== Team of the Year ==
Position	Footballer	Club	Nationality
GK	Koji Funamoto (1)	Toyo Industries	Japan
DF	Hiroshi Katayama (5)	Mitsubishi Motors	Japan
DF	Minoru Kobata (1)	Hitachi	Japan
DF	Yoshitada Yamaguchi (3)	Hitachi	Japan
DF	Daishiro Yoshimura (1)	Yanmar Diesel	Japan
MF	Aritatsu Ogi (5)	Toyo Industries	Japan
MF	Ryuichi Sugiyama (5)	Mitsubishi Motors	Japan
MF	Teruki Miyamoto (5)	Nippon Steel	Japan
MF	Takaji Mori (2)	Mitsubishi Motors	Japan
FW	Kunishige Kamamoto (3)	Yanmar Diesel	Japan
FW	Tadahiko Ueda (1)	Nippon Steel	Japan
