= Minoru Kobata =

Japanese footballer

Minoru Kobata 小畑 穣
Personal information
- Full name: Minoru Kobata
- Date of birth: November 24, 1946 (age 79)
- Place of birth: Saitama, Saitama, Empire of Japan
- Height: 1.73 m (5 ft 8 in)
- Position: Midfielder

Youth career
- 1962–1964: Johoku High School
- 1965–1968: Meiji University

Senior career*
Years	Team	Apps	(Gls)
1969–1975	Hitachi	99	(22)
Total		99	(22)

International career
1970–1973	Japan	13	(0)
Medal record
Hitachi
Winner	Japan Soccer League	1972
Runner-up	Japan Soccer League	1973
Winner	Emperor's Cup	1972
Winner	Emperor's Cup	1975
Runner-up	Emperor's Cup	1973
- * Club domestic league appearances and goals

Minoru Kobata (小畑 穣, Kobata Minoru; born November 24, 1946) is a former Japanese football player. He played for Japan national team.

== Club career ==
Kobata was born in Saitama on November 24, 1946. After graduating from Meiji University, he joined Hitachi in 1969. In 1972, the club won the Japan Soccer League and the Emperor's Cup. The club also won the 1975 Emperor's Cup. He retired in 1975. He played 99 games and scored 22 goals in the league. He was selected as one of the Best Eleven in 1970.

== National team career ==
On July 31, 1970, Kobata debuted for Japan national team against Hong Kong. In December, he was selected Japan for 1970 Asian Games. He also played at 1974 World Cup qualification in 1973. He played 13 games for Japan until 1973.

== Club statistics ==
Club performance			League	
Season	Club	League	Apps	Goals
Japan			League	
1969	Hitachi	JSL Division 1	13	0
1970	Hitachi	JSL Division 1	14	2
1971	Hitachi	JSL Division 1	12	1
1972	Hitachi	JSL Division 1	12	6
1973	Hitachi	JSL Division 1	14	4
1974	Hitachi	JSL Division 1	17	4
1975	Hitachi	JSL Division 1	17	5
Total			99	22

== National team statistics ==
Japan national team
Year	Apps	Goals
1970	11	0
1971	0	0
1972	0	0
1973	2	0
Total	13	0

== Awards ==
- Japan Soccer League Best Eleven: 1970
