= P. K. Banerjee =

Indian footballer and coach (1936–2020)

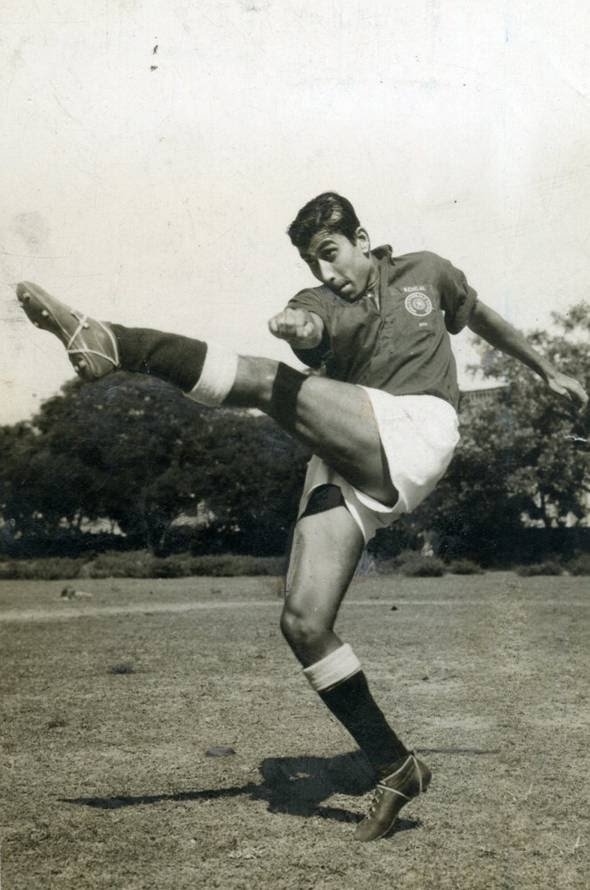
- Banerjee during his playing days with India

Personal information
- Full name: Pradip Kumar Banerjee
- Date of birth: 23 June 1936
- Place of birth: Jalpaiguri, Bengal Presidency, British India
- Date of death: 20 March 2020 (aged 83)
- Place of death: Kolkata, West Bengal, India
- Height: 1.74 m (5 ft 8 1/2 in)
- Position: Striker

Youth career
- 1951: Bihar

Senior career*
Years	Team	Apps	(Gls)
1953–1954	Jamshedpur SA		
1954	Aryan	22	(10)
1955–1967	Eastern Railway	224	(91)

International career
1955–1966	India	50 (Note: RSSSF includes the matches played against South Korean XI in 1964 and Japan XI in 1965 on their list. But it is considered unofficial by other sources.)	(15)

Managerial career
- Bata
- Eastern Railway
- 1972–1976: East Bengal
- Mohun Bagan
- 1971–1974: India
- 1980–1981: East Bengal
- 1981–1982: India
- 1983–1984: East Bengal
- 1985: East Bengal
- 1985–1986: India
- 1988–1990: East Bengal
- 2003–2004: Mohammedan Sporting
Medal record
Men's football
Representing India
Asian Games
Gold medal – first place	1962 Jakarta	Team
AFC Asian Cup
Runner-up	1964 Israel	Team
- * Club domestic league appearances and goals

Pradip Kumar Banerjee FIFAOM (23 June 1936 – 20 March 2020) was an Indian professional footballer who played as a striker for the India national football team. He also captained the national team and later on became the coach of the national team. He represented India in 50 official matches and scored 15 official goals for the country. (Note: RSSSF includes the matches played against South Korean XI in 1964 and Japan XI in 1965 on their list. But it is considered unofficial by other sources.) He was one of the first recipients of Arjuna Award, when the awards were instituted in 1961. He was awarded the prestigious Padma Shri in 1990 and was named Indian Footballer of the 20th century by IFFHS. In 2004, he was awarded the FIFA Order of Merit, the highest honour awarded by FIFA.

Banerjee died on 20 March 2020 at 12:40 p.m. after suffering from age-related issues, having been on life support at a Kolkata hospital since 2 March. He also had an underlying history of Parkinson's disease, dementia and heart problems.

== Early life ==
Pradip Kumar Banerjee was born on 23 June 1936, in Jalpaiguri in Bengal Presidency (now West Bengal). He studied in Jalpaiguri Zilla School and completed his schooling from K.M.P.M. School in Jamshedpur.

== Playing career ==
I had an insatiable hunger for football. It wasn't necessary for me to play for the big two clubs.

— Banerjee on his club football career

At the age of 15, Banerjee represented Bihar in Santosh Trophy, playing in the right wing. He later represented Railways and Bengal in the same tournament. In 1953, he joined Jamshedpur FA and made his debut against Hindustan Aircrafts [sic] Limited in IFA Shield. In 1954, he moved on to Kolkata and joined Aryan. Later he went on to represent Eastern Railway, and played under coaching of both Bagha Some and Sushil Bhattacharya, who guided them winning CFL in 1958. In that CFL season, he scored twelve goals and emerged top scorer. They also won DCM Trophy in 1957, and Bordoloi Trophy in 1967. He scored 14 goals for his team in 1959 season of CFL.

He made his international debut for India at the 1955 Asian Quadrangular Tournament in Dacca (presently Dhaka), East Pakistan (now capital of Bangladesh) at the age of 19. He represented India in three Asian Games namely, the 1958 Asian Games in Tokyo, the 1962 Asian Games in Jakarta, where India clinched the gold medal in football and then the 1966 Asian Games in Bangkok. He was part of the national team that played at the 1956 Summer Olympics in Melbourne. In that tournament, they reached the semi-finals, before going down 1–4 to Yugoslavia, which is still considered India's greatest ever achievement in football. He captained India at the 1960 Summer Olympics in Rome, where he scored an equalizer against France in a 1–1 draw. He represented India thrice at the Merdeka Cup in Kuala Lumpur, where India won a silver medal in 1959 and 1964 and a bronze medal in 1965. In 1961 Merdeka Cup, he played under Sailen Manna.

He had a tremendous burst of speed. His main asset was that he could score particularly from an angle, from inside the box or outside. He also had a good header and was a good passer, setting his teammates up from the wing with accurate crosses.

— Gautam Roy, football historian, on P. K. Banerjee to the Olympic Channel.

Banerjee, known for having incredible partnership with Chuni Goswami and Tulsidas Balaram, is one of the "Indian football's holy trinity". Recurring injuries forced him to drop out of the national team and subsequently to his retirement in 1967.

== International statistics ==
International "A" matches only (Note: RSSSF includes the matches played against South Korean XI in 1964 and Japan XI in 1965 on their list. But it is considered unofficial by other sources.)

India national team
Year	Apps	Goals
1955	3	5
1956	4	2
1958	5	0
1959	6	2
1960	5	1
1961	3	1
1962	5	4
1963	2	0
1964	9	0
1965	5	0
1966	3	0
Total	50	15

=== International goals ===
International A matches are listed. (Note: RSSSF includes the matches played against South Korean XI in 1964 and Japan XI in 1965 on their list. But it is considered unofficial by other sources.)

Date	Venue	Opponent	Result	Competition	Goals
18 December 1955	Dacca, East Pakistan	Ceylon	4–3	1955 Colombo Cup	2
22 December 1955	Dacca, East Pakistan	Burma	5–2	1955 Colombo Cup	2
24 December 1955	Dacca, East Pakistan	Pakistan	2–1	1955 Colombo Cup	1
12 December 1956	Sydney Sports Ground, Sydney	Australia	7–1	International Friendly	2
27 August 1959	Ghazi Stadium, Kabul	Afghanistan	5–2	1960 Olympic qualifier	1
8 September 1959	City Stadium, Penang	South Korea	1–1	International Friendly	1
29 August 1960	Stadio Olimpico Comunale, Grosseto, Italy	France	1–1	1960 Olympics	1
9 August 1961	Kuala Lumpur, Malaya	Malaya	2–1	1961 Merdeka Tournament	1
28 August 1962	Senayan Stadium, Jakarta	Thailand	4–1	1962 Asian Games	2
29 August 1962	Senayan Stadium, Jakarta	Japan	2–0	1962 Asian Games	1
4 September 1962	Senayan Stadium, Jakarta	South Korea	2–1	1962 Asian Games	1

== Managerial career ==
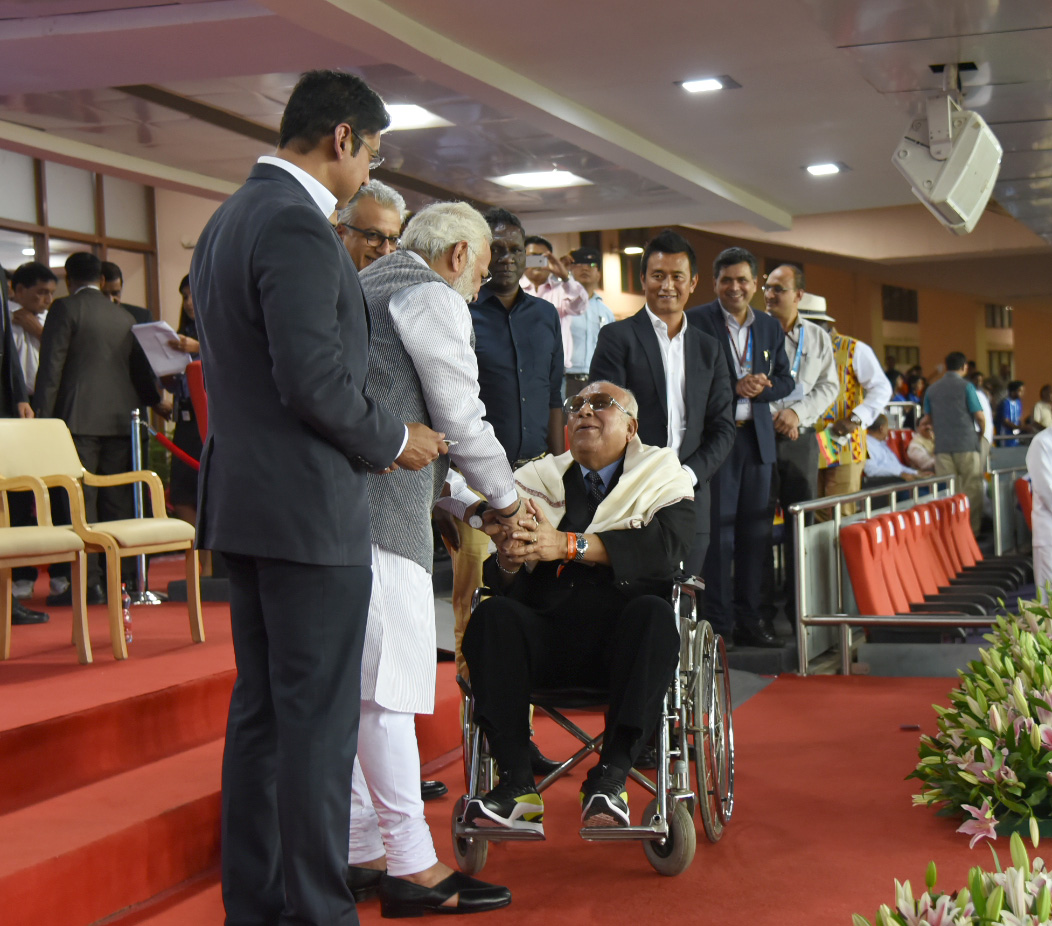
Banerjee being felicitated by the Prime Minister of India Narendra Modi at the opening ceremony of 2017 FIFA U-17 World Cup at the Jawaharlal Nehru Stadium

After retirement, Banerjee went to Japan and attended the earliest known coaching course conducted by FIFA in 1969, under German coach Dettmar Cramer, and gained a first-Class degree. As one of the finest coaches in the history of Indian football, Banerjee came to be known for his inspirational pep talk to players termed as "vocal tonic" before games. He managed India national team at the 1970 Asian Games in Bangkok, Thailand and led them clinching bronze medal. In that tournament, he had players like captain Syed Nayeemuddin, Sukalyan Ghosh Dastidar, Shyam Thapa, Mohammed Habib, Magan Singh. The next year in 1971, he gave India an international title, winning Pesta Sukan Cup in Singapore.

Banerjee began his coaching career in Bata SC, and then went on to manage his older club Eastern Railway. His first big coaching stint came with East Bengal, joining the Kolkata giant as manager in 1972. Throughout Banerjee's managerial career, he would frequently return to manage East Bengal.He managed East Bengal when they trounced arch rival Mohun Bagan 5–0 in the 1975 IFA Shield final, the biggest ever margin in Kolkata derbies. He managed Mohun Bagan in the historic match against a star-studded New York Cosmos spearheaded by Pelé on 24 September 1977, in which both the teams shared honours as the match ended 2–2. Under his guidance, Mohun Bagan's performance against the American club featuring Pelé, Carlos Alberto Torres and Giorgio Chinaglia, earned popularity worldwide.

Banerjee's Mohun Bagan against NY Cosmos.

In 1976, Banerjee joined Mohun Bagan, guiding the club to a historic feat, winning the IFA Shield, Rovers Cup and Durand Cup respectively to achieve their first-ever triple-crown triumph in one season. He became the national coach in 1972, starting with the qualifying matches of the 1972 Munich Olympics. He went on to coach the Indian Football Team till 1986.

At the 1982 Asian Games held in New Delhi, Banerjee managed India national team and took Syed Shahid Hakim as assistant manager. In 1983, he came back to East Bengal and managed a until 1984, and again in 1985. He gave them a Federation Cup, which let the club qualified for 1985–86 Asian Club Championship. As part of Central Asia Zone (tournament was named "Coca-Cola Cup"), his team defeated New Road Team of Nepal by 7–0 to start their campaign, where Biswajit Bhattacharya netted four goals, also beat Dhaka Abahani 1–0, Club Valencia 9–0. That 9–0 result against the Maldivian outfit is still the biggest margin of victory by an Indian team over any foreign opponents. Banerjee led the East Bengal to sixteen major trophies in four seasons which included seven Calcutta League titles, four IFA Shield titles, three Rovers Cup titles, two DCM trophies, two Bordoloi Trophy wins and one Durand Cup title. His one of the finest Kolkata Derby games as head coach of East Bengal was the semi-final of 1997 Federation Cup, one of the most anticipated matches in Indian football history, in which he guided the club in front of 131,000+ spectators at the Vivekananda Yuba Bharati Krirangan, a 4–1 win against Amal Dutta's Mohun Bagan. Afterwards, this match came to be known as Diamond Demolition Derby among East Bengal faithfuls.

He joined the Tata Football Academy in Jamshedpur and served as its technical director from 1991 to 1997. Banerjee was awarded the player of the Millennium in 2005 by FIFA. He had also won the International Fair Play Award from the Olympic Committee, a feat that is yet to be repeated by any Indian footballer. In 1999, he again took up the post of the technical director of the Indian Football team. He also became coach of Mohammedan Sporting in 2003, and then served as technical director of the club.

During his coaching days in Kolkata football, Banerjee had a fierce rivalry with Amal Dutta, witnessed during the days of Kolkata Derby.

== Death ==
Banerjee died on 20 March 2020 at a hospital in Kolkata. He was suffering from chest infection for a few weeks. He is survived by his two daughters Paula and Purna. His brother Prasun Banerjee is also a renowned footballer who captained India.

== Legacy ==
At the 123rd edition of the prestigious IFA Shield, Best Coach of the tournament award was renamed as 'P. K. Banerjee Memorial Award for the Best Coach' in honour of Banerjee.

On 12 May 2023, the All India Football Federation (AIFF) declared Banerjee's birth anniversary as "AIFF Grassroots Day", keeping in line with the strategic roadmap named Vision 2047, which seeks to increase grassroots' participation in the country, to engage 35 million children in football by 2026 and up to 100 million by 2047.

== Honours ==
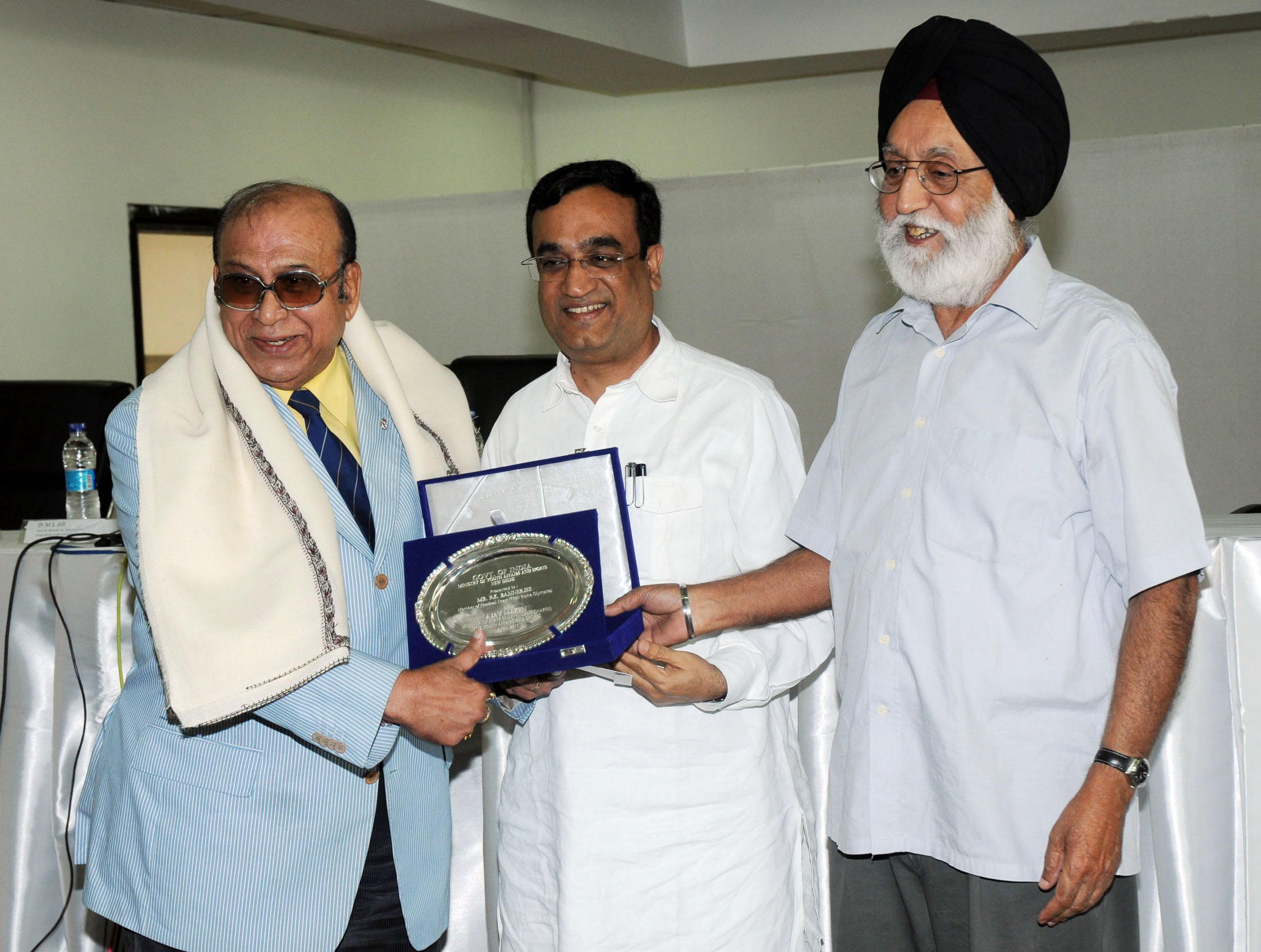
Banerjee at the felicitation ceremony of the members of 1960 Rome Olympics Indian football team, organised by the Ministry of Youth Affairs & Sports, in New Delhi, April 13, 2011.

=== Player ===
India

- Asian Games Gold Medal: 1962
- AFC Asian Cup runners-up: 1964
- Asian Quadrangular Football Tournament: 1955
- Merdeka Tournament runner-up: 1959, 1964; third-place: 1965

Bengal

- Santosh Trophy: 1955–56, 1958–59, 1959–60

Eastern Railway

- Calcutta Football League: 1958
- DCM Trophy: 1957
- Bordoloi Trophy: 1967

Railways

- Santosh Trophy: 1961–62, 1966–67

=== Manager ===
India

- Asian Games bronze medal: 1970
- Pesta Sukan Cup (Singapore): 1971
- South Asian Games Gold medal: 1985

East Bengal

- CFL: 1972-73, 1973-74, 1974-75, 1975-76, 1985-86, 1988-89, 1989-90
- IFA Shield: 1972-73, 1973-74, 1974-75, 1975-76, 1983-84
- Federation Cup: 1980–81, 1985-86
- Rovers Cup: 1972-73, 1973-74, 1974-75, 1975-76, 1980-81

Mohun Bagan

- Federation Cup: 1978–79

=== Individual ===
- Padma Shri in 1990
- Arjuna Award in 1961.
- Listed as Indian Footballer of 20th Century by IFFHS.
- FIFA Order of Merit (Centennial), highest honour by FIFA in 2004
- Banerjee is the only footballer from Asia who has been awarded the FAIR PLAY Award.
- Mohun Bagan Ratna: 2011
- Bharat Nirman Awards — Lifetime Achievement: 2011
- Football Players' Association of India Lifetime Achievement Award: 2013–14
- East Bengal "Coach of Coaches Award": 2019
- Banga Bibhushan: 2013
- Sportskeeda All time Indian Football XI
- Calcutta Football League top scorer: 1958 (12 goals)

== See also ==
- Arjuna award recipients among Indian footballers
- List of National Sports Award recipients in Olympic sports
- List of India national football team captains
- List of India national football team managers
- India national football team at the Olympics
- Football at the Asian Games
- List of association football families
