= Mohammed Habib (footballer) =

Indian footballer (1949–2023)

Personal information
- Date of birth: 17 July 1949
- Place of birth: Hyderabad, Hyderabad State, India
- Date of death: 15 August 2023 (aged 74)
- Position: Forward

Senior career*
Years	Team	Apps	(Gls)
?	City College Old Boys' Club		
1966–1968	East Bengal		
1968–1969	Mohun Bagan		
1970–1974	East Bengal		
1975	Mohammedan S.C.		
1976–78	Mohun Bagan		
1979	Mohammedan S.C.		
1980–81	East Bengal		
1982–84	Mohun Bagan		

International career
1965–1975	India	35	(11)
Medal record
Men's football
Representing India
Asian Games
Bronze medal – third place	1970 Bangkok	Team
- * Club domestic league appearances and goals

Mohammed Habib (17 July 1949 – 15 August 2023) was an Indian footballer who played as a forward for the India national team which he also captained. He is also considered by many Indians as one of the best footballers the country has ever produced. He was popularly known as Bade Mia in the Indian football world.

== Club career ==
In 1968, Habib played for the Calcutta Football League club Mohun Bagan under "diamond coach" Amal Dutta, and won the 1969 IFA Shield with a 3–1 victory against East Bengal in the final.

Although hailing from the state of Andhra Pradesh (now Telangana), he represented Bengal in the Santosh Trophy. For the 1969–70 Santosh Trophy, Habib, along with Priya Mazumder and Pranab Ganguly were released from the Indian camp for the Merdeka Cup. The Bengal forwards ran riot and scored 28 goals in five matches. Habib scored five goals in Bengal's 6–1 win over Services in the final and finished as the top scorer of the tournament with 11 goals.

== International career ==
Habib represented the India national team in international tournaments. He won a bronze medal at the 1970 Asian Games in Bangkok on a team led by Syed Nayeemuddin and managed by P. K. Banerjee. He scored 11 goals in 35 international matches.

== International goals ==
FIFA "A" international statistics

Date	Venue	Opponent	Result	Competition	Goals
3 November 1969	Stadium Merdeka, Kuala Lumpur	Singapore	3–0	1969 Merdeka Cup	1
9 August 1970	Perak Stadium, Ipoh	South Vietnam	2–1	1970 Merdeka Cup	1
12 August 1970	Stadium Merdeka, Kuala Lumpur	South Korea	2–3	1970 Merdeka Cup	1
15 August 1970	Stadium Merdeka, Kuala Lumpur	Hong Kong	3–2	1970 Merdeka Cup	1
11 December 1970	Chulalongkorn University Stadium, Bangkok	South Vietnam	2–0	1970 Asian Games	1
5 August 1971	Stadium Merdeka, Kuala Lumpur	Philippines	5–1	1971 Merdeka Cup	1
7 August 1971	Stadium Merdeka, Kuala Lumpur	Indonesia	1–3	1971 Merdeka Cup	1
23 August 1971	Jalan Besar Stadium, Kallang	Indonesia	2–1	1971 Pestasukan Cup	2
26 August 1971	Jalan Besar Stadium, Kallang	Malaysia	6–0	1971 Pestasukan Cup	2

== Managerial career ==
After playing football, Habib became coach of the Tata Football Academy. He also acted as chief coach of the Indian Football Association academy in Haldia.

Habib guided Mohammedan Sporting in domestic competitions from 1999–2000, 2000–2003 and 2005. He also managed Bengal Mumbai FC in the Mumbai Football League from 2007 to 2008.

== Death ==
Mohammed Habib died on 15 August 2023 at the age of 74, after suffering from Parkinson's disease and dementia.

== Honours ==
Bengal

- Santosh Trophy: 1969-70

East Bengal

- IFA Shield: 1970, 1972, 1974
- Federation Cup: 1980–81

India

- Asian Games Bronze Medal: 1970
- Merdeka Tournament third place: 1970
- Pesta Sukan Cup (Singapore): 1971

Mohun Bagan

- IFA Shield: 1969, 1977, 1978
- Federation Cup: 1978–79

Individual

- Santosh Trophy top scorer: 1969-70 (with 11 goals)

Awards

- Arjuna Award: 1980
- East Bengal "Bharat Gaurav Award": 2015
- Banga Bibhushan: 2018 (by the Government of West Bengal)

== See also ==
- Arjuna award recipients among Indian footballers
- List of India national football team captains

== Bibliography ==
- Kapadia, Novy (2017). Barefoot to Boots: The Many Lives of Indian Football. Penguin Random House. ISBN 978-0-143-42641-7.
- Martinez, Dolores; Mukharjiim, Projit B (2009). Football: From England to the World: The Many Lives of Indian Football. Routledge. ISBN 978-1-138-88353-6. Archived from the original on 2 July 2022.
- Nath, Nirmal (2011). History of Indian Football: Upto 2009–10. Readers Service. ISBN 9788187891963. Archived from the original on 22 July 2022.
- Dineo, Paul; Mills, James (2001). Soccer in South Asia: Empire, Nation, Diaspora. London, United Kingdom: Frank Cass Publishers. ISBN 978-0-7146-8170-2. Archived from the original on 25 July 2022.
- "Triumphs and Disasters: The Story of Indian Football, 1889—2000" (PDF). Archived from the original (PDF) on 13 August 2012.
- Majumdar, Boria; Bandyopadhyay, Kausik (2006). A Social History Of Indian Football: Striving To Score. Routledge. ISBN 9780415348355. Archived from the original on 29 June 2021.
- Basu, Jaydeep (2003). Stories from Indian Football. UBS Publishers' Distributors. ISBN 9788174764546. Archived from the original on 11 October 2022.
