= Shyam Thapa =

Indian footballer and manager

Personal information
- Full name: Shyam Thapa
- Date of birth: 10 May 1948 (age 78)
- Place of birth: Gulmi District, Nepal

Senior career*
Years	Team	Apps	(Gls)
1966	East Bengal		
1967–1969	Gorkha Brigade		
1971–1974	Mafatlal Mills		
1975–1976	East Bengal		
1977–1982	Mohun Bagan		

International career
1970–1977	India		

Managerial career
- 1985–1988: East Bengal
- 1990: East Bengal
- 2006–2007: Nepal
Medal record
Men's football
Representing India
Asian Games
Bronze medal – third place	1970 Bangkok	Team
- * Club domestic league appearances and goals

Shyam Thapa is a former footballer and coach. Born in Nepal, he represented the India national football team and was the bronze-medallist at the 1970 Asian Games. He later went on to manage the Nepal national football team.

Coached by P. K. Banerjee, Thapa became one of the finest and aggressive strikers of the country during the 1970s, known for his bicycle-kicks.

== Playing career ==
Shyam Thapa was first discovered when he scored the match winner for Gorkha Military Higher Secondary School (HSS) against Anjuman Islam Higher secondary school, Mumbai in the 1964 Subroto Mukherjee Cup final. The East Bengal supremo Jyotish Chandra Guha, who had a good eye for talent, signed him for the 1966 season. Shyam made a memorable debut as a precocious 18-year-old in the 1966 Calcutta Football League, scoring a hat-trick against Rajasthan Club. Afterwards, he returned to Gorkha Brigade and played for them from 1967–1969. Thapa later participated in the prestigious Merchant's Cup, hosted by Calcutta Cricket and Football Club.

His finest hour came in the 1969 Durand final when he scored an opportunistic match winner in the reply against redoubtable Border Security Force (BSF). General Maneckshaw witnessed that match and invited the entire Gorkha Brigade team for a party the next day. At that party, Shyam requested Maneckshaw, who became a Field Marshal later, to release him from the army so that he could pursue his career as a professional. The General agreed and Shyam Thapa joined East Bengal again in 1970.

In 1970, Thapa helped India win bronze medal in Merdeka tournament. In that year, he won bronze at the Bangkok Asian Games, with P. K. Banerjee managed and Syed Nayeemuddin captained team. He scored in India's 3–0 win over Indonesia in the 1970 Asian Games and also in the 3–1 win over Malaysia in the Merdeka tournament. That year, East Bengal played in the 4–2–4 system and their quintet of forwards Swapan Sengupta, Ashok Chatterjee, Mohammed Habib and Shyam Thapa were all short-statured but explosive, skilful and a delight to watch with their flair and incessant attacking play. They were brilliant in the Durand tournament which East Bengal won by easily overcoming RAC Bikaner, Sikh Regimental Centre (SRC) Meerut, Mafatlal Mills and Mohun Bagan 2–0 in the final.

Shyam Thapa's career, however, suffered a setback. His family was worried about the increasing Naxalite violence in Kolkata and asked him to leave. He took a transfer to Mafatlal Mills, Bombay and linked up with former Gorkha Brigade players like Ranjit Thapa, Bhupender Singh Rawat and Amar Bahadur. He stayed with Mafatlal Mills from 1971–74.

However, he soon rejoined East Bengal in 1975. He was by then an established superstar and had a memorable 1975–76 season. Coached by P. K. Banerjee, East Bengal won the Kolkata league for a record sixth year in a row and in the IFA Shield final routed eternal rivals Mohun Bagan 5–0, a record score in a final. Shyam scored some memorable goals for East Bengal in those two years.

He became India's most sought after player and in the 1977–78 season, Mohun Bagan paid a record fee of Rs. 50,000 for his services. He was the highest paid player in India that year and helped Bagan win a historic treble – IFA Shield, Rovers Cup and Durand tournament, in a single season and his brilliant goal against rivals East Bengal in an IFA league match with a back volley is still remembered. It was the first time Bagan achieved this feat. In the Durand Cup final, he scored the equalizer against JCT, darting onto a rebound from goalkeeper Surjeet Singh and bulging the net. In the replay, he set up the match winner for Mohammed Akbar.

From 1977–1980, he figured in four consecutive Durand finals for Mohun Bagan winning in 1977, 1979 and 1980 and losing 0–3 to East Bengal in the 1978 final. During the same period, Mohun Bagan also won the IFA Shield thrice in a row, 1977–79 and the Rovers Cup in 1977. From 1970–77, he was a regular in the Indian team. He played as striker in Mohun Bagan's historic match against a star-studded New York Cosmos spearheaded by Pelé on 24 September 1977, in which both the teams shared honours as the match ended 2–2. Under P. K. Banerjee's guidance, their performance against the American club featuring Pelé, Carlos Alberto Torres and Giorgio Chinaglia, earned popularity worldwide.

However, after the 1978 Srinagar National championships, he was surprisingly omitted from the list of probables for the 1978 Asian Games. The national selectors claimed that he was slowing down and would not be able to cope with the rigours of international football. There was a major hue and cry in the national media at Shyam's unfair omission.

Thapa also represented Services football team in Santosh Trophy.

== Retirement and post football life ==
Reacting to the media criticism, Field Marshal Sam Maneckshaw, boss of the All India Council of Sports (AICS) intervened and invited Shyam to join the training camp being held in Patiala. However he announced his retirement from international football. Being denied the captaincy of the Indian team in the 1978 Asian Games has been Shyam's biggest disappointment in his otherwise glittering career.

After his playing career was over, he was technical director at the Williamson Magor Academy in Assam which later closed down and later at the Tata Football Academy. Such is Shyam Thapa's fame that Nepal called him to revamp their football system in the 21st century and he was there in the first decade of the 21st century. He also managed East Bengal Club in the late 1980s. He later served as the chairman of All India Football Federation technical committee, before AIFF faced suspension from the FIFA. Thapa is also a member of the CC&FC, and felicitated by the club, which is Asia's oldest sports club founded in the late 18th century.

== Honours and achievements ==
I am extremely thankful to the Mohun Bagan supporters and officials for conferring me the highest honour of the club. I spent seven memorable years with the club and had the fortune of being a part of an extremely talented team that won many trophies and titles across the country.

— Shyam Thapa, after receiving the "Mohun Bagan Ratna" award at the club tent in July 2022.

India

- Asian Games Bronze Medal: 1970
- Merdeka Tournament third place: 1970
- Pesta Sukan Cup (Singapore): 1971

Services

- Santosh Trophy runner-up: 1969–70

East Bengal

- IFA Shield: 1970, 1975

Mohun Bagan

- Federation Cup: 1978–79, 1980–81

Individual

- Banga Bhushan: 2014 (by the Government of West Bengal)
- Mohun Bagan Ratna: 2022
- East Bengal "Lifetime Achievement Award": 2016
- Sportstar Aces Lifetime Achievement Award: 2023

== Bibliography ==
- Kapadia, Novy (2017). Barefoot to Boots: The Many Lives of Indian Football. Penguin Random House. ISBN 978-0-143-42641-7.
- Majumdar, Boria; Bandyopadhyay, Kausik (2006). A Social History Of Indian Football: Striving To Score. Routledge. ISBN 9780415348355. Archived from the original on 29 June 2021.
- Basu, Jaydeep (2003). Stories from Indian Football. UBS Publishers' Distributors. ISBN 9788174764546. Archived from the original on 11 October 2022.
- Dineo, Paul; Mills, James (2001). Soccer in South Asia: Empire, Nation, Diaspora. London, United Kingdom: Frank Cass Publishers. p. 33. ISBN 978-0-7146-8170-2. Archived from the original on 25 July 2022.
- Majumdar, Boria, Bandyopadhyay, Kausik (2006). Goalless: The Story of a Unique Footballing Nation. Penguin India. ISBN 9780670058747.
- Martinez, Dolores; Mukharjiim, Projit B (2009). Football: From England to the World: The Many Lives of Indian Football. Routledge. ISBN 978-1-138-88353-6. Archived from the original on 2 July 2022.
- Nath, Nirmal (2011). History of Indian Football: Upto 2009–10. Readers Service. ISBN 9788187891963. Archived from the original on 22 July 2022.
- "Triumphs and Disasters: The Story of Indian Football, 1889—2000" (PDF). Archived from the original (PDF) on 13 August 2012.
- Mukhopadhay, Subir (2018). সোনায় লেখা ইতিহাসে মোহনবাগান (transl. Mohun Bagan in the history written in gold). ISBN 978-93-850172-0-9.
- Banerjee, Argha; Basu, Rupak (2022). মোহনবাগান: সবুজ ঘাসের মেরুন গল্প (transl. Mohun Bagan: Green fields' Maroon stories). Shalidhan. ISBN 978-81-954667-0-2.
- Roy, Gautam (1 January 2021). East Bengal 100. Allsport Foundation. ISBN 978-8194763109.
- Chattopadhyay, Hariprasad (2017). Mohun Bagan–East Bengal (in Bengali). Kolkata: Parul Prakashan.

== See also ==
- Indian Gorkha
- List of India international footballers born outside India
