= Football at the 1960 Summer Olympics – Group 3 =

Football at the Summer Olympics group

Group 3 of the 1960 Summer Olympics football tournament took place from 26 August to 1 September 1960. The group consisted of Denmark, Poland, Tunisia and Argentina. The top team, Denmark, advanced to the semi-finals.

== Teams ==
Team	Region	Method of qualification	Date of qualification	Finals appearance	Last appearance	Previous best performance							
Team	Region	Method of qualification	Date of qualification	Finals appearance	Last appearance	Previous best performance	Denmark	Europe	Europe Group 1 winners	21 August 1959	6th	1952	Silver medal (1908, 1912, 1960)
Poland	Europe	Europe Group 2 winners	24 November 1959	4th	1952	Fourth place (1936)							
Tunisia	Africa	Africa second round runners-up	17 April 1960	1st	—	—							
Argentina	Americas	Americas second round winners	24 April 1960	2nd	1928	Silver medal (1928)							

== Standings ==
Pos	Team	Pld	W	D	L	GF	GA	GD	Pts	Qualification
1	Denmark	3	3	0	0	8	4	+4	6	Advanced to knockout stage
2	Argentina	3	2	0	1	6	4	+2	4	
3	Poland	3	1	0	2	7	5	+2	2	
4	Tunisia	3	0	0	3	3	11	−8	0	

Source: RSSSF

In the semi-finals, the winners of Group 3, Denmark, advanced to play the winner of Group 4, Hungary.

== Matches ==
All times listed are local, CET (UTC+1).

=== Poland vs Tunisia ===
26 August 1960
16:00

Poland	6–1	Tunisia
Pohl 7', 40', 42', 84', 89'; Hachorek 67'	Report	Kerrit 3'

Stadio Flaminio, Rome
Attendance: 5,873
Referee: Concetto Lo Bello (Italy)

1	Edward Szymkowiak
2	Hubert Pala
3	Jerzy Woźniak
4	Marceli Strzykalski
5	Henryk Szczepański
6	Edmund Zientara (c)
7	Zygmunt Gadecki
8	Lucjan Brychczy
9	Stanisław Hachorek
10	Ernest Pohl
11	Roman Lentner
Substitutions:
	Tomasz Stefaniszyn
	Eugeniusz Faber
	Stefan Florenski
	Stanisław Fołtyn
	Ryszard Grzegorczyk
	Henryk Grzybowski
	Engelbert Jarek
	Marian Norkowski
Manager:
(France) Jean Prouff

1	Khalled Loualid
2	Moncef Chérif
3	Noureddine Diwa
4	Rached Meddeb
5	Brahim Kerrit
7	Ridha Rouatbi
8	Taoufik Ben Othman
9	Larbi Touati
12	Abdel Majid Naji
13	Mohamed Zguir
17	Abdelmajid Chetali
Substitutions:
	Mohamed Ayachi
	Abderrahman Ben Azzedine
	Hamadi Dhaou
	Ali Larbi Hanachi
	Mahmoud Kanoun
	Ali Kelibi
	Ahmed Sghaïer
	Hassen Tasco
Manager:
(Socialist Federal Republic of Yugoslavia) Milan Kristić

Assistant referees:
Fiorenzo Annoscia (Italy)
Gennaro Marchese (Italy)

=== Denmark vs Argentina ===
26 August 1960
21:00

Denmark	3–2	Argentina
Sørensen 31'; H. Nielsen 46', 85'	Report	Oleniak 20'; Bilardo 88'

Stadio Flaminio, Rome
Attendance: 7,154
Referee: Francesco Liverani (Italy)

1	Henry From
2	Poul Andersen
3	Poul Jensen (c)
4	Bent Hansen
5	Hans Christian Nielsen
6	Flemming Nielsen
7	Poul Pedersen
8	John Danielsen
9	Harald Nielsen
10	Henning Enoksen
11	Jørn Sørensen
Substitutions:
	Erik Gaardhøje
	Jørgen Hansen
	Henning Helbrandt
	Bent Krog
	Erling Linde Larsen
	Poul Mejer
	Finn Sterobo
	Tommy Troelsen
Manager:
(Denmark) Arne Sørensen

1	Marwell Periotti
2	Juan Stauskas
3	Salvador Ginel
4	Roberto Blanco
5	Pedro de Ciancio
6	José Díaz
7	Carlos Bilardo
8	Hugo Zarich
9	Mario Desiderio
10	Juan Oleniak
11	Raúl Pérez
Substitutions:
	Roberto Bonnano
	Carlos Grudiña
	Domingo Lejona
	Guillermo Lorenzo
	Julio Mattos
	Alberto Rendo
	Carlos Saldías
Manager:
(Argentina) Ernesto Duchini

Assistant referees:
Giulio Campanati (Italy)
Vincenzo Orlandini (Italy)

=== Tunisia vs Argentina ===
29 August 1960
21:00

Tunisia	1–2	Argentina
Kerrit 25'	Report	Oleniak 15', 82'

Stadio Adriatico, Pescara
Referee: István Zsolt (Hungary)

1	Khalled Loualid
4	Rached Meddeb
5	Brahim Kerrit
7	Ridha Rouatbi
8	Taoufik Ben Othman
9	Larbi Touati
10	Hamadi Dhaou
12	Abdel Majid Naji
16	Abderrahman Ben Azzedine
17	Abdelmajid Chetali
Substitutions:
	Mohamed Ayachi
	Noureddine Diwa
	Moncef Chérif
	Ali Larbi Hanachi
	Mahmoud Kanoun
	Ali Kelibi
	Hassen Tasco
	Mohamed Zguir
14	Ahmed Sghaïer
Manager:
(Socialist Federal Republic of Yugoslavia) Milan Kristić

1	Marwell Periotti
2	Juan Stauskas
3	Salvador Ginel
4	Roberto Blanco
5	Pedro de Ciancio
6	José Díaz
7	Carlos Bilardo
8	Hugo Zarich
9	Mario Desiderio
10	Juan Oleniak
11	Raúl Pérez
Substitutions:
	Roberto Bonnano
	Carlos Grudiña
	Domingo Lejona
	Guillermo Lorenzo
	Julio Mattos
	Alberto Rendo
	Carlos Saldías
Manager:
(Argentina) Ernesto Duchini

Assistant referees:
Giuseppe Adami (Italy)
Carlo Babini (Italy)

=== Denmark vs Poland ===
29 August 1960
21:00

Denmark	2–1	Poland
H. Nielsen 15'; Pedersen 86'	Report	Gadecki 62'

Stadio di Ardenza, Livorno
Attendance: 5,574
Referee: Concetto Lo Bello (Italy)

1	Henry From
2	Poul Andersen
3	Poul Jensen (c)
4	Bent Hansen
5	Hans Christian Nielsen
6	Flemming Nielsen
7	Poul Pedersen
8	John Danielsen
9	Harald Nielsen
10	Henning Enoksen
11	Jørn Sørensen
Substitutions:
	Erik Gaardhøje
	Jørgen Hansen
	Henning Helbrandt
	Bent Krog
	Erling Linde Larsen
	Poul Mejer
	Finn Sterobo
	Tommy Troelsen
Manager:
(Denmark) Arne Sørensen

1	Edward Szymkowiak
2	Hubert Pala
4	Jerzy Woźniak
5	Marceli Strzykalski	Booked
6	Edmund Zientara (c)
7	Zygmunt Gadecki
8	Lucjan Brychczy
9	Stanisław Hachorek
10	Ernest Pohl
11	Roman Lentner
17	Henryk Grzybowski
Substitutions:
Tomasz Stefaniszyn
Eugeniusz Faber
Stefan Florenski
Stanisław Fołtyn
Ryszard Grzegorczyk
Engelbert Jarek
Marian Norkowski
Henryk Szczepański
Manager:
(France) Jean Prouff

Assistant referees:
Giulio Campanati (Italy)
Walter van Rosberg (Netherlands Antilles)

=== Denmark vs Tunisia ===
1 September 1960
21:00

Denmark	3–1	Tunisia
F. Nielsen 24'; H. Nielsen 27', 88'	Report	Cherif 48'

Stadio Tommaso Fattori, L'Aquila
Attendance: 1,204
Referee: Giulio Campanati (Italy)

1	Henry From
2	Poul Andersen
3	Poul Jensen (c)
4	Bent Hansen
5	Hans Christian Nielsen
6	Flemming Nielsen
7	Poul Pedersen
8	Tommy Troelsen
9	Harald Nielsen
10	John Danielsen
11	Jørn Sørensen
Substitutions:
	Henning Enoksen
	Erik Gaardhøje
	Jørgen Hansen
	Henning Helbrandt
	Bent Krog
	Erling Linde Larsen
	Poul Mejer
	Finn Sterobo
Manager:
(Denmark) Arne Sørensen

1	Khalled Loualid
2	Moncef Chérif
4	Rached Meddeb
5	Brahim Kerrit
7	Ridha Rouatbi
8	Taoufik Ben Othman
9	Larbi Touati
10	Hamadi Dhaou
12	Abdel Majid Naji
13	Mohamed Zguir
17	Abdelmajid Chetali
Substitutions:
	Mohamed Ayachi
	Abderrahman Ben Azzedine
	Noureddine Diwa
	Ali Larbi Hanachi
	Mahmoud Kanoun
	Ali Kelibi
	Ahmed Sghaïer
	Hassen Tasco
Manager:
(Socialist Federal Republic of Yugoslavia) Milan Kristić

Assistant referees:
Concetto Lo Bello (Italy)
Francesco Liverani (Italy)

=== Argentina vs Poland ===
1 September 1960
21:00

Argentina	2–0	Poland
Oleniak 38'; Pérez 55'	Report

Stadio San Paolo, Naples
Referee: Sulhi Garan (Turkey)

1	Marwell Periotti
2	Juan Stauskas
3	Salvador Ginel
4	Roberto Blanco
5	Pedro de Ciancio
6	José Díaz
7	Alberto Rendo
8	Hugo Zarich
9	Roberto Bonnano
10	Juan Oleniak
11	Raúl Pérez
Substitutions:
	Carlos Bilardo
	Mario Desiderio
	Carlos Grudiña
	Domingo Lejona
	Guillermo Lorenzo
	Julio Mattos
	Carlos Saldías
Manager:
(Argentina) Ernesto Duchini

16	Tomasz Stefaniszyn
2	Hubert Pala
4	Jerzy Woźniak
5	Marceli Strzykalski
6	Edmund Zientara
7	Zygmunt Gadecki
8	Lucjan Brychczy
9	Stanisław Hachorek
10	Ernest Pohl
11	Roman Lentner
17	Henryk Grzybowski
Substitutions:
	Edward Szymkowiak
	Eugeniusz Faber
	Stefan Florenski
	Stanisław Fołtyn
	Ryszard Grzegorczyk
	Engelbert Jarek
	Marian Norkowski
	Henryk Szczepański
Manager:
(France) Jean Prouff

Assistant referees:
Fiorenzo Annoscia (Italy)
Alfeo Grignani (Netherlands Antilles)

== See also ==
- Denmark at the Olympics
- Poland at the Olympics
- Tunisia at the Olympics
- Argentina at the Olympics
