= Football at the 1960 Summer Olympics – Knockout stage =

The knockout stage of the 1960 Summer Olympics football tournament was the second and final stage of the competition, following the first round. Played from 5 to 10 September, the knockout stage ended with the final held at Stadio Flaminio in Rome, Italy. The top team from each group advanced to the knockout stage to compete in a single-elimination tournament. There were four matches in the knockout stage, including a third place play-off played between the two losing teams of the semi-finals.

== Format ==
The knockout stage of the 1960 Summer Olympics football tournament was contested between four teams that qualified from the first round. Matches in the knockout stage were played to a finish. If the score of a match was level at the end of 90 minutes of playing time, extra time was played. If, after two periods of 15 minutes, the scores were still tied, the match was decided by lots.

== Qualified teams ==
The top placed team from each of the four groups qualified for the knockout stage.

Group	Winners
1	Yugoslavia
2	Italy
3	Denmark
4	Hungary

== Bracket ==
The tournament bracket is shown below, with bold denoting the winners of each match.

Semi-finals
5 September – Naples
Italy	1
**Yugoslavia**	**1**
5 September – Rome
**Denmark**	**2**
Hungary	0

Gold medal match
10 September – Rome
**Yugoslavia**	**3**
Denmark	1
Bronze medal match
9 September – Rome
**Hungary**	**2**
Italy	1

== Semi-finals ==
=== Italy vs Yugoslavia ===
5 September 1960
18:00

Italy	1–1 (a.e.t.)	Yugoslavia
Tumburus 109'	Report	Galić 107'

Stadio San Paolo, Naples
Attendance: 16,568
Referee: Josef Kandlbinder (West Germany)

Yugoslavia declared winners by lot.

**1**	Luciano Alfieri
**3**	Mario Trebbi
**4**	Giorgio Ferrini
**5**	Sandro Salvadore
**6**	Giovanni Trapattoni
**7**	Gianni Rivera
**9**	Ugo Tomeazzi
**13**	Tarcisio Burgnich
**15**	Paride Tumburus
**16**	Orazio Rancati
**18**	Giorgio Rossano
Substitutions:
	Gian Domenico Baldisserri
	Giacomo Bulgarelli
	Giancarlo Cella
	Giovanni Fanello
	Armando Favalli
	Luciano Magistrelli
	Gilberto Noletti
	Ambrogio Pelagalli
Manager:
(Italy) Giuseppe Viani

**12**	Blagoje Vidinić
**2**	Vladimir Durković
**3**	Fahrudin Jusufi
**4**	Ante Žanetić
**6**	Željko Perušić
**8**	Željko Matuš
**9**	Milan Galić
**10**	Tomislav Knez
**11**	Bora Kostić
**13**	Velimir Sombolac
**16**	Aleksandar Kozlina
Substitutions:
	Miluyin Soskic
	Andrija Anković
	Zvonko Bego
	Dušan Maravić
	Žarko Nikolić
	Novak Roganović
	Silvester Takač
Manager:
(Socialist Federal Republic of Yugoslavia) Selection Committee

Assistant referees:
Pierre Schwinte (France)
Raymond Morgan (Wales)

=== Denmark vs Hungary ===
6 September 1960
21:00

Denmark	2–0	Hungary
H. Nielsen 19'; Enoksen 81'	Report

Stadio Flaminio, Rome
Attendance: 14,237
Referee: Reginald Leafe (Great Britain)

**1**	Henry From
**2**	Poul Andersen
**3**	Poul Jensen
**4**	Bent Hansen
**5**	Hans Christian Nielsen
**6**	Flemming Nielsen
**7**	Poul Pedersen
**8**	Tommy Troelsen
**9**	Harald Nielsen
**10**	Henning Enoksen
**11**	Jørn Sørensen
Substitutions:
	John Danielsen
	Erik Gaardhøje
	Jørgen Hansen
	Henning Helbrandt
	Bent Krog
	Erling Linde Larsen
	Poul Mejer
	Finn Sterobo
Manager:
(Denmark) Arne Sørensen

**12**	Gábor Török
**2**	Dezső Novák
**3**	Pál Várhidi
**4**	Jenő Dalnoki
**5**	Oszkár Vilezsál
**6**	Ferenc Kovács
**8**	János Göröcs
**9**	Flórián Albert
**10**	Pál Orosz
**11**	Gyula Rákosi
**16**	János Dunai
Substitutions:
	Lajos Faragó
	Zoltán Dudás
	Kálmán Mészöly
	László Pál
	Tibor Pál
	Imre Sátori
	Ernő Solymosi
	Antal Szentmihályi
Manager:
(Hungary) Béla Volentik

Assistant referees:
Bahri Ben Said (Tunisia)
Suhli Garan (Turkey)

== Bronze medal match ==
9 September 1960
21:00

Hungary	2–1	Italy
Orosz 32'; Dunai 69'	Report	Tomeazzi 84'

Stadio Flaminio, Rome
Referee: Reginald Leafe (Great Britain)

**12**	Gábor Török
**3**	Pál Várhidi
**4**	Jenő Dalnoki	Booked
**6**	Ferenc Kovács
**7**	Imre Sátori
**8**	János Göröcs
**9**	Flórián Albert
**10**	Pál Orosz	Booked
**13**	Zoltán Dudás
**14**	Ernő Solymosi
**16**	János Dunai
Substitutions:
	Lajos Faragó
	Kálmán Mészöly
	Dezső Novák
	László Pál
	Tibor Pál
	Gyula Rákosi
	Antal Szentmihályi
	Oszkár Vilezsál
Manager:
(Hungary) Lajos Baróti

**1**	Luciano Alfieri
**3**	Mario Trebbi
**5**	Sandro Salvadore
**6**	Giovanni Trapattoni
**7**	Gianni Rivera
**9**	Ugo Tomeazzi
**10**	Giacomo Bulgarelli
**13**	Tarcisio Burgnich
**15**	Paride Tumburus
**18**	Giorgio Rossano
**19**	Giancarlo Cella
Substitutions:
	Gian Domenico Baldisserri
	Giovanni Fanello
	Armando Favalli
	Giorgio Ferrini
	Luciano Magistrelli
	Gilberto Noletti
	Ambrogio Pelagalli
	Orazio Rancati
Manager:
(Italy) Giuseppe Viani

Assistant referees:
Josef Kandlbinder (West Germany)
Pierre Schwinte (France)

== Gold medal match ==
10 September 1960
21:00

Yugoslavia	3–1	Denmark
Galić 1'; Matuš 11'; Kostić 69'	Report	F. Nielsen 90'

Stadio Flaminio, Rome
Attendance: 23,042
Referee: Concetto Lo Bello (Italy)

**Yugoslavia**	**Denmark**

GK	12	Blagoje Vidinić
RB	14	Novak Roganović
LB	3	Fahrudin Jusufi
RH	6	Željko Perušić
CH	2	Vladimir Durković	(yellow card) 48'
LH	4	Ante Žanetić
OR	7	Andrija Anković
IR	8	Željko Matuš
CF	9	Milan Galić	(red card) 84'
IL	10	Tomislav Knez
OL	11	Borivoje Kostić
Substitutions:
		Miluyin Soskic
		Zvonko Bego
		Aleksandar Kozlina
		Dušan Maravić
		Žarko Nikolić
		Velimir Sombolac
		Silvester Takač
Manager:
(Socialist Federal Republic of Yugoslavia) Selection Committee

GK	1	Henry From
RB	2	Poul Andersen
LB	3	Poul Jensen
RH	4	Bent Hansen
CH	5	Hans Nielsen
LH	6	Flemming Nielsen	(yellow card) 48'
OR	7	Poul Pedersen
IR	8	Tommy Troelsen
CF	9	Harald Nielsen
IL	10	Henning Enoksen
OL	11	Jørn Sørensen
Substitutions:
		John Danielsen
		Erik Gaardhøje
		Jørgen Hansen
		Henning Helbrandt
		Bent Krog
		Erling Linde Larsen
		Poul Mejer
		Finn Sterobo
Manager:
(Denmark) Arne Sørensen

Assistant referees:
Francesco Liverani (Italy)
Piero Bonetto (Italy)
