= Football at the 1960 Summer Olympics – final =

Men's Football Summer Olympics final, held in Italy

1960 Summer Olympics football final
- Stadio Flaminio in Rome hosted the final
- Event: Football at the 1960 Summer Olympics
Yugoslavia	Denmark
3	1
- Date: 10 September 1960
- Venue: Stadio Flaminio, Rome
- Referee: Concetto Lo Bello (Italy)
- Attendance: 23,042

The 1960 Summer Olympics football tournament gold medal match was the final match of the 1960 Summer Olympics football tournament, the 13th edition of Olympic competition for men's national football teams. The match was played at Stadio Flaminio in Rome, Italy, on 10 September 1960, and was contested by Yugoslavia and Denmark.

The tournament comprised hosts Italy and 15 other teams who emerged victorious from the qualification phase, The 16 teams competed in a group stage in the first round, from which eight teams qualified for the knockout stage. En route to the final, Yugoslavia finished first in Group 1 with two wins and one draw, first winning against United Arab Republic 6–1 and Turkey 4–0, then drawing against Bulgaria 3–3. They then beat hosts Italy in the semi-finals by lots after a 1–1 draw. Denmark finished first in Group 3 with three wins, defeating Argentina 3–2, Poland 2–1 and Tunisia 3–1), and defeating Hungary 2–0 in the semi-finals. The final took place in front of 23,042 spectators and was refereed by Concetto Lo Bello.

Yugoslavia took the lead in the first minute through Milan Galić in the first minute before Željko Matuš further increased their lead in the 11th minute. A third goal was scored for Yugoslavia through Bora Kostić in the 69th minute, only then Denmark scored a consolation goal in the 90th minute by Flemming Nielsen, until Yugoslavia won the match and became gold medalists for 1960.

== Route to the final ==
Yugoslavia
	Opponent	Result
1	United Arab Republic	6–1
2	Turkey	4–0
3	Bulgaria	3–3
SF	Italy	1–1 (a.e.t.)

Denmark
	Opponent	Result
1	Argentina	3–2
2	Poland	2–1
3	Tunisia	3–1
SF	Hungary	2–0

== Match ==
=== Details ===
10 September 1960
21:00

Yugoslavia	3–1	Denmark
Galić 1'; Matuš 11'; Kostić 69'	Report	F. Nielsen 90'

Stadio Flaminio, Rome
Attendance: 23,042
Referee: Concetto Lo Bello (Italy)

Yugoslavia	Denmark

GK	12	Blagoje Vidinić
RB	14	Novak Roganović
LB	3	Fahrudin Jusufi
RH	6	Željko Perušić
CH	2	Vladimir Durković	(yellow card) 48'
LH	4	Ante Žanetić
OR	7	Andrija Anković
IR	8	Željko Matuš
CF	9	Milan Galić	(red card) 84'
IL	10	Tomislav Knez
OL	11	Borivoje Kostić
Substitutions:
GK		Milutin Šoškić
MF		Zvonko Bego
MF		Aleksandar Kozlina
MF		Dušan Maravić
DF		Žarko Nikolić
DF		Velimir Sombolac
FW		Silvester Takač
Manager:
(Socialist Federal Republic of Yugoslavia) Selection Committee

GK	1	Henry From
RB	2	Poul Andersen
LB	3	Poul Jensen
RH	4	Bent Hansen
CH	5	Hans Nielsen
LH	6	Flemming Nielsen	(yellow card) 48'
OR	7	Poul Pedersen
IR	8	Tommy Troelsen
CF	9	Harald Nielsen
IL	10	Henning Enoksen
OL	11	Jørn Sørensen
Substitutions:
GK		Erik Gaardhøje
MF		John Danielsen
FW		Jørgen Hansen
MF		Henning Helbrandt
MF		Bent Krog
DF		Erling Linde Larsen
FW		Poul Mejer
GK		Finn Sterobo
Manager:
(Denmark) Arne Sørensen

Assistant referees:
Francesco Liverani (Italy)
Piero Bonetto (Italy)

== See also ==
- Yugoslavia at the Olympics
- Denmark at the Olympics
