= Football at the 1960 Summer Olympics =

Tournament details
- Host country: Italy
- Dates: 26 August – 10 September
- Teams: 16
- Venues: 7 (in 7 host cities)

Final positions
- Champions: Yugoslavia (1st title)
- Runners-up: Denmark
- Third place: Hungary
- Fourth place: Italy

Tournament statistics
- Matches played: 28
- Goals scored: 120 (4.29 per match)
- Top scorer: (Yugoslavia national football team) Milan Galić (7 goals)

The football tournament at the 1960 Summer Olympics was held from 26 August to 10 September in 1960 throughout Italy. The tournament featured 16 men's national teams from four continental confederations. Starting with this edition, the competition's format was changed: rather than a knockout tournament like in the previous Olympic Games, the 16 teams were drawn into four groups of four and each group played a round-robin tournament, in a similar format to that instituted in the 1958 FIFA World Cup, which persists to the present day. At the end of the group stage, the first-ranked teams of each group advanced to the semi-finals, and culminating with the gold medal match in Rome on 10 September 1960.

== Competition schedule ==
The match schedule of the tournament.

Legend
G	Group stage	¼	Quarter-finals	½	Semi-finals	B	Bronze medal match	F	Gold medal match

26 Fri	27 Sat	28 Sun	29 Mon	30 Tue	31 Wed	1 Thu	2 Fri	3 Sat	4 Sun	5 Mon	6 Tue	7 Wed	8 Thu	9 Fri	10 Sat
G			G			G				½	½			B	F

== Venues ==
Rome	Football at the 1960 Summer Olympics is located in Italy	Florence
Stadio Flaminio	Football at the 1960 Summer Olympics is located in Italy	Stadio Comunale
Capacity: 32,000	Football at the 1960 Summer Olympics is located in Italy	Capacity: 47,920
Grosseto	Football at the 1960 Summer Olympics is located in Italy	Livorno
Stadio Olimpico Comunale	Football at the 1960 Summer Olympics is located in Italy	Stadio Ardenza
Capacity: 10,200	Football at the 1960 Summer Olympics is located in Italy	Capacity: 19,238
Pescara	Naples	L'Aquila
Stadio Adriatico	Stadio Fuorigrotta	Stadio Comunale
Capacity: 24,400	Capacity: 60,240	Capacity: 9,285

== Medalists ==
Gold	Silver	Bronze
Yugoslavia	Denmark	Hungary
Andrija Anković; Zvonko Bego; Vladimir Durković; Milan Galić; Fahrudin Jusufi; Tomislav Knez; Borivoje Kostić; Aleksandar Kozlina; Dušan Maravić; Željko Matuš; Žarko Nikolić; Željko Perušić; Novak Roganović; Velimir Sombolac; Milutin Šoškić; Silvester Takač; Blagoje Vidinić; Ante Žanetić	Poul Andersen; John Danielsen; Henning Enoksen; Henry From; Erik Gaardhøje; Bent Hansen; Jørgen Hansen; Henning Hellbrandt; Poul Jensen; Bent Krog; Erling Linde Larsen; Poul Mejer; Flemming Nielsen; Hans Chr. Nielsen; Harald Nielsen; Poul Pedersen; Jørn Sørensen; Finn Sterobo; Tommy Troelsen	Flórián Albert; Jenő Dalnoki; Zoltán Dudás; János Dunai; Lajos Faragó; János Göröcs; Ferenc Kovács; Dezső Novák; Pál Orosz; Tibor Pál; Gyula Rákosi; Imre Sátori; Ernő Solymosi; Gábor Török; Pál Várhidi; Oszkár Vilezsál

== Teams ==
=== Qualification ===
Africa (2)

- Tunisia
- United Arab Republic

Asia (2)

- India
- Formosa

Americas (3)

- Argentina
- Brazil
- Peru

Europe (8)

- Bulgaria
- Denmark
- France
- Great Britain
- Hungary
- Italy (hosts)
- Poland
- Yugoslavia

Middle East (1)

- Turkey

== First round ==
=== Group 1 ===
Pos	Team	Pld	W	D	L	GF	GA	GD	Pts	Qualification
1	Yugoslavia	3	2	1	0	13	4	+9	5	Advanced to knockout stage
2	Bulgaria	3	2	1	0	8	3	+5	5	
3	United Arab Republic	3	0	1	2	4	11	−7	1	
4	Turkey	3	0	1	2	3	10	−7	1	

Source: RSSSF
26 August 1960
21:00

Bulgaria	3–0	Turkey
Diev 13', 58'; Hristov 67'	Report

Stadio Olimpico Carlo Zecchini, Grosseto
Attendance: 3,760
Referee: Cesare Jonni (Italy)
26 August 1960
21:00

Yugoslavia	6–1	United Arab Republic
Rifai 3' (o.g.); Galić 30' (pen.); Kostić 32', 61', 63'; Knez 49'	Report	Attia 72'

Stadio Adriatico, Pescara
Attendance: 9,211
Referee: Reg Leafe (Great Britain)

29 August 1960
21:00

Bulgaria	2–0	United Arab Republic
Naidenov Yordanov 42'; Diev 88'	Report

Stadio Tommaso Fattori, L'Aquila
Attendance: 1,634
Referee: Leo Helge (Denmark)
29 August 1960
21:00

Yugoslavia	4–0	Turkey
Kostić 10', 89'; Galić 46'; Knez 61'	Report

Stadio Comunale, Florence
Attendance: 1,858
Referee: Vincenzo Orlandini (Italy)

1 September 1960
21:00

Yugoslavia	3–3	Bulgaria
Galić 50', 57', 69'	Report	Kovachev 59'; Debarski 81', 89'

Stadio Flaminio, Rome
Attendance: 7,994
Referee: Cesare Jonni (Italy)
1 September 1960
21:00

United Arab Republic	3–3	Turkey
Attia 10'; Qotb 58', 65'	Report	Tahran 15'; Koken 30'; Yalçınkaya 69'

Stadio di Ardenza, Livorno
Referee: Lucien van Nuffel (Belgium)

=== Group 2 ===
Pos	Team	Pld	W	D	L	GF	GA	GD	Pts	Qualification
1	Italy (H)	3	2	1	0	9	4	+5	5	Advanced to knockout stage
2	Brazil	3	2	0	1	10	6	+4	4	
3	Great Britain	3	1	1	1	8	8	0	3	
4	Formosa	3	0	0	3	3	12	−9	0	

Source: RSSSF
(H) Hosts
26 August 1960
21:00

Italy	4–1	Formosa
Rivera 10', 33'; Fanello 49'; Tomeazzi 67'	Report	Mok Chun Wah 29'

Stadio San Paolo, Naples
Referee: Leo Helge (Denmark)
26 August 1960
21:00

Brazil	4–3	Great Britain
Gérson 2'; China 61', 72'; Wanderley 64'	Report	Brown 32', 87'; Lewis 47'

Stadio di Ardenza, Livorno
Referee: Josef Kandlbinder (West Germany)

29 August 1960
16:00

Brazil	5–0	Formosa
Gérson 13', 16', 47'; Roberto Dias 73', 87'	Report

Stadio Flaminio, Rome
Referee: Emil Erlich (Yugoslavia)
29 August 1960
21:00

Italy	2–2	Great Britain
Rossano 11', 55'	Report	Brown 23'; Hasty 75'

Stadio Flaminio, Rome
Referee: Lucien van Nuffel (Belgium)

1 September 1960
21:00

Italy	3–1	Brazil
Rivera 69'; Rossano 70', 86'	Report	Waldir 4'

Stadio Comunale, Florence
Referee: Pierre Schwinte (France)
1 September 1960
21:00

Great Britain	3–2	Formosa
Lewis 35'; Brown 58'; Hasty 85'	Report	Yiu Cheuk Yin 70', 88'

Stadio Olimpico Comunale, Grosseto
Referee: Josef Kandlbinder (West Germany)

=== Group 3 ===
Pos	Team	Pld	W	D	L	GF	GA	GD	Pts	Qualification
1	Denmark	3	3	0	0	8	4	+4	6	Advanced to knockout stage
2	Argentina	3	2	0	1	6	4	+2	4	
3	Poland	3	1	0	2	7	5	+2	2	
4	Tunisia	3	0	0	3	3	11	−8	0	

Source: RSSSF
26 August 1960
16:00

Poland	6–1	Tunisia
Pohl 7', 40', 42', 84', 89'; Hachorek 67'	Report	Kerrit 3'

Stadio Flaminio, Rome
Attendance: 5,873
Referee: Concetto Lo Bello (Italy)
26 August 1960
21:00

Denmark	3–2	Argentina
Sørensen 31'; H. Nielsen 46', 85'	Report	Oleniak 20'; Bilardo 88'

Stadio Flaminio, Rome
Attendance: 7,154
Referee: Francesco Liverani (Italy)

29 August 1960
21:00

Tunisia	1–2	Argentina
Kerrit 25'	Report	Oleniak 15', 82'

Stadio Adriatico, Pescara
Referee: István Zsolt (Hungary)
29 August 1960
21:00

Denmark	2–1	Poland
H. Nielsen 15'; Pedersen 86'	Report	Gadecki 62'

Stadio di Ardenza, Livorno
Attendance: 5,574
Referee: Concetto Lo Bello (Italy)

1 September 1960
21:00

Denmark	3–1	Tunisia
F. Nielsen 24'; H. Nielsen 27', 88'	Report	Cherif 48'

Stadio Tommaso Fattori, L'Aquila
Attendance: 1,204
Referee: Giulio Campanati (Italy)
1 September 1960
21:00

Argentina	2–0	Poland
Oleniak 38'; Pérez 55'	Report

Stadio San Paolo, Naples
Referee: Sulhi Garan (Turkey)

=== Group 4 ===
Pos	Team	Pld	W	D	L	GF	GA	GD	Pts	Qualification
1	Hungary	3	3	0	0	15	3	+12	6	Advanced to knockout stage
2	France	3	1	1	1	3	9	−6	3	
3	Peru	3	1	0	2	6	9	−3	2	
4	India	3	0	1	2	3	6	−3	1	

Source: RSSSF
26 August 1960
16:00

Hungary	2–1	India
Göröcs 23'; Albert 56'	Report	Balaram 79'

Stadio Tommaso Fattori, L'Aquila
Referee: Bahri Ben Said (Tunisia)
26 August 1960
21:00

France	2–1	Peru
Giamarchi 67'; Quédec 90'	Report	Uribe 1'

Stadio Comunale, Florence
Referee: Emil Erlich (Yugoslavia)

29 August 1960
21:00

France	1–1	India
Coinçon 82'	Report	Banerjee 71'

Stadio Olimpico Comunale, Grosseto
Referee: Raymond Morgan (Canada)
29 August 1960
21:00

Hungary	6–2	Peru
Albert 17', 87'; Rákosi 27'; Göröcs 33'; Dunai 46', 63'	Report	Ramírez 25', 79'

Stadio San Paolo, Naples
Referee: Piero Bonetto (Italy)

1 September 1960
16:00

Hungary	7–0	France
Albert 12', 85'; Göröcs 34', 59', 77'; Dunai 41', 79'	Report

Stadio Flaminio, Rome
Referee: Vincenzo Orlandini (Italy)
1 September 1960
21:00

Peru	3–1	India
Nieri 27', 53'; Iwasaki 85'	Report	Balaram 88'

Stadio Adriatico – Giovanni Cornacchia, Pescara
Referee: Hussein Imam (United Arab Republic)

== Knockout stage ==
=== Bracket ===
Semi-finals
5 September – Naples
Italy	1
Yugoslavia	1
5 September – Rome
Denmark	2
Hungary	0

Gold medal match
10 September – Rome
Yugoslavia	3
Denmark	1
Bronze medal match
9 September – Rome
Hungary	2
Italy	1

=== Semi-finals ===
5 September 1960
18:00

Italy	1–1 (a.e.t.)	Yugoslavia
Tumburus 109'	Report	Galić 107'

Stadio San Paolo, Naples
Attendance: 16,568
Referee: Josef Kandlbinder (West Germany)

Yugoslavia declared winners by lot.

6 September 1960
21:00

Denmark	2–0	Hungary
H. Nielsen 19'; Enoksen 81'	Report

Stadio Flaminio, Rome
Attendance: 14,237
Referee: Reginald Leafe (Great Britain)

=== Bronze medal match ===
9 September 1960
21:00

Hungary	2–1	Italy
Orosz 32'; Dunai 69'	Report	Tomeazzi 84'

Stadio Flaminio, Rome
Referee: Reginald Leafe (Great Britain)

=== Gold medal match ===
10 September 1960
21:00

Yugoslavia	3–1	Denmark
Galić 1'; Matuš 11'; Kostić 69'	Report	F. Nielsen 90'

Stadio Flaminio, Rome
Attendance: 23,042
Referee: Concetto Lo Bello (Italy)

== Goalscorers ==
With seven goals, Milan Galić of Yugoslavia is the top scorer in the tournament. In total, 120 goals were scored by 56 different players, with only one of them credited as own goal.

7 goals

- (Socialist Federal Republic of Yugoslavia) Milan Galić (Yugoslavia)

6 goals

- (Socialist Federal Republic of Yugoslavia) Bora Kostić (Yugoslavia)

5 goals

- Harald Nielsen (Denmark)
- Flórián Albert (Hungary)
- János Dunai (Hungary)
- János Göröcs (Hungary)
- Ernest Pohl (Poland)

4 goals

- Juan Carlos Oleniak (Argentina)
- Gérson (Brazil)
- (United Kingdom) Bobby Brown (Great Britain)
- Giorgio Rossano (Italy)

3 goals

- Todor Diev (Bulgaria)
- Gianni Rivera (Italy)

2 goals

- China (Brazil)
- Roberto Dias (Brazil)
- Spiro Debarski (Bulgaria)
- Flemming Nielsen (Denmark)
- (United Kingdom) Paddy Hasty (Great Britain)
- (United Kingdom) Jim Lewis (Great Britain)
- Tulsidas Balaram (India)
- Ugo Tomeazzi (Italy)
- Nicolas Nieri (Peru)
- Alberto Ramírez (Peru)
- (Taiwan) Chuk Yin Yiu (Republic of China)
- Brahim Kerrit (Tunisia)
- Raafat Attia (United Arab Republic)
- Samir Qotb (United Arab Republic)
- (Socialist Federal Republic of Yugoslavia) Tomislav Knez (Yugoslavia)

1 goal

- Carlos Bilardo (Argentina)
- Raúl Adolfo Pérez (Argentina)
- Waldir (Brazil)
- Wanderley (Brazil)
- Hristo Hristov (Bulgaria)
- Georgi Naidenov Yordanov (Bulgaria)
- Henning Enoksen (Denmark)
- Poul Pedersen (Denmark)
- Jørn Sørensen (Denmark)
- Gérard Coinçon (France)
- André Giamarchi (France)
- Yvon Quédec (France)
- Pál Orosz (Hungary)
- Gyula Rákosi (Hungary)
- Pradip Kumar Banerjee (India)
- Giovanni Fanello (Italy)
- Paride Tumburus (Italy)
- Tomás Iwasaki (Peru)
- Ángel Uribe (Peru)
- Zygmunt Gadecki (Poland)
- Stanisław Hachorek (Poland)
- (Taiwan) Mok Chun-wah (Republic of China)
- Moncef Chérif (Tunisia)
- Uğur Köken (Turkey)
- Bilge Tahran (Turkey)
- İbrahim Yalçınkaya (Turkey)
- (Socialist Federal Republic of Yugoslavia) Željko Matuš (Yugoslavia)

Own goals

- El Sayed Rifai (United Arab Republic; playing against Yugoslavia)

== Final ranking ==
Pos	Team	Pld	W	D	L	GF	GA	GD	Pts
1	Yugoslavia	5	3	2	0	17	6	+11	8
2	Denmark	5	4	0	1	11	7	+4	8
3	Hungary	5	4	0	1	17	6	+11	8
4	Italy	5	2	2	1	11	7	+4	6
5	Bulgaria	3	2	1	0	8	3	+5	5
6	Brazil	3	2	0	1	10	6	+4	4
7	Argentina	3	2	0	1	6	4	+2	4
8	Great Britain	3	1	1	1	8	8	0	3
9	France	3	1	1	1	3	9	−6	3
10	Poland	3	1	0	2	7	5	+2	2
11	Peru	3	1	0	2	6	9	−3	2
12	United Arab Republic	3	0	1	2	4	11	−7	1
13	India	3	0	1	2	3	6	−3	1
14	Turkey	3	0	1	2	3	10	−7	1
15	Tunisia	3	0	0	3	3	11	−8	0
16	Formosa	3	0	0	3	3	12	−9	0

Source: FIFA
