= Gadecki =

Gadecki or Gądecki (feminine form: Gadecka or Gądecka) is a Polish surname. Notable people with the surname include:

- Olivia Gadecki (born 2002), Australian tennis player
- Sabina Gadecki (born 1983), American actress and model
- Stanisław Gądecki (born 1949), Polish Catholic bishop
- Zygmunt Gadecki (1938–2000), Polish footballer
