= Edward Szymkowiak =

Polish footballer

Personal information
- Full name: Edward Józef Szymkowiak
- Date of birth: 13 February 1932
- Place of birth: Szopienice, Poland
- Date of death: 28 January 1990 (aged 57)
- Place of death: Bytom, Poland
- Height: 1.78 m (5 ft 10 in)
- Position: Goalkeeper

Senior career*
Years	Team	Apps	(Gls)
1944	TuS Bogucice		
1945–1949	KS 22 Mała Dąbrówka		
1950–1952	Ruch Chorzów	24	(0)
1952	Garnizonowy WKS Bielsko		
1953–1956	Legia Warsaw	85	(0)
1957–1969	Polonia Bytom	245	(0)

International career
1952–1965	Poland	53	(0)
- * Club domestic league appearances and goals

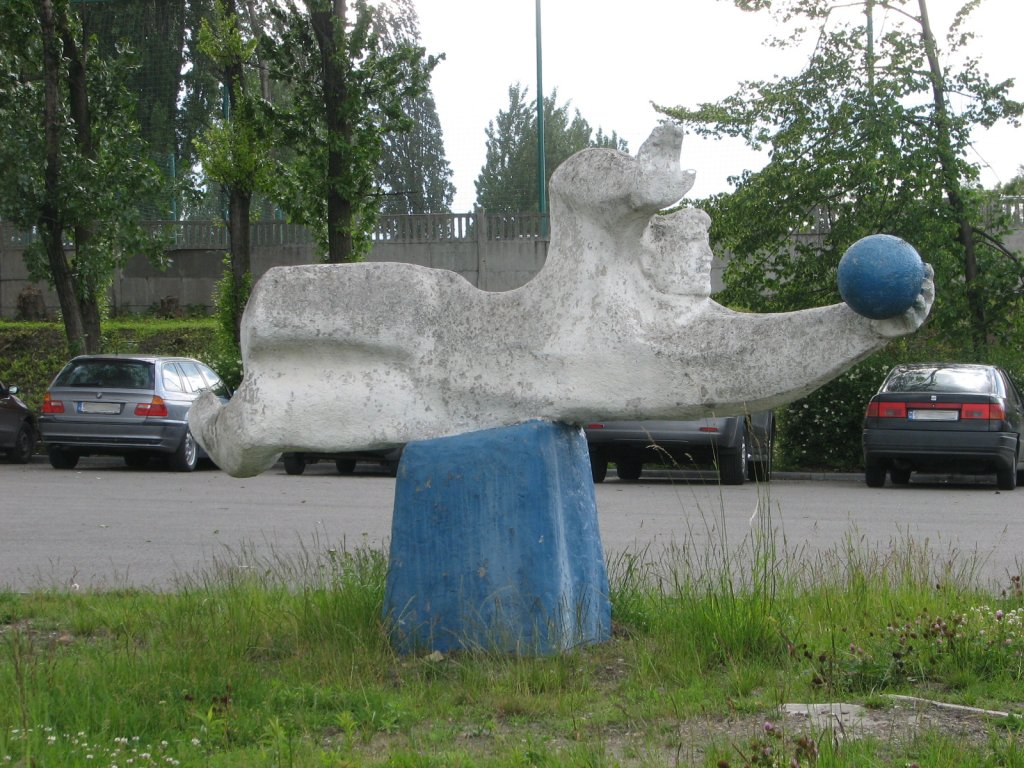
Edward Szymkowiak Monument at the entrance to the Polonia Bytom Stadium.

Edward Józef Szymkowiak (13 February 1932 – 28 January 1990) was a Polish footballer who played as a goalkeeper.

== Career ==
He played for such a clubs like Ruch Chorzów and Legia Warsaw, but most of his career he spent in Polonia Bytom. He is one of the legends of that club. The stadium of Polonia Bytom is called by his name. Szymkowiak participated in the Olympic Games in Helsinki and Rome. He played in one of the biggest victories of Polish football, a game against the USSR national football team in 1957.

== Career statistics ==
=== International ===
Appearances, conceded goals and clean sheets by national team
National team	Year	Apps	Conceded Goals	Clean Sheets
Poland	1952	5	9	2
Poland	1953	3	5	0
Poland	1954	0	0	0
Poland	1955	3	4	0
Poland	1956	6	9	2
Poland	1957	5	7	0
Poland	1958	6	13	0
Poland	1959	3	6	0
Poland	1960	4	3	2
Poland	1961	5	5	2
Poland	1962	6	10	1
Poland	1963	0	0	0
Poland	1964	3	6	0
Poland	1965	4	3	2
Total		53	80	11

== Honours ==
Ruch Chorzów

- Ekstraklasa: 1952
- Polish Cup: 1950–51

Legia Warsaw

- Ekstraklasa: 1955, 1956
- Polish Cup: 1954–55, 1955–6

Polonia Bytom

- Ekstraklasa: 1962
- UEFA Intertoto Cup: 1964–65
- International Soccer League: 1965
