= Ginel =

Ginel, Ginell, or Ginnell may refer to:

- Alícia Homs Ginel (born 1993), Spanish politician
- Salvador Ginel (born 1938), Argentine former footballer
- Laurence Ginnell (1854–1923), Irish nationalist politician
- Pat Ginnell (1937–2003), Canadian professional ice hockey player

== See also ==
- Ginnel, or alley
