= 1958 Ekstraklasa =

32nd season of top-tier football league in Poland

Liga
- Season: 1958
- Champions: ŁKS Łódź (1st title)
- Relegated: Odra Opole; Zagłębie Sosnowiec
- Top goalscorer: Władysław Soporek (19 goals)

Statistics of Ekstraklasa for the 1958 season.

== Overview ==
12 teams competed in the 1958 season. ŁKS Łódź won the championship.

== League table ==
Pos	Team	Pld	W	D	L	GF	GA	GD	Pts	Qualification or relegation
1	ŁKS Łódź (C)	22	13	6	3	61	24	+37	32	
2	Polonia Bytom	22	12	7	3	49	21	+28	31	Qualification for the European Cup preliminary round
3	Górnik Zabrze	22	10	7	5	57	31	+26	27	
4	Ruch Chorzów	22	11	5	6	38	28	+10	27	
5	Gwardia Warsaw	22	12	3	7	42	39	+3	27	
6	Legia Warsaw	22	9	2	11	40	40	0	20	
7	Wisła Kraków	23	8	4	11	39	50	−11	20	
8	Lechia Gdańsk	22	8	3	11	33	44	−11	19	
9	Polonia Bydgoszcz	22	7	5	10	31	58	−27	19	
10	KS Cracovia	22	8	2	12	37	46	−9	18	
11	Odra Opole (R)	22	7	4	11	23	36	−13	18	Relegated to II liga
12	Zagłębie Sosnowiec (R)	22	1	4	17	22	55	−33	6	Relegated to II liga

Source: 90minut.pl (in Polish)
(C) Champions; (R) Relegated

== Results ==
Home \ Away	CRA	GÓR	GWA	LGD	LEG	ŁKS	OOP	BYG	BYT	RUC	WIS	ZSO
Cracovia		1–5	5–0	2–1	2–1	2–1	5–1	6–0	0–2	0–5	1–1	2–2
Górnik Zabrze	5–1		3–4	2–2	4–0	0–0	6–0	8–0	3–1	2–1	3–4	1–0
Gwardia Warsaw	3–1	2–1		5–1	5–1	0–5	0–0	0–1	4–2	1–1	4–2	2–0
Lechia Gdańsk	3–0	1–2	1–2		3–1	2–2	2–0	5–1	1–1	2–1	2–0	1–0
Legia Warsaw	2–1	3–2	1–2	4–0		3–0	2–1	5–0	1–2	5–2	4–0	1–1
ŁKS Łódź	3–0	4–1	2–1	4–0	3–0		1–0	4–2	2–2	2–3	5–0	7–0
Odra Opole	2–0	1–1	0–1	3–2	0–0	1–4		2–0	0–2	1–1	2–1	2–1
Polonia Bydgoszcz	2–1	0–0	2–2	4–1	2–1	3–3	0–4		1–1	1–1	2–1	3–1
Polonia Bytom	3–0	1–1	4–1	6–0	2–0	1–1	2–0	3–0		0–0	5–1	2–0
Ruch Chorzów	2–1	0–0	1–0	0–2	5–2	1–2	2–1	4–2	2–1		2–0	3–0
Wisła Kraków	1–2	3–3	3–0	2–1	2–1	1–1	3–1	4–2	1–4	3–0		4–3
Zagłębie Sosnowiec	1–4	2–4	2–3	2–0	1–2	1–5	0–1	1–3	2–2	0–1	2–2	

Source: 90minut.pl (in Polish)
Legend: Blue = home team win; Yellow = draw; Red = away team win.

== Top goalscorers ==
Rank	Player	Club	Goals
1	(Poland) Władysław Soporek	ŁKS Łódź	19
2	(Poland) Marian Norkowski	Polonia Bydgoszcz	18
3	(Poland) Stanisław Adamczyk	Wisła Kraków	17
4	(Poland) Edward Jankowski	Górnik Zabrze	16
5	(Poland) Lucjan Brychczy	Legia Warsaw	15
6	(Poland) Stanisław Hachorek	Gwardia Warszawa	14
6	(Poland) Eugeniusz Lerch	Ruch Chorzów	14
8	(Poland) Henryk Kempny	Polonia Bytom	13
8	(Poland) Herbert Manowski	Cracovia	13

== Attendances ==
No.	Club	Average
1	ŁKS	28,545
2	Górnik Zabrze	22,364
3	Ruch Chorzów	22,182
4	Lechia Gdańsk	19,818
5	Cracovia	18,818
6	Legia Warszawa	18,000
7	Polonia Bytom	16,364
8	Wisła Kraków	15,364
9	Polonia Bydgoszcz	13,091
10	Zagłębie Sosnowiec	11,818
11	Gwardia Warszawa	11,182
12	Odra Opole	6,727
