= Hubert Pala =

Polish footballer (1933–2007)

Personal information
- Full name: Hubert Stefan Pala
- Date of birth: 4 September 1933
- Place of birth: Chorzów, Poland
- Date of death: 5 September 2007 (aged 74)
- Place of death: Hamm, Germany
- Height: 1.73 m (5 ft 8 in)
- Positions: Left winger; defender

Youth career
- –1950: Azoty Chorzów

Senior career*
Years	Team	Apps	(Gls)
1950–1953	Ruch Chorzów		
1953–1955	Legia Warsaw		
1955–1956	Wawel Kraków		
1956–1963	Ruch Chorzów		
1963–1964	Raków Częstochowa		
1965	Błękitni Kielce		

International career
1960	Poland	3	(0)

Managerial career
- 1969: Ruch Chorzów
- 1971: Ruch Chorzów
- * Club domestic league appearances and goals

Hubert Stefan Pala (4 September 1933 – 5 September 2007) was a Polish former footballer.

He represented Poland at the 1960 Summer Olympics.

== Honours ==
Ruch Chorzów

- Ekstraklasa: 1953, 1960
