= Hamadi Dhaou =

Tunisian footballer

Personal information
- Date of birth: 10 January 1940 (age 86)
- Place of birth: Tunis, Tunisia

International career
Years	Team	Apps	(Gls)
- Tunisia

Hamadi Dhaou (born 10 January 1940) is a Tunisian footballer. He competed in the men's tournament at the 1960 Summer Olympics.
