= Abderrahman Ben Azzedine =

Tunisian footballer (1933–2026)

Personal information
- Date of birth: 25 December 1933
- Place of birth: Tunis, French protectorate of Tunisia
- Date of death: 20 November 2026 (aged 92)
- Height: 1.65 m (5 ft 5 in)
- Position: Forward

Senior career*
Years	Team	Apps	(Gls)
- ES Tunis

International career
- Tunisia
- * Club domestic league appearances and goals

Abderrahman Ben Azzedine (Arabic: عبد الرحمن بن عز الدين; 25 December 1933 – 20 November 2026) was a Tunisian footballer who played as a forward for ES Tunis. He competed in the men's tournament at the 1960 Summer Olympics.
