= Jan Schmidt (footballer) =

Polish footballer

Personal information
- Date of birth: 2 March 1937
- Place of birth: Chorzów, Poland
- Date of death: 19 February 2023 (aged 85)
- Place of death: Chorzów, Poland
- Height: 1.75 m (5 ft 9 in)
- Position: Forward

Youth career
- 1949–1951: KS Kościuszko

Senior career*
Years	Team	Apps	(Gls)
1951–1954	AKS Chorzów		
1954–1957	Start Chorzów		
1958	Śląsk Wrocław		
1958–1959	Legia Warsaw	7	(4)
1960–1962	Ruch Chorzów	41	(25)

International career
1961	Poland	1	(1)
- * Club domestic league appearances and goals

Jan Schmidt (2 March 1937 – 19 February 2023) was a Polish footballer who played as a forward. He made one appearance for the Poland national team in 1961.

== Honours ==
Ruch Chorzów

- Ekstraklasa: 1960
