= Henryk Grzybowski =

Polish footballer (1934–2012)

Personal information
- Full name: Henryk Zbigniew Grzybowski
- Date of birth: 17 July 1934
- Place of birth: Warsaw, Poland
- Date of death: 17 November 2012 (aged 78)
- Place of death: Warsaw, Poland
- Height: 1.76 m (5 ft 9 in)
- Position: Defender

Senior career*
Years	Team	Apps	(Gls)
1949–1967	Legia Warsaw	198	(1)

International career
1957–1960	Poland	10	(0)
- * Club domestic league appearances and goals

Henryk Zbigniew Grzybowski (17 July 1934 – 17 November 2012) was a Polish footballer who played as a defender. He was part of Poland's squad at the 1960 Summer Olympics, but he did not play in any matches.

== Honours ==
Legia Warsaw

- Ekstraklasa: 1955, 1956
- Polish Cup: 1955–56, 1963–64, 1965–66
