= Abdel Majid Naji =

Tunisian footballer

Personal information
- Date of birth: 14 October 1936 (age 90)
- Place of birth: Tunis, Tunisia
- Position: Forward

International career
Years	Team	Apps	(Gls)
- Tunisia

Abdel Majid Salah Naji (born 14 October 1936) is a Tunisian former footballer. He competed in the men's tournament at the 1960 Summer Olympics.
