= Khalled Loualid =

Tunisian footballer

Personal information
- Date of birth: 3 March 1941 (age 85)
- Place of birth: Ouled Fraji, Tunisia
- Position: Goalkeeper

International career
Years	Team	Apps	(Gls)
- Tunisia

Khalled Loualid (born 3 March 1941) is a Tunisian former footballer. He competed in the men's tournament at the 1960 Summer Olympics.
