= 1960 Ekstraklasa =

34th season of top-tier football league in Poland

Liga
- Season: 1960
- Champions: Ruch Chorzów (9th title)
- Relegated: Gwardia Warsaw; Pogoń Szczecin
- Top goalscorer: Marian Norkowski (17 goals)

Statistics of Ekstraklasa for the 1960 season.

== Overview ==
It was contested by 12 teams, and Ruch Chorzów won the championship.

== League table ==
| Pos | Team | Pld | W | D | L | GF | GA | GD | Pts | Qualification or relegation |
|---|---|---|---|---|---|---|---|---|---|---|
| 1 | Ruch Chorzów (C) | 22 | 12 | 6 | 4 | 41 | 29 | +12 | 30 | |
| 2 | Legia Warsaw | 22 | 12 | 5 | 5 | 40 | 26 | +14 | 29 | Qualification for the European Cup preliminary round |
| 3 | Górnik Zabrze | 22 | 12 | 4 | 6 | 52 | 32 | +20 | 28 | |
| 4 | Odra Opole | 22 | 10 | 7 | 5 | 43 | 28 | +15 | 27 | |
| 5 | Polonia Bydgoszcz | 22 | 9 | 4 | 9 | 30 | 43 | −13 | 22 | |
| 6 | Polonia Bytom | 22 | 7 | 7 | 8 | 42 | 36 | +6 | 21 | |
| 7 | Zagłębie Sosnowiec | 22 | 9 | 3 | 10 | 30 | 27 | +3 | 21 | |
| 8 | Wisła Kraków | 22 | 7 | 6 | 9 | 29 | 38 | −9 | 20 | |
| 9 | Lechia Gdańsk | 22 | 7 | 4 | 11 | 25 | 35 | −10 | 18 | |
| 10 | ŁKS Łódź | 22 | 5 | 8 | 9 | 28 | 36 | −8 | 18 | |
| 11 | Gwardia Warsaw (R) | 22 | 6 | 5 | 11 | 31 | 37 | −6 | 17 | Relegated to II liga |
| 12 | Pogoń Szczecin (R) | 22 | 3 | 7 | 12 | 25 | 53 | −28 | 13 | Relegated to II liga |

Source: 90minut.pl (in Polish)
(C) Champions; (R) Relegated

== Results ==
| Home \ Away | GÓR | GWA | LGD | LEG | ŁKS | OOP | POG | BYG | BYT | RUC | ZSO | WIS |
|---|---|---|---|---|---|---|---|---|---|---|---|---|
| Górnik Zabrze | | 5–2 | 1–0 | 2–0 | 2–0 | 1–2 | 4–0 | 7–0 | 2–1 | 4–2 | 0–0 | 4–0 |
| Gwardia Warsaw | 1–3 | | 0–1 | 4–1 | 0–0 | 2–0 | 1–1 | 1–1 | 3–3 | 1–0 | 3–0 | 0–2 |
| Lechia Gdańsk | 3–1 | 2–0 | | 0–1 | 2–2 | 1–3 | 0–0 | 0–1 | 3–2 | 2–0 | 3–2 | 2–2 |
| Legia Warsaw | 4–2 | 3–2 | 4–0 | | 2–2 | 1–1 | 3–1 | 2–1 | 4–1 | 1–2 | 1–0 | 1–1 |
| ŁKS Łódź | 1–3 | 3–2 | 1–1 | 0–0 | | 2–1 | 1–2 | 6–2 | 1–1 | 2–2 | 1–3 | 2–1 |
| Odra Opole | 4–1 | 1–0 | 3–1 | 0–0 | 1–1 | | 5–1 | 2–2 | 1–1 | 5–2 | 1–0 | 4–0 |
| Pogoń Szczecin | 0–0 | 2–5 | 1–3 | 1–4 | 2–0 | 0–0 | | 4–1 | 2–2 | 2–2 | 2–4 | 0–5 |
| Polonia Bydgoszcz | 4–2 | 5–2 | 3–1 | 0–1 | 1–0 | 2–1 | 2–0 | | 2–0 | 1–1 | 2–1 | 0–0 |
| Polonia Bytom | 3–0 | 0–1 | 2–1 | 1–4 | 1–2 | 3–3 | 5–1 | 4–0 | | 2–2 | 1–0 | 2–2 |
| Ruch Chorzów | 2–2 | 2–0 | 2–1 | 3–1 | 3–0 | 4–1 | 2–1 | 2–0 | 1–0 | | 2–0 | 2–1 |
| Zagłębie Sosnowiec | 2–2 | 2–1 | 2–1 | 0–1 | 2–0 | 2–1 | 2–0 | 4–0 | 1–2 | 1–1 | | 1–2 |
| Wisła Kraków | 1–4 | 0–0 | 2–1 | 2–1 | 2–1 | 1–3 | 2–2 | 2–0 | 0–5 | 1–2 | 0–1 | |

Source: 90minut.pl (in Polish)
Legend: Blue = home team win; Yellow = draw; Red = away team win.

== Top goalscorers ==
| Rank | Player | Club | Goals |
|---|---|---|---|
| 1 | (Poland) Marian Norkowski | Polonia Bydgoszcz | 17 |
| 2 | (Poland) Engelbert Jarek | Odra Opole | 15 |
| 2 | (Poland) Jan Liberda | Polonia Bytom | 15 |
| 2 | (Poland) Erwin Wilczek | Górnik Zabrze | 15 |
| 5 | (Poland) Czesław Nowicki | Lechia Gdańsk | 14 |
| 6 | (Poland) Lucjan Brychczy | Legia Warsaw | 13 |
| 7 | (Poland) Jan Schmidt | Ruch Chorzów | 12 |
| 8 | (Poland) Stanisław Hachorek | Gwardia Warszawa | 11 |
| 8 | (Poland) Edward Jankowski | Górnik Zabrze | 11 |

== Attendances ==
| # | Club | Average |
|---|---|---|
| 1 | Wisła Kraków | 19,273 |
| 2 | ŁKS | 19,091 |
| 3 | Pogoń Szczecin | 18,818 |
| 4 | Ruch Chorzów | 18,636 |
| 5 | Górnik Zabrze | 18,545 |
| 6 | Zagłębie Sosnowiec | 16,545 |
| 7 | Legia Warszawa | 16,273 |
| 8 | Lechia Gdańsk | 12,545 |
| 9 | Polonia Bytom | 11,864 |
| 10 | Gwardia Warszawa | 11,545 |
| 11 | Polonia Bydgoszcz | 11,273 |
| 12 | Odra Opole | 11,273 |
