= Henryk Szczepański =

Polish footballer (1933–2015)

Personal information
- Date of birth: 7 October 1933
- Place of birth: Wejherowo, Poland
- Date of death: 30 January 2015 (aged 81)
- Place of death: Warsaw, Poland
- Height: 1.73 m (5 ft 8 in)
- Position: Defender

Senior career*
Years	Team	Apps	(Gls)
1954–1956	Polonia Bydgoszcz	58	(2)
1957–1960	ŁKS Łódź	83	(2)
1961–1968	Odra Opole	134	(2)
Total		275	(6)

International career
1957–1965	Poland	45	(0)

Managerial career
- 1968–1969: Gwardia Warsaw
- 1974–1975: OKS OZOS Olsztyn
- 1975: Motor Lublin
- 1976–1977: Gwardia Warsaw
- 1981–1982: Gwardia Warsaw
- 1986–1987: Gwardia Warsaw
- 1996: Gwardia Warsaw
- Olimpia Poznań
- Gwardia Koszalin
- Okęcie Warsaw
- * Club domestic league appearances and goals

Henryk Szczepański (7 October 1933 – 30 January 2015) was a Polish footballer who played as a defender. He competed in the 1960 Summer Olympics.

== Club career ==
Henryk Szczepański started his football career in the works club Stal Bydgoszcz and Polonia Bydgoszcz. From 1957 to 1960, he was a footballer for ŁKS Łódź, with whom he won the Polish Cup in 1957 and the following year the national championship. In 1960, together with Roman Korynt, he won the "Golden Shoe" in the "Katowice Sport" plebiscite. In 1961, he moved to Odra Opole, with whom he finished the 1963–64 season in 3rd place (the highest place in Odra's history). He played for the club until 1967.

== International career ==
He made his debut for Poland on 29 September 1957 in Sofia in a 1–1 friendly draw with Bulgaria. He competed at the 1960 Summer Olympics in Rome. Henryk Szczepański's last match for the national team took place on 1 November 1965 in Rome, in a 1–6 loss to Italy in the 1966 FIFA World Cup qualifiers. In total, he played 45 official matches for the national team, of which 24 games where he wore the captain's armband.

== Coaching career ==
After his football career ended, he worked as a coach, in Gwardia Warsaw, Olimpia Poznań, Motor Lublin, OKS OZOS Olsztyn, Gwardia Koszalin and Okęcie Warsaw.

== Honours ==
ŁKS Łódź

- Ekstraklasa: 1958
- Polish Cup: 1956–57
