= Jerzy Woźniak =

Polish footballer

Personal information
- Full name: Jerzy Jan Woźniak
- Date of birth: 27 December 1932
- Place of birth: Rembertów, Poland
- Date of death: 9 January 2011 (aged 78)
- Place of death: Warsaw, Poland
- Height: 1.72 m (5 ft 8 in)
- Position: Defender

Senior career*
Years	Team	Apps	(Gls)
1949–1952	Marymont Warsaw		
1953	Lotnik Warsaw		
1954–1967	Legia Warsaw		
1968–1972	RKS Błonie		

International career
1955–1962	Poland	35	(0)
- * Club domestic league appearances and goals

Jerzy Jan Woźniak (27 December 1932 – 9 January 2011) was a Polish footballer who played as a defender. Woźniak spent 13 seasons at Legia Warsaw, and also earned 35 caps for the Poland national team. He was also part of Poland's squad at the 1960 Summer Olympics.

== Honours ==
Legia Warsaw

- Ekstraklasa: 1955, 1956
- Polish Cup: 1954–55, 1955–56, 1965–66
