= Edward Szymkowiak Stadium =

Football stadium

Coordinates: 50°21′27.21″N 18°53′55.38″E

- Stadion im. Edwarda Szymkowiaka
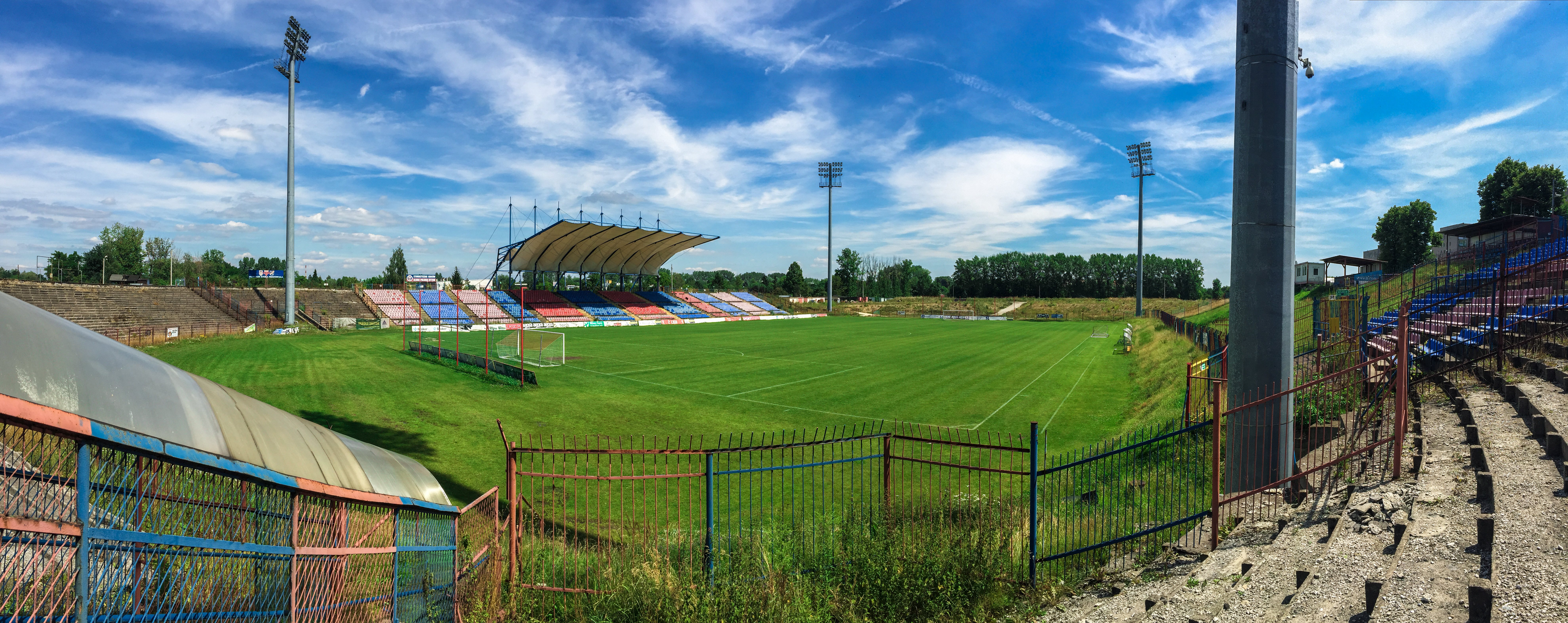

- Location within Silesian Voivodeship
- Former names: Hindenburg-Kampfbahn (1929–1945)
- Address: ul. Olimpijska 2; 41-902 Bytom; Poland
- Capacity: 5500
- Surface: grass, heated
- Field size: 105 m x 78 m

Construction
- Built: 1929; 97 years ago
- Opened: 1929; 97 years ago
- Demolished: 2023; 3 years ago

Tenants
- Polonia Bytom

Stadion im. Edwarda Szymkowiaka (English: Edward Szymkowiak Stadium) was a multi-use stadium in Bytom, Poland. Until 1945 former name of stadium was Hindenburg Stadium. It is currently used mostly for football matches and served as the home of Polonia Bytom until 2023. The stadium has a capacity of 5,500 people. It was opened in 1929. On 16 August 1942, the venue hosted an official football match between Germany and Romania, which ended 7–0 for Germany.

The venue is named after Edward Szymkowiak, legendary Polonia Bytom and Poland national team goalkeeper. The stadium was demolished in 2023.
