= Marceli Strzykalski =

Polish footballer

Personal information
- Date of birth: 19 February 1931
- Place of birth: Nowy Bytom, Poland
- Date of death: 6 April 2014 (aged 83)
- Place of death: Würselen, Germany
- Height: 1.73 m (5 ft 8 in)
- Position: Midfielder

Senior career*
Years	Team	Apps	(Gls)
–1947	Pogoń Nowy Bytom		
1948–1949	Bobrek Karb Bytom		
1950–1951	Zagłębie Sosnowiec		
1951–1952	GWKS Kielce		
1952–1953	Wawel Kraków		
1954	Ślęza Wrocław		
1954–1963	Legia Warsaw	162	(15)
1964	KS Warszawianka		

International career
1949	Poland U19	1	(0)
1952–1961	Poland	17	(0)

Managerial career
- 1968: GKS Katowice
- 1970: GKS Katowice
- 1972–1973: GKS Katowice
- * Club domestic league appearances and goals

Marceli Konrad Strzykalski (19 February 1931 – 6 April 2014) was a Polish footballer who played as a midfielder.

He competed in the 1960 Summer Olympics.

== Honours ==
Legia Warsaw

- Ekstraklasa: 1955, 1956
- Polish Cup: 1954–55, 1955–56
