= Ugo Tomeazzi =

Italian footballer

Personal information
- Date of birth: 12 December 1940 (age 85)
- Place of birth: Bomporto, Italy
- Position: Midfielder

International career
Years	Team	Apps	(Gls)
- Italy

Ugo Tomeazzi (born 24 December 1940) is an Italian footballer. A midfielder, he competed in the men's tournament at the 1960 Summer Olympics.
