= Marwell Periotti =

Argentine footballer

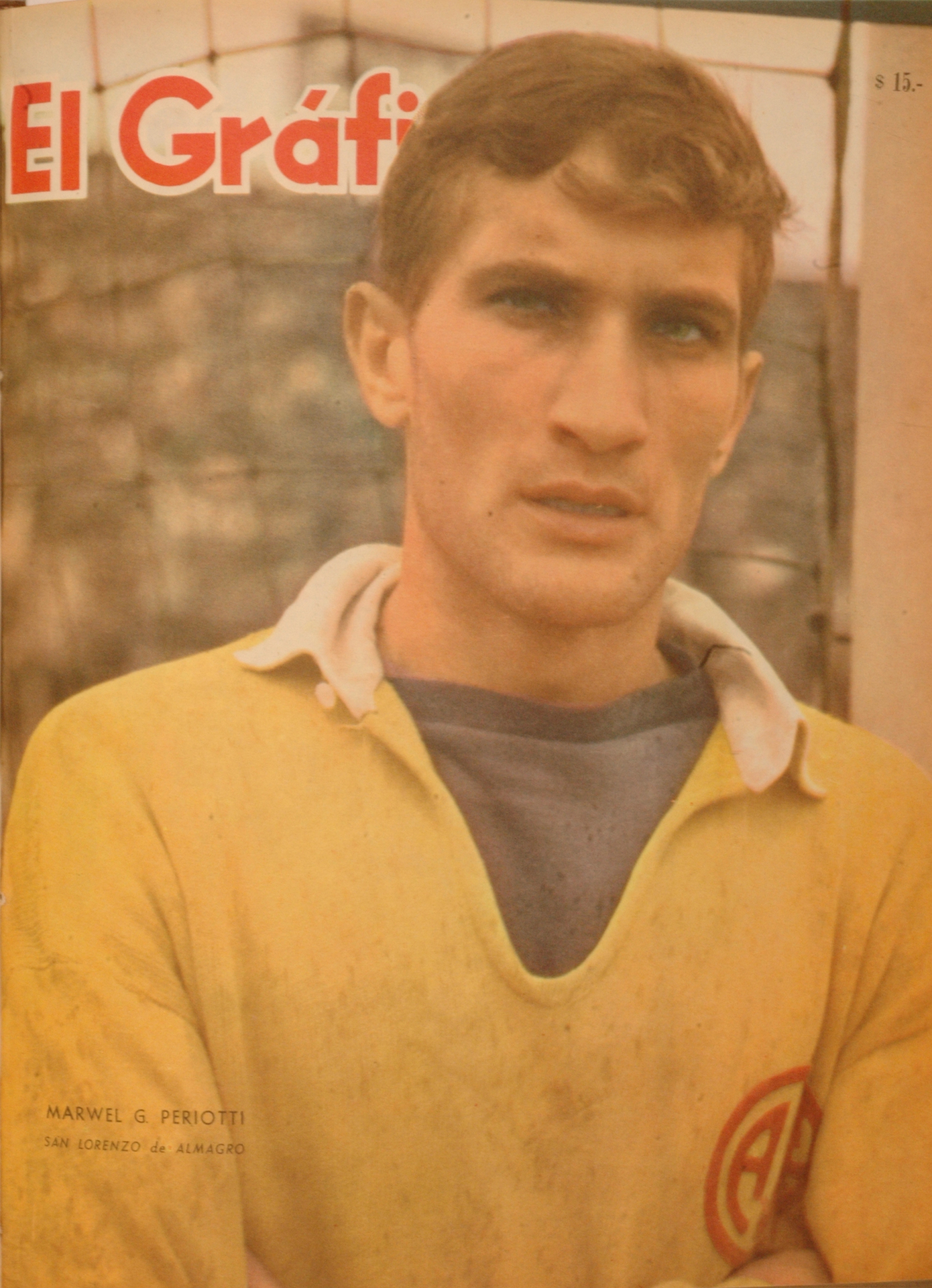

Personal information
- Date of birth: 25 May 1939
- Date of death: 27 October 2004 (aged 65)
- Position: Goalkeeper

Senior career*
Years	Team	Apps	(Gls)
- San Lorenzo
- * Club domestic league appearances and goals

Marwell Periotti (25 May 1939 – 27 October 2004) was an Argentine footballer who competed in the 1960 Summer Olympics.
