= Stanisław Fołtyn =

Polish footballer

Personal information
- Full name: Stanisław Jakub Fołtyn
- Date of birth: 25 July 1936
- Place of birth: Warsaw, Poland
- Date of death: 8 March 2003 (aged 66)
- Place of death: Warsaw, Poland
- Height: 1.77 m (5 ft 10 in)
- Position: Goalkeeper

Senior career*
Years	Team	Apps	(Gls)
1953–1969	Legia Warsaw	145	(0)
1969–1970	Wisła Chicago		
1970–1972	Ursus Warsaw		

International career
1960–1964	Poland	4	(0)
- * Club domestic league appearances and goals

Stanisław Jakub Fołtyn (25 July 1936 – 8 March 2003) was a Polish footballer who played as a goalkeeper. He was part of Poland's squad at the 1960 Summer Olympics, but he did not play in any matches.

== Honours ==
Legia Warsaw

- Polish Cup: 1963–64, 1965–66
