= 1956 Ekstraklasa =

30th season of top-tier football league in Poland

Liga
- Season: 1956
- Champions: Legia Warsaw (2nd title)
- Relegated: Polonia Bydgoszcz; Garbarnia Kraków
- Top goalscorer: Henryk Kempny (21 goals)

Statistics of Ekstraklasa for the 1956 season.

== Overview ==
12 teams competed in the league and the championship was won by Legia Warsaw.

== League table ==
Pos	Team	Pld	W	D	L	GF	GA	GD	Pts	Qualification or relegation
1	CWKS Warsaw (C)	22	15	4	3	65	17	+48	34	Qualification for the European Cup preliminary round
2	Ruch Chorzów	22	11	7	4	35	23	+12	29	
3	Lechia Gdańsk	22	10	7	5	25	21	+4	27	
4	ŁKS Łódź	22	10	6	6	38	26	+12	26	
5	Wisła Kraków	22	9	5	8	38	34	+4	23	
6	Górnik Zabrze	22	9	5	8	32	33	−1	23	
7	Odra Opole	22	8	4	10	34	41	−7	20	
8	Lech Poznań	22	7	6	9	25	38	−13	20	
9	Gwardia Warsaw	22	5	8	9	23	36	−13	18	
10	Zagłębie Sosnowiec	22	6	5	11	35	43	−8	17	
11	Polonia Bydgoszcz (R)	22	5	5	12	20	36	−16	15	Relegated to II liga
12	Garbarnia Kraków (R)	22	5	2	15	27	46	−19	12	Relegated to II liga

Source: 90minut.pl (in Polish)
(C) Champions; (R) Relegated

== Results ==
Home \ Away	GAR	GÓR	GWA	LPO	LGD	LEG	ŁKS	OOP	BYG	RUC	WIS	ZSO
Garbarnia Kraków		3–1	3–0	4–0	2–2	0–1	0–3	0–1	1–2	0–1	1–1	3–2
Górnik Zabrze	4–0		0–0	3–0	2–0	3–2	0–2	1–1	2–0	3–1	2–0	1–2
Gwardia Warsaw	2–0	0–1		4–2	0–2	1–1	0–2	1–3	2–1	2–0	0–0	1–0
Lech Poznań	1–0	3–3	2–2		0–2	0–6	1–0	2–1	4–1	1–0	1–1	0–0
Lechia Gdańsk	0–1	2–0	0–0	1–0		1–3	1–1	2–1	1–0	2–2	2–0	2–1
Legia Warsaw	1–0	3–1	5–1	3–0	4–0		2–2	5–1	5–1	0–0	12–0	1–0
ŁKS Łódź	3–1	4–1	3–2	1–1	1–1	1–0		5–1	1–1	2–1	0–2	0–0
Odra Opole	4–1	1–1	1–1	3–1	0–1	2–5	0–3		2–1	0–3	1–0	5–1
Polonia Bydgoszcz	2–1	0–0	1–1	0–2	2–1	0–1	3–1	0–2		0–1	2–0	2–2
Ruch Chorzów	2–1	2–1	0–0	1–1	1–1	1–1	3–2	3–2	3–0		1–1	3–1
Wisła Kraków	8–3	7–1	2–1	1–3	0–1	2–0	2–0	0–0	2–0	1–2		6–0
Zagłębie Sosnowiec	5–2	0–1	7–2	1–0	0–0	0–4	3–1	4–2	1–1	1–4	1–2	

Source: 90minut.pl (in Polish)
Legend: Blue = home team win; Yellow = draw; Red = away team win.

== Top goalscorers ==
Rank	Player	Club	Goals
1	(Poland) Henryk Kempny	Legia Warsaw	21
2	(Poland) Ernest Pol	Legia Warsaw	18
3	(Poland) Lucjan Brychczy	Legia Warsaw	16
4	(Poland) Teodor Anioła	Lech Poznań	13
5	(Poland) Gerard Cieślik	Ruch Chorzów	11
5	(Poland) Edward Jankowski	Górnik Zabrze	11
7	(Poland) Paweł Krężel	Stal Sosnowiec	10
7	(Poland) Marian Machowski	Wisła Kraków	10
9	(Poland) Antoni Ciszek	Stal Sosnowiec	9
9	(Poland) Engelbert Jarek	Odra Opole	9
9	(Poland) Marian Norkowski	Polonia Bydgoszcz	9
9	(Poland) Władysław Soporek	ŁKS Łódź	9

== Attendances ==
#	Club	Average
1	ŁKS	26,364
2	Ruch Chorzów	22,909
3	CWKS	21,273
4	Wisła Kraków	16,909
5	Zagłębie Sosnowiec	16,636
6	Garbania Kraków	16,091
7	Lechia Gdańsk	15,909
8	Górnik Zabrze	15,545
9	Lech Poznań	14,909
10	Gwardia Warszawa	8,364
11	Polonia Bydgoszcz	7,818
12	Odra Opole	7,818
