= Hugo Zarich =

Argentine footballer

Personal information
- Full name: Marcos Hugo Zarich
- Date of birth: 17 March 1940
- Place of birth: Villa Eloísa, Santa Fe, Argentina
- Date of death: 5 November 2017 (aged 77)
- Height: 1.81 m (5 ft 11 in)
- Position: Midfielder

Senior career*
Years	Team	Apps	(Gls)
1958–1963	River Plate		
1964–1965	Atlanta		
1966–1968	Boca Juniors		
1968	Quilmes		
1969	Racing Club		
1969–1971	Toluca		

International career
1960	Argentina U23	6	(0)
- * Club domestic league appearances and goals

Marcos Hugo Zarich (17 March 1940 – 5 November 2017) was an Argentine football midfielder. He played most of his club career for River Plate and Boca Juniors and played for Argentina at the 1960 Summer Olympics.

== Playing career ==
Born in Villa Eloísa, Santa Fe, Zarich emerged from the youth team of Club Atlético River Plate. He would play in the Argentine Primera División for River Plate, Club Atlético Atlanta, Club Atlético Boca Juniors, Quilmes Atlético Club and Racing Club de Avellaneda.

In 1969, Zarich moved abroad to play for Deportivo Toluca F.C. in the Mexican Primera División.

Zarich played for Argentina at the 1960 Summer Olympics in Rome.
