= Guillermo Lorenzo =

Argentine footballer

Personal information
- Date of birth: 5 January 1939 (age 87)
- Place of birth: Buenos Aires, Argentina
- Position: Forward

Senior career*
Years	Team	Apps	(Gls)
- Boca Juniors
- * Club domestic league appearances and goals

Guillermo Lorenzo (born 5 January 1939) is an Argentine former footballer. He was also part of Argentina's squad for the 1960 Summer Olympics, but he did not play in any matches.
