= Tomasz Stefaniszyn =

Polish footballer

Personal information
- Full name: Tomasz Tadeusz Stefaniszyn
- Date of birth: 16 March 1929
- Place of birth: Stryj, Poland
- Date of death: 8 September 1986 (aged 57)
- Place of death: Warsaw, Poland
- Height: 1.76 m (5 ft 9 in)
- Position: Goalkeeper

Youth career
- 1945–1946: Tarnovia Tarnów

Senior career*
Years	Team	Apps	(Gls)
1946–1950	Garbarnia Kraków		
1950–1952	Legia Warsaw	32	(0)
1953–1965	Gwardia Warsaw		

International career
1952–1960	Poland	12	(0)
- * Club domestic league appearances and goals

Tomasz Tadeusz Stefaniszyn (16 March 1929 – 8 September 1986) was a Polish footballer who played as a goalkeeper. He competed in the 1952 Summer Olympics and in the 1960 Summer Olympics.

== Honours ==
Gwardia Warsaw

- Polish Cup: 1953–54
