= Rached Meddeb =

Tunisian footballer (born 1940)

Personal information
- Full name: Mohamed Rached Meddeb
- Date of birth: 22 October 1940 (age 86)
- Place of birth: Tunis, Tunisia
- Position: Midfielder

Senior career*
Years	Team	Apps	(Gls)
1959–1964	Espérance de Tunis		

International career
1960–1963	Tunisia	21	(4)
- * Club domestic league appearances and goals

Mohamed Rached Meddeb (Arabic: محمد راشد مدب; born 22 October 1940) is a Tunisian former footballer who played as a midfielder for Espérance Tunis. He also played for the Tunisian national team, and was selected to play for the team in the 1960 Summer Olympics.
