= Milan Kristić =

Yugoslav football coach

Managerial career
- Years: Team
- 1960–1961: Tunisia
- 1961–1966: CS Sfaxien

Milan Kristić was a Yugoslav football coach who managed the Tunisia national team from 1960 to 1961. He led the Tunisian side which competed in the 1960 Summer Olympics, where they suffered three defeats to Poland, Argentina and Denmark and exited the tournament in the group stage.

Kristić was Tunisia's first ever foreign manager and was succeeded in that post by his compatriot Frane Matošić.
