= Concetto Lo Bello =

Italian football referee

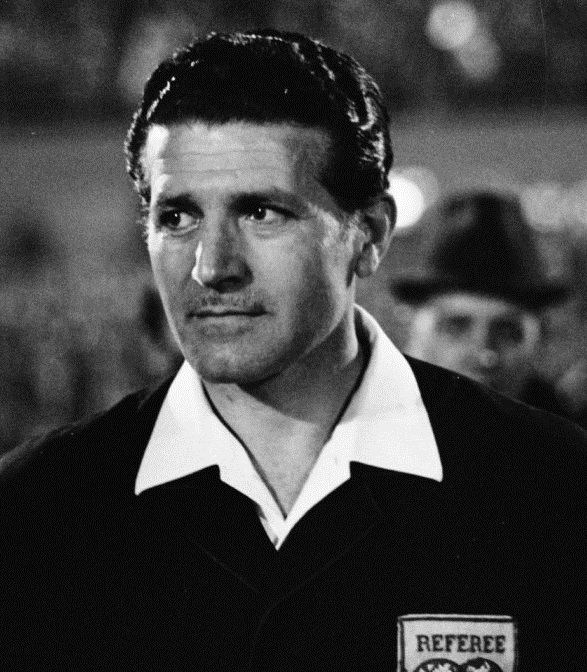
- Lo Bello at the 1970 European Cup Final
- Born: 13 May 1924; Syracuse, Kingdom of Italy
- Died: 9 September 1991 (aged 67); Syracuse, Italy
- Other occupation: Politician

Domestic
Years	League	Role

International
Years	League	Role
1958–1974	FIFA listed	Referee

Mayor of Syracuse
- In office 19 June 1986 – 30 November 1986
- Appointed by: City Council vote
- Preceded by: Fausto Spagna
- Succeeded by: Fausto Spagna

Concetto Lo Bello (13 May 1924 – 9 September 1991) was an Italian association football international referee. He holds the record for refereeing the most games in Serie A (328).

== Career ==
Lo Bello's career spanned from 1944 to 1974, refereeing his first international match in 1958.

He officiated in 34 international matches, including the West Germany–USSR semi-final at the 1966 FIFA World Cup in England. He had been provisionally chosen to referee the 1970 FIFA World Cup Final, but the Italian team reached the final, so he could not officiate.

Lo Bello also refereed the European Cup finals of 1968 and 1970, as well as the European Cup Winners' Cup final in 1967, the second leg of the Inter-Cities Fairs Cup final in 1966, the second leg of the 1966 Intercontinental Cup, and the second leg of the UEFA Cup final in 1974. He was also the referee for the final of the 1960 Summer Olympics in Rome, between Yugoslavia and Denmark, as well as the play-off match between France and Bulgaria to qualify for the 1962 World Cup in Chile, and the bronze medal match at Euro 1964 in Spain, between USSR and Denmark. Including both international matches and international club competitions, Lo Bello took charge of 93 games as a referee.

== After retirement ==
After retirement, Lo Bello entered politics in 1972, as a member of parliament for the Christian Democrat party. He was Minister of Sport for a spell, and, briefly, was Minister for Drought. In 1986, he was elected mayor of Syracuse, but was only in the job for five months. In 2012, he was posthumously inducted into the Italian Football Hall of Fame.

== Personal life ==
Lo Bello's son, Rosario, was also a referee.

== Major matches refereed ==
Date	Match	Tournament	Venue	Result	Ref
10 September 1960	Yugoslavia vs. Denmark	1960 Summer Olympics final	Stadio Flaminio, Rome	3–1	
21 September 1966	Zaragoza vs. Barcelona	1966 Inter-Cities Fairs Cup Final (second leg)	La Romareda, Zaragoza	2–4 (3–4 on aggregate)	
26 October 1966	Real Madrid vs. Peñarol	1966 Intercontinental Cup final (second leg)	Santiago Bernabéu Stadium, Madrid	0–2 (0–4 on aggregate)	
31 May 1967	Bayern Munich vs. Rangers	1967 European Cup Winners' Cup final	Städtisches Stadion, Nuremberg	1–0 (a.e.t.)	
29 May 1968	Benfica vs. Manchester United	1968 European Cup Final	Wembley Stadium, London	1–4 (a.e.t.)	
6 May 1970	Feyenoord vs. Celtic	1970 European Cup Final	San Siro, Milan	2–1 (a.e.t.)	
29 May 1974	Feyenoord vs. Tottenham Hotspur	1974 UEFA Cup Final (second leg)	De Kuip, Rotterdam	2–0 (4–2 on aggregate)	

== Honours ==
- Giovanni Mauro Award for Best Italian International Referee of the Season: 1963
- Italian Football Hall of Fame: 2012
