= Władysław Soporek =

Polish footballer and coach

Personal information
- Date of birth: 10 December 1927
- Place of birth: Grodzisk Mazowiecki, Poland
- Date of death: 25 October 1986 (aged 58)
- Place of death: Łódź, Poland
- Height: 1.73 m (5 ft 8 in)
- Position: Forward

Senior career*
Years	Team	Apps	(Gls)
1937–1938	Tur Grodzisk Mazowiecki		
1938–1946	Pogoń Grodzisk Mazowiecki		
1947	Jedwabnik Milanówek		
1948	Pogoń Grodzisk Mazowiecki		
1949–1950	Lublinianka		
1950–1952	CWKS Warsaw		
1953–1960	ŁKS Łódź		
1961–1964	Start Łódź		

International career
1957–1958	Poland	2	(0)

Managerial career
- Skra Częstochowa
- * Club domestic league appearances and goals

Władysław Soporek (10 December 1927 – 25 October 1986) was a Polish footballer and manager.

Soporek, whose first team was a local side Tur Grodzisk, spent the best years of his career in ŁKS Łódź, where he won the 1958 championship of Poland. A forward, he was the top scorer of the Ekstraklasa in the same year, with 18 goals. Apart from ŁKS (1953–1960), he also played for CWKS Warsaw (1950–1952), Lublinianka Lublin (1949–1950), and finished active playing in Start Łódź (1961–1964).

He twice capped for Poland, without scoring a goal.

== Honours ==
ŁKS Łódź

- Ekstraklasa: 1958

Individual

- Ekstraklasa top scorer: 1958
