= Juan Stauskas =

Argentine footballer

Personal information
- Full name: Juan Carlos Stauskas
- Date of birth: 6 August 1939 (age 87)
- Place of birth: Buenos Aires, Argentina
- Position: Defender

Senior career*
Years	Team	Apps	(Gls)
- River Plate
- * Club domestic league appearances and goals

Juan Carlos Stauskas (born 6 August 1939) is an Argentine former footballer who competed in the 1960 Summer Olympics.
