= Gábor Török (footballer) =

Hungarian footballer

Olympic medal record

Representing Hungary

Men's football
Bronze medal – third place	1960 Munich	Team competition

Gábor Török (30 May 1936 – 4 January 2004) was a Hungarian football goalkeeper, who played for Újpesti Dózsa. He won a bronze medal in football at the 1960 Summer Olympics with the Hungary national football team.
