= Lajos Faragó =

Hungarian footballer (1932–2019)

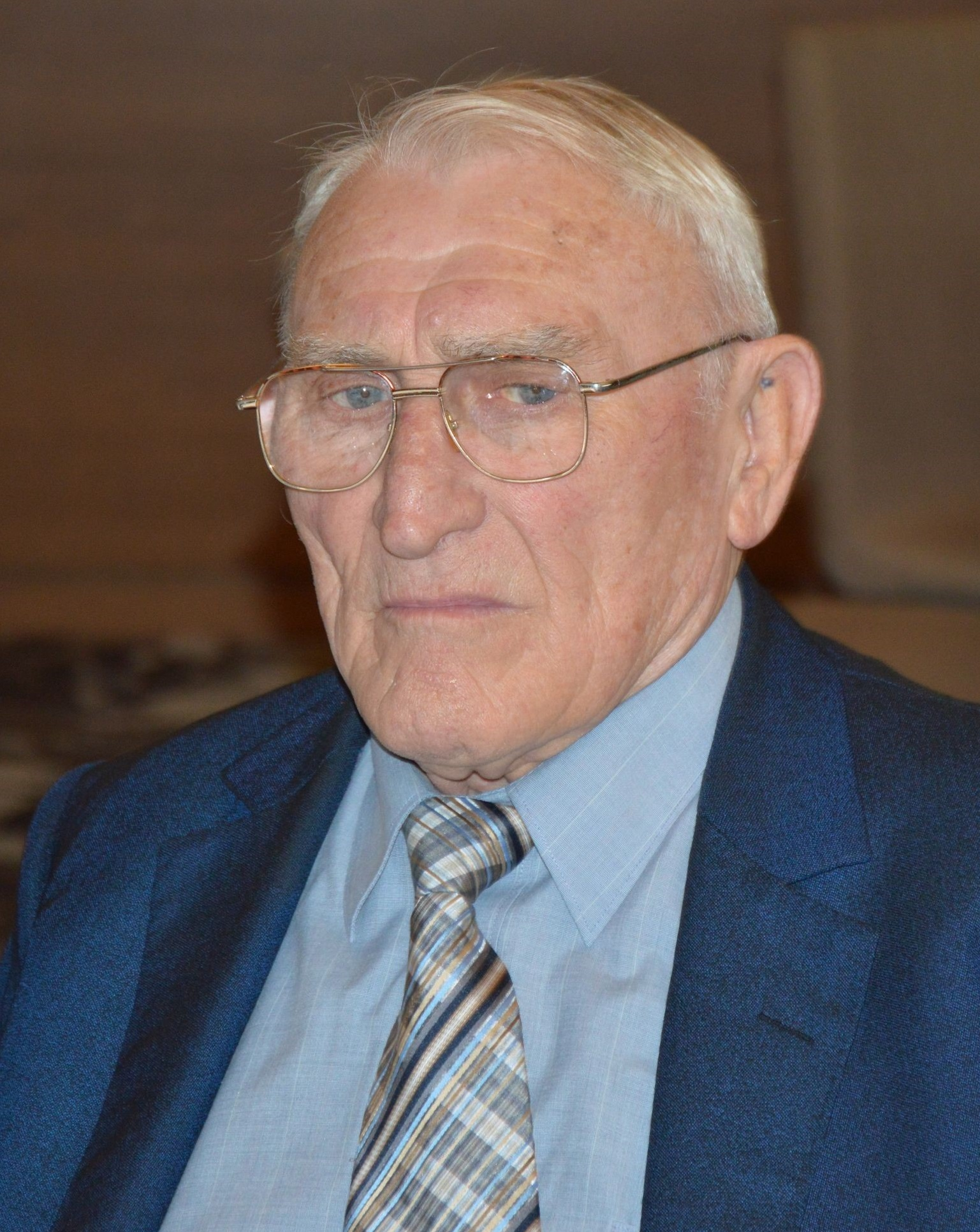
- Lajos Faragó in 2013

Personal information
- Date of birth: 3 August 1932
- Place of birth: Budapest, Hungary
- Date of death: 13 May 2019 (aged 86)
- Place of death: Budapest, Hungary
- Height: 1.78 m (5 ft 10 in)
- Position: Goalkeeper

Youth career
- 1945–1950: Kispest

Senior career*
Years	Team	Apps	(Gls)
1950–1963	Budapest Honvéd		

International career
1954–1960	Hungary		
1955–1961	Hungary B		

Managerial career
- 1964–1966: Budapest Honvéd (assistant)
- 1967: Táncsics SE
- 1968–1973: Budapest Honvéd (assistant)
- 1973–1974: Budapest Honvéd
- 1974–1979: Budapest Honvéd (assistant)
- 1979–1980: CD Matchedje de Maputo
- 1981–1986: Kossuth KFSE
- 1986–1987: Budapest Honvéd (assistant)
- * Club domestic league appearances and goals

Lajos Faragó (3 August 1932 – 13 May 2019) was a Hungarian footballer. He competed in the men's tournament at the 1960 Summer Olympics.
