= Ahmed Sghaïer =

Tunisian footballer

Personal information
- Full name: Ahmed Mohieddine Al-Sghaier
- Date of birth: 2 January 1937 (age 89)
- Place of birth: Tunis, Tunisia
- Position: Defender

Senior career*
Years	Team	Apps	(Gls)
1955-1965	US Tunisienne	84	(4)

International career
1960-1965	Tunisia	41	(0)
- * Club domestic league appearances and goals

Ahmed Mohieddine Al-Sghaier (Arabic: احمد محي الدين الصغير) (born 2 January 1937) is a Tunisian former footballer who played for US Tunisienne and the Tunisian national team.
