= Pál Orosz =

Hungarian football coach

Olympic medal record

Representing Hungary

Men's football
Bronze medal – third place	1960 Rome	Team competition

Pal Orosz (25 January 1934 – 12 May 2014) was a Hungarian footballer. He played for Hungarian National Olympic Football Team during the 1960 Summer Olympics in Rome, where they won the bronze medal.

Orosz died in Budapest, Hungary, from cancer, aged 80.
