= Ridha Rouatbi =

Tunisian footballer

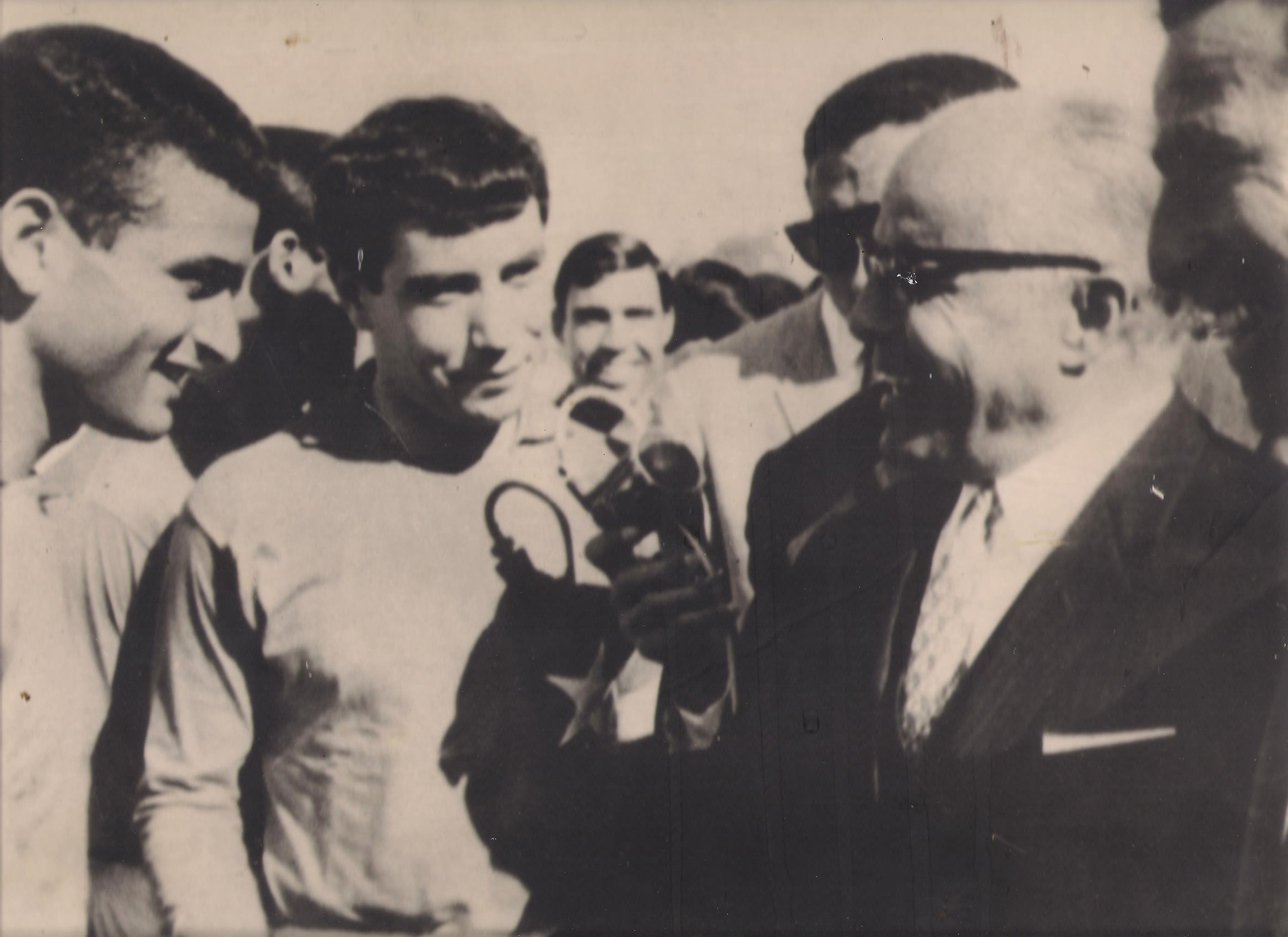

Personal information
- Full name: Ridha Al-Rouatbi
- Date of birth: 7 February 1938 (age 88)
- Place of birth: Sousse, Tunisia
- Position: Defender

Senior career*
Years	Team	Apps	(Gls)
1955-1961	Étoile du Sahel		
1961-1962	Étoile du Sahel		
1962-1967	Étoile du Sahel		

International career
1959-1963	Tunisia	35	(0)
- * Club domestic league appearances and goals

Ridha Al-Rouatbi (Arabic: رضا الرواتبي; born 7 February 1938) is a Tunisian former footballer who played as a defender for Étoile du Sahel. He also played for the Tunisian national team, and was selected to play for the team in the 1960 Summer Olympics.
