= Tibor Pál (footballer) =

Hungarian footballer

Personal information
- Date of birth: 15 September 1935 (age 91)
- Place of birth: Budapest, Hungary

International career
Years	Team	Apps	(Gls)
- Hungary

Tibor Pál (born 15 September 1935) is a Hungarian footballer. He competed in the men's tournament at the 1960 Summer Olympics.
