= Henryk Kempny =

Polish footballer

Personal information
- Full name: Henryk Paweł Kempny
- Date of birth: 24 January 1934
- Place of birth: Bytom, Poland
- Date of death: 29 May 2016 (aged 82)
- Place of death: Bytom, Poland
- Height: 1.74 m (5 ft 9 in)
- Position: Forward

Senior career*
Years	Team	Apps	(Gls)
1951–1954	Ogniwo Bytom		
1955–1956	CWKS Warsaw		
1958–1963	Polonia Bytom		
1963–1967	Górnik Wałbrzych		
1967–1970	CKS Czeladź		

International career
1955–1958	Poland	16	(6)
- * Club domestic league appearances and goals

Henryk Paweł Kempny (24 January 1934 – 29 May 2016) was a Polish footballer who played as a forward. He made 16 appearances for the Poland national team from 1955 to 1958.

== Honours ==
Ogniwo/Polonia Bytom

- Ekstraklasa: 1954, 1962

CWKS Warsaw

- Ekstraklasa: 1955, 1956

Individual

- Ekstraklasa top scorer: 1954, 1956
