= Julio Mattos =

Argentine footballer

Personal information
- Date of birth: 30 March 1940 (age 86)
- Position: Defender

Senior career*
| Years | Team | Apps | (Gls) |
- Argentinos Juniors
- * Club domestic league appearances and goals

Julio Mattos (born 30 March 1940) is an Argentine former footballer. He was also part of Argentina's squad for the 1960 Summer Olympics, but he did not play in any matches.
