= Oszkár Vilezsál =

Hungarian footballer

Personal information
- Date of birth: 17 September 1930
- Place of birth: Salgótarján, Hungary
- Date of death: 20 July 1980 (aged 49)
- Place of death: Göd, Hungary
- Position: Midfielder

International career
Years	Team	Apps	(Gls)
1960	Hungary Olympic	2	(0)

Oszkár Vilezsál (17 September 1930 – 20 July 1980) was a Hungarian footballer. He competed in the men's tournament at the 1960 Summer Olympics.
