= Imre Sátori =

Hungarian footballer

Personal information
- Date of birth: 7 March 1937
- Place of birth: Budapest, Hungary
- Date of death: 30 November 2010 (aged 73)
- Place of death: Budapest, Hungary

International career
Years	Team	Apps	(Gls)
1960	Hungary Olympic	5	(0)

Imre Sátori (7 March 1937 – 30 November 2010) was a Hungarian footballer. He competed in the men's tournament at the 1960 Summer Olympics, winning the bronze medal.
