= János Dunai =

Hungarian footballer (1937–2025)

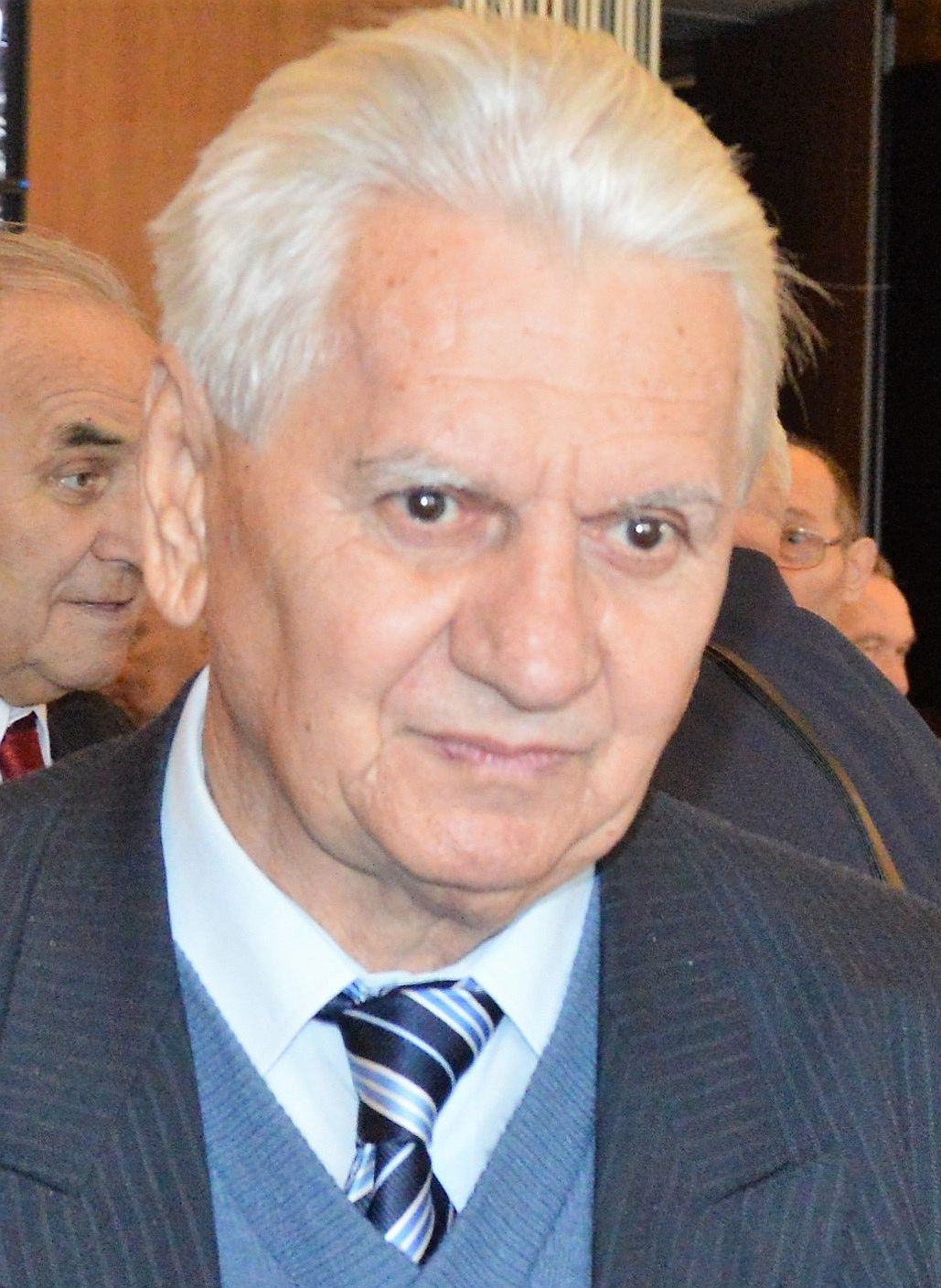

Personal information
- Date of birth: 26 June 1937
- Place of birth: Gara, Hungary
- Date of death: 13 February 2025 (aged 87)
- Place of death: Pécs, Hungary
- Position: Forward

Senior career*
Years	Team	Apps	(Gls)
1954–1959	Bajai Bácska Posztó		
1959–1970	Pécsi Dózsa	266	(70)

International career
1960	Hungary	1	(0)

Managerial career
- 1971–1973: Pécsi Ércbányász
- 1973–1975: Pécsi MSC
- 1976–1978: Pécsi MSC
- 1978–1979: Szegedi EAC
- 1979–1980: Pécsi Vasutas II
- 1980–1981: Pécsi Vasutas
- 1981–1982: Pécsi Vasutas
- 1982–1984: Sellye
- 1984–1985: Keszthelyi Haladás
- 1986–1987: Szigetvár
- * Club domestic league appearances and goals

János Dunai (26 June 1937 – 13 February 2025) was a Hungarian footballer who played as a forward. He was with the bronze medal–winning Hungary national team at the 1960 Summer Olympics at Rome, Italy. Dunai died in Pécs on 13 February 2025, at the age of 87.
