= Zoltán Dudás =

Hungarian footballer (1933–1989)

Personal information
- Date of birth: 8 August 1933
- Place of birth: Miskolc, Hungary
- Date of death: 13 September 1989 (aged 56)
- Place of death: Budapest, Hungary
- Position: Defender

Senior career*
Years	Team	Apps	(Gls)
1951–1955	Diósgyőri VTK	63	(0)
1956–1966	Budapest Honvéd FC	185	(0)

International career
1956–1960	Hungary	2	(0)
- * Club domestic league appearances and goals

Zoltán Dudás (8 August 1933 – 13 September 1989) was a Hungarian former footballer. He was with the bronze medal winning Hungary national team at the 1960 Summer Olympics at Rome, Italy.
