= Brahim Kerrit =

Tunisian footballer

Personal information
- Date of birth: 2 October 1940
- Place of birth: El Kef, French Tunisia
- Date of death: 22 April 2012 (aged 71)
- Height: 1.65 m (5 ft 5 in)
- Position: Midfielder

Senior career*
Years	Team	Apps	(Gls)
1957–1962	Stade Tunisien		
1962–1964	Caen		
1965–1969	Stade Tunisien		
- Club Sportif de Hammam-Lif

International career
- Tunisia
- * Club domestic league appearances and goals

Brahim Kerrit (2 October 1940 – 22 April 2012) was a Tunisian footballer. He participated in the 1960 Summer Olympics in Rome and scored two goals. He played professional football for Stade Malherbe Caen in France. He was born in El Kef.
