= Novak Roganović =

Serbian footballer

Personal information
- Full name: Novak Roganović
- Date of birth: 14 January 1932
- Place of birth: Senta, Kingdom of Yugoslavia
- Date of death: 4 February 2008 (aged 76)
- Place of death: Novi Sad, Serbia
- Position: Defender

Youth career
- Senta

Senior career*
Years	Team	Apps	(Gls)
1954–1963	Vojvodina	157	(7)
1963–1964	Austria Wien	18	(0)
1964–1965	Enschedese Boys	27	(0)
Total		202	(7)

International career
1960	Yugoslavia	7	(0)
Medal record
Men's Football
Representing Yugoslavia
Olympic Games
Gold medal – first place	1960 Rome	Team
- * Club domestic league appearances and goals

Novak Roganović (Serbian Cyrillic: Новак Рогановић; 14 January 1932 – 4 February 2008) was a Serbian footballer. He was part of the Yugoslav squad that won gold at the 1960 Summer Olympics.

He played for FK Vojvodina, Austria Wien and Enschedese Boys.

== International career ==
On the national level, Roganović made his debut for Yugoslavia in a January 1960 friendly match away against Morocco and earned a total of 7 caps (no goals). His final international was in the Olympic Games final against Denmark.
