= Giovanni Fanello =

Italian footballer (1939–2026)

Giovanni Fanello (21 February 1939 – 5 July 2026) was an Italian footballer who played as a forward.

== Career ==
Fanello began playing football with local side Polisportiva Pizzo. He turned professional with Catanzaro, and was the leading goalscorer of Serie C as he helped the club gain promotion to Serie B during the 1958–59 season. After playing for Italy at the 1960 Summer Olympics, Fanello signed with Serie A side A.C. Milan. However, his opportunities with the first team were limited, and he was loaned to Alessandria. He would appear for several other Italian clubs, including Napoli, and scored 17 goals in 80 Serie A appearances and 71 goals in 218 Serie B appearances. In 1973, he played abroad in the National Soccer League with Toronto Italia. He also served as a player-coach for Toronto Italia in 1973.

== Personal life and death ==
Fanello was born in Pizzo on 21 February 1939. He died on 5 July 2026, at the age of 87.

== Honours ==
Catanzaro

- Serie C1: 1958–59

Napoli

- Serie B runner-up: 1961–62
- Coppa Italia: 1961–62

Catania

- Cup of the Alps runner-up: 1964

Individual

- Serie B top goalscorer: 1960–61 with 26 goals in 38 appearances (Italian record)
