= Reg Leafe =

English football referee (1914–2001)

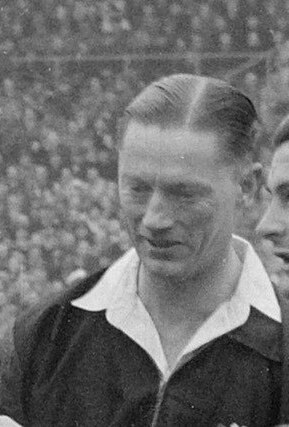
Leafe in 1953

Reginald Leafe referee (Germany-the Netherlands, 1956)

Reginald James Leafe (15 December 1914 – 2001) was a FIFA referee in the 1950s and early 1960s.

== Career ==
Leafe was appointed to the 1955 FA Cup Final at Wembley on 7 May 1955, when Newcastle United beat Manchester City 3–1. He was subsequently an English representative at the 1958 FIFA World Cup, taking charge of the Group A game between West Germany and Argentina on 8 June 1958. He then refereed a quarter-final tie as Sweden defeated the Soviet Union 2–0 on 19 June 1958.

=== Barcelona v Real Madrid, European Cup 1960 ===
Despite being the man in the middle for the famous Wolves versus Honvéd match in 1954 (his award of a penalty against Kovaks allowing Wolves to come back into the tie), Leafe is known on the continent as the referee who once disallowed 4 goals in the "El Clásico" match-up between Real Madrid and FC Barcelona in a 2nd round match in the European Cup.

In the first leg Arthur Ellis had awarded a late, controversial penalty for Barcelona when Sandor Kocsis was fouled outside the Madrid penalty area. In the second leg at the Nou Camp Leafe took charge. Kenneth Wolstenholme, for the BBC, called it "the game of all time". The mood of the evening was summed up, later, by the normally dignified Santiago Bernabeu commenting that Leafe was Barcelona's best player.

There are doubts as to whether Leafe was the man for the job. In total he disallowed four Real goals, and the game finished 2–1 to Barcelona. Phil Ball, a football historian, who saw footage of the game, remarked that the protests carried some substance since none of the goals "appear to be illegal in any way". Later Alfredo Di Stéfano remarked: "UEFA people didn't like us dominating 'their' cup. That's why they got English referees to make sure we didn't. After all, English referees were supposed to be the best. No one would suspect anything."^{†}

=== Rapid Vienna v Benfica, European Cup, 1961 ===
Later that season in the second leg of the semi-final in Austria, Leafe was at the centre of a massive row when deciding that the Rapid Vienna forward Robert Dienst had dived in the Benfica penalty area in the last minutes of the game. Various appeals to restore calm fell on deaf ears and the tie became the first European Cup match in history to be abandoned.

With Benfica winning the tie 4–1, Béla Guttmann later said to Leafe: "You should have let them have their penalty...It would have saved us a lot of trouble, and it wouldn’t have helped them reach the final anyway".

"Even if a team were leading by a hundred goals to nil", Leafe is said to have replied, "I would still not grant their opponents an unwarranted penalty".

Preceded by A Luty	FA Cup Final Referee; 1955	Succeeded by A Bond
