= Silvester Takač =

Serbian footballer and manager

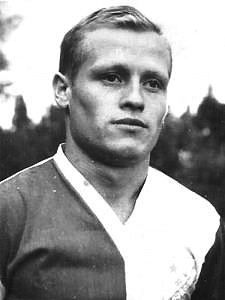

Personal information
- Date of birth: 8 November 1940 (age 85)
- Place of birth: Đurđevo, Kingdom of Yugoslavia
- Position: Striker

Senior career*
Years	Team	Apps	(Gls)
1958–1967	Vojvodina	182	(62)
1966–1969	Rennes	85	(37)
1969–1974	Standard Liège	111	(44)
Total		378	(143)

International career
1960–1966	Yugoslavia	12	(1)
1960–1964	Yugoslavia XI	4	(1)

Managerial career
- 1975–1978: DJK Konstanz
- 1979–1982: FC Liège
- 1982–1984: 1. FC Köln (assistant)
- 1984–1985: Sochaux
- 1986: RC Paris
- 1987–1994: Sochaux
- 1996: Créteil
- 1996–1997: Nice
- 1998: Nice
- 2001: Raja Casablanca
- 2001–2002: CS Sfaxien
Medal record
Men's Football
Representing Yugoslavia
Olympic Games
Gold medal – first place	1960 Rome	Team
- * Club domestic league appearances and goals

Silvester Takač (Serbian Cyrillic: Силвестер Такач; born 8 November 1940) is a Serbian-Yugoslavian former football forward and manager. He was part of the Yugoslav squad that won gold at the 1960 Summer Olympics.

== International career ==
On the national level, Takač made his debut for Yugoslavia against Israel at the 1960 Olympics and earned a total of 16 caps (4 unofficial), scoring 2 goals. His final international was a September 1966 friendly match against the Soviet Union.

== Honours ==
=== Manager ===
Nice

- Coupe de France: 1997
