= Salvador Ginel =

Argentine footballer

Hugo Salvador Ginel
Personal information
- Date of birth: 1 April 1938 (age 88)
- Place of birth: San Miguel de Tucumán, Tucumán, Argentina
- Height: 5 ft 9 in (1.75 m)
- Position: Defender

Senior career*
Years	Team	Apps	(Gls)
- Atlético Tucumán
- * Club domestic league appearances and goals

Hugo Salvador Ginel (born 1 April 1938) is an Argentine former footballer who competed in the 1960 Summer Olympics.
