= Moncef Chérif =

Tunisian footballer

President of Tunisian Football Federation
- In office 1990–1993
- Preceded by: Abdelwaheb Jemal
- Succeeded by: Moncef Foudhaili

Personal details
- Born: 8 November 1940 (age 86) Gabès, Tunisia
- Occupation: Footballer; Sport management
Association football career
- Position: Forward
Senior career*
Years	Team	Apps	(Gls)
1958–1966	Stade Tunisien		
International career
1960–1965	Tunisia	23	(8)
- * Club domestic league appearances and goals

Moncef Chérif (Arabic: منصف شريف) (born 8 November 1940) is a Tunisian former footballer who played for Stade Tunisien and the Tunisian national team.
