= Bent Hansen (footballer) =

Danish footballer (1933–2001)

Personal information
- Full name: Bent Hansen
- Date of birth: September 13, 1933
- Place of birth: Copenhagen, Denmark
- Date of death: March 8, 2001 (aged 67)
- Position: Right half

Senior career*
Years	Team	Apps	(Gls)
- B 1903

International career
1958–1965	Denmark	58	(1)
- * Club domestic league appearances and goals

Bent Hansen
Medal record

Men's football

Representing Denmark

Olympic Games
Silver medal – second place	1960 Rome	Team competition

Bent Hansen (13 September 1933 in Copenhagen – 8 March 2001) was a Danish amateur football (soccer) player who won a silver medal with the Denmark national football team at the 1960 Summer Olympics. He played a total of 58 national team matches from 1958 to 1965, in which he scored a single goal. On the club level, Bent Hansen played his entire senior career with Copenhagen club B 1903.

Hansen was a player of great stamina and positional sense with good technique, and his game was riskless without surprise or use of trickery, but also without mistakes. He made his debut for the senior Danish national team in a friendly match against the West Germany national football team on 24 September 1958. On 23 September 1959 Hansen scored his only international goal, as Denmark drew the Czechoslovakia national football team 2–2 in a qualification game for the 1960 European Nations' Cup. At the 1960 Olympics, he played in the position of right halfback on the Danish team, often linking up via short passes with right-winger Poul Pedersen. Hansen played all five games as Denmark won silver medals, losing to the Yugoslavia national football team in the final. Many of his Danish teammates moved abroad to play professionally during the 1960s, and were thereby banned from the amateur-only national team. Hansen and fellow Danish international Henning Enoksen were offered a professional contract with Torino Calcio, but Enoksen declined, and both offers were withdrawn. Hansen stayed an amateur, and played both games, as the Danish team finished fourth at the 1964 European Nations' Cup. On 29 November 1964 he broke Poul Pedersen's record as he became the first Dane to play 51 games for the national team. Bent Hansen ended his international career in October 1965, having played 58 international games; a record that was eventually broken by Henning Munk Jensen in May 1978.
