= Juan Oleniak =

Argentine footballer

Personal information
- Full name: Juan Carlos Oleniak
- Date of birth: 4 March 1942 (age 84)
- Place of birth: Buenos Aires, Argentina
- Height: 1.73 m (5 ft 8 in)
- Position: Forward

Senior career*
Years	Team	Apps	(Gls)
1960–1961	Racing Club	11	(0)
1962	Argentinos Juniors	24	(11)
1963–1964	Racing Club		
1965–1968	Universidad de Chile		
1968	Veracruz		
1969–1970	Santiago Wanderers	50	(15)
1971	Huracán Buceo		
1972–1973	San Martín de Mendoza		

International career
1960–1962	Argentina	3	(1)
- * Club domestic league appearances and goals

Juan Carlos Oleniak (born 4 March 1942) is an Argentine former footballer who played as a forward for clubs in Argentina, Mexico, Chile and Uruguay, as well as the Argentina national team at the 1962 FIFA World Cup in Chile. He also competed at the 1960 Summer Olympics.

== Career ==
After he retired from playing, Oleniak became a football coach. He managed Racing Club de Avellaneda on an interim basis after Nelson Chabay resigned in 1990.

== Honours ==
Racing Club

- Argentine Primera División: 1961
