= Zygmunt Gadecki =

Polish footballer (1938–2000)

Personal information
- Full name: Zygmunt Jakub Gadecki
- Date of birth: 21 January 1938
- Place of birth: Gdynia, Poland
- Date of death: 21 November 2000 (aged 62)
- Place of death: Gdynia, Poland
- Height: 1.71 m (5 ft 7 in)
- Position: Forward

Youth career
- 1953–1954: Arka Gdynia

Senior career*
Years	Team	Apps	(Gls)
1954–1956	Arka Gdynia		
1957–1959	Lechia Gdańsk		
1959–1960	Legia Warsaw		
1960–1962	Lechia Gdańsk		
1962–1967	Arka Gdynia		
1967–1969	Polonia SC		
1969–1970	Arka Gdynia		

International career
1960	Poland	6	(1)
- * Club domestic league appearances and goals

Zygmunt Jakub Gadecki (21 January 1938 – 21 November 2000) was a Polish footballer who competed in the 1960 Summer Olympics.
