= Marian Norkowski =

Polish footballer (1935–2001)

Personal information
- Full name: Marian Stanisław Norkowski
- Date of birth: 17 May 1935
- Place of birth: Toruń, Poland
- Date of death: 7 March 2001 (aged 65)
- Place of death: Warsaw, Poland
- Height: 1.80 m (5 ft 11 in)
- Position: Striker

Senior career*
| Years | Team | Apps | (Gls) |
| 1950–1952 | Pomorzanin Toruń | | |
| 1952–1970 | Polonia Bydgoszcz | 148 | (92) |
| 1955 | → Gwardia Warsaw (loan) | | |

International career
| 1958–1960 | Poland | 6 | (1) |

Managerial career
- Polonia Bydgoszcz
- * Club domestic league appearances and goals

Marian Stanisław Norkowski (17 May 1935 – 7 March 2001) was a Polish footballer who played as a forward.

Norkowski began his career in Pomorzanin Toruń, and in 1952 he moved to Polonia Bydgoszcz, where he remained until 1970. With Polonia, he played 7 seasons in the Ekstraklasa, scoring 91 goals in total. He was the top league scorer in the 1960 season, with 17 goals. He also capped six times for Poland, with one goal. Norkowski was a member of the Polish team for the 1960 Summer Olympics in Rome, but he did not play in any matches. After retiring, he worked as a coach, but without any achievements.

== Honours ==
Individual

- Ekstraklasa top scorer: 1960
