= Hans Christian Nielsen =

Danish footballer (1928-1990)

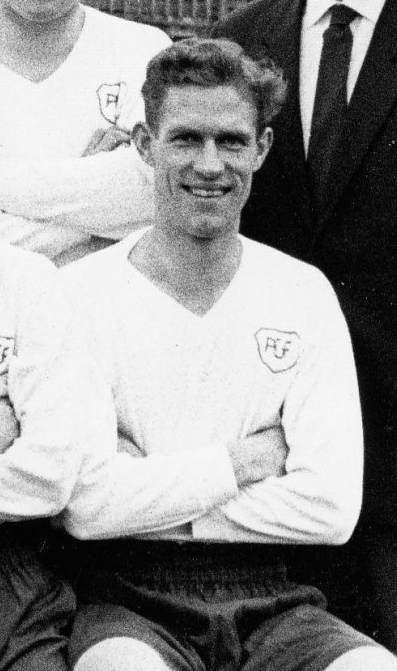
- Hans Christian Nielsen in 1960

Personal information
- Born: 10 May 1928 Odder, Denmark
- Died: 5 March 1990 (aged 61) Aarhus, Denmark
- Height: 186 cm (6 ft 1 in)
- Weight: 83 kg (183 lb)

Sport
- Sport: Association football
- Club: AGF, Århus
Medal record
Representing Denmark
Olympic Games
Silver medal – second place	1960 Rome	Team competition

Hans Christian Wedelsted Nielsen (10 May 1928 – 5 March 1990) was a Danish amateur association football defender. He played 25 matches for the Danish national team from May 1958 to June 1961, and won a silver medal at the 1960 Summer Olympics. Born in Odder, Hansen started his career at Odder IGF but would spend most of his career with nearby top-flight club Aarhus Gymnastikforening (AGF).

After ending his playing career, Nielsen worked as a salesman, and was a lifelong volunteer in the AGF youth department. He died on 5 March 1990 in Aarhus.
