= Jørn Sørensen =

Danish footballer (born 1936)

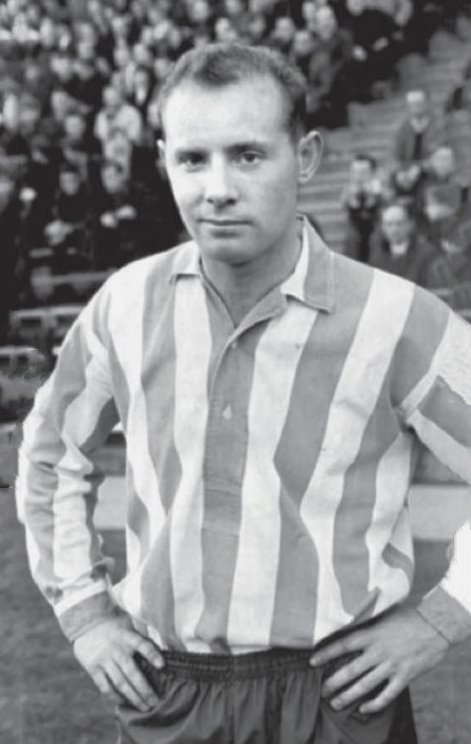

Personal information
- Date of birth: 17 October 1936 (age 90)
- Place of birth: Nibe, Denmark
- Height: 1.71 m (5 ft 7 in)
- Position: Striker

Senior career*
Years	Team	Apps	(Gls)
1958–1961	KB		
1961–1964	Metz	73	(15)
1964–1965	Greenock Morton	23	(9)
1965–1966	Rangers	12	(3)
1966–1973	Bellinzona		

International career
1958–1961	Denmark	31	(6)

Managerial career
- 1971–1973: Bellinzona
- 1977–1979: Bellinzona
Medal record
Representing Denmark
Olympic Games
Silver medal – second place	1960 Rome	Team competition
- * Club domestic league appearances and goals

Jørn Sørensen (born 17 October 1936) is a Danish retired association football striker. He played 31 games and scored six goals for the Denmark national football team, and won a silver medal at the 1960 Summer Olympics. He started his career with Danish club KB, before moving abroad to play professionally for FC Metz in France, Scottish clubs Greenock Morton and Rangers, as well as AC Bellinzona and US Giubiasco in Switzerland.
