= Engelbert Jarek =

Polish footballer (1935–2017)

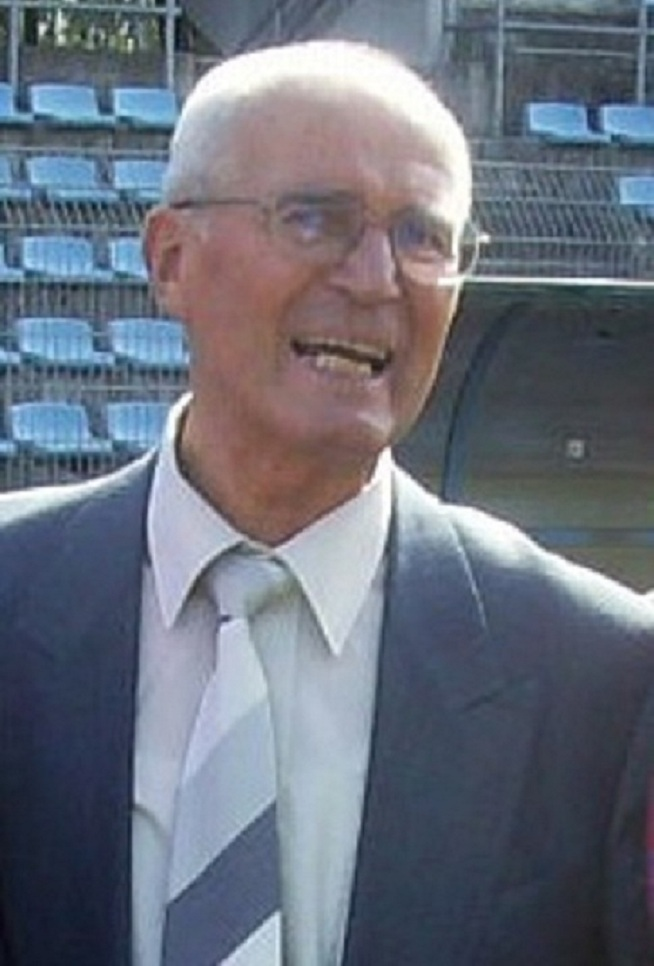

Personal information
- Full name: Engelbert Erwin Jarek
- Date of birth: 7 June 1935
- Place of birth: Rokittnitz, Hindenburg O.S., German Empire (today Rokitnica, Zabrze, Poland)
- Date of death: 23 August 2017 (aged 82)
- Place of death: Sinzig, Germany
- Height: 1.76 m (5 ft 9 in)
- Position: Forward

Youth career
- 1946–1950: Górnik Rokitnica

Senior career*
Years	Team	Apps	(Gls)
1950–1953	Górnik Rokitnica		
1953–1954	Ogniwo Nysa		
1954–1969	Odra Opole	222+	(91+)
- SC Sinzig

International career
1958–1962	Poland	3	(1)

Managerial career
- 1968–1969: Odra Opole
- 1969–1973: Odra Opole
- 1973–1975: Odra Opole
- Gwardia Opole
- MZKS Nysa
- MZKS Brzeg
- SG Bad Breisig
- * Club domestic league appearances and goals

Engelbert Erwin Jarek (7 June 1935 – 23 August 2017) was a Polish footballer and manager. He was part of Poland's squad at the 1960 Summer Olympics, but he did not play in any matches.

== Honours ==
Individual

- II liga top scorer: 1955
