= Poul Andersen (footballer, born 1930) =

Danish footballer

Personal information
- Date of birth: 2 January 1930
- Date of death: 30 December 1995 (aged 65)
- Position: Defender

Senior career*
Years	Team	Apps	(Gls)
- Skovshoved IF
Medal record
Men's Football
Representing Denmark
Silver medal – second place	1960 Rome	Team
- * Club domestic league appearances and goals

Poul Andersen (2 January 1930 – 30 December 1995) was a Danish footballer who competed in the 1960 Summer Olympics.
