= Erling Linde Larsen =

Danish footballer (1931-2017)

Personal information
- Date of birth: 9 November 1931
- Place of birth: Odense, Denmark
- Date of death: 15 December 2017 (aged 86)
- Place of death: Kerteminde, Denmark
- Position: Right-back

Senior career*
Years	Team	Apps	(Gls)
1953–1966	B1909		

International career
1956–1959	Denmark	20	(0)
- * Club domestic league appearances and goals

Erling Linde Larsen (9 November 1931 – 15 December 2017) was a Danish footballer who played as a right-back. He made 20 appearances for the Denmark national team from 1956 to 1959. He was also part of Denmark's squad at the 1960 Summer Olympics, but he did not play in any matches.
