= Jørgen Hansen (footballer) =

Danish footballer (1931-1986)

Personal information
- Full name: Jørgen Ludvig Hansen
- Date of birth: 24 December 1931
- Place of birth: Østermarie, Denmark
- Date of death: 30 April 1986 (aged 54)
- Place of death: Næstved, Denmark
- Height: 1.61 m (5 ft 3 in)
- Positions: Forward; midfielder

Senior career*
Years	Team	Apps	(Gls)
- Næstved IF

International career
1955–1962	Denmark	22	(2)
- * Club domestic league appearances and goals

Jørgen Ludvig Hansen (24 December 1931 – 30 April 1986) was a Danish footballer who played as a forward or midfielder. He made in 22 appearances for the Denmark national team from 1955 to 1962. He was also part of Denmark's squad at the 1960 Summer Olympics, but he did not play in any matches.
