= Henning Enoksen =

Danish footballer (1935-2016)

Personal information
- Date of birth: 26 September 1935
- Place of birth: Sejerslev, Morsø, Denmark
- Date of death: 25 September 2016 (aged 80)
- Place of death: Grenaa, Denmark
- Height: 1.78 m (5 ft 10 in)
- Position: Forward

Senior career*
Years	Team	Apps	(Gls)
1956–1961	Vejle BK		
1961–1967	Aarhus GF		

International career
1958–1967	Denmark	54	(29)
1960	Denmark Olympic	4	(1)

Managerial career
- 1972–1973: Iceland
Medal record
Men's Football
Representing Denmark
Summer Olympics
Silver medal – second place	1960 Rome	Team
- * Club domestic league appearances and goals

Henning Enoksen (26 September 1935 – 25 September 2016) was a Danish footballer, who most prominently won a silver medal with the Denmark national team at the 1960 Summer Olympics. He played a total of 54 national team games and scored 29 goals from 1958 to 1966, and also played for the Denmark U21 national team. Among other clubs, he played for Vejle Boldklub and AGF Aarhus in Denmark.

== Honours ==
Vejle BK

- Danish 1st Division: 1958
- Danish Cup: 1957–58, 1958–59

Aarhus GF

- Danish Cup: 1964–65

Individual

- Danish 1st Division topscorer: 1958, 1960, 1966
