= Henning Helbrandt =

Danish footballer (1935-2010)

Personal information
- Date of birth: 30 May 1935
- Place of birth: Copenhagen, Denmark
- Date of death: 18 September 2010 (aged 75)
- Height: 1.78 m (5 ft 10 in)
- Positions: Midfielder; defender

Senior career*
Years	Team	Apps	(Gls)
1953–1969	Kjøbenhavns Boldklub		

International career
1961	Denmark	3	(0)
- * Club domestic league appearances and goals

Henning Helbrandt (30 May 1935 – 18 September 2010) was a Danish footballer who played as a midfielder or defender. He played in three matches for the Denmark national team in 1961. He was also part of Denmark's squad for the 1960 Summer Olympics, but he did not play in any matches.
