= Poul Mejer =

Danish footballer

Personal information
- Date of birth: 2 November 1931
- Place of birth: Vejle, Denmark
- Date of death: 9 January 2000 (aged 68)
- Position: Winger

Youth career
- Vejle Boldklub

Senior career*
Years	Team	Apps	(Gls)
1950–1966	Vejle Boldklub	307	(128)

International career
1954–1960	Denmark B	11	(6)
1960–1962	Denmark	2	(0)
- * Club domestic league appearances and goals

Poul Mejer (2 November 1931 – 9 January 2000) was a Danish footballer who played as a winger.

== Career ==
Mejer played his entire career for Vejle Boldklub, where he got 307 caps for the club's first team. He was known for his fantastic pace, which was his primary weapon. From his wing position he scored many goals for his teammates.

Mejer experienced two league promotions with Vejle Boldklub in 1952 and 1956. In 1958 he was part in one of the biggest triumphs in the history of Vejle Boldklub as the club won The Double. Heplayed a major role in the Cup final as he scored the winner against rivals AGF. The triumph was followed up in the 1959 season as Vejle went on to win the Danish title once again.

Mejer was also part of the Denmark national team's squad at the 1960 Summer Olympics, but he did not play in any matches.

Mejer played his last match for Vejle Boldklub in April 1966.
