= Poul Jensen (footballer, born 1934) =

Danish footballer

Personal information
- Date of birth: 28 March 1934
- Place of birth: Vejle, Denmark
- Date of death: 6 July 2022 (aged 88)
- Height: 5 ft 9 in (1.75 m)
- Position: Right back

Youth career
- Vejle Boldklub

Senior career*
Years	Team	Apps	(Gls)
1953–1964	Vejle Boldklub	202	(3)

International career
1955	Denmark u-21	1	(0)
1959–1962	Denmark	32	(0)
- * Club domestic league appearances and goals

Olympic medal record

Representing Denmark

Men's Football
Silver medal – second place	1960 Rome	Team competition

Poul Jensen (28 March 1934 – 6 July 2022) was a Danish footballer who played 32 games for the Denmark national football team between 1959 and 1962, 21 of those as team captain.

Jensen played his entire career as right back for Vejle Boldklub. In 1958, Jensen took part in one of the clubs' biggest triumphs as Vejle won the Double. The next year the triumph was followed up as Vejle Boldklub went on to win the title once again, with Jensen selected as captain. He played 202 games league games and scored three league goals for Vejle, and played a total 259 games and scored five goals in all competitions for the club.

Jensen made his debut for Denmark in 1959 in a game against Iceland and went on to play thirty-two matches, captaining the team in twenty-one of them. In the 1960 Summer Olympics held in Rome, Jensen was part of the Danish team who reached the Final, picking up a silver medal as they lost to Yugoslavia. Jensen featured in all five matches for the Danes.
