= Finn Sterobo =

Danish footballer (1933–2021)

Personal information
- Date of birth: 17 December 1933
- Place of birth: Odense, Denmark
- Date of death: 25 February 2021 (aged 87)
- Position: Goalkeeper

International career
Years	Team	Apps	(Gls)
1962	Denmark	2	(0)

Finn Sterobo (17 December 1933 – 25 February 2021) was a Danish footballer. He played in two matches for the Denmark national football team in 1962. He was also part of Denmark's squad at the 1960 Summer Olympics, but he did not play in any matches.
