= Erik Gaardhøje =

Danish footballer (1938-2007)

Personal information
- Full name: Erik Foersom Gaardhøje
- Date of birth: 2 November 1938
- Place of birth: Frederikshavn, Denmark
- Date of death: 22 May 2007 (aged 68)
- Position: Goalkeeper

Senior career*
Years	Team	Apps	(Gls)
1957–1966	Esbjerg fB		

International career
1961–1963	Denmark	14	(0)
- * Club domestic league appearances and goals

Erik Foersom Gaardhøje (2 November 1938 – 22 May 2007) was a Danish footballer who played as a goalkeeper for Esbjerg fB. He made fourteen appearances for the Denmark national team from 1961 to 1963. He was also part of Denmark's squad at the 1960 Summer Olympics, but he did not play in any matches.
