= Stadio Flaminio =

Rugby union and association football venue in Rome

- Flaminio

- Aerial view of the stadium in 1961
- Interactive map of Stadio Flaminio
- Location: Viale dello Stadio Flaminio; IT-00196 Roma
- Coordinates: 41°55′37.04″N 12°28′20.28″E
- Owner: Municipality of Rome
- Operator: Italian Football Federation
- Capacity: 24,973
- Surface: Grass

Construction
- Groundbreaking: 1957
- Opened: 1959
- Renovated: 2008
- Closed: 2011; 15 years ago
- Cost: approx. 900 mln Lire
- Architect: Antonio Nervi
- Structural engineer: Pier Luigi Nervi
- Services engineers: Ingg. Nervi & Bartoli

Tenants
- Rugby Roma Olimpic; Capitolina (1996–2011); Marines Lazio Football (1991–2011); Italy national rugby union team (2000–2011); AS Lodigiani; S.S. Lazio (1989–1990); A.S. Roma (1989–1990)

Website
- stadioflaminio.org

The Stadio Flaminio is a stadium in Rome. It lies along the Via Flaminia, three kilometres northwest of the city centre, 300 metres away from the Parco di Villa Glori.

The interior spaces include a covered swimming pool, rooms for fencing, amateur wrestling, weightlifting, boxing, and gymnastics.

== History ==
The stadium in 1960

Pier Luigi Nervi designed the Flaminio Stadium with his son, the architect Antonio Nervi, between 1957 and 1958. The structure was built for the 1960 Summer Olympics and inaugurated in 1959. The Stadio Flaminio was built on the site of the previous Stadio Nazionale PNF. It was mostly devoted to football matches and served as the venue for the football final in the 1960 Summer Olympics.

Abandoned for years, the stadium is now in an advanced state of decay. This degeneration can be traced back to three principal causes: improper interventions that failed to respect the characteristics of the original structure, widespread deterioration caused by years of neglect and the physiological aging of materials and plant systems.

In July 2017, with the cooperation of the Municipality of Rome, Sapienza University, Pier Luigi Nervi Project Association, and Docomomo International received a grant from the Getty Foundation and its "Keeping it Modern program" to prepare a conservation plan for the Stadio Flaminio.

In 2021, Italian newspaper Leggo reported that Lazio president Claudio Lotito had made an 'important and serious proposal' to increase the capacity of the stadium to 40,000 and to return the club to the stadium on a permanent basis. On 13 December 2024, Lotito presented a pre-feasibility study for the Stadio Flaminio to Rome’s Mayor Roberto Gualtieri. He envisions developing a state-of-the-art stadium with a capacity of 50,570 spectators and a retractable roof – all while prioritizing the preservation of the original Nervi structure. Works are estimated to cost at least €438.2m, with the club privately financing over 80% of the amount. He has also outlined plans for the comprehensive redevelopment of the surrounding Flaminio district.

However, his ambition to redevelop the Stadio Flaminio faces competition from Roma Nuoto, who have proposed an alternative plan. They envision a multi-sport facility, including an Olympic-sized swimming pool, padel courts, and a hockey rink. This proposal minimizes the need for extensive infrastructure upgrades, such as new roads, parking, and transportation, making it a less disruptive and more easily implementable option. On 3 April 2025, the municipal council unanimously rejected the proposal.

In February 2026, Lazio announced that they envisioned a €480 million development of the stadium that would increase the capacity to 50,750 by adding a second suspended tier of seats to cover the original structure without touching it. In addition, the stadium’s interior spaces featuring a gym, swimming pool, boxing ring and more will be preserved and renovated. A green belt will be created around the venue with new trees while the facility’s external walkway will be made with 57,000 square metres of sound-absorbing material to reduce noise levels. The plan is to complete the project by 2031, allowing the stadium to be a candidate to host UEFA Euro 2032. Infrastructure such as parking and metro access will be upgraded.

== Events ==
Pink Floyd performed two concerts on 11 and 12 July 1988 during their A Momentary Lapse of Reason Tour.

U2 performed there in May 1987 in front of 45,000 fans and again for 2 nights in July 1993.

Bruce Springsteen played two sellout concerts in June 1988 both concerts was attended by a crowd of 40,000 Fans at a total of 80,000 people for his Tunnel of Love express tour having opened his European tour in Turin in front of 65 000 people with one concert at Stadio Communale.

Michael Jackson performed two sell-out concerts on 23 and 24 May 1988 during his Bad World Tour. Each concert was attended by a crowd of 40,000 fans. Police and security guards rescued hundreds of fans from being crushed in the crowd. Jackson also performed another sell-out concert on 4 July 1992 during the Dangerous World Tour, in front of 40,000 fans. An amateur recording can be found on YouTube for both concerts.

David Bowie played in front of 45,000 people in 1987.

In 1990, The Rolling Stones played two sellout concerts on 25 and 26 July as part of their Steel Wheels/Urban Jungle Tour, the last tour to feature Bill Wyman on bass guitar.

On 3 July 1991, Claudio Baglioni held the concert Oltre una bellissima notte. For the first time in the history of pop concerts, the stage is positioned in the center of the stadium, with the audience completely surrounding it, filling the stadium in every sector. The event, which attracted 90,000 spectators, was broadcast live on television by RAI and awarded by Billboard as the best concert of the year worldwide.

== Rugby ==
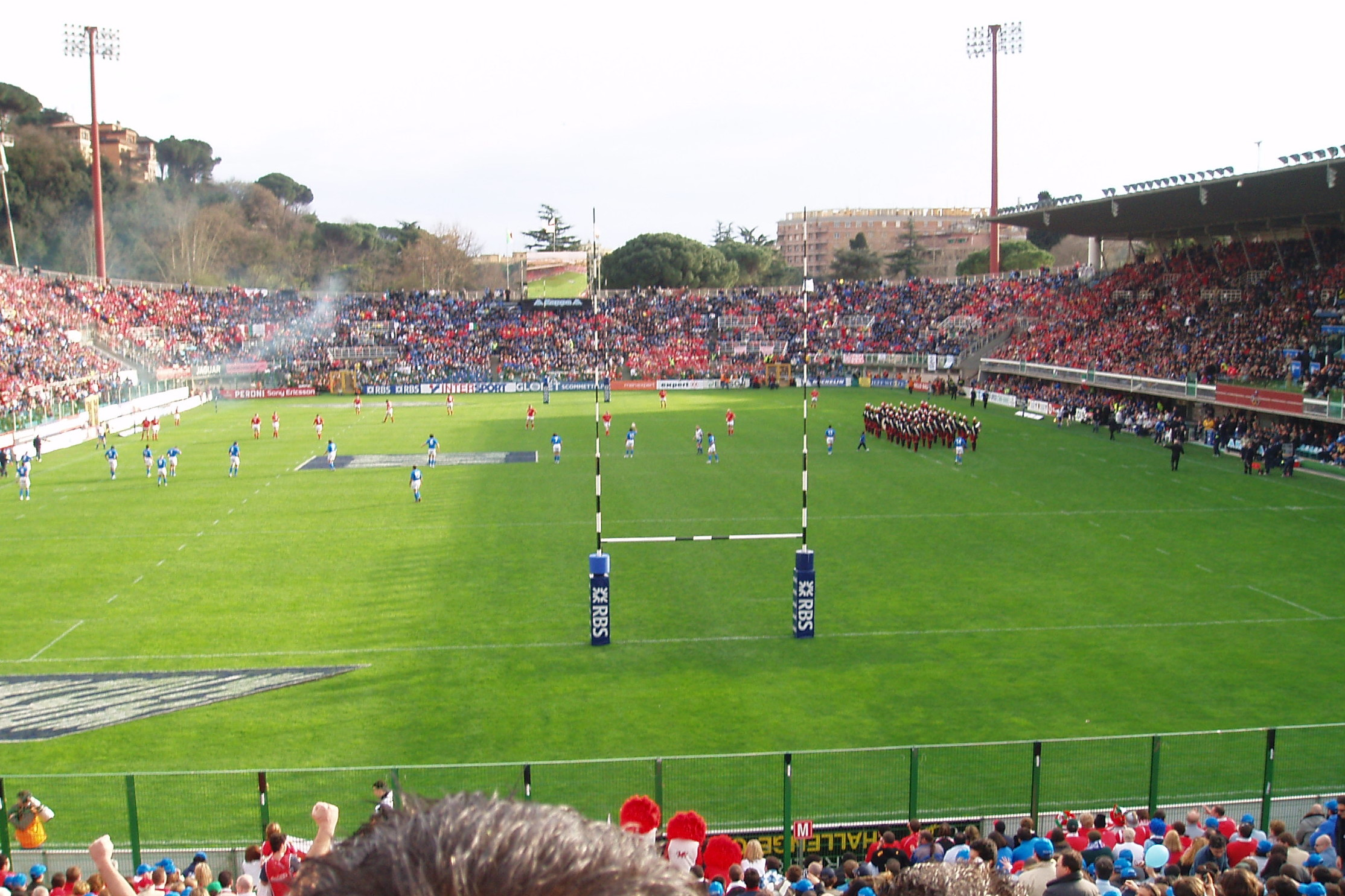
The stadium during a Six Nations game in 2007

It was the home of Italy rugby union national team for Six Nations tournament home matches from Italy's entry in the competition in 2000 until 2011.

The Italian Rugby Federation (FIR) announced, in January 2010, that the stadium would undergo an expansion, that will increase its capacity to 42,000, before the 2012 Six Nations Championship. A failure to progress these plans has been cited as the reason for moving Italy's home Six Nations games from 2012. With a capacity of 32,000 (8,000 covered), it was the smallest of the Six Nations stadiums. It is no longer considered big enough for the Italian national team and there were frequent reports that the national team would move to Genoa or to the Stadio Olimpico di Roma. This change was confirmed with the Italian Rugby Federation (FIR) becoming upset at broken promises of renovations. It was initially reported that the FIR would move Six Nations matches to Stadio Artemio Franchi in Florence. However, when the city finally began the promised renovations, FIR announced that it would instead keep its Six Nations home fixtures in Rome at Stadio Olimpico, and that it would return to the Flaminio once the project is completed.

The stadium was originally slated to become the home of Praetorians Roma, a newly formed team that would be one of Italy's two representatives in the Celtic League. However, it was later decided that Benetton Treviso would replace Praetorians.

== Football ==
In the 1989–90 Serie A season, both Roma and Lazio played at Stadio Flaminio during the renovations of Stadio Olimpico before the 1990 FIFA World Cup. Stadio Flaminio was also the home of Atletico Roma F.C., an association football club who played in Lega Pro Prima Divisione, but were dissolved in 2011.

| Preceded by Melbourne Cricket Ground; Melbourne | Summer Olympics; Football Men's Finals (Stadio Flaminio); 1960 | Succeeded by National Stadium; Tokyo |
