= Bent Krog =

Danish footballer (1935-2004)

Personal information
- Date of birth: 31 March 1935
- Place of birth: Copenhagen, Denmark
- Date of death: 13 August 2004 (aged 69)
- Position: Midfielder

International career
Years	Team	Apps	(Gls)
1961	Denmark	5	(0)

Bent Krog (31 March 1935 – 13 August 2004) was a Danish footballer. He played in five matches for the Denmark national football team in 1961. He was also part of Denmark's squad at the 1960 Summer Olympics, but he did not play in any matches.
