= Football at the 1960 Summer Olympics – Group 4 =

Football at the Summer Olympics group

Group 4 of the 1960 Summer Olympics football tournament took place from 26 August to 1 September 1960. The group consisted of Hungary, Peru, India and France. The top team, Hungary, advanced to the semi-finals.

== Teams ==
Team	Region	Method of qualification	Date of qualification	Finals appearance	Last appearance	Previous best performance							
Team	Region	Method of qualification	Date of qualification	Finals appearance	Last appearance	Previous best performance	Hungary	Europe	Europe Group 7 winners	6 April 1960	5th	1952	Gold medal (1952)
Peru	Americas	Americas second round runners-up	24 April 1960	2nd	1936	Quarter-finals (1936)							
India	Asia	Asia second round winner	30 April 1960	4th	1956	Fourth place (1956)							
France	Europe	Europe Group 6 winners	1 May 1960	8th	1952	Silver medal (1900)							

== Standings ==
Pos	Team	Pld	W	D	L	GF	GA	GD	Pts	Qualification
1	Hungary	3	3	0	0	15	3	+12	6	Advanced to knockout stage
2	France	3	1	1	1	3	9	−6	3	
3	Peru	3	1	0	2	6	9	−3	2	
4	India	3	0	1	2	3	6	−3	1	

Source: RSSSF

In the semi-finals, the winners of Group 4, Hungary, advanced to play the winners of Group 3, Denmark.

== Matches ==
All times listed are local, CET (UTC+1).

=== Hungary vs India ===
26 August 1960
16:00

Hungary	2–1	India
Göröcs 23'; Albert 56'	Report	Balaram 79'

Stadio Tommaso Fattori, L'Aquila
Referee: Bahri Ben Said (Tunisia)

12	Gábor Török
2	Dezső Novák
3	Pál Várhidi
4	Jenő Dalnoki
5	Oszkár Vilezsál
6	Ferenc Kovács
7	Imre Sátori
8	János Göröcs
9	Flórián Albert
10	Pál Orosz
11	Gyula Rákosi
Substitutions:
	Lajos Faragó
	Zoltán Dudás
	János Dunai
	Kálmán Mészöly
	László Pál
	Tibor Pál
	Ernő Solymosi
	Antal Szentmihályi
Manager:
(Hungary) Béla Volentik

1	Peter Thangaraj
2	Jarnail Singh
3	Sheikh Abdul Latif
4	Mariappa Kempaiah
5	O. Chandrashekar
6	Dharmalingam Kannan
7	P. K. Banerjee
8	Chuni Goswami
9	Yousuf Khan
10	Simon Sundararaj
11	Tulsidas Balaram
Substitutions:
	Mundiyath Devdas
	Fortunato Franco
	Arun Ghosh
	Syed Shahid Hakim
	H. H. Hamid
	Malay Kumar Lahiri
	S. S. Narayan
	Ram Bahadur Chettri
Manager:
(India) Syed Abdul Rahim

Assistant referees:
Raoul Righi (Italy)
Carlo Babini (Italy)

=== France vs Peru ===
26 August 1960
21:00

France	2–1	Peru
Giamarchi 67'; Quédec 90'	Report	Uribe 1'

Stadio Olimpico Grande Torino, Florence
Referee: Emil Erlich (Yugoslavia)

1	Charles Samoy
2	Louis Polonia
4	Jean-Baptiste Bordas
6	Marcel Artelesa
7	Yvon Quédec
8	Ahmed Arab	(red card) 58'
9	André Giamarchi
10	Gérard Coinçon
11	Marcel Loncle
12	Gines Gonzalez
14	Raymond Baratto
Substitutions:
Jean Wettstein
Gérard Aygoui
Pierre Bodin
Claude Dubaële
Jean-Marie Élisé
François Philippe
Max Samper
Jacques Stamm
Manager:
(France) Jean Rigal

1	Carlos Salinas
2	Eloy Campos
3	Daniel Eral
4	Teodoro Luña
5	Héctor de Guevara
6	Humberto Arguedas
7	Jaime Ruiz
8	Alejandro Guzmán
9	Gerardo Altuna
10	Ángel Uribe
11	Alberto Gallardo
Substitutions:
	Herminio Campos
	Juan Biselach
	Víctor Boulanger
	Javier Cáceres
	Hugo Carmona
	Tomás Iwasaki
	Nicolas Nieri
	Alberto Ramírez
Manager:
(Hungary) György Orth

Assistant referees:
Pietro Bonetto (Italy)
Carlo Gambarotta (Italy)

=== France vs India ===
29 August 1960
21:00

France	1–1	India
Coinçon 82'	Report	Banerjee 71'

Stadio Olimpico Comunale, Grosseto
Referee: Raymond Morgan (Canada)

1	Jean Wettstein
2	Louis Polonia
3	François Philippe
4	Max Samper	Booked
5	Pierre Bodin
6	Marcel Artelesa
7	Jacques Stamm
8	Gérard Coinçon
9	André Giamarchi
10	Claude Dubaële
11	Yvon Quédec
Substitutions:
	Charles Samoy
	Gérard Aygoui
	Raymond Baratto
	Jean-Marie Élisé
	Gines Gonzalez
	Jean-Baptiste Bordas
	Marcel Loncle
Manager:
(France) Jean Rigal

1	Peter Thangaraj
2	Jarnail Singh
3	Sheikh Abdul Latif
4	Mariappa Kempaiah
5	O. Chandrashekar
6	Ram Bahadur Chettri
7	P. K. Banerjee
8	Chuni Goswami
9	Yousuf Khan
10	Simon Sundararaj
11	Tulsidas Balaram
Substitutions:
	Mundiyath Devdas
	Fortunato Franco
	Arun Ghosh
	Syed Shahid Hakim
	H. H. Hamid
	Dharmalingam Kannan
	Malay Kumar Lahiri
	S. S. Narayan
Manager:
(India) Syed Abdul Rahim

Assistant referees:
Reg Leafe (Great Britain)
Raoul Righi (Italy)

=== Hungary vs Peru ===
29 August 1960
21:00

Hungary	6–2	Peru
Albert 17', 87'; Rákosi 27'; Göröcs 33'; Dunai 46', 63'	Report	Ramírez 25', 79'

Stadio San Paolo, Naples
Referee: Piero Bonetto (Italy)

1	Lajos Faragó
2	Dezső Novák
3	Pál Várhidi
4	Jenő Dalnoki
6	Ferenc Kovács
8	János Göröcs
9	Flórián Albert
11	Gyula Rákosi
14	Ernő Solymosi
15	Tibor Pál
16	János Dunai
Substitutions:
	Gábor Török
	Zoltán Dudás
	Kálmán Mészöly
	Pál Orosz
	László Pál
	Imre Sátori
	Antal Szentmihályi
	Oszkár Vilezsál
Manager:
(Hungary) Béla Volentik

1	Carlos Salinas
2	Eloy Campos
3	Daniel Eral
4	Teodoro Luña
5	Héctor de Guevara
6	Humberto Arguedas
10	Ángel Uribe
11	Alberto Gallardo
12	Javier Cáceres
14	Nicolas Nieri
15	Alberto Ramírez
Substitutions:
	Herminio Campos
	Gerardo Altuna
	Juan Biselach
	Víctor Boulanger
	Hugo Carmona
	Alejandro Guzmán
	Tomás Iwasaki
	Jaime Ruiz
Manager:
(Hungary) György Orth

Assistant referees:
Raoul Righi (Italy)
Carlo Gambarotta (Italy)

=== Hungary vs France ===
1 September 1960
16:00

Hungary	7–0	France
Albert 12', 85'; Göröcs 34', 59', 77'; Dunai 41', 79'	Report

Stadio Flaminio, Rome
Referee: Vincenzo Orlandini (Italy)

12	Gábor Török
3	Pál Várhidi
4	Jenő Dalnoki
6	Ferenc Kovács
8	János Göröcs
9	Flórián Albert
11	Gyula Rákosi
13	Zoltán Dudás
14	Ernő Solymosi
15	Tibor Pál
16	János Dunai
Substitutions:
	Lajos Faragó
	Kálmán Mészöly
	Dezső Novák
	Pál Orosz
	László Pál
	Imre Sátori
	Antal Szentmihályi
	Oszkár Vilezsál
Manager:
(Hungary) Lajos Baróti

1	Charles Samoy
2	Louis Polonia
3	François Philippe
4	Jean-Baptiste Bordas
5	Pierre Bodin
6	Marcel Artelesa
7	Yvon Quédec
8	Ahmed Arab
9	André Giamarchi
11	Marcel Loncle
14	Raymond Baratto
15	Jacques Stamm
Substitutions:
	Jean Wettstein
	Gérard Aygoui
	Gérard Coinçon
	Claude Dubaële
	Jean-Marie Élisé
	Gines Gonzalez
	Max Samper
Manager:
(France) Jean Rigal

Assistant referees:
Gennaro Marchese (Italy)
Giuseppe Adami (Italy)

=== Peru vs India ===
1 September 1960
21:00

Peru	3–1	India
Nieri 27', 53'; Iwasaki 85'	Report	Balaram 88'

Stadio Adriatico – Giovanni Cornacchia, Pescara
Referee: Hussein Imam (United Arab Republic)

19	Herminio Campos
2	Eloy Campos
6	Gerardo Altuna
7	Jaime Ruiz
10	Ángel Uribe
11	Alberto Gallardo
13	Hugo Carmona
14	Nicolas Nieri
16	Juan Biselach
17	Víctor Boulanger
18	Tomás Iwasaki
Substitutions:
	Carlos Salinas
	Humberto Arguedas
	Javier Cáceres
	Héctor de Guevara
	Daniel Eral
	Alejandro Guzmán
	Teodoro Luña
	Alberto Ramírez
Manager:
(Hungary) György Orth

1	Peter Thangaraj
2	Jarnail Singh
3	Sheikh Abdul Latif
4	Mariappa Kempaiah
5	O. Chandrashekar
6	Ram Bahadur Chettri
7	P. K. Banerjee
8	Chuni Goswami
9	Yousuf Khan
10	Simon Sundararaj
11	Tulsidas Balaram
Substitutions:
	Mundiyath Devdas
	Fortunato Franco
	Arun Ghosh
	Syed Shahid Hakim
	H. H. Hamid
	Dharmalingam Kannan
	Malay Kumar Lahiri
	S. S. Narayan
Manager:
(India) Syed Abdul Rahim

Assistant referees:
Raoul Righi (Italy)
Gino Rigato (Italy)

== See also ==
- Hungary at the Olympics
- Peru at the Olympics
- India at the Olympics
- France at the Olympics
