= Peru at the 1960 Summer Olympics =

- IOC code: PER
- NOC: Peruvian Olympic Committee

in Rome
- Competitors: 31 in 3 sports
- Medals: Gold 0 Silver 0 Bronze 0 Total 0

Summer Olympics appearances (overview)
- 1900; 1904–1932; 1936; 1948; 1952; 1956; 1960; 1964; 1968; 1972; 1976; 1980; 1984; 1988; 1992; 1996; 2000; 2004; 2008; 2012; 2016; 2020; 2024; 2028

Peru competed at the 1960 Summer Olympics in Rome, Italy. 31 competitors, all men, took part in 8 events in 3 sports. Peru returned to the football tournament once more after the controversial 1936 Olympics. Most of the athletes that represented Peru were part of the football squad. Peru also participated in shooting and rowing events.

== Football ==
Only the team with the most points advanced to the Semifinals. Peru lost its first two matches against France and Hungary but won its third match against India which gave them two points

=== Group D ===
Team	Pld	W	D	L	GF	GA	GD	Pts
Hungary	3	3	0	0	15	3	+12	6
France	3	1	1	1	3	9	−6	3
Peru	3	1	0	2	6	9	−3	2
India	3	0	1	2	3	6	−3	1

26 August 1960
12:00

France	2 – 1	Peru
Giamarchi 67'; Quédec 90'	Report	Uribe 1'

Florence
Referee: Erlich (YUG)

29 August 1960
12:00

Hungary	6 – 2	Peru
Albert 17', 87'; Rákosi 27'; Göröcs 33'; Dunai 46', 63'	Report	Ramirez 25', 79'

Naples
Referee: Bonetto (ITA)

1 September 1960
12:00

Peru	3 – 1	India
Nieri 27', 53'; Iwasaki 85'	Report	Balamaran 88'

Pescara
Referee: Imam (UAE)

=== Squad ===
Head coach: (Hungary) György Orth

Pos.	Player	DoB	Age	Caps	Club	Tournament games	Tournament goals	Minutes played	Sub off	Sub on	Cards yellow/red
	Gerardo Altuna	7 April 1939	21	?
	Humberto Aguerdas	31 October 1937	22	?
	Juan Biselach	7 August 1940	20	?
	Victor Boulanger	15 July 1940	20	?
	Javier Caceres	8 September 1939	20	?
DF	Eloy Campos	31 May 1942	18	?
GK	Herminio Campos	25 April 1937	22	?
[MF]	Hugo Carmona	1 April 1939	21	?
	Héctor De Guevara	20 March 1940	20	?
	Daniel Eral	17 October 1940	19	?
FW	Alberto Gallardo	28 November 1940	19	?	(Peru) Sporting Cristal
	Alejandro Guzmán	11 January 1941	19	?
	Thomas Iwasaki	13 November 1937	22	?
	Teodoro Luna	29 October 1938	21	?
	Nicolas Nieri	6 December 1939	20	?
	Alberto Ramírez	3 January 1941	19	?
	Jaime Ruiz	23 May 1935	25	?
GK	Carlos Salinas	12 October 1938	21	?
FW	Ángel Uribe	29 September 1943	16	?	(Peru) Universitario de Deportes

== Shooting ==
Pistol

Athlete	Event	Final	
Athlete	Event	Score	Rank
Guillermo Cornejo	25 metre rapid fire pistol	564	36
Pedro Garcia	25 metre rapid fire pistol	557	41
Antonio Vita	50 metre	535	20
Pedro Puente	50 metre	522	37

Rifle

Athlete	Event	Qualifier		Final	
Athlete	Event	Score	Rank	Score	Rank
Rubén Váldez	300 m rifle 3 positions	—N/a		1028	35
Luis Albornoz	300 m rifle 3 positions	—N/a		1037	33
Carlos Cedron	50 m rifle 3 positions	528	55	did not advance	
Carlos Lastarria	50 m rifle 3 positions	524	59	did not advance	
Carlos Cedron	50 m rifle prone	378	30	did not advance	
Carlos Lastarria	50 m rifle prone	390	5	578	29
Enrique Dibos	Trap	88		155	36
Eduard de Atzel	Trap			did not advance	

== Rowing ==
Peru had two male rowers participate in one out of seven rowing events in 1960.

Athlete(s)	Event	Heats		Repechage		Semifinals		Final	
Athlete(s)	Event	Time	Rank	Time	Rank	Time	Rank	Time	Rank
Estuardo Masías; Víctor Puente	Coxless pair	7:55.28	5 R	7:45.15	3	did not advance			
