= France Olympic football team results =

This article provides details of football matches played by the France Olympic football team.

== 1940s ==
=== 1948 ===
31 July 1948 Summer Olympics First round	France	2–1	India	London, United Kingdom
18:30 UTC+1	Courbin 30'; Persillon 89'	Report	Raman 70'	Stadium: Lynn Road; Attendance: 17,000; Referee: Gunnar Dahlner (Swedish)

5 August 1948 Summer Olympics Quarter-finals	Great Britain	1–0	France	London, United Kingdom
18:30 UTC+1	Hardisty 29'	Report		Stadium: Craven Cottage; Attendance: 25,000; Referee: Karel van der Meer (Netherlands)

== 1950s ==
=== 1952 ===
15 July 1952 Summer Olympics Preliminary round	Poland	2–1	France	Lahti, Finland
19:00 UTC+2	Trampisz 31'; Krasówka 49'	Report	Leblond 30'	Stadium: Lahden kisapuisto Attendance: 3,752; Referee: Karel van der Meer (Netherlands)

=== 1959 ===
11 November 1960 Summer Olympics qualification Group 6	France	1–0	Luxembourg	Dijon, France
14:30 UTC+1	Quédec 37'	Report		Stadium: Parc des Sports; Referee: Antonio Moriconi (Italy)

22 November 1960 Summer Olympics qualification Group 6	Switzerland	1–2	France	Luzern, Switzerland
	Grand 43'	Report	Quédec 19'; Coinçon 87'

== 1960s ==
=== 1960 ===
10 April 1960 Summer Olympics qualification Group 6	Luxembourg	5–3	France	Luxembourg City, Luxembourg
	Brenner 5' (pen.); Theis 7'; Kunnert 14'; Pilot 53'; Konter 75'	Report	Arab 15'; Quédec 40', 55'	Stadium: Stade Municipal

1 May 1960 Summer Olympics qualification Group 6	France	1–0	Switzerland	Chambéry, France
	Aigony 37'	Report

26 August 1960 Summer Olympics Group 4	France	2–1	Peru	Florence, Italy
21:00 UTC+1	Giamarchi 67'; Quédec 90'	Report	Uribe 1'	Stadium: Stadio Olimpico Grande Torino; Referee: Emil Erlich (Yugoslavia)

29 August 1960 Summer Olympics Group 4	France	1–1	India	Grosseto, Italy
21:00 UTC+1	Coinçon 82'	Report	Banerjee 71'	Stadium: Stadio Olimpico Comunale; Referee: Raymond Morgan (Canada)

1 September 1960 Summer Olympics Group 4	Hungary	7–0	France	Rome, Italy
16:00 UTC+1	Albert 12', 85'; Göröcs 34', 59', 77'; Dunai 41', 79'	Report		Stadium: Stadio Flaminio; Referee: Vincenzo Orlandini (Italy)

=== 1963 ===
28 September 1964 Summer Olympics qualification Group 5	Czechoslovakia	4–0	France	Plzeň, Czechoslovakia
		Report

27 October 1964 Summer Olympics qualification Group 5	France	2–4	Czechoslovakia	Poitiers, France
		Report

=== 1967 ===
15 October 1968 Summer Olympics qualification Group 3	Finland	1–1	France	Helsinki, Finland
14:00 UTC+2	Laine 22'	Report	Hallet 23'	Stadium: Helsinki Olympic Stadium; Attendance: 7,691; Referee: Alexandru Pîrvu (Romania)

29 October 1968 Summer Olympics qualification Group 3	France	3–1	Finland	Paris, France
	Case 25'; Zix 70'; Horlaville 72'	Report	Lindholm 30'	Attendance: 5,702; Referee: Joaquim Campos (Portugal)

=== 1968 ===
1 May 1968 Summer Olympics qualification Group 3	France	3–1	Austria	Paris, France

12 May 1968 Summer Olympics qualification Group 3	Austria	1–1	France	Eisenstadt, Austria

13 October 1968 Summer Olympics Group A	France	3–1	Guinea	Mexico City, Mexico
12:00 UTC–6	Hallet 61'; Horlaville 64'; Périgaud 70'	Report	Camara 79'	Stadium: Estadio Cuauhtémoc; Referee: Milivoje Gugulovic (Yugoslavia)

15 October 1968 Summer Olympics Group A	France	4–1	Mexico	Mexico City, Mexico
15:30 UTC–6	Case 20', 69'; Teamboueon 30'; Medina 36' (o.g.)	Report	Victorino 26'	Stadium: Estadio Azteca; Referee: Erwin Hieger (Peru)

17 October 1968 Summer Olympics Group A	Colombia	2–1	France	Mexico City, Mexico
15:30 UTC–6	Tamayo 14'; Jaramillo 35'	Report	Teamboueon 59'	Stadium: Estadio Cuauhtémoc; Referee: Karol Galba (Czechoslovakia)

20 October 1968 Summer Olympics Quarter-finals	Japan	3–1	France	Mexico City, Mexico
12:00 UTC–6	Kamamoto 27', 59'; Watanabe 70'	Report	Teamboueon 32'	Stadium: Azteca Stadium; Referee: Seyoum Tarekegn (Ethiopia)

== 1970s ==
=== 1971 ===
12 May 1972 Summer Olympics qualification First round	Iceland	0–0	France	Reykjavík, Iceland
20:00 UTC		Report		Stadium: Laugardalsvöllur; Attendance: 5,722; Referee: Kåre Sirevåg (Norway)

16 May 1972 Summer Olympics qualification First round	France	1–0	Iceland	Paris, France
20:30 UTC+1	Hallet 52'	Report		Stadium: Stade Jean-Bouin; Attendance: 1,151; Referee: Robert Schaut (Belgium)

3 November 1972 Summer Olympics qualification Second round	Soviet Union	5–1	France	Yerevan, Soviet Union
	Zanazanyan 12'; Andreasyan 21', 29'; Ishtoyan 36'; Greshchak 51'	Report	Riefa 69'

8 December 1972 Summer Olympics qualification Second round	France	5–1	Austria	Paris, France
	Riefa (?); Tonnel (?); Collinet (?)	Report	Radovics (?)

=== 1972 ===
12 April 1972 Summer Olympics qualification Second round	Austria	0–3	France	Mannersdorf am Leithagebirge, Austria
		Report	Riefa 33'; Collinet 57', 70'

25 May 1972 Summer Olympics qualification Second round	France	1–3	Soviet Union	Paris, France
	Tonnel 59'	Report	Machaidze 42'; Blokhin 49', 87'

=== 1975 ===
12 November 1976 Summer Olympics qualification Group 4	Netherlands	2–3	France	Veendam, Netherlands
		Report

3 December 1976 Summer Olympics qualification Group 4	France	4–0	Romania	Blois, France
21:30	Fernandez 43'; Rouyer 65', 72', 80'	Report		Stadium: Stade des Allées Jean-Leroi; Attendance: 6,051; Referee: John Homewood (England)

=== 1976 ===
25 February 1976 Summer Olympics qualification Group 4	France	4–2	Netherlands	Caen, France
		Report

24 March 1976 Summer Olympics qualification Group 4	Romania	1–0	France	Bucharest, Romania
16:00	Bölöni 10'	Report		Stadium: Stadionul 23 August; Attendance: 40,000; Referee: Giorgos Katsoras (Greece)

19 July 1976 Summer Olympics Group B	France	4–1	Mexico	Ottawa, Canada
12:00 UTC–5	Schaer 14'; Baronchelli 33'; Rubio 78'; Amisse 90'	Report	Sánchez 81'	Stadium: Lansdowne Park; Attendance: 14,286; Referee: Ángel Coerezza (Argentina)

21 July 1976 Summer Olympics Group B	France	4–1	Guatemala	Sherbrooke, Canada
12:00 UTC–5	Platini 7', 86'; Amisse 41'; Schaer 82'	Report	Fion 58'	Stadium: Municipal Stadium; Attendance: 3,163; Referee: Jafar Namdar (Iran)

23 July 1976 Summer Olympics Group B	France	1–1	Israel	Montreal, Canada
12:00 UTC–5	Platini 80' (pen.)	Report	Peretz 75'	Stadium: Olympic Stadium; Attendance: 33,639; Referee: Ramón Barreto (Uruguay)

25 July 1976 Summer Olympics Quarter-finals	East Germany	4–0	France	Ottawa, Canada
12:00 UTC–5	Löwe 27'; Dörner 60' (pen.), 68' (pen.); Riediger 77'	Report		Stadium: Lansdowne Park; Attendance: 20,083; Referee: Alberto Michelotti (Italy)

=== 1979 ===
5 December 1980 Summer Olympics qualification Group 3	France	1–1	Spain	Montpellier, France
		Report

== 1980s ==
=== 1980 ===
20 February 1980 Summer Olympics qualification Group 3	Belgium	4–2	France	La Louvière, Belgium
		Report

19 March 1980 Summer Olympics qualification Group 3	France	3–1	Belgium	Limoges, France
		Report

23 April 1980 Summer Olympics qualification Group 3	Spain	3–1	France	Alicante, Spain
		Report

=== 1983 ===
23 March 1984 Summer Olympics qualification Group 4	Spain	0–1	France	Murcia, Spain
		Report	Xuereb 88'

23 April 1984 Summer Olympics qualification Group 4	France	2–0	Belgium	Clermont-Ferrand, France
	Xuereb (?)	Report

12 June Friendly	China	1–1	France	Beijing, China
		Report

15 June Friendly	China	0–2	France	Dalian, China
		Report

9 November 1984 Summer Olympics qualification Group 4	Belgium	1–1	France	Charleroi, Belgium
	Hoste 63'	Report	Xuereb 2'

=== 1984 ===
29 February 1984 Summer Olympics qualification Group 4	France	3–1	Spain	Épinal, France
	Cubaynes 26', 77' (pen.); Jeannol 75'	Report	Butragueno 10'

27 March 1984 Summer Olympics qualification Group 4 play-off	France	1–1	West Germany	Paris, France
	Xuereb 30'	Report	Schatzschneider 76'

17 April 1984 Summer Olympics qualification Group 4 play-off	West Germany	0–1	France	Bochum, West Germany
		Report	Lacombe 76'

14 July Friendly	France	1–1	Cameroon	Caen, France
		Report

29 July 1984 Summer Olympics Group A	France	2–2	Qatar	Annapolis, United States
19:30 UTC–5	Garande 43' Xuereb 61'	Report	Al-Muhannadi 55', 60'	Stadium: Navy–Marine Corps Memorial Stadium; Attendance: 29,240; Referee: Filho (Brazil)

31 July 1984 Summer Olympics Group A	Norway	1–2	France	Boston, United States
19:00 UTC–5	Ahlsen 33'	Report	Brisson 5', 56'	Stadium: Harvard Stadium; Attendance: 27,832; Referee: Roth (West Germany)

2 August 1984 Summer Olympics Group A	Chile	1–1	France	Annapolis, United States
19:00 UTC–5	Santis 9'	Report	Lemoult 50'	Stadium: Navy–Marine Corps Memorial Stadium; Attendance: 28,114; Referee: Keizer (Netherlands)

5 August 1984 Summer Olympics Quarter-finals	France	2–0	Egypt	Pasadena, United States
19:00 UTC–5	Xuereb 29', 52'	Report		Stadium: Rose Bowl; Attendance: 66,228; Referee: Cha (South Korea)

8 August 1984 Summer Olympics Semi-finals	France	4–2 (a.e.t.)	Yugoslavia	Pasadena, United States
18:15 UTC–5	Bijotat 7'; Jeannol 15'; Lacombe 96'; Xuereb 119'	Report	Cvetković 63'; Deverić 74'	Stadium: Rose Bowl; Attendance: 97,451; Referee: Ramírez (Mexico)

11 August 1984 Summer Olympics Gold medal match	France	2–0	Brazil	Pasadena, United States
19:00 UTC–5	Brisson 55'; Xuereb 60'	Report		Stadium: Rose Bowl; Attendance: 101,799; Referee: Keizer (Netherlands)

=== 1986 ===
18 November Friendly	France	1–1	East Germany	Bourges, France
		Report

=== 1987 ===
18 February Friendly	Morocco	1–1	France	Casablanca, Morocco
		Report

28 April 1988 Summer Olympics qualification Group C	France	0–2	Hungary	Aix-en-Provence, France
		Report	Vincze 14'; Plotár 62'

16 June 1988 Summer Olympics qualification Group C	Sweden	4–2	France	Malmö, Sweden
	Hellström (?); Forsberg (?); Engqvist (?)	Report	Cubaynes 8'; Roux 17'

11 August 1988 Summer Olympics qualification Group C	France	1–1	Republic of Ireland	Dunkerque, France
	Fernier 54'	Report	Larkin 17'

13 October 1988 Summer Olympics qualification Group C	Spain	1–2	France	Burgos, Spain
	Vázquez 18'	Report	Kombouaré 56'; Papin 76'

18 November 1988 Summer Olympics qualification Group C	Republic of Ireland	3–0	France	Phibsborough, Ireland
	Eccles 19'; Bennett 24', 59'	Report		Stadium: Dalymount Park

=== 1988 ===
23 March 1988 Summer Olympics qualification Group C	France	1–1	Spain	Le Havre, France
	Fernier 66'	Report	Vázquez 4'

27 April 1988 Summer Olympics qualification Group C	Hungary	2–2	France	Budapest, Hungary
	Katona (?); Fodor 59' (pen.)	Report	Roux 54'; Mege 56'

25 May 1988 Summer Olympics qualification Group C	France	1–2	Sweden	Lens, France
	Philippe Prieur 40'	Report	Peter Lönn (?); Michael Andersson (?)

== 1990s ==
=== 1996 ===
20 July 1996 Summer Olympics Group B	France	2–0	Australia	Miami, United States
18:30 UTC–5	Pires 11'; Maurice 74'	Report		Stadium: Orange Bowl; Attendance: 14,322; Referee: Ruscio (Argentina)

22 July 1996 Summer Olympics Group B	France	1–1	Spain	Orlando, United States
19:00 UTC–5	Legwinski 38'	Report	Óscar 85'	Stadium: Citrus Bowl; Attendance: 16,773; Referee: Un-Prasert (Thailand)

24 July 1996 Summer Olympics Group B	France	2–1	Saudi Arabia	Miami, United States
19:00 UTC–5	Maurice 20' (pen.); Sibierski 49'	Report	Anwar 26'	Stadium: Orange Bowl; Attendance: 4,615; Referee: Archundia (Mexico)

27 July 1996 Summer Olympics Quarter-finals	Portugal	2–1 (a.e.t.)	France	Miami, United States
18:00 UTC–5	Capucho 7'; Calado 105' (pen.)	Report	Maurice 49' (pen.)	Stadium: Orange Bowl; Attendance: 22,339; Referee: Collina (Italy)

== 2020s ==
=== 2021 ===
22 July 2020 Summer Olympics Group A	Mexico	4–1	France	Chōfu, Japan
17:00 UTC+9	Vega 47'; Córdova 55'; Antuna 80'; Aguirre 90+1'	Report	Gignac 69' (pen.)	Stadium: Tokyo Stadium; Referee: Chris Beath (Australia)

25 July 2020 Summer Olympics Group A	France	4–3	South Africa	Saitama, Japan
17:00 UTC+9	Gignac 57', 78', 86' (pen.); Savanier 90+2'	Report	Kodisang 53'; Makgopa 73'; Mokoena 82'	Stadium: Saitama Stadium 2002; Referee: Kevin Ortega (Peru)

28 July 2020 Summer Olympics Group A	France	0–4	Japan	Yokohama, Japan
20:30 UTC+9		Report	Kubo 27'; Sakai 34'; Miyoshi 70'; Maeda 90+1'	Stadium: International Stadium Yokohama; Referee: Iván Barton (El Salvador)

=== 2024 ===
22 March Friendly	France	3–2	Ivory Coast	Châteauroux, France
18:30 UTC+1	Doué 38', 84'; Odobert 72'	Report	A. Traoré 47'; Bamba 49'	Stadium: Stade Gaston-Petit; Attendance: 8,121; Referee: Vasilios Fotias (Greece)

25 March Friendly	France	2–2	United States	Montbéliard, France
21:05 UTC+1	Kalimuendo 27' (pen.); Diouf 79'	Report	Yow 86'; Cowell 89'	Stadium: Stade Auguste-Bonal; Referee: Juan Martínez Munuera (Spain)

4 July Friendly	France	4–1	Paraguay	Bayonne, France
21:15 UTC+2	Mateta 45', 51' (pen.); Kalimuendo 72'; Cherki 86'	Report	Salcedo 3'	Stadium: Stade Jean-Dauger; Attendance: 11,280; Referee: Daniel Schlager (Germany)

11 July Friendly	France	7–0	Dominican Republic	Toulon, France
21:15 UTC+2	Millot 19'; Lacazette 28', 48'; Olise 51', 56'; Akliouche 80'; Cherki 90'	Report		Stadium: Stade Mayol; Attendance: 5,880; Referee: Stefan Ebner (Austria)

17 July Friendly	France	1–1	Japan	Toulon, France
21:05 UTC+2	Olise 47'	Report	Fujita 25'	Stadium: Stade Mayol; Attendance: 11,896; Referee: Mohammad Usman Aslam (Norway)

24 July 2024 Summer Olympics Group A	France	3–0	United States	Marseille, France
21:00 UTC+2	Lacazette 61'; Olise 69'; Badé 85'	Report		Stadium: Stade de Marseille; Attendance: 48,721; Referee: Yael Falcón (Argentina)

27 July 2024 Summer Olympics Group A	France	1–0	Guinea	Nice, France
21:00 UTC+2	Sildillia 75'	Report		Stadium: Stade de Nice; Attendance: 25,965; Referee: Ilgiz Tantashev (Uzbekistan)

30 July 2024 Summer Olympics Group A	New Zealand	0–3	France	Marseille, France
19:00 UTC+2		Report	Mateta 19'; Doué 71'; Kalimuendo 74'	Stadium: Stade de Marseille; Attendance: 45,790; Referee: Katia García (Mexico)

2 August 2024 Summer Olympics Quarter-finals	France	1–0	Argentina	Bordeaux, France
21:00 UTC+2	Mateta 5'	Report		Stadium: Stade de Bordeaux; Attendance: 37,153; Referee: Ilgiz Tantashev (Uzbekistan)

5 August 2024 Summer Olympics Semi-finals	France	3–1 (a.e.t.)	Egypt	Décines-Charpieu, France
21:00 UTC+2	Mateta 83', 99'; Olise 108'	Report	Mahmoud Saber 62'	Stadium: Stade de Lyon; Attendance: 47,530; Referee: Saíd Martínez (Honduras)

9 August 2024 Summer Olympics Gold medal match	France	3–5 (a.e.t.)	Spain	Paris, France
18:00 UTC+2	Millot 11'; Akliouche 79'; Mateta 90+3' (pen.)	Report	F. López 18', 25'; Baena 28'; Camello 100', 120+1'	Stadium: Parc des Princes; Attendance: 44,260; Referee: Ramon Abatti (Brazil)
