= Football at the 1960 Summer Olympics – Men's Americas Qualifiers =

Tournament details
- Dates: 8 October 1959 – 30 April 1960
- Teams: 10

Tournament statistics
- Matches played: 20
- Goals scored: 84 (4.2 per match)
- Top scorer: (Argentina) Mario Desiderio (5 goals)

The Americas section of the 1960 Summer Olympics – Men's Football Qualifiers acted as qualifiers for the 1960 Summer Olympics football tournament, held in Italy, for national teams that are members of North America and South America.

== Entrants ==
Ten national teams entered qualification.

- Argentina
- Brazil
- Chile
- Colombia
- Mexico
- Netherlands Antilles
- Peru
- Suriname
- Uruguay
- United States

== Format ==
- First round: 10 teams played home-and-away over two legs. The five winners advanced to the second round.
- Second round: 5 teams which advanced from the first round play round-robin matches. The top three teams of the group qualified for the Summer Olympics.

== First round ==
=== Summary ===
Team 1	Agg.	Team 2	1st leg	2nd leg
Mexico	3–1	United States	2–0	1–1
Netherlands Antilles	3–6	Suriname	2–2	1–4
Chile	1–11	Argentina	1–5	0–6
Peru	9–2	Uruguay	6–0	3–2
Colombia	3–7	Brazil	2–0	1–7

=== Matches ===
8 October 1959

Mexico	2–0	United States
Díez 14'; Moreno 44'	Report

Estadio de la Ciudad Universitaria, Mexico City
Referee: Alvar Macis (Costa Rica)
22 November 1959

United States	1–1	Mexico
Murophy 8'	Report	Meza 80'

Estadio Rancho Ciénega, Los Angeles
Referee: Raymond Morgan (Canada

Mexico won 3–1 on aggregate and advanced to the second round.

25 October 1959

Netherlands Antilles	2–2	Suriname
Jansen 3'; Valerian 22'	Report	Niekoop 12'; Marcet 46'

Rifstadion, Willemstad
Referee: Harry Letnom (Suriname)
29 November 1959

Suriname	4–1	Netherlands Antilles
Lagadeau 20'; Foe A Man 25'; Beltrand 50' (o.g.); Niekoop (?)	Report	Dirksz 89'

Suriname Stadion, Paramaribo
Referee: Benito Jackson (Venezuela)

Suriname won 6–3 on aggregate and advanced to the second round.

16 December 1959

Chile	1–5	Argentina
Fuentes 57' (pen.)	Report	Bilardo 2'; Bonnano 21', 63'; Pérez 65'; Rodríguez 80'

Estadio Nacional, Santiago
Referee: Luis Ventre (Chile)
22 December 1959

Argentina	6–0	Chile
Bonnano 4', 85'; Heredia 32'; Basílico 42', 72'; Rodríguez 75'	Report

Estadio Jorge Alejandro Newbery, Buenos Aires
Referee: Carlos Robles (Chile)

Argentina won 11–1 on aggregate and advanced to the second round.

16 December 1959

Peru	6–0	Uruguay
Pasache 6', 23'; Nieri 27'; Altuna 46'; Ramírez 66', 86'	Report

Estadio Nacional, Lima
Referee: Erwin Hieger (Austria)
22 December 1959

Uruguay	2–3	Peru
Moreno 2'; Mocchi 74' (pen.)	Report	Altuna 20', 45' (pen.); Nieri 65'

Estadio Nacional, Lima
Referee: Erwin Hieger (Austria)

Peru won 9–2 on aggregate and advanced to the second round.

20 December 1959

Colombia	2–0	Brazil
Home 34', 55'	Report

Estadio Nemesio Camacho, Bogotá
Referee: Rodrigo Miranda (Mexico)
27 December 1959

Brazil	7–1	Colombia
China 18', 22', 50'; Manoelzinho 32', 57'; Germano 34'; Lombana 64' (o.g.)	Report	Manjarres 80'

Estádio Jornalista Mário Filho, Rio de Janeiro
Referee: Juan Brozzi (Argentina)

Brazil won 7–3 on aggregate and advanced to the second round.

== Second round ==
=== Standings ===
Pos	Team	Pld	W	D	L	GF	GA	GD	Pts	Qualification
1	Argentina	4	4	0	0	14	5	+9	8	Qualification for 1960 Summer Olympics
2	Peru (H)	4	3	0	1	7	3	+4	6	Qualification for 1960 Summer Olympics
3	Brazil	4	2	0	2	7	7	0	4	Qualification for 1960 Summer Olympics
4	Mexico	4	1	0	3	6	6	0	2	
5	Suriname	4	0	0	4	4	17	−13	0	

Source: RSSSF
(H) Hosts

=== Matches ===
16 April 1960

Argentina	6–2	Suriname
Wooter 25' (o.g.); Oleniak 35'; Rendo 50', 70'; Desiderio 73', 86'	Report	Niekoop 16'; Foe A Man 44'

Estadio Nacional, Lima
Referee: Erwin Hieger (Austria)
16 April 1960

Peru	1–0	Mexico
Gallardo 58'	Report

Estadio Nacional, Lima
Referee: Juan Brozzi (Argentina)

19 April 1960

Mexico	1–2	Brazil
Benítez 50'	Report	Bruno 1', 25'

Estadio Nacional, Lima
Referee: Erwin Hieger (Austria)
19 April 1960

Peru	3–1	Suriname
Gallardo 62', 87'; Altuna 79'	Report	Niekoop 43'

Estadio Nacional, Lima

21 April 1960

Mexico	4–0	Suriname
Ramírez 1'; Mercado 41'; Benítez 71'; Álvarez 89'	Report

Estadio Nacional, Lima
Referee: Juan Brozzi (Argentina)
21 April 1960

Argentina	3–1	Brazil
Desiderio 25', 36'; Oleniak 39'	Report	Jaburu 65'

Estadio Nacional, Lima
Referee: Erwin Hieger (Austria)

24 April 1960

Argentina	2–1	Peru
Desiderio 8', 88'	Report	Ramirez 81'

Estadio Nacional, Lima
Referee: Carlos Robles (Costa Rica)
27 April 1960

Suriname	1–4	Brazil
Foe A Man 8'	Report	Wooter 17' (o.g.); Jaburu 21'; Maranhão 40'; China 41'

Estadio Nacional, Lima
Referee: Erwin Hieger (Austria)

27 April 1960

Mexico	1–3	Argentina
Álvarez 31'	Report	De Ciancio 41'; Oleniak 52'; Rendo 75'

Estadio Nacional, Lima
Referee: Erwin Hieger (Austria)
30 April 1960

Peru	2–0	Brazil
Nonô 60' (o.g.); Altuna 85'	Report

Estadio Nacional, Lima
Referee: Juan Brozzi (Argentina)

== Qualified teams ==
The following three teams from the Americas qualified for the final tournament.

Team	Qualified as	Qualified on	Previous appearances in the Summer Olympics
Argentina	Second round winners	24 April 1960	1 (1928)
Peru	Second round runners-up	24 April 1960	1 (1936)
Brazil	Second round third place	27 April 1960	1 (1952)

== Goalscorers ==
There were 84 goals scored in 20 matches, for an average of 4.2 goals per match.

Two own goals were scored throughout the tournament.

5 goals

- (Argentina national football team) Mario Desiderio

4 goals

- (Argentina national football team) Roberto Bonnano
- (Brazil national football team) China
- (Peru national football team) Gerardo Altuna

3 goals

- (Argentina national football team) Juan Carlos Oleniak
- (Brazil national football team) Bruno
- (Brazil national football team) Manoelzinho
- (Peru national football team) Alberto Ramírez
- (Suriname national football team) August Foe A Man

2 goals

- (Argentina national football team) Domingo Rodríguez
- (Brazil national football team) Jaburu
- (Brazil national football team) Maranhão
- (Chile national football team) Héctor Fuentes
- (Colombia national football team) Fernando Home
- (Mexico national football team) Francisco Benítez
- (Mexico national football team) Juan Manuel Álvarez
- (Mexico national football team) Joaquín Ramírez
- (Peru national football team) Nicolas Nieri
- (Peru national football team) Luis Pasache
- (Peru national football team) Alberto Gallardo
- (Suriname national football team) Arnold Niekoop
- (Uruguay national football team) Roberto Mocchi

1 goal

- (Argentina national football team) Carlos Bilardo
- (Argentina national football team) Héctor Heredia
- (Argentina national football team) Raúl Pérez
- (Argentina national football team) Pedro De Ciancio
- (Argentina national football team) José Díaz
- (Argentina national football team) Alberto Rendo
- (Chile national football team) Guillermo Quiroga
- (Chile national football team) Osvaldo Rojas
- (Colombia national football team) Manuel Manjarrés
- (Mexico national football team) Sigifredo Mercado
- (Mexico national football team) Fernando Meza
- (Netherlands Antilles national football team) Hilario Beltrand
- (Netherlands Antilles national football team) Julio Jansen
- (Netherlands Antilles national football team) Romualdo Valerian
- (Peru national football team) Teodoro Luna
- (Suriname national football team) Leo Marcet
- (Uruguay national football team) Miguel Moreno
- (United States men's national soccer team) Ed Murphy

1 own goal

- (Brazil national football team) Nonô (against Peru)
- (Suriname national football team) Rudolfo Dirksz (against Netherlands Antilles)
