= Football at the 1960 Summer Olympics – Men's European Qualifiers – Group 6 =

The 1960 Summer Olympics football qualification – Europe Group 6 was one of the seven European groups in the Summer Olympics football qualification tournament to decide which teams would qualify for the Football at the 1960 Summer Olympics finals tournament in Italy. Group 6 consisted of three teams: France, Luxembourg and Switzerland. The teams played against each other home-and-away in a round-robin format. The group winners, France, qualified directly for the Summer Olympics football finals.

== Standings ==
Pos	Team	Pld	W	D	L	GF	GA	GD	Pts	Qualification	France	Luxembourg	Switzerland
1	France	4	3	0	1	7	6	+1	6	Qualification for 1960 Summer Olympics	—	1–0	1–0
2	Luxembourg	4	1	2	1	7	6	+1	4		5–3	—	0–0
3	Switzerland	4	0	2	2	3	5	−2	2		1–2	2–2	—

Source: RSSSF

== Matches ==
11 November 1959
14:30 UTC+1

France	1–0	Luxembourg
Quédec 37'	Report

Parc des Sports, Dijon
Attendance:
Referee: Antonio Moriconi (Italy)

22 November 1959

Switzerland	1–2	France
Grand 43'	Report	Quédec 19'; Coinçon 87'

27 March 1960
15:00 UTC+1

Luxembourg	0–0	Switzerland
	Report

Stade Municipal, Luxembourg City
Attendance: 2,500
Referee: Tage Sørensen (Denmark)

10 April 1960

Luxembourg	5–3	France
Brenner 5' (pen.); Theis 7'; Kunnert 14'; Pilot 53'; Konter 75'	Report	Arab 15'; Quédec 40', 55'

Stade Municipal, Luxembourg City
Attendance:

13 April 1960
20:15 UTC+1

Switzerland	2–2	Luxembourg
Gottardi 18', 56'	Report	Kunnert 72'; Brenner 87'

St. Jakob Stadion, Basel
Attendance: 6,500
Referee: Milan Fencl (Czechoslovakia)

1 May 1960

France	1–0	Switzerland
Aigony 37'	Report

== Goalscorers ==
There were 17 goals scored in 6 matches, for an average of 2.83 goals per match.

4 goals

- (France Olympic football team) Yvon Quédec

2 goals

- (Luxembourg national football team) Erny Brenner
- (Luxembourg national football team) Joseph Kunnert
- (Switzerland Olympic football team) Vittore Gottardi

1 goal

- (France Olympic football team) Aigony
- (France Olympic football team) Ahmed Arab
- (France Olympic football team) Gérard Coinçon
- (Luxembourg national football team) Marcel Theis
- (Luxembourg national football team) Louis Pilot
- (Luxembourg national football team) François Konter
- (Switzerland Olympic football team) Jean-Paul Grand
