= Peru Olympic football team =

National association football team

Peru Olympic
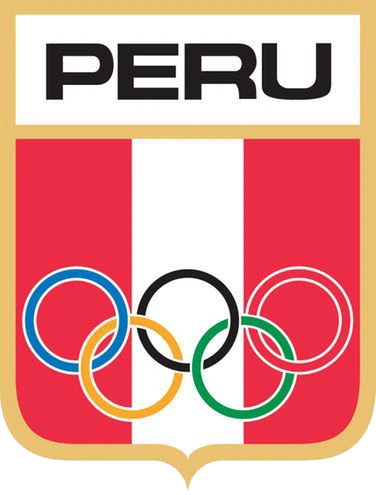
- Nickname(s): La Blanquirroja (The White and Red); Los Incas (The Incas)
- Association: Peruvian Football Federation (FPF)
- Confederation: CONMEBOL (South America)
- Captain: Emilio Saba
- Home stadium: Estadio Nacional
- FIFA code: PER
First colours	Second colours

First international
- Peru 6–0 Uruguay (Lima, Peru; 16 December 1959)

Biggest win
- Peru 6–0 Uruguay (Lima, Peru; 16 December 1959)

Biggest defeat
- Paraguay 7–1 Peru (Asunción, Paraguay; 7 February 1992)

Olympics
- Appearances: 1 (first in 1960)
- Best result: Round 1 (1960)

Pan American Games
- Appearances: 2 (first in 2015)
- Best result: Group stage (2015, 2019)
Medal record
CONMEBOL Pre-Olympic Tournament
Silver medal – second place	1960 Peru	NA
Bronze medal – third place	1964 Peru	NA
Bronze medal – third place	1980 Colombia	NA

Peru Olympic football team (also known as Peru under-23, Peru U23) represents Peru in international football competitions in multi-sport events such as the Olympic Games and the Pan American Games. The selection is limited to players under the age of 23, except three overage players. The team is controlled by the Peruvian Football Federation (FPF). Peru has participated in two Olympic football tournaments and two Pan American football tournaments under this category.

The squad requirements to participate in the Summer Olympics has changed multiple times through the history of the competition. Since 1992, squads for the Summer Olympics have been restricted to three players over the age of 23 with similar changes occurring in the Pan American Games in 1999. The achievements of such teams are not usually included in the statistics of the international team.

== History ==
=== 1936 Summer Olympics ===
Peru played in the 1936 edition of the Olympic Games in Berlin, but it was with the A team.

=== 1960 Summer Olympics ===
After 24 years, Peru qualified once again for the football tournament at the 1960 Summer Olympics held in Rome with their U-23 football team under the technical direction of György Orth. It defeated Uruguay in the two-leg play-off round by 6–0 in Lima and then by 3–2 in Montevideo. The five play-off winners faced each other in a special tournament held in Lima in April 1960. Los Incas finished third ahead of Mexico and Suriname and thus qualified for the tournament in Rome.

In their first match of the tournament, Peru started out with a surprise as Ángel Uribe scored a 1st-minute goal against France. Peru would go on to lose 2–1 against the French, and were later beaten by Hungary in a result of 6–2, with only Alberto Ramírez scoring goals for the Blanquirroja. Their last match was against India, which was a comfortable 3–1 score in favor of the Peruvians with goals by Nicolas Nieri and Tomás Iwasaki.

Peru has not qualified again to the tournament since 1960, but were close to qualifying again in the 1964 and 1980 CONMEBOL Men Pre-Olympic Tournaments, finishing in third place on both occasions. During the 1964 Pre-Olympic tournament, the Estadio Nacional disaster occurred, in which more than 300 people lost their lives.

=== 2015 Pan American Games ===
An official multi-sport event squad was created once again for the first time since the 1960 Summer Olympics in 2015 for Peru's first participation in the Pan American football tournament held in Canada. Peru had qualified to this tournament once before in 2007. CONMEBOL only accepted to play with Under-17 teams that year (qualified through the 2007 South American Under-17 Football Championship), since the Under-20 teams had to participate in the U-20 World Cup at the same time. Peru declined to participate because the Under-17 team preferred to play friendlies in Asia in preparation of the U-17 World Cup, so Bolivia took its place.

Thus Peru qualified once again in 2015 via the 2015 South American U-20 Championship. That year the top three teams in the final stage of the tournament qualified to the 2016 Olympic tournament and the bottom three to the 2015 Pan American tournament of which Peru finished 5th.

The team's first game was against Panama on July 12. Panama put themselves ahead via Jorman Aguilar at the beginning of the first half. Peru then equalized the score through a goal by Gonzalo Maldonado twelve minutes later. The deadlock was broken in the 90th minute when Elsar Rodas committed a foul against the Panamanian Cecilio Waterman who was awarded a penalty that was converted by Fidel Escobar for a final score of 2–1. The second game was against Brazil with a final score of 4–0 with goals of Luan, Clayton, Rômulo, and Dodô. This was enough to mathematically eliminate Peru out of the tournament before its third game against Canada. During that game Elsar Rodas scored the first and then Manjrekar James scored an own goal in the second half for a final 0–2 against the locals.

=== 2019 Pan American Games ===
Peru qualified to the 2019 tournament as host. It lost its first game by 2–0 against Uruguay. Peru's second game was against Honduras who scored two goals in injury time of the game for a 2–2 draw. Peru's two goals were scored by Kevin Quevedo and Jordan Guivin. On the last match day, Uruguay defeated Honduras by 3–0 which would qualify Peru the second round of the tournament if it was able to defeat Jamaica. In the end Jamaica defeated Peru with two goals in the second half, relegating Peru to the 7th place match against Ecuador. There, a final score of 1–1 forced both teams to decide the match in penalties which Peru won by 4–2 to finish 7th of eight teams.

== Bolivarian Games ==
The Bolivarian Games (Spanish: Juegos Bolivarianos) are a regional multi-sport event held in honor of Simón Bolívar, and organized by the Bolivarian Sports Organization (Organización Deportiva Bolivariana, ODEBO). The games' football tournament has changed category multiple times during the history of the competition with full national teams participating only on the first edition in 1938. At times the competition was limited to only amateur sides or youth teams:

- Between 1947 and 1981, the tournament was contested by amateur teams.
- In 1985 the tournament was played by Under-20 sides.
- Since 1993 the football tournament is played by U-17 national teams.

== Results and fixtures ==
Win Draw Loss Fixture

== Coaching history ==
Source consulted: Depor.com

- (Hungary) György Orth (1960)
- (Brazil) Marinho Rodrigues (1964)
- (Peru) Roberto Drago (1968)
- (Hungary) Lajos Baróti (1971)
- (Brazil) Murilho Carvalho (1976)
- (Peru) Guillermo Guerrero (1980)
- (Peru) Fernando Cuéllar (1987, 1992)
- (Peru) Freddy Ternero (1996)
- (Peru) Teddy Cardama (2000)
- (Brazil) Paulo Autuori (2004)
- (Peru) Víctor Rivera (2015)
- (Peru) Nolberto Solano (2019–2020)
- (Peru) Flavio Maestri (2022)
- (Peru) José del Solar (2023–2024)

== Players ==
=== Current ===
The following 23 players were called up for the 2024 CONMEBOL Pre-Olympic Tournament from 20 January to 11 February.

Caps and goals are correct as of 24 January 2024, after the match against Argentina.

No.	Pos.	Player	Date of birth (age)	Caps	Goals	Club
21	GK	Jeferson Nolasco	24 January 2002 (age 24)	4	0	(Peruvian Football Federation) Cienciano
1	GK	Diego Romero	17 August 2001 (age 25)	2	0	(Peruvian Football Federation) Universitario
12	GK	Jhefferson Rodriguez	13 March 2000 (age 26)	0	0	(Peruvian Football Federation) Universitario
7	DF	Emilio Saba (captain)	26 March 2001 (age 25)	6	1	(Peruvian Football Federation) Mannucci
14	DF	Marco Huamán	25 September 2002 (age 24)	6	0	(Peruvian Football Federation) Alianza Lima
4	DF	Erick Noriega	22 July 2001 (age 25)	5	0	(Peruvian Football Federation) Comerciantes Unidos
15	DF	Julinho Astudillo	7 January 2005 (age 21)	4	0	(Peruvian Football Federation) Universitario
13	DF	Mathias Llontop	22 May 2002 (age 24)	4	0	(Peruvian Football Federation) Carlos A. Mannucci
3	DF	Alejandro Pósito	5 August 2005 (age 21)	2	0	(Peruvian Football Federation) Sporting Cristal
2	DF	Anderson Villacorta	25 July 2005 (age 21)	2	0	(Mexican Football Federation) Zacatecas
5	DF	Rafael Lutiger	3 July 2001 (age 25)	2	0	(Peruvian Football Federation) Sporting Cristal
24	DF	Brian Arias	2 September 2009 (age 17)	1	0	(Peruvian Football Federation) Alianza Lima
8	MF	Álvaro Rojas	12 March 2005 (age 21)	6	0	(Peruvian Football Federation) Universitario
6	MF	Ian Wisdom	14 September 2005 (age 21)	5	0	(Peruvian Football Federation) Sporting Cristal
23	MF	Franchesco Flores	15 June 2001 (age 25)	4	1	(Peruvian Football Federation) Universidad César Vallejo
16	MF	Eslyn Correa	29 June 2005 (age 21)	2	0	(Peruvian Football Federation) Cusco FC
18	MF	Alessandro Burlamaqui	18 February 2002 (age 24)	2	0	(Royal Spanish Football Federation) Intercity
17	FW	Bassco Soyer	17 October 2006 (age 20)	2	0	(Peruvian Football Federation) Alianza Lima
20	FW	Juan Pablo Goicochea	12 January 2005 (age 21)	6	1	(Argentine Football Association) Platense
9	FW	Víctor Guzmán	25 March 2006 (age 20)	5	3	(Peruvian Football Federation) Alianza Lima
19	FW	Guillermo Larios	11 May 2002 (age 24)	4	0	(Peruvian Football Federation) Alianza Atlético
11	FW	Diether Vásquez	6 June 2003 (age 23)	3	0	(Andorran Football Federation) UE Santa Coloma

=== Recent ===
The players listed below were not included in the current squad, but have been called up by Peru in the last 12 months.

- Overage players are denoted with a *

Pos.	Player	Date of birth (age)	Caps	Goals	Club	Latest call-up
^{INJ} Withdrew due to injury^{PRE} Preliminary squad^{SUS} Suspended^{WD} Withdrew from the squad

== Competitive record ==
=== Olympic Games ===
Olympic Games record
Year	Round	Position	Pld	W	D	L	GF	GA	Squad
From 1896 to 1956	See Peru A team								
(Italy) 1960	Round 1	11th	3	1	0	2	6	9	Squad
From 1964 to 1980	Did not qualify								
(United States) 1984	Withdrew								
From 1988 to 2024	Did not qualify								
(United States) 2028	To be determined								
(Australia) 2032	To be determined								
Total	Round 1	1/17	3	1	0	2	6	9	—

=== Pan American Games ===
Pan American Games record
Year	Round	Position	Pld	W	D	L	GF	GA	Squad
From 1951 to 2003	Did not qualify								
(Brazil) 2007	Withdrew								
(Mexico) 2011	Did not qualify								
(Canada) 2015	Round 1	6th	3	1	0	2	3	6	Squad
(Peru) 2019	7th place	7th	4	0	2	2	3	7	Squad
(Chile) 2023	Did not qualify								
(Peru) 2027	Qualified as hosts								
(Paraguay) 2031	To be determined								
Total	6th place	2/19	7	1	2	4	6	13	—

=== CONMEBOL Pre-Olympic Tournament ===
CONMEBOL Pre-Olympic Tournament record
Year	Round	Position	Pld	W	D	L	GF	GA
(Peru) 1960	Runners-up	2nd	6	5	0	1	16	5
(Peru) 1964	Third place	3rd	4	2	1	1	6	2
(Colombia) 1968	Group stage	6th	3	0	2	1	2	3
(Colombia) 1971	Fourth place	4th	7	3	3	1	8	4
(Brazil) 1976	Group stage	6th	5	1	0	4	3	11
(Colombia) 1980	Third place	3rd	6	3	1	2	9	7
(Ecuador) 1984	Withdrew							
(Bolivia) 1987	Group stage	9th	4	0	1	3	1	5
(Paraguay) 1992	Group stage	7th	4	1	0	3	6	13
(Argentina) 1996	Group stage	9th	4	1	0	3	7	13
(Brazil) 2000	Group stage	5th	4	2	1	1	10	8
(Chile) 2004	Group stage	7th	4	1	1	2	6	9
(Colombia) 2020	Group stage	9th	4	1	0	3	4	6
(Venezuela) 2024	Group stage	9th	4	1	0	3	1	6
Total	Runners-up	13/14	59	21	10	28	79	92

=== Bolivarian Games ===
Bolivarian Games record
Year	Round	Position	GP	W	D*	L	GS	GA
(Colombia) 1938	See Peru A team							
(Peru) 1947-48	Gold medal	1/3	2	2	0	0	2	0
(Venezuela) 1951	Bronze medal	3/5	4	2	1	1	6	4
(Colombia) 1961	Gold medal	1/4	6	6	0	0	13	6
From 1965 to 1970	Did not enter							
(Panama) 1973	Gold medal	1/4	6	4	1	1	17	3
(Bolivia) 1977	Bronze medal	3/3	4	0	2	2	3	5
(Venezuela) 1981	Gold medal	1/4	3	2	1	0	6	2
(Ecuador) 1985	See Peru U-20 team							
Since 1993	See Peru U-17 team							
Total	Gold medal	6/8	25	16	5	4	47	20

== Honours ==
- CONMEBOL Pre-Olympic Tournament
  - Runners-up (1): 1960
  - Third place (2): 1964, 1980

== See also ==
- Peru national football team
- Peru national under-20 football team
- Peru national under-17 football team
