= Carlos Burella =

Peruvian footballer (1943–2021)

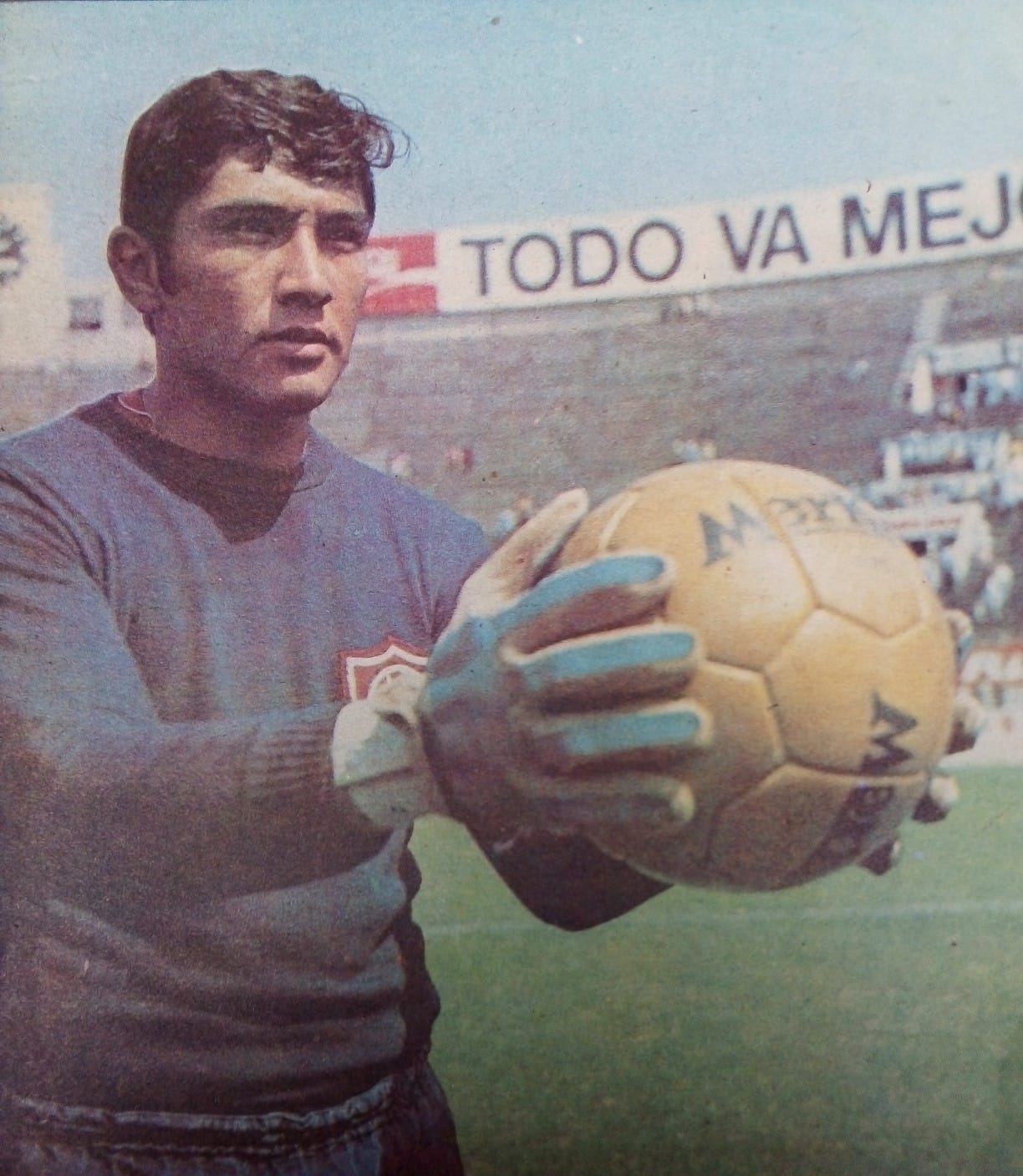
- Burella in 1973

Personal information
- Full name: Carlos Burella Higashi
- Date of birth: 12 July 1943
- Place of birth: Lima, Lima Province, Peru
- Date of death: 31 August 2021 (aged 78)
- Position: Goalkeeper

Youth career
- ???–1956: Academia José Soriano
- 1957–1958: Centro Iqueño

Senior career*
Years	Team	Apps	(Gls)
1959–1960	Mariscal Sucre		
1961–1962	Ciclista Lima		
1965–1964	Sporting Cristal		
1965	Defensor Lima		
1966–1968	Universitario de Deportes		
1969	Juan Aurich		
1969	Universitario de Deportes		
1970	Defensor Lima		
1971	Deportivo Quito		
1972–1974	Defensor Lima		
1975	Atlético Chalaco		
1976	Defensor Lima		

International career
1960, 1972	Peru	2	(0)
- * Club domestic league appearances and goals

Carlos Burella Higashi (12 July 1943 – 31 August 2021) was a Peruvian footballer. Nicknamed "Loco", he played as a goalkeeper for Defensor Lima and Universitario de Deportes throughout the 1960s and the 1970s. He was frequently compared to Argentine goalkeeper Hugo Gatti due to how his style of play would frequently emulate him. He also briefly represented Peru on two occasions in 1972.

== Club career ==
He would begin his career within the Academia José Soriano until he was transferred to the youth sector of Centro Iqueño which was under the management of Roberto Scarone in 1957 and later by Miguel Ortega in 1958. He then played for Mariscal Sucre in 1959 where the club would be promoted for the 1960 Peruvian Primera División where he would make his debut at the age of 17 under manager Juan Bulnes. From 1961 to 1962, he played for Ciclista Lima under managers Alejandro Heredia Miranda, José Chiarella and Roberto Drago. In 1963, he would play for Sporting Cristal under Didi before playing for Defensor Lima in 1965.

He would then begin to play for Universitario de Deportes in 1966. Throughout his tenure with the club, he was a part of the winning squads for the 1966, 1967 and 1969 editions of the tournament. Also in 1969, he would briefly play for Juan Aurich to play in the 1969 Copa Libertadores where he would play in the matches against Universidad Católica before returning to Universitario de Deportes. After briefly returning to play for Defensor Lima for the 1970 Torneo Descentralizado, he would go abroad to Ecuador to play for Deportivo Quito in the 1971 Campeonato Ecuatoriano de Fútbol Serie A. He then returned to Defensor Lima from 1972 and 1974 and witness the club's first title for the 1973 Torneo Descentralizado. Following a brief tenure at Atlético Chalaco in 1975, he would retire with Defensor Lima in 1976.

== International career ==
Following Peru's qualification for the 1960 Summer Olympics, Burella was part of the 30-man preliminary roster for the tournament. However, he would not be selected for the final roster as Carlos Salinas and Herminio Campos would be selected as the goalkeepers. He would later be called up to play for Peru in 1972 in two friendlies in a 3–2 victory against Mexico on 9 August and a 0–2 loss against Argentina on 25 October as part of a project by manager Roberto Scarone in determining players that were worthy to participate in the upcoming 1974 FIFA World Cup qualifiers.

== Managerial career ==
Burella had a brief tenure as an instructor for youth goalkeepers beginning in 1982 with Deportivo Municipal, before teaching with the senior and U23 teams of Peru in 1983 and 1985 respectively, Sport Boys in 1987, the pre-olympic team for the 1987 CONMEBOL Pre-Olympic Tournament, Lawn Tennis in 1989 and San Agustín in 1990.
