= Geronimi =

Geronimi or Géronimi is a French surname. Notable people with the surname include:

- Clyde Geronimi (1901–1989), American animation director
- Charles Géronimi (1895–1918), French footballer
- Georges Géronimi (1892–1994), French footballer
