= Ray Morgan =

Ray Morgan may refer to:

- Ray Morgan (baseball), American baseball player
- Ray Morgan (announcer), American radio and television announcer
- Ray Morgan (curler), American curler
- Ray Morgan (singer), British singer

== See also ==
- Raymond C. Morgan, American football and basketball coach
- Raymar Morgan, American basketball player
