= Jean Rigal =

French footballer (1890–1979)

Personal information
- Full name: Louis Jean Julien Rigal
- Date of birth: 12 December 1890
- Place of birth: Boulogne-Billancourt, France
- Date of death: 5 November 1979 (aged 88)
- Place of death: 6th arrondissement of Paris, France
- Height: 1.72 m (5 ft 8 in)
- Position: Midfielder

Senior career*
Years	Team	Apps	(Gls)
1908–1914	AF Garenne-Colombes		

International career
1909–1912	France	11	(1)

Managerial career
- 1949–1950: France
- 1960: France Olympic
- * Club domestic league appearances and goals

Louis Jean Julien Rigal (12 December 1890 – 5 November 1979) was a French footballer who played as a midfielder for AF Garenne-Colombes and the French national team between 1908 and 1912.

He was a member of France's selection committee from 1922 until 1936, and an assistant coach from 1949 and 1956, co-directing a total of 132 matches. He later led the French Olympic team in the 1960 Olympic Games.

== Playing career ==
Born in Boulogne-Billancourt on 12 December 1890, Jean Rigal first practiced cross country and athletics at ES Colombes before starting his football career at Association Fraternelle de la Garenne-Colombes (AFGC), founded by Abbé Marchand in 1906, doing so purely for the pleasure of it, unrelated to official status, since the AFGC could not claim to win any championship. Faithful to the entirely amateur spirit that reigned in the "patros", he only knew this one club, just like the Géronimi brothers (Georges and Charles). A tireless midfielder, the press once stated that he "does an enormous job, coming back to rescue his overwhelmed backs, and pushing his forwards to attack", being also praised for "distributing the game very well", despite being slow.

Despite being one of the best players from the patronages around 1906–08, Rigal was not called up for the French national team because the coach of the time, the northerner André Billy of USFSA, preferred players from the Nord. When the USFSA was replaced by Simon's CFI, however, he was immediately called up for the first ten matches of the CFI reign, a streak that lasted from May 1909 until April 1911, all friendlies, scoring only once, on his debut against Belgium, from a corner kick to help his side to a 2–5 victory. In his eleventh and final cap against Belgium on 28 January 1912, which ended in a 1–1 draw, thus finishing his international career with 9 defeats and 2 draws.

== Military career ==
In 1911, during his mandatory military service, Rigal obtained his balloonist's license, thus fighting in the First World War in a "captive" observation balloon, whose mission was to locate enemy artillery batteries. At the outbreak of the Second World War in 1939, the 48-year-old Rigal was mobilized and assigned to a training center for balloonists.

== Managerial career ==
In 1922, Rigal became a member of the selection committee of the French national team, having accepted an offer from Henri Delaunay, secretary of the FFF, who convinced him to take the role by telling him that he did not had "to come to the committee meetings if he had something else to do". The selection committee, who was made up of five members, was naturally not always in agreement, but Jean Rigal often pulled in the same direction as the committee's head, Gaston Barreau, with whom he had played in the national team on two occasions. Remaining on the committee when it was reduced to three members in 1930, he did not hesitate to leave when the FFF appointed Barreau as France's sole selector in 1936. Between July 1922 and 1936, he co-directed a total of 86 matches.

Rigal was then assigned to the newly created French amateur team, which was set to play at the Olympic Games, an event that demanded an entirely amateur spirit. In December 1937, the journalists of Le Miroir des Sports described him as the "Barreau" of France B, and three months later, in March 1938, those same journalists described him as the "second selector of the federation", having assisted Barreau during a training session of the French team in preparation for the 1938 FIFA World Cup in France. He remained in charge of the B team until August 1949, when he took his place in a resurrected selection committee, remaining there for eight years, until he resigned in March 1957, co-directed a further 46 matches for a total of 132.

Rigal remained at the helm of the amateur team, but due to the growing trend of professionalism, he decided to build the amateur squad from the footballers who were carrying out their mandatory military service at the Bataillon de Joinville. Notably, he led them in the football tournament of the 1960 Olympic Games in Italy.

== Death ==
Rigal died in the 6th arrondissement of Paris on 5 November 1979, at the age of 88.

== Career statistics ==
France score listed first, score column indicates score after each Rigal goal.

List of international goals scored by Jean Rigal
No.	Date	Venue	Opponent	Score	Result	Competition
1	9 May 1909	Stade du Vivier d'Oie, Uccle, Belgium	Belgium	2–5	2–5	Friendly
