= Max Samper =

French footballer (1938–2026)

Personal information
- Date of birth: 29 June 1938
- Place of birth: Ganties, France
- Date of death: 17 May 2026 (aged 87)
- Place of death: Saint-Gaudens, Haute-Garonne, France
- Height: 1.75 m (5 ft 9 in)
- Position: Midfielder

Senior career*
| Years | Team | Apps | (Gls) |
| 1957–1960 | Racing Paris | | |
| 1960–1961 | Lille | | |
| 1961–1962 | Racing Paris | | |
| 1962–1963 | CA Paris | | |
| 1964–1965 | AS Brignoles | | |
| 1965–1968 | AS Angoulême | | |
| 1969–1973 | Vélo Sport Chartres | | |

International career
| 1960 | France Olympic | 1 | (0) |

Managerial career
- 1969–1973: Vélo Sport Chartes
- * Club domestic league appearances and goals

Max Samper (29 June 1938 – 17 May 2026) was a French footballer who played as a midfielder. He competed in the men's tournament at the 1960 Summer Olympics.

== Career ==
Samper made over 80 appearances for AS Angoulême between 1965 and 1968 and helped the club reach the semi-finals of the 1966–67 Coupe de France.

He was selected in France’s squad for the 1960 Olympics, playing the second game against India as France was eliminated in the group stage.

== Death ==
Samper died on 17 May 2026 in Saint-Gaudens, Haute-Garonne, at the age of 87.
