= Zoo d'Amnéville =

- Entrance of the zoo in Amnéville
- Interactive map of Zoo d'Amnéville
- 49°14′46″N 6°08′21″E
- Date opened: June 28, 1986
- Location: Amnéville, Moselle, France
- Land area: 18 hectares (44 acres)
- No. of animals: 1500
- No. of species: 360
- Memberships: WAZA
- Website: zoo-amneville.com

The Amneville Zoo is a French zoological park of the Grand Est region, located in the Moselle valley, between Metz and the Luxembourg border, in the town of Amnéville. About 1,500 animals of 360 species are presented on 18 hectares. It is headed by its founder, Michel Louis, since 1986. Formed as a worker cooperative, it is owned by its employees-cooperators.

Within the European Association of Zoos and Aquaria (EAZA), it participates in several European Endangered Species Programme. It is also one of the few zoos in France to present gorillas and orangutans.

With an average of 629,000 visitors per year between 2011 and 2015, it is one of the ten most popular zoos in France.
