= Daniel Xuereb =

French footballer (born 1959)

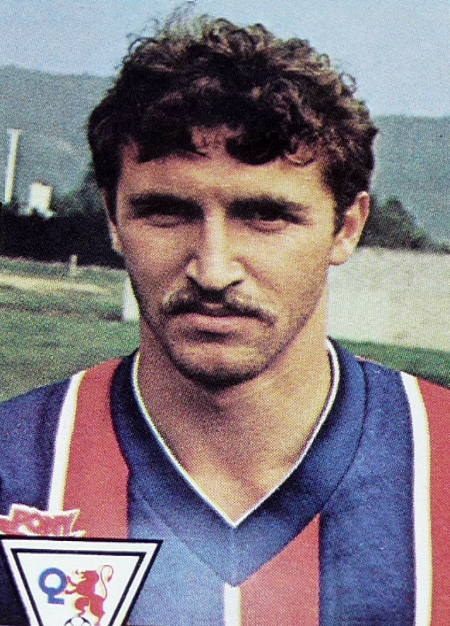
- Xuereb in 1978

Personal information
- Date of birth: 29 May 1959 (age 67)
- Place of birth: Gardanne, Bouches-du-Rhône, France
- Height: 1.76 m (5 ft 9 in)
- Position: Forward

Senior career*
Years	Team	Apps	(Gls)
1977–1981	Lyon	95	(23)
1981–1986	Lens	164	(39)
1986–1989	Paris Saint-Germain	80	(20)
1989–1991	Montpellier	65	(20)
1991–1992	Marseille	19	(3)
1992–1993	Toulon	20	(1)
Total		443	(106)

International career
1981–1989	France	8	(1)
1984	France Olympic	6	(5)

Managerial career
- 2008–2009: Aix
- * Club domestic league appearances and goals

Daniel Xuereb (born 29 May 1959) is a French football manager and former forward. His most notable achievement was a gold medal at the 1984 Summer Olympics, where he finished as joint top scorer with five goals.

Xuereb also holds the distinction of being the sole Olympic gold medalist and first FIFA World Cup representative of the Maltese diaspora, as his paternal grandfather hailed from Malta. Additionally, when he appeared at México '86, his last name provided the final letter needed for the World Cup to have at least one player listed for each character of the Latin alphabet; 'X' was the last character needed to complete this list.

== Honours ==
Montpellier

- Coupe de France: 1989–90

Marseille

- Division 1: 1991–92
