= August Foe A Man =

Surinamese footballer (1933–2022)

Personal information
- Full name: August Frederick Foe A Man
- Date of birth: 24 April 1933
- Place of birth: Paramaribo, Dutch Guiana
- Date of death: 31 January 2022 (aged 88)
- Position: Midfielder

Senior career*
Years	Team	Apps	(Gls)
1950–1960	Sonny Boys		

International career
1958–1960	Suriname	11+	(6+)
- * Club domestic league appearances and goals

August Frederick Foe A Man (24 April 1933 – 31 January 2022) was a Surinamese footballer who played as a midfielder.

== Career ==
Foe A Man started his career at the age of 12, playing barefoot at the Plein van 12 mei. Three years later, he continued to play barefoot at the Mr. Bronsplein sport complex. In 1950, he joined Sonny Boys at the age of 17, and later finished as the top goal scorer of the SVB Eerste Divisie, then the top division of Suriname, in 1959.

In 1960, he represented the Suriname national team at the 1960 CCCF Championship, where he scored twice in a 2–0 win against Cuba, and in qualification for the 1960 Summer Olympics, with the RSSSF including him in their unofficial best XI. Later that year, he scored in a friendly against the Netherlands.

== Death ==
Foe A Man died on 31 January 2022, at the age of 88.
