= Raymond Baratto =

French footballer (1934-2022

Personal information
- Date of birth: 23 January 1934
- Place of birth: Amnéville, Moselle, France
- Date of death: 16 April 2022 (aged 88)
- Place of death: Amnéville, Moselle, France
- Position: Midfielder

Senior career*
Years	Team	Apps	(Gls)
1955–1961	Reims		
1961–1962	Lille OSC		

International career
1960	France Olympic football team	2	(0)
- * Club domestic league appearances and goals

Raymond Baratto (23 January 1934 – 16 April 2022) was a French footballer. He was part of France's squad for the 1960 Summer Olympics. Baratto died on 16 April 2022, at the age of 88.

== Football career ==
- Stade de Reims (1955–1961) (28 matches and 2 goals in Division 1)
- Lille OSC (October 1961-Juin 1962)

== Championships ==
- French national champion in 1958 and 1960 (as part of the Stade de Reims team)
