= Amnéville =

Commune in Moselle, Grand Est, France

- Commune
- Town hall of Amnéville

- Coat of arms
- Location of Amnéville
- Location within France Location within Grand Est
- Coordinates: 49°15′41″N 6°08′33″E
- Country: France
- Region: Grand Est
- Department: Moselle
- Arrondissement: Metz
- Canton: Rombas
- Intercommunality: Pays Orne-Moselle

Government
  - Mayor (2020–2026): Éric Munier
- Area^{1}: 10.46 km^{2} (4.04 sq mi)
- Elevation: 130 m (430 ft)
- Highest elevation: 366 m (1,201 ft)
- Lowest elevation: 157 m (515 ft)
- Population (2023): 10,875
  - Density: 1,040/km^{2} (2,693/sq mi)
- Time zone: UTC+01:00 (CET)
  - Summer (DST): UTC+02:00 (CEST)
- INSEE/Postal code: 57019 /57360
- ^{1} French Land Register data, which excludes lakes, ponds, glaciers > 1 km^{2} (0.386 sq mi or 247 acres) and river estuaries.

Amnéville (French pronunciation: [amnevil]; German: Amenweiler, 1940–45: Stahlheim) is a commune in the Moselle department in Grand Est in northeastern France. The town is an important tourist and spa center in France.

== History ==
Amnéville is located in the Moselle valley, between Metz and Thionville. A Celtic presence in the municipal territory of Amnéville has been attested since the 6th century BC. Excavations have demonstrated the existence of a village and a necropolis.

Amnéville was part of the Duchy of Bar until 1480, then of the Duchy of Lorraine.

During the first German annexation, in 1894, the municipality of Amnéville was created by splitting the municipality of Gandrange. The Rombas factory was created at this time. The new municipality was named Stahlheim, literally "City of Steel". Stahlheim-Amnéville, will later be renamed Amnéville-Stahlheim. It became French again in 1919. In 1974, it absorbed the former commune Malancourt-la-Montagne.

== Sights ==
- Traces of Roman road
- Remains of a Roman bridge
- 14th-century castle and church
- Zoo d'Amnéville

Amnéville is known for the SnowWorld Amnéville (formerly Snowhall d'Amnéville), a tourist and sports complex located on a former slag heap that features an indoor ski slope, as well as for its spa and tourist center in the Coulange woods. A casino in the town also notably hosted a stage of the 2010/2011 World Poker Tour season.

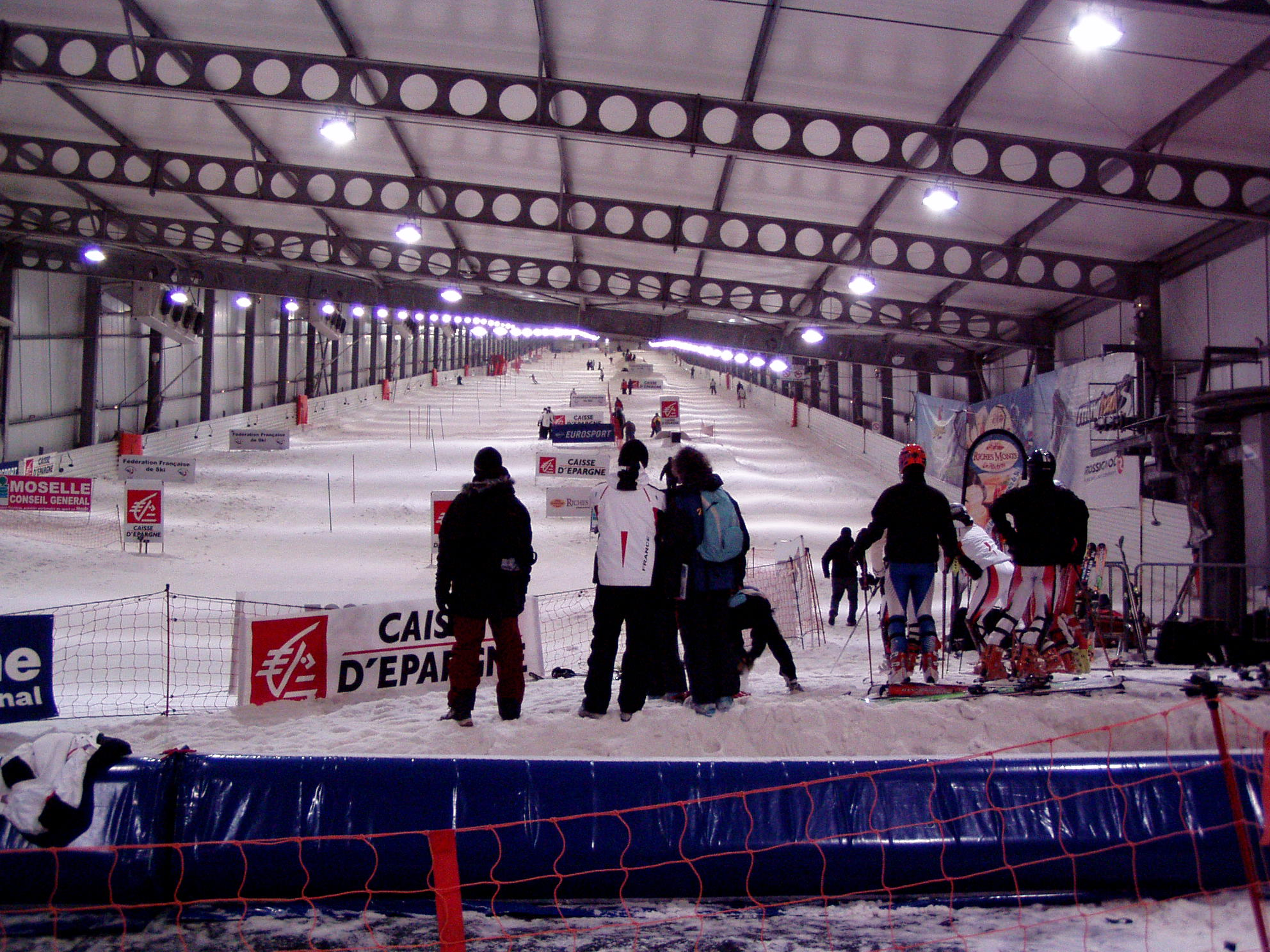
Entrance of the Amnéville zoo (left), indoor ski slope at the Snowhall d'Amnéville during the 2007 French Indoor Alpine Skiing Championships (center), and the Saint-Éloy spa center in Amnéville (right)

== Climate ==
On average, Amnéville experiences 63.2 days per year with a minimum temperature below 0 °C (32.0 °F), 1.8 days per year with a minimum temperature below −10 °C (14.0 °F), 13.9 days per year with a maximum temperature below 0 °C (32.0 °F), and 9.1 days per year with a maximum temperature above 30 °C (86.0 °F). The record high temperature was 39.3 °C (102.7 °F) on July 25, 2019, while the record low temperature was −17.9 °C (−0.2 °F) on January 5, 1985.

Climate data for Malancourt-la-Montagne (1991–2020 normals, extremes 1973–present)
Month	Jan	Feb	Mar	Apr	May	Jun	Jul	Aug	Sep	Oct	Nov	Dec	Year
Record high °C (°F)	15.2 (59.4)	20.9 (69.6)	25.6 (78.1)	27.9 (82.2)	32.4 (90.3)	36.2 (97.2)	39.3 (102.7)	38.2 (100.8)	33.1 (91.6)	26.2 (79.2)	21.1 (70.0)	15.6 (60.1)	39.3 (102.7)
Mean daily maximum °C (°F)	4.1 (39.4)	5.8 (42.4)	10.4 (50.7)	15.0 (59.0)	18.8 (65.8)	22.2 (72.0)	24.3 (75.7)	24.0 (75.2)	19.4 (66.9)	13.8 (56.8)	8.1 (46.6)	4.6 (40.3)	14.2 (57.6)
Daily mean °C (°F)	1.8 (35.2)	2.7 (36.9)	6.3 (43.3)	10.0 (50.0)	13.7 (56.7)	16.9 (62.4)	18.9 (66.0)	18.7 (65.7)	14.8 (58.6)	10.4 (50.7)	5.7 (42.3)	2.6 (36.7)	10.2 (50.4)
Mean daily minimum °C (°F)	−0.4 (31.3)	−0.3 (31.5)	2.2 (36.0)	4.9 (40.8)	8.5 (47.3)	11.5 (52.7)	13.6 (56.5)	13.4 (56.1)	10.2 (50.4)	7.1 (44.8)	3.2 (37.8)	0.6 (33.1)	6.2 (43.2)
Record low °C (°F)	−17.9 (−0.2)	−15.6 (3.9)	−14.6 (5.7)	−6.1 (21.0)	−1.4 (29.5)	−0.1 (31.8)	2.9 (37.2)	2.9 (37.2)	1.3 (34.3)	−3.4 (25.9)	−10.8 (12.6)	−15.5 (4.1)	−17.9 (−0.2)
Average precipitation mm (inches)	85.9 (3.38)	70.2 (2.76)	67.5 (2.66)	52.6 (2.07)	67.9 (2.67)	68.4 (2.69)	70.7 (2.78)	69.5 (2.74)	69.6 (2.74)	79.7 (3.14)	81.7 (3.22)	100.4 (3.95)	884.1 (34.8)
Average precipitation days (≥ 1.0 mm)	13.7	12.0	11.0	9.3	10.6	10.1	10.1	9.7	9.2	11.6	13.6	15.0	135.9
Source: Meteociel

== Population ==
Historical population

Year	Pop.	±% p.a.
1895	93	—
1900	2,066	+85.92%
1905	3,427	+10.65%
1910	4,192	+4.11%
1921	5,006	+1.63%
1926	5,555	+2.10%
1931	6,649	+3.66%
1936	5,642	−3.23%
1946	6,092	+0.77%
1954	7,050	+1.84%

Year	Pop.	±% p.a.
1962	8,149	+1.83%
1968	7,878	−0.56%
1975	8,996	+1.91%
1982	8,951	−0.07%
1990	8,926	−0.03%
1999	9,314	+0.47%
2007	10,150	+1.08%
2012	10,069	−0.16%
2017	10,416	+0.68%
2023	10,875	+0.72%

Source: EHESS and INSEE (1968–2023)

== Sport ==
- The Amnéville Golf Club

== Personalities ==
- Patrick Battiston, footballer
- Raymond Baratto, footballer

== See also ==
- Communes of the Moselle department
