= Carlos Lastarria =

Peruvian sports shooter (1918–1987)

Personal information
- Born: 27 August 1918 Arequipa, Peru
- Died: 19 October 1987 (aged 69)

Sport
- Sport: Sports shooting

Carlos Lastarria (27 August 1918 – 19 October 1987) was a Peruvian sports shooter. He competed at the 1960 Summer Olympics and the 1964 Summer Olympics.
