= Louis Polonia =

French footballer (1935-2005)

Personal information
- Date of birth: 8 January 1935
- Place of birth: Espalion, France
- Date of death: 14 October 2005 (aged 70)

International career
Years	Team	Apps	(Gls)
- France

Louis Polonia (8 January 1935 – 14 October 2005) was a French footballer. He competed in the men's tournament at the 1960 Summer Olympics.
