= Gines Gonzalez =

French footballer (1938–2025)

Personal information
- Date of birth: 11 September 1938
- Place of birth: Saint-Étienne, France
- Date of death: 23 December 2025 (aged 87)
- Place of death: Saint-Priest-en-Jarez, France
- Position: Defender

International career
Years	Team	Apps	(Gls)
- France

Gines Gonzalez (11 September 1938 – 23 December 2025) was a French footballer who played as a defender. He competed in the men's tournament at the 1960 Summer Olympics. Gonzalez died on 23 December 2025, at the age of 87.
