= H. H. Hamid =

Indian footballer (1942–2026)

Personal information
- Full name: Habibul Hasan Hamid
- Date of birth: 11 March 1942
- Date of death: 5 March 2026 (aged 83)
- Place of death: Hyderabad, Telangana, India
- Position: Forward

Senior career*
Years	Team	Apps	(Gls)
- Hyderabad City Police

International career
- India
Medal record
Men's football
Representing India
AFC Asian Cup
Runner-up	1964 Israel	Team
- * Club domestic league appearances and goals

Syed Habibul Hasan Hamid (11 March 1942 – 5 March 2026) was an Indian footballer who played as a forward. He was a player of the Indian team that finished as runners-up in the 1964 AFC Asian Cup. He also represented India at the 1960 Summer Olympics. He also represented the nation in many other International tournaments.

== Biography ==
Hasan was a resident of Vijayanagara Colony, Hyderabad. He was an associate of footballer S. A. Rahim.

He represented India in the 1960 Rome Olympics, and was the youngest player in the team at 19. He was also part of the India team that won silver in the Asia Cup in 1960. In the domestic circuit, he played for Hyderabad Sporting Club, Hyderabad Police, Mohammedan Sporting Club and South Central Railway.

Hasan died after a prolonged illness in Hyderabad, on 5 March 2026, six days before his 84th birthday. He was survived by a son and four daughters.

== Honours ==
India

- AFC Asian Cup runner-up: 1964
