= 1960 Olympics =

The 1960 Olympics may refer to:

- The 1960 Winter Olympics, which were held in Squaw Valley, United States
- The 1960 Summer Olympics, which were held in Rome, Italy
