= Ray Morgan (singer) =

British singer

- Origin: England
- Genres: Pop
- Occupation: Singer
- Instrument: Vocals
- Years active: 1969–1976
- Labels: B & C, Major Minor, Decca

Ray Morgan (born c. 1937 in Chelsea, London) was a British singer who was active from the late 1960s into the 1970s. His version of the Beatles' "The Long and Winding Road", produced by Clive Crawley and arranged and conducted by Johnny Arthey, reached No. 32 on the UK singles chart in July 1970 and remained on the chart for a total of six weeks.

== Discography ==
=== Singles ===
- "The Lord's Prayer" (1969), Major Minor
- "Barefoot Days" (1970), B & C
- "Long and Winding Road" (1970), B & C - UK #32
- "No More Tears" (1970), B & C
- "Friend, Lover, Woman, Wife" (1971), B & C
- "Let's Fall in Love Again" (1971), B & C
- "Let's Go Where the Good Times Go" (1972), B & C
- "Wherever You Are" (1973), Decca
- "My World Gets Smaller Every Day" (1976), Nevis
