= Pierre Bodin =

French footballer (1934-1981)

Personal information
- Date of birth: 23 March 1934
- Place of birth: Saint-Marsault, France
- Date of death: 12 December 1981 (aged 47)
- Position: Defender

International career
Years	Team	Apps	(Gls)
- France

Pierre Bodin (23 March 1934 – 12 December 1981) was a French footballer. He competed in the men's tournament at the 1960 Summer Olympics.
