= Football at the 1980 Summer Olympics – Men's European Qualifiers =

Men's European Qualifier
Tournament details
- Teams: 22 (from 1 confederation)

The European Qualifiers for men's football competitions at the 1980 Summer Olympics to be held in Moscow.

Beside the already qualified Soviet Union as the hosts and East Germany as the holders, the European countries obtained 4 additional spots in the Olympic football tournament. These four spots were contested by 20 countries.

This qualification competition was split in two parts. Four countries were selected to bypass the first round among which were 2 "capitalist" and 2 "socialist" camp countries: France, West Germany and Poland, Yugoslavia. The 16 other countries were placed in 4 groups of 4, while only one group played in the full double round robin format with other 3 used simple the home-away play-off with 2 from each group advancing to the second round.

In the second round the eight teams were joined with the four teams that received bye in the first round and placed in 4 groups of 3. All groups used the double round-robin format to determine a group winner which would qualify for each of the European 4 spots.

== First round ==
=== Group 1 ===
Team 1	Agg.	Team 2	1st leg	2nd leg
Bulgaria	1–4	Czechoslovakia	1–0	0–4
Romania	2–3	Hungary	2–0	0–3

=== Group 2 ===
Team 1	Agg.	Team 2	1st leg	2nd leg
Greece	1–4	Italy	1–0	0–4
Austria	2–2 (3–4 p)	Turkey	1–0	1–2

=== Group 3 ===
Pos	Team	Pld	W	D	L	GF	GA	GD	Pts	Qualification
1	Belgium	6	4	2	0	9	3	+6	10	advanced to the second round
2	Spain	6	2	3	1	10	6	+4	7	advanced to the second round
3	Israel	6	1	3	2	6	10	−4	5	
4	Netherlands	6	0	2	4	6	12	−6	2	

=== Group 4 ===
Team 1	Agg.	Team 2	1st leg	2nd leg
Republic of Ireland	1–2	Norway	0–0	1–2
Denmark	2–5	Finland	1–1	1–4

== Second round ==
=== Group A ===
Pos	Team	Pld	W	D	L	GF	GA	GD	Pts	Qualification
1	Czechoslovakia	4	3	0	1	5	5	0	6	qualified to the 1980 Summer Olympics
2	Hungary	4	2	0	2	7	4	+3	4	
3	Poland	4	1	0	3	1	4	−3	2	

=== Group B ===
Pos	Team	Pld	W	D	L	GF	GA	GD	Pts	Qualification
1	Yugoslavia	4	3	0	1	9	3	+6	6	qualified to the 1980 Summer Olympics
2	Italy	4	3	0	1	10	5	+5	6	
3	Turkey	4	0	0	4	0	11	−11	0	

=== Group C ===
Pos	Team	Pld	W	D	L	GF	GA	GD	Pts	Qualification
1	Spain	4	2	1	1	7	4	+3	5	qualified to the 1980 Summer Olympics
2	Belgium	4	2	0	2	7	8	−1	4	
3	France	4	1	1	2	7	9	−2	3	

=== Group D ===
Pos	Team	Pld	W	D	L	GF	GA	GD	Pts	Qualification
1	Norway	4	3	1	0	5	1	+4	7	withdrew from final tournament
2	West Germany	4	1	1	2	2	3	−1	3	withdrew from final tournament
3	Finland	4	0	2	2	1	4	−3	2	qualified to the 1980 Summer Olympics
