= Football at the 1984 Summer Olympics – Men's European Qualifiers =

Men's European Qualifier
Tournament details
- Teams: 21 (from 1 confederation)

The European Qualifiers for men's football competitions at the 1984 Summer Olympics to be held in Los Angeles. The tournament took place from 2 March 1983 to 25 April 1984 including a preliminary round.

The Soviet Union, East Germany and Poland qualified, but then withdrew. West Germany, Norway and Yugoslavia entered in their place.

== Group 1 ==
Pos	Team	Pld	W	D	L	GF	GA	GD	Pts	Qualification
1	Soviet Union	6	3	2	1	9	4	+5	8	withdrew from final tournament
2	Hungary	6	3	2	1	8	5	+3	8	
3	Bulgaria	6	1	5	0	7	5	+2	7	
4	Greece	6	0	1	5	4	14	−10	1	
5	Turkey	0	-	-	-	-	-	—	0	withdrew

== Group 2 ==
Pos	Team	Pld	W	D	L	GF	GA	GD	Pts	Qualification
1	East Germany	8	5	3	0	11	1	+10	13	withdrew from final tournament
2	Poland	8	4	3	1	12	5	+7	11	withdrew from final tournament
3	Norway	8	2	4	2	4	6	−2	8	1984 Summer Olympics
4	Denmark	8	1	3	4	6	12	−6	5	
5	Finland	8	1	1	6	5	14	−9	3	

== Group 3 ==
=== Preliminary play-off ===
Team 1	Agg.	Team 2	1st leg	2nd leg
Liechtenstein	1–6	Netherlands	0–3	1–3

=== Group stage ===
Pos	Team	Pld	W	D	L	GF	GA	GD	Pts	Qualification
1	Yugoslavia	6	4	1	1	14	6	+8	9	1984 Summer Olympics
2	Romania	6	3	2	1	7	5	+2	8	
3	Italy	6	0	4	2	7	12	−5	4	
4	Netherlands	6	0	3	3	4	9	−5	3	

== Group 4 ==
=== Subgroup 1 ===
Pos	Team	Pld	W	D	L	GF	GA	GD	Pts	Qualification
1	West Germany	4	3	0	1	7	3	+4	6	Advanced to the Group final
2	Portugal	4	2	0	2	5	6	−1	4	
3	Israel	4	1	0	3	2	5	−3	2	

=== Subgroup 2 ===
Pos	Team	Pld	W	D	L	GF	GA	GD	Pts	Qualification
1	France	4	3	1	0	7	2	+5	7	Advanced to the Group final
2	Belgium	4	0	3	1	1	3	−2	3	
3	Spain	4	0	2	2	1	4	−3	2	

=== Group final ===
Team 1	Agg.	Team 2	1st leg	2nd leg
France	2–1	West Germany	1–1	1–0
