= O. Chandrasekhar =

Indian footballer (1935–2021)

O. Chandrasekhar Menon
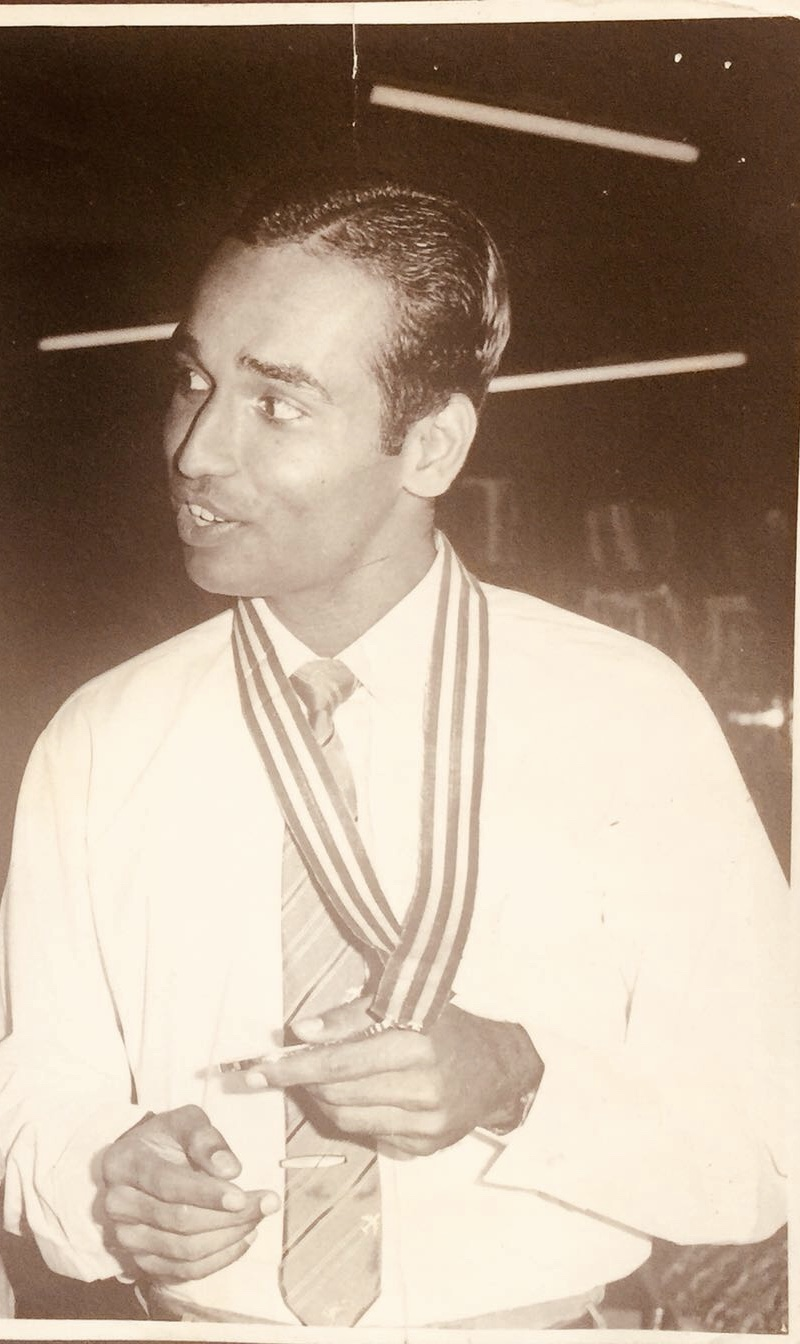

Personal information
- Date of birth: 10 July 1935
- Place of birth: Irinjalakuda, Kingdom of Cochin, British India (present-day Kerala, India)
- Date of death: 24 August 2021 (aged 86)
- Place of death: Kochi, India
- Position: Defender

Senior career*
Years	Team	Apps	(Gls)
1956–1966	Caltex SC		
1966–1973	State Bank of India		

International career
1958–1966	India		
Medal record
Men's football
Representing India
Asian Games
Gold medal – first place	1962 Jakarta	Team
AFC Asian Cup
Runner-up	1964 Israel	Team
- * Club domestic league appearances and goals

O. Chandrasekhar Menon (10 July 1935 – 24 August 2021) was an Indian professional footballer who played as a defender. He represented India at the 1960 Summer Olympics (Rome), the 1962 Asian Games (Gold medal), 1964 AFC Asian Cup (Silver medal), Merdeka Tournament (Silver Medal - 1959 & 1964) and 1964 Summer Olympics (Tokyo Qualifiers).

== Early life and club career ==
=== Early life ===
Born in Irinjalakuda (India), Chandrasekhar honed his football skills at Maharaja's College in Ernakulam (India).

=== Club career ===
- Caltex, Bombay: 1956–1966
- State Bank of India: 1966–1973

=== National championship (Santosh trophy) ===
- Maharashtra: 1956–1966

== International career ==
He was a member of the Indian team in the 1960 Rome Olympics, where India famously held France 1–1 in a game, courtesy of Chandrasekhar and his defensive partners. He was also part of Indian teams that won gold in the 1962 Asian Games, silver in the 1964 AFC Asian Cup, silver in the Merdeka Tournament (1959 and 1964). He played alongside some of the greatest names in Indian football like Pradip Kumar Banerjee, Chuni Goswami, Tulsidas Balaram, Peter Thangaraj, Jarnail Singh, and Mariappa Kempaiah, under coaching of Syed Abdul Rahim. He also captained India in few tournaments.

== Manager career ==
- Chandrashekar became general manager of FC Kochin in 1994–95.

== Death ==
After suffering from age related illness since 2015, O. Chandrasekhar died in Kochi on 24 August 2021. He was 86 years old.

== Honours ==
=== International ===
- 1962 Asian Games
  - (gold) Gold Medal
- 1964 AFC Asian Cup
  - (silver) Silver Medal
- Merdeka cup (Malaysia)
  - (silver) Silver Medal (1959, 1964)

=== Domestic ===
- 1963 Santosh Trophy
  - (gold) Champion

=== Personal ===
- Selected in Kerala's all time dream team (football)
- Selected as Kerala's top 10 Sports Person of the Century

== Bibliography ==
- Kapadia, Novy (2017). Barefoot to Boots: The Many Lives of Indian Football. Penguin Random House. ISBN 978-0-143-42641-7.
- Martinez, Dolores; Mukharjiim, Projit B (2009). Football: From England to the World: The Many Lives of Indian Football. Routledge. ISBN 978-1-138-88353-6. Archived from the original on 2 July 2022.
- Nath, Nirmal (2011). History of Indian Football: Upto 2009–10. Readers Service. ISBN 9788187891963. Archived from the original on 22 July 2022.
- Dineo, Paul; Mills, James (2001). Soccer in South Asia: Empire, Nation, Diaspora. London, United Kingdom: Frank Cass Publishers. ISBN 978-0-7146-8170-2. Archived from the original on 25 July 2022.
- "Triumphs and Disasters: The Story of Indian Football, 1889—2000" (PDF). Archived from the original (PDF) on 13 August 2012.
- Majumdar, Boria, Bandyopadhyay, Kausik (2006). Goalless: The Story of a Unique Footballing Nation. Penguin India. ISBN 9780670058747.
- Majumdar, Boria; Bandyopadhyay, Kausik (2006). A Social History Of Indian Football: Striving To Score. Routledge. ISBN 9780415348355. Archived from the original on 29 June 2021.
- Basu, Jaydeep (2003). Stories from Indian Football. UBS Publishers' Distributors. ISBN 9788174764546. Archived from the original on 11 October 2022.
