= Jean Wettstein =

French footballer (born 1933)

Personal information
- Date of birth: 13 March 1933 (age 93)
- Place of birth: Mulhouse, France
- Height: 1.86 m (6 ft 1 in)
- Position: Goalkeeper

Senior career*
| Years | Team | Apps | (Gls) |
- Mulhouse

International career
- France
- * Club domestic league appearances and goals

Jean Wettstein (born 13 March 1933) is a French former footballer who played as a goalkeeper. He competed in the men's tournament at the 1960 Summer Olympics.
