= Jean-Baptiste Bordas =

French footballer (1938–2024)

Personal information
- Date of birth: 8 January 1938
- Place of birth: Orléans, France
- Date of death: 7 March 2024 (aged 86)
- Position: Midfielder

International career
Years	Team	Apps	(Gls)
- France

Jean-Baptiste Bordas (8 January 1938 – 7 March 2024) was a French footballer. He competed in the men's tournament at the 1960 Summer Olympics. Bordas died on 7 March 2024, at the age of 86.
