= Fortunato Franco =

Indian footballer (1937–2021)

Personal information
- Date of birth: 1937
- Place of birth: Colvale, Portuguese India
- Date of death: 10 May 2021 (aged 84)
- Place of death: Goa, India
- Position: Half back

Senior career*
Years	Team	Apps	(Gls)
- Western Railways
- Tata
1959–1966	Maharashtra		
- Salgaocar

International career
1960–1965	India	26	
Medal record
Men's football
Representing India
Asian Games
Gold medal – first place	1962 Jakarta	Team
AFC Asian Cup
Runner-up	1964 Israel	Team
- * Club domestic league appearances and goals

Fortunato Franco (1937 – 10 May 2021) was an Indian international footballer who played as a half back.

== Early and personal life ==
Franco was born in 1937 in Colvale in Goa, Portuguese India, moving to Mumbai at the age of six.

== Club career ==
Franco played club football with Western Railways, Tata, Maharashtra and Salgaocar. He captained Maharashtra for eight seasons and won the 1964 Santosh Trophy with them. He retired before the age of 30 due to a knee injury.

== International career ==
Franco was part of the India national team which appeared at the 1960 Olympics, although he did not appear at the tournament, and he won gold with India at the 1962 Asian Games. He also played at the Merdeka Cup in 1964 (winning silver) and 1965 (winning bronze). In total he earned 26 caps with the national team before retiring in 1965, following his debut in 1960.

== Later life and death ==
After retiring from football in 1966, he worked for Tata Group as a senior manager in public relations, before retiring in 1999 and moving back to Goa. He died on 10 May 2021, aged 84, leaving behind a wife and two children.

== Honours ==
India

- Asian Games Gold medal: 1962
- AFC Asian Cup runners-up: 1964
- Merdeka Tournament runner-up: 1964; third-place: 1965
