= Carlos Cedron =

Peruvian sports shooter

Personal information
- Born: 1 March 1933 Trujillo, Peru
- Died: 1999 (aged 65–66)

Sport
- Sport: Sports shooting

Carlos Cedron (1 March 1933 – 1999) was a Peruvian sports shooter. He competed in the 50 metre rifle, three positions event at the 1960 Summer Olympics in Rome, Italy.
