= Mundiyath Devdas =

Indian footballer

Personal information
- Date of birth: 12 March 1935
- Position: Forward

Senior career*
Years	Team	Apps	(Gls)
- Tata SC

International career
- India
- * Club domestic league appearances and goals

Mundiyath Devdas (born 12 March 1935) is an Indian former footballer who played as a forward. He was part of the team that played in the 1960 Summer Olympics.
