= Gérard Aygoui =

French footballer (1936–2021)

Personal information
- Date of birth: 5 October 1936
- Place of birth: Montpellier, France
- Date of death: 12 March 2021 (aged 84)
- Place of death: Montpellier, France
- Height: 1.68 m (5 ft 6 in)
- Position: Forward

Senior career*
Years	Team	Apps	(Gls)
1953–1955	Montpellier	9	(0)
1957–1964	Marseille	73	(27)
1963–1964	→ Nîmes	6	(2)
Total		88	(29)

International career
1960	France	0	(0)
- * Club domestic league appearances and goals

Gérard Aygoui (5 October 1936 – 12 March 2021) was a French footballer who played as a forward.

== Biography ==
Aygoui began his career with Montpellier HSC before joining Olympique de Marseille in 1957. He played 21 games in Division 1 for the team, scoring 2 goals, as well as 52 games in Division 2 with 21 goals. He scored 13 goals in the 1960–61 season, including a hat trick against US Boulogne. In 1962, he played a Europa League match for Marseille against the Belgian club Royale Union Saint-Gilloise in which he scored one goal in a loss. He was selected to play for France in the 1960 Summer Olympics, but did not appear in a match.

Gérard Aygoui died in Montpellier on 12 March 2021 at the age of 84.
