= Charles Géronimi =

French footballer and soldier

Personal information
- Full name: Charles Jean Louis Géronimi
- Date of birth: 8 February 1895
- Place of birth: Villepreux, Seine-et-Oise, France
- Date of death: 9 November 1918 (aged 23)
- Place of death: Souilly, Meuse, France
- Position: Midfielder

Senior career*
Years	Team	Apps	(Gls)
1910–1914	AF Garenne-Colombes		

International career
1914	France	1	(1)
- * Club domestic league appearances and goals

Charles Jean Louis Géronimi (8 February 1895 – 9 November 1918) was a French footballer who played as a midfielder for AF Garenne-Colombes and the French national team in the early 1910s.

== Early life ==
Charles Géronimi was born in Villepreux in the former Seine-et-Oise department (currently Yvelines) on 8 February 1895, to a father of Corsican origin, a soldier who became director of an orphanage.

== Playing career ==
Together with his older brother Georges and Jean Rigal, Géronimi practiced so-called outdoor sports in the modest patronage of Abbé Marchand, the Association Fraternelle de la Garenne-Colombes (AFGC), doing so purely for the pleasure of it, unrelated to official status, since the AFGC could not claim to win any championship.In keeping to the amateur spirit of the "patros", he only knew this one club. His brother was even the club's treasurer for a long time, until 1939, while Charles was an accountant in a company selling textiles.

Throughout the early 1910s, players from the patronages began to be driven out from the French national team to the point that not a single one remained for the friendly match against Belgium in January 1914, but for the friendly against Luxembourg on 8 February 1914, two players from the patronages were urgently recalled, Géronimi, who was celebrating his 19th birthday, and Maurice Olivier from Étoile des deux lacs, and they were the last two because the humiliating 5–4 defeat was unfairly blamed on them, even though Géronimi scored his side's third goal, which gave the French the lead just before the break. His brother Georges also had one cap for the France national team in 1911, and it also ended in a loss, 2–5 to Switzerland. Similarly, the Renaux brothers (André and Charles also had only one cap each.

== Later life and death ==
Géronimi fought in the First World War; his military record states that he belonged to the 501st tank division, while the French newspaper Sporting reports that he became a combat pilot and was shot down during an aerial duel on the Western Front and died in early 1915. He died from his injuries in a hospital in Souilly on 9 November 1918, just two days before the Armistice of 11 November 1918. Charles died aged only 23, while his brother Georges lived to be a hundred, thus becoming the first centenarian of the French national team.

== Career statistics ==
France score listed first, score column indicates score after each Géronimi goal.

List of international goals scored by Charles Géronimi
No.	Date	Venue	Opponent	Score	Result	Competition
1	8 February 1914	Stade Achille Hammerel, Luxembourg City, Luxembourg	Luxembourg	3–2	4–5	Friendly match
