= Mario Desiderio =

Argentinian footballer

Personal information
- Full name: Mario Oscar Desiderio
- Date of birth: 1 February 1938 (age 88)
- Place of birth: Buenos Aires, Argentina
- Height: 1.69 m (5 ft 7 in)
- Position: Striker

Youth career
- Estudiantes

Senior career*
| Years | Team | Apps | (Gls) |
| 1959–1963 | Estudiantes | 24 | (3) |
| 1960–1962 | → Catania (loan) | 11 | (1) |
| 1962–1963 | → Roma (loan) | | |
| 1964–1966 | O'Higgins | 102 | (45) |
| 1967–1970 | Deportivo Cali | 166 | (30) |
| 1971 | Oro Negro | | |
| 1973 | Unión Magdalena | | |

International career
| 1963 | Argentina Olympic | 6 | (6) |
- * Club domestic league appearances and goals

Mario Oscar Desiderio (born 1 February 1938) is a former Argentine footballer who played in Argentina, Chile, Colombia and Italy as a striker. He was part of Argentina's squad at the 1960 Summer Olympics.

== Teams ==
- (Argentina) Estudiantes de La Plata 1954–1959
- (Italy) Catania 1960–1962
- (Italy) Roma 1962–1963
- (Chile) O'Higgins 1964–1966
- (Colombia) Deportivo Cali 1967–1970
- (Colombia) Oro Negro 1971
- (Colombia) Unión Magdalena 1973

== Honours ==
O'Higgins

- Primera B de Chile: 1964
