= François Philippe =

French footballer (1930-2001)

Personal information
- Date of birth: 4 November 1930
- Place of birth: Finistère, France
- Date of death: 7 November 2001 (aged 71)

International career
Years	Team	Apps	(Gls)
- France

François Philippe (4 November 1930 – 7 November 2001) was a French footballer. He competed in the men's tournament at the 1960 Summer Olympics.
