= Charles Samoy =

French footballer and manager (born 1939)

Personal information
- Date of birth: 30 April 1939 (age 87)
- Place of birth: Escaudain, France
- Height: 1.80 m (5 ft 11 in)
- Position: Goalkeeper

Youth career
- AC Denain

Senior career*
Years	Team	Apps	(Gls)
1958–1961	CO Roubaix-Tourcoing		
1961–1963	Le Havre		
1963–1974	Lille		

Managerial career
- 1976–1977: Lille
- 1997: Lille
- * Club domestic league appearances and goals

Charles Samoy (born 30 April 1939) is a former French football player and manager. As a player, Samoy played for AC Denain, CO Roubaix-Tourcoing, Le Havre and Lille, and participated in the 1960 Summer Olympics. As a manager, he enjoyed two spells in charge of Lille, from 1976 to 1977 and in 1997.
