= Jacques Stamm =

French footballer (born 1939)

Personal information
- Date of birth: 4 April 1939 (age 87)
- Place of birth: Fumay, France
- Position: Forward

International career
| Years | Team | Apps | (Gls) |
- France

Jacques Stamm (born 4 April 1939) is a French former footballer. He competed in the men's tournament at the 1960 Summer Olympics.
