= Jaime Ruiz (Peruvian footballer) =

Peruvian footballer (born 1935)

Personal information
- Full name: Jaime Ruíz La Rosa
- Date of birth: 23 May 1935 (age 91)
- Place of birth: Ica, Peru
- Height: 1.70 m (5 ft 7 in)
- Position: Forward

International career
Years	Team	Apps	(Gls)
- Peru

Jaime Ruiz (born 23 May 1935) is a Peruvian footballer. He competed in the men's tournament at the 1960 Summer Olympics.
