= Humberto Arguedas =

Peruvian footballer (born 1937)

Personal information
- Date of birth: 31 October 1937 (age 88)
- Place of birth: Lima, Peru

International career
Years	Team	Apps	(Gls)
- Peru

Humberto Arguedas (born 31 October 1937) is a Peruvian former footballer. He competed in the men's tournament at the 1960 Summer Olympics.
