= Víctor Boulanger =

Peruvian footballer (born 1940)

Personal information
- Date of birth: 15 July 1940 (age 86)
- Place of birth: Talara, Peru
- Height: 1.70 m (5 ft 7 in)
- Position: Defender

International career
Years	Team	Apps	(Gls)
- Peru

Víctor Boulanger (born 15 July 1940) is a Peruvian footballer. He competed in the men's tournament at the 1960 Summer Olympics.
