= Alejandro Guzmán (footballer) =

Peruvian footballer (born 1941)

Personal information
- Date of birth: 11 January 1941
- Place of birth: Chorrillos, Lima, Peru
- Date of death: unknown
- Height: 1.72 m (5 ft 8 in)
- Position: Forward

International career
Years	Team	Apps	(Gls)
- Peru

Alejandro Guzmán (11 January 1941 – date of death unknown) was a Peruvian footballer. He competed in the men's tournament at the 1960 Summer Olympics. Guzmán is deceased.
