= Juan Biselach =

Peruvian footballer (born 1940)

Personal information
- Date of birth: 7 August 1940 (age 86)
- Place of birth: San Vicente, Peru
- Height: 1.69 m (5 ft 7 in)
- Position: Midfielder

International career
Years	Team	Apps	(Gls)
- Peru

Juan Biselach (born 7 August 1940) is a Peruvian footballer. He competed in the men's tournament at the 1960 Summer Olympics.
