= Ahmed Arab =

French footballer (1933–2023)

Personal information
- Date of birth: 19 March 1933
- Place of birth: Chlef, French Algeria
- Date of death: 1 March 2023 (aged 89)
- Position: Defender

Senior career*
| Years | Team | Apps | (Gls) |
- WR Belcourt
- ESA Brive
- Limoges FC
- CR Belcourt

International career
| 1960 | France Olympics | | |
| 1963–1964 | Algeria | 5 | (0) |
- * Club domestic league appearances and goals

Ahmed Arab (Arabic: أحمد عرب; 19 March 1933 – 1 March 2023) was an Algerian footballer who played as a defender. He competed in the men's tournament at the 1960 Summer Olympics representing France. He later represented Algeria between 1963 and 1964.
