= Daniel Eral =

Peruvian footballer (born 1940)

Personal information
- Date of birth: 17 October 1940 (age 86)
- Place of birth: Lima, Peru
- Position: Midfielder

International career
Years	Team	Apps	(Gls)
- Peru

Daniel Eral (born 17 October 1940) is a Peruvian footballer. He competed in the men's tournament at the 1960 Summer Olympics.
