= Héctor de Guevara =

Peruvian footballer (born 1940)

Personal information
- Full name: Héctor Ladrón de Guevara Salas
- Date of birth: 20 March 1940
- Place of birth: Arequipa, Peru
- Date of death: 15 September 2024 (aged 84)
- Position: Defender

International career
Years	Team	Apps	(Gls)
- Peru

Héctor Ladrón de Guevara Salas (20 March 1940 – 15 September 2024) was a Peruvian footballer. He competed in the men's tournament at the 1960 Summer Olympics. He was also part of Peru's squad for the 1963 South American Championship.
