= Georges Géronimi =

French footballer (1892-1994)

Personal information
- Date of birth: 16 June 1892
- Date of death: 6 March 1994 (aged 101)
- Position: Forward

Senior career*
Years	Team	Apps	(Gls)
1911	AF Garenne-Colombes		

International career
1911	France	1	(0)
- * Club domestic league appearances and goals

Georges Géronimi (16 June 1892 – 6 March 1994) was a French football forward. He played with AF Garenne-Colombes and represented France in one 5-2 loss in a friendly against Switzerland. His brother Charles also had one cap for the France national team in 1914 and was killed the following year during World War I.
