= Erny Brenner =

Luxembourgish footballer (1931–2016)

- Brenner playing for Luxembourg in 1962

Personal information
- Date of birth: 13 September 1931
- Place of birth: Dudelange, Luxembourg
- Date of death: 9 July 2016 (aged 84)
- Position: Defender

Senior career*
Years	Team	Apps	(Gls)
1950–1952	Aris Bonnevoie		
1952–1971	Stade Dudelange		

International career
1955–1965	Luxembourg	14	(0)
- * Club domestic league appearances and goals

Erny Brenner (13 September 1931 – 9 July 2016) was a Luxembourgish professional footballer. He represented the Luxembourg national team from 1955 to 1965.
