= François Konter =

Luxembourgish footballer (1934–2018)

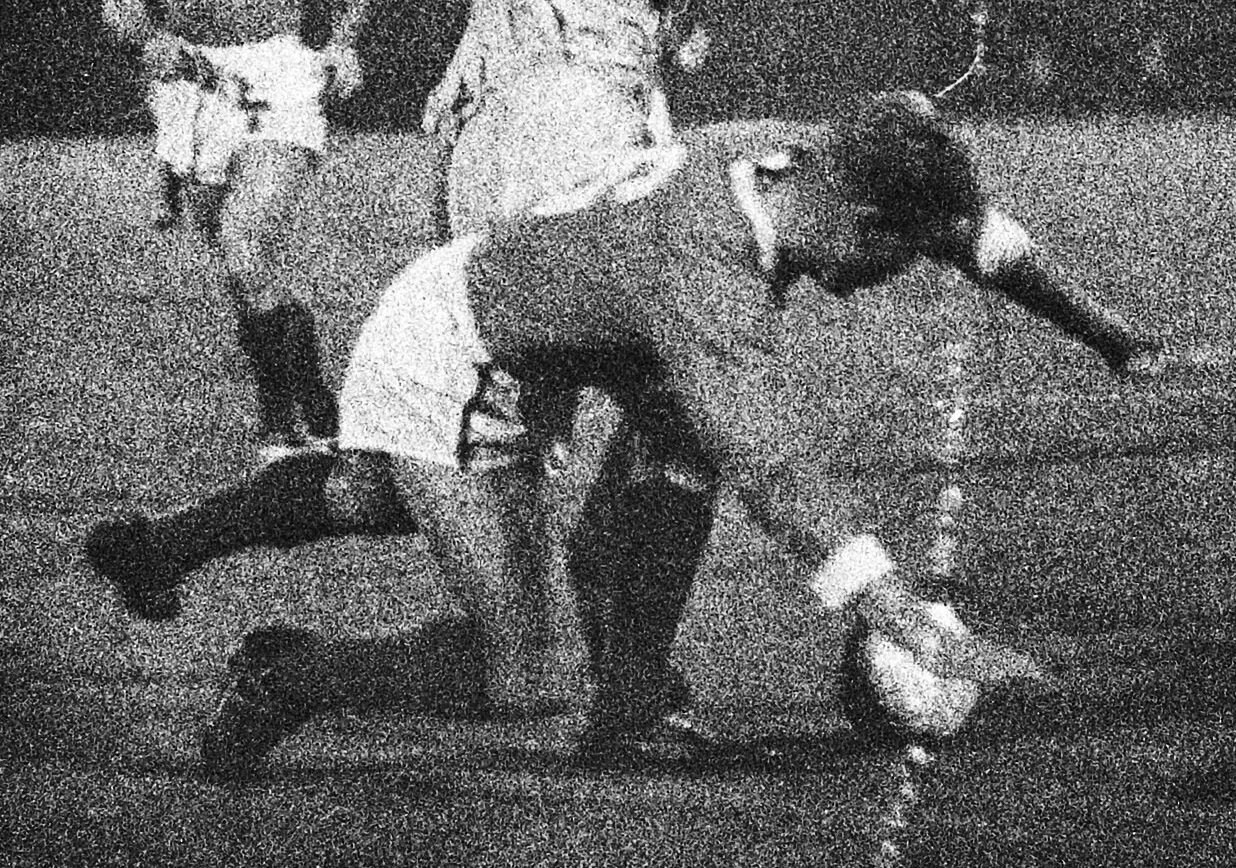
- François Konter with Luxembourg against the Netherlands on 11 September 1963

Personal information
- Full name: François Konter
- Date of birth: 20 February 1935
- Place of birth: Lasauvage, Luxembourg
- Date of death: 29 August 2018 (aged 83)
- Position: Centre-back

Senior career*
| Years | Team | Apps | (Gls) |
| 1950–1961 | Chiers Rodange | | |
| 1961–1966 | Anderlecht | 20 | (0) |
| 1966–1967 | Crossing Molenbeek | | |
| 1967–1971 | AA Gent | | |

International career^{‡}
| 1955–1969 | Luxembourg | 77 | (4) |
- * Club domestic league appearances and goals as of 3 March 2009 ‡ National team caps and goals as of 3 March 2009

François "Bitzi" Konter (20 February 1934 – 29 August 2018) was a Luxembourgish professional footballer.

== Club career ==
Konter started his career at local team Chiers Rodange but played much of his club football in Belgium, for RSC Anderlecht and AA Gent.

== International career ==
He played for Luxembourg's national team at the height of the country's footballing strength, making his debut in October 1955 against Switzerland, and was an integral part of the team that almost reached the semi-finals of the 1964 European Championship.

During his international career, Konter played 77 games and scored four goals. He played in 16 FIFA World Cup qualification matches.

He was the country's all-time record cap holder from November 1966 until November 1995 when Carlo Weis overtook his tally. He played his final international game in April 1969, in a World Cup qualifier against Bulgaria.

=== International goals ===
Scores and results list Luxembourg's goal tally first.

| # | Date | Venue | Opponent | Score | Result | Competition |
|---|---|---|---|---|---|---|
| 1 | 11 November 1956 | Esch-sur-Alzette, Luxembourg | Switzerland | | 4–1 | Exhibition game |
| 2 | 26 April 1959 | Luxembourg City, Luxembourg | Switzerland | | 2–0 | Exhibition game |
| 3 | 28 February 1960 | Luxembourg City, Luxembourg | Belgium | | 2–5 | Exhibition game |
| 4 | 10 April 1960 | Luxembourg City, Luxembourg | France | | 5–3 | Olympic qualification |

== Honours ==
- Belgian First Division: 1962, 1964, 1965, 1966
- Belgian Cup: 1965

== Personal life ==
Konter married Ginette Faber in 1981. They have one daughter, Nadine. His grandson Yannick Bianchini played for Jeunesse Esch and UN Käerjeng 97.
