= Hugo Carmona =

Peruvian footballer (1939–2011)

Personal information
- Date of birth: 1 April 1939
- Place of birth: Lima, Peru
- Date of death: 30 May 2011 (aged 72)
- Height: 1.69 m (5 ft 7 in)
- Position: Defender

International career
Years	Team	Apps	(Gls)
- Peru

Hugo Carmona (1 April 1939 – 30 May 2011) was a Peruvian footballer. He competed in the men's tournament at the 1960 Summer Olympics.
