= Gérard Coinçon =

French footballer (born 1939)

Personal information
- Date of birth: 18 March 1939 (age 87)
- Place of birth: Belfort, France
- Position: Forward

International career
Years	Team	Apps	(Gls)
- France

Gérard Coinçon (born 18 March 1939) is a French footballer. He competed in the men's tournament at the 1960 Summer Olympics.
