= János Göröcs =

Hungarian footballer (1939–2020)

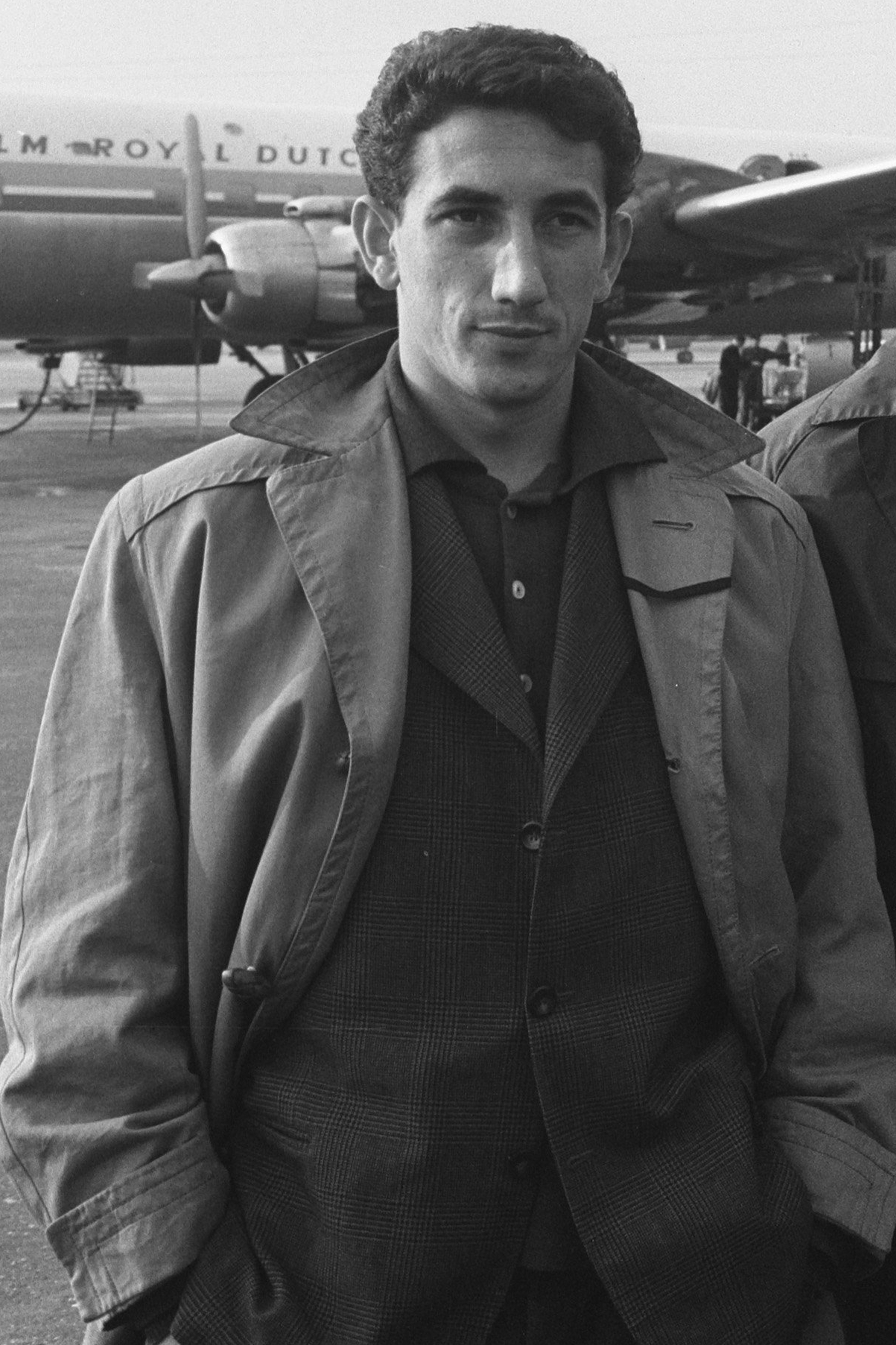

Personal information
- Date of birth: 8 May 1939
- Place of birth: Gánt, Hungary
- Date of death: 23 February 2020 (aged 80)
- Place of death: Budapest, Hungary
- Position: Midfielder

Senior career*
Years	Team	Apps	(Gls)
1957–1972	Újpest FC		
1972–1974	Tatabányai Bányász		

International career
1958–1970	Hungary	62	(19)

Managerial career
- 1985–1988: Újpest FC
Medal record
Men's association football
Representing Hungary
Olympic Games
Bronze medal – third place	1960 Rome	Team competition
- * Club domestic league appearances and goals

János Göröcs (8 May 1939 – 23 February 2020) was a Hungarian footballer. He played for the club Újpesti Dózsa as a striker and a midfielder, and later for Tatabányai Bányász. He played 62 games and scored 19 goals for the Hungary national football team.

Göröcs was born in Gánt. He was best-known for his participation in the bronze medal winning Hungarian team on the 1960 Summer Olympic Games and for playing on the 1962 FIFA World Cup. He later became trainer of Újpest.
