= Tomás Iwasaki =

Peruvian footballer (1937–2020)

Personal information
- Full name: Tomás Iwasaki Espinoza
- Date of birth: 13 November 1937
- Place of birth: Lima, Peru
- Date of death: 23 April 2020 (aged 82)
- Height: 1.73 m (5 ft 8 in)
- Position: Forward

International career
Years	Team	Apps	(Gls)
- Peru

Tomás Iwasaki Espinoza (13 November 1937 – 23 April 2020) was a Peruvian footballer. He competed in the men's tournament at the 1960 Summer Olympics. He won the Peruvian league title four times with Universitario.
