= Teodoro Luña =

Peruvian footballer (1938–2014)

Teodoro Luna
Personal information
- Date of birth: 29 October 1938
- Place of birth: Lima, Peru
- Date of death: 30 August 2014 (aged 75)
- Position: Defender

International career
Years	Team	Apps	(Gls)
- Peru

Teodoro Luna (29 October 1938 – 30 August 2014) was a Peruvian footballer. He competed in the men's tournament at the 1960 Summer Olympics. He died on 30 August 2014, at the age of 75.
