= André Giamarchi =

French footballer (1931-2012)

Personal information
- Date of birth: 24 July 1931
- Place of birth: Skikda, Algeria
- Date of death: 25 September 2012 (aged 81)
- Position: Forward

International career
Years	Team	Apps	(Gls)
- France

André Giamarchi (24 July 1931 – 25 September 2012) was a French footballer. He competed in the men's tournament at the 1960 Summer Olympics.
