= Carlos Salinas (footballer) =

Peruvian footballer (1938–2022)

Personal information
- Date of birth: 12 October 1938
- Place of birth: Ica, Peru
- Date of death: 21 March 2022 (aged 83)
- Position: Goalkeeper

International career
Years	Team	Apps	(Gls)
- Peru

Carlos Salinas (12 October 1938 – 21 Mars 2022) was a Peruvian footballer. He competed in the men's tournament at the 1960 Summer Olympics. He died on 21 March 2022, at the age of 83.
