= Gerardo Altuna =

Peruvian footballer (born 1939)

Personal information
- Date of birth: 7 April 1939 (age 87)
- Place of birth: San Vicente, Peru
- Height: 1.72 m (5 ft 8 in)
- Position: Forward

International career
Years	Team	Apps	(Gls)
- Peru

Gerardo Altuna Delgado (born 7 April 1939) is a Peruvian footballer. He competed in the men's tournament at the 1960 Summer Olympics.
