= Herminio Campos =

Peruvian footballer (born 1937)

Personal information
- Full name: Herminio Campos Ayllón
- Date of birth: 25 April 1937 (age 89)
- Place of birth: Lima, Peru
- Height: 1.70 m (5 ft 7 in)
- Position: Goalkeeper

International career
Years	Team	Apps	(Gls)
- Peru

Herminio Campos (born 25 April 1937) is a Peruvian former footballer. He competed in the men's tournament at the 1960 Summer Olympics.
