= Raymond C. Morgan =

American football and basketball coach (1897–1953)

Biographical details
- Born: February 12, 1897; Dayton, Ohio, U.S.
- Died: February 5, 1953 (aged 55); San Diego, California, U.S.

Playing career

Football
- 1921–1923: Purdue

Coaching career (HC unless noted)

Football
- 1926–1927: Susquehanna
- 1929–1930: Lock Haven
- 1931: Murray State

Basketball
- 1927–1929: Susquehanna
- 1929–1931: Lock Haven

Head coaching record
- Overall: 20–21–1 (football); 9–29 (basketball)

Raymond Clyde Morgan (February 12, 1897 – February 5, 1953) was an American football and basketball coach. He served as the head football coach of three different schools: Susquehanna University from 1926 to 1927, Lock Haven University from 1929 to 1930, and Murray State University in 1931, compiling a career college football coaching record of 20–21–1.

== Head coaching record ==
=== Football ===
| Year | Team | Overall | Conference | Standing | Bowl/playoffs |
|---|---|---|---|---|---|
Susquehanna Crusaders (Independent) (1926–1928)
| 1926 | Susquehanna | 4–6 | | | |
| 1927 | Susquehanna | 3–6 | | | |
| Susquehanna: | | 7–12 | | | |
Lock Haven Bald Eagles (Independent) (1929–1930)
| 1929 | Lock Haven | 2–5 | | | |
| 1930 | Lock Haven | 7–1 | | | |
| Lock Haven: | | 8–6 | | | |
Murray State Thoroughbreds (Southern Intercollegiate Athletic Association) (1931)
| 1931 | Murray State | 5–3–1 | 2–2 | T–14th | |
| Murray State: | | 5–3–1 | 2–2 | | |
| Total: | | 20–21–1 | | | |
