= Alberto Ramírez (footballer, born 1941) =

Peruvian footballer

Personal information
- Date of birth: 3 January 1941 (age 85)
- Place of birth: Lima, Peru
- Height: 1.62 m (5 ft 4 in)
- Position: Forward

International career
Years	Team	Apps	(Gls)
- Peru

Alberto Ramírez (born 3 January 1941) is a Peruvian former footballer. He competed in the men's tournament at the 1960 Summer Olympics.
