= Nicolas Nieri =

Peruvian footballer (1939-2017)

Nicolás Nieri
Personal information
- Full name: Nicolás Ricardo Nieri Valle
- Date of birth: 6 December 1939
- Place of birth: Lima, Peru
- Date of death: 23 March 2017 (aged 77)
- Height: 1.73 m (5 ft 8 in)
- Position: Midfielder

Senior career*
| Years | Team | Apps | (Gls) |
| 1957 | Sport Victoria | | |
| 1958–1962 | Sporting Cristal | | |
| 1963–1964 | Sport Boys | | |
| 1965–1969 | Sporting Cristal | | |
| 1970–1973 | Defensor Lima | | |
| 1974 | Atlético Barrio Frigorífico | | |

International career
- Peru
- * Club domestic league appearances and goals

Nicolás Nieri (6 December 1939 – 23 March 2017) was a Peruvian footballer. He competed in the 1959 South American Championship (Argentina) and men's tournament at the 1960 Summer Olympics.
