= Yvon Quédec =

French footballer (born 1939)

Personal information
- Date of birth: 8 January 1939 (age 87)
- Place of birth: Boulogne-Billancourt, France

International career
| Years | Team | Apps | (Gls) |
- France

Yvon Quédec (born 8 January 1939) is a French former footballer. He competed in the men's tournament at the 1960 Summer Olympics.
