= Ángel Uribe =

Peruvian footballer (1943-2008)

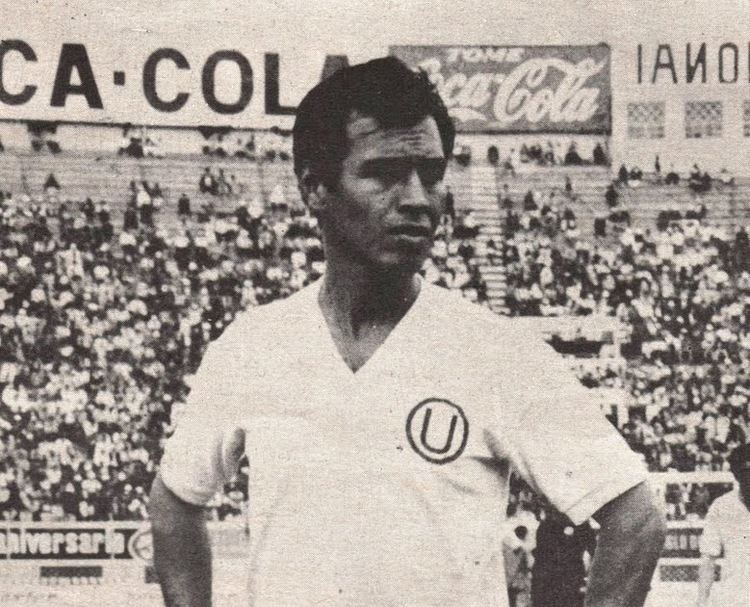
- Uribe in 1965

Personal information
- Full name: Ángel Uribe Sánchez
- Date of birth: 25 November 1938
- Place of birth: Lima, Peru
- Date of death: 17 October 2008 (aged 69)
- Place of death: Lima, Peru
- Height: 1.72 m (5 ft 7 1/2 in)
- Position: Forward

Youth career
- Universitario

Senior career*
Years	Team	Apps	(Gls)
1959–1973	Universitario		

International career
1960–1967	Peru	10	(2)
- * Club domestic league appearances and goals

Ángel Uribe Sánchez (25 November 1938 in Ancón, Lima – 17 October 2008 in Ancón Lima) was a football forward player from Peru who played his entire club career for Universitario de Deportes. Uribe also played for the Peru national team on ten occasions between 1960 and 1967. He was part of Peru's squad at the 1960 Summer Olympics.

Uribe died of bone cancer in October 2008.

== See also ==
- One-club man
