= France Olympic football team =

Men's football team representing France

France Olympic
- Nickname(s): Les Bleus (The Blues); Les Tricolores (The Tricolors)
- Association: Fédération Française de Football (FFF)
- Confederation: UEFA (Europe)
- FIFA code: FRA
First colours	Second colours

First international
- France 2–1 India (London, England; 31 July 1948)

Biggest win
- France 7–0 Dominican Republic (Toulon, France; 11 July 2024)

Biggest defeat
- France 0–7 Hungary (Rome, Italy; 1 September 1960)

Summer Olympic Games
- Appearances: 9 (first in 1948)
- Best result: Gold medalists (1984)
Medal record
Gold medal – first place	1984 Los Angeles	Team
Silver medal – second place	2024 Paris	Team

The France Olympic football team, also known as the France national under-23 football team, represents France in men's international football competitions in Olympic Games. It has been active since 1948, and first competed in 1948. Olympic football was originally an amateur sport, and as the pre-World War II France national team was also amateur, it was able to send a team to the games. The rules on amateurism were relaxed in the 1980s, which allowed France some success, notably a gold medal finish in 1984. Since 1992 the tournament has been competed by under-23 teams, making France's Olympic qualification dependent on the results of the under-21 team. Only in 2020 the French returned to the Olympic stage after a 24-year absence.

== Results and fixtures ==
Legend

Win Draw Lose Voided or Postponed Fixture

== Players ==
=== Current squad ===
The following players were called up for the 2024 Olympic Games, including three overage players in Alexandre Lacazette, Loïc Badé and Jean-Philippe Mateta.

Note: Names in italics denote players that have been capped by the senior team.

Caps and goals as of 9 August 2024, after the team's match against Spain.

No.	Pos.	Player	Date of birth (age)	Caps	Goals	Club
1	GK	Obed Nkambadio	7 February 2003 (age 23)	2	0	(French Football Federation) Paris FC
16	GK	Guillaume Restes	11 March 2005 (age 21)	9	0	(French Football Federation) Toulouse
2	DF	Castello Lukeba	17 December 2002 (age 23)	10	0	(German Football Association) RB Leipzig
3	DF	Adrien Truffert	20 November 2001 (age 24)	10	0	(French Football Federation) Rennes
4	DF	Loïc Badé	11 April 2000 (age 26)	8	1	(Royal Spanish Football Federation) Sevilla
5	DF	Kiliann Sildillia	16 May 2002 (age 24)	10	1	(German Football Association) SC Freiburg
15	DF	Bradley Locko	6 May 2002 (age 24)	6	0	(French Football Federation) Brest
17	DF	Soungoutou Magassa	8 October 2003 (age 23)	7	0	(French Football Federation) Monaco (Note: Monaco is a Monégasque club playing in the French football league system.)
19	DF	Chrislain Matsima	19 May 2002 (age 24)	3	0	(French Football Federation) Monaco
6	MF	Manu Koné	17 May 2001 (age 25)	9	0	(Italian Football Federation) Roma
8	MF	Maghnes Akliouche	25 February 2002 (age 24)	10	2	(French Football Federation) Monaco
11	MF	Désiré Doué	3 June 2005 (age 21)	10	3	(French Football Federation) Paris Saint-Germain
12	MF	Enzo Millot	17 July 2002 (age 24)	8	2	(German Football Association) VfB Stuttgart
13	MF	Joris Chotard	24 September 2001 (age 25)	9	0	(French Football Federation) Montpellier
20	MF	Andy Diouf	17 May 2003 (age 23)	5	1	(French Football Federation) Lens
21	MF	Johann Lepenant	22 October 2002 (age 24)	1	0	(French Football Federation) Lyon
7	FW	Michael Olise	12 December 2001 (age 24)	9	5	(German Football Association) Bayern Munich
9	FW	Arnaud Kalimuendo	20 January 2002 (age 24)	10	3	(French Football Federation) Rennes
10	FW	Alexandre Lacazette (captain)	28 May 1991 (age 35)	8	3	(Saudi Arabian Football Federation) Neom
14	FW	Jean-Philippe Mateta	28 June 1997 (age 29)	8	7	(The Football Association) Crystal Palace
18	FW	Rayan Cherki	17 August 2003 (age 23)	8	2	(The Football Association) Manchester City

Unenrolled alternate players
No.	Pos.	Player	Date of birth (age)	Caps	Goals	Club
22	GK	Théo De Percin	2 February 2001 (age 25)	0	0	(French Football Federation) Auxerre

=== Recent call-ups ===
The following players have also been called up to the France Olympic squad and remain eligible:

Pos.	Player	Date of birth (age)	Caps	Goals	Club	Latest call-up
GK	Robin Risser	2 December 2004 (age 21)	0	0	(France) Strasbourg	2024 Olympic Games^{INJ}
GK	Lucas Chevalier	6 November 2001 (age 25)	1	0	(France) Paris Saint-Germain	2024 Olympic Games^{WD}
DF	Maxime Estève	26 May 2002 (age 24)	1	0	(England) Burnley	2024 Olympic Games^{WD}
DF	Bafodé Diakité	6 January 2001 (age 25)	2	0	(France) Lille	2024 Olympic Games^{WD}
DF	Leny Yoro	13 November 2005 (age 20)	1	0	(England) Manchester United	2024 Olympic Games^{WD}
DF	Malo Gusto	19 May 2003 (age 23)	0	0	(England) Chelsea	v. Ivory Coast, 22 March 2024 ^{INJ}
MF	Lesley Ugochukwu	26 March 2004 (age 22)	2	0	(England) Chelsea	2024 Olympic Games^{WD}
MF	Khéphren Thuram	26 March 2001 (age 25)	2	0	(Italy) Juventus	2024 Olympic Games^{WD}
MF	Warren Zaïre-Emery	8 March 2006 (age 20)	0	0	(France) Paris Saint-Germain	2024 Olympic Games^{WD}
FW	Bradley Barcola	2 September 2002 (age 24)	1	0	(France) Paris Saint-Germain	2024 Olympic Games^{WD}
FW	Mathys Tel	27 April 2005 (age 21)	0	0	(Germany) Bayern Munich	2024 Olympic Games^{WD}
FW	Wilson Odobert	28 November 2004 (age 21)	2	1	(England) Tottenham Hotspur	v. United States, 25 March 2024
FW	Elye Wahi	2 January 2003 (age 23)	2	0	(France) Lens	v. United States, 25 March 2024
FW	Georginio Rutter	20 April 2002 (age 24)	0	0	(England) Leeds United	v. Ivory Coast, 22 March 2024 ^{INJ}
Notes: ^{INJ} Withdrew due to injury; ^{PRE} Preliminary squad / standby; ^{WD} Withdrew due to non-injury issue

=== Overage players in Olympic Games ===
Tournament	Player 1	Player 2	Player 3
1996	did not select		
2020	André-Pierre Gignac (FW)	Téji Savanier (MF)	Florian Thauvin (FW)
2024	Loïc Badé (DF)	Alexandre Lacazette (FW)	Jean-Philippe Mateta (FW)

== Summer Olympics record ==
Gold medalists Silver medalists Bronze medalists

Since the 1992 Summer Olympics, teams consist of under-23 players, with the possibility of three players over the age of 23 being selected. The 1960 Summer Olympics mark the moment FIFA no longer consider Olympic matches to be played by national A teams. Before the 1984 Summer Olympics, only amateur footballers could participate. In fact, some countries fielded teams that were very similar to their A teams since their players were considered amateur.

Summer Olympics										Qualification						
Year	Host	Round	Pld	W	D	L	F	A	Squad	Pos.	Pld	W	D	L	F	A
1900 to 1936		See France national football team								See France national football team						
1948	United Kingdom	Second round	2	1	0	1	3	3	Squad	Invited						
1952	Finland	Preliminary round	1	0	0	1	1	2	Squad	Invited						
1956	Australia	Did not enter								Did not enter						
1960	Italy	Group stage	3	1	1	1	3	9	Squad	1st	4	3	0	1	7	6
1964	Japan	Did not qualify								R1	2	0	0	2	2	8
1968	Mexico	Quarter-finals	4	2	0	2	9	7	Squad	F	4	2	2	0	8	4
1972	West Germany	Did not qualify								2nd	6	3	1	2	11	9
1976	Canada	Quarter-finals	4	2	1	1	9	7	Squad	1st	4	3	0	1	11	5
1980	Soviet Union	Did not qualify								3rd	4	1	1	2	7	9
1984	United States	Gold medal	6	4	2	0	13	6	Squad	1st	6	4	2	0	9	3
1988	South Korea	Did not qualify								5th	8	1	3	4	9	16
1992	Spain	Did not qualify								See France under-21 team						
1996	United States	Quarter-finals	4	2	1	1	6	4	Squad	See France under-21 team						
2000	Australia	Did not qualify								See France under-21 team						
2004	Greece	Did not qualify								See France under-21 team						
2008	China	Did not qualify								See France under-21 team						
2012	United Kingdom	Did not qualify								See France under-21 team						
2016	Brazil	Did not qualify								See France under-21 team						
2020	Japan	Group stage	3	1	0	2	5	11	Squad	See France under-21 team						
2024	France	Silver medal	6	5	0	1	14	6	Squad	Qualified as hosts						
2028	United States	To be determined								See France under-21 team						
Total		Gold medal	33	18	5	10	63	55	—	4/8	38	17	9	12	64	60

== Coaching history ==
- (France) FFF Committee: 1900 – Paris & 1908 – London
- (England) Fred Pentland: 1920 – Brussels
- (England) Charles Griffiths: 1924 – Paris
- (Scotland) Peter Farmer: 1928 – Amsterdam
- (France) FFF Committee: 1948 – London & 1952 – Helsinki
- (France) Jean Rigal: 1960 – Rome
- (France) André Grillon: 1968 – Mexico City
- (France) Gaby Robert: 1976 – Montreal
- (France) Henri Michel: 1984 – Los Angeles
- (France) Raymond Domenech: 1996 – Atlanta
- (France) Sylvain Ripoll: 2020 – Tokyo
- (France) Thierry Henry: 2024 – Paris

== Honours ==
- Olympic Games

Gold medalists: 1984
Silver medalists: 2024

== See also ==
- Sport in France
  - Football in France
    - Women's football in France
- France national football team
- France national football B team
- France national under-21 football team
- France women's national football team
