= Football at the 1960 Summer Olympics – Men's team squads =

The following squads were named for the 1960 Summer Olympics tournament.

== Group A ==
=== Bulgaria ===
Head coach: Stoyan Ormandzhiev

Pos.	Player	DoB	Age	Caps	Club	Tournament games	Tournament goals	Minutes played	Sub off	Sub on	Cards yellow/red
FW	Stefan Abadzhiev	July 3, 1934	26	?	(Bulgaria) FD Levski Sofia
FW	Spiro Debarski	December 8, 1933	26	?	(Bulgaria) FD Lokomotiv Sofia
MF	Todor Diev	September 28, 1934	25	?	(Bulgaria) Spartak Sofia
DF	Ivan Dimitrov	May 14, 1935	25	?	(Bulgaria) FD Lokomotiv Sofia
FW	Nikola Tsanev	December 11, 1939	19	?	(Bulgaria) CDNA Sofia
FW	Hristo Iliev	May 11, 1936	24	?	(Bulgaria) FD Levski Sofia
DF	Ilia Kirchev	December 28, 1932	27	?	(Bulgaria) Spartak Varna
DF	Stoyan Kitov	August 27, 1938	22	?	(Bulgaria) Spartak Sofia
FW	Ivan Kolev	November 1, 1930	29	?	(Bulgaria) CDNA Sofia
MF	Nikola Kovachev	June 4, 1934	26	?	(Bulgaria) CDNA Sofia
DF	Dimitar Largov	September 10, 1936	23	?	(Bulgaria) Slavia Sofia
DF	Manol Manolov	August 4, 1925	35	?	(Bulgaria) CDNA Sofia
GK	Georgi Spirov Naydenov	December 21, 1931	29	?	(Bulgaria) CDNA Sofia
GK	Georgi Yordanov Naydenov	January 28, 1936	24	?	(Bulgaria)
MF	Dimitar Dimitrov	November 1, 1929	30	?	(Bulgaria)
GK	Nikola Parshanov	February 16, 1934	26	?	(Bulgaria) Spartak Pleven
MF	Dimitar Dimov			?	(Bulgaria)
DF	Kiril Rakarov	May 24, 1932	28	?	(Bulgaria) CDNA Sofia
FW	Dimitar Yakimov	August 12, 1941	19	?	(Bulgaria) Septemvri Sofia
MF	Nikola Nikolov	December 5,1939	20	?	(Bulgaria)

=== Turkey ===
Head coach: Şeref Görkey

Pos.	Player	DoB	Age	Caps	Club	Tournament games	Tournament goals	Minutes played	Sub off	Sub on	Cards yellow/red
MF	Asım Bayrak			?	(Turkey) Vefa S.K.
DF	Aydoğan Çipiloğlu	1935		?	(Turkey) Altınordu S.K.
DF	Mustafa Ertan	1926		?	(Turkey) Beşiktaş J.K.
GK	Cavit Gökalp	1938		?	(Turkey) Beşiktaş J.K.
MF	Uğur Köken	1937		?	(Turkey) Galatasaray S.K.
GK	Emrullah Küçükbay			?	(Turkey) Eskişehirspor
MF	Naim Özaytaç	1941		?	(Turkey) İzmir Denizgücü
MF	Suat Özyazıcı	1936		?	(Turkey) İdmanocağı
FW	Zeki Şensan	1937		?	(Turkey) Karşıyaka S.K.
DF	Selim Soydan	1941		?	(Turkey) Beşiktaş J.K.
FW	Bilge Tarhan	1942		?	(Turkey) İstanbulspor
DF	Ergun Taner	1936		?	(Turkey) Şekerhilal SK
MF	Ahmet Tuna Kozan	1943		?	(Turkey) Bursaspor
MF	Yılmaz Tuncer	1931		?
MF	Samin Uygun	1939		?	(Turkey) Galatasaray S.K.
FW	İbrahim Yalçınkaya	1941		?	(Turkey) Vefa S.K.
MF	Turhan Yıldız	1940		?	(Turkey) Harbokulu

=== United Arab Republic ===
Head coach: (Hungary) Pál Titkos

Pos.	Player	DoB	Age	Caps	Club	Tournament games	Tournament goals	Minutes played	Sub off	Sub on	Cards yellow/red
FW	Raafat Attia	February 6, 1934	26	?	(United Arab Republic) Zamalek
MF	Ali Badawi	October 3,1940	19	?
DF	Amin El-Esnawi	June 23,1936	24	?
MF	Rifaat El-Fanagily	May 1, 1936	24	?	(United Arab Republic) Al-Ahly
FW	Mahmoud El-Gohary	February 20, 1938	22	?	(United Arab Republic) Al-Ahly
FW	Alaa El-Hamouly	July 4, 1930	30	?	(United Arab Republic) Zamalek
DF	Mimi El-Sherbini	July 26, 1937	23	?	(United Arab Republic) Al-Ahly
GK	Adel Hekal	March 23,1934	26	?	(United Arab Republic) Al-Ahly
MF	Mohamed Morsi Hussein	April 8,1939	21	?
GK	Fathi Khorshid	December 11,1937	22	?
MF	Samir Qotb	March 16, 1938	22	?	(United Arab Republic) Zamalek
FW	Nabil Nosair	October 11, 1938	21	?	(United Arab Republic) Zamalek
MF	Abdou Noshi	September 1,1939	20	?	(United Arab Republic) Zamalek
MF	Mohamed Rifai	August 7,1939	21	?	(United Arab Republic) Zamalek
MF	Saleh Selim	September 11, 1930	29	?	(United Arab Republic) Al-Ahly
FW	Tariq Selim	July 15, 1937	23	?	(United Arab Republic) Al-Ahly
MF	Yaken Zaki	September 12, 1934	25	?	(United Arab Republic) Zamalek

=== Yugoslavia ===
Head coach: Aleksandar Tirnanić

Pos.	Player	DoB	Age	Caps	Club	Tournament games	Tournament goals	Minutes played	Sub off	Sub on	Cards yellow/red
FW	Andrija Anković	July 16, 1937	23	?	(Socialist Federal Republic of Yugoslavia) Hajduk Split
DF	Zvonko Bego	December 12, 1940	19	?	(Socialist Federal Republic of Yugoslavia) Hajduk Split
DF	Vladimir Durković	November 6, 1937	22	?	(Socialist Federal Republic of Yugoslavia) Red Star Belgrade
FW	Milan Galić	March 8, 1938	22	?	(Socialist Federal Republic of Yugoslavia) FK Partizan
DF	Fahrudin Jusufi	December 8, 1939	20	?	(Socialist Federal Republic of Yugoslavia) FK Partizan
FW	Tomislav Knez	June 9, 1938	22	?	(Socialist Federal Republic of Yugoslavia) Borac Banja Luka
FW	Borivoje Kostić	June 14, 1930	30	?	(Socialist Federal Republic of Yugoslavia) Red Star Belgrade
MF	Aleksandar Kozlina	December 21, 1938	21	?	(Socialist Federal Republic of Yugoslavia) Hajduk Split
MF	Dušan Maravić	March 7, 1939	21	?	(Socialist Federal Republic of Yugoslavia) Red Star Belgrade
MF	Željko Matuš	August 9, 1935	25	?	(Socialist Federal Republic of Yugoslavia) NK Dinamo Zagreb
DF	Žarko Nikolić	October 16, 1938	21	?	(Socialist Federal Republic of Yugoslavia) FK Vojvodina
MF	Željko Perušić	March 23, 1937	23	?	(Socialist Federal Republic of Yugoslavia) NK Dinamo Zagreb
DF	Novak Roganović	January 14, 1932	28	?	(Socialist Federal Republic of Yugoslavia) FK Vojvodina
DF	Velimir Sombolac	February 27, 1939	21	?	(Socialist Federal Republic of Yugoslavia) FK Partizan
GK	Milutin Šoškić	December 31, 1937	22	?	(Socialist Federal Republic of Yugoslavia) FK Partizan
MF	Silvester Takač	November 8, 1940	19	?	(Socialist Federal Republic of Yugoslavia) FK Vojvodina
GK	Blagoje Vidinić	June 11, 1934	26	?	(Socialist Federal Republic of Yugoslavia) FK Radnički Beograd
DF	Ante Žanetić	November 18, 1936	23	?	(Socialist Federal Republic of Yugoslavia) Hajduk Split

== Group B ==
=== Brazil ===
Head coach: Vicente Feola

Pos.	Player	DoB	Age	Caps	Club	Tournament games	Tournament goals	Minutes played	Sub off	Sub on	Cards yellow/red
DF	Brandão	November 22, 1941	18	?	(Brazil) Santos FC
GK	Carlos Alberto	January 25, 1932	28	?	(Brazil) Portuguesa
FW	China	September 11, 1939	20	?	(Brazil) Botafogo
FW	Chiquinho	January 27, 1941	19	?	(Brazil) Yuracan
DF	Dary	October 20, 1940	19	?	(Brazil) Fluminense
DF	Décio	December 28, 1941	18	?	(Brazil) América (MG)
GK	Edmar	January 31, 1941	19	?	(Brazil) Flamengo
MF	Gérson	January 11, 1941	19	?	(Brazil) Flamengo
DF	Gil	September 10, 1938	21	?	(Brazil) Palmeiras
MF	Ivan Brondi	October 7, 1941	18	?	(Brazil) Botafogo
MF	Jonas	July 22, 1943	18	?	(Brazil) São Paulo FC
DF	Jurandir	December 19, 1938	21	?	(Brazil) Marília
DF	Nonô	February 13, 1940	20	?	(Brazil) Fluminense
FW	Paulinho Ferreira	January 14, 1940	20	?	(Brazil) Palmeiras
DF	Roberto Dias	January 7, 1943	17	?	(Brazil) São Paulo FC
DF	Rubens	June 16, 1941	19	?	(Brazil) Fluminense
FW	Valdir	November 11, 1937	22	?	(Brazil) Nacional (SP)
FW	Wanderley	June 3, 1938	22	?	(Brazil) Vasco

=== Formosa ===
Head coach: (Taiwan) Lee Wai Tong

No.	Pos.	Player	Date of birth (age)	Caps	Club
	GK	Lau Kin-chung (劉建中)	29 May 1932 (aged 28)		(Hong Kong) South China
	GK	Yong Poi Dor (翁培佐)	28 June 1929 (aged 31)		(Hong Kong) Eastern
	DF	Lam Sheung Yee (林尚義)	7 November 1934 (aged 25)		(Hong Kong) Kitchee
	DF	Law Pak (羅北)	25 May 1933 (aged 27)		(Hong Kong) Kowloon Motor Bus
	DF	Chan Fai Hung (陳輝洪)	5 May 1932 (aged 28)		(Hong Kong) Kitchee
	DF	Ng Wai Man (吳偉文)	30 November 1932 (aged 27)		(Hong Kong) Eastern
	MF	Lau Tim (劉添)	1 January 1934 (aged 26)		(Hong Kong) Kowloon Motor Bus
	DF	Kwok Kam-hung (郭錦洪)	13 May 1934 (aged 26)		(Hong Kong) South China
	MF	Szeto Man (司徒文)	16 December 1930 (aged 29)		(Hong Kong) Happy Valley
	MF	Yeung Wai Too (楊偉韜)	13 August 1932 (aged 28)		(Hong Kong) Sing Tao
	MF	Wong Man-wai (黃文偉)	23 September 1943 (aged 16)		(Hong Kong) Happy Valley
	MF	Wong Chi-keung	8 July 1936 (aged 24)		(Hong Kong) South China
	FW	Cheung Chi Doy (張子岱)	30 July 1941 (aged 19)		(Hong Kong) Tung Wah
	FW	Law Kwok Tai (羅國泰)	5 August 1929 (aged 31)		(Hong Kong) Eastern
	FW	Mok Chun Wah (莫振華)	5 May 1929 (aged 31)		(Hong Kong) South China
	FW	Chow Shiu-hung (周少雄)	15 January 1935 (aged 25)		(Hong Kong) Yuen Long
	FW	Kwok Yau (郭有)	24 September 1927 (aged 32)		(Hong Kong) Tung Wah
	FW	Yiu Cheuk Yin (姚卓然)	3 July 1928 (aged 32)		(Hong Kong) South China

=== Great Britain ===
Head coach: (England) Norman Creek

No.	Pos.	Player	Date of birth (age)	Caps	Club
9	FW	Hugh Barr	17 May 1935 (aged 25)		(Northern Ireland) Ballymena United
7	MF	Laurie Brown	22 August 1937 (aged 23)		(England) Bishop Auckland
5	MF	Leslie Brown	27 November 1936 (aged 23)		(England) Dulwich Hamlet
11	FW	Bobby Brown	2 May 1940 (aged 20)		(England) Barnet
8	MF	Arnold Coates	24 July 1936 (aged 24)		(England) Evenwood Town
14	FW	John Devine	1 December 1935 (aged 24)		(Scotland) Queen's Park
16	MF	Hugh Forde	31 January 1936 (aged 24)		(Northern Ireland) Glenavon
2	DF	Michael Greenwood (c)	9 April 1935 (aged 25)		(England) Bishop Auckland
17	FW	Paddy Hasty	17 March 1934 (aged 26)		(England) Tooting & Mitcham United
3	DF	David Holt	3 January 1936 (aged 24)		(Scotland) Queen's Park
19	FW	Terence Howard	13 September 1937 (aged 22)		(England) Hendon
12	FW	Jim Lewis	26 June 1927 (aged 33)		(England) Walthamstow Avenue
18	FW	Hugh Lindsay	23 August 1938 (aged 22)		(England) Kingstonian
4	DF	Ron McKinven	8 January 1936 (aged 24)		(Scotland) St Johnstone
6	DF	Billy Neil	22 May 1939 (aged 21)		(Scotland) Airdrieonians
13	GK	Mike Pinner	16 February 1934 (aged 26)		(England) Queen's Park Rangers
10	MF	Roy Sleap	5 September 1940 (aged 19)		(England) Barnet
15	DF	Tommy Thompson	9 March 1938 (aged 22)		(England) Stockton
1	GK	John Wakefield	21 September 1934 (aged 25)		(England) Corinthian-Casuals

=== Italy ===
Head coach: Giuseppe Viani

Pos.	Player	DoB	Age	Caps	Club	Tournament games	Tournament goals	Minutes played	Sub off	Sub on	Cards yellow/red
GK	Luciano Alfieri	March 30, 1936	24	?	(Italy) A.C. Milan
GK	Giandomenico Baldisseri	February 20, 1938	22	?	(Italy) A.C. Reggiana 1919
FW	Giacomo Bulgarelli	October 24, 1940	19	?	(Italy) Bologna F.C. 1909
DF	Tarcisio Burgnich	April 25, 1939	21	?	(Italy) Udinese Calcio
DF	Giancarlo Cella	September 5, 1940	19	?	(Italy) Inter
MF	Giovanni Fanello	February 20, 1939	21	?	(Italy) U.S. Catanzaro
MF	Armando Favalli	May 20, 1939	21	?	(Italy) Brescia Calcio
MF	Giorgio Ferrini	August 19, 1939	21	?	(Italy) Torino F.C.
FW	Luciano Magistrelli	February 14, 1938	22	?	(Italy) U.S. Triestina Calcio
MF	Gilberto Noletti	May 9, 1941	19	?	(Italy) A.C. Milan
MF	Ambrogio Pelagalli	February 15, 1940	20	?	(Italy) A.C. Milan
MF	Orazio Rancati	March 9, 1940	20	?	(Italy) Inter
MF	Gianni Rivera	August 18, 1943	17	?	(Italy) U.S. Alessandria Calcio 1912
FW	Giorgio Rossano	March 20, 1939	21	?	(Italy) Juventus FC
DF	Sandro Salvadore	November 29, 1939	20	?	(Italy) A.C. Milan
MF	Ugo Tomeazzi	December 24, 1940	19	?	(Italy) Modena F.C.
DF	Giovanni Trapattoni	March 17, 1939	21	?	(Italy) A.C. Milan
DF	Mario Trebbi	September 9, 1939	20	?	(Italy) A.C. Milan
MF	Paride Tumburus	March 8, 1939	21	?	(Italy) Bologna F.C. 1909

== Group C ==
=== Argentina ===
Head coach: Ernesto Duchini

Pos.	Player	DoB	Age	Caps	Club	Tournament games	Tournament goals	Minutes played	Sub off	Sub on	Cards yellow/red
MF	Carlos Bilardo	March 16, 1939	21	?	(Argentina) San Lorenzo
DF	Roberto Blanco	November 26, 1938	21	?	(Argentina) Racing
FW	Roberto Bonnano	March 16, 1938	22	?	(Argentina) Vélez Sarsfield
DF	Pedro de Ciancio	February 16, 1938	22	?	(Argentina) Racing
FW	Mario Desiderio	February 1, 1938	22	?	(Argentina) Estudiantes (LP)
DF	José Díaz	April 20, 1938	22	?	(Argentina) Lanús
FW	Salvador Ginel	April 1, 1938	22	?	(Argentina) Club Atlético Tucumán
DF	Carlos Enrique Grudiña	December 29, 1938	21	?	(Argentina) Huracán
MF	Domingo Lejona	February 2, 1938	22	?	(Argentina) Gimnasia (LP)
FW	Guillermo Lorenzo	January 5, 1939	21	?	(Argentina) Boca Juniors
DF	Julio Mattos	March 30, 1940	20	?	(Argentina) Argentinos Juniors
FW	Juan Carlos Oleniak	March 4, 1942	18	?	(Argentina) Racing
FW	Raúl Adolfo Pérez	November 11, 1939	20	?	(Argentina) Boca Juniors
GK	Marwell Periotti	May 25, 1939	21	?	(Argentina) San Lorenzo
MF	Alberto Rendo	January 3, 1940	20	?	(Argentina) Huracán
GK	Carlos Pascual Saldías	February 25, 1939	21	?	(Argentina) Sacachispas Futbol Club
DF	Juan Carlos Stauskas	August 6, 1939	21	?	(Argentina) River Plate
MF	Hugo Zarich	March 17, 1940	20	?	(Argentina) River Plate

=== Denmark ===
Head coach: Arne Sørensen

Pos.	Player	DoB	Age	Caps	Club	Tournament games	Tournament goals	Minutes played	Sub off	Sub on	Cards yellow/red
FW	Poul Andersen	January 2, 1930	30	?	(Denmark) Skovshoved IF
FW	John Danielsen	July 13, 1939	21	?	(Denmark) B 1909
FW	Henning Enoksen	September 26, 1935	24	?	(Denmark) Vejle BK
GK	Henry From	June 1, 1926	34	?	(Denmark) AGF
GK	Erik Gaardhøje	November 2, 1938	21	?	(Denmark) Esbjerg fB
DF	Bent Hansen	September 13, 1933	26	?	(Denmark) B 1903
FW	Jørgen Hansen	December 24, 1931	28	?	(Denmark) Næstved IF
DF	Henning Helbrandt	May 30,1935	25	?	(Denmark) KB
DF	Poul Jensen	March 28, 1934	26	?	(Denmark) Vejle BK
MF	Bent Krog	March 31, 1935	25	?	(Denmark) KB
FW	Erling Linde Larsen	November 9, 1931	28	?	(Denmark) B 1909
FW	Poul Mejer	November 2, 1931	28	?	(Denmark) Vejle BK
MF	Flemming Nielsen	February 24, 1934	26	?	(Denmark) AB
FW	Hans Christian Nielsen	May 10, 1928	32	?	(Denmark) AGF
FW	Harald Nielsen	October 26, 1941	18	?	(Denmark) Frederikshavn fI
FW	Poul Pedersen	October 31, 1932	27	?	(Denmark) AIA
FW	Jørn Sørensen	October 17, 1936	23	?	(Denmark) KB
GK	Finn Sterobo	December 17, 1933	26	?	(Denmark) OB
FW	Tommy Troelsen	July 10, 1940	20	?	(Denmark) Vejle BK

=== Poland ===
Head coaches: (Poland) Czesław Krug; trainers (France) Jean Prouff and (Poland) Ryszard Koncewicz

Pos.	Player	DoB	Age	Caps	Club	Tournament games	Tournament goals	Minutes played	Sub off	Sub on	Cards yellow/red
FW	Lucjan Brychczy	June 13, 1934	26	?	(Poland) Legia Warsaw
FW	Eugeniusz Faber	April 6, 1939	21	?	(Poland) Ruch Chorzów
DF	Stefan Florenski	December 17, 1933	26	?	(Poland) Górnik Zabrze
GK	Stanisław Fołtyn	July 25, 1936	24	?	(Poland) Legia Warsaw
FW	Zygmunt Gadecki	January 21, 1938	22	?	(Poland) Legia Warsaw
MF	Ryszard Grzegorczyk	September 20, 1939	20	?	(Poland) Polonia Bytom
DF	Henryk Grzybowski	July 17, 1934	26	?	(Poland) Legia Warsaw
FW	Stanisław Hachorek	January 21, 1927	33	?	(Poland) Gwardia Warszawa
FW	Engelbert Jarek	June 7, 1935	25	?	(Poland) Odra Opole
FW	Roman Lentner	December 15, 1937	22	?	(Poland) Górnik Zabrze
FW	Marian Norkowski	May 17, 1935	25	?	(Poland) Polonia Bydgoszcz
FW	Hubert Pala	September 4, 1933	26	?	(Poland) Ruch Chorzów
FW	Ernest Pol	November 3, 1932	27	?	(Poland) Górnik Zabrze
GK	Tomasz Stefaniszyn	March 16, 1929	31	?	(Poland) Gwardia Warszawa
MF	Marceli Strzykalski	February 19, 1931	29	?	(Poland) Legia Warsaw
MF	Henryk Szczepański	October 7, 1933	26	?	(Poland) ŁKS Łódź
GK	Edward Szymkowiak	February 13, 1932	28	?	(Poland) Polonia Bytom
DF	Jerzy Woźniak	December 27, 1932	27	?	(Poland) Legia Warsaw
MF	Edmund Zientara	January 25, 1929	31	?	(Poland) Legia Warsaw

=== Tunisia ===
Head coach: (Socialist Federal Republic of Yugoslavia) Milan Kristić

No.	Pos.	Player	Date of birth (age)	Caps	Club
	GK	Mohammed Ayachi	31 March 1934 (aged 26)		(Tunisia) Stade Soussien
	FW	Abderrahman Ben Azzedine	25 December 1933 (aged 26)		(Tunisia) Espérance ST
	DF	Taoufik Ben Othman	24 March 1939 (aged 21)		(Tunisia) Étoile Sahel
	FW	Noureddine "Diwa" Ben Yahmed	26 February 1937 (aged 23)		(Tunisia) Stade Tunisien
	FW	Moncef Chérif	8 November 1940 (aged 19)		(Tunisia) Stade Tunisien
	DF	Abdelmajid Chetali	4 July 1939 (aged 21)		(Tunisia) Étoile Sahel
	DF	Hamadi Dhaou	10 January 1940 (aged 20)		(Tunisia) Sfax Railways Sports
	MF	Ali Larbi Hanachi	10 October 1936 (aged 23)		(Tunisia) AS Marsa
	GK	Mahmoud Kanoun	21 March 1938 (aged 22)		(Tunisia) Étoile Sahel
	MF	Ali Kelibi	3 September 1942 (aged 17)		(Tunisia) Club Africain
	FW	Brahim Kerrit	2 October 1940 (aged 19)		(Tunisia) Stade Tunisien
	GK	Khalled Loualid	3 March 1941 (aged 19)		(Tunisia) Espérance ST
	MF	Rachid Meddeb	22 October 1940 (aged 19)		(Tunisia) Espérance ST
	FW	Abdel Majid Naji	14 October 1936 (aged 23)		(Tunisia) Espérance ST
	DF	Ridha Rouatbi	7 February 1938 (aged 22)		(Tunisia) Étoile Sahel
	DF	Mohamed Zguir	4 February 1936 (aged 24)		(Tunisia) Stade Tunisien
	MF	Ahmed Sghaïer	2 January 1937 (aged 23)		(Tunisia) US Tunisienne
	FW	Hassen Tasco	6 March 1930 (aged 30)		(Tunisia) CS Hammam-Lif
	FW	Larbi Touati	12 October 1936 (aged 23)		(Tunisia) Club Africain

== Group D ==
=== France ===
Head coach: (France) Jean Rigal

No.	Pos.	Player	Date of birth (age)	Caps	Club
	FW	Ahmed Arab	March 18, 1933		(France) Brive
	MF	Marcel Artelesa	July 2, 1938		(France) Troyes
	MF	Gérard Aygoui	October 5, 1936		(France) Marseille
	DF	Raymond Baratto	January 23, 1934		(France) Reims
	DF	Pierre Bodin	March 23, 1934		(France) RC Paris
	MF	Jean-Baptiste Bordas	January 8, 1938		(France) Saint-Étienne
	FW	Gérard Coinçon	March 18, 1939		(France) Saint-Étienne
	MF	Claude Dubaële	January 19, 1940		(France) Reims
	DF	Jean-Marie Élisé	February 2, 1939		(France) Lens
	DF	François Philippe	November 4, 1930		(France) AS Brest
	FW	André Giamarchi	July 24, 1931		(France) Annecy FC
	DF	Gines Gonzalez	September 11, 1938		(France) Saint-Étienne
	MF	Marcel Loncle	January 5, 1936		(France) Angers
	DF	Louis Polonia	January 8, 1935		(France) Lens
	FW	Yvon Quédec	January 8, 1939		(France) RC Paris
	GK	Charles Samoy	April 30, 1939		(France) CO Roubaix-Tourcoing
	MF	Max Samper	June 29, 1938		(France) RC Paris
	FW	Jacques Stamm	April 4, 1939		(France) Sedan
	GK	Jean Wettestein	March 13, 1933		(France) FC Mulhouse

=== Hungary ===
Head coach: Béla Volentik

Pos.	Player	DoB	Age	Caps	Club	Tournament games	Tournament goals	Minutes played	Sub off	Sub on	Cards yellow/red
FW	Flórián Albert	September 15, 1941	18	?	(Hungary) Ferencvárosi TC
DF	Jenő Dalnoki	December 12, 1932	27	?	(Hungary) Ferencvárosi TC
DF	Zoltán Dudás	August 8, 1936	23	?	(Hungary) Budapest Honvéd FC
FW	János Dunai	June 26, 1937	23	?	(Hungary) Pécsi Dózsa
GK	Lajos Faragó	August 3, 1932	27	?	(Hungary) Budapest Honvéd FC
MF	János Göröcs	May 8, 1939	21	?	(Hungary) Újpesti Dózsa
DF	Ferenc Kovács	January 7, 1934	26	?	(Hungary) MTK Budapest
DF	Kálmán Mészöly	July 16, 1941	19	?	(Hungary) Vasas SC
DF	Dezső Novák	February 3, 1939	21	?	(Hungary) Haladás VSE
MF	Pál Orosz	January 25, 1934	26	?	(Hungary) Ferencvárosi TC
FW	László Pál	September 13, 1937	22	?	(Hungary) Diósgyőri VTK
FW	Tibor Pál	September 15, 1935	24	?	(Hungary) Csepel SC
MF	Gyula Rákosi	October 9, 1938	21	?	(Hungary) Ferencvárosi TC
FW	Imre Sátori	March 7, 1937	23	?	(Hungary) Csepel SC
MF	Ernő Solymosi	June 21, 1940	20	?	(Hungary) Diósgyőri VTK
GK	Antal Szentmihályi	June 13, 1939	21	?	(Hungary) Vasas SC
GK	Gábor Török	May 30, 1936	24	?	(Hungary) Újpesti Dózsa
DF	Pál Várhidi	November 6, 1931	28	?	(Hungary) Újpesti Dózsa
MF	Oszkár Vilezsál	September 17, 1930	29	?	(Hungary) Ferencvárosi TC

=== India ===
Head coach: Syed Abdul Rahim

Pos.	Player	DoB	Age	Caps	Club
FW	Tulsidas Balaram	November 30, 1936	23	?	(India) East Bengal Club
FW	Pradip Kumar Banerjee	June 23, 1936	24	?	(India) Railways
DF	O. Chandrashekar	July 10, 1936	24	?	(India) Bombay
FW	Mundiyath Devdas	March 12, 1935	25	?	(India) Bombay
MF	Fortunato Franco	May 2, 1939	21	?	(India) ICL Bengal Club
DF	Arun Ghosh	July 7, 1941	19	?	(India) Railways
FW	Chuni Goswami	January 15, 1938	22	?	(India) Mohun Bagan AC
FW	Syed Shahid Hakim	June 25, 1939	21	?	(India) Hyderabad
FW	Habibul Hamid	March 11, 1942	18	?	(India) Hyderabad
FW	Dharmalingam Kannan	July 8, 1936	24	?	(India) East Bengal Club
MF	Mariappa Kempaiah	February 10, 1933	27	?	(India) Mohun Bagan AC
FW	Yousuf Khan	August 5, 1937	23	?	(India) Hyderabad Police
MF	Malay Kumar Lahiri	September 20, 1934	25	?	(India) Gorkha Brigade
DF	Shaikh Abdul Latif	May 8, 1934	26	?	(India) Bombay
GK	S. S. Narayan	November 12, 1934	25	?	(India) Tata Sports Club
MF	Ram Bahadur Chettri	February 15, 1937	19	?	(India) East Bengal Club
DF	Jarnail Singh	February 20, 1936	24	?	(India) Mohun Bagan AC
FW	Simon Sundararaj	November 9, 1937	22	?	(India) Railways
GK	Peter Thangaraj	December 24, 1935	24	?	(India) Madras Services

=== Peru ===
Head coach: (Hungary) György Orth

Pos.	Player	DoB	Age	Caps	Club	Tournament games	Tournament goals	Minutes played	Sub off	Sub on	Cards yellow/red
FW	Gerardo Altuna	April 7, 1939	21	?	(Peru) Estrella Roja
MF	Humberto Arguedas	October 31, 1937	22	?	(Peru) Universitario de Deportes
MF	Juan Biselach	August 7, 1940	20	?	(Peru) Centro Iqueño
DF	Víctor Boulanger	July 15, 1940	20	?	(Peru) Atlético Torino
FW	Javier Caceres	September 8, 1939	20	?	(Peru) Sport Boys
DF	Eloy Campos	May 31, 1942	18	?	(Peru) Sporting Cristal
GK	Herminio Campos	April 25, 1937	22	?	(Peru) Academia José Soriano
MF	Hugo Carmona	April 1, 1939	21	?	(Peru) Sporting Cristal
DF	Héctor de Guevara	March 20, 1940	20	?	(Peru) La Salle
MF	Daniel Eral	October 17, 1940	19	?	(Peru) Alianza Lima
FW	Alberto Gallardo	November 28, 1940	19	?	(Peru) Sporting Cristal
FW	Alejandro Guzmán	January 11, 1941	19	?	(Peru) Universitario de Deportes
FW	Tomás Iwasaki	November 13, 1937	22	?	(Peru) Universitario de Deportes
DF	Teodoro Luña	October 29, 1938	21	?	(Peru) Mariscal Sucre
FW	Nicolas Nieri	December 6, 1939	20	?	(Peru) Sporting Cristal
FW	Alberto Ramírez	January 3, 1941	19	?	(Peru) Sporting Cristal
FW	Jaime Ruiz	May 23, 1935	25	?	(Peru) Universitario de Deportes
GK	Carlos Salinas	October 12, 1938	21	?	(Peru) Deportivo Huando
FW	Ángel Uribe	September 29, 1943	16	?	(Peru) Universitario de Deportes
