= Football at the 1960 Summer Olympics – Group 1 =

Football at the Summer Olympics group

Group 1 of the 1960 Summer Olympics football tournament took place from 26 August to 1 September 1960. The group consisted of Yugoslavia, Bulgaria, United Arab Republic and Turkey. The top team, Yugoslavia, advanced to the semi-finals.

== Teams ==
Team	Region	Method of qualification	Date of qualification	Finals appearance	Last appearance	Previous best performance							
Team	Region	Method of qualification	Date of qualification	Finals appearance	Last appearance	Previous best performance	Turkey	Europe	Middle East winners	24 November 1959	7th	1956	Quarter-finals (1948, 1948)
United Arab Republic	Africa	Africa second round winners	3 April 1960	7th	1956	Fourth place (1928)							
Yugoslavia	Europe	Europe Group 4 winners	24 April 1960	6th	1956	Silver medal (1948, 1952, 1956)							
Bulgaria	Europe	Europe Group 3 winners	1 May 1960	3rd	1956	Silver medal (1956)							

== Standings ==
Pos	Team	Pld	W	D	L	GF	GA	GD	Pts	Qualification
1	Yugoslavia	3	2	1	0	13	4	+9	5	Advanced to knockout stage
2	Bulgaria	3	2	1	0	8	3	+5	5	
3	United Arab Republic	3	0	1	2	4	11	−7	1	
4	Turkey	3	0	1	2	3	10	−7	1	

Source: RSSSF

In the semi-finals, the winners of Group 1, Yugoslavia, advanced to play the winner of Group 2, Italy.

== Matches ==
All times listed are local, CET (UTC+1).

=== Bulgaria vs Turkey ===
26 August 1960
21:00

Bulgaria	3–0	Turkey
Diev 13', 58'; Iliev 67'	Report

Stadio Olimpico Carlo Zecchini, Grosseto
Attendance: 3,760
Referee: Cesare Jonni (Italy)

1	Georgi Naidenov
2	Kiril Rakarov
3	Manol Manolov (c)
4	Stoyan Kitov
5	Dimitar Largov
6	Nikola Kovachev
7	Todor Diev	Booked
8	Stefan Abadzhiev
9	Nicolas Dimitrov	Booked
10	Hristo Iliev
11	Dimitar Yakimov
Substitutions:
	Spiro Debarski
	Ivan Dimitrov
	Iliya Kirchev
	Ivan Kolev
	Georgi Naidenov Yordanov
	Dimitar Nikolov
	Nikola Parchanov
	Dimitar Penchev
Manager:
(Bulgaria) Stoyan Ormandzhiev

1	Cavid Gokalp
2	Aydoğan Çipiloğlu
3	Ergun Taner
4	Suat Ozyazici
5	Ahmet Tunakozan
6	Bilge Tarhan	Booked
7	Samin Uygun
10	Ugar Koken
12	İbrahim Yalçınkaya
14	Zeki Şensan	Booked
16	Selin Soydan
Substitutions:
	Emrullah Küçükbay
	Asim Bayrak
	Mustafa Ertan
	Naim Ozaytac
	Yilmaz Tuncer
	Turhan Yıldız
Manager:
(Turkey) Şeref Görkey

Assistant referees:
Giuseppe Adami (Italy)
Piero Angelini (Italy)

=== Yugoslavia vs United Arab Republic ===
26 August 1960
21:00

Yugoslavia	6–1	United Arab Republic
Rifai 3' (o.g.); Galić 30' (pen.); Kostić 32', 61', 63'; Knez 49'	Report	Attia 72'

Stadio Adriatico, Pescara
Attendance: 9,211
Referee: Reg Leafe (Great Britain)

1	Milutin Soskic
2	Vladimir Durković
3	Fahrudin Jusufi
4	Ante Žanetić
5	Novak Roganović
6	Željko Perušić
7	Andrija Anković
8	Dušan Maravić
9	Tomislav Knez
10	Milan Galić (c)
11	Bora Kostić
Substitutions:
	Blagoje Vidinić
	Zvonko Bego
	Aleksandar Kozlina
	Željko Matuš
	Žarko Nikolić
	Velimir Sombolac
	Silvester Takač
Manager:
(Socialist Federal Republic of Yugoslavia) Selection Committee

1	Adel Hekal
2	El Sayed Rifat
3	Alaa El-Hamouly
4	Amin El-Esnawi
5	Rifaat El-Fanagily
6	Samir Qotb
7	Mohamed Morsi Hussein
8	Raafat Attia
9	Tariq Selim
10	Mahmoud El-Gohary
11	Abdelat Elsherbini
Substitutions:
	Fetthi Korshed
	Ali Badawi
	Abdou Noshi
	Nabil Nosseir
	Selim Saleh
	Yakan Hussein
Manager:
(Hungary) Pál Titkos

Assistant referees:
Raymond Morgan (Canada)
Lucien Van Nuffel (Belgium)

=== Bulgaria vs United Arab Republic ===
29 August 1960
21:00

Bulgaria	2–0	United Arab Republic
Naidenov Yordanov 42'; Diev 88'	Report

Stadio Tommaso Fattori, L'Aquila
Attendance: 1,634
Referee: Leo Helge (Denmark)

1	Georgi Naidenov
2	Kiril Rakarov
3	Ivan Dimitrov
4	Dimitar Largov
5	Manol Manolov (c)
6	Nikola Kovachev
7	Todor Diev
8	Stefan Abadzhiev
9	Georgi Naidenov Yordanov
10	Dimitar Yakimov
11	Ivan Kolev
Substitutions:
	Hristo Iliev
	Spiro Debarski
	Nicolas Dimitrov
	Iliya Kirchev
	Dimitar Nikolov
	Nikola Parchanov
	Dimitar Penchev
	Stoyan Kitov
Manager:
(Bulgaria) Stoyan Ormandzhiev

1	Fetthi Korshed
2	Yakan Hussein
3	Ali Badawi
4	Alaa El-Hamouly
5	Rifaat El-Fanagily
6	Samir Qotb
7	Mohamed Morsi Hussein
8	Abdou Noshi
9	Selim Saleh
10	Mahmoud El-Gohary
11	Abdelat Elsherbini
Substitutions:
	Raafat Attia
	Amin El-Esnawi
	Adel Hekal
	Nabil Nosseir
	El Sayed Rifat
	Tariq Selim
Manager:
(Hungary) Pál Titkos

Assistant referees:
Gino Rigato (Italy)
Josef Kandlbinder (West Germany)

=== Yugoslavia vs Turkey ===
29 August 1960
21:00

Yugoslavia	4–0	Turkey
Kostić 10', 89'; Galić 46'; Knez 61'	Report

Stadio Comunale, Florence
Attendance: 1,858
Referee: Vincenzo Orlandini (Italy)

1	Milutin Soskic
2	Vladimir Durković
3	Fahrudin Jusufi
4	Ante Žanetić
6	Željko Perušić
9	Milan Galić (c)
10	Tomislav Knez
11	Bora Kostić
14	Novak Roganović
17	Silvester Takač
18	Dušan Maravić
Substitutions:
	Blagoje Vidinić
	Andrija Anković
	Zvonko Bego
	Aleksandar Kozlina
	Željko Matuš
	Žarko Nikolić
	Velimir Sombolac
Manager:
(Socialist Federal Republic of Yugoslavia) Selection Committee

1	Cavid Gokalp
2	Aydoğan Çipiloğlu
3	Ergun Taner
4	Suat Ozyazici
5	Ahmet Tunakozan
6	Bilge Tarhan	Booked
7	Turhan Yıldız
8	Zeki Şensan
9	İbrahim Yalçınkaya
11	Selin Soydan
14	Mustafa Ertan
Substitutions:
	Emrullah Küçükbay
	Asim Bayrak
	Ugar Koken
	Naim Ozaytac
	Yilmaz Tuncer
	Samin Uygun
Manager:
(Turkey) Şeref Görkey

Assistant referees:
Francesco Liverani (Italy)
Piero Angelini (Italy)

=== Yugoslavia vs Bulgaria ===
1 September 1960
21:00

Yugoslavia	3–3	Bulgaria
Galić 50', 57', 69'	Report	Kovachev 59'; Debarski 81', 89'

Stadio Flaminio, Rome
Attendance: 7,994
Referee: Cesare Jonni (Italy)

1	Milutin Soskic
2	Vladimir Durković
3	Fahrudin Jusufi
4	Ante Žanetić
6	Željko Perušić
9	Milan Galić (c)
10	Tomislav Knez	Booked
11	Bora Kostić	Booked
13	Velimir Sombolac	Booked
16	Aleksandar Kozlina	Booked
18	Dušan Maravić
Substitutions:
	Blagoje Vidinić
	Andrija Anković
	Zvonko Bego
	Željko Matuš
	Žarko Nikolić
	Novak Roganović
	Silvester Takač
Manager:
(Socialist Federal Republic of Yugoslavia) Selection Committee

1	Georgi Naidenov
2	Kiril Rakarov
3	Manol Manolov (c)
4	Ivan Dimitrov
5	Dimitar Largov
6	Nikola Kovachev
7	Todor Diev
8	Stefan Abadzhiev	Booked
9	Hristo Iliev
10	Dimitar Yakimov	Booked
11	Spiro Debarski
Substitutions:
	Nicolas Dimitrov
	Iliya Kirchev
	Ivan Kolev
	Georgi Naidenov Yordanov
	Dimitar Nikolov
	Nikola Parchanov
	Dimitar Penchev
	Stoyan Kitov
Manager:
(Bulgaria) Stoyan Ormandzhiev

Assistant referees:
Piero Angelini (Italy)
Bruno De Marchi (Italy)

=== United Arab Republic vs Turkey ===
1 September 1960
21:00

United Arab Republic	3–3	Turkey
Attia 10'; Qotb 58', 65'	Report	Tahran 15'; Koken 30'; Yalçınkaya 69'

Stadio di Ardenza, Livorno
Referee: Lucien van Nuffel (Belgium)

1	Fetthi Korshed
2	Yakan Hussein
3	Ali Badawi
4	Rifaat El-Fanagily
5	Alaa El-Hamouly
6	Samir Qotb
7	Mahmoud El-Gohary
8	Nabil Nosseir
9	Mohamed Morsi Hussein
10	Raafat Attia
11	Abdelat Elsherbini
Substitutions:
	Amin El-Esnawi
	Adel Hekal
	Abdou Noshi
	El Sayed Rifat
	Selim Saleh
	Tariq Selim
Manager:
(Hungary) Pál Titkos

1	Emrullah Küçükbay
2	Aydoğan Çipiloğlu
3	Ergun Taner
4	Suat Ozyazici
5	Ahmet Tunakozan
6	Mustafa Ertan
7	Samin Uygun
8	Zeki Şensan
9	İbrahim Yalçınkaya
10	Bilge Tarhan
11	Ugar Koken
Substitutions:
	Cavid Gokalp
	Asim Bayrak
	Naim Ozaytac
	Selin Soydan
	Yilmaz Tuncer
	Turhan Yıldız
Manager:
(Turkey) Şeref Görkey

Assistant referees:
Piero Bonetto (Italy)
Carlo Gambarotta (Italy)

== See also ==
- Turkey at the Olympics
- Egypt at the Olympics
- Yugoslavia at the Olympics
- Bulgaria at the Olympics
