= 1960–61 NK Hajduk Split season =

Hajduk Split
1960–61 season
- Chairman: Petar Alfirević
- Manager: Milovan Ćirić
- First League: 5th
- Yugoslav Cup: Runners-up
- Top goalscorer: League: Andrija Anković (15); All: Andrija Anković (18)

The 1960–61 season was the 50th season in Hajduk Split’s history and their 15th in the Yugoslav First League. Their 5th place finish in the 1959–60 season meant it was their 15th successive season playing in the Yugoslav First League.

== Competitions ==
=== Overall ===
Competition	Started round	Final result	First match	Last Match
1960–61 Yugoslav First League	–	3rd	18 August	11 June
1960–61 Yugoslav Cup	First round	Semi-finals	11 December	5 March
1960 Mitropa Cup	–		3 July	10 July

=== Yugoslav First League ===
==== Classification ====
Pos	Team	Pld	W	D	L	GF	GA	GD	Pts	Qualification or relegation
1	Partizan (C)	22	15	2	5	53	23	+30	32	Qualification for European Cup preliminary round
2	Red Star Belgrade	22	13	5	4	38	21	+17	31	Invitation for Inter-Cities Fairs Cup first round
3	Hajduk Split	22	13	4	5	34	22	+12	30	
4	Dinamo Zagreb	22	10	7	5	36	27	+9	27	Invitation for Inter-Cities Fairs Cup first round
5	Vojvodina	22	10	3	9	32	29	+3	23	Invitation for Inter-Cities Fairs Cup first round

Source: rsssf.org
Rules for classification: 1) points; 2) goal difference; 3) number of goals scored.
(C) Champions

== Matches ==
=== Yugoslav First League ===
Round	Date	Venue	Opponent	Score	Hajduk Scorers
1	18 Sep	A	OFK Beograd	1 – 1	Papec
2	25 Sep	H	Velež	2 – 2	Papec, Bego
3	2 Oct	A	Red Star	1 – 2	Anković
4	23 Oct	H	Vardar	3 – 0	Anković (3)
5	30 Oct	A	Vojvodina	1 – 0	Papec
6	6 Nov	H	Partizan	0 – 0	
7	13 Nov	A	Radnički Beograd	2 – 1	Papec (2)
8	20 Nov	H	RNK Split	1 – 1	Bego
9	27 Nov	A	Dinamo Zagreb	4 – 1	Anković (3), Papec
10	30 Nov	A	Sarajevo	0 – 3	
11	4 Dec	H	Rijeka	3 – 2	Vukas, Šenauer, Anković
12	12 Mar	H	OFK Beograd	1 – 0	Vukas
13	19 Mar	A	Velež	0 – 2	
14	26 Mar	H	Red Star	1 – 0	Bego
15	2 Apr	H	Sarajevo	1 – 0	Vidošević
16	9 Apr	A	Vardar	0 – 1	
17	16 Apr	H	Vojvodina	2 – 0	Kozlina, Papec
18	23 Apr	A	Partizan	0 – 4	
19	30 Apr	H	Radnički Beograd	3 – 0	Anković (2), Garov
20	14 May	A	RNK Split	2 – 0	Anković (2)
21	21 May	H	Dinamo Zagreb	4 – 1	Anković (2), Kovačić, Bego
22	11 Jun	A	Rijeka	2 – 1	Bego, Anković

Sources: hajduk.hr

=== Yugoslav Cup ===
Round	Date	Venue	Opponent	Score	Hajduk Scorers
R1	11 Dec	A	Mačva	3 – 0	Bego, Papec, Šenauer
R2	18 Dec	H	Dinamo Zagreb	1 – 0	Papec
QF	26 Feb	H	Šibenik	4 – 3	Anković (3), Bego
SF	5 Mar	A	Varteks	0 – 2	

Sources: hajduk.hr

=== Mitropa Cup ===
Match	Date	Venue	Opponent	Score	Hajduk Scorers
1	3 Jul	A (Italy)	Bologna (Italy)	3 – 1	Papec, Šenauer
2	10 Jul	H	Bologna (Italy)	1 – 0	Ognjanović

Sources: hajduk.hr

== Player seasonal records ==
=== Top scorers ===
Rank	Name	League	Europe	Cup	Total
1	(Socialist Federal Republic of Yugoslavia) Andrija Anković	15	–	3	18
1	(Socialist Federal Republic of Yugoslavia) Zlatko Papec	7	1	2	9
3	(Socialist Federal Republic of Yugoslavia) Zvonko Bego	5	–	2	7
4	(Socialist Federal Republic of Yugoslavia) Vladimir Šenauer	1	1	1	3
5	(Socialist Federal Republic of Yugoslavia) Bernard Vukas	2	–	–	2
6	(Socialist Federal Republic of Yugoslavia) Pavle Garov	1	–	–	1
6	(Socialist Federal Republic of Yugoslavia) Marin Kovačić	1	–	–	1
6	(Socialist Federal Republic of Yugoslavia) Aleksandar Kozlina	1	–	–	1
6	(Socialist Federal Republic of Yugoslavia) Radivoje Ognjanović	–	1	–	1
6	(Socialist Federal Republic of Yugoslavia) Joško Vidošević	1	–	–	1
TOTALS		34	4	8	46

Source: Competitive matches

== See also ==
- 1960–61 Yugoslav First League
- 1960–61 Yugoslav Cup

== External sources ==
- 1960–61 Yugoslav First League at rsssf.com
- 1960–61 Yugoslav Cup at rsssf.com
- 1968–69 Mitropa Cup at rsssf.com
- 1960–61 Yugoslav First League at historical-lineups.com
