= Brondi (surname) =

Brondi is a surname. Notable people with the surname include:

- Ivan Brondi (born 1941), Brazilian former footballer
- Rita Brondi (1889 – 1941), Italian guitarist, lutenist, singer, composer, and music historian

== See also ==
- Brondi (disambiguation)
