= Football at the 1960 Summer Olympics – Men's Middle East Qualifiers =

Tournament details
- Dates: 15 November – 13 December 1959
- Teams: 3

Tournament statistics
- Matches played: 4
- Goals scored: 24 (6 per match)

The Middle East section of the 1960 Summer Olympics – Men's Football Qualifiers acted as qualifiers for the 1960 Summer Olympics football tournament, held in Italy, for national teams that are members of the Middle East.

== Entrants ==
Three national teams entered qualification.

- Iraq
- Lebanon
- Turkey

== Format ==
The three teams played a home-and-away round-robin tournament.

== Standings ==
Pos	Team	Pld	W	D	L	GF	GA	GD	Pts	Qualification	Turkey	Iraq	Lebanon
1	Turkey	4	4	0	0	10	3	+7	8	Qualification for 1960 Summer Olympics	—	7–1	–
2	Iraq	4	2	0	2	14	10	+4	4		2–3	—	8–0
3	Lebanon	4	0	0	4	0	11	−11	0	Withdrew	–	0–3	—

Source: RSSSF

== Matches ==
15 November 1959

Lebanon	0–3	Iraq
		Baba 2', 70'; Abdullah 85'

Beirut

25 November 1959

Iraq	8–0	Lebanon
Baba 5', 27'; Abdullah 17', 40', 50', 85'; Salih 58', 88'

Baghdad

6 December 1959

Turkey	7–1	Iraq
Yalçınkaya 14', 72'; Şensan 37', 61', 87'; Güneş 54'; Köken 74'		Baba 12'

Adana

13 December 1959

Iraq	2–3	Turkey
Baba 35', 52'		Güneş 20'; Atakan 60'; Yalçınkaya 65'

Baghdad

Turkey	w/o (Note: Lebanon withdrew after two matches, as the remaining two matches were awarded to their opponent Turkey.)	Lebanon

Lebanon	w/o	Turkey

== Qualified team ==
The following team from the Middle East qualified for the final tournament.

Team	Qualified as	Qualified on	Previous appearances in the Summer Olympics
Turkey	Winners	30 April 1960	5 (1924, 1928, 1936, 1948, 1952)
