= 1962–63 Yugoslav Cup =

1962–63 Yugoslav Football Cup
16th Marshal Tito Cup
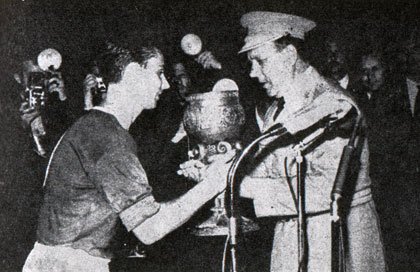
- Ratko Sofijanić presents the 1962-1963 Yugoslavian Cup to Željko Matuš, captain of Dinamo Zagreb.

Tournament details
- Country: Yugoslavia
- Dates: 16 December 1962 – 27 May 1963
- Teams: 2,383 (preliminaries); 32 (first round)

Final positions
- Champions: Dinamo Zagreb (3rd title)
- Runners-up: Hajduk Split
- Cup Winners' Cup: Dinamo Zagreb

Tournament statistics
- Matches played: 31

The 1962–63 Yugoslav Cup was the 16th season of the top football knockout competition in SFR Yugoslavia, the Yugoslav Cup (Serbo-Croatian: Kup Jugoslavije), also known as the "Marshal Tito Cup" (Kup Maršala Tita), since its establishment in 1946.

== Calendar ==
The Yugoslav Cup was a tournament for which clubs from all tiers of the football pyramid were eligible to enter. In addition, amateur teams put together by individual Yugoslav People's Army garrisons and various factories and industrial plants were also encouraged to enter, which meant that each cup edition could have several thousands of teams in its preliminary stages. In the 1962–63 season 2,383 teams were entered, who played through a series of qualifying rounds in an attempt to reach the first round proper, in which they would be paired with top-flight teams.

The cup final was played on 26 May 1963, traditionally scheduled to coincide with Youth Day celebrated on 25 May, a national holiday in Yugoslavia which also doubled as the official commemoration of Josip Broz Tito's birthday.

Round	Legs	Date played	Fixtures	Clubs
First round (round of 32)	Single	16 December 1962	16	32 → 16
Second round (round of 16)	Single	17 February 1963	8	16 → 8
Quarter-finals	Single	24 February 1963	4	8 → 4
Semi-finals	Single	2 May 1963	2	4 → 2
Final	Single	26 May 1963	1	2 → 1

== First round ==
In the following tables winning teams are marked in bold; teams from outside top level are marked in italic script.

Tie no	Home team	Score	Away team
1	**Hajduk Split**	3–1	Partizan
2	Jedinstvo Bijelo Polje	0–1	**Sutjeska Nikšić**
3	Karlovac	0–1	**OFK Belgrade**
4	**Maribor**	3–0	Rijeka
5	Mladenovac	2–5	**Čelik Zenica**
6	**Novi Sad**	1–0	Trešnjevka
7	Olimpija Ljubljana	2–4	**Budućnost Titograd**
8	Pobeda Prilep	2–8	**Red Star**
9	Proleter Zrenjanin	2–3	**Borac Banja Luka**
10	Radnički Belgrade	0–1	**Vojvodina**
11	Rudar Kakanj	0–4	**Dinamo Zagreb**
12	Sarajevo	2–4	**Vardar**
13	**Slavonija Osijek**	1–0	Velež
14	**Šibenik**	3–1 (a.e.t.)	Radnički Niš
15	**Sloboda Tuzla**	2–1 (a.e.t.)	Rudar K. Mitrovica
16	Željezničar Sarajevo	2–5 (a.e.t.)	**Srem**

== Second round ==
Tie no	Home team	Score	Away team
1	Borac Banja Luka	1–2	**Čelik Zenica**
2	**Dinamo Zagreb**	3–0 (a.e.t.)	Sloboda Tuzla
3	**Hajduk Split**	2–0 (a.e.t.)	Maribor
4	OFK Belgrade	0–1	**Vojvodina**
5	**Red Star**	4–2	Šibenik
6	**Srem**	4–0	Novi Sad
7	**Sutjeska Nikšić**	4–2	Slavonija Osijek
8	**Vardar**	2–1	Budućnost Titograd

== Quarter-finals ==
Tie no	Home team	Score	Away team
1	Čelik Zenica	0–1	**Sutjeska Nikšić**
2	**Dinamo Zagreb**	2–1	Vardar
3	Srem	1–4	**Hajduk Split**
4	**Vojvodina**	0–0 (4–1 p)	Red Star

== Semi-finals ==
Tie no	Home team	Score	Away team
1	Sutjeska Nikšić	0–0 (2–4 p)	**Dinamo Zagreb**
2	Vojvodina	2–2 (3–5 p)	**Hajduk Split**

== Final ==
26 May 1963

Dinamo Zagreb	4–1	Hajduk Split
Zambata 65', 79', 81'; Braun 68'		Anković 35'

Stadion JNA, Belgrade
Attendance: 30,000
Referee: Konstantin Zečević (Belgrade)

DINAMO ZAGREB:
GK	1	(Socialist Federal Republic of Yugoslavia) Zlatko Škorić
DF	2	(Socialist Federal Republic of Yugoslavia) Rudolf Belin
DF	3	(Socialist Federal Republic of Yugoslavia) Mirko Braun
DF	4	(Socialist Federal Republic of Yugoslavia) Zlatko Bišćan
DF	5	(Socialist Federal Republic of Yugoslavia) Vlatko Marković
MF	6	(Socialist Federal Republic of Yugoslavia) Željko Perušić
MF	7	(Socialist Federal Republic of Yugoslavia) Zdenko Kobeščak
FW	8	(Socialist Federal Republic of Yugoslavia) Slaven Zambata
FW	9	(Socialist Federal Republic of Yugoslavia) Željko Matuš
FW	10	(Socialist Federal Republic of Yugoslavia) Tomislav Knez
MF	11	(Socialist Federal Republic of Yugoslavia) Stjepan Lamza
Manager:
(Socialist Federal Republic of Yugoslavia) Milan Antolković

HAJDUK SPLIT:
GK	1	(Socialist Federal Republic of Yugoslavia) Ante Jurić
DF	2	(Socialist Federal Republic of Yugoslavia) Vinko Cuzzi
DF	3	(Socialist Federal Republic of Yugoslavia) Pave Garov
DF	4	(Socialist Federal Republic of Yugoslavia) Marin Kovačić
DF	5	(Socialist Federal Republic of Yugoslavia) Stjepan Ilić
MF	6	(Socialist Federal Republic of Yugoslavia) Miroslav Brkljača
MF	7	(Socialist Federal Republic of Yugoslavia) Ivan Hlevnjak
MF	8	(Socialist Federal Republic of Yugoslavia) Andrija Anković
FW	9	(Socialist Federal Republic of Yugoslavia) Zlatko Papec
MF	10	(Socialist Federal Republic of Yugoslavia) Zvonko Bego
FW	11	(Socialist Federal Republic of Yugoslavia) Veljko Zuber
Manager:
(Socialist Federal Republic of Yugoslavia) Florijan Matekalo

== See also ==
- 1962–63 Yugoslav First League
- 1962–63 Yugoslav Second League
