= List of FK Sutjeska Nikšić seasons =

This is a list of the seasons played by FK Sutjeska from 1946, when the club first entered a top-tier national competition to the most recent seasons. The club's achievements in all major national competitions are listed.
Because the fact that FK Sutjeska in period 1925-1941 participated in lower, not-national competitions, that period is not listed. In that time (before World War II) Sutjeska played once in the final of Montenegrin Football Championship (1922-1940).

== Overall (1946-) ==
Most of their seasons in domestic competition, FK Sutjeska spent in First League (Yugoslav First League, First League of Serbia and Montenegro and Montenegrin First League). Also, the club played seasons in the Second League of SFR Yugoslavia and Serbia and Montenegro, and few seasons in Montenegrin Republic League.

| Competition Level | Seasons | First season | Last season | Matches | W | D | L | GD |
|---|---|---|---|---|---|---|---|---|
| First League | 34 | 1964–65 | 2019-20 | 1137 | 526 | 260 | 451 | 1371:1461 |
| Second League | 30 | 1955-56 | 2005-06 | 880 | 425 | 158 | 217 | 1462:1071 |
| Third League | 1 | 1949-50 | 1949-50 | 22 | 3 | 5 | 14 | 16:42 |
| Republic League | 10 | 1946 | 1976-77 | 126 | 85 | 15 | 26 | 334:131 |
| Playoffs | 10 | 1946-47 | 2010-11 | 32 | 13 | 7 | 12 | 37:48 |
| National Cup | 49 | 1947-48 | 2019-20 | 119 | 48 | 22 | 49 | 157:141 |
| UEFA competitions | 8 | 2003-04 | 2019-20 | 24 | 2 | 8 | 14 | 15:37 |
| Balkans Cup | 1 | 1972-73 | 1972-73 | 4 | 2 | 0 | 2 | 2:4 |
| OVERALL (1946-) | | | | 2344 | 1104 | 475 | 785 | 3394:2935 |

== Seasons in domestic competitions ==
=== Championship ===
==== Final placement by seasons ====
From 1946, FK Sutjeska played 77 seasons in domestic leagues of SFR Yugoslavia, FR Yugoslavia, Serbia and Montenegro and Montenegro. Below is a list of FK Sutjeska final placements by every single season.

| Season | League | Pos | M | W | D | L | GD | Pts |
|---|---|---|---|---|---|---|---|---|
| 1946 | Montenegrin Republic League | 3 | 6 | 1 | 0 | 5 | 11:24 | 2 |
| 1946/47 | Montenegrin Republic League | 1 | 8 | 6 | 1 | 1 | 19:9 | 13 |
| 1947/48 | Montenegrin Republic League | 4 | 7 | 2 | 2 | 3 | 8:9 | 6 |
| 1948/49 | Montenegrin Republic League | 1 | 7 | 6 | 1 | 0 | 20:2 | 13 |
| 1949/50 | Yugoslav Third League | 10 | 22 | 3 | 5 | 14 | 16:42 | 11 |
| 1950/51 | Montenegrin Republic League | 2 | 18 | 12 | 2 | 4 | 52:18 | 26 |
| 1951/52 | Montenegrin Republic League | 2 | 8 | 4 | 0 | 4 | 18:13 | 8 |
| 1952/53 | Montenegrin Republic League | 4 | 14 | 7 | 3 | 4 | 32:17 | 17 |
| 1953/54 | Montenegrin Republic League | 2 | 14 | 11 | 2 | 1 | 36:6 | 24 |
| 1954/55 | Montenegrin Republic League | 1 | 14 | 12 | 2 | 0 | 48:18 | 26 |
| 1955/56 | Yugoslav Second League | 10 | 9 | 4 | 1 | 4 | 13:13 | 9 |
| 1956/57 | Yugoslav Second League | 2 | 18 | 9 | 4 | 5 | 40:25 | 22 |
| 1957/58 | Yugoslav Second League | 1 | 18 | 12 | 3 | 3 | 50:19 | 27 |
| 1958/59 | Yugoslav Second League | 10 | 22 | 8 | 1 | 13 | 40:59 | 17 |
| 1959/60 | Yugoslav Second League | 3 | 22 | 12 | 2 | 8 | 32:46 | 26 |
| 1960/61 | Yugoslav Second League | 7 | 22 | 7 | 5 | 10 | 28:35 | 19 |
| 1961/62 | Yugoslav Second League | 7 | 22 | 10 | 1 | 11 | 36:33 | 21 |
| 1962/63 | Yugoslav Second League | 4 | 30 | 13 | 8 | 9 | 63:45 | 34 |
| 1963/64 | Yugoslav Second League | 1 | 30 | 19 | 4 | 7 | 62:38 | 42 |
| 1964/65 | Yugoslav First League | 15 | 28 | 6 | 7 | 15 | 31:57 | 19 |
| 1965/66 | Yugoslav Second League | 1 | 34 | 16 | 10 | 8 | 70:45 | 42 |
| 1966/67 | Yugoslav First League | 15 | 30 | 8 | 6 | 16 | 30:58 | 22 |
| 1967/68 | Yugoslav Second League | 16 | 34 | 12 | 6 | 16 | 63:77 | 30 |
| 1968/69 | Yugoslav Second League | 2 | 30 | 19 | 6 | 5 | 67:23 | 44 |
| 1969/70 | Yugoslav Second League | 1 | 30 | 22 | 4 | 4 | 67:13 | 48 |
| 1970/71 | Yugoslav Second League | 1 | 30 | 18 | 8 | 4 | 67:22 | 44 |
| 1971/72 | Yugoslav First League | 16 | 34 | 9 | 10 | 15 | 25:40 | 28 |
| 1972/73 | Yugoslav First League | 18 | 34 | 9 | 7 | 18 | 32:49 | 25 |
| 1973/74 | Yugoslav Second League | 11 | 34 | 13 | 6 | 15 | 45:47 | 32 |
| 1974/75 | Yugoslav Second League | 2 | 34 | 19 | 1 | 14 | 66:47 | 39 |
| 1975/76 | Yugoslav Second League | 14 | 34 | 11 | 8 | 15 | 43:51 | 30 |
| 1976/77 | Montenegrin Republic League | 1 | 30 | 24 | 2 | 4 | 90:15 | 50 |
| 1977/78 | Yugoslav Second League | 6 | 34 | 15 | 5 | 14 | 45:43 | 35 |
| 1978/79 | Yugoslav Second League | 5 | 30 | 10 | 12 | 8 | 36:26 | 32 |
| 1979/80 | Yugoslav Second League | 10 | 30 | 12 | 3 | 15 | 41:44 | 27 |
| 1980/81 | Yugoslav Second League | 4 | 30 | 11 | 11 | 8 | 27:24 | 33 |
| 1981/82 | Yugoslav Second League | 5 | 30 | 12 | 8 | 10 | 30:36 | 32 |
| 1982/83 | Yugoslav Second League | 2 | 34 | 19 | 8 | 7 | 59:31 | 46 |
| 1983/84 | Yugoslav Second League | 1 | 34 | 23 | 7 | 4 | 62:22 | 53 |
| 1984/85 | Yugoslav First League | 9 | 34 | 11 | 11 | 12 | 41:42 | 33 |
| 1985/86 | Yugoslav First League | 10 | 34 | 14 | 4 | 16 | 55:61 | 32 |
| 1986/87 | Yugoslav First League | 10 | 34 | 12 | 10 | 12 | 50:52 | 34 |
| 1987/88 | Yugoslav First League | 17 | 34 | 10 | 9 | 15 | 42:49 | 29 |
| 1988/89 | Yugoslav Second League | 8 | 38 | 15 | 3 | 20 | 47:48 | 33 |
| 1989/90 | Yugoslav Second League | 3 | 38 | 21 | 1 | 16 | 70:34 | 43 |
| 1990/91 | Yugoslav Second League | 4 | 36 | 17 | 4 | 15 | 43:29 | 38 |
| 1991/92 | Yugoslav First League | 13 | 33 | 11 | 1 | 21 | 40:47 | 23 |
| 1992/93 | FR Yugoslavia First League | 16 | 36 | 11 | 7 | 18 | 46:67 | 29 |
| 1993/94 | FR Yugoslavia First League | 18 | 36 | 7 | 15 | 14 | 38:63 | 29 |
| 1994/95 | FR Yugoslavia First League | 19 | 36 | 8 | 4 | 24 | 33:70 | 20 |
| 1995/96 | FR Yugoslavia Second League | 11 | 36 | 18 | 3 | 15 | 65:47 | 57 |
| 1996/97 | FR Yugoslavia First League | 20 | 33 | 12 | 4 | 17 | 43:56 | 40 |
| 1997/98 | FR Yugoslavia First League | 21 | 33 | 8 | 8 | 17 | 34:43 | 32 |
| 1998/99 | FR Yugoslavia Second League | 2 | 21 | 13 | 4 | 4 | 45:21 | 43 |
| 1999/00 | FR Yugoslavia First League | 5 | 40 | 17 | 9 | 14 | 50:50 | 60 |
| 2000/01 | FR Yugoslavia First League | 7 | 34 | 14 | 4 | 16 | 52:64 | 46 |
| 2001/02 | FR Yugoslavia First League | 11 | 34 | 14 | 4 | 16 | 32:45 | 46 |
| 2002/03 | SCG First League | 4 | 34 | 19 | 5 | 10 | 43:32 | 62 |
| 2003/04 | SCG First League | 8 | 30 | 12 | 4 | 14 | 38:36 | 40 |
| 2004/05 | SCG First League | 15 | 30 | 5 | 7 | 18 | 21:48 | 22 |
| 2005/06 | SCG Second League | 2 | 36 | 15 | 11 | 10 | 40:28 | 56 |
| 2006/07 | Montenegrin First League | 8 | 33 | 10 | 8 | 15 | 24:33 | 38 |
| 2007/08 | Montenegrin First League | 11 | 33 | 5 | 11 | 17 | 19:44 | 26 |
| 2008/09 | Montenegrin First League | 3 | 33 | 18 | 9 | 6 | 45:23 | 63 |
| 2009/10 | Montenegrin First League | 7 | 33 | 11 | 7 | 15 | 33:36 | 40 |
| 2010/11 | Montenegrin First League | 11 | 33 | 9 | 7 | 17 | 32:54 | 34 |
| 2011/12 | Montenegrin First League | 8 | 33 | 9 | 9 | 15 | 29:36 | 36 |
| 2012/13 | Montenegrin First League | 1 | 33 | 20 | 5 | 8 | 50:31 | 65 |
| 2013/14 | Montenegrin First League | 1 | 33 | 17 | 12 | 4 | 46:21 | 63 |
| 2014/15 | Montenegrin First League | 2 | 33 | 20 | 9 | 4 | 58:23 | 69 |
| 2015/16 | Montenegrin First League | 5 | 33 | 15 | 9 | 9 | 46:31 | 54 |
| 2016/17 | Montenegrin First League | 4 | 33 | 15 | 10 | 8 | 43:25 | 55 |
| 2017/18 | Montenegrin First League | 1 | 36 | 24 | 7 | 5 | 55:23 | 79 |
| 2018/19 | Montenegrin First League | 1 | 36 | 21 | 11 | 4 | 58:21 | 74 |
| 2019/20 | Montenegrin First League | 2 | 31 | 15 | 10 | 6 | 57:31 | 55 |
| 2020/21 | Montenegrin First League | 2 | 36 | 15 | 12 | 9 | 56:34 | 57 |
| 2021/22 | Montenegrin First League | 1 | 36 | 22 | 9 | 5 | 64:29 | 75 |
| 2022/23 | Montenegrin First League | 2 | 36 | 20 | 10 | 6 | 75:34 | 70 |
| 2023/24 | Montenegrin First League | 4 | 36 | 13 | 14 | 9 | 46:36 | 53 |
| 2024/25 | Montenegrin First League | 3 | 36 | 14 | 9 | 13 | 40:38 | 51 |

==== Playoffs ====
At the end of ten seasons, FK Sutjeska played in the playoffs for placement in the First and Second League.

| Year | Playoff | Round | Opponent | Home | Away |
|---|---|---|---|---|---|
| 1946/47 | First League playoffs | Semifinals | Bokelj Kotor | 3:1 | 2:1 |
| 1946/47 | First League playoffs | Final | Sarajevo | 2:2 | 1:6 |
| 1946/47 | Second League playoffs | Semifinals | Velež Mostar | 3:1 | 1:0 |
| 1946/47 | Second League playoffs | Final | Rabotnički Skopje | 3:1 | 0:3 |
| 1948/49 | Second League playoffs | Group | Kumanovo | 0:3 | 3:0 |
| 1948/49 | Second League playoffs | Group | Ljubljana | 1:1 | 0:3 |
| 1948/49 | Second League playoffs | Group | Željezničar Sarajevo | 0:3 | 0:3 |
| 1949/50 | Second League playoffs | Final | Bokelj Kotor | 2:0 | 0:3 |
| 1957/58 | First League playoffs | Round one | Sarajevo | 0:0 | 0:4 |
| 1968/69 | First League playoffs | Semifinals | Radnički Kragujevac | 2:2 | 1:2 |
| 1969/70 | First League playoffs | Semifinals | Borac Čačak | 1:0 | 0:2 |
| 1970/71 | First League playoffs | Semifinals | Borac Čačak | 3:1 | 0:1 |
| 1970/71 | First League playoffs | Final | Proleter Zrenjanin | 2:0 | 1:1 |
| 1993/94 | First League playoffs | Final | Novi Pazar | 2:1 | 2:3 |
| 2007/08 | First League playoffs | Final | Čelik Nikšić | 1:0 | 0:0 |
| 2010/11 | First League playoffs | Final | Jedinstvo Bijelo Polje | 1:0 | 0:0 |

==== First League attendance ====
Below is the list of attendance at FK Sutjeska First League home games by every single season.

| Season | League | Average | Total | Games | Highest | Lowest |
|---|---|---|---|---|---|---|
| 1964/65 | Yugoslav First League | 6,500 | 91,000 | 14 | 8,000 (vs. Hajduk, Crvena zvezda) | 5,000 (vs. Rijeka) |
| 1966/67 | Yugoslav First League | 7,967 | 119,500 | 15 | 15,000 (vs. Partizan) | 5,000 (vs. Olimpija) |
| 1971/72 | Yugoslav First League | 9,206 | 156,500 | 17 | 19,000 (vs. Crvena zvezda) | 2,500 (vs. Sloboda) |
| 1972/73 | Yugoslav First League | 6,059 | 103,000 | 17 | 12,000 (vs. Crvena zvezda) | 3,000 (vs. Sarajevo, OFK Beograd) |
| 1984/85 | Yugoslav First League | 5,765 | 98,000 | 17 | 15,000 (vs. Hajduk) | 2,000 (vs. Iskra) |
| 1985/86 | Yugoslav First League | 4,177 | 71,000 | 17 | 7,000 (vs. Budućnost, Crvena zvezda) | 2,000 (vs. Sloboda) |
| 1986/87 | Yugoslav First League | 4,030 | 68,500 | 17 | 8,000 (vs. Budućnost) | 1,500 (vs. Cibalia) |
| 1987/88 | Yugoslav First League | 4,353 | 74,000 | 17 | 11,000 (vs. Crvena zvezda) | 1,500 (vs. Velež) |
| 1991/92 | Yugoslav First League | 2,553 | 43,400 | 17 | 7,000 (vs. Partizan) | 500 (vs. Spartak, Sloboda) |
| 1992/93 | FR Yugoslavia First League | 1,311 | 23,600 | 18 | 5,000 (vs. Partizan) | 200 (vs. Hajduk Kula) |
| 1993/94 | FR Yugoslavia First League | 1,066 | 19,200 | 18 | 2,500 (vs. Rudar) | 300 (vs. Jastrebac) |
| 1994/95 | FR Yugoslavia First League | 750 | 13,500 | 18 | 2,000 (vs. Budućnost, Proleter) | 200 (vs. Radnički Beograd) |
| 1996/97 | FR Yugoslavia First League | 888 | 14,200 | 16 | 2,500 (vs. Rudar, Obilić) | 500 (vs. Mladost Bački Jarak) |
| 1997/98 | FR Yugoslavia First League | 669 | 10,700 | 16 | 1,500 (vs. Spartak, Rudar) | 300 (vs. Radnički Niš) |
| 1999/00 | FR Yugoslavia First League | 2,395 | 47,900 | 20 | 7,000 (vs. Crvena zvezda) | 600 (vs. Proleter) |
| 2000/01 | FR Yugoslavia First League | 2,129 | 36,200 | 17 | 8,000 (vs. Crvena zvezda) | 500 (vs. OFK Beograd) |
| 2001/02 | FR Yugoslavia First League | 1,582 | 26,900 | 17 | 5,000 (vs. Partizan) | 500 (vs. Zvezdara) |
| 2002/03 | SCG First League | 2,382 | 40,500 | 17 | 6,000 (vs. Partizan) | 800 (vs. Javor) |
| 2003/04 | SCG First League | 1,620 | 24,300 | 15 | 7,000 (vs. Partizan) | 300 (vs. Radnički Obrenovac) |
| 2004/05 | SCG First League | 1,527 | 22,900 | 15 | 6,000 (vs. Partizan) | 300 (vs. Čukarički, Borac) |
| 2006/07 | Montenegrin First League | 1,300 | 20,800 | 16 | 3,000 (vs. Budućnost) | 500 (vs. Berane) |
| 2007/08 | Montenegrin First League | 1,225 | 14,700 | 12 | 4,000 (vs. Budućnost) | 300 (vs. Mladost) |
| 2008/09 | Montenegrin First League | 1,506 | 25,600 | 17 | 5,000 (vs. Budućnost) | 700 (vs. Dečić) |
| 2009/10 | Montenegrin First League | 1,513 | 24,200 | 16 | 5,000 (vs. Budućnost) | 500 (vs. Mogren) |
| 2010/11 | Montenegrin First League | 1,260 | 18,900 | 15 | 3,500 (vs. Budućnost) | 500 (vs. Mornar) |
| 2011/12 | Montenegrin First League | 1,260 | 24,000 | 15 | 4,000 (vs. Budućnost) | 300 (vs. Mladost) |
| 2012/13 | Montenegrin First League | 2,529 | 43,000 | 17 | 7,000 (vs. Čelik, Budućnost) | 1,000 (vs. Jedinstvo) |
| 2013/14 | Montenegrin First League | 2,230 | 37,900 | 17 | 6,000 (vs. Lovćen) | 700 (vs. Mladost) |
| 2014/15 | Montenegrin First League | 1,267 | 19,000 | 15 | 3,500 (vs. Budućnost) | 500 (vs. Petrovac) |
| 2015/16 | Montenegrin First League | 1,035 | 17,600 | 17 | 2,000 (vs. Budućnost) | 300 (vs. Lovćen) |
| 2016/17 | Montenegrin First League | 1,500 | 25,500 | 17 | 3,500 (vs. Lovćen) | 700 (vs. Jedinstvo) |
| 2017/18 | Montenegrin First League | 1,128 | 20,300 | 18 | 3,000 (vs. Budućnost) | 700 (vs. Dečić) |
| 2018/19 | Montenegrin First League | 1,061 | 19,100 | 18 | 3,500 (vs. Budućnost) | 400 (vs. Mornar) |
| 2019/20 | Montenegrin First League | 964 | 10,600 | 11 | 3,000 (vs. Budućnost) | 300 (vs. Kom) |
| 2020/21 | Season played without attendance due to the coronavirus pandemic | | | | | |

=== National Cup ===
FK Sutjeska participated in 54 seasons of national Cup competition, since 1948. During their history, Sutjeska played in Yugoslav Cup, FR Yugoslavia Cup and, since the 2006-07 season, in Montenegrin Cup.
Sutjeska played twice in the final of national cup (2006/07, 2016/17), with one title on season 2016/17.

| Season | Competition | Round | Match | Result |
|---|---|---|---|---|
| 1948 | Yugoslav Cup | Round one | Velež Mostar - Sutjeska | 2:1 |
| 1950 | Yugoslav Cup | Round one | Sutjeska - Budućnost Podgorica | 0:2 |
| 1953 | Yugoslav Cup | Round of 16 | OFK Beograd - Sutjeska | 5:1 |
| 1958-59 | Yugoslav Cup | Round one | Budućnost Podgorica - Sutjeska | 3:2 |
| 1959-60 | Yugoslav Cup | Round one | Sutjeska - Vardar Skopje | 2:0 |
| 1959-60 | Yugoslav Cup | Round of 16 | Elektrostroj Zagreb - Sutjeska | 4:1 |
| 1960-61 | Yugoslav Cup | Round one | Šibenik - Sutjeska | 3:1 |
| 1961-62 | Yugoslav Cup | Round one | Sutjeska - Rijeka | 0:2 |
| 1962-63 | Yugoslav Cup | Round one | Jedinstvo Bijelo Polje - Sutjeska | 0:1 |
| 1962-63 | Yugoslav Cup | Round of 16 | Sutjeska - Osijek | 4:2 |
| 1962-63 | Yugoslav Cup | Quarterfinals | Čelik Zenica - Sutjeska | 0:1 |
| 1962-63 | Yugoslav Cup | Semifinals | Sutjeska - Dinamo Zagreb | 0:0* |
| 1964-65 | Yugoslav Cup | Round one | Sutjeska - Budućnost Podgorica | 2:3 |
| 1965-66 | Yugoslav Cup | Round one | Sutjeska - OFK Beograd | 3:3* |
| 1969-70 | Yugoslav Cup | Round of 16 | Radnički Niš - Sutjeska | 1:0 |
| 1971-72 | Yugoslav Cup | Round of 16 | Sutjeska - Vardar Skopje | 1:2 |
| 1973 | Yugoslav Cup | Round one | Zagreb - Sutjeska | 3:0 |
| 1977-78 | Yugoslav Cup | Round one | Sutjeska - Sloboda Tuzla | 0:0* |
| 1978-79 | Yugoslav Cup | Round one | Belišće - Sutjeska | 1:2 |
| 1978-79 | Yugoslav Cup | Round of 16 | Sutjeska - Crvena Zvezda Beograd | 3:3* |
| 1979–80 | Yugoslav Cup | Round one | Sutjeska - Borac Banja Luka | 1:1* |
| 1980-81 | Yugoslav Cup | Round one | Čelik Zenica - Sutjeska | 1:2 |
| 1980-81 | Yugoslav Cup | Round of 16 | Sutjeska - Velež Mostar | 0:3 |
| 1985–86 | Yugoslav Cup | Round one | 14. Oktobar Kruševac - Sutjeska | 2:1 |
| 1986-87 | Yugoslav Cup | Round one | Belišće - Sutjeska | 1:2 |
| 1986-87 | Yugoslav Cup | Round of 16 | Sutjeska - Spartak Subotica | 2:1, 0:2 |
| 1987–88 | Yugoslav Cup | Round one | Mladost Petrinja - Sutjeska | 1:0 |
| 1988–89 | Yugoslav Cup | Round one | Sutjeska - Dinamo Zagreb | 0:0* |
| 1990–91 | Yugoslav Cup | Round one | Partizan Beograd - Sutjeska | 2:0 |
| 1991-92 | Yugoslav Cup | Round one | Sutjeska - Sarajevo | 1:0 |
| 1991-92 | Yugoslav Cup | Round of 16 | Sutjeska - Velež Mostar | 1:4, 1:6 |
| 1992-93 | FR Yugoslavia Cup | Round one | Jastrebac Niš - Sutjeska | 0:1 |
| 1992-93 | FR Yugoslavia Cup | Round of 16 | Sutjeska - Mačva Šabac | 5:0, 0:2 |
| 1992-93 | FR Yugoslavia Cup | Quarterfinals | Sutjeska - Crvena Zvezda Beograd | 2:1, 0:2 |
| 1993-94 | FR Yugoslavia Cup | Round one | Bačka Palanka - Sutjeska | 2:1 |
| 1994-95 | FR Yugoslavia Cup | Round one | Partizan Beograd - Sutjeska | 3:0 |
| 1995-96 | FR Yugoslavia Cup | Round one | Sutjeska - Bečej | 1:0 |
| 1995-96 | FR Yugoslavia Cup | Round of 16 | Sutjeska - Novi Sad | 1:1, 0:1 |
| 1997-98 | FR Yugoslavia Cup | Round one | Borac Čačak - Sutjeska | 0:1 |
| 1997-98 | FR Yugoslavia Cup | Round of 16 | Sutjeska - Vojvodina Novi Sad | 1:1, 0:5 |
| 1998-99 | FR Yugoslavia Cup | Round one | Sutjeska - Čukarički Beograd | 1:1* |
| 2000-01 | FR Yugoslavia Cup | Round one | Mladost Apatin - Sutjeska | 3:0 |
| 2001-02 | FR Yugoslavia Cup | Round one | Radnički Obrenovac - Sutjeska | 1:0 |
| 2002-03 | SCG Cup | Round one | Radnički Pirot - Sutjeska | 3:2 |
| 2004-05 | SCG Cup | Round one | Sutjeska - Čukarički Beograd | 0:1 |
| 2005-06 | SCG Cup | Round one | Sutjeska - Mačva Šabac | 1:0 |
| 2005-06 | SCG Cup | Round of 16 | Hajduk Kula - Sutjeska | 2:0 |
| 2006-07 | Montenegrin Cup | Round one | Arsenal Tivat - Sutjeska | 0:2 |
| 2006-07 | Montenegrin Cup | Round of 16 | Sutjeska - Bokelj Kotor | 0:1, 1:0* |
| 2006-07 | Montenegrin Cup | Quarterfinals | Sutjeska - Dečić Tuzi | 0:0, 1:1 |
| 2006-07 | Montenegrin Cup | Semifinals | Zeta Golubovci - Sutjeska | 3:2, 0:1 |
| 2006-07 | Montenegrin Cup | FINAL | Sutjeska - Rudar Pljevlja | 1:2 |
| 2007-08 | Montenegrin Cup | Round of 16 | Mogren Budva - Sutjeska | 1:1, 1:0 |
| 2008-09 | Montenegrin Cup | Round one | Blue Star Podgorica - Sutjeska | 0:0* |
| 2008-09 | Montenegrin Cup | Round of 16 | Cetinje - Sutjeska | 0:0, 0:2 |
| 2008-09 | Montenegrin Cup | Quarterfinals | Sutjeska - Lovćen Cetinje | 1:0, 0:1* |
| 2009-10 | Montenegrin Cup | Round one | Iskra Danilovgrad - Sutjeska | 2:3 |
| 2009-10 | Montenegrin Cup | Round of 16 | Dečić Tuzi - Sutjeska | 0:1, 0:2 |
| 2009-10 | Montenegrin Cup | Quarterfinals | Budućnost Podgorica - Sutjeska | 1:1, 1:0 |
| 2010-11 | Montenegrin Cup | Round one | Sutjeska - Otrant Ulcinj | 7:0 |
| 2010-11 | Montenegrin Cup | Round of 16 | Iskra Danilovgrad - Sutjeska | 1:2, 0:2 |
| 2010-11 | Montenegrin Cup | Quarterfinals | Rudar Pljevlja - Sutjeska | 0:0, 2:1 |
| 2011-12 | Montenegrin Cup | Round one | Zabjelo Podgorica - Sutjeska | 0:2 |
| 2011-12 | Montenegrin Cup | Round of 16 | Sutjeska - Zeta Golubovci | 2:0, 0:3 |
| 2012-13 | Montenegrin Cup | Round one | Tekstilac Bijelo Polje - Sutjeska | 0:6 |
| 2012-13 | Montenegrin Cup | Round of 16 | Zeta Golubovci - Sutjeska | 1:0, 0:0 |
| 2013-14 | Montenegrin Cup | Round one | Jezero Plav - Sutjeska | 2:1 |
| 2014-15 | Montenegrin Cup | Round one | Sutjeska - Iskra Danilovgrad | 2:0 |
| 2014-15 | Montenegrin Cup | Round of 16 | Berane - Sutjeska | 3:2, 0:2 |
| 2014-15 | Montenegrin Cup | Quarterfinals | Sutjeska - Mornar Bar | 3:0, 0:2 |
| 2014-15 | Montenegrin Cup | Semifinals | Sutjeska - Mladost Podgorica | 0:2, 0:2 |
| 2015-16 | Montenegrin Cup | Round one | Bratstvo Cijevna - Sutjeska | 0:3 |
| 2015-16 | Montenegrin Cup | Round of 16 | Rudar Pljevlja - Sutjeska | 1:0, 3:0 |
| 2016-17 | Montenegrin Cup | Round one | Sutjeska - Radnički Berane | 5:0 |
| 2016-17 | Montenegrin Cup | Round of 16 | Zeta Golubovci - Sutjeska | 0:1, 2:2 |
| 2016-17 | Montenegrin Cup | Quarterfinals | Petrovac - Sutjeska | 1:0, 0:1 - 3:4* |
| 2016-17 | Montenegrin Cup | Semifinals | Iskra Danilovgrad - Sutjeska | 0:5, 3:4 |
| 2016-17 | Montenegrin Cup | FINAL | Sutjeska - Grbalj Radanovići | 1:0 |
| 2017-18 | Montenegrin Cup | Round of 16 | Rudar Pljevlja - Sutjeska | 0:0, 0:4 |
| 2017-18 | Montenegrin Cup | Quarterfinals | Budućnost Podgorica - Sutjeska | 2:0, 1:0 |
| 2018-19 | Montenegrin Cup | Round one | Crvena Stijena Podgorica - Sutjeska | 0:7 |
| 2018-19 | Montenegrin Cup | Round of 16 | Sutjeska - Iskra Danilovgrad | 3:0, 4:1 |
| 2018-19 | Montenegrin Cup | Quarterfinals | Sutjeska - Igalo | 2:0, 2:1 |
| 2018-19 | Montenegrin Cup | Semifinals | Budućnost Podgorica - Sutjeska | 0:0, 1:1 |
| 2019-20 | Montenegrin Cup | Round of 16 | Sutjeska - Lovćen Cetinje | 4:0, 3:0 |
| 2019-20 | Montenegrin Cup | Quarterfinals | Zeta Golubovci - Sutjeska | 0:0, 0:1 |
| 2019-20 | Montenegrin Cup | Competition was interrupted due to COVID-19 | | |
| 2020-21 | Montenegrin Cup | Round of 16 | Sutjeska - Jedinstvo Bijelo Polje | 3:0 |
| 2020-21 | Montenegrin Cup | Quarterfinals | Dečić Tuzi - Sutjeska | 1:0 |
| 2021-22 | Montenegrin Cup | Round of 16 | Bokelj Kotor - Sutjeska | 1:2 |
| 2021-22 | Montenegrin Cup | Quarterfinals | Sutjeska - Podgorica | 4:0 |
| 2021-22 | Montenegrin Cup | Semifinals | Sutjeska - Budućnost | 0:3, 1:2 |
| 2022-23 | Montenegrin Cup | Round of 16 | Sutjeska - Jezero | 1:0 |
| 2022-23 | Montenegrin Cup | Quarter-finals | Rudar - Sutjeska | 0:2 |
| 2022-23 | Montenegrin Cup | Semi-finals | Sutjeska - Dečić | 3:1, 1:1 |
| 2022-23 | Montenegrin Cup | FINAL | Sutjeska - Arsenal | 1:1* |
| 2023-24 | Montenegrin Cup | Round of 16 | Dečić - Sutjeska | 1:0 |
| 2024-25 | Montenegrin Cup | Round of 16 | Rudar - Sutjeska | 1:0 |
| 2025-26 | Montenegrin Cup | Round of 16 | Sutjeska - Lovćen | 3:1 |

* - penalties

== Seasons in European competitions ==
During the history, FK Sutjeska played in UEFA Champions League, UEFA Europa League, UEFA Europa Conference League and UEFA Intertoto Cup. Except participation in UEFA competitions, during the history Sutjeska played in the Balkans Cup.

=== UEFA competitions ===
FK Sutjeska debuted in European competitions at 2003, when they played in UEFA Intertoto Cup. After the Montenegrin independence, Sutjeska often played in UEFA competitions, with four seasons in the Champions League qualifiers.

==== Overall ====
| Competition | Seasons | First | Last | Pld | W | D | L | GF | GA | GD |
|---|---|---|---|---|---|---|---|---|---|---|
| UEFA Champions League | 6 | 2013–14 | 2026–27 | 14 | 0 | 3 | 11 | 4 | 27 | –23 |
| UEFA Europa League | 6 | 2009–10 | 2020–21 | 11 | 1 | 3 | 7 | 8 | 16 | –8 |
| UEFA Conference League | 5 | 2021–22 | 2026–27 | 16 | 4 | 4 | 8 | 14 | 23 | –9 |
| Intertoto Cup | 1 | 2003 | 2003 | 4 | 1 | 2 | 1 | 4 | 2 | +2 |
| OVERALL | 18 seasons | | | 45 | 6 | 12 | 27 | 30 | 68 | –38 |

==== Matches by season ====
| Season | Competition | Round | Club | Home | Away | Aggregate |
|---|---|---|---|---|---|---|
| 2003 | UEFA Intertoto Cup | 1R | Union Luxembourg | 3–0 | 1–1 | 4–1 |
| 2003 | UEFA Intertoto Cup | 2R | (Finland) Tampere United | 0–1 | 0–0 | 0–1 |
| 2009–10 | UEFA Europa League | 1QR | (Belarus) Partizan Minsk | 1–1 | 1–2 | 2–3 |
| 2013–14 | UEFA Champions League | 2QR | (Moldova) Sheriff Tiraspol | 0–5 | 1–1 | 1–6 |
| 2014–15 | UEFA Champions League | 2QR | (Moldova) Sheriff Tiraspol | 0–3 | 0–2 | 0–5 |
| 2015–16 | UEFA Europa League | 1QR | (Hungary) Debrecen | 2–0 | 0–3 | 2–3 |
| 2017–18 | UEFA Europa League | 1QR | (Bulgaria) Levski Sofia | 0–0 | 1–3 | 1–3 |
| 2018–19 | UEFA Champions League | 1QR | (Kazakhstan) Astana | 0–2 | 0–1 | 0–3 |
| 2018–19 | UEFA Europa League | 2QR | (Armenia) Alashkert | 0–1 | 0–0 | 0–1 |
| 2019–20 | UEFA Champions League | 1QR | (Slovakia) Slovan Bratislava | 1–1 (a.e.t.) | 1–1 | 2–2 (3–2 p.) |
| 2019–20 | UEFA Champions League | 2QR | (Cyprus) APOEL | 0–1 | 0–3 | 0–4 |
| 2019–20 | UEFA Europa League | 3QR | (Northern Ireland) Linfield | 1–2 | 2–3 | 3–5 |
| 2020–21 | UEFA Europa League | 1QR | (Bosnia and Herzegovina) Borac Banja Luka | 0–1 | | |
| 2021–22 | UEFA Europa Conference League | 1QR | (Georgia (country)) Gagra | 1–0 | 1–1 | 2–1 |
| 2021–22 | UEFA Europa Conference League | 2QR | (Israel) Maccabi Tel Aviv | 0–0 | 1–3 | 1–3 |
| 2022–23 | UEFA Champions League | 1QR | (Bulgaria) Ludogorets Razgrad | 0–1 | 0–2 | 0–3 |
| 2022–23 | UEFA Europa Conference League | 2QR | (Faroe Islands) KÍ Klaksvík | 0–0 | 0–1 | 0–1 |
| 2023–24 | UEFA Europa Conference League | 1QR | (San Marino) Cosmos | 1–0 | 1–1 | 2–1 |
| 2023–24 | UEFA Europa Conference League | 2QR | (Andorra) FC Santa Coloma | 2–0 | 0–3 (a.e.t.) | 2–3 |
| 2025–26 | UEFA Conference League | 1QR | (Belarus) Dynamo Brest | 1–2 | 2–0 | 3–2 |
| 2025–26 | UEFA Conference League | 2QR | (Israel) Beitar Jerusalem | 1–2 | 2–5 | 3–7 |
| 2026–27 | UEFA Champions League | 1QR | (Kazakhstan) Kairat Almaty | 0–2 | 1–2 | 1–4 |
| 2026–27 | UEFA Conference League | 2QR | (Belarus) ML Vitebsk | 1–2 | 0–3 | 1–5 |

=== Other competitions ===
==== Balkans Cup ====
FK Sutjeska played one season in the Balkans Cup, a regional competition for clubs from Yugoslavia, Albania, Bulgaria, Greece, Romania and Turkey.

===== Matches =====
| Season | Competition | Round | Club | Home | Away | Aggregate |
|---|---|---|---|---|---|---|
| 1973 | Balkans Cup | Group A | (Albania) Labinoti Elbasani | 0–1 | 1–0 | 3rd |
| 1973 | Balkans Cup | Group A | (Romania) ASA Târgu Mureș | 1–0 | 0–3 | 3rd |

== See also ==
- FK Sutjeska Nikšić
- Montenegrin First League
- Montenegrin clubs in Yugoslav football competitions (1946–2006)
- Montenegrin Derby
