= Anković =

Anković is a surname. Notable people with the surname include:

- Andrija Anković (1937–1980), Croatian footballer and manager
- Tonča Anković (born 1942), Croatian novellist
