= Nenezić =

Nenezić is a surname. Notable people with the surname include:

- Brajan Nenezić (born 1953), Montenegrin footballer
- Igor Nenezić (born 1984), Slovenian footballer
- Ljubica Nenezić (born 1997), Montenegrin handball player
