= Bilge Tarhan =

Bilge Tarhan may refer to:

- Bilge Tarhan (footballer)
- Bilge Tarhan (gymnast)
