= FK Sutjeska Nikšić =

Sutjeska Nikšić
- Full name: Fudbalski klub Sutjeska (Sutjeska Football Club)
- Nicknames: Plavo-bijeli (The Blue-Whites), Plavi (The Blues)
- Founded: 1920; 106 years ago
- Ground: Nikšić City Stadium
- Capacity: 5,214
- Owner: Municipality of Nikšić
- President: Miomir Bakrač
- Manager: Milorad Peković
- League: Montenegrin First League
- 2025–26: Montenegrin First League, 1st of 10 (champions)
- Website: fksutjeska.me
Home colours	Away colours

Fudbalski klub Sutjeska (Montenegrin Cyrillic: Фудбалски клуб Сутјеска) is a professional association football club from Nikšić, Montenegro, currently competing in the Montenegrin First League. The club was established in 1920, and has been known by its current name since 1945. Since the Montenegrin independence in 2006, the club has won 6 First League titles. FK Sutjeska Nikšić is a part of the Sutjeska Sports Society.

== History ==
=== During the Kingdom of Yugoslavia (1927–1941) ===
FK Sutjeska was founded in 1927 under the name Sports' club Hajduk (SK Hajduk). Later on the club changed its name to SK Hercegovac.
Under the name SK Hajduk, the team debuted in official competitions at 1929 – as a participant of Montenegrin Football Championship which was the biggest success at that time. The team from Nikšić were playing in the Montenegrin Championship Finals against SK Crnogorac Cetinje (1–2). During the season 1932, SK Hercegovac played their first official game against FK Budućnost (1–2) and that was the first edition of the Montenegrin Derby – the biggest rivalry in Montenegrin football.
Until 1940, the team from Nikšić played only once in the Championship finals. After the beginning of World War II – the team got dissolved.

=== After World War II (1945–1984) ===
After the war, the club was refounded (1945) under the name Sutjeska in honour of Yugoslav communists killed in the Battle of Sutjeska. The first game they played after the war was on 3 May 1945, against FK Budućnost in Podgorica (2–4). Soon after that, team from Nikšić played in the first football competition after World War II – 1946 Montenegrin Republic League, finishing third at the end of the season.
First significant success Sutjeska made after the war was on the 1948/49 season, with gaining promotion to the Yugoslav Third League. During 1955–1964, Sutjeska played nine consecutive seasons in the Yugoslav Second League. As a member of the Second League, Sutjeska participated in semifinals of the 1962–63 Yugoslav Cup.
During the 1963–64 season Sutjeska finished as the champion of the Yugoslav Second League, Sutjeska was promoted to the top-tier competition of SFR Yugoslavia. They debuted in the Yugoslav First League on 9 August 1964, against Dinamo Zagreb. During the sixties and seventies, Sutjeska played four seasons in the First League. On season 1971–72, game between Sutjeska and Crvena Zvezda in Nikšić was attended by 19,000 spectators which broke the record for the highest attendance on a Sutjeska home game.
During the 1973-74 season, FK Sutjeska debuted in official international competitions. They represented Yugoslavia in the Balkans Cup, finishing second in Group A against Târgu Mureș and Elbasani.

=== Transition years (1984–2006) ===
FK Sutjeska returned to the Yugoslav First League in the 1984–85 season. This time, they spent four consecutive seasons in the top-tier. The best result in the First league Sutjeska made was on the 1984–85 season, finishing ninth. During these seasons, FK Sutjeska and FK Budućnost played the first editions of the Montenegrin Derby in the Yugoslav First League.
Together with Budućnost, FK Sutjeska is one of the two football clubs from Montenegro that have competed in the first league of SFR Yugoslavia. As a result, FK Sutjeska gained considerable prestige and international reputation, and therefore remains one of the biggest sporting institutions in Montenegro. It is the most recognized sports organization in the city of Nikšić.
After the breakup of Yugoslavia, Sutjeska remained at the top football league in FR Yugoslavia. After a great season in 2003, Sutjeska had a notable appearance in European competition in which they eliminated Racing FC Union Luxembourg in the UEFA Intertoto Cup, but lost in the next round against Tampere United.

=== Recent history (2006–) ===
Following Montenegrin independence, Sutjeska became a member of the Montenegrin First League. First significant success at that time, the team made was in the Montenegrin Cup 2006–07. They played in the finals, but lost against FK Rudar (1–2). After finishing third on the 2008–09 season, Sutjeska debuted in the UEFA Europa League, but they were eliminated by FC Partizan Minsk from Belarus (1–1; 1–2).
FK Sutjeska won their first league title on season 2012–13, with five points more than FK Budućnost. During that season, FK Sutjeska home games were watched by more than 7,000 spectators, which was the record-high since the eighties. As Montenegrin champions, Sutjeska participated in UEFA Champions League 2013-14 qualifiers, with elimination in the second round, against Moldavian side FC Sheriff.
On season 2013–14, FK Sutjeska became the first Montenegrin club to win two league titles in a row. They won the title after the long and dramatic race with FK Lovćen and gained a new opportunity to participate in UEFA Champions League. On second qualifying round, FK Sutjeska again failed against FC Sheriff.
Sutjeska played in 2015–16 UEFA Europa League, with two dramatic games against Hungarian-side Debreceni VSC (2–0; 0–3).
During the 2016–17 season, FK Sutjeska made more success, this time in the Montenegrin Cup. For the second time in their history, they played in a Cup final, but this time they won the title, winning a game against OFK Grbalj (1–0).
From 2017, FK Sutjeska played two impressive seasons, with two new titles and successful result in European competitions. On season 2017–18, led by Nikšić-born manager Nikola Rakojević, they won the title with 22 points more than their biggest rivals and runners-up FK Budućnost. Except that, Sutjeska player Igor Ivanović became the top scorer of the season. Next year, FK Sutjeska, again with the head coach Rakojević, defended the title, this time after more intensive struggle with FK Budućnost. A month later, team from Nikšić made good result in 2019–20 Champions League, as they eliminated Slovan Bratislava in the first leg of qualifiers. They got eliminated on the next stage, against APOEL.
After three consecutive seasons finished with domestic trophies, FK Sutjeska performances on the 2019–20 season were lower, so they finished as runner-ups. During the season, they made biggest away win in the history of Montenegrin Derby, against FK Budućnost in Podgorica (4–1). Except that, they were among the semifinalists of Montenegrin Cup, but the competition was interrupted due to COVID-19.

== Name changes ==
During their history, FK Sutjeska participated under three different names. Most of the period, they played under today's name.

Period	Name	Full name
1927–1930	SK Hajduk	Sportski klub "Hajduk" / Sport Club "Hajduk"
1930–1941	SK Hercegovac	Sportski klub "Hercegovac" / Sport Club "Hercegovac"
1945–	FK Sutjeska	Fudbalski klub "Sutjeska" / Football Club "Sutjeska"

== List of competitive matches (1946–present) ==
Below is an overall score of all matches of FK Sutjeska in official competitions since 1946. More details at page List of FK Sutjeska seasons.

Competition Level	Seasons	First season	Last season	Matches	W	D	L	GD
First League	34	1964–65	2019–20	1137	526	260	451	1371:1461
Second League	30	1955–56	2005–06	880	425	158	217	1462:1071
Third League	1	1949–50	1949–50	22	3	5	14	16:42
Republic League	10	1946	1976–77	126	85	15	26	334:131
Playoffs	10	1946–47	2010–11	32	13	7	12	37:48
National Cup	49	1947–48	2019–20	119	48	22	49	157:141
UEFA competitions	8	2003–04	2019–20	24	2	8	14	15:37
Balkans Cup	1	1972–73	1972–73	4	2	0	2	2:4
OVERALL (1946–)				2344	1104	475	785	3394:2935

== Sutjeska in European competitions ==
FK Sutjeska debuted in European competitions in 2003, when they played in the UEFA Intertoto Cup. After Montenegrin independence, Sutjeska played often in UEFA competitions, with two seasons in the Champions League qualifiers. Except participation in UEFA competitions, during the history Sutjeska played once in the Balkans Cup.

=== UEFA competitions ===
Competition	Seasons	First	Last	Pld	W	D	L	GF	GA	GD
UEFA Champions League	5	2013–14	2022–23	12	0	3	9	3	23	-20
UEFA Europa League	6	2009–10	2020–21	11	1	3	7	8	16	–8
UEFA Europa Conference League	4	2021–22	2025–26	14	4	4	6	13	18	–5
Intertoto Cup	1	2003	2003	4	1	2	1	4	2	+2
OVERALL	16 seasons			37	6	12	23	28	59	-31

=== Balkans Cup ===
FK Sutjeska played one season in the Balkans Cup, a regional competition for clubs from Yugoslavia, Albania, Bulgaria, Greece, Romania and Turkey. In the 1973-74 season, they played against Romanian team Târgu Mureș and Elbasani from Albania, finishing second in Group A.

== Honours and achievements ==
National Championships – 6

- Montenegrin First League:
  - Winners (6): 2012–13, 2013–14, 2017–18, 2018–19, 2021–22, 2025–26

National Cups – 2

- Montenegrin Cup:
  - Winners (2): 2016–17, 2022–23

== Supporters and rivalries ==
"The Dukes" (Vojvode) is the name for the most ardent Sutjeska fans. They were established in 1988 in Nikšić and today constitute one of the most numerous groups of supporters in Montenegro. Their place is in the eastern stand, and they traditionally follow all the matches of all sports that compete under the "Sutjeska" name, both home and away matches. Their biggest rivals are FK Budućnost Podgorica, as the "Barbarians" (Varvari) are the other large group of supporters in the country. They also have a rivalry with Fap mašina of Čelik Nikšić, with whom they contest the Nikšić derby.

== Youth program ==
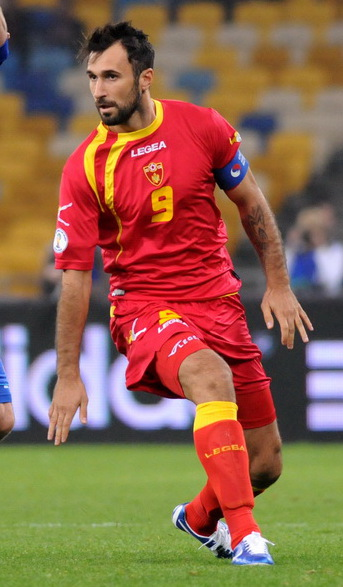
Mirko Vučinić began his career at Sutjeska.

Sutjeska's youth academy is one of the most famous and recognized in Montenegro along with FK Budućnost. The first Sutjeska player to have been selected for the Yugoslav national team was Vojin Lazarević, who would later on have a bright career with Red Star Belgrade. Lazarević was capped by the Yugoslav senior side in a friendly match against Romania in 1964 while still playing in Nikšić.

In 1976, a notably talented generation of the youth team became the champions of Yugoslavia; the team included names that would later turn to be successful football players like Brajan Nenezić, Mojaš Radonjić, and Pero Giljen. Pero's son Vladan Giljen became a successful goalkeeper after learning his trade in Sutjeska. Four years after the famed 1976 generation made its first mark in Yugoslav football, Sutjeska won the Yugoslav Cup in 1980 becoming the only Yugoslav club at the time to have won both trophies.

In 2010, Sutjeska's cadet team (for under-17 players) were champions of Montenegro in the country's U-17 league. During the same year, Sutjeska's U-19 team won the Gallipoli Cup in Italy, one of the most prestigious international tournaments for players of this age group. The U-19 teams of U.S. Lecce, A.S. Bari, FC Zenit Saint Petersburg, and FC Krylia Sovetov Samara all competed for the title which Sutjeska's youth team won.

Most notably, Sutjeska was the club in which the famous former Juventus FC striker Mirko Vučinić began his career.

== Stadium ==
City stadium "Kraj Bistrice" was built during 1946. During the history, Stadium Kraj Bistrice, was renovated a few times. During the 60's, there were stands on all four sides, and the capacity of the stadium was 15,000 spectators. After 2000, there was a renovation of the stadium. In 2001, the old south and north stands were torn down, and a new east stand was built, so capacity of stadium was reduced to 10,800 spectators. After the Montenegrin independence, following the UEFA rules, the stadium capacity was reduced to 5,214 seats. At 2015, floodlights were installed, and the first match in the night-term occurred on 7 August 2016 (FK Sutjeska – FK Lovćen). Located around the building is a spacious parking lot. The sports complex adjacent to the stadium is a modern training field with synthetic surface and a mini auditorium space.

== Players ==
=== Current squad ===
As of 9 July 2026

Note: Flags indicate national team as defined under FIFA eligibility rules; some limited exceptions apply. Players may hold more than one non-FIFA nationality.

No.	Pos.	Nation	Player
1	GK	MNE	Vladan Giljen (captain)
2	DF	MNE	Aleksa Golubović
3	MF	SEN	Mamadou Camara
4	DF	MNE	Miloš Vračar (on loan from Podgorica)
5	MF	MNE	Igor Pajović
6	MF	MNE	Deni Hočko
7	FW	MNE	Aleksandar Boljević
8	FW	JAM	Kenroy Campbell
9	FW	MNE	Petar Aničić
10	FW	MNE	Balša Tošković
11	FW	MNE	Vasilije Čavor
12	GK	MNE	Tomaš Đurović
14	FW	MNE	Marko Brnović
15	DF	MNE	Boris Kopitović
16	DF	MNE	Ognjen Đinović

No.	Pos.	Nation	Player
18	FW	MNE	Danijel Nikolić
19	MF	MNE	Aleksandar Šćekić
20	MF	MNE	Jovan Čađenović
21	MF	MNE	Danilo Ćetković
22	DF	MNE	Andrija Ražnatović
23	GK	MNE	Radoš Dubljević
25	DF	MNE	Marko Đukanović
26	FW	MNE	Jovan Mićković
30	MF	MNE	Andrija Kecojević
35	FW	MNE	Matija Gardašević
44	DF	MNE	Radoš Dedić
55	FW	SRB	Slobodan Babić
72	DF	MNE	Anto Babić
77	MF	MNE	Marko Šimun
99	FW	MNE	Marko Mrvaljević

=== Out on loan ===
Note: Flags indicate national team as defined under FIFA eligibility rules; some limited exceptions apply. Players may hold more than one non-FIFA nationality.

No.	Pos.	Nation	Player
—	DF	MNE	Bojan Damjanović (at Košice until 30 June 2027)

=== Player records ===
- Most performances: (Socialist Federal Republic of Yugoslavia) Brajan Nenezić – 293/37 (1975–1989)
- Top goalscorer: (Socialist Federal Republic of Yugoslavia) Željko Bajčeta – 43 (1980–1990)

=== Notable players ===
For the list of former and current players with Wikipedia article, please see Category:FK Sutjeska Nikšić players.

During the history, several notable players started their career or played for FK Sutjeska. Most known are Nikšić-born players Mirko Vučinić, Andrija Delibašić, Miodrag Bajović, Miladin Bečanović, Vojin Lazarević, Branko Samatović, Pero Giljen, Nebojša Bandović and Brajan Nenezić. The player with the most appearances is Brajan Nenezić, who played 293 matches in the 1975–1989 period.

Below is a list of players who, during their career, played for FK Sutjeska and represented their countries at the full international level.

- (Socialist Federal Republic of Yugoslavia) Zoran Batrović
- (Socialist Federal Republic of Yugoslavia) Miloš Bursać
- (Socialist Federal Republic of Yugoslavia) Miodrag Krivokapić
- (Socialist Federal Republic of Yugoslavia) Vojin Lazarević
- (Serbia and Montenegro) Zoran Banović
- (Serbia and Montenegro) Damir Čakar
- (Serbia and Montenegro) Zoran Jovičić
- (Serbia and Montenegro) Vladan Kostić
- (Serbia and Montenegro) Duško Radinović
- (Serbia and Montenegro) (Montenegro) Mirko Vučinić
- (Serbia and Montenegro) (Montenegro) Vukašin Poleksić
- (Montenegro) Marko Ćetković
- (Montenegro) Andrija Delibašić
- (Montenegro) Novica Eraković
- (Montenegro) Blažo Igumanović
- (Montenegro) Branislav Janković
- (Montenegro) Ivan Janjušević
- (Montenegro) Vlado Jeknić
- (Montenegro) Šaleta Kordić
- (Montenegro) Stefan Lončar
- (Montenegro) Milutin Osmajić
- (Montenegro) Srđan Radonjić
- (Montenegro) Darko Zorić
- (Montenegro) Marko Šimun
- (Bosnia and Herzegovina) Milenko Milošević
- (Bulgaria) Predrag Pažin
- (Indonesia) Ilija Spasojević
- (Jordan) Anzour Nafash
- (Libya) Zakaria Alharaish
- (North Macedonia) Darko Krsteski
- (North Macedonia) Milovan Petrovikj
- (Slovenia) Rene Mihelič

== Coaching staff ==
Current technical staff
- Head coach: (Montenegro) Milorad Peković
- Assistant coach: (Montenegro) Miloš Nikezić
- Assistant coach: (Montenegro) Boris Miličković
- Assistant coach: (Montenegro) Dejan Miljanić
- Goalkeeping coach: (Montenegro) Mato Đurković
- Fitness coach: (Montenegro) Ivan Đuričković
- Fitness coach: (Montenegro) Mladen Vučić
- Physiotherapist: (Montenegro) Ivan Matović
- Physiotherapist: (Montenegro) Marko Kovačević
- Doctor: (Montenegro) Veselin Bulatović
- Economist: (Montenegro) Joko Mitrović
- Sporting director: (Montenegro) Đorđije Ćetković

=== Coaching history ===
- (Socialist Federal Republic of Yugoslavia) Ljubiša Spajić
- (Socialist Federal Republic of Yugoslavia) Stevan Čulik
- (Socialist Federal Republic of Yugoslavia) Milan Panić
- (Socialist Federal Republic of Yugoslavia) Blažo Đurović
- (Socialist Federal Republic of Yugoslavia) Sreto Stanojević
- (Socialist Federal Republic of Yugoslavia) Savo Stanišić
- (Socialist Federal Republic of Yugoslavia) Dragoslav Filipović
- (Socialist Federal Republic of Yugoslavia) Anton Habić
- (Socialist Federal Republic of Yugoslavia) Mihailo Koprivica
- (Socialist Federal Republic of Yugoslavia) Slava Stefanović
- (Socialist Federal Republic of Yugoslavia) Aleksandar Petrović
- (Socialist Federal Republic of Yugoslavia) Vojin Božović
- (Socialist Federal Republic of Yugoslavia) Živko Popadić
- (Socialist Federal Republic of Yugoslavia) Bimo Harović
- (Socialist Federal Republic of Yugoslavia) Josip Takač
- (Socialist Federal Republic of Yugoslavia) Milence Petrović
- (Socialist Federal Republic of Yugoslavia) Ilija Rajković
- (Socialist Federal Republic of Yugoslavia) Boris Marović
- (Socialist Federal Republic of Yugoslavia) Ilija Kaljević
- (Socialist Federal Republic of Yugoslavia) Vasilije Šijaković (1968–1969)
- (Socialist Federal Republic of Yugoslavia) Dragoljub Milošević (1969–1970)
- (Socialist Federal Republic of Yugoslavia) Srećko Petković (1970)
- (Socialist Federal Republic of Yugoslavia) Dragutin Spasojević (1970–1972)
- (Socialist Federal Republic of Yugoslavia) Božidar Drenovac (1972–1973)
- (Socialist Federal Republic of Yugoslavia) Vasilije Darmanović
- (Socialist Federal Republic of Yugoslavia) Munib Saračević (1974–1975)
- (Socialist Federal Republic of Yugoslavia) Milan Zirojević
- (Socialist Federal Republic of Yugoslavia) Ratomir Čabrić
- (Socialist Federal Republic of Yugoslavia) Srboljub Markušević
- (Socialist Federal Republic of Yugoslavia) Bruno Repar (1977-1978)
- (Socialist Federal Republic of Yugoslavia) Novak Bulatović
- (Socialist Federal Republic of Yugoslavia) Vlatko Vujošević
- (Socialist Federal Republic of Yugoslavia) Milan Živadinović (1980-1981)
- (Socialist Federal Republic of Yugoslavia) Milovan Đorić (1983-1986)
- (Socialist Federal Republic of Yugoslavia) Vukašin Višnjevac (1986-1987)
- (Socialist Federal Republic of Yugoslavia) Nedeljko Gugolj
- (Socialist Federal Republic of Yugoslavia) Mojaš Radonjić
- (Socialist Federal Republic of Yugoslavia) Drago Kovačević
- (Socialist Federal Republic of Yugoslavia) Dragutin Spasojević (1989–1990)
- (Socialist Federal Republic of Yugoslavia) Milovan Đorić (1990–1991)
- (Socialist Federal Republic of Yugoslavia) Drago Kovačević (1991–1992)
- (Federal Republic of Yugoslavia) Nikola Rakojević (1992–1993)
- (Federal Republic of Yugoslavia) Mirko Minić
- (Federal Republic of Yugoslavia) Rajko Nikolić (1994)
- (Federal Republic of Yugoslavia) Nikola Rakojević (1994–1995)
- (Federal Republic of Yugoslavia) Stanislav Karasi
- (Federal Republic of Yugoslavia) Vlada Pejović (1996)
- (Federal Republic of Yugoslavia) Dragutin Spasojević (1996–1998)
- (Serbia and Montenegro) Dragoljub Bekvalac (1998–1999)
- (Serbia and Montenegro) Žarko Olarević (1999–2000)
- (Serbia and Montenegro) Pero Giljen (2000)
- (Bosnia and Herzegovina) Nenad Starovlah (2000–2001)
- (Serbia and Montenegro) Vojin Lazarević (2001)
- (Serbia and Montenegro) Brajan Nenezić (2001–2002)
- (Serbia and Montenegro) Pero Giljen (2002)
- (Serbia and Montenegro) Branko Smiljanić (2002–2003)
- (Serbia and Montenegro) Jovan Gardašević (2003)
- (Serbia and Montenegro) Slavenko Kuzeljević (2003)
- (Serbia and Montenegro) Miodrag Bajović (2004)
- (Serbia and Montenegro) Pero Giljen (2005)
- (Serbia and Montenegro) Branko Smiljanić (2005)
- (Montenegro) Brajan Nenezić (2006)
- (Montenegro) Pero Giljen (2006–2008)
- (Montenegro) Brajan Nenezić (2008)
- (Montenegro) Nikola Rakojević (2008–2010)
- (Montenegro) Pero Giljen (2010)
- (Montenegro) Nikola Rakojević (January 2011–April 2011)
- (Montenegro) Dragan Mijanović (April 2011–June 2011)
- (Serbia) Dragan Lacmanović (July 2011–October 2011)
- (Montenegro) Slaviša Mirković (October 2011–March 2012)
- (Montenegro) Saša Petrović (March 2012–May 2012)
- (Montenegro) Dragan Radojičić (June 2012–May 2014)
- (Serbia) Mile Tomić (June 2014–March 2015)
- (Montenegro) Brajan Nenezić (March 2015–July 2015)
- (Montenegro) Aleksandar Nedović (July 2015–May 2016)
- (Montenegro) Nebojša Jovović (June 2016–February 2017)
- (Montenegro) Nikola Rakojević (February 2017–July 2020)
- (Montenegro) Dragan Radojičić (July 2020–November 2020)
- (Montenegro) Miljan Radović (November 2020–May 2021)
- (Montenegro) Milija Savović (June 2021–August 2022)
- (Montenegro) Nenad Brnović (August 2022–August 2023)
- (Serbia) Vladimir Janković (August 2023–December 2023)
- (Montenegro) Dragan Mijanović (December 2023–)

== Sponsors ==
- Official kit supplier – (2018–2019) NAAI, (2019–2025) Joma, (2025–) Ardu Sport

== See also ==
- List of FK Sutjeska Nikšić seasons
- Montenegrin Derby
- Montenegrin First League
- Montenegrin clubs in Yugoslav football competitions (1946–2006)
- Nikšić
- KK Sutjeska Nikšić
- RK Sutjeska Nikšić
