= Vladan Kostić =

Montenegrin footballer

Personal information
- Full name: Vladan Kostić
- Date of birth: 25 April 1977 (age 49)
- Place of birth: Nikšić, SFR Yugoslavia
- Height: 1.89 m (6 ft 2 1/2 in)
- Position: Midfielder

Senior career*
Years	Team	Apps	(Gls)
1997–2004	Sutjeska Nikšić	132	(6)
2004–2005	Vojvodina	9	(0)
2005	FC Baku	0	(0)
2006	Vardar	0	(0)
2006–2007	Željezničar Sarajevo	7	(0)

International career
2001	FR Yugoslavia (unofficial)	3	(0)
- * Club domestic league appearances and goals

Vladan Kostić (Serbian Cyrillic: Владан Костић; born 25 April 1977) is a Montenegrin retired footballer.

== International career ==
He has played for the FR Yugoslavia national team at the Millennium Super Soccer Cup, in India, held in January 2001, having played three matches. Some sources, the Serbian Federation as well, do not count this tournament matches as official.
