= Brondi =

Brondi may refer to:

- Brondi (company), telecommunications company established in Italy
- Brondi (surname), Italian surname
