= Rita Brondi =

Italian composer

Maria Rita Brondi
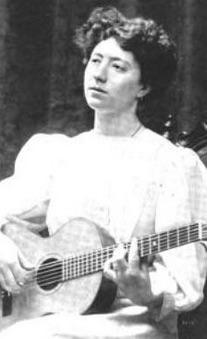
- Born: 5 July 1889; Rimini
- Died: 1 July 1941; Rome
- Occupation(s): Musician, composer, writer

Maria Rita Brondi (5 July 1889 – 1 July 1941) was an Italian guitarist, lutenist, singer, composer, and music historian. She gave concerts throughout Europe as a guitarist and singer, conducted research on lute and guitar history, and composed guitar pieces. She was also an editor for the Enciclopedia Italiana.

== Early life ==
Maria Rita Brondi was born in Rimini in 1884 or 1889. She was taught guitar first by her father, who was a noted performer, and then studied guitar with Luigi Mozzani, and then travelled to Barcelona to receive lessons from Francisco Tárrega. She later studied voice with Paolo Tosti in England and composition with M. Manozzi. Tárrega dedicated a solo guitar composition to Brondi, calling her his favourite pupil.

== Career ==
Brondi toured in Europe as a guitarist and singer, known for singing Italian regional folk songs. She performed for Queen Margherita in Rome, and for a number of other titled people, including the Duchess of Aosta in Turin, and Princess Bona Adelaide and the Duke of Ancona. She performed more than 500 concerts during the World War I. She was also a composer of guitar works. She wrote a book on the history of the guitar, titled Il liuto e la chitarra (1926), which was published in several editions through the twentieth century. She was mentioned as a peer of Italian musicians Elisabetta Oddone (1878–1972) and Geni Sadero (also known as Eugenia Scarpa, 1886–1961), though both of them outlived her. Julian Bream mentioned her as making early lute recordings, in company with Suzanne Bloch and Diana Poulton. Brondi was also an editor for the Enciclopedia Italiana.

== Personal life ==
Brondi died at age 51 in Rome, in 1941. Her compositions are still played and recorded, for example on a collection titled Guitar Music by Women Composers (2009), by Dutch guitarist Annette Kruisbrink.
