= Cavit Gökalp =

Turkish footballer (1938–1987)

Personal information
- Date of birth: 3 April 1938
- Place of birth: Adapazarı, Turkey
- Date of death: 6 May 1987 (aged 49)
- Position: Goalkeeper

International career
Years	Team	Apps	(Gls)
- Turkey

Cavit Gökalp (3 April 1938 – 6 May 1987) was a Turkish footballer. He competed in the men's tournament at the 1960 Summer Olympics.
