= Brajan Nenezić =

Montenegrin football manager and player

Personal information
- Date of birth: 1 September 1953 (age 73)
- Place of birth: Nikšić, PR Montenegro, FPR Yugoslavia
- Position: Midfielder

Youth career
- Sutjeska Nikšić

Senior career*
Years	Team	Apps	(Gls)
1972–1973	Leotar	33	(3)
1973–1989	Sutjeska Nikšić	377	(50)
Total		410	(53)

International career
1978	Yugoslavia Amateurs	2	(0)

Managerial career
- Bokelj
- 1999–2001: Mornar
- 2001–2002: Sutjeska Nikšić
- 2006–2007: Leotar
- 2008: Sutjeska Nikšić
- 2009–2010: Mornar
- 2015: Sutjeska Nikšić
- 2016–2017: Igalo
- 2019–2020: Obilić Herceg Novi
- * Club domestic league appearances and goals

Brajan Nenezić (Montenegrin Cyrillic: Брајан Ненезић; born 1 September 1953) is a Montenegrin football manager and former player.

== Club career ==
After making his senior debut with Leotar in the 1972–73 season, Nenezić spent the rest of his career with Sutjeska Nikšić until 1989, making over 300 appearances in the Yugoslav First League and Second League combined.

== International career ==
In May 1978, Nenezić represented Yugoslavia at the UEFA Amateur Cup, helping the team win the tournament.

== Managerial career ==
During his managerial career, Nenezić served as manager of Sutjeska Nikšić on several occasions, lastly in 2015. He was also manager of Leotar in the 2006–07 season.

== Honours ==
Sutjeska Nikšić

- Yugoslav Second League: 1983–84 (Group East)
