= Eugenia Scarpa =

Italian soprano, pianist, and composer

- Born: 12 May 1886; Constantinople (today Istanbul, Turkey) or Trieste, Italy
- Died: 7 August 1961 (aged 75)
- Other name: Geni Sadero
- Occupations: composer, singer, and teacher

Eugenia Scarpa (12 May 1886 – 7 August 1961) was a composer, singer, and teacher from an Italian family who is best known by her pseudonym, Geni Sadero. She composed her own songs and arranged many Italian folk songs for voice and piano. Her students included contralto Marian Anderson.

Conflicting sources list Scarpa's birthplace as Constantinople (today Istanbul, Turkey) or Trieste, Italy. Her father was a military commander in Trieste. Scarpa studied piano with Oscar Taverna. She debuted as an opera singer at Teatro Lirico in Milan in 1914. Five years later, she moved to Paris, where she sang and lectured about Italian folk songs. During World War I, Scarpa sang to entertain soldiers and also collected folk songs from them, which she later arranged for voice and piano. In 1920, she gave at least one well-reviewed vocal recital in England, with a program of Italian folk songs. Scarpa visited the tenor Enrico Caruso shortly before his death in 1921. Composer Fernando Liuzzi dedicated a group of his folk song settings to her in the mid 1920s. In 1927 she returned to Trieste, and later taught at the Accademia di Santa Cecilia in Rome.

Scarpa sang for at least one recording by RCA Victor. She appeared in the films Affairs of Maupassant and La Canzone dell'Amore (The Song of Love 1930). Her song "Fa la Nana Bambin" was used in the soundtrack of the film Två Människor. Scarpa's songs were performed and recorded by Marian Anderson, Victoria de Los Angeles, Erno Balogh, Dusolina Giannini, Tito Gobbi, Toti dal Monte, Gianna Pederzini, the Phillips Jenkins Singers, Rosa Ponselle, Mafalda Napolitana le Quaration, Tito Schipa, Ferruccio Tagliavini and Gil Valeriano.

Scarpa's music was published by Allans Music, Carish e Janichen, Casa Musicale Francesco Bongiovanni, G. Schirmer Inc. and Società Anonima Notari. Her works include:

== Musical Theater ==
- Swallow (comedy in three acts arranged from Rondinella)

== Songs ==
- "Amuri, Amuri"
- "Barcarola de la Marangona"
- "Canto Pugliese del Crepuscolo" (English text by Theodore Baker)
- "Canzone dei Carrettieri Pugliesi" (English text by Theodore Baker)
- "Canzonetta Romagnola" (English text by Theodore Baker)
- "Come Quando Tira Vento"
- "Curi, Curuzzu"
- "E l'Acina di ri Pepe"
- "E Quanna tu Canta"
- "Era la Vo"
- "Fa la Nana Bambin"
- "Figlio, Dormi"
- "Gondoliera Veneziana" (English text by Theodore Baker)
- "I Battitori di Grano"
- "I Dodici Mesi"
- "I Manin"
- "I Tre Tamburi"
- "Il Mazzetto"
- "In Mezzo al Mar"
- "La Donna Lombarda" (English text by Theodore Baker)
- "L'Altra Sera la Mia Nina"
- L'Amour xe una Pietanza"
- "L'Amour"
- "La Barcarola Della Marangona"
- "La Vergine e il Fabbro"
- Le Piu Belle Canzoni d'Italia (Collection)
- "Michelemma"
- "Ninin Canzonetta Lombarda" (English text by Theodore Baker)
- "Ninna Nanna Toscana" (English text by Theodore Baker)
- "Pampina, Pampinedda"
- "Se te Tocco"
- "Serenata delle Alpi" (English text by Theodore Baker)
- "Serenata Siciliana" (English text by Theodore Baker)
- "Stornellata Romanesca" (English text by Theodore Baker)
- "Stornello Pugliese" (English text by Theodore Baker)
- "Susanna Vatt'a Veste"
- "Tarantella Napoletana" (English text by Theodore Baker)
- "Ti te Set in Lett"
- "Venezia Bella Coro Tre Voci"
