= Adil Abdullah =

Iraqi footballer

Personal information
- Date of birth: 1 January 1923
- Place of birth: Baghdad, Iraq
- Date of death: 1 July 1986 (aged 63)
- Place of death: Baghdad, Iraq
- Position: Forward

International career
Years	Team	Apps	(Gls)
1959–1964	Iraq	5	(5)

Adil Abdullah (Arabic: عَادِل عَبْد الله; 1 January 1923 – 1 July 1986) was an Iraqi with Turkish origin international footballer who played as a forward.

He earned five caps and scored five goals for Iraq, with all five goals coming during 1960 Olympics qualification against Lebanon.

== Career statistics ==
=== International goals ===
Scores and results list Iraq's goal tally first.

No	Date	Venue	Opponent	Score	Result	Competition
1.	15 November 1959	Beirut	Lebanon	3–0	3–0	1960 Olympics qualifiers
2.	25 November 1959	Baghdad	Lebanon	2–0	8–0	1960 Olympics qualifiers
3.	25 November 1959	Baghdad	Lebanon	4–0	8–0	1960 Olympics qualifiers
4.	25 November 1959	Baghdad	Lebanon	5–0	8–0	1960 Olympics qualifiers
5.	25 November 1959	Baghdad	Lebanon	7–0	8–0	1960 Olympics qualifiers
