= Mustafa Ertan =

Turkish footballer (1926–2005)

Personal information
- Date of birth: 21 April 1926
- Place of birth: Ankara, Turkey
- Date of death: 17 December 2005 (aged 79)
- Place of death: Bursa, Turkey
- Height: 1.71 m (5 ft 7 in)
- Position: Defender

Senior career*
Years	Team	Apps	(Gls)
1959–1961	Beşiktaş	29	(3)
1961–1964	Türk Telekomspor		

International career
1949–1961	Turkey	29	(1)

Managerial career
- 1961–62: Türk Telekomspor
- 1964–1965: Türk Telekomspor
- 1965–66: Hacettepe
- 1967–68: Şekerspor
- 1969–70: Ankaragücü
- 1972–73: Trabzonspor
- 1973–74: Bursaspor
- 1975–76: Bursaspor
- * Club domestic league appearances and goals

Mustafa Ertan (21 April 1926 – 17 December 2005) was a Turkish football defender who played for Turkey in the 1954 FIFA World Cup. He also played for MKE Ankaragücü and competed for Turkey at the 1952 Summer Olympics and the 1960 Summer Olympics.
