= Dimitar Largov =

Bulgarian footballer (1936–2020)

Personal information
- Full name: Dimitar Simeonov Largov
- Date of birth: 10 September 1936
- Place of birth: Sofia, Bulgaria
- Date of death: 26 November 2020 (aged 84)
- Place of death: Sofia, Bulgaria
- Position: Midfielder

Youth career
- 1946–1953: Cherveno Zname Sofia

Senior career*
Years	Team	Apps	(Gls)
1954–1955	Septemvri Sofia	?	(?)
1956–1967	Slavia Sofia	220	(19)

International career
1959–1966	Bulgaria	20	(0)
- * Club domestic league appearances and goals

Dimitar Simeonov Largov (Bulgarian: Димитър Симеонов Ларгов; 10 September 1936 – 26 November 2020) was a Bulgarian football midfielder who played for Bulgaria in the 1966 FIFA World Cup. He also played for Septemvri Sofia and Slavia Sofia. He also competed in the men's tournament at the 1960 Summer Olympics.
