= Ivan Brondi =

Brazilian footballer (born 1941)

Personal information
- Full name: Ivan Brondi de Carvalho
- Date of birth: 7 October 1941 (age 85)
- Position: Midfielder

Senior career*
Years	Team	Apps	(Gls)
- Palmeiras
- * Club domestic league appearances and goals

Ivan Brondi de Carvalho (born 7 October 1941) is a Brazilian former footballer. He was part of the Brazil national team that competed in the 1960 Summer Olympics.
