= Adel Hekal =

Egyptian footballer (1934–2018)

Personal information
- Full name: Mohamed Ahmed Adel Hekal
- Date of birth: 23 March 1934
- Place of birth: Cairo, Egypt
- Date of death: 22 September 2018 (aged 84)
- Place of death: Cairo, Egypt
- Position: Goalkeeper

Senior career*
Years	Team	Apps	(Gls)
1950–1969	Al-Ahly		

International career
1956–1962	Egypt		
Medal record
Men's Football
Representing United Arab Republic
Africa Cup of Nations
Winner	1959 United Arab Republic
Runner-up	1962 Ethiopia
- * Club domestic league appearances and goals

Mohamed Ahmed Adel Hekal (Arabic: محمد أحمد عادل هيكل; 23 March 1934 – 22 September 2018) was an Egyptian footballer who played as a goalkeeper for Al-Ahly. He also played for the Egyptian national team, and was part of the team that won the 1959 Africa Cup of Nations, and represented his country in the 1960 Summer Olympics.

== Artistic activity ==
He appeared as a guest of honor at the movie A Rumor of Love (Eshaet Hob Arabic: إشاعة حب) in 1959 as himself, he also appeared at the movie Schoolgirl Diary (Mozakarat Telmeza Arabic: مذكرات تلميذة) in 1962, and Talk of the City (Hadeth Al-Madina Arabic: حديث المدينة) in 1964.

== Honours ==
United Arab Republic

- African Cup of Nations: 1959; runner-up, 1962
