= Ivan Dimitrov (footballer) =

Bulgarian footballer (1935–2019)

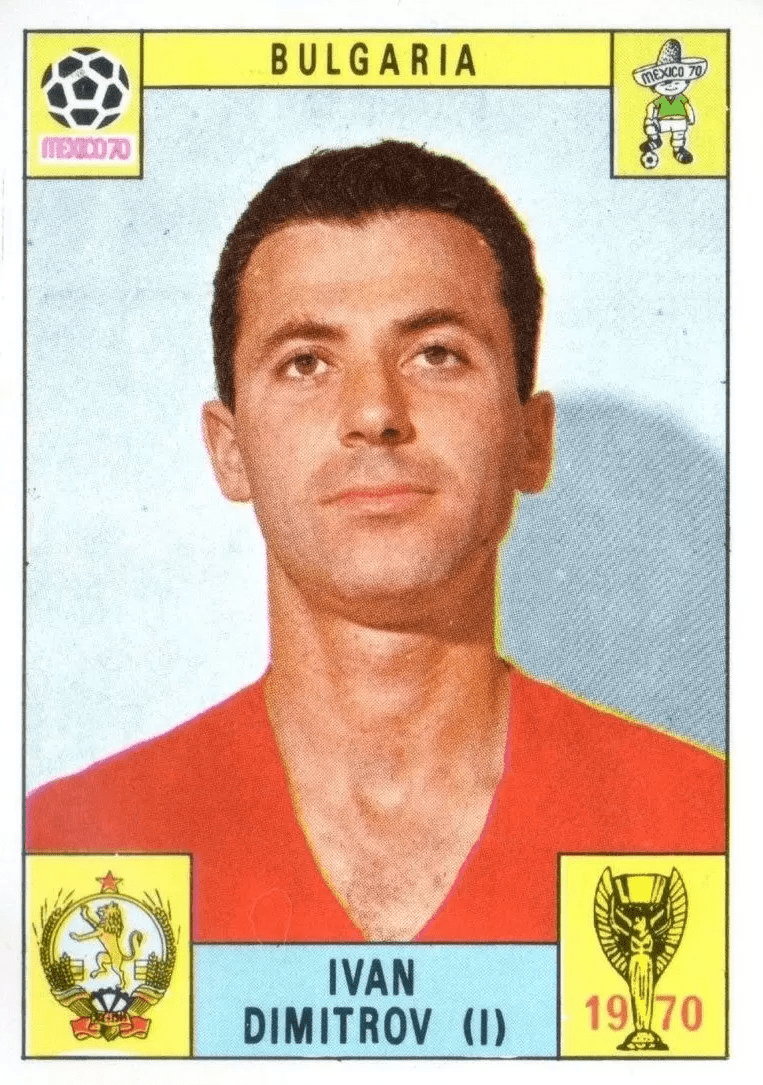
- Dimitrov at the 1970 FIFA World Cup

Personal information
- Full name: Ivan Milanov Dimitrov
- Date of birth: 14 May 1935
- Place of birth: Sofia, Kingdom of Bulgaria
- Date of death: 1 January 2019 (aged 83)
- Place of death: Sofia, Bulgaria
- Position: Defender

Youth career
- Akademik Sofia

Senior career*
Years	Team	Apps	(Gls)
1953	Stroitel Sofia		
1954	Torpedo Sofia		
1955	Zavod 12 Sofia		
1956–1965	Lokomotiv Sofia	215	(2)
1965–1969	Spartak Sofia		
1969–1971	Akademik Sofia	32	(0)

International career
1957–1970	Bulgaria	70	(1)
- * Club domestic league appearances and goals

Ivan Milanov Dimitrov (Bulgarian: Иван Миланов Димитров; 14 May 1935 – 1 January 2019) was a Bulgarian footballer who played as a defender for the Bulgaria national team. At club level, he made 340 appearances in the Bulgarian League, playing for Stroitel Sofia, Torpedo Sofia, Zavod 12 Sofia, Lokomotiv Sofia, Spartak Sofia and Akademik Sofia.

Dimitrov was capped 70 times for the Bulgaria national football team. He appeared in the 1962 and 1970 FIFA World Cups. He also competed in the men's tournament at the 1960 Summer Olympics. He died on 1 January 2019 at the age of 83.

== Honours ==
Lokomotiv Sofia

- Bulgarian League: 1963–64

Spartak Sofia

- Bulgarian Cup: 1967–68
