= Tariq Selim =

Egyptian footballer (1937-2016)

Personal information
- Date of birth: 15 July 1937
- Place of birth: Alexandria, Egypt
- Date of death: 16 July 2016 (aged 79)
- Place of death: Cairo, Egypt
- Position: Forward

International career
Years	Team	Apps	(Gls)
- Egypt
Medal record
Men's Football
Representing Egypt
Africa Cup of Nations
Winner	1957 Sudan
Representing United Arab Republic
Africa Cup of Nations
Winner	1959 United Arab Republic

Tariq Tawfiq Selim (15 July 1937 – 16 July 2016) was an Egyptian footballer. He competed in the men's tournament at the 1960 Summer Olympics.

== Honours ==
Egypt

- African Cup of Nations: 1957

United Arab Republic

- African Cup of Nations: 1959
