= Iliya Kirchev =

Bulgarian footballer (1932–1997)

Personal information
- Date of birth: 28 December 1932
- Place of birth: Dolni Chiflik, Bulgaria
- Date of death: 11 September 1997 (aged 64)
- Place of death: Varna, Bulgaria
- Position: Defender

Senior career*
Years	Team	Apps	(Gls)
1951–1965	Spartak Varna	319	(3)

International career
1957–1963	Bulgaria	7	(0)

Managerial career
- 1973–1974: Spartak Varna
- 1978–1979: Spartak Varna
Medal record
Representing Bulgaria
Summer Olympic Games
Bronze medal – third place	1956 Melbourne	Team
- * Club domestic league appearances and goals

Iliya Kirchev (Bulgarian: Илия Кирчев; 28 December 1932 – 11 September 1997) was a Bulgarian footballer.

== Career ==
Kirchev was a central defender. He played with PFC Spartak Varna and earned 286 caps in Bulgarian first division. For the Bulgaria national football team Kirchev featured in 7 games and won a bronze medal at the 1956 Summer Olympics. He died at the age of 64 in 1997.

== Honours ==
=== International ===
Bulgaria

- Olympic Bronze Medal: 1956
