= Nikola Parchanov =

Bulgarian footballer

Personal information
- Full name: Nikola Tachev Parchanov
- Date of birth: 19 June 1930
- Place of birth: Pleven, Bulgaria
- Date of death: 26 October 2014 (aged 84)
- Position: Goalkeeper

Senior career*
Years	Team	Apps	(Gls)
1949–1964	Spartak Pleven	201	(0)

International career
1959–1962	Bulgaria	2	(0)
- * Club domestic league appearances and goals

Nikola Tachev Parchanov (Bulgarian: Никола Тачев Пърчанов; 19 June 1930 – 26 October 2014) was a Bulgarian football goalkeeper who played for Bulgaria in the 1962 FIFA World Cup. He also played for PFC Spartak Pleven, and was part of Bulgaria's squad at the 1960 Summer Olympics, but he did not play in any matches.
