= Ergun Taner =

Turkish footballer

Personal information
- Date of birth: January 5, 1939
- Place of birth: Ergani, Turkey
- Date of death: September 2, 1996 (aged 57)
- Position: Defender

International career
Years	Team	Apps	(Gls)
- Turkey

Ergun Taner (January 5, 1939 - September 2, 1996) was a Turkish former footballer. He competed in the men's tournament at the 1960 Summer Olympics.
