= Turhan Yıldız =

Turkish footballer

Personal information
- Date of birth: 1940 (age 85–86)
- Place of birth: İzmir, Turkey

International career
Years	Team	Apps	(Gls)
- Turkey

Turhan Yıldız (born 1940) is a Turkish former footballer. He competed in the men's tournament at the 1960 Summer Olympics.
