= Aydoğan Çipiloğlu =

Turkish footballer

Personal information
- Date of birth: July 18, 1935
- Place of birth: Manisa, Turkey
- Date of death: August 3, 2007 (aged 72)
- Position: Defender

International career
Years	Team	Apps	(Gls)
- Turkey

Aydoğan Çipiloğlu (July 18, 1935 - August 3, 2007) was a Turkish former footballer. He competed in the men's tournament at the 1960 Summer Olympics.
