= Samin Uygun =

Turkish footballer

Samim Uygun
Personal information
- Date of birth: 1939
- Place of birth: Istanbul, Turkey
- Date of death: 25 December 2017 (aged 77–78)
- Place of death: Fethiye, Turkey
- Position: Forward

International career
Years	Team	Apps	(Gls)
- Turkey

Samim Uygun (1939 – 25 December 2017) was a Turkish footballer. He competed in the men's tournament at the 1960 Summer Olympics.
