= Emrullah Küçükbay =

Turkish footballer

Personal information
- Position: Goalkeeper

International career
Years	Team	Apps	(Gls)
- Turkey

Emrullah Küçükbay is a Turkish former footballer. He competed in the men's tournament at the 1960 Summer Olympics.
