= Ali Badawi =

Egyptian footballer (1940-2007)

Personal information
- Date of birth: 3 October 1940
- Place of birth: Cairo, Egypt
- Date of death: 6 December 2007 (aged 67)
- Position: Defender

International career
Years	Team	Apps	(Gls)
- Egypt

Ali Badawi (3 October 1940 – 6 December 2007) was an Egyptian footballer. He competed in the men's tournament at the 1960 Summer Olympics.
