= Stoyan Kitov =

Bulgarian footballer

Personal information
- Full name: Stoyan Kirilov Kitov
- Date of birth: 27 August 1938 (age 88)
- Place of birth: Sofia, Bulgaria
- Height: 1.74 m (5 ft 8 1/2 in)
- Position: Midfielder

Senior career*
Years	Team	Apps	(Gls)
1959–1966	Spartak Sofia		

International career
1962	Bulgaria	3	(0)
- * Club domestic league appearances and goals as of 21:05, 13 June 2010 (UTC)

Stoyan Kirilov Kitov (Bulgarian: Стоян Кирилов Китов; born 27 August 1938) is a retired Bulgarian footballer who represented his country at the 1962 and 1966 FIFA World Cups. He played as a midfielder and was a player at Spartak Sofia from 1959 until 1966. He also represented Bulgaria at the 1960 Summer Olympics in Rome, playing one match of football before his team finished 5th overall.
