= Georgi Yordanov Naydenov =

Bulgarian footballer

Personal information
- Date of birth: January 28, 1936
- Place of birth: Plovdiv, Bulgaria
- Date of death: March 11, 2025 (aged 89)
- Position: Goalkeeper

Senior career*
Years	Team	Apps	(Gls)
1961?–1967	Botev Plovdiv		

International career
1963	Bulgaria	6	(0)
- * Club domestic league appearances and goals

Georgi Yordanov Naydenov (Bulgarian: Георги Найденов; (28 January 1936 - 11 March 2025) was a Bulgarian footballer. He competed in the men's tournament at the 1960 Summer Olympics.
