= Aleksandar Kozlina =

Yugoslav footballer (1938–2013)

Personal information
- Date of birth: 20 December 1938
- Place of birth: Skrad, Kingdom of Yugoslavia
- Date of death: 10 April 2013 (aged 74)
- Place of death: Novi Sad, Serbia
- Position: Midfielder

Senior career*
Years	Team	Apps	(Gls)
1958–1966	Hajduk Split	79	(1)
1962–1964	→ Novi Sad (loan)	18	(0)
1967–1970	RFC Liégeois	54	(3)
1970–1971	Viktoria Köln		
1971–1972	Fortuna Köln		
1972–1974	Tilleur FC		
Total		151	(4)

International career
1960–1961	Yugoslavia	9	(0)
Medal record
Representing Yugoslavia
Men's Football
Gold medal – first place	1960 Rome	Team
- * Club domestic league appearances and goals

Aleksandar Kozlina (20 December 1938 – 10 April 2013) was a Yugoslav footballer.

== Club career ==
Kozlina started his professional career playing for Yugoslav powerhouse Hajduk Split in 1958. After spending four seasons at the club he was loaned out to FK Novi Sad for two seasons from 1962 to 1964. Upon his return he spent another four season with Hajduk before moving abroad and joining Belgian side RFC Liégeois in 1967. After leaving Liégeois he had spells with lower level sides Viktoria Köln, Fortuna Köln and Tilleur FC before retiring in 1974.

== International career ==
Kozlina made his debut for Yugoslavia in a January 1960 friendly match away against Morocco and earned a total of 9 caps, scoring no goals. His final international was a December 1961 friendly away against Indonesia. He was a member of the squad which won gold medal at the 1960 Summer Olympics in Rome.
