= İbrahim Yalçınkaya =

Turkish footballer

Personal information
- Date of birth: 1941 (age 84–85)
- Place of birth: Istanbul, Turkey

International career
Years	Team	Apps	(Gls)
- Turkey

İbrahim Yalçınkaya (born 1941) is a Turkish footballer. He competed in the tournament at the 1960 Summer Olympics.
