= Bilge Tarhan (footballer) =

Turkish footballer

Personal information
- Date of birth: 12 February 1941
- Place of birth: Karaman, Turkey
- Date of death: 9 October 2016 (aged 75)
- Position: Forward

International career
Years	Team	Apps	(Gls)
- Turkey

Bilge Tarhan (12 February 1941 – 9 October 2016) was a Turkish footballer. He competed in the men's tournament at the 1960 Summer Olympics.
