= Zeki Şensan =

Turkish footballer (1937–1995)

Personal information
- Date of birth: 1 January 1937
- Place of birth: İzmir, Turkey
- Date of death: 13 February 1995 (aged 58)
- Position: Forward

International career
Years	Team	Apps	(Gls)
- Turkey

Zeki Şensan (1 January 1937 – 13 February 1995) was a Turkish footballer. He competed in the men's tournament at the 1960 Summer Olympics.
