= Tomislav Knez =

Yugoslav footballer

Personal information
- Date of birth: 9 June 1938 (age 88)
- Place of birth: Banja Luka, Kingdom of Yugoslavia
- Position: Striker

Senior career*
Years	Team	Apps	(Gls)
1956–1961	Borac Banja Luka		
1961–1964	Dinamo Zagreb	33	(1)
1964–1966	Schwechat	25	(6)
1966–1967	Rapid Wien	6	(2)
1967–1974	Kapfenberger SV		
1974–1975	SV Güssing		

International career
1960–1961	Yugoslavia	14	(8)

Managerial career
- 1984-1985: Kapfenberger SV
Medal record
Men's Football
Representing Yugoslavia
Olympic Games
Gold medal – first place	1960 Rome	Team
European Championship
Silver medal – second place	1960 France	Team
- * Club domestic league appearances and goals

Tomislav Knez (born 9 June 1938 in Banja Luka) is a retired footballer from Yugoslavia. He was part of the Yugoslav squad that won gold at the 1960 Summer Olympics.

During his club career he played for Borac Banja Luka, Dinamo Zagreb, SV Schwechat, Rapid Wien, Kapfenberger SV and SV Güssing.

He earned 14 caps for the Yugoslavia national football team, and participated in the 1960 European Nations' Cup. His final international was a June 1961 World Cup qualification match against Poland.
