= Zvonko Bego =

Croatian footballer

Personal information
- Full name: Zvonko Bego
- Date of birth: 19 December 1940
- Place of birth: Split, Yugoslavia
- Date of death: 13 August 2018 (aged 77)
- Place of death: Krapinske Toplice, Croatia
- Position: Midfielder

Senior career*
Years	Team	Apps	(Gls)
1957–1967	Hajduk Split	169	(35)
1967	Bayern Munich	0	(0)
1967–1968	FC Twente	6	(1)
1968–1969	Bayer Leverkusen	17	(1)
1969–1971	Austria Salzburg		
1971–1972	Junak Sinj		
1972–1973	Uskok		
Total		182	(37)

International career
1961	Yugoslavia	6	(2)
Medal record
Men's Football
Representing Yugoslavia
Olympic Games
Gold medal – first place	1960 Rome	Team
- * Club domestic league appearances and goals

Zvonko Bego (19 December 1940 – 13 August 2018) was a Yugoslav footballer. He spent most of his career with Croatian side Hajduk Split.

== Club career ==
Bego made his debut for Hajduk in an early 1957 cup match against Lokomotiva and scored 173 goals in 375 games for the club. He moved abroad to play for Bayern Munich, FC Twente, Bayer Leverkusen and Austria Salzburg before returning to Yugoslavia in 1971 and finish his career at Junak Sinj and Uskok Klis.

== International career ==
He made his debut for Yugoslavia in a November 1961 friendly match against Austria and earned a total of 6 caps scoring 2 goals. His final international was a December 1961 friendly against Israel. He was also part of the Yugoslavian side which won gold at the 1960 Summer Olympics, but he did not play in any matches.
