= Andrija Anković =

Croatian footballer and manager (1937–1980)

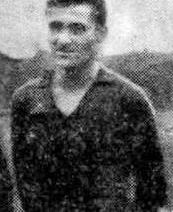

Personal information
- Full name: Andrija Anković
- Date of birth: 16 July 1937
- Place of birth: Gabela, Kingdom of Yugoslavia
- Date of death: 28 April 1980 (aged 42)
- Place of death: Split, SR Croatia, Yugoslavia (now Croatia)
- Height: 1.77 m (5 ft 10 in)
- Positions: Midfielder; forward

Youth career
- –1954: GOŠK Gabela
- 1954–1958: NK Neretva Metković

Senior career*
Years	Team	Apps	(Gls)
1958–1966	Hajduk Split	146	(64)
1966–1968	1. FC Kaiserslautern	21	(4)
1968–1969	SW Bregenz		

International career
1960–1962	Yugoslavia	8	(1)

Managerial career
- 1969–1970: NK Omiš
- 1971–1978: Hajduk Split (football school)
Medal record
Men's Football
Representing Yugoslavia
Olympic Games
Gold medal – first place	1960 Rome	Team
- * Club domestic league appearances and goals

Andrija Anković (16 July 1937 – 28 April 1980) was a Croatian footballer and manager.

== Biography ==
Anković was born in Gabela (at the time Kingdom of Yugoslavia) and started his career with GOŠK Gabela before moving to NK Neretva Metković. He later played for top Croatian side Hajduk Split in the Yugoslavian First League. He played 326 matches and scored 250 goals for Hajduk, becoming one of the club's legends. Finally, he played for German club 1. FC Kaiserslautern. In 1960, Anković was a member of the Yugoslavian team which won gold at the Rome Olympics.

He made his debut for Yugoslavia as a second half substitute in a January 1960 friendly match away against Morocco, scoring their fifth goal in the process, and earned a total of 8 caps scoring 1 goal. His final international was a June 1962 FIFA World Cup match against Colombia.

He died in Split (at the time SFR Yugoslavia) on 28 April 1980, of a heart attack, aged 42. The Andrija Anković Memorial Tournament in Gabela is named after Anković.
