= Football at the 1960 Summer Olympics – Group 2 =

Football at the Summer Olympics group

Group 2 of the 1960 Summer Olympics football tournament took place from 26 August to 1 September 1960. The group consisted of Italy, Great Britain, Brazil and Formosa. The top team, Italy, advanced to the semi-finals.

== Teams ==
| Team | Region | Method of qualification | Date of qualification | Finals appearance | Last appearance | Previous best performance | | | | | | | |
|---|---|---|---|---|---|---|---|---|---|---|---|---|---|
| Team | Region | Method of qualification | Date of qualification | Finals appearance | Last appearance | Previous best performance | Italy | Europe | Hosts | 15 June 1955 | 8th | 1952 | Gold medal (1936) |
| Great Britain | Europe | Europe Group 5 winners | 2 April 1960 | 9th | 1956 | Gold medal (1900, 1908, 1912) | | | | | | | |
| Brazil | Americas | Americas second round third place | 27 April 1960 | 2nd | 1952 | Quarter-finals (1952) | | | | | | | |
| Formosa | Asia | Asia second round winner | 30 April 1960 | 1st | – | – | | | | | | | |

== Standings ==
| Pos | Team | Pld | W | D | L | GF | GA | GD | Pts | Qualification |
|---|---|---|---|---|---|---|---|---|---|---|
| 1 | Italy (H) | 3 | 2 | 1 | 0 | 9 | 4 | +5 | 5 | Advanced to knockout stage |
| 2 | Brazil | 3 | 2 | 0 | 1 | 10 | 6 | +4 | 4 | |
| 3 | Great Britain | 3 | 1 | 1 | 1 | 8 | 8 | 0 | 3 | |
| 4 | Formosa | 3 | 0 | 0 | 3 | 3 | 12 | −9 | 0 | |

Source: RSSSF
(H) Hosts

In the semi-finals, the winners of Group 2, Italy, advanced to play the winner of Group 1, Yugoslavia.

== Matches ==
All times listed are local, CET (UTC+1).

=== Italy vs Formosa ===
26 August 1960
21:00

| Italy | 4–1 | Formosa |
|---|---|---|
| Rivera 10', 33'; Fanello 49'; Tomeazzi 67' | Report | Mok 29' |

Stadio San Paolo, Naples
Referee: Leo Helge (Denmark)

| 1 | Luciano Alfieri |
| 2 | Gilberto Noletti |
| 3 | Mario Trebbi |
| 4 | Giorgio Ferrini |
| 5 | Sandro Salvadore |
| 6 | Giovanni Trapattoni |
| 7 | Gianni Rivera |
| 8 | Giovanni Fanello |
| 9 | Ugo Tomeazzi |
| 10 | Giacomo Bulgarelli |
| 11 | Luciano Magistrelli |
Substitutions:
| | Gian Domenico Baldisserri |
| | Tarcisio Burgnich |
| | Giancarlo Cella |
| | Armando Favalli |
| | Ambrogio Pelagalli |
| | Orazio Rancati |
| | Giorgio Rossano |
| | Paride Tumburus |
Manager:
(Italy) Giuseppe Viani

| 1 | Lau Kin-chung |
| 5 | Kwok Kam-hung |
| 6 | Chan Fai Hung |
| 7 | Law Pak |
| 8 | Lau Tim |
| 9 | Lam Sheung Yee |
| 10 | Kwok Yau |
| 11 | Wong Chi-keung |
| 13 | Chow Shiu-hung |
| 16 | Yiu Cheuk Yin |
| 17 | Mok Chun Wah |
Substitutions:
| | Cheung Chi Doy |
| | Yee Lau |
| | Kwok Tai Lo |
| | Ng Wai Man |
| | Szeto Man |
| | Man Wai Wong |
| | Wai Too Yeung |
| | Yong Poi Dor |
Manager:
(Taiwan) Lee Wai Tong

Assistant referees:
Suhli Garan (Turkey)
Piero Angelini (France)

=== Brazil vs Great Britain ===
26 August 1960
21:00

| Brazil | 4–3 | Great Britain |
|---|---|---|
| Gérson 2'; China 61', 72'; Wanderley 64' | Report | Brown 32', 87'; Lewis 47' |

Stadio di Ardenza, Livorno
Referee: Josef Kandlbinder (West Germany)

| 1 | Carlos Alberto |
| 2 | Nonô |
| 3 | Rubens |
| 4 | Décio |
| 5 | Dary |
| 6 | Wanderley |
| 9 | China |
| 10 | Gérson |
| 11 | Waldir |
| 15 | Roberto Dias |
| 18 | Paulo Ferreira |
Substitutions:
| | Brandão |
| | Maranhão |
| | Edmar |
| | Gil |
| | Jonas |
| | Jurandir |
| | Chiquinho |
Manager:
(Brazil) Vicente Feola

| 1 | Mike Pinner |
| 2 | Tommy Thompson |
| 3 | David Holt |
| 4 | Ron McKinven |
| 5 | Leslie Brown |
| 6 | Roy Sleap |
| 7 | Jim Lewis |
| 8 | Bobby Brown |
| 9 | Paddy Hasty |
| 10 | Hugh Lindsay |
| 11 | John Devine |
Substitutions:
| | Hugh Barr |
| | Laurie Brown |
| | Arnold Coates |
| | Hugh Forde |
| | Michael Greenwood |
| | Terence Howard |
| | Billy Neil |
| | John Wakefield |
Manager:
(England) Norman Creek

Assistant referees:
István Zsolt (Hungary)
Mahmoud Hussein Imam (Egypt)

=== Brazil vs Formosa ===
29 August 1960
16:00

| Brazil | 5–0 | Formosa |
|---|---|---|
| Gérson 13', 16', 47'; Roberto Dias 73', 87' | Report |

Stadio Flaminio, Rome
Referee: Emil Erlich (Yugoslavia)

| 1 | Carlos Alberto |
| 2 | Nonô |
| 6 | Dary |
| 7 | Wanderley |
| 10 | Gérson |
| 11 | Waldir |
| 14 | Jurandir |
| 15 | Roberto Dias |
| 16 | Maranhão |
| 18 | Paulo Ferreira |
| 19 | Chiquinho |
Substitutions:
| | Brandão |
| | China |
| | Décio |
| | Edmar |
| | Gil |
| | Jonas |
| | Rubens |
Manager:
(Brazil) Vicente Feola

| 1 | Lau Kin-chung |
| 2 | Law Pak |
| 3 | Kwok Kam-hung |
| 4 | Chan Fai Hung |
| 5 | Lau Tim |
| 6 | Lam Sheung Yee |
| 7 | Wong Chi-keung |
| 8 | Kwok Yau |
| 9 | Chow Shiu-hung |
| 10 | Yiu Cheuk Yin |
| 11 | Mok Chun Wah |
Substitutions:
| | Cheung Chi Doy |
| | Kwok Tai Lo |
| | Yee Lau |
| | Ng Wai Man |
| | Szeto Man |
| | Man Wai Wong |
| | Wai Too Yeung |
| | Yong Poi Dor |
Manager:
(Taiwan) Lee Wai Tong

Assistant referees:
Mahmoud Hussein Imam (Egypt)
Bahri Ben Saïd (Tunisia)

=== Italy vs Great Britain ===
29 August 1960
21:00

| Italy | 2–2 | Great Britain |
|---|---|---|
| Rossano 11', 55' | Report | Brown 23'; Hasty 75' |

Stadio Flaminio, Rome
Referee: Lucien van Nuffel (Belgium)

| 1 | Luciano Alfieri |
| 3 | Mario Trebbi |
| 5 | Sandro Salvadore |
| 6 | Giovanni Trapattoni |
| 7 | Gianni Rivera |
| 9 | Ugo Tomeazzi |
| 10 | Giacomo Bulgarelli |
| 13 | Tarcisio Burgnich |
| 15 | Paride Tumburus |
| 18 | Giorgio Rossano |
| 19 | Giancarlo Cella |
Substitutions:
| | Gian Domenico Baldisserri |
| | Giovanni Fanello |
| | Armando Favalli |
| | Giorgio Ferrini |
| | Luciano Magistrelli |
| | Gilberto Noletti |
| | Ambrogio Pelagalli |
| | Orazio Rancati |
Manager:
(Italy) Giuseppe Viani

| 1 | Mike Pinner |
| 2 | Billy Neil |
| 3 | David Holt |
| 4 | Ron McKinven |
| 5 | Leslie Brown |
| 6 | Roy Sleap |
| 7 | Jim Lewis |
| 8 | Bobby Brown |
| 9 | Paddy Hasty |
| 10 | Hugh Lindsay |
| 11 | John Devine |
Substitutions:
| | Hugh Barr |
| | Laurie Brown |
| | Arnold Coates |
| | Hugh Forde |
| | Michael Greenwood |
| | Terence Howard |
| | Tommy Thompson |
| | John Wakefield |
Manager:
(England) Norman Creek

Assistant referees:
Suhli Garan (Turkey)
Bahri Ben Saïd (Tunisia)

=== Italy vs Brazil ===
1 September 1960
21:00

| Italy | 3–1 | Brazil |
|---|---|---|
| Rivera 69'; Rossano 70', 86' | Report | Waldir 4' |

Stadio Comunale, Florence
Referee: Pierre Schwinte (France)

1 | Luciano Alfieri
3 | Mario Trebbi
4 | Giorgio Ferrini
5 | Sandro Salvadore
6 | Giovanni Trapattoni
7 | Gianni Rivera
8 | Giovanni Fanello
13 | Tarcisio Burgnich
15 | Paride Tumburus | Booked
16 | Orazio Rancati
18 | Giorgio Rossano
Substitutions:
Gian Domenico Baldisserri
Giacomo Bulgarelli
Giancarlo Cella
Armando Favalli
Luciano Magistrelli
Gilberto Noletti
Ambrogio Pelagalli
Ugo Tomeazzi
Manager:
(Italy) Giuseppe Viani

| 1 | Carlos Alberto |
| 2 | Nonô |
| 3 | Rubens |
| 4 | Décio |
| 5 | Roberto Dias |
| 6 | Dary |
| 7 | Wanderley |
| 8 | Paulo Ferreira |
| 9 | China |
| 10 | Gérson |
| 11 | Waldir |
Substitutions:
| | Brandão |
| | Chiquinho |
| | Maranhão |
| | Edmar |
| | Gil |
| | Jonas |
| | Jurandir |
Manager:
(Brazil) Vicente Feola

Assistant referees:
Raymond Morgan (Canada)
Leo Helge (Denmark)

=== Great Britain vs Formosa ===
1 September 1960
21:00

| Great Britain | 3–2 | Formosa |
|---|---|---|
| Lewis 35'; Brown 58'; Hasty 85' | Report | Yiu 70', 88' |

Stadio Olimpico Comunale, Grosseto
Referee: Josef Kandlbinder (West Germany)

| 1 | Mike Pinner |
| 2 | Michael Greenwood |
| 3 | David Holt |
| 4 | Ron McKinven |
| 5 | Leslie Brown |
| 6 | Hugh Forde |
| 7 | Jim Lewis |
| 8 | Bobby Brown |
| 9 | Paddy Hasty |
| 10 | Hugh Lindsay |
| 11 | Terence Howard |
Substitutions:
| | Hugh Barr |
| | Laurie Brown |
| | Arnold Coates |
| | John Devine |
| | Billy Neil |
| | Roy Sleap |
| | Tommy Thompson |
| | John Wakefield |
Manager:
(England) Norman Creek

| 1 | Lau Kin-chung |
| 2 | Law Pak |
| 3 | Kwok Yau |
| 4 | Chan Fai Hung |
| 5 | Lau Tim |
| 6 | Man Wai Wong |
| 7 | Wong Chi-keung |
| 8 | Lam Sheung Yee |
| 9 | Chow Shiu-hung |
| 10 | Yiu Cheuk Yin |
| 11 | Mok Chun Wah |
Substitutions:
| | Cheung Chi Doy |
| | Kwok Kam-hung |
| | Yee Lau |
| | Kwok Tai Lo |
| | Ng Wai Man |
| | Szeto Man |
| | Wai Too Yeung |
| | Yong Poi Dor |
Manager:
(Taiwan) Lee Wai Tong

Assistant referees:
E. Elrich
Bahri Ben Saïd (Netherlands Antilles)

== See also ==
- Italy at the Olympics
- Great Britain at the Olympics
- Brazil at the Olympics
- Chinese Taipei at the Olympics
