= Football at the 1958 Asian Games – Men's team squads =

Squads for the Football at the 1958 Asian Games played in Tokyo, Japan.

== Group A ==
=== Taiwan ===
Head coach: (China) Lee Wai Tong

No.	Pos.	Player	Date of birth (age)	Caps	Goals	Club
	GK	Lau Kin-chung (劉建中)				
	DF	Law Pak (羅北)				
	DF	Kwok Kam-hung (郭錦洪)				
	MF	Chan Fai-hung (陳輝洪)				
	MF	Lau Yee (劉儀)				
	MF	Lam Sheung Yee (林尚義)				
	MF	Tang Sum (鄧森)				
	FW	Wong Chi Keung (黃志強)				
	FW	Lo Kwok Tai (羅國泰)				
	FW	Kwok Yu (郭有)				
	FW	Yiu Chuk Yin (姚卓然)				
	FW	Mok Chun Wa (莫振華)				
	FW	Ho Ying Fun (何應芬)				
	FW	Lau Tim (劉添)				
	FW	Chow Shiu-hung (周少雄)				
	GK	Kwok Chiu-ming (郭秋明)				
	DF	Lee Kwok Wah (李國華)				
	MF	Ho Chi-kwan (何志坤)				
	FW	Yang Wai Tou(楊偉韜)				
	FW	Kwok Moon-wah(郭滿華)				
	FW	Lau Sui-wah(劉瑞華)				

=== South Vietnam ===
Head coach: (South Vietnam)

No.	Pos.	Player	Date of birth (age)	Caps	Goals	Club
	GK	Phạm Văn Rạng				
	DF	Trần Văn Nhung				
	DF	Duang Văn Quai				
	MF	Nguyễn Ngọc Thanh				
	DF	Phạm Văn Hiếu				
	MF	Lê Văn Hồ				
	FW	Lại Văn Ngôn				
	FW	Đỗ Thới Vinh				
	FW	Nguyễn Văn Cụt				
	FW	Đỗ Quang Thách				
	FW	Nguyễn Văn Tư				

=== Pakistan ===
Head coach: (Scotland) John McBride

No.	Pos.	Player	Date of birth (age)	Caps	Goals	Club
	GK	Manzur Hasan Mintu	7 April 1940 (aged 18)			(Pakistan Football Federation) Kamal Sporting
	GK	Muhammad Siddiq	1933 (aged 25)			(Pakistan Football Federation) Balochistan
	DF	Abdul Haq (Vice-captain)				(Pakistan Football Federation) Punjab
	DF	Nabi Chowdhury (Captain)	1934 (aged 24)			(Pakistan Football Federation) PWD SC
	DF	Amir Jang Ghaznavi	17 June 1933 (aged 24)			(Pakistan Football Federation) Dhaka Mohammedan
	DF	Riasat Ali				(Pakistan Football Federation) Punjab
	MF	Abid Hussain Ghazi	1934 (aged 24)			(Pakistan Football Federation) Victoria SC
	MF	Masood ul Hassan Butt	1933 (aged 25)			(Pakistan Football Federation) Punjab
	MF	Hussain Killer				
	FW	Muhammad Hanif				(Pakistan Football Federation) Punjab
	FW	Mari Chowdhury	29 October 1938 (aged 19)			(Pakistan Football Federation) Dhaka Mohammedan
	FW	Ashraf Chowdhury	1935 (aged 23)			(Pakistan Football Federation) Dhaka Mohammedan
	FW	Kabir Ahmed	2 February 1935 (aged 23)			(Pakistan Football Federation) Dhaka Mohammedan
	FW	Muhammad Umer	1935 (aged 23)			(All India Football Federation) Kolkata Mohammedan
	FW	Ghulam Rabbani	31 December 1936 (aged 21)			(Pakistan Football Federation) Punjab
	FW	Talib Ali	1940 (aged 18)			(Pakistan Football Federation) Punjab
	FW	Ibrahim				(Pakistan Football Federation) Karachi Port Trust
		Shaukat Muhammad				

=== Malaya ===
Head coach: (Federation of Malaya)

No.	Pos.	Player	Date of birth (age)	Caps	Goals	Club
1	GK					
2	DF					
3	DF					
4	MF					
5	DF					
6	MF					
7	FW	Abdul Ghani Minhat	23 December 1935 (aged 22)			(Football Association of Malaysia) Selangor FA
8	FW					
9	FW					
10	FW					
11	FW					
12						
13						
14						
15						
16						
17						
18						

== Group B ==
=== Indonesia ===
Head coach: (Socialist Federal Republic of Yugoslavia) Antun Pogačnik

No.	Pos.	Player	Date of birth (age)	Caps	Goals	Club
1	GK	Maulwi Saelan	8 August 1928 (aged 29)			(Football Association of Indonesia) PSM Makassar
2	DF	Fattah Hidayat				(Football Association of Indonesia) Persib Bandung
3	DF	Muhammad Ilyas				(Football Association of Indonesia) Persija Jakarta
4	DF	Mohamed Rashjid				(Football Association of Indonesia) PSMS Medan
5	DF	Kwee Kiat Sek	11 January 1934 (aged 24)			(Football Association of Indonesia) Persib Bandung
6	DF	Mardjoso				
7	MF	Kurnia				(Football Association of Indonesia) PSM Makassar
8	MF	Thio Him Tjiang	28 August 1929 (aged 29)			(Football Association of Indonesia) Persija Jakarta
9	MF	Phwa Sian Liong	26 January 1931 (aged 27)			(Football Association of Indonesia) Persebaya Surabaya
10	MF	Tan Liong Houw	26 July 1930 (aged 27)			(Football Association of Indonesia) Persija Jakarta
11	MF	Rukma Sudjana	27 August 1935 (aged 22)			(Football Association of Indonesia) Persib Bandung
12	GK	Paidjo	27 February 1935 (aged 23)			(Football Association of Indonesia) Persija Jakarta
13	FW	Ramang	24 April 1928 (aged 30)			(Football Association of Indonesia) PSM Makassar
14	FW	Saari				(Football Association of Indonesia) PSMS Medan
15	FW	Bakir				(Football Association of Indonesia) PSMS Medan
16	FW	Wowo Sunaryo	16 March 1934 (aged 24)			(Football Association of Indonesia) Persib Bandung
17	FW	Omo Suratmo	11 February 1935 (aged 23)			(Football Association of Indonesia) Persib Bandung
18	FW	Suryadi				(Football Association of Indonesia) Persema Malang
19	FW	Hengki Timisela	22 November 1937 (aged 20)			(Football Association of Indonesia) Persib Bandung

=== India ===
Head coach: (India) T. Shome

No.	Pos.	Player	Date of birth (age)	Caps	Goals	Club
	GK	Peter Thangaraj	24 December 1935 (aged 22)			(All India Football Federation) Madras Regimental Centre
	GK	S. S. Narayan	12 November 1934 (aged 23)			(All India Football Federation) Caltex Bombay
	DF	Mohammad Abdul Salaam				(All India Football Federation) Bengal
	DF	Syed Khwaja Azizuddin (c)	12 July 1930 (aged 27)			(All India Football Federation) Hyderabad City Police
	DF	Abdul Latif	15 August 1928 (aged 29)			(All India Football Federation) Mohammedan Sporting
	DF	Ahmed Hussain				(All India Football Federation) Bengal
	MF	Mariappa Kempiah	4 March 1932 (aged 26)			(All India Football Federation) Mohun Bagan
	MF	Muhammad Noor				(All India Football Federation) Hyderabad City Police
	MF	Nikhil Nandy				(All India Football Federation) Eastern Railway
	MF	Bir Bahadur Gurung				(All India Football Federation) East Bengal
	FW	K. T. Pavitran				(All India Football Federation) Bombay
	FW	Pradip Kumar Banerjee	23 June 1936 (aged 21)			(All India Football Federation) Bengal
	FW	Chuni Goswami	15 January 1938 (aged 20)			(All India Football Federation) Mohun Bagan
	FW	M. Rahmatullah				(All India Football Federation) Bengal
	FW	D. Damodaram				(All India Football Federation) Bengal
	FW	Dharmalingam Kannan	8 July 1936 (aged 21)			(All India Football Federation) Hyderabad
	FW	Tulsidas Balaram	4 October 1936 (aged 21)			(All India Football Federation) East Bengal

=== Burma ===
Head coach: (Socialist Federal Republic of Yugoslavia) Milorad Mitrović

No.	Pos.	Player	Date of birth (age)	Caps	Goals	Club
1	GK					
2	DF					
3	DF					
4	MF					
5	DF					
6	MF					
7	FW					
8	FW					
9	FW					
10	FW					
11	FW					
12						
13						
14						
15						
16						
17						
18						

== Group C ==
=== Hong Kong ===
Head coach: (Hong Kong) Lai Shiu Wing

No.	Pos.	Player	Date of birth (age)	Caps	Goals	Club
	GK	Cheung Jim Mei				
	DF	Lau Tze On				
	DF	Szeto Yiu				
	MF	Chan Chi Kong				
	DF	Lee Bing Chiu				
	MF	Wong Kwok Ki				
	FW	Chu Wing Wah				
	FW	Lau Chi Lam				
	FW	Lee Yuk Tak				
	FW	Ho Cheung Yau				
	FW	Lam Ka Tong				
		Wai Fat Kim				
		Lau Chi Bing				
		Liu Shu Ping				
		Wong Chi Kwong				
		Luk Tat Hay				
		Ko Po Keung				
		Leung Kit				
		Lau Kai Chiu				
		Au Chi Yin				
		Leung Wai Hung				
		Choi King Sang				

Hong Kong national team and Republic of China national team shared same fodder of players during pre-1971. Most, if not all, of the players playing in the Hong Kong football league. The ROC team practically the A-team, while Hong Kong practically the B-team, with lesser quality of players.

=== Philippines ===
Head coach: (Philippines) Ramon Echevarria Sr.

No.	Pos.	Player	Date of birth (age)	Caps	Goals	Club
	GK	Vic Sison	December 1936 (aged 22)			
	GK	Francisco Pacla				
	DF	Ed Ocampo				
	DF	Manolo Rabat				
		Roberto Da Silva				
		Ramon Melendez				
	MF	Fidel Peñaranda				
	MF	Ricardo Marmoleño				
	MF	Julio Umadhay				
	MF	Roberto Bravo				
	FW	Lino Castillejo				
	FW	Orlando Plagata				
	FW	Angelo Dauden				
	FW	George Aldeguer				
	FW	Eduardo Pacheco	4 January 1936 (aged 18)			
	FW	Jose Villareal				
	FW	Alberto Villareal				
	FW	Pepe Teh				

=== Japan ===
Head coach: (Japan) Taizo Kawamoto

No.	Pos.	Player	Date of birth (age)	Caps	Goals	Club
	GK	Yoshio Furukawa				
	GK	Sachio Shimomura				
	GK	Yutaka Kamo				
	DF	Ryuzo Hiraki				
	DF	Yasuo Takamori				
	DF	Michihiro Ozawa				
	DF	Yozo Aoki				
	MF	Hiroaki Sato				
	MF	Waichiro Omura				
	MF	Hideo Kitajima				
	MF	Takashi Takabayashi				
	MF	Shigeo Yaegashi				
	MF	Kenzo Ohashi				
	FW	Akira Kitaguchi				
	FW	Masao Uchino				
	FW	Isao Iwabuchi				
	FW	Yoshinori Shigematsu				
	FW	Ken Naganuma				
	FW	Atsuhiro Mimino				
	FW	Hideyuki Kurita				
	FW	Koji Sasaki				
	FW	Hiroshi Ninomiya				

== Group D ==
=== South Korea ===
Head coach: (South Korea) Kim Keun-chan

No.	Pos.	Player	Date of birth (age)	Caps	Goals	Club
	GK	Ham Heung-chul	17 November 1930 (aged 27)			(Korea Football Association) ROK Army Office of the Provost Marshal General FC
	GK	Kim Sang-jin	26 October 1930 (aged 27)			(Korea Football Association) ROK Army CIC FC
	DF	Kim Hong-bok	4 March 1935 (aged 23)			(Korea Football Association) ROK Army Quartermaster Corps FC
	DF	Sim Keon-taek	10 May 1934 (aged 24)			(Korea Football Association) ROK Marine Corps FC
	DF	Cha Tae-sung	8 October 1934 (aged 23)			(Korea Football Association) ROK Army CIC FC
	MF	Kim Ji-sung	7 November 1924 (aged 33)			(Korea Football Association) ROK Army CIC FC
	MF	Kim Chan-ki	30 December 1932 (aged 25)			(Korea Football Association) ROK Army Office of the Provost Marshal General FC
	MF	Kim Jin-woo				(Korea Football Association) ROK Army CIC FC
	MF	Kim Young-il				(Korea Football Association) ROK Army Office of the Provost Marshal General FC
	FW	Kim Dong-keun	14 April 1927 (aged 31)			(Korea Football Association) ROK Marine Corps FC
	FW	Choi Kwang-seok	27 March 1932 (aged 26)			(Korea Football Association) ROK Marine Corps FC
	FW	Lee Soo-nam	2 February 1927 (aged 31)			(Korea Football Association) ROK Army CIC FC
	FW	Sung Nak-woon	2 February 1926 (aged 32)			(Korea Football Association) ROK Army Quartermaster Corps FC
	FW	Park Kyung-ho	20 May 1930 (aged 28)			(Korea Football Association) ROK Army CIC FC
	FW	Choi Chung-min	27 July 1927 (aged 30)			(Korea Football Association) ROK Army CIC FC
	FW	Kim Young-jin				(Korea Football Association) ROK Army Quartermaster Corps FC
	FW	Woo Sang-kwon	2 February 1928 (aged 30)			(Korea Football Association) ROK Army Office of the Provost Marshal General FC
	FW	Moon Jung-sik	2 February 1928 (aged 30)			(Korea Football Association) ROK Army CIC FC

=== Israel ===
Head coach: (Israel) Moshe Varon

No.	Pos.	Player	Date of birth (age)	Caps	Goals	Club
	GK	Avraham Bendori				Maccabi Tel Aviv
	GK	Yaacov Hodorov				Hapoel Tel Aviv
		Shaul Matania				Maccabi Tel Aviv
		Moshe Haldi				
		Gideon Tish				Hapoel Tel Aviv
		Hanoch Mordechovich				
		Nahum Stelmach				Hapoel Petah Tikva
		Noah Reznik				Maccabi Tel Aviv
		Yosef Goldstein				Maccabi Tel Aviv
		Itzhak Nahmias				
		Yehoshua Glazer				Maccabi Tel Aviv
		Shlomo Nahari				
		Amatsia Levkovich				Hapoel Tel Aviv
		Yosef Goldstein				
		Rafi Levi				Maccabi Tel Aviv
		Boaz Kofman				Hapoel Petah Tikva

=== Singapore ===
Head coach: (Singapore)

No.	Pos.	Player	Date of birth (age)	Caps	Goals	Club
	GK	S.S. Chon				
	DF	Hashim Aman Kastawi				
	DF	M. Sudasee				
	MF	O.K. Beng				
	DF	Low Kee Seng				
	MF	I.O. Johan				
	FW	I. Hussan				
	FW	Arthur Koh				
	FW	S. Hussein				
	FW	Q.K. Siew				
	FW	D. Zaniel				

=== Iran ===
Head coach: (Hungary) József Mészáros

No.	Pos.	Player	Date of birth (age)	Caps	Goals	Club
	GK	Ali Jafarzadeh				(Football Federation Islamic Republic of Iran) Shahin F.C.
	DF	Aref Gholizadeh				(Football Federation Islamic Republic of Iran) Taj
	DF	Davoud Arghavani				(Football Federation Islamic Republic of Iran) Taj
	MF	Amir Eraghi				(Football Federation Islamic Republic of Iran) Shahin F.C.
	DF	Javad Beheshti				(Football Federation Islamic Republic of Iran) Shahin F.C.
	MF	Parviz Dehdari				(Football Federation Islamic Republic of Iran) Jam F.C.
	FW	Bivak Jedikar				(Football Federation Islamic Republic of Iran) Taj
	FW	Masoud Boroumand				(Football Federation Islamic Republic of Iran) Shahin F.C.
	FW	Nader Afshar Alavinejad				(Football Federation Islamic Republic of Iran) Taj
	FW	Parviz Koozehkanani				(German Football Association) Bayer Leverkusen
	FW	Mahmoud Bayati				(Football Federation Islamic Republic of Iran) Taj
		Iraj Erfan				(Football Federation Islamic Republic of Iran) Shahin F.C.
	MF	Iraj Hatem				(Football Federation Islamic Republic of Iran) Taj
