= 1960 AFC Asian Cup squads =

Squads for the 1960 AFC Asian Cup played in South Korea.

== South Korea ==
Head coach: Kim Yong-sik

No.	Pos.	Player	Date of birth (age)	Caps	Goals	Club
	GK	Ham Heung-chul	17 November 1930 (aged 29)			(Korea Football Association) ROK Army OPMG
	GK	Park Sang-hoon	1931			(Korea Football Association) ROK Marine Corps
	DF	Cha Tae-sung	8 October 1934 (aged 26)			(Korea Football Association) ROK Army CIC
	DF	Kim Hong-bok	4 March 1935 (aged 25)			(Korea Football Association) ROK Army OPMG
	DF	Lee Eun-sung	14 October 1937 (aged 23)			(Korea Football Association) Yonsei University
	MF	Kim Chan-ki	30 December 1932 (aged 27)			(Korea Football Association) ROK Army OPMG
	MF	Kim Seon-hui				(Korea Football Association) Korea University
	MF	Son Myung-sub				(Korea Football Association) ROK Army CIC
	FW	Yoo Gwang-joon	7 March 1932 (aged 28)			(Korea Football Association) ROK Army Quartermaster Corps
	FW	Chung Soon-chun	15 January 1940 (aged 20)			(Korea Football Association) ROK Army CIC
	FW	Moon Jung-sik	23 June 1930 (aged 30)			(Korea Football Association) ROK Army CIC
	FW	Choi Chung-min	17 November 1930 (aged 29)			(Korea Football Association) ROK Army CIC
	FW	Lee Soon-myung	23 June 1939 (aged 21)			(Korea Football Association) ROK Army CIC
	FW	Cho Yoon-ok	25 February 1940 (aged 20)			(Korea Football Association) ROK Army CIC
	FW	Woo Sang-kwon	2 February 1928 (aged 32)			(Korea Football Association) ROK Army OPMG
	FW	Yoo Pan-son				(Korea Football Association) Kyung Hee University
	FW	Park Kyung-hwa	2 June 1939 (aged 21)			(Korea Football Association) Yonsei University
	FW	Um Kyung-Jin				(Korea Football Association) Korea University

== Israel ==
Head coach: (Hungary) Gyula Mándi

No.	Pos.	Player	Date of birth (age)	Caps	Goals	Club
	GK	Ya'akov Hodorov	16 June 1927 (aged 33)	23	0	(Israel Football Association) Hapoel Tel Aviv
	GK	Ya'akov Vissoker	5 September 1930 (aged 30)	2	0	(Israel Football Association) Hapoel Petah Tikva
	DF	Amatzia Levkovich	27 December 1937 (aged 22)	14	0	(Israel Football Association) Hapoel Tel Aviv
	DF	Dov Atzmon	23 October 1941 (aged 18)	0	0	(Israel Football Association) Hapoel Jerusalem
	DF	Mordechai Benbinisti	1 March 1938 (aged 22)	3	0	(Israel Football Association) Hapoel Jerusalem
	DF	Zvi Moisescu	13 August 1939 (aged 21)	3	0	(Israel Football Association) Maccabi Netanya
	MF	Avraham Kalmi	6 December 1939 (aged 20)	0	0	(Israel Football Association) Maccabi Jaffa
	MF	Avraham Menchel	12 December 1935 (aged 24)	13	4	(Israel Football Association) Maccabi Haifa
	MF	Gideon Tish	13 October 1939 (aged 21)	16	0	(Israel Football Association) Hapoel Tel Aviv
	MF	Yosef Goldstein	29 March 1932 (aged 28)	20	1	(Israel Football Association) Maccabi Tel Aviv
	FW	Aharon Amar	1 January 1937 (aged 23)	8	0	(Israel Football Association) Maccabi Haifa
	FW	Amnon Aharonskind	25 March 1940 (aged 20)	0	0	(Israel Football Association) Maccabi Tel Aviv
	FW	Nahum Stelmach	19 July 1936 (aged 24)	23	13	(Israel Football Association) Hapoel Petah Tikva
	FW	Rafi Levi	22 February 1938 (aged 22)	14	10	(Israel Football Association) Maccabi Tel Aviv
	FW	Shlomo Levi	1 June 1934 (aged 26)	0	0	(Israel Football Association) Hapoel Haifa
	FW	Shlomo Nahari	17 October 1934 (aged 25)	8	1	(Israel Football Association) Hapoel Petah Tikva
	FW	Yehoshua Glazer	29 December 1927 (aged 32)	32	15	(Israel Football Association) Maccabi Tel Aviv

== South Vietnam ==
Head coach: Lê Hữu Đức

No.	Pos.	Player	Date of birth (age)	Caps	Goals	Club
	GK	Phạm Văn Rạng	8 January 1934 (aged 26)			(Vietnam Football Federation) Quan Thuế
	GK	Trần Văn Đực	1939 (aged 20-21)			(Vietnam Football Federation) Tổng Tham Mưu
	DF	Lê Văn Tý				(Vietnam Football Federation) Tổng Tham Mưu
	DF	Nguyễn Văn Cụt				(Vietnam Football Federation) Cảnh Sát
	DF	Phạm Trí Sáng				(Vietnam Football Federation) Gia Định
	MF	Phạm Văn Hiếu	1921 (aged 38 - 39)			(Vietnam Football Federation) AJS
	MF	Phạm Huỳnh Tam Lang	14 February 1942 (age 18)			(Vietnam Football Federation) Ngôi Sao Chợ Lớn
	MF	Lâm Văn Bon				(Vietnam Football Federation) Cảnh Sát
	MF	Nguyễn Ngọc Thanh	28 March 1938 (aged 22)			(Vietnam Football Federation) Tổng Tham Mưu
	MF	Huỳnh Niệm Văn				(Vietnam Football Federation) Tổng Tham Mưu
	FW	Nguyễn Văn Quang	1941 (aged 18-19)			(Vietnam Football Federation) Thương Khẩu
	FW	Nguyễn Văn Lữ				(Vietnam Football Federation) Tổng Tham Mưu
	FW	Đỗ Thới Vinh	6 June 1940 (aged 22)			(Vietnam Football Federation) Quân Cụ
	FW	Đỗ Quang Thách	15 January 1928 (age 32)			(Vietnam Football Federation) AJS
	FW	Lý Văn Rỏn				(Vietnam Football Federation) Tổng Tham Mưu
	FW	Trần Văn Nhung	1933 (aged 26 - 27)			(Vietnam Football Federation) AJS
	FW	Trịnh Ngầu	1937 (aged 22-23)			(Vietnam Football Federation) Tổng Tham Mưu
	FW	Nguyễn Văn Tư				(Vietnam Football Federation) AJS

== Republic of China ==
Head coach: Lee Wai Tong (李惠堂) and Chu Kuo-Lun

No.	Pos.	Player	Date of birth (age)	Caps	Goals	Club
	GK	Lui Woon Suen (雷煥璇)				(Hong Kong) Eastern
	GK	Wung Pui Xo (翁培佐)				(Hong Kong) Tung Wah
	DF	Law Pak (羅北)	25 May 1933 (aged 27)			(Hong Kong) Tung Wah
	DF	Lee Kwok Wah (李國華)				(Hong Kong) Tung Wah
	MF	Chan Fai Hung (陳輝洪)	5 May 1932 (aged 28)			(Hong Kong) Tung Wah
	MF	Kwok Yu (郭有)	24 October 1927 (aged 32)			(Hong Kong) South China
	MF	Ng Wai Man (吳偉文)	3 November 1932 (aged 27)			(Hong Kong) Tung Wah
	MF	Lau Tim (劉添)	1 January 1934 (aged 26)			
	MF	Zou Wenzhi (鄒文治)				
	FW	Wong Chi Keung (黃志強)				(Hong Kong) South China
	FW	Yiu Cheuk Yin (姚卓然)	3 July 1928 (aged 32)			(Hong Kong) Tung Wah
	FW	Lo Kwok Tai (羅國泰)	25 August 1929 (aged 31)			(Hong Kong) Tung Wah
	FW	Szeto Man (司徒文)	16 December 1930 (aged 29)			(Hong Kong) Eastern
	FW	Yang Wai Tou (楊偉韜)				(Hong Kong) Sing Tao
	FW	Lau Woon Vheng (劉煥清)				(Hong Kong) Sing Tao
	FW	Ho Ying Fun (何應芬)	1920			(Hong Kong) Eastern
	FW	Luk Man Wai (陸文渭)				(Hong Kong) Kowloon Motor Bus FC
