= Football at the 1966 Asian Games – Men's team squads =

Squads for the Football at the 1966 Asian Games played in Bangkok, Thailand.

== Group A ==
=== Burma ===
Head coach: (Soviet Union) German Zonin

No.	Pos.	Player	Date of birth (age)	Caps	Goals	Club
1	GK	Tin Aung				
2		Maung Than Win				
5		Maung Tin Han				
3		Kyaw Thaung				
12		Soe Myint				
7		Maung Aye Maung				
6	FW	Suk Bahadur Thapa				
8		Maung Hla Htay				
9		Han Thien				
10		Hla Kyi				
11		Pu Ba				
		Hla Pe				
		Hla Shwe Kay				
		Khin Maung Lay				
	MF	Maung Maung				
		Ohn Pe				
		Than Lwin				
		Thein Aung				
		Tin Aye				
		Win Kyi				

=== South Korea ===
Head coach: (South Korea) An Jong-soo

No.	Pos.	Player	Date of birth (age)	Caps	Goals	Club
14	GK	Lee Joon-ok	26 September 1939 (aged 27)			(Korea Football Association) Cheil Industries FC
12	GK	Lee Se-yeon	11 July 1945 (aged 21)			(Korea Football Association) Kyung Hee University
7	DF	Baek Young-keun	15 April 1943 (aged 23)			(Korea Football Association) ROK Army Quartermaster Corps FC
4	DF	Park Kwang-jo	22 January 1944 (aged 22)			(Korea Football Association) Chung-Ang University
9	DF	Seok Hyo-kil	28 April 1943 (aged 23)			(Korea Football Association) Keumsung Textile Company FC
17	DF	Cho Jung-soo	20 August 1944 (aged 22)			(Korea Football Association) Keumsung Textile Company FC
8	DF	Seo Yoon-chan	6 December 1944 (aged 22)			(Korea Football Association) Cheil Industries FC
	DF	Hwang Ho	22 April 1942 (aged 24)			(Korea Football Association) Kyung Hee University
2	MF	Kim Sung-chul	23 August 1943 (aged 23)			(Korea Football Association) ROK Marine Corps FC
10	MF	An Won-nam	5 December 1943 (aged 23)			(Korea Football Association) Cheil Industries FC
1	MF	Kim Ki-bok	20 May 1944 (aged 22)			(Korea Football Association) Chung-Ang University
5	MF	Park Soo-il	25 April 1944 (aged 22)			(Korea Football Association) Keumsung Textile Company FC
3	MF	Kim Chang-il	16 August 1945 (aged 21)			(Korea Football Association) Korea Tungsten Company FC
16	MF	Lim Kook-chan	15 February 1940 (aged 26)			(Korea Football Association) Kyung Hee University
6	FW	Bae Keum-soo	26 November 1943 (aged 23)			(Korea Football Association) Kyung Hee University
15	FW	Lee Hoe-taik	11 October 1946 (aged 20)			(Korea Football Association) Korea Coal Corporation FC
	FW	Chung An-woong	19 October 1943 (aged 23)			(Korea Football Association) Keumsung Textile Company FC
	FW	Jeong Kang-ji	5 October 1943 (aged 23)			(Korea Football Association) Korea University
18	FW	Joo Min-hwan	23 November 1942 (aged 24)			(Korea Football Association) Yonsei University
11	FW	Lee Wan-seok	4 July 1938 (aged 28)			(Korea Football Association) Korea Coal Corporation FC
13	FW	Lee Yi-woo	18 February 1941 (aged 25)			(Korea Football Association) ROK Marine Corps FC

=== Thailand ===
Head coach: (Thailand)

No.	Pos.	Player	Date of birth (age)	Caps	Goals	Club
1	GK	Saravut Pathipakornchai				
9		Chuchart Thanormchai				
4		Yongyouth Cankhagowit				
8		Ananta Hongchareon				
12		Chalerm Jones				
3		Suphot Panich				
13		Udomsilp Sonbutnag				
14		Asdang Panikabuir				
15		Yanyong Na-Nongkai				
18		Vichit Yamboonruang				
20		Vanakit Prasan Danchareon				

== Group B ==
=== India ===
Head coach: (India) Mohammed Hussain

No.	Pos.	Player	Date of birth (age)	Caps	Goals	Club
	GK	Peter Thangaraj	24 December 1935 (aged 30)			(All India Football Federation) East Bengal
	GK	C Mustafa				(All India Football Federation) Mohammedan Sporting
	DF	Jarnail Singh (c)	20 February 1936 (aged 30)			(All India Football Federation) Mohun Bagan
	DF	Chandreswar Prasad				(All India Football Federation) Bengal
	DF	Syed Nayeemuddin				(All India Football Federation) Bengal
	DF	Arun Ghosh	7 July 1941 (aged 25)			(All India Football Federation) Bengal
	DF	Altaf Ahmed				(All India Football Federation) East Bengal
	MF	Kajal Mukherjee				(All India Football Federation) Bengal
	MF	Yousuf Khan	5 August 1937 (aged 29)			(All India Football Federation) Andhra Pradesh
	MF	Prasanta Sinha				(All India Football Federation) Bengal
	MF	Krisnaji Rao				(All India Football Federation) Mysore
	FW	Ashok Chatterjee				(All India Football Federation) Bengal
	FW	Pradip Kumar Banerjee	23 June 1936 (aged 30)			(All India Football Federation) Railways
	FW	Inder Singh	23 December 1943 (aged 22)			(All India Football Federation) Leaders Club
	FW	Arumai Nayagam				(All India Football Federation) Mohun Bagan
	FW	Parimal Dey	4 May 1941 (aged 25)			(All India Football Federation) East Bengal
	FW	P. Kannan				(All India Football Federation) Bengal

=== Iran ===
Head coach: (Hungary) György Szűcs

No.	Pos.	Player	Date of birth (age)	Caps	Goals	Club
1	GK	Aziz Asli				(Football Federation Islamic Republic of Iran) Shahin F.C.
5		Hamid Jasemian				(Football Federation Islamic Republic of Iran) Shahin F.C.
4		Hassan Habibi				(Football Federation Islamic Republic of Iran) PAS Tehran F.C.
18		Parviz Mirzahassan				(Football Federation Islamic Republic of Iran) PAS Tehran F.C.
6		Goudarz Habibi				(Football Federation Islamic Republic of Iran) Shoa F.C.
17	FW	Homayoun Behzadi				(Football Federation Islamic Republic of Iran) Shahin F.C.
12		Hamid Aminikhah				(Football Federation Islamic Republic of Iran) Daraei F.C.
11		Ali Jabbari				(Football Federation Islamic Republic of Iran) Taj SC
15		Fariborz Esmaeili				(Football Federation Islamic Republic of Iran) Taj SC
8	FW	Jalal Talebi				(Football Federation Islamic Republic of Iran) Daraei F.C.
13	FW	Akbar Eftekhari				(Football Federation Islamic Republic of Iran) Daraei F.C.
9		Mostafa Arab				(Football Federation Islamic Republic of Iran) Oghab Tehran F.C.
10		Gholam Hossein Farzami				(Football Federation Islamic Republic of Iran) Taj SC
3		Parviz Ghelichkhani				(Football Federation Islamic Republic of Iran) Kian F.C.
7		Mohammad Ranjbar				(Football Federation Islamic Republic of Iran) PAS Tehran F.C.
14		Abdollah Saedi				(Football Federation Islamic Republic of Iran) Daraei F.C.
		Mehrab Shahrokhi				(Football Federation Islamic Republic of Iran) Shahin F.C.
16		Hamid Shirzadegan				(Football Federation Islamic Republic of Iran) Shahin F.C.
2		Faramarz Zelli				(Football Federation Islamic Republic of Iran) PAS Tehran F.C.

=== Japan ===
Head coach: (Japan) Ken Naganuma

No.	Pos.	Player	Date of birth (age)	Caps	Goals	Club
	GK	Masahiro Hamazaki				(Japan Football Association) Nippon Steel
	GK	Kenzo Yokoyama				(Japan Football Association) Mitsubishi Motors
	DF	Yoshitada Yamaguchi				(Japan Football Association) Hitachi
	DF	Ryozo Suzuki				(Japan Football Association) Hitachi
	DF	Masakatsu Miyamoto				(Japan Football Association) Furukawa Electric
	DF	Kazuo Imanishi				(Japan Football Association) Toyo Industries
	DF	Hisao Kami				(Japan Football Association) Nippon Steel
	DF	Hiroshi Katayama				(Japan Football Association) Mitsubishi Motors
	MF	Takaji Mori				(Japan Football Association) Mitsubishi Motors
	MF	Aritatsu Ogi				(Japan Football Association) Toyo Industries
	FW	Takeo Kimura				(Japan Football Association) Furukawa Electric
	FW	Ikuo Matsumoto				(Japan Football Association) Toyo Industries
	FW	Yasuyuki Kuwahara				(Japan Football Association) Toyo Industries
	FW	Shigeo Yaegashi				(Japan Football Association) Furukawa Electric
	FW	Teruki Miyamoto				(Japan Football Association) Nippon Steel
	FW	Kunishige Kamamoto				(Japan Football Association) Yanmar Diesel
	FW	Ryuichi Sugiyama				(Japan Football Association) Mitsubishi Steel
	FW	Masashi Watanabe				(Japan Football Association) Nippon Steel

=== Malaysia ===
Head coach: (Malaysia)

No.	Pos.	Player	Date of birth (age)	Caps	Goals	Club
	GK	Chow Chee Keong				
	DF	Abdullah Noordin				
	DF	Foo Fook Chuan				
	MF	Ibrahim Mydin				
	DF	M. Chandran				
	MF	Noordin Jan				
	FW	Wong Fook Yoong				
	FW	Robert Choe				
	FW	Dali Omar				
	FW	Syed Ahmad				
	FW	M. Karathu				

== Group C ==
=== Republic of China ===
Head coach: (Hong Kong) Bao Ging-Jin(鮑景賢)

No.	Pos.	Player	Date of birth (age)	Caps	Goals	Club
	GK	Lau Kin-chung(劉建中)				
	DF	Law Pak(羅北)				
	FW	Kwok Yu(郭有)				
	DF	Kwok Kam-hung(郭錦洪)				
	MF	Lam Seung-yee(林尚義)				
	FW	Mok Chun-wah(莫振華)				
	FW	Cheung Chi-doy(張子岱)				
	FW	Cheung Chi-wai(張子慧)				
	FW	Wong Chi-keung(黃志強)				
		Kwok Chiu-ming (郭秋明)				
		Tsang Geng-hung (曾鏡洪)				
		Lai Tsin-kau (黎展球)				
		Mak Tian-fu(麥天富)				
		Yang Wai-jip(楊偉業)				
		Tsau Siu-hung (周少雄)				
		Tam Hon-sam (譚漢心)				

Hong Kong national team and Republic of China national team shared same fodder of players during pre-1971. Most (if not all) the players playing in the Hong Kong football league. The ROC team practically the A-team, while Hong Kong practically the B-team, with lesser quality of players.

=== Indonesia ===
Head coach: (Indonesia) EA Mangindaan

No.	Pos.	Player	Date of birth (age)	Club
1	GK	Judo Hadianto	8 August 1941 (aged 25)	(Football Association of Indonesia) Persija Jakarta
2	DF	Fam Tek Fong	19 September 1943 (aged 23)	(Football Association of Indonesia) Persija Jakarta
3	DF	John Simon		(Football Association of Indonesia) PSM Makassar
4	DF	Saleh Ramadaud	14 January 1946 (aged 20)	(Football Association of Indonesia) PSM Makassar
5	DF	Sharunah		(Football Association of Indonesia) Persib Bandung
6	DF	Reny Salaki		(Football Association of Indonesia) Persija Jakarta
7	MF	Iswadi Idris	18 March 1948 (aged 18)	(Football Association of Indonesia) Persija Jakarta
8	MF	Mudayat	15 December 1940 (aged 25)	(Football Association of Indonesia) Persebaya Surabaya
9	FW	Abdul Kadir	27 December 1948 (aged 17)	(Football Association of Indonesia) Persebaya Surabaya
10	FW	Soetjipto Soentoro	16 June 1941 (aged 25)	(Football Association of Indonesia) Persija Jakarta
11	MF	Welly Daud		(Football Association of Indonesia) Persebaya Surabaya
12	GK	Lie Tying Siam		(Football Association of Indonesia) Persebaya Surabaya
13	DF	Willy Ang Ching Siang		(Football Association of Indonesia) Persib Bandung
14	DF	Hafid Sijaya Hasan		(Football Association of Indonesia) Persib Bandung
15	MF	Surya Lesmana	20 May 1944 (aged 22)	(Football Association of Indonesia) Persija Jakarta
16	MF	Tahir Jusuf		(Football Association of Indonesia) Persija Jakarta
17	MF	Mohammad Basri	5 October 1942 (aged 24)	(Football Association of Indonesia) PSM Makassar
18	MF	Sinyo Aliandoe	1 July 1940 (aged 26)	(Football Association of Indonesia) Persija Jakarta
19	MF	Andjiek Ali Nurdin		(Football Association of Indonesia) Persebaya Surabaya
20	FW	Max Timisela	7 June 1944 (aged 22)	(Football Association of Indonesia) Persib Bandung
21	FW	Jacob Sihasale	16 April 1944 (aged 22)	(Football Association of Indonesia) Persebaya Surabaya
22	FW	Kwee Tek Liong		(Football Association of Indonesia) Persija Jakarta

=== Singapore ===
Head coach: (Singapore)

No.	Pos.	Player	Date of birth (age)	Caps	Goals	Club
	GK	Wilfred Skinner				
	DF					
	DF					
	MF					
	DF					
	MF					
	FW	Rahim Omar				
	FW					
	FW	Quah Kim Lye				
	FW	Majid Ariff				
	FW	Mohamed Ali Aripp				

=== South Vietnam ===
Head coach: (South Vietnam)

No.	Pos.	Player	Date of birth (age)	Caps	Goals	Club
	GK	Pham Van Rang				
	DF					
	DF					
	MF					
	DF					
	MF	Nguyen Ngoc Thanh				
	FW					
	FW					
	FW					
	FW	Do Thoi Vinh				
	FW	Nguyen van Ngon				
