= Republic of China (Formosa) at the 1960 Summer Olympics =

Formosa at the 1960 Summer Olympics
- Flag of the Republic of China
- IOC code: ROC (RCF used at these Games)
- NOC: Republic of China Olympic Committee (Note: See Chinese Taipei Olympic Committee#History.)

in Rome
- Competitors: 27 (24 men, 3 women) in 6 sports
- Medals Ranked 32nd: Gold 0 Silver 1 Bronze 0 Total 1

Summer Olympics appearances (overview)
- 1956; 1960; 1964; 1968; 1972; 1976–1980; 1984; 1988; 1992; 1996; 2000; 2004; 2008; 2012; 2016; 2020; 2024

Other related appearances
- China (1952–); Chinese Taipei (1956–)

The Republic of China (ROC; commonly called "Taiwan") competed at the 1960 Summer Olympics in Rome, Italy. 27 competitors, 24 men and 3 women, took part in 18 events in 6 sports. The nation won its first ever Olympic medal.

The ROC was forced to use the name "Formosa" (formerly the common Western name for the island). In protest, the athletes marched behind a sign reading "UNDER PROTEST" during the opening ceremony instead of "Formosa".

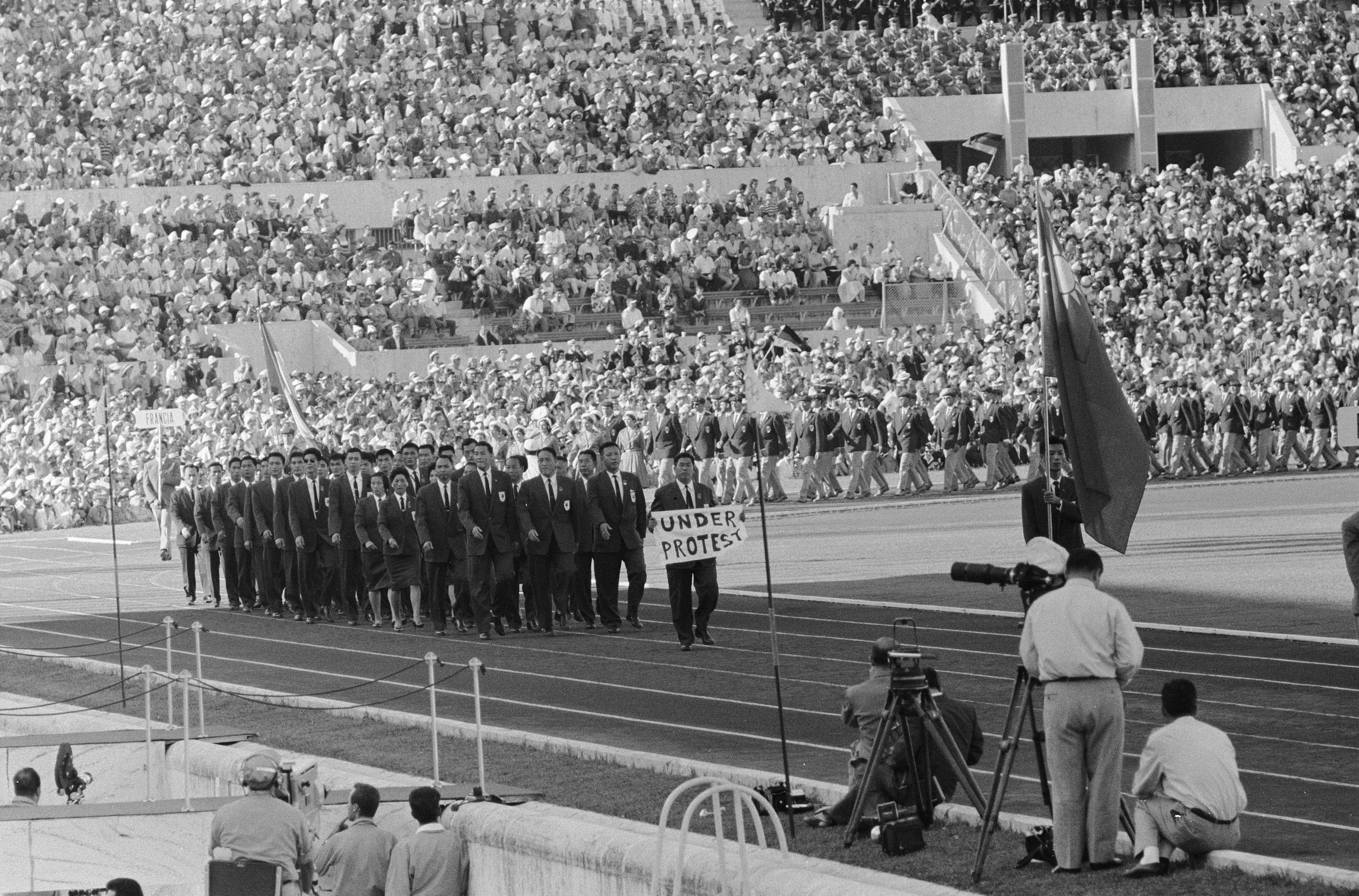
Team of Formosa preceding the French team at the opening ceremony

== Medalists ==
Medal	Name	Sport	Event	Date
Silver	Yang Chuan-kwang	Athletics	Men's decathlon	6 September

== Athletics ==
Key

- Note–Ranks given for track events are within the athlete's heat only
- Q = Qualified for the next round
- q = Qualified for the next round as a fastest loser or, in field events, by position without achieving the qualifying target
- NR = National record
- N/A = Round not applicable for the event
- Bye = Athlete not required to compete in round

=== Track events ===
Athlete	Event	Round 1		Quarterfinal		Semifinal		Final	
Athlete	Event	Result	Rank	Result	Rank	Result	Rank	Result	Rank
Huang Suh-Chuang	Men's 100 m	10.9	5 (h7)	Did not advance					
Huang Suh-Chuang	Men's 200 m	22.3	5 (h4)	Did not advance					
Li Po-Ting	Men's 400 m	49.5	4 (h5)	Did not advance					
Li Po-Ting	Men's 400 m hurdles	54.9	6 (h6)	Did not advance					
Chi Cheng	Women's 80 m hurdles	11.2	5 (h6)	Did not advance					
Yang Chuan-kwang	Men's decathlon	—						8344	2nd place, silver medalist(s)

=== Field events ===
Athlete	Event	Qualification		Final	
Athlete	Event	Result	Rank	Result	Rank
Wu Jin-Yun	Women's high jump	DNS		—	
Lin Chau-Tai	Women's long jump	5.45	25	Did not advance	
Wu Jin-Yun	Women's shot put	12.59	18	Did not advance	
Wu Jin-Yun	Women's discus throw	AC		Did not advance	

== Football ==
The Republic of China finished last in 16th place after failing to qualify for the knockout stage.

=== Group Stage ===
Pos	Team	Pld	W	D	L	GF	GA	GD	Pts	Qualification
1	Italy (H)	3	2	1	0	9	4	+5	5	Advanced to knockout stage
2	Brazil	3	2	0	1	10	6	+4	4	
3	Great Britain	3	1	1	1	8	8	0	3	
4	Taiwan	3	0	0	3	3	12	−9	0	

Source: RSSSF
(H) Hosts
26 August 1960
21:00

Italy	4–1	Taiwan
Rivera 10', 33'; Fanello 49'; Tomeazzi 67'	Report	Mok 29'

Stadio San Paolo, Naples
Referee: Leo Helge (Denmark)

29 August 1960
16:00

Brazil	5–0	Taiwan
Gérson 13', 16', 47'; Roberto Dias 73', 87'	Report

Stadio Flaminio, Rome
Referee: Emil Erlich (Yugoslavia)

1 September 1960
21:00

Great Britain	3–2	Taiwan
Lewis 35'; Brown 58'; Hasty 85'	Report	Yiu 70', 88'

Stadio Olimpico Comunale, Grosseto
Referee: Josef Kandlbinder (West Germany)

== Shooting ==
Three shooters represented the Republic of China in 1960.

25 m pistol

- Chen An-hu

300 m rifle, three positions

- Wu Tao-yan

50 m rifle, three positions

- Wu Tao-yan

Trap

- Wang Ching-rui

== Swimming ==
Men

Athlete	Event	Heat		Semifinal		Final	
Athlete	Event	Time	Rank	Time	Rank	Time	Rank
Laurel Lee	200 m breaststroke	2:52.8	30	Did not advance			
