= Football at the 1960 Summer Olympics – Men's European Qualifiers – Group 5 =

The 1960 Summer Olympics football qualification – Europe Group 5 was one of the seven European groups in the Summer Olympics football qualification tournament to decide which teams would qualify for the Football at the 1960 Summer Olympics finals tournament in Italy. Group 5 consisted of three teams: Great Britain, Republic of Ireland and Netherlands. The teams played against each other home-and-away in a round-robin format. The group winners, Great Britain, qualified directly for the Summer Olympics football finals.

== Standings ==
Pos	Team	Pld	W	D	L	GF	GA	GD	Pts	Qualification	United Kingdom	Ireland	Netherlands
1	Great Britain	4	3	1	0	13	6	+7	7	Qualification for 1960 Summer Olympics	—	3–2	2–2
2	Republic of Ireland	4	1	1	2	9	9	0	3		1–3	—	6–3
3	Netherlands	4	0	2	2	6	13	−7	2		1–5	0–0	—

Source: RSSSF

== Matches ==
14 October 1959

Netherlands	0–0	Republic of Ireland
	Report

21 November 1959

Great Britain	3–2	Republic of Ireland
Hasty 1', 35', 82'	Report	Aherne 60'; Rice 80'

13 March 1960

Republic of Ireland	1–3	Great Britain
McGrath 58'	Report	Coates 47'; Brown 75'; Harding 80'

Dalymount Park, Dublin

2 April 1960

Netherlands	1–5	Great Britain
Hainje 75'	Report	Lewis 21', 83', 85'; Lindsay 47'; Brown 80'

13 April 1960

Great Britain	2–2	Netherlands
Brown 5'; Lewis 60'	Report	de Kleermaeker 70'; Bouwman 75'

White Hart Lane, London

20 April 1960

Republic of Ireland	6–3	Netherlands
McCarthy 5'; McGrath 14', 45'; Hale 20', 81'; van Ierland 56' (o.g.)	Report	Hainje 21'; Bouwman 58'; Slijkhuis 70'

== Goalscorers ==
There were 28 goals scored in 6 matches, for an average of 4.67 goals per match.

4 goals

- (Great Britain Olympic football team) Jim Lewis

3 goals

- (Great Britain Olympic football team) Bobby Brown
- (Great Britain Olympic football team) Paddy Hasty
- (Republic of Ireland Olympic national football team) Mick McGrath

2 goals

- (Republic of Ireland Olympic national football team) Alfie Hale
- (Netherlands Olympic football team) Paul Bouwman
- (Netherlands Olympic football team) Bart Hainje

1 goal

- (Great Britain Olympic football team) Arnold Coates
- (Great Britain Olympic football team) Tony Harding
- (Great Britain Olympic football team) Hugh Lindsay
- (Republic of Ireland Olympic national football team) Mick Aherne
- (Republic of Ireland Olympic national football team) Frank McCarthy
- (Republic of Ireland Olympic national football team) Sonny Rice
- (Netherlands Olympic football team) Leo de Kleermaeker
- (Netherlands Olympic football team) Theo Slijkhuis

1 own goal

- (Netherlands Olympic football team) Frits van Ierland (against Republic of Ireland)
