= Kitaguchi =

Kitaguchi (Japanese: 北口) means northern exit in Japanese. It is a Japanese surname that may refer to the following notable people:

- Akira Kitaguchi (born 1935), Japanese football player
- Haruka Kitaguchi (born 1998), Japanese javelin thrower
- Mizuki Kitaguchi (born 1994), Japanese curler
