= Magistrelli =

Magistrelli is an Italian surname. Notable people with the surname include:

- Luciano Magistrelli (1938–2011), Italian footballer and manager
- Sergio Magistrelli (born 1951), Italian footballer
