= National Board of Review Award for Best Cast =

Annual film award

The National Board of Review Award for Best Acting by an Ensemble (or National Board of Review Award for Best Cast / National Board of Review Award for Best Ensemble Cast) is an annual film award given (since 1994) by the National Board of Review.

== Winners ==
=== 1990s ===
- 1994: Prêt-à-Porter

Katarzyna Figura, Anouk Aimée, Marcello Mastroianni, Sophia Loren, Kim Basinger, Stephen Rea, Lauren Bacall, Julia Roberts, Tim Robbins, Lili Taylor, Tracey Ullman, and Sally Kellerman

- 1995: The Usual Suspects

Kevin Spacey, Gabriel Byrne, Stephen Baldwin, Benicio del Toro, Kevin Pollak, Chazz Palminteri, and Pete Postlethwaite

- 1996: The First Wives Club

Bette Midler, Goldie Hawn, Diane Keaton, Maggie Smith, Dan Hedaya, Sarah Jessica Parker, Stockard Channing, Victor Garber, Stephen Collins, Elizabeth Berkley, Marcia Gay Harden, Bronson Pinchot, Jennifer Dundas, Eileen Heckart, Philip Bosco, Rob Reiner, James Naughton, Ari Greenberg, and Aida Linares

- 1997: The Sweet Hereafter

Ian Holm, Caerthan Banks, Sarah Polley, Tom McCamus, Gabrielle Rose, Alberta Watson, Maury Chaykin, and Stephanie Morgenstern

- 1998: Happiness

Jane Adams, Jon Lovitz, Philip Seymour Hoffman, Dylan Baker, Lara Flynn Boyle, Justin Elvin, Cynthia Stevenson, Lila Glantzman-Leib, Gerry Becker, Rufus Read, Louise Lasser, Ben Gazzara, Camryn Manheim, Arthur J. Nascarella, Molly Shannon, Ann Harada, and Douglas McGrath

- 1999: Magnolia

Tom Cruise, Pat Healy, Julianne Moore, Genevieve Zweig, Mark Flannagan, William H. Macy, Neil Flynn, Philip Seymour Hoffman, and Rod McLachlan

=== 2000s ===
- 2000: State and Main

Alec Baldwin, Charles Durning, Jim Frangione, Clark Gregg, Vincent Guastaferro, Michael Higgins, Philip Seymour Hoffman, Ricky Jay, Jonathan Katz, Linda Kimbrough, Jordan Lage, Morris Lamore, Patti LuPone, William H. Macy, Michael James O'Boyle, Sarah Jessica Parker, David Paymer, Rebecca Pidgeon, Charlotte Potok, Lionel Mark Smith, Allen Soule, and Julia Stiles

- 2001: Last Orders

Michael Caine, Bob Hoskins, Tom Courtenay, David Hemmings, Ray Winstone, and Helen Mirren

- 2002: Nicholas Nickleby

Jamie Bell, Jim Broadbent, Tom Courtenay, Alan Cumming, Edward Fox, Romola Garai, Christopher Plummer, Anne Hathaway, Barry Humphries, Charlie Hunnam, Nathan Lane, Timothy Spall, and Juliet Stevenson

- 2003: The Lord of the Rings: The Return of the King

Sean Astin, Sean Bean, Cate Blanchett, Orlando Bloom, Billy Boyd, Bernard Hill, Ian Holm, Ian McKellen, Dominic Monaghan, Viggo Mortensen, John Noble, Miranda Otto, John Rhys-Davies, Andy Serkis, Liv Tyler, Karl Urban, Hugo Weaving, David Wenham, and Elijah Wood

- 2004: Closer

Jude Law, Clive Owen, Natalie Portman, and Julia Roberts

- 2005: Mrs Henderson Presents

Judi Dench, Bob Hoskins, Will Young, Christopher Guest, Kelly Reilly, and Thelma Barlow

- 2006: The Departed

Anthony Anderson, James Badge Dale, Alec Baldwin, Leonardo DiCaprio, Matt Damon, Jack Nicholson, Martin Sheen, Ray Winstone, Vera Farmiga, and Mark Wahlberg

- 2007: No Country for Old Men

Josh Brolin, Tommy Lee Jones, Javier Bardem, Kelly Macdonald, and Woody Harrelson

- 2008: Doubt

Amy Adams, Viola Davis, Philip Seymour Hoffman, and Meryl Streep

- 2009: It's Complicated

Alec Baldwin, Steve Martin, Meryl Streep, and Lake Bell

=== 2010s ===
- 2010: The Town

Ben Affleck, Chris Cooper, Rebecca Hall, Jon Hamm, Blake Lively, Pete Postlethwaite, and Jeremy Renner

- 2011: The Help

Emma Stone, Viola Davis, Octavia Spencer, Bryce Dallas Howard, Allison Janney, Jessica Chastain, Chris Lowell, Mike Vogel, and Sissy Spacek

- 2012: Les Misérables

Hugh Jackman, Russell Crowe, Anne Hathaway, Amanda Seyfried, Eddie Redmayne, Samantha Barks, Helena Bonham Carter, Sacha Baron Cohen, Aaron Tveit, Colm Wilkinson, and Frances Ruffelle

- 2013: Prisoners

Hugh Jackman, Jake Gyllenhaal, Maria Bello, Viola Davis, Terence Howard, Melissa Leo, Paul Dano, and Dylan Minnette

- 2014: Fury

Brad Pitt, Logan Lerman, Shia LaBeouf, Michael Peña, Jon Bernthal, Jason Isaacs, Scott Eastwood, Xavier Samuel, Brad William Henke, Anamaria Marinca, and Alicia von Rittberg

- 2015: The Big Short

Christian Bale, Steve Carell, Ryan Gosling, Melissa Leo, Hamish Linklater, John Magaro, Brad Pitt, Rafe Spall, Jeremy Strong, Marisa Tomei, and Finn Wittrock

- 2016: Hidden Figures

Taraji P. Henson, Octavia Spencer, Janelle Monáe, Kevin Costner, Kirsten Dunst, and Jim Parsons

- 2017: Get Out

Caleb Landry Jones, Daniel Kaluuya, Catherine Keener, Stephen Root, Lakeith Stanfield, Bradley Whitford, Allison Williams, Lil Rel Howery, and Betty Gabriel

- 2018: Crazy Rich Asians

Awkwafina, Gemma Chan, Henry Golding, Ken Jeong, Lisa Lu, Harry Shum, Jr., Constance Wu, and Michelle Yeoh

- 2019: Knives Out

Ana de Armas, Toni Collette, Daniel Craig, Jamie Lee Curtis, Chris Evans, Don Johnson, Katherine Langford, Jaeden Martell, Christopher Plummer, Michael Shannon, and Lakeith Stanfield

=== 2020s ===
- 2020: Da 5 Bloods

Chadwick Boseman, Paul Walter Hauser, Norm Lewis, Delroy Lindo, Jonathan Majors, Jasper Pääkkönen, Clarke Peters, Jean Reno, Mélanie Thierry, and Isiah Whitlock, Jr.

- 2021: The Harder They Fall

Jonathan Majors, Idris Elba, Zazie Beetz, Regina King, Delroy Lindo, Lakeith Stanfield, RJ Cyler, Danielle Deadwyler

- 2022: Women Talking

Rooney Mara, Claire Foy, Jessie Buckley, Judith Ivey, Ben Whishaw and Frances McDormand

- 2023: The Iron Claw

Zac Efron, Jeremy Allen White, Harris Dickinson, Maura Tierney, Holt McCallany and Lily James

- 2024: Conclave

Ralph Fiennes, Stanley Tucci, Isabella Rossellini, John Lithgow, Lucian Msamati, and Sergio Castellitto

== See also ==
- Critics' Choice Movie Award for Best Acting Ensemble
- Independent Spirit Robert Altman Award
- Screen Actors Guild Award for Outstanding Performance by a Cast in a Motion Picture
