= Huang Chuang =

Huang Chuang may refer to:

- Huang Suh-chuang, Taiwanese sprinter
- Huang Chuang (footballer), Chinese footballer
