= Terence Howard (disambiguation) =

Terence Howard (1937–2021) was an English footballer who played in the 1960 Summer Olympics.

Terence Howard may also refer to:

- Terrence Howard (born 1969), American actor and singer
- Terence Trent Howard or Terence Trent D'Arby (born 1962), American singer
- Terry Howard (born 1966), English former footballer
