= Gavin Devine =

Gavin Devine (born 31 May 1970) is a public relations consultant and lobbyist, and the founder of Park Street Partners.

== Early life and education ==
Devine was born in Barnet, London in 1970. His father, John Hunter Devine was a former footballer, who represented Great Britain in the 1960 Olympic Games.

He was educated at the Royal Grammar School, Guildford. He later studied Politics at the University of York. In 2004, Devine received an MBA from the Open University Business School.

== Work ==
Devine became a clerk in the House of Commons in 1992, working on the Home Affairs Committee before moving to work on the Transport Committee, Environment, Food and Rural Affairs Committee and Channel Tunnel Rail Link Bill Committee. He became a deputy principal clerk and a senior civil servant in 2002.

In 2004, Devine left Parliament and joined AS Biss and Co, progressing to become Deputy Managing Director in 2005. After its merger with Republic PR, he became the Joint MD of Mandate Communications before becoming COO of MHP Communications when that entity was created in 2010. In 2012, he was appointed as CEO of MHP, and then joined Porta Communications as COO in 2016. In 2018 he left Porta and founded Park Street Partners.

For several years, Devine was a member of the Management Committee of the Association of Professional Political Consultants, including a stint as Deputy Chair. In September 2013, Devine was invited to join the Public Relations and Communications Association Board of Management. In June 2019 he was elected to the Executive Committee of the Public Affairs Board.

== Views ==
Devine has been outspoken in the British media on the topic of lobbying and lobbyists. He gave oral evidence to the House of Commons Political and Constitutional Reform Select Committee in September 2013, as part of the Committee's investigation into the Government's proposed Lobbying Bill, and was subsequently quoted on the matter in Parliament. More recently, he was a vocal proponent of the UK remaining in the European Union and continues to comment on the damage caused by Brexit. He has contributed articles to Huffington Post on this and other subjects.
