= Pau King Yin =

Personal information
- Place of birth: British Hong Kong
- Date of death: 30 May 1975
- Place of death: British Hong Kong
- Position: Goalkeeper

International career
Years	Team	Apps	(Gls)
- Republic of China

Managerial career
- 1966: Republic of China
- 1968: Republic of China
- 1971: Republic of China

Pau King Yin
- Traditional Chinese: 鮑景賢
- Simplified Chinese: 鲍景贤
Transcriptions
Standard Mandarin
- Hanyu Pinyin: Bào Jǐngxián

Pau King Yin was a former professional footballer who plays as a goalkeeper.

== Life and career ==
Born in British Hong Kong to ethnic Chinese parent, Pau represented Republic of China (Taiwan) in international level. After retirement he also coached Republic of China national team.

Pau was selected to Hong Kong Chinese official football team that toured Australia in 1953. However, he later withdrew from the team.

== Honours ==
Republic of China

- Asian Games Gold medal: 1954
