= Waichiro Omura =

Japanese footballer

Waichiro Omura 大村 和市郎
Personal information
- Full name: Waichiro Omura
- Date of birth: January 1, 1933
- Place of birth: Shizuoka, Empire of Japan
- Height: 1.75 m (5 ft 9 in)
- Position: Midfielder

Youth career
- Shizuoka Jonai High School
- Rikkyo University

Senior career*
Years	Team	Apps	(Gls)
- Tanabe Pharmaceutical

International career
1956–1958	Japan	5	(0)
- * Club domestic league appearances and goals

Waichiro Omura (大村 和市郎, Ōmura Waichirō; January 1, 1933 – ?) was a Japanese football player. He played for Japan national team.

== Club career ==
Omura was born in Shizuoka Prefecture on January 1, 1933. After graduating from Rikkyo University, he played for Tanabe Pharmaceutical.

== National team career ==
In June 1956, he was selected Japan national team for 1956 Summer Olympics qualification. At this qualification, on June 3, he debuted against South Korea. In November, he played at 1956 Summer Olympics in Melbourne. He also played at 1958 Asian Games. He played 5 games for Japan until 1958.

== National team statistics ==
Japan national team
Year	Apps	Goals
1956	3	0
1957	0	0
1958	2	0
Total	5	0
