= Law Kwok-tai =

Taiwanese footballer (1929–2013)

- 羅國泰
- Born: 5 August 1929; Hong Kong, the British Empire
- Died: 1 September 2013 (aged 84); Hong Kong S.A.R., the People's Republic of China
Other name
Tai Gor 泰哥	(means Brother "Tai")
泰仔	(means Son "Tai")
- Citizenship: British Hong Kong (1929–1997)
- Occupations: association footballer; association football coach
- Height: 1.70 m (5 ft 7 in)
Association football career
- Position: Inside forward
Senior career*
Years	Team	Apps	(Gls)
?–1976	Eastern		
International career
1950s–1960s	Republic of China (Taiwan)		
Managerial career
- ?–1976: Eastern (player-manager)
- 1976–1977: Kwong Wah
- 1977–1982: Sea Bee
- 1982–1983: Tsuen Wan
- 198?–1985: Eastern
- 1985–1987: Eastern
- 1987–1988: Po Chai Pills
- 1988–1989: Happy Valley
- 1990–1991: Martini
- 1991–?: Singtao
Medal record
Men's football
Representing Taiwan
AFC Asian Cup
Third place	1960 South Korea
Asian Games
Gold medal – first place	1958 Tokyo
- * Club domestic league appearances and goals

Chinese name
- Traditional Chinese: 羅國泰
- Simplified Chinese: 罗国泰
Transcriptions
Standard Mandarin
- Hanyu Pinyin: Luō Guó Tài
- Wade–Giles: Luo Kuo T'ai
Yue: Cantonese
- Jyutping: Lo4 Gwok3 Taai3

Law Kwok-tai (or transliterated as Lo Kwok Tai; 5 August 1929 – 1 September 2013) was a football coach and a Republic of China (Taiwan) international footballer, but born and spent his entire playing and coaching career in the British Hong Kong, a colony that geographically located in the southern China. Law retired as a professional footballer in 1976, aged 47. That season he was a player-manager. He coached until the 1990s, at aged 60s. At international level, he played for Republic of China (Taiwan) in the Olympics as well as Asian Games and AFC Asian Cup. He also played for Hong Kong League XI in non-official match in Merdeka Tournament, as well as "Hong Kong Chinese" team in another friendly tournament, Ho Ho Cup.

== Club career ==
At club level, Law played for Eastern of the Hong Kong First Division League.

== International career ==
Law participated in the 1960 Olympics for the Republic of China (Taiwan, now played as Chinese Taipei). He played his only appearance in that tournament, against Brazil.

He also played in the 1960 and 1968 AFC Asian Cup, as well as 1958 Asian Games, where he won the goal medal. He scored against his native Hong Kong in 1968 AFC Asian Cup.

He also represented Hong Kong League XI, a scratch team of the Hong Kong Football Association (HKFA) for 1957 Merdeka Tournament, a friendly tournament. The team was mainly composed of players from the football club Eastern, but most of them in fact ineligible to Hong Kong team, who already played for aforementioned Republic of China (Taiwan).

He also represented another team Hong Kong Chinese team in 1959, against Costa Rican club Deportivo Saprissa in a friendly match and against Malayan Chinese team in the Ho Ho Cup. The team was selected by the Chinese Football Association of Hong Kong, a sub-association of HKFA, the Chinese Amateur Athletic Federation of Hong Kong and China National Football Association of Taiwan.

== Coaching career ==
After retirement as a professional footballer, Law became a football coach. He coached Eastern, (as player-manager in 1975–76 season and in the 1980s), Kwong Wah, Sea Bee, Tsuen Wan, Po Chai Pills, Happy Valley, as well as Martini (1990–91) and Singtao (1991 to ?) in the 1990s. Those clubs were all based in Hong Kong.

=== Sea Bee ===
Law was hired as the head coach of Sea Bee in 1977. He coached the team until the end of the 1981–82 Hong Kong First Division League.

He also attended an advanced coaching course that was conducted by a West German coach as well as sponsored by the West German Consulate General Hong Kong in 1980.

=== Tsuen Wan ===
Law was the head coach of Tsuen Wan from 1982. He was dismissed in January 1983.

=== Eastern (second and the third spells) ===
Law was the head coach of Eastern in the 1980s. He resigned in April 1985. The club also promoted his assistant But Wai-hong (畢偉康) as head coach.

Law was re-hired by Eastern in November 1985 as vice-manager (副領隊) and head coach (總教練). In the next season, Law and Leung Chun-kuen (梁振權) were hired as joint-head coach (教練) of Eastern in June 1986. The latter was promoted from footballer and would attended coaching class in August 1986 in the United Kingdom. In June 1987, Law was reassigned from the head coach to the technical consultant (技術顧問) of Eastern. Soon later he left the club.

=== Po Chai Pills ===
Law was hired as head coach by Po Chai Pills, a newcomer of 1987–88 Hong Kong First Division League in 1987. The club is a namesake of the Po Chai Pills, a proprietary Chinese medicine. The club relegated back to the second division in 1988.

=== Happy Valley ===
Law and Chan Kwok-hung (陳國雄) were hired by Happy Valley as joint-head coach in 1988, while the former manager (領隊) Mr. Leung/Leong/Liang (梁子明) was assigned a more administrative role by the head (and financial contributor) of the football section (足主) of the club, Ricky Yu Kam-wai (余錦偉), as an assistant of Yu's brother, Lawrence Yu Kam-kee.

He won Hong Kong First Division League with Happy Valley in 1989. However, his contract was not renewed.

=== Martini ===
Law was hired by Martini (馬天尼), a club from the second division as head coach in the 1990–91 season. He resigned in January 1991 but changed his mind in the same month. He resigned again in March 1991.

=== Singtao ===
Law was hired by Singtao in June 1991, replacing Chan Hung-ping (陳鴻平).

== Honours ==
=== Player ===
Republic of China

- AFC Asian Cup: 3rd place, 1960
- Asian Games: Gold medal, 1958

=== As coach ===
- Hong Kong First Division League
  - 1988–89 (Happy Valley)

== Personal life ==
Law was known for pro-Republic of China (Taiwan) as his political affiliation. In 1962, an advertisement on New Evening Post, claimed Law and some of the footballers, congratulated the 12th anniversary of the establishment of New Evening Post, a pro-People's Republic of China (Chinese Communist Party) newspaper. However, another open letter on Hong Kong Times, a pro-Republic of China (Taiwan) and Kuomintang newspaper, Law and three other people, declared that they did not endorse to put their names on the advertisement.

Law died on 1 September 2013 in the Eastern Hospital, Hong Kong, according to Eastern Football Team; or before 2014, according to former teammate Law Pak during an interview.
