= Yoshio Furukawa =

Japanese footballer

Yoshio Furukawa 古川 好男
Personal information
- Full name: Yoshio Furukawa
- Date of birth: July 5, 1934 (age 92)
- Place of birth: Osaka, Empire of Japan
- Position: Goalkeeper

Youth career
- 1950–1952: Meisei High School

College career
Years	Team	Apps	(Gls)
1953–1956	Kansai University		

Senior career*
Years	Team	Apps	(Gls)
1957–????	Dunlop Japan		

International career
1956–1962	Japan	19	(0)
- * Club domestic league appearances and goals

Yoshio Furukawa (古川 好男, Furukawa Yoshio; born July 5, 1934) is a former Japanese football player. He played for Japan national team.

== Club career ==
Furukawa was born in Osaka Prefecture on July 5, 1934. After graduating from Kansai University, he joined Dunlop Japan in 1957.

== National team career ==
In June 1956, when Furukawa was a Kansai University student, he was selected for the Japan national team for the 1956 Summer Olympics qualification. At this qualification, on June 3, he debuted against South Korea. In November, he played in the 1956 Summer Olympics in Melbourne. He also played in the 1958 Asian Games. He played 19 games for Japan until 1962.

== National team statistics ==
Japan national team
Year	Apps	Goals
1956	3	0
1957	0	0
1958	3	0
1959	10	0
1960	0	0
1961	1	0
1962	2	0
Total	19	0
