= Sonny Rice =

Irish association footballer

Personal information
- Full name: Michael Rice
- Date of birth: 1936 or 1937 (age 89)
- Place of birth: Republic of Ireland
- Position: Inside forward

Senior career*
Years	Team	Apps	(Gls)
- Shamrock Rovers
–1957	Bohemians		
1956	→ Pwllheli & District (loan)		
1957–????	Pwllheli & District		
1962–1964	Drumcondra		
1964–1966	Bangor		
- Crusaders
1967–????	Knutsford		
- Witton Albion

International career
1956–1962	Republic of Ireland amateurs	13	(1+)
- * Club domestic league appearances and goals

Michael Rice (born 1936 or 1937), also known as Sonny Rice, is an Irish former association footballer who played as an inside forward.

== Club career ==
Rice started his career in the Republic of Ireland with Shamrock Rovers and Bohemians, where he scored 39 goals across all competitions during the 1956–57 season. Early in that season, he briefly joined Welsh club Pwllheli & District on loan, before joining them permanently Pwllheli & District in July 1957. In October 1960, prior to a league match against Prestatyn Town, a Prestatyn Town fan attempted to bribe Rice by offering him £25 to not play in the match, forcing the match to be delayed as he gave his statement to police.

In 1961, he scored twice for a Dublin All-Stars team against a St. Michael's select side.

Rice signed for Irish club Drumcondra in the summer of 1962. Shortly after, he scored his first goal in European competition, during a 4–2 defeat to Stævnet Odense in the 1962–63 Inter-Cities Fairs Cup. On 19 September 1964, he was signed by Charlie Tully for Northern Irish club Bangor, making his debut against Portadown that same day. By November 1965, he submitted a transfer request to Bangor amid interest from teams like Derry City, Ards, and Ballymena United, which the club declined.

Following a stint in Canada, Rice joined Knutsford in 1967. He later played for Witton Albion in 1972.

== International career ==
Rice represented the Republic of Ireland amateur national team between 1956 and 1962. In November 1959, Rice scored in a 3–2 defeat to Great Britain during qualification for the 1960 Summer Olympics. In total, Rice made 13 appearances for the Republic of Ireland amateur team.
