= Tommy Forde =

Northern Ireland footballer (1931–2012

Personal information
- Full name: John Thomas Forde
- Date of birth: 14 March 1931
- Place of birth: Belfast, Northern Ireland
- Date of death: 3 January 2012 (aged 80)
- Place of death: Adelaide, Australia
- Height: 5 ft 10 in (1.78 m)
- Position: Centre half

Senior career*
Years	Team	Apps	(Gls)
1950–1951	Distillery		
1951	Wolverhampton Wanderers	0	(0)
1951–1953	Glenavon		
1953–1962	Ards	314	(40)
1962–1963	Distillery		

International career
1958–1960	Northern Ireland	4	(0)
- * Club domestic league appearances and goals

John Thomas Forde (14 March 1931 – 3 January 2012) was a Northern Irish professional footballer who played as a centre half for Distillery, Wolverhampton Wanderers, Glenavon and Ards. Forde also earned four caps at international level for Northern Ireland between 1958 and 1960.

Forde was the elder brother of Hugh Forde. Tommy Forde died in Adelaide on 3 January 2012, at the age of 80.
