= Jonas (footballer, born 1943) =

Brazilian footballer

Personal information
- Full name: Jonas Bento de Carvalho
- Date of birth: 22 July 1943
- Place of birth: São Paulo, Brazil
- Date of death: 21 February 1964 (aged 20)
- Place of death: São Paulo, Brazil
- Position: Midfielder

Youth career
- –1960: São Paulo

Senior career*
Years	Team	Apps	(Gls)
1960–1962	São Paulo	11	(2)
1961	→ Internacional (loan)		
1962	→ AA Votuporanguense (loan)		

International career
1960	Brazil Olympic	3	(0)
- * Club domestic league appearances and goals

Jonas Bento de Carvalho (22 July 1943 – 21 February 1964) was a Brazilian footballer who played as a midfielder.

== Career ==
Revealed in São Paulo, still as an amateur athlete, he represented Brazil at the 1960 Summer Olympics. He would later play professionally, but due to cancer, he had to abandon his career in 1962. He died in 1964.
