= Hugh Forde (footballer) =

Northern Irish footballer

Personal information
- Date of birth: 31 January 1936 (age 90)
- Place of birth: Belfast, Northern Ireland
- Height: 1.78 m (5 ft 10 in)
- Position: Left half

Senior career*
Years	Team	Apps	(Gls)
–	Distillery	?	(?)
–	Ards	?	(?)
–	Distillery	?	(?)
–	Glenavon	?	(?)

International career
1960	Great Britain	1	(0)
- * Club domestic league appearances and goals

Hugh Forde (born 31 January 1936) is a Northern Irish former amateur footballer who played as a left half, representing Great Britain at the 1960 Summer Olympics. He played club football for Distillery, Ards and Glenavon, and is the younger brother of Tommy Forde. He later lived in Australia.
