= Zvi Moisescu =

Israeli footballer

Personal information
- Date of birth: 13 September 1939
- Place of birth: Sinaia, Romania
- Date of death: 4 January 2013 (aged 73)
- Place of death: Netanya, Israel
- Position: Defender

Youth career
- 1957: Maccabi Netanya

Senior career*
Years	Team	Apps	(Gls)
1957–1965	Maccabi Netanya	114	

International career
1960	Israel (Note: Including two appearances for Israel's Olympic team.)	8	(0)
- * Club domestic league appearances and goals

Zvi Moisescu (13 September 1939 - 4 January 2013) was a Romanian-Israeli footballer who played as a defender.

== International career ==
Zvi Moisescu played six games at international level for Israel. Three games were at the 1960 Asian Cup, and two at the 1962 World Cup qualifiers. He also appeared twice for Israel's Olympic team at the 1960 Summer Olympics qualifiers.

== Honours ==
Maccabi Netanya

- Second Division: 1963–64

Israel

- AFC Asian Cup runner-up: 1960
