= Mordechai Benbinisti =

Israeli footballer

Mordechai Benbinisti מרדכי בנבינשתי
Personal information
- Date of birth: 1 March 1938 (age 88)
- Place of birth: Jerusalem, Israel
- Position: Defender

Senior career*
Years	Team	Apps	(Gls)
1957–1963	Hapoel Jerusalem		
1963–1969	Hapoel Ramat Gan		

International career
1960–1961	Israel	13	(0)
- * Club domestic league appearances and goals

Mordechai Benbinisti (Hebrew: מרדכי בנבינשתי; born 1 March 1938) is an Israeli footballer. He played in 13 matches for the Israel national team from 1960 to 1961.
