= Billy Neil (footballer, born 1939) =

Scottish footballer (1939–2014)

Personal information
- Full name: William Neil
- Date of birth: 22 May 1939
- Place of birth: Airdrie, Scotland
- Date of death: 22 September 2014 (aged 75)
- Place of death: Edinburgh, Scotland
- Height: 1.83 m (6 ft 0 in)
- Position: Centre half

Senior career*
Years	Team	Apps	(Gls)
1956–1961	Airdrieonians	49	(0)
1961–1972	Queen's Park	326	(12)
Total		375	(12)

International career
1957–1969	Scotland Amateur	45	(0)
1960	Great Britain	1	(0)
- * Club domestic league appearances and goals

William Neil (22 May 1939 – 22 September 2014) was a Scottish footballer who represented Great Britain at the 1960 Summer Olympics. Neil, who played as a centre half, played in the Scottish Football League for Airdrieonians and Queen's Park between 1956 and 1972. Neil holds the record for the player with the most amateur caps. He died on 22 September 2014, at the age of 75.
