= Thio Him Tjiang =

Indonesian footballer

Personal information
- Date of birth: 28 August 1929
- Place of birth: Batavia, Dutch East Indies
- Date of death: 14 February 2015 (aged 85)
- Place of death: Jakarta, Indonesia
- Position: Midfielder

Senior career*
Years	Team	Apps	(Gls)
1947–1950	UMS 1905		
1950–1961	Persija Jakarta		
1961–1962	Persib Bandung		

International career
1954–1962	Indonesia	43	(2)
Medal record
Men's football
Representing Indonesia
Asian Games
Bronze medal – third place	1958 Tokyo
- * Club domestic league appearances and goals

Thio Him Tjiang (28 August 1929 – 14 February 2015) was an Indonesian footballer. He competed in the men's tournament at the 1956 Summer Olympics.

== Honours ==
Indonesia

- Asian Games Bronze medal: 1958
