= Dary (footballer) =

Brazilian footballer (born 1940)

Personal information
- Full name: Dary Batista de Oliveira
- Date of birth: 20 October 1940 (age 86)
- Place of birth: Campos dos Goytacazes, Brazil
- Position: Defender

Senior career*
Years	Team	Apps	(Gls)
1957–1965	Fluminense	127	(1)
1966	Atlético Mineiro	22	(0)
1967–1969	Nacional-SP		

International career
1959–1960	Brazil Olympic	12	(0)
1963	Brazil	1	(0)
Medal record
Men's Football
Representing Brazil
Pan American Games
Silver medal – second place	1959 Chicago
- * Club domestic league appearances and goals

Dary Batista de Oliveira (born 20 October 1940) is a Brazilian former footballer who played as a defender. He was part of the Brazil national team that competed in the 1959 Pan American Games and the 1960 Summer Olympics.

Dary also played one "Full A" match, on 13 April 1963, against Argentina.

== Honours ==
Fluminense

- Campeonato Carioca: 1964
