= Dov Atzmon =

Israeli footballer

Dov Atzmon דב עצמון
Personal information
- Date of birth: 23 October 1941 (age 85)
- Place of birth: Jerusalem, Israel
- Date of death: 12 October 2020 (aged 78)
- Position: Defender

Senior career*
Years	Team	Apps	(Gls)
1958–1963	Hapoel Jerusalem		
1964–1972	Hapoel Haifa		
1972–1973	Hapoel Hadera		
1973–1975	Hapoel Kiryat Ata		

International career
1961–1965	Israel	8	(0)
- * Club domestic league appearances and goals

Dov Atzmon (Hebrew: דב עצמון; 23 October 1941 — 12 October 2020) was an Israeli footballer. He played in 8 matches for the Israel national football team from 1961 to 1965.

== Career ==
Atzmon started to play football for Hapoel Jerusalem, playing there for 6 seasons. In 1964, he moved to Hapoel Haifa, where he was the penalty kicker and scored 20 goals for Hapoel during 8 seasons. In addition, he won once in the Israel State Cup.

On 14 December 1961, he made his debut for Israel national football team in the 0–2 loss to Yugoslavia.

== Honours ==
Hapoel Haifa

- Israel State Cup: 1965–66
