= Wanderley (footballer, born 1938) =

Brazilian footballer (1938–2020)

Personal information
- Full name: Wanderley Machado da Silva
- Date of birth: 3 June 1938
- Place of birth: Niterói, Brazil
- Date of death: 5 March 2020 (aged 81)
- Place of death: Massanassa, Spain
- Position: Forward

Senior career*
Years	Team	Apps	(Gls)
?–1961	Vasco da Gama		
1961–1962	Elche	0	(0)
1962–1967	Levante	104	(47)
1967–1970	Málaga	56	(21)
1970–1972	Hércules	9	(0)
Total		169	(68)

International career
1960	Brazil Olympic	3	(1)
- * Club domestic league appearances and goals

Wanderley Machado da Silva (3 June 1938 – 5 March 2020), known simply as Wanderley, was a Brazilian footballer who played as a forward.

He all but spent his professional career in Spain, with Levante, Málaga and Hércules.

Wanderley was part of Brazil's 1960 Summer Olympics team.

== Club career ==
Born in Niterói, Rio de Janeiro, Wanderley began his career at CR Vasco da Gama. Profiting from his brother's signature with Valencia CF he also moved to Europe, but after being shown the door by the latter club, joined neighbouring Elche CF.

In 1962, Wanderley signed for Levante UD also in the Valencian Community, being only registered on 1 January 1963. He enjoyed a prolific first season, scoring 12 goals in only 16 matches and helping to their first-ever promotion to La Liga.

Wanderley made his debut in the Spanish top division on 15 September 1963, in a 4–4 away draw against RCD Español. He scored his first goal in the competition on the 28th, but in a 5–3 loss at Valencia.

Wanderley was an ever-present figure for the Granotes in the following campaigns, scoring a hat-trick in the 4–2 home victory over Atlético Ceuta on 15 January 1967. He left in that summer, and subsequently represented CD Málaga and Hércules CF, retiring in 1972 aged 34.

== International career ==
Wanderley appeared with the Brazil under-23 team at the 1960 Summer Olympics, appearing in all the matches and scoring in a 4–3 win against Great Britain. The nation was eliminated in the group stage by hosts Italy.

== Personal life and death ==
Wanderley's older brother, Waldo, was also a footballer and a forward. He spent most of his career with Fluminense FC and Valencia, and the pair were teammates at Hércules.

Wanderley settled in the Valencian municipality of Massanassa after retiring. On 5 March 2020, he died due to Alzheimer's disease at the age of 81.
