= Roy Sleap =

English footballer

Personal information
- Full name: Roy Walter Sleap
- Date of birth: 5 September 1940
- Place of birth: London, England
- Date of death: 3 October 2005 (aged 65)
- Place of death: Surrey, England
- Position: Midfielder

Senior career*
| Years | Team | Apps | (Gls) |
- Barnet
- Enfield
- Hendon

International career
| 1960 | Great Britain | 2 | (0) |
| 1959–1968 | England Amateurs | 23 | (0) |
- * Club domestic league appearances and goals

Roy Walter Sleap (5 September 1940 – 3 October 2005) was an English footballer who represented Great Britain at the 1960 Summer Olympics. Sleap played as an amateur for Barnet.

== Early life ==
He attended Edmonton County School from 1952.
