= Opa Mangindaan =

Indonesian footballer and manager

Personal information
- Full name: Ernest Alberth Mangindaan
- Date of birth: 22 November 1910
- Place of birth: Indonesia
- Date of death: 3 June 2000 (aged 89)
- Place of death: Indonesia
- Position: Midfielder

Senior career*
Years	Team	Apps	(Gls)
- PSM Makassar

Managerial career
- 1950: PSM Makassar
- 1966–1970: Indonesia
- * Club domestic league appearances and goals

Ernest Alberth Mangindaan (22 November 1910 – 3 June 2000) was an Indonesian former football manager and footballer who last managed Indonesia.

== Career ==
Mangindaan managed the Indonesia national football team.
