= Valdir (footballer, born 1937) =

Brazilian footballer (1937–1977)

Personal information
- Full name: Waldir Alves Figueiras
- Date of birth: 11 November 1937
- Date of death: 17 July 1977 (aged 39)
- Position: Forward

Senior career*
Years	Team	Apps	(Gls)
- Nacional (SP)
- * Club domestic league appearances and goals

Waldir Alves Figueiras (11 November 1937 – 17 July 1977) was a Brazilian footballer who played as a forward. He was a member of the Brazil team that competed in the 1960 Summer Olympics.
