= Orazio Rancati =

Italian footballer (1940–2023)

Personal information
- Date of birth: 9 March 1940
- Place of birth: Morbegno, Italy
- Date of death: 17 October 2023 (aged 83)
- Height: 1.68 m (5 ft 6 in)
- Position: Midfielder

Senior career*
Years	Team	Apps	(Gls)
1958–1961	Internazionale	11	(4)
1961	Genoa	3	(0)
1961–1962	AC Reggiana	6	(1)
1962–1963	Civitanovese	29	(2)
1963–1965	Triestina	39	(5)
1965–1967	Cesena	58	(4)
1967–1969	Imola	65	(40)
1969–1972	Parma	95	(40)
1972–1973	Asti	21	(1)
1977	Sondrio		

International career
1960	Italy Olympic	2	(0)

Managerial career
- 1973–1987: Sondrio
- * Club domestic league appearances and goals

Orazio Rancati (9 March 1940 – 17 October 2023) was an Italian footballer who played as a midfielder. He competed in the men's tournament at the 1960 Summer Olympics.

Rancati died on 17 October 2023, at the age of 83.
