= Jurandir (footballer, born 1938) =

Brazilian footballer

Personal information
- Full name: Álvaro Vilela Jurandir
- Date of birth: 19 December 1938 (age 87)
- Position: Defender

Senior career*
Years	Team	Apps	(Gls)
- Marília
- * Club domestic league appearances and goals

Álvaro Vilela Jurandir (born 19 December 1938) is a Brazilian former footballer played as a defender. He was a member of the Brazil national team that competed in the 1960 Summer Olympics.
