= Michael Greenwood =

English footballer (1935–2021)

Personal information
- Date of birth: 9 April 1935
- Place of birth: Barnsley, England
- Date of death: 25 April 2021 (aged 86)
- Height: 1.74 m (5 ft 8 1/2 in)
- Position: Midfielder

Senior career*
Years	Team	Apps	(Gls)
1959–1962	Bishop Auckland		

International career
1960	Great Britain	1	(0)
- * Club domestic league appearances and goals

Michael Moore Greenwood (9 April 1935 – 25 April 2021) was an English footballer who played as a midfielder.

== Career ==
Greenwood, who played as an amateur for Bishop Auckland at the time, represented Great Britain at the 1960 Summer Olympics, making one appearance in the tournament. He combined his football career with working as a PE teacher.

Greenwood later worked at the National Sports Centre at Lilleshall Hall and was also employed by the Sports Council in West Yorkshire.

== Later life and death ==
As of April 2012 he was living in Harrogate, North Yorkshire. He organises reunions for the surviving players of the 1960 Olympic squad.

In April 2012, Greenwood publicly expressed a number of concerns about the British team due to compete at the 2012 Summer Olympics in London.

Greenwood died on 25 April 2021, at the age of 86.
