= Nonô (footballer, born 1940) =

Brazilian footballer

Personal information
- Full name: Cláudionor Reinaldo Franco
- Date of birth: 13 February 1940 (age 86)
- Position: Defender

Senior career*
Years	Team	Apps	(Gls)
- Fluminense
- * Club domestic league appearances and goals

Cláudionor Reinaldo Franco (born 13 February 1940), known as just Nonô, is a Brazilian former footballer. He was part of the Brazil national squad that competed in the 1960 Summer Olympics.
