= Rubens (footballer, born 1941) =

Jorge Rubens Caetano; Brazilian footballer (1941–2016)

Personal information
- Full name: Jorge Rubens Caetano
- Date of birth: 19 June 1941
- Place of birth: Rio de Janeiro, Brazil
- Date of death: 5 December 2016 (aged 75)
- Place of death: Valinhos, São Paulo, Brazil
- Position: Defender

Senior career*
Years	Team	Apps	(Gls)
1960	Fluminense		
1962	São Paulo	13	(0)
1964	Palmeiras	4	(0)
- Prudentina

International career
1959–1960	Brazil Olympic	16	(0)
Medal record
Men's Football
Representing Brazil
Pan American Games
Silver medal – second place	1959 Chicago
- * Club domestic league appearances and goals

Jorge Rubens Caetano (19 June 1941 – 5 December 2016) was a Brazilian footballer who played as a defender.

Rubens was part of the Brazil national team that competed in the 1959 Pan American Games and 1960 Summer Olympics.

He died on 5 December 2016, at the age of 75.
