= Dércio Gil =

Brazilian footballer (born 1938)

Personal information
- Full name: Dércio Gil
- Date of birth: 10 September 1938 (age 88)
- Position: Defender

Senior career*
Years	Team	Apps	(Gls)
- Palmeiras
- * Club domestic league appearances and goals

Dércio Gil (born 10 September 1938) is a Brazilian former footballer. He was part of the Brazil national team that competed in the 1960 Summer Olympics.
