= Leslie Brown (English footballer) =

English footballer (1936–2021)

Personal information
- Date of birth: 27 November 1936
- Place of birth: England
- Date of death: 30 January 2021 (aged 84)
- Position: Midfielder

Senior career*
Years	Team	Apps	(Gls)
1959–1960	Dulwich Hamlet	227	(121)
1961–1965	Wimbledon	169	(89)

International career
1960–1962	England Amateur	8	(3)

Managerial career
- Whyteleafe
- * Club domestic league appearances and goals

Leslie Brown (27 November 1936 – 30 January 2021) was an English association football midfielder. He was part of the Great Britain team at the 1960 Summer Olympics, but he did not play in any matches. He later became an entrepreneur. Brown died on 30 January 2021, at the age of 84.
