= Chiquinho (footballer, born 1941) =

Brazilian footballer

Personal information
- Full name: Francisco de Castro Gonçalves
- Date of birth: 27 January 1941 (age 85)
- Position: Forward

Senior career*
Years	Team	Apps	(Gls)
- Yuracan
- * Club domestic league appearances and goals

Francisco de Castro Gonçalves (born 27 January 1941) is a Brazilian former footballer who represented the Brazil national team at the 1960 Summer Olympics.
