= Mike Pinner =

English footballer (1934–2023)

Personal information
- Full name: Michael John Pinner
- Date of birth: 16 February 1934
- Place of birth: Boston, Lincolnshire, England
- Date of death: 2 May 2023 (aged 89)
- Height: 1.82 m (6 ft 0 in)
- Position: Goalkeeper

Youth career
- Boston Grammar School
- Wyberton Rangers
- Notts County
- Cambridge University
- Hendon
- Pegasus

Senior career*
Years	Team	Apps	(Gls)
1954–1957	Aston Villa	4	(0)
1957	Arsenal	0	(0)
1957–1959	Sheffield Wednesday	7	(0)
1959	Corinthian-Casuals		
1959–1961	Queens Park Rangers	19	(0)
1961	Manchester United	4	(0)
1961–1962	Chelsea	1	(0)
1962	Hendon		
1962	Swansea City	1	(0)
1962	Hendon		
1962–1965	Leyton Orient	77	(0)
- Distillery
Total		113	(0)

International career
	England amateur	52	(0)
1956–1960	Great Britain	3	(0)
- * Club domestic league appearances and goals

Michael John Pinner (16 February 1934 – 2 May 2023) was an English amateur footballer who played as a goalkeeper.

== Club career ==
Born in Boston, Pinner spent his early career with Boston Grammar School, Wyberton Rangers, Notts County, Cambridge University, Hendon, Pegasus, Aston Villa and Arsenal. He later played for Sheffield Wednesday, Corinthian-Casuals, Queens Park Rangers, Manchester United, Chelsea, Hendon, Swansea City, Leyton Orient and Distillery.

== International career ==
Pinner played for the England amateur national team, earning 52 caps.

Pinner also participated for Great Britain at the Olympics in 1956 and 1960, making three appearances in total.

== Later career ==
Pinner combined his amateur playing career with his day job as a lawyer, and he later became a property developer, living in London after retiring.
