= Wu Jin-yun =

Taiwanese athletics competitor (1938–2022)

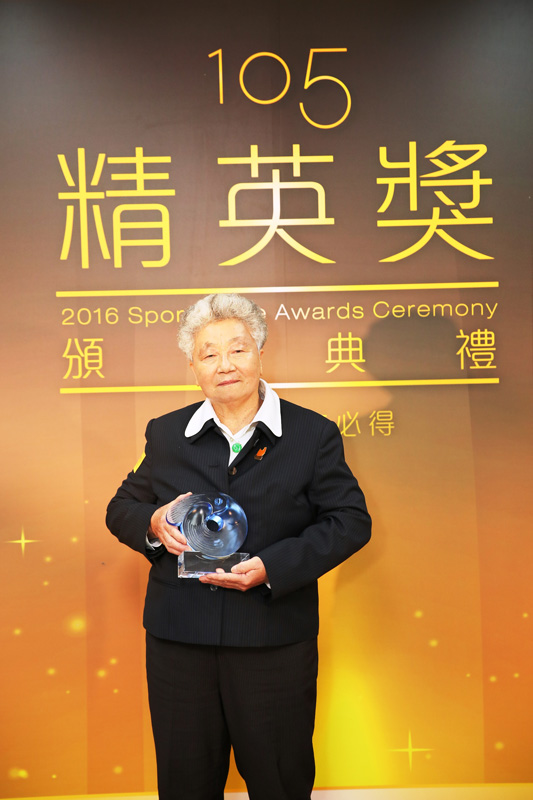
- Wu Jin-yun in 2016

Personal information
- Nationality: Taiwanese
- Born: 3 March 1938 Pingtung, Taiwan
- Died: 27 June 2022 (aged 84)

Sport
- Sport: Athletics
- Events: Shot put; Discus

Wu Jin-yun (3 March 1938 – 27 June 2022) was a Taiwanese athlete. She competed in the women's shot put and the women's discus throw at the 1960 Summer Olympics.
