= Akira Kitaguchi =

Japanese footballer

Akira Kitaguchi 北口 晃
Personal information
- Full name: Akira Kitaguchi
- Date of birth: March 8, 1935 (age 91)
- Place of birth: Osaka, Empire of Japan
- Height: 1.72 m (5 ft 7 1/2 in)
- Position: Forward

Youth career
- 1950–1952: Meisei High School
- 1953–1956: Kwansei Gakuin University

Senior career*
Years	Team	Apps	(Gls)
1957–1966	Mitsubishi Motors	4	(0)
Total		4	(0)

International career
1958–1959	Japan	10	(1)
- * Club domestic league appearances and goals

Akira Kitaguchi (北口 晃, Kitaguchi Akira; born March 8, 1935) is a former Japanese football player. He played for Japan national team.

== Club career ==
Kitaguchi was born in Osaka Prefecture on March 8, 1935. After graduating from Kwansei Gakuin University, he joined Mitsubishi Motors in 1957. In 1965, Mitsubishi Motors joined new league Japan Soccer League. He retired in 1966. He played 4 games in the league.

== National team career ==
In 1956, when Kitaguchi was a Kwansei Gakuin University student, he was selected Japan national team for 1956 Summer Olympics in Melbourne, but he did not compete. In May 1958, he was selected Japan for 1958 Asian Games. At this competition, on May 26, he debuted against Philippines. He played 10 games and scored 1 goal for Japan until 1959.

== National team statistics ==
Japan national team
Year	Apps	Goals
1958	3	1
1959	7	0
Total	10	1
