= Ron McKinven =

Scottish footballer (1936–2022)

Personal information
- Date of birth: 8 January 1936
- Place of birth: Alloa, Scotland
- Date of death: November 2022 (aged 86)
- Position: Wing half

Senior career*
| Years | Team | Apps | (Gls) |
| 1953–1955 | Queen's Park | 9 | (4) |
| 1955–1956 | Stirling Albion | 4 | (0) |
| 1956–1959 | Queen's Park | 49 | (0) |
| 1959–1966 | St Johnstone | 206 | (11) |
| Total | | 268 | (15) |

International career
| 1960 | Great Britain | ? | (?) |
- * Club domestic league appearances and goals

Ronald McKinven (8 January 1936 – November 2022) was a Scottish professional footballer who played as a wing half, making over 250 appearances in the Scottish Football League.

== Career ==
=== Club career ===
McKinven played in the Scottish Football League for Queen's Park, Stirling Albion and St Johnstone.

=== International career ===
McKinven represented Great Britain at the 1960 Summer Olympics.

== Personal life and death ==
McKinven was born in Alloa on 8 January 1936. After retiring as a footballer he became an interior designer.

McKinven died in November 2022, at the age of 86.
