= Armando Favalli =

Italian footballer (1939–1965)

Personal information
- Date of birth: 20 May 1939
- Place of birth: Robecco d'Oglio, Italy
- Date of death: 10 June 1965 (aged 26)
- Place of death: Calvatone, Italy
- Positions: Midfielder; forward

Senior career*
Years	Team	Apps	(Gls)
1957–1959	US Cremonese	36	(12)
1959–1964	Brescia	125	(17)
1964–1965	Foggia	32	(2)

International career
1960	Italy		
- * Club domestic league appearances and goals

Armando or Armanno Favalli (20 May 1939 – 10 June 1965) was an Italian footballer who played as a midfielder or forward.

He was part of Italy's squad for the 1960 Olympic Football Tournament. His brother Erminio was also a footballer, arriving in Foggia the year Armando died. He died on 10 June 1967 in a car crash at the age of 47.
