= Mick Aherne =

Irish hurler and Gaelic footballer

Mick Aherne was a Gaelic football and hurling player from County Laois in Ireland.

He played for many years on the Laois senior football and hurling teams in the defence.

In 1986, he starred on the Laois senior football team that won the county's second National Football League title

A native of Ballacolla, Mick played his club hurling with Ballacolla and his club football with the O'Dempsey's club with whom he played a leading role in 1980 when the club won its second Laois Senior Football Championship title.
