= Luciano Magistrelli =

Italian footballer (1938–2011)

Luciano Magistrelli (14 February 1938 – 19 December 2011) was an Italian footballer who played as a forward. He made 125 appearances in Serie A for Atalanta, played for several other clubs, and competed at the 1960 Summer Olympics in Rome with Italy. After his playing career ended he became a coach.

== Playing career ==
Born in Bareggio, Magistrelli began playing youth football with nearby A.C. Milan. He joined Milan's senior side, but made his debut with Treviso F.B.C. in Serie D. In 1960, he joined Atalanta B.C. and would make 125 Serie A appearances for the club. He also helped the club win the 1962–63 Coppa Italia. He later also played for Triestina; while playing for Triestina, he competed at the 1960 Summer Olympics in Rome with Italy. He later also played for Alessandria, before ending his playing career back at Treviso.

== Coaching career ==
Magistrelli began his coaching career with Atalanta's youth players, then managed Treviso, Verbania, Virescit Boccaleone and SPAL. He led Virescit, a small club based in Bergamo, to promotion to Serie C1 and then to third place in their division of Serie C1 and a play-off against Reggina for promotion to Serie B, which Reggina won 2–0.

== Death ==
Magistrelli died of a heart attack in December 2011 at the age of 73.
