= Roberto Dias =

Brazilian footballer

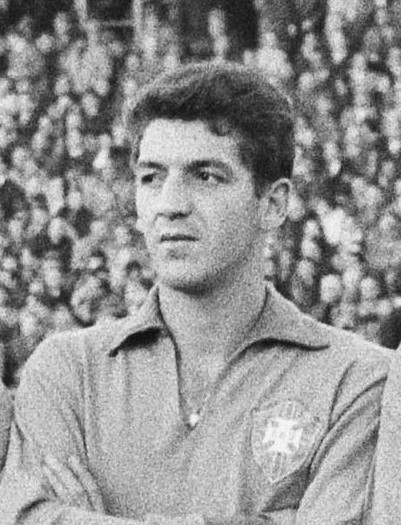
- Roberto Dias in 1963

Personal information
- Full name: Roberto Dias Branco
- Date of birth: 7 January 1943
- Place of birth: São Paulo, Brazil
- Date of death: 26 September 2007 (aged 64)
- Place of death: São Paulo, Brazil
- Positions: Defender; midfielder

Youth career
- 1959–1960: São Paulo

Senior career*
| Years | Team | Apps | (Gls) |
| 1960–1973 | São Paulo | 523 | (76) |
| 1973 | CEUB | 4 | (0) |
| 1974–1977 | Jalisco | ? | (?) |
| 1978 | Dom Bosco | 14 | (2) |
| 1979 | Nacional (São Paulo) | ? | (?) |

International career
| 1960 | Brazil Olympic | 5 | (2) |
| 1963–1968 | Brazil | 23 | (1) |
- * Club domestic league appearances and goals

Roberto Dias Branco or simply Roberto Dias (7 January 1943 in São Paulo – 26 September 2007) was a footballer with São Paulo FC in Brazil. He was considered by Pelé to be the greatest Brazilian central defender of the 1960s and 1970s. He was known for his finesse on defense—a player who did not need to show a rough side. He just knew how to cover and always seemed one step ahead of the forwards he covered—including Pelé. Pelé said that Roberto Dias was the only central defender who could truly mark him. In one game between Pelé's Santos FC and São Paulo FC in the 1967 edition of the Campeonato Paulista, which ended in a 3–3 draw, Dias, kept Pelé scoreless while scoring 2 goals in the process.

Roberto Dias was on the 1960 Olympic football team in Rome. Despite his stellar career, Dias was not given a spot on the 1966 FIFA World Cup team, when Coach Feola opted to call up an ageing Zito to the squad instead of Dias. Furthermore, in 1973, at the age of 30, he suffered a heart attack. He earned 27 caps for Brazil.

The São Paulo teams he played for were never really contenders—the board opted to spend their money in the construction of Estádio do Morumbi instead of on players. Pelé was past his prime—and the construction of Morumbi completed in 1970, São Paulo FC promptly won two Paulistas.

After many years training and working as coach for the São Paulo FC youth team, Roberto Dias suffered a fatal heart attack and died in São Paulo. In his honor, the SPFC team played with a black armband in the second game against Boca Juniors for the 2007 Sudamerica Cup.
