= Law Pak =

Taiwanese footballer (1933–2024)

- Born: 25 May 1933; British Hong Kong
- Died: 13 February 2024 (aged 90); New York, U.S.
- Citizenship: British Hong Kong (1929–1997)
- Occupations: association footballer; association football coach
- Height: 1.72 m (5 ft 8 in)
Association football career
- Position: Defender
Senior career*
Years	Team	Apps	(Gls)
1952–56	Eastern	37	(0)
1956–60	KMB	99	(1)
1960–61	Tung Wa	16	(0)
1961–62	Kwong Wah	17	(1)
1962–65	Yueng Long	66	(4)
1965–68	Eastern	55	(3)
1969	Rangers	13	(0)
1969–70	Telecom	20	(0)
1970–71	Eastern	18	(0)
1971–72	Telecom	26	(0)
1972–73	Yueng Long	3	(0)
International career
1958–1967	Republic of China (Taiwan)	53	(1)
Managerial career
- Yuen Long
- 1977–1981: Republic of China (Taiwan)
- 1975–1989: Flying Camel
- 1990–1991: Eastern
Medal record
Men's football
Representing Taiwan
AFC Asian Cup
Third place	1960 South Korea
Asian Games
Gold medal – first place	1958 Tokyo
- * Club domestic league appearances and goals

Chinese name
- Traditional Chinese: 羅北
- Simplified Chinese: 罗北
Transcriptions
Standard Mandarin
- Hanyu Pinyin: Luō Běi
- Wade–Giles: Lu Pei
Yue: Cantonese
- Jyutping: Lo4 Bak1

Law Pak (25 May 1933 – 13 February 2024) was a Hong Kong-born football coach and Republic of China (Taiwan) international footballer. However, he spent his entire playing career in the British Hong Kong. As a coach, he coached teams from Hong Kong and Taiwan; he also resided in Taiwan temporarily but in recent years followed his daughter to migrate to the United States.

In 2014, during an interview, he claimed that he, Mok Chun Wah and Lau Tim (劉添) were the only surviving gold medalists of the 1958 Asian Games football tournament.

== Death ==
Law died in New York on 13 February 2024, at the age of 90.

== Club career ==
Law was a player of KMB in the 1950s. He was also employed by the owner of the football club, Kowloon Motor Bus, as a bus station manager, according to an interview of Law by John C.W. Lee (李峻嶸). At that time the footballers were registered as amateur footballers but in fact professional, receiving income from various sources.

== International career ==
Law represented the Republic of China (Taiwan) in the 1958 Asian Games, the 1960 Summer Olympics, the 1960 AFC Asian Cup, the 1966 Asian Games and the 1968 AFC Asian Cup.

Law also played for Hong Kong League XI in 1958 Merdeka Tournament.

== Managerial career ==
Law had managed Hong Kong football clubs Yuen Long and Eastern. With Eastern, he was assisted by Koo Luam Khen who acted as coach. He also spent over 10 years in Taiwan for Flying Camel, a military sponsored club. During his career at Taiwan, he also guest coached Republic of China (Taiwan), which team played under the name "Chinese Taipei" due to the foreign relations of Taiwan as well as the People's Republic of China.

== Honours ==
Republic of China

- AFC Asian Cup: 3rd place, 1960
- Asian Games: Gold medal, 1958
