= Kwok Kam-hung =

Taiwanese footballer

Personal information
- Date of birth: 13 May 1934
- Place of birth: Hong Kong
- Date of death: 21 November 2011 (aged 77)
- Position: Defender

International career
Years	Team	Apps	(Gls)
- Republic of China
Medal record
Men's football
Representing Taiwan
Asian Games
Gold medal – first place	1958 Tokyo

Kwok Kam-hung (13 May 1934 - 21 November 2011) was a former international footballer who played for the Republic of China. He competed in the men's tournament at the 1960 Summer Olympics.

== Honours ==
=== Player ===
Republic of China

- Asian Games: Gold medal, 1958

=== Individual ===
- AFC Asian All Stars: 1965
