= John Devine (footballer, born 1935) =

Scottish footballer (1935–2020)

Personal information
- Full name: John Hunter Devine
- Date of birth: 1 December 1935
- Place of birth: Auchinloch, Scotland
- Date of death: 6 December 2020 (aged 85)
- Height: 1.86 m (6 ft 1 in)
- Position: Inside forward

Youth career
- Kirkintilloch St. Mary's

Senior career*
| Years | Team | Apps | (Gls) |
| 1953–1961 | Queen's Park | 98 | (43) |
- Hounslow Town
- Dulwich Hamlet

International career
| 1960 | Great Britain | 2 | (0) |
- * Club domestic league appearances and goals

John Hunter Devine (1 December 1935 – 6 December 2020), also known as Hunter Devine, was a Scottish amateur footballer who played as an inside forward for Queen's Park between 1953 and 1961. Devine represented Great Britain at the 1960 Summer Olympics and also played in non-League football.

== Personal life ==
In the early 1960s, Devine moved to London to work as an actuary for Scottish Amicable Building Society. Devine died on 6 December 2020, at the age of 85.

== Career statistics ==
Appearances and goals by club, season and competition
| Club | Season | League | | | National Cup | | League Cup | | Other | | Total | |
| Club | Season | Division | Apps | Goals | Apps | Goals | Apps | Goals | Apps | Goals | Apps | Goals |
|---|---|---|---|---|---|---|---|---|---|---|---|---|
| Queen's Park | 1953–54 | Scottish Division B | 6 | 0 | 0 | 0 | ― | | 0 | 0 | 6 | 0 |
| Queen's Park | 1955–56 | Scottish Division Two | 16 | 14 | 3 | 0 | 2 | 2 | 1 (Note: Appearance in Glasgow Merchants Charity Cup) | 0 | 22 | 16 |
| Queen's Park | 1956–57 | Scottish Division One | 21 | 12 | 2 | 1 | 5 | 1 | 4 (Note: 2 appearances in Glasgow Cup, 2 appearances in Glasgow Merchants Charity Cup) | 0 | 32 | 14 |
| Queen's Park | 1957–58 | Scottish Division One | 12 | 4 | 0 | 0 | 6 | 0 | 2 (Note: Appearances in Glasgow Cup) | 1 | 20 | 5 |
| Queen's Park | 1959–60 | Scottish Division Two | 27 | 13 | 5 | 0 | 4 | 2 | 2 (Note: 1 appearance in Glasgow Cup, 1 appearance in Glasgow Merchants Charity Cup) | 0 | 38 | 0 |
| Queen's Park | 1960–61 | Scottish Division Two | 16 | 0 | 0 | 0 | 0 | 0 | 0 | 0 | 16 | 0 |
| Career total | | | 98 | 43 | 10 | 1 | 17 | 5 | 9 | 1 | 134 | 50 |

== Honours ==
Queen's Park

- Scottish League Division Two: 1955–56
