= Arnold Coates =

English footballer

Personal information
- Date of birth: 24 July 1936
- Place of birth: Crook, Co. Durham, England
- Date of death: 25 February 2013 (aged 76)
- Position: Striker

Senior career*
Years	Team	Apps	(Gls)
1957–1959	Crook Town		
1959–1961	Evenwood Town		
1961–1963	Crook Town		
1963–1965	Queen of the South	48	(25)
1965–1967	Scarborough		
- Howden-le-Wear

International career
1960s	England amateur	3	(1)
- * Club domestic league appearances and goals

Arnold Coates (24 July 1936 – 25 February 2013) was an English leading amateur footballer active in the 1960s who played as a striker.

== Career ==
=== Club career ===
Coates played amateur football with Evenwood Town and Crook Town, scoring two goals in the final as they won the FA Amateur Cup in April 1962. He was also in Crook's 1959 FA Amateur Cup winning team in his first spell at the club. He turned professional with Queen of the South in 1963, scoring 25 goals in 48 appearances in the Scottish Football League over the next two seasons. Coates later returned to non-League football with Scarborough, before joining village team Howden-le-Wear.

=== International career ===
Coates was called up to the Great Britain squad for the 1960 Summer Olympics, but did not make an appearance in the tournament. He also represented the England amateur team three times, in 1960 v West Germany and Scotland whilst an Evenwood player and in 1962 v France following his return to Crook. His only goal came against Scotland.

== Later life ==
Coates moved to Nelson, Lancashire and worked in insurance.
