= Ho Ying Fun =

Hong Kong footballer

Personal information
- Date of birth: 1921
- Place of birth: British Hong Kong
- Date of death: 21 October 2012
- Place of death: Hong Kong Special Administrative Region, China
- Position: Forward

Senior career*
Years	Team	Apps	(Gls)
- Singtao

International career
194?	China		
1948	China Olympic	1	(0)
1954–1960	Republic of China		

Managerial career
- 1966: Republic of China
- 1960s: Laos
- 1973–1975: Hong Kong
Medal record
Men's football
Representing Taiwan
AFC Asian Cup
Third place	1960 South Korea
Asian Games
Gold medal – first place	1954 Manila
Gold medal – first place	1958 Tokyo
- * Club domestic league appearances and goals

Ho Ying Fun
- Traditional Chinese: 何應芬
- Simplified Chinese: 何应芬
Transcriptions
Standard Mandarin
- Hanyu Pinyin: Hé Yīngfēn

Ho Ying Fun (1921 – 21 October 2012) was a professional footballer and football manager. Born in Hong Kong, he represented Republic of China in 1948 Olympics and Republic of China (Taiwan) in 1954, 1958 Asian Games, as well as 1956 and 1960 AFC Asian Cup. Ho also represented Hong Kong League XI in Merdeka Tournament, a friendly tournament in 1957.

After retirement, he coached Republic of China (Taiwan) in 1966 Pestabola Merdeka. He also coached Laos and Hong Kong.

== Honours ==
Republic of China

- AFC Asian Cup: 3rd place, 1960
- Asian Games: Gold medal, 1954, 1958
