= Huang Suh-chuang =

Taiwanese sprinter

Personal information
- Nationality: Taiwanese
- Born: 11 September 1934 (age 91)

Sport
- Sport: Sprinting
- Event: 100 metres

Huang Suh-chuang (born 11 September 1934) is a Taiwanese sprinter. He competed in the men's 100 metres at the 1960 Summer Olympics.
