= Chow Shiu-hung =

Taiwanese footballer

Personal information
- Date of birth: 15 January 1935 (age 91)
- Place of birth: British Hong Kong
- Position: Forward

International career
Years	Team	Apps	(Gls)
- Taiwan

Chow Shiu-hung (born 15 January 1935) is a Taiwanese former footballer. He competed in the men's tournament at the 1960 Summer Olympics.
