= Yosef Goldstein =

Israeli footballer (1932–2020)

Yosef Goldstein יוסף גולדשטיין
Personal information
- Date of birth: 29 March 1932
- Place of birth: Tel Aviv, Mandatory Palestine
- Date of death: 1 November 2020 (aged 88)
- Position: Midfielder

Senior career*
Years	Team	Apps	(Gls)
- Maccabi Tel Aviv

International career
1953–1961	Israel	25	(1)
- * Club domestic league appearances and goals

Yosef Goldstein (Hebrew: יוסף גולדשטיין; 29 March 1932 – 1 November 2020) was an Israeli footballer who played as a midfielder for Maccabi Tel Aviv. He made 25 appearances for the Israel national team from 1953 to 1961.
