= Lau Kin-chung =

Taiwanese footballer (born 1932)

Personal information
- Date of birth: 29 May 1932 (age 94)
- Place of birth: Hong Kong
- Position: Goalkeeper

International career
Years	Team	Apps	(Gls)
- Taiwan
Medal record
Men's football
Representing Taiwan
Asian Games
Gold medal – first place	1958 Tokyo

Lau Kin-chung (born 29 May 1932) is a Taiwanese footballer. He competed in the men's tournament at the 1960 Summer Olympics.

== Honours ==
Republic of China

- Asian Games: Gold medal, 1958
