= Hugh Lindsay (footballer) =

English footballer (born 1938)

Personal information
- Full name: Hugh Murray Lindsay
- Date of birth: 23 August 1938 (age 88)
- Place of birth: Ickenham, England
- Position: Inside forward

Youth career
- London University
- Wealdstone

Senior career*
Years	Team	Apps	(Gls)
19??–1962	Kingstonian		
1960–1965	Southampton	2	(0)
1962–1970	Wealdstone		
1970–1973	Hampton		

International career
c.1960	England amateur		
1960	Great Britain	3	(0)

Managerial career
- Polytechnic
- * Club domestic league appearances and goals

Hugh Murray Lindsay (born 23 August 1938) is an English former amateur footballer who played as an inside-forward for Great Britain in the 1960 Summer Olympics held in Rome, as well as making two Football League appearances for Southampton in 1961, making him the last amateur player to play for Southampton.

== Football career ==
Lindsay was born in Ickenham in west London and attended St Clement Danes Grammar School before attending the University of London and then training as a teacher.

He played his club football firstly with Wealdstone before joining Kingstonian. Whilst with Kingstonian, he continued his teacher training and after having been selected for the England amateur team, was picked for the Great Britain team for the 1960 Summer Olympics. Before the start of the Olympic tournament, he was signed by Southampton of the Football League Second Division on amateur terms in July 1960.

In the Olympics, Lindsay played in all three group stage matches in which Great Britain lost 4–3 to Brazil, drew 2–2 with hosts Italy and defeated Republic of China 3–2, finishing third in the group and were thus eliminated.

Although Lindsay had signed with Southampton in the summer of 1960, his teaching training commitments prevented him from playing for any of the "Saints" teams on a regular basis; furthermore, on most Saturdays he was required to turn out for Kingstonian. Although manager Ted Bates tried his hardest to persuade him to sign as a professional, he preferred to concentrate on his profession as a teacher. Lindsay had made one appearance for the reserves in March 1961, when he scored against Norwich City, before Bates called him into the first team in place of the injured Tommy Mulgrew for a match against Leyton Orient on 3 April. In this match, Bates' tactics were rather unusual, playing winger Terry Paine at centre-forward; as a result the Saints' forward line looked "rather bewildered" and they were lucky to gain a 1–1 draw (with the equaliser coming from a "fluky" free-kick from Tommy Traynor), although match reports show that Lindsay had the "best shot" of the game. Lindsay retained his place for the next match, a 1–0 defeat to Stoke City before Brian Clifton took over the No. 10 shirt.

Lindsay continued to make occasional appearances for the reserves, with six appearances (four goals) in 1961–62 and three the following year, before disappearing from the league scene, although Southampton retained his Football League registration until 1965.

Being an amateur, Lindsay was able to continue to play for Kingstonians, before returning to Wealdstone in 1962. He remained there for eight years, before joining Hampton in 1970.

After three years with Hampton, he returned to Kingstonian as a coach, before becoming assistant manager at Hampton. He was later the manager of Polytechnic F.C. of the Southern Amateur League.

He became a lecturer at the Richmond upon Thames College and kept fit by turning out for Lensbury veterans on Sundays.
