= Kwok Yau =

Taiwanese footballer (1927–2026)

Personal information
- Date of birth: 24 October 1927
- Place of birth: Macau, China
- Date of death: 28 January 2026 (aged 98)
- Position: Forward

International career
Years	Team	Apps	(Gls)
- Taiwan
Medal record
Men's football
Representing Taiwan
AFC Asian Cup
Third place	1960 South Korea
Asian Games
Gold medal – first place	1958 Tokyo

Kwok Yau (24 October 1927 – 28 January 2026) was a Taiwanese former footballer. He competed in the men's tournament at the 1960 Summer Olympics. He died on 28 January 2026, at the age of 98.

== Honours ==
Republic of China

- AFC Asian Cup: 3rd place, 1960
- Asian Games: Gold medal, 1958
