= Paddy Hasty =

Northern Irish footballer (1934–2000)

Personal information
- Date of birth: 17 March 1934
- Place of birth: Belfast, Northern Ireland
- Date of death: August 2000 (aged 66)
- Place of death: Surrey, England
- Position: Centre forward

Senior career*
Years	Team	Apps	(Gls)
1954–1958	Tooting & Mitcham United	142	(113)
1958–1959	Leyton Orient	2	(2)
1959–1960	Queens Park Rangers	1	(0)
1960	Tooting & Mitcham United		
1960–1963	Aldershot	35	(14)
- Guildford City

International career
1956–1961	Northern Ireland Amateurs	5	(4)
1960	Great Britain	3	(2)
- * Club domestic league appearances and goals

Patrick Joseph Hasty (17 March 1934 – August 2000) was a Northern Irish footballer who represented Great Britain at the 1960 Summer Olympics. Hasty played as a centre forward for Tooting & Mitcham United, Leyton Orient, Queens Park Rangers, Aldershot and Guildford City. On debut for Tooting & Mitcham United he scored four goals against Barnet in a 7–2 win.
