= Terence Howard =

English footballer (1937–2023)

Personal information
- Date of birth: 13 September 1937
- Place of birth: London, England
- Date of death: September 2021 (aged 83)
- Position: Outside left

Senior career*
Years	Team	Apps	(Gls)
- Hendon
- Enfield
- Sutton United

International career
1960	Great Britain	1	(0)
	England Amateurs	6	
- * Club domestic league appearances and goals

Terence T. Howard (13 September 1937 – September 2021) was an English footballer who represented Great Britain at the 1960 Summer Olympics. Howard worked as a fishmonger at Billingsgate Market.

Howard died in September 2021, at the age of 83.
