= Phạm Văn Rạng =

Vietnamese footballer (1934–2008)

Personal information
- Full name: Phạm Văn Rạng
- Date of birth: 8 January 1934
- Place of birth: Mỹ Tho, French Cochinchina
- Date of death: 7 November 2008 (aged 74)
- Place of death: Ho Chi Minh City, Vietnam
- Position: Goalkeeper

Senior career*
Years	Team	Apps	(Gls)
1951–1953	Ngôi Sao Bà Chiểu		
1953–1966	Tổng Tham Mưu		
1966–?	Quan Thuế		

International career
1953	South Vietnam U20		
1953–1964	South Vietnam		

Managerial career
- 1975–1978: Tổng Cục Vật Tư
- * Club domestic league appearances and goals

Phạm Văn Rạng (8 January 1934 – 7 November 2008) was a Vietnamese footballer who played for the South Vietnam national team. Nicknamed "the all-rounder with two hands", he is considered one of the best Vietnamese goalkeeper of all time.

== Club career ==
Rạng started his career in 1951 at Ngôi Sao Bà Chiểu, before joining Tổng Tham Mưu in 1953. He remained there until 1966 to join Quan Thuế.

== International career ==
In 1953, Rạng was selected to represent South Vietnam's youth team. The same year, he was chosen to represent the South Vietnam national team. With South Vietnam, Rạng was part of their teams at the 1956 and 1960 AFC Asian Cups, as well as at the 1959 SEAP Games, where he helped his country win a gold medal.

Rạng retired from the South Vietnamese national team in 1964, but in 1966, he was invited by Lee Wai Tong to play for an Asian All-Star team against English club Fulham. While with the Asian All-Star team, he apparently saved three penalties in a match against Pelé, although that fact remains unconfirmed.

== Personal life ==
Rạng died after suffering a stroke on 7 November 2008, at the age of 74.
