= Yiu Cheuk Yin =

Hong Kong footballer

Personal information
- Date of birth: 3 July 1928
- Place of birth: British Hong Kong
- Date of death: 1 February 2008 (aged 79)
- Place of death: Hong Kong
- Position: Inside forward

Senior career*
Years	Team	Apps	(Gls)
1948–1950	Kitchee		
1950–1959	South China		
1959–1961	Tung Wah		
1961–1963	Kitchee		
1963–1965	Tung Wah		
1965–1967	Tung Sing		
1967–1968	Rangers (HKG)		
1968–1969	Yuen Long		

International career
1954–1964	Republic of China	37	(8)
Medal record
Men's football
Representing Taiwan
AFC Asian Cup
Third place	1960 South Korea
Asian Games
Gold medal – first place	1954 Manila
Gold medal – first place	1958 Tokyo
- * Club domestic league appearances and goals

Yiu Chuk Yin
- Traditional Chinese: 姚卓然
- Simplified Chinese: 姚卓然
Transcriptions
Standard Mandarin
- Hanyu Pinyin: Yáo Zhuó Rán

Yiu Cheuk Yin (or transliterated as Yiu Chuk Yin; 3 July 1928 – 1 February 2008) was a former Hong Kong footballer who represented Republic of China (Taiwan) in the Asian Games, AFC Asian Cup and in the Olympics, but spent his entire career in British Hong Kong, a colony of the British Empire.

Yiu also represented Hong Kong Chinese in a non-FIFA recognized match against Malayan Chinese in 1959 Ho Ho Cup.

Yiu, along with Mok Chun Wah and Ho Cheng Yau, was collectively known as the Three Aces of South China.

== Honours ==
Republic of China

- AFC Asian Cup: 3rd place, 1960
- Asian Games: Gold medal, 1954, 1958
