= Lau Tim =

Taiwanese footballer (born 1934)

Personal information
- Date of birth: 1 January 1934 (age 92)
- Place of birth: Hong Kong
- Position: Midfielder

International career
Years	Team	Apps	(Gls)
- Republic of China (Taiwan)
Medal record
Men's football
Representing Taiwan
AFC Asian Cup
Third place	1960 South Korea
Asian Games
Gold medal – first place	1958 Tokyo

Lau Tim (born 1 January 1934) is a Taiwanese former footballer. He competed in the men's tournament at the 1960 Summer Olympics.

== Honours ==
Republic of China

- AFC Asian Cup: 3rd place, 1960
- Asian Games: Gold medal, 1958
