= Wong Chi-keung =

Taiwanese footballer

Personal information
- Date of birth: 8 July 1936 (age 90)
- Place of birth: Canton, China
- Position: Forward

International career
Years	Team	Apps	(Gls)
- Taiwan
Medal record
Men's football
Representing Taiwan
AFC Asian Cup
Third place	1960 South Korea
Asian Games
Gold medal – first place	1958 Tokyo

Wong Chi-keung (born 8 July 1936) is a Taiwanese former footballer. He competed in the men's tournament at the 1960 Summer Olympics.

== Honours ==
=== Player ===
Republic of China

- AFC Asian Cup: 3rd place, 1960
- Asian Games: Gold medal, 1958

=== Individual ===
- Asian All Stars: 1965, 1966, 1967, 1968
