= Hong Kong Chinese official football team =

Hong Kong Chinese official football team (Chinese: 華聯 or 港華) was a football team held by the Chinese Football Association of Hong Kong, a sub-association of the Hong Kong Football Association, the Chinese Amateur Athletic Federation of Hong Kong and China National Football Association of Taiwan. It was a feeder team of China national football team (1947–1949) and later Republic of China (Taiwan) from 1949 to 1971. Some players of Hong Kong Chinese also chose to represent Hong Kong national football team instead (official match since 1954); none of the player represented China national football team.

The team participated in annual Governor's Cup, a competition that Chinese from Hong Kong against Western expatriates from Hong Kong, as well as Ho Ho Cup, a competition against Malayan Chinese. However, in 1969 edition, South Korean Huh Yoon-jung also received call-up.

The team also one of the teams to participate in friendly match against football club that visited Hong Kong, along with Hong Kong national football team and Hong Kong League XI .

The team also toured in Australia in 1953 and Asia in August 1959.

== History ==
A predecessor of the team, had against the local military team in 1933. The team also won a competition (Chinese: 麗華杯) in 1936, also against the British military teams that garrisoned in Hong Kong. At that time Hong Kong national football team (Hong Kong Football Association) was not a member of FIFA.
