= Mok Chun Wah =

Hong Kong footballer

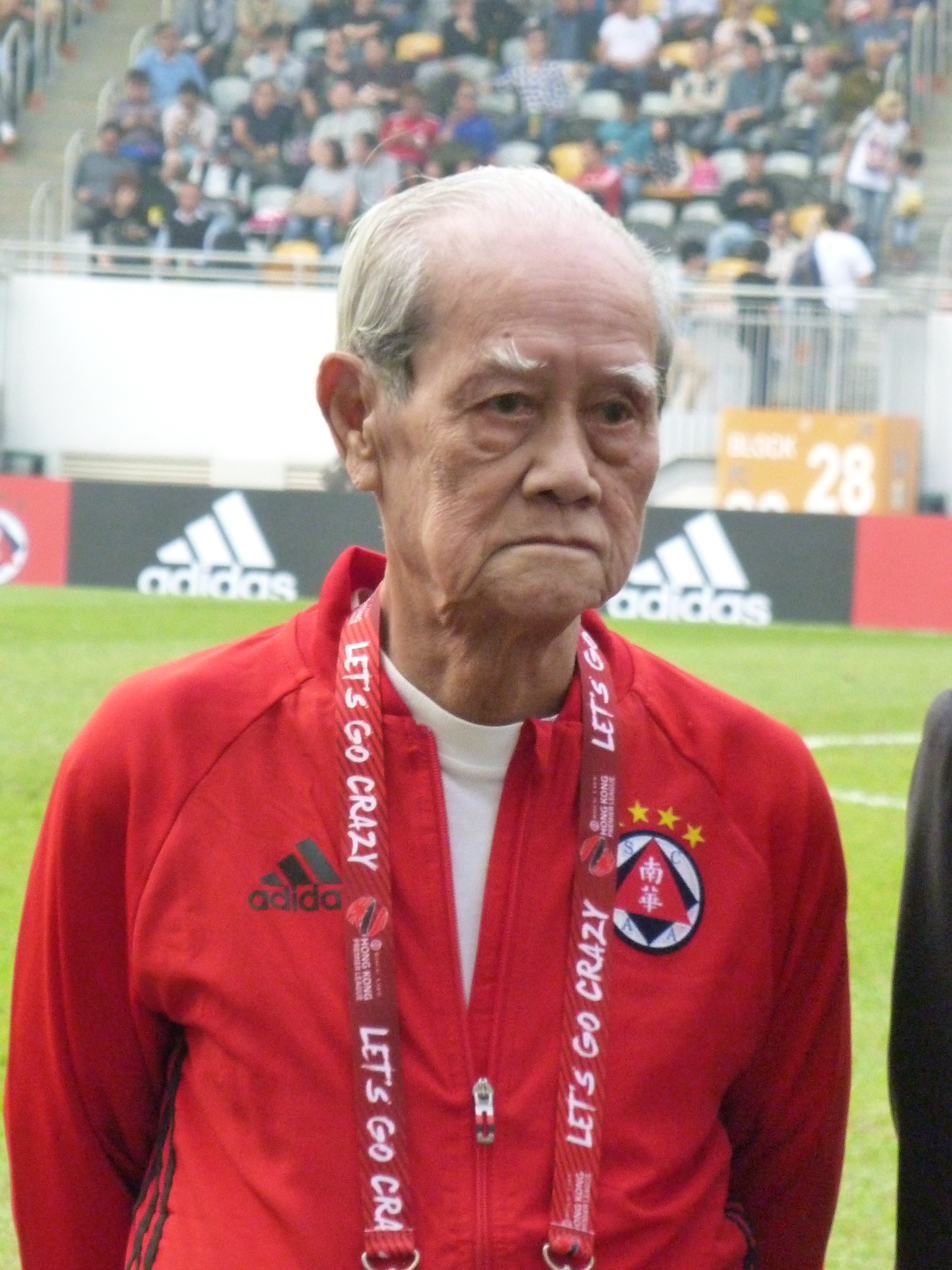
- Mok in 2016

Personal information
- Date of birth: 5 May 1929 (age 97)
- Place of birth: British Hong Kong

Senior career*
Years	Team	Apps	(Gls)
- South China

International career
- Republic of China
Medal record
Men's football
Representing Taiwan
Asian Games
Gold medal – first place	1954 Manila
Gold medal – first place	1958 Tokyo
- * Club domestic league appearances and goals

Mok Chun Wah
- Traditional Chinese: 莫振華
- Simplified Chinese: 莫振华
Transcriptions
Standard Mandarin
- Hanyu Pinyin: Mò Zhènhuá
Yue: Cantonese
- Jyutping: Mok6 Zan3 Waa4

Mok Chun Wah (also transliterated as Mok Chun Wa, born 5 May 1929) is a former professional footballer. Born in British Hong Kong to ethnic Chinese parents, Mok represented the Republic of China (Taiwan) and spending his whole professional career in the Hong Kong leagues.

== Early life ==
On May 5, 1929, Mok was born in Hong Kong.

== Club career ==
Mok was with Yiu Cheuk Yin and Ho Cheng Yau one of the "Three Aces" that formed the strikeforce of South China Athletic Association in the 1950s and 1960s.

== International career ==
He was part of the Republic of China (Taiwan) team that won the gold medals at the 1954 and 1958 Asian Games. He scored a goal in the 1960 Olympics.

Mok also represented Hong Kong Chinese in a non-FIFA recognized match against Malayan Chinese in 1959 Ho Ho Cup; in 1957, Mok also represented Hong Kong League XI in Merdeka Tournament, a friendly tournament; the team was almost entirely composed of the players of Eastern Sports Club, which was playing friendlies in the Asia-Pacific. However, Mok was the only player to fly directly from Hong Kong as a non-Eastern player. That representative team, was in fact composed for 9 Hong Kong footballers that chose to represent Republic of China (Taiwan). Mok was also selected to the 1961 edition as a member of Hong Kong League XI.

== Honours ==
Republic of China

- Asian Games: Gold medal, 1954, 1958
