= Football at the 1958 Asian Games =

- Date: 24 May – 1 June 1958
- Nations: 14

Medalists
gold medal	Republic of China
silver medal	South Korea
bronze medal	Indonesia

Football was contested as part of the programme for the 1958 Asian Games which was hosted in Tokyo, Japan from 24 May to 1 June 1958. It was the third edition of the men's football tournament at the multi-sport event organised by the Asian Games Federation.

The football tournament began with the first matches of the group stage on 25 May 1958 and ended with the gold medal match on 1 June 1958. In a repeat of the 1954 gold medal match, defending champions Taiwan and South Korea contested the final. Taiwan defeated South Korea 3–2 after extra time to win the gold medal. In the bronze medal match, Indonesia defeated India 4–1.

== Background ==
Football had been part of the Asian Games programme following the debut of the men's competition at the inaugural 1951 Asian Games in India. India had won the inaugural tournament as hosts after defeating Iran 1–0 in the gold medal match. Taiwan were the defending champions after defeating South Korea 5–2 in the gold medal match at the 1954 Asian Games.

== Format ==
In total, 14 teams took part in the competition. They were drawn into four single round robin groups – two of four teams and two of three teams. The group winners and runners-up would contest the quarter-finals. The winners of the quarter-finals would then contest the semi-finals which would decide the teams contesting the gold and bronze medal matches.

=== Participants ===
- Burma
- Hong Kong
- India
- Indonesia
- Iran
- Israel
- Japan
- Malaya
- Pakistan
- Philippines
- Singapore
- South Korea
- South Vietnam
- Republic of China

== Group stage ==
=== Group A ===
Republic of China and South Vietnam advanced to the quarter-finals.

==== Table ====
Team	Pld	W	D	L	GF	GA	GR	Pts	Qualification
Republic of China	2	2	0	0	5	2	2.500	4	Qualification for the quarter-finals
South Vietnam	2	1	1	0	7	2	3.500	3	Qualification for the quarter-finals
Pakistan	2	0	1	1	2	4	0.500	1	
Malaya	2	0	0	2	2	8	0.250	0	

==== Matches ====
25 May 1958

South Vietnam	1–1	Pakistan

25 May 1958

Republic of China	2–1	Malaya

27 May 1958

Malaya	1–6	South Vietnam
Omar 65' (pen.)		Đỗ Quang Thách 4', 26', 35'; Truong Van Duoc 40'; Luu Tan Ngoc 49'; Nguyễn Văn Tư 56'

27 May 1958

Pakistan	1–3	Republic of China
Umer 2'		Ho Ying Fun 6'; Law Kwok-tai 19'; Mok Chun Wah 64'

Korakuen Velodrome, Tokyo

=== Group B ===
Indonesia and India advanced to the quarter-finals.

==== Table ====
Team	Pld	W	D	L	GF	GA	GR	Pts	Qualification
Indonesia	2	2	0	0	6	3	2.000	4	Qualification for the quarter-finals
India	2	1	0	1	4	4	1.000	2	Qualification for the quarter-finals
Burma	2	0	0	2	4	7	0.571	0	

==== Matches ====
25 May 1958

Indonesia	4–2	Burma
Wowo Sunaryo 16', 19'; Tan Liong Houw 31'; Saari 73'		Samuel 43'; Tun Aung 60' (pen.)

26 May 1958
16:00

Burma	2–3	India
Unknown (x2)		Goswami; Balaram; Damodaran

Korakuen Velodrome, Tokyo

28 May 1958

India	1–2	Indonesia
Rahmatullah 35'		Thio Him Tjiang 11', 53'

=== Group C ===
Hong Kong and the Philippines advanced to the quarter-finals.

==== Table ====
Team	Pld	W	D	L	GF	GA	GR	Pts	Qualification
Hong Kong	2	2	0	0	6	1	6.000	4	Qualification for the quarter-finals
Philippines	2	1	0	1	2	4	0.500	2	Qualification for the quarter-finals
Japan	2	0	0	2	0	3	0.000	0	

==== Matches ====
25 May 1958

Hong Kong	4–1	Philippines

26 May 1958

Philippines	1–0	Japan
Aldeguer 55'

28 May 1958

Japan	0–2	Hong Kong
		Lau Chi Lam 26'; Chu Wing Wah 33'

=== Group D ===
South Korea and Israel advanced to the quarter-finals.

==== Table ====
Team	Pld	W	D	L	GF	GA	GR	Pts	Qualification
South Korea	2	2	0	0	7	1	7.000	4	Qualification for the quarter-finals
Israel	2	2	0	0	6	1	6.000	4	Qualification for the quarter-finals
Singapore	2	0	0	2	2	4	0.500	0	
Iran	2	0	0	2	0	9	0.000	0	

==== Matches ====
26 May 1958

South Korea	2–1	Singapore

26 May 1958

Israel	4–0	Iran

28 May 1958

Iran	0–5	South Korea

28 May 1958

Singapore	1–2	Israel

== Knockout stage ==
=== Quarter-finals ===
Republic of China, Indonesia, India and South Korea advanced to the semi-finals.

30 May 1958

Republic of China	2–0	Israel

30 May 1958

Indonesia	5–2	Philippines

30 May 1958

Hong Kong	2–5 (a.e.t.)	India
Ho Cheng Yau 35'; Chu Wing Wah 85'		Rahmatullah (x2); Goswami; Balaram; Damodaran

30 May 1958

South Korea	3–1	South Vietnam

=== Semi-finals ===
Republic of China defeated Indonesia and South Korea defeated India to advance to the gold medal match.

31 May 1958

Republic of China	1–0	Indonesia

31 May 1958

India	1–3	South Korea
Damodaran 67'		Choi Chung-min 13'; Lee Soo-nam 75'; Moon Jung-sik

National Stadium, Tokyo

== Bronze medal match ==
Indonesia defeated India to win the bronze medal.

1 June 1958

Indonesia	4–1	India
Saari 10'; Suratmo 59'; Sunaryo 60'; Phwa Sian Liong 88'		Balaram 46' (pen.)

National Stadium, Tokyo
Attendance: 46,000

== Gold medal match ==
Republic of China defeated South Korea to win the gold medal.

1 June 1958

Republic of China	3–2 (a.e.t.)	South Korea
Yiu Cheuk Yin 65'; Lau Yee 85' (pen.); Chan Fai Hung 110'		Lee Soo-nam 15'; Choi Kwang-seok 88'

National Stadium, Tokyo
