= Ikuo Matsumoto =

Japanese football player and manager

Ikuo Matsumoto 松本 育夫
Personal information
- Full name: Ikuo Matsumoto
- Date of birth: November 3, 1941 (age 84)
- Place of birth: Utsunomiya, Tochigi, Empire of Japan
- Height: 1.72 m (5 ft 7 1/2 in)
- Position: Forward

Youth career
- 1957–1959: Utsunomiya Technical High School
- 1960–1963: Waseda University

Senior career*
Years	Team	Apps	(Gls)
1964–1973	Toyo Industries	88	(31)
Total		88	(31)

International career
1966–1969	Japan	11	(1)

Managerial career
- 1976: Toyo Industries
- 1976–1979: Japan U-20
- 1985–1986: Japan U-20
- 1999: Kawasaki Frontale
- 2004–2006: Sagan Tosu
- 2010: Sagan Tosu
- 2013: Tochigi SC
Medal record
Toyo Industries
Winner	Japan Soccer League	1965
Winner	Japan Soccer League	1966
Winner	Japan Soccer League	1967
Winner	Japan Soccer League	1968
Winner	Japan Soccer League	1970
Runner-up	Japan Soccer League	1969
Winner	Emperor's Cup	1965
Winner	Emperor's Cup	1967
Winner	Emperor's Cup	1969
Runner-up	Emperor's Cup	1966
Runner-up	Emperor's Cup	1970
Representing Japan
Olympic Games
Bronze medal – third place	1968 Mexico City	Team
Asian Games
Bronze medal – third place	1966 Bangkok	Team
AFC U-19 Championship
Bronze medal – third place	1960 Malaya
- * Club domestic league appearances and goals

Ikuo Matsumoto (松本 育夫, Matsumoto Ikuo; born November 3, 1941) is a former Japanese football player and manager. He played for the Japan national team.

== Club career ==
Matsumoto was born in Utsunomiya on November 3, 1941. After graduating from high school, he joined Toyo Industries in 1964. In 1965, Toyo Industries joined the new league Japan Soccer League. The club won league championships in 1965, 1966, 1967, 1968 and 1970. The club also won the 1965, 1967, and 1969 Emperor's Cup. He retired in 1973. He played 88 games and scored 31 goals in the league. He was selected Best Eleven in 1966.

== National team career ==
In December 1966, Matsumoto was selected for Japan's national team for the 1966 Asian Games. At this competition, on December 10, he debuted against India. In 1968, he was selected Japan for the 1968 Summer Olympics in Mexico City. He played 4 matches, and Japan won the Bronze Medal. In 2018, this team was selected for the Japan Football Hall of Fame. He played 11 games and scored 1 goal for Japan until 1969.

== Coaching career ==
After retirement, Matsumoto became a manager for Toyo Industries as Kenzo Ohashi's successor in 1976. He was also named a manager for Japan U-20 national team. He managed at the 1979 World Youth Championship in Japan. In April 1999, he signed with J2 League club Kawasaki Frontale. He led the club to win the championships and was promoted to J1 League. In 2004, he signed with Sagan Tosu and managed in 3 seasons. In 2009, he was selected for the Japan Football Hall of Fame. In 2010, he became a manager for Sagan Tosu again. In September 2013, when he was 71 years old, he signed with Tochigi SC. He became the first manager for the 70s in J.League.

== National team statistics ==
Japan national team
Year	Apps	Goals
1966	4	1
1967	3	0
1968	2	0
1969	2	0
Total	11	1

== Managerial statistics ==
Team	From	To	Record				
Team	From	To	G	W	D	L	Win %
Kawasaki Frontale	1999	1999	31	24	2	5	77.42
Sagan Tosu	2004	2006	136	44	34	58	32.35
Sagan Tosu	2010	2010	36	13	12	11	36.11
Tochigi SC	2013	2013	10	7	2	1	70.00
Total			213	88	50	75	41.31

== Awards ==
- Japan Soccer League Best Eleven: 1966
- Japan Soccer League Star Ball Award: 1966
- Japan Football Hall of Fame: Inducted in 2009
