= Kazuo Imanishi =

Japanese football player and manager (1941–2026)

Kazuo Imanishi 今西 和男
Personal information
- Date of birth: January 12, 1941
- Place of birth: Hiroshima, Hiroshima Prefecture, Empire of Japan
- Date of death: April 16, 2026 (aged 85)
- Place of death: Hiroshima, Hiroshima Prefecture, Japan
- Height: 1.74 m (5 ft 9 in)
- Position: Defender

Youth career
- 1956–1958: Hiroshima Funairi High School

College career
Years	Team	Apps	(Gls)
1959–1962	Tokyo University of Education		

Senior career*
Years	Team	Apps	(Gls)
1963–1969	Toyo Industries	42	(0)
Total		42	(0)

International career
1966	Japan	3	(0)

Managerial career
- 1984–1987: Mazda
- 1988–1992: Mazda
Medal record
Toyo Industries
Winner	Japan Soccer League	1965
Winner	Japan Soccer League	1966
Winner	Japan Soccer League	1967
Winner	Japan Soccer League	1968
Runner-up	Japan Soccer League	1969
Winner	Emperor's Cup	1965
Winner	Emperor's Cup	1967
Winner	Emperor's Cup	1969
Runner-up	Emperor's Cup	1966
Representing Japan
Asian Games
Bronze medal – third place	1966 Bangkok	Team
- * Club domestic league appearances and goals

Kazuo Imanishi (今西 和男, Imanishi Kazuo; January 12, 1941 – April 16, 2026) was a Japanese football player and manager. A defender, he played for Toyo Industries and made three appearances for the Japan national team.

== Club career ==
Imanishi was born in Hiroshima on January 12, 1941. After graduating from Tokyo University of Education, he joined his local club Toyo Industries (later Mazda) in 1963. In 1965, Toyo Industries joined new league Japan Soccer League. The club won the champions for four years in a row (1965–1968). The club also won 1965, 1967 and 1969 Emperor's Cup. He retired in 1969. He played 42 games in the league. He was named as part of the Best Eleven in 1966.

== International career ==
In December 1966, Imanishi was selected for the Japan national team prior to the 1966 Asian Games. On December 10, he debuted against India. He played three games for Japan.

== Coaching career ==
After retirement, Imanishi became a manager for Mazda as Teruo Nimura's successor in 1984. This season was the first season the club was relegated to Division 2. He promoted the club to Division 1 in 1986. In 1987, he resigned as manager and was succeeded by Hans Ooft. However, the club was relegated to Division 2 again in 1988, and Imanishi returned to the club. Imanishi promoted the club to Division 1 in 1991 and he resigned in 1992. From 1994, he worked for the Japan Football Association until 2002. He also served as president at FC Gifu from 2008 to 2012.

== Death ==
Imanishi died from pneumonia in Hiroshima on April 16, 2026, at the age of 85.

== Career statistics ==
=== Club ===
Appearances and goals by club, season and competition
Club	Season	League		
Club	Season	Division	Apps	Goals
Toyo Industries	1965	JSL Division 1	9	0
Toyo Industries	1966	JSL Division 1	14	0
Toyo Industries	1967	JSL Division 1	14	0
Toyo Industries	1968	JSL Division 1	5	0
Toyo Industries	1969	JSL Division 1	0	0
Total			42	0

=== International ===
Appearances and goals by national team and year
National team	Year	Apps	Goals
Japan	1966	3	0
Total		3	0

== Honours ==
- Japan Soccer League Best Eleven: 1966
