= Takayuki Kuwata =

Japanese footballer

Takayuki Kuwata 桑田 隆幸
Personal information
- Full name: Takayuki Kuwata
- Date of birth: June 26, 1941 (age 85)
- Place of birth: Hiroshima, Hiroshima, Empire of Japan
- Position: Forward

Youth career
- 1957–1959: Hiroshima University High School
- 1961–1964: Waseda University

Senior career*
Years	Team	Apps	(Gls)
1965–1969	Toyo Industries	62	(34)
Total		62	(34)

International career
1961–1962	Japan	5	(2)
Medal record
Toyo Industries
Winner	Japan Soccer League	1965
Winner	Japan Soccer League	1966
Winner	Japan Soccer League	1967
Winner	Japan Soccer League	1968
Runner-up	Japan Soccer League	1969
Winner	Emperor's Cup	1965
Winner	Emperor's Cup	1967
Winner	Emperor's Cup	1969
Runner-up	Emperor's Cup	1966
Representing Japan
AFC U-19 Championship
Bronze medal – third place	1959 Malaya
Bronze medal – third place	1960 Malaya
- * Club domestic league appearances and goals

Takayuki Kuwata (桑田 隆幸, Kuwata Takayuki; born June 26, 1941) is a former Japanese football player. He played for Japan national team.

== Club career ==
Kuwata was born in Hiroshima on June 26, 1941. After graduating from Waseda University, he joined his local club Toyo Industries in 1965. The club won the Japan Soccer League championship for four years in a row (1965-1968). The club also won the 1965, 1967, and 1969 Emperor's Cup. He retired in 1969. He played 62 games and scored 34 goals in the league. He was selected for the Best Eleven in 1966 and 1967.

== National team career ==
On May 28, 1961, when Kuwata was a Waseda University student, he debuted and scored a goal for the Japan national team against Malaya. In 1962, he also played and scored a goal in the 1962 Asian Games. He played five games and scored two goals for Japan until 1962.

== Club statistics ==
Club performance			League	
Season	Club	League	Apps	Goals
Japan			League	
1965	Toyo Industries	JSL Division 1	14	11
1966	Toyo Industries	JSL Division 1	14	6
1967	Toyo Industries	JSL Division 1	14	9
1968	Toyo Industries	JSL Division 1	13	7
1969	Toyo Industries	JSL Division 1	7	1
Total			62	34

== National team statistics ==
Japan national team
Year	Apps	Goals
1961	2	1
1962	3	1
Total	5	2

== Awards ==
- Japan Soccer League Best Eleven: 1966, 1967
- Japan Soccer League Silver Ball (Assist Leader): 1966
