= Tsuyoshi Kunieda =

Japanese footballer

Tsuyoshi Kunieda 国枝 強
Personal information
- Full name: Tsuyoshi Kunieda
- Date of birth: September 18, 1944 (age 82)
- Place of birth: Hiroshima, Empire of Japan
- Height: 1.65 m (5 ft 5 in)
- Position: Defender

Youth career
- 1960–1962: Sanyo High School

College career
Years	Team	Apps	(Gls)
1963–1966	Chuo University		

Senior career*
Years	Team	Apps	(Gls)
1967–1972	Toyo Industries	38	(3)
Total		38	(3)

International career
1969	Japan	2	(0)
Medal record
Toyo Industries
Winner	Japan Soccer League	1967
Winner	Japan Soccer League	1968
Winner	Japan Soccer League	1970
Runner-up	Japan Soccer League	1969
Winner	Emperor's Cup	1967
Winner	Emperor's Cup	1969
Runner-up	Emperor's Cup	1970
- * Club domestic league appearances and goals

Tsuyoshi Kunieda (国枝 強, Kunieda Tsuyoshi; born September 18, 1944) is a former Japanese football player. He played for Japan national team.

== Club career ==
Kunieda was born in Hiroshima Prefecture on September 18, 1944. After graduating from Chuo University, he joined his local club, Toyo Industries, in 1967. The club won the league championship in 1967, 1968, and 1970. The club also won the 1967 and 1969 Emperor's Cups. He retired in 1972. He played 38 games and scored three goals in the league.

== National team career ==
In October 1969, Kunieda was selected by the Japan national team for the 1970 World Cup qualification. At qualification, on October 16, he debuted against Australia. On October 18, he also played against South Korea. He played two games for Japan in 1969.

== National team statistics ==
Japan national team
Year	Apps	Goals
1969	2	0
Total	2	0
