= Takeshi Ono =

Japanese footballer

Takeshi Ono 大野 毅
Personal information
- Full name: Takeshi Ono
- Date of birth: November 22, 1944 (age 81)
- Place of birth: Empire of Japan
- Position: Defender

Youth career
- 1960–1962: Johoku High School
- 1963–1966: Waseda University

Senior career*
Years	Team	Apps	(Gls)
1967–1976	Toyo Industries	145	(5)
Total		145	(5)

International career
1965–1971	Japan	3	(0)
Medal record
Toyo Industries
Winner	Japan Soccer League	1967
Winner	Japan Soccer League	1968
Winner	Japan Soccer League	1970
Runner-up	Japan Soccer League	1969
Winner	Emperor's Cup	1967
Winner	Emperor's Cup	1969
Runner-up	Emperor's Cup	1970
- * Club domestic league appearances and goals

Takeshi Ono (大野 毅, Ono Takeshi; born November 22, 1944) is a former Japanese football player. He played for Japan national team.

== Club career ==
Ono was born on November 22, 1944. After graduating from Waseda University, he joined Toyo Industries in 1967. The club won league champions 1967, 1968 and 1970. The club also won 1967 and 1969 Emperor's Cup. He retired in 1976. He played 145 games and scored 5 goals in the league.

== National team career ==
On March 25, 1965, he debuted for Japan national team against Singapore. In 1971, he was selected Japan again. He played 3 games for Japan until 1971.

== National team statistics ==
Japan national team
Year	Apps	Goals
1965	1	0
1966	0	0
1967	0	0
1968	0	0
1969	0	0
1970	0	0
1971	2	0
Total	3	0
