= Kiyoshi Tomizawa =

Japanese footballer (born 1943)

Kiyoshi Tomizawa 富沢 清司
Personal information
- Full name: Kiyoshi Tomizawa
- Date of birth: December 3, 1943 (age 82)
- Place of birth: Fujieda, Shizuoka, Empire of Japan
- Height: 1.70 m (5 ft 7 in)
- Positions: Midfielder; defender

Youth career
- Fujieda Higashi High School

Senior career*
Years	Team	Apps	(Gls)
????–1976	Nippon Steel	164	(22)
Total		164	(22)

International career
1965–1971	Japan	9	(2)
Medal record
Nippon Steel
Runner-up	Japan Soccer League	1965
Runner-up	Japan Soccer League	1966
Winner	Emperor's Cup	1964
Runner-up	Emperor's Cup	1965
Representing Japan
Olympic Games
Bronze medal – third place	1968 Mexico City	Team
- * Club domestic league appearances and goals

Kiyoshi Tomizawa (富沢 清司, Tomizawa Kiyoshi; born December 3, 1943) is a former Japanese football player. He played for Japan national team.

== Club career ==
Tomizawa was born in Fujieda on December 3, 1943. After graduating from high school, he joined Yawata Steel (later Nippon Steel). In 1965, Yawata Steel joined new league Japan Soccer League. He retired in 1976, having played 164 games and scored 22 goals in the league.

== National team career ==
In October 1964, Tomizawa was selected Japan national team for 1964 Summer Olympics in Tokyo. However, he did not compete. On March 14, 1965, he debuted for Japan national team against Hong Kong. In 1968, he was selected Japan for 1968 Summer Olympics in Mexico City. He played against Hungary in semifinal and Japan won Bronze Medal. In 2018, this team was selected Japan Football Hall of Fame. He also played at 1970 Asian Games. At 1972 Summer Olympics qualification in 1971, Japan's failure to qualify for 1972 Summer Olympics. This qualification was his last game for Japan. He played 9 games and scored 2 goals for Japan until 1965.

== National team statistics ==
Japan national team
Year	Apps	Goals
1965	2	0
1966	0	0
1967	1	0
1968	1	0
1969	0	0
1970	2	0
1971	3	2
Total	9	2
