= Teruki Miyamoto =

Japanese footballer and manager (1940–2000)

Teruki Miyamoto 宮本 輝紀
Personal information
- Full name: Teruki Miyamoto
- Date of birth: December 26, 1940
- Place of birth: Hiroshima, Hiroshima, Japan
- Date of death: February 2, 2000 (aged 59)
- Place of death: Kitakyushu, Fukuoka, Japan
- Height: 1.71 m (5 ft 7 1/2 in)
- Position: Midfielder

Youth career
- 1956–1958: Sanyo High School

Senior career*
| Years | Team | Apps | (Gls) |
| 1959–1976 | Nippon Steel | 138 | (68) |
| Total | | 138 | (68) |

International career
| 1961–1971 | Japan | 58 | (19) |

Managerial career
- 1976–1979: Nippon Steel
Medal record
Nippon Steel
| Runner-up | Japan Soccer League | 1965 |
| Runner-up | Japan Soccer League | 1966 |
| Winner | Emperor's Cup | 1964 |
| Runner-up | Emperor's Cup | 1965 |
Representing Japan
Olympic Games
| Bronze medal – third place | 1968 Mexico City | Team |
Asian Games
| Bronze medal – third place | 1966 Bangkok | Team |
AFC U-19 Championship
| Bronze medal – third place | 1959 Malaya |
- * Club domestic league appearances and goals

Teruki Miyamoto (宮本 輝紀, Miyamoto Teruki; December 26, 1940 – February 2, 2000) was a Japanese football player and manager. He played for Japan national team.

== Club career ==
Miyamoto was born in Hiroshima on December 26, 1940. After graduating from high school, he joined Yawata Steel (later Nippon Steel) in 1959. The club won the 1964 Emperor's Cup. In 1965, Yawata Steel joined new league Japan Soccer League. In 1967, he was selected the Japanese Footballer of the Year. He retired in 1976. He played 138 games and scored 68 goals in the league. He was selected in the Best Eleven for 6 years in a row (1966-1971).

== National team career ==
In June 1961, Miyamoto was selected Japan national team for 1962 World Cup qualification. At this qualification, on June 11, he debuted against South Korea. He was selected Japan for 1964 Summer Olympics in Tokyo and 1968 Summer Olympics in Mexico City. He played all matches at both Olympics and Japan won the bronze medal 1968 Olympics. In 2018, this team was selected Japan Football Hall of Fame. He also played at 1962, 1966 and 1970 Asian Games. At 1972 Summer Olympics qualification in 1971, Japan's failure to qualify for 1972 Summer Olympics. This qualification was his last game for Japan. He played 58 games and scored 19 goals for Japan until 1971.

== Coaching career ==
In 1976, when Miyamoto played for Nippon Steel, he became a playing manager. He managed until 1979.

On February 2, 2000, Miyamoto died of heart failure in Kitakyushu at the age of 59. In 2006, he was selected Japan Football Hall of Fame.

== National team statistics ==
Japan national team
| Year | Apps | Goals |
|---|---|---|
| 1961 | 5 | 3 |
| 1962 | 7 | 1 |
| 1963 | 5 | 2 |
| 1964 | 2 | 0 |
| 1965 | 4 | 1 |
| 1966 | 5 | 3 |
| 1967 | 5 | 5 |
| 1968 | 4 | 0 |
| 1969 | 3 | 2 |
| 1970 | 12 | 1 |
| 1971 | 6 | 1 |
| Total | 58 | 19 |

== Awards ==
- Japanese Footballer of the Year: 1967
- Japan Soccer League Best Eleven: 1966, 1967, 1968, 1969, 1970, 1971
- Japan Soccer League Silver Ball (Assist Leader): 1970
- Japan Football Hall of Fame: Inducted in 2006
