= Shigeo Yaegashi =

Japanese footballer and manager

Shigeo Yaegashi 八重樫 茂生
Personal information
- Full name: Shigeo Yaegashi
- Date of birth: March 24, 1933
- Place of birth: Hanamaki, Iwate, Empire of Japan
- Date of death: May 2, 2011 (aged 78)
- Place of death: Tama, Tokyo, Japan
- Height: 1.74 m (5 ft 9 in)
- Position: Midfielder

Youth career
- 1949–1951: Morioka Daiichi High School

College career
Years	Team	Apps	(Gls)
1952–1953	Chuo University		
1954–1957	Waseda University		

Senior career*
Years	Team	Apps	(Gls)
1958–1969	Furukawa Electric	51	(14)
Total		51	(14)

International career
1956–1968	Japan	45	(11)

Managerial career
- 1967: Furukawa Electric
- 1970: Japan U-20
- 1977–1981: Fujitsu
- 1985–1989: Fujitsu
Medal record
Furukawa Electric
Runner-up	Japan Soccer League	1967
Winner	Emperor's Cup	1960
Winner	Emperor's Cup	1961
Winner	Emperor's Cup	1964
Runner-up	Emperor's Cup	1962
Representing Japan
Olympic Games
Bronze medal – third place	1968 Mexico City	Team
Asian Games
Bronze medal – third place	1966 Bangkok	Team
- * Club domestic league appearances and goals

Shigeo Yaegashi (八重樫 茂生, Yaegashi Shigeo; March 24, 1933 – May 2, 2011) was a Japanese football player and manager. He played for Japan national team.

== Club career ==
Yaegashi was born in Daejeon, Japan on March 24, 1933, but raised in Hanamaki. After playing at Chuo University, he moved to Waseda University. After graduating from Waseda University, he joined Furukawa Electric in 1958. In 1963, he was selected Japanese Footballer of the Year awards. In 1965, Furukawa Electric joined new league Japan Soccer League. He retired in 1969. He played 51 games and scored 14 goals in the league. He was also selected Best Eleven 3 times (1966, 1967 and 1968).

== National team career ==
In June 1956, when Yaegashi was a Waseda University student, he was selected Japan national team for 1956 Summer Olympics qualification. At this qualification, on June 3, he debuted against South Korea. In November, he played at 1956 Summer Olympics in Melbourne. He also played at 1964 Summer Olympics in Tokyo and 1968 Summer Olympics in Mexico City. At 1968 Olympics, he played as a captain in first match against Nigeria, he was replaced for injury in the 78minuts. This match is his last match for Japan. After the match, Although he could not play, he supported Japan team and Japan won bronze medal. In 2018, this team was selected Japan Football Hall of Fame. He also played at 1958, 1962 and 1966 Asian Games. He played 45 games and scored 11 goals for Japan until 1968.

== Coaching career and post-retirement ==
In 1967, Yaegashi succeeded Ryuzo Hiraki as player-manager for Furukawa Electric. He also coached Fujitsu twice (1977–1981 and 1985–1989).

In 2005, Yaegashi's name was added to the Japan Football Hall of Fame. On May 2, 2011, he died of a stroke in Tama, Tokyo, aged 78.

== National team statistics ==
Japan national team
Year	Apps	Goals
1956	3	0
1957	0	0
1958	2	0
1959	5	0
1960	1	0
1961	7	2
1962	7	3
1963	5	4
1964	2	2
1965	4	0
1966	2	0
1967	3	0
1968	4	0
Total	45	11

== Awards ==
- Japanese Football Player of Year: 1963
- Japan Soccer League Best Eleven: 1966, 1967, 1968
- Japan Football Hall of Fame: Inducted in 2005
