= Tsukasa Hosaka =

Japanese footballer and manager

Tsukasa Hosaka 保坂 司

Personal information
- Full name: Tsukasa Hosaka
- Date of birth: March 3, 1937
- Place of birth: Kofu, Yamanashi, Empire of Japan
- Date of death: January 21, 2018 (aged 80)
- Place of death: Kofu, Yamanashi, Japan
- Height: 1.75 m (5 ft 9 in)
- Position: Goalkeeper

Youth career
- 1952–1954: Kofu Daiichi High School
- 1955–1958: Meiji University

Senior career*
Years	Team	Apps	(Gls)
1959–1968	Furukawa Electric	47	(0)
Total		47	(0)

International career
1960–1964	Japan	19	(0)

Managerial career
- 1973–1977: Kofu SC
Medal record
Furukawa Electric
Runner-up	Japan Soccer League	1967
Winner	Emperor's Cup	1960
Winner	Emperor's Cup	1961
Winner	Emperor's Cup	1964
Runner-up	Emperor's Cup	1962
- * Club domestic league appearances and goals

Tsukasa Hosaka (保坂 司, Hosaka Tsukasa; March 3, 1937 – January 21, 2018) was a former Japanese football player and manager. He played for Japan national team.

== Club career ==
Hosaka was born in Kofu on March 3, 1937. After graduating from Meiji University, he joined Furukawa Electric in 1959. He won 1960, 1961 and 1964 Emperor's Cup. In 1965, Furukawa Electric joined new league Japan Soccer League. He retired in 1968. He played 47 games in the league.

== National team career ==
In November 1960, he was selected by the Japan national team for the 1962 World Cup qualification. At this qualification, on November 6, he debuted against South Korea. In 1962, he also played at the Asian Games. He was a regular goalkeeper in the early 1960s. In 1964, he was selected by Japan for the Summer Olympics in Tokyo. However, he did not compete, because he fractured his hand just before the Olympics. Instead, he was the team's reserve goalkeeper behind Kenzo Yokoyama. He played 19 games for Japan until 1964.

== Coaching career ==
After retirement, Hosaka became a manager for his local club Kofu SC in 1973. He managed until 1977.

On January 21, 2018, Hosaka died of pneumonia in Kofu at the age of 80.

== National team statistics ==
Japan national team
Year	Apps	Goals
1960	1	0
1961	6	0
1962	6	0
1963	5	0
1964	1	0
Total	19	0
