= Mitsuo Kamata =

Japanese footballer and manager

Mitsuo Kamata 鎌田 光夫
Personal information
- Full name: Mitsuo Kamata
- Date of birth: December 16, 1937 (age 88)
- Place of birth: Ibaraki, Empire of Japan
- Height: 1.77 m (5 ft 9 1/2 in)
- Position: Defender

Youth career
- 1953–1955: Hitachi Daiichi High School

College career
Years	Team	Apps	(Gls)
1956–1959	Chuo University		

Senior career*
Years	Team	Apps	(Gls)
1960–1974	Furukawa Electric	106	(6)
Total		106	(6)

International career
1958–1969	Japan	44	(2)

Managerial career
- 1976–1978: Furukawa Electric
- 1981–1991: Cosmo Oil
Medal record
Chuo University
Winner	Emperor's Cup	1957
Furukawa Electric
Runner-up	Japan Soccer League	1967
Winner	Emperor's Cup	1960
Winner	Emperor's Cup	1961
Winner	Emperor's Cup	1964
Runner-up	Emperor's Cup	1962
Representing Japan
Olympic Games
Bronze medal – third place	1968 Mexico City	Team
- * Club domestic league appearances and goals

Mitsuo Kamata (鎌田 光夫, Kamata Mitsuo; born December 16, 1937) is a former Japanese football player and manager. He played for the Japan national team.

== Club career ==
Kamata was born in Ibaraki Prefecture on December 16, 1937. After graduating from Chuo University, he joined Furukawa Electric in 1960. He won the 1960, 1961, and 1964 Emperor's Cup. In 1965, Furukawa Electric joined the new Japan Soccer League. He retired in 1974. He played 106 games and scored 6 goals in the league. He was selected for the Best Eleven in 1967, 1968, and 1969.

== National team career ==
On December 25, 1958, when Kamata was a Chuo University student, he debuted for the Japan national team against Hong Kong. He played at the 1964 Summer Olympics in Tokyo and the 1968 Summer Olympics in Mexico City. He played in all matches at both tournaments and Japan won the bronze medal in 1968. In 2018, this team was selected for the Japan Football Hall of Fame. He also played at the 1962 Asian Games. He played 44 games and scored 2 goals for Japan until 1958.

== Coaching career ==
After retirement, Kamata became a manager for Furukawa Electric as Saburo Kawabuchi's successor in 1976 and managed until 1978. The club won the championship of the 1976 Japan Soccer League, 1976 Emperor's Cup, and 1977 JSL Cup. In 1981, he signed with the Japanese Regional Leagues club Daikyo Oil (later Cosmo Oil). He led the club to win league championship four times and promoted the club to the Japan Soccer League Division 2 in 1986. He resigned in 1991. In 2007, he was selected for the Japan Football Hall of Fame.

== Club statistics ==
Club performance			League	
Season	Club	League	Apps	Goals
Japan			League	
1965	Furukawa Electric	JSL Division 1	14	2
1966	Furukawa Electric	JSL Division 1	14	0
1967	Furukawa Electric	JSL Division 1	14	1
1968	Furukawa Electric	JSL Division 1	13	0
1969	Furukawa Electric	JSL Division 1	14	1
1970	Furukawa Electric	JSL Division 1	13	1
1971	Furukawa Electric	JSL Division 1	14	1
1972	Furukawa Electric	JSL Division 1	7	0
1973	Furukawa Electric	JSL Division 1	3	0
1974	Furukawa Electric	JSL Division 1	0	0
Total			106	6

== National team statistics ==
Japan national team
Year	Apps	Goals
1958	2	0
1959	10	0
1960	0	0
1961	7	1
1962	7	1
1963	4	0
1964	2	0
1965	3	0
1966	0	0
1967	2	0
1968	3	0
1969	4	0
Total	44	2

=== National team goals ===
#	Date	Venue	Opponent	Score	Result	Competition
1.	10 August 1961	Stadium Merdeka, Kuala Lumpur, Malaysia	South Vietnam	1–0	Won	1961 Merdeka Tournament
2.	21 September 1962	Jalan Besar Stadium, Kallang, Singapore	Singapore	2–1	Lost	Friendly
Correct as of 6 November 2016

== Awards ==
- Japan Soccer League Best Eleven: 1967, 1968, 1969
- Japan Football Hall of Fame: Inducted in 2007
