= Kenzo Ohashi =

Japanese footballer and manager

Kenzo Ohashi 大橋 謙三
Personal information
- Full name: Kenzo Ohashi
- Date of birth: April 21, 1934
- Place of birth: Hiroshima, Empire of Japan
- Date of death: December 21, 2015 (aged 81)
- Place of death: Japan
- Height: 1.63 m (5 ft 4 in)
- Position: Forward

Youth career
- Hiroshima University High School
- Waseda University

Senior career*
Years	Team	Apps	(Gls)
- Yuasa Batteries
????–1967	Toyo Industries	3	(0)
Total		3	(0)

International career
1958	Japan	1	(0)

Managerial career
- 1971–1975: Toyo Industries
Medal record
Toyo Industries
Winner	Japan Soccer League	1965
Winner	Japan Soccer League	1966
Winner	Japan Soccer League	1967
Winner	Emperor's Cup	1965
Winner	Emperor's Cup	1967
Runner-up	Emperor's Cup	1966
- * Club domestic league appearances and goals

Kenzo Ohashi (大橋 謙三, Ohashi Kenzo; April 21, 1934 – December 21, 2015) was a Japanese football player and manager. He played for Japan national team.

== Club career ==
Ohashi was born in Hiroshima Prefecture on April 21, 1934. After graduating from Waseda University, he played for Yuasa Batteries and his local club Toyo Industries. In 1965, Toyo Industries joined new league Japan Soccer League. He retired in 1967. He played 3 games and the club also won the championship for 3 years in a row (1965-1967) in the league.

== National team career ==
In May 1958, Ohashi was selected Japan national team for 1958 Asian Games. At this competition, on May 26, he debuted against Philippines.

== Coaching career ==
After retirement, in 1971, Ohashi became a manager for Toyo Industries as Yukio Shimomura successor. He managed the club until 1975.

Ohashi died on December 21, 2015, at the age of 80.

== Club statistics ==
Club performance			League	
Season	Club	League	Apps	Goals
Japan			League	
1965	Toyo Industries	JSL Division 1	3	0
1966	Toyo Industries	JSL Division 1	0	0
1967	Toyo Industries	JSL Division 1	0	0
Total			3	0

== National team statistics ==
Japan national team
Year	Apps	Goals
1958	1	0
Total	1	0
