= Nobuyuki Oishi =

Japanese footballer

Nobuyuki Oishi 大石 信幸
Personal information
- Full name: Nobuyuki Oishi
- Date of birth: September 12, 1939 (age 87)
- Place of birth: Hiroshima, Hiroshima, Empire of Japan
- Height: 1.62 m (5 ft 4 in)
- Position: Forward

Youth career
- Sanyo High School

Senior career*
Years	Team	Apps	(Gls)
????–1970	Nippon Steel	61	(21)
Total		61	(21)

International career
1964	Japan	1	(0)
Medal record
Nippon Steel
Runner-up	Japan Soccer League	1965
Runner-up	Japan Soccer League	1966
Winner	Emperor's Cup	1964
Runner-up	Emperor's Cup	1958
Runner-up	Emperor's Cup	1965
- * Club domestic league appearances and goals

Nobuyuki Oishi (大石 信幸, Oishi Nobuyuki; born September 12, 1939) is a former Japanese football player. He played for Japan national team.

== Club career ==
Oishi was born in Hiroshima on September 12, 1939. After graduating from high school, he joined Yawata Steel (later Nippon Steel). The club won 1964 Emperor's Cup. In 1965, Yawata Steel joined new league Japan Soccer League. He retired in 1970. He played 61 games and scored 21 goals in the league.

== National team career ==
On March 3, 1964, Oishi debuted for Japan national team against Singapore.

== National team statistics ==
Japan national team
Year	Apps	Goals
1964	1	0
Total	1	0
