= Kenji Tochio =

Japanese footballer

Kenji Tochio 橡尾 健次
Personal information
- Full name: Kenji Tochio
- Date of birth: May 26, 1941 (age 85)
- Place of birth: Empire of Japan
- Position: Defender

Youth career
- Fujieda Higashi High School

Senior career*
Years	Team	Apps	(Gls)
????–1970	Furukawa Electric	61	(1)
Total		61	(1)

International career
1961	Japan	2	(0)
Medal record
Furukawa Electric
Runner-up	Japan Soccer League	1967
Winner	Emperor's Cup	1960
Winner	Emperor's Cup	1961
Winner	Emperor's Cup	1964
Runner-up	Emperor's Cup	1962
- * Club domestic league appearances and goals

Kenji Tochio (橡尾 健次, Tochio Kenji; born May 26, 1941) is a former Japanese football player. He played for the Japan national team.

== Club career ==
Tochio was born on May 26, 1941. After graduating from high school, he joined Furukawa Electric SC. In 1965, Furukawa Electric joined the new Japan Soccer League. He retired in 1970. He played 61 games and scored 1 goal in the league.

== National team career ==
On May 28, 1961, he debuted for Japan national team against Malaya. He played 2 games for Japan in 1961.

== National team statistics ==
Japan national team
Year	Apps	Goals
1961	2	0
Total	2	0
