= Masakatsu Miyamoto =

Japanese footballer and manager

Masakatsu Miyamoto 宮本 征勝
- Miyamoto in 1968

Personal information
- Full name: Masakatsu Miyamoto
- Date of birth: July 4, 1938
- Place of birth: Hitachi, Ibaraki, Empire of Japan
- Date of death: May 7, 2002 (aged 63)
- Place of death: Mito, Ibaraki, Japan
- Height: 1.71 m (5 ft 7 1/2 in)
- Position: Defender

Youth career
- 1954–1956: Hitachi Daiichi High School
- 1957–1960: Waseda University

Senior career*
Years	Team	Apps	(Gls)
1961–1974	Furukawa Electric	103	(19)
Total		103	(19)

International career
1958–1971	Japan	44	(1)

Managerial career
- 1983–1989: Honda
- 1989: Japan Futsal
- 1992–1994: Kashima Antlers
- 1995: Shimizu S-Pulse
Medal record
Furukawa Electric
Runner-up	Japan Soccer League	1967
Winner	Emperor's Cup	1961
Winner	Emperor's Cup	1964
Runner-up	Emperor's Cup	1962
Representing Japan
Olympic Games
Bronze medal – third place	1968 Mexico City	Team
Asian Games
Bronze medal – third place	1966 Bangkok	Team
- * Club domestic league appearances and goals

Masakatsu Miyamoto (宮本 征勝, Miyamoto Masakatsu; July 4, 1938 – May 7, 2002) was a Japanese football player and manager. He played for Japan national team.

== Club career ==
Miyamoto was born in Hitachi on July 4, 1938. After graduating from Waseda University, he joined Furukawa Electric in 1961. He won 1961 and 1964 Emperor's Cup. In 1965, Furukawa Electric joined new league Japan Soccer League. He retired in 1974. He played 103 games and scored 19 goals in the league. He was selected Best Eleven in 1966, 1967 and 1968.

== National team career ==
On December 25, 1958, when Miyamoto was a Waseda University student, he debuted for Japan national team against Hong Kong. He was selected Japan for 1964 Summer Olympics in Tokyo and 1968 Summer Olympics in Mexico City. Although he did not play at 1964 Summer Olympics, he played 5 games at 1968 Summer Olympics and Japan won bronze medal. In 2018, this team was selected Japan Football Hall of Fame. He also played at 1962 and 1966 Asian Games. He played 44 games and scored 1 goal for Japan until 1971.

== Coaching career ==
After retirement, Miyamoto became a manager for Honda in 1983 and managed until 1989. In January 1989, he also managed for Japan national futsal team for 1989 Futsal World Championship in Netherlands. In 1992, he signed with Kashima Antlers joined new league J1 League. In 1993, he led the club to won 2nd place at J1 League and 1993. He resigned in June 1994. He also managed Shimizu S-Pulse in 1995.

On May 7, 2002, he died of pneumonia in Mito at the age of 63. In 2005, he was selected Japan Football Hall of Fame.

== Club statistics ==
Club performance			League	
Season	Club	League	Apps	Goals
Japan			League	
1965	Furukawa Electric	JSL Division 1	14	4
1966	Furukawa Electric	JSL Division 1	13	4
1967	Furukawa Electric	JSL Division 1	14	9
1968	Furukawa Electric	JSL Division 1	14	2
1969	Furukawa Electric	JSL Division 1	14	0
1970	Furukawa Electric	JSL Division 1	14	0
1971	Furukawa Electric	JSL Division 1	9	0
1972	Furukawa Electric	JSL Division 1	11	0
1973	Furukawa Electric	JSL Division 1	0	0
1974	Furukawa Electric	JSL Division 1	0	0
Total			103	19

== National team statistics ==
Japan national team
Year	Apps	Goals
1958	1	0
1959	8	0
1960	1	0
1961	6	0
1962	7	0
1963	4	0
1964	1	0
1965	2	1
1966	5	0
1967	1	0
1968	2	0
1969	2	0
1970	0	0
1971	4	0
Total	44	1

== Managerial statistics ==
Team	From	To	Record				
Team	From	To	G	W	D	L	Win %
Kashima Antlers	1993	1994	58	39	0	19	67.24
Shimizu S-Pulse	1995	1995	52	25	0	27	48.08
Total			110	64	0	46	58.18

== Honors and awards ==
=== Individual honors ===
- Japan Soccer League Best Eleven: 1966, 1967, 1968
- Japan Football Hall of Fame: Inducted in 2005

=== Team honors ===
- Emperor's Cup: 1961, 1964
