= Yukio Shimomura =

Japanese football player and manager (1932–2026)

Yukio Shimomura 下村 幸男
Personal information
- Date of birth: January 25, 1932
- Place of birth: Hiroshima, Hiroshima Prefecture, Japan
- Date of death: August 13, 2026 (aged 94)
- Position: Goalkeeper

Youth career
- 1948–1949: Shudo High School

Senior career*
Years	Team	Apps	(Gls)
1950–1961	Toyo Industries		

International career
1955	Japan	1	(0)

Managerial career
- 1964–1970: Toyo Industries
- 1972–1974: Towa Real Estate
- 1979–1980: Japan
- * Club domestic league appearances and goals

Yukio Shimomura (下村 幸男, Shimomura Yukio; January 25, 1932 – August 13, 2026) was a Japanese football player and manager. He played for and managed the Japan national team.

== Club career ==
Shimomura was born in Hiroshima on January 25, 1932. After graduating from Shudo High School, he joined his local club Toyo Industries in 1950. The club won the 2nd place at 1954 and 1957 Emperor's Cup. At 1954 Emperor's Cup, it was first Emperor's Cup finalist as a works team. He retired in 1961.

== International career ==
On October 9, 1955, Shimomura debuted for Japan national team against Burma. In 1956, he was selected by Japan for 1956 Summer Olympics in Melbourne. But did not compete, as he was the team's reserve goalkeeper behind Yoshio Furukawa.

== Coaching career ==
After retirement, Shimomura became a manager for Toyo Industries in 1964. In 1965, Toyo Industries joined new league Japan Soccer League. In 1965 season, the club won first champions in the league. He led the club through their first golden era as five-time champions of the league (1965, 1966, 1967, 1968 and 1970). He led the club to win the 1965, 1967 and 1969 Emperor's Cup. He resigned in 1970. In 1972, he signed with Towa Real Estate and was promoted to new league Japan Soccer League Division 2 from 1972. He managed the club for three seasons until 1974. In 1979, he was named manager for the Japan national team as successor to Hiroshi Ninomiya. However, at 1980 Asian Olympic Qualifying Tournaments, following Japan's failure to qualify for 1980 Summer Olympics, he resigned.

== Personal life and death ==
Shimomura was a survivor of the atomic bombing of Hiroshima in 1945. He died on August 13, 2026, at the age of 94.

== Career statistics ==
Appearances and goals by national team and year
National team	Year	Apps	Goals
Japan	1955	1	0
Total		1	0

== Honours ==
- Japan Football Hall of Fame: Inducted in 2015
