= Teruo Nimura =

Japanese footballer and manager

Teruo Nimura 二村 昭雄
Personal information
- Full name: Teruo Nimura
- Date of birth: May 2, 1943 (age 83)
- Place of birth: Kyoto, Kyoto, Empire of Japan
- Position: Midfielder

Youth career
- 1959–1961: Yamashiro High School
- 1962–1965: Waseda University

Senior career*
Years	Team	Apps	(Gls)
1966–1976	Toyo Industries	151	(16)
Total		151	(16)

International career
1970	Japan	5	(0)

Managerial career
- 1981–1983: Mazda
Medal record
Toyo Industries
Winner	Japan Soccer League	1966
Winner	Japan Soccer League	1967
Winner	Japan Soccer League	1968
Winner	Japan Soccer League	1970
Runner-up	Japan Soccer League	1969
Winner	Emperor's Cup	1967
Winner	Emperor's Cup	1969
Runner-up	Emperor's Cup	1966
Runner-up	Emperor's Cup	1970
- * Club domestic league appearances and goals

Teruo Nimura (二村 昭雄, Nimura Teruo; born May 2, 1943) is a former Japanese football player and manager. He played for Japan national team.

== Club career ==
Nimura was born in Kyoto on May 2, 1943. After graduating from Waseda University, he joined Toyo Industries in 1966. The club won Japan Soccer League champions 4 times (1966, 1967, 1968, 1970) and Emperor's Cup 2 times (1967, 1969). This was the greatest era in Toyo Industries history. He retired in 1976. He played 151 games and scored 16 goals in the league.

== National team career ==
In December 1970, Nimura was selected Japan national team for 1970 Asian Games. At this competition, on December 10, he debuted against Malaysia. He played 5 games for Japan in 1970.

== Coaching career ==
After retirement, Nimura became a manager for Mazda (former Toyo Industries) as Aritatsu Ogi successor in 1981. However, in 1983 season, the club finished at the bottom place and was relegated to Division 2 first time. He resigned end of 1983 season.

== National team statistics ==
Japan national team
Year	Apps	Goals
1970	5	0
Total	5	0
