= Masafumi Hara =

Japanese footballer (born 1943)

Masafumi Hara 原 正文
Personal information
- Full name: Masafumi Hara
- Date of birth: December 21, 1943 (age 82)
- Place of birth: Saitama, Japan
- Height: 1.79 m (5 ft 10 1/2 in)
- Position: Defender

Youth career
- Kumamoto Commercial High School

Senior career*
Years	Team	Apps	(Gls)
?–1974	Nippon Steel	96	(9)
Total		96	(9)

International career
1970	Japan	5	(0)
Medal record
Nippon Steel
Runner-up	Japan Soccer League	1965
Runner-up	Japan Soccer League	1966
Winner	Emperor's Cup	1964
Runner-up	Emperor's Cup	1965
- * Club domestic league appearances and goals

Masafumi Hara (原 正文, Hara Masafumi; born December 21, 1943) is a former Japanese football player. He played for Japan national team.

== Club career ==
Hara was born on December 21, 1943. After graduating from high school, he joined Yawata Steel (later Nippon Steel). He retired in 1974. He played 96 games and scored 9 goals in the league.

== National team career ==
On July 31, 1970, Hara debuted for Japan national team against Hong Kong. He also played in the 1970 Asian Games. He played five games for Japan in 1970.

== National team statistics ==
Japan national team
Year	Apps	Goals
1970	5	0
Total	5	0
