= Junji Kawano =

Japanese footballer

Junji Kawano 川野 淳次
Personal information
- Full name: Junji Kawano
- Date of birth: July 11, 1945 (age 81)
- Place of birth: Nakatsu, Oita, Empire of Japan
- Position: Defender

Youth career
- 1961–1963: Nakatsu Minami High School
- 1964–1967: Tokyo University of Education

Senior career*
Years	Team	Apps	(Gls)
1968–1976	Toyo Industries	90	(8)
Total		90	(8)

International career
1968–1969	Japan	2	(0)
Medal record
Toyo Industries
Winner	Japan Soccer League	1968
Winner	Japan Soccer League	1970
Runner-up	Japan Soccer League	1969
Winner	Emperor's Cup	1969
Runner-up	Emperor's Cup	1970
- * Club domestic league appearances and goals

Junji Kawano (川野 淳次, Kawano Junji; born July 11, 1945) is a former Japanese football player. He played for Japan national team.

== Club career ==
Kawano was born in Nakatsu on July 11, 1945. After graduating from Tokyo University of Education, he joined Toyo Industries in 1968. The club won the league championships in 1968 and 1970. The club also won the 1969 Emperor's Cup. He retired in 1976. He played 90 games and scored 8 goals in the league.

== National team career ==
On March 31, 1968, Kawano debuted for the Japan national team against Australia. In October 1969, he was also selected by Japan for the 1970 World Cup qualification. He played two games for Japan until 1969.

== National team statistics ==
Japan national team
Year	Apps	Goals
1968	1	0
1969	1	0
Total	2	0
