= Tadao Onishi =

Japanese footballer and manager

Tadao Onishi 大西 忠生
Personal information
- Full name: Tadao Onishi
- Date of birth: April 18, 1943
- Place of birth: Kyoto, Kyoto, Empire of Japan
- Date of death: June 29, 2006 (aged 63)
- Place of death: Yokohama, Kanagawa, Japan
- Position: Defender

Youth career
- Kyoto Murasakino High School
- 1963–1966: Kyoto University of Education

Senior career*
Years	Team	Apps	(Gls)
1967–1974	Mitsubishi Motors	83	(0)
Total		83	(0)

International career
1969	Japan	1	(0)

Managerial career
- 1981–1986: Toshiba
Medal record
Mitsubishi Motors
Winner	Japan Soccer League	1969
Winner	Japan Soccer League	1973
Runner-up	Japan Soccer League	1970
Runner-up	Japan Soccer League	1971
Runner-up	Japan Soccer League	1974
Winner	Emperor's Cup	1971
Winner	Emperor's Cup	1973
Runner-up	Emperor's Cup	1967
Runner-up	Emperor's Cup	1968
- * Club domestic league appearances and goals

Tadao Onishi (大西 忠生, Ōnishi Tadao; April 18, 1943 – June 29, 2006) was a Japanese football player and manager. He played for the Japan national team.

== Club career ==
Onishi was born in Kyoto on April 18, 1943. After graduating from Kyoto University of Education, he joined Mitsubishi Motors in 1967. The club won the league champions in 1969 and 1973. The club also won 1971 and 1973 Emperor's Cup. He retired in 1974. He played 83 games in the league.

== National team career ==
In October 1969, Onishi was selected Japan national team for 1970 World Cup qualification. At this qualification, on October 10, he debuted against Australia.

== Coaching career ==
After retirement, Onishi became a manager for Toshiba in 1981. He managed until 1985–86 season. In 2002, he signed with Thespa Kusatsu and became a general manager. From November 2005, he also served as president.

On June 29, 2006, Onishi died of lung cancer in Yokohama at the age of 63.

== Club statistics ==
Club performance			League	
Season	Club	League	Apps	Goals
Japan			League	
1967	Mitsubishi Motors	JSL Division 1	14	0
1968	Mitsubishi Motors	JSL Division 1	14	0
1969	Mitsubishi Motors	JSL Division 1	14	0
1970	Mitsubishi Motors	JSL Division 1	14	0
1971	Mitsubishi Motors	JSL Division 1	8	0
1972	Mitsubishi Motors	JSL Division 1	11	0
1973	Mitsubishi Motors	JSL Division 1	6	0
1974	Mitsubishi Motors	JSL Division 1	2	0
Total			83	0

== National team statistics ==
Japan national team
Year	Apps	Goals
1969	1	0
Total	1	0
