= Ryuzo Hiraki =

Japanese footballer and manager

Ryuzo Hiraki 平木 隆三
Personal information
- Full name: Ryuzo Hiraki
- Date of birth: October 7, 1931
- Place of birth: Sakai, Osaka, Empire of Japan
- Date of death: January 2, 2009 (aged 77)
- Place of death: Toyota, Aichi, Japan
- Position: Defender

Youth career
- 1948–1950: Kishiwada High School
- 1951–1956: Kwansei Gakuin University

Senior career*
Years	Team	Apps	(Gls)
1957	Yuasa Batteries		
1958–1966	Furukawa Electric	6	(0)
Total		6	(0)

International career
1954–1962	Japan	30	(1)

Managerial career
- 1962–1965: Furukawa Electric
- 1965: Japan U-20
- 1967–1969: Japan U-20
- 1992–1993: Nagoya Grampus Eight
Medal record
All Kwangaku
Winner	Emperor's Cup	1953
Winner	Emperor's Cup	1955
Furukawa Electric
Winner	Emperor's Cup	1960
Winner	Emperor's Cup	1961
Winner	Emperor's Cup	1964
Runner-up	Emperor's Cup	1962
- * Club domestic league appearances and goals

Ryuzo Hiraki (平木 隆三, Hiraki Ryūzō; October 7, 1931 – January 2, 2009) was a Japanese football player and manager. He played for Japan national team.

== Club career ==
Hiraki was born in Sakai on October 7, 1931. After graduating from Kwansei Gakuin University, he joined Yuasa Batteries in 1957. In 1958, he moved to Furukawa Electric. Furukawa Electric won 1960, 1961 and 1964 Emperor's Cup. In 1965, Furukawa Electric joined new league Japan Soccer League. He played 6 games in the league. He retired in 1966.

== National team career ==
In March 1954, when Hiraki was a Kwansei Gakuin University student, he was selected Japan national team for 1954 World Cup qualification. At this qualification, on March 14, he debuted against South Korea. In 1956, he was selected Japan for 1956 Summer Olympics in Melbourne. He also played at 1954, 1958 and 1962 Asian Games. In 1964, he was selected Japan as captain for 1964 Summer Olympics in Tokyo. However, he could not play for injury. After 1964 Summer Olympics, he retired from national team. He played 30 games and scored 1 goal for Japan until 1962.

== Coaching career ==
In 1962, when Hiraki played for Furukawa Electric, he became a playing manager as Ken Naganuma successor for the club and managed until 1965. He also served a coach for Japan national team and a manager for Japan U-20 national team. In 1968, he participated as a coach in 1968 Summer Olympics in Mexico City and Japan team won Bronze Medal. In 2018, this team was selected Japan Football Hall of Fame. In 1992, he signed with Nagoya Grampus Eight joined new league J.League and he managed until 1993.

In 2005, Hiraki was selected Japan Football Hall of Fame. On January 2, 2009, he died of pneumonia in Toyota at the age of 77.

== Club statistics ==
Club performance			League	
Season	Club	League	Apps	Goals
Japan			League	
1965	Furukawa Electric	JSL Division 1	6	0
1966	Furukawa Electric	JSL Division 1	0	0
Total			6	0

== National team statistics ==
Japan national team
Year	Apps	Goals
1954	3	0
1955	4	0
1956	3	0
1957	0	0
1958	4	0
1959	10	1
1960	1	0
1961	2	0
1962	3	0
Total	30	1

== Managerial statistics ==
Team	From	To	Record				
Team	From	To	G	W	D	L	Win %
Nagoya Grampus Eight	1993	1993	36	12	0	24	33.33
Total			36	12	0	24	33.33

== Honours ==
- Japan Football Hall of Fame: Inducted in 2005
