= Ryūichi Sugiyama =

Japanese footballer

Ryuichi Sugiyama 杉山 隆一
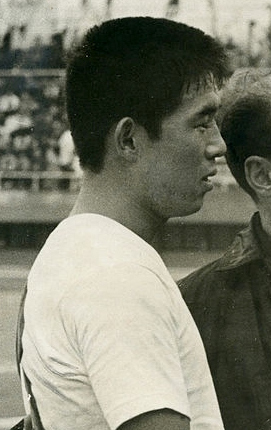
- Sugiyama at the 1964 Olympics

Personal information
- Full name: Ryuichi Sugiyama
- Date of birth: July 4, 1941 (age 85)
- Place of birth: Shizuoka, Shizuoka, Japan
- Height: 1.69 m (5 ft 6 1/2 in)
- Position: Forward

Youth career
- 1957–1960: Shimizu Higashi High School

College career
Years	Team	Apps	(Gls)
1962–1965	Meiji University		

Senior career*
Years	Team	Apps	(Gls)
1966–1973	Mitsubishi Motors	115	(41)
Total		115	(41)

International career
1961–1971	Japan	56	(15)

Managerial career
- 1974–1987: Yamaha Motors
Medal record
Mitsubishi Motors
Winner	Japan Soccer League	1969
Winner	Japan Soccer League	1973
Runner-up	Japan Soccer League	1970
Runner-up	Japan Soccer League	1971
Winner	Emperor's Cup	1971
Winner	Emperor's Cup	1973
Runner-up	Emperor's Cup	1967
Runner-up	Emperor's Cup	1968
Representing Japan
Olympic Games
Bronze medal – third place	1968 Mexico City	Team
Asian Games
Bronze medal – third place	1966 Bangkok	Team
Representing Japan
AFC U-19 Championship
Bronze medal – third place	1959 Malaya
Bronze medal – third place	1960 Malaya
- * Club domestic league appearances and goals

Ryuichi Sugiyama (杉山 隆一, Sugiyama Ryūichi; born July 4, 1941) is a Japanese former professional football player and manager. He played for the Japan national team.

== Club career ==
Sugiyama was born in Shizuoka. After graduating from Meiji University, he joined Japan Soccer League club Mitsubishi Motors in 1966. The club won the champion in 1969 and 1973. The club also won 1971 and 1973 Emperor's Cup. He retired in 1973. In his 8 seasons, he played all matches except one game in 1970 season. He was selected in the Best Eleven in every single one of these seasons. He was also selected Japanese Footballer of the Year 3 times (1964, 1969 and 1973).

== National team career ==
On May 28, 1961, during Rōnin for university, Sugiyama debuted for Japan national team against Malaya. He played at 1964 Summer Olympics in Tokyo and 1968 Summer Olympics in Mexico City. At 1964 Summer Olympics, he played 3 games and scored 2 goals against Argentina and Ghana. At 1968 Summer Olympics, he played 6 matches and assisted 5 goals and Japan won bronze medal. In 2018, this team was selected Japan Football Hall of Fame. He also played at 1962, 1966 and 1970 Asian Games. At 1972 Summer Olympics qualification in 1971, Japan's failure to qualify for 1972 Summer Olympics. This qualification was his last game for Japan. He played 56 games and scored 15 goals for Japan until 1971.

== Coaching career ==
After retirement, Sugiyama became a manager for Yamaha Motors in 1974. He led the club to the Japan Soccer League Division 1. He is their longest-serving manager, having led the club from 1974 to 1987.

In 2005, Sugiyama was selected Japan Football Hall of Fame.

== Club statistics ==
Club performance			League	
Season	Club	League	Apps	Goals
Japan			League	
1966	Mitsubishi Motors	JSL Division 1	14	11
1967	Mitsubishi Motors	JSL Division 1	14	8
1968	Mitsubishi Motors	JSL Division 1	14	4
1969	Mitsubishi Motors	JSL Division 1	14	1
1970	Mitsubishi Motors	JSL Division 1	13	4
1971	Mitsubishi Motors	JSL Division 1	14	4
1972	Mitsubishi Motors	JSL Division 1	14	3
1973	Mitsubishi Motors	JSL Division 1	18	6
Total			115	41

== National team statistics ==
Japan national team
Year	Apps	Goals
1961	3	0
1962	6	0
1963	5	1
1964	2	1
1965	4	3
1966	6	2
1967	5	4
1968	4	1
1969	4	0
1970	11	1
1971	6	2
Total	56	15

=== National team goals ===
#	Date	Venue	Opponent	Score	Result	Competition
1.	8 August 1963	Stadium Merdeka, Kuala Lumpur, Malaysia	Malaysia	4–3	Won	1963 Merdeka Tournament
--	14 October 1964	Komazawa Stadium, Tokyo, Japan	Argentina U23	3–2	Won	1964 Summer Olympics
2.	16 October 1964	Komazawa Stadium, Tokyo, Japan	Ghana	2–3	Lost	1964 Summer Olympics
3.	25 March 1965	Jalan Besar Stadium, Kallang, Singapore	Singapore	1–4	Won	Friendly
4.	25 March 1965	Jalan Besar Stadium, Kallang, Singapore	Singapore	1–4	Won	Friendly
5.	25 March 1965	Jalan Besar Stadium, Kallang, Singapore	Singapore	1–4	Won	Friendly
6.	11 December 1966	National Stadium, Bangkok, Thailand	Iran	3–1	Won	Friendly
7.	16 December 1966	National Stadium, Bangkok, Thailand	Singapore	5–1	Won	Friendly
8.	27 September 1967	National Olympic Stadium, Tokyo, Japan	Philippines	15–0	Won	1968 Summer Olympics qual.
9.	27 September 1967	National Olympic Stadium, Tokyo, Japan	Philippines	15–0	Won	1968 Summer Olympics qual.
10.	7 October 1967	National Olympic Stadium, Tokyo, Japan	South Korea	3–3	Draw	1968 Summer Olympics qual.
11.	10 October 1967	National Olympic Stadium, Tokyo, Japan	South Vietnam	1–0	Won	1968 Summer Olympics qual.
12.	4 April 1968	Adelaide, Australia	Australia	3–1	Won	Friendly
13.	10 August 1970	Stadium Merdeka, Kuala Lumpur, Malaysia	Singapore	4–0	Won	1970 Merdeka Tournament
14.	13 August 1971	Laugardalsvöllur, Reykjavík, Iceland	Iceland	0–2	Won	Friendly
15.	13 August 1971	Laugardalsvöllur, Reykjavík, Iceland	Iceland	0–2	Won	Friendly
Correct as of 6 November 2016 Argentina U-23 match is unofficial for JFA

== Awards ==
- Japanese Football Player of the Year: 1964, 1969, 1973
- Japan Soccer League Best Eleven: 1966, 1967, 1968, 1969, 1970, 1971, 1972, 1973
- Japan Soccer League Silver Ball (Assist Leader): 1968, 1969, 1971
- Asian All Stars: 1967, 1968
- Japan Football Hall of Fame: Inducted in 2005
