= List of international goals scored by Kunishige Kamamoto =

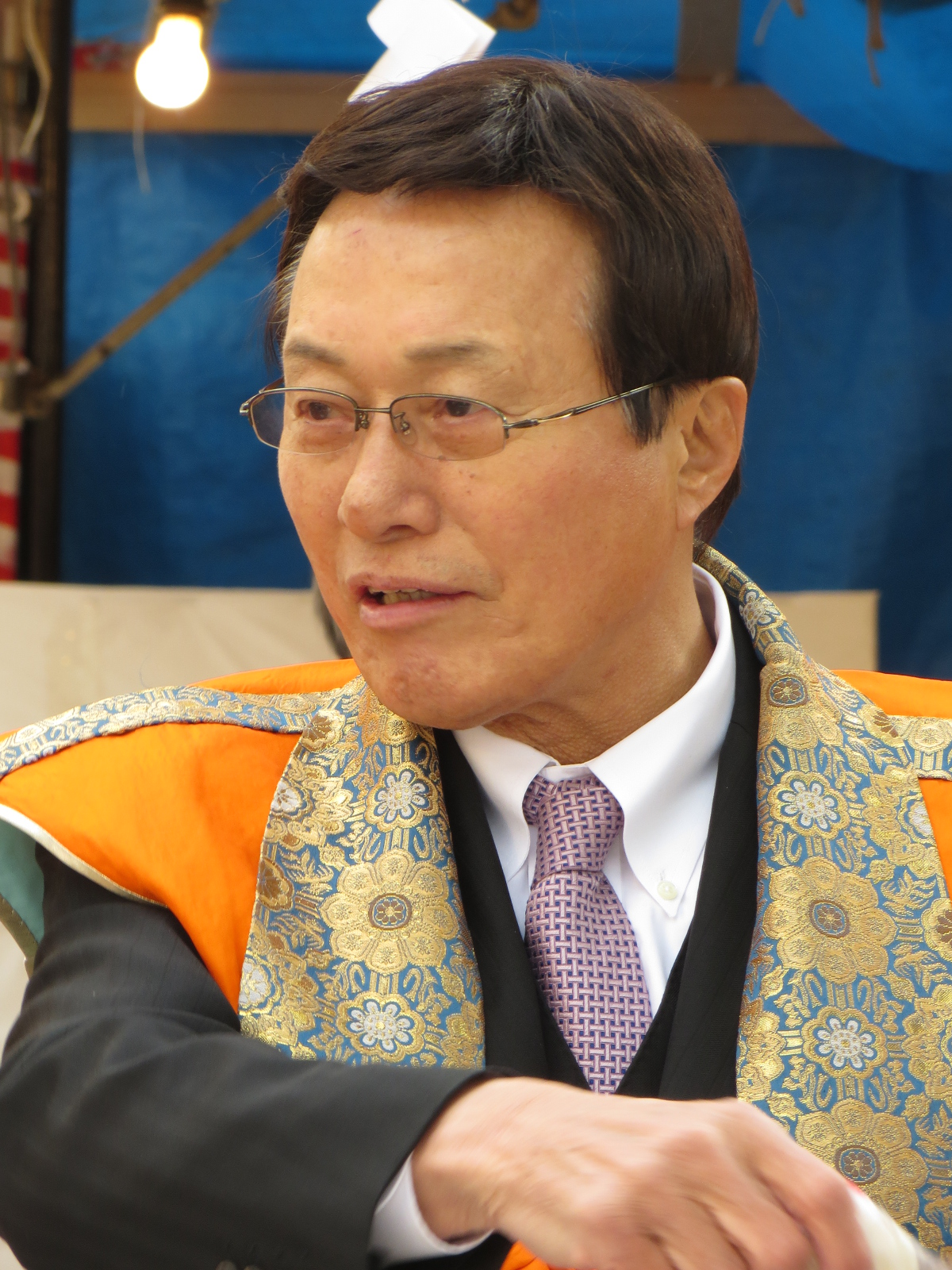
Kamamoto scored 75 international goals after making his debut for Japan in 1964

Kunishige Kamamoto was a Japanese football player who won the bronze medal with the Japan national team at the 1968 Summer Olympics in Mexico City, finishing as the tournament's top scorer with seven goals, and is the all-time leading goalscorer for Japan.

On 3 March 1964, when Kamamoto was a Waseda University student, he debuted and scored a goal for the Japan national team against the Singapore national football team. In October, he was selected by Japan for the 1964 Summer Olympics in Tokyo. He played in all matches and scored one goal.

In 1968, Kamamoto was also selected by Japan for the 1968 Summer Olympics in Mexico City, where Japan won the bronze medal and Kamamoto was the top scorer. He played in all matches for his country and scored seven goals. In 2018, this team was inducted to the Japan Football Hall of Fame.

Kamamoto played at the Football at the 1966 Asian Games. In the 1970s, after many Olympic players left the national team, he continued being selected. He played at the 1970 and 1974 Asian Games. He retired from the national team in 1977, having played in 76 matches and having scored 75 goals. Kamamoto, however, has been recognized with 80 goals in 84 appearances from the Japan Football Association, and previously as well by FIFA, but he isn't mentioned with this tally in their latest publications.

== Goals ==
Japan scores listed first.

| No. | Date | Venue | Opponent | Result | Competition |
|---|---|---|---|---|---|
| 1 | 3 March 1964 | Singapore | Singapore | 2–1 | Friendly |
| 2 | 14 March 1965 | Hong Kong | Hong Kong | 2–1 | Friendly |
| 3 | 14 March 1965 | Hong Kong | Hong Kong | 2–1 | Friendly |
| 4 | 22 March 1965 | Rangoon, Burma | Burma | 1–1 | Friendly |
| 5 | 11 December 1966 | Chulalongkorn University Stadium, Bangkok, Thailand | Iran | 3–1 | 1966 Asian Games |
| 6 | 14 December 1966 | Chulalongkorn University Stadium, Bangkok, Thailand | Malaysia | 1–0 | 1966 Asian Games |
| 7 | 16 December 1966 | Chulalongkorn University Stadium, Bangkok, Thailand | Singapore | 5–1 | 1966 Asian Games |
| 8 | 16 December 1966 | Chulalongkorn University Stadium, Bangkok, Thailand | Singapore | 5–1 | 1966 Asian Games |
| 9 | 17 December 1966 | Chulalongkorn University Stadium, Bangkok, Thailand | Thailand | 5–1 | 1966 Asian Games |
| 10 | 19 December 1966 | Chulalongkorn University Stadium, Bangkok, Thailand | Singapore | 2–0 | 1966 Asian Games |
| 11 | 27 September 1967 | Tokyo National Stadium, Tokyo, Japan | Philippines | 15–0 | 1968 Summer Olympics qualifiers |
| 12 | 27 September 1967 | Tokyo National Stadium, Tokyo, Japan | Philippines | 15–0 | 1968 Summer Olympics qualifiers |
| 13 | 27 September 1967 | Tokyo National Stadium, Tokyo, Japan | Philippines | 15–0 | 1968 Summer Olympics qualifiers |
| 14 | 27 September 1967 | Tokyo National Stadium, Tokyo, Japan | Philippines | 15–0 | 1968 Summer Olympics qualifiers |
| 15 | 27 September 1967 | Tokyo National Stadium, Tokyo, Japan | Philippines | 15–0 | 1968 Summer Olympics qualifiers |
| 16 | 27 September 1967 | Tokyo National Stadium, Tokyo, Japan | Philippines | 15–0 | 1968 Summer Olympics qualifiers |
| 17 | 30 September 1967 | Tokyo National Stadium, Tokyo, Japan | Taiwan | 4–0 | 1968 Summer Olympics qualifiers |
| 18 | 30 September 1967 | Tokyo National Stadium, Tokyo, Japan | Taiwan | 4–0 | 1968 Summer Olympics qualifiers |
| 19 | 30 September 1967 | Tokyo National Stadium, Tokyo, Japan | Taiwan | 4–0 | 1968 Summer Olympics qualifiers |
| 20 | 3 October 1967 | Tokyo National Stadium, Tokyo, Japan | Lebanon | 3–1 | 1968 Summer Olympics qualifiers |
| 21 | 7 October 1967 | Tokyo National Stadium, Tokyo, Japan | South Korea | 3–3 | 1968 Summer Olympics qualifiers |
| 22 | 30 March 1968 | Sydney, Australia | Australia | 2–2 | Friendly |
| 23 | 30 March 1968 | Sydney, Australia | Australia | 2–2 | Friendly |
| 24 | 4 April 1968 | Adelaide, Australia | Australia | 3–1 | Friendly |
| 25 | 4 April 1968 | Adelaide, Australia | Australia | 3–1 | Friendly |
| 26 | 14 October 1968 | Estadio Cuauhtémoc, Puebla, Mexico | Nigeria | 3–0 | 1968 Summer Olympics |
| 27 | 14 October 1968 | Estadio Cuauhtémoc, Puebla, Mexico | Nigeria | 3–0 | 1968 Summer Olympics |
| 28 | 14 October 1968 | Estadio Cuauhtémoc, Puebla, Mexico | Nigeria | 3–0 | 1968 Summer Olympics |
| 29 | 10 December 1970 | Bangkok, Thailand | Malaysia | 1–0 | 1970 Asian Games |
| 30 | 16 December 1970 | Bangkok, Thailand | Indonesia | 2–1 | 1970 Asian Games |
| 31 | 16 December 1970 | Bangkok, Thailand | Indonesia | 2–1 | 1970 Asian Games |
| 32 | 28 July 1971 | Idrætsparken, Copenhagen, Denmark | Denmark | 2–3 | Friendly |
| 33 | 28 July 1971 | Idrætsparken, Copenhagen, Denmark | Denmark | 2–3 | Friendly |
| 34 | 27 September 1971 | Seoul, South Korea | Philippines | 8–1 | 1972 Summer Olympics qualifiers |
| 35 | 27 September 1971 | Seoul, South Korea | Philippines | 8–1 | 1972 Summer Olympics qualifiers |
| 36 | 27 September 1971 | Seoul, South Korea | Philippines | 8–1 | 1972 Summer Olympics qualifiers |
| 37 | 29 September 1971 | Seoul, South Korea | Taiwan | 5–1 | 1972 Summer Olympics qualifiers |
| 38 | 29 September 1971 | Seoul, South Korea | Taiwan | 5–1 | 1972 Summer Olympics qualifiers |
| 39 | 29 September 1971 | Seoul, South Korea | Taiwan | 5–1 | 1972 Summer Olympics qualifiers |
| 40 | 12 July 1972 | Merdeka Stadium, Kuala Lumpur, Malaysia | Khmer Republic | 4–1 | 1972 Merdeka Tournament |
| 41 | 12 July 1972 | Merdeka Stadium, Kuala Lumpur, Malaysia | Khmer Republic | 4–1 | 1972 Merdeka Tournament |
| 42 | 12 July 1972 | Merdeka Stadium, Kuala Lumpur, Malaysia | Khmer Republic | 4–1 | 1972 Merdeka Tournament |
| 43 | 12 July 1972 | Merdeka Stadium, Kuala Lumpur, Malaysia | Khmer Republic | 4–1 | 1972 Merdeka Tournament |
| 44 | 16 July 1972 | Perak Stadium, Ipoh, Malaysia | Sri Lanka | 5–0 | 1972 Merdeka Tournament |
| 45 | 16 July 1972 | Perak Stadium, Ipoh, Malaysia | Sri Lanka | 5–0 | 1972 Merdeka Tournament |
| 46 | 16 July 1972 | Perak Stadium, Ipoh, Malaysia | Sri Lanka | 5–0 | 1972 Merdeka Tournament |
| 47 | 16 July 1972 | Perak Stadium, Ipoh, Malaysia | Sri Lanka | 5–0 | 1972 Merdeka Tournament |
| 48 | 16 July 1972 | Perak Stadium, Ipoh, Malaysia | Sri Lanka | 5–0 | 1972 Merdeka Tournament |
| 49 | 18 July 1972 | Merdeka Stadium, Kuala Lumpur, Malaysia | Philippines | 5–1 | 1972 Merdeka Tournament |
| 50 | 22 July 1972 | Merdeka Stadium, Kuala Lumpur, Malaysia | Malaysia | 1–3 | 1972 Merdeka Tournament |
| 51 | 4 August 1972 | Singapore | Philippines | 4–1 | Pesta Sukan Tournament |
| 52 | 4 August 1972 | Singapore | Philippines | 4–1 | Pesta Sukan Tournament |
| 53 | 14 September 1972 | National Olympic Stadium, Tokyo, Japan | South Korea | 2–2 | Japan-Korea Annual Match |
| 54 | 14 September 1972 | National Olympic Stadium, Tokyo, Japan | South Korea | 2–2 | Japan-Korea Annual Match |
| 55 | 20 May 1973 | Dongdaemun Stadium, Seoul, South Korea | South Vietnam | 4–0 | 1974 FIFA World Cup qualification |
| 56 | 20 May 1973 | Dongdaemun Stadium, Seoul, South Korea | South Vietnam | 4–0 | 1974 FIFA World Cup qualification |
| 57 | 3 September 1974 | Amjadieh Stadium, Tehran, Iran | Philippines | 4–0 | 1974 Asian Games |
| 58 | 3 September 1974 | Amjadieh Stadium, Tehran, Iran | Philippines | 4–0 | 1974 Asian Games |
| 59 | 3 September 1974 | Amjadieh Stadium, Tehran, Iran | Philippines | 4–0 | 1974 Asian Games |
| 60 | 28 September 1974 | National Olympic Stadium, Tokyo, Japan | South Korea | 4–1 | Japan-Korea Annual Match |
| 61 | 28 September 1974 | National Olympic Stadium, Tokyo, Japan | South Korea | 4–1 | Japan-Korea Annual Match |
| 62 | 4 August 1975 | Merdeka Stadium, Kuala Lumpur, Malaysia | Bangladesh | 3–0 | 1975 Merdeka Tournament |
| 63 | 4 August 1975 | Merdeka Stadium, Kuala Lumpur, Malaysia | Bangladesh | 3–0 | 1975 Merdeka Tournament |
| 64 | 7 August 1975 | Merdeka Stadium, Kuala Lumpur, Malaysia | Indonesia | 4–1 | 1975 Merdeka Tournament |
| 65 | 7 August 1975 | Merdeka Stadium, Kuala Lumpur, Malaysia | Indonesia | 4–1 | 1975 Merdeka Tournament |
| 66 | 14 August 1975 | Merdeka Stadium, Kuala Lumpur, Malaysia | Burma | 2–0 | 1975 Merdeka Tournament |
| 67 | 25 January 1976 | National Olympic Stadium, Tokyo, Japan | Bulgaria | 1–3 | Asahi International Soccer Tournament |
| 68 | 27 March 1976 | Seoul, South Korea | South Korea | 2–2 | 1976 Summer Olympics qualifiers |
| 69 | 27 March 1976 | Seoul, South Korea | South Korea | 2–2 | 1976 Summer Olympics qualifiers |
| 70 | 8 August 1976 | Merdeka Stadium, Kuala Lumpur, Malaysia | India | 5–1 | 1976 Merdeka Tournament |
| 71 | 10 August 1976 | Merdeka Stadium, Kuala Lumpur, Malaysia | Indonesia | 6–0 | 1976 Merdeka Tournament |
| 72 | 13 August 1976 | Merdeka Stadium, Kuala Lumpur, Malaysia | Burma | 2–2 | 1976 Merdeka Tournament |
| 73 | 16 August 1976 | Merdeka Stadium, Kuala Lumpur, Malaysia | Thailand | 2–2 | 1976 Merdeka Tournament |
| 74 | 16 August 1976 | Merdeka Stadium, Kuala Lumpur, Malaysia | Thailand | 2–2 | 1976 Merdeka Tournament |
| 75 | 20 August 1976 | Merdeka Stadium, Kuala Lumpur, Malaysia | Malaysia | 2–2 | 1976 Merdeka Tournament |

== Hat-tricks ==
| No. | Date | Venue | Opponent | Goals | Result | Competition |
|---|---|---|---|---|---|---|
| 1 | 27 September 1967 | Tokyo National Stadium, Tokyo, Japan | Philippines | 6 – (29', 32', 40', 62', 86', 90') | 15–0 | 1968 Summer Olympics qualifiers |
| 2 | 30 September 1967 | Tokyo National Stadium, Tokyo, Japan | Taiwan | 3 – (50', 57', 76') | 4–0 | 1968 Summer Olympics qualifiers |
| 3 | 14 October 1968 | Estadio Cuauhtémoc, Puebla, Mexico | Nigeria | 3 – (44', 88', 90') | 3–0 | 1968 Summer Olympics |
| 4 | 27 September 1971 | Seoul, South Korea | Philippines | 3 – (30', 32', 86') | 8–1 | 1972 Summer Olympics qualifiers |
| 5 | 29 September 1971 | Seoul, South Korea | Taiwan | 3 – (57', 70', 84') | 5–1 | 1972 Summer Olympics qualifiers |
| 6 | 12 July 1972 | Merdeka Stadium, Kuala Lumpur, Malaysia | Khmer Republic | 4 – (26', 65', 73') | 4–1 | 1972 Merdeka Tournament |
| 7 | 16 July 1972 | Perak Stadium, Ipoh, Malaysia | Sri Lanka | 5 – (13', 27', 30', 78', 90') | 5–0 | 1972 Merdeka Tournament |
| 8 | 3 September 1974 | Amjadieh Stadium, Tehran, Iran | Philippines | 3 – (23', 59', 67') | 4–0 | 1974 Asian Games |

== Statistics ==
Goals by year
| National team | Year | Apps | Goals |
|---|---|---|---|
| Japan | 1964 | 2 | 1 |
| Japan | 1965 | 3 | 3 |
| Japan | 1966 | 7 | 6 |
| Japan | 1967 | 5 | 11 |
| Japan | 1968 | 4 | 7 |
| Japan | 1969 | 0 | 0 |
| Japan | 1970 | 6 | 3 |
| Japan | 1971 | 6 | 8 |
| Japan | 1972 | 8 | 15 |
| Japan | 1973 | 3 | 2 |
| Japan | 1974 | 5 | 5 |
| Japan | 1975 | 7 | 5 |
| Japan | 1976 | 16 | 9 |
| Japan | 1977 | 4 | 0 |
| Total | | 76 | 75 |

Goals by competition
| Competition | Goals |
|---|---|
| FIFA World Cup qualification | 2 |
| Summer Olympics | 3 |
| Summer Olympics qualifiers | 19 |
| Asian Games | 12 |
| Friendlies (Note: Including international friendly tournaments such as the Merdeka Tournament, Asahi International Soccer Tournament, Pesta Sukan Tournament and Japan–Korea Annual Match.) | 39 |
| Total | 75 |

Goals by opponent
| Opponent | Goals |
|---|---|
| Philippines | 15 |
| South Korea | 7 |
| Taiwan | 6 |
| Indonesia | 5 |
| Sri Lanka | 5 |
| Australia | 4 |
| Khmer Republic | 4 |
| Malaysia | 4 |
| Singapore | 4 |
| Burma | 3 |
| Nigeria | 3 |
| Thailand | 3 |
| Bangladesh | 2 |
| Denmark | 2 |
| Hong Kong | 2 |
| South Vietnam | 2 |
| Bulgaria | 1 |
| India | 1 |
| Iran | 1 |
| Lebanon | 1 |
| Total | 75 |

== See also ==
- List of top international men's football goalscorers by country
- List of men's footballers with 50 or more international goals
