= Seiichi Sakiya =

Japanese footballer

Seiichi Sakiya 崎谷 誠一
Personal information
- Full name: Seiichi Sakiya
- Date of birth: December 1, 1950 (age 75)
- Place of birth: Hiroshima, Hiroshima, Japan
- Height: 1.74 m (5 ft 8 1/2 in)
- Position: Forward

Youth career
- 1966–1968: Sanyo High School

Senior career*
Years	Team	Apps	(Gls)
1969–1981	Nippon Steel	193	(48)
Total		193	(48)

International career
1971–1972	Japan	3	(0)
- * Club domestic league appearances and goals

Seiichi Sakiya (崎谷 誠一, Sakiya Seiichi; born December 1, 1950) is a former Japanese football player. He played for Japan national team.

== Club career ==
Sakiya was born in Hiroshima on December 1, 1950. After graduating from high school, he joined Yawata Steel (later Nippon Steel) in 1969. He retired in 1981. He played 193 games and scored 48 goals in the league.

== National team career ==
In September 1971, Sakiya was selected Japan national team for 1972 Summer Olympics qualification. At this qualification, on September 27, he debuted against Philippines. He played 3 games for Japan until 1972.

== National team statistics ==
Japan national team
Year	Apps	Goals
1971	2	0
1972	1	0
Total	3	0

== Awards ==
- Japan Soccer League Fighting Spirit: 1969
