= Kunishige Kamamoto =

Japanese footballer and politician (1944–2025)

- 釜本 邦茂
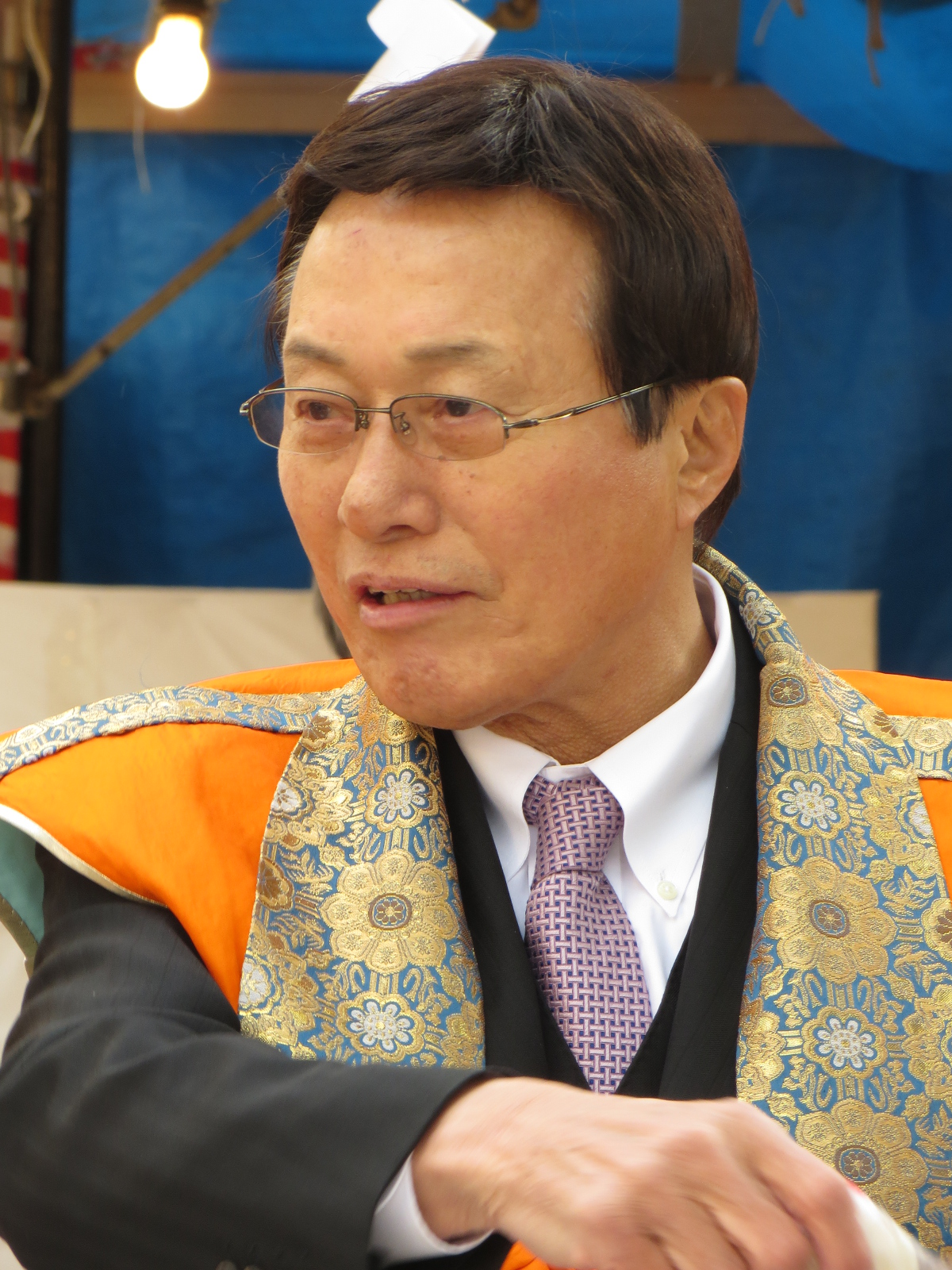
- Kamamoto in 2014

Member of the House of Councillors
- In office 23 July 1995 – 22 July 2001
- Constituency: National PR

Personal details
- Born: 15 April 1944 Ukyō, Kyoto, Japan
- Died: 10 August 2025 (aged 81) Osaka, Japan
- Party: Liberal Democratic
- Education: Waseda University
Association football career
- Height: 1.79 m (5 ft 10 1/2 in)
- Position: Forward
Youth career
- 1960–1962: Yamashiro High School
College career
Years	Team	Apps	(Gls)
1963–1966	Waseda University		
Senior career*
Years	Team	Apps	(Gls)
1967–1984	Yanmar Diesel	251	(202)
Total		251	(202)
International career
1964–1977	Japan	76	(75)
1964	Japan U23	10	(8)
Managerial career
- 1978–1984: Yanmar Diesel
- 1991–1994: Gamba Osaka
- 2009–2010: Fujieda MYFC
Medal record
Representing Japan
Olympic Games
Bronze medal – third place	1968 Mexico City	Team
Asian Games
Bronze medal – third place	1966 Bangkok	Team
- * Club domestic league appearances and goals

Kunishige Kamamoto (釜本 邦茂, Kamamoto Kunishige; 15 April 1944 – 10 August 2025) was a Japanese football player, manager, and politician. He won the bronze medal with the Japan national team at the 1968 Summer Olympics in Mexico City, finishing as the tournament's top scorer with seven goals, and is the all-time leading goalscorer for Japan.

Kamamoto served as the Vice-President of the Japan Football Association from July 1998 to July 2008. In 2005, he was inducted in the Japan Football Hall of Fame.

He also served as a member of the House of Councillors between 1995 and 2001.

== Early life ==
Kamamoto was born in Kyoto on 15 April 1944. He grew up in Kyoto and attended Yamashiro High School. Then, he joined the Waseda University School of Commerce. For four years in a row, he was the top scorer in the Kanto university league. He won the 1963 and the 1966 Emperor's Cup while he was at Waseda University. This was the last time a university team won the Emperor's Cup. He earned a bachelor of arts degree in Commerce from Waseda University in 1966.

== Club career ==
After graduating, Kamamoto joined the Japan Soccer League club Yanmar Diesel in 1967 (currently known as Cerezo Osaka). He played all league games from his first season on. In 1968, he became the top scorer in the Japan Soccer League. Yanmar Diesel won their 1st title, the 1968 Emperor's Cup, with Kamamoto's winning goal in the final. The club also won the 1970 Emperor's Cup. In 1971, for the first time, the club became league champions and Kamamoto became the top scorer for a second time. Between 1974 and 1975, Yanmar Diesel won the league for two years in a row and also won the 1974 Emperor's Cup. In 1978, Kamamoto became a player manager. The club was league champions in 1980. In 1982, Kamamoto ruptured his Achilles tendon twice and, in 1984, when he was 40 years old, he retired. All in all, Kamamoto was top scorer seven times and was selected in the best eleven fourteen times. He was also selected as Japanese Footballer of the Year seven times.

== International career ==
On 3 March 1964, when Kamamoto was a Waseda University student, he debuted and scored a goal for the Japan national team against the Singapore national football team. In October, he was selected by Japan for the 1964 Summer Olympics in Tokyo. He played in all matches and scored one goal.

In 1968, Kamamoto was also selected by Japan for the 1968 Summer Olympics in Mexico City, where Japan won the Bronze Medal and Kamamoto was the top scorer. He played in all matches for his country and scored seven goals. In 2018, this team was inducted to the Japan Football Hall of Fame.

Kamamoto played football at the 1966 Asian Games. In the 1970s, after many Olympic players left the national team, he continued being selected. He played at the 1970 and 1974 Asian Games, and took part in the qualifying campaigns for the 1974 and 1978 FIFA World Cups, scoring two goals in the former. He retired from the national team in 1977, having played in 76 matches while scoring 75 goals, a tally that has yet to be beaten in the Japanese team even as its overall quality improved and international matches became more frequent. Kamamoto, however, has been recognized with 80 goals in 84 appearances from the Japan Football Association, and previously as well by FIFA, but he isn't mentioned with this tally in their latest publications.

== Coaching career ==
In 1978, Kamamoto was a player manager for Yanmar Diesel. He led the club to its first league championship in 1980. The club also won the 1983 and 1984 JSL Cup. In 1984, he retired from football and resigned as the manager of Yanmar Diesel. In 1991, he signed as manager with rivals Matsushita Electric (to be later known as Gamba Osaka). He resigned from that position in 1994.

== Political career ==
Kamamoto was selected as a member of the House of Councillors in July 1995 and served until July 2001.

== Death ==
Kamamoto died in a hospital in Osaka from pneumonia on 10 August 2025, at the age of 81.

== Career statistics ==
=== Club ===
Appearances and goals by club, season and competition
Club	Season	League			Emperor's Cup		JSL Cup		Total	
Club	Season	Division	Apps	Goals	Apps	Goals	Apps	Goals	Apps	Goals
Yanmar Diesel	1967	JSL Division 1	14	14	3	7	—		17	21
Yanmar Diesel	1968	JSL Division 1	14	14	3	5	—		17	19
Yanmar Diesel	1969	JSL Division 1	12	10	3	7	—		15	17
Yanmar Diesel	1970	JSL Division 1	14	16	3	5	—		17	21
Yanmar Diesel	1971	JSL Division 1	14	11	3	5	—		17	16
Yanmar Diesel	1972	JSL Division 1	14	11	4	5	—		18	16
Yanmar Diesel	1973	JSL Division 1	16	17	2	0	—		18	17
Yanmar Diesel	1974	JSL Division 1	18	21	4	3	—		22	24
Yanmar Diesel	1975	JSL Division 1	17	9	3	2	—		20	11
Yanmar Diesel	1976	JSL Division 1	18	15	3	2	1	0	22	17
Yanmar Diesel	1977	JSL Division 1	18	20	4	4	3	2	25	26
Yanmar Diesel	1978	JSL Division 1	18	15	3	4	3	4	24	23
Yanmar Diesel	1979	JSL Division 1	18	7	3	2	2	1	22	11
Yanmar Diesel	1980	JSL Division 1	18	10	2	0	3	2	23	12
Yanmar Diesel	1981	JSL Division 1	18	11	2	0	0	0	20	11
Yanmar Diesel	1982	JSL Division 1	8	1	0	0	0	0	8	1
Yanmar Diesel	1983	JSL Division 1	2	0	0	0	0	0	2	0
Yanmar Diesel	1984	JSL Division 1	0	0	3	0	0	0	3	0
Total			251	202	48	51	12	9	311	262

=== International ===
Appearances and goals by national team and year
National team	Year	Apps	Goals
Japan	1964	2	1
Japan	1965	3	3
Japan	1966	7	6
Japan	1967	5	11
Japan	1968	4	7
Japan	1969	0	0
Japan	1970	6	3
Japan	1971	6	8
Japan	1972	8	15
Japan	1973	3	2
Japan	1974	5	5
Japan	1975	7	5
Japan	1976	16	9
Japan	1977	4	0
Total		76	75

== Managerial statistics ==
Team	From	To	Record				
Team	From	To	G	W	D	L	Win %
Gamba Osaka	1993	1994	80	31	0	49	38.75
Fujieda MYFC	2009	2010	—	−	0	−	—
Total			80	31	0	49	38.75

== Honours ==
Yanmar Diesel

- Emperor's Cup: 1968, 1970, 1974
- Japan Soccer League: 1971, 1974, 1975, 1980
- JSL Cup: 1973, 1983, 1984
- All Japan Senior Football Championship: 1976
- Queen's Cup: 1976
- Japanese Super Cup: 1981

Japan

- Summer Olympic Games Bronze Medal: 1968
- Asian Games Bronze Medal: 1966

Individual

- Summer Olympics football top scorer: 1968
- Japanese Footballer of the Year: 1966, 1968, 1971, 1974, 1975, 1980, 1981
- Japan Soccer League Top Scorer: 1968, 1970, 1971, 1974, 1975, 1976 (on his own), 1978 (shared with Carvalho).
- Japan Soccer League Best Eleven: 1967, 1968, 1969, 1970, 1971, 1972, 1974, 1975, 1976, 1977, 1978, 1979, 1980, 1981.
- Japan Soccer League Assists leader: 1973, 1975
- Japan Soccer League Star Ball Award: 1967, 1968, 1970, 1971, 1972
- Japan Soccer League Fighting Spirit Award: 1968
- Japan Soccer League 100 goals Award: 1974
- Japan Soccer League 200 goals Award: 1981
- Asian All Stars: 1967, 1968
- MasterCard Asian/Oceanian Team of the 20th Century: 1998
- Japan Football Hall of Fame: Inducted in 2005

== See also ==
- List of men's footballers with 50 or more international goals
