= Seishiro Shimatani =

Japanese footballer and manager

Seishiro Shimatani 嶋谷 征四郎
Personal information
- Full name: Seishiro Shimatani
- Date of birth: November 6, 1938
- Place of birth: Kyoto, Kyoto, Empire of Japan
- Date of death: October 24, 2001 (aged 62)
- Place of death: Kyoto, Kyoto, Japan
- Position: Midfielder

Youth career
- 1954–1956: Yamashiro High School
- 1957–1960: Kansai University

Senior career*
| Years | Team | Apps | (Gls) |
| 1961–1965 | Furukawa Electric | 8 | (2) |
- Kyoto Shiko
| Total | | 8 | (2) |

International career
| 1959 | Japan | 1 | (0) |

Managerial career
- 1972–1974: Kyoto Shiko
- 1977–1979: Kyoto Shiko
- 1994: Kyoto Purple Sanga
Medal record
Furukawa Electric
| Winner | Emperor's Cup | 1961 |
| Winner | Emperor's Cup | 1964 |
| Runner-up | Emperor's Cup | 1962 |
- * Club domestic league appearances and goals

Seishiro Shimatani (嶋谷 征四郎, Shimatani Seishiro; November 6, 1938 – October 24, 2001) was a Japanese football player and manager. He played for Japan national team.

== Club career ==
Shimatani was born in Kyoto on November 6, 1938. After graduating from Kansai University, he joined Furukawa Electric in 1961. In 1965, Furukawa Electric joined new league Japan Soccer League and he played in 1 season in the league. After he left the club, he played for his local club Kyoto Shiko.

== National team career ==
On January 11, 1959, when Shimatani was a Kansai University student, he debuted for Japan national team against Singapore.

== Coaching career ==
Shimatani managed his local club Kyoto Shiko (later Kyoto Purple Sanga) in 1972. 1972 season is first season Kyoto Shiko was promoted to new division, Japan Soccer League Division 2 from Japanese Regional Leagues. He managed until 1974. In 1977, he managed for Kyoto Shiko again. However, in 1978 season, the club was relegated to Regional Leagues. He resigned in 1978. In 1994, he signed with Kyoto Purple Sanga. He resigned in September.

On October 24, 2001, Shimatani died of cirrhosis in Kyoto at the age of 62.

== Club statistics ==
| Club performance | | | League | |
| Season | Club | League | Apps | Goals |
| Japan | | | League | |
|---|---|---|---|---|
| 1965 | Furukawa Electric | JSL Division 1 | 8 | 2 |
| Total | | | 8 | 2 |

== National team statistics ==
Japan national team
| Year | Apps | Goals |
|---|---|---|
| 1959 | 1 | 0 |
| Total | 1 | 0 |
