= Cha Kyung-bok =

South Korean football manager (1937–2006)

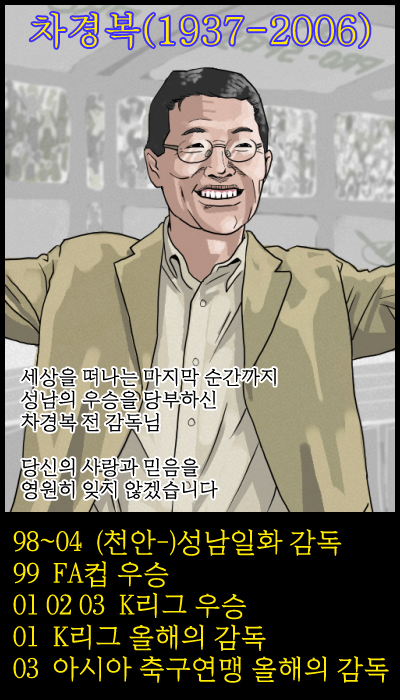
- Caricature of Cha by webtoon creator Shadarapa

Personal information
- Date of birth: 10 January 1937
- Place of birth: Jeongeup, Jeonbuk, South Korea
- Date of death: 31 October 2006 (aged 69)
- Place of death: Seoul, South Korea
- Position: Forward

Youth career
- 1956–1958: Joongdong High School

College career
Years	Team	Apps	(Gls)
1959–1961	Kyung Hee University		
1965–1967	Kyung Hee University		

Senior career*
Years	Team	Apps	(Gls)
1962–1964	ROK Army OPMG (draft)		
1965	Seoul Police Department		
1968–1969	Cheil Industries		
1970–1972	Industrial Bank of Korea		

International career
1959–1960	South Korea U20		
1964–1966	South Korea	3	(0)

Managerial career
- 1983–1985: Incheon National University
- 1986–1990: Kyung Hee University
- 1995–1996: Jeonbuk Dinos
- 1998–2004: Seongnam Ilhwa Chunma
Medal record
Men's football
Representing South Korea
AFC Youth Championship
Winner	1959 Malaya
Winner	1960 Malaya
- * Club domestic league appearances and goals

- Cha Kyung-bok
- Hangul: 차경복
- Hanja: 車敬福
- RR: Cha Gyeongbok
- MR: Ch'a Kyŏngbok

Cha Kyung-bok (10 January 1937 – 31 October 2006) was a South Korean football manager.

== Playing career ==
A native of Jeongeup, Jeonbuk, Cha graduated from Joongdong High School in 1959 and received a bachelor's degree from Kyung Hee University in 1968. He played as a national player during his student days and won two AFC Youth Championships. He also played a group match against United Arab Republic in the 1964 Summer Olympics, but lost the match 10–0. He played for Cheil Industries and Industrial Bank of Korea during his semi-professional career after graduating from university.

== Coaching career ==
On 27 December 1972, Cha got a five-month suspension due to having a fight with an opponent in the middle of a match. Around the same time, he retired as a player and became a coach of Industrial Bank. On 23 September 1975, he played a match as a substitute player due to lack of players in the club.

Cha was appointed as a manager of Jeju provincial team in July 1980, but was sacked for hitting a referee after just three months.

== Refereeing career ==
Cha qualified as a referee in 1982, and umpired two matches in the 1984 Summer Olympics. He also performed the role of assistant referee in the final match.

== Managerial career ==
Cha managed Incheon National University from 1983 to 1985 while he spending his refereeing career. He also managed Kyung Hee University, for which he played in the past, until he became a director of Korea Football Association (KFA) in 1991.

Cha became the head of KFA's technical committee on 30 January 1993. However, he resigned from the association on 8 November due to internal fights of the national team and a defeat to Japan, although the national team succeeded in qualifying for the 1994 FIFA World Cup. On 12 December 1994, he joined K League club Jeonbuk Dinos as their first manager.

Cha had returned to KFA as the head of referees' committee in 1997 after two years with Jeonbuk Dinos, but contracted with Cheonan Ilhwa Chunma (renamed Seongnam Ilhwa Chunma in 2000) after one and a half years. He left his best result at Seongnam alongside his assistant coach Kim Hak-bum. He dominated players with his great leadership, and endowed Kim with authority of the team's tactics. He achieved three consecutive K League titles from 2001 to 2003, and was named the Asian Coach of the Year by Asian Football Confederation in 2003. His team advanced to the AFC Champions League final in 2004, and made a good opportunity to win the Asian title by having a 3–1 away win over Al-Ittihad in the first leg. However, he suffered a shocking 5–0 home defeat in the second leg, and resigned from his post after the match.

Cha died on 31 October 2006 after suffering from Lou Gehrig's disease (ALS) for five months.

== Honours ==
=== Player ===
Kyung Hee University

- Korean National Championship: 1960

Cheil Industries

- Korean National Semipro League (Autumn): 1968
- Korean President's Cup runner-up: 1968

South Korea U20

- AFC Youth Championship: 1959, 1960

=== Manager ===
Seongnam Ilhwa Chunma

- K League 1: 2001, 2002, 2003
- Korean FA Cup: 1999
- Korean League Cup: 2002, 2004
- Korean Super Cup: 2002
- A3 Champions Cup: 2004
- AFC Champions League runner-up: 2004

Individual

- K League 1 Manager of the Year: 2001, 2002, 2003
- K League All-Star: 2002, 2003
- AFC Coach of the Year: 2003
