= Yasuo Takamori =

Japanese footballer and manager

Yasuo Takamori 高森 泰男
Personal information
- Full name: Yasuo Takamori
- Date of birth: March 3, 1934
- Place of birth: Okayama, Empire of Japan
- Height: 1.68 m (5 ft 6 in)
- Position: Defender

Youth career
- 1949–1951: Kanzei High School
- 1952–1955: Rikkyo University

Senior career*
| Years | Team | Apps | (Gls) |
| 1956–1968 | Nippon Kokan | 28 | (0) |
| Total | | 28 | (0) |

International career
| 1955–1963 | Japan | 30 | (0) |

Managerial career
- 1962–1966: Nippon Kokan
- * Club domestic league appearances and goals

Yasuo Takamori (高森 泰男, Takamori Yasuo; March 3, 1934 – 2016) (former name; Yasuo Kageyama, 景山 泰男) was a Japanese football player and manager. He played for Japan national team.

== Club career ==
Takamori was born in Okayama Prefecture on March 3, 1934. After graduating from Rikkyo University, he joined Nippon Kokan in 1956. In 1967, Nippon Kokan was promoted Japan Soccer League. He played 28 games in the league. He retired in 1968.

== National team career ==
On January 2, 1955, when Takamori was a Rikkyo University student, he debuted for Japan national team against Burma. In 1956, he was selected Japan for 1956 Summer Olympics in Melbourne. He also played at 1958 Asian Games and 1962 Asian Games. He played 30 games for Japan until 1963.

== Coaching career ==
In 1962, when Takamori played for Nippon Kokan, he became a playing manager. In 1966 season, he promoted the club to Japan Soccer League. However, he did not managed in the league, because he resigned as manager end of 1966 season.

== National team statistics ==
Japan national team
| Year | Apps | Goals |
|---|---|---|
| 1955 | 5 | 0 |
| 1956 | 3 | 0 |
| 1957 | 0 | 0 |
| 1958 | 4 | 0 |
| 1959 | 10 | 0 |
| 1960 | 1 | 0 |
| 1961 | 2 | 0 |
| 1962 | 3 | 0 |
| 1963 | 2 | 0 |
| Total | 30 | 0 |
