= Nimura =

Nimura (written: 二村 lit. "two villages" or 仁村) is a Japanese surname. Notable people with the surname include:

- Eijin Nimura (二村 英仁, born 1970), Japanese violinist
- Teruo Nimura (二村 昭雄, born 1943), Japanese footballer
- Tōru Nimura (仁村 徹, born 1961), Japanese baseball player
- Janice P. Nimura (active 2022), American author
