= 1960 AFC Youth Championship =

Tournament details
- Host country: Malaya
- Dates: 30 March – 7 April
- Teams: 8

Final positions
- Champions: South Korea (2nd title)
- Runners-up: Malaya
- Third place: Japan
- Fourth place: Indonesia

Tournament statistics
- Matches played: 14
- Goals scored: 81 (5.79 per match)

The 1960 AFC Youth Championship was held in Malaya.

== Teams ==
The following teams entered the tournament:

- Burma
- Indonesia
- Japan
- Malaya (host)
- Philippines
- Singapore
- South Korea
- Thailand

== Group stage ==
=== Group A ===
Team	Pld	W	D	L	GF	GA	GD	Pts
Malaya	3	3	0	0	16	2	+14	6
Japan	3	1	1	1	7	9	−2	3
Burma	3	1	0	2	10	7	+3	2
Philippines	3	0	1	2	3	18	−15	1

Source: AFC
30 March 1960

Malaya	9 – 0	Philippines
Ahmad Dollah 10'; H. Ghani 14', 24', 46', 60'; Robert Choe 23', 47'; Ahmad Taufik 31'; Radzi Sheikh Ahmad 79'	Report

Merdeka Stadium, Kuala Lumpur

31 March 1960

Japan	4 – 2	Burma
T. Kawase 15'; Ikuo Matsumoto 30', 48'; Ryuichi Sugiyama 58'	Report	Tin Win 17'; Toe Aung 23'

Merdeka Stadium, Kuala Lumpur

3 April 1960

Malaya	2 – 1	Burma
Robert Choe 2', 33'	Report	Hla Tay 36'

Merdeka Stadium, Kuala Lumpur

4 April 1960

Philippines	2 – 2	Japan
Romeo Jaranilla 27'; Benjamin Chen 40'	Report	Ryuichi Sugiyama 21'; Takayuki Kuwata 33'

Merdeka Stadium, Kuala Lumpur

5 April 1960

Malaya	5 – 1	Japan
Ahmad Taufik 7', 52'; Hamid Ghani 21'; Robert Choe 63', 68'	Report	Ryuichi Sugiyama 26' (pen.)

Merdeka Stadium, Kuala Lumpur

6 April 1960

Burma	7 – 1	Philippines
Hla Tay 2'; Tin Aung Tua 17', 21', 37', 50', 60'; Hla Kyi 46'	Report	Romeo Jaranilla 48'

Merdeka Stadium, Kuala Lumpur

=== Group B ===
Team	Pld	W	D	L	GF	GA	GD	Pts
South Korea	3	3	0	0	12	4	+8	6
Indonesia	3	2	0	1	14	7	+7	4
Thailand	3	1	0	2	4	9	−5	2
Singapore	3	0	0	3	6	16	−10	0

Source: AFC

30 March 1960

Indonesia	9 – 3	Singapore
Soetjipto Soentoro 1', 78'; Dirhamsjah 9', 28', 49', 80'; Manan 30'; Zulkifli 47', 60'	Report	Chew Seng Thum 34'; Lee Teng Yee 55' (pen.); Quah Kim Siak 74'

Merdeka Stadium, Kuala Lumpur

31 March 1960

South Korea	4 – 1	Thailand
Chung Soon-Chun 6', 14'; Cho Yoon-Ok 8', 34'	Report	Anurat Nanakorn 63'

Merdeka Stadium, Kuala Lumpur

3 April 1960

Thailand	3 – 2	Singapore
Anurat Nanakorn 15', 69'; N.K Chalor 53'	Report	Chew Seng Thum 64'; Quah Kim Siak 75'

Merdeka Stadium, Kuala Lumpur

4 April 1960

South Korea	4 – 2	Indonesia
Cho Yoon-Ok 17'; Chung Soon-Chung 25'; Cha Kyung-Bok 34'; Kim Duk-Joong 74'	Report	Soetjipto Soentoro 47', 80'

Merdeka Stadium, Kuala Lumpur

5 April 1960

Indonesia	3 – 0	Thailand
Soetjipto Soentoro 9'; Sobari 43'; Dzulkifli 65'	Report

Merdeka Stadium, Kuala Lumpur

6 April 1960

South Korea	4 – 1	Singapore
Cho Yoon-Ok 20', 43'; Cha Kyung-Bok 29'; Chung Soon-Chung 53'	Report	Chew Seng Thum 31'

Merdeka Stadium, Kuala Lumpur

== Third place match ==
7 April 1960

Japan	3 – 2	Indonesia
Takayuki Kuwata 10', 33'; T. Kawase 73'	Report	Manan 7'; Dzulkifli 38'

Merdeka Stadium, Kuala Lumpur
Referee: Oei Poh Hwa (Malaya)

JAPAN:
GK	Watanabe
CB	Shibata
CB	Tadao Onishi
RH	Suzuki
CH	Mukoyama
LH	Shimizu
OR	T. Kawase
IR	Takayuki Kuwata
CF	Ikuo Matsumoto
IL	Ryuichi Sugiyama
OL	Moriya

INDONESIA:
GK	Hardi Purnomo
CB	Nani Djaelani
CB	Hantoro
RH	Rasjid Dahlan
CH	Ishak Udin
LH	Idris Mapakajja
OR	Dzulkifli
IR	Manan
CF	Soetjipto Soentoro
IL	Parhim
OL	Sobari

== Final ==
7 April 1960

Malaya	0 – 4	South Korea
	Report	Chung Soon-Chung 1'; Cho Yoon-Ok 7', 10'; Cha Kyung-Bok 30' (pen.)

Merdeka Stadium, Kuala Lumpur
Attendance: 22.000
Referee: Koentadi (Indonesia)

MALAYA:
GK	Teh Cheng Lee
CB	Yee Seng Choy
CB	Abdullah Noordin
RH	Radzi Sheikh Ahmad
CH	Roslan Buang
LH	Namasivayam
OR	Abdullah Dollah
IR	Ong Huck Siang
CF	Robert Choe
IL	Hamid Ghani
OL	Ahmad Taufik

SOUTH KOREA:
GK	Lim Chang-Soo
CB	Park Tong-Kwan
CB	Kim Young-Bai
RH	Lee Rak-Won
CH	Kim Seon-Hwi
LH	Choi Young-Too
OR	Chung Soon-Chung
IR	Lee Young-Kun
CF	Cha Kyung-Bok
IL	Cho Yoon-Ok
OL	Kim Duk-Joong

1960 AFC Youth Championship

South Korea
Second title

== Goalscorers ==
7 goals

- (South Korea) Cho Yoon-Ok

6 goals

- (Federation of Malaya) Robert Choe

5 goals

- (Myanmar) Tin Aung Tua
- (Indonesia) Soetjipto Soentoro
- (South Korea) Chung Soon-Chung
- (Federation of Malaya) Hamid Ghani

4 goals

- (Indonesia) Dirhamsjah

3 goals

- (Japan) Ryuichi Sugiyama
- (Japan) Takayuki Kuwata
- (South Korea) Cha Kyung-Bok
- (Federation of Malaya) Ahmad Taufik
- (Singapore) Chew Seng Thum
- (Thailand) Anurat Nanakorn

2 goals

- (Myanmar) Hla Tay
- (Indonesia) Dzulkifli
- (Indonesia) Manan
- (Indonesia) Zulkifli
- (Japan) Ikuo Matsumoto
- (Japan) T. Kawase
- (Philippines) Romeo Jaranilla
- (Singapore) Quah Kim Siak

1 goal

- (Myanmar) Hla Kyi
- (Myanmar) Tin Win
- (Myanmar) Toe Aung
- (Indonesia) Sobari
- (South Korea) Kim Duk-Joong
- (Federation of Malaya) Ahmad Dollah
- (Federation of Malaya) Radzi Sheikh Ahmad
- (Philippines) Benjamin Chen
- (Singapore) Lee Teng Yee
- (Thailand) N.K Chalor
