= Roslan Buang =

Malaysian footballer

Personal information
- Full name: Mohd Roslan bin Buang
- Date of birth: 1939
- Place of birth: Selangor, British Malaya
- Date of death: 3 October 2020 (aged 81)
- Position: Left-back

Youth career
- 1959: Selangor FA

Senior career*
Years	Team	Apps	(Gls)
1960–1965	Selangor FA		

International career
1959	Malaya U19		
1960–1963	Malaya		
- * Club domestic league appearances and goals

Roslan Buang (born 1939 in Selangor) is a former Selangor FA and Malaya player. He was often called the "Trojan" by fans because of his hard playing style to make quick runs from the side and make cross passes.

== Career overview ==
A left-back, Roslan was a squad player for Selangor FA that captured the 1959, 1961, 1962 and 1963 Malaysia Cup editions. He also won 1960, 1961 and 1962 Malaysia FAM Cup.

In 1959, he was selected for the inaugural Asian Youth Championship.

He also a part of the Malaya player that winning 1960 Merdeka Cup and bronze medals in the 1962 Asian Games.

== Honours ==
Selangor

- Malaysia Cup: 1959, 1961, 1962, 1963
- Malaysia FAM Cup: 1960, 1961, 1962

Malaya U19

- AFC Youth Championship: runner-up 1959, 1960

Malaya

- Asian Games: Bronze Medal 1962
- Merdeka Cup: 1960
