= 1960 Emperor's Cup =

Tournament details
- Country: Japan
- Teams: 16

Final positions
- Champions: Furukawa Electric
- Runners-up: Keio BRB
- Semifinalists: Hitachi; Meiji University

Tournament statistics
- Matches played: 15
- Goals scored: 68 (4.53 per match)

Statistics of Emperor's Cup in the 1960 season.

== Overview ==
It was contested by 16 teams, and Furukawa Electric won the cup.

== Results ==
=== 1st Round ===
- Hitachi 3–0 Kyoto Shiko
- Nagoya Club 3–2 Dot Well
- Toyo Industries 2–1 Kwangaku Club
- Motomo Club 0–8 Keio BRB
- Meiji University 5–0 Nambu Shukyu-dan
- Kwangaku Club 7–0 Toyama Soccer
- Yawata Steel 1–0 Osaka Club
- Teijin Matsuyama 0–6 Furukawa Electric

=== Quarterfinals ===
- Hitachi 7–0 Nagoya Club
- Toyo Industries 1–2 Keio BRB
- Meiji University 1–0 Kwangaku Club
- Yawata Steel 0–3 Furukawa Electric

=== Semifinals ===
- Hitachi 2–2 (lottery) Keio BRB
- Meiji University 1–6 Furukawa Electric

=== Final ===
- Keio BRB 0–4 Furukawa Electric

Furukawa Electric won the cup.
