= 1966 Emperor's Cup =

Japanese football tournament

Tournament details
- Country: Japan
- Teams: 8

Final positions
- Champions: Waseda University
- Runners-up: Toyo Industries
- Semifinalists: Furukawa Electric; Yawata Steel

Tournament statistics
- Matches played: 7
- Goals scored: 21 (3 per match)

Statistics of Emperor's Cup in the 1966 season. The cup was held between January 12 and January 15, 1967.

== Overview ==
It was contested by 8 teams, and Waseda University won the cup.

== Results ==
=== Quarterfinals ===
- Toyo Industries 3–1 Kwansei Gakuin University
- Furukawa Electric 2–0 Chuo University
- Yawata Steel 2–0 Tokyo University of Education
- Mitsubishi Motors 1–3 Waseda University

=== Semifinals ===
- Toyo Industries 1–0 Furukawa Electric
- Yawata Steel 1–2 Waseda University

=== Final ===
- Toyo Industries 2–3 Waseda University

Waseda University won the cup.

1966 Emperor's Cup
(Japan)
Waseda University
4th title
