= 1959 AFC Youth Championship =

Tournament details
- Host country: Malaya
- Dates: 18–26 April
- Teams: 9

Final positions
- Champions: South Korea (1st title)
- Runners-up: Malaya
- Third place: Japan
- Fourth place: Hong Kong

The 1959 AFC Youth Championship was held in Kuala Lumpur, Federation of Malaya. It was the first time the tournament was organised.

== Teams ==
The following teams entered the tournament:

- Burma
- Ceylon
- Hong Kong
- Japan
- Malaya (host)
- Philippines
- Singapore
- South Korea
- Thailand

== Group Allocations ==
Four winners moved to group A and played for the championship. Five other teams moved to consolation group B. Philippines and Thailand had to play in a preliminary round.

Preliminary Match in 18 and 19 April

Team 1	Score	Team 2
Philippines	2–3	Thailand

Main allocation matches

Team 1	Score	Team 2
Malaya	12–0	Ceylon
Hong Kong	2–1	Burma
Japan	4–0	Singapore
South Korea	2–0	Thailand

== Consolation Group B ==
Teams	Pld	W	D	L	GF	GA	GD	Pts
Burma	4	3	1	0	24	11	+13	7
Thailand	4	3	1	0	14	4	+10	7
Singapore	4	1	1	2	15	14	+1	3
Ceylon	4	1	0	3	10	21	–11	2
Philippines	4	0	1	3	4	17	–13	1

20 April	Singapore	2–2	Philippines
	Ceylon	4–6	Burma
21 April	Burma	1–1	Thailand
22 April	Thailand	4–0	Singapore
	Ceylon	2–1	Philippines
23 April	Burma	7–5	Singapore
24 April	Philippines	1–10	Burma
	Ceylon	3–6	Thailand
25 April	Ceylon	1–8	Singapore
	Philippines	0–3	Thailand

== Championship Group A ==
Teams	Pld	W	D	L	GF	GA	GD	Pts
South Korea	3	3	0	0	6	3	+3	6
Malaya	3	2	0	1	14	2	+12	4
Japan	3	1	0	2	8	11	–3	2
Hong Kong	3	0	0	3	2	14	–12	0

20 April	Malaya	7–0	Hong Kong
21 April	South Korea	3–2	Japan
22 April	Malaya	6–0	Japan
23 April	South Korea	1–0	Hong Kong
24 April	Japan	6–2	Hong Kong
25 April	Malaya	1–2	South Korea

A closing match was played on 26 April between South Korea and a team composed of the best players from the other eight teams: South Korea won 3–2.

1959 AFC Youth Championship

South Korea
First title
