= Football at the 1972 Summer Olympics – Men's qualification =

The men's qualification for the 1972 Summer Olympics.

== Qualified teams ==
A total of 16 teams participated in the finals of the Olympic tournament.

- Automatically qualified
  - West Germany (as hosts)
  - Hungary (as holders)
- Europe (UEFA)
  - Denmark
  - East Germany
  - Poland
  - Soviet Union
- Africa (CAF)
  - Ghana
  - Morocco
  - Sudan
- Asia (AFC)
  - Burma
  - Iran
  - Malaysia
- North and Central America (CONCACAF)
  - Mexico
  - United States
- South America (CONMEBOL)
  - Brazil
  - Colombia

== Qualifications ==
=== UEFA (Europe) ===
The European Qualifiers for the 1972 Summer Olympics tournament took place after two rounds between 1 May 1971 and 21 May 1972. Denmark, East Germany, Poland and Soviet Union gained qualification to the Olympic tournament and West Germany as qualified automatically as hosts, Hungary as holders.

=== CONMEBOL (South America) ===
The South American Pre-Olympic tournament was held over a total of two rounds from 26 November to 11 December 1971 in Colombia and saw Brazil and Colombia qualify.

=== CONCACAF (North, Central America and Caribbean) ===
The CONCACAF qualifying rounds and Pre-Olympic tournament was held from 23 May 1971 to 28 May 1972, and saw Mexico and United States qualify.

=== CAF (Africa) ===
The African Qualifiers tournament for the 1972 Summer Olympics took place over a total of two rounds between 7 March 1971 and 28 May 1972. Ghana, Morocco and Sudan gained qualification to the Olympic tournament.

=== AFC (Asia) ===
The Pre-Olympic tournaments of the Asian Qualifiers for the 1972 Summer Olympic were held from 23 September 1971 to 3 May 1972. Burma, Iran and Malaysia qualify.
