= Football at the 1966 Asian Games =

Asian Games

- Date: 9–20 December
- Nations: 11

Medalists
gold medal	Burma
silver medal	Iran
bronze medal	Japan

Football was contested as part of the programme for the 1966 Asian Games which was hosted in Bangkok, Thailand from 9 to 20 December 1966. It was the fifth edition of the men's football tournament at the multi-sport event organised by the Asian Games Federation.

The football tournament began with the first matches of the group stage on 9 December 1966 and ended with the gold medal match on 20 December 1966. Burma and Iran contested the final. Burma defeated Iran 1–0 to win the gold medal. In the bronze medal match, Japan defeated Singapore 2–0.

== Background ==
Football had been part of the Asian Games programme following the debut of the men's competition at the inaugural 1951 Asian Games in India.

India and Taiwan held the record for gold medals having both won the football tournament twice. India were the defending champions after defeating South Korea 2–1 in the gold medal match at the 1962 Asian Games in Indonesia.

== Format ==
In total, 11 teams took part in the competition. They were drawn into three single round robin groups – two of four teams and one of three teams. The group winners and runners-up were then drawn into two single round robin groups of three teams. The winners and runners-up of the second group stage would then contest the semi-finals which would decide the teams contesting the gold and bronze medal matches.

=== Participants ===
- Burma
- India
- Indonesia
- Iran
- Japan
- Malaysia
- Singapore
- South Korea
- Taiwan
- Thailand
- South Vietnam

== First group stage ==
=== Group A ===
Thailand and Burma advanced to the second group stage.

==== Table ====
Pos	Team	Pld	W	D	L	GF	GA	GR	Pts	Qualification
1	Thailand	2	1	1	0	4	1	4.000	3	Qualification for the second group stage
2	Burma	2	1	1	0	2	1	2.000	3	Qualification for the second group stage
3	South Korea	2	0	0	2	0	4	0.000	0	

==== Matches ====
10 December 1966

Thailand	3–0	South Korea

12 December 1966

South Korea	0–1	Burma

14 December 1966

Burma	1–1	Thailand

=== Group B ===
Japan and Iran advanced to the second group stage.

==== Table ====
Pos	Team	Pld	W	D	L	GF	GA	GR	Pts	Qualification
1	Japan	3	3	0	0	6	2	3.000	6	Qualification for the second group stage
2	Iran	3	2	0	1	7	4	1.750	4	Qualification for the second group stage
3	India	3	1	0	2	4	7	0.571	2	
4	Malaysia	3	0	0	3	1	5	0.200	0	

==== Matches ====
10 December 1966

Japan	2–1	India
Teruki Miyamoto 50', 53'		Ashok Chatterjee 48'

Chulalongkorn University Stadium, Bangkok
Attendance: 10,000
10 December 1966

Iran	2–0	Malaysia
Shirzadegan 28'; Behzadi 50'

Attendance: 15,000

11 December 1966

Iran	1–3	Japan
Shirzadegan 37'		Kamamoto 56'; Sugiyama 84'; Ogi 90' (pen.)

Attendance: 10,000
Referee: Rodfetton (Thailand)
12 December 1966

Malaysia	1–2	India
Unknown		Inder Singh; Jarnail Singh (pen.)

13 December 1966

India	1–4	Iran
Jarnail Singh 12' (pen.)		Esmaeili 20', 85'; Talebi 25'; Jabbari 87'

Attendance: 10,000
14 December 1966

Malaysia	0–1	Japan

=== Group C ===
Indonesia and Singapore advanced to the second group stage.

==== Table ====
Pos	Team	Pld	W	D	L	GF	GA	GR	Pts	Qualification
1	Indonesia	3	2	1	0	6	1	6.000	5	Qualification for the second group stage
2	Singapore	3	1	1	1	8	6	1.333	3	Qualification for the second group stage
3	South Vietnam	3	1	1	1	2	6	0.333	3	
4	Taiwan	3	0	1	2	5	8	0.625	1	

==== Matches ====
10 December 1966

Indonesia	3–0	Singapore

11 December 1966

Indonesia	0–0	South Vietnam

12 December 1966

South Vietnam	2–1	Taiwan

13 December 1966

Singapore	3–3	Taiwan

14 December 1966

Taiwan	1–3	Indonesia

14 December 1966

Singapore	5–0	South Vietnam

== Second group stage ==
=== Group A ===
Japan and Singapore advanced to the semi-finals.

==== Table ====
Pos	Team	Pld	W	D	L	GF	GA	GR	Pts	Qualification
1	Japan	2	2	0	0	10	2	5.000	4	Qualification for the semi-finals
2	Singapore	2	1	0	1	3	5	0.600	2	Qualification for the semi-finals
3	Thailand	2	0	0	2	1	7	0.143	0	

==== Matches ====
15 December 1966

Thailand	0–2	Singapore

16 December 1966

Japan	5–1	Singapore

17 December 1966

Thailand	1–5	Japan

=== Group B ===
Burma and Iran advanced to the semi-finals.

==== Table ====
Pos	Team	Pld	W	D	L	GF	GA	GR	Pts	Qualification
1	Burma	2	1	1	0	3	2	1.500	3	Qualification for the semi-finals
2	Iran	2	1	0	1	1	1	1.000	2	Qualification for the semi-finals
3	Indonesia	2	0	1	1	2	3	0.667	1	

==== Matches ====
15 December 1966

Burma	2–2	Indonesia

16 December 1966

Iran	1–0	Indonesia
Behzadi 27'

Attendance: 5,000
Referee: Tom Kay (Singapore)

17 December 1966

Burma	1–0	Iran
Tain Ay 27'

Attendance: 12,000

== Semi-finals ==
Iran defeated Japan and Burma defeated Singapore to advance to the gold medal match.

18 December 1966

Japan	0–1	Iran
		Esmaili 33'

Attendance: 20,000
Referee: N. Chaterjee (India)

18 December 1966

Burma	2–0	Singapore

== Bronze medal match ==
Japan defeated Singapore to win the bronze medal.

19 December 1966

Japan	2–0	Singapore

== Gold medal match ==
Burma defeated Iran to win the gold medal.

20 December 1966

Iran	0–1	Burma
		Aung Khin 67'

Attendance: 35,000
