= 1961 Emperor's Cup =

Tournament details
- Country: Japan
- Teams: 16

Final positions
- Champions: Furukawa Electric
- Runners-up: Chuo University
- Semifinalists: Toyo Industries; Yawata Steel

Tournament statistics
- Matches played: 15
- Goals scored: 59 (3.93 per match)

Statistics of Emperor's Cup in the 1961 season.

== Overview ==
It was contested by 16 teams, and Furukawa Electric won the cup.

== Results ==
=== 1st round ===
- Toyo Industries 3–0 Waseda University WMW
- Hitachi 3–0 Nagoya Bank
- Toyama Soccer 0–2 Chuo University
- Teijin Matsuyama 2–3 Kwangaku Club
- Kwangaku Club 0–3 Shida Soccer
- Furukawa Electric 2–1 Nippon Dunlop
- Sendai Ikuen Gakuen High School 2–4 Rikkyo University
- Hokkai Gakuen University 1–12 Yawata Steel

=== Quarterfinals ===
- Toyo Industries 1–0 Hitachi
- Chuo University 2–1 Kwangaku Club
- Shida Soccer 1–3 Furukawa Electric
- Rikkyo University 1–4 Yawata Steel

=== Semifinals ===
- Toyo Industries 0–0 (lottery) Chuo University
- Furukawa Electric 2–1 Yawata Steel

=== Final ===
- Chuo University 2–3 Furukawa Electric

Furukawa Electric won the cup.
