= 1969 Emperor's Cup =

Japanese football club competition

Tournament details
- Country: Japan
- Teams: 8

Final positions
- Champions: Toyo Industries (3rd title)
- Runners-up: Rikkyo University
- Semifinalists: Furukawa Electric; Mitsubishi Motors

Tournament statistics
- Matches played: 7
- Goals scored: 29 (4.14 per match)

Statistics of Emperor's Cup in the 1969 season.

== Overview ==
It was contested by 8 teams, and Toyo Industries won the championship.

== Results ==
=== Quarterfinals ===
- Keio University 2–4 Furukawa Electric
- Hosei University 1–6 Toyo Industries
- Rikkyo University 3–3 (lottery) Yawata Steel
- Meiji University 0–1 Mitsubishi Motors

=== Semifinals ===
- Furukawa Electric 0–1 Toyo Industries
- Rikkyo University 2–1 Mitsubishi Motors

=== Final ===
- Toyo Industries 4–1 Rikkyo University

Toyo Industries won the championship.

1969 Emperor's Cup
(Japan)
Toyo Industries
3 title
