= 1968 Japan Soccer League =

Japan Soccer League
- Season: 1968
- Champions: Toyo Industries; 4th title
- Asian Club Championship: Toyo Industries
- Matches: 56
- Goals: 185 (3.3 per match)
- Top goalscorer: Kunishige Kamamoto (14 goals)
- Average attendance: 11,653

The 1968 season in Japanese football.

== League tables ==
=== Japan Soccer League ===
| Pos | Team | Pld | W | D | L | GF | GA | GD | Pts | Qualification |
|---|---|---|---|---|---|---|---|---|---|---|
| 1 | Toyo Industries | 14 | 10 | 1 | 3 | 31 | 11 | +20 | 21 | Champions |
| 2 | Yanmar Diesel | 14 | 7 | 5 | 2 | 29 | 18 | +11 | 19 | |
| 3 | Mitsubishi Motors | 14 | 7 | 4 | 3 | 25 | 18 | +7 | 18 | |
| 4 | Yawata Steel | 14 | 7 | 3 | 4 | 32 | 19 | +13 | 17 | |
| 5 | Furukawa Electric | 14 | 7 | 3 | 4 | 24 | 17 | +7 | 17 | |
| 6 | Nagoya Mutual Bank | 14 | 3 | 3 | 8 | 17 | 25 | −8 | 9 | |
| 7 | Hitachi | 14 | 3 | 2 | 9 | 17 | 31 | −14 | 8 | To promotion/relegation Series |
| 8 | Nippon Kokan | 14 | 0 | 3 | 11 | 10 | 46 | −36 | 3 | To promotion/relegation Series |

Source: RSSSF

=== Promotion/relegation Series ===
| JSL | 1st leg | 2nd leg | Senior Cup |
|---|---|---|---|
| Hitachi | 1-0 | 3-2 | Urawa SC (Cup runner-up) |
| Nippon Kokan | 1-0 | 0-1 | Toyota Motors (Cup winner) |

No relegations.

=== Team of the Year ===
| Position | Footballer | Club | Nationality |
|---|---|---|---|
| GK | Kenzo Yokoyama (3) | Mitsubishi Motors | Japan |
| DF | Hiroshi Katayama (3) | Mitsubishi Motors | Japan |
| DF | Masakatsu Miyamoto (3) | Furukawa Electric | Japan |
| DF | Mitsuo Kamata (2) | Furukawa Electric | Japan |
| DF | Yoshitada Yamaguchi (1) | Hitachi | Japan |
| MF | Aritatsu Ogi (3) | Toyo Industries | Japan |
| MF | Ryuichi Sugiyama (3) | Mitsubishi Motors | Japan |
| MF | Teruki Miyamoto (3) | Yawata Steel | Japan |
| FW | Shigeo Yaegashi (3) | Furukawa Electric | Japan |
| FW | Kunishige Kamamoto (1) | Yanmar Diesel | Japan |
| FW | Masashi Watanabe (1) | Yawata Steel | Japan |
