= 1965 Emperor's Cup =

Japanese football tournament

Tournament details
- Country: Japan
- Teams: 8

Final positions
- Champions: Toyo Industries (1st title)
- Runners-up: Yawata Steel
- Semifinalists: Kwansei Gakuin University; Waseda University

Tournament statistics
- Matches played: 7
- Goals scored: 34 (4.86 per match)

Statistics of Emperor's Cup in the 1965 season. The tournament was played between 13 January and 16 January, 1966.

== Overview ==
It was contested by 8 teams, and Toyo Industries won the cup for the first time.

== Results ==
=== Quarterfinals ===
- Kwansei Gakuin University 1–0 Furukawa Electric
- Toyo Industries 5–0 Chuo University
- Yawata Steel 5–1 Meiji University
- Waseda University 3–0 Hitachi

=== Semifinals ===
- Kwansei Gakuin University 0–7 Toyo Industries
- Yawata Steel 4–3 Waseda University

=== Final ===
- Toyo Industries 3–2 Yawata Steel

Toyo Industries won the championship.

1965 Emperor's Cup
(Japan)
Toyo Industries
First title
