= 1966 Japan Soccer League =

Japan Soccer League
- Season: 1966
- Champions: Toyo Industries; 2nd title
- Relegated: Nagoya Mutual Bank
- Matches: 56
- Goals: 183 (3.27 per match)
- Top goalscorer: Aritatsu Ogi (14 goals)
- Average attendance: 5,683

The 1966 season of the Japan Soccer League.

== League tables ==
=== Japan Soccer League ===
Pos	Team	Pld	W	D	L	GF	GA	GD	Pts	Qualification
1	Toyo Industries	14	12	1	1	43	6	+37	25	Champions
2	Yawata Steel	14	10	1	3	33	16	+17	21	
3	Furukawa Electric	14	9	2	3	30	17	+13	20	
4	Mitsubishi Motors	14	8	2	4	24	24	0	18	
5	Hitachi	14	5	3	6	24	28	−4	13	
6	Toyoda Automatic Loom Works	14	2	3	9	10	29	−19	7	
7	Nagoya Mutual Bank	14	2	0	12	12	34	−22	4	To promotion/relegation Series
8	Yanmar Diesel	14	1	2	11	7	29	−22	4	To promotion/relegation Series

Source: RSSSF

=== Promotion/relegation Series ===
Nagoya Mutual Bank became the first original JSL club to be relegated. In its place, Nippon Kokan from Kawasaki, Kanagawa was promoted and began a long career of league success that was only brought to a halt by the professionalization of the league.

JSL	1st leg	2nd leg	Senior Cup
Nagoya Mutual Bank (JSL 7th Place)	2-3	1-2	Nippon Kokan (cup runner-up)
Yanmar Diesel (JSL 8th Place)	1-0	1-1	Urawa SC (cup winner)

Nippon Kokan promoted, Nagoya Mutual Bank relegated.

== Team of the Year ==
Position	Footballer	Club	Nationality
GK	Kenzo Yokoyama (1)	Mitsubishi Motors	Japan
DF	Hiroshi Katayama (1)	Mitsubishi Motors	Japan
DF	Masakatsu Miyamoto (1)	Furukawa Electric	Japan
DF	Kazuo Imanishi (1)	Toyo Industries	Japan
MF	Aritatsu Ogi (1)	Toyo Industries	Japan
MF	Hisao Kami (1)	Yawata Steel	Japan
MF	Ryuichi Sugiyama (1)	Mitsubishi Motors	Japan
MF	Teruki Miyamoto (1)	Yawata Steel	Japan
FW	Shigeo Yaegashi (1)	Furukawa Electric	Japan
FW	Takayuki Kuwata (1)	Toyo Industries	Japan
FW	Ikuo Matsumoto (1)	Toyo Industries	Japan
