= 1967 Japan Soccer League =

Japan Soccer League
- Season: 1967
- Champions: Toyo Industries; 3rd title
- Relegated: Toyota Automated Loom Works
- Matches: 56
- Goals: 225 (4.02 per match)
- Top goalscorer: Takeo Kimura (15 goals)
- Average attendance: 5,759

The 1967 season in Japanese football

== League tables ==
=== Japan Soccer League ===
Pos	Team	Pld	W	D	L	GF	GA	GD	Pts	Qualification
1	Toyo Industries	14	10	2	2	37	16	+21	22	Champions
2	Furukawa Electric	14	8	4	2	39	22	+17	20	
3	Mitsubishi Motors	14	9	1	4	38	19	+19	19	
4	Yawata Steel	14	8	2	4	29	22	+7	18	
5	Yanmar Diesel	14	6	2	6	28	27	+1	14	
6	Hitachi	14	5	2	7	26	27	−1	12	
7	Nippon Kokan	14	2	1	11	16	40	−24	5	To promotion/relegation Series
8	Toyoda Automatic Loom Works	14	0	2	12	12	52	−40	2	To promotion/relegation Series

=== Promotion/relegation Series ===
JSL	1st leg	2nd leg	Senior Cup
Nippon Kokan	2-3	3-2	Toyota Motors (Cup runner-up)
Toyoda Automatic Loom Works	0-3	0-3	Nagoya Mutual Bank (Cup winner)

Nagoya Mutual Bank promoted, Toyoda Automatic Loom Works relegated.

=== Team of The Year ===
Position	Footballer	Club	Nationality
GK	Kenzo Yokoyama (2)	Mitsubishi Motors	Japan
DF	Hiroshi Katayama (2)	Mitsubishi Motors	Japan
DF	Masakatsu Miyamoto (2)	Furukawa Electric	Japan
DF	Mitsuo Kamata (1)	Furukawa Electric	Japan
MF	Aritatsu Ogi (2)	Toyo Industries	Japan
MF	Hisao Kami (2)	Yawata Steel	Japan
MF	Ryuichi Sugiyama (2)	Mitsubishi Motors	Japan
MF	Teruki Miyamoto (2)	Yawata Steel	Japan
FW	Shigeo Yaegashi (2)	Furukawa Electric	Japan
FW	Takayuki Kuwata (2)	Toyo Industries	Japan
FW	Takeo Kimura (1)	Furukawa Electric	Japan

== NHK Cup ==
In between the League and the Emperor's Cup (which was played in January 1968 in order to allow for a change of format for the next season), a special match pitting the JSL champions Toyo Industries against All Japan University Soccer Tournament winners Kansai University was played in New Year, 1968. It was a predecessor to the later Japanese Super Cup, which began to be played in 1977, by which time the university teams had ceased to be viable contenders to the Emperor's Cup.

January 1, 1968

Toyo Industries	1 – 0	Kansai University

National Stadium, Tokyo
