= 1969 Japan Soccer League =

Japan Soccer League
- Season: 1969
- Teams: 8
- Champions: Mitsubishi Motors; 1st title
- Runner up: Toyo Industries
- Matches: 56
- Goals: 176 (3.14 per match)
- Top goalscorer: Hiroshi Ochiai(12 goals)

The 1969 season in Japanese football.

== League tables ==
=== Japan Soccer League ===
| Pos | Team | Pld | W | D | L | GF | GA | GD | Pts | Qualification |
|---|---|---|---|---|---|---|---|---|---|---|
| 1 | Mitsubishi Motors | 14 | 10 | 4 | 0 | 29 | 8 | +21 | 24 | Champions |
| 2 | Toyo Industries | 14 | 10 | 1 | 3 | 31 | 10 | +21 | 21 | |
| 3 | Yawata Steel | 14 | 5 | 5 | 4 | 24 | 23 | +1 | 15 | |
| 4 | Furukawa Electric | 14 | 5 | 4 | 5 | 20 | 20 | 0 | 14 | |
| 5 | Yanmar Diesel | 14 | 6 | 1 | 7 | 25 | 25 | 0 | 13 | |
| 6 | Nippon Kokan | 14 | 4 | 3 | 7 | 18 | 32 | −14 | 11 | |
| 7 | Hitachi | 14 | 3 | 4 | 7 | 17 | 27 | −10 | 10 | To promotion/relegation Series |
| 8 | Nagoya Mutual Bank | 14 | 2 | 0 | 12 | 12 | 31 | −19 | 4 | To promotion/relegation Series |

Source: RSSSF

=== Promotion/relegation Series ===
| JSL | 1st leg | 2nd leg | Senior Cup |
|---|---|---|---|
| Hitachi | 2-0 | 1-0 | Kofu SC (Cup runner-up) |
| Nagoya Mutual Bank | 2-0 | 2-1 | Urawa SC (Cup winner) |

No relegations.

=== Team of the Year ===
| Position | Footballer | Club | Nationality |
|---|---|---|---|
| GK | Kenzo Yokoyama (4) | Mitsubishi Motors | Japan |
| DF | Hiroshi Katayama (4) | Mitsubishi Motors | Japan |
| DF | Yoshio Kikugawa (1) | Mitsubishi Motors | Japan |
| DF | Mitsuo Kamata (4) | Furukawa Electric | Japan |
| DF | Yoshitada Yamaguchi (2) | Hitachi | Japan |
| MF | Aritatsu Ogi (4) | Toyo Industries | Japan |
| MF | Ryuichi Sugiyama (4) | Mitsubishi Motors | Japan |
| MF | Teruki Miyamoto (4) | Yawata Steel | Japan |
| MF | Takaji Mori (1) | Mitsubishi Motors | Japan |
| FW | Kunishige Kamamoto (2) | Yanmar Diesel | Japan |
| FW | Hiroshi Ochiai (1) | Mitsubishi Motors | Japan |
