= 1964 Emperor's Cup =

Japanese football tournament

Tournament details
- Country: Japan
- Teams: 10

Final positions
- Champions: Yawata Steel and Furukawa Electric
- Runners-up: None
- Semifinalists: Waseda University; Toyo Industries

Tournament statistics
- Matches played: 21
- Goals scored: 80 (3.81 per match)

Statistics of Emperor's Cup in the 1964 season. The cup was held from 11 to 17 January 1965.

== Overview ==
It was contested by 10 teams, and Yawata Steel and Furukawa Electric won the championship.

== Results ==
=== Group A ===
Pos	Team	Pld	W	D	L	GF	GA	GD	Pts	Qualification
1	Yawata Steel	4	4	0	0	12	3	+9	8	Final
2	Waseda University	4	3	0	1	14	2	+12	6	
3	Mitsubishi Motors	4	2	0	2	7	7	0	4	
4	Kansai University	4	1	0	3	8	8	0	2	
5	Nihon University	4	0	0	4	2	23	−21	0	

Source: RSSSF

=== Group B ===
Pos	Team	Pld	W	D	L	GF	GA	GD	Pts	Qualification
1	Furukawa Electric	4	3	1	0	8	2	+6	7	Final
2	Toyo Industries	4	2	1	1	8	5	+3	5	
3	Hitachi	4	2	0	2	8	10	−2	4	
4	Kwansei Gakuin University	4	1	0	3	7	10	−3	2	
5	Meiji University	4	1	0	3	6	10	−4	2	

Source: RSSSF

=== Final ===
- Yawata Steel 0–0 Furukawa Electric

Yawata Steel and Furukawa Electric shared the cup.
