= 1967 Emperor's Cup =

Japanese football tournament

Tournament details
- Country: Japan
- Teams: 8

Final positions
- Champions: Toyo Industries (2nd title)
- Runners-up: Mitsubishi Motors
- Semifinalists: Kansai University; Yanmar Diesel

Tournament statistics
- Matches played: 7
- Goals scored: 28 (4 per match)

Statistics of Emperor's Cup in the 1967 season. The cup was held between January 11 and January 14, 1968.

== Overview ==
It was contested by 8 teams, and Toyo Industries won the championship.

== Results ==
=== Quarterfinals ===
- Kansai University 1–0 Nippon Kokan
- Tokyo University of Education 1–3 Mitsubishi Motors
- Chuo University 4–5 Yanmar Diesel
- Kwansei Gakuin University 0–5 Toyo Industries

=== Semifinals ===
- Kansai University 0–5 Mitsubishi Motors
- Yanmar Diesel 1–2 Toyo Industries

=== Final ===
- Mitsubishi Motors 0–1 Toyo Industries

Toyo Industries won the championship.

1967 Emperor's Cup
(Japan)
Toyo Industries
2nd title
