= Nippon Steel Yawata SC =

Nippon Steel Yahata
- Full name: Nippon Steel Yahata Soccer Club
- Nickname: Nippon Yahata
- Short name: Yahata Steel
- Founded: 1950 (as Yahata Steel)
- Dissolved: 1999
- Ground: Sayagatani Stadium; Kitakyushu, Fukuoka, Japan
- League: Kyushu Football League
Home colours	Away colours

Nippon Steel Yahata Soccer Club (新日本製鐵八幡サッカー部 Shin-Nihon Seitetsu Yahata Sakkā-Bu) was a Japanese football club based in Kitakyushu, Fukuoka Prefecture.

== History ==
Yahata Steel S.C. was founded in 1950 as the works team of the Yahata Steel company, which in 1970 merged with Fuji Steel to become Nippon Steel. During the 1960s the club provided the Japan national football team with many quality players, who strengthened the squad for the 1964 and 1968 Olympic tournaments.

Yahata Steel was one of the original eight clubs that founded the Japan Soccer League (JSL) in 1965 ("Original Eight" (Note: The Original Eight of the Japan Soccer League (JSL) in 1965 were Mitsubishi, Furukawa, Hitachi, Yanmar, Toyo Industries, Yahata Steel, Toyota Industries and Nagoya Mutual Bank.)), and building on its Emperor's Cup win in 1964, it was runner-up of the JSL to Toyo Industries (current Sanfrecce Hiroshima) in 1965 and 1966. In 1981, however, after an uneventful decade in which the club did not win any honours nor was in danger of relegation, Nippon Steel was relegated to Division 2 and never played top flight football again. In 1990 they were relegated yet again, this time leaving the JSL for good after 26 seasons. They thus joined the Kyushu Soccer League. The 1999 season was the last with Nippon Steel Yahata in the Kyushu league.

In 2007, New Wave Kitakyushu (current Giravanz Kitakyushu), formerly part of Mitsubishi Chemical, assumed the mantle of representative of Kitakyushu in the national football leagues by earning promotion to the Japan Football League.

- 1950–1970: Yahata Steel SC
- 1970–1991: Nippon Steel SC
- 1991–1999: Nippon Steel Yahata SC

== Honours ==
- Emperor's Cup: 1964 (shared with Furukawa Electric)
- All Japan Works Football Championship: 1963, 1964
- All Japan Inter-City Football Championship: 1957, 1962
- Kyushu Soccer League: 1992

== Affiliated clubs ==
- Nippon Steel Oita S.C.
- Nippon Steel Kamaishi S.C.
- Nippon Steel Muroran S.C.
