= Japan national football team results (1960–1969) =

This article lists the results for the Japan national football team between 1960 and 1969.

== 1960 ==
Date	Opponent	Result	Score	Venue	Competition	Ref
5 August 1960	Malaya	L	0–3^{1}	(Federation of Malaya) Kuala Lumpur, Malaya	Merdeka Tournament	
10 August 1960	Pakistan	L	1–3^{1}	(Federation of Malaya) Kuala Lumpur, Malaya	Merdeka Tournament	
12 August 1960	Thailand	W	3–1^{1}	(Federation of Malaya) Kuala Lumpur, Malaya	Merdeka Tournament	
6 November 1960	South Korea	L	1–2	Hyochang Stadium, Seoul, South Korea	1962 FIFA World Cup qualification	
1:Not recognized by FIFA.

== 1961 ==
Date	Opponent	Result	Score	Venue	Competition	Ref
28 May 1961	Malaya	W	3–2	National Olympic Stadium, Tokyo, Japan	International Friendly	
11 June 1961	South Korea	L	0–2	National Olympic Stadium, Tokyo, Japan	1962 FIFA World Cup qualification	
2 August 1961	Malaya	L	2–3	(Federation of Malaya) Kuala Lumpur, Malaya	Merdeka Tournament	
6 August 1961	India	W	3–1	(Federation of Malaya) Kuala Lumpur, Malaya	Merdeka Tournament	
10 August 1961	South Vietnam	L	2–3	(Federation of Malaya) Kuala Lumpur, Malaya	Merdeka Tournament	
15 August 1961	Indonesia	L	0–2	Singapore	International Friendly	
28 November 1961	Yugoslavia	L	0–1	National Olympic Stadium, Tokyo, Japan	International Friendly	

== 1962 ==
Date	Opponent	Result	Score	Venue	Competition	Ref
25 August 1962	Thailand	W	3–1	Senayan Stadium, Jakarta, Indonesia	1962 Asian Games Football	
29 August 1962	India	L	0–2	Senayan Stadium, Jakarta, Indonesia	1962 Asian Games Football	
30 August 1962	South Korea	L	0–1	Senayan Stadium, Jakarta, Indonesia	1962 Asian Games Football	
8 September 1962	Malaya	D	2–2	(Federation of Malaya) Kuala Lumpur, Malaya	Merdeka Tournament	
12 September 1962	Pakistan	D	1–1	(Federation of Malaya) Kuala Lumpur, Malaya	Merdeka Tournament	
15 September 1962	Burma	L	1–3	(Federation of Malaya) Kuala Lumpur, Malaya	Merdeka Tournament	
21 September 1962	Singapore	L	1–2	Singapore	International Friendly	

== 1963 ==
Date	Opponent	Result	Score	Venue	Competition	Ref
8 August 1963	Malaya	W	4–3	(Federation of Malaya) Kuala Lumpur, Malaya	Merdeka Tournament	
10 August 1963	Thailand	W	4–1	(Federation of Malaya) Kuala Lumpur, Malaya	Merdeka Tournament	
12 August 1963	South Vietnam	W	5–1	(Federation of Malaya) Kuala Lumpur, Malaya	Merdeka Tournament	
13 August 1963	South Korea	D	1–1	(Federation of Malaya) Kuala Lumpur, Malaya	Merdeka Tournament	
15 August 1963	Republic of China	L	0–2	(Federation of Malaya) Kuala Lumpur, Malaya	Merdeka Tournament	

== 1964 ==
Date	Opponent	Result	Score	Venue	Competition	Ref
3 March 1964	Singapore	W	2–1	Singapore	International Friendly	
23 August 1964	South Vietnam	L	0–2	Kuala Lumpur, Malaysia	Merdeka Tournament	
25 August 1964	South Korea	D	2–2	Kuala Lumpur, Malaysia	Merdeka Tournament	
29 August 1964	South Korea	L	0–3	Kuala Lumpur, Malaysia	Merdeka Tournament	
1 September 1964	India	L	2-3	Kuala Lumpur, Malaysia	Merdeka Tournament	
3 September 1964	Cambodia	L	4-0	Kuala Lumpur, Malaysia	Merdeka Tournament	
3 September 1964	Republic of China	D	2-2	Kuala Lumpur, Malaysia	Merdeka Tournament	
14 October 1964	Argentina	W	3–2^{1}	Komazawa Stadium, Tokyo, Japan	1964 Olympic Games Football	
16 October 1964	Ghana	L	2–3^{1}	Komazawa Stadium, Tokyo, Japan	1964 Olympic Games Football	
18 October 1964	Czechoslovakia	L	0–4^{1}	Komazawa Stadium, Tokyo, Japan	1964 Olympic Games Football	
20 October 1964	Yugoslavia	L	1–6^{1}	Nagai Stadium, Osaka, Japan	1964 Olympic Games Football	
1:Not recognized by FIFA.

== 1965 ==
Date	Opponent	Result	Score	Venue	Competition	Ref
14 March 1965	Hong Kong	W	2–1	Hong Kong	International Friendly	
22 March 1965	Burma	D	1–1	(Myanmar) Rangoon, Burma	International Friendly	
25 March 1965	Singapore	W	4–1	Singapore	International Friendly	
27 March 1965	Malaysia	D	1–1	Kuala Lumpur, Malaysia	International Friendly	
14 August 1965	Malaysia	D	2–2^{1}	Kuala Lumpur, Malaysia	Merdeka Tournament	
15 August 1965	India	D	1–1^{1}	Kuala Lumpur, Malaysia	Merdeka Tournament	
19 August 1965	Republic of China	W	0–4^{1}	Kuala Lumpur, Malaysia	Merdeka Tournament	
23 August 1965	Burma	W	3–1^{1}	Kuala Lumpur, Malaysia	Merdeka Tournament	
25 August 1965	Thailand	D	0–0^{1}	Kuala Lumpur, Malaysia	Merdeka Tournament	
28 August 1965	South Vietnam	W	2–1^{1}	Kuala Lumpur, Malaysia	Merdeka Tournament	
1:Not recognized by FIFA.

== 1966 ==
Date	Opponent	Result	Score	Venue	Competition	Ref
21 July 1966	Soviet Union Olympic football team	L	1–3^{1}	Luhansk, Soviet Union	International Friendly	
13 August 1966	South Korea	L	0–2^{2}	Kuala Lumpur, Malaysia	Merdeka Tournament	
17 August 1966	West Germany Olympic football team	L	0–2^{1}	Neu-Isenburg, West Germany	International Friendly	
18 August 1966	South Vietnam	L	0–2^{2}	Kuala Lumpur, Malaysia	Merdeka Tournament	
20 August 1966	India	L	0–3^{2}	Kuala Lumpur, Malaysia	Merdeka Tournament	
22 August 1966	Singapore	W	1–0^{2}	Kuala Lumpur, Malaysia	Merdeka Tournament	
24 August 1966	Republic of China	W	5–2^{2}	Kuala Lumpur, Malaysia	Merdeka Tournament	
10 December 1966	India	W	2–1	Bangkok, Thailand	1966 Asian Games Football	
11 December 1966	Iran	W	3–1	Bangkok, Thailand	1966 Asian Games Football	
14 December 1966	Malaysia	W	1–0	Bangkok, Thailand	1966 Asian Games Football	
16 December 1966	Singapore	W	5–1	Bangkok, Thailand	1966 Asian Games Football	
17 December 1966	Thailand	W	5–1	Bangkok, Thailand	1966 Asian Games Football	
18 December 1966	Iran	L	0–1	Bangkok, Thailand	1966 Asian Games Football	
19 December 1966	Singapore	W	2–0	Bangkok, Thailand	1966 Asian Games Football	
1:Not recognized by FIFA, because those teams from UEFA did not offer professional players. 2.Not recognized by FIFA.

== 1967 ==
Date	Opponent	Result	Score	Venue	Competition	Ref
27 July 1967	Republic of China	D	2–2	(Taiwan) Taipei Municipal Stadium, Taipei, Republic of China	1968 AFC Asian Cup qualification	
1 August 1967	South Korea	W	2–1	(Taiwan) Taipei Municipal Stadium, Taipei, Republic of China	1968 AFC Asian Cup qualification	
3 August 1967	Philippines	W	2–0	(Taiwan) Taipei Municipal Stadium, Taipei, Republic of China	1968 AFC Asian Cup qualification	
5 August 1967	Indonesia	W	2–1	(Taiwan) Taipei Municipal Stadium, Taipei, Republic of China	1968 AFC Asian Cup qualification	
27 September 1967	Philippines	W	15–0^{1}	Tokyo National Stadium, Tokyo, Japan	1968 Olympic Games Qualification	
30 September 1967	Republic of China	W	4–0^{1}	Tokyo National Stadium, Tokyo, Japan	1968 Olympic Games Qualification	
3 October 1967	Lebanon	W	3–1^{1}	Tokyo National Stadium, Tokyo, Japan	1968 Olympic Games Qualification	
7 October 1967	South Korea	D	3–3^{1}	Tokyo National Stadium, Tokyo, Japan	1968 Olympic Games Qualification	
10 October 1967	South Vietnam	W	1–0^{1}	Tokyo National Stadium, Tokyo, Japan	1968 Olympic Games Qualification	
1:Not recognized by FIFA.

== 1968 ==
Date	Opponent	Result	Score	Venue	Competition
17 January 1968	West Germany Olympic football team	L	0–1^{1}	Tokyo National Stadium, Tokyo, Japan	International Friendly
26 March 1968	Mexico Olympic football team	L	0–4^{1}	Mexico City, Mexico	International Friendly
30 March 1968	Australia	D	2–2	Sydney, Australia	International Friendly
31 March 1968	Australia	L	1–3	Melbourne, Australia	International Friendly
4 April 1968	Australia	W	3–1	Adelaide, Australia	International Friendly
1 August 1968	Czechoslovakia Olympic football team	L	1–3^{1}	unknown	International Friendly
14 October 1968	Nigeria	W	3–1^{1}	Estadio Cuauhtémoc, Puebla, Mexico	1968 Olympic Games Football
16 October 1968	Brazil	W	4–0^{1}	Estadio Cuauhtémoc, Puebla, Mexico	1968 Olympic Games Football
18 October 1968	Spain	W	4–0^{1}	Estadio Azteca, Mexico City, Mexico	1968 Olympic Games Football
20 October 1968	France	W	3–1^{1}	Estadio Azteca, Mexico City, Mexico	1968 Olympic Games Football
22 October 1968	Hungary	L	0–5^{1}	Estadio Azteca, Mexico City, Mexico	1968 Olympic Games Football
24 October 1968	Mexico	W	2–0^{1}	Estadio Azteca, Mexico City, Mexico	1968 Olympic Games Football
1:Not recognized by FIFA.

== 1969 ==
Date	Opponent	Result	Score	Venue	Competition
10 October 1969	Australia	L	1–3	Seoul, South Korea	1970 FIFA World Cup qualification
12 October 1969	South Korea	D	2–2	Seoul, South Korea	1970 FIFA World Cup qualification
16 October 1969	Australia	D	1–1	Seoul, South Korea	1970 FIFA World Cup qualification
18 October 1969	South Korea	L	0–2	Seoul, South Korea	1970 FIFA World Cup qualification
