= Sports in Japan =

Sports in Japan are a significant part of Japanese culture. Traditional sports, such as sumo and martial arts, as well as Western imports like baseball, association football, basketball and tennis are popular with both participants and spectators.

Sumo is considered Japan's national sport. Baseball was introduced to the country by visiting Americans in the 19th century. The Nippon Professional Baseball league has been Japan's largest professional sports competition in terms of television ratings and spectators. Martial arts such as judo, karate and modern kendō are also widely practiced and enjoyed by spectators in the country. Association football has gained wide popularity since the founding of the Japan Professional Football League in 1992. Other popular sports include figure skating, rugby union, golf, table tennis and racing, especially auto racing. Some new sports were invented by changing elements of imported sports.

== History ==
=== Pre-Edo period ===
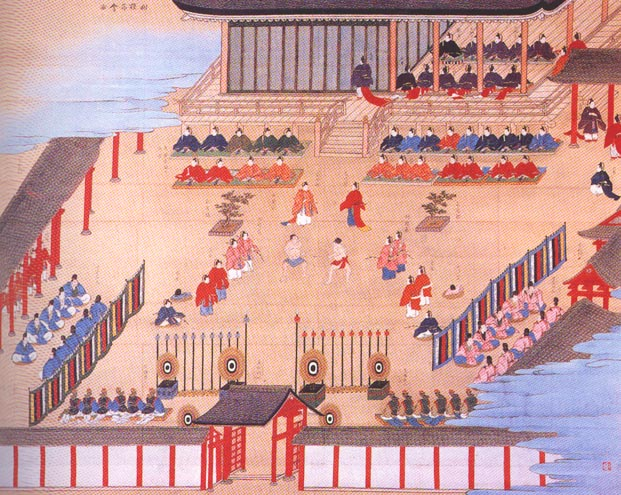
Painting of an ancient Sumo competition, Heian or Kamakura period

Sumo shows an important side of traditional Japanese sport, a religious occasion as well as a sporting event. Many sumo rituals are closely associated with Shinto belief. It is believed that some ancient sumo matches were purely religious events with predetermined outcomes as an offering to kami, with some matches regarded as divination – e.g. if a well-liked fisherman competed and won, a good catch was predicted for the year.

The Kamakura period was a starting point for many martial arts. Kyūdō became popular as kyujutsu, literally bow skill, as a pastime for the samurai class. Yabusame also started as a sport in this period, but is now considered a sacred ceremony.

=== Edo period ===
In the Edo period, sports became a popular way to spend time. The only problem was that they were often accompanied by gambling. A notice to punish playing and betting on sumo without authorization was repeatedly posted to little effect. Kyūdō was encouraged by shōguns and daimyōs as a pastime, and contests as well as record making attempts were held. On April 26, 1686, a samurai named Wasa Daihachiro competing in the Tōshiya made an unsurpassed record of shooting 13,053 arrows and hitting the mark 8,133 times over a 24-hour period. This is even more remarkable when one considers the shooting range for this attempt, a 120-meter-long corridor with a ceiling of only 2.2 meters. In the Olympic Games, archers shoot over a distance of only 70 meters. Martial arts like jujutsu were popular but schools avoided inter-school matches, leaving room only for intramural matches.

=== After Meiji Restoration ===
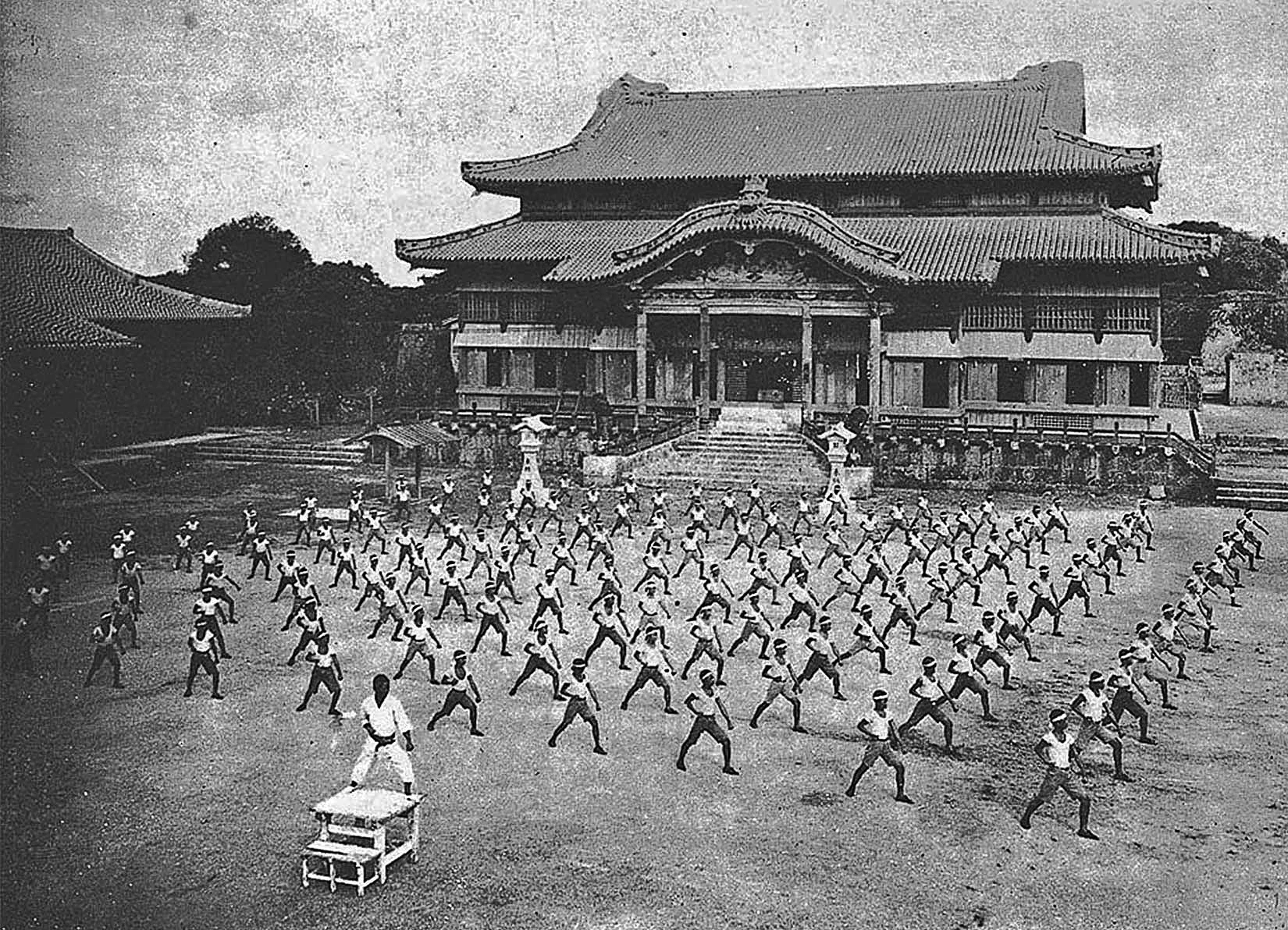
Karate practices at Shuri Castle in 1938

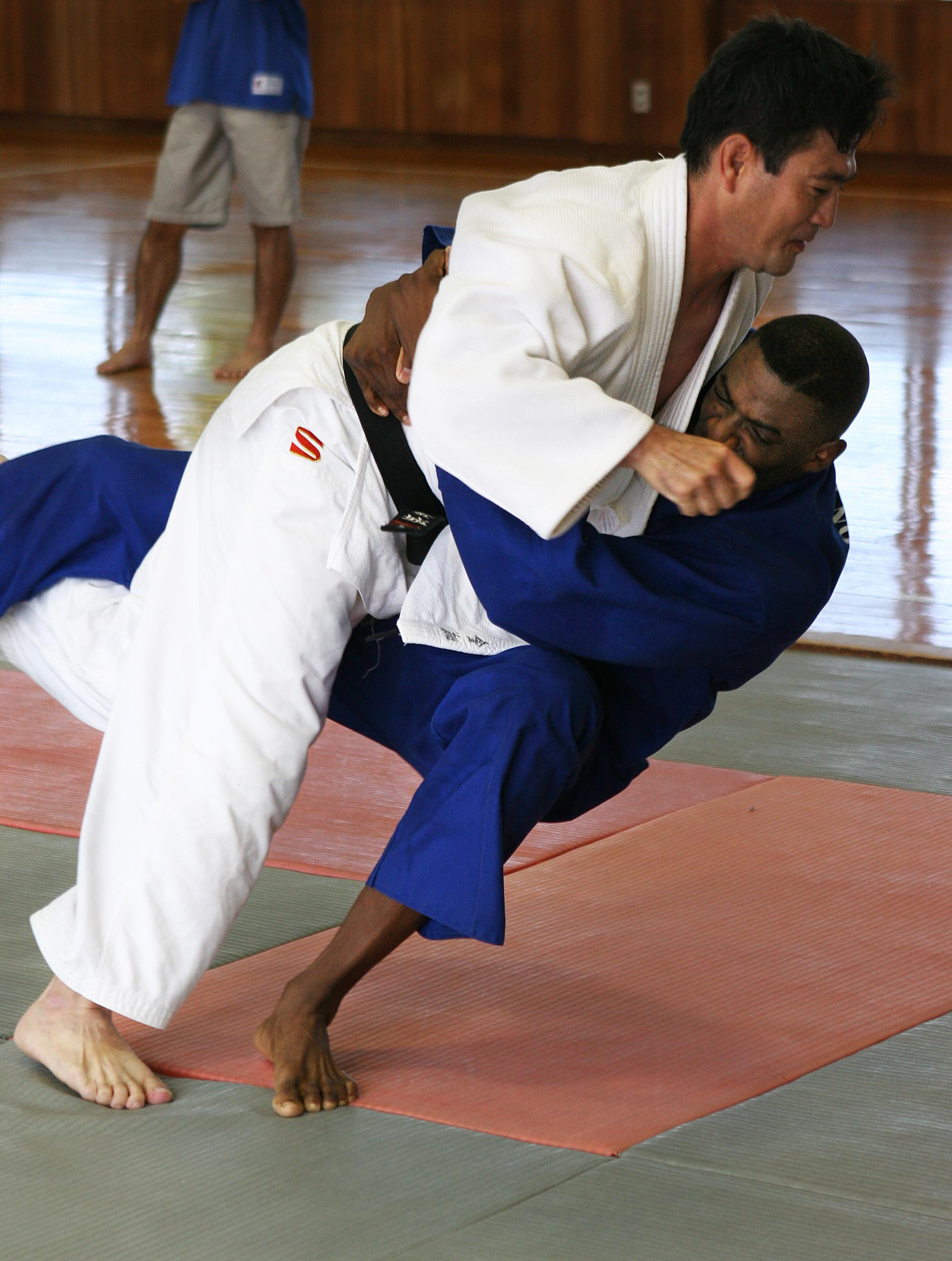
Judoka in Okinawa

After the Meiji Restoration, various kinds of Western sports were introduced into Japan. Playing sports was adopted as a school activity and matches between universities became popular. During the 1870s, track and field events, baseball, football, rugby union, cricket and ice skating were introduced. In 1911, an Austrian gave skiing instruction to the Japanese army. In those days, Western sports were played by a few people, but through the educational system, they spread throughout the country. Western sports were initially stressed as a form of mental discipline, but Japanese have now come to enjoy them as recreational activities. Professional sports, the most famous being baseball which continues even today, started in the late 1920s but persistent rumors of bribes and a general attitude that sports should be for players or as a hobby persisted. Matches between schools attracted large crowd until after World War II when airing sporting events on radio and television became common. Manga with sports-themed stories (colloquially called spokon) have also played a part in attracting readers to slightly less popular sports, such as volleyball, association football, basketball, or American football, although there are also stories focusing on more popular sports like baseball.

Other sports like table tennis and fencing have been popular at different times. Baseball was a staple of early television, and boxing and sumo were aired periodically. Initially, running live sports games was viewed with skepticism as it was believed that fans would rather stay at home if they could watch for free. But, as it actually increased interest and sold more merchandise, airing of sports on television became popular.

Judo has been recognized as an official event in the Olympic Games since the 1964 Summer Olympics in Tokyo. It is also one of the four main forms of amateur competitive wrestling practiced internationally today. Keirin racing has also become an Olympic Games event since the 2000 Summer Olympics in Sydney.

Motorsports have become quite popular in Japan, especially during the latter third of the 20th century. Japanese car manufacturers use a relatively new form of motorsport that is distinctly Japanese and is now being exported abroad.

Japan hosted the Tokyo 2020 Olympics, which were postponed until 2021 due to the COVID-19 pandemic.

== Professional organizations ==
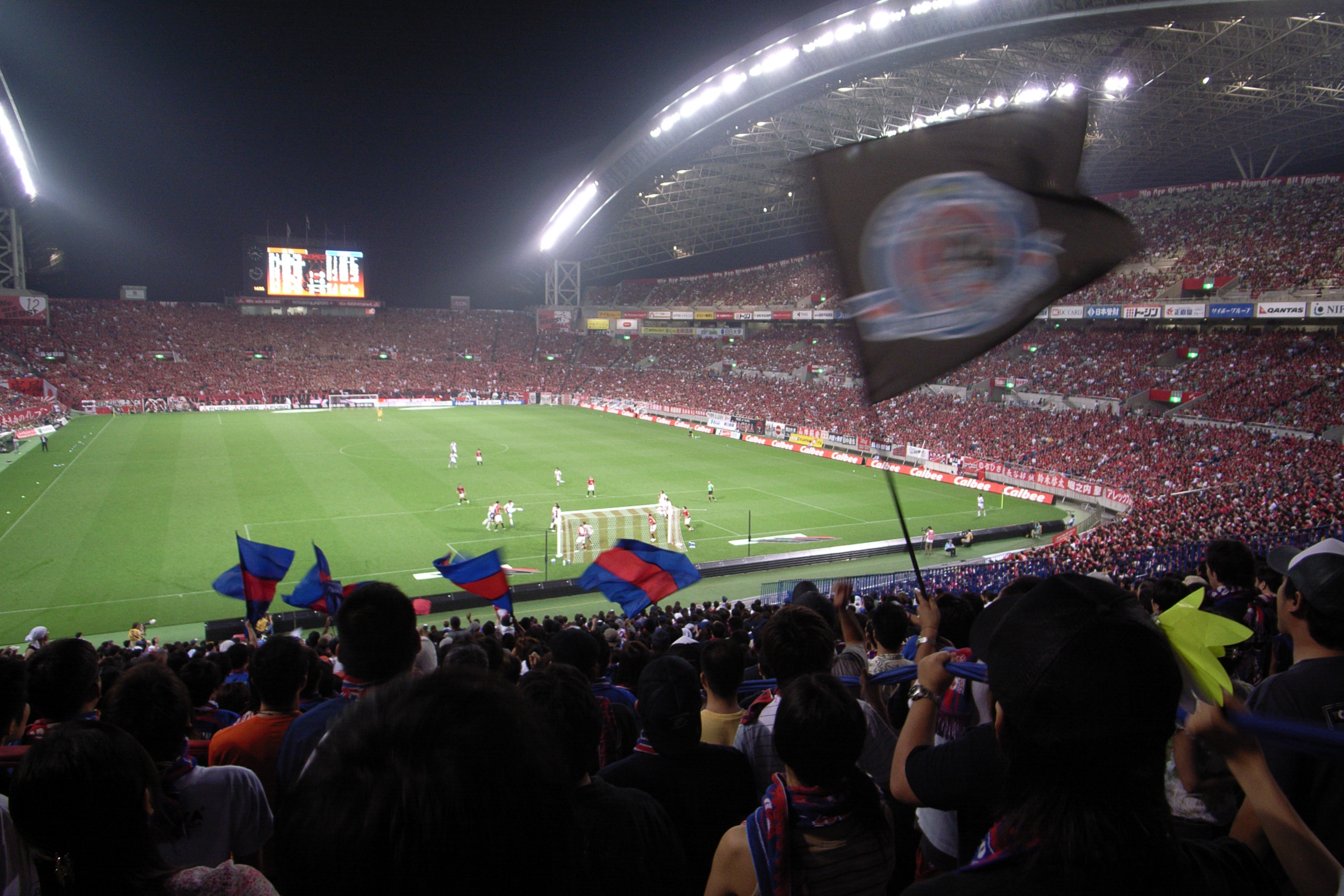
J1 League football game at Saitama Stadium

The most popular professional sports in Japan are baseball, association football (soccer), sumo wrestling, basketball, and golf. Note that most practitioners in the martial arts are not professional, but amateurs.

| Favorite professional sport | 2005 | 2011 | 2013 | 2016 | 2017 | 2018 | 2019 | 2020 | 2021 | 2022 | 2023 | 2024 |
|---|---|---|---|---|---|---|---|---|---|---|---|---|
| Baseball (Nippon Professional Baseball) | 51.7% | 45.1% | 48.4% | 42.8% | 45.2% | 48.1% | 42.8% | 45.5% | 37.9% | 45.9% | 53.1% | 51.8% |
| Association football (J. League) (WE League) | 22.8% | 28.9% | 36.0% | 26.2% | 25.0% | 24.8% | 22.8% | 26.0% | 17.6% | 24.0% | 24.3% | 24.4% |
| Sumo wrestling (Ōzumō) | 17.1% | 15.1% | 15.8% | 21.8% | 27.3% | 20.7% | 20.1% | 21.4% | 20.0% | 20.1% | 18.5% | 20.1% |
| Do not care about sports | 24.4% | 22.0% | 18.9% | 24.0% | 18.2% | 18.2% | 18.7% | 20.2% | 27.8% | 20.3% | 22.3% | 20.0% |
| Basketball (B.League) (W League) | N/A | N/A | N/A | N/A | 6.0% | 7.4% | 6.5% | 9.1% | 6.3% | 9.6% | 8.9% | 15.2% |
| Golf (Japan Golf Tour & JLPGA Tour) | 16.9% | 19.9% | 16.0% | 13.4% | 13.7% | 13.9% | 9.4% | 15.4% | 12.8% | 13.6% | 10.4% | 12.3% |
| Tennis (Japan Open) | N/A | N/A | N/A | 20.6% | 21.7% | 18.5% | 19.8% | 20.0% | 14.0% | 13.4% | 9.9% | 10.6% |
| Boxing | 7.8% | 7.7% | 7.8% | 9.8% | 9.2% | 10.3% | 6.7% | 9.6% | 6.7% | 8.5% | 8.7% | 7.9% |
| Motor racing | 6.2% | 7.7% | 7.0% | 7.0% | 5.2% | 6.1% | 5.0% | 8.0% | 4.2% | 6.1% | 5.4% | 5.9% |
| Puroresu (pro-wrestling) | 4.2% | 3.1% | 3.5% | 4.7% | 3.8% | 4.4% | 3.3% | 4.5% | 2.2% | 3.8% | 4.0% | 4.1% |
| Others | 8.0% | 5.7% | 7.8% | 3.7% | 7.8% | 7.0% | 8.5% | 4.9% | 7.0% | 7.6% | 5.1% | 5.8% |
| Gridiron Football (X-League)^{[a]} | N/A | N/A | N/A | N/A | N/A | N/A | N/A | N/A | N/A | N/A | N/A | N/A |
| Futsal (F.League) | N/A | N/A | N/A | N/A | N/A | N/A | N/A | N/A | N/A | N/A | N/A | N/A |

Notes:

- ^a Japan has no professional Gridiron Football teams. The above means watching the US National Football League and Canadian Canadian Football League games on TV.

In addition, there are professional sports for gambling purposes; some fans enjoy them as spectator sports without betting money.

- Horse racing – 25 races have international Grade I ratings. Arima Kinen is the world's biggest betting race.
- Keirin – bicycle racing. Became an Olympic sport in 2000 in its modified form
- Kyotei – powerboat racing
- Auto Race – motorbike racing on oval tracks

== School and sport ==
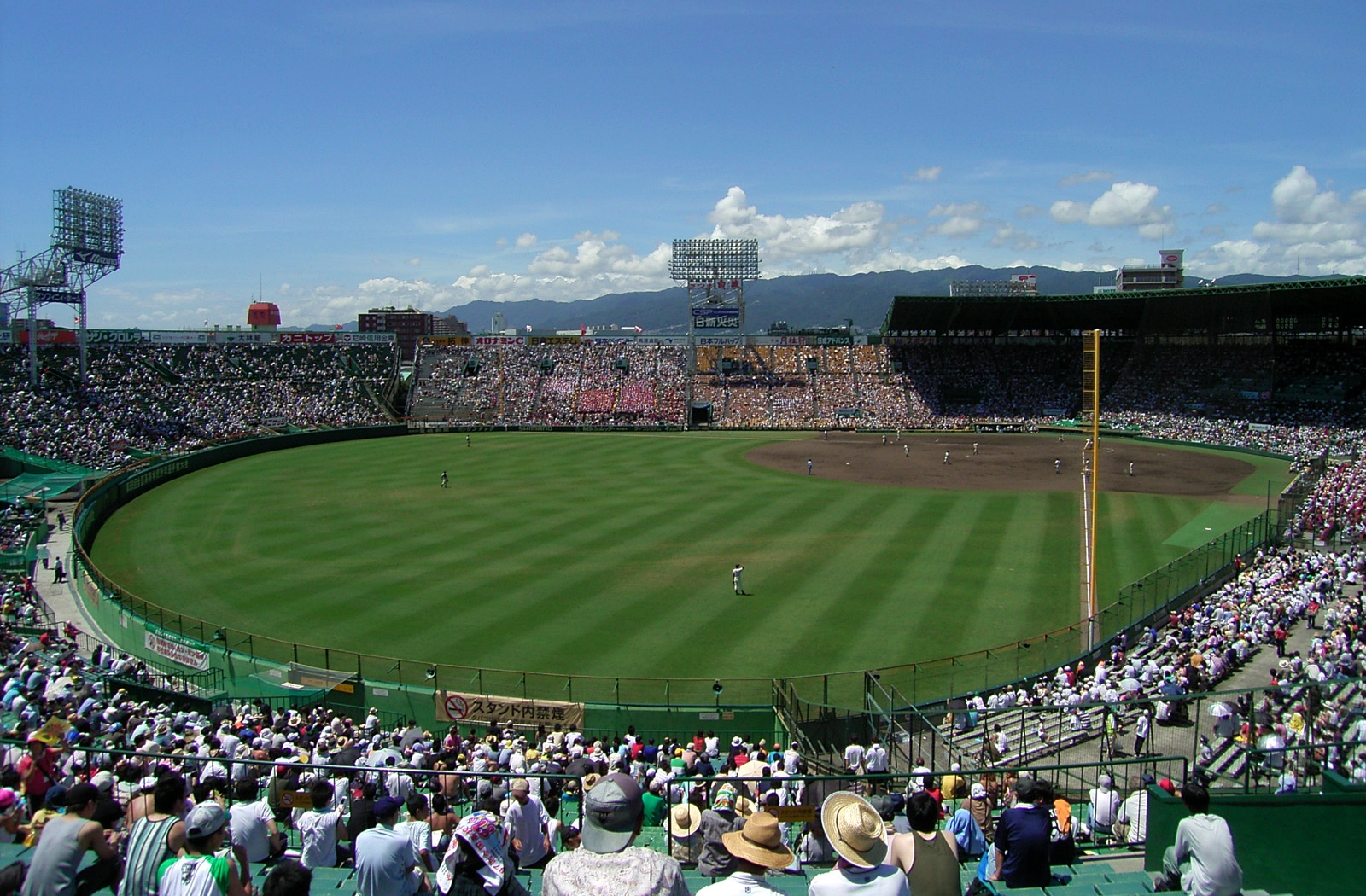
National High School Baseball Championship at Koshien Stadium

There are opportunities to play various sports for all ages, and school plays an important role in community. Kindergarten and lower elementary school students can play in a private sport club that can be joined for a moderate fee. Most martial arts can be started as little as 5 to 6 years old. When a student starts 5th grade, school offers free after-school activities for its students to participate. Middle and high schools also encourage their students to join school sport clubs.

Prefectural and national-wide level contests and tournaments are held every winter and summer for all sports. Some of the tournaments, such as National High School Baseball Championship, have a very high level of popularity among fans, comparable to professional sports.

== International competition ==
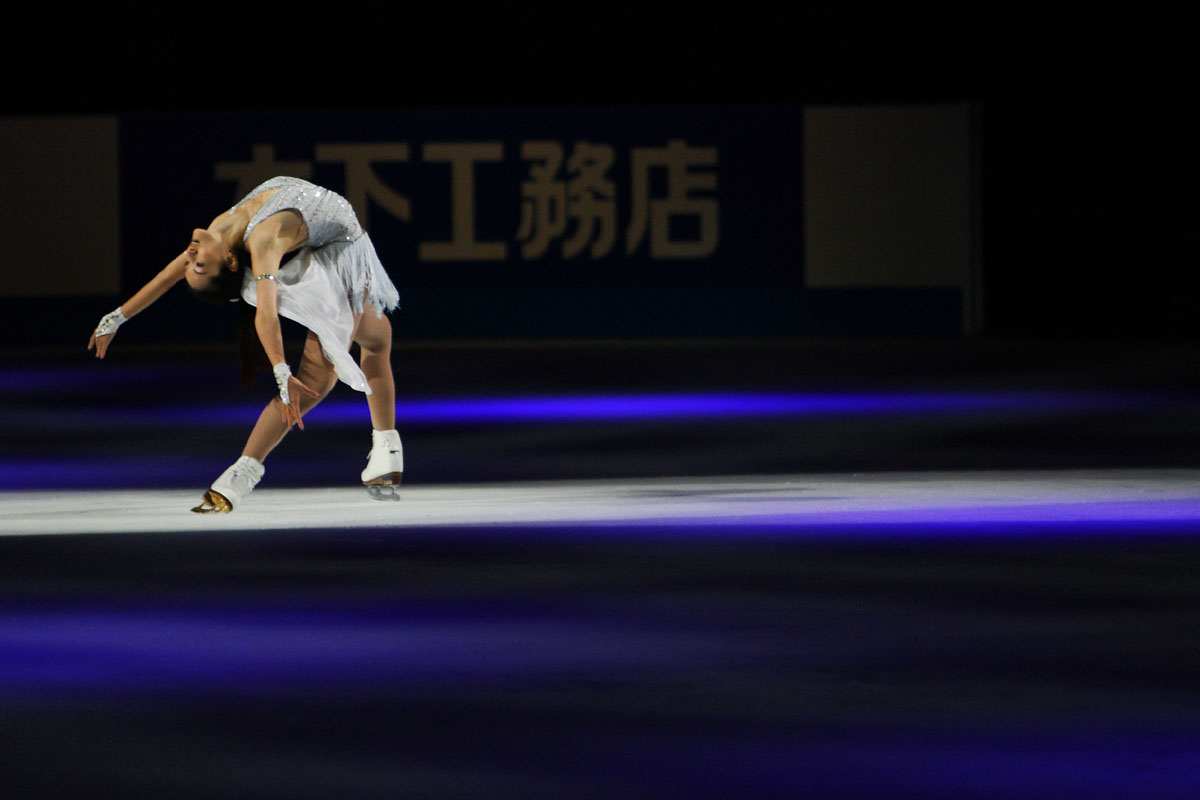
2006 Olympic Champion Shizuka Arakawa skates at the 2009 Japan Open.

The second Monday of October is a national holiday of Japan, Health and Sports Day. This date, originally October 10, commemorates the opening day of the 1964 Summer Olympics held in Tokyo. The event was documented in Tokyo Olympiad by filmmaker, Kon Ichikawa. Japan has hosted many international competitions including the 1972 Winter Olympics in Sapporo, the 1998 Winter Olympics in Nagano, 2002 FIFA World Cup, and the 2006 and 2009 World Baseball Classic. Tokyo also hosted the 2020 Summer Olympics.

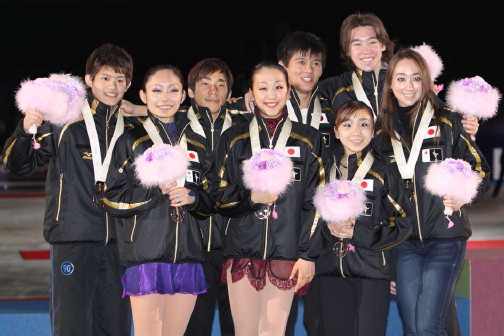
Japan's figure skating team at the 2009 World Team Trophy

The 2019 Rugby World Cup, or 'RWC 2019' was hosted by Japan. This was announced by RWCL Chairman Bernard Lapasset in Irish capital Dublin at a special IRB meeting on 28 July 2009, along with the host of the 2015 Rugby World Cup, England.

Many major figure skating events are regularly held in Japan. The Grand Prix event, the NHK Trophy, has been held in various cities throughout Japan every year since 1979. Japan has also been host of the World Figure Skating Championships and ISU Grand Prix Final numerous times. In 2009, it held the first ISU World Team Trophy in Tokyo, an event set to take place every two years. Figure skating is also a commercial success in Japan, and made-for-television competitions and ice shows like the Japan Open are broadcast across the nation. Along with countries such as the United States, Canada, and Russia, Japan is widely considered to be a leading country in the sport.

== Individual sports ==
=== Sumo ===
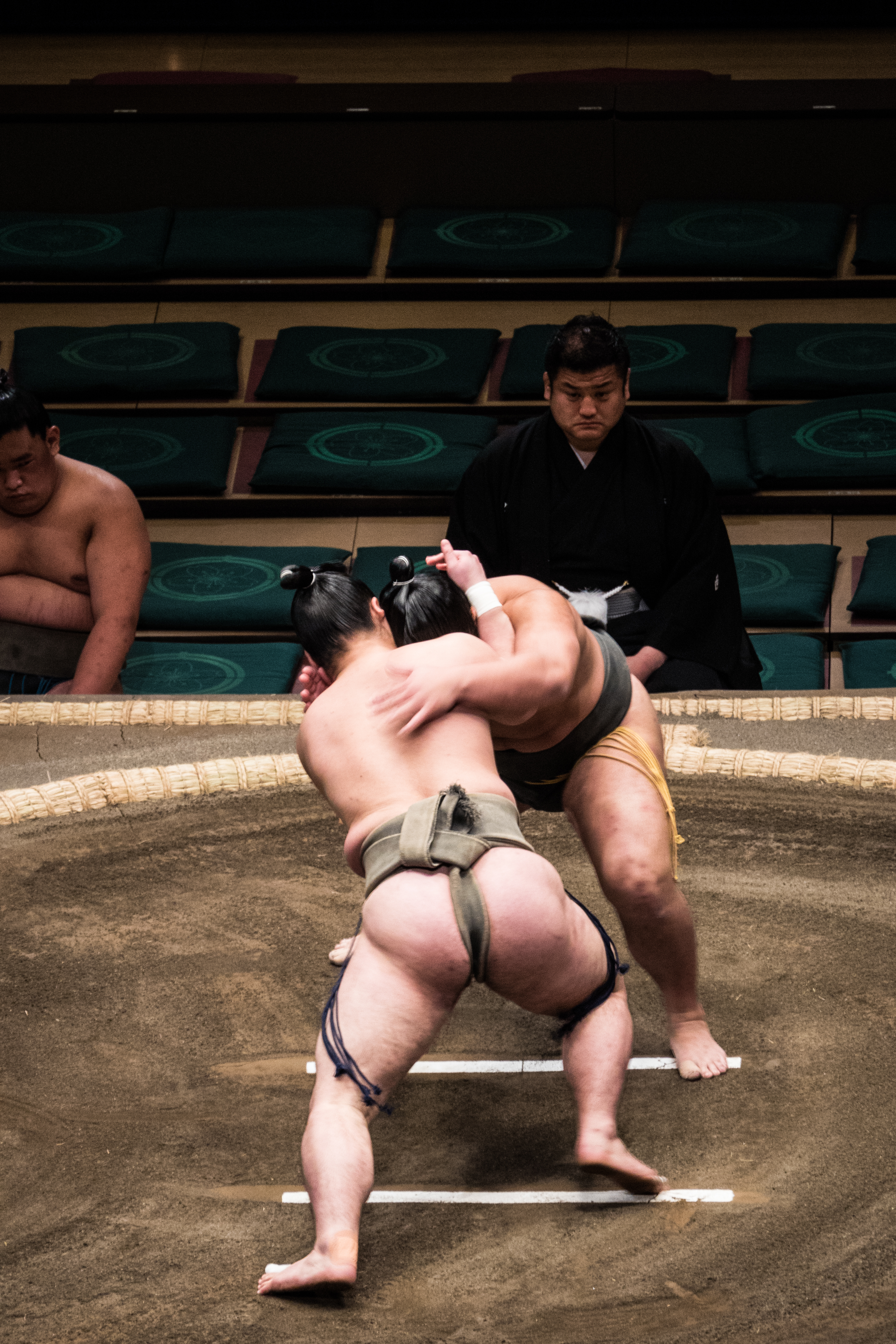
Sumo wrestling

Sumo wrestling is the national sport in Japan. Sumo wrestling is believed to have originated in Japan, with its governing body being the Japan Sumo Association. It is considered a gendai budō, which refers to modern Japanese martial art, but the sport has a history spanning many centuries. Many ancient traditions have been preserved in sumo, and even today the sport includes many ritual elements, such as the use of salt purification, from Shinto.

Life as a wrestler is highly regimented, with rules regulated by the Japan Sumo Association. Most sumo wrestlers are required to live in communal sumo training stables, known in Japanese as heya, where all aspects of their daily lives – from meals to their manner of dress – are dictated by strict tradition.

=== Boxing ===
The history of boxing in Japan began in 1854 when Matthew Perry landed at Shimoda, Shizuoka soon after the Convention of Kanagawa. At that time, American sailors often engaged in sparring matches on board their ships, with their fists wrapped in thin leather. It was the first example of boxing conveyed to Japan. In addition, an ōzeki-ranked sumo wrestler named Koyanagii (小柳 常吉) was summoned by the shogunate, and ordered to fight a boxer and a wrestler from the United States. There were three fought matches, using different martial arts' styles, before Perry and other spectators. Koyanagi reportedly won.

In Japan, every professional boxer must contract with a manager under the Japan Boxing Commission (JBC) rules, and is required to belong to a boxing gym which has exclusive management rights for boxers as a member of each regional subsidiary body of Japan Pro Boxing Association under the Japan's conventional gym system. Two professional boxers belonging to the same gym have not been allowed to fight against each other unless one of them transfers to other gym, because it might disrupt the gym system. However, it is often quite difficult for boxers to transfer between the gyms due to the matters on transfer fees, match fees and so on.

=== Figure skating ===
In the 2009–10 season all four reigning World Champion singles skaters were from Japan. Figure skating events in Japan are well attended and TV broadcasts attract a large audience. The major surge in its popularity has come mainly within the past decade with the success of its native skaters, but there have been avid fans in the country for international skaters for much longer. Skater Dorothy Hamill is known to have received pearls from the Japanese royal family in the 1970s. Figure Skaters in Japan also enjoy some level of celebrity – some like Mao Asada and Yuzuru Hanyu (the first Japanese male figure skater to win an Olympic gold medal) becoming household names and gaining large sponsorships. The NHK Trophy, a major figure skating Grand-Prix event, is hosted in Japan every year.

=== Skiing ===
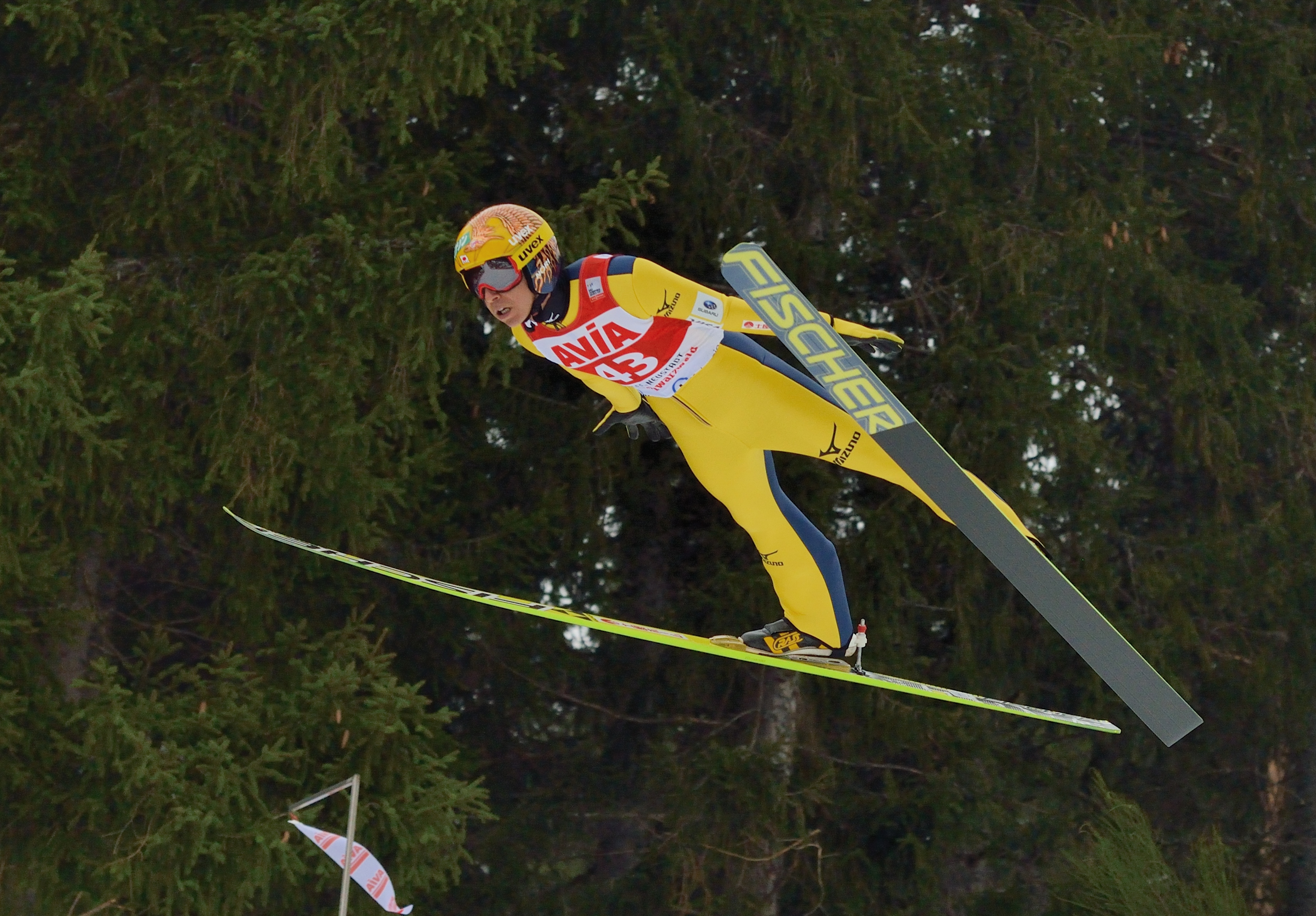
Noriaki Kasai jumping on the Hochfirst Ski Jump, Titisee-Neustadt during the 2015–16 FIS Ski Jumping World Cup

Skiing is also popular and taught in schools in northern parts of the mountainous country. In particular, Japan has been producing good ski jumpers since the Sapporo Olympics in 1972, when Japanese athletes won all three medals in the 70 Meter Jumps with Yukio Kasaya getting the first gold for Japan in Winter Olympics. In the 1990s, Noriaki Kasai and Kazuyoshi Funaki scored many wins in the FIS Ski Jumping World Cup. More recently, Ryoyu Kobayashi won the overall title in the 2018–19 season. In the women's arena, the four-time season champion Sara Takanashi is renewing her world record of most wins in the World Cup.

=== Table tennis ===
Table tennis is popular both as competition and recreation. From the 1950s to 1970s, Japan was one of the strongest countries in the world, producing 13 World singles champions. After long struggling years, they regained momentum in the 2010s and won many medals in the World Championships and the Olympic Games, though experiencing difficulty in surpassing China.

=== Motorsport ===
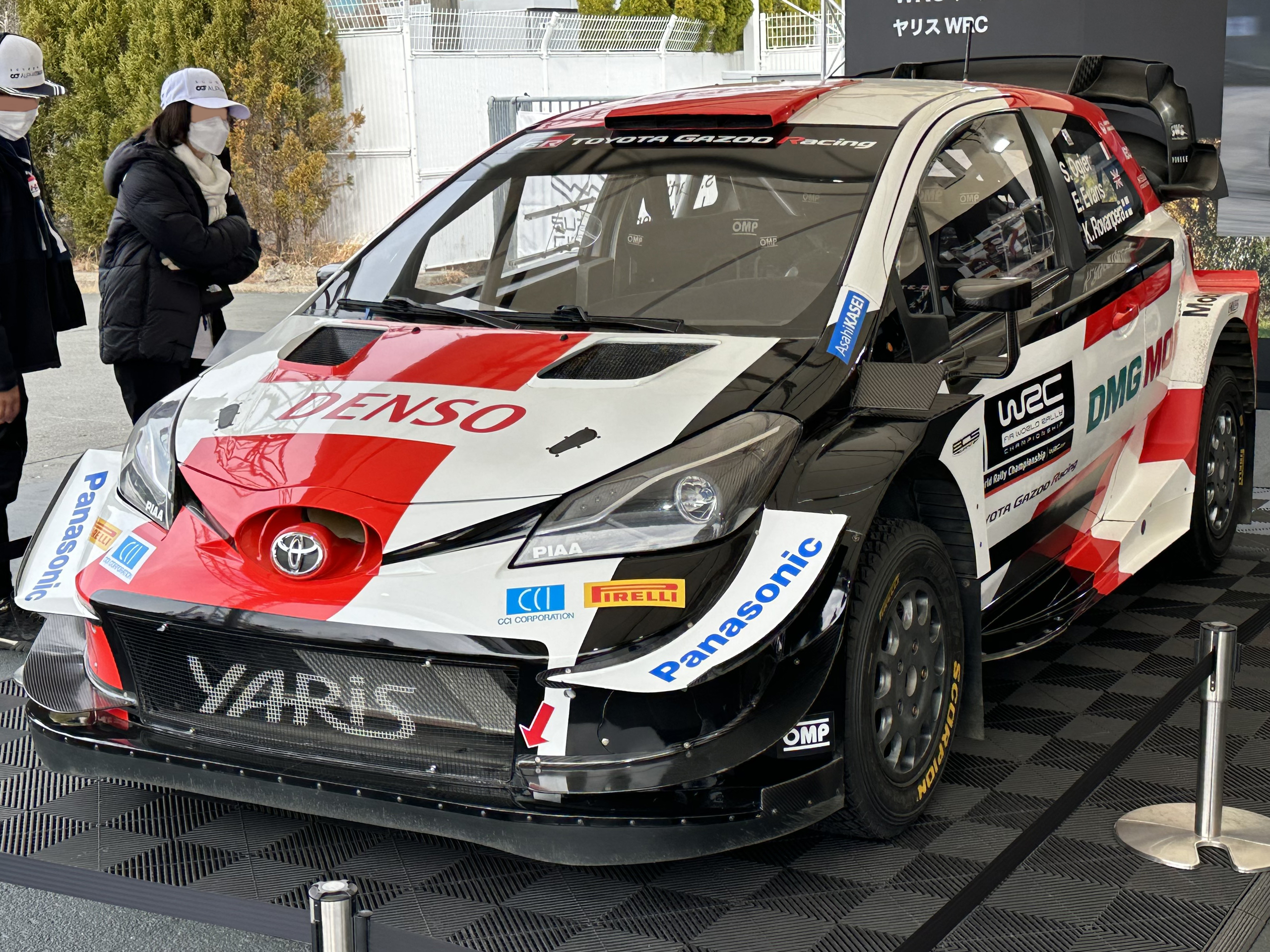
Toyota Gazoo Racing WRT

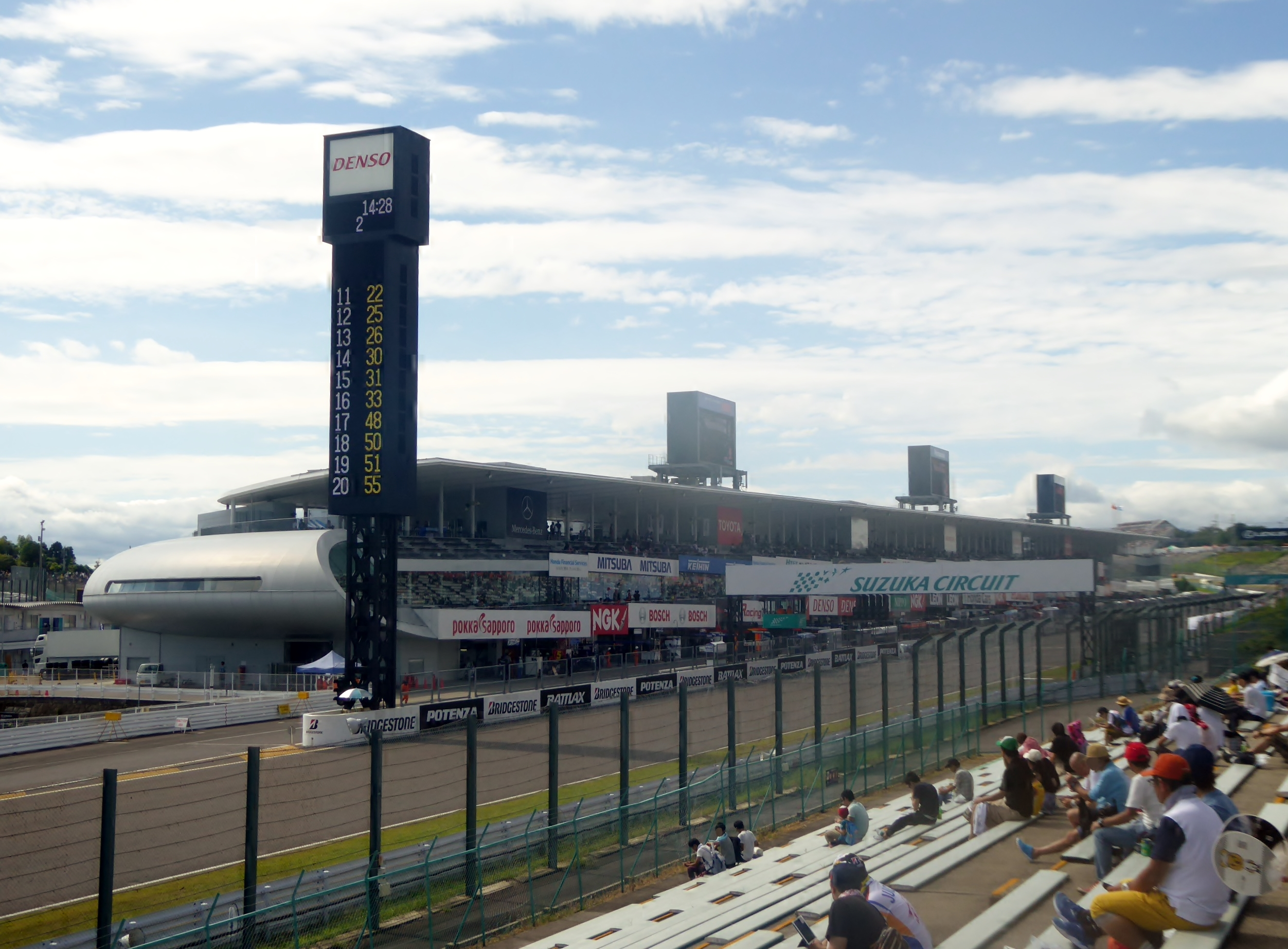
Suzuka Circuit

- Auto racing
  - Sports car racing – see Super GT, Japan Le Mans Challenge, Suzuka 1000 km, Fuji 1000 km
  - Formula racing – see Super Formula, Japanese Grand Prix, Pacific Grand Prix, JAF Grand Prix and Indy Japan 300. Takuma Sato won the Indianapolis 500 twice, in 2017 and 2020.
  - Touring car racing – see Japanese Touring Car Championship, FIA WTCC Race of Japan
  - Stock car racing – see NASCAR Thunder 100 and Coca-Cola 500.
  - Street racing – see Shuto Expressway
  - Drag racing
  - Truck racing
  - Drifting – see D1 Grand Prix
  - Rallying – see Rally Japan
- Motorcycle sport
  - Grand Prix motorcycle racing – see Japanese motorcycle Grand Prix and Pacific motorcycle Grand Prix
  - Endurance racing – see Suzuka 8 Hours
  - Superbike racing – All Japan Road Race Championship
  - Auto Race
- Boat racing
  - Kyōtei
    - Star Racing

=== Mixed martial arts ===
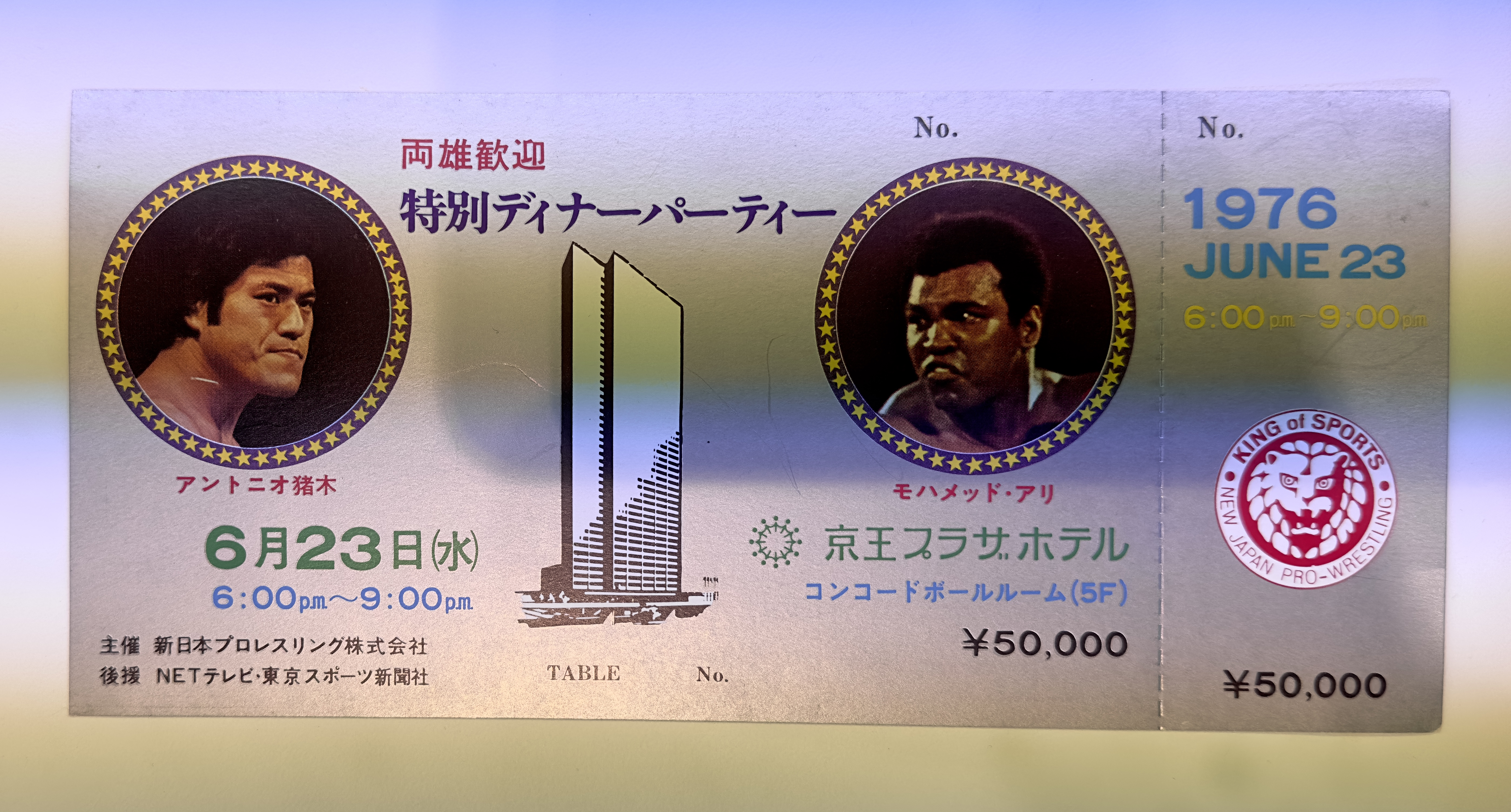
Muhammad Ali vs. Antonio Inoki, New Japan Pro-Wrestling Ticket

Mixed martial arts (MMA) has been the most popular combat sport in Japan since the 1970s, and the country is considered a world power. The first example of this sport in Japan was the historic fight between Japanese fighter Antonio Inoki and American boxer Muhammad Ali. The classic match between a professional boxer and a professional wrestler turned sour when each refused to engage in the other's fighting style, and after a 15-round stalemate the match was declared a draw.

The Japanese promotion PRIDE Fighting Championships was one of the most important organizations in the world, and was called "the Mecca of MMA" because it brought together the best fighters in Japan and the world until its demise in 2007. Today there are promotions such as Rizin Fighting Federation (the most important in the country), Pancrase, Shooto and ZST.

=== Others ===
- Aikido
- Takagari (falconry)
- Iaido
- Judo
- Jujutsu
- Karate in Japan
- Kemari
- Kendo
- Kenjutsu
- Kyūdō (Japanese archery)
- Naginata
- Sumo
- Yabusame
- Ballet

== Popular team sports ==
=== Baseball ===
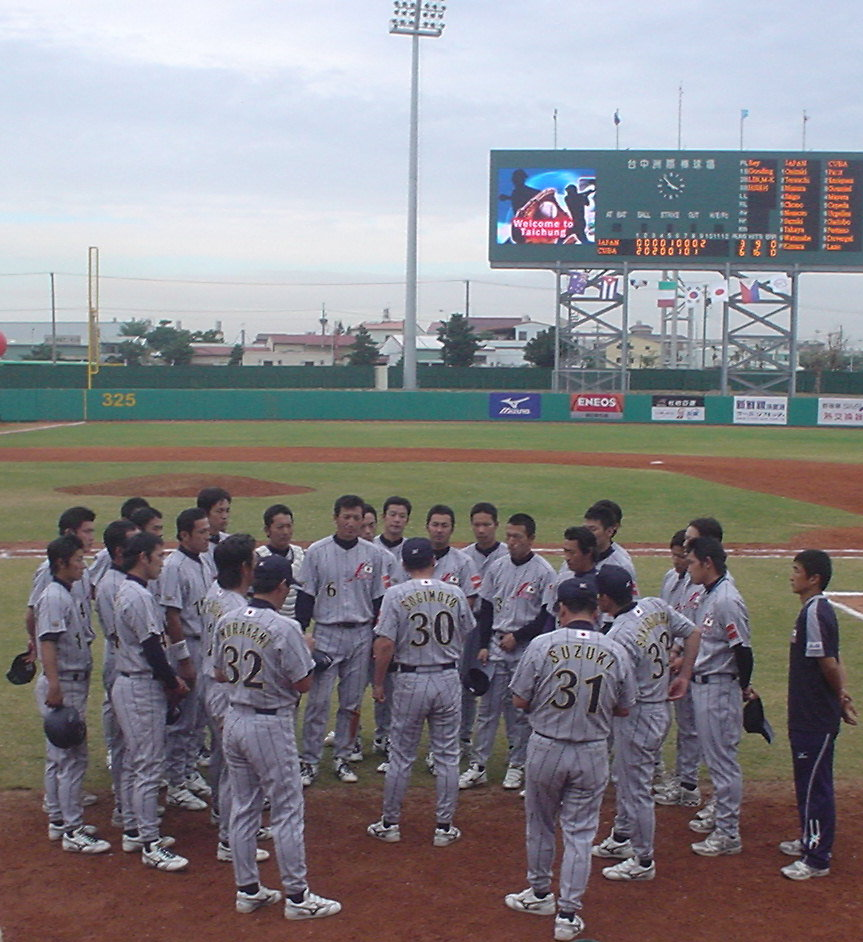
The Japan national baseball team huddles around their manager after losing to Cuba in the 2006 Intercontinental Cup.

Baseball is historically the most popular team sport in Japan. It was introduced to Japan in 1872 by Horace Wilson, who taught at the Kaisei School in Tokyo. The first baseball team was called the Shimbashi Athletic Club and was established in 1878. Baseball has been a popular sport ever since. It is called yakyū (野球) in Japanese, combining the characters for "field" and "ball".

Hiroshi Hiraoka, who was in the United States studying engineering, introduced the game to his co-workers at Japan's national railways in 1878. He and his co-workers created the first baseball team, the Shimbashi Athletic Club, and dominated other teams which popped up in Japan. However, it was not until 1896 that a team from Ichikō, the elite University of Tokyo preparatory school, defeated a team from the Yokohama Country & Athletic Club 29 to 4 that the sport took a dominant hold in Japanese popular culture. The match was the first recorded international baseball game in Asia. After that victory, several other universities in Japan adopted the sport, and it quickly spread throughout Japan. Since then, teams from Japan have traveled to learn from their American counterparts. Waseda University was one of the first teams to cross the ocean to improve their skills. In 1905, the team traveled to the United States, where it played college teams from around the country. Other universities in Japan made similar trips, and U.S. teams traveled to Japan to play.

From 1913 to 1922, American MLB stars visited Japan and played against university teams. They also held clinics on technique. Herb Hunter, a retired major league player, made eight trips to Japan, from 1922 to 1932 to organize games and coaching clinics.

Baseball is also played in Japan's junior and senior high schools. Each year in March and August, two tournaments are held at Koshien Stadium for senior high school teams that win a prefecture tournament. References to high school baseball (kōkō yakyū (高校野球)) generally refer to the two annual baseball tournaments, played by high schools nationwide culminating at a final showdown at Hanshin Kōshien Stadium in Nishinomiya, Japan. They are organized by the Japan High School Baseball Federation in association with Mainichi Shimbun for the National High School Baseball Invitational Tournament in the spring (also known as "Spring Kōshien"), and Asahi Shimbun for the National High School Baseball Championship in the summer (also known as "Summer Kōshien"). These nationwide tournaments enjoy widespread popularity, arguably equal to or greater than professional baseball. Qualifying tournaments are often televised locally and each game of the final stage at Kōshien is televised nationally on NHK. The tournaments have become a national tradition, and large numbers of frenzied students and parents travel from hometowns to cheer for their local team. It is a common sight to see players walking off the field in tears after being eliminated from the tournament by a loss.

=== Association football ===
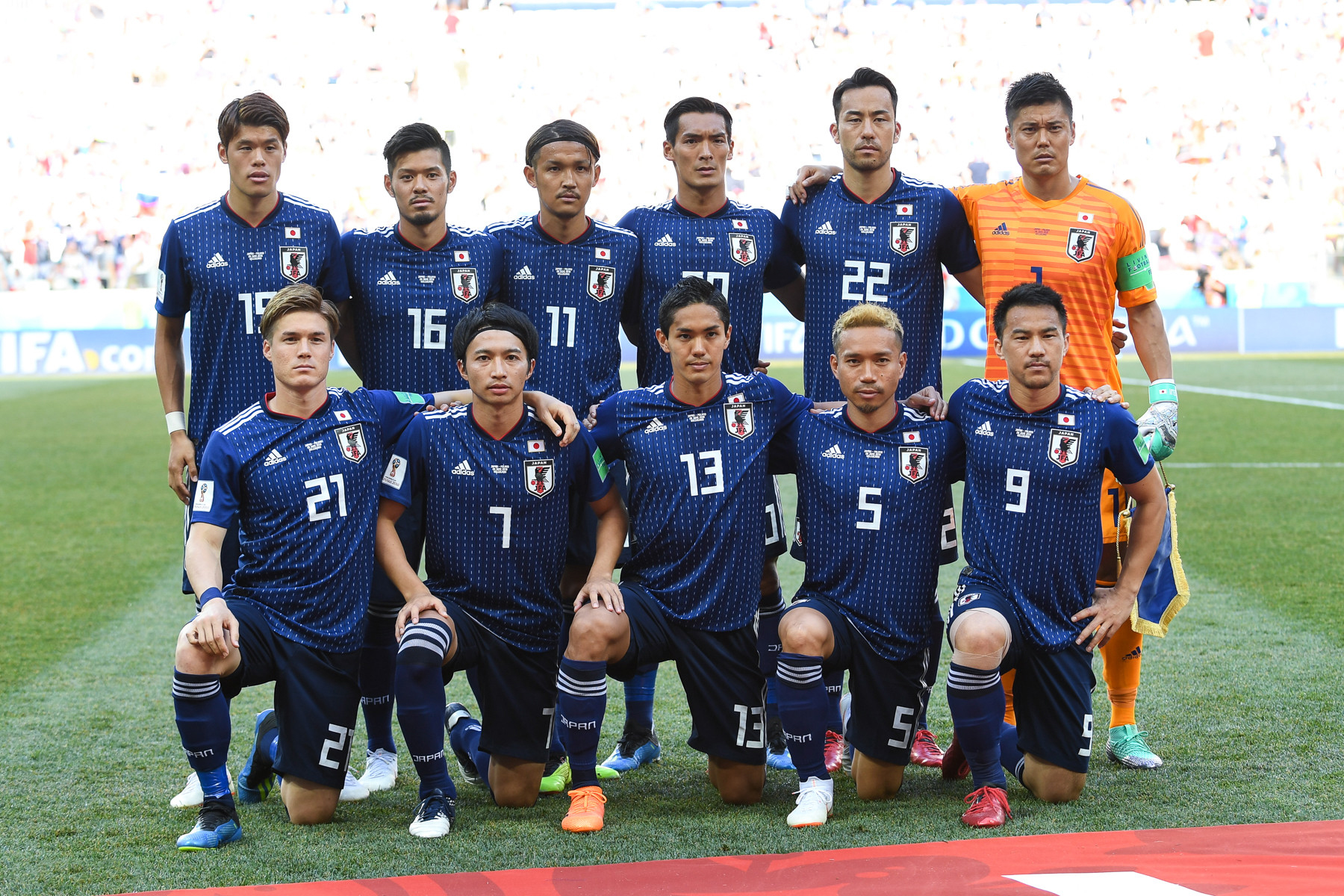
Japan national football team

Association football is the second most popular team sport in Japan, behind baseball. The Japan Football Association (JFA) is the governing body of Japanese football. The JFA organizes the men's, women's, and futsal national teams.

Association football was introduced to Japan during the Meiji period by O-yatoi gaikokujin, foreign advisors hired by the Japanese government, along with many other foreign sports, like baseball. The first Japanese football club is considered to be Tokyo Shūkyū-dan, founded in 1917, which is now competing in the Tokyo Prefectural amateur league.

In the 1920s, football associations were organized and regional tournaments began in universities and high schools, especially in Tokyo. In the 1930s, the Japan national football team was organized and drew 3–3 with China to win their first title at the Far Eastern Championship Games. The Japan national team also competed in the 1936 Berlin Olympic Games, the team had a first victory in an Olympic game with a 3–2 win over powerful Sweden.

The Japan national team is very successful at an international level, and has competed in the 1998, 2002, 2006, 2010, 2014, 2018, 2022 and 2026 FIFA World Cups. Its best result was reaching the Round of 16 in 2002, 2010, 2018, and 2022. The Japanese national team has also competed in six AFC Asian Cups, with the team being the Champions in 1992, 2000, 2004 and 2011 AFC Asian Cups. The team's highest ranking was 9th in the world in February 1998. Japan has competed in many other footballing events including the Confederations Cup, the East Asian Football Championship, and the Copa América.

The J.League is the most popular football league in Japan and has grown rapidly in just a few decades-with teams such as FC Tokyo and Kashima Antlers regularly competing in continental competition and the league drawing the talents of Andrés Iniesta and Fernando Torres.

The women's national team has enjoyed major success at the World Cup, winning the 2011 edition in Germany and finishing as runner-up in the 2015 edition in Canada.

The national team's colors are blue and white, Japan's main colors in most international sporting competitions.

=== Volleyball ===
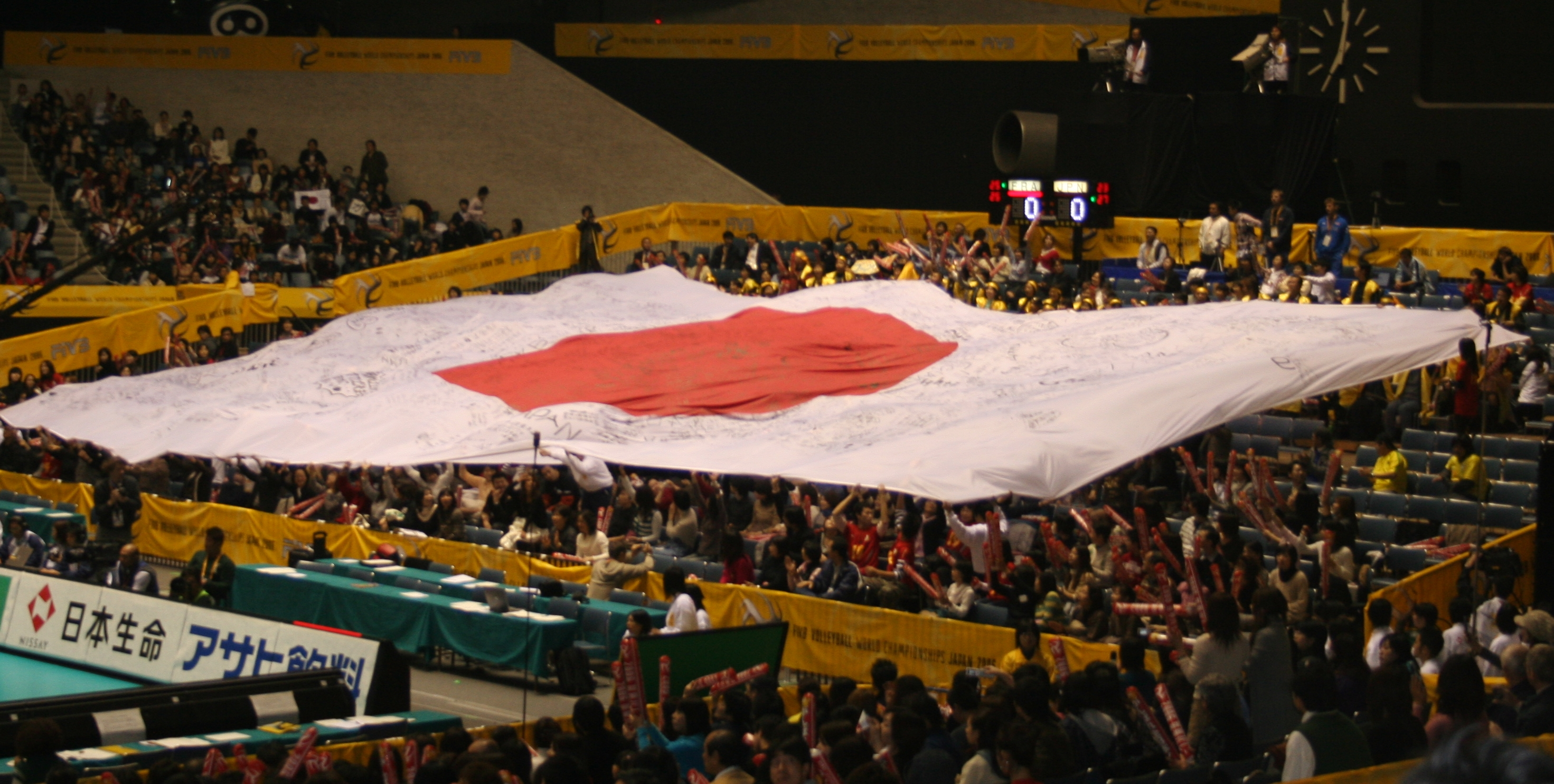
Japan national volleyball team fans in World Championship 2010

Volleyball is popular in Japan, where the sport enjoys much coverage by national broadcasters. The sport is played by many junior and senior high school students. The top regional teams play in the Japanese Volleyball League. Since 2006, Japan is the permanent host of the FIVB Volleyball World Cups.

At the 1964 Olympic Games on home soil, Japan became the first country in history to win Olympic gold in women's volleyball. The women's national team has since achieved Olympic podium placements multiple times, including an additional gold medal in 1976. The women's team now ranks seventh in the world. The men's national team has been less successful in spite of medals at the first three Olympics, including gold in 1972, but have qualified for the last two Olympics in 2020 and 2024.

Haikyu!!, a manga and anime series about high school volleyball, has gained a significant amount of popularity all around the world.

Japan featured a women's national team in beach volleyball that competed at the 2018–2020 AVC Beach Volleyball Continental Cup.

=== Basketball ===
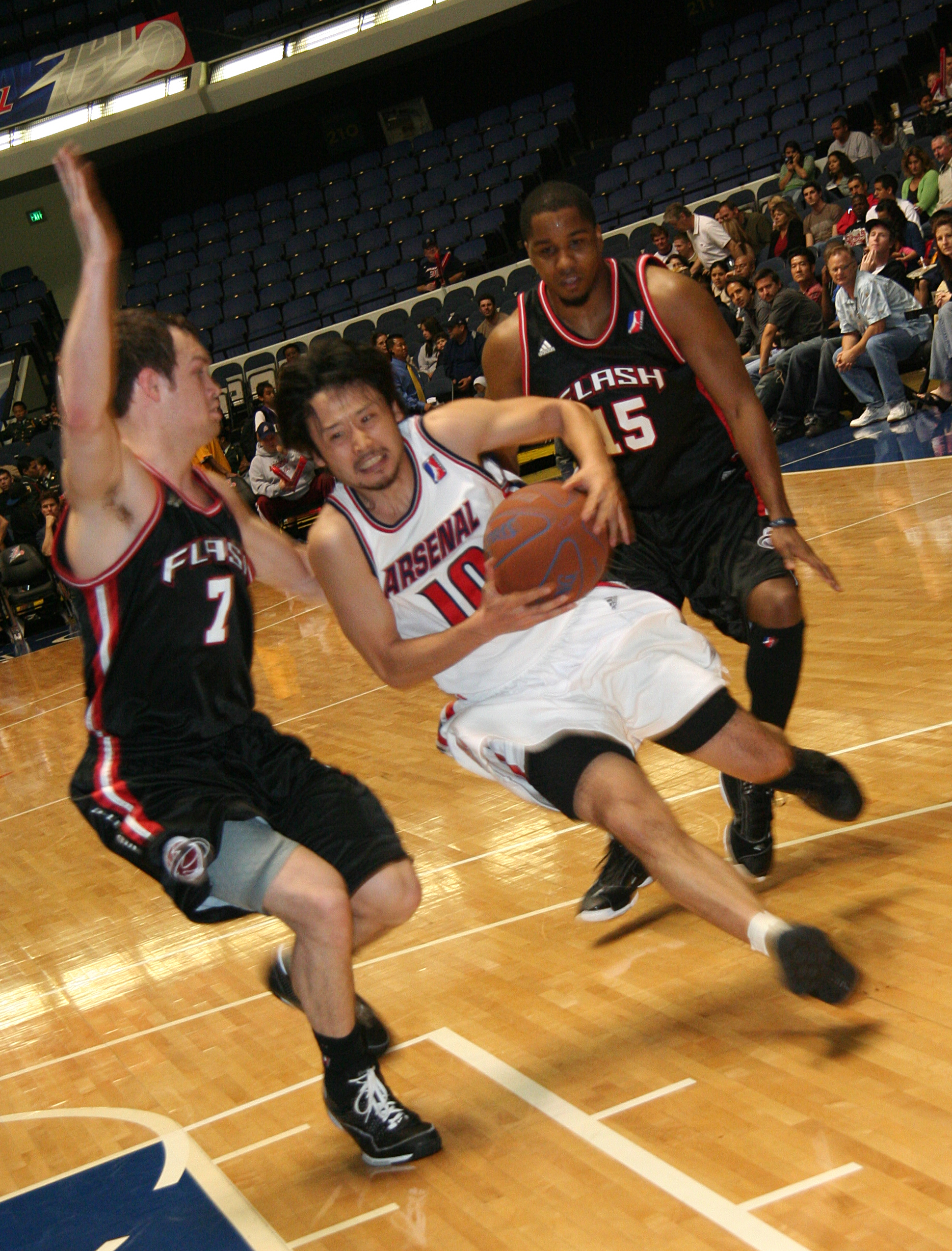
Yuta Tabuse is one of Japan's prime basketball players.

Especially since the emergence of Yuta Tabuse and Takuya Kawamura, basketball has received a recent revival and become a popular sport in Japan. The Japan national basketball team won the FIBA Asia Championship twice and has qualified for the event 25 out of 26 times. Japan was host to the 2006 FIBA World Championship which was played in the host cities of Hamamatsu, Hiroshima, Saitama, Sapporo and Sendai and on 9 December 2017, Japan was announced as co-host the 2023 FIBA Basketball World Cup with Philippines and Indonesia with some matches being hosted in the host city of Okinawa City.

The prime basketball league in the country is the B.League.

In 2010 the Japan Basketball Association recognized Takehiko Inoue, the creator of Slam Dunk, for the series' role in popularizing the sport in Japan as part of its 80th anniversary celebrations.

In 2019, Rui Hachimura was selected ninth overall in the draft by the Washington Wizards of the NBA. He is a son between a Beninese father and Japanese mother.

=== Rugby union ===
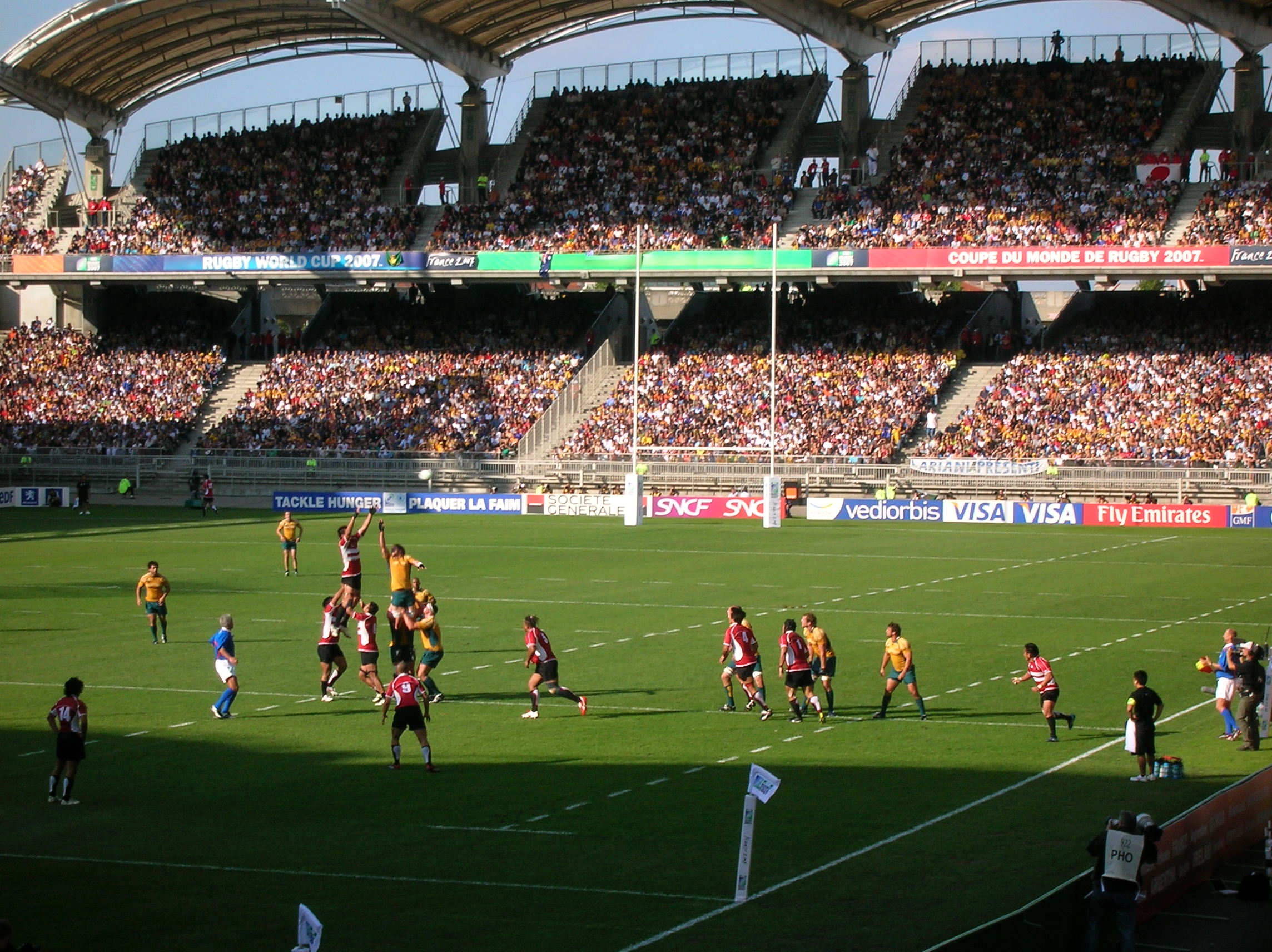
Australia playing Japan (red) during the 2007 Rugby World Cup

Rugby union is a moderately popular sport in Japan. The Japanese national rugby union team, controlled by the Japan Rugby Football Union, has been to every Rugby World Cup since 1987. The country hosted the Rugby World Cup in 2019, where they qualified for the quarter-finals for the first time. Japan's first win in the Rugby World Cup was against Zimbabwe in 1991, which was also one of the national team's first wins. They also caused significant upsets in the 2015 World Cup, beating two-time champions at the time South Africa, and the 2019 World Cup, beating second ranked in the world Ireland 19–12. The Japanese rugby team has been playing in international tournaments since the 1930s.

In 2016, the Sunwolves joined Super Rugby as that competition's first Japanese team and first from the Northern Hemisphere. Super Rugby began in 1996 as Super 12, involving franchised teams from Australia, New Zealand, and South Africa, and had involved only those countries until 2016. The competition became Super 14 in 2006 when it added two teams, and adopted its current name of Super Rugby when it expanded to 15 teams in 2011. The 2016 season saw the addition of three new teams, including the first-ever entry from Argentina. The Sunwolves play home matches mostly at Chichibunomiya Rugby Stadium in Tokyo, with select "home" matches also played in Singapore.

==== History ====
The first recorded instance of rugby being played in Japan was in 1874, when British sailors staged a game in Yokohama. The sport was introduced to students at Keio university in 1899, by Professor Edward Bramwell Clarke and Tanaka Ginnosuke. Japan's first international match took place on 31 January 1932, when a trade delegation from Canada brought the Canada national rugby union team, who were also playing their first game. The Japanese won 9–8.

In 2015 an amateur form of mud tag rugby was invented.

=== Calendar of the major men's and women's professional sports leagues in Japan ===
| January | February | March | April | May | June | July | August | September | October | November | December |
|---|---|---|---|---|---|---|---|---|---|---|---|
| | | NPB (Baseball) | | | | | | | | | |
| J1 League (Soccer) | | | | | | | J1 League (Soccer) | | | | |
| SV.League Men's (Volleyball) | | | | | | | | | SV.League Men's (Volleyball) | | |
| B.League (Basketball) | | | | | | | | | B.League (Basketball) | | |
| Japan Rugby League One (Rugby Union) | | | | | | | | | | | JRLO (Rugby Union) |

| January | February | March | April | May | June | July | August | September | October | November | December |
|---|---|---|---|---|---|---|---|---|---|---|---|
| WE League (Soccer) | | | | | | | | WE League (Soccer) | | | |
| SV.League Women's (Volleyball) | | | | | | | | | SV.League Women's (Volleyball) | | |
| Women's Japan Basketball League(Basketball) | | | | | | | | | Women's Japan Basketball League(Basketball) | | |
| All-Japan Women's Rugby Football Championship (Rugby Union) | | | | | | | | | | | |

== Other team sports ==
=== Handball ===
The Japanese national handball teams are controlled by the Japan Handball Association.

=== Ice hockey ===
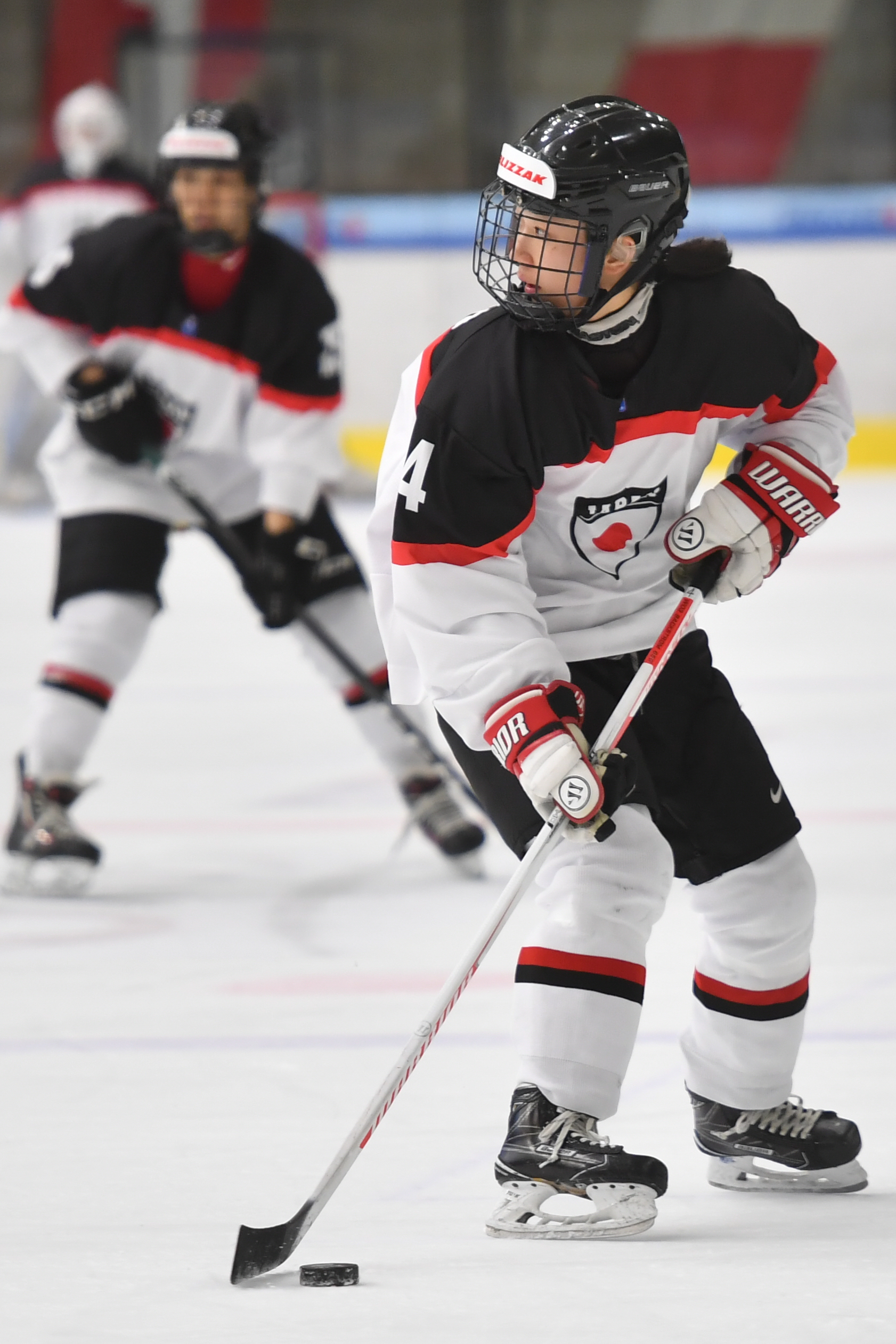
Japan women's national ice hockey team

Ice hockey is a minor sport but growing in popularity. Currently, four Japanese teams compete in the Asia League Ice Hockey.

=== American football ===
The X-League is the top league in Japan. It was founded in 1971, it has 60 teams split into four divisions. The final game is the Japan X Bowl.

In 1999 Japan won the first ever 1999 IFAF World Championship, and also won in the 2003 IFAF World Championship. Japan hosted the 2007 IFAF World Championship, but placed 2nd to the United States. Japan placed 3rd in the 2011 IFAF World Championship.

Additionally, Japan has eight major college football leagues. These leagues are the top level of college football in the country, with the East and West champions playing in the annual Koshien Bowl in Nishinomiya. The eight leagues are:

- Chushikoku Collegiate American football Association
- Hokkaido American football Association
- Hokuriku Collegiate American football League
- Kansai Collegiate American football League
- Kantoh Collegiate American football Association
- Kyūshū Collegiate American football Association
- Tohoku Collegiate American football Association
- Tokai Collegiate American football Association

The winners of the Japan X Bowl and Koshien Bowl play each other in the Rice Bowl.

=== Lacrosse ===
The Japan men's national lacrosse team has qualified for the World Lacrosse Championship eight consecutive times (1994–2022). At the most recent event (2022), it finished 5th out of 23. They defeated Team England 7–6 in double overtime with 19-year-old Rinta Fujioka scoring the game-winner.

Japan has sent national teams to the Under-19 World Lacrosse Championships.

== Original sports ==
- Ekiden
- Keirin
- Gateball
- Soft Tennis
- K-1
- Pride FC
- Park golf
- Rubber Baseball
- Sports fukiya
- Sports Chanbara AKA Spochan
- Bo-Taoshi

== New sports ==
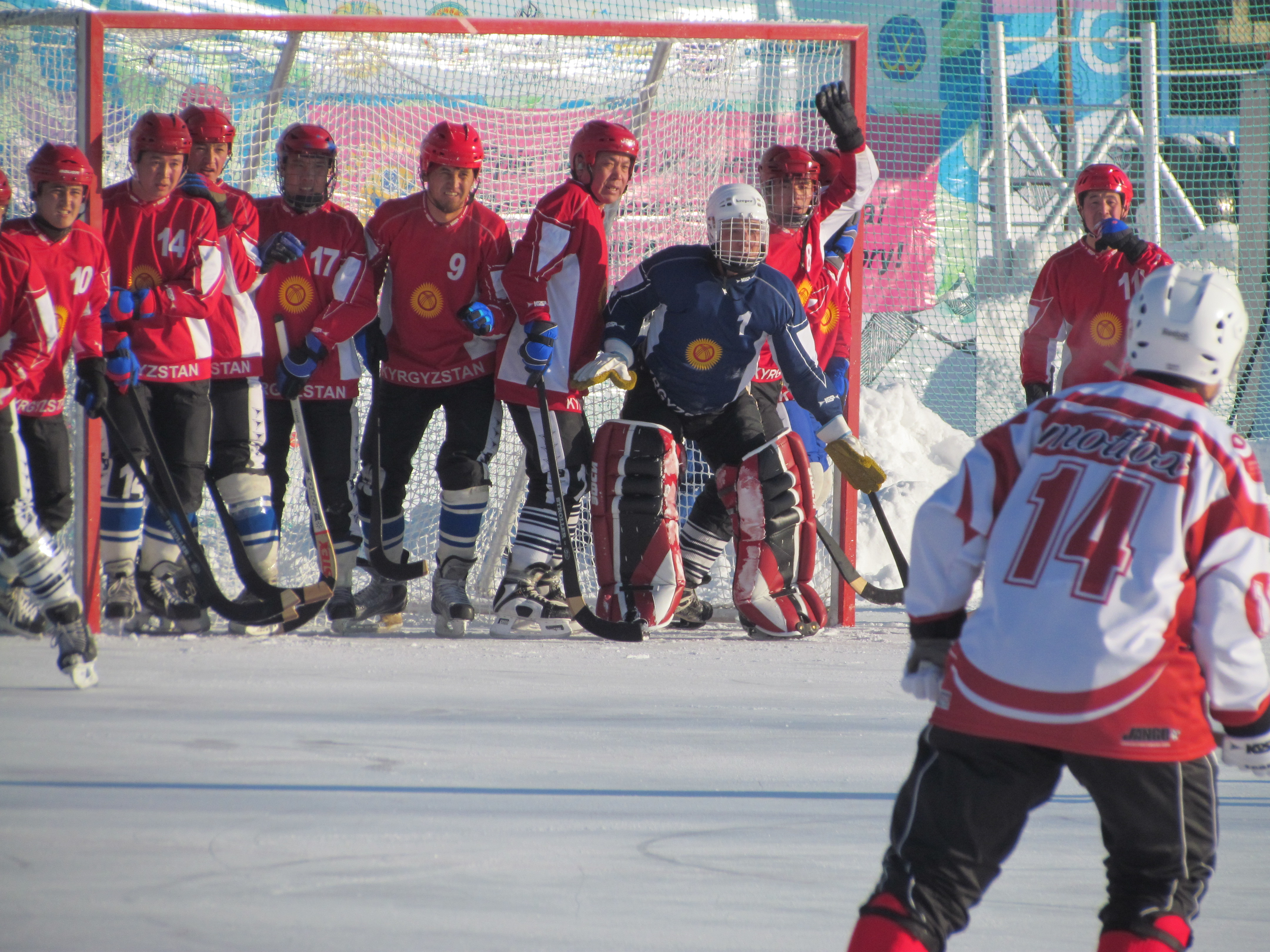
Japan in white against Kyrgyzstan in bandy

Japan Bandy Federation was established in 2011 and the same year entered Federation of International Bandy. JBF sent a team to 2012 Bandy World Championship and has participated ever since. Already in 2012 they started having plans to build a full-sized bandy arena similar to Medeu. In 2017 a successful deal was struck with Shintoku on Hokkaido, where the new venue will open in December 2017. Many cities are interested in hosting teams. In terms of licensed athletes, bandy is the second biggest winter sport in the world.

== See also ==
- List of sports governing bodies in Japan
- List of Japanese sportspeople
- List of stadiums in Japan
- List of Japanese football champions
- List of Japan international footballers
- Lists of foreign footballers in Japan
- List of football clubs in Japan
- List of women's football clubs in Japan
- List of baseball parks in Japan
- List of Japanese baseball players
- List of Major League Baseball players from Japan
- List of Japanese records in swimming
- List of Japan women ODI cricketers
- List of Japan Davis Cup team representatives
- List of professional sports teams in Japan
- List of professional wrestling promotions in Japan
