= 1922 Emperor's Cup final =

1922 Emperor's Cup Final
Nagoya Shukyu-Dan	Hiroshima Koto-Shihan
1	0
- Date: November 26, 1922
- Venue: Toshima Shihan Ground, Tokyo

1922 Emperor's Cup Final was the second final of the Emperor's Cup competition. The final was played at Toshima Shihan Ground in Tokyo on November 26, 1922. Nagoya Shukyu-Dan won the championship.

== Overview ==
Nagoya Shukyu-Dan won their 1st title, by defeating Hiroshima Koto-Shihan 1–0.

== Match details ==
November 26, 1922

Nagoya Shukyu-Dan	1–0	Hiroshima Koto-Shihan
? (?)

Toshima Shihan Ground

== See also ==
- 1922 Emperor's Cup
