= Tokyo Koto-Shihan Ground =

Athletics stadium in Tokyo, Japan

- 東京高等師範グラウンド
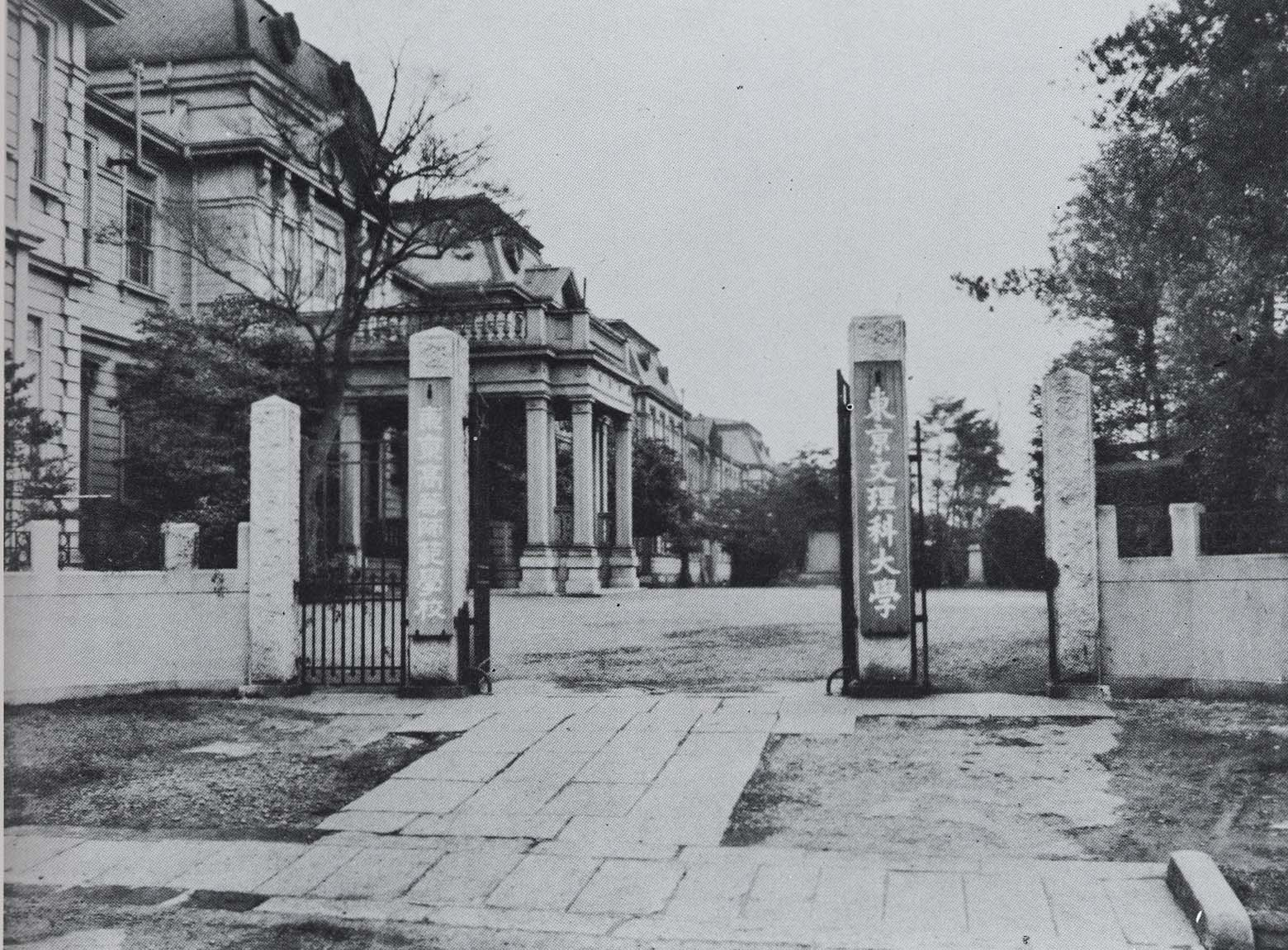
- Location: Tokyo, Japan

Tokyo Koto-Shihan Ground (東京高等師範グラウンド) was an athletic stadium in Tokyo, Japan.

It hosted the 1923 Emperor's Cup, and the final game between Astra Club and Nagoya Shukyu-Dan was played there.
