= Toshima (disambiguation) =

Toshima (豊島区) is a ward in Tokyo, Japan.

Toshima may also refer to:

== People ==
- Toshima clan, a Japanese samurai clan
- Akira Toshima (戸島 章; born 1991), Japanese football player
- Karen Toshima (1960-1988), murder victim of Durrell Collins
- Sachiro Toshima (戸嶋 祥郎; born 1995), Japanese footballer
- Yun Toshima (登島 優音; born 2006), Japanese kickboxer
- Toshima Karki, Nepali politician, a surgeon by profession and central committee member of Rastriya Swatantra Party

== Places ==
- To-shima, Tokyo (利島), a village in Ōshima Subprefecture, Tokyo Metropolis, Japan
- Toshima, Kagoshima (十島村), a village in Kagoshima Prefecture, Japan
- Toshima Incineration Plant, a waste treatment plant located in Kami-ikebukuro
- Toshima Station, a railway station in Tahara, Aichi Prefecture, Japan
- Tōshima Station, a railway station in Nanbu, Yamanashi Prefecture, Japan
- Toshima Shihan Ground, an athletic stadium in Tokyo, Japan

== See also ==
- Toshimasa, a Japanese given name
