= 1923 Emperor's Cup final =

1923 Emperor's Cup Final
Astra Club	Nagoya Shukyu-Dan
2	1
- Date: February 3, 1924
- Venue: Tokyo Koto-Shihan Ground, Tokyo

1923 Emperor's Cup Final was the third final of the Emperor's Cup competition. The final was played at Tokyo Koto-Shihan Ground in Tokyo on February 3, 1924. Astra Club won the championship.

== Overview ==
Astra Club won their 1st title, by defeating defending champion, Nagoya Shukyu-Dan 2–1.

== Match details ==
February 3, 1924

Astra Club	2–1	Nagoya Shukyu-Dan
? (?) ? (?)		? (?)

Tokyo Koto-Shihan Ground

== See also ==
- 1923 Emperor's Cup
