= Goro Yamada =

Japanese footballer and manager

Goro Yamada 山田 午郎
Personal information
- Full name: Goro Yamada
- Date of birth: March 3, 1894
- Place of birth: Nihonmatsu, Fukushima, Empire of Japan
- Date of death: March 9, 1958 (aged 64)
- Place of death: Ota, Tokyo, Japan
- Position: Midfielder

Youth career
- Tokyo Aoyama Normal School

Senior career*
Years	Team	Apps	(Gls)
- Tokyo Shukyu-Dan

Managerial career
- 1925: Japan
- * Club domestic league appearances and goals

Goro Yamada (山田 午郎, Yamada Gorō; March 3, 1894 – March 9, 1958) was a Japanese football player and manager. He managed the Japan national football team.

== Playing career ==
Yamada was born in Nihonmatsu on March 3, 1894. After graduating from Tokyo Aoyama Normal School, he played for Tokyo Shukyu-Dan while working as a teacher at primary school. The club won the first Emperor's Cup in 1921. He played as right midfielder and captain.

== Coaching career ==
In 1925, Yamada became the manager for the Japan national team for the 1925 Far Eastern Championship Games in Manila. He managed 2 matches at this competition, but Japan lost in both matches (0-4, v Philippines and 0-2, v Republic of China).

== After retirement ==
In 1926, Yamada became a football journalist for Asahi Shimbun. He also served as a director of the Japan Football Association from 1924 to 1958.

On March 9, 1958, Yamada died of intracranial hemorrhage in Ota, Tokyo at the age of 64. In 2005, he was inducted into the Japan Football Hall of Fame.

== Honours ==
- Japan Football Hall of Fame: Inducted in 2005
