= Hibiya Park Ground =

Stadium in Tokyo, Japan

- 日比谷公園グラウンド
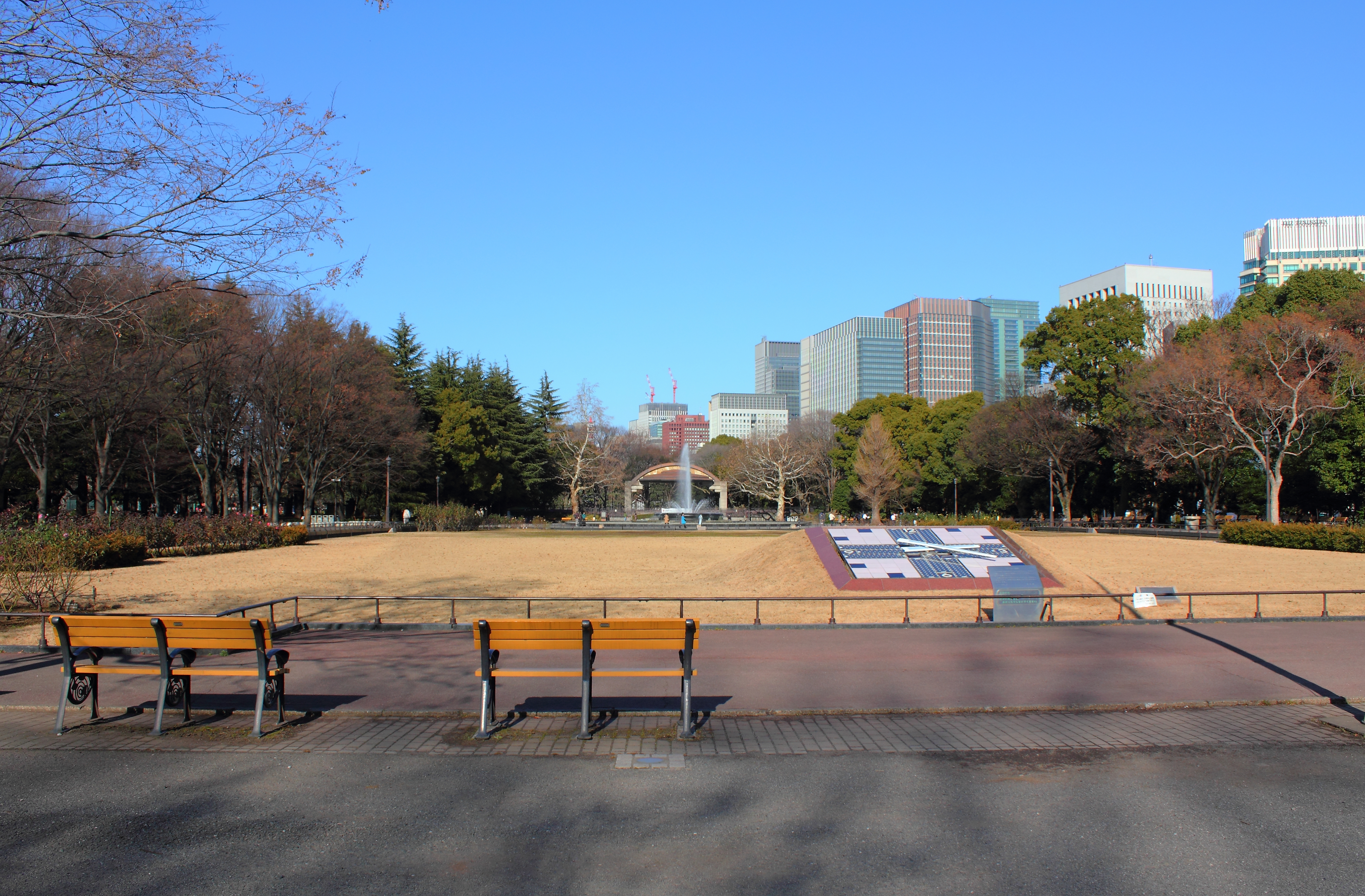
- Hibiya Park
- Location: Chiyoda, Tokyo, Japan

Website
- Hibiya Park official site

Hibiya Park Ground (日比谷公園グラウンド) is an athletic stadium in Hibiya Park, Chiyoda, Tokyo, Japan.

It hosted the 1921 Emperor's Cup and final game between Tokyo Shukyu-Dan and Mikage Shukyu-Dan was played there on November 27, 1921.
