= 1925 Emperor's Cup =

Japanese football tournament

Tournament details
- Country: Japan
- Teams: 6

Final positions
- Champions: Rijo Shukyu-dan (2nd title)
- Runners-up: Tokyo Imperial University
- Semifinalists: Mito High School; Mikage Shukyu-dan

Tournament statistics
- Matches played: 5
- Goals scored: 25 (5 per match)

The 1925 Emperor's Cup was a Japanese association football competition. The fifth Emperor's Cup, it was won by Rijo Shukyu-dan.

== Overview ==
It was contested by 6 teams, and Rijo Shukyu-dan won the cup.

== Results ==
=== Quarterfinals ===
- Mito High School 9–0 Kagoshima Shihan
- Mikage Shukyu-dan 6–1 Nagoya Shukyu-dan

=== Semifinals ===
- Mito High School 0–1 Tokyo Imperial University
- Mikage Shukyu-dan 2–3 Rijo Shukyu-dan

=== Final ===
- Tokyo Imperial University 0–3 Rijo Shukyu-dan

Rijo Shukyu-dan won the cup.
