= 1924 Emperor's Cup =

Japanese football tournament

Tournament details
- Country: Japan
- Teams: 4

Final positions
- Champions: Rijo Club (1st title)
- Runners-up: All Mikage Shihan Club
- Semifinalists: Nagoya Shukyu-dan; Toshima Shukyu-dan

Tournament statistics
- Matches played: 3
- Goals scored: 9 (3 per match)

The 1924 Emperor's Cup was the 4th edition of the Emperor's Cup competition.

== Overview ==
It was contested by 4 teams, Rijo Club won the cup.

== Results ==
=== Semi-finals ===
- Nagoya Shukyu-dan 1–4 All Mikage Shihan Club
- Rijo Club 3–0 Toshima Shukyu-dan

=== Final ===
- All Mikage Shihan Club 0–1 Rijo Club

Rijo Club won the cup.
