= Toshima Shihan Ground =

Athletic stadium in Tokyo, Japan

- 豊島師範グラウンド
- Location: Tokyo, Japan

Toshima Shihan Ground (豊島師範グラウンド) was an athletic stadium in Tokyo, Japan.

It hosted the 1922 Emperor's Cup and final game between Nagoya Shukyu-Dan and Hiroshima Koto-Shihan was played there on November 26, 1922.
