= 1922 Emperor's Cup =

Japanese football tournament

Tournament details
- Country: Japan
- Teams: 4

Final positions
- Champions: Nagoya Shukyu-dan (1st title)
- Runners-up: Hiroshima Koto-shihan
- Semifinalists: Osaka S.C.; Astra Club

Tournament statistics
- Matches played: 3
- Goals scored: 8 (2.67 per match)

The 1922 Emperor's Cup was the second edition of the Emperor's Cup competition.

== Overview ==
It was contested by four teams, and Nagoya Shukyu-dan won the cup. The winning team consisted of graduates of Meirin High School and students of, among others, Aichi Daiichi Teachers College and Shiga Teachers College.

== Results ==
=== Semi-finals ===
- Nagoya Shukyu-dan 2–1 Osaka S.C.
- Hiroshima Koto-shihan 3–1 Astra Club

=== Final ===
- Nagoya Shukyu-dan 1–0 Hiroshima Koto-shihan

Nagoya Shukyu-dan won the cup.
