= 1921 Emperor's Cup =

Japanese football tournament

Tournament details
- Country: Japan
- Teams: 4

Final positions
- Champions: Tokyo Shukyu-dan (1st title)
- Runners-up: Mikage Shukyu-dan
- Semifinalists: Nagoya Shukyu-dan; Yamaguchi High School

Tournament statistics
- Matches played: 2
- Goals scored: 5 (2.5 per match)

The 1921 Emperor's Cup was the first edition of the Emperor's Cup competition.

== Overview ==
It was contested by four teams, and Tokyo Shukyu-dan won the cup. The winning team consisted of graduates from Toshima Teachers College, Aoyama Teachers College and Tokyo Teachers College.

== Results ==
=== Semi-finals ===
- Nagoya Shukyu-dan 0–4 Mikage Shukyu-dan
- Yamaguchi High School (ja) (withdrew) – Tokyo Shukyu-dan (ja)

=== Final ===
November 27, 1921

Tokyo Shukyu-Dan (ja)	1–0	Mikage Shukyu-Dan
? (?)	Report

Hibiya Park Ground

Semi-finals
26 November 1921
Nagoya Soccer Team	0
Mikage Shukyu-dan	4
Yamaguchi High School (withdrew)
Tokyo Shukyu-dan

Final
27 November 1921
Mikage Shukyu-dan	0
Tokyo Shukyu-dan	1
