= List of Japanese sportspeople =

This is a list of Japanese sportspeople not otherwise included in more specific Japanese sportspeople lists.

- Mao Asada – figure skater, Olympic silver medalist, multiple world champion
- Ando Miki – figure skater, multiple world champion
- Antonio Inoki
- Arakawa Shizuka – figure skater, Olympic champion, world champion
- Yuzuru Hanyu – figure skater, double Olympic champion, double world champion, multiple Grand Prix Final champion, Four Continents champion (Super Slam)
- Asai Yoshirō
- Chiyonofuji
- Chuhei Nambu
- Date Kimiko
- Funaki Shōichi
- Sawamatsu Naoko – retired tennis player
- Gomi Takanori
- Hiro Matsushita
- Hiroyuki Tomita – Beijing Olympic gymnast
- Iguchi Tadahito
- Inamoto Junichi
- Itō Midori – figure skater, Olympic silver medalist, world champion
- Kohiruimaki Takayuki
- Konishiki
- Yuki Kyotani (born 1988) – kickboxer
- Maruyama Shigeki
- Masato
- Matsui Hideki
- Shuna Matsumoto, association football coach
- Takuya Miki (三木 拓也; born 1989), wheelchair tennis player
- Miura Kazuyoshi
- Keiichi Tsuchiya – retired racing driver, D1 Grand Prix judge
- Ken Nomura – D1 Grand Prix driver
- Kōhei Uchimura – gymnast, double Olympic champion and multiple world champion
- Mai Murakami – Rio Olympic gymnast, world champion
- Koji Murofushi
- Musashimaru
- Nakata Hidetoshi – football (soccer) player
- Nao Kodaira – speed skater, Olympic champion
- Nobuteru Taniguchi – racing driver
- Tokito Oda (born 2006) - champion wheelchair tennis player
- Ōta Yukina – figure skater
- Sakuraba Kazushi
- Sato Rumina
- Satō Takuma (born 1977) – Formula 1 driver, 2017 Indianapolis 500 winner
- Sato Yuka – figure skater, world champion
- Avi Schafer (born 1998) – professional basketball player
- Kenzō Shirai – Rio Olympic gymnast, multiple world champion
- Sudō Genki
- Sugayama Kaoru
- Sugiyama Ai (born 1975) – Tennis player
- Suguri Fumie – figure skater
- Suzuki Ichirō
- Takeda Kōzō (born 1972) – kickboxer
- Takahashi Daisuke – figure skater, Olympic bronze medalist, world champion
- Taira Uematsu (born 1983) – coach for the San Francisco Giants of Major League Baseball
- Tsunoda Yuki (born 2000) – Formula 1 driver
- Uno Shoma – figure skater, Olympic silver medalist, multiple world medalist
- Yasuyuki Kazama – D1 Grand Prix driver
- Saori Kimura – volleyball player
