= List of professional sports teams in Japan =

This is a list of professional sports teams in Japan, organized by sport. It includes clubs competing in top professional leagues across baseball, basketball, futsal, rugby union, soccer, and volleyball.

== Baseball (2024 Nippon Baseball Professional Season) ==
=== Nippon Professional Baseball ===
- Central League
  - Chunichi Dragons
  - Hanshin Tigers
  - Hiroshima Toyo Carp
  - Tokyo Yakult Swallows
  - Yokohama DeNA BayStars
  - Yomiuri Giants
- Pacific League
  - Chiba Lotte Marines
  - Fukuoka SoftBank Hawks
  - Hokkaido Nippon-Ham Fighters
  - Orix Buffaloes
  - Saitama Seibu Lions
  - Tohoku Rakuten Golden Eagles

== Basketball ==
=== B.League ===
B.League Premier

- Eastern Conference
  - Akita Northern Happinets
  - Altiri Chiba
  - Alvark Tokyo
  - Chiba Jets Funabashi
  - Gunma Crane Thunders
  - Ibaraki Robots
  - Kawasaki Brave Thunders
  - Levanga Hokkaido
  - Sendai 89ers
  - Tokyo Sunrockers
  - Toyama Grouses
  - Utsunomiya Brex
  - Yokohama B-Corsairs
- Western Conference
  - Hiroshima Dragonflies
  - Kobe Storks
  - Kyoto Hannaryz
  - Nagasaki Velca
  - Nagoya Diamond Dolphins
  - Osaka Evessa
  - Ryukyu Golden Kings
  - Saga Ballooners
  - San-en NeoPhoenix
  - Seahorses Mikawa
  - Shiga Lakes
  - Shimane Susanoo Magic
  - Shinshu Brave Warriors

B.League One

- North Conference
  - Aomori Wat's
  - Fukushima Firebonds
  - Iwate Big Bulls
  - Koshigaya Alphas
  - Yamagata Wyverns
- East Conference
  - Earthfriends Tokyo Z
  - Saitama Broncos
  - Tachikawa Dice
  - Tokyo Hachioji Bee Trains
  - Tokyo United BC
- Central Conference
  - Fukui Blowinds
  - Gifu Swoops
  - Kanazawa Samuraiz
  - Niigata Albirex BB
  - Yokohama Excellence
- West Conference
  - Bambitious Nara
  - Fighting Eagles Nagoya
  - Tokushima Gambarous
  - Tryhoop Okayama
  - Veltex Shizuoka
- South Conference
  - Ehime Orange Vikings
  - Kagawa Five Arrows
  - Kagoshima Rebnise
  - Kumamoto Volters
  - Rizing Zephyr Fukuoka

B.League Next

- Shinagawa City BC
- Veertien Mie Basketball
- Wolga Shonan
- Yamaguchi Patsfive

=== Women's Japan Basketball League ===
W.League Premier

- Aisin Wings
- Chanson V-Magic
- Denso Iris
- Eneos Sunflowers
- Fujitsu Red Wave
- Hitachi High-Tech Cougars
- Toyota Boshoku Sunshine Rabbits
- Toyota Antelopes

W.League Future

- Hiroshima Egrets
- Mitsubishi Electric Koalas
- Niigata Albirex BB Rabbits
- Prestige International Aranmare Akita
- SMBC Tokyo Solua
- Tokyo Haneda Vickies
- Yamanashi Queenbees

== Futsal (2023–24 F. League season) ==
=== F. League ===
- F1 League
  - Bardral Urayasu
  - Boaluz Nagano
  - Borkbullet Kitakyushu
  - Espolada Hokkaido
  - Fugador Sumida
  - Nagoya Oceans
  - ASV Pescadola Machida
  - Shonan Bellmare
  - Shriker Osaka
  - Tachikawa Athletic FC
  - Vasagey Oita
  - YSCC Yokohama
- F2 League
  - Agleymina Hamamatsu
  - Hiroshima F Do
  - Ligarevia Katsushika
  - Malva Mito
  - Miracle Smile Niihama
  - Porseid Hamada
  - Shinagawa City FC
  - Vincedor Hakusan
  - Voscuore Sendai

== Rugby (2023–24 Japan Rugby League One season) ==
=== Japan Rugby League One ===
- Japan Rugby League One Division 1
  - Black Rams Tokyo
  - Green Rockets Tokatsu
  - Hanazono Kintetsu Liners
  - Kobelco Kobe Steelers
  - Kubota Spears Funabashi Tokyo Bay
  - Mitsubishi Sagamihara DynaBoars
  - Saitama Wild Knights
  - Shizuoka Blue Revs (formerly known as Yamaha Júbilo)
  - Tokyo Sungoliath
  - Toshiba Brave Lupus Tokyo
  - Toyota Verblitz
  - Yokohama Canon Eagles
- Japan Rugby League One Division 2
  - Hino Red Dolphins
  - Kamaishi Seawaves
  - Mie Honda Heat
  - Shimizu Koto Blue Sharks
  - Shining Arcs Tokyo-Bay Urayasu
  - Toyota Industries Shuttles Aichi
- Japan Rugby League One Division 3
  - Chugoku Red Regulions
  - Kurita Water Gush Akishima
  - Kyuden Voltex (without city/prefecture in the name)
  - NTT DoCoMo Red Hurricanes Osaka
  - Skyactivs Hiroshima

== Soccer ==
=== J.League ===
- J1 League
  - Avispa Fukuoka
  - Cerezo Osaka
  - Fagiano Okayama
  - Gamba Osaka
  - JEF United Chiba
  - Kashima Antlers
  - Kashiwa Reysol
  - Kawasaki Frontale
  - Kyoto Sanga
  - Machida Zelvia
  - Mito HollyHock
  - Nagoya Grampus
  - Sanfrecce Hiroshima
  - Shimizu S-Pulse
  - FC Tokyo
  - Tokyo Verdy
  - Urawa Red Diamonds
  - Vissel Kobe
  - V-Varen Nagasaki
  - Yokohama F. Marinos
- J2 League
  - Albirex Niigata
  - Blaublitz Akita
  - Fujieda MYFC
  - Hokkaido Consadole Sapporo
  - FC Imabari
  - Iwaki FC
  - Júbilo Iwata
  - Kataller Toyama
  - Montedio Yamagata
  - Oita Trinita
  - RB Omiya Ardija
  - Sagan Tosu
  - Shonan Bellmare
  - Tegevajaro Miyazaki
  - Tochigi City FC
  - Tokushima Vortis
  - Vanraure Hachinohe
  - Vegalta Sendai
  - Ventforet Kofu
  - Yokohama FC
- J3 League
  - Ehime FC
  - Fukushima United
  - Gainare Tottori
  - FC Gifu
  - Giravanz Kitakyushu
  - Kagoshima United
  - Kamatamare Sanuki
  - Kochi United
  - Matsumoto Yamaga
  - Nagano Parceiro
  - Nara Club
  - FC Osaka
  - Reilac Shiga
  - Renofa Yamaguchi
  - Roasso Kumamoto
  - FC Ryukyu Okinawa
  - SC Sagamihara
  - Thespa Gunma
  - Tochigi SC
  - Zweigen Kanazawa

=== WE League ===
- Nagano Parceiro
- Albirex Niigata
- Elfen Saitama
- Cerezo Osaka Yanmar
- Kobe Leonessa
- JEF United Chiba
- Mynavi Sendai
- Nojima Stella Kanagawa
- RB Omiya Ardija
- Sanfrecce Hiroshima Regina
- Tokyo Verdy Beleza
- Urawa Red Diamonds

== Volleyball (2023–24 V. League Season) ==
=== V. League ===
- Division 1 (V1)
  - JTEKT Stings
  - JT Thunders Hiroshima
  - VC Nagano Tridents
  - Oita Miyoshi Weisse Adler
  - Panasonic Panthers
  - Osaka Blazers Sakai
  - Suntory Sunbirds
  - Tokyo Great Bears
  - Toray Arrows
  - Wolfdogs Nagoya
- Division 2 (V2)
  - Aisin Tealmare
  - Daido Special Steel Red Star
  - Fujitsu Kawasaki Red Spirits
  - Hyogo Delfino
  - Kinden Trinity Blitz
  - Safilva Hokkaido
  - Saitama Azalea
  - Tsukuba United Sun Gaia
  - Veertien Mie
  - Voreas Hokkaido
- Division 3 (V3)
  - Chiba Zelva
  - Kinki Club Sfida
  - Kubota Spears
  - Nagoya GaRons
  - Nara Dreamers
  - Police Agency Fort Fighters
  - Tokyo Verdy
  - Toyota Mobility Tokyo Sparkle
  - Toyota Motor Sunhawks

== See also ==
- List of football clubs in Japan
- List of women's football clubs in Japan
