= Toshimasa =

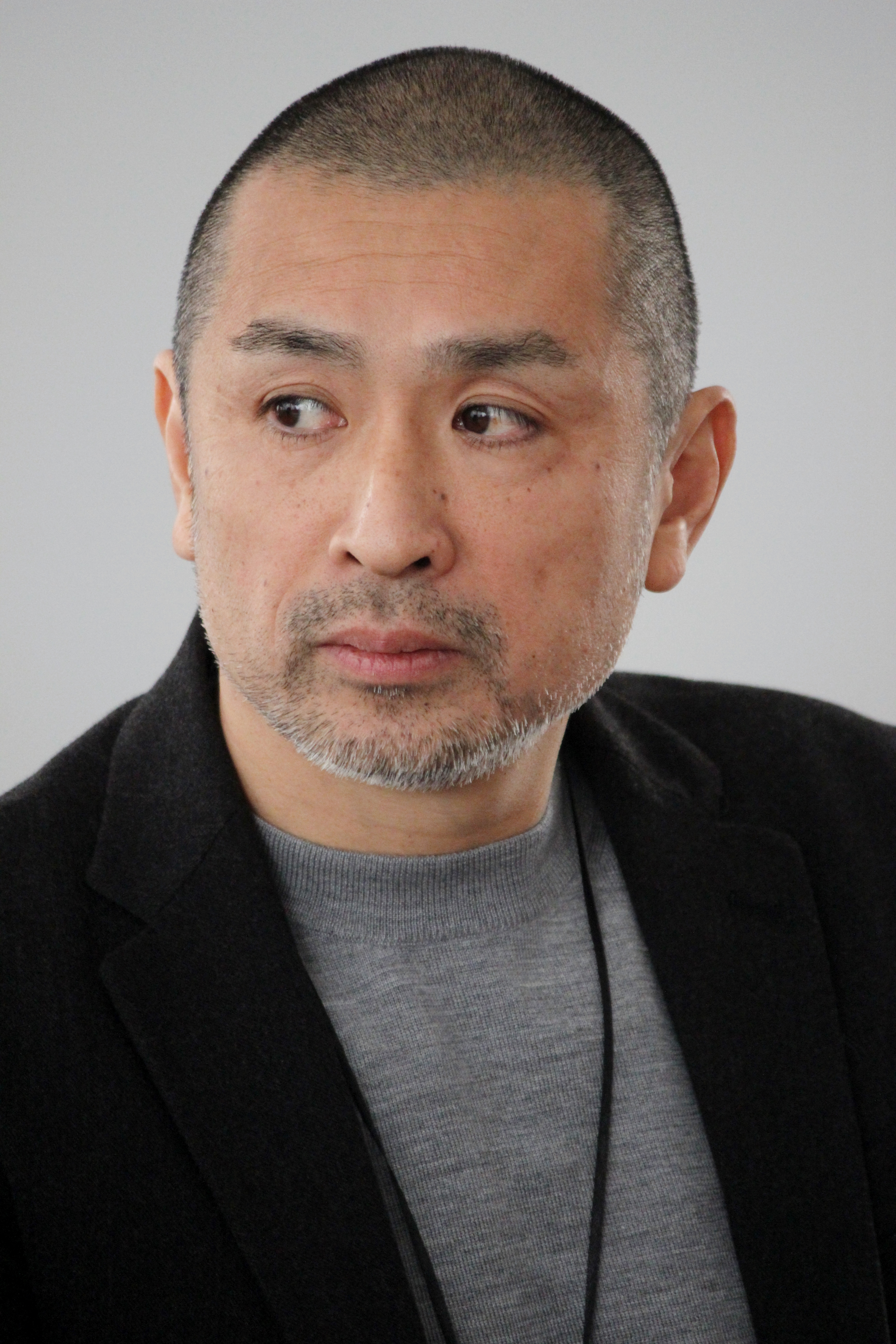
- Toshimasa Ota, Japanese journalist
- Pronunciation: toɕimasa (IPA)
- Gender: Male

Origin
- Origin: Japanese
- Meaning: Different meanings depending on the kanji used

Other names
- Alternative spelling: Tosimasa (Kunrei-shiki) Tosimasa (Nihon-shiki) Toshimasa (Hepburn)

Toshimasa is a masculine Japanese given name.

== Written forms ==
Toshimasa can be written using many different combinations of kanji characters. Some examples:

- 敏正, "agile, righteous"
- 敏雅, "agile, elegant"
- 敏昌, "agile, clear"
- 敏政, "agile, politics"
- 敏将, "agile, commander"
- 敏真, "agile, reality"
- 敏匡, "agile, reform"
- 俊正, "talented, righteous"
- 俊雅, "talented, elegant"
- 俊昌, "talented, clear"
- 俊政, "talented, politics"
- 俊将, "talented, commander"
- 俊真, "talented, reality"
- 俊匡, "talented, reform"
- 利正, "benefit, righteous"
- 利雅, "benefit, elegant"
- 利昌, "benefit, clear"
- 利政, "benefit, politics"
- 利将, "benefit, commander"
- 利真, "benefit, reality"
- 年正, "year, righteous"
- 年昌, "year, clear"
- 寿正, "long life, righteous"
- 寿真, "long life, reality"

The name can also be written in hiragana としまさ or katakana トシマサ.

== Notable people with the name ==
- Toshimasa Furuta (古田 俊正), Japanese astronomer.
- Toshimasa Maeda (前田 利昌, ????–1560), Japanese samurai.
- Toshimasa Nanbu (南部 利正, 1751–1784), Japanese samurai and daimyō.
- Toshimasa Ota (太田 敏正, born 1973), Japanese journalist.
- Toshimasa Shimamura (島村 利正, 1912–1981), Japanese writer.
- Toshimasa Toba (鳥羽 俊正, born 1975), Japanese footballer.
- Toshimasa Zaonishiki (蔵玉錦 敏正, 1952–2020), real name Toshimasa Adachi (安達 敏正), Japanese sumo wrestler.
