= 1923 Emperor's Cup =

Japanese football tournament

Tournament details
- Country: Japan
- Teams: 4

Final positions
- Champions: Astra Club (1st title)
- Runners-up: Nagoya Shukyu-dan
- Semifinalists: Kōbe Kōtō Shōgyō Gakkō; Hiroshima Daiichi Chūgaku

Tournament statistics
- Matches played: 2
- Goals scored: 8 (4 per match)

The 1923 Emperor's Cup was the third edition of the Emperor's Cup competition.

== Overview ==
It was contested by 4 teams, and Astra Club won the cup.

== Results ==
=== Semifinals ===
- Kōbe Kōtō Shōgyō Gakkō 2–3 Nagoya Shukyu-dan
- Hiroshima Daiichi Chūgaku (retired) – Astra Club

=== Final ===
- Nagoya Shukyu-dan 1–2 Astra Club

Astra Club won the championship.
