= Astra Club =

Japanese football club

- Full name: Astra Club
- Founded: 1918
- League: Tokyo League Div.1
- 2025: 5th

Astra Club (アストラ倶楽部, Asutora Kurabu) is a Japanese football (soccer) club whose players are alumni of Gyosei School, in Toshima, Tokyo. It was founded in 1918 and won the Emperor's Cup in 1923. They currently play in the Tokyo Shakaijin Soccer League (level VII).

== Honours ==
- Emperor's Cup

1923
