= Tokyo Shukyu-Dan =

Japanese football club

Tokyo Shukyu-Dan 東京蹴球団
- Full name: Tokyo Shukyu-Dan
- Nickname: Tōshū
- Founded: 1917; 108 years ago
- Chairman: Masao Inoue
- Manager: Tatsuya Ueda
- League: Tokyo Shakaijin League Div. 1
- 2024: 10th of 18
Home colours	Away colours

Tokyo Shukyu-Dan (東京蹴球団, Tōkyō Shūkyū Dan; lit. Tokyo Soccer Club) is a Japanese football club based in Akishima, Tokyo.

It is the oldest Japanese football club, founded in 1917, and it was the first to win the Emperor's Cup, the top national cup in Japan. The captain Goro Yamada later became the manager for the Japan national team.

Very much like Sheffield F.C. in England or Queen's Park F.C. in Scotland, its staunch amateur ideals forced it by the wayside as company clubs, and later fully professionalized clubs, took over the game.

The club now participates in the Tokyo Shakaijin League Division 1, seventh level of the Japanese football league system, since its founding in 1967. It earned second place in 1978 and 1983. Its farm team, Tōshū club also participates in the prefectural league.

== Honours ==
Tokyo Shukyu-Dan honours
Honour	No.	Years
Emperor's Cup	1	1921
Tokyo Shakaijin League	1	2016
