= Emperor's Cup =

- Founded: 1921; 105 years ago
- Region: Japan
- Teams: 88
- Qualifier for: AFC Champions League Elite
- Current champions: Machida Zelvia (1st title)
- Most championships: Keio BRB; Urawa Red Diamonds (8 titles each)
- Broadcaster(s): NHK (live matches and highlights)
- Website: jfa.jp/emperorscup
- 2026–27 Emperor's Cup

This logo was used until 2017. However, it was used for TV broadcasting until 2021.

The Emperor's Cup JFA All-Japan Football Championship Tournament (Japanese: 天皇杯 JFA 全日本サッカー選手権大会, Hepburn: Tennōhai Jēefuē Zen-Nihon Sakkā Senshuken Taikai), commonly known as the Emperor's Cup (Japanese: 天皇杯, サッカー天皇杯, Hepburn: Tennōhai, Sakkā Tennōhai) or Japan FA Cup, and rebranded as The JFA Emperor's Cup from 2024 onwards, is a Japanese annual football competition. It has the longest tradition of any football tournament in Japan, dating back to 1921, before the formation of the J.League, the current JFL (not the former JFL), and their predecessor, the Japan Soccer League.

Before World War II, teams could qualify not only from Japan proper but also from Empire of Japan's colonies such as Korea, Taiwan, and sometimes Manchukuo. The winning club qualifies for the AFC Champions League and the Japanese Super Cup. The tournament's equivalent in women's football is the Empress's Cup.

The current holders are Machida Zelvia, having won their first cup in the 2025 edition.

== Overview ==
As it is a competition to decide the "best soccer club in Japan", the cup is now open to every member club of the Japan Football Association, from J1 and J2 (J.League Divisions 1 and 2) down to teams from J3 (J3 League), JFL, regional leagues, and top college and high school teams from around the country. The Emperor's Cup is one of two well-known national football tournaments named after a monarch (the other is Spain's Copa del Rey).

The holder can wear a Yatagarasu emblem (the ordinary winner wears one, the E letter and the purple line above the bird, the league-cup double winner can wear the gold star and line above the Yatagarasu) and obtains an AFC Champions League spot for the next season.

Since the creation of the J.League in 1992, the professional teams have dominated the competition, although doubles, once common in the JSL, have become very rare. However, because the Emperor's Cup is contested in a knockout tournament format, "giant-killers" from the amateur ranks upsetting a top J.League squad is a very real possibility. For example, a major upset almost occurred in the 2003/04 competition, when Funabashi Municipal High School took the 2003 J.League champion Yokohama F. Marinos to a penalty shootout. Waseda University was the last non-league winner in 1966, and the previous non-top tier winner was in 2011 (contested by two second-tier teams, FC Tokyo and Kyoto Sanga, with FC Tokyo winning 4–2).

Since 1969, the Emperor's Cup final had traditionally been played on New Year's Day of the following year at the National Stadium in Tokyo and is regarded as the traditional closing match of the season. Since 2014, the venue has varied due to the stadium's renovation for the 2020 Summer Olympics. The 2014 Emperor's Cup Final was not held on New Year's Day, but 13 December 2014, due to the Japan's qualification to the 2015 AFC Asian Cup. The 2018 final was held on 9 December 2018. Although an official reason has not been given, it was suspected due to the national team's involvement in 2019 AFC Asian Cup.

On 1 January 2020, first time finalist Vissel Kobe beat Kashima Antlers in the 2019 Emperor's Cup Final at the recently built new National Stadium to win the first title in their 54-year club history. This was the first professional match in Japan video assistant referee (VAR) being used.

=== Format ===
The first matches to qualify for the Emperor's Cup begin anywhere from April to August of that year, and varies year to year. For the 104th Emperor's Cup (2024), the matches were played from 25 May 2024 to 23 November 2024. The knockout phase of the competition begins towards the end of the year. The Emperor's Cup is composed of all teams from J1 League (J1) and J2 (who are granted direct entry to the Cup's second round), the winners from each of the 47 prefectural championships (consist of professional and amateur teams, ranging from J3 League and below), and 1 specially designated team among all amateur teams (this was assigned to the collegiate champion until 2011, and nowadays it's commonly assigned to the JFL champions). The latter 48 starts the competition on the first round. On 2024, an exception for the specially designated team from the JFL had to be made, as Urawa Red Diamonds was banned from participating this year. Two teams were granted this automatic qualification (champions from the JFL and the University Championship), with the lower-ranked between the two assigned to the first round and the higher-ranked assigned to the second round, to replace the aforementioned excluded Urawa Reds.

J1 teams, and sometimes J2 team(s) also receive bye(s) in the knockout phase. In 2016, all J1 teams and the previous year's J2 champions received a bye, and AFC Champions League participants received 3 byes. As of 2024, all J1 and J2 teams receives a bye from the first round, and are automatically assigned to the second round, with the higher ranked teams earning home advantage. However, they lose this home advantage from the third round onwards, unless they are facing a higher-tier or higher ranked team.

From 1965 to 1971, the top 4 JSL clubs at the end of the season qualified for the Cup and the other four spaces allotted were taken by finalists from universities. From 1972 to 1995, as the League increased in size, the entire top division teams were entered automatically, while the second tier's member clubs participated in regional stages with other clubs. Beginning in 1996, the second-tier clubs (at the time, the old Japan Football League) began to be admitted automatically instead of having to play regional stages, which in turn became prefectural stages.

Before 2008, 48 teams took part in the first two rounds – the winner from each of the 47 prefectural championships and the collegiate champion. The top team in the JFL standings and all thirteen J2 teams joined in the third round. Finally, the eighteen J1 teams joined in the fourth round, making a total of 80 participating teams.

=== Trophy ===
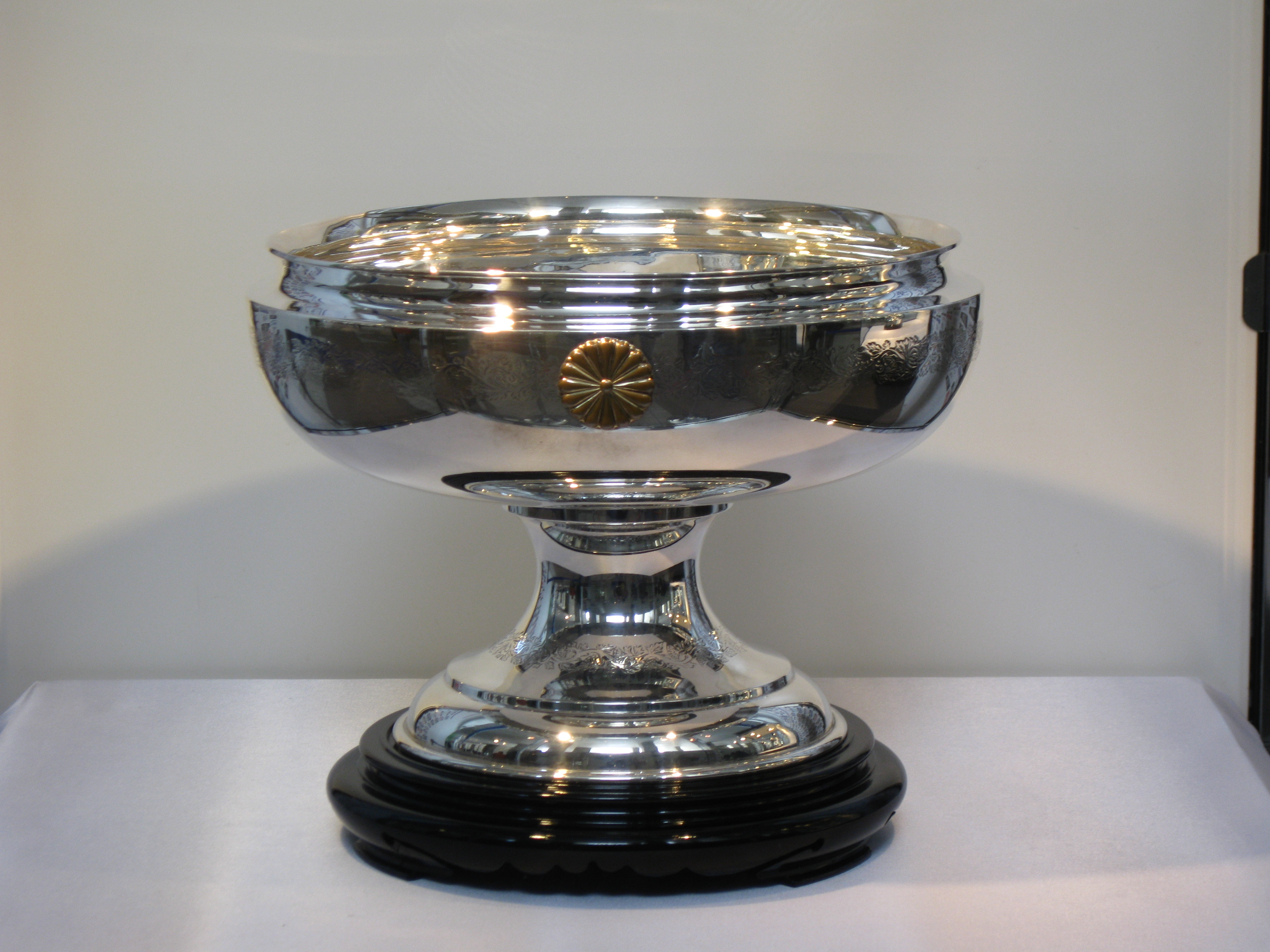
The Emperor's cup award stand

The original All Japan Championship Tournament trophy was awarded to the JFA by the English Football Association in 1919. This trophy was used until January 1945, when the militarist government confiscated it and melted down to procure additional metal for the war effort. When the tournament was reinstated, the present trophy, showing the Imperial chrysanthemum seal began to be awarded.

In August 2011, the English FA presented its Japanese counterpart with a replica of the original trophy, made by London silversmiths Thomas Lyte. JFA President Junji Ogura expressed hope that the trophy, to be awarded at the 2011 final, would be "a symbol of peace".

=== Qualification to AFC Champions League ===
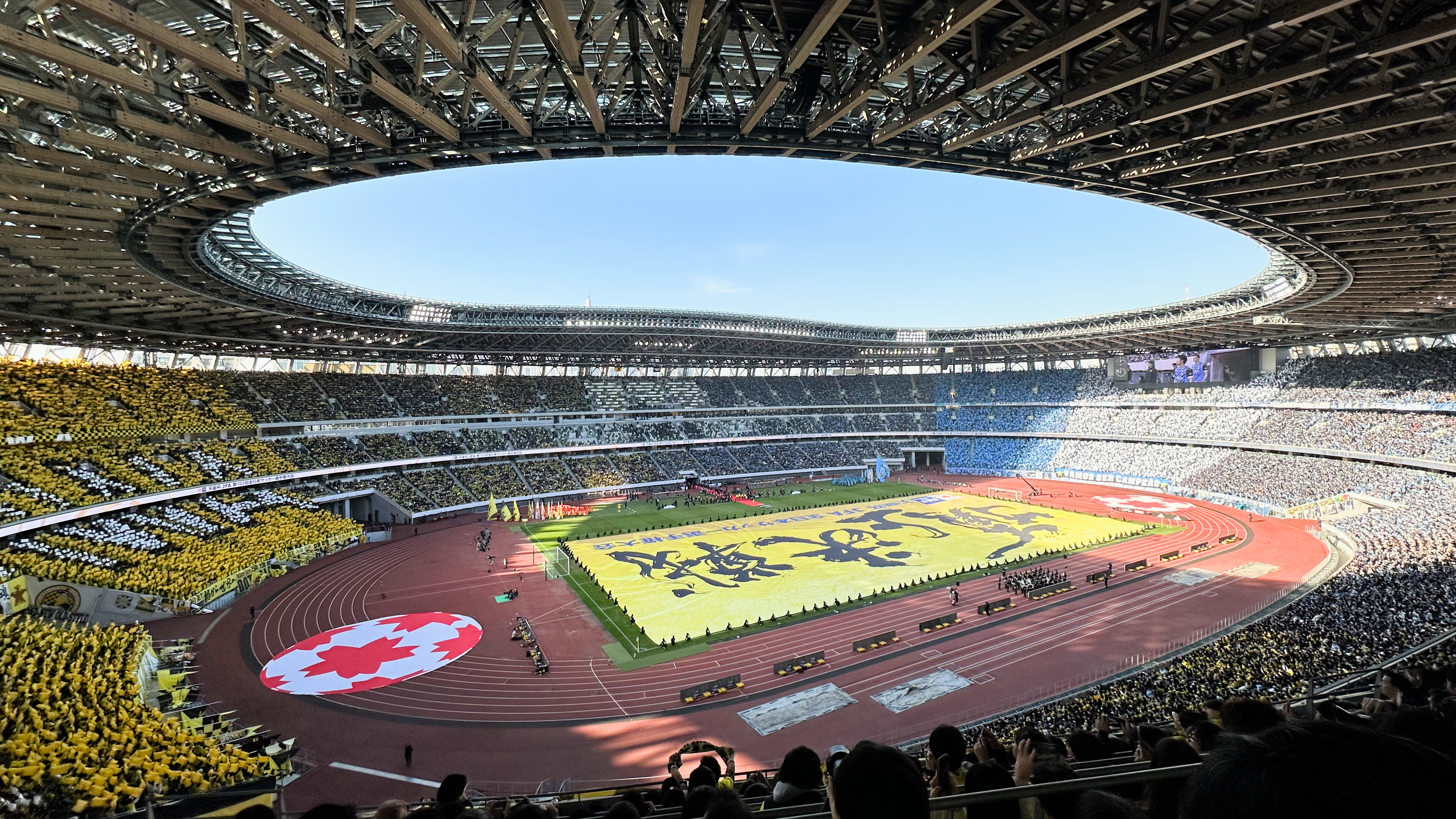
The 2023 Emperor's Cup Final between Kawasaki Frontale and Kashiwa Reysol

The cup winner qualifies for the AFC Champions League (ACL) since the 2001 tournament, where Shimizu S-Pulse qualified for the ACL 2002–03. Before the establishment of ACL, the cup winner qualified for the Asian Cup Winners' Cup. From 2012, as a part of the requirement of AFC, the champion team must also hold a J1 Club License, later the ACL Club License in order to enter the ACL (but not necessary to be a Division 1/J1 team).

From the 2002–03 to 2008 ACL editions, the cup winner participated in the ACL that began one year later; for example, the Emperor's Cup winner for the 2005 season (crowned on 1 January 2006) participated in the 2007 tournament. In November 2007, the JFA announced that the 2009 ACL spot would be given to the 2008 season's winner (crowned on 1 January 2009), not the 2007 winner. As a result, the 2007 winner, Kashima Antlers, did not earn the 2009 ACL spot through the championship. (Nevertheless, Antlers eventually earned the 2009 ACL spot by winning the 2008 J.League Division 1.)

With the reform of AFC Club Competitions starting from the 2024–25 season, the champions will be qualified for the brand-new top tier tournament named AFC Champions League Elite, and they will be seeded into the League stage of that tournament.

If the cup winner has already earned an AFC Champions League spot through finishing above third in J1 League, the last spot will be given to J1's fourth-placed team.

== List of winners ==
List of winners of Emperor's Cup

- 1921: Tokyo Shukyu-dan (1)
- 1922: Nagoya Shukyu-dan (1)
- 1923: Astra Club (1)
- 1924: Rijo Shukyu Football Club (1)
- 1925: Rijo Shukyu Football Club (2)
- 1927: Kobe-Ichi Junior High School Club (1)
- 1928: Waseda University WMW (1)
- 1929: Kwangaku Club (1)
- 1930: Kwangaku Club (2)
- 1931: Imperial Univ. of Tokyo LB (1)
- 1932: Keio Club (1)
- 1933: Tokyo Old Boys Club (1)
- 1935: Kyungsung FC (1)
- 1936: Keio BRB (2)
- 1937: Keio University (1)
- 1938: Waseda University (2)
- 1939: Keio BRB (3)
- 1940: Keio BRB (4)
- 1946: University of Tokyo LB (2)
- 1949: University of Tokyo LB (3)
- 1950: All Kwangaku (3)
- 1951: Keio BRB (5)
- 1952: All Keio (6)
- 1953: All Kwangaku (4)
- 1954: Keio BRB (7)
- 1955: All Kwangaku (5)
- 1956: Keio BRB (8)
- 1957: Chuo University Club (1)
- 1958: Kwangaku Club (6)
- 1959: Kwangaku Club (7)
- 1960: Furukawa Electric (1)
- 1961: Furukawa Electric (2)
- 1962: Chuo University (2)
- 1963: Waseda University (3)
- 1964: Yawata Steel (1)
- 1964: Furukawa Electric (3)
- 1965: Toyo Industries (1)
- 1966: Waseda University (4)
- 1967: Toyo Industries (2)
- 1968: Yanmar Diesel (1)
- 1969: Toyo Industries (3)
- 1970: Yanmar Diesel (2)
- 1971: Mitsubishi Heavy Industries (1)
- 1972: Hitachi (1)
- 1973: Mitsubishi Heavy Industries (2)
- 1974: Yanmar Diesel (3)
- 1975: Hitachi (2)
- 1976: Furukawa Electric (4)
- 1977: Fujita Industries (1)
- 1978: Mitsubishi Heavy Industries (3)
- 1979: Fujita Industries (2)
- 1980: Mitsubishi Heavy Industries (4)
- 1981: Nippon Kokan (1)
- 1982: Yamaha Motor Company (1)
- 1983: Nissan Motor Company (1)
- 1984: Yomiuri FC (1)
- 1985: Nissan Motor Company (2)
- 1986: Yomiuri FC (2)
- 1987: Yomiuri FC (3)
- 1988: Nissan Motor Company (3)
- 1989: Nissan Motor Company (4)
- 1990: Matsushita Electric Industrial (1)
- 1991: Nissan Motor Company (5)
- 1992: Yokohama Marinos (6)
- 1993: Yokohama Flügels (1)
- 1994: Bellmare Hiratsuka (1)
- 1995: Nagoya Grampus Eight (1)
- 1996: Verdy Kawasaki (4)
- 1997: Kashima Antlers (1)
- 1998: Yokohama Flügels (2)
- 1999: Nagoya Grampus Eight (2)
- 2000: Kashima Antlers (2)
- 2001: Shimizu S-Pulse (1)
- 2002: Kyoto Purple Sanga (1)
- 2003: Júbilo Iwata (2)
- 2004: Tokyo Verdy 1969 (5)
- 2005: Urawa Red Diamonds (5)
- 2006: Urawa Red Diamonds (6)
- 2007: Kashima Antlers (3)
- 2008: Gamba Osaka (2)
- 2009: Gamba Osaka (3)
- 2010: Kashima Antlers (4)
- 2011: FC Tokyo (1)
- 2012: Kashiwa Reysol (3)
- 2013: Yokohama F. Marinos (7)
- 2014: Gamba Osaka (4)
- 2015: Gamba Osaka (5)
- 2016: Kashima Antlers (5)
- 2017: Cerezo Osaka (4)
- 2018: Urawa Red Diamonds (7)
- 2019: Vissel Kobe (1)
- 2020: Kawasaki Frontale (1)
- 2021: Urawa Red Diamonds (8)
- 2022: Ventforet Kofu (1)
- 2023: Kawasaki Frontale (2)
- 2024: Vissel Kobe (2)
- 2025: Machida Zelvia (1)

== Performances ==
=== All-time ===
- University club's performance separated as follows: Players are enrolled students / Players are enrolled students and graduates.

| Club | Winners | Runners-up | Winning years | Runners-up years |
|---|---|---|---|---|
| Keio BRB (Enrolled students and graduates) | 8 | 2 | 1932, 1936, 1939, 1940, 1951, 1952, 1954, 1956 | 1930, 1960 |
| Urawa Red Diamonds | 8 | 4 | 1971, 1973, 1978, 1980, 2005, 2006, 2018, 2021 | 1967, 1968, 1979, 2015 |
| Yokohama F. Marinos | 7 | 2 | 1983, 1985, 1988, 1989, 1991, 1992, 2013 | 1990, 2017 |
| Kwansei Gakuin University | 7 | 0 | 1929, 1930, 1950, 1953, 1955, 1958, 1959 | |
| Gamba Osaka | 5 | 4 | 1990, 2008, 2009,2014, 2015 | 2006, 2012, 2020, 2024 |
| Tokyo Verdy | 5 | 3 | 1984, 1986, 1987, 1996, 2004 | 1981, 1991, 1992 |
| Kashima Antlers | 5 | 3 | 1997, 2000, 2007, 2010, 2016 | 1993, 2002, 2019 |
| Cerezo Osaka | 4 | 8 | 1968, 1970, 1974, 2017 | 1971,1972, 1976, 1977, 1983, 1994, 2001, 2003 |
| JEF United Chiba | 4 | 2 | 1960, 1961, 1964, 1976 | 1962, 1984 |
| Sanfrecce Hiroshima | 3 | 12 | 1965, 1967, 1969 | 1954, 1957, 1966, 1970, 1978, 1987, 1995, 1996, 1999, 2007, 2013, 2022 |
| Kashiwa Reysol | 3 | 4 | 1972, 1975, 2012 | 1963, 1973, 2008, 2023 |
| Shonan Bellmare | 3 | 4 | 1977, 1979, 1994 | 1975, 1982, 1985, 1988 |
| Imperial Univ. of Tokyo LB | 3 | 1 | 1931, 1946, 1949 | 1925 |
| Waseda University | 3 | 1 | 1938, 1963, 1966 | 1939 |
| Júbilo Iwata | 2 | 2 | 1982, 2003 | 1989, 2004 |
| Rijo Shukyu Football Club (Hiroshima) | 2 | 1 | 1924, 1925 | 1927 |
| Yokohama Flügels | 2 | 1 | 1993, 1998 | 1997 |
| Nagoya Grampus | 2 | 1 | 1995, 1999 | 2009 |
| Kawasaki Frontale | 2 | 1 | 2020, 2023 | 2016 |
| Vissel Kobe | 2 | 1 | 2019, 2024 | 2025 |
| Shimizu S-Pulse | 1 | 4 | 2001 | 1998, 2000, 2005, 2010 |
| Yawata Steel | 1 | 3 | 1964 | 1956, 1958, 1965 |
| Keio University (Enrolled students) | 1 | 2 | 1937 | 1938, 1950 |
| Chuo University | 1 | 2 | 1962 | 1959, 1961 |
| Waseda University WMW | 1 | 1 | 1928 | 1940 |
| Chuo University Club | 1 | 1 | 1957 | 1955 |
| Nagoya Shukyu-dan | 1 | 1 | 1922 | 1923 |
| Nippon Kokan | 1 | 1 | 1981 | 1986 |
| Kyoto Sanga | 1 | 1 | 2002 | 2011 |
| Tokyo Shukyu-dan | 1 | 0 | 1921 | |
| Astra Club (Tokyo) | 1 | 0 | 1923 | |
| Kobe-Ichi Junior High School Club | 1 | 0 | 1927 | |
| Tokyo Old Boys Club | 1 | 0 | 1933 | |
| Kyungsung FC | 1 | 0 | 1935 | |
| FC Tokyo | 1 | 0 | 2011 | |
| Ventforet Kofu | 1 | 0 | 2022 | |
| Machida Zelvia | 1 | 0 | 2025 | |
| Osaka Club | 0 | 3 | | 1951, 1952, 1953 |
| Kobe University of Commerce | 0 | 2 | | 1937, 1946 |
| Mikage Shukyu-dan (Kobe) | 0 | 1 | | 1921 |
| Hiroshima Koto-shihan | 0 | 1 | | 1922 |
| All Mikage Shihan Club (Kobe) | 0 | 1 | | 1924 |
| Imperial University of Kyoto | 0 | 1 | | 1928 |
| Hosei University | 0 | 1 | | 1929 |
| Kobun Junior High School (Taiwan) | 0 | 1 | | 1931 |
| Yoshino Club (Nagoya) | 0 | 1 | | 1932 |
| Sendai Soccer Club | 0 | 1 | | 1933 |
| Tokyo Bunri University | 0 | 1 | | 1935 |
| Bosung College (Seoul) | 0 | 1 | | 1936 |
| Kandai Club | 0 | 1 | | 1949 |
| Rikkyo University | 0 | 1 | | 1969 |
| Eidai Industries | 0 | 1 | | 1974 |
| Tanabe Pharmaceutical | 0 | 1 | | 1980 |
| Montedio Yamagata | 0 | 1 | | 2014 |
| Vegalta Sendai | 0 | 1 | | 2018 |
| Oita Trinita | 0 | 1 | | 2021 |

=== J.League era (1992–present) ===
| Club | Winners | Runners-up | Winning seasons | Runners-up seasons |
|---|---|---|---|---|
| Kashima Antlers | 5 | 3 | 1997, 2000, 2007, 2010, 2016 | 1993, 2002, 2019 |
| Gamba Osaka | 4 | 4 | 2008, 2009, 2014, 2015 | 2006, 2012, 2020, 2024 |
| Urawa Red Diamonds | 4 | 1 | 2005, 2006, 2018, 2021 | 2015 |
| Yokohama F. Marinos | 2 | 1 | 1992, 2013 | 2017 |
| Yokohama Flügels | 2 | 1 | 1993, 1998 | 1997 |
| Nagoya Grampus | 2 | 1 | 1995, 1999 | 2009 |
| Tokyo Verdy | 2 | 1 | 1996, 2004 | 1992 |
| Kawasaki Frontale | 2 | 1 | 2020, 2023 | 2016 |
| Vissel Kobe | 2 | 1 | 2019, 2024 | 2025 |
| Shimizu S-Pulse | 1 | 4 | 2001 | 1998, 2000, 2005, 2010 |
| Cerezo Osaka | 1 | 3 | 2017 | 1994, 2001, 2003 |
| Kashiwa Reysol | 1 | 2 | 2012 | 2008, 2023 |
| Kyoto Sanga | 1 | 1 | 2002 | 2011 |
| Júbilo Iwata | 1 | 1 | 2003 | 2004 |
| Shonan Bellmare | 1 | 0 | 1994 | |
| FC Tokyo | 1 | 0 | 2011 | |
| Ventforet Kofu | 1 | 0 | 2022 | |
| Machida Zelvia | 1 | 0 | 2025 | |
| Sanfrecce Hiroshima | 0 | 6 | | 1995, 1996, 1999, 2007, 2013, 2022 |
| Montedio Yamagata | 0 | 1 | | 2014 |
| Vegalta Sendai | 0 | 1 | | 2018 |
| Oita Trinita | 0 | 1 | | 2021 |

== Other Emperor's Cups ==
The Emperor's Cup term is used for many national championships in other sports, including judo (the All-Japan Judo Championships) and volleyball (Emperor's Cup and Empress's Cup All Japan Volleyball Championship). The Emperor's Cup (天皇賜杯, Tennō shihai) is awarded to the top division yūshō winner of a sumo tournament.

== See also ==
- Football in Japan
- Japan Football Association (JFA)
- Japanese association football league system
- League system
- J.League
  - J1 League
  - J2 League
  - J3 League
- Japan Football League (JFL) (IV)
- Japan Regional Football Champions League (Promotion Play-offs to JFL)
- Japanese Regional Leagues (V/VI)
- Fujifilm Super Cup (Super Cup)
- J.League YBC Levain Cup (League Cup)
- Empress's Cup
