= Football in Japan =

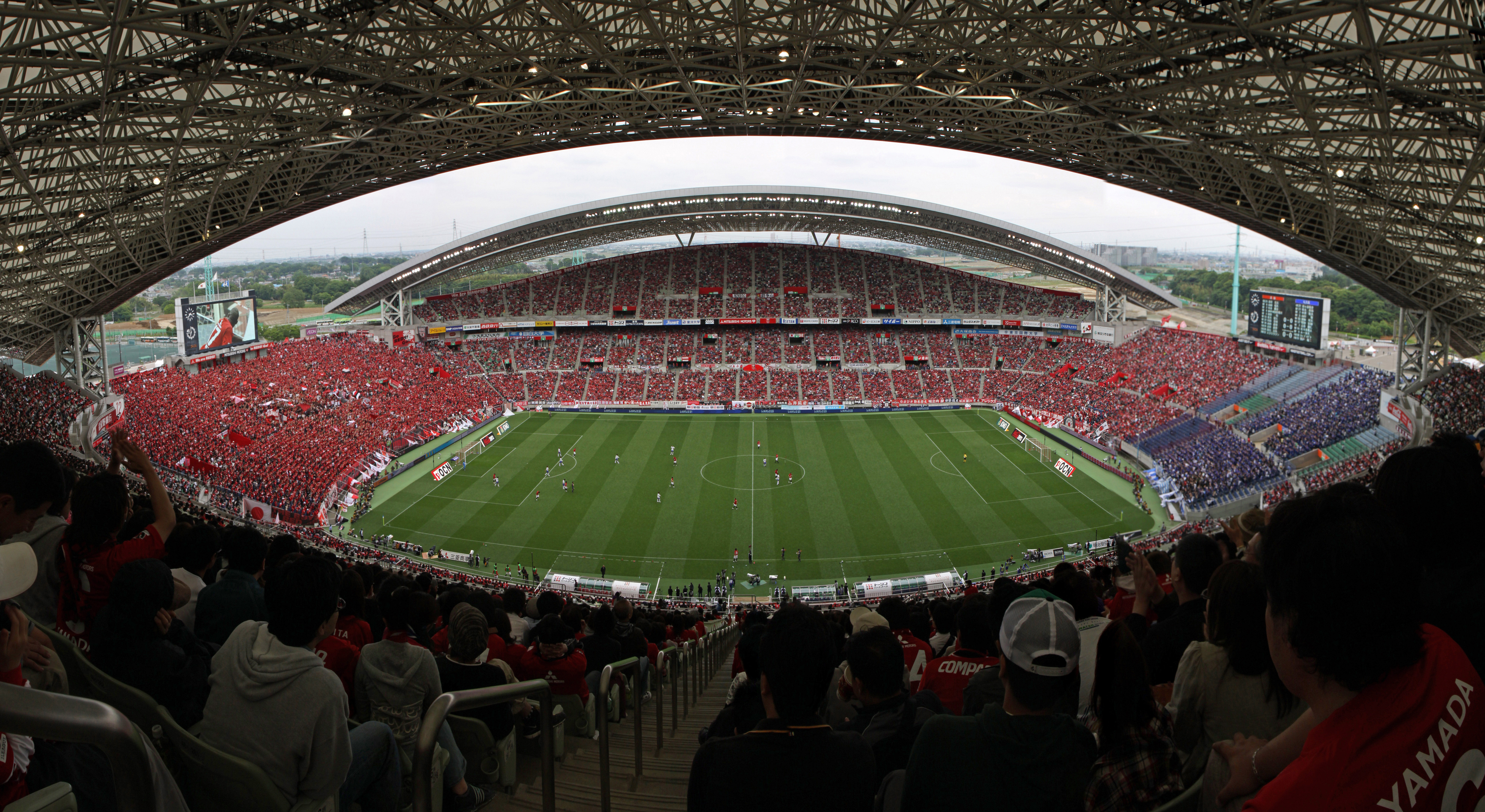
- Japanese football fans in Saitama.
- Country: Japan
- Governing body: JFA
- National teams: Men's team Women's team

National competitions
- FIFA World Cup; AFC Asian Cup

Club competitions
- League: J1 League J2 League J3 League Japan Football League Regional Leagues Prefectural Leagues Cup(s): Fujifilm Super Cup (Super Cup) Emperor's Cup JFA Japan Football Championship (National Cup) J.League YBC Levain Cup (League Cup)

International competitions
- FIFA Club World Cup; FIFA Intercontinental Cup; AFC Champions League Elite; AFC Champions League Two

Football (soccer) is among the most popular sports in Japan, together with baseball, tennis, golf, sumo, and combat sports. Around 40% of Japanese people consider themselves football fans. The nationwide organization of football, the Japan Football Association, administers the professional football leagues, including J.League, which is considered by many the most successful football league in Asia. Japan is also the country with the most comprehensively developed football in Asia in both men and women as well as in both futsal and beach soccer.

== Football ==
Although the official English name of the Japan Football Association uses the term "football", the term sakkā (サッカー), derived from "soccer", is much more commonly used than futtobōru (フットボール). The JFA's Japanese name is Nippon Sakkā Kyōkai.

From 1885 to around 1908 in the Meiji era, fūtobōru (フートボール) was the most commonly used term, and assoshieshon (アッソシエーション) also appeared; these were often written together with kemari (蹴鞠), a ball game of the Heian period. During the Taishō era and the early Shōwa era, terms such as ashiki futtobōru (ア式フットボール), ashiki shūkyū (ア式蹴球), and shūkyū (蹴球) came into frequent use. With previously exclusive Japanese terms replaced by American influence after the war, sakkā became more commonplace. In recent years, many professional teams have named themselves F.C.s (football clubs), with examples being FC Tokyo and Kyoto Sanga FC.

== History ==
The introduction of football in Japan is officially credited by the Japan Football Association, and numerous academic papers and books on the history of association football in Japan, to then Lieutenant-Commander Archibald Lucius Douglas of the Royal Navy and his subordinates, who from 1873 taught the game and its rules to Japanese navy cadets while acting as instructors at the Imperial Japanese Navy Academy in Tsukiji, Tokyo.

The first official football match in Japan is widely believed to have been held on February 18, 1888, between the Yokohama Country & Athletic Club and Kobe Regatta & Athletic Club. YC&AC is the oldest running association football club in Japan as Association Football was introduced into the club on December 25, 1886, for training sessions starting from January 1887. The first Japanese association football club, founded as a football club, is considered to be Tokyo Shukyu-dan, founded in 1917, which is now competing in the Tokyo Prefectural amateur league.

In the 1920s, football associations were organised and regional tournaments began in universities and high schools especially in Tokyo. In 1930, the Japan national association football team was organised and had a 3–3 tie with China for their first title at the Far Eastern Championship Games. The Japan national team also participated in the 1936 Berlin Olympic Games, the team had the first victory in an Olympic game with a 3–2 win over powerful Sweden.

Aside from the national cup, the Emperor's Cup established in 1921, there had been several attempts at creating a senior-level national championship. The first was the All Japan Works Football Championship (AJWFC), established in 1948 and open only to company teams. The second was the All Japan Inter-City Football Championship (AJICFC), established in 1955 and separating clubs by cities (any club, works, university or autonomous, could represent their home city and qualify) but the Emperor's Cup remained dominated by universities until the late 1950s. All these tournaments were cups following single-elimination formulas, similar to Serie A in Italy before 1929.

The first organized national league, the Japan Soccer League, was organized in 1965 with eight amateur company clubs and replaced the AJWFC and AJICFC. At the 1968 Mexico Olympic Games, the Japan national team, filled with the top JSL stars of the era, had its first big success winning third place and a bronze medal. Olympic success spurred the creation of a Second Division for the JSL and openings for the first few professional players, in the beginning, foreigners (mainly Brazilians), and a few from other countries, which also led to the country hosting its first international competition, the 1979 FIFA World Youth Championship. Japanese players, however, remained an amateur, having to work day jobs for the companies owning the clubs (or other companies if their clubs were autonomous). This limited the growth of the Japanese game, and many better Japanese players had to move abroad to make a living off the game, such as Yasuhiko Okudera, the first Japanese player to play in a professional European club, (1. FC Köln of Germany). UEFA and CONMEBOL aided the Japanese awareness of football by having the Intercontinental Cup played in Tokyo as a neutral venue.

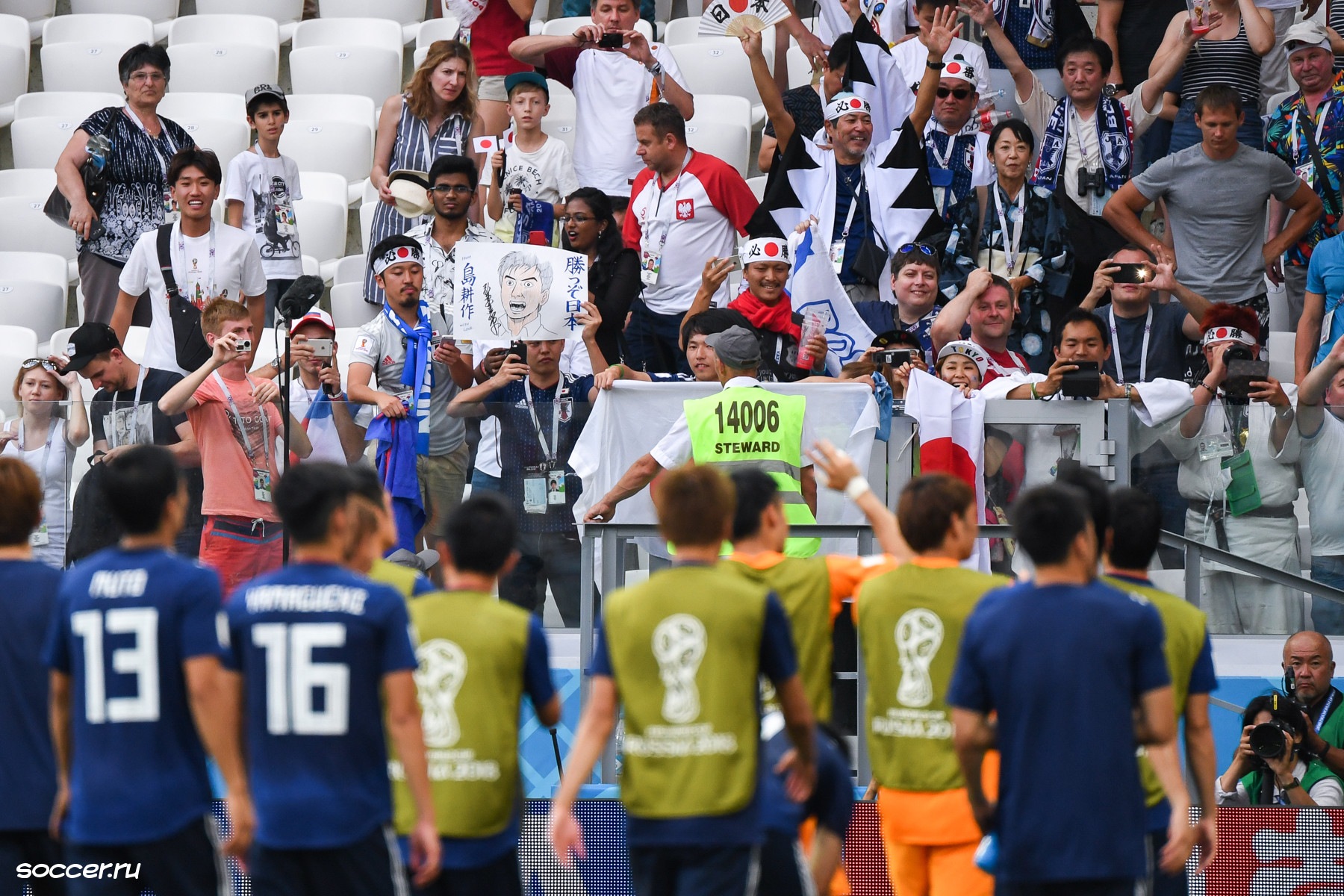
Japan national team at the 2018 FIFA World Cup in Russia

In 1993, the Japan Professional Football League (commonly known as the J.League) was formed replacing the semi-professional Japan Soccer League as the new top-level club competition in Japan. It consisted of some of the top clubs from the old JSL, fully professionalized, renamed to fit communities and with the corporate identity reduced to a minimum. The new higher-standard league attracted many more spectators and helped the sport to hugely increase in popularity. The professionalized league also offered, and offers, incentives for amateur non-company clubs to become part of their ranks with no major backing from a company; major examples of community, non-company-affiliated clubs who rose through the prefectural and regional ranks into the major leagues are Albirex Niigata and Oita Trinita.

Japan participated in its first-ever World Cup tournament at the 1998 FIFA World Cup held in France. In 2002, Japan co-hosted the 2002 FIFA World Cup with Republic of Korea. After this, the association football communities of both countries received the FIFA Fair Play Award. The Japanese national team has reached the round of 16 on four occasions – as hosts in 2002, where they were knocked out by Turkey 1–0, in 2010, where they lost to Paraguay in penalties, in 2018 where they fell 2–3 to Belgium, and in the 2022 FIFA World Cup, where they lost at penalties against Croatia. Japan also qualified for the 2006 FIFA World Cup in Germany, the 2010 FIFA World Cup in South Africa, the 2014 FIFA World Cup in Brazil and the 2026 FIFA World Cup in Canada, Mexico, and the United States.

== Football in fiction ==
The first worldwide popular association football-oriented Japanese animation (manga) series, Captain Tsubasa, was started in 1981. Captain Tsubasa was extremely popular among children of both genders in Japan. Its success led to much more association football manga being written, and it played a great role in association football history in Japan. Playing football became more popular than playing baseball in many schools throughout Japan from the 1980s due to the series.

Captain Tsubasa has also inspired the likes of prominent footballers such as Hidetoshi Nakata, Seigo Narazaki, Zinedine Zidane, Francesco Totti, Fernando Torres, Christian Vieri, Giuseppe Sculli, James Rodríguez, Alexis Sánchez and Alessandro Del Piero to play association football and choose it as a career. The inspiration for the character of Tsubasa Oozora came from a number of players, including most prominently Musashi Mizushima, arguably the first Japanese footballer to play abroad, and whose move to São Paulo FC as a ten-year-old boy was partly mimicked in the manga.

The anime Giant Killing revolves around a team's efforts to go from one of the worst professional teams in Japan to the best. Other works focusing on football include Hungry Heart: Wild Striker (from the same author of Captain Tsubasa), The Knight in the Area, Days, Inazuma Eleven, Aoashi, Be Blues! and Blue Lock.

== Women's football ==
As in European countries, Japanese women's football is organized on a promotion and relegation basis. The top flight of women's association football is the semi-professional L. League (currently billed as the Nadeshiko League). Most clubs are independent clubs, although the recent trend is to have women's sections of established J.League clubs.

The national team has enjoyed major success at the FIFA Women's World Cup, having achieved its greatest triumph ever by winning the 2011 FIFA Women's World Cup in Germany and finishing as runner-up in 2015 in Canada.

== Small-sided football ==
- Japan national futsal team
- F.League (Futsal league)
- FIFA Futsal World Cup
- AFC Futsal Asian Cup
- AFC Futsal Club Championship
- WMF World Cup

== Championships and tournaments ==
=== Domestic tournaments ===
- J.League (Japan Professional Football League) is the top national league in Japan with a J1, J2 and J3 League.
- Japan Football League (JFL) is the national amateur league.
- Emperor's Cup (since 1921) the national open cup.
- J.League Cup is the cup restricted to J.League members (usually J1 alone).
- All Japan Adults Football Tournament, cup for clubs in regional leagues below JFL.
- Japanese Regional Football Champions League, round-robin elimination tournament for the promotion of regional-league clubs into JFL.

=== Other international tournaments held in Japan ===
- 1958 3rd Asian Games, Tokyo
- 1964 Tokyo Olympic Games
- 1979 FIFA World Youth Championship
- 1992 AFC Asian Cup, Hiroshima
- 1993 FIFA U-17 World Championship
- 1994 12th Asian Games, Hiroshima
- 1998 Dynasty Cup, Tokyo & Yokohama Dynasty Cup
- 2001 FIFA Confederations Cup (joint with South Korea)
- 2002 FIFA World Cup (joint with South Korea)
- Intercontinental Cup / Toyota European/South American Cup (1981–2004)
- 2005–2008, 2011–2012, 2015–2016 FIFA Club World Cup
- 2020 Tokyo Olympic Games

== Japanese footballers ==
- Kunishige Kamamoto (1944–2025), Top scorer in 1968 Summer Olympics.
- Yasuhiko Okudera (1952– ), first Japanese player in the European League (Bundesliga).
- Kazuyoshi Miura (1967– ), Asian Footballer of the Year in 1993 and also currently the oldest person still playing professional football, at the age of 59.
- Masami Ihara (1967– ), Asian Footballer of the Year in 1995
- Masashi Nakayama (1967– ), first Japanese player to score a goal in a FIFA World Cup
- Hidetoshi Nakata (1977– ), Asian Footballer of the Year in 1997 and 1998
- Shunsuke Nakamura (1978–), Scottish Professional Footballers' Association Player of the Year in 2007
- Homare Sawa (1978–), FIFA Women's World Player of the Year in 2011 and one of only two players of either sex to participate in six World Cup final tournaments
- Shinji Ono (1979– ), Asian Footballer of the Year in 2002
- Yasuhito Endō (1980– ), Most capped (152) player

== Men's national team achievements ==
- 1968 Mexico Olympic Games – Bronze Medal
- 1992 2nd Dynasty Cup 1992 – Champions
- 1992 10th Asian Cup – Champions
- 1993 5th Afro-Asian Nations Cup – Champions
- 1995 3rd Dynasty Cup – Champions
- 1998 4th Dynasty Cup – Champions
- 1999 FIFA World Youth Championship – Silver Medal
- 2000 12th Asian Cup – Champions
- 2001 FIFA Confederations Cup – Silver Medal
- 2002 FIFA World Cup – Round of 16
- 2004 13th Asian Cup – Champions
- 2006 FIFA World Cup – Group Stage
- 2007 14th Asian Cup – Semi-final
- 2010 FIFA World Cup – Round of 16
- 2011 15th Asian Cup – Champions
- 2014 FIFA World Cup – Group Stage
- 2015 16th Asian Cup – Quarter Final
- 2018 FIFA World Cup – Round of 16
- 2019 17th Asian Cup – Runners-up
- 2022 FIFA World Cup – Round of 16
- 2023 AFC Asian Cup – Quarter-finals
- 2026 FIFA World Cup – Round of 32

== Women's national team achievements ==
- 1986 AFC Women's Championship – Runners-up
- 1989 AFC Women's Championship – Third place
- 1990 Asian Games – Silver Medal
- 1991 AFC Women's Championship – Runners-up
- 1993 AFC Women's Championship – Third place
- 1994 Asian Games – Silver Medal
- 1995 FIFA Women's World Cup – Quarter-finals
- 1995 AFC Women's Championship – Runners-up
- 1997 AFC Women's Championship – Third place
- 1998 Asian Games – Bronze Medal
- 2001 AFC Women's Championship – Runners-up
- 2002 Asian Games – Bronze Medal
- 2006 Asian Games – Silver Medal
- 2008 AFC Women's Asian Cup – Third place
- 2010 AFC Women's Asian Cup – Third place
- 2010 Asian Games – Gold Medal
- 2011 FIFA Women's World Cup – Champions
- 2012 London Olympic Games – Silver Medal
- 2014 AFC Women's Asian Cup – Champions
- 2015 FIFA Women's World Cup – Runners-up
- 2018 AFC Women's Asian Cup – Champions
- 2019 FIFA Women's World Cup – Round 16
- 2020 Tokyo Olympic Games – Quarter Final
- 2022 AFC Women's Asian Cup – Semi-final
- 2023 FIFA Women's World Cup – Quarter-finals
- 2026 AFC Women's Asian Cup – Champions

== Seasons in Japanese association football ==
1920s:		1921	1922	1923	1924	1925	1926	1927	1928	1929
1930s:	1930	1931	1932	1933	1934	1935	1936	1937	1938	1939
1940s:	1940	1941	1942	1943	1944	1945	1946	1947	1948	1949
1950s:	1950	1951	1952	1953	1954	1955	1956	1957	1958	1959
1960s:	1960	1961	1962	1963	1964	1965	1966	1967	1968	1969
1970s:	1970	1971	1972	1973	1974	1975	1976	1977	1978	1979
1980s:	1980	1981	1982	1983	1984	1985	1986	1987	1988	1989
1990s:	1990	1991	1992	1993	1994	1995	1996	1997	1998	1999
2000s:	2000	2001	2002	2003	2004	2005	2006	2007	2008	2009
2010s:	2010	2011	2012	2013	2014	2015	2016	2017	2018	2019
2020s:	2020	2021	2022	2023	2024	2025	2026	2027	2028	2029

== Football stadiums in Japan ==
Stadiums with a capacity of 50,000 or higher are included.

#	Image	Stadium	Capacity	City	Region	Built	Home team(s)
1		Japan National Stadium	80,016	Tokyo	Kantō region	2019	Japan national football team (some matches); Japan national rugby union team
2		Nissan Stadium	72,327	Yokohama	Kanagawa	1998	Yokohama F. Marinos
3		Saitama Stadium 2002	63,700	Saitama	Kantō region	2001	Japan national football team (most matches); Urawa Red Diamonds
4		Shizuoka Stadium	50,889	Fukuroi	Shizuoka	2001	some Júbilo Iwata and Shimizu S-Pulse matches

== Support ==
=== Polling ===
Most supported J1 League clubs (Statista, 2024)
Club	%
Urawa Red Diamonds	4.3%
Sanfrecce Hiroshima	2.9%
Nagoya Grampus	2.9%
Gamba Osaka	2.8%
Hokkaido Consadole Sapporo	2.6%
Yokohama F. Marinos	2.6%
Kashima Antlers	2.5%
Cerezo Osaka	2.4%
Avispa Fukuoka	2.3%
Vissel Kobe	2.3%
Kawasaki Frontale	2.1%
Júbilo Iwata	1.9%
Tokyo Verdy	1.5%
FC Tokyo	1.5%
Kyoto Sanga	1.0%
Kashiwa Reysol	0.9%
Albirex Niigata	0.9%
Sagan Tosu	0.8%
Machida Zelvia	0.8%
Shonan Bellmare	0.5%

== See also ==
- Sport in Japan
  - Football in Japan
    - Women's football in Japan
- Japan Football Association (JFA)
  - Football competitions in Japan
    - League
      - J.League
        - J1 League (I)
        - J2 League (II)
        - J3 League (III)
      - Japan Football League (IV)
      - Japanese Regional Leagues (V / VI)
    - Cup
      - Fujifilm Super Cup
      - Emperor's Cup (National Open Cup)
      - J.League YBC Levain Cup (League Cup)

== Attendances ==
=== 2026 ===
The average home attendance figures of the 2026 J1 League:

#	Football club	Matches	Total attendance	Av. attendance
1	Urawa Red Diamonds	9	320,032	35,559
2	FC Tokyo	9	287,688	31,965
3	Nagoya Grampus	9	279,170	31,019
4	Gamba Osaka	9	256,789	28,532
5	Kashima Antlers	9	249,922	27,769
6	Sanfrecce Hiroshima	9	237,512	26,390
7	Yokohama F. Marinos	9	235,593	26,177
8	Kawasaki Frontale	9	226,905	25,212
9	Tokyo Verdy	9	211,263	23,474
10	Cerezo Osaka	9	184,766	20,530
11	V-Varen Nagasaki	9	178,580	19,842
12	Vissel Kobe	9	162,019	18,002
13	FC Machida Zelvia	9	155,278	17,253
14	Kyoto Sanga FC	9	146,579	16,287
15	Shimizu S-Pulse	9	143,384	15,932
16	JEF United Chiba	9	131,389	14,599
17	Fagiano Okayama	9	126,511	14,057
18	Kashiwa Reysol	9	118,443	13,160
19	Avispa Fukuoka	9	81,033	9,004
20	Mito HollyHock	9	75,301	8,367

=== Historical attendances ===
The average attendance per top-flight football league season and the club with the highest average attendance:

Season	League average	Best club	Best club average
2026	18,745	Urawa Red Diamonds	35,559
2025	21,246	Urawa Red Diamonds	37,350
2024	20,355	Urawa Red Diamonds	37,519
2023	18,991	Urawa Red Diamonds	30,509
2022	14,329	Urawa Red Diamonds	23,617
2019	20,751	Urawa Red Diamonds	34,184
2018	19,064	Urawa Red Diamonds	35,502
2017	18,878	Urawa Red Diamonds	33,542
2014	17,297	Urawa Red Diamonds	35,516
2013	17,226	Urawa Red Diamonds	37,100
2012	17,567	Urawa Red Diamonds	36,634
2011	15,799	Urawa Red Diamonds	33,910
2010	18,515	Urawa Red Diamonds	39,941
2009	19,121	Urawa Red Diamonds	44,210
2008	19,208	Urawa Red Diamonds	47,609
2007	19,066	Urawa Red Diamonds	46,667
2006	18,301	Urawa Red Diamonds	45,732
2005	18,763	Albirex Niigata	40,114
1996	13,353	Urawa Red Diamonds	24,329

Sources: League pages on Wikipedia

Awards
Preceded by Paolo Di Canio	FIFA Fair Play Award Winner; 2002	Succeeded by Fans of Celtic F.C.
