= 1961 in Japanese football =

1961 season

This article provides an overview of Japanese football in the year 1961. In 1961, the Japan national football team went 2-5 in international play.

== Emperor's Cup ==
May 7, 1961

Furukawa Electric	3–2	Chuo University
? (?) ? (?) ? (?)		? (?) ? (?)

Fujieda Higashi High School Ground

== National team ==
=== Results ===
1961.05.28	Japan	3–2	Malaya	Tokyo, Japan
	Kawabuchi 4'; Shiji 68'; Kuwata 79'	JFA	? (?) ? (?)	Stadium: Tokyo National Stadium; Attendance: 5,000

1961.06.11	Japan	0–2	South Korea	Tokyo, Japan
		JFA	? (?) ? (?)	Stadium: Tokyo National Stadium; Attendance: 30,000

1961.08.02	Japan	2–3	Malaya	Kuala Lumpur, Malaya
	Yaegashi 2'; T. Miyamoto 32'	JFA	? (?) ? (?) ? (?)	Attendance: 20,000

1961.08.06	Japan	3–1	India	Kuala Lumpur, Malaya
	T. Miyamoto 56', 71'; Watanabe 65'	JFA	? (?)

1961.08.10	Japan	2–3	South Vietnam	Kuala Lumpur, Malaya
	Kamata 19'; Yaegashi 62'	JFA	? (?) ? (?) ? (?)

1961.08.15	Japan	0–2	Indonesia	Singapore
		JFA	? (?) ? (?)

1961.11.28	Japan	0–1	Yugoslavia	Tokyo, Japan
		JFA	? (?)	Stadium: Tokyo National Stadium

=== Players statistics ===
Player	-1960	05.28	06.11	08.02	08.06	08.10	08.15	11.28	1961	Total
Ryuzo Hiraki	25(1)	O	O	-	-	-	-	-	2(0)	27(1)
Yasuo Takamori	23(0)	-	-	-	-	-	O	O	2(0)	25(0)
Michihiro Ozawa	17(0)	O	O	O	O	O	-	O	6(0)	23(0)
Yoshio Furukawa	16(0)	-	-	-	-	-	O	-	1(0)	17(0)
Masao Uchino	13(3)	-	O	-	-	-	-	O	2(0)	15(3)
Saburo Kawabuchi	12(5)	O(1)	-	O	O	O	O	O	6(1)	18(6)
Mitsuo Kamata	12(0)	O	O	O	O	O(1)	O	O	7(1)	19(1)
Hiroshi Ninomiya	11(9)	O	-	-	-	-	-	-	1(0)	12(9)
Masashi Watanabe	11(5)	O	-	O	O(1)	O	O	O	6(1)	17(6)
Koji Sasaki	11(1)	-	-	O	O	O	-	-	3(0)	14(1)
Shigeo Yaegashi	11(0)	O	O	O(1)	O	O(1)	O	O	7(2)	18(2)
Masakatsu Miyamoto	10(0)	O	O	O	O	O	-	O	6(0)	16(0)
Ken Naganuma	3(1)	-	-	-	-	-	-	O	1(0)	4(1)
Takehiko Kawanishi	2(0)	-	-	O	O	O	O	O	5(0)	7(0)
Hiroshi Saeki	2(0)	-	O	-	-	-	O	-	2(0)	4(0)
Tsukasa Hosaka	1(0)	O	O	O	O	O	-	O	6(0)	7(0)
Teruki Miyamoto	0(0)	-	O	O(1)	O(2)	O	-	O	5(3)	5(3)
Hiroshi Katayama	0(0)	-	-	O	O	O	O	-	4(0)	4(0)
Ryuichi Sugiyama	0(0)	O	O	-	-	-	O	-	3(0)	3(0)
Takayuki Kuwata	0(0)	O(1)	-	-	-	-	O	-	2(1)	2(1)
Kenji Tochio	0(0)	O	O	-	-	-	-	-	2(0)	2(0)
Shozo Tsugitani	0(0)	-	-	-	-	-	O	O	2(0)	2(0)
Tatsuya Shiji	0(0)	O(1)	-	-	-	-	-	-	1(1)	1(1)
Ryozo Suzuki	0(0)	-	-	-	-	-	O	-	1(0)	1(0)

== Births ==
- 2 September: Toshinobu Katsuya
