= 1962 in Japanese football =

1962 season

This articles details notable events occurring in Japanese football in 1962. In 1962, the Japan national football team went 1-2-4 in international play, with its only win coming against the Thailand national football team. That year, Chuo University won the Emperor's Cup.

== Emperor's Cup ==
May 6, 1962

Chuo University	2–1	Furukawa Electric
? (?) ? (?)		? (?)

Nishikyogoku Athletic Stadium

== National team ==
=== Results ===
1962.08.25	Japan	3–1	Thailand	Jakarta, Indonesia
	T. Miyamoto 49'; Kuwata 55'; Yaegashi 70'	JFA	? (?)

1962.08.29	Japan	0–2	India	Jakarta, Indonesia
		JFA	? (?) ? (?)

1962.08.30	Japan	0–1	South Korea	Jakarta, Indonesia
		JFA	? (?)	Attendance: 90,000

1962.09.08	Japan	2–2	Malaya	Kuala Lumpur, Malaya
	Yaegashi 17'; Kawabuchi 41'	JFA	? (?) ? (?)

1962.09.12	Japan	1–1	Pakistan	Kuala Lumpur, Malaya
	Yaegashi 41'	JFA	? (?)

1962.09.15	Japan	1–3	Burma	Kuala Lumpur, Malaya
	Kawabuchi 19'	JFA	? (?) ? (?) ? (?)

1962.09.21	Japan	1–2	Singapore	Singapore
	Kamata 87'	JFA	? (?) ? (?)

=== Players statistics ===
Player	-1961	08.25	08.29	08.30	09.08	09.12	09.15	09.21	1962	Total
Ryuzo Hiraki	27(1)	O	O	-	-	O	-	-	3(0)	30(1)
Yasuo Takamori	25(0)	-	-	O	O	-	O	-	3(0)	28(0)
Michihiro Ozawa	23(0)	O	O	O	O	O	O	O	7(0)	30(0)
Mitsuo Kamata	19(1)	O	O	O	O	O	O	O(1)	7(1)	26(2)
Saburo Kawabuchi	18(6)	O	O	O	O(1)	O	O(1)	-	6(2)	24(8)
Shigeo Yaegashi	18(2)	O(1)	O	O	O(1)	O(1)	O	O	7(3)	25(5)
Masashi Watanabe	17(6)	-	-	O	-	-	O	O	3(0)	20(6)
Yoshio Furukawa	17(0)	-	-	-	-	O	-	O	2(0)	19(0)
Masakatsu Miyamoto	16(0)	O	O	O	O	O	O	O	7(0)	23(0)
Masao Uchino	15(3)	-	-	O	O	O	-	-	3(0)	18(3)
Tsukasa Hosaka	7(0)	O	O	O	O	-	O	O	6(0)	13(0)
Takehiko Kawanishi	7(0)	-	-	-	-	-	-	O	1(0)	8(0)
Teruki Miyamoto	5(3)	O(1)	O	O	O	O	O	O	7(1)	12(4)
Hiroshi Katayama	4(0)	-	-	-	-	-	-	O	1(0)	5(0)
Ryuichi Sugiyama	3(0)	O	O	-	O	O	O	O	6(0)	9(0)
Takayuki Kuwata	2(1)	O(1)	-	-	-	-	O	O	3(1)	5(2)
Shozo Tsugitani	2(0)	-	O	-	-	-	-	O	2(0)	4(0)
Ryozo Suzuki	1(0)	O	O	O	O	O	O	O	7(0)	8(0)
Yoshinobu Ishii	0(0)	-	-	-	-	-	-	O	1(0)	1(0)

== Births ==
- 5 January: Shinobu Ikeda
