= 1968 in Japanese football =

1968 season

Japanese football in 1968

== Japan Soccer League ==
Pos	Team	Pld	W	D	L	GF	GA	GD	Pts	Qualification
1	Toyo Industries	14	10	1	3	31	11	+20	21	Champions
2	Yanmar Diesel	14	7	5	2	29	18	+11	19	
3	Mitsubishi Motors	14	7	4	3	25	18	+7	18	
4	Yawata Steel	14	7	3	4	32	19	+13	17	
5	Furukawa Electric	14	7	3	4	24	17	+7	17	
6	Nagoya Mutual Bank	14	3	3	8	17	25	−8	9	
7	Hitachi	14	3	2	9	17	31	−14	8	To promotion/relegation Series
8	Nippon Kokan	14	0	3	11	10	46	−36	3	To promotion/relegation Series

== Emperor's Cup ==
January 1, 1969

Yanmar Diesel	1–0	Mitsubishi Motors
? (?)

National Stadium

== National team ==
=== Results ===
1968.03.30	Japan	2–2	Australia	Sydney, Australia
	Kamamoto 18', 65'	JFA	? (?) ? (?)	Attendance: 8,646

1968.03.31	Japan	1–3	Australia	Melbourne, Australia
	Kuwahara 32'	JFA	? (?) ? (?) ? (?)	Attendance: 9,974

1968.04.04	Japan	3–1	Australia	Adelaide, Australia
	Sugiyama 80'; Kamamoto 84', 88'	JFA	? (?)	Attendance: 6,127

1968.10.14	Japan	3–1	Nigeria	Puebla, Mexico
	Kamamoto 24', 73', 89'	JFA	? (?)	Attendance: 10,000

=== Players statistics ===
Player	-1967	03.30	03.31	04.04	10.14	1968	Total
Shigeo Yaegashi	41(11)	O	O	O	O	4(0)	45(11)
Mitsuo Kamata	37(2)	O	-	O	O	3(0)	40(2)
Masakatsu Miyamoto	36(1)	-	O	-	O	2(0)	38(1)
Masashi Watanabe	34(11)	-	O	O	-	2(0)	36(11)
Teruki Miyamoto	33(15)	O	O	O	O	4(0)	37(15)
Ryuichi Sugiyama	31(11)	O	O	O(1)	O	4(1)	35(12)
Hiroshi Katayama	26(0)	O	-	O	O	3(0)	29(0)
Ryozo Suzuki	22(0)	O	-	O	-	2(0)	24(0)
Kunishige Kamamoto	17(21)	O(2)	O	O(2)	O(3)	4(7)	21(28)
Aritatsu Ogi	16(5)	O	-	O	O	3(0)	19(5)
Yoshitada Yamaguchi	16(0)	O	O	O	-	3(0)	19(0)
Kenzo Yokoyama	16(0)	O	-	O	O	3(0)	19(0)
Hisao Kami	13(0)	O	O	-	-	2(0)	15(0)
Takaji Mori	9(1)	O	O	O	O	4(0)	13(1)
Ikuo Matsumoto	7(1)	O	-	-	O	2(0)	9(1)
Yasuyuki Kuwahara	5(3)	-	O(1)	-	O	2(1)	7(4)
Takeo Kimura	3(1)	O	O	-	-	2(0)	5(1)
Kiyoshi Tomizawa	3(0)	-	O	-	-	1(0)	4(0)
Koji Funamoto	1(0)	-	O	-	-	1(0)	2(0)
Junji Kawano	0(0)	-	O	-	-	1(0)	1(0)

== Births ==
- 22 March: Kazuya Maekawa
