= 1966 in Japanese football =

1966 season

1966 in Japanese football

== Japan Soccer League ==
Pos	Team	Pld	W	D	L	GF	GA	GD	Pts	Qualification
1	Toyo Industries	14	12	1	1	43	6	+37	25	Champions
2	Yawata Steel	14	10	1	3	33	16	+17	21	
3	Furukawa Electric	14	9	2	3	30	17	+13	20	
4	Mitsubishi Motors	14	8	2	4	24	24	0	18	
5	Hitachi	14	5	3	6	24	28	−4	13	
6	Toyoda Automatic Loom Works	14	2	3	9	10	29	−19	7	
7	Nagoya Mutual Bank	14	2	0	12	12	34	−22	4	To Promotion/relegation Series
8	Yanmar Diesel	14	1	2	11	7	29	−22	4	To Promotion/relegation Series

== Emperor's Cup ==
January 15, 1967

Waseda University	3–2	Toyo Industries
? (?) ? (?) ? (?)		? (?) ? (?)

Komazawa Olympic Park Stadium

== National team ==
=== Results ===
1966.12.10	Japan	2–1	India	Bangkok, Thailand
	T. Miyamoto 51', 53'	JFA	? (?)	Attendance: 10,000

1966.12.11	Japan	3–1	Iran	Bangkok, Thailand
	Kamamoto 49'; Sugiyama 75'; Ogi 88'	JFA	? (?)	Attendance: 10,000

1966.12.14	Japan	1–0	Malaysia	Bangkok, Thailand
	Kamamoto 26'	JFA		Attendance: 40,000

1966.12.16	Japan	5–1	Singapore	Bangkok, Thailand
	Kamamoto 14', 89'; T. Miyamoto 20'; Watanabe 30'; Sugiyama 43'	JFA	? (?)	Attendance: 5,000

1966.12.17	Japan	5–1	Thailand	Bangkok, Thailand
	Kuwahara 2', 65'; Kamamoto 23'; Ogi 48'; Matsumoto 61'	JFA	? (?)	Attendance: 30,000

1966.12.18	Japan	0–1	Iran	Bangkok, Thailand
		JFA	? (?)	Attendance: 20,000

1966.12.19	Japan	2–0	Singapore	Bangkok, Thailand
	Kimura 48'; Kamamoto 89'	JFA		Attendance: 15,000

=== Players statistics ===
Player	-1965	12.10	12.11	12.14	12.16	12.17	12.18	12.19	1966	Total
Shigeo Yaegashi	36(11)	O	O	-	-	-	-	-	2(0)	38(11)
Masakatsu Miyamoto	30(1)	-	O	O	O	O	-	O	5(0)	35(1)
Masashi Watanabe	29(9)	-	-	-	O(1)	-	O	-	2(1)	31(10)
Teruki Miyamoto	23(7)	O(2)	O	O	O(1)	O	-	-	5(3)	28(10)
Ryuichi Sugiyama	20(5)	O	O(1)	O	O(1)	-	O	O	6(2)	26(7)
Ryozo Suzuki	16(0)	-	O	O	O	O	O	O	6(0)	22(0)
Hiroshi Katayama	15(0)	O	O	O	O	O	O	-	6(0)	21(0)
Kunishige Kamamoto	5(4)	O	O(1)	O(1)	O(2)	O(1)	O	O(1)	7(6)	12(10)
Yoshitada Yamaguchi	5(0)	O	O	O	O	O	O	O	7(0)	12(0)
Kenzo Yokoyama	5(0)	O	O	O	O	O	O	-	6(0)	11(0)
Aritatsu Ogi	4(0)	O	O(1)	O	O	O(1)	O	O	7(2)	11(2)
Hisao Kami	4(0)	O	O	O	O	-	-	O	5(0)	9(0)
Yasuyuki Kuwahara	0(0)	-	-	O	-	O(2)	O	O	4(2)	4(2)
Ikuo Matsumoto	0(0)	O	O	O	-	O(1)	-	-	4(1)	4(1)
Takaji Mori	0(0)	-	-	-	O	O	O	O	4(0)	4(0)
Kazuo Imanishi	0(0)	O	-	-	-	O	O	-	3(0)	3(0)
Takeo Kimura	0(0)	-	-	-	-	O	-	O(1)	2(1)	2(1)
Masahiro Hamazaki	0(0)	-	-	-	O	-	-	O	2(0)	2(0)

== Births ==
- 27 December: Masahiro Fukuda
