= 1958 in Japanese football =

1958 season

Japanese football in 1958.

== Emperor's Cup ==
September 9, 1958

Kwangaku Club	2–1	Yawata Steel
? ?' ? ?'		? ?'

Fujieda Higashi High School Ground

== National team ==
=== Results ===
1958.05.26	Japan	0–1	Philippines	Tokyo, Japan
		JFA	? ?'	Stadium: Tokyo Football Stadium

1958.05.28	Japan	0–2	Hong Kong	Tokyo, Japan
		JFA	? ?' ? ?'	Stadium: Tokyo National Stadium

1958.12.25	Japan	2–5	Hong Kong	Hong Kong
	Kawabuchi 15', 34'	JFA	? ?' ? ?' ? ?' ? ?' ? ?'

1958.12.28	Japan	2–6	Malaya	Kuala Lumpur, Malaya
	Kitaguchi 5'; Watanabe 16'	JFA	? ?' ? ?' ? ?' ? ?' ? ?' ? ?'

=== Players statistics ===
Player	-1957	05.26	05.28	12.25	12.28	1958	Total
Ryuzo Hiraki	10(0)	O	O	O	O	4(0)	14(0)
Takashi Takabayashi	8(2)	-	O	-	-	1(0)	9(2)
Yasuo Takamori	8(0)	O	O	O	O	4(0)	12(0)
Hiroaki Sato	8(0)	O	O	O	O	4(0)	12(0)
Masao Uchino	7(2)	O	-	-	-	1(0)	8(2)
Isao Iwabuchi	6(2)	O	O	-	-	2(0)	8(2)
Michihiro Ozawa	3(0)	O	O	O	O	4(0)	7(0)
Yoshio Furukawa	3(0)	O	O	O	-	3(0)	6(0)
Waichiro Omura	3(0)	O	O	-	-	2(0)	5(0)
Shigeo Yaegashi	3(0)	O	O	-	-	2(0)	5(0)
Ken Naganuma	2(1)	-	O	-	-	1(0)	3(1)
Akira Kitaguchi	0(0)	O	-	O	O(1)	3(1)	3(1)
Saburo Kawabuchi	0(0)	-	-	O(2)	O	2(2)	2(2)
Masashi Watanabe	0(0)	-	-	O	O(1)	2(1)	2(1)
Mitsuo Kamata	0(0)	-	-	O	O	2(0)	2(0)
Hiroshi Ninomiya	0(0)	-	-	O	O	2(0)	2(0)
Koji Sasaki	0(0)	-	-	O	O	2(0)	2(0)
Kenzo Ohashi	0(0)	O	-	-	-	1(0)	1(0)
Yoshinori Shigematsu	0(0)	-	O	-	-	1(0)	1(0)
Masakatsu Miyamoto	0(0)	-	-	O	-	1(0)	1(0)
Hiroshi Saeki	0(0)	-	-	O	-	1(0)	1(0)
Gyoji Matsumoto	0(0)	-	-	-	O	1(0)	1(0)

== Births ==
- February 4 - Kazuaki Nagasawa
- February 11 - Hiroshi Yoshida
- February 16 - Nobutoshi Kaneda
- March 29 - Tsutomu Sonobe
- April 4 - Masakuni Yamamoto
- April 5 - Ryoichi Kawakatsu
- July 19 - Kazushi Kimura
- August 8 - Akihiro Nishimura
- September 4 - Satoshi Tezuka
- October 19 - Hiromi Hara
- December 22 - Masaaki Kato
