= 1959 in Japanese football =

1959 season

Japanese football in 1959

== Emperor's Cup ==
May 6, 1959

Kwangaku Club	1–0	Chuo University
? (?)

Koishikawa Football Stadium

== National team ==
=== Results ===
1959.01.04	Japan	3–1	Malaya	Penang, Malaya
	Kawabuchi 21'; Ninomiya 51'; Watanabe 53'	JFA	? (?)

1959.01.10	Japan	4–3	Singapore	Singapore
	Ninomiya 9', 67'; Kawabuchi 46'; Watanabe 55'	JFA	? (?) ? (?) ? (?)

1959.01.11	Japan	2–3	Singapore	Singapore
	Watanabe 41'; Kawabuchi 60'	JFA	? (?) ? (?) ? (?)

1959.08.31	Japan	1–1 (a.e.t.)	Hong Kong	Kuala Lumpur, Malaya
	Watanabe 65'	JFA	? (?)	Attendance: 18,000

1959.09.02	Japan	2–4	Hong Kong	Kuala Lumpur, Malaya
	Ninomiya 65', 78'	JFA	? (?) ? (?) ? (?) ? (?)	Attendance: 20,000

1959.09.03	Japan	4–1	Singapore	Kuala Lumpur, Malaya
	Hiraki 25'; Ninomiya 52', 58', 75'	JFA	? (?)	Attendance: 13,000

1959.09.05	Japan	0–0	South Korea	Kuala Lumpur, Malaya
		JFA		Attendance: 14,000

1959.09.06	Japan	1–3	South Korea	Kuala Lumpur, Malaya
	Uchino 12'	JFA	? (?) ? (?) ? (?)	Attendance: 20,000

1959.12.13	Japan	0–2	South Korea	Tokyo, Japan
		JFA	? (?) ? (?)	Stadium: Korakuen Velodrome; Attendance: 30,000

1959.12.20	Japan	1–0	South Korea	Tokyo, Japan
	Ninomiya 70'	JFA		Stadium: Korakuen Velodrome; Attendance: 10,000

=== Players statistics ===
Player	-1958	01.04	01.10	01.11	08.31	09.02	09.03	09.05	09.06	12.13	12.20	1959	Total
Ryuzo Hiraki	14(0)	O	O	O	O	O	O(1)	O	O	O	O	10(1)	24(1)
Yasuo Takamori	12(0)	O	O	O	O	O	O	O	O	O	O	10(0)	22(0)
Hiroaki Sato	12(0)	O	O	O	-	-	-	-	-	-	-	3(0)	15(0)
Masanori Tokita	9(2)	-	-	-	O	O	-	O	-	-	-	3(0)	12(2)
Masao Uchino	8(2)	-	-	-	-	-	O	O	O(1)	O	-	4(1)	12(3)
Michihiro Ozawa	7(0)	O	O	-	O	O	O	O	O	O	O	9(0)	16(0)
Yoshio Furukawa	6(0)	O	O	O	O	O	O	O	O	O	O	10(0)	16(0)
Shigeo Yaegashi	5(0)	-	-	-	O	O	O	O	O	-	-	5(0)	10(0)
Akira Kitaguchi	3(1)	O	O	O	O	-	O	-	O	O	-	7(0)	10(1)
Saburo Kawabuchi	2(2)	O(1)	O(1)	O(1)	O	O	O	O	O	-	O	9(3)	11(5)
Masashi Watanabe	2(1)	O(1)	O(1)	O(1)	O(1)	O	-	-	O	O	O	8(4)	10(5)
Mitsuo Kamata	2(0)	O	O	O	O	O	O	O	O	O	O	10(0)	12(0)
Hiroshi Ninomiya	2(0)	O(1)	O(2)	O	-	O(2)	O(3)	O	O	O	O(1)	9(9)	11(9)
Koji Sasaki	2(0)	O	O	O	O	-	O	O	-	O	O	8(0)	10(0)
Masakatsu Miyamoto	1(0)	-	O	-	O	O	O	O	O	O	O	8(0)	9(0)
Hiroshi Saeki	1(0)	-	-	O	-	-	-	-	-	-	-	1(0)	2(0)
Seishiro Shimatani	0(0)	-	-	O	-	-	-	-	-	-	-	1(0)	1(0)
Takehiko Kawanishi	0(0)	-	-	-	-	-	-	-	-	-	O	1(0)	1(0)

== Births ==
- June 29 - Atsushi Uchiyama
- July 1 - Naoji Ito
- July 26 - Hiroshi Soejima
- November 26 - Satoshi Miyauchi
- December 19 - Yasuhito Suzuki
