= 1964 in Japanese football =

1964 season

Japanese football in 1964

== Emperor's Cup ==
January 17, 1965

Yawata Steel	0–0	Furukawa Electric

Kobe Oji Stadium

== National team ==
=== Results ===
1964.03.03	Japan	2–1	Singapore	Singapore
	Kamamoto 38'; Yaegashi 50'	JFA	? (?)

1964.10.16	Japan	2–3	Ghana	Tokyo, Japan
	Sugiyama 12'; Yaegashi 52'	JFA	? (?) ? (?) ? (?)	Stadium: Komazawa Olympic Park Stadium; Attendance: 18,474

=== Players statistics ===
Player	-1963	03.03	10.16	1964	Total
Michihiro Ozawa	35(0)	O	-	1(0)	36(0)
Shigeo Yaegashi	30(9)	O(1)	O(1)	2(2)	32(11)
Mitsuo Kamata	30(2)	O	O	2(0)	32(2)
Masakatsu Miyamoto	27(0)	O	-	1(0)	28(0)
Masashi Watanabe	25(9)	O	-	1(0)	26(9)
Tsukasa Hosaka	18(0)	O	-	1(0)	19(0)
Teruki Miyamoto	17(6)	O	O	2(0)	19(6)
Ryuichi Sugiyama	14(1)	O	O(1)	2(1)	16(2)
Ryozo Suzuki	13(0)	O	O	2(0)	15(0)
Hiroshi Katayama	10(0)	-	O	1(0)	11(0)
Shozo Tsugitani	9(4)	O	-	1(0)	10(4)
Aritatsu Ogi	1(0)	-	O	1(0)	2(0)
Kunishige Kamamoto	0(0)	O(1)	O	2(1)	2(1)
Takao Nishiyama	0(0)	O	-	1(0)	1(0)
Nobuyuki Oishi	0(0)	O	-	1(0)	1(0)
Kenzo Yokoyama	0(0)	-	O	1(0)	1(0)
Yoshitada Yamaguchi	0(0)	-	O	1(0)	1(0)
Hisao Kami	0(0)	-	O	1(0)	1(0)

== Births ==
- 8 March: Yasuharu Sorimachi
