= 1965 in Japanese football =

1965 season

Japanese football in 1965

== Japan Soccer League ==
Pos	Team	Pld	W	D	L	GF	GA	GD	Pts	Qualification
1	Toyo Industries	14	12	2	0	44	9	+35	26	Champions
2	Yawata Steel	14	11	2	1	40	14	+26	24	
3	Furukawa Electric	14	10	0	4	32	20	+12	20	
4	Hitachi	14	8	1	5	35	19	+16	17	
5	Mitsubishi Motors	14	4	1	9	24	39	−15	9	
6	Toyoda Automatic Loom Works	14	2	3	9	16	31	−15	7	
7	Yanmar Diesel	14	2	1	11	9	41	−32	5	
8	Nagoya Mutual Bank	14	1	2	11	16	43	−27	4	To Promotion/relegation Series

== Emperor's Cup ==
January 16, 1966

Toyo Industries	3–2	Yawata Steel
? (?) ? (?) ? (?)		? (?) ? (?)

Komazawa Olympic Park Stadium

== National team ==
=== Results ===
1965.03.14	Japan	2–1	Hong Kong	Hong Kong
	Kamamoto 26', 41'	JFA	? (?)

1965.03.22	Japan	1–1	Burma	Rangoon, Burma
	Kamamoto 26'	JFA	? (?)	Attendance: 40,000

1965.03.25	Japan	4–1	Singapore	Singapore
	Sugiyama 6', 13', 26'; M. Miyamoto 65'	JFA	? (?)	Attendance: 10,000

1965.03.27	Japan	1–1	Malaysia	Kuala Lumpur, Malaysia
	T. Miyamoto 55'	JFA	? (?)	Attendance: 10,000

=== Players statistics ===
Player	-1964	03.14	03.22	03.25	03.27	1965	Total
Shigeo Yaegashi	32(11)	O	O	O	O	4(0)	36(11)
Mitsuo Kamata	32(2)	-	O	O	O	3(0)	35(2)
Masakatsu Miyamoto	28(0)	-	O	O(1)	-	2(1)	30(1)
Masashi Watanabe	26(9)	O	-	O	O	3(0)	29(9)
Saburo Kawabuchi	24(8)	O	O	-	-	2(0)	26(8)
Teruki Miyamoto	19(6)	O	O	O	O(1)	4(1)	23(7)
Ryuichi Sugiyama	16(2)	O	O	O(3)	O	4(3)	20(5)
Ryozo Suzuki	15(0)	-	O	-	-	1(0)	16(0)
Hiroshi Katayama	11(0)	O	O	O	O	4(0)	15(0)
Shozo Tsugitani	10(4)	-	O	-	O	2(0)	12(4)
Kunishige Kamamoto	2(1)	O(2)	O(1)	-	O	3(3)	5(4)
Aritatsu Ogi	2(0)	-	-	O	O	1(0)	4(0)
Kenzo Yokoyama	1(0)	O	O	O	O	4(0)	5(0)
Yoshitada Yamaguchi	1(0)	O	O	O	O	4(0)	5(0)
Hisao Kami	1(0)	O	O	-	O	3(0)	4(0)
Kiyoshi Tomizawa	0(0)	O	-	-	O	2(0)	2(0)
Katsuyoshi Kuwahara	0(0)	-	O	O	-	2(0)	2(0)
Takeshi Ono	0(0)	-	-	O	-	1(0)	1(0)
Masanobu Izumi	0(0)	-	-	O	-	1(0)	1(0)

== Births ==
- 6 September: Takumi Horiike
