= 1960 in Japanese football =

1960 season

Japanese football in 1960

== Emperor's Cup ==
May 6, 1960

Furukawa Electric	4–0	Keio BRB
? (?) ? (?) ? (?) ? (?)

Utsubo Football Stadium

== National team ==
=== Results ===
1960.11.06	Japan	1–2	South Korea	Seoul, South Korea
	Sasaki 20'	JFA	? (?) ? (?)	Attendance: 30,000

=== Players statistics ===
Player	-1959	11.06	1960	Total
Ryuzo Hiraki	24(1)	O	1(0)	25(1)
Yasuo Takamori	22(0)	O	1(0)	23(0)
Michihiro Ozawa	16(0)	O	1(0)	17(0)
Masao Uchino	12(3)	O	1(0)	13(3)
Saburo Kawabuchi	11(5)	O	1(0)	12(5)
Masashi Watanabe	10(5)	O	1(0)	11(5)
Koji Sasaki	10(0)	O(1)	1(1)	11(1)
Shigeo Yaegashi	10(0)	O	1(0)	11(0)
Masakatsu Miyamoto	9(0)	O	1(0)	10(0)
Takehiko Kawanishi	1(0)	O	1(0)	2(0)
Tsukasa Hosaka	0(0)	O	1(0)	1(0)

== Births ==
- 7 March: Kazuo Ozaki
