= 1967 in Japanese football =

1967 season

Japanese football in 1967

== Japan Soccer League ==
Pos	Team	Pld	W	D	L	GF	GA	GD	Pts	Qualification
1	Toyo Industries	14	10	2	2	37	16	+21	22	Champions
2	Furukawa Electric	14	8	4	2	39	22	+17	20	
3	Mitsubishi Motors	14	9	1	4	38	19	+19	19	
4	Yawata Steel	14	8	2	4	29	22	+7	18	
5	Yanmar Diesel	14	6	2	6	28	27	+1	14	
6	Hitachi	14	5	2	7	26	27	−1	12	
7	Nippon Kokan	14	2	1	11	16	40	−24	5	To promotion/relegation Series
8	Toyoda Automatic Loom Works	14	0	2	12	12	52	−40	2	To promotion/relegation Series

== Emperor's Cup ==
January 14, 1968

Toyo Industries	1–0	Mitsubishi Motors
? (?)

National Stadium

== National team ==
=== Results ===
1967.09.27	Japan	15–0	Philippines	Tokyo, Japan
	Sugiyama 4', 75'; Ogi 5'; Kamamoto 15', 16', 26', 43', 64', 89'; T. Miyamoto 20', 30', 40', 46'; Watanabe 63'; Kuwahara 78'	JFA		Stadium: Tokyo National Stadium; Attendance: 7,939

1967.09.30	Japan	4–0	Chinese Taipei	Tokyo, Japan
	Kamamoto 25', 67', 75'; Ogi 59'	JFA		Stadium: Tokyo National Stadium; Attendance: 7,181

1967.10.03	Japan	3–1	Lebanon	Tokyo, Japan
	Ogi 29'; Kamamoto 49'; Mori 85'	JFA	? (?)	Stadium: Tokyo National Stadium; Attendance: 2,693

1967.10.07	Japan	3–3	South Korea	Tokyo, Japan
	T. Miyamoto 13'; Sugiyama 37'; Kamamoto 70'	JFA	? (?) ? (?) ? (?)	Stadium: Tokyo National Stadium; Attendance: 45,789

1967.10.10	Japan	1–0	South Vietnam	Tokyo, Japan
	Sugiyama 50'	JFA		Stadium: Tokyo National Stadium; Attendance: 23,010

=== Players statistics ===
Player	-1966	09.27	09.30	10.03	10.07	10.10	1967	Total
Shigeo Yaegashi	38(11)	-	O	O	O	-	3(0)	41(11)
Mitsuo Kamata	35(2)	-	-	O	-	O	2(0)	37(2)
Masakatsu Miyamoto	35(1)	-	-	O	-	-	1(0)	36(1)
Masashi Watanabe	31(10)	O(1)	O	-	-	O	3(1)	34(11)
Teruki Miyamoto	28(10)	O(4)	O	O	O(1)	O	5(5)	33(15)
Ryuichi Sugiyama	26(7)	O(2)	O	O	O(1)	O(1)	5(4)	31(11)
Hiroshi Katayama	21(0)	O	O	O	O	O	5(0)	26(0)
Kunishige Kamamoto	12(10)	O(6)	O(3)	O(1)	O(1)	O	5(11)	17(21)
Yoshitada Yamaguchi	12(0)	O	O	-	O	O	4(0)	16(0)
Aritatsu Ogi	11(2)	O(1)	O(1)	O(1)	O	O	5(3)	16(5)
Kenzo Yokoyama	11(0)	O	O	O	O	O	5(0)	16(0)
Hisao Kami	9(0)	O	O	-	O	O	4(0)	13(0)
Yasuyuki Kuwahara	4(2)	O(1)	-	-	-	-	1(1)	5(3)
Ikuo Matsumoto	4(1)	-	-	O	O	O	3(0)	7(1)
Takaji Mori	4(0)	O	O	O(1)	O	O	5(1)	9(1)
Takeo Kimura	2(1)	-	-	O	-	-	1(0)	3(1)
Kiyoshi Tomizawa	2(0)	O	-	-	-	-	1(0)	3(0)
Koji Funamoto	0(0)	O	-	-	-	-	1(0)	1(0)

== Births ==
- 9 November: Yoshiro Moriyama
