= 1969 in Japanese football =

1969 season

Japanese football in 1969

== Japan Soccer League ==
Pos	Team	Pld	W	D	L	GF	GA	GD	Pts	Qualification
1	Mitsubishi Motors	14	10	4	0	29	8	+21	24	Champions
2	Toyo Industries	14	10	1	3	31	10	+21	21	
3	Yawata Steel	14	5	5	4	24	23	+1	15	
4	Furukawa Electric	14	5	4	5	20	20	0	14	
5	Yanmar Diesel	14	6	1	7	25	25	0	13	
6	Nippon Kokan	14	4	3	7	18	32	−14	11	
7	Hitachi	14	3	4	7	17	27	−10	10	To promotion/relegation series
8	Nagoya Mutual Bank	14	2	0	12	12	31	−19	4	To promotion/relegation series

== Emperor's Cup ==
January 1, 1970

Toyo Industries	4–1	Rikkyo University
? (?) ? (?) ? (?) ? (?)		? (?)

National Stadium

== National team ==
=== Results ===
1969.10.10	Japan	1–3	Australia	Seoul, South Korea
	Watanabe 10'	JFA	? (?) ? (?) ? (?)	Attendance: 10,000

1969.10.12	Japan	2–2	South Korea	Seoul, South Korea
	T. Miyamoto 33'; Kuwahara 50'	JFA	? (?) ? (?)	Attendance: 35,000

1969.10.16	Japan	1–1	Australia	Seoul, South Korea
	T. Miyamoto 4'	JFA	? (?)	Attendance: 5,000

1969.10.18	Japan	0–2	South Korea	Seoul, South Korea
		JFA	? (?) ? (?)	Attendance: 25,000

=== Players statistics ===
Player	-1968	10.10	10.12	10.16	10.18	1969	Total
Mitsuo Kamata	40(2)	O	O	O	O	4(0)	44(2)
Masakatsu Miyamoto	38(1)	O	-	-	O	2(0)	40(1)
Teruki Miyamoto	37(15)	O	O(1)	O(1)	-	3(2)	40(17)
Masashi Watanabe	36(11)	O(1)	-	O	O	3(1)	39(12)
Ryuichi Sugiyama	35(12)	O	O	O	O	4(0)	39(12)
Hiroshi Katayama	29(0)	O	O	O	O	4(0)	33(0)
Aritatsu Ogi	19(5)	O	O	O	O	4(0)	23(5)
Yoshitada Yamaguchi	19(0)	O	O	O	O	4(0)	23(0)
Kenzo Yokoyama	19(0)	O	O	O	-	3(0)	22(0)
Takaji Mori	13(1)	O	O	O	O	4(0)	17(1)
Ikuo Matsumoto	9(1)	-	O	O	-	2(0)	11(1)
Yasuyuki Kuwahara	7(4)	O	O(1)	O	O	4(1)	11(5)
Takeo Kimura	5(1)	O	-	-	-	1(0)	6(1)
Koji Funamoto	2(0)	-	-	-	O	1(0)	3(0)
Junji Kawano	1(0)	-	-	O	-	1(0)	2(0)
Yoshio Kikugawa	0(0)	-	O	-	O	2(0)	2(0)
Tsuyoshi Kunieda	0(0)	-	-	O	O	2(0)	2(0)
Tadao Onishi	0(0)	O	-	-	-	1(0)	1(0)
Eizo Yuguchi	0(0)	-	-	-	O	1(0)	1(0)

== Births ==
- 25 June: Yasuto Honda
