= 1973 in Japanese football =

1973 season

Japanese football in 1973

== Japan Soccer League ==
=== Division 1 ===
Pos	Team	Pld	W	D	L	GF	GA	GD	Pts	Qualification
1	Mitsubishi Motors	18	14	2	2	35	12	+23	30	Champions
2	Hitachi	18	12	1	5	35	18	+17	25	
3	Yanmar Diesel	18	10	3	5	40	17	+23	23	
4	Towa Real Estate	18	9	3	6	29	22	+7	21	
5	Furukawa Electric	18	9	3	6	31	27	+4	21	
6	Nippon Steel	18	7	2	9	25	26	−1	16	
7	Toyota Motors	18	5	5	8	22	31	−9	15	
8	Toyo Industries	18	4	6	8	16	28	−12	14	
9	Nippon Kokan	18	4	4	10	24	32	−8	12	To promotion/relegation Series
10	Tanabe Pharmaceutical	18	1	1	16	7	51	−44	3	To promotion/relegation Series

=== Division 2 ===
Pos	Team	Pld	W	D	L	GF	GA	GD	Pts	Qualification
1	Eidai Industries	18	11	4	3	51	24	+27	26	To promotion/relegation Series with Division 1
2	Kofu SC	18	12	2	4	39	25	+14	26	To promotion/relegation Series with Division 1
3	Yomiuri	18	10	4	4	40	21	+19	24	
4	Fujitsu	18	9	4	5	33	28	+5	22	
5	NTT Kinki	18	8	5	5	31	29	+2	21	
6	Dainichi Nippon Cable Industries	18	5	6	7	30	34	−4	16	
7	Kyoto Shiko	18	5	4	9	31	35	−4	14	
8	Teijin Matsuyama	18	4	5	9	21	43	−22	13	
9	Toyoda Automatic Loom Works	18	2	5	11	30	34	−4	9	To promotion/relegation Series with Senior Cup Finalists
10	Hagoromo Club	18	3	3	12	25	48	−23	9	To promotion/relegation Series with Senior Cup Finalists

== Emperor's Cup ==
January 1, 1974

Mitsubishi Motors	2–1	Hitachi
? (?) ? (?)		? (?)

National Stadium

== National team ==
=== Results ===
1973.05.16	Japan	1–2	Israel	Seoul, South Korea
	Hirasawa 28'	JFA	? (?) ? (?)	Attendance: 20,000

1973.05.20	Japan	4–0	South Vietnam	Seoul, South Korea
	Kamamoto 6', 87'; Mori 19'; 49' (o.g.)	JFA		Attendance: 10,000

1973.05.22	Japan	0–1	Hong Kong	Seoul, South Korea
		JFA	? (?)	Attendance: 10,000

1973.05.26	Japan	0–1 (a.e.t.)	Israel	Seoul, South Korea
		JFA	? (?)	Attendance: 35,000

1973.06.23	Japan	0–2	South Korea	Seoul, South Korea
		JFA	? (?) ? (?)	Attendance: 35,000

=== Players statistics ===
Player	-1972	05.16	05.20	05.22	05.26	06.23	1973	Total
Aritatsu Ogi	49(11)	O	O	O	O	O	5(0)	54(11)
Yoshitada Yamaguchi	46(0)	-	O	O	-	O	3(0)	49(0)
Kenzo Yokoyama	43(0)	-	O	-	O	-	2(0)	45(0)
Kunishige Kamamoto	41(54)	-	O(2)	O	O	-	3(2)	44(56)
Takaji Mori	41(1)	-	O(1)	-	-	-	1(1)	42(2)
Daishiro Yoshimura	18(4)	O	O	-	-	O	3(0)	21(4)
Kozo Arai	18(2)	O	O	O	O	O	5(0)	23(2)
Nobuo Kawakami	13(0)	O	O	O	O	O	5(0)	18(0)
Minoru Kobata	11(0)	-	O	-	-	O	2(0)	13(0)
Kazumi Takada	9(0)	O	O	O	-	-	3(0)	12(0)
Koji Funamoto	9(0)	O	-	-	-	O	2(0)	11(0)
Nobuo Fujishima	7(0)	-	O	O	O	O	4(0)	11(0)
Kuniya Daini	6(0)	O	O	O	O	-	4(0)	10(0)
Atsuyoshi Furuta	5(0)	O	-	O	O	-	3(0)	8(0)
Mitsunori Fujiguchi	5(0)	O	-	-	-	O	2(0)	7(0)
Yoshikazu Nagai	4(1)	O	O	O	O	O	5(0)	9(1)
Michio Ashikaga	4(0)	O	-	-	O	-	2(0)	6(0)
Shusaku Hirasawa	2(0)	O(1)	O	-	O	O	4(1)	6(1)
Noritaka Hidaka	1(0)	O	-	-	O	O	3(0)	4(0)
Akira Matsunaga	0(0)	-	-	O	O	O	3(0)	3(0)
Tatsuhiko Seta	0(0)	-	-	O	-	O	2(0)	2(0)

== Births ==
- 29 October: Masakiyo Maezono
