= 1972 in Japanese football =

1972 season

1972 in Japanese football is an overview of events relating to football in the Japanese culture.

== Japan Soccer League ==
=== Division 1 ===
Pos	Team	Pld	W	D	L	GF	GA	GD	Pts	Qualification
1	Hitachi	14	9	3	2	36	16	+20	21	Champions
2	Yanmar Diesel	14	7	6	1	30	11	+19	20	
3	Toyo Industries	14	7	2	5	20	13	+7	16	
4	Mitsubishi Motors	14	5	6	3	26	19	+7	16	
5	Nippon Kokan	14	4	5	5	15	18	−3	13	
6	Nippon Steel	14	4	4	6	22	30	−8	12	
7	Furukawa Electric	14	3	2	9	17	41	−24	8	
8	Towa Real Estate	14	2	2	10	11	29	−18	6	

=== Division 2 ===
Pos	Team	Pld	W	D	L	GF	GA	GD	Pts	Promotion
1	Toyota Motors	18	13	4	1	34	16	+18	30	Promoted to First Division
2	Tanabe Pharmaceutical	18	10	6	2	37	22	+15	26	Promoted to First Division
3	Kofu SC	18	9	3	6	33	21	+12	21	
4	Kyoto Shiko	18	7	3	8	19	23	−4	17	
5	Fujitsu	18	4	9	5	26	31	−5	17	
6	Nippon Light Metal	18	7	2	9	31	33	−2	16	
7	Yomiuri	18	7	1	10	27	31	−4	15	
8	Dainichi Nippon Cable Industries	18	5	4	9	36	40	−4	14	
9	NTT Kinki	18	4	6	8	21	25	−4	14	
10	Toyoda Automatic Loom Works	18	4	2	12	14	36	−22	10	

== Japanese Regional Leagues ==
All Japan Senior Football Championship finalists Eidai Industries and Teijin Matsuyama were promoted to the Second Division.

== Emperor's Cup ==
January 1, 1973

Hitachi	2–1	Yanmar Diesel

National Stadium

== National team ==
=== Results ===
1972.07.12	Japan	4–1	Khmer	Kuala Lumpur, Malaysia
	Kamamoto 50', 65', 71', 89'	JFA	? (?)

1972.07.16	Japan	5–0	Sri Lanka	Ipoh, Malaysia
	Kamamoto 7', 11', 60', 65', 89'	JFA

1972.07.18	Japan	5–1	Philippines	Kuala Lumpur, Malaysia
	Ogi 21'; Arai 39', 47'; Okudera 44'; Kamamoto 68'	JFA	? (?)

1972.07.22	Japan	1–3	Malaysia	Kuala Lumpur, Malaysia
	Kamamoto 15'	JFA	? (?) ? (?) ? (?)	Attendance: 40,000

1972.07.26	Japan	0–3	South Korea	Kuala Lumpur, Malaysia
		JFA	? (?) ? (?) ? (?)	Attendance: 30,000

1972.08.04	Japan	4–1	Philippines	Singapore
	Kamamoto 29', 83'; Yoshimura 71'; Ogi 75'	JFA	? (?)	Attendance: 15,000

1972.08.06	Japan	0–1	Indonesia	Singapore
		JFA	? (?)

1972.09.14	Japan	2–2	South Korea	Tokyo, Japan
	Kamamoto 19', 89'	JFA	? (?) ? (?)	Stadium: Tokyo National Stadium; Attendance: 15,000

=== Players statistics ===
Player	-1971	07.12	07.16	07.18	07.22	07.26	08.04	08.06	09.14	1972	Total
Aritatsu Ogi	41(9)	O	O	O(1)	O	O	O(1)	O	O	8(2)	49(11)
Yoshitada Yamaguchi	41(0)	O	O	O	O	O	-	-	-	5(0)	46(0)
Kenzo Yokoyama	40(0)	-	O	-	O	O	-	-	-	3(0)	43(0)
Kunishige Kamamoto	33(39)	O(4)	O(5)	O(1)	O(1)	O	O(2)	O	O(2)	8(15)	41(54)
Takaji Mori	33(1)	O	O	O	O	O	O	O	O	8(0)	41(1)
Nelson Yoshimura	10(3)	O	O	O	O	O	O(1)	O	O	8(1)	18(4)
Kozo Arai	10(0)	O	O	O(2)	O	O	O	O	O	8(2)	18(2)
Nobuo Kawakami	5(0)	O	O	O	O	O	O	O	O	8(0)	13(0)
Kazumi Takada	4(0)	O	O	-	-	O	-	O	O	5(0)	9(0)
Koji Funamoto	4(0)	O	-	O	-	-	O	O	O	5(0)	9(0)
Seiichi Sakiya	2(0)	-	-	-	-	-	-	O	-	2(0)	3(0)
Nobuo Fujishima	1(0)	O	-	O	O	-	O	O	O	6(0)	7(0)
Atsuyoshi Furuta	1(0)	-	O	O	-	-	-	O	O	4(0)	5(0)
Michio Ashikaga	1(0)	-	-	-	-	-	O	O	O	3(0)	4(0)
Yasuhiko Okudera	0(0)	O	O	O(1)	O	O	-	-	O	6(1)	6(1)
Kuniya Daini	0(0)	O	O	-	O	O	O	-	O	6(0)	6(0)
Mitsunori Fujiguchi	0(0)	O	-	O	O	O	O	-	-	5(0)	5(0)
George Kobayashi	0(0)	-	O	O	O	-	-	-	-	3(0)	3(0)
Shusaku Hirasawa	0(0)	-	-	-	-	-	O	O	-	2(0)	2(0)
Noritaka Hidaka	0(0)	-	-	-	-	-	-	-	O	1(0)	1(0)

== Births ==
- 28 November: Hiroshi Nanami
