= 1975 in Japanese football =

1975 season

Japanese football in 1975

== Japan Soccer League ==
=== Division 1 ===
Pos	Team	Pld	W	D	L	GF	GA	GD	Pts	Qualification
1	Yanmar Diesel	18	14	3	1	44	11	+33	31	Champions
2	Mitsubishi Motors	18	13	3	2	30	16	+14	29	
3	Hitachi	18	10	5	3	31	11	+20	25	
4	Nippon Steel	18	9	3	6	28	23	+5	21	
5	Eidai Industries	18	8	2	8	30	29	+1	18	
6	Furukawa Electric	18	6	5	7	34	22	+12	17	
7	Fujita	18	5	3	10	19	31	−12	13	
8	Toyo Industries	18	4	4	10	20	29	−9	12	
9	Nippon Kokan	18	4	3	11	15	32	−17	11	To promotion/relegation series
10	Toyota Motors	18	0	3	15	17	64	−47	3	To promotion/relegation series

=== Division 2 ===
Pos	Team	Pld	W	D	L	GF	GA	GD	Pts	Qualification
1	Tanabe Pharmaceutical	18	12	3	3	36	17	+19	27	To promotion/relegation series with Division 1
2	Yomiuri	18	11	4	3	43	16	+27	26	To promotion/relegation series with Division 1
3	Fujitsu	18	10	6	2	37	17	+20	26	
4	Honda	18	10	2	6	33	29	+4	22	
5	Teijin Matsuyama	18	8	3	7	31	34	−3	19	
6	Kyoto Shiko	18	5	5	8	18	20	−2	15	
7	Kofu SC	18	5	4	9	27	34	−7	14	
8	Sumitomo Metal	18	3	6	9	27	38	−11	12	
9	NTT Kinki	18	4	2	12	25	52	−27	10	To promotion/relegation series with Senior Cup finalists
10	Dainichi Nippon Cable Industries	18	3	3	12	19	39	−20	9	To promotion/relegation series with Senior Cup finalists

== Emperor's Cup ==
January 1, 1976

Hitachi	2–0	Fujita Industries
? (?) ? (?)

National Stadium

== National team ==
=== Results ===
1975.06.14	Japan	0–0 (4–3 p)	Hong Kong	Hong Kong
		JFA		Attendance: 26,000

1975.06.17	Japan	0–1	North Korea	Hong Kong
		JFA	? (?)	Attendance: 30,000

1975.06.21	Japan	2–1	Singapore	Hong Kong
	Ochiai 41'; Nagai 83'	JFA	? (?)	Attendance: 20,000

1975.06.23	Japan	1–2	China PR	Hong Kong
	Arai 42'	JFA	? (?) ? (?)	Attendance: 20,000

1975.06.26	Japan	1–0	Hong Kong	Hong Kong
	Watanabe 6'	JFA		Attendance: 30,000

1975.07.30	Japan	0–2	Hong Kong	Kuala Lumpur, Malaysia
		JFA	? (?) ? (?)	Attendance: 5,000

1975.08.02	Japan	0–2	Malaysia	Kuala Lumpur, Malaysia
		JFA	? (?) ? (?)

1975.08.04	Japan	3–0	Bangladesh	Kuala Lumpur, Malaysia
	Kamamoto 10', 89'; Fujishima 50'	JFA

1975.08.07	Japan	4–1	Indonesia	Kuala Lumpur, Malaysia
	Kamamoto 31', 38'; Fujishima 32'; Maeda 89'	JFA	? (?)

1975.08.09	Japan	1–3	South Korea	Kuala Lumpur, Malaysia
	Ochiai 13'	JFA	? (?) ? (?) ? (?)

1975.08.11	Japan	4–0	Thailand	Kuala Lumpur, Malaysia
	Fujishima 8'; Yoshimura 22'; Watanabe 67'; Ochiai 83'	JFA

1975.08.14	Japan	2–0	Burma	Kuala Lumpur, Malaysia
	Watanabe 31'; Kamamoto 41'	JFA

1975.09.08	Japan	0–3	South Korea	Seoul, South Korea
		JFA	? (?) ? (?) ? (?)	Attendance: 20,000

=== Players statistics ===
Player	-1974	06.14	06.17	06.21	06.23	06.26	07.30	08.02	08.04	08.07	08.09	08.11	08.14	09.08	1975	Total
Kunishige Kamamoto	49(61)	-	-	-	-	-	O	O	O(2)	O(2)	O	-	O(1)	O	7(5)	56(66)
Takaji Mori	43(2)	O	O	O	O	-	O	O	-	-	O	O	O	-	9(0)	52(2)
Daishiro Yoshimura	28(6)	-	-	-	-	-	O	O	-	O	-	O(1)	O	O	6(1)	34(7)
Kozo Arai	28(3)	O	-	O	O(1)	-	-	-	-	-	-	-	-	-	3(1)	31(4)
Nobuo Kawakami	23(0)	O	O	O	O	O	O	O	-	-	-	-	O	O	9(0)	32(0)
Nobuo Fujishima	17(0)	O	O	O	-	O	O	O	O(1)	O(1)	O	O(1)	O	O	12(3)	29(3)
Kuniya Daini	17(0)	-	O	O	O	O	O	O	O	O	O	O	O	O	12(0)	29(0)
Yoshikazu Nagai	13(2)	O	O	O(1)	O	O	O	O	O	O	O	-	-	O	11(1)	24(3)
Atsuyoshi Furuta	13(0)	O	O	O	O	O	O	O	O	O	O	O	-	-	11(0)	24(0)
Kazumi Takada	12(0)	-	O	O	O	-	-	-	-	-	-	-	-	O	4(0)	16(0)
Koji Funamoto	11(0)	O	-	-	-	-	-	O	O	O	O	O	O	O	8(0)	19(0)
Mitsunori Fujiguchi	8(0)	O	O	-	O	O	-	-	-	-	-	-	-	-	4(0)	12(0)
Mitsuo Watanabe	7(1)	O	O	O	O	O(1)	O	O	O	O	O	O(1)	O(1)	-	12(3)	19(4)
Yasuhiko Okudera	6(1)	O	O	-	O	O	-	-	-	-	-	O	-	-	5(0)	11(1)
Michio Ashikaga	6(0)	-	-	-	-	-	-	-	-	-	-	-	-	O	1(0)	7(0)
Tatsuhiko Seta	5(0)	-	O	O	O	O	O	-	-	-	-	-	-	-	5(0)	10(0)
Shigemi Ishii	4(0)	-	-	-	-	O	-	-	-	-	-	-	-	-	1(0)	5(0)
Hiroshi Ochiai	2(0)	O	O	O(1)	O	O	O	O	O	O	O(1)	O(1)	O	O	13(3)	15(3)
Eijun Kiyokumo	1(0)	O	O	O	O	O	O	O	O	O	O	O	O	O	13(0)	14(0)
Masaki Yokotani	1(0)	O	-	-	-	O	O	O	O	O	O	O	O	O	10(0)	11(0)
Hideki Maeda	0(0)	-	-	-	-	-	-	-	O	O(1)	-	O	O	O	5(1)	5(1)
Mitsuhisa Taguchi	0(0)	-	-	-	-	-	-	-	-	-	-	-	-	O	1(0)	1(0)

== Births ==
- 17 June: Shoji Jo
