= 1950 in Japanese football =

1950 season

Japanese football in 1950.

== Emperor's Cup ==
June 4, 1950

All Kwangaku	6–1	Keio University
? ?' ? ?' ? ?' ? ?' ? ?' ? ?'		? ?'

Kariya Stadium

== Births ==
- April 8 - Nobuo Fujishima
- April 14 - Mitsuru Komaeda
- May 22 - Michio Ashikaga
- September 11 - Eijun Kiyokumo
- October 24 - Kozo Arai
- November 19 - Keizo Imai
- November 28 - George Yonashiro
- December 1 - Seiichi Sakiya
- December 30 - Kazuhisa Kono
