= 1974 in Japanese football =

1974 season

Japanese football in 1974

== Japan Soccer League ==
=== Division 1 ===
Pos	Team	Pld	W	D	L	GF	GA	GD	Pts	Qualification
1	Yanmar Diesel	18	10	5	3	47	24	+23	25	Champions
2	Mitsubishi Motors	18	11	3	4	37	18	+19	25	
3	Hitachi	18	7	5	6	33	22	+11	19	
4	Furukawa Electric	18	7	5	6	25	24	+1	19	
5	Nippon Steel	18	8	3	7	24	25	−1	19	
6	Toyo Industries	18	6	6	6	20	25	−5	18	
7	Nippon Kokan	18	6	5	7	24	28	−4	17	
8	Towa Real Estate	18	5	6	7	25	30	−5	16	
9	Eidai Industries	18	4	6	8	19	30	−11	14	To Promotion/relegation Series
10	Toyota Motors	18	3	2	13	8	36	−28	8	To Promotion/relegation Series

=== Division 2 ===
Pos	Team	Pld	W	D	L	GF	GA	GD	Pts	Qualification
1	Yomiuri	18	11	4	3	46	20	+26	26	To Promotion/relegation Series with Division 1
2	Fujitsu	18	9	4	5	32	19	+13	22	To Promotion/relegation Series with Division 1
3	Kyoto Shiko	18	9	4	5	27	20	+7	22	
4	NTT Kinki	18	8	4	6	30	24	+6	20	
5	Kofu SC	18	8	4	6	29	24	+5	20	
6	Teijin Matsuyama	18	7	5	6	29	33	−4	19	
7	Dainichi Nippon Cable Industries	18	7	3	8	32	27	+5	17	
8	Tanabe Pharmaceutical	18	7	2	9	33	31	+2	16	
9	Sumitomo Metal	18	4	4	10	23	48	−25	12	To Promotion/relegation Series with Senior Cup finalists
10	Ibaraki Hitachi	18	1	4	13	10	43	−33	6	To Promotion/relegation Series with Senior Cup finalists

== Emperor's Cup ==
January 1, 1975

Yanmar Diesel	2–1	Eidai Industries
? (?) ? (?)		? (?)

National Stadium

== National team ==
=== Results ===
1974.02.12	Japan	1–0	Singapore	Singapore
	Takabayashi 67'	JFA		Attendance: 5,000

1974.02.20	Japan	0–0	Hong Kong	Hong Kong
		JFA		Attendance: 7,820

1974.07.23	Japan	1–4	Romania	Constanța, Romania
	Nagai 78'	JFA	? (?) ? (?) ? (?) ? (?)	Attendance: 15,000

1974.09.03	Japan	4–0	Philippines	Tehrān, Iran
	Kamamoto 1', 11', 41'; Watanabe 77'	JFA		Attendance: 20,000

1974.09.05	Japan	1–1	Malaysia	Tehrān, Iran
	Yoshimura 65'	JFA	? (?)

1974.09.07	Japan	0–3	Israel	Tehrān, Iran
		JFA	? (?) ? (?) ? (?)	Attendance: 30,000

1974.09.28	Japan	4–1	South Korea	Tokyo, Japan
	Kamamoto 35', 53'; Yoshimura 39'; Arai 79'	JFA	? (?)	Stadium: Tokyo National Stadium; Attendance: 12,000

=== Players statistics ===
Player	-1973	02.12	02.20	07.23	09.03	09.05	09.07	09.28	1974	Total
Aritatsu Ogi	54(11)	O	O	O	O	O	O	-	6(0)	60(11)
Kenzo Yokoyama	45(0)	-	-	O	O	O	-	O	4(0)	49(0)
Kunishige Kamamoto	44(56)	-	-	O	O(3)	O	O	O(2)	5(5)	49(61)
Takaji Mori	42(2)	-	-	-	-	-	-	O	1(0)	43(2)
Kozo Arai	23(2)	O	O	O	-	-	O	O(1)	5(1)	28(3)
Daishiro Yoshimura	21(4)	O	O	O	O	O(1)	O	O(1)	7(2)	28(6)
Nobuo Kawakami	18(0)	-	-	O	O	O	O	O	5(0)	23(0)
Nobuo Fujishima	11(0)	O	O	O	-	O	O	O	6(0)	17(0)
Kuniya Daini	10(0)	O	O	O	O	O	O	O	7(0)	17(0)
Yoshikazu Nagai	9(1)	-	O	O(1)	O	O	-	-	4(1)	13(2)
Atsuyoshi Furuta	8(0)	O	O	-	O	O	O	-	5(0)	13(0)
Mitsunori Fujiguchi	7(0)	O	-	-	-	-	-	-	1(0)	8(0)
Shusaku Hirasawa	6(1)	O	O	O	O	-	-	O	5(0)	11(1)
Tatsuhiko Seta	2(0)	O	O	-	-	-	O	-	3(0)	5(0)
Mitsuo Watanabe	0(0)	O	O	O	O(1)	O	O	O	7(1)	7(1)
Toshio Takabayashi	0(0)	O(1)	O	-	O	O	-	-	4(1)	4(1)
Shigemi Ishii	0(0)	O	-	-	O	O	O	-	4(0)	4(0)
Hiroyuki Usui	0(0)	O	O	-	-	-	-	-	2(0)	2(0)
Hiroshi Ochiai	0(0)	-	-	-	-	-	O	O	2(0)	2(0)
Kazuhisa Kono	0(0)	-	O	-	-	-	-	-	1(0)	1(0)
Masaki Yokotani	0(0)	-	-	O	-	-	-	-	1(0)	1(0)
Keizo Imai	0(0)	-	-	-	O	-	-	-	1(0)	1(0)
Eijun Kiyokumo	0(0)	-	-	-	-	-	-	O	1(0)	1(0)

== Births ==
- 15 July: Takashi Hirano
