= 1955 in Japanese football =

1955 season

Japanese football in 1955.

== Emperor's Cup ==
May 4, 1955

All Kwangaku	4–3	Chudai Club
? ?' ? ?' ? ?' ? ?'		? ?' ? ?' ? ?'

Nishinomiya Stadium

== National team ==
=== Results ===
1955.01.02	Japan	1–1	Burma	Rangoon, Burma
	Kimura 67'	JFA	? ?'

1955.01.05	Japan	0–3	Burma	Rangoon, Burma
		JFA	? ?' ? ?' ? ?'

1955.01.08	Japan	1–1	Burma	Rangoon, Burma
	Uchino 53'	JFA	? ?'

1955.01.11	Japan	1–0	Burma	Rangoon, Burma
	Iwabuchi 58'	JFA

1955.10.09	Japan	0–0	Burma	Tokyo, Japan
		JFA		Stadium: Korakuen Velodrome

=== Players statistics ===
Player	-1954	01.02	01.05	01.08	01.11	10.09	1955	Total
Masanori Tokita	6(2)	-	-	-	-	O	1(0)	7(2)
Toshio Iwatani	5(4)	-	O	-	-	O	2(0)	7(4)
Takashi Takabayashi	3(2)	O	O	O	O	O	5(0)	8(2)
Ryuzo Hiraki	3(0)	O	-	O	O	O	4(0)	7(0)
Nobuo Matsunaga	3(0)	-	-	-	-	O	1(0)	4(0)
Arawa Kimura	2(0)	O(1)	-	O	O	O	4(1)	6(1)
Tomohiko Ikoma	0(0)	O	O	O	O	O	5(0)	5(0)
Yasuo Kageyama	0(0)	O	O	O	O	O	5(0)	5(0)
Hiroaki Sato	0(0)	O	O	O	O	O	5(0)	5(0)
Hisataka Okamoto	0(0)	O	O	O	O	O	5(0)	5(0)
Masao Uchino	0(0)	O	-	O(1)	O	O	4(1)	4(1)
Kakuichi Mimura	0(0)	O	O	O	O	-	4(0)	4(0)
Yasukazu Tanaka	0(0)	O	O	O	O	-	4(0)	4(0)
Isao Iwabuchi	0(0)	-	O	O	O(1)	-	3(1)	3(1)
Shunichiro Okano	0(0)	O	-	-	O	-	2(0)	2(0)
Reizo Fukuhara	0(0)	-	O	-	-	O	2(0)	2(0)
Yozo Aoki	0(0)	-	O	-	-	-	1(0)	1(0)
Takashi Tokuhiro	0(0)	-	-	-	-	O	1(0)	1(0)
Yukio Shimomura	0(0)	-	-	-	-	O	1(0)	1(0)

== Births ==
- February 14 - Mitsuhisa Taguchi
- April 5 - Takayoshi Yamano
- April 7 - Akira Nishino
- April 8 - Kazuyoshi Nakamura
- April 27 - Katsuyuki Kawachi
- November 2 - Koji Tanaka
- November 20 - Toshio Matsuura
