= 1939 in Japanese football =

1939 season

Japanese football in 1939.

== Emperor's Cup ==
June 11, 1939

Keio BRB	3–2	Waseda University
? ?'; Hirokazu Ninomiya ?' ? ?'		? ?' ? ?'

Meiji Jingu Gaien Stadium

== Births ==
- March 13 - Yoshinobu Ishii
- July 16 - Ryozo Suzuki
- September 12 - Nobuyuki Oishi
