= 1953 in Japanese football =

1953 season

Japanese football in 1953.

== Emperor's Cup ==
May 5, 1953

All Kwangaku	5–4	Osaka Club
? ?' ? ?' ? ?' ? ?' ? ?'		? ?' ? ?' ? ?' ? ?'

Nishikyogoku Athletic Stadium

== Births ==
- January 22 - Mitsuo Kato
- June 4 - Mitsuo Watanabe
- August 4 - Hiroyuki Usui
- September 18 - Toyohito Mochizuki
- November 15 - Toshio Takabayashi
