= 1936 in Japanese football =

1936 season

Japanese football in 1936.

== Emperor's Cup ==
June 21, 1936

Keio BRB	3–2	Bosung College
? ?' ? ?' ? ?'		? ?' ? ?'

Imperial Japanese Army Toyama School Ground

== National team ==
=== Results ===
1936.08.04	Japan	3–2	Sweden	Berlin, Germany
	Kawamoto 49'; Ukon 62'; Matsunaga 85'	JFA	? ?' ? ?'

1936.08.07	Japan	0–8	Italy	Berlin, Germany
		JFA	? ?' ? ?' ? ?' ? ?' ? ?' ? ?' ? ?' ? ?'

=== Players statistics ===
Player	-1935	08.04	08.07	1936	Total
Taizo Kawamoto	3(2)	O(1)	O	2(1)	5(3)
Tokutaro Ukon	2(0)	O(1)	O	2(1)	4(1)
Teizo Takeuchi	2(0)	O	O	2(0)	4(0)
Motoo Tatsuhara	2(0)	O	O	2(0)	4(0)
Tadao Horie	2(0)	O	-	1(0)	3(0)
Yasuo Suzuki	1(0)	-	O	1(0)	2(0)
Akira Matsunaga	0(0)	O(1)	O	2(1)	2(1)
Rihei Sano	0(0)	O	O	2(0)	2(0)
Koichi Oita	0(0)	O	O	2(0)	2(0)
Kim Yong-sik	0(0)	O	O	2(0)	2(0)
Takeshi Kamo	0(0)	O	O	2(0)	2(0)
Shogo Kamo	0(0)	O	O	2(0)	2(0)

== Births ==
- January 11 - Masashi Watanabe
- January 30 - Koji Sasaki
- May 26 - Hiroshi Saeki
- December 3 - Saburo Kawabuchi
