= 1937 in Japanese football =

1937 season

Japanese football in 1937.

== Emperor's Cup ==
June 13, 1937

Keio University	3–0	Kobe University of Commerce
? ?'; Hirokazu Ninomiya ?', ?'

Meiji Jingu Gaien Stadium

== Births ==
- February 13 - Hiroshi Ninomiya
- March 3 - Tsukasa Hosaka
- December 16 - Mitsuo Kamata

== Deaths ==
- August 7 - Takeo Wakabayashi (aged 29)
