= 1938 in Japanese football =

1938 season

Japanese football in 1938.

== Emperor's Cup ==
June 19, 1938

Waseda University	4–1	Keio University
? ?' ? ?' ? ?' ? ?'		? ?'

Meiji Jingu Gaien Stadium

== Births ==
- April 7 - Masakatsu Miyamoto
- October 9 - Takehiko Kawanishi
- October 20 - Tatsuya Shiji
- November 6 - Seishiro Shimatani
