= 1949 in Japanese football =

1949 season

Japanese football in 1949.

== Emperor's Cup ==
June 5, 1949

University of Tokyo LB	5–2	Kandai Club
? ?' ? ?' ? ?' ? ?' ? ?'		? ?' ? ?'

Waseda University Higashi-Fusimi Ground

== Births ==
- March 5 - Shusaku Hirasawa
- April 27 - Hiroji Imamura
- August 17 - Mitsunori Fujiguchi
- November 10 - Michio Yasuda
