= 1982 in Japanese football =

1982 season

Japanese football in 1982

== Japan Soccer League ==
=== Division 1 ===
| Pos | Team | Pld | W | D | L | GF | GA | GD | Pts | Qualification or relegation |
|---|---|---|---|---|---|---|---|---|---|---|
| 1 | Mitsubishi Motors | 18 | 10 | 3 | 5 | 27 | 16 | +11 | 23 | Champions |
| 2 | Yanmar Diesel | 18 | 9 | 4 | 5 | 25 | 17 | +8 | 22 | |
| 3 | Furukawa Electric | 18 | 8 | 5 | 5 | 25 | 19 | +6 | 21 | |
| 4 | Fujita Engineering | 18 | 8 | 4 | 6 | 26 | 21 | +5 | 20 | |
| 5 | Yomiuri | 18 | 8 | 3 | 7 | 23 | 18 | +5 | 19 | |
| 6 | Hitachi | 18 | 8 | 3 | 7 | 29 | 27 | +2 | 19 | |
| 7 | Mazda | 18 | 4 | 9 | 5 | 16 | 20 | −4 | 17 | |
| 8 | Nissan | 18 | 5 | 4 | 9 | 12 | 24 | −12 | 14 | |
| 9 | Honda | 18 | 4 | 6 | 8 | 17 | 29 | −12 | 14 | To promotion/relegation series |
| 10 | Nippon Kokan | 18 | 1 | 9 | 8 | 12 | 23 | −11 | 11 | Relegated to Second Division |

=== Division 2 ===
| Pos | Team | Pld | W | D | L | GF | GA | GD | Pts | Promotion or relegation |
|---|---|---|---|---|---|---|---|---|---|---|
| 1 | Yamaha Motors | 18 | 12 | 5 | 1 | 35 | 11 | +24 | 29 | Promoted to First Division |
| 2 | Toshiba | 18 | 12 | 2 | 4 | 39 | 16 | +23 | 26 | To promotion/relegation series with First Division |
| 3 | Sumitomo | 18 | 11 | 3 | 4 | 32 | 18 | +14 | 25 | |
| 4 | Tanabe Pharmaceuticals | 18 | 10 | 2 | 6 | 27 | 16 | +11 | 22 | |
| 5 | Nippon Steel | 18 | 8 | 3 | 7 | 24 | 21 | +3 | 19 | |
| 6 | Toyota Motors | 18 | 6 | 2 | 10 | 19 | 26 | −7 | 14 | |
| 7 | Fujitsu | 18 | 4 | 5 | 9 | 16 | 26 | −10 | 13 | |
| 8 | Kofu Club | 18 | 4 | 4 | 10 | 15 | 23 | −8 | 12 | |
| 9 | Saitama Teachers | 18 | 4 | 3 | 11 | 14 | 38 | −24 | 11 | To promotion/relegation series with Regional Series |
| 10 | Teijin SC | 18 | 3 | 3 | 12 | 17 | 43 | −26 | 9 | Relegated to Regional Leagues |

== Emperor's Cup ==
January 1, 1983

| Yamaha Motors | 1–0 | Fujita Industries |
|---|---|---|
| ? (?) |

National Stadium

== National team ==
=== Results ===
| 1982.03.21 | Japan | 0–3 | South Korea | Seoul, South Korea |
| | | JFA | ? (?) ? (?) ? (?) |

| 1982.06.02 | Japan | 2–0 | Singapore | Hiroshima, Japan |
| | Totsuka 59'; Ozaki 78' | JFA | | Stadium: Hiroshima Stadium |

| 1982.07.15 | Japan | 0–4 | Romania | Suceava, Romania |
| | | JFA | ? (?) ? (?) ? (?) ? (?) |

| 1982.07.18 | Japan | 1–3 | Romania | București, Romania |
| | Totsuka 12' | JFA | ? (?) ? (?) ? (?) |

| 1982.11.21 | Japan | 1–0 | Iran | New Delhi, India |
| | Kimura 79' | JFA |

| 1982.11.23 | Japan | 3–1 | South Yemen | New Delhi, India |
| | Hara 66', 79'; Totsuka 84' | JFA | ? (?) |

| 1982.11.25 | Japan | 2–1 | South Korea | New Delhi, India |
| | Hara 58'; Okada 80' | JFA | ? (?) |

| 1982.11.28 | Japan | 0–1 (a.e.t.) | Iraq | New Delhi, India |
| | | JFA | ? (?) |

=== Players statistics ===
| Player | -1981 | 03.21 | 06.02 | 07.15 | 07.18 | 11.21 | 11.23 | 11.25 | 11.28 | 1982 | Total |
| Hideki Maeda | 52(9) | O | - | O | O | - | - | - | - | 3(0) | 55(9) |
| Mitsuhisa Taguchi | 38(0) | O | O | O | O | O | O | O | O | 8(0) | 46(0) |
| Nobutoshi Kaneda | 36(3) | O | O | O | O | O | O | O | O | 8(0) | 44(3) |
| Hiromi Hara | 23(4) | O | O | - | - | O | O(2) | O(1) | O | 6(3) | 29(7) |
| Masafumi Yokoyama | 22(8) | - | - | O | - | - | - | - | - | 1(0) | 23(8) |
| Hisashi Kato | 16(2) | O | O | O | O | O | O | O | O | 8(0) | 24(2) |
| Akihiro Nishimura | 14(0) | - | O | O | - | - | - | - | - | 2(0) | 16(0) |
| Kazushi Kimura | 13(4) | O | O | O | O | O(1) | O | O | O | 8(1) | 21(5) |
| Tetsuya Totsuka | 12(0) | - | O(1) | O | O(1) | - | O(1) | - | - | 4(3) | 16(3) |
| Yahiro Kazama | 12(0) | O | - | - | - | O | - | O | O | 4(0) | 16(0) |
| Tetsuo Sugamata | 11(0) | - | O | - | O | O | O | O | O | 6(0) | 17(0) |
| Satoshi Tsunami | 10(0) | O | O | O | O | O | O | O | O | 8(0) | 18(0) |
| Ryoichi Kawakatsu | 10(0) | O | O | - | O | - | - | - | - | 3(0) | 13(0) |
| Kazuo Ozaki | 9(2) | O | O(1) | O | O | O | O | - | O | 7(1) | 16(3) |
| Koichi Hashiratani | 9(0) | O | - | O | - | - | - | - | O | 3(0) | 12(0) |
| Mitsugu Nomura | 8(0) | O | O | O | O | - | - | - | - | 4(0) | 12(0) |
| Takeshi Okada | 8(0) | - | - | - | - | - | - | O(1) | O | 2(1) | 10(1) |
| Hiroshi Yoshida | 6(1) | - | - | - | - | - | O | - | - | 1(0) | 7(1) |
| Toshio Matsuura | 4(1) | O | - | O | - | - | - | - | - | 2(0) | 6(1) |
| Takeshi Koshida | 2(0) | O | - | O | O | O | O | O | O | 7(0) | 9(0) |
| Koji Tanaka | 0(0) | - | - | O | O | O | O | O | O | 6(0) | 6(0) |

== Births ==
- 30 January: Daiki Iwamasa
