= 1933 in Japanese football =

1933 season

Japanese football in 1933.

== Emperor's Cup ==
October 30, 1933

Tokyo OB Club	4–1	Sendai SC
? ?' ? ?' ? ?' ? ?'		? ?'

Meiji Jingu Gaien Stadium

== Births ==
- January 1 - Waichiro Omura
- March 24 - Shigeo Yaegashi
- June 15 - Yasukazu Tanaka
- November 17 - Isao Iwabuchi
- December 14 - Hisataka Okamoto
