= Toyohito Mochizuki =

Japanese footballer

Toyohito Mochizuki 望月 豊仁
Personal information
- Full name: Toyohito Mochizuki
- Date of birth: September 18, 1953 (age 73)
- Place of birth: Shizuoka, Shizuoka, Japan
- Height: 1.78 m (5 ft 10 in)
- Position: Defender

Youth career
- Shimizu Commercial High School
- Tokyo University of Agriculture

Senior career*
Years	Team	Apps	(Gls)
- Fujitsu

International career
1978	Japan	2	(0)
- * Club domestic league appearances and goals

Toyohito Mochizuki (望月 豊仁, Mochizuki Toyohito; born September 18, 1953) is a former Japanese football player. He played for Japan national team.

== Club career ==
Mochizuki was born in Shizuoka on September 18, 1953. After graduating from Tokyo University of Agriculture, he joined Japan Soccer League Division 2 club Fujitsu. The club won Division 2 champions in 1976 and was promoted to Division 1.

== National team career ==
On July 21, 1978, Mochizuki debuted for Japan national team against Malaysia. On July 23, he also played against Singapore. He played 2 games for Japan in 1978.

== National team statistics ==
Japan national team
Year	Apps	Goals
1978	2	0
Total	2	0
