= Michio Yasuda =

Japanese footballer

Michio Yasuda 保田 道夫
Personal information
- Full name: Michio Yasuda
- Date of birth: November 10, 1949 (age 76)
- Place of birth: Japan
- Height: 1.81 m (5 ft 11 1/2 in)
- Position: Goalkeeper

Youth career
- 1965–1967: Nakatsu Minami High School
- 1968–1971: Fukuoka University

Senior career*
Years	Team	Apps	(Gls)
1972–1980	Nippon Steel	155	(0)
Total		155	(0)

International career
1979	Japan	1	(0)
- * Club domestic league appearances and goals

Michio Yasuda (保田 道夫, Yasuda Michio; born November 10, 1949) is a former Japanese football player. He played for Japan national team.

== Club career ==
Yasuda was born on November 10, 1949. After graduating from Fukuoka University, he joined Japan Soccer League club Nippon Steel in 1972. He retired in 1980. He played 155 games in the league.

== National team career ==
On August 23, 1979, Yasuda debuted for Japan national team against North Korea.

== National team statistics ==
Japan national team
Year	Apps	Goals
1979	1	0
Total	1	0
