= 1957 in Japanese football =

1957 season

This is a list of events in Japanese football in 1957.

== Emperor's Cup ==
May 6, 1957

Chudai Club	2–1	Toyo Industries

Hiroshima Kokutaiji High School Stadium

== Births ==
- February 9 - Ruy Ramos
- April 14 - Haruhisa Hasegawa
- April 14 - Masaru Uchiyama
- August 1 - Yoshio Kato
- October 14 - Ikuo Takahara
- November 4 - Yoshinori Ishigami
- November 21 - Kozo Tashima
- November 28 - Yasutaro Matsuki
- November 29 - Tetsuo Sugamata
