= 1952 in Japanese football =

1952 season

Japanese football in 1952.

== Emperor's Cup ==
May 6, 1952

All Keio	6–2	Osaka Club
? ?' ? ?' ? ?' ? ?' ? ?' ? ?'		? ?' ? ?'

Fujieda Higashi High School Ground

== Births ==
- January 15 - Tatsuhiko Seta
- March 12 - Yasuhiko Okudera
- April 16 - Yoshikazu Nagai
- May 10 - Masaki Yokotani
- October 27 - Atsuyoshi Furuta
- December 15 - Yukitaka Omi
