= 1921 in Japanese football =

1921 season

Japanese football in 1921.

== Emperor's Cup ==
November 27, 1921

Tokyo Shukyu-Dan	1–0	Mikage Shukyu-Dan
? ?'

Hibiya Park Ground

== Births ==
- December 6 - Nobuo Matsunaga
