= 1929 in Japanese football =

1929 season

Japanese football in 1929.

== Emperor's Cup ==
November 1, 1929

Kwangaku Club	3–0	Hosei University
? ?' ? ?' ? ?'

Meiji Jingu Gaien Stadium

== Births ==
- April 10 - Yozo Aoki
- August 31 - Osamu Yamaji
