= Yoshinobu Ishii =

Japanese footballer and manager (1939–2018)

Yoshinobu Ishii 石井 義信
Personal information
- Full name: Yoshinobu Ishii
- Date of birth: March 13, 1939
- Place of birth: Fukuyama, Hiroshima, Empire of Japan
- Date of death: April 26, 2018 (aged 79)
- Place of death: Japan
- Position: Midfielder

Youth career
- 1954–1956: Fukuyama Iyo High School

Senior career*
Years	Team	Apps	(Gls)
1957–1967	Toyo Industries	28	(0)
1968–1975	Fujita Industries		
Total		28+	(0+)

International career
1962	Japan	1	(0)

Managerial career
- 1975–1980: Fujita Industries
- 1986–1987: Japan
- 1988–1990: Fujita Industries
Medal record
Toyo Industries
Winner	Japan Soccer League	1965
Winner	Japan Soccer League	1966
Winner	Japan Soccer League	1967
Winner	Emperor's Cup	1965
Winner	Emperor's Cup	1967
Runner-up	Emperor's Cup	1957
Runner-up	Emperor's Cup	1966
Fujita Industries
Runner-up	Emperor's Cup	1975
- * Club domestic league appearances and goals

Yoshinobu Ishii (石井 義信, Ishii Yoshinobu; March 13, 1939 – April 26, 2018) was a Japanese football player and manager. He played for Japan national team. He also managed Japan national team.

== Club career ==
Ishii was born in Fukuyama on March 13, 1939. After graduating from high school, he joined his local club Toyo Industries in 1957. In 1965, Toyo Industries joined new league Japan Soccer League. The club won the league champions for 3 years in a row (1965-1967) and Emperor's Cup 2 times (1965 and 1967 Emperor's Cup). He played 28 games in the league. In 1968, he moved to new club Towa Real Estate (later Fujita Industries). The club was promoted to Japan Soccer League in 1972. He retired in 1975.

== National team career ==
On August 15, 1962, Ishii debuted for Japan national team against Singapore.

== Coaching career ==
In 1975, when Ishii played for Fujita Industries, he became a playing manager as Yukio Shimomura successor. The club won the champions in 1977 and 1979. The club also won 1979 Emperor's Cup. He left the club in 1980. In 1986, he named a manager for Japan national team as Takaji Mori successor. He managed at 1986 Asian Games. However, at 1988 Summer Olympics qualification in October 1987, following Japan's failure to qualify for 1988 Summer Olympics, he resigned as manager. In 1988, he returned to Fujita Industries and managed the club. However, in 1989–90 season, the club was relegated to Division 2 and he resigned as manager.

Ishii died on April 26, 2018, at the age of 79.

== Club statistics ==
Club performance			League	
Season	Club	League	Apps	Goals
Japan			League	
1965	Toyo Industries	JSL Division 1	13	0
1966	Toyo Industries	JSL Division 1	10	0
1967	Toyo Industries	JSL Division 1	5	0
Total			28	0

== National team statistics ==
Japan national team
Year	Apps	Goals
1962	1	0
Total	1	0
