= 1924 in Japanese football =

1924 season

Japanese football in 1924.

== Emperor's Cup ==
October 31, 1924

Rijo Shukyu-Dan	4–1	All Mikage Shihan Club
? ?' ? ?' ? ?' ? ?'		? ?'

Meiji Jingu Gaien Stadium

== Births ==
- September 24 - Hidemaro Watanabe
