= Hiroshi Yoshida (footballer) =

Japanese footballer and manager

Hiroshi Yoshida 吉田 弘
Personal information
- Full name: Hiroshi Yoshida
- Date of birth: February 11, 1958 (age 68)
- Place of birth: Shizuoka, Japan
- Height: 1.74 m (5 ft 8 1/2 in)
- Position: Forward

Youth career
- 1973–1975: Shizuoka Kogyo High School

College career
Years	Team	Apps	(Gls)
1976–1979	Hosei University		

Senior career*
Years	Team	Apps	(Gls)
1980–1990	Furukawa Electric	180	(60)
Total		180	(60)

International career
1981–1983	Japan	9	(1)

Managerial career
- 2007–2012: Japan Women U-17
- 2011–2014: Japan Women U-20
- 2015: AS Elfen Saitama
Medal record
Furukawa Electric
Winner	Japan Soccer League	1985/86
Winner	JSL Cup	1982
Winner	JSL Cup	1986
Runner-up	Emperor's Cup	1984
- * Club domestic league appearances and goals

Hiroshi Yoshida (吉田 弘, Yoshida Hiroshi; born February 11, 1958) is a former Japanese football player and manager. He played for Japan national team.

== Club career ==
Yoshida was born in Shizuoka Prefecture on February 11, 1958. After graduating from Hosei University, he joined Furukawa Electric in 1980. In 1981, he scored 14 goals and became a top scorer. In 1985–86, he became a top scorer again and he was selected Japanese Footballer of the Year awards. The club also won the league champions. In Asia, the club won 1986 Asian Club Championship. This is the first Asian champions as Japanese club. He retired in 1990.

== National team career ==
On February 8, 1981, Yoshida debuted for Japan national team against Malaysia. He also played at 1982 Asian Games. He played 9 games and scored 1 goal for Japan until 1983.

== Coaching career ==
After retirement, Yoshida started coaching career at Shimizu S-Pulse. From 2000s, he mainly coached women's team. Through Japan women's national team coach, he became a manager for Japan U-17 women's national team in 2007. He managed at U-17 World Cup 3 times (2008, 2010 and 2012). At 2010 U-17 World Cup, Japan won the 2nd place. He also became a manager Japan U-20 women's national team in 2011. He managed at 2012 U-20 World Cup and Japan won the 3rd place. In 2014, he signed with AS Elfen Saitama and managed in 2015 season.

== Club statistics ==
Club performance			League		Cup		League Cup		Total	
Season	Club	League	Apps	Goals	Apps	Goals	Apps	Goals	Apps	Goals
Japan			League		Emperor's Cup		JSL Cup		Total	
1980	Furukawa Electric	JSL Division 1	13	2						
1981	Furukawa Electric	JSL Division 1	18	14						
1982	Furukawa Electric	JSL Division 1	18	7						
1983	Furukawa Electric	JSL Division 1	17	1						
1984	Furukawa Electric	JSL Division 1	14	3						
1985/86	Furukawa Electric	JSL Division 1	22	16						
1986/87	Furukawa Electric	JSL Division 1	20	11						
1987/88	Furukawa Electric	JSL Division 1	17	3						
1988/89	Furukawa Electric	JSL Division 1	22	2						
1989/90	Furukawa Electric	JSL Division 1	19	1			2	0	21	1
Total			180	60	0	0	2	0	182	60

== National team statistics ==
Japan national team
Year	Apps	Goals
1981	6	1
1982	1	0
1983	2	0
Total	9	1

== Honors ==
=== Personal honors ===
- Japan Soccer League First Division Top Scorer – 1981, 1985–86
- Japanese Footballer of the Year – 1985

=== Managers honors ===
- AFC U-16 Women's Championship – 2011
- AFC U-19 Women's Championship – 2011
