= Hisataka Okamoto =

Japanese footballer

Hisataka Okamoto 岡本 久敬
Personal information
- Full name: Hisataka Okamoto
- Date of birth: December 14, 1933 (age 92)
- Place of birth: Empire of Japan
- Position: Forward

Youth career
- Kwansei Gakuin University

Senior career*
Years	Team	Apps	(Gls)
- Hitachi

International career
1955	Japan	5	(0)
Medal record
All Kwangaku
Winner	Emperor's Cup	1953
Winner	Emperor's Cup	1955
- * Club domestic league appearances and goals

Hisataka Okamoto (岡本 久敬, Okamoto Hisataka; born December 14, 1933) is a former Japanese football player. He played for Japan national team.

== Club career ==
Okamoto was born on December 14, 1933. When he was a Kwansei Gakuin University student, he won 1953 and 1955 Emperor's Cup at All Kwangaku was consisted of his alma mater Kwansei Gakuin University players and graduates. After graduating from university, he played for Hitachi.

== National team career ==
On January 2, 1955, when Okamoto was a Kwansei Gakuin University student, he debuted for Japan national team against Burma. He played 5 games for Japan in 1955.

== National team statistics ==
Japan national team
Year	Apps	Goals
1955	5	0
Total	5	0
