= Shozo Tsugitani =

Japanese footballer

Shozo Tsugitani 継谷 昌三
Personal information
- Full name: Shozo Tsugitani
- Date of birth: June 25, 1940
- Place of birth: Hyogo, Empire of Japan
- Date of death: June 2, 1978 (aged 37)
- Place of death: Kobe, Hyogo, Japan
- Height: 1.67 m (5 ft 5 1/2 in)
- Position: Midfielder

Youth career
- 1956–1958: Kwansei Gakuin High School
- 1959–1962: Kwansei Gakuin University

Senior career*
Years	Team	Apps	(Gls)
1963–1967	Mitsubishi Motors	40	(16)
Total		40	(16)

International career
1961–1965	Japan	12	(4)
Medal record
Mitsubishi Motors
Runner-up	Emperor's Cup	1967
Representing Japan
AFC U-19 Championship
Bronze medal – third place	1959 Malaya
- * Club domestic league appearances and goals

Shozo Tsugitani (継谷 昌三, Tsugitani Shōzō; June 25, 1940 – June 2, 1978) was a Japanese football player.

== Club career ==
Tsugitani was born in Hyogo Prefecture on June 25, 1940. After graduating from Kwansei Gakuin University, he joined Mitsubishi Motors in 1963. In 1965, Mitsubishi Motors joined new league Japan Soccer League. He retired in 1967. He played 40 games and scored 16 goals in the league.

== National team career ==
On August 15, 1961, when he was a Kwansei Gakuin University student, he debuted for Japan national team against Indonesia. He played at 1962 Asian Games. In 1964, he was selected Japan for 1964 Summer Olympics in Tokyo, but he did not compete. He played 12 games and scored 4 goals for Japan until 1965.

On June 2, 1978, Tsugitani died of cirrhosis in Kobe at the age of 37.

== National team statistics ==
Japan national team
Year	Apps	Goals
1961	2	0
1962	2	0
1963	5	4
1964	1	0
1965	2	0
Total	12	4
