= Nagoya WEST FC =

Japanese football club

Nagoya WEST F.C.
- Full name: Nagoya WEST Football Club
- Founded: ? (as Nagoya Mutual Bank SC)
- Ground: Aichi Prefecture, Japan
- League: Prefectural Leagues

Nagoya WEST Football Club is a Japanese football club based in Aichi Prefecture. The club has played in Japan Soccer League (Japanese former top division). Currently plays in Japanese Prefectural Leagues.

== History ==
The club originally belonged to Nagoya Mutual Bank (now the Bank of Nagoya). It was one of the founders of the Japan Soccer League (JSL) in 1965 ("Original Eight" (Note: The Original Eight of the Japan Soccer League (JSL) in 1965 were Mitsubishi, Furukawa, Hitachi, Yanmar, Toyo Industries, Yahata Steel, Toyota Industries and Nagoya Mutual Bank.)) but lasted only two seasons before being relegated after losing a playoff to NKK S.C. After one season in the Tōkai Regional League, the club regained their place in the JSL by defeating near-neighbor Toyota Automated Loom Works. They lasted until 1972, when they lost another playoff to Towa Real Estate. After that season they were supposed to join the newly formed JSL Second Division, but Nagoya Mutual Bank chose to close down the club; NTT Kinki from the Kansai region replaced them. Most of the team's players joined a new team under Yamaguchi Prefecture-based Eidai Industries and played in the JSL from 1973 to 1976 (being promoted at the first time of asking in 1973), but that club folded in 1976 as well.

In 1989, the Bank of Nagoya reformed the club as an amateur outfit competing in the Aichi Prefectural League. In 2002 they became independent from the bank, adopting the name Nagoya WEST FC. They have been regularly promoted and relegated between the Aichi and Tōkai leagues.

=== League record (original club) ===
| Season | League | Pos | PTS | Pld | W | D | L | GF | GA | GD |
|---|---|---|---|---|---|---|---|---|---|---|
| 1965 | JSL | 8th | 4 | 14 | 1 | 2 | 11 | 16 | 43 | −27 |
| 1966 | JSL | 7th | 4 | 14 | 2 | 0 | 12 | 12 | 34 | −22 |
| 1967 | Tōkai | 1st | 12 | 7 | 5 | 2 | 0 | 26 | 7 | 19 |
| 1968 | JSL | 6th | 9 | 14 | 3 | 3 | 8 | 17 | 25 | −8 |
| 1969 | JSL | 8th | 4 | 14 | 2 | 0 | 12 | 12 | 31 | −19 |
| 1970 | JSL | 8th | 5 | 14 | 1 | 3 | 10 | 9 | 34 | −25 |
| 1971 | JSL | 8th | 3 | 14 | 0 | 3 | 11 | 10 | 43 | −33 |

== Club name ==
- ?-1971 : Nagoya Mutual Bank SC
- 1989–2001 : Nagoya Bank SC
- 2002–present : Nagoya WEST FC
