= Hiroshi Ninomiya =

Japanese footballer and manager

Hiroshi Ninomiya 二宮 寛
Personal information
- Full name: Hiroshi Ninomiya
- Date of birth: February 13, 1937 (age 89)
- Place of birth: Tokyo, Empire of Japan
- Position: Forward

Youth career
- 1952–1954: Keio High School

College career
Years	Team	Apps	(Gls)
1955–1958	Keio University		

Senior career*
Years	Team	Apps	(Gls)
1959–1968	Mitsubishi Motors	45	(8)
Total		45	(8)

International career
1958–1961	Japan	12	(9)

Managerial career
- 1967–1975: Mitsubishi Motors
- 1976–1978: Japan
Medal record
Mitsubishi Motors
Runner-up	Emperor's Cup	1967
Runner-up	Emperor's Cup	1968
- * Club domestic league appearances and goals

Hiroshi Ninomiya (二宮 寛, Ninomiya Hiroshi; born February 13, 1937) is a former Japanese football player and manager. He played for Japan national team. He also managed the Japan national team.

== Club career ==
Ninomiya was born in Tokyo on February 13, 1937. After graduating from Keio University, he joined Mitsubishi Motors in 1959. In 1965, Mitsubishi Motors joined new league Japan Soccer League. He retired in 1968. He played 45 games and scored 8 goals in the league.

== National team career ==
On December 25, 1958, when Ninomiya was a Keio University student, he debuted for Japan national team against Hong Kong. In 1959, he played 9 games and scored 9 goals as a regular player. He played 12 games and scored 9 goals for Japan until 1961.

== Coaching career ==
In 1967, Ninomiya played for Mitsubishi Motors, he became a playing manager as Tomohiko Ikoma successor and managed until 1975. In 9 seasons, the club won the champions 2 times (1969 and 1973) and 2nd place 4 times. The club also 1971 and 1973 Emperor's Cup. After Japan national team failed to qualify for 1976 Summer Olympics in April 1976, Ninomiya became a manager for Japan national team as Ken Naganuma's successor. Ninomiya managed at 1978 World Cup qualification and 1978 Asian Games. He resigned after 1978 Asian Games.

In 2015, Ninomiya was selected Japan Football Hall of Fame.

== National team statistics ==
Japan national team
Year	Apps	Goals
1958	2	0
1959	9	9
1960	0	0
1961	1	0
Total	12	9

== Honours ==
- Japan Football Hall of Fame: Inducted in 2015
