= Takeo Takahashi (footballer) =

Japanese footballer and manager

Takeo Takahashi 高橋 武夫
Personal information
- Full name: Takeo Takahashi
- Date of birth: May 13, 1947 (age 79)
- Place of birth: Shinagawa, Tokyo, Japan
- Height: 1.74 m (5 ft 8 1/2 in)
- Position: Forward

Youth career
- 1963–1965: Kawaguchi High School
- 1974–1978: Tokyo University of Agriculture

Senior career*
Years	Team	Apps	(Gls)
1966–1973	Furukawa Electric	93	(47)
1979–1982	Toshiba		
Total		93	(47)

International career
1966–1970	Japan	14	(4)

Managerial career
- 1987–1996: Consadole Sapporo
Medal record
Furukawa Electric
Runner-up	Japan Soccer League	1967
Toshiba
Winner	JSL Cup	1981
Representing Japan
Asian Games
Bronze medal – third place	1966 Bangkok	Team
- * Club domestic league appearances and goals

Takeo Takahashi (高橋 武夫, Takahashi Takeo; born May 13, 1947) (former name; Takeo Kimura, 木村 武夫) is a former Japanese football player and manager. He played for Japan national team.

== Club career ==
Takahashi was born in Shinagawa, Tokyo on May 13, 1947. After graduating from high school, he joined Furukawa Electric in 1966. In 1967 season, he scored 15 goals and became a top scorer. He was 20 years old, this is the youngest top scorer in Japan Soccer League. He left the club in 1973 and entered Tokyo University of Agriculture. After graduating from Tokyo University of Agriculture, he joined Division 2 club Toshiba in 1979. In 1979, the club won the champions in Division 2. He retired in 1982.

== National team career ==
In December 1966, Takahashi was selected Japan national team for 1966 Asian Games. At this competition, on December 17, he debuted against Thailand. He also played at 1970 Asian Games. This competition was his last game for Japan. He played 14 games and scored 4 goals for Japan until 1970.

== Coaching career ==
After retirement, Takahashi became a manager for Toshiba (later Consadole Sapporo) in 1987. In 1989, he led the club to won the champions in Division 2 and promoted to Division 1. He managed the club until 1996.

== Club statistics ==
Club performance			League	
Season	Club	League	Apps	Goals
Japan			League	
1966	Furukawa Electric	JSL Division 1	10	6
1967	Furukawa Electric	JSL Division 1	13	15
1968	Furukawa Electric	JSL Division 1	12	6
1969	Furukawa Electric	JSL Division 1	14	6
1970	Furukawa Electric	JSL Division 1	13	6
1971	Furukawa Electric	JSL Division 1	14	3
1972	Furukawa Electric	JSL Division 1	8	3
1973	Furukawa Electric	JSL Division 1	9	2
Total			93	47

== National team statistics ==
Japan national team
Year	Apps	Goals
1966	2	1
1967	1	0
1968	2	0
1969	1	0
1970	8	3
Total	14	4

== Personal honors ==
- Japan Soccer League Top Scorer: 1967
- Japan Soccer League Best Eleven: 1967
- Japan Soccer League Fighting Spirit Award: 1967
