= Takehiko Kawanishi =

Japanese footballer

Takehiko Kawanishi 川西 武彦
Personal information
- Full name: Takehiko Kawanishi
- Date of birth: October 9, 1938 (age 88)
- Place of birth: Hiroshima, Empire of Japan
- Height: 1.73 m (5 ft 8 in)
- Position: Midfielder

Youth career
- 1954–1956: Hiroshima Kokutaiji High School
- 1957–1960: Rikkyo University

Senior career*
Years	Team	Apps	(Gls)
1961–1966	Toyo Industries	0	(0)
Total		0	(0)

International career
1959–1962	Japan	8	(0)
Medal record
Toyo Industries
Winner	Japan Soccer League	1965
Winner	Japan Soccer League	1966
Winner	Emperor's Cup	1965
Runner-up	Emperor's Cup	1966
- * Club domestic league appearances and goals

Takehiko Kawanishi (川西 武彦, Kawanishi Takehiko; born October 9, 1938) is a former Japanese football player. He played for Japan national team.

== Club career ==
Kawanishi was born in Hiroshima Prefecture on October 9, 1938. After graduating from Rikkyo University, he joined his local club Toyo Industries in 1961. In 1965, Toyo Industries joined new league Japan Soccer League. He retired in 1966. He did not play in the league.

== National team career ==
In December 1959, when he was a Rikkyo University student, he was selected Japan national team for 1960 Summer Olympics qualification. At this qualification, on December 20, he debuted against South Korea. He played 8 games for Japan until 1962.

== Club statistics ==
Club performance			League	
Season	Club	League	Apps	Goals
Japan			League	
1965	Toyo Industries	JSL Division 1	0	0
1966	Toyo Industries	JSL Division 1	0	0
Total			0	0

== National team statistics ==
Japan national team
Year	Apps	Goals
1959	1	0
1960	1	0
1961	5	0
1962	1	0
Total	8	0
