= Hisao Kami =

Japanese footballer and manager

Hisao Kami 上 久雄
Personal information
- Full name: Hisao Kami
- Date of birth: June 28, 1941 (age 85)
- Place of birth: Hiroshima, Empire of Japan
- Height: 1.76 m (5 ft 9 1/2 in)
- Position: Defender

Youth career
- 1957–1959: Sanyo High School

Senior career*
Years	Team	Apps	(Gls)
1960–1972	Nippon Steel	85	(5)
Total		85	(5)

International career
1964–1968	Japan	15	(0)

Managerial career
- 1980–1983: Nippon Steel
- 1987–1989: Nippon Steel
Medal record
Nippon Steel
Runner-up	Japan Soccer League	1965
Runner-up	Japan Soccer League	1966
Winner	Emperor's Cup	1964
Runner-up	Emperor's Cup	1965
Representing Japan
Asian Games
Bronze medal – third place	1966 Bangkok	Team
- * Club domestic league appearances and goals

Hisao Kami (上 久雄, Kami Hisao; born June 28, 1941) is a former Japanese football player and manager. He played for Japan national team.

== Club career ==
Kami was born in Hiroshima Prefecture on June 28, 1941. After graduating from high school, he joined Yawata Steel (later Nippon Steel) in 1960. The club won 1964 Emperor's Cup. In 1965, Yawata Steel joined new league Japan Soccer League. He retired in 1970. He played 85 games and scored 5 goals in the league. He was selected Best Eleven in 1966 and 1967.

== National team career ==
In October 1964, Kami was selected Japan national team for 1964 Summer Olympics in Tokyo. At this competition, on October 16, he debuted against Ghana. He also played as regular player at 1966 Asian Games and 1968 Summer Olympics qualification. However, he was not selected Japan for 1968 Summer Olympics. He played 15 games for Japan until 1968.

== Coaching career ==
After retirement, Kami became a manager for Nippon Steel in 1980 as Teruki Miyamoto successor. However, the club was relegated to Division 2 first time. He resigned in 1983. In 1987, he returned to Nippon Steel and managed until 1989.

== National team statistics ==
Japan national team
Year	Apps	Goals
1964	1	0
1965	3	0
1966	5	0
1967	4	0
1968	2	0
Total	15	0

== Awards ==
- Japan Soccer League Best Eleven: (2) 1966, 1967
