= Nobuo Fujishima =

Japanese footballer and manager

Nobuo Fujishima 藤島 信雄
Personal information
- Full name: Nobuo Fujishima
- Date of birth: April 8, 1950 (age 76)
- Place of birth: Akita, Akita, Japan
- Height: 1.68 m (5 ft 6 in)
- Position: Midfielder

Youth career
- 1966–1968: Yuri Kogyo High School

Senior career*
Years	Team	Apps	(Gls)
1969–1986	Nippon Kokan		

International career
1971–1979	Japan	65	(7)

Managerial career
- 1999–2002: YKK
Medal record
Nippon Kokan
Runner-up	Japan Soccer League	1985/86
Winner	JSL Cup	1980
Winner	Emperor's Cup	1981
- * Club domestic league appearances and goals

Nobuo Fujishima (藤島 信雄, Fujishima Nobuo; born April 8, 1950) is a former Japanese football player and manager. He played for the Japan national team.

== Club career ==
Fujishima was born in Akita on April 8, 1950. After graduating from high school, he joined Nippon Kokan in 1969. The club won 1980 JSL Cup and 1981 Emperor's Cup. He retired in 1986. He was selected Best Eleven 4 times (1971, 1976, 1977 and 1978).

== National team career ==
In September 1971, Fujishima was selected for the Japan national team for the 1972 Summer Olympics qualification. At that competition, on September 29, he debuted against Chinese Taipei. He also played in the 1974 and 1978 Asian Games. He also served as captain from 1978. He played 65 games and scored seven goals for Japan until 1979.

== Coaching career ==
After retirement, Fujishima started a coaching career at Nippon Kokan. In 1999, he signed with Japanese Regional Leagues club YKK. He promoted the club to Japan Football League in 2001. He resigned in 2002.

== Club statistics ==
Club performance			League	
Season	Club	League	Apps	Goals
Japan			League	
1969	Nippon Kokan	JSL Division 1	10	1
1970	Nippon Kokan	JSL Division 1	12	1
1971	Nippon Kokan	JSL Division 1	14	0
1972	Nippon Kokan	JSL Division 1	14	1
1973	Nippon Kokan	JSL Division 1	18	5
1974	Nippon Kokan	JSL Division 1	18	2
1975	Nippon Kokan	JSL Division 1	16	3
1976	Nippon Kokan	JSL Division 1	18	6
1977	Nippon Kokan	JSL Division 1	17	5
1978	Nippon Kokan	JSL Division 1	18	2
1979	Nippon Kokan	JSL Division 1	10	1
1980	Nippon Kokan	JSL Division 2		
1981	Nippon Kokan	JSL Division 2		
1982	Nippon Kokan	JSL Division 1	17	2
1983	Nippon Kokan	JSL Division 2		
1984	Nippon Kokan	JSL Division 1	18	1
1985/86	Nippon Kokan	JSL Division 1	0	0
Total			200	30

== National team statistics ==
Japan national team
Year	Apps	Goals
1971	1	0
1972	6	0
1973	4	0
1974	6	0
1975	12	3
1976	16	3
1977	5	0
1978	12	1
1979	3	0
Total	65	7
