= Masao Uchino =

Japanese footballer and manager

Masao Uchino 内野 正雄
Personal information
- Full name: Masao Uchino
- Date of birth: April 21, 1934
- Place of birth: Kanagawa, Empire of Japan
- Height: 1.63 m (5 ft 4 in)
- Position: Forward

Youth career
- Odawara High School
- Chuo University

Senior career*
Years	Team	Apps	(Gls)
????–1969	Furukawa Electric	47	(19)
Total		47	(19)

International career
1955–1962	Japan	18	(3)

Managerial career
- 1966: Furukawa Electric
- 1979–1983: Furukawa Electric
Medal record
Furukawa Electric
Runner-up	Japan Soccer League	1967
Winner	Emperor's Cup	1960
Winner	Emperor's Cup	1961
Winner	Emperor's Cup	1964
Runner-up	Emperor's Cup	1962
- * Club domestic league appearances and goals

Masao Uchino (内野 正雄, Uchino Masao; April 21, 1934 – April 2013) was a Japanese football player and manager. He played for Japan national team.

== Club career ==
Uchino was born in Kanagawa Prefecture on April 21, 1934. After graduating from Chuo University, he joined Furukawa Electric. He won 1960, 1961 and 1964 Emperor's Cup. In 1965, Furukawa Electric joined new league Japan Soccer League. He played 47 games and scored 19 goals in the league. He retired in 1969.

== National team career ==
On January 2, 1955, when Uchino was a Chuo University student, he debuted for Japan national team against Burma. In June 1956, at 1956 Summer Olympics qualification against South Korea, he scored an important first goal. After the qualification, Japan won the qualification to 1956 Summer Olympics in Melbourne by the drawing of lots. In November, he was selected Japan for 1956 Olympics. He also played at 1958 and 1962 Asian Games. He played 18 games and scored 3 goals for Japan until 1962.

== Coaching career ==
In 1966, when Uchino played for Furukawa Electric, he became a playing manager as Ryuzo Hiraki successor and managed the club in 1 season. In 1979, he became a manager for the club as Mitsuo Kamata successor again. The club won 1982 JSL Cup. End of 1983 season, he resigned.

== Club statistics ==
Club performance			League	
Season	Club	League	Apps	Goals
Japan			League	
1965	Furukawa Electric	JSL Division 1		1
1966	Furukawa Electric	JSL Division 1		5
1967	Furukawa Electric	JSL Division 1		7
1968	Furukawa Electric	JSL Division 1		5
1969	Furukawa Electric	JSL Division 1		1
Total			47	19

== National team statistics ==
Japan national team
Year	Apps	Goals
1955	4	1
1956	3	1
1957	0	0
1958	1	0
1959	4	1
1960	1	0
1961	2	0
1962	3	0
Total	18	3
