= Kozo Arai =

Japanese footballer (born 1950)

Kozo Arai 荒井 公三
Personal information
- Full name: Kozo Arai
- Date of birth: October 24, 1950 (age 76)
- Place of birth: Etajima, Hiroshima, Japan
- Height: 1.78 m (5 ft 10 in)
- Position: Midfielder

Youth career
- 1966–1968: Hiroshima Kogyo High School

Senior career*
Years	Team	Apps	(Gls)
1969–1978	Furukawa Electric	124	(17)
Total		124	(17)

International career
1970–1977	Japan	47	(4)
Medal record
Furukawa Electric
Winner	Japan Soccer League	1976
Winner	JSL Cup	1977
Winner	Emperor's Cup	1976
- * Club domestic league appearances and goals

Kozo Arai (荒井 公三, Arai Kōzō; born October 24, 1950) is a former Japanese footballer. He played for Japan national team.

== Club career ==
Arai was born in Etajima on October 24, 1950. After graduating from high school, he joined Furukawa Electric in 1969. In 1976, the club won Japan Soccer League and Emperor's Cup. The club also won 1977 JSL Cup. He retired in 1978. He played 124 games and scored 17 goals in the league. He was selected Best Eleven 4 times (1971, 1973, 1974 and 1976).

== National team career ==
In December 1970, Arai was selected Japan national team for 1970 Asian Games. At this competition, on December 10, he debuted against Malaysia. He also played at 1974 Asian Games, 1972 Summer Olympics qualification, 1974 World Cup qualification and 1976 Summer Olympics qualification. He played 47 games and scored 4 goals for Japan until 1977.

== Club statistics ==
Appearances and goals by club, season and competition
Club	Season	League		
Club	Season	Division	Apps	Goals
Furukawa Electric	1969	JSL Division 1	6	0
Furukawa Electric	1970	JSL Division 1	14	0
Furukawa Electric	1971	JSL Division 1	13	3
Furukawa Electric	1972	JSL Division 1	12	6
Furukawa Electric	1973	JSL Division 1	17	2
Furukawa Electric	1974	JSL Division 1	18	2
Furukawa Electric	1975	JSL Division 1	18	2
Furukawa Electric	1976	JSL Division 1	18	1
Furukawa Electric	1977	JSL Division 1	8	1
Furukawa Electric	1978	JSL Division 1	0	0
Career total			124	17

== National team statistics ==
Japan national team
Year	Apps	Goals
1970	6	0
1971	4	0
1972	8	2
1973	5	0
1974	5	1
1975	3	1
1976	15	0
1977	1	0
Total	47	4

== Awards ==
- Japan Soccer League Best Eleven: 1971, 1973, 1974, 1976
- Japan Soccer League Fighting Spirit: 1971
