= Koji Sasaki =

Japanese footballer

Koji Sasaki 佐々木 康治
Personal information
- Full name: Koji Sasaki
- Date of birth: January 30, 1936 (age 90)
- Place of birth: Japan
- Position: Forward

Youth career
- 1951–1953: Meisei High School
- 1954–1957: Kansai University

Senior career*
| Years | Team | Apps | (Gls) |
| 1958–???? | Dunlop Japan | | |

International career
| 1958–1961 | Japan | 14 | (1) |
- * Club domestic league appearances and goals

Koji Sasaki (佐々木 康治, Sasaki Kōji; born January 30, 1936) is a former Japanese football player. He played for Japan national team.

== Club career ==
Sasaki was born on January 30, 1936. After graduating from Kansai University, he joined Dunlop Japan in 1958.

== National team career ==
On December 25, 1958, he debuted for Japan national team against Hong Kong. He played 14 games and scored 1 goal for Japan until 1961.

== National team statistics ==
Japan national team
| Year | Apps | Goals |
|---|---|---|
| 1958 | 2 | 0 |
| 1959 | 8 | 0 |
| 1960 | 1 | 1 |
| 1961 | 3 | 0 |
| Total | 14 | 1 |
