= Koji Funamoto =

Japanese footballer

Koji Funamoto 船本 幸路
Personal information
- Full name: Koji Funamoto
- Date of birth: August 12, 1942 (age 84)
- Place of birth: Hiroshima, Hiroshima, Empire of Japan
- Height: 1.77 m (5 ft 9 1/2 in)
- Position: Goalkeeper

Youth career
- 1958–1960: Hiroshima University High School

Senior career*
| Years | Team | Apps | (Gls) |
| 1961–1975 | Toyo Industries | 166 | (0) |
| Total | | 166 | (0) |

International career
| 1967–1975 | Japan | 19 | (0) |
Medal record
Toyo Industries
| Winner | Japan Soccer League | 1965 |
| Winner | Japan Soccer League | 1966 |
| Winner | Japan Soccer League | 1967 |
| Winner | Japan Soccer League | 1968 |
| Winner | Japan Soccer League | 1970 |
| Runner-up | Japan Soccer League | 1969 |
| Winner | Emperor's Cup | 1965 |
| Winner | Emperor's Cup | 1967 |
| Winner | Emperor's Cup | 1969 |
| Runner-up | Emperor's Cup | 1966 |
| Runner-up | Emperor's Cup | 1970 |
- * Club domestic league appearances and goals

Koji Funamoto (船本 幸路, Funamoto Koji; born August 12, 1942) is a former Japanese football player. He played for Japan national team.

== Youth career ==
Funamoto was born in Hiroshima on August 12, 1942. He played for Hiroshima University High School from 1958 to 1960. He and teammates Aritatsu Ogi, Yasuyuki Kuwahara, Takayuki Kuwata, Kensei Mizote, and Sonkyo Nomura became locally famous together by leading their school to a second-place finish in the All Japan High School Soccer Tournament in 1959. Ogi, Kuwahara, Funamoto, and Mizote carried the team to the quarterfinals of this tournament in 1960. Funamoto moved on to club football immediately after high school, while Ogi, Kuwahara, and Kuwata would play four years at Chuo University before joining Funamoto in club play with Toyo Industries.

== Club career ==
Funamoto joined the Toyo Industries in 1961. Toyo then won the National Sports Festival football tournament in 1962 and were Emperor's Cup semifinalists (1961, 1962) and quarterfinalists (1963) with Funamoto at goalkeeper. In 1965, the club became an inaugural member of the newly formed Japan Soccer League (JSL), the first national league of soccer clubs in Japan. He remained with the club for 11 seasons in the JSL until his retirement in 1975. In 11 seasons, he played all matches, 166 matches in the league.

With Funamoto and his former high school teammates, Toyo dominated the JSL for the first six years, winning the championship five times (1965, 1966, 1967, 1968, 1970) and placing second once (1969). The club won the Emperor's Cup three times (1965, 1967, 1969) during this period and finished third in the Asian Club Championship in 1969. As goalkeeper, Funamoto played a critical role on Toyo's early success in the JSL when they won 75 of their first 112 matches (67%), allowing opponents just 87 goals. He was named goalkeeper of the year in the JSL in 1970. The golden era of Hiroshima football then came to an end over the next three years when the club won 15 of 54 matches (28%), while allowing 82 goals.

== National team career ==
In September 1967, Funamoto was selected Japan national team for 1968 Summer Olympics qualification. At this qualification, on September 27, he debuted against Philippines. He shared goalkeeping duties with two-time Olympian, Kenzo Yokoyama, on the Japan national team from 1967 to 1975. Funamoto appeared in 19 matches, 17 as a starter and 2 as a substitute, shutting out opponents 5 times. He allowed 25 goals, while the Japan team went 9-8-2 (W-L-D). He played in the Pestabola Merdeka (1970, 1972, 1975), Asian Games (1970), AFC Asian Cup qualifiers (1975), Olympic Games qualifiers (1967), and FIFA World Cup qualifiers (1969, 1973) during his International career.

== After retirement ==
Funamoto retired after the 1975 season after 15 years with Toyo Industries and 11 years in the JSL. He served as goalkeeper coach from 1975 to 1980 for Toyo Industries and for the Japan national team from 1979 to 1980. He lectured at the Mazda soccer school from 1981 to 2007. His proteges included Kenichi Uemura, Kenji Wakai, and Masaaki Toma. He worked in the Mazda business office until his retirement.

After he retired, he served as a match commissioner of the J.League until 2007 and that of Japan Football League since 2008. He currently enjoys retirement in Hiroshima City, playing golf with friends, gardening, and watching football with his family.

== Club statistics ==
JSL Player/Club Statistics
| Year | Club | Appearances | Club Record (W-L-D) | League Standing | Club Goals Allowed | Tournament Results |
|---|---|---|---|---|---|---|
| 1965 | Toyo Industries | 14 | 12-0-2 | 1 | 9 | Emperor's Cup champion |
| 1966 | Toyo Industries | 14 | 12-1-1 | 1 | 6 | Emperor's Cup 2nd Place |
| 1967 | Toyo Industries | 14 | 10-2-2 | 1 | 16 | Emperor's Cup champion |
| 1968 | Toyo Industries | 14 | 10-3-1 | 1 | 11 | |
| 1969 | Toyo Industries | 14 | 10-3-1 | 2 | 10 | Emperor's Cup champion, AFC club championship 3rd Place |
| 1970 | Toyo Industries | 14 | 11-2-1 | 1 | 5 | Emperor's Cup 2nd Place |
| 1971 | Toyo Industries | 14 | 3-7-4 | 6 | 17 | |
| 1972 | Toyo Industries | 14 | 7-5-2 | 3 | 13 | Emperor's Cup 3rd Place |
| 1973 | Toyo Industries | 18 | 5-8-5 | 8 | 28 | Emperor's Cup semifinalist |
| 1974 | Toyo Industries | 18 | 6-6-6 | 6 | 25 | Emperor's Cup semifinalist |
| 1975 | Toyo Industries | 18 | 4-10-4 | 8 | 29 | |
| Totals | | 166 | 90-47-29 | | 169 | |

== National team statistics ==
Japan national team
| Year | Apps | Goals |
|---|---|---|
| 1967 | 1 | 0 |
| 1968 | 1 | 0 |
| 1969 | 1 | 0 |
| 1970 | 1 | 0 |
| 1971 | 0 | 0 |
| 1972 | 5 | 0 |
| 1973 | 2 | 0 |
| 1974 | 0 | 0 |
| 1975 | 8 | 0 |
| Total | 19 | 0 |

== Awards ==
- Japan Soccer League Best Eleven: 1970
