= Michihiro Ozawa =

Japanese footballer

Michihiro Ozawa 小沢 通宏
Personal information
- Full name: Michihiro Ozawa
- Date of birth: December 25, 1932 (age 93)
- Place of birth: Utsunomiya, Tochigi, Empire of Japan
- Height: 1.73 m (5 ft 8 in)
- Positions: Midfielder; defender

Youth career
- 1948–1950: Utsunomiya High School

College career
Years	Team	Apps	(Gls)
1951–1954	Tokyo University of Education		

Senior career*
Years	Team	Apps	(Gls)
1955–1967	Toyo Industries	42	(0)
Total		42	(0)

International career
1956–1964	Japan	36	(0)
Medal record
Toyo Industries
Winner	Japan Soccer League	1965
Winner	Japan Soccer League	1966
Winner	Japan Soccer League	1967
Winner	Emperor's Cup	1965
Winner	Emperor's Cup	1967
Runner-up	Emperor's Cup	1957
Runner-up	Emperor's Cup	1966
- * Club domestic league appearances and goals

Michihiro Ozawa (小沢 通宏, Ozawa Michihiro; born December 25, 1932) is a former Japanese football player. He played for Japan national team.

== Club career ==
Ozawa was born in Utsunomiya on December 25, 1932. After graduating from Tokyo University of Education, he joined Toyo Industries in 1955. In 1962, he was selected Japanese Footballer of the Year awards. In 1965, Toyo Industries joined new league Japan Soccer League. He retired in 1967. He played 42 games and the club also won the championship for 3 years in a row (1965-1967) in the league.

== National team career ==
In June 1956, he was selected Japan national team for 1956 Summer Olympics qualification. At this qualification, on June 3, he debuted against South Korea. In November, he played at 1956 Summer Olympics in Melbourne. He also played at 1958 and 1962 Asian Games. In 1964, when he was 31 years old, he was the captain of Japan national team, but he was not selected as a member for 1964 Summer Olympics in Tokyo for generational change. He played 36 games for Japan until 1964.

In 2014, Ozawa was selected Japan Football Hall of Fame.

== National team statistics ==
Japan national team
Year	Apps	Goals
1956	3	0
1957	0	0
1958	4	0
1959	9	0
1960	1	0
1961	6	0
1962	7	0
1963	5	0
1964	1	0
Total	36	0

== Honours ==
- Japan Football Hall of Fame: Inducted in 2014
