= Ryozo Suzuki =

Japanese footballer (born 1939)

Ryozo Suzuki 鈴木 良三
Personal information
- Full name: Ryozo Suzuki
- Date of birth: September 20, 1939 (age 87)
- Place of birth: Saitama, Saitama, Empire of Japan
- Height: 1.74 m (5 ft 8 1/2 in)
- Position: Defender

Youth career
- 1955–1957: Urawa Nishi High School
- 1958–1961: Rikkyo University

Senior career*
Years	Team	Apps	(Gls)
1962–1970	Hitachi	67	(5)
Total		67	(5)

International career
1961–1968	Japan	24	(0)
Medal record
Hitachi
Runner-up	Emperor's Cup	1963
Representing Japan
Olympic Games
Bronze medal – third place	1968 Mexico City	Team
Asian Games
Bronze medal – third place	1966 Bangkok	Team
- * Club domestic league appearances and goals

Ryozo Suzuki (鈴木 良三, Suzuki Ryōzō; born September 20, 1939) is a former Japanese football player. He played for Japan national team.

== Club career ==
Suzuki was born in Saitama on September 20, 1939. After graduating from Rikkyo University, he joined Hitachi in 1962. In 1965, Hitachi joined new league Japan Soccer League. He retired in 1970. He played 67 games and scored 5 goals in the league.

== National team career ==
On August 15, 1961, when Suzuki was a Rikkyo University student, he debuted for Japan national team against Indonesia. In 1964, he was selected Japan for 1964 Summer Olympics in Tokyo and he played all matches. In 1968, he was also selected Japan for 1968 Summer Olympics in Mexico City. Although he did not play in the match, Japan won Bronze Medal. In 2018, this team was selected Japan Football Hall of Fame. He also played at 1962 and 1966 Asian Games. He played 24 games for Japan until 1968.

In 2010, Suzuki was selected Japan Football Hall of Fame.

== Personal life ==
Chiharu Saitō from the Japanese girl idol group Nogizaka46 is Suzuki's great niece.

== Club statistics ==
Club performance			League	
Season	Club	League	Apps	Goals
Japan			League	
1965	Hitachi	JSL Division 1		3
1966	Hitachi	JSL Division 1		0
1967	Hitachi	JSL Division 1		1
1968	Hitachi	JSL Division 1		0
1969	Hitachi	JSL Division 1		1
1970	Hitachi	JSL Division 1		0
Total			67	5

== National team statistics ==
Japan national team
Year	Apps	Goals
1961	1	0
1962	7	0
1963	5	0
1964	2	0
1965	1	0
1966	6	0
1967	0	0
1968	2	0
Total	24	0

== Honours ==
- Japan Football Hall of Fame: Inducted in 2010
