= Hiroshi Katayama =

Japanese footballer (born 1940)

Hiroshi Katayama 片山 洋
Personal information
- Full name: Hiroshi Katayama
- Date of birth: May 28, 1940 (age 86)
- Place of birth: Meguro, Tokyo, Empire of Japan
- Height: 1.70 m (5 ft 7 in)
- Position: Defender

Youth career
- 1956–1958: Keio High School
- 1959–1962: Keio University

Senior career*
Years	Team	Apps	(Gls)
1963–1972	Mitsubishi Motors	107	(3)
Total		107	(3)

International career
1961–1971	Japan	38	(0)
Medal record
Mitsubishi Motors
Winner	Japan Soccer League	1969
Runner-up	Japan Soccer League	1970
Runner-up	Japan Soccer League	1971
Winner	Emperor's Cup	1971
Runner-up	Emperor's Cup	1967
Runner-up	Emperor's Cup	1968
Representing Japan
Olympic Games
Bronze medal – third place	1968 Mexico City	Team
Asian Games
Bronze medal – third place	1966 Bangkok	Team
- * Club domestic league appearances and goals

Hiroshi Katayama (片山 洋, Katayama Hiroshi; born May 28, 1940) is a former Japanese football player. He played for Japan national team. His father Yutaka Katayama was the former president of Nissan USA.

== Club career ==
Katayama was born in Meguro, Tokyo on May 28, 1940. After graduating from Keio University, he joined Mitsubishi Motors in 1963. In 1965, Mitsubishi Motors joined new league Japan Soccer League. He won the champions in 1969. He also won 1971 Emperor's Cup. He retired in 1972. He played 107 games and scored 3 goals in the league. He was selected Best Eleven for 5 years in a row (1966-1970).

== National team career ==
On August 2, 1961, when Katayama was a Keio University student, he debuted for Japan national team against Malaya. He was selected Japan for 1964 Summer Olympics in Tokyo and 1968 Summer Olympics in Mexico City. He played in all matches at both Olympics and won Bronze Medal at 1968 Olympics. In 2018, this team was selected Japan Football Hall of Fame. He also played at 1966 Asian Games. At 1972 Summer Olympics qualification in 1971, Japan's failure to qualify for 1972 Summer Olympics. This qualification was his last game for Japan. He played 38 games for Japan until 1971.

In 2007, Katayama was selected Japan Football Hall of Fame.

== Club statistics ==
Club performance			League	
Season	Club	League	Apps	Goals
Japan			League	
1965	Mitsubishi Motors	JSL Division 1	14	1
1966	Mitsubishi Motors	JSL Division 1	14	1
1967	Mitsubishi Motors	JSL Division 1	13	0
1968	Mitsubishi Motors	JSL Division 1	14	0
1969	Mitsubishi Motors	JSL Division 1	14	0
1970	Mitsubishi Motors	JSL Division 1	14	1
1971	Mitsubishi Motors	JSL Division 1	14	0
1972	Mitsubishi Motors	JSL Division 1	10	0
Total			107	3

== National team statistics ==
Japan national team
Year	Apps	Goals
1961	4	0
1962	1	0
1963	5	0
1964	1	0
1965	4	0
1966	6	0
1967	5	0
1968	3	0
1969	4	0
1970	0	0
1971	5	0
Total	38	0

== Awards ==
- Japan Soccer League Best Eleven: 1966, 1967, 1968, 1969, 1970
- Asian All Stars: 1968
- Japan Football Hall of Fame: Inducted in 2007
