= 1965 Japan Soccer League =

Japan Soccer League
- Season: 1965
- Champions: Toyo Industries; 1st title
- Matches played: 56
- Goals scored: 216 (3.86 per match)
- Top goalscorer: Mutsuhiko Nomura (15 goals)
- Average attendance: 3,706

The 1965 season in Japanese football saw the formation of the Japan Soccer League, the first national league in Japan for football clubs. Eight teams took part in the championship, playing on a home and away basis. Toyo Industries were crowned the first champions, whilst Nagoya Mutual Bank came bottom and entered and end of season promotion/relegation match to stay in the top flight. They won this, 6–3 on aggregate against Nippon Kokan.

== Teams ==
Eight clubs entered the first ever edition of the Japan Soccer League; Furukawa Electric, Hitachi, Mitsubishi Motors, Nagoya Mutual Bank, Toyo Industries, Toyoda Automatic Loom Works, Yanmar Diesel and Yawata Steel

Locations of the 1965 Japan Soccer League

== League tables ==
=== Japan Soccer League ===
Pos	Team	Pld	W	D	L	GF	GA	GD	Pts	Qualification
1	Toyo Industries	14	12	2	0	44	9	+35	26	Champions
2	Yawata Steel	14	11	2	1	40	14	+26	24	
3	Furukawa Electric	14	10	0	4	32	20	+12	20	
4	Hitachi	14	8	1	5	35	19	+16	17	
5	Mitsubishi Motors	14	4	1	9	24	39	−15	9	
6	Toyoda Automatic Loom Works	14	2	3	9	16	31	−15	7	
7	Yanmar Diesel	14	2	1	11	9	41	−32	5	
8	Nagoya Mutual Bank	14	1	2	11	16	43	−27	4	To promotion/relegation Series

=== Promotion/relegation Series ===
JSL 8th Place	1st leg	2nd leg	Senior Cup Winner
Nagoya Mutual Bank	5–1	1–2	Nippon Kokan

Nagoya Mutual Bank stays in JSL.

== All-Star Game ==
December 2, 1965

JSL XI	2 – 2	(Sweden) AIK Fotboll

Mitsuzawa Stadium, Yokohama
