= 1963 in Japan =

- Decades: 1940s; 1950s; 1960s; 1970s; 1980s
- See also: Other events of 1963; History of Japan • Timeline • Years

Events in the year 1963 in Japan.

== Incumbents ==
- Emperor: Hirohito
- Prime Minister: Hayato Ikeda (Liberal Democratic)
- Chief Cabinet Secretary: Yasumi Kurogane
- Chief Justice of the Supreme Court: Kōtarō Tanaka
- President of the House of Representatives: Ichirō Kiyose until October 23, Naka Funada from December 7
- President of the House of Councillors: Yūzō Shigemune

=== Governors ===
- Aichi Prefecture: Mikine Kuwahara
- Akita Prefecture: Yūjirō Obata
- Aomori Prefecture: Iwao Yamazaki (until 26 January); Shunkichi Takeuchi (starting 2 March)
- Chiba Prefecture: Hisaaki Kano (until 21 February); Taketo Tomonō (starting 17 April)
- Ehime Prefecture: Sadatake Hisamatsu
- Fukui Prefecture: Eizō Kita
- Fukuoka Prefecture: Taichi Uzaki
- Fukushima Prefecture: Zenichiro Satō
- Gifu Prefecture: Yukiyasu Matsuno
- Gunma Prefecture: Konroku Kanda
- Hiroshima Prefecture: Iduo Nagano
- Hokkaido: Kingo Machimura
- Hyogo Prefecture: Motohiko Kanai
- Ibaraki Prefecture: Nirō Iwakami
- Ishikawa Prefecture: Jūjitsu Taya (until 19 February); Yōichi Nakanishi (starting 20 February)
- Iwate Prefecture: Senichi Abe (until 29 April); Tadashi Chida (starting 30 April)
- Kagawa Prefecture: Masanori Kaneko
- Kagoshima Prefecture: Katsushi Terazono
- Kanagawa Prefecture: Iwataro Uchiyama
- Kochi Prefecture: Masumi Mizobuchi
- Kumamoto Prefecture: Kōsaku Teramoto
- Kyoto Prefecture: Torazō Ninagawa
- Mie Prefecture: Satoru Tanaka
- Miyagi Prefecture: Yoshio Miura
- Miyazaki Prefecture: Hiroshi Kuroki
- Nagano Prefecture: Gon'ichirō Nishizawa
- Nagasaki Prefecture: Katsuya Sato
- Nara Prefecture: Ryozo Okuda
- Niigata Prefecture: Juichiro Tsukada
- Oita Prefecture: Kaoru Kinoshita
- Okayama Prefecture: Yukiharu Miki
- Osaka Prefecture: Gisen Satō
- Saga Prefecture: Sunao Ikeda
- Saitama Prefecture: Hiroshi Kurihara
- Shiga Prefecture: Kyujiro Taniguchi
- Shiname Prefecture: Choemon Tanabe
- Shizuoka Prefecture: Toshio Saitō
- Tochigi Prefecture: Nobuo Yokokawa
- Tokushima Prefecture: Kikutaro Hara
- Tokyo: Ryōtarō Azuma
- Tottori Prefecture: Jirō Ishiba
- Toyama Prefecture: Minoru Yoshida
- Wakayama Prefecture: Shinji Ono
- Yamagata Prefecture: Tōkichi Abiko
- Yamaguchi Prefecture: Masayuki Hashimoto
- Yamanashi Prefecture: Hisashi Amano

== Events ==
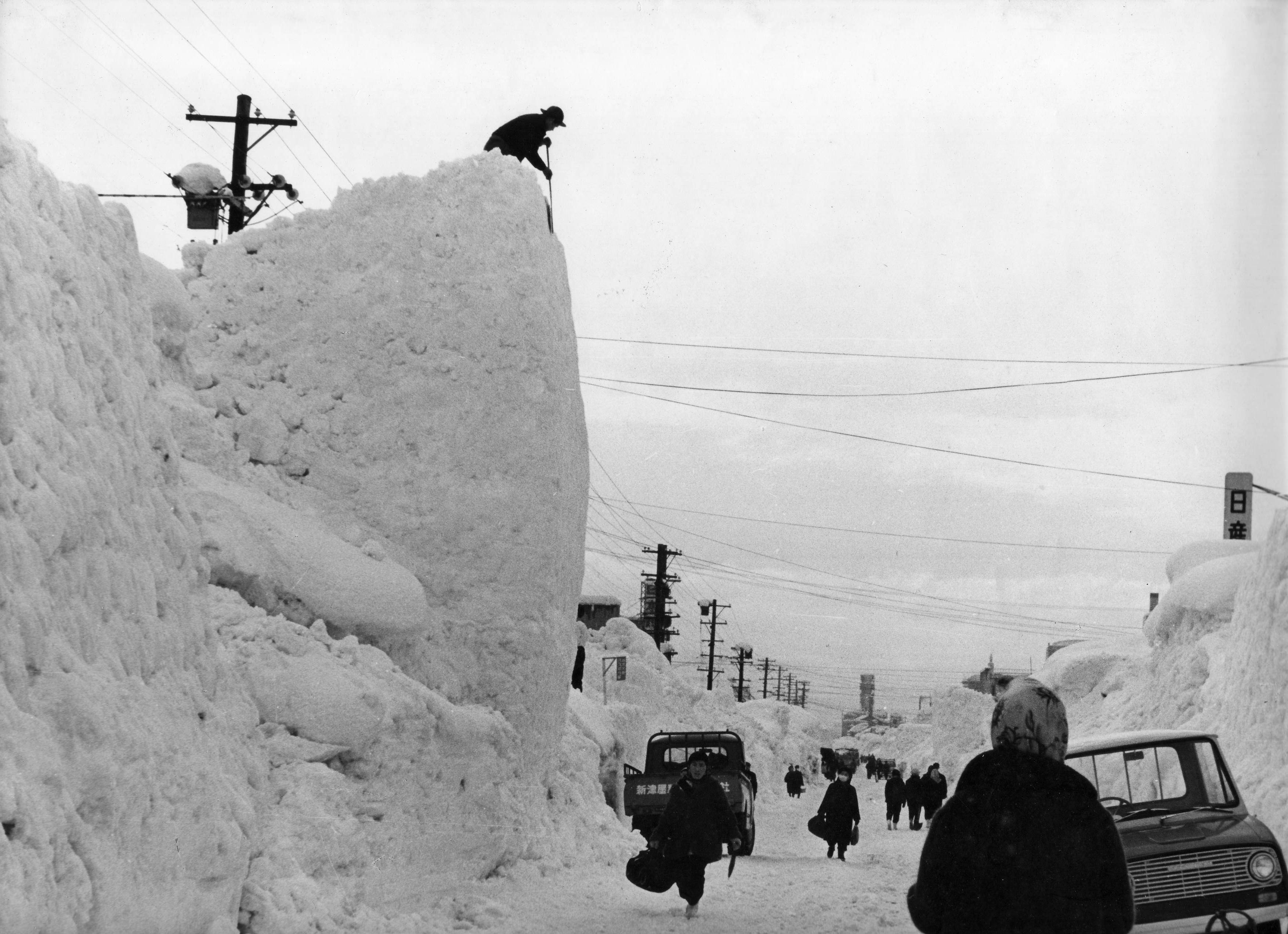
A recordable snowfall in Nagaoka, Niigata Prefecture, in January 1963

- January and February – 1963 Snowstorm in Japan, a heavy snowstorm with blizzard, following avalanche hit in northeastern Honshu, according to Japan Fire and Disaster Management Agency confirmed report, 231 people lost their lives, 356 people were wounded.
- February 10 – Five cities on northernmost part of Kyushu merge to become city of Kitakyushu
- February 26 – According to Japan Coast Guard official confirmed report, a passenger ship Tokiwa Maru sank by collision with logistic ship Richmond Maru off Kobe Port, Hyogo Prefecture, total 47 passengers and crew were fatalities.
- April 19 – Amataro Sweets Teahouse, as predecessor of Colowide Restaurant Group, founded in Zushi, Kanagawa Prefecture.
- May 1 – Sayama Incident
- May 21 – Establishment of the Seppiko-Mineyama Prefectural Natural Park
- July 15 – Establishment of the Sanin Kaigan National Park
- July 24 – Establishment of the Chōkai Quasi-National Park
- August 8 – Establishment of the Zaō Quasi-National Park
- September 14 – Tokyo Convention
- November 9 – Mitsui Miike Coal Mine disaster – coal mine explosion kills 458.
- November 9 – Tsurumi rail accident – 161 deaths result from triple train disaster in Yokohama
- November 11 – Tokyo Electron was founded.
- November 21 – General election – Liberal Democratic Party win 283 out of 467 seats.
- December 7 – Decision on the Ryuichi Shimoda v. The State case

== Educational institutions established ==
- Fukuyama City Junior College for Women
- Hakodate Otani College
- Kobe International University
- Niigata Woman's College
- Sanyo Women's College
- Seitoku Junior College of Nutrition
- Shiga Prefectural Ishiyama High School
- Toyama Women's College
- Toyama University of International Studies
- Tsuruoka National College of Technology
- Tsuyama National College of Technology

== Buildings and structures ==
- February 28 – Opening of Higashi-ginza Station
- November 20 – Commissioning of Otori Dam

== Culture ==
- March 1 – Establishment of the National Museum of Modern Art, Kyoto

=== Arts and entertainment ===
For events in anime, see 1963 in anime. For Japanese films released this year, see List of Japanese films of 1963. For events in television, see 1963 in Japanese television. For music, see 1963 in Japanese music.

- April 1 – First issue of Boy's Life magazine
- September 6 – Establishment of Crown Records record label
- First issue of Margaret magazine
- Establishment of the Hiroshima Symphony Orchestra

=== Sports ===
In association football, see 1963 in Japanese football. The 1963 Emperor's Cup was won by Waseda University.

In baseball, see 1963 Nippon Professional Baseball season and 1963 Japan Series.

In motorsport, the first Japanese Grand Prix took place at the Suzuka Circuit.

In tennis, Japan was defeated in the Eastern zone final by India in the 1963 Davis Cup.

Establishment of the All-Japan Rugby Football Championship.

== Births ==
- January 10 – Tarō Kōno, politician
- January 30 – Shōko Tsuda, voice actress
- March 14 – Mahiro Maeda, animator
- March 16 – Eiji Aonuma, game designer
- March 20 – Hiroshi Watari, actor of 1983 Space Sheriff Series Uchuu Keiji Sharivan & 1986 Metal Hero Jikuu Senshi Spielban
- March 24 – Keiichi Wada, actor of 1993 Super Sentai Gosei Sentai Dairanger as Fire Star/Ryou
- March 26 – Natsuhiko Kyogoku, writer
- March 28 – Chieko Honda, voice actress (d. 2013)
- April 27 – Sadaaki Yoshimura, former professional baseball player
- May 5 – Kimiyasu Kudo, professional baseball coach and former pitcher
- May 11 – Masatoshi Hamada, comedian and actor
- May 12 – Toshiya Fuji, actor of 1990 Super Sentai of Last 80's and 90's Super Sentai Chikyuu Sentai Fiveman as Five Red/Gaku Hoshikawa.
- May 29 – Ukyo Katayama, racing driver
- August 7 – Hiroaki Hirata, voice actor
- August 8
  - Rica Fukami, voice actress
  - Emi Shinohara, voice actress (d. 2024)
- August 9 – Zentarō Watanabe, music producer (d. 2021)
- August 24 – Hideo Kojima, video-game director
- September 8 – Hitoshi Matsumoto, comedian and film director
- September 17 – Masahiro Chono, professional wrestler
- September 21 – Mamoru Samuragochi
- October 12 – Satoshi Kon, anime director (d. 2010)
- November 23 – Yoshino Takamori, voice actress
- December 8 – Toshiaki Kawada, professional wrestler
- December 9 – Empress Masako, empress of Japan
- December 12 – Ai Orikasa, voice actress and singer
- December 18 – Rikiya Koyama, voice actor
- December 22 – Luna H. Mitani, Surrealist painter

== Deaths ==
- February 18 – Tokugawa Iemasa, politician, 17th head of former Tokugawa shogunate (b. 1884)
- April 14 – Kodō Nomura, novelist and music critic (b. 1882)
- June 11 – Yuzo Kawashima, film director (b. 1918)
- September 15 – Gyosaku Morozumi, general (b. 1884)
- December 2 – Nobutsuna Sasaki, tanka poet (b. 1872)
- December 10 – Yōko Ōta, writer (b. 1906)
- December 12 – Yasujirō Ozu, filmmaker (b. 1903)

== See also ==
- 1963 in Japanese television
- List of Japanese films of 1963
