= Fukui Culture Television =

Fukui Culture Television (Japanese: 福井文化テレビジョン, Hepburn: Fukui Bunka Terebijon) was a proposed television channel which was set to become the third commercial television station in Fukui Prefecture.

== History ==
=== Background ===
On October 16, 1992, the Radio Regulatory Council submitted a report to the Minister of Posts and Telecommunications regarding changes to the Basic Broadcasting Promotion Plan to open a third station in Fukui Prefecture (same day as the granting of a third station in Kochi Prefecture and a third and fourth station in Ehime Prefecture). On December 18, the Ministry of Posts and Telecommunications assigned a third frequency, UHF channel 23, to Fukui Prefecture.

The background behind the assignment of the third station to Fukui Prefecture is that in the early 1990s, Ishikawa Prefecture's TV Kanazawa (opened on April 1, 1990), Hokuriku Asahi Broadcasting (opened on October 1, 1991), and Toyama's Tulip TV (opened on October 1, 1990, then TV U Toyama) opened successively. Furthermore, before the opening of Hokuriku Asahi Broadcasting, the then director of the Hokuriku Telecommunications Supervision Bureau of the Ministry of Posts and Telecommunications (currently the Hokuriku General Communications Bureau of the Ministry of Internal Affairs and Communications) said in Ishikawa Prefecture, "We would like to promote multicasting in Fukui Prefecture as well".

=== After frequency allocation ===
After frequency allocation, the Ministry of Posts and Telecommunications began accepting applications. As of the February 26, 1993 deadline, 11 companies had applied.

Main business operator who applied (business name and representative name, both at the time of application)

- Fukui Bunka Television (Kanezo Kanai, chairman of Kanai Gakuen Educational Corporation)
- Phoenix TV (Hokuriku Gakuen Educational Corporation chairman Fumihiko Sakao)
- Fukui Kenmin Television (president of Emori Corporation, Mikio Emori)
- Nikkan Sports
- TV-U Fukui (Hokukoku Shimbun president, Shuichi Tobita)
- Fukui Daiichi Television (president of Hokkoku Kanko)

After that, a commercial broadcasting establishment preparation office was established, with Mikio Emori, then president of Emori Corporation, as its representative, in order to coordinate unification and negotiate key stations.

=== Giving up its planned opening ===
Afterwards, the office negotiated with Tokyo Broadcasting System (then the predecessor of current TBS TV) for an affiliation agreement, but TBS's market was small compared to neighboring prefectures Ishikawa and Toyama. Due to the high penetration rate of cable television such as Fukui Cable Television and Reinan Cable Network, they had expressed a reluctant policy to set up a station in Fukui Prefecture. Because of this, negotiations switched to TV Asahi, but they responded that they would deal with it through a cross-net network at Fukui Broadcasting.

Furthermore, on March 29, 1995, the report of the Ministry of Posts and Telecommunications' "Council on the Multimedia Era" stated that the introduction of digital television would be possible from the early 2000s. On April 25 of the same year, approximately one month after the report was released, the policy of four commercial television stations in one prefecture was changed, and the opening of new stations would end in May 1996 per a change in policy. Even if they were able to open a new station, they would have to immediately adapt to digitalization, which would increase the cost burden, so they gave up on opening one in Fukui Prefecture.

On March 18, 1998, the Private Broadcasting Establishment Preparation Office was dissolved. All businesses that applied by November 30 of the same year withdrew their applications, and on January 18 of the following year, 1999, the Ministry of Posts and Telecommunications canceled the UHF channel 23 license allocated to Fukui Prefecture.
