= List of Japanese films of 1963 =

A list of films released in Japan in 1963 (see 1963 in film).

== List of films ==
Japanese films released in 1963
Title	Japanese Title	Release date	Director	Cast	Genre	Notes
	セロひきのゴーシュ	1963.__.__	Matsue Jinbo			
	小さな冒険旅行	1963.__.__	Nagisa Ōshima			
	海女の怪真珠	1963.01.01	Satoru Kobayashi			
	東京の夜	1963.01.__				
	女が泣く夜	1963.01.__	Takeo Takagi			
	不貞母娘	1963.01.__	Takeo Takagi			
	九ちゃんの大当りさかさま仁義	1963.01.03	Yūsuke Watanabe			
	社長漫遊記	1963.01.03	Toshio Sugie			
Shinsengumi Chronicles	新選組始末記	1963.01.03	Kenji Misumi		Jidai-geki	
Tokaido Full House	勢揃い東海道	1963.01.03	Sadatsugu Matsuda		Jidai-geki	
	青い山脈	1963.01.03	Katsumi Nishikawa			
Attack Squadron!	太平洋の翼	1963.01.03	Shue Matsubayashi	Toshiro Mifune, Yūzō Kayama, Yosuke Natsuki		
Third Man: Bad Reputation	第三の悪名	1963.01.03	Tokuzō Tanaka		Yakuza	
	野生のラーラ	1963.01.05	Toshio Kitazato			
	あの橋の畔で 第3部	1963.01.06	Yoshitarō Nomura			
	歌え若人達	1963.01.06	Keisuke Kinoshita			
Travels of Hibari and Chiemi 2: The Lovebird's 1000 Ryo Umbrella	ひばり・チエミのおしどり千両傘	1963.01.09	Tadashi Sawashima		Jidai-geki	
Bored Hatamoto: The Mysterious Cape	旗本退屈男 謎の龍神岬	1963.01.09	Yasushi Sasaki		Jidai-geki	
	いつでも夢を	1963.01.11	Takashi Nomura			
Ume no Taka	海の鷹	1963.01.11	Takumi Furukawa		Yakuza	
	古都	1963.01.13	Noboru Nakamura			
	黒の報告書	1963.01.13	Yasuzō Masumura			
	咲子さんちょっと	1963.01.13	Kinya Sakai			
An Actor's Revenge	雪之丞変化	1963.01.13	Kon Ichikawa	Kazuo Hasegawa, Fujiko Yamamoto, Ayako Wakao	Jidai-geki	
Underworld Boss: Eleven Gang Members	暗黒街の顔役 十一人のギャング	1963.01.15	Teruo Ishii		Yakuza	
Tasuke Isshin: The Lone Man From Dochu	一心太助 男一匹道中記	1963.01.15	Tadashi Sawashima		Jidai-geki	
	憂愁平野	1963.01.15	Shirō Toyoda			
Onna ni tsuyokunaru kuhu no kazukazu	女に強くなる工夫の数々	1963.01.15	Yasuki Chiba	Akira Takarada, Tadao Takashima, Hitoshi Ueki		
	サラリーマン物語 勝ってくるぞ勇ましく	1963.01.23	Ren Yoshimura			
	べらんめえ芸者と丁稚社長	1963.01.23	Kunio Watanabe			
	灼熱の椅子	1963.01.23	Hiroshi Noguchi			
	大暴れ五十三次	1963.01.23	Masahiro Makino		Jidai-geki	
	38年大相撲初場所 前半戦	1963.01.27	Torahiko Ise [composition]			
	七人の刑事	1963.01.27	Yoshikazu Ōtsuki			
	美しき北海道	1963.01.27	Sakuzō Saitō			
The Mysterious Purple Hood	変幻紫頭巾	1963.01.27	Eiichi Kudō		Jidai-geki	
Escape From Hell	無宿人別帳	1963.01.27	Kazuo Inoue		Jidai-geki	
Detective Bureau 23: Go to Hell, Bastards!	探偵事務所23 たばれ悪党ども	1963.01.27	Seijun Suzuki	Joe Shishido, Reiko Sasamori, Nobuo Kaneko	Crime	
	社長と令嬢と秘書 全国民謡歌合戦	1963.01.29	Toshirō Ōmi			
	六本木の夜 愛して愛して	1963.01.29	Katsuki Iwauchi			
Hai hai 3 nin musume	ハイハイ3人娘	1963.01.29	Kozo Saeki	Mie Nakao, Mari Sono, Yukari Ito	Musical comedy	
	こまどりのりんごっ子姉妹	1963.01.30	Masamitsu Igayama			
	機動捜査班 裸の眼	1963.01.30	Isamu Kosugi			
	みんなわが子	1963.02.01	Miyoji Ieki			
	女は？で勝負する	1963.02.__				
	38年大相撲初場所 後半戦	1963.02.03	Torahiko Ise [composition]			
Sasurai no Toranpetto	さすらいのトランペット	1963.02.03	Hiroshi Noguchi		Yakuza	
	都会の奔流	1963.02.03	Motomu Ida			
Morning Glow over the Tone	関東遊侠伝 利根の朝焼け	1963.02.06	Toshikazu Kōno		Jidai-geki	
	第八空挺部隊 壮烈鬼隊長	1963.02.06	Tsuneo Kobayashi			
	温泉芸者	1963.02.07	Sōkichi Tomimoto			
	破れ傘長庵	1963.02.07	Kazuo Mori		Jidai-geki	
Sarariiman muteppo ikka	サラリーマン無鉄砲一家	1963.02.08	Masanori Kakei	Daisuke Katō, Mie Hama, Yumi Shirakawa		
Tokyo Orinppiku eno michi	東京オリンピックへの道	1963.02.08	Kiyohiko Ushihara [Supervision]	Seigoro Kitade	Documentary	
	星屑の町	1963.02.09	Kunio Matoi			
	彼女に向って突進せよ	1963.02.09	Hirokazu Ichimura			
Tattoo of Love	いれずみ半太郎	1963.02.10	Masahiro Makino		Jidai-geki	
	警視庁物語 ウラ付け捜査	1963.02.10	Hajime Satō			
	泥だらけの純情	1963.02.10	Kō Nakahira			
La Fee Diabolique	素晴らしい悪女	1963.02.16	Hideo Onchi	Reiko Dan, Akira Kubo, Taro	Drama	
Sensation Seekers	にっぽん実話時代	1963.02.16	Jun Fukuda	Tadao Takashima, Jun Ikeuchi, Mie Hama		
	波止場の賭博師	1963.02.17	Tokujirō Yamazaki			
	風の視線	1963.02.17	Yoshirō Kawazu			
Koi To Jutte To Suri	恋と十手と巾着切	1963.02.17	Masahiko Izawa		Jidai-geki	
	恋と出世に強くなれ！	1963.02.17	Kinya Sakai			
A Brave Ronin	浪人街の顔役	1963.02.17	Yasushi Sasaki		Jidai-geki	
	背広の忍者	1963.02.19	Tarō Yuge			
	八月生れの女	1963.02.19	Shigeo Tanaka			
	サラリーマン物語 大器晩成	1963.02.20	Masahisa Sunohara			
Gang vs G-Men: Group Treasury Escape	ギャング対Gメン 集団金庫破り	1963.02.23	Teruo Ishii		Yakuza	
Yagyu Chronicles 5: Jubei's Redemption	柳生武芸帳 片目の十兵衛	1963.02.23	Kōkichi Uchide		Jidai-geki / Ninja	
Young Samurai	サムライの子	1963.02.24	Mitsuo Wakasugi		Jidai-geki	
	空の下遠い夢	1963.02.24	Yōichi Ushihara			
Cut the Shadow	影を斬る	1963.03.01	Kazuo Ikehiro		Jidai-geki	
	停年退職	1963.03.01	Kōji Shima			
High and Low	天国と地獄	1963.03.01	Akira Kurosawa	Toshirō Mifune, Tatsuya Nakadai, Kyōko Kagawa	Drama	
Zoku Shacho manyuki	続社長漫遊記	1963.03.01	Toshio Sugie	Hisaya Morishige, Keiju Kobayashi, Norihei Miki	Comedy	
	悪名高きろくでなし	1963.03.03	Buichi Saitō			
	何か面白いことないか	1963.03.03	Koreyoshi Kurahara			
Five Ronins	旗本やくざ 五人のあばれ者	1963.03.03	Shigehiro Ozawa		Jidai-geki	
	魚河岸の旋風娘	1963.03.03	Manao Horiuchi			
	次郎長社長と石松社員 安来ぶし道中	1963.03.03	Masaharu Segawa		Jidai-geki	
	若いやつ	1963.03.03	Hirokazu Ichimura			
Hitokiri Ichiba	人斬り市場	1963.03.08	Masateru Nishiyama		Jidai-geki	
	傷だらけの不適者	1963.03.09	Setsuya Kondō			
The Violent Underworld	暴力街	1963.03.09	Tsuneo Kobayashi		Yakuza	
	若旦那日本晴れ	1963.03.13	Ryōichi Yamanouchi			
	黒の札束	1963.03.15	Mitsuo Murayama			
New Tale of Zatoichi	新・座頭市物語	1963.03.15	Tokuzo Tanaka	Shintaro Katsu, Mikiko Tsubouchi, Seizaburo Kawazu	Jidai-geki / Chambara	
	あの人はいま	1963.03.16	Hideo Ōba			
	危ない橋は渡りたい	1963.03.16	Mitsuo Yagi			
Theater of Life: Hishakaku	人生劇場 飛車角	1963.03.16	Tadashi Sawashima		Yakuza	
	東京アンタッチャブル 脱走	1963.03.16	Hideo Sekikawa			
	雨の中に消えて	1963.03.17	Katsumi Nishikawa			
Bad Girl	非行少女	1963.03.17	Kirio Urayama			
	わんぱく王子の大蛇退治	1963.03.24	Yūgo Serikawa			
	日本一物語	1963.03.24	Yoshitama Imaizumi			
	つむじ風	1963.03.24	Noboru Nakamura			
Cases of Denshichi: The Lady Fox	伝七捕物帖 女狐小判	1963.03.24	Hideaki Ōnishi		Jidai-geki	
	二人だけの砦	1963.03.24	Minoru Shibuya			
Castle of Owls	忍者秘帖 梟の城	1963.03.24	Eiichi Kudō		Jidai-geki / Ninja	
Kureejii sakusen-Sentei hissho	クレージー作戦 先手必勝	1963.03.24	Seiji Hisamatsu	The Crazy Cats, Junko Ikeuchi, Mie Nakao	Comedy	
Warring Clans	戦国野郎	1963.03.24	Kihachi Okamoto	Yūzō Kayama, Makoto Sato, Yuriko Hoshi	Jidai-geki / Ninja	
	どん底だって平っちゃらさ	1963.03.27	Kenjirō Morinaga			
	38年大相撲大阪場所 大鵬の宿願に挑む五大関の闘志	1963.03.31	Torahiko Ise [composition]			
	機動捜査班 警視十三号応答なし	1963.03.31	Isamu Kosugi			
	女系家族	1963.03.31	Kenji Misumi			
A Vagabond of Gale	中仙道のつむじ風	1963.03.31	Sadatsugu Matsuda		Jidai-geki	
	特別機動捜査隊	1963.03.31	Kōji Ōta			
	夜の勲章	1963.03.31	Akinori Matsuo			
	嘘	1963.03.31	Yasuzō Masumura, Kōzaburō Yoshimura, Teinosuke Kinugasa			
	スター誕生	1963.04.06	Kinya Sakai			
	河内の風より あばれ太鼓	1963.04.06	Tatsuo Sakai			
	海道一の鬼紳士	1963.04.06	Yūsuke Watanabe			
Road in the Mist	夜霧の上州路	1963.04.06	Kōkichi Uchide		Jidai-geki	
	俺の背中に陽が当たる	1963.04.07	Kō Nakahira			
Kigeki Tonkatsu ichidai	喜劇 とんかつ一代	1963.04.10	Yuzo Kawashima	Hisaya Morishige, Chikage Awashima, Reiko Dan		
Pressure of Guilt	白と黒	1963.04.10	Hiromichi Horikawa	Keiju Kobayashi, Tatsuya Nakadai, Chikage Awashima	Drama	
	こまどり姉妹 未練ごころ	1963.04.12	Masamitsu Igayama			
The Last Boss	最後の顔役	1963.04.12	Yasushi Sasaki		Yakuza	
	アカシアの雨がやむとき	1963.04.14	Ren Yoshimura			
	その結婚異議あり	1963.04.14	Toshirō Ōmi			
	七人の刑事 女を探がせ	1963.04.14	Osamu Takahashi			
	若い樹々	1963.04.14	Haruo Harada			
	川っ風野郎たち	1963.04.14	Mitsuo Wakasugi			
	下町の太陽	1963.04.18	Yōji Yamada			
This Head is Wanted for 10,000 Goku	この首一万石	1963.04.21	Daisuke Itō		Jidai-geki	
The Judo Generation	柔道一代	1963.04.21	Kiyoshi Saeki			
	夜の配当	1963.04.21	Shigeo Tanaka			
The Third Shadow	第三の影武者	1963.04.21	Umetsugu Inoue		Jidai-geki	
Kawachi udoki-Oiroke hanjoki	河内風土記 おいろけ繁盛記	1963.04.21	Kozo Saeki	Frankie Sakai, Eitarō Shindō, Junko Ikeuchi		
Youth of the Beast	野獣の青春	1963.04.21	Seijun Suzuki	Joe Shishido, Nobuo Kaneko, Tomio Aoki	Yakuza	
	腰抜けガン・ファイター	1963.04.24	Hiroshi Noguchi			
	性の変則	1963.04.25	Satoru Kobayashi			
	俺は地獄の部隊長	1963.04.28	Takumi Furukawa			
	太陽への脱出	1963.04.28	Toshio Masuda			
	独立美人隊	1963.04.28	Hirokazu Ichimura			
	拝啓天皇陛下様	1963.04.28	Yoshitarō Nomura			
	無法松の一生	1963.04.28	Shinji Murayama		Jidai-geki	
Bad Reputation in the Marketplace	悪名市場	1963.04.28	Kazuo Mori		Yakuza	
Bushido, Samurai Saga	武士道残酷物語	1963.04.28	Tadashi Imai	Yoshiko Mita, Kyōko Kishida, Ineko Arima	Jidai-geki	
Legacy of the 500,000	五十万人の遺産	1963.04.28	Toshirō Mifune	Toshirō Mifune, Tatsuya Mihashi, Tsutomu Yamazaki	Adventure	
Shacho gaiyuki	社長外遊記	1963.04.28	Shue Matsubayashi	Hisaya Morishige, Keiju Kobayashi, Norihei Miki	Comedy	
	赤い水	1963.05.03	Satsuo Yamamoto			
A Sword of Solitude	狐雁一刀流	1963.05.08	Shōji Matsumura		Jidai-geki	
	結婚の条件	1963.05.12	Buichi Saitō			
Bloody Record of the Shinsengumi	新選組血風録 近藤勇	1963.05.12	Shigehiro Ozawa		Jidai-geki	
	青春を返せ	1963.05.12	Motomu Ida			
	特別機動捜査隊 東京駅に張り込め	1963.05.12	Kōji Ōta			
	温泉あんま	1963.05.15	Keigo Kimura			
Return of the Samurai	残酷の河	1963.05.15	Seiichirō Uchikawa		Jidai-geki	
Ano ko ni kofuku o	あの娘に幸福を	1963.05.15	Tetsuhiro Kawasaki	Kenji Mine, Mie Hama, Hiroko Minami	Comedy	
Women... Oh, Women!	日本の夜 女・女・女物語	1963.05.15	Tetsuji Takechi		Pink	
Edo Ninja Scroll: Seven Shadows	江戸忍法帖 七つの影	1963.05.19	Junji Kurata		Jidai-geki / Ninja	
	殺人鬼の誘惑	1963.05.19	Eijirō Wakabayashi			
	赤い靴とろくでなし	1963.05.19	Yōichi Ushihara			
	熱いうめき	1963.05.21	Akira Miwa			
	江戸無情	1963.05.22	Masateru Nishiyama			
	写真記者物語 瞬間に命を賭けろ	1963.05.22	Takashi Tsuboshima			
Tsuma toiu na no onna tachi	妻という名の女たち	1963.05.22	Masanori Kakei	Yoko Tsukasa, Sachiko Hidari, Reiko Dan		
Theater of Life: Hishakaku 2	人生劇場 続飛車角	1963.05.25	Tadashi Sawashima		Yakuza	
Yagyu Chronicles 6: The Yagyu Scroll	柳生武芸帳 片目水月の剣	1963.05.25	Yasuto Hasegawa		Jidai-geki / Ninja	
	38年大相撲夏場所 前半戦	1963.05.26	Torahiko Ise [composition]			
	交換日記	1963.05.26	Kenjirō Morinaga			
Teuchi	手討	1963.05.29	Tokuzō Tanaka		Jidai-geki	
	青島要塞爆撃命令	1963.05.29	Kengo Furusawa			
	続社長外遊記	1963.05.29	Shūe Matsubayashi			
Showdown	対決	1963.05.29	Kimiyoshi Yasuda		Jidai-geki	
	ちゃらんぽらん物語	1963.06.01	Manao Horiuchi			
	38年大相撲夏場所 後半戦	1963.06.02	Torahiko Ise [composition]			
	怪談異人幽霊	1963.06.02	Satoru Kobayashi			
	伊豆の踊子	1963.06.02	Katsumi Nishikawa			
	銀座の次郎長	1963.06.02	Motomu Ida			
Sasuke and his Comedians	真田風雲録	1963.06.02	Tai Katō		Jidai-geki / Ninja	
	恋は神代の昔から	1963.06.02	Masamitsu Igayama			
	わたしを深く埋めて	1963.06.08	Umetsugu Inoue			
	黒の死球	1963.06.08	Shunkai Mizuho			
	てなもんや三度笠	1963.06.09	Kōkichi Uchide		Jidai-geki	
	民謡の旅 秋田おばこ	1963.06.09	Kunio Watanabe			
	花の咲く家	1963.06.13	Yoshiaki Banshō			
	島育ち	1963.06.13	Mitsuo Yagi			
	警視庁物語 全国縦断捜査	1963.06.14	Masuichi Iizuka			
	陸軍残虐物語	1963.06.14	Junya Satō			
	イチかバチか	1963.06.16	Yūzō Kawashima			
	機動捜査班 静かなる暴力	1963.06.16	Isamu Kosugi			
	午前零時の出獄	1963.06.16	Tokujirō Yamazaki			
	台所太平記	1963.06.16	Shirō Toyoda			
	女のはらわた	1963.06.18	Sōjirō Motoki			
	日本残酷物語	1963.06.22	Nobuo Nakagawa, Kiyoshi Komori, Ten Takahashi			
Bosu o Taose	親分を倒せ	1963.06.22	Teruo Ishii			
Three Outlaws	用心棒市場	1963.06.22	Shigehiro Ozawa		Jidai-geki	
	煙の王様	1963.06.23	Hiromi Higuchi			
Ghost Story of Devil's Fire Swamp	怪談鬼火の沼	1963.06.23	Bin Kato		Jidai-geki	
	囁く死美人	1963.06.23	Mitsuo Murayama			
	女犯の掟	1963.06.25	Satoru Kobayashi			
	ローマに咲いた恋	1963.06.29	Yoshirō Kawazu			
	二人で胸を張れ	1963.06.29	Kinya Sakai			
Tenya Wanya Jirocho Dochu	てんやわんや次郎長道中	1963.06.30	Kazuo Mori		Jidai-geki	
	ホノルル・東京・香港 HONOLULU-TOKYO-HONGKONG	1963.06.30	Yasuki Chiba			
Case of Umon: The Woman in the Parasol	右門捕物帖 蛇の目傘の女	1963.06.30	Toshikazu Kōno		Jidai-geki	
	視界ゼロの脱出	1963.06.30	Tetsutarō Murano			
	若い仲間たち うちら祇園お舞妓はん	1963.06.30	Kōzō Saeki			
Gambler Tales of Hasshu: A Man's Pledge	八州遊侠伝 男の盃	1963.06.30	Masahiro Makino		Jidai-geki	
	夜霧のブルース	1963.06.30	Takashi Nomura			
	喜劇 新婚の悶え	1963.07.02	Kensuke Sawa			
	性科入門	1963.07.02				
	警視庁物語 十代の足どり	1963.07.07	Hajime Satō			
Seventeen Ninja	十七人の忍者	1963.07.07	Yasuto Hasegawa		Jidai-geki / Ninja	
	探偵事務所23 銭と女に弱い男	1963.07.07	Nozomu Yanase			
Greatest War in the Underworld	暗黒街最大の決闘	1963.07.13	Umetsugu Inoue		Yakuza	
	喜劇 駅前茶釜	1963.07.13	Seiji Hisamatsu			
	結婚式・結婚式	1963.07.13	Noboru Nakamura			
Rabble Tactics	雑兵物語	1963.07.13	Kazuo Ikehiro		Jidai-geki	
	女弥次喜多 タッチ旅行	1963.07.13	Tsutomu Kamimura			
	日本一の色男	1963.07.13	Kengo Furusawa			
	風速七十五米	1963.07.13	Shigeo Tanaka			
Shingo's Challenge Part III	新吾二十番勝負 完結篇	1963.07.13	Sadatsugu Matsuda		Jidai-geki	
	38年大相撲名古屋場所 大鵬七連覇に挑む5大関	1963.07.14	Torahiko Ise [composition]			
	若い東京の屋根の下	1963.07.14	Buichi Saitō			
The Crest of a Man	男の紋章	1963.07.14	Akinori Matsuo		Yakuza	
Kagemaru of the Iga Clan	伊賀の影丸	1963.07.24	Noboru Ono		Jidai-geki / Ninja	
Gurentai Junjōha	ぐれん隊純情派	1963.07.27	Yasuzō Masumura			
	温泉女中	1963.07.27	Shunkai Mizuho			
	舞妓はん	1963.07.27	Hirokazu Ichimura			
	あの橋の畔で 完結篇	1963.07.27	Yoshitarō Nomura			
	日本の戦争	1963.07.28				
	現代っ子	1963.07.28	Kō Nakahira			
	続雲の上団五郎一座	1963.07.28	Nobuo Aoyagi			
	独立機関銃隊未だ射撃中	1963.07.28	Senkichi Taniguchi			
	闘魂こめて 読売巨人軍創立三十周年記念映画	1963.07.30	Noboru Sakamaki			
Gang Alliance	ギャング同盟	1963.07.31	Kinji Fukasaku		Yakuza	
The Chivalrous of Asakusa	浅草の侠客	1963.07.31	Kiyoshi Saeki			
Violent Gang	暴力団	1963.08.07	Shigehiro Ozawa		Yakuza	
Yagyu Chronicles 7: The Cloud of Disorder	柳生武芸帳 剣豪乱れ雲	1963.08.07	Kōkichi Uchide		Jidai-geki / Ninja	
Shinobi no Mono 2: Vengeance	続・忍びの者	1963.08.10	Satsuo Yamamoto		Jidai-geki / Ninja	
Zatoichi the Fugitive	座頭市兇状旅	1963.08.10	Tokuzo Tanaka	Shintaro Katsu, Miwa Takada, Masayao Banri	Jidai-geki / Chambara	
	ハワイの若大将	1963.08.11	Jun Fukuda			
	関東遊侠伝	1963.08.11	Akinori Matsuo			
	死闘の伝説	1963.08.11	Keisuke Kinoshita			
	真赤な恋の物語	1963.08.11	Umetsugu Inoue			
	美しい暦	1963.08.11	Kenjirō Morinaga			
Matango	マタンゴ	1963.08.11	Ishirō Honda	Akira Kubo, Kumi Mizuno, Kenji Sahara	Horror	
Miyamoto Musashi III: Enlightenment to the Two Sword Style	宮本武蔵 二刀流開眼	1963.08.14	Tomu Uchida		Jidai-geki	
	馬喰一代	1963.08.14	Masaharu Segawa			
	アリバイ	1963.08.25	Yōichi Ushihara			
	霧子のタンゴ	1963.08.25	Eisuke Takizawa			
	林檎の花咲く町	1963.08.25	Katsuki Iwauchi			
Kumokiri Gokumon-cho	雲切獄門帖	1963.08.27	Yasushi Sasaki		Jidai-geki	
Cases of A Masterlesss Samurai	素浪人捕物帖 闇夜に消えた女	1963.08.27	Kinnosuke Fukada		Jidai-geki	
	仮面の情事	1963.08.28	Takeo Takagi			
	ニッポン珍商売	1963.08.28	Kinya Sakai			
	女が愛して憎むとき	1963.08.28	Sōkichi Tomimoto			
	男の嵐	1963.08.28	Nobuo Nakagawa			
The Apprentice Geisha and The Assassin	舞妓と暗殺者	1963.08.28	Kenji Misumi		Jidai-geki	
	エデンの海	1963.08.31	Katsumi Nishikawa			
	海軍	1963.08.31	Shinji Murayama			
	九ちゃん刀を抜いて	1963.08.31	Masahiro Makino			
Kokusai himitsu keisatsu shirei dai 8-gō	国際秘密警察 指令第8号	1963.08.31	Toshio Sugie			
Young Swordsman	秘剣	1963.08.31	Hiroshi Inagaki		Jidai-geki	
	風が呼んでる旋風児 銀座無頼帖	1963.08.31	Hiroshi Noguchi			
	甘い罠	1963.09.03	Kōji Wakamatsu			
	黒の商標	1963.09.07	Tarō Yuge			
Bad Reputation on the Warf	悪名波止場	1963.09.07	Kazuo Mori		Yakuza	
Yakuza's Song	やくざの歌	1963.09.08	Miki Wakabayashi		Yakuza	
River Washes Away The Moon	残月大川流し	1963.09.08	Yasushi Sasaki		Jidai-geki	
	あらくれ荒野	1963.09.11	Tatsuo Sakai			
	丘は花ざかり	1963.09.11	Kiyoshi Horiike			
	虎の子作戦	1963.09.11	Nozomu Yanase			
	嵐を呼ぶ十八人	1963.09.11	Yoshishige Yoshida			
Ore Wa Samurai Da! Inochi o Kakeru Sannin	おれは侍だ！ 命を賭ける三人	1963.09.14	Tadashi Sawashima		Jidai-geki	
	わんぱく天使	1963.09.14	Seiji Hisamatsu			
Kyokatsu	恐喝	1963.09.14	Yūsuke Watanabe			
	丼池	1963.09.14	Seiji Hisamatsu			
	ただれた太陽	1963.09.15	Toshio Kitazato			
	芽をふく子ども	1963.09.16	Isao Hara			
	100万人の娘たち	1963.09.20	Heinosuke Gosho			
	虹をつかむ踊子	1963.09.20	Tsuneo Tabata			
	38年大相撲秋場所 前半戦	1963.09.21	Torahiko Ise [composition]			
	パレンバン奇襲作戦	1963.09.21	Tsuneo Kobayashi			
	温泉巡査	1963.09.21	Haruo Harada			
Young Lord Yakuza: Edo Tengu	若様やくざ 江戸っ子天狗	1963.09.21	Eiichi Kudō		Jidai-geki	
	波浮の港	1963.09.21	Buichi Saitō			
	末は博士か大臣か	1963.09.21	Kōji Shima			
The Bastard	悪太郎	1963.09.21	Seijun Suzuki	Ken Yamanouchi, Masako Isumi, Hiharu Kuri	Crime	
Jerry's Mori no Ishimatsu	ジェリーの森の石松	1963.09.29	Setsuya Kondō		Jidai-geki	
	のら犬作戦	1963.09.29	Jun Fukuda			
Blind Wolf	めくら狼	1963.09.29	Hideaki Ōnishi			
	銀座の次郎長 天下の一大事	1963.09.29	Motomu Ida			
	太陽は呼んでいる	1963.09.29	Eizō Sugawa			
	激しい女たち	1963.10.01	Kōji Wakamatsu			
	地下鉄のメロディー	1963.10.__				
	$5の情欲	1963.10.__	Satoru Kobayashi			
	おいろけ作戦 プレーガール	1963.10.__	Kōji Wakamatsu			
	おいろけ作戦 プレーボーイ	1963.10.__	Kōe Shindō			
	情欲の洞窟	1963.10.__	Kōji Seki			
	38年大相撲秋場所 後半戦	1963.10.02	Torahiko Ise [composition]			
Okami no Oji	狼の王子	1963.10.04	Toshio Masuda		Yakuza	
Sword of Wind and Clouds	雲の剣風の剣	1963.10.05	Toshikazu Kōno		Jidai-geki	
	越前竹人形	1963.10.05	Kōzaburō Yoshimura			
	鏡の中の裸像	1963.10.05	Noboru Nakamura			
	港に消えたあいつ	1963.10.05	Hirokazu Ichimura			
The Sorcerer	妖僧	1963.10.05	Teinosuke Kinugasa		Jidai-geki	
Showa Kyokyaku-Den	昭和侠客伝	1963.10.05	Teruo Ishii		Yakuza	
	みれん	1963.10.12	Yasuki Chiba			
	新・夫婦善哉	1963.10.12	Shirō Toyoda			
	競輪上人行状記	1963.10.13	Shōgorō Nishimura			
Heiji Zenigata Detective Story	銭形平次捕物控	1963.10.13	Tōru Hirayama		Jidai-geki	
	続・てなもんや三度笠	1963.10.13	Kōkichi Uchide		Jidai-geki	
	遊侠無頼	1963.10.13	Haruyasu Noguchi			
	「可否道」より なんじゃもんじゃ	1963.10.17	Kazuo Inoue			
	残菊物語	1963.10.17	Hideo Ōba			
She and He	彼女と彼	1963.10.18	Susumu Hani	Sachiko Hidari, Eiji Okada, Kikuji Yamashita	Drama	
Dokonjō Ichidai	ど根性一代	1963.10.19	Kazuo Ikehiro			
Hanzai Sakusen No. 1	犯罪作戦NO．1	1963.10.19	Umetsugu Inoue			
Gang Chushingura	ギャング忠臣蔵	1963.10.20	Shigehiro Ozawa		Yakuza	
The Kingdom of Jirocho Part 1	次郎長三国志	1963.10.20	Masahiro Makino		Jidai-geki	
	クレージー作戦 くたばれ！無責任	1963.10.26	Takashi Tsuboshima			
The Lost World of Sinbad	大盗賊	1963.10.26	Senkichi Taniguchi	Toshirō Mifune, Tadao Nakamaru, Mie Hama	Jidai-geki / Tokusatsu	
	その人は遠く	1963.10.27	Kiyoshi Horiike			
Alone on the Pacific	太平洋ひとりぼっち	1963.10.27	Kon Ichikawa	Yujiro Ishihara, Shiro Osaka, Ruriko Asaoka	Adventure	
	白い熱球	1963.10.29	Kiyoshi Saeki			
Muho no Shukuba	無法の宿場	1963.10.29	Kinnosuke Fukada		Jidai-geki	
	結婚作戦業務命令	1963.10.30	Ren Yoshimura			
	示談屋	1963.10.30	Motomu Ida			
	おかしな奴	1963.11.01	Tadashi Sawashima			
	見上げてごらん夜の星を	1963.11.01	Yoshiaki Banshō			
	五番町夕霧楼	1963.11.01	Tomotaka Tasaka			
	真白き富士の嶺	1963.11.01	Kenjirō Morinaga			
	続・ニッポン珍商売	1963.11.01	Kunio Watanabe			
	成熟への階段	1963.11.__	Akira Miwa			
	巨人 大隈重信	1963.11.02	Kenji Misumi			
Sleepy Eyes of Death: The Chinese Jade	眠狂四郎殺法帖	1963.11.02	Tokuzō Tanaka		Jidai-geki	
	鎖陰	1963.11.03				
	母	1963.11.08	Kaneto Shindō			
The Kingdom of Jirocho Part 2	続・次郎長三国志	1963.11.10	Masahiro Makino		Jidai-geki	
The Crest of a Man Continues	続男の紋章	1963.11.10	Akinori Matsuo		Yakuza	
	鬼検事	1963.11.13	Hideo Sekikawa			
Kinsei-mei Shōbu Monogatari: Hana no Kōdōkan	近世名勝負物語 花の講道館	1963.11.16	Shunkai Mizuho			
	江分利満氏の優雅な生活	1963.11.16	Kihachi Okamoto			
	高校三年生	1963.11.16	Yoshio Inoue			
	女の歴史	1963.11.16	Mikio Naruse			
The Insect Woman	にっぽん昆虫記	1963.11.16	Shohei Imamura	Sachiko Hidari, Jitsuko Yoshimura, Hiroyuki Nagato	Comedy drama	
	ばりかん親分	1963.11.17	Manao Horiuchi			
Sazen Tange	丹下左膳	1963.11.17	Seiichirō Uchikawa		Jidai-geki	
Ukyonosuke On Patrol	右京之介巡察記	1963.11.20	Yasuto Hasegawa		Jidai-geki / Ninja	
Yakuza of Seki	関の弥太ッぺ	1963.11.20	Kōsaku Yamashita		Jidai-geki	
Kanto Wanderer	関東無宿	1963.11.23	Seijun Suzuki	Akira Kobayashi	Yakuza	
	われらサラリーマン	1963.11.24	Seiji Maruyama			
	東南アジアは招く	1963.11.25				
Kuro no Chūshajō	黒の駐車場	1963.11.30	Tarō Yuge			
Zatoichi on the Road	座頭市喧嘩旅	1963.11.30	Kimiyoshi Yasuda	Shintaro Katsu, Shiho Fujimura, Ryuzo Shimada	Jidai-geki / Chambara	
	38年大相撲九州場所	1963.12.01	Torahiko Ise [composition]			
	やぶにらみニッポン	1963.12.01	Hideo Suzuki			
	歌くらべ満月城	1963.12.01	Kunio Matoi			
	結婚の設計	1963.12.01	Mitsuo Yagi			
Duel of Blood and Sand	血と砂の決斗	1963.12.01	Sadatsugu Matsuda		Jidai-geki	
	続・王将	1963.12.01	Junya Satō			
	女学生の記録	1963.12.__				
	毒のある愛撫	1963.12.03	Takeo Takagi			
Waga Kyokatsu no Jinsei	わが恐喝の人生	1963.12.07	Kiyoshi Saeki			
13 Assassins	十三人の刺客	1963.12.07	Eiichi Kudo	Chiezō Kataoka, Kanjuro Arashi	Jidai-geki	
	お姐ちゃん三代記	1963.12.08	Masanori Kakei			
	暁の合唱	1963.12.08	Hideo Suzuki			
	地獄の祭典	1963.12.08	Yōichi Ushihara			
	泥だらけのいのち	1963.12.08	Kiyoshi Horiike			
	東京オリンピック音頭 恋愛特ダネ合戦	1963.12.14	Toshirō Ōmi			
	踊りたい夜	1963.12.14	Umetsugu Inoue			
	学園広場	1963.12.15	Tokujirō Yamazaki			
Moonshadow Ninja Scroll: Twenty-One Eyes	月影忍法帖 二十一の眼	1963.12.15	Junji Kurata		Jidai-geki / Ninja	
Underworld No. 1	暗黒街NO．1	1963.12.19	Shigeo Tanaka		Yakuza	
Free Lance Samurai	桃太郎侍	1963.12.19	Akira Inoue		Jidai-geki	
	わんわん忠臣蔵	1963.12.21	Daisaku Shirakawa			
	狼少年ケン	1963.12.21	Sadao Tsukioka			
	霧に消えた人	1963.12.21	Ren Yoshimura			
Yagyu Chronicles 8: The One-Eyed Ninja	柳生武芸帳 片目の忍者	1963.12.21	Shōji Matsumura		Jidai-geki / Ninja	
	香港クレージー作戦 CRAZYCATS GO TO HONGKONG	1963.12.22	Toshio Sugie			
Atragon	海底軍艦	1963.12.22	Ishirō Honda	Tadao Takashima, Yu Fujiki, Jun Tazaki	Science fiction	
	色ぼけ欲ぼけ物語	1963.12.24	Manao Horiuchi			
Mabuta no Haha Yori: Tsukiyo no Wataridori	瞼の母より 月夜の渡り鳥	1963.12.24	Hirokazu Ichimura		Jidai-geki	
	光る海	1963.12.25	Kō Nakahira			
Crest of a Man: Two Dragons	男の紋章 風雲双つ竜	1963.12.25	Akinori Matsuo		Yakuza	
	地下室のうめき	1963.12.28	Kentarō Masuda			
Shinobi no Mono 3: Resurrection	新・忍びの者	1963.12.28	Kazuo Mori		Jidai-geki / Ninja	
Bad Reputation is the Best	悪名一番	1963.12.28	Tokuzō Tanaka		Yakuza	
	悪のもだえ	1963.12.31	Kōji Wakamatsu			
	不倫のつぐない	1963.12.31	Kōji Wakamatsu			

== See also ==
- 1963 in Japan
- 1963 in Japanese television
