= Luna H. Mitani =

Japanese artist

Luna Hideki Mitani
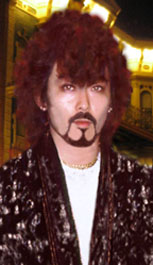
- In Los Angeles, US (2007)
- Born: December 22, 1963 (age 62); Kushiro, Hokkaidō, Japan
- Education: Dhoto University, Japan; Oregon State University, US; Amsterdam, Netherlands; Hollywood Art Center, Hollywood, US
- Known for: Painting, Drawing, Creative Director
- Notable work: 'Urban Night' 'Classic Illusion' 'Crystal Soul' 'Glory & Defeat' 'Snow Church' 'Midnight' 'Saxophone's Dream (Secret Place)' 'Saxophone's Whisper' 'Daisy Dukes' 'Midnight Conversation' 'Lovers'

Luna H. Mitani (born December 22, 1963, in Kushiro, Hokkaido, Japan) is a Japanese-American artist. He works in the fields of painting and pen & ink drawing.

After traveling through more than 33 countries in Europe including England and Ireland, Mitani began his fine art training in Amsterdam, Netherlands. Afterward, he continued traveling around the world for sketching. After completing the training, he became interested in commercial art, and moved to the US to study commercial art, while beginning his career as a professional artist for the publishers and entertainment industry. He was soon called upon to design and create LP-record, music tape and CD covers for artists such as George Benson, The Platters, Dizzy Gillespie, John Coltrane, Thad Jones, Yardbird, Chet Baker, Wayne Henderson, Dan Moretti, Coale Johnson, The Highland Project, Rue Davis, Bobby Warren, and more. His CD cover works led him to work on designing posters, magazine covers, and comprehensive packaging design.

Mitani has been featured in several exhibitions in Los Angeles, California. After that, he has received a great deal of attention in Japan for his American works and was appointed Head Advisor for the Yoyogi Animation School, the largest animation school in Japan. Mitani has been featured many times in magazines, newspapers and on television in Europe, the United States, and Japan. He resides in Hollywood, California.

== Works ==
=== Highlights ===
- 1985: Had a first exhibition in the US at Rebel Gallery in Hollywood, California.
- 1986: Had exhibitions in Hollywood, West Los Angeles, Downtown Los Angeles, Melrose, Santa Monica, Venice, Los Angeles, Beverly Hills, Studio City, and Westwood.
- Was awarded "The Best of Mask" at Mona Lovins Mask Contest.
- 1987: Created CD cover art for George Benson's "4 For An Afternoon", The Platters's "Red Sails in the Sunset", Dizzy Gillespie, John Coltrane, Thad Jones's "John, John & Jones", Yardbird's "Saxmen Bop".
- Created cover art for a monthly magazine, The Lady.
- 1988: Was awarded "The Best Artist" at Japan America Artist Society.
- 1989: Created brochure for Singapore Airlines.
- Created logo for Sun Utility Network, Inc., a solar-energy and sustainability planning company currently designing a 'GreenRoof Los Angeles' project.
- 1989–1991: Created cover art for all 36 volumes (every month for three years) for the first English/Japanese bilingual real estate magazine in the US, The Real Estate, published from Pioneer Promotion West.
- 1990: Created CD cover art for Chet Baker's "Albert's House" and Coale Johnson's "Rainbow Visions".
- Created/designed logo and marketing materials for Club Sanctuary in Hollywood.
- 1991: Created CD cover art for Dan Moretti, Highland Project, and Robinsons Family.
- 1991: Created magazine cover art for special issue "Golf & Travel" of Golf Digest.
- 1992: Created CD cover art and poster for Wayne Henderson (Crusaders) "Back to the Groove".
- Created poster for Spritzer's Albuquerque Balloon Festival.
- Was appointed Head Advisor for the Yoyogi Animation School in Japan. Had an exhibition in Tokyo, Japan, sponsored by Yoyogi Animation School.
- 1993: Created package art for all products of Computer Hardware Companies, "Reval", "Legend", and their parent company, "Cal Abco".
- Created CD cover art for Rue Davis's "I'm in love with the girl next door".
- 1994: Created CD cover art for Kon Kord Records Volume 1 "September Love" by Various Artists.
- Created CD cover art for Rue Davis's "Hard To Live Without You" by Kon Kord Records (KK-0049-S).
- Designed various products for a jazz guitarist, Richard Smith (T-shirts, Poster for his concert at Catalina Island, etc.).
- Had exhibitions in Ginza and Harajuku in Tokyo, Japan and was featured in various Japanese newspapers and magazines including "Nikkan Gendai", "Nikkan Sports", and "Mainichi Shimbun".
- Created CD cover art for Hiroshi Sato's "Hiroshi Sato Best" by Alfa Records.
- Created CD cover art for Minako Yoshida's "Minako Yoshida Best" by Alfa Records.
- Created CD cover art for Bob Belden's "Prince Jazz" by Toshiba-EMI.
- 1995: Created a product catalogue for an apparel company, Gramicci.
- Was invited to a Sprint's (currently Sprint Nextel) special event, "American Dream", and was a guest speaker of the event.
- Created CD cover art for Rue Davis's "You Are My Honey Poo"
- Created CD cover art for Southside Players's "Player's Game" by Kon Kord Records (KK-9991).
- 1996: Created package art for a computer hardware company, QPS's (canara technology, inc) CD-Drive product.
- Directed a localization/design team of Warner Entertainment Japan for creating Japanese version of DVD "Eraser (movie)" starring Arnold Schwarzenegger
- Created CD cover art for Rusty Jackson's "Those Daisy Dukes"
- Had an exhibition in Ginza, Tokyo.
- His painting was used in a Japanese TV drama, "わからない(「ない!」～鎌田敏夫原作・3つの恋の物語～)", as a part of the story (not just as a set decoration).
- Was featured in a monthly L.A. local magazine, "VOGA", in 3-page.
- 1997: Had an exhibition at Park Hotel in Hokkaidō, Japan.
- Created mural (70 meters long) for L.A. Racing Pole Position (an amusement park in Japan) and also created logo and poster for it.
- Created logo for a boxing gym opened by a former World Boxing Association Light flyweight champion, Katsuo Tokashiki (Tokashiki Boxing Gym).
- Nissin Steel (日新製鉄) (one of the biggest steel companies in Japan) introduced printable steel, and they used his paintings as model art.
- Created CD cover art for Bishop Larry Hudson's "A Tribute To Reverend James Cleveland".
- Created CD cover art for Valerie's "Where Is The Love".
- Created CD cover art for Gregg Bacon's "Secret Place".
- 1998: Was featured in a documentary TV program, "Human Gallery" (KDOC-18/UTB). This program introduce a successful/influential person in Los Angeles.
- Created CD-ROM cover art for a multimedia storybook, "Don Quixote" published by TDC Interactive.
- Was interviewed in a biweekly L.A. local magazine, "Lighthouse".
- Was interviewed & featured in a monthly L.A. local magazine, "VOGA".
- Created cover art for a magazine, "Midnight Graffiti".
- 1999: Received an honor letter from Bill Clinton, the President of the United States at the time, for many outstanding contributions to the music industry.
- Created cover art for a book 'Machigaidarake no Ashibumi Kenkouhou' published by Fukushodo, Japan
- 2000: The first limited editions (giclee prints) in the US were published by Coast to Coast publishing Inc.
- Was introduced in numerous US art magazines, such as Art Business News, Art World News, Décor, and Art Trend.
- Was introduced in music magazines such as BRE, in the basement (England), Voice (England), and Soul Express (Finland) as a CD cover artist and creative director.
- Created cover art for a book 'Teppou Kiku Ichidaiki' published by Fukushodo, Japan
- Created cover art for a book 'Kafunshou Kakumei' published by Fukushodo, Japan
- Created cover art for a book 'Ijigen Energy no Keifu' published by Fukushodo, Japan
- Created cover art for a book 'Kakutou Body no Tsukurikata' published by Fukushodo, Japan.
- Directed and designed a CD cover art for Serenade's "The Serenade Experience" released by Kon Kord Records.
- 2001: Directed and designed a CD cover art for Queen Isabella's "Loving a Married Man" released by Kon Kord Records.
- His paintings were introduced in a TV program, "Sound EX" (WOWOW), for 2-month.
- 2002: Created cover art for a book 'Kyousha Jyakusha ha Fukurahagi de Kimaru' published by Fukushodo, Japan
- Directed and designed a CD cover art for Finis Tasby's "BLUES – A Tribute to John Lee Hooker" released by Kon Kord Records.
- 2003: Directed and designed a CD cover art for Bobby Warren's "Make Me Yours" released by Kon Kord Records.
- Created CD cover art for Rue Davis's "Heaven Has Sent Me Your Love" released by Kon Kord Records.
- Directed and designed a CD cover art for Patti Sterling's "Bettin' On You" released by Kon Kord Records.
- Created CD cover art for Superior Band's "No House, No Home Without My Man" released by Kon Kord Records.
- Directed and designed a CD cover art for M. Spivey's "Booty Club" released by Kon Kord Records.
- 2004: Created cover art for a magazine, FEALY, published by Fukushodo, Japan, and also was featured in the magazine in all 13 color-page as one of the most influential artists today.
- 2005: Had an exhibition at "T's" in Shibuya, Tokyo, Japan and displayed more than 40 pieces of his limited editions.
- Was featured in a weekly magazine, "Shyukan Asahi", in all 7 color-page.
- His painting was used in a Japanese TV drama series, "愛と友情のブギウギ", aired on NHK.
- Directed and designed a CD cover art for Bobby Warren's "I Slipped Up" released by Kon Kord Records.
- Directed and designed a CD cover art for Michael Brown's "Can U Feel Me" released by Kon Kord Records.
- 2006: Directed and designed a CD cover art for Bobby Warren's "Pioneers & Legends".
- Was featured in a monthly magazine, "Wing Sapporo", in 2 color-page for 2 months.
- Directed and designed a CD cover art for The Carter Brothers' "Singing The Blues".
- His paintings were introduced at the exhibition in Dairen, China; it was a Japanese art collector's exhibition.
- 2007: Directed and designed a CD cover art for The Patterson Twins' "Take Us Higher".
- Was featured in a magazine, "Insight", in 3 color –page.
- Directed and designed a CD cover art for Harold Cagler's "Shadows Are Blue".
- 2008: Directed and designed a CD cover art for Rusty Jackson's "It Must Be Love".
- Directed and designed a CD cover art for Crystal Cooley & the Stars of Faith's "Come See About Me".
- Had exhibitions in Encino and Tarzana, Los Angeles.
- 2009: Had an exhibition in Sherman Oaks, Los Angeles.
- 2011: Directed and designed a CD cover art for Estus Patterson's "The Lord's Been Good To Me".
- Directed and designed a CD cover art for Rusty Jackson's "Baby Can I Get Some?".
- 2012: Directed and designed a CD cover art for Sammy Vee's "Come And Get Your Love".
- Renewal of logo/emblem was made due to the change of work environment.
- 2013: Directed and designed a CD cover art for Jon'Nita's "Do You Believe" (KON-9992).
- Directed and designed a CD cover art for Rue Davis's "Shake It Loose".
- 2014: Directed and designed a CD cover art for Christmas Gospel Triple Duet "Celebrating X'mas".
- Directed and designed a CD cover art for Dorothy Cage's "Music Is Soul".
- Directed and designed a CD cover art for E.Z. Patterson's "Lift Jesus Up".
- 2015: Directed and designed a CD cover art for 4 Your Glory Album 1 "Ready For Hit Return" (KON-2544).
- 2016: Directed and designed a CD cover art for Cornbread's "One Of Us Is Making Love". (KON-3888)
- Directed and designed a CD cover art for E.Z. Patterson's "I Can See Clearly".
- 2017: Directed and designed a CD cover art for E.Z. Patterson's "You're Taylor Made For Me".
- 2018: Directed and designed a CD cover art (Re-Design) for Rue Davis "Heaven Has Sent Me Your Love".
- 2019: Directed and designed a CD cover art for E.Z. Patterson's "If You Ever Change Your Mind".
- Directed and designed a CD cover art for "Blues a Tribute to John Lee Hooker".
- 2020: Directed and designed a CD cover art for Dana Elliott's "Irreplaceable" (KON-0517).
- 2023: Directed and designed a CD cover art for "September Love Volume-1/2023 version".
- 2024: Directed and designed a CD cover art for E.Z. Patterson's "Ways of Love".(KON-2020)
