= University of Niigata Prefecture =

Public university in Niigata, Japan

Coordinates: 37°55′25″N 139°07′37.5″E

- 新潟県立大学
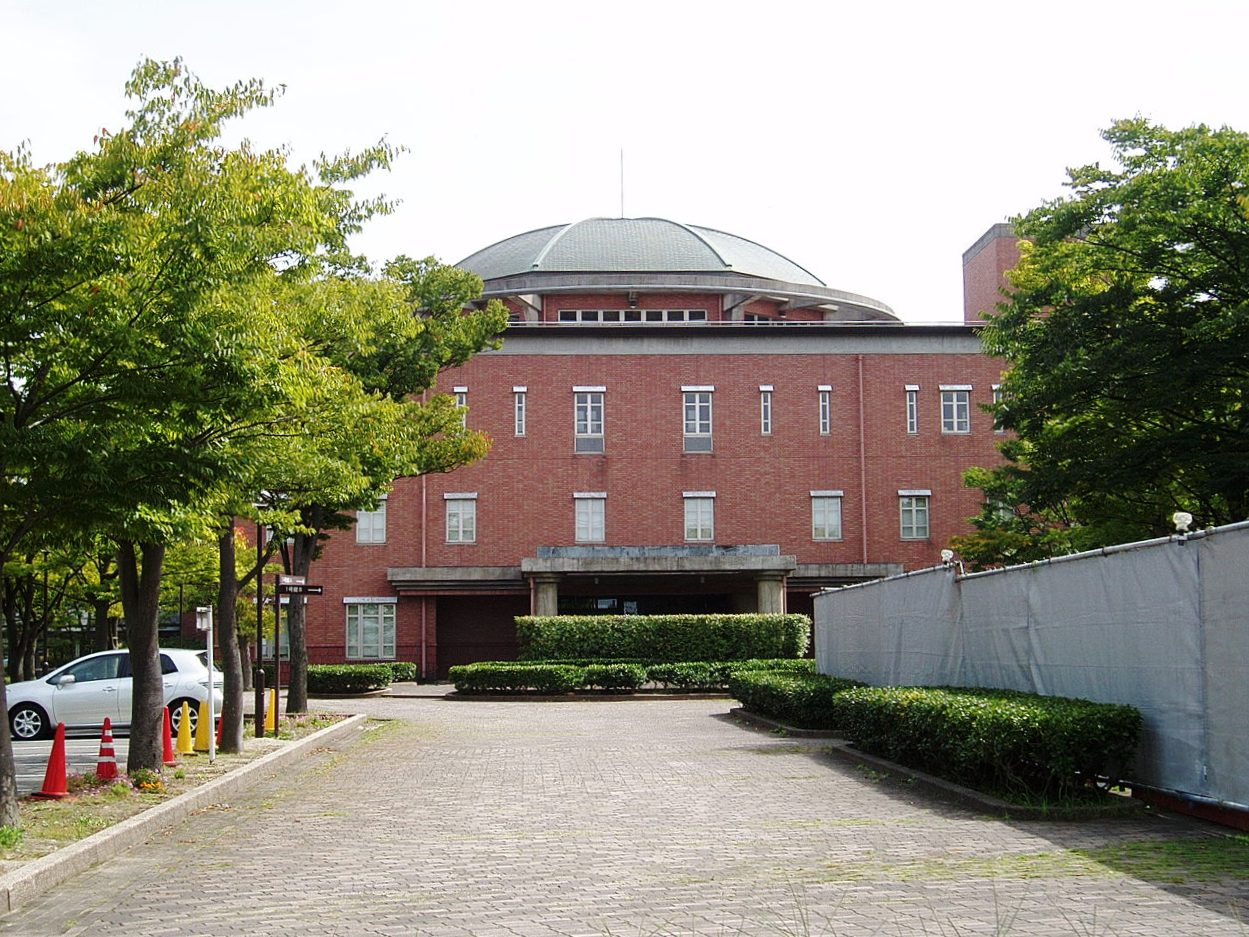
- Building #1A (Administrative office & Library)
- Type: Public
- Established: 2009
- Faculty: Full-time 79 (April 2014)
- Students: 1058 (May 2014)
- Location: Niigata, Niigata Prefecture, Japan
- Website: www.unii.ac.jp/e/

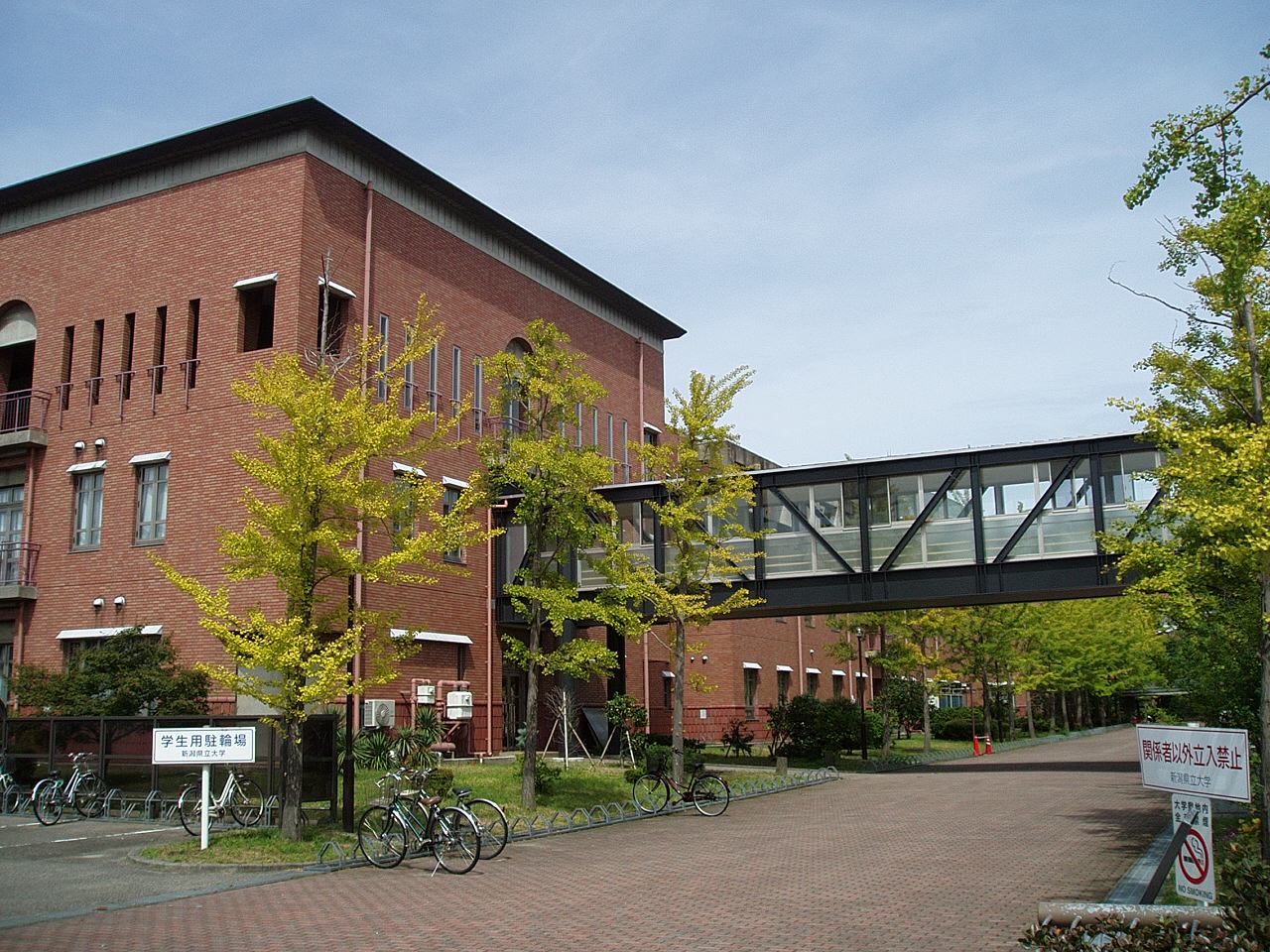
South gate

University of Niigata Prefecture (新潟県立大学, Niigata Kenritsu Daigaku) is a public university in Higashi-ku, Niigata, Niigata Prefecture, Japan. It was established in 2009 by developing Niigata Women's College (closed in March 2012) into a co-educational four-year college.

== Organization ==
=== Undergraduate schools ===
- Faculty of International Studies and Regional Development
  - Department of International Studies and Regional Development
- Faculty of Human Life Studies
  - Department of Child Studies
  - Department of Health and Nutrition

=== Graduate schools ===
- Graduate School of International Studies and Regional Development (to be opened in April 2015)
