= 1963 in Japanese television =

Events in 1963 in Japanese television.

== Events ==
- January 1: Mighty Atom, the first half-hour anime series on Japanese television, premieres on Fuji TV, and remains on the air for four consecutive years.
- January 16: Yujiro Ishihara (actor/singer), who was a signboard actor of Nikkatsu, founded an entertainment office, Ishihara Promotion (dissolved in 2021).
- January 21: Nippon Television premieres Kewpie 3-Minute Cooking (still on air as of 2021).
- February 10: With the creation of Kitakyushu City, the former NHK Kokura Station is renamed NHK Kitakyushu Station.
- April 1: Fukushima Television started broadcasting as the second-to-last VHF television station in the country.
- September 4: Fuji TV begins airing Japan's first late-night anime, Sennin Buraku.
- October 10: NHK General converts to color in Tokushima.
- November 23: In the wake of news of the assassination of American president John F. Kennedy, a satellite test between Japan and the USA was conducted using artificial satellites.
- December 16: NHK General converts to color in Kofu, Nagano, Niigata, Shizuoka, Nagoya and Oita.

== Debuts ==
| Show | Station | Premiere date | Genre | Ending date |
|---|---|---|---|---|
| 8 Man | TBS | November 7 | anime | December 31, 1964 |
| Akatsuki | NHK | April 1 | drama | April 4, 1964 |
| Galaxy Boy Troop | NHK | April 7 | anime | April 1, 1965 |
| Mighty Atom | Fuji TV | January 1 | anime | December 31, 1966 |
| Sennin Buraku | Fuji TV | September 4 | anime | February 23, 1964 |
| Tetsujin 28-go | Fuji TV | October 20 | anime | May 25, 1966 |
| Shisukon Ōji | Fuji TV | December 20 | stop motion anime | March 27, 1964 |
| The New Adventures of Pinocchio | Fuji TV | December 20 | stop motion anime | March 27, 1964 |

== See also ==
- 1963 in anime
- 1963 in Japan
- List of Japanese films of 1963
