= Mount Seppiko =

Mountain in Japan

- 雪彦山
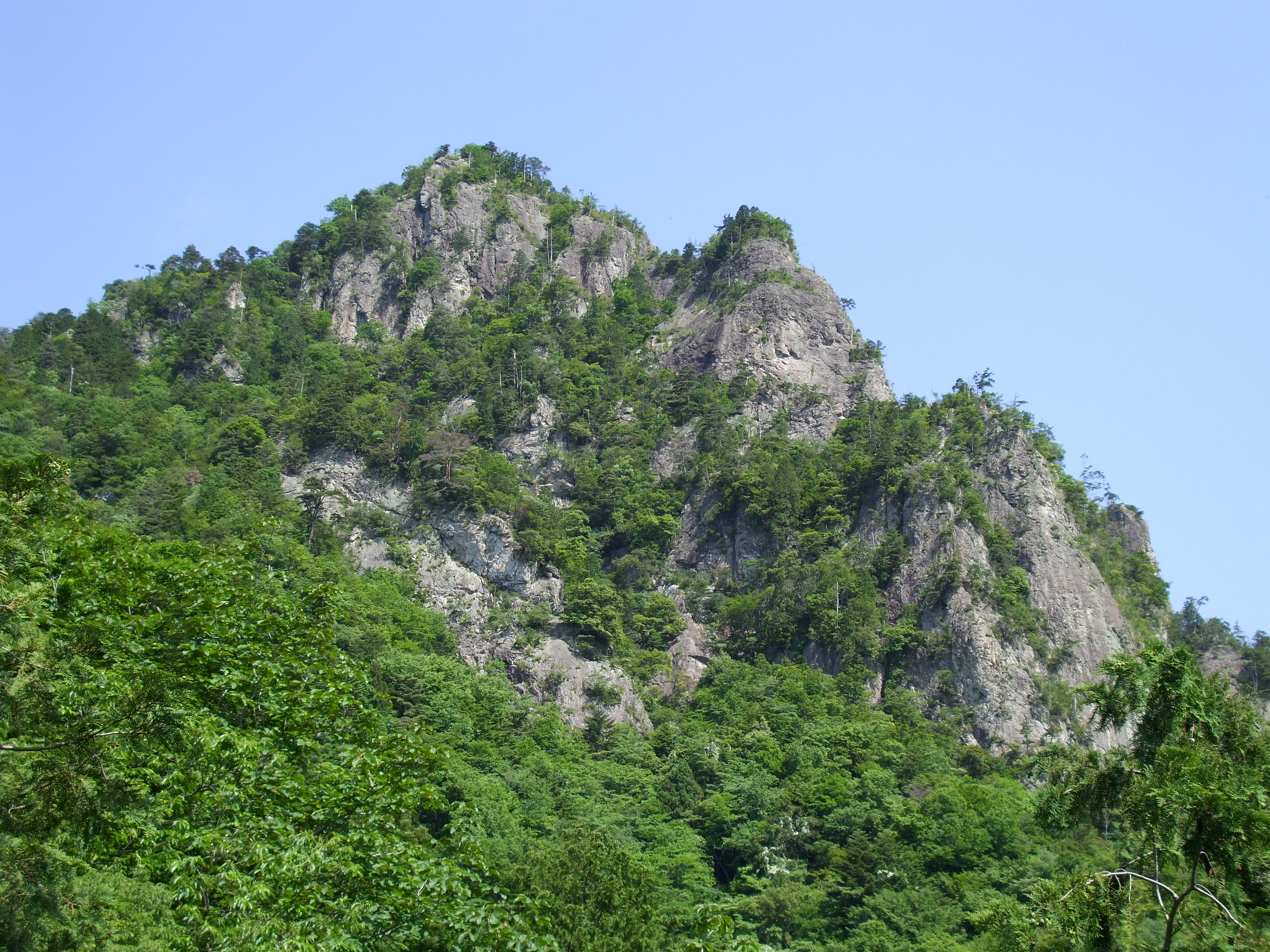
- A View of Mount Seppiko from Kaya-Jinja

Highest point
- Elevation: 915.2 m (3,003 ft)
- Listing: Hyogo 50 mountains
- Coordinates: 35°04′N 134°39′E

Naming
- Language of name: Japanese
- Pronunciation: Japanese: [seppi̥koꜜsaɴ]

Geography
- Location: Himeji, Hyōgo in Japan
- Parent range: Chūgoku Mountains

Geology
- Mountain type: Volcanic Necks

Mount Seppiko (雪彦山, Seppiko-san) is a mountain or mountains in Himeji, Hyōgo, Japan. This mountain is one of the San-hiko-san, three Hiko Shugendō mountains in Japan, and also one of Hyōgo 50 mountains, and Kinki 100 mountains. It forms part of Seppiko-Mineyama Prefectural Natural Park.

== Outline ==
There are contradicting definitions of Mount Seppiko. Yumesaki, which was merged into Himeji City in 2005, officially define Mount Seppiko as the name of a group mountains of Mount Horagatake (884m), Mount Hokotate (950m), and Mount Mitsuji (915m). However, maps of the Geographical Survey Institute of Japan show the peak of Mount Mitsuji as the peak of Mount Seppiko. Many mountain guide books write that Mount Otenjo, one of the peaks of rocky Mount Horagatake, is the default peak of the Seppiko. Other people define the Seppiko as a name of another group of mountains consisting of Mount Horagatake, Mount Hokotate, Mount Mitsuji, and Mount Myojin, Mount Nagusa.

== Religion and history ==
Mount Seppiko is a place for the ascetic practices of Shugendō in this region. According to the official history of the Kaya Jinja, a Shinto shrine in the middle of the mountain, the shrine was established in the 7th century in the time of Empress Suiko. Mount Seppiko also is considered to be developed for Shugensha, practitioners of Shugendō. Kaya Jinja was originally a typical example of Shinbutsu shūgō, literally "fusion of practices from both Shinto and Buddhism", and had a Buddhist temple, Seppiko-san Kongo Chingo-ji, just beside the Shinto shrine. However, the temple was abolished by the Shinbutsu Bunri Order, literally Shinto-Buddhism-separation Order of the Meiji Government in 1868.

Mount Seppiko is one of the mountains which still have some areas which women are prohibited from entering, in order not to disturb the training of Shugensha.

== Tourism ==
Mount Seppiko is also very famous for rock climbing. It attracts many climbers in Kansai area.

== Access ==
- Seppiko-san Bus Stop of Shinki Bus

== Gallery ==
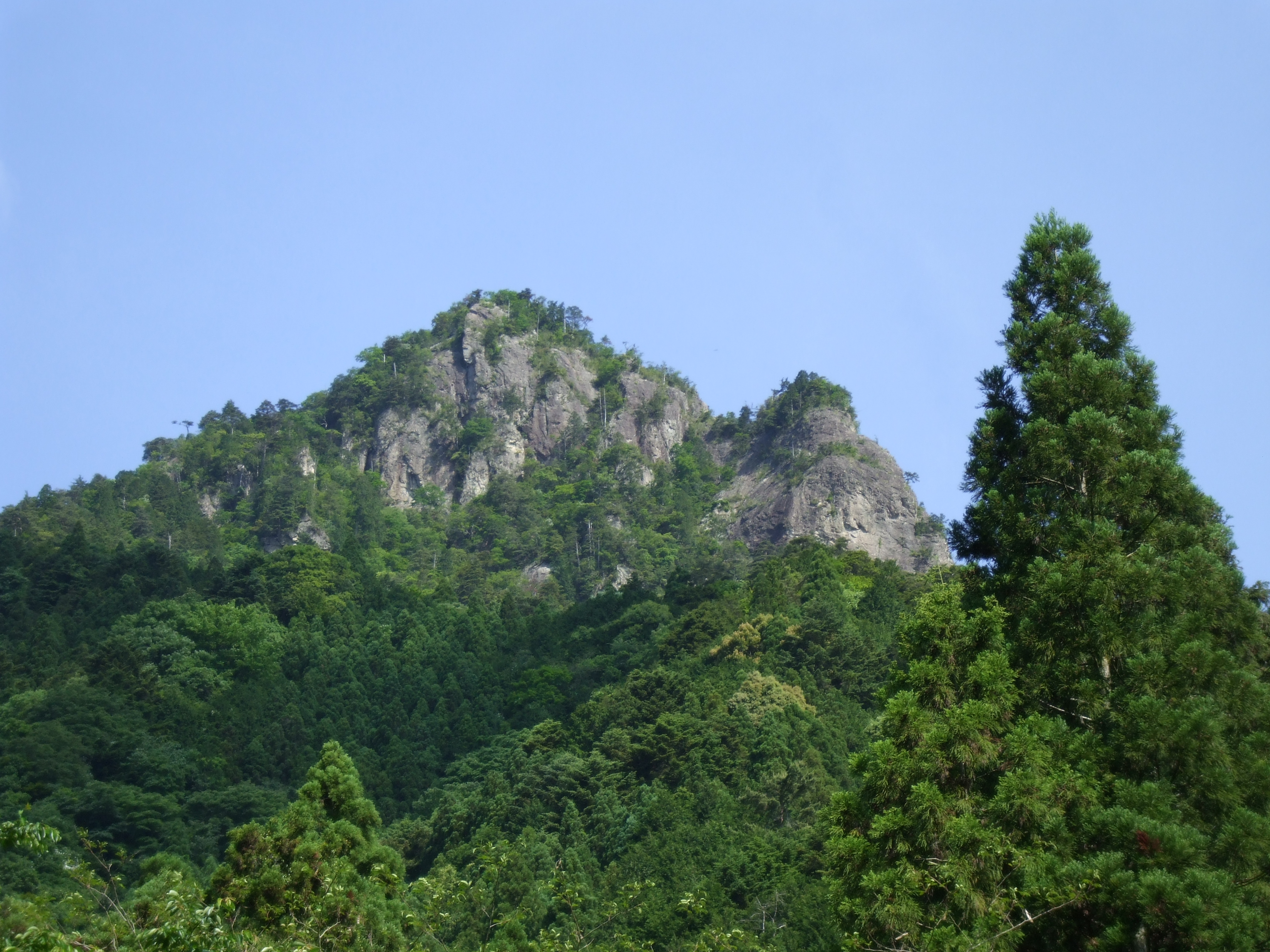
Mount Horagatake Peak

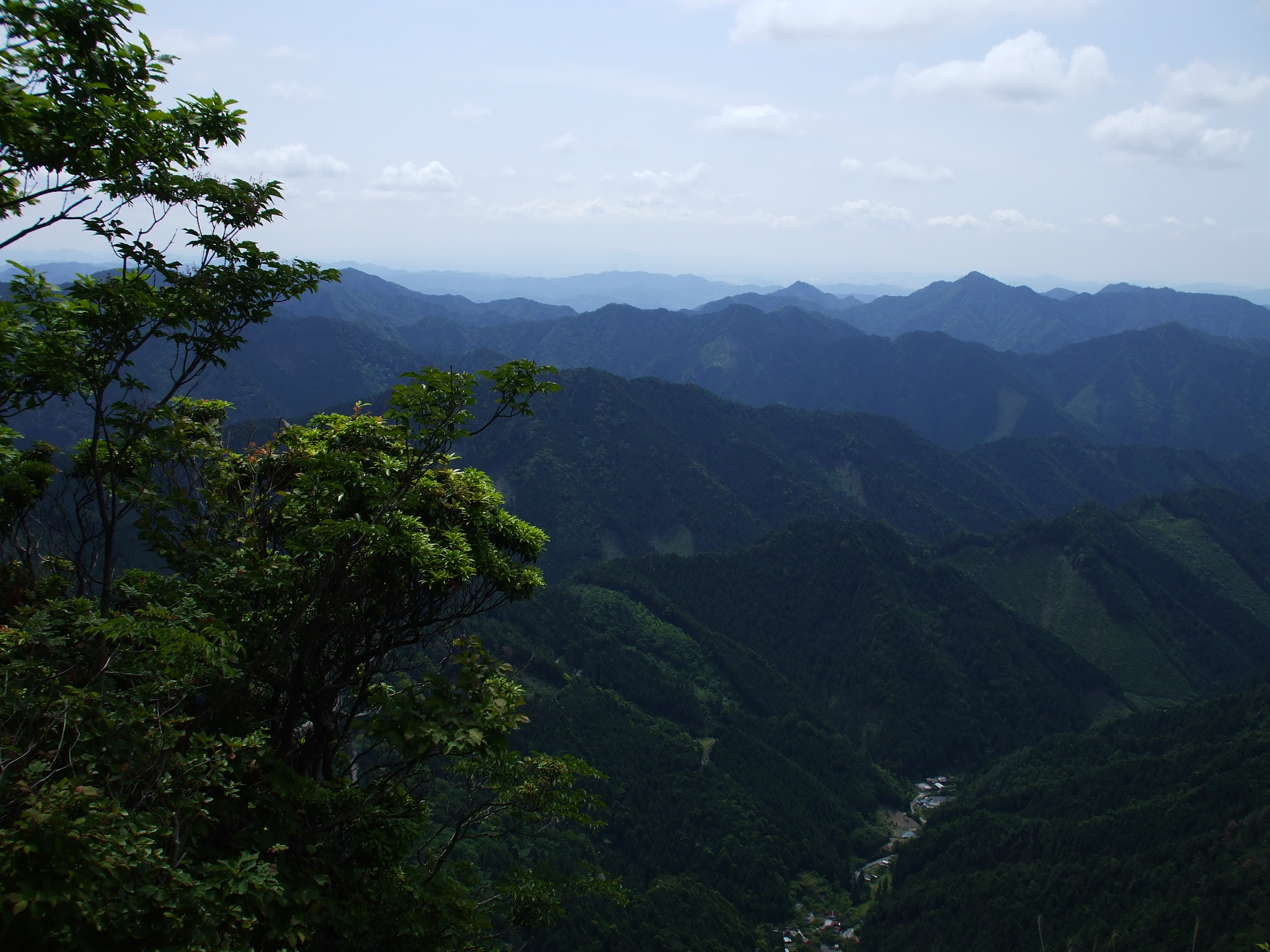
A view from Mount Horagatake Peak

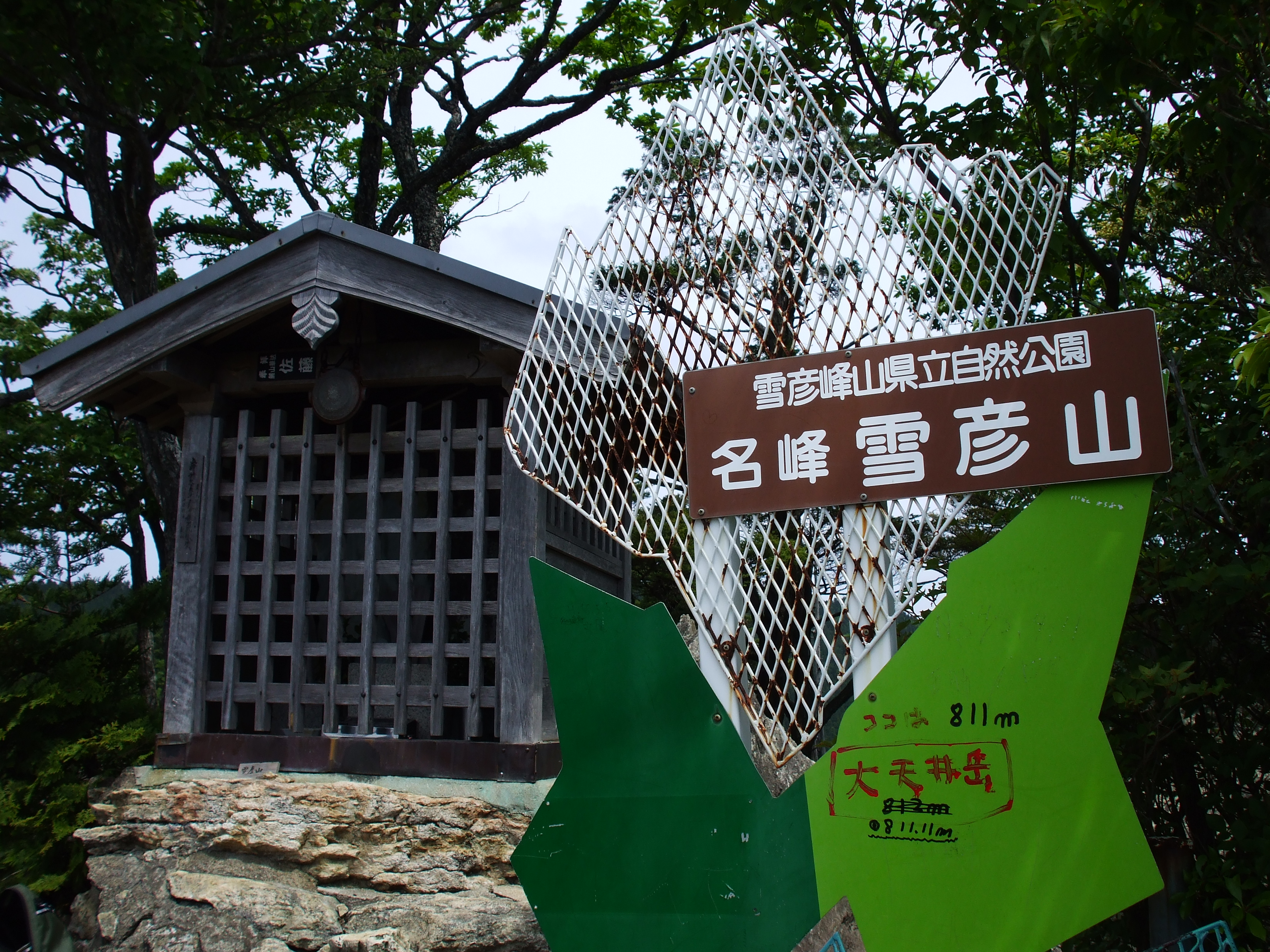
The top of Mount Horagatake Peak

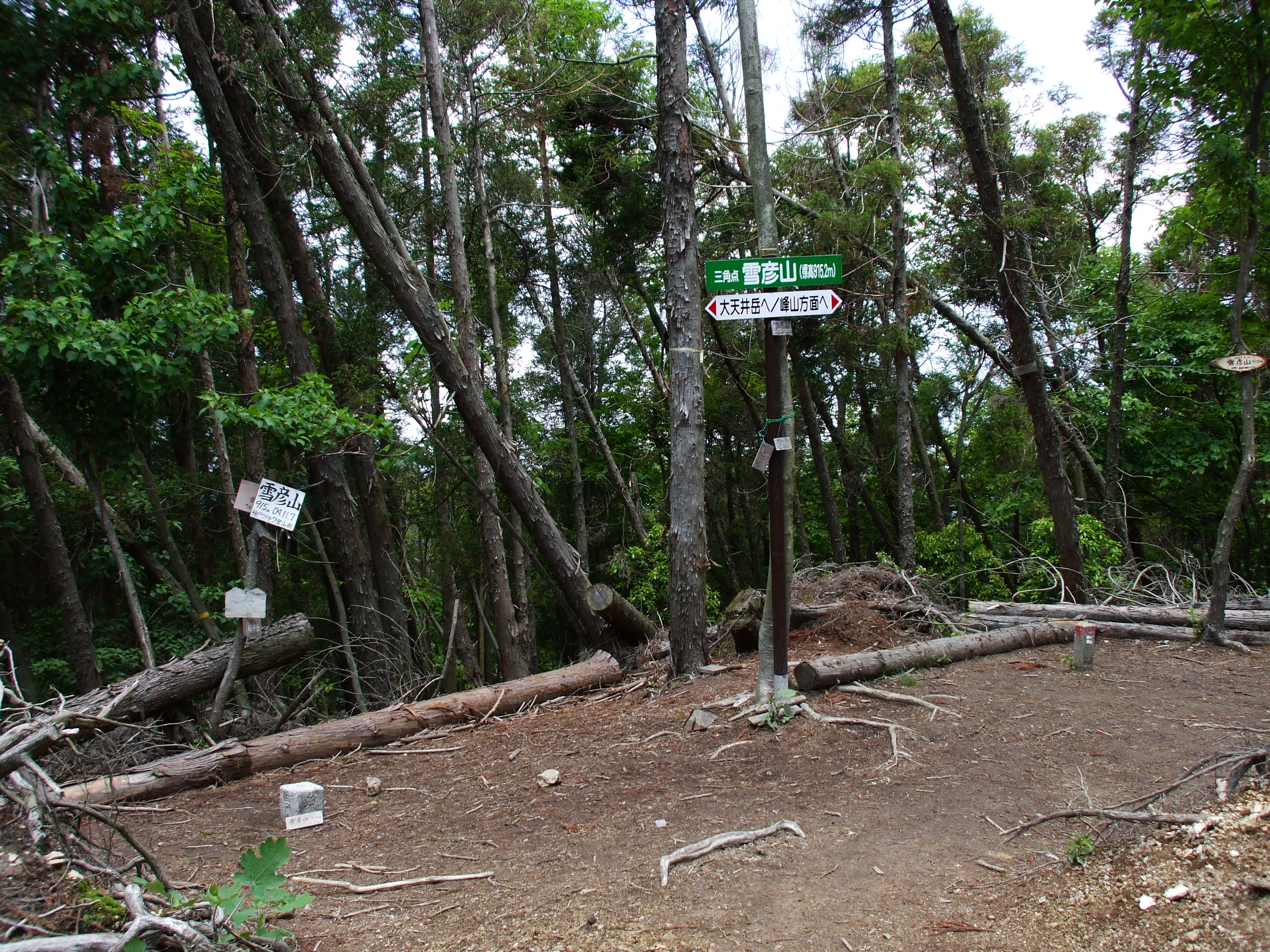
The top of Mount Mitsuji Peak

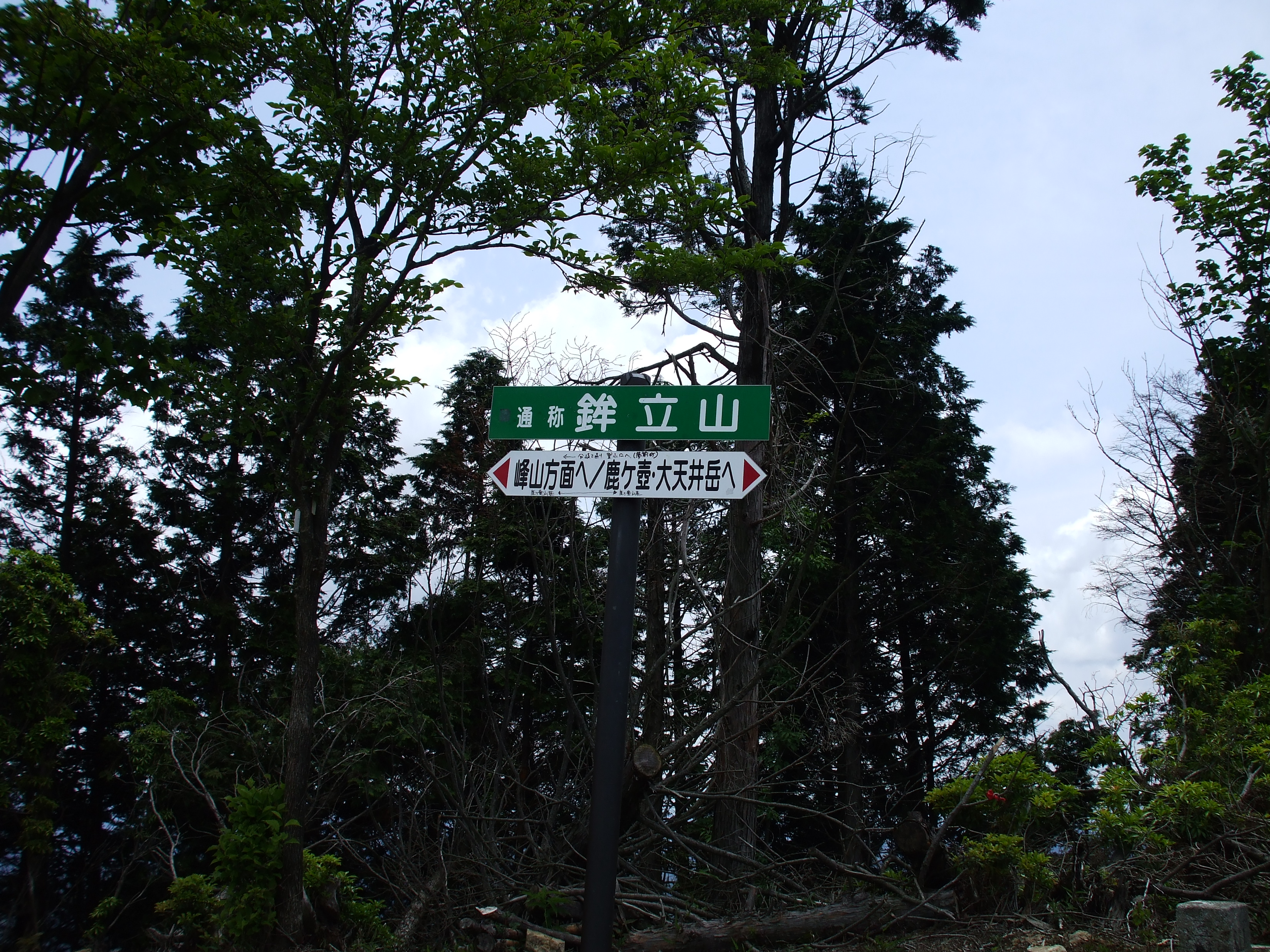
The top of Mount Hokotate Peak

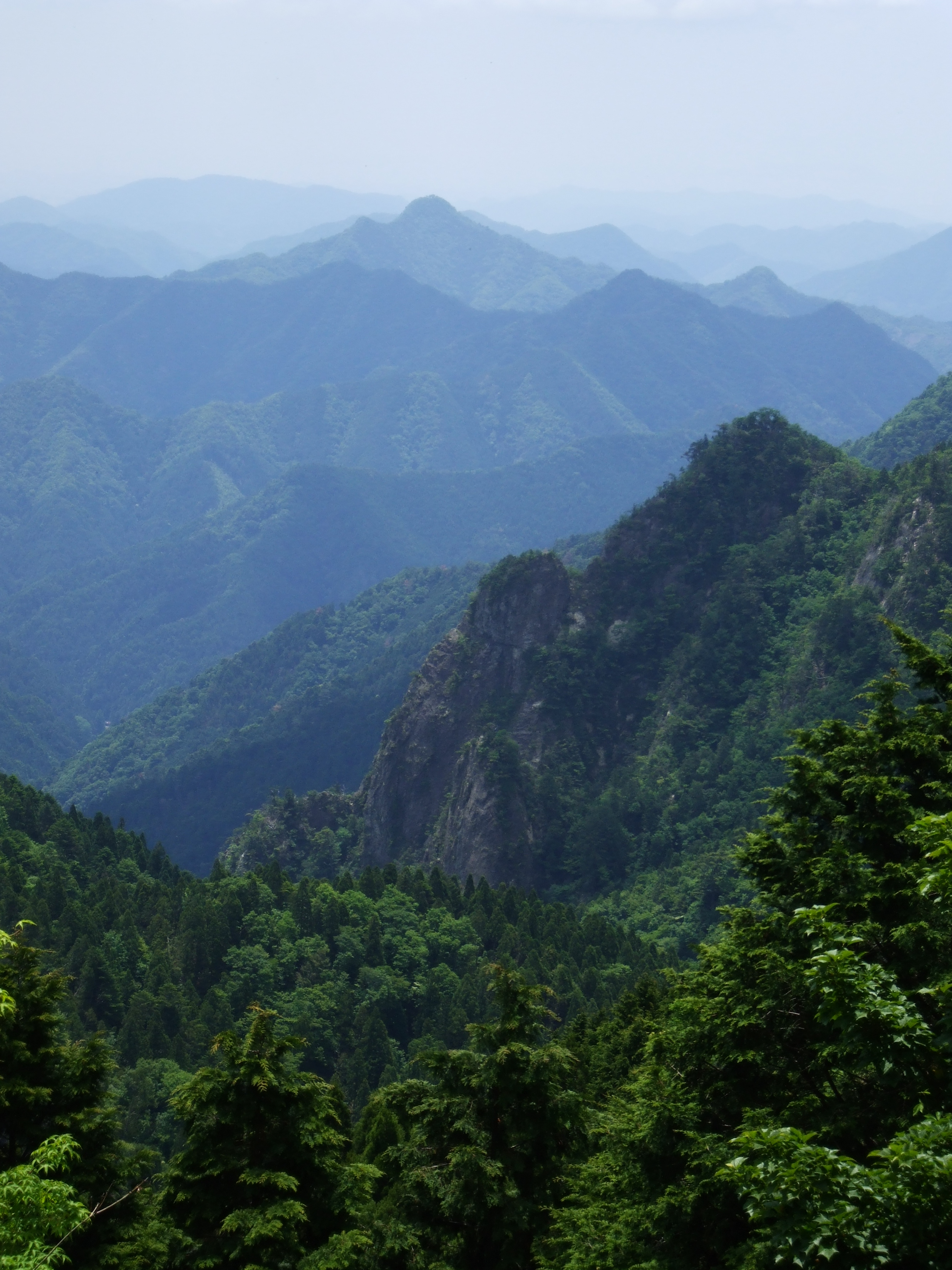
A view from Mount Hokotate Peak

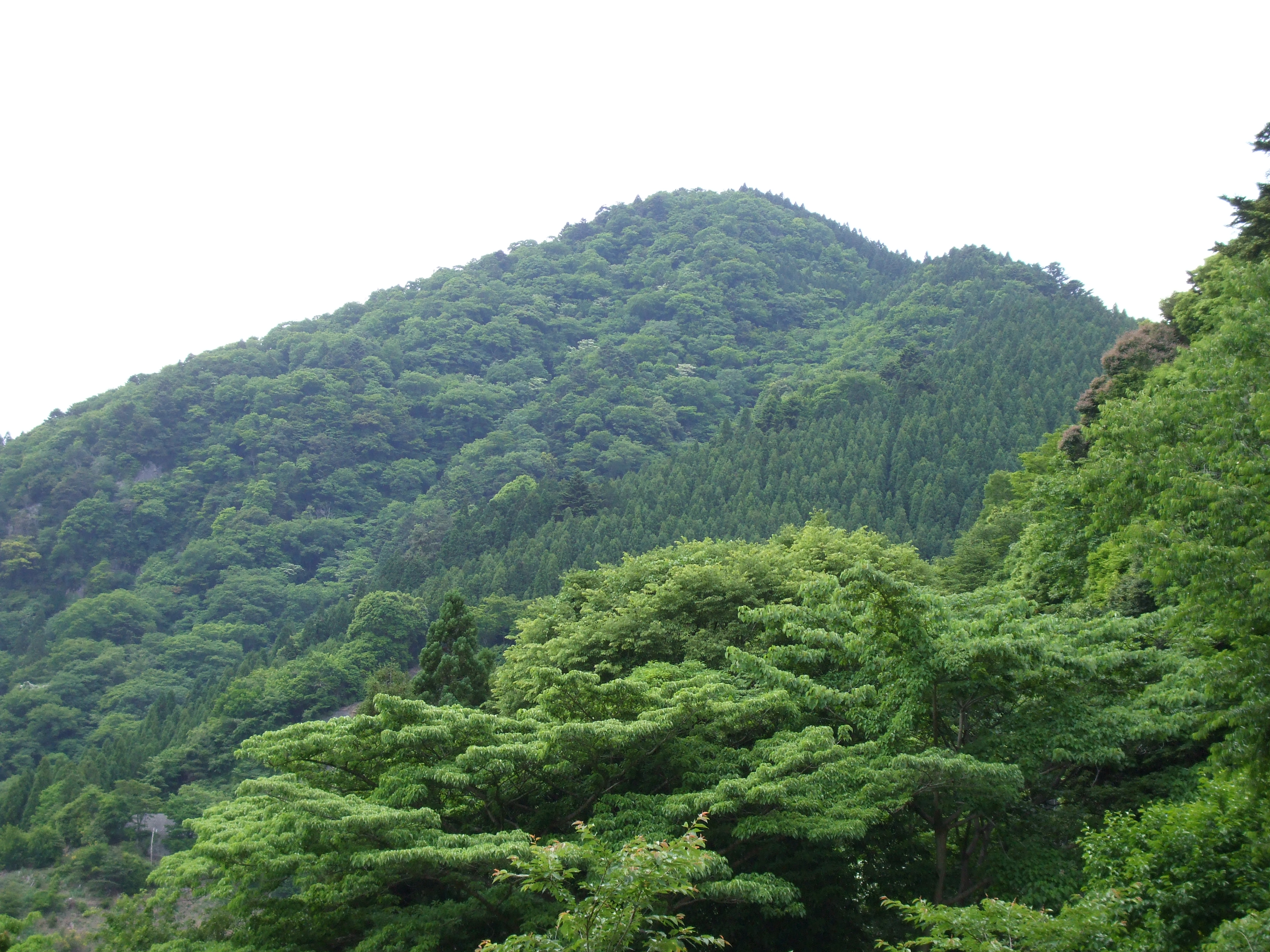
Mount Hokotate from Kaya Jinja Shinto Shrine

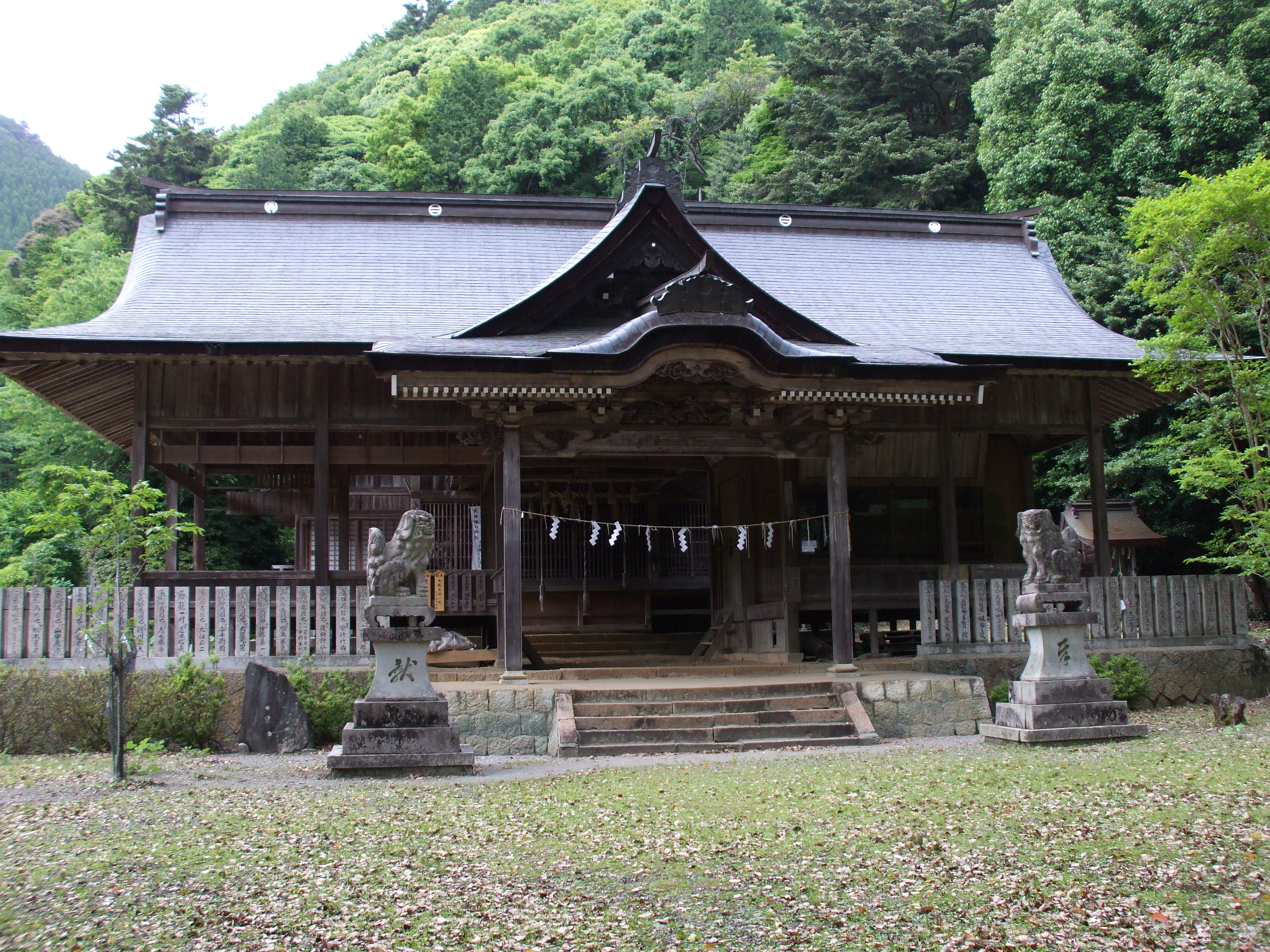
Kaya Jinja (Shinto Shrine)
