= Fukuyama City University =

Coordinates: 34°28′53.8″N 133°22′51.8″E

- 福山市立大学
- Motto: 知は明日を開く
- Motto in English: Wisdom opens up tomorrow.
- Type: Public
- Established: April 2011
- President: Takashi Inagaki
- Students: 265 (freshmen only)
- Location: Fukuyama, Hiroshima, Japan
- Campus: Urban
- Website: www.fcu.ac.jp

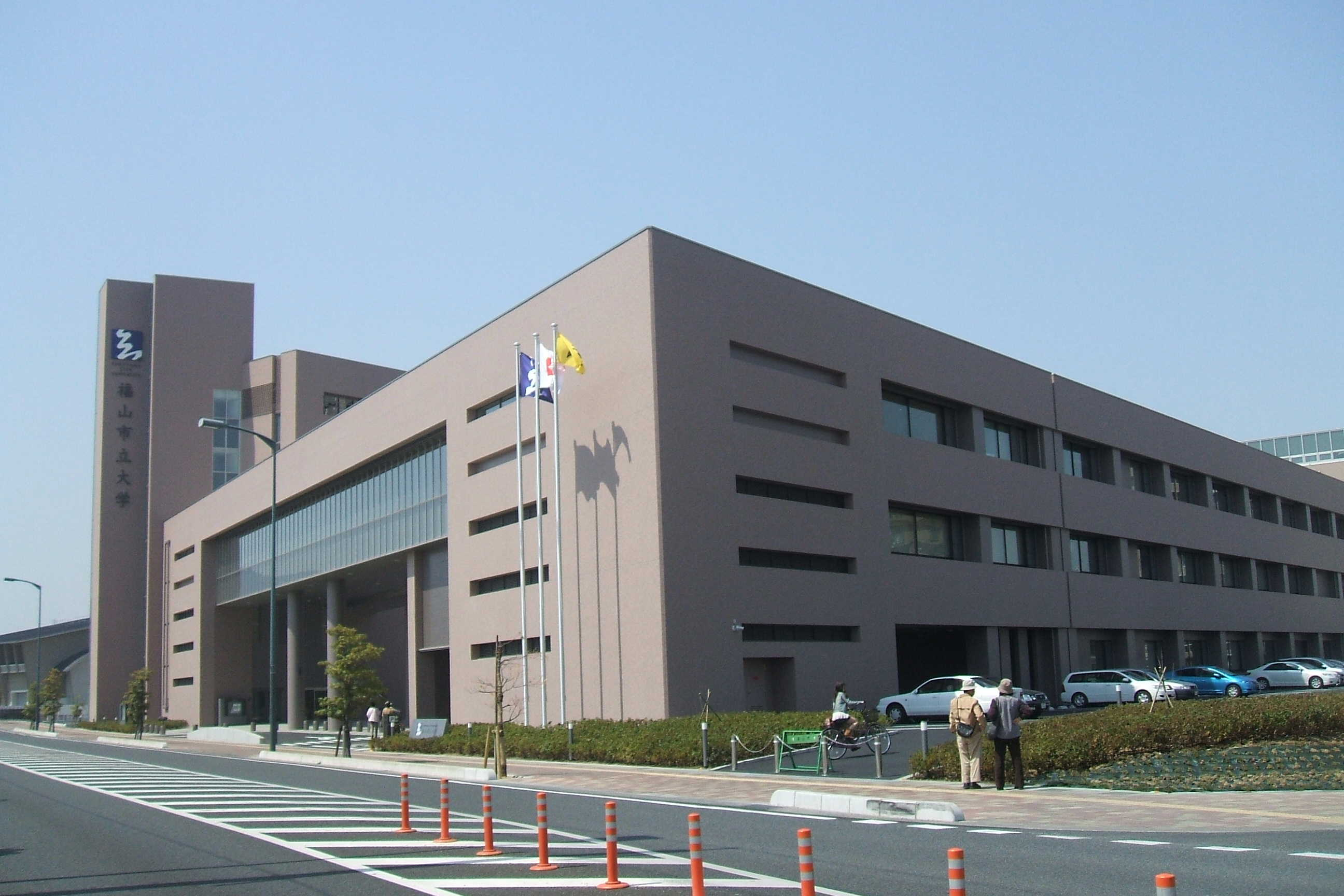
The main building of FCU

Fukuyama City University (福山市立大学, Fukuyama shiritsu daigaku) is a public co-educational university in Fukuyama, Hiroshima, Japan. In April 2011 it was established by reorganizing Fukuyama City Junior College for Women (founded in 1963).

The university is located in a new campus (Minatomachi Campus) next to Fukuyama Port. The older campus (Kitahonjo Campus of the women's junior college) is used as sports facilities, since the new campus lacks them.

== Organization ==
=== Undergraduate schools ===
- Faculty of Education
  - Department of Childhood Education
- Faculty of Urban Management
  - Department of Urban Management

=== Graduate schools ===
- Graduate School of Education
- Graduate School of Urban Management
