= 1963 in Japanese football =

1963 season

Japanese football in 1963

== Emperor's Cup ==
January 15, 1964

Waseda University	3–0	Hitachi
? (?) ? (?) ? (?)

Kobe Oji Stadium

== National team ==
=== Results ===
1963.08.08	Japan	4–3	Malaysia	Kuala Lumpur, Malaysia
	Sugiyama 21'; Yaegashi 30'; Watanabe 70'; T. Miyamoto 75'	JFA	? (?) ? (?) ? (?)

1963.08.10	Japan	4–1	Thailand	Kuala Lumpur, Malaysia
	T. Miyamoto 17'; Tsugitani 49', 63'; Watanabe 60'	JFA	? (?)

1963.08.12	Japan	5–1	South Vietnam	Kuala Lumpur, Malaysia
	Yaegashi 33', 36', 48'; Tsugitani 50'; Watanabe 58'	JFA	? (?)

1963.08.13	Japan	1–1	South Korea	Kuala Lumpur, Malaysia
	Tsugitani 65'	JFA	? (?)	Attendance: 15,000

1963.08.15	Japan	0–2	Chinese Taipei	Kuala Lumpur, Malaysia
		JFA	? (?) ? (?)	Attendance: 28,000

=== Players statistics ===
Player	-1962	08.08	08.10	08.12	08.13	08.15	1963	Total
Michihiro Ozawa	30(0)	O	O	O	O	O	5(0)	35(0)
Yasuo Takamori	28(0)	O	-	-	-	O	2(0)	30(0)
Mitsuo Kamata	26(2)	O	O	O	O	-	4(0)	30(2)
Shigeo Yaegashi	25(5)	O(1)	O	O(3)	O	O	5(4)	30(9)
Masakatsu Miyamoto	23(0)	-	O	O	O	O	4(0)	27(0)
Masashi Watanabe	20(6)	O(1)	O(1)	O(1)	O	O	5(3)	25(9)
Tsukasa Hosaka	13(0)	O	O	O	O	O	5(0)	18(0)
Teruki Miyamoto	12(4)	O(1)	O(1)	O	O	O	5(2)	17(6)
Ryuichi Sugiyama	9(0)	O(1)	O	O	O	O	5(1)	14(1)
Ryozo Suzuki	8(0)	O	O	O	O	O	5(0)	13(0)
Hiroshi Katayama	5(0)	O	O	O	O	O	5(0)	10(0)
Shozo Tsugitani	4(0)	O	O(2)	O(1)	O(1)	O	5(4)	9(4)
Aritatsu Ogi	0(0)	O	-	-	-	-	1(0)	1(0)

== Births ==
- 1 February: Yasuharu Kurata
- 15 November: Toru Sano
