= Fukuyama City Junior College for Women =

Public women's junior college in Fukuyama, Hiroshima, Japan

- 福山市立女子短期大学
- Type: public women's junior college
- Active: 1963–2010
- Location: Fukuyama, Hiroshima, Japan; 34°29′59.1″N 133°20′48.3″E

Fukuyama City Junior College for Women (福山市立女子短期大学, Fukuyama Shiritsu Joshi Tanki Daigaku) is a public women's junior college in Fukuyama, Hiroshima, Japan, established in 1963.

In August 2010 the college announced that it stopped admitting students in preparation for Fukuyama City University (established in April 2011).
