= Seppiko-Mineyama Prefectural Natural Park =

Japanese national park

Coordinates: 35°03′48″N 134°39′56″E

- 雪彦峰山県立自然公園
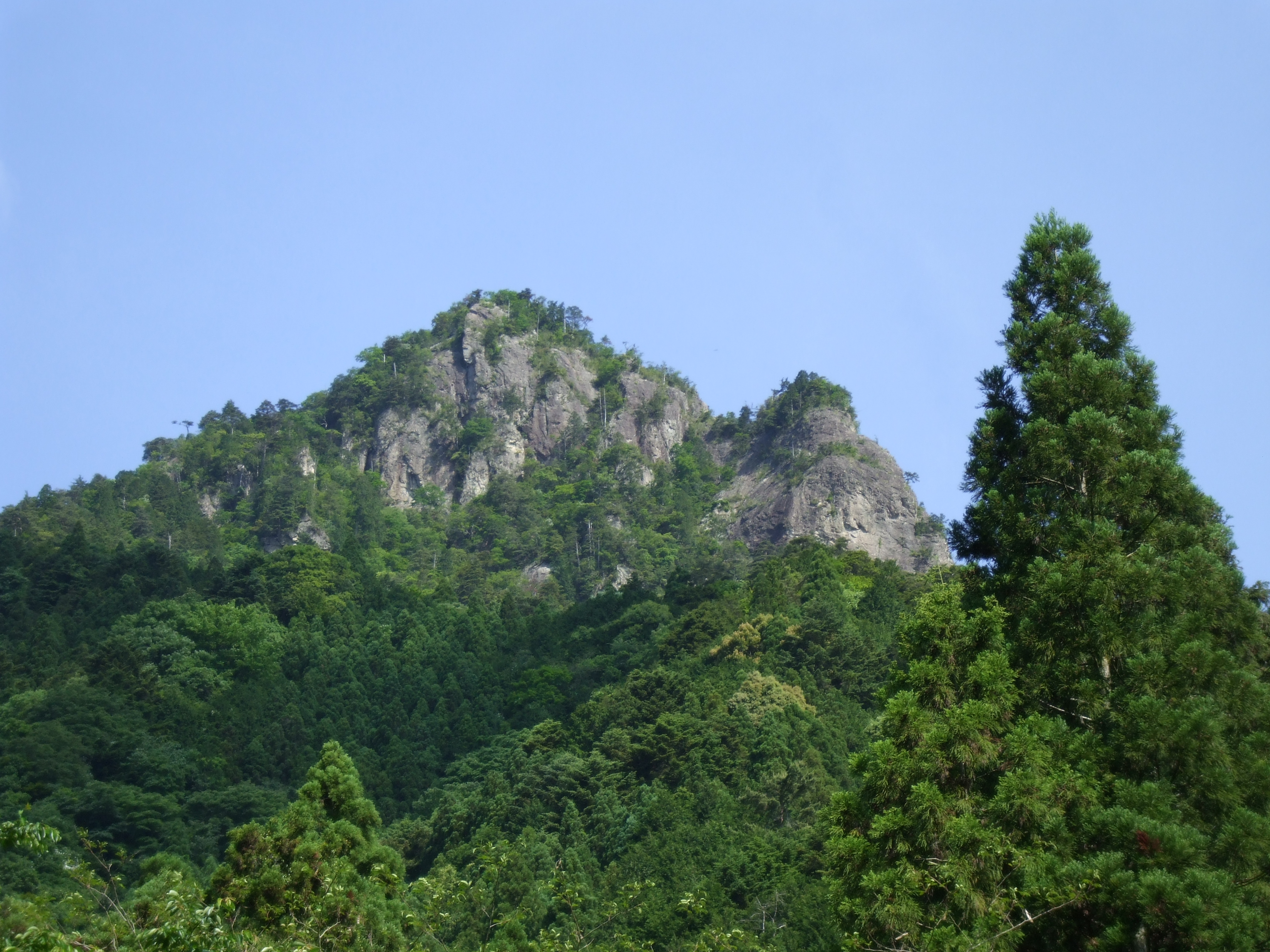
- Mount Seppiko
- Interactive map of Seppiko-Mineyama Prefectural Natural Park
- Location: Hyōgo Prefecture, Japan
- Area: 101.44 km^{2} (39.17 sq mi)
- Established: 21 May 1963

Seppiko-Mineyama Prefectural Natural Park (雪彦峰山県立自然公園, Seppiko-Mineyama kenritsu shizen kōen) is a Prefectural Natural Park in central Hyōgo Prefecture, Japan. Established in 1963, the park spans the municipalities of Asago, Himeji, Kamikawa, and Shisō.

== See also ==
- National Parks of Japan
