= Hakodate Otani College =

College in Hokkaido, Japan

Coordinates: 41°48′5.6″N 140°45′46.5″E

Hakodate Otani College (函館大谷短期大学, Hakodate ōtani tanki daigaku)

Hakodate Otani Gakuen

is a private junior college in Hakodate, Hokkaido, Japan, established in 1963.
