= Tsurumi rail accident =

1963 train accident in Japan

Coordinates: 35°29′33.1″N 139°39′46.6″E

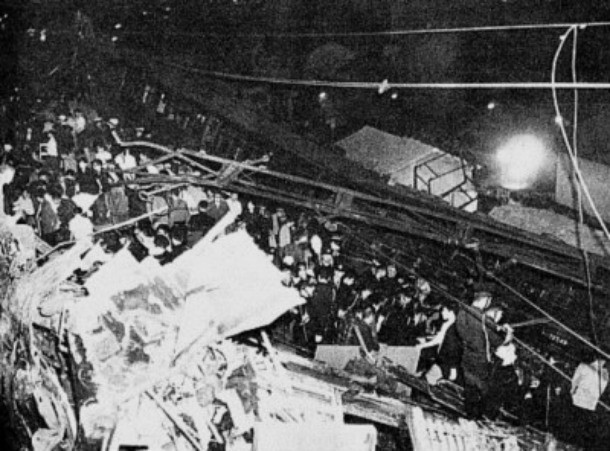

Details
- Date: November 9, 1963; 62 years ago
- Location: Yokohama
- Country: Japan
- Line: Tōkaidō Main Line
- Operator: Japanese National Railways
- Incident type: Derailment and collision
- Cause: Track problems

Statistics
- Trains: 3
- Deaths: 162
- Injured: 120

The Tsurumi rail accident (鶴見事故, Tsurumi jiko; or "Tsurumi accident") occurred on November 9, 1963, between Tsurumi and Shin-Koyasu stations on the Tōkaidō Main Line in Yokohama, Japan, about 30 kilometres (20 mi) south of Tokyo, when two passenger trains collided with a derailed freight train, killing 162 people.

== Accident ==
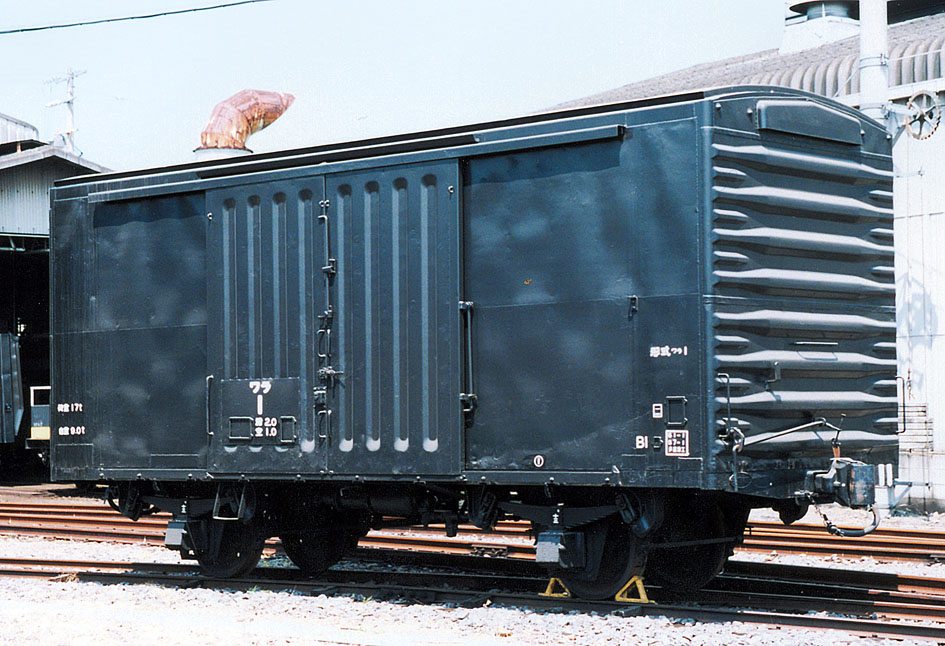
WaRa 1 freight car (date unknown). A freight car like this one was involved in the Tsurumi rail accident.

The 43rd wagon (type WaRa 1) of a long freight train hauled by a JNR Class EF15 electric locomotive on the down freight line derailed and the two following wagons overturned, blocking the adjacent up passenger line. Within seconds, a 12-carriage electric multiple unit (EMU) train traveling to Tokyo collided with the freight wagons and the front three carriages (KuHa 76039, MoHa 70079 and KuMoHa 50006 respectively) derailed, falling into the side of the fourth and fifth carriages of another 12-carriage train to Kurihama passing on the down passenger line. The multiple collision left 161 dead and 120 injured.

== Investigation ==
The initial JNR investigation found that the speed of the freight train (60 km/h) was not excessive, nor were any problems found with the line or rolling stock. For five years from 1967 until 1972, the RTRI carried out tests on a test track located at Karikachi Pass in Hokkaido on an abandoned alternative route of the Nemuro Main Line (Shintoku - Niinai) using the same rails and rolling stock and found that the combination of wheelset design, rail cross section and wear, and track geometry all had a role in the derailment. As a result of the investigation, the old method of static track inspection was replaced with new track inspection cars employing dynamic inspection methods and data collection.

== Similar accidents ==
- Beresfield train collision
- Clapham Junction rail crash
- Southall rail crash

== See also ==
- Lists of rail accidents
