= Niigata Women's College =

Coordinates: 37°55′25.1″N 139°7′37.6″E

Niigata Women's College (県立新潟女子短期大学, Kenritsu niigata joshi tanki daigaku) was a prefectural junior college in Niigata, Niigata, Japan, established in 1963. The school was closed on March 31, 2012, and the school buildings were succeeded by the University of Niigata Prefecture (established in April 2009).

== History ==
The college was founded in April 1963 with one department: the Department of Domestic Science. In 1966 two departments were added: the Departments of English and Early Childhood Education. In 1993 the Department of International Studies was added, and the former Department of Domestic Science was renamed Department of Human Life and Environmental Science.

== Organization ==
Associate degree courses (2-year)

- Department of Human Life and Environmental Science
  - Courses: Human Environmental Science, Food & Nutrition, and Social Welfare
- Department of Early Childhood Education
- Department of English
- Department of International Studies
  - Courses: Russian, Chinese, and Korean

Advanced courses (2-year; accredited by the NIAD-UE)

- Advanced Course of Food and Nutrition Science
