= Nikkan Sports =

Japanese sports newspaper

- Front page of Nikkan Sports on November 10, 2026
- Type: Daily newspaper
- Format: Print, online
- Owner: The Asahi Shimbun Company
- Publisher: Nikkan Sports Newspaper Research Office
- Founded: 1946
- Language: Japanese
- Website: www.nikkansports.com

Nikkan Sports (Japanese: 日刊スポーツ, Hepburn: Nikkan Supōtsu; lit. 'The Daily Sports') is a Japanese daily sports newspaper. Founded in 1946, it was Japan's first sports newspaper. It is published by Nikkan Sports Holdings, a subsidiary of The Asahi Shimbun Company. It is the largest sports newspaper in Japan with a circulation of 1,660,000 by 2026.

Alongside its sports coverage, it also features celebrity and political news.

== Overview ==
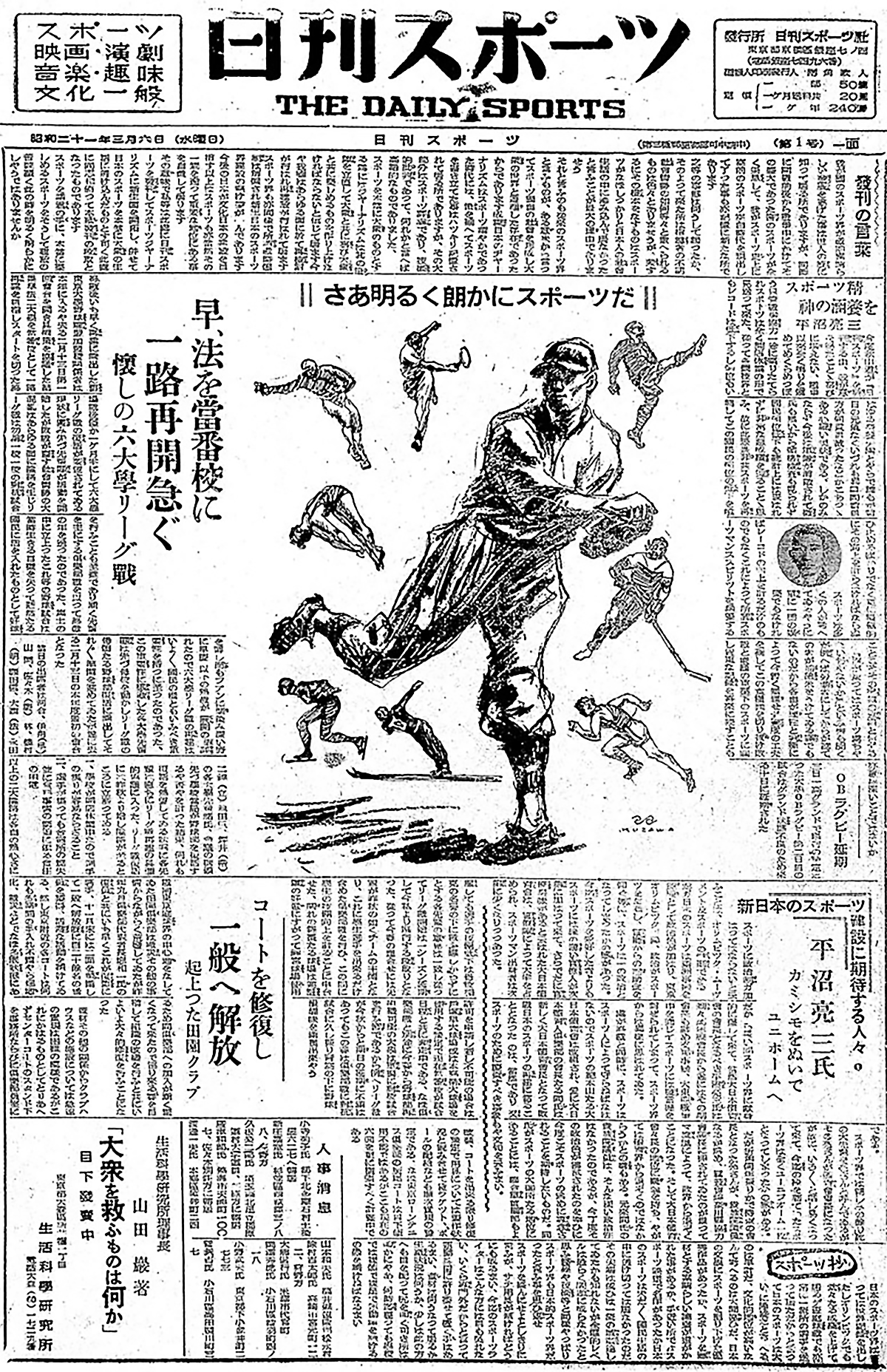
Nikkan Sports first issue, March 6, 1946

Nikkan Sports was founded on March 6, 1946. It is the first sports newspaper in Japan. In June 1957, the Osaka-based publication All Sports (オールスポーツ) was renamed Nikkan Sports, and its publisher, All Sports Inc., was renamed Osaka Nikkan Sports Shimbun Inc. Later, Hokkaido Nikkan Sports was launched in May 1962. They also launched the Seibu Nikkan Sports Shimbun in April 1977, and Nagoya Nikkan Sports in June 1995. In June 1986, printing operations also began in London. It launched its website on January 8, 1997. On August 30, 2010, the newspaper falsely reported that an agreement had been reached to appoint José Pekerman as the next manager of the Japanese national football team but it was later revealed that the person who actually took up the position that day was Alberto Zaccheroni. It becomes a holding company in April 2025.

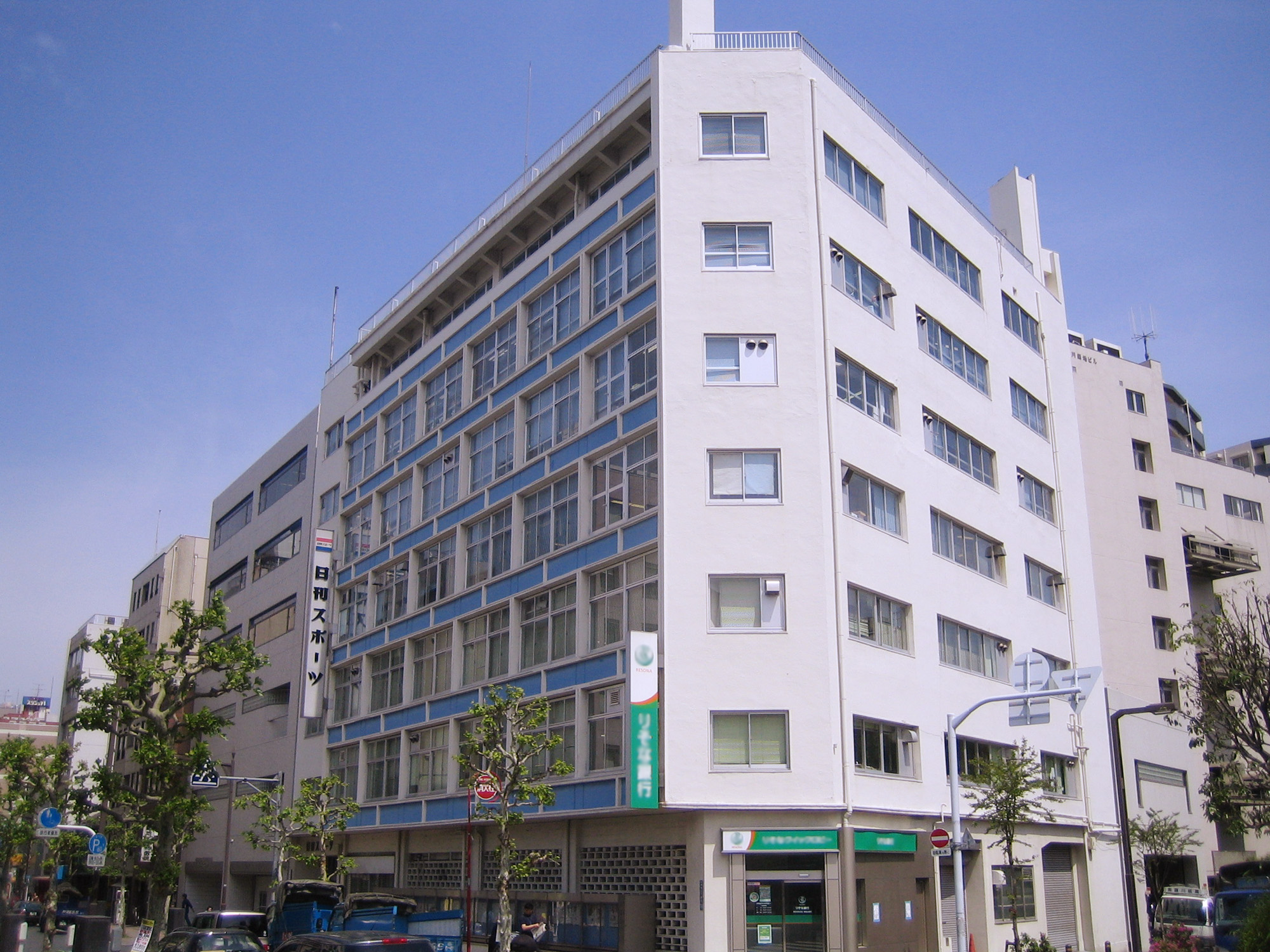
Nikkan Sports headquarters in Tokyo

The Nikkan Sports Holdings is owned and in a capital alliance with The Asahi Shimbun Company, the publisher of The Asahi Shimbun. It is the largest sports newspaper in Japan by circulation, with an estimated 1.66 million copies in circulation by 2026. Alongside its sports coverage, it also features an "infotainment" on celebrity news, which was described as a "more populist approach to reporting". It also features political news under its "society" (社会, shakai) page. The newspaper coverage was described to have "relatively conservative stance on issues such as nationalism and gender representation", particularly on its coverage of the 2012 Summer Olympics was described as being "coloured by nationalism and gender stereotypes."

== See also ==
- Nikkan Sports Film Award
- Nikkan Sports Drama Grand Prix
