= Utsubo Football Stadium =

Football stadium in Osaka, Japan

- 靭サッカー場
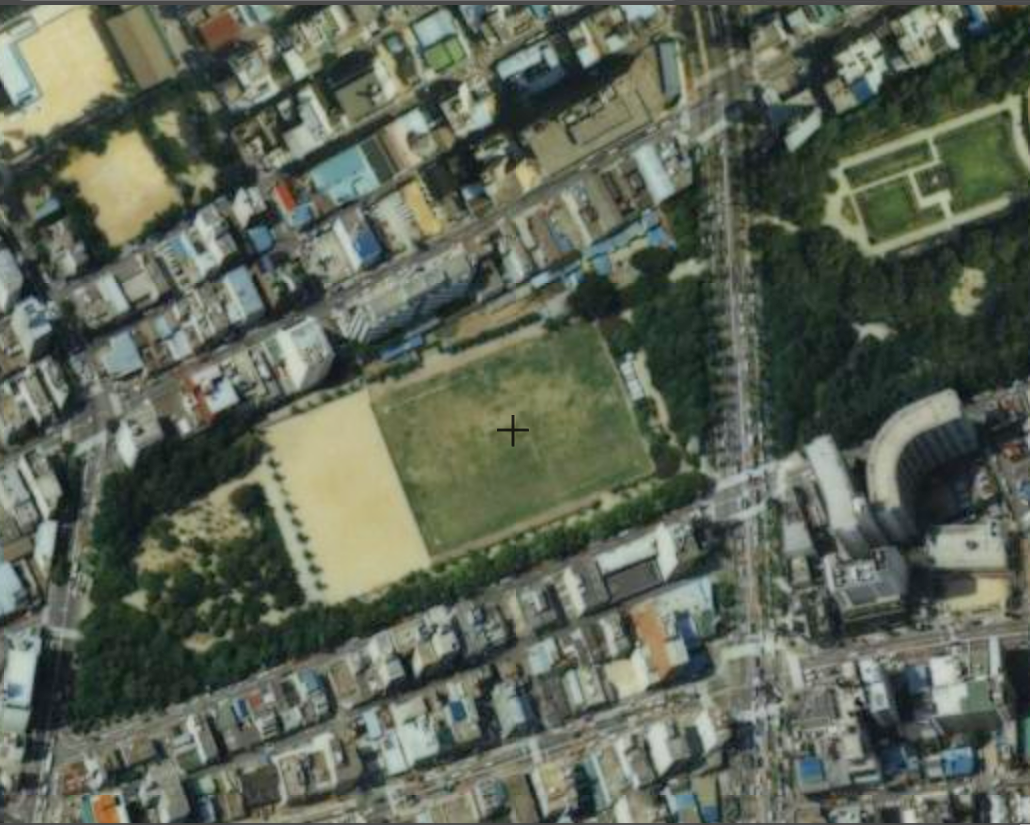
- Interactive map of Utsubo Football Stadium
- Location: Osaka, Osaka, Japan
- Owner: Osaka City

Construction
- Opened: 1955
- Closed: 1996

Utsubo Football Stadium (靭サッカー場) was a football stadium in Osaka, Osaka, Japan. It hosted the 1960 Emperor's Cup and final game between Furukawa Electric and Keio BRB on May 6, 1960.
