= 1960 Emperor's Cup final =

1960 Emperor's Cup Final
Furukawa Electric	Keio BRB
4	0
- Date: May 6, 1960
- Venue: Utsubo Football Stadium, Osaka

1960 Emperor's Cup Final was the 40th final of the Emperor's Cup competition. The final was played at Utsubo Football Stadium in Osaka on May 6, 1960. Furukawa Electric won the championship.

== Overview ==
Furukawa Electric won their 1st title, by defeating Keio BRB 4–0.

== Match details ==
May 6, 1960

Furukawa Electric	4–0	Keio BRB
? (?) ? (?) ? (?) ? (?)

Utsubo Football Stadium

== See also ==
- 1960 Emperor's Cup
