= List of Emperor's Cup finals =

List of annual association football matches

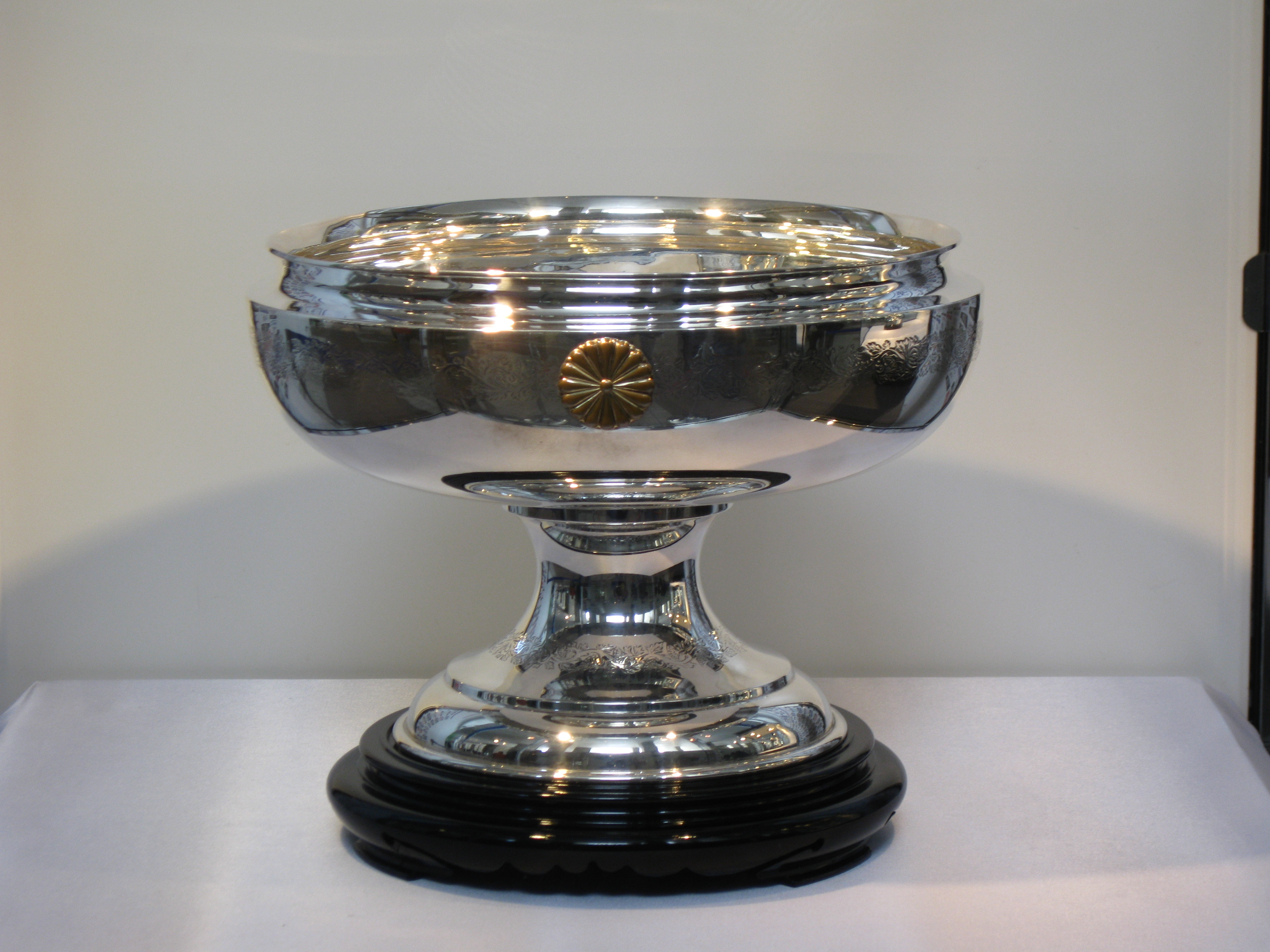
- The Emperor's Cup award stand
- Founded: 1921; 105 years ago
- Region: Japan
- Current champions: Machida Zelvia (1st title)
- Most championships: Keio BRB (9 titles)
- 2026 Emperor's Cup final

The Emperor's Cup JFA All-Japan Football Championship Tournament, (Note: The logo used in Japan is labeled 「天皇杯 JFA CHAMPIONSHIP」or「天皇杯」.) commonly known as the Emperor's Cup (Note: Tennōhai, Sakkā Tennōhai (天皇杯, サッカー天皇杯)) is the Japanese national association football cup. The competition is open to all J1 and J2 League clubs as well as 47 amateur teams, each representing their own prefecture, plus one invitee.

The tournament was first held in 1921, the same year the Greater Japan Football Association (大日本蹴球協会, Dai-Nippon Shūkyū Kyōkai) was founded. Since then, 96 single-match finals have taken place. In the beginning, the competition was popular among universities throughout Japan. The 1926 edition was abandoned due to the death of Emperor Taishō. The 1934 cup was not held owing to the Far Eastern Championship Games. World War II caused two interruptions: the first in 1941–1945 amid the conflict itself and the second in 1947–1948, when Japan was occupied by the United States. The Emperor's Cup was broadened to all Japanese sides in 1972, including those playing in the Japan Soccer League, following calls to emulate the English FA Cup.

During Japan's colonial era, from 1895 to 1945, the competition was open also to clubs from colonies such as Korea and Taiwan. In 1935, Seoul-based club Kyungsung was the sole club outside the Japanese islands to win the trophy, having defeated Tokyo Bunri University 6–1. In 1931 and in 1936 respectively, modern-day Taiwanese Kobun Junior High School and Korean Bosung College were the runners-up of the tournament.

Fifteen finals have ended in a draw after 90 minutes, twelve were decided in extra-time and on five occasions by penalty shoot-out. In 1964, Yawata Steel and Furukawa Electric shared the trophy after the score was 0–0 after extra-time. Yamaha Motor Company won the title after defeating Fujita Industries in the replay 1–0 in 1982; the previous match had been drawn 0–0. Since 1968, the final has generally taken place on 1 January the following year. For instance, the 2026 final will be played on 1 January 2027.

Keio University have been crowned champions nine times. Sanfrecce Hiroshima have a record twelve final losses. After Japanese football was professionalized in 1992, Kashima Antlers have held the title five times.

== List of Emperor's Cup finals ==
Key to list of winners
†	Match went to extra time
*	Match decided via penalty shoot-out
§	Match decided via replay
&	Title shared after a draw
‡	Winning team won the Double (League title and Emperor's Cup)
#	Team from outside the top tier of the Japanese football league system (after 1965)

- The "Season" column refers to the season the competition was held, and wikilinks to the article about that season.
- The wikilinks in the "Score" column point to the article about that season's final game. All teams are Japanese, except where marked (Taiwan) (Taiwanese) or (South Korea) (Korean).

Emperor's Cup finals
Season	Winners	Score	Runners-up	Venue	Attendance
1921	Tokyo Shukyu-dan	1–0	Mikage Shukyu-dan (Kobe)	Hibiya Park, Tokyo	—N/a
1922	Nagoya Shukyu-dan	1–0	Hiroshima Koto-shihan	Toshima-shihan Ground, Tokyo	—N/a
1923	Astra Club (Tokyo)	2–1	Nagoya Shukyu-dan	Tokyo Koto-shihan Ground, Tokyo	—N/a
1924	Rijo Shukyu Football Club (Hiroshima)	1–0	All Mikage Shihan Club (Kobe)	Meiji Jingu Stadium, Tokyo	—N/a
1925	Rijo Shukyu Football Club (Hiroshima)	3–0	Imperial University of Tokyo	Meiji Jingu Stadium, Tokyo	—N/a
1926	Cancelled due to the death of Emperor Taishō				
1927	Kobe-Ichi Junior High School Club	2–0	Rijo Shukyu Football Club (Hiroshima)	Meiji Jingu Stadium, Tokyo	—N/a
1928	Waseda University WMW	6–1	Imperial University of Kyoto	Meiji Jingu Stadium, Tokyo	—N/a
1929	Kwangaku Club	3–0	Hosei University	Meiji Jingu Stadium, Tokyo	—N/a
1930	Kwangaku Club	3–0	Keio BRB	Koshien-minami Ground, Nishinomiya	—N/a
1931	Imperial Univ. of Tokyo LB	3–0	(Taiwan) Kobun Junior High School	Meiji Jingu Stadium, Tokyo	—N/a
1932	Keio Club	5–1	Yoshino Club (Nagoya)	Koshien-minami Ground, Nishinomiya	—N/a
1933	Tokyo Old Boys Club	4–1	Sendai Soccer Club	Meiji Jingu Stadium, Tokyo	—N/a
1934	Not held due to the 1934 Far Eastern Championship Games				
1935	(South Korea) Kyungsung FC	6–1	Tokyo Bunri University	Meiji Jingu Stadium, Tokyo	—N/a
1936	Keio BRB	3–2	(South Korea) Bosung College	Army Toyama Ground, Tokyo	—N/a
1937	Keio University	3–0	Kobe University of Commerce	Meiji Jingu Stadium, Tokyo	—N/a
1938	Waseda University	4–1	Keio University	Meiji Jingu Stadium, Tokyo	—N/a
1939	Keio BRB	3–2	Waseda University	Meiji Jingu Stadium, Tokyo	—N/a
1940	Keio BRB	1–0	Waseda University WMW	Meiji Jingu Stadium, Tokyo	—N/a
1941–1945	Suspended during World War II				
1946	University of Tokyo LB	3–2	Kobe University of Economics	Tokyo Imperial Univ. Gotenshita Stadium, Tokyo	—N/a
1947–1948	Cancelled due to post-World War II unrest				
1949	University of Tokyo LB	3–2	Kandai Club	Waseda Univ. Higashifushimi Ground, Nishitokyo	—N/a
1950	All Kwangaku	6–1	Keio University	Kariya City Stadium, Kariya	—N/a
1951	Keio BRB	3–2	Osaka Club	Miyagino Soccer Stadium, Sendai	—N/a
1952	All Keio	6–2	Osaka Club	Fujieda Higashi High School, Fujieda	—N/a
1953	All Kwangaku	5–4^{†}	Osaka Club	Nishikyogoku Stadium, Kyoto	—N/a
1954	Keio BRB	5–3	Toyo Industries	Yamanashi Prefectural Stadium, Kofu	—N/a
1955	All Kwangaku	4–2	Chuo University Club	Nishinomiya Stadium, Nishinomiya	—N/a
1956	Keio BRB	4–2	Yawata Steel	Omiya Athletic Stadium, Omiya	—N/a
1957	Chuo University Club	1–0	Toyo Industries	Kokutaiji High School, Hiroshima	—N/a
1958	Kwangaku Club	1–0	Yawata Steel	Fujieda Higashi High School, Fujieda	—N/a
1959	Kwangaku Club	1–0	Chuo University	koishikawa Football Stadium, Tokyo	—N/a
1960	Furukawa Electric	4–0	Keio BRB	Osaka Utsubo Soccer Stadium, Osaka	—N/a
1961	Furukawa Electric	3–2	Chuo University	Fujieda Higashi High School, Fujieda	—N/a
1962	Chuo University	2–1	Furukawa Electric	Kyoto Nishikyogoku Stadium, Kyoto	—N/a
1963	Waseda University	2–1	Hitachi	Kobe Oji Stadium, Kobe	—N/a
1964	Yawata Steel; Furukawa Electric	0–0^{&} (Note: Match ended 0–0 after extra time; title shared.)	None (title shared)	Kobe Oji Stadium, Kobe	—N/a
1965	Toyo Industries ‡	3–2	Yawata Steel	Tokyo Komazawa Stadium, Tokyo	—N/a
1966	Waseda University #	3–2^{†}	Toyo Industries	Tokyo Komazawa Stadium, Tokyo	—N/a
1967	Toyo Industries ‡	1–0	Mitsubishi Heavy Industries	Tokyo National Stadium, Tokyo	—N/a
1968	Yanmar Diesel	1–0	Mitsubishi Heavy Industries	Tokyo National Stadium, Tokyo	—N/a
1969	Toyo Industries	4–1	Rikkyo University #	Tokyo National Stadium, Tokyo	—N/a
1970	Yanmar Diesel	2–1^{†}	Toyo Industries	Tokyo National Stadium, Tokyo	—N/a
1971	Mitsubishi Heavy Industries	3–1	Yanmar Diesel	Tokyo National Stadium, Tokyo	—N/a
1972	Hitachi ‡	2–1	Yanmar Diesel	Tokyo National Stadium, Tokyo	—N/a
1973	Mitsubishi Heavy Industries ‡	2–1	Hitachi	Tokyo National Stadium, Tokyo	—N/a
1974	Yanmar Diesel ‡	2–1	Eidai Industries	Tokyo National Stadium, Tokyo	—N/a
1975	Hitachi	2–0	Fujita Industries	Tokyo National Stadium, Tokyo	—N/a
1976	Furukawa Electric ‡	4–1	Yanmar Diesel	Tokyo National Stadium, Tokyo	—N/a
1977	Fujita Industries ‡	4–1	Yanmar Diesel	Tokyo National Stadium, Tokyo	—N/a
1978	Mitsubishi Heavy Industries ‡	1–0	Toyo Industries	Tokyo National Stadium, Tokyo	—N/a
1979	Fujita Industries ‡	2–1	Mitsubishi Heavy Industries	Tokyo National Stadium, Tokyo	—N/a
1980	Mitsubishi Heavy Industries	1–0	Tanabe Pharmaceutical #	Tokyo National Stadium, Tokyo	—N/a
1981	Nippon Kokan #	2–0	Yomiuri FC	Tokyo National Stadium, Tokyo	—N/a
1982	Yamaha Motor Company #	0–0	Fujita Industries	Tokyo National Stadium, Tokyo	—N/a
1982	Yamaha Motor Company #	1–0 §	Fujita Industries	Tokyo National Stadium, Tokyo	—N/a
1983	Nissan Motor Company	2–0	Yanmar Diesel	Tokyo National Stadium, Tokyo	—N/a
1984	Yomiuri FC ‡	2–0	Furukawa Electric	Tokyo National Stadium, Tokyo	—N/a
1985	Nissan Motor Company	2–0	Fujita Industries	Tokyo National Stadium, Tokyo	—N/a
1986	Yomiuri FC ‡	2–1	Nippon Kokan	Tokyo National Stadium, Tokyo	—N/a
1987	Yomiuri FC	2–0	Mazda Soccer Club	Tokyo National Stadium, Tokyo	—N/a
1988	Nissan Motor Company ‡	3–2^{†}	Fujita Industries	Tokyo National Stadium, Tokyo	—N/a
1989	Nissan Motor Company ‡	3–2	Yamaha Motor Company	Tokyo National Stadium, Tokyo	—N/a
1990	Matsushita Electric Industrial	0–0* (Note: Score was 0–0 after 90 minutes and extra time. Matsushita Electric Industrial won the penalty shoot-out 4–3.)	Nissan Motor Company	Tokyo National Stadium, Tokyo	—N/a
1991	Nissan Motor Company	4–2^{†}	Yomiuri FC	Tokyo National Stadium, Tokyo	—N/a
1992	Yokohama Marinos	2–1^{†}	Verdy Kawasaki	Tokyo National Stadium, Tokyo	—N/a
1993	Yokohama Flügels	6–2^{†}	Kashima Antlers	Tokyo National Stadium, Tokyo	—N/a
1994	Bellmare Hiratsuka	2–0	Cerezo Osaka #	Tokyo National Stadium, Tokyo	—N/a
1995	Nagoya Grampus Eight	3–0	Sanfrecce Hiroshima	Tokyo National Stadium, Tokyo	—N/a
1996	Verdy Kawasaki	3–0	Sanfrecce Hiroshima	Tokyo National Stadium, Tokyo	—N/a
1997	Kashima Antlers	3–0	Yokohama Flügels	Tokyo National Stadium, Tokyo	—N/a
1998	Yokohama Flügels	2–1	Shimizu S-Pulse	Tokyo National Stadium, Tokyo	—N/a
1999	Nagoya Grampus Eight	2–0	Sanfrecce Hiroshima	Tokyo National Stadium, Tokyo	—N/a
2000	Kashima Antlers ‡	3–2^{†}	Shimizu S-Pulse	Tokyo National Stadium, Tokyo	—N/a
2001	Shimizu S-Pulse	3–2	Cerezo Osaka	Tokyo National Stadium, Tokyo	—N/a
2002	Kyoto Purple Sanga	2–1	Kashima Antlers	Tokyo National Stadium, Tokyo	—N/a
2003	Júbilo Iwata	1–0	Cerezo Osaka	Tokyo National Stadium, Tokyo	—N/a
2004	Tokyo Verdy 1969	2–1	Júbilo Iwata	Tokyo National Stadium, Tokyo	—N/a
2005	Urawa Red Diamonds	2–1	Shimizu S-Pulse	Tokyo National Stadium, Tokyo	51,000
2006	Urawa Red Diamonds ‡	1–0	Gamba Osaka	Tokyo National Stadium, Tokyo	48,880
2007	Kashima Antlers ‡	2–0	Sanfrecce Hiroshima	Tokyo National Stadium, Tokyo	46,361
2008	Gamba Osaka	1–0^{†}	Kashiwa Reysol	Tokyo National Stadium, Tokyo	32,582
2009	Gamba Osaka	4–1	Nagoya Grampus	Tokyo National Stadium, Tokyo	42,140
2010	Kashima Antlers	2–1	Shimizu S-Pulse	Tokyo National Stadium, Tokyo	41,348
2011	FC Tokyo #	4–2	Kyoto Sanga #	Tokyo National Stadium, Tokyo	41,174
2012	Kashiwa Reysol	1–0	Gamba Osaka	Tokyo National Stadium, Tokyo	46,480
2013	Yokohama F. Marinos	2–0	Sanfrecce Hiroshima	Tokyo National Stadium, Tokyo	46,782
2014	Gamba Osaka ‡	3–1	Montedio Yamagata #	International Stadium Yokohama, Yokohama	42,012
2015	Gamba Osaka	2–1	Urawa Red Diamonds	Ajinomoto Stadium, Chofu	43,809
2016	Kashima Antlers ‡	2–1^{†}	Kawasaki Frontale	Suita City Football Stadium, Suita	34,161
2017	Cerezo Osaka	2–1^{†}	Yokohama F. Marinos	Saitama Stadium 2002, Saitama	42,029
2018	Urawa Red Diamonds	1–0	Vegalta Sendai	Saitama Stadium 2002, Saitama	50,978
2019	Vissel Kobe	2–0	Kashima Antlers	Japan National Stadium, Tokyo	57,597
2020	Kawasaki Frontale ‡	1–0	Gamba Osaka	Japan National Stadium, Tokyo	13,318
2021	Urawa Red Diamonds	2–1	Oita Trinita	Japan National Stadium, Tokyo	57,785
2022	Ventforet Kofu #	1–1* (Note: Score was 1–1 after 90 minutes and extra time. Ventforet Kofu won the penalty shoot-out 5–4.)	Sanfrecce Hiroshima	Nissan Stadium, Yokohama	37,998
2023	Kawasaki Frontale	0–0* (Note: Score was 0–0 after 90 minutes and extra time. Kawasaki Frontale won the penalty shoot-out 8–7.)	Kashiwa Reysol	Japan National Stadium, Tokyo	62,837
2024	Vissel Kobe ‡	1–0	Gamba Osaka	Japan National Stadium, Tokyo	56,824
2025	Machida Zelvia ‡	3–1	Vissel Kobe	Japan National Stadium, Tokyo	31,414

== Performances ==
=== All-time ===
Club	Winners	Runners-up	Winning years	Runners-up years
Keio BRB	9	2	1932, 1936, 1937, 1939, 1940, 1951, 1952, 1954, 1956	1930, 1960
Urawa Red Diamonds	8	4	1971, 1973, 1978, 1980, 2005, 2006, 2018, 2021	1967, 1968, 1979, 2015
Yokohama F. Marinos	7	2	1983, 1985, 1988, 1989, 1991, 1992, 2013	1990, 2017
Kwansei Gakuin University	7	0	1929, 1930, 1950, 1953, 1955, 1958, 1959	
Gamba Osaka	5	4	1990, 2008, 2009, 2014, 2015	2006, 2012, 2020, 2024
Tokyo Verdy	5	3	1984, 1986, 1987, 1996, 2004	1981, 1991, 1992
Kashima Antlers	5	3	1997, 2000, 2007, 2010, 2016	1993, 2002, 2019
Cerezo Osaka	4	8	1968, 1970, 1974, 2017	1971, 1972, 1976, 1977, 1983, 1994, 2001, 2003
JEF United Chiba	4	2	1960, 1961, 1964, 1976	1962, 1984
Sanfrecce Hiroshima	3	12	1965, 1967, 1969	1954, 1957, 1966, 1970, 1978, 1987, 1995, 1996, 1999, 2007, 2013, 2022
Kashiwa Reysol	3	4	1972, 1975, 2012	1963, 1973, 2008, 2023
Shonan Bellmare	3	4	1977, 1979, 1994	1975, 1982, 1985, 1988
Imperial Univ. of Tokyo LB	3	1	1931, 1946, 1949	1925
Waseda University	3	1	1938, 1963, 1966	1939
Júbilo Iwata	2	2	1982, 2003	1989, 2004
Rijo Shukyu Football Club (Hiroshima)	2	1	1924, 1925	1927
Yokohama Flügels	2	1	1993, 1998	1997
Nagoya Grampus	2	1	1995, 1999	2009
Kawasaki Frontale	2	1	2020, 2023	2016
Vissel Kobe	2	1	2019, 2024	2025
Shimizu S-Pulse	1	4	2001	1998, 2000, 2005, 2010
Yawata Steel	1	3	1964	1956, 1958, 1965
Keio University (Enrolled students)	1	2	1937	1938, 1950
Chuo University	1	2	1962	1959, 1961
Waseda University WMW	1	1	1928	1940
Chuo University Club	1	1	1957	1955
Nagoya Shukyu-dan	1	1	1922	1923
Nippon Kokan	1	1	1981	1986
Kyoto Sanga	1	1	2002	2011
Tokyo Shukyu-dan	1	0	1921	
Astra Club (Tokyo)	1	0	1923	
Kobe-Ichi Junior High School Club	1	0	1927	
Tokyo Old Boys Club	1	0	1933	
(South Korea) Kyungsung FC	1	0	1935	
FC Tokyo	1	0	2011	
Ventforet Kofu	1	0	2022	
Machida Zelvia	1	0	2025	
Osaka Club	0	3		1951, 1952, 1953
Kobe University of Commerce	0	2		1937, 1946
Mikage Shukyu-dan (Kobe)	0	1		1921
Hiroshima Koto-shihan	0	1		1922
All Mikage Shihan Club (Kobe)	0	1		1924
Imperial University of Kyoto	0	1		1928
Hosei University	0	1		1929
(Taiwan) Kobun Junior High School	0	1		1931
Yoshino Club (Nagoya)	0	1		1932
Sendai Soccer Club	0	1		1933
Tokyo Bunri University	0	1		1935
(South Korea) Bosung College	0	1		1936
Kandai Club	0	1		1949
Rikkyo University	0	1		1969
Eidai Industries	0	1		1974
Tanabe Pharmaceutical	0	1		1980
Montedio Yamagata	0	1		2014
Vegalta Sendai	0	1		2018
Oita Trinita	0	1		2021

=== J.League era (1992–present) ===
Club	Winners	Runners-up	Winning seasons	Runners-up seasons
Kashima Antlers	5	3	1997, 2000, 2007, 2010, 2016	1993, 2002, 2019
Gamba Osaka	4	4	2008, 2009, 2014, 2015	2006, 2012, 2020, 2024
Urawa Red Diamonds	4	1	2005, 2006, 2018, 2021	2015
Yokohama F. Marinos	2	1	1992, 2013	2017
Yokohama Flügels	2	1	1993, 1998	1997
Nagoya Grampus	2	1	1995, 1999	2009
Tokyo Verdy	2	1	1996, 2004	1992
Kawasaki Frontale	2	1	2020, 2023	2016
Vissel Kobe	2	1	2019, 2024	2025
Shimizu S-Pulse	1	4	2001	1998, 2000, 2005, 2010
Cerezo Osaka	1	3	2017	1994, 2001, 2003
Kashiwa Reysol	1	2	2012	2008, 2023
Kyoto Sanga	1	1	2002	2011
Júbilo Iwata	1	1	2003	2004
Shonan Bellmare	1	0	1994	
FC Tokyo	1	0	2011	
Ventforet Kofu	1	0	2022	
Machida Zelvia	1	0	2025	
Sanfrecce Hiroshima	0	6		1995, 1996, 1999, 2007, 2013, 2022
Montedio Yamagata	0	1		2014
Vegalta Sendai	0	1		2018
Oita Trinita	0	1		2021

== See also ==
- Football in Japan

== Bibliography ==
- Suzuki, Takeshi, ed. (1987). 天皇杯六十五年史 全日本サッカー選手権全記録 [65-Year History of the Emperor's Cup: Complete Record of the All Japan Football Championship] (in Japanese). Japan Football Association. ASIN B00949QM64.
