= 1930 in Japanese football =

1930 season

Japanese football in 1930.

== Emperor's Cup ==
February 11, 1930

Kwangaku Club	3–0	Keio BRB
? ?' ? ?' ? ?'

Koshien South Ground

== National team ==
=== Results ===
1930.05.25	Japan	7–2	Philippines	Tokyo, Japan
	Wakabayashi 10', 12', 22', 51'; 16' (o.g.); Teshima 32'; Ichihashi 86'	JFA	? ?' ? ?'	Stadium: Meiji Jingu Gaien Stadium

1930.05.29	Japan	3–3	Republic of China	Tokyo, Japan
	Teshima 23'; Takayama 57'; Shinojima 73'	JFA	? ?' ? ?' ? ?'	Stadium: Meiji Jingu Gaien Stadium

=== Players statistics ===
Player	-1929	05.25	05.29	1930	Total
Shigemaru Takenokoshi	3(1)	O	O	2(0)	5(1)
Nagayasu Honda	2(0)	O	O	2(0)	4(0)
Yasuo Haruyama	2(0)	O	O	2(0)	4(0)
Takeo Wakabayashi	0(0)	O(4)	O	2(4)	2(4)
Shiro Teshima	0(0)	O(1)	O(1)	2(2)	2(2)
Tokizo Ichihashi	0(0)	O(1)	O	2(1)	2(1)
Hideo Shinojima	0(0)	O	O(1)	2(1)	2(1)
Tadao Takayama	0(0)	O	O(1)	2(1)	2(1)
Saizo Saito	0(0)	O	O	2(0)	2(0)
Teizo Takeuchi	0(0)	O	O	2(0)	2(0)
Yukio Goto	0(0)	O	O	2(0)	2(0)
Masao Nozawa	0(0)	O	O	2(0)	2(0)
Tameo Ide	0(0)	O	-	1(0)	1(0)

== Births ==
- April 2 - Yoshinori Shigematsu
- July 7 - Tadao Kobayashi
- September 5 - Ken Naganuma
