= 1940 in Japanese football =

1940 season

Japanese football in 1940.

== Emperor's Cup ==
May 26, 1940

Keio BRB	1–0	Waseda WMW
? ?'

Meiji Jingu Gaien Stadium

== National team ==
=== Results ===
1940.06.16	Japan	1–0	Philippines	Hyogo, Japan
	Kawamoto 67'	JFA		Stadium: Koshien South Ground

=== Players statistics ===
Player	-1939	06.16	1940	Total
Taizo Kawamoto	5(3)	O(1)	1(1)	6(4)
Tokutaro Ukon	4(1)	O	1(0)	5(1)
Kim Yong-sik	2(0)	O	1(0)	3(0)
Yukio Tsuda	0(0)	O	1(0)	1(0)
Kunitaka Sueoka	0(0)	O	1(0)	1(0)
Lee Yoo-hyung	0(0)	O	1(0)	1(0)
Takashi Kasahara	0(0)	O	1(0)	1(0)
Saburo Shinosaki	0(0)	O	1(0)	1(0)
Kazu Naoki	0(0)	O	1(0)	1(0)
Hirokazu Ninomiya	0(0)	O	1(0)	1(0)
Kim Sung-gan	0(0)	O	1(0)	1(0)

== Births ==
- March 14 - Masahiro Hamazaki
- May 28 - Hiroshi Katayama
- June 25 - Shozo Tsugitani
- December 26 - Teruki Miyamoto
