= 1956 in Japanese football =

1956 season

Japanese football in 1956.

== Emperor's Cup ==
May 6, 1956

Keio BRB	4–2	Yawata Steel
? ?' ? ?' ? ?' ? ?'		? ?' ? ?'

Omiya Velodrome

== National team ==
=== Results ===
1956.06.03	Japan	2–0	South Korea	Tokyo, Japan
	Uchino 54'; Iwabuchi 77'	JFA		Stadium: Korakuen Velodrome; Attendance: 10,000

1956.06.10	Japan	0–2	South Korea	Tokyo, Japan
		JFA	? ?' ? ?'	Stadium: Korakuen Velodrome; Attendance: 20,000

1956.11.27	Japan	0–2	Australia	Melbourne, Australia
		JFA	? ?' ? ?'	Attendance: 3,568

=== Players statistics ===
Player	-1955	06.03	06.10	11.27	1956	Total
Toshio Iwatani	7(4)	-	O	-	1(0)	8(4)
Masanori Tokita	7(2)	O	-	O	2(0)	9(2)
Ryuzo Hiraki	7(0)	O	O	O	3(0)	10(0)
Yasuo Kageyama	5(0)	O	O	O	3(0)	(8)0
Hiroaki Sato	5(0)	O	O	O	3(0)	(8)0
Masao Uchino	4(1)	O(1)	O	O	3(1)	7(2)
Isao Iwabuchi	3(1)	O(1)	O	O	3(1)	6(2)
Yoshio Furukawa	0(0)	O	O	O	3(0)	3(0)
Michihiro Ozawa	0(0)	O	O	O	3(0)	3(0)
Waichiro Omura	0(0)	O	O	O	3(0)	3(0)
Shigeo Yaegashi	0(0)	O	O	O	3(0)	3(0)
Tadao Kobayashi	0(0)	O	O	O	3(0)	3(0)

== Births ==
- January 23 - Kazumi Tsubota
- April 2 - Shigemitsu Sudo
- April 10 - Masafumi Yokoyama
- April 24 - Hisashi Kato
- August 25 - Takeshi Okada
- November 21 - Mitsugu Nomura
