= 1940 Emperor's Cup final =

1940 Emperor's Cup Final
Keio BRB	Waseda WMW
1	0
- Date: May 26, 1940
- Venue: Meiji Jingu Gaien Stadium, Tokyo

1940 Emperor's Cup Final was the 20th final of the Emperor's Cup competition. The final was played at Meiji Jingu Gaien Stadium in Tokyo on May 26, 1940. Keio BRB won the championship.

== Overview ==
Keio BRB won the championship, by defeating Waseda WMW 1–0. Keio BRB won the title for 2 years in a row. Keio BRB was featured a squad consisting of Yukio Tsuda, Hirokazu Ninomiya, Saburo Shinosaki and Takashi Kasahara. Waseda WMW was featured a squad consisting of Kunitaka Sueoka, Taizo Kawamoto, Motoo Tatsuhara, Hidetoki Takahashi and Takashi Kano.

== Match details ==
May 26, 1940

Keio BRB	1–0	Waseda WMW
? (?)

Meiji Jingu Gaien Stadium

== See also ==
- 1940 Emperor's Cup
