= 1930 Emperor's Cup final =

1930 Emperor's Cup Final
Kwangaku Club	Keio BRB
3	0
- Date: February 11, 1930
- Venue: Koshien South Ground, Hyōgo

1930 Emperor's Cup Final was the tenth final of the Emperor's Cup competition. The final was played at Koshien South Ground in Hyōgo on February 11, 1930. Kwangaku Club won the championship.

== Overview ==
Defending champion Kwangaku Club won their 2nd title, by defeating Keio BRB 3–0. Kwangaku Club won the title for 2 years in a row. Kwangaku Club was featured a squad consisting of Yukio Goto, Hideo Sakai and Shoichi Nishimura.

== Match details ==
February 11, 1930

Kwangaku Club	3–0	Keio BRB
? (?) ? (?) ? (?)

Koshien South Ground

== See also ==
- 1930 Emperor's Cup
