= 1955 Emperor's Cup final =

1955 Emperor's Cup Final
| All Kwangaku | Chudai Club |
| 4 | 3 |
- Date: May 4, 1955
- Venue: Nishinomiya Stadium, Hyōgo

1955 Emperor's Cup Final was the 35th final of the Emperor's Cup competition. The final was played at Nishinomiya Stadium in Hyōgo on May 4, 1955. All Kwangaku won the championship.

== Overview ==
All Kwangaku won the championship, by defeating Chudai Club 4–3. All Kwangaku was featured a squad consisting of many international footballers, Tomohiko Ikoma, Ryuzo Hiraki, Hiroaki Sato, Shigeo Sugimoto, Takeshi Inoue, Masanori Tokita, Arawa Kimura and Takashi Tokuhiro.

== Match details ==
May 4, 1955

| All Kwangaku | 4–3 | Chudai Club |
|---|---|---|
| ? ?' ? ?' ? ?' ? ?' | | ? ?' ? ?' ? ?' |

Nishinomiya Stadium

== See also ==
- 1955 Emperor's Cup
