= Shoichi Nishimura =

Japanese footballer and manager

Shoichi Nishimura 西邑 昌一
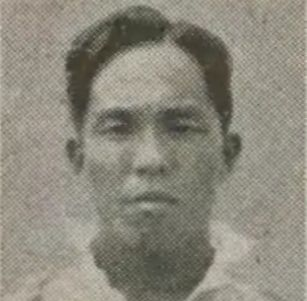
- Shoichi Nishimura, July 1936

Personal information
- Full name: Shoichi Nishimura
- Date of birth: 1912
- Place of birth: Hyogo, Empire of Japan
- Date of death: March 22, 1998 (aged 85–86)
- Place of death: Akashi, Hyogo, Japan
- Height: 1.63 m (5 ft 4 in)
- Position: Forward

Youth career
- Kwansei Gakuin University
- Waseda University

Senior career*
Years	Team	Apps	(Gls)
- Kwangaku Club

International career
1934	Japan	2	(1)

Managerial career
- 1956–????: Kwangaku Club
- 1976–1980: Yomiuri
Medal record
Kwangaku Club
Winner	Emperor's Cup	1930
- * Club domestic league appearances and goals

Shoichi Nishimura (西邑 昌一, Nishimura Shōichi; 1912 – March 22, 1998) was a Japanese football player and manager. He played for Japan national team.

== Club career ==
Nishimura was born in Hyogo Prefecture in 1912. He played for Kwangaku Club was consisted of his alma mater Kwansei Gakuin University players and graduates. He won 1930 Emperor's Cup with Yukio Goto and Hideo Sakai and so on at the club.

== National team career ==
In May 1934, when Nishimura was a Kwansei Gakuin University student, he was selected Japan national team for 1934 Far Eastern Championship Games in Manila. At this competition, on May 13, he debuted against Dutch East Indies. On May 15, he also played and scored a goal against Philippines. He played 2 games and scored 1 goal for Japan in 1934. In 1936, he was also selected Japan for 1936 Summer Olympics in Berlin, but he did not compete. At this competition, Japan completed a come-from-behind victory first game against Sweden. The first victory in Olympics for the Japan and the historic victory over one of the powerhouses became later known as "Miracle of Berlin" (ベルリンの奇跡) in Japan. In 2016, this team was selected Japan Football Hall of Fame.

== Coaching career ==
After retirement, Nishimura became a manager for his alma mater Kwansei Gakuin University and Kwangaku Club. As Kwangaku Club manager, he led the club to won 1958 and 1959 Emperor's Cup. In 1976, he signed with Japan Soccer League Division 2 club Yomiuri. In 1977 season, he led the club to won the championship and promoted Division 1. He resigned in 1980.

On March 22, 1998, Nishimura died of pneumonia in Akashi at the age of 86.

== National team statistics ==
Japan national team
Year	Apps	Goals
1934	2	1
Total	2	1
