= 1925 Emperor's Cup final =

1925 Emperor's Cup Final
| Rijo Shukyu-Dan | Tokyo Imperial University |
| 3 | 0 |
- Date: November 2, 1925
- Venue: Meiji Jingu Gaien Stadium, Tokyo

1925 Emperor's Cup Final was the fifth final of the Emperor's Cup competition. The final was played at Meiji Jingu Gaien Stadium in Tokyo on November 2, 1925. Rijo Shukyu-Dan won the championship.

== Overview ==
Defending champion Rijo Shukyu-Dan with Shizuo Miyama, Naoemon Shimizu and Sachi Kagawa on the team, won their 2nd title, by defeating Tokyo Imperial University with Shigemaru Takenokoshi on the team, 3–0. Rijo Shukyu-Dan won the title for 2 years in a row. Tokyo Imperial University was first Emperor's Cup finalist team as university team.

== Match details ==
November 2, 1925

| Rijo Shukyu-Dan | 3–0 | Tokyo Imperial University |
|---|---|---|
| ? (?) ? (?) ? (?) |

Meiji Jingu Gaien Stadium

== See also ==
- 1925 Emperor's Cup
