= 1929 Emperor's Cup final =

1929 Emperor's Cup Final
Kwangaku Club	Hosei University
3	0
- Date: November 1, 1929
- Venue: Meiji Jingu Gaien Stadium, Tokyo

1929 Emperor's Cup Final was the ninth final of the Emperor's Cup competition. The final was played at Meiji Jingu Gaien Stadium in Tokyo on November 1, 1929. Kwangaku Club won the championship.

== Overview ==
Kwangaku Club won their 1st title, by defeating Hosei University 3–0. Kwangaku Club was featured a squad consisting of Saizo Saito, Yukio Goto and Hideo Sakai.

== Match details ==
November 1, 1929

Kwangaku Club	3–0	Hosei University
? (?) ? (?) ? (?)

Meiji Jingu Gaien Stadium

== See also ==
- 1929 Emperor's Cup
