= 1953 Emperor's Cup final =

1953 Emperor's Cup Final
All Kwangaku	Osaka Club
5	4
- Date: May 5, 1953
- Venue: Nishikyogoku Athletic Stadium, Kyoto

1953 Emperor's Cup Final was the 33rd final of the Emperor's Cup football competition. The final was played at Nishikyogoku Athletic Stadium in Kyoto on May 5, 1953. All Kwangaku won the championship.

== Overview ==
All Kwangaku won the championship, by defeating Osaka Club 5–4. All Kwangaku was featured a squad consisting of Ryuzo Hiraki, Shigeo Sugimoto, Masanori Tokita, Arawa Kimura and Takashi Tokuhiro. Osaka Club was featured a squad consisting of Taizo Kawamoto, Toshio Iwatani, Taro Kagawa and Osamu Yamaji.

== Match details ==
May 5, 1953

All Kwangaku	5–4	Osaka Club
? ?' ? ?' ? ?' ? ?' ? ?'		? ?' ? ?' ? ?' ? ?'

Nishikyogoku Athletic Stadium

== See also ==
- 1953 Emperor's Cup
