= 1924 Emperor's Cup final =

1924 Emperor's Cup Final
Rijo Shukyu-Dan	All Mikage Shihan Club
4	1
- Date: October 31, 1924
- Venue: Meiji Jingu Gaien Stadium, Tokyo

1924 Emperor's Cup Final was the fourth final of the Emperor's Cup competition. The final was played at Meiji Jingu Gaien Stadium in Tokyo on October 31, 1924. Rijo Shukyu-Dan won the championship.

== Overview ==
Rijo Shukyu-Dan won their 1st title, by defeating All Mikage Shihan Club 4–1. Rijo Shukyu-Dan was featured a squad consisting of Shizuo Miyama, Naoemon Shimizu and Sachi Kagawa.

== Match details ==
October 31, 1924

Rijo Shukyu-Dan	4–1	All Mikage Shihan Club
? (?) ? (?) ? (?) ? (?)		? (?)

Meiji Jingu Gaien Stadium

== See also ==
- 1924 Emperor's Cup
