= 1938 Emperor's Cup final =

1938 Emperor's Cup Final
Waseda University	Keio University
4	1
- Date: June 19, 1938
- Venue: Meiji Jingu Gaien Stadium, Tokyo

1938 Emperor's Cup Final was the 18th final of the Emperor's Cup competition. The final was played at Meiji Jingu Gaien Stadium in Tokyo on June 19, 1938. Waseda University won the championship.

== Overview ==
Waseda University won the championship, by defeating Keio University 4–1. Waseda University was featured a squad consisting of Sei Fuwa, Sekiji Sasano, Kunitaka Sueoka, Shogo Kamo and Hidetoki Takahashi.

== Match details ==
June 19, 1938

Waseda University	4–1	Keio University
? (?) ? (?) ? (?) ? (?)		? (?)

Meiji Jingu Gaien Stadium

Waseda University:
GK	(Japan) Sei Fuwa
DF	(Japan) Yoshiomi Yoshida
DF	(Japan) Shuhei Shoda
MF	(Japan) Yoshihiko Shibata
MF	(Japan) Tsuneyoshi Miyake
MF	(Japan) Sekiji Sasano
FW	(Japan) Tokuya Kometani
FW	(Japan) Kunitaka Sueoka
FW	(Japan) Shogo Kamo
FW	(Japan) Yoshimasa Watanabe
FW	(Japan) Hidetoki Takahashi
Substitutes:
Manager:
(Japan) ???

Keio University:
GK	(Japan) Yukio Tsuda
DF	(Japan) Kato
DF	(Japan) Miyakawa
MF	(Japan) Takashi Kasahara
MF	(Japan) Ishikawa
MF	(Japan) Takatori
MF	(Japan) Saburo Shinosaki
FW	(Japan) Watanabe
FW	(Japan) Hirokazu Ninomiya
FW	(Japan) Minoru Obata
FW	(Japan) Inobata
Substitutes:
Manager:
(Japan) ???

== See also ==
- 1938 Emperor's Cup
