= Bunji Kimura =

Japanese footballer and manager

Bunji Kimura 木村 文治
Personal information
- Full name: Bunji Kimura
- Date of birth: July 27, 1944 (age 82)
- Place of birth: Kyoto, Japan

Youth career
- Osaka University of Economics

Senior career*
Years	Team	Apps	(Gls)
1968–1973	Yanmar Diesel	72	(2)
Total		72	(2)

Managerial career
- 1983–1991: Kyoto Shiko
- 1995: Yokohama Flügels
- 1999: Kyoto Purple Sanga (caretaker)
- 2003: Kyoto Purple Sanga (caretaker)
- 2007–2010: FC Suzuka Rampole
Medal record
Yanmar Diesel
Winner	Japan Soccer League	1971
Runner-up	Japan Soccer League	1968
Runner-up	Japan Soccer League	1972
Winner	Emperor's Cup	1968
Winner	Emperor's Cup	1970
Runner-up	Emperor's Cup	1971
Runner-up	Emperor's Cup	1972
- * Club domestic league appearances and goals

Bunji Kimura (木村 文治, Kimura Bunji; born August 27, 1944) is a former Japanese football player and manager.

== Playing career ==
Kimura was born in Kyoto Prefecture on July 27, 1944. After graduating from Osaka University of Economics, he joined Yanmar Diesel in 1968. He retired in 1973.

== Coaching career ==
After retirement, Kimura became a manager for his local club Kyoto Shiko (later Kyoto Purple Sanga) in 1982. In 1991, he became an assistant coach under Shu Kamo at Yokohama Flügels. End of 1994 season, Kamo signed Japan national team manager, Kimura was promoted to manager. During 1995 season, he resigned and remained the club as a staff. End of 1998 season the club was disbanded due to financial strain. He moved to Kyoto Purple Sanga. He also managed as caretaker manager in 1999 and 2003. In June 2004, he left the club. In 2007, he became a manager for FC Suzuka Rampole. In August 2010, he was dismissed.

== Managerial statistics ==
Team	From	To	Record				
Team	From	To	G	W	D	L	Win %
Yokohama Flügels	1995	1995	14	4	0	10	28.57
Kyoto Purple Sanga	2003	2003	4	0	1	3	0.00
Total			18	4	1	13	22.22
