= Tameo Ide =

Japanese footballer

Tameo Ide 井出 多米夫
Personal information
- Full name: Tameo Ide
- Date of birth: November 27, 1908
- Place of birth: Shizuoka, Shizuoka, Empire of Japan
- Date of death: August 17, 1998 (aged 89)
- Place of death: Japan
- Position: Midfielder

Youth career
- Waseda University

Senior career*
Years	Team	Apps	(Gls)
- Tokyo OB Club

International career
1930	Japan	1	(0)
Medal record
Tokyo OB Club
Winner	Emperor's Cup	1933
- * Club domestic league appearances and goals

Tameo Ide (井出 多米夫, Ide Tameo; November 27, 1908 – August 17, 1998) was a Japanese football player. He played for Japan national team.

== Club career ==
Ide was born in Shizuoka on November 27, 1908. He played Tokyo OB Club. He won 1933 Emperor's Cup with Shiro Teshima and Teiichi Matsumaru at the club.

== National team career ==
In May 1930, when Ide was a Waseda University student, he was selected Japan national team for 1930 Far Eastern Championship Games in Tokyo and Japan won the championship. At this competition, on May 25, he debuted against Philippines.

Ide died on August 17, 1998, at the age of 89.

== National team statistics ==
Japan national team
Year	Apps	Goals
1930	1	0
Total	1	0
