= 1927 Emperor's Cup final =

1927 Emperor's Cup Final
Kobe Icchu Club	Rijo Shukyu-Dan
2	0
- Date: October 30, 1927
- Venue: Meiji Jingu Gaien Stadium, Tokyo

1927 Emperor's Cup Final was the seventh final of the Emperor's Cup competition. The final was played at Meiji Jingu Gaien Stadium in Tokyo on October 30, 1927. Kobe Icchu Club won the championship.

== Overview ==
Kobe Icchu Club with Takeo Wakabayashi and Tadao Takayama won their 1st title, by defeating defending champion, Rijo Shukyu-Dan 2–0.

== Match details ==
October 30, 1927

Kobe Icchu Club	2–0	Rijo Shukyu-Dan
? (?) ? (?)

Meiji Jingu Gaien Stadium

== See also ==
- 1927 Emperor's Cup
