= Tokutaro Ukon =

Japanese footballer

Tokutaro Ukon 右近 徳太郎
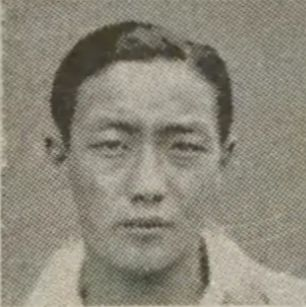
- Tokutaro Ukon, July 1936

Personal information
- Full name: Tokutaro Ukon
- Date of birth: 23 September 1913
- Place of birth: Kobe, Hyogo, Empire of Japan
- Date of death: March 1944 (aged 30)
- Place of death: Bougainville Island, Territory of New Guinea
- Height: 1.73 m (5 ft 8 in)
- Positions: Defender; midfielder; forward

Youth career
- Kobe Daiichi High School
- 1931–1937: Keio University

Senior career*
Years	Team	Apps	(Gls)
- Kobe Club

International career
1934–1940	Japan	5	(1)
Medal record
Keio BRB
Winner	Emperor's Cup	1932
- * Club domestic league appearances and goals

Tokutaro Ukon (右近 徳太郎, Ukon Tokutarō; 23 September 1913 – March 1944) was a Japanese football player. He played for Japan national team.

== Club career ==
Ukon was born in Sumiyoshi, Kobe on 23 September 1913. When he was a Keio University student, he won 1932 Emperor's Cup with Teiichi Matsumaru and so on as a member of Keio BRB was consisted of Keio University players and graduates. He also played for his local club Kobe Club. He played in many positions defender, midfielder and forward.

== National team career ==
In May 1934, when Ukon was a Keio University student, he was selected Japan national team for 1934 Far Eastern Championship Games in Manila. At this competition, on 15 May, he debuted against Philippines. In 1936, he was also selected Japan for 1936 Summer Olympics in Berlin and scored a goal against Sweden. Japan completed a come-from-behind victory against Sweden. The first victory in Olympics for the Japan and the historic victory over one of the powerhouses became later known as "Miracle of Berlin" (ベルリンの奇跡) in Japan. In 2016, this team was selected Japan Football Hall of Fame. He played 5 games and scored 1 goal for Japan until 1940.

Miracle of Berlin (1936 Olympics 1st round v Sweden on 4 August)

== Death ==
In 1942, Ukon served in the military for World War II. In March 1944, he was killed in action in Bougainville Island, Papua New Guinea at the age of 30.

== National team statistics ==
Japan national team
Year	Apps	Goals
1934	2	0
1935	0	0
1936	2	1
1937	0	0
1938	0	0
1939	0	0
1940	1	0
Total	5	1
