= Hiroshi Saeki =

Japanese footballer

Hiroshi Saeki 佐伯 博司
Personal information
- Full name: Hiroshi Saeki
- Date of birth: May 26, 1936 (age 90)
- Place of birth: Hiroshima, Empire of Japan
- Position: Forward

Youth career
- Hiroshima Motomachi High School

Senior career*
Years	Team	Apps	(Gls)
????–1966	Yawata Steel	22	(9)
Total		22	(9)

International career
1958–1961	Japan	4	(0)
Medal record
Yawata Steel
Runner-up	Japan Soccer League	1965
Runner-up	Japan Soccer League	1966
Winner	Emperor's Cup	1964
Runner-up	Emperor's Cup	1956
Runner-up	Emperor's Cup	1958
Runner-up	Emperor's Cup	1965
- * Club domestic league appearances and goals

Hiroshi Saeki (佐伯 博司, Saeki Hiroshi; born May 26, 1936) is a former Japanese football player. He played for Japan national team.

== Club career ==
Saeki was born in Hiroshima Prefecture on May 26, 1936. After graduating from high school, he joined Yawata Steel. In 1965, Yawata Steel joined new league Japan Soccer League. He retired in 1966. He played 22 games and scored 9 goals in the league.

== National team career ==
On December 25, 1958, he debuted for Japan national team against Hong Kong. He played 4 games for Japan until 1961.

== National team statistics ==
Japan national team
Year	Apps	Goals
1958	1	0
1959	1	0
1960	0	0
1961	2	0
Total	4	0
