= Saburo Shinosaki =

Japanese footballer

Saburo Shinosaki 篠崎 三郎
Personal information
- Full name: Saburo Shinosaki
- Place of birth: Empire of Japan
- Position: Forward

Youth career
- Keio University

Senior career*
Years	Team	Apps	(Gls)
- Keio BRB

International career
1940	Japan	1	(0)
Medal record
Keio University
Winner	Emperor's Cup	1937
Keio BRB
Winner	Emperor's Cup	1939
Winner	Emperor's Cup	1940
- * Club domestic league appearances and goals

Saburo Shinosaki (篠崎 三郎, Shinosaki Saburo) was a Japanese football player. He played for Japan national team.

== Club career ==
Shinosaki played for Keio University. He won 1937 Emperor's Cup. He also played for Keio BRB was consisted of his alma mater Keio University players and graduates. He won 1939 and 1940 Emperor's Cup at the club with Yukio Tsuda, Hirokazu Ninomiya and Takashi Kasahara. 1940 Emperor's Cup was the last Emperor's Cup before the war because Emperor's Cup was suspended for World War II from 1941 to 1945.

== National team career ==
On June 16, 1940, when Shinosaki was a Keio University student, he debuted for Japan national team against Philippines and Japan won the match. This match was the first match since 1936 Summer Olympics and the only match in the 1940s in Japan's International A Match due to World War II.

== National team statistics ==
Japan national team
Year	Apps	Goals
1940	1	0
Total	1	0
