= Hiroaki Sato =

Hiroaki Sato may refer to:

- Hiroaki Sato (fighter) (佐藤 弘明, born 1980), Japanese fighter and wrestler with ring name Hikaru Sato
- Hiroaki Sato (figure skater) (佐藤 洸彬, born 1995), Japanese figure skater
- Hiroaki Sato (footballer) (佐藤 弘明, 1932–1988), Japanese footballer
- Hiroaki Sato (translator) (佐藤 紘彰, born 1942), Japanese poet and translator
- Hiroaki Sato (animation director) (born 1959)
