= 1932 Emperor's Cup final =

1932 Emperor's Cup Final
Keio Club	Yoshino Club
5	1
- Date: April 3, 1933
- Venue: Koshien South Ground, Hyōgo

1932 Emperor's Cup Final was the 12th final of the Emperor's Cup competition. The final was played at Koshien South Ground in Hyōgo on April 3, 1933. Keio Club won the championship.

== Overview ==
Keio Club won their 1st title, by defeating Yoshino Club 5–1.

== Match details ==
April 3, 1933

Keio Club	5–1	Yoshino Club
? (?) ? (?) ? (?) ? (?) ? (?)		? (?)

Koshien South Ground

== See also ==
- 1932 Emperor's Cup
