= Sueoka =

Sueoka is a Japanese surname. Notable people with the surname include:

- Ryuji Sueoka (末岡 龍二, born 1979), Japanese footballer
- Kunitaka Sueoka (末岡 圀孝, 1917–1998), Japanese footballer
