= 1972 Emperor's Cup final =

1972 Emperor's Cup Final
Hitachi	Yanmar Diesel
2	1
- Date: January 1, 1973
- Venue: National Stadium, Tokyo

1972 Emperor's Cup Final was the 52nd final of the Emperor's Cup competition. The final was played at National Stadium in Tokyo on January 1, 1973. Hitachi won the championship.

== Overview ==
Hitachi won their 1st title, by defeating Yanmar Diesel 2–1.

== Match details ==
January 1, 1973

Hitachi	2–1	Yanmar Diesel

National Stadium

Hitachi
GK	1	(Japan) Tatsuhiko Seta
DF	3	(Japan) Yoshitada Yamaguchi
DF	12	(Japan) Nobuo Kawakami
DF	4	(Japan) Yoshikazu Nagaoka
DF	17	(Japan) Kazuhisa Kono
DF	6	(Japan) Mutsuhiko Nomura
MF	18	(Japan) Atsuhiro Yoshida
MF	11	(Japan) Shusaku Hirasawa
FW	24	(Japan) Shigeru Takanishi
FW	8	(Japan) Minoru Kobata
FW	13	(Japan) Akira Matsunaga
Manager:
(Japan) Hidetoki Takahashi

Yanmar Diesel
GK	1	(Japan) Nobuhiro Nishikata
DF	14	(Brazil) Carlos
DF	19	(Japan) Eizo Yuguchi
DF	22	(Japan) George Kobayashi
DF	2	(Japan) Shigeru Kitamura
MF	8	(Japan) Daishiro Yoshimura
MF	11	(Japan) Kuniya Mita
MF	16	(Japan) Yushi Matsumura	Substituted off
MF	13	(Japan) Hiroji Imamura
FW	9	(Japan) Kunishige Kamamoto
FW	6	(Japan) Yukio Obata	Substituted off
Substitutes:
MF	5	(Japan) Bunshi Kimura	Substituted on
FW	10	(Japan) Hiroo Abe	Substituted on
Manager:
(Japan) Kenji Onitake

== See also ==
- 1972 Emperor's Cup
