= Takashi Mizuno =

Japanese footballer (born 1931)

Takashi Mizuno 水野 隆
Personal information
- Full name: Takashi Mizuno
- Date of birth: April 28, 1931
- Place of birth: Empire of Japan
- Height: 1.63 m (5 ft 4 in)
- Position: Forward

Youth career
- 1947–1949: Kwansei Gakuin High School
- 1950–1953: Kwansei Gakuin University

Senior career*
Years	Team	Apps	(Gls)
1954–????	Yuasa Batteries		

International career
1955	Japan	1	(0)
Medal record
All Kwangaku
Winner	Emperor's Cup	1953
Winner	Emperor's Cup	1955
Kwangaku Club
Winner	Emperor's Cup	1958
- * Club domestic league appearances and goals

Takashi Mizuno (水野 隆, Mizuno Takashi; born April 28, 1931) (former name; Takashi Tokuhiro, 徳弘 隆) is a Japanese former football player. He played for Japan national team.

== Club career ==
Mizuno was born on April 28, 1931. After graduating from Kwansei Gakuin University, he joined Yuasa Batteries in 1954. He also played for Kwangaku Club was consisted of his alma mater Kwansei Gakuin University players and graduates. he won 1953, 1955 and 1958 Emperor's Cup

== National team career ==
On October 9, 1955, Mizuno debuted for Japan national team against Burma.

== National team statistics ==
Japan national team
Year	Apps	Goals
1955	1	0
Total	1	0
