= 1956 Emperor's Cup final =

1956 Emperor's Cup Final
Keio BRB	Yawata Steel
4	2
- Date: May 6, 1956
- Venue: Omiya Velodrome, Saitama

1956 Emperor's Cup Final was the 36th final of the Emperor's Cup competition. The final was played at Omiya Velodrome in Saitama on May 6, 1956. Keio BRB won the championship.

== Overview ==
Keio BRB won the championship, by defeating Yawata Steel 4–2.

== Match details ==
May 6, 1956

Keio BRB	4–2	Yawata Steel
? ?' ? ?' ? ?' ? ?'		? ?' ? ?'

Omiya Velodrome

== See also ==
- 1956 Emperor's Cup
