= Takashi Kasahara =

Takashi Kasahara may refer to:

- Takashi Kasahara (footballer, born 1918)
- Takashi Kasahara (footballer, born 1988)
