= Saizo Saito =

Japanese footballer

Saizo Saito 斎藤 才三
Personal information
- Full name: Saizo Saito
- Date of birth: September 24, 1908
- Place of birth: Osaka, Empire of Japan
- Date of death: 2004 (aged 95–96)
- Place of death: Japan
- Position: Goalkeeper

Youth career
- Kwansei Gakuin University

Senior career*
Years	Team	Apps	(Gls)
- Kwangaku Club

International career
1930	Japan	2	(0)
Medal record
Kwangaku Club
Winner	Emperor's Cup	1929
- * Club domestic league appearances and goals

Saizo Saito (斎藤 才三, Saitō Saizō; September 24, 1908 – 2004) was a Japanese football player. He played for Japan national team.

== Club career ==
Saito was born in Osaka Prefecture on September 24, 1908. He played for Kwangaku Club was consisted of his alma mater Kwansei Gakuin University players and graduates. At the club, he won 1929 Emperor's Cup with Yukio Goto, Hideo Sakai and so on.

== National team career ==
In May 1930, when Saito was a Kwansei Gakuin University student, he was selected Japan national team for 1930 Far Eastern Championship Games in Tokyo and Japan won the championship. At this competition, on May 25, he debuted against Philippines. On May 29, he also played against Republic of China. He played 2 games for Japan in 1930.

== After retirement ==
After graduating from Kwansei Gakuin University, Saito retired playing career and want to England and studied football at University of Bristol. In 1933, he joined Osaka Mainichi Shimbun and he was engaged in the management and reporting of All Japan High School Soccer Tournament until 1940. After that, he worked at Hino Motors and some affiliates until 1989. He also served as the president at some Hino Motors affiliates.

Saito died in 2004.

== National team statistics ==
Japan national team
Year	Apps	Goals
1930	2	0
Total	2	0
