= 1936 Emperor's Cup final =

1936 Emperor's Cup Final
Keio BRB	Bosung College
3	2
- Date: June 21, 1936
- Venue: Imperial Japanese Army Toyama School Ground, Tokyo

1936 Emperor's Cup Final was the 16th final of the Emperor's Cup competition. The final was played at Imperial Japanese Army Toyama School Ground in Tokyo on June 21, 1936. Keio BRB won the championship.

== Overview ==
Keio BRB won their 2nd title, by defeating Bosung College 3–2. Keio BRB was featured a squad consisting of Yukio Tsuda, Teiichi Matsumaru and Hirokazu Ninomiya.

== Match details ==
June 21, 1936

Keio BRB	3–2	Bosung College
? (?) ? (?) ? (?)		? (?) ? (?)

Imperial Japanese Army Toyama School Ground

== See also ==
- 1936 Emperor's Cup
