= 1958 Emperor's Cup final =

1958 Emperor's Cup Final
Kwangaku Club	Yawata Steel
2	1
- Date: September 9, 1958
- Venue: Fujieda Higashi High School Ground, Shizuoka

1958 Emperor's Cup Final was the 38th final of the Emperor's Cup competition. The final was played at Fujieda Higashi High School Ground in Shizuoka on September 9, 1958. Kwangaku Club won the championship.

== Overview ==
Kwangaku Club won the championship, by defeating Yawata Steel 2–1.

== Match details ==
September 9, 1958

Kwangaku Club	2–1	Yawata Steel
? ?' ? ?'		? ?'

Fujieda Higashi High School Ground

== See also ==
- 1958 Emperor's Cup
