= Osamu Yamaji =

Japanese footballer

Osamu Yamaji 山路 修
Personal information
- Full name: Osamu Yamaji
- Date of birth: 31 August 1929
- Place of birth: Hyōgo Prefecture, Empire of Japan
- Date of death: 26 January 2021 (aged 91)
- Place of death: Yokohama, Kanagawa Prefecture, Japan
- Position: Defender

Youth career
- Kobe Daiichi High School
- Waseda University

Senior career*
Years	Team	Apps	(Gls)
- Sumitomo Metal

International career
1954	Japan	1	(0)
- * Club domestic league appearances and goals

Osamu Yamaji (山路 修, Yamaji Osamu; 31 August 1929 – 26 January 2021) was a Japanese football player. He played for Japan national team.

== Club career ==
Yamaji was born in Hyōgo Prefecture on 31 August 1929. After graduating from Waseda University, he played for Sumitomo Metal. He also played for Osaka SC and won the 2nd place at Emperor's Cup 3 times (1951, 1952 and 1953).

== National team career ==
In March 1954, Yamaji was selected Japan national team for 1954 World Cup qualification. At this qualification, on March 7, he debuted against South Korea.

== National team statistics ==
Japan national team
Year	Apps	Goals
1954	1	0
Total	1	0
