= 1937 Emperor's Cup final =

1937 Emperor's Cup Final
Keio University	Kobe University of Commerce
3	0
- Date: June 13, 1937
- Venue: Meiji Jingu Gaien Stadium, Tokyo

1937 Emperor's Cup Final was the 17th final of the Emperor's Cup competition. The final was played at Meiji Jingu Gaien Stadium in Tokyo on June 13, 1937. Keio University won the championship.

== Overview ==
Keio University won their 3rd championship, by defeating Kobe University of Commerce 3–0, include Hirokazu Ninomiya 2 goals.

== Match details ==
June 13, 1937

Keio University	3–0	Kobe University of Commerce
? (?); Hirokazu Ninomiya (?)

Meiji Jingu Gaien Stadium

== See also ==
- 1937 Emperor's Cup
