= 1971 Emperor's Cup final =

1971 Emperor's Cup Final
Mitsubishi Motors	Yanmar Diesel
3	1
- Date: January 1, 1972
- Venue: National Stadium, Tokyo

1971 Emperor's Cup Final was the 51st final of the Emperor's Cup competition. The final was played at National Stadium in Tokyo on January 1, 1972. Mitsubishi Motors won the championship.

== Overview ==
Mitsubishi Motors won their 1st title, by defeating defending champion Yanmar Diesel 3–1.

== Match details ==
January 1, 1972

Mitsubishi Motors	3–1	Yanmar Diesel
? (?) ? (?) ? (?)		? (?)

National Stadium

== See also ==
- 1971 Emperor's Cup
