= 1975 Emperor's Cup final =

1975 Emperor's Cup Final
Hitachi	Fujita Industries
2	0
- Date: January 1, 1976
- Venue: National Stadium, Tokyo

1975 Emperor's Cup Final was the 55th final of the Emperor's Cup competition. The final was played at National Stadium in Tokyo on January 1, 1976. Hitachi won the championship.

== Overview ==
Hitachi won their 2nd title, by defeating Fujita Industries 2–0. Hitachi was featured a squad consisting of Tatsuhiko Seta, Yoshitada Yamaguchi, Masaki Yokotani, Nobuo Kawakami, Kazuhisa Kono, Minoru Kobata, Akira Matsunaga and Shusaku Hirasawa.

== Match details ==
January 1, 1976

Hitachi	2–0	Fujita Industries
? (?) ? (?)

National Stadium

Hitachi
GK	1	(Japan) Tatsuhiko Seta
DF	3	(Japan) Yoshitada Yamaguchi
DF		(Japan) Masaki Yokotani
DF	12	(Japan) Nobuo Kawakami
DF	17	(Japan) Kazuhisa Kono
MF	18	(Japan) Atsuhiro Yoshida
MF	24	(Japan) Shigeru Takanishi
MF	8	(Japan) Minoru Kobata
MF	7	(Japan) Machida	Substituted off
FW	13	(Japan) Akira Matsunaga
FW	11	(Japan) Shusaku Hirasawa
Substitutes:
MF	32	(Japan) Toshiki Kikuchi	Substituted on
Manager:
(Japan) Hidetoki Takahashi

Fujita Industries
GK	(Japan) Kazuya Sasaki
DF	(Japan) Tanaka
DF	(Japan) Iwashita
DF	(Japan) Keizo Imai
DF	(Japan) Hara
MF	(Japan) Yuji Waki
MF	(Japan) Hidemitsu Hanaoka
MF	(Japan) Mitsuru Komaeda
MF	(Brazil) Luiz Seihan Higa	Substituted off
FW	(Japan) Mitsuo Watanabe
FW	(Japan) Yuichi Kotaki	Substituted off
Substitutes:
GK	(Japan) Naoki Kurimoto
DF	(Brazil) Carvalho	Substituted on
FW	(Japan) Kujime	Substituted on
Manager:
(Japan) Yoshinobu Ishii

== See also ==
- 1975 Emperor's Cup
