= Shigeo Sugimoto =

Japanese footballer

Shigeo Sugimoto 杉本 茂雄
Personal information
- Full name: Shigeo Sugimoto
- Date of birth: December 4, 1926
- Place of birth: Kobe, Hyogo, Japanese Empire
- Date of death: April 2, 2002 (aged 75)
- Place of death: Nishinomiya, Hyogo, Japan
- Position: Midfielder

Youth career
- ????: Kobe Daiichi High School
- ????–1947: Kwansei Gakuin University

Senior career*
Years	Team	Apps	(Gls)
1948–????	Hankyu Railways		

International career
1951–1954	Japan	3	(0)
Medal record
All Kwangaku
Winner	Emperor's Cup	1950
Winner	Emperor's Cup	1953
Winner	Emperor's Cup	1955
Representing Japan
Asian Games
Bronze medal – third place	1951 New Delhi	Team
- * Club domestic league appearances and goals

Shigeo Sugimoto (杉本 茂雄, Sugimoto Shigeo; December 4, 1926 – April 2, 2002) was a Japanese football player. He played for Japan national team.

== Club career ==
Sugimoto was born in Kobe on December 4, 1926. After graduating from Kwansei Gakuin University, he joined Hankyu Railways in 1948. He also played for Kwangaku Club was consisted of his alma mater Kwansei Gakuin University players and graduates. At the club, he won 1950, 1953 and 1955 Emperor's Cup.

== National team career ==
In March 1951, Sugimoto was selected Japan national team for Japan team first game after World War II, 1951 Asian Games. At this competition, on March 7, he debuted against Iran. He played 3 games for Japan until 1954.

On April 2, 2002, Sugimoto died of kidney failure in Nishinomiya at the age of 75.

== National team statistics ==
Japan national team
Year	Apps	Goals
1951	2	0
1952	0	0
1953	0	0
1954	1	0
Total	3	0

== Honours ==
Japan

- Asian Games Bronze medal: 1951
