= Arawa Kimura =

Japanese footballer

Arawa Kimura 木村 現
Personal information
- Full name: Arawa Kimura
- Date of birth: July 8, 1931
- Place of birth: Hiroshima, Hiroshima, Empire of Japan
- Date of death: February 21, 2007 (aged 75)
- Place of death: Ebina, Kanagawa, Japan
- Position: Forward

Youth career
- Hiroshima Normal School
- Kwansei Gakuin University

Senior career*
Years	Team	Apps	(Gls)
- Kwangaku Club
- Chudai Club

International career
1954–1955	Japan	6	(1)
Medal record
All Kwangaku
Winner	Emperor's Cup	1950
Winner	Emperor's Cup	1953
Winner	Emperor's Cup	1955
Chudai Club
Winner	Emperor's Cup	1957
- * Club domestic league appearances and goals

Arawa Kimura (木村 現, Kimura Arawa; July 8, 1931 – February 21, 2007) was a Japanese football player. He played for Japan national team.

== Club career ==
Kimura was born in Hiroshima on July 8, 1931. He played for Kwangaku Club was consisted of his alma mater Kwansei Gakuin University players and graduates. He also played for Chudai Club was consisted of Chuo University players and graduates. He won 1950, 1953 and 1955 Emperor's Cup as a member of All Kwangaku and 1957 Emperor's Cup at Chudai Club.

== National team career ==
In March 1954, Kimura was selected Japan national team for 1954 World Cup qualification. At this qualification, on March 7, he debuted against South Korea. He also played at 1954 Asian Games. He played 6 games and scored 1 goal for Japan until 1955.

On February 21, 2007, Kimura died in Ebina at the age of 75.

== National team statistics ==
Japan national team
Year	Apps	Goals
1954	2	0
1955	4	1
Total	6	1
