= 1976 Emperor's Cup final =

1976 Emperor's Cup Final
Furukawa Electric	Yanmar Diesel
4	1
- Date: January 1, 1977
- Venue: National Stadium, Tokyo

1976 Emperor's Cup Final was the 56th final of the Emperor's Cup competition. The final was played at National Stadium in Tokyo on January 1, 1977. Furukawa Electric won the championship.

== Overview ==
Furukawa Electric won their 4th title, by defeating Yanmar Diesel 4–1. Furukawa Electric was featured a squad consisting of Choei Sato, Shigemi Ishii, Eijun Kiyokumo, Kozo Arai, Takashi Kuwahara, Yoshikazu Nagai and Yasuhiko Okudera.

== Match details ==
January 1, 1977

Furukawa Electric	4–1	Yanmar Diesel
? (?) ? (?) ? (?) ? (?)		? (?)

National Stadium

Furukawa Electric
GK	(Japan) Choei Sato
DF	(Japan) Shigemi Ishii
DF	(Japan) Eijun Kiyokumo
DF	(Japan) Kozo Arai
DF	(Japan) Moichi Kiguchi
MF	(Japan) Akio Tanabe
MF	(Japan) Takeshi Kuwahara
MF	(Japan) Koichi Susa
FW	(Japan) Yoshikazu Nagai
MF	(Japan) Osamu Kawamoto	Substituted off
FW	(Japan) Yasuhiko Okudera
Substitutes:
DF	(Japan) Tadahisa Onizuka	Substituted on Substituted off
FW	(Japan) Kaoru Tokita	Substituted on
Manager:
(Japan) Aritatsu Ogi

Yanmar Diesel
GK	1	(Japan) Teruhisa Kakiuchi
DF	13	(Japan) Hiroshi Sakano
DF	5	(Japan) George Kobayashi
DF	3	(Japan) Masahiro Hamatama
DF	12	(Japan) Toshio Mizuguchi
MF	8	Daishiro Yoshimura
MF	4	(Japan) Yushi Matsumura
FW	6	(Japan) Yukio Obata	Substituted off
FW	7	(Japan) Hiroji Imamura
FW	9	(Japan) Kunishige Kamamoto
FW	11	(Japan) Hiroo Abe
Substitutes:
FW	20	(Japan) Kazuo Uenishi	Substituted on
Manager:
(Japan) Kenji Onitake

== See also ==
- 1976 Emperor's Cup
