= Isao Iwabuchi =

Japanese footballer

Isao Iwabuchi 岩淵 功
Personal information
- Full name: Isao Iwabuchi
- Date of birth: November 17, 1933
- Place of birth: Tochigi, Empire of Japan
- Date of death: April 16, 2003 (aged 69)
- Place of death: Tokyo, Japan
- Height: 1.72 m (5 ft 7 1/2 in)
- Position: Forward

Youth career
- Utsunomiya High School
- ????–1955: Keio University

Senior career*
Years	Team	Apps	(Gls)
1956–????	Keio BRB		

International career
1955–1958	Japan	8	(2)
Medal record
Keio BRB
Winner	Emperor's Cup	1954
Winner	Emperor's Cup	1956
- * Club domestic league appearances and goals

Isao Iwabuchi (岩淵 功, Iwabuchi Isao; November 17, 1933 – April 16, 2003) was a Japanese football player. He played for Japan national team.

== Club career ==
Iwabuchi was born in Tochigi Prefecture on November 17, 1933. He played for Keio BRB was consisted of his alma mater Keio University players and graduates. He won 1954 and 1956 Emperor's Cup at the club.

== National team career ==
On January 5, 1955, when Iwabuchi was a Keio University student, he debuted for Japan national team against Burma. In June 1956, at 1956 Summer Olympics qualification against South Korea, he scored a goal. After the qualification, Japan won the qualification to 1956 Summer Olympics in Melbourne by the drawing of lots. In November, he was selected Japan for 1956 Olympics. He also played at 1958 Asian Games. He played 8 games and scored 2 goals for Japan until 1958.

On April 16, 2003, Iwabuchi died of peritonitis in Tokyo at the age of 69.

== National team statistics ==
Japan national team
Year	Apps	Goals
1955	3	1
1956	3	1
1957	0	0
1958	2	0
Total	8	2
