= 1959 Emperor's Cup final =

1959 Emperor's Cup Final
Kwangaku Club	Chuo University
1	0
- Date: May 6, 1959
- Venue: Koishikawa Football Stadium, Tokyo

1959 Emperor's Cup Final was the 39th final of the Emperor's Cup competition. The final was played at Koishikawa Football Stadium in Tokyo on May 6, 1959. Kwangaku Club won the championship.

== Overview ==
Defending champion Kwangaku Club won the championship, by defeating Chuo University 1–0. Kwangaku Club won the title for 2 years in a row.

== Match details ==
May 6, 1959

Kwangaku Club	1–0	Chuo University
? (?)

Koishikawa Football Stadium

== See also ==
- 1959 Emperor's Cup
