= 1931 Emperor's Cup final =

1931 Emperor's Cup Final
Imperial University of Tokyo LB	Kobun Junior High School
5	1
- Date: October 31, 1931
- Venue: Meiji Jingu Gaien Stadium, Tokyo

1931 Emperor's Cup Final was the 11th final of the Emperor's Cup competition. The final was played at Meiji Jingu Gaien Stadium in Tokyo on October 31, 1931. Imperial University of Tokyo LB won the championship.

== Overview ==
Imperial University of Tokyo LB won their 1st title, by defeating Kobun Junior High School 5–1.

== Match details ==
October 31, 1931

Imperial University of Tokyo LB	5–1	Kobun Junior High School
? (?) ? (?) ? (?) ? (?) ? (?)		? (?)

Meiji Jingu Gaien Stadium

== See also ==
- 1931 Emperor's Cup
