= 1970 Emperor's Cup final =

1970 Emperor's Cup Final
Yanmar Diesel	Toyo Industries
2	1
- Date: January 1, 1971
- Venue: National Stadium, Tokyo

1970 Emperor's Cup Final was the 50th final of the Emperor's Cup competition. The final was played at National Stadium in Tokyo on January 1, 1971. Yanmar Diesel won the championship.

== Overview ==
Yanmar Diesel won their 2nd title, by defeating defending champion Toyo Industries 2–1. Yanmar Diesel was featured a squad consisting of Kunishige Kamamoto, Daishiro Yoshimura and Eizo Yuguchi.

== Match details ==
January 1, 1971

Yanmar Diesel	2–1 (a.e.t.)	Toyo Industries
Kunishige Kamamoto (?); Kunishige Kamamoto (?)		? (?)

National Stadium

1970 Emperor's Cup
(Japan)
Yanmar Diesel
2 title

== See also ==
- 1970 Emperor's Cup
