= Takashi Kasahara (footballer, born 1918) =

Japanese footballer

Takashi Kasahara 笠原 隆
Personal information
- Full name: Takashi Kasahara
- Date of birth: 26 March 1918
- Place of birth: Empire of Japan
- Position: Midfielder

Youth career
- Keio University

Senior career*
Years	Team	Apps	(Gls)
- Keio BRB

International career
1940	Japan	1	(0)
Medal record
Keio University
Winner	Emperor's Cup	1937
Keio BRB
Winner	Emperor's Cup	1939
Winner	Emperor's Cup	1940
- * Club domestic league appearances and goals

Takashi Kasahara (笠原 隆, Kasahara Takashi; born 26 March 1918) was a Japanese football player. He played for the Japan national team.

== Club career ==
Kasahara was born on 26 March 1918. He played for Keio University. He won the 1937 Emperor's Cup. He also played for Keio BRB, which consisted of his fellow alumni players and graduates of Keio University. He won the 1939 and 1940 Emperor's Cups at the club with Yukio Tsuda, Hirokazu Ninomiya, and Saburo Shinosaki. The 1940 Emperor's Cup was the last Emperor's Cup before the war; the Emperor's Cup was suspended during World War II, from 1941 to 1945.

== National team career ==
On 16 June 1940, when Kasahara was a Keio University student, he debuted for Japan national team against Philippines and Japan won the match. This match was the first match since 1936 Summer Olympics and the only match in the 1940s in Japan's International A Match due to World War II.

== National team statistics ==
Japan national team
Year	Apps	Goals
1940	1	0
Total	1	0
