= Teiichi Matsumaru =

Japanese footballer

Teiichi Matsumaru 松丸 貞一
Personal information
- Full name: Teiichi Matsumaru
- Date of birth: February 28, 1909
- Place of birth: Bunkyo, Tokyo, Empire of Japan
- Date of death: January 6, 1997 (aged 87)
- Place of death: Japan
- Position: Midfielder

Youth career
- Keio University

Senior career*
Years	Team	Apps	(Gls)
- Keio BRB
- Tokyo OB Club

International career
1934	Japan	3	(0)
Medal record
Keio BRB
Winner	Emperor's Cup	1932
Winner	Emperor's Cup	1936
Tokyo OB Club
Winner	Emperor's Cup	1933
- * Club domestic league appearances and goals

Teiichi Matsumaru (松丸 貞一, Matsumaru Teiichi; February 28, 1909 – January 6, 1997) was a Japanese football player. He played for Japan national team.

== Club career ==
Matsumaru was born in Bunkyo, Tokyo on February 28, 1909. He played for Keio BRB was consisted of his alma mater Keio University players and graduates. At Keio BRB, he won 1932 and 1936 Emperor's Cup. He also played for Tokyo OB Club and won 1933 Emperor's Cup with Shigemaru Takenokoshi and Shiro Teshima.

== National team career ==
In May 1934, Matsumaru was selected Japan national team for 1934 Far Eastern Championship Games in Manila. At this competition, on May 13, he debuted against Dutch East Indies. He also played against Philippines and Republic of China. He played 3 games for Japan in 1934.

Matsumaru died on January 6, 1997, at the age of 87. In 2015, he was selected Japan Football Hall of Fame.

== National team statistics ==
Japan national team
Year	Apps	Goals
1934	3	0
Total	3	0

== Honours ==
- Japan Football Hall of Fame: Inducted in 2015
