= Kazu Naoki =

Japanese footballer

Kazu Naoki 直木 和
Personal information
- Full name: Kazu Naoki
- Date of birth: March 23, 1918
- Place of birth: Empire of Japan
- Date of death: 1940s
- Position: Forward

Youth career
- Kobe Daiichi High School
- Tokyo Imperial University

International career
Years	Team	Apps	(Gls)
1940	Japan	1	(0)

Kazu Naoki (直木 和, Naoki Kazu; March 23, 1918 – 1940s) was a Japanese football player. He played for Japan national team.

== National team career ==
Naoki was born on March 23, 1918. On June 16, 1940, when he was a Tokyo Imperial University student, he debuted for Japan national team against Philippines and Japan won the match. This match was the first match since 1936 Summer Olympics and the only match in the 1940s in Japan's International A Match due to World War II. Naoki died in an accident immediately after World War II.

== National team statistics ==
Japan national team
Year	Apps	Goals
1940	1	0
Total	1	0
