= Waseda University Higashi-Fusimi Ground =

Athletic stadium in Tokyo, Japan

- 早稲田大学東伏見運動場
- Interactive map of Waseda University Higashi-Fusimi Ground
- Location: Tokyo, Japan
- Coordinates: 35.72772°N 139.56424°E

Waseda University Higashi-Fusimi Ground (早稲田大学東伏見運動場) is an athletic stadium in Tokyo, Japan.

It hosted the 1949 Emperor's Cup and final game between University of Tokyo LB and Kandai Club was played there on June 5, 1949.
