= 1935 Emperor's Cup final =

1935 Emperor's Cup Final
Kyungsung FC	Tokyo Bunri University
6	1
- Date: June 2, 1935
- Venue: Meiji Jingu Gaien Stadium, Tokyo

1935 Emperor's Cup Final was the 15th final of the Emperor's Cup competition. The final was played at Meiji Jingu Gaien Stadium in Tokyo on June 2, 1935. Kyungsung FC won the championship.

== Overview ==
Kyungsung FC won their 1st title, by defeating Tokyo Bunri University 6–1. Kyungsung FC was featured a squad consisting of Kim Yong-sik, Lee Yoo-hyung and Kim Sung-gan.

== Match details ==
June 2, 1935

Kyungsung FC	6–1	Tokyo Bunri University
? (?) ? (?) ? (?) ? (?) ? (?) ? (?)		? (?)

Meiji Jingu Gaien Stadium

== See also ==
- 1935 Emperor's Cup
