= 1952 Emperor's Cup final =

1952 Emperor's Cup Final
All Keio	Osaka Club
6	2
- Date: May 6, 1952
- Venue: Fujieda Higashi High School Ground, Shizuoka

1952 Emperor's Cup Final was the 32nd final of the Emperor's Cup competition. The final was played at Fujieda Higashi High School Ground in Shizuoka on May 6, 1952. All Keio won the championship.

== Overview ==
All Keio won the championship, by defeating Osaka Club 6–2. All Keio was featured a squad consisting of Yukio Tsuda, Ken Noritake, Hirokazu Ninomiya, Tadao Kobayashi and Yoshinori Shigematsu.

== Match details ==
May 6, 1952

All Keio	6–2	Osaka Club
? ?' ? ?' ? ?' ? ?' ? ?' ? ?'		? ?' ? ?'

Fujieda Higashi High School Ground

== See also ==
- 1952 Emperor's Cup
