= 1973 Emperor's Cup final =

1973 Emperor's Cup Final
Mitsubishi Motors	Hitachi
2	1
- Date: January 1, 1974
- Venue: National Stadium, Tokyo

1973 Emperor's Cup Final was the 53rd final of the Emperor's Cup competition. The final was played at National Stadium in Tokyo on January 1, 1974. Mitsubishi Motors won the championship.

== Overview ==
Mitsubishi Motors won their 2nd title, by defeating defending champion Hitachi 2–1.

== Match details ==
January 1, 1974

Mitsubishi Motors	2–1	Hitachi
? (?) ? (?)		? (?)

National Stadium

Mitsubishi Motors
GK	(Japan) Mitsuhisa Taguchi
DF	(Japan) Yoshio Kikugawa
DF	(Japan) Hiroshi Ochiai
DF	(Japan) Kuniya Daini
DF	(Japan) Katsumi Murakoshi
MF	(Japan) Eiichi Otani
MF	(Japan) Kenji Okubo
MF	(Japan) Michio Ashikaga
MF	(Japan) Kazumi Takada
FW	(Japan) Ichiro Hosotani
FW	(Japan) Ryuchi Sugiyama
Substitutes:
Manager:
(Japan) Hiroshi Ninomiya

Hitachi
GK	1	(Japan) Tatsuhiko Seta
DF	3	(Japan) Yoshitada Yamaguchi
DF	12	(Japan) Nobuo Kawakami
DF	4	(Japan) Yoshikazu Nagaoka
DF	17	(Japan) Kazuhisa Kono
DF	6	(Japan) Mutsuhiko Nomura
MF	18	(Japan) Atsuhiro Yoshida
MF	24	(Japan) Shigeru Takanishi
FW	8	(Japan) Minoru Kobata	Substituted off
FW	13	(Japan) Akira Matsunaga	Substituted off
FW	11	(Japan) Shusaku Hirasawa
Substitutes:
FW	32	(Japan) Toshio Kikuchi	Substituted on
MF	16	(Japan) Shigeo Asai	Substituted on
Manager:
(Japan) Hidetoki Takahashi

== See also ==
- 1973 Emperor's Cup
