= 1939 Emperor's Cup final =

1939 Emperor's Cup Final
Keio BRB	Waseda University
3	2
- Date: June 11, 1939
- Venue: Meiji Jingu Gaien Stadium, Tokyo

1939 Emperor's Cup Final was the 19th final of the Emperor's Cup competition. The final was played at Meiji Jingu Gaien Stadium in Tokyo on June 11, 1939. Keio BRB won the championship.

== Overview ==
Keio BRB won the championship, by defeating defending champion Waseda University 3–2.

== Match details ==
June 11, 1939

Keio BRB	3–2	Waseda University
? (?); Hirokazu Ninomiya (?) ? (?)		? (?) ? (?)

Meiji Jingu Gaien Stadium

== See also ==
- 1939 Emperor's Cup
