= 1933 Emperor's Cup final =

1933 Emperor's Cup Final
| Tokyo OB Club | Sendai SC |
| 4 | 1 |
- Date: October 30, 1933
- Venue: Meiji Jingu Gaien Stadium, Tokyo

1933 Emperor's Cup Final was the 13th final of the Emperor's Cup competition. The final was played at Meiji Jingu Gaien Stadium in Tokyo on October 30, 1933. Tokyo OB Club won the championship.

== Overview ==
Tokyo OB Club won their 1st title, by defeating Sendai SC 4–1.

== Match details ==
October 30, 1933

| Tokyo OB Club | 4–1 | Sendai SC |
|---|---|---|
| ? (?) ? (?) ? (?) ? (?) | | ? (?) |

Meiji Jingu Gaien Stadium

== See also ==
- 1933 Emperor's Cup
