= Hiroaki Sato (footballer) =

Japanese footballer

Hiroaki Sato 佐藤 弘明
Personal information
- Full name: Hiroaki Sato
- Date of birth: February 5, 1932
- Place of birth: Amagasaki, Hyogo, Empire of Japan
- Date of death: January 1, 1988 (aged 55)
- Place of death: Japan
- Position: Midfielder

Youth career
- Amagasaki High School
- 1951–1954: Kwansei Gakuin University

Senior career*
Years	Team	Apps	(Gls)
1955–????	Kwangaku Club		

International career
1955–1959	Japan	15	(0)
Medal record
All Kwangaku
Winner	Emperor's Cup	1955
Kwangaku Club
Winner	Emperor's Cup	1958
Winner	Emperor's Cup	1959
- * Club domestic league appearances and goals

Hiroaki Sato (佐藤 弘明, Satō Hiroaki; February 5, 1932 – January 1, 1988) was a Japanese football player. He played for Japan national team.

== Club career ==
Sato was born in Amagasaki on February 5, 1932. After graduating from Kwansei Gakuin University, he played for Kwangaku Club was consisted of his alma mater Kwansei Gakuin University players and graduates. He won 1955, 1958 and 1959 Emperor's Cup.

== National team career ==
On January 2, 1955, when Sato was a Kwansei Gakuin University student, he debuted for Japan national team against Burma. In 1956, he was selected Japan for 1956 Summer Olympics in Melbourne. He also played at 1958 Asian Games. He played 15 games for Japan until 1959.

Sato died on January 1, 1988, at the age of 55.

== National team statistics ==
Japan national team
Year	Apps	Goals
1955	5	0
1956	3	0
1957	0	0
1958	4	0
1959	3	0
Total	15	0
