= 1961 Emperor's Cup final =

1961 Emperor's Cup Final
Furukawa Electric	Chuo University
3	2
- Date: May 7, 1961
- Venue: Fujieda Higashi High School Ground, Shizuoka

1961 Emperor's Cup Final was the 41st final of the Emperor's Cup competition. The final was played at Fujieda Higashi High School Ground in Shizuoka on May 7, 1961. Furukawa Electric won the championship.

== Overview ==
Defending champion Furukawa Electric won their 2nd title, by defeating Chuo University 3–2. Furukawa Electric won the title for 2 years in a row.

== Match details ==
May 7, 1961

Furukawa Electric	3–2	Chuo University
? ?' ? ?' ? ?'		? ?' ? ?'

Fujieda Higashi High School Ground

== See also ==
- 1961 Emperor's Cup
