= 1962 Emperor's Cup final =

1962 Emperor's Cup Final
Chuo University	Furukawa Electric
2	1
- Date: May 6, 1962
- Venue: Nishikyogoku Athletic Stadium, Kyoto

1962 Emperor's Cup Final was the 42nd final of the Emperor's Cup competition. The final was played at Nishikyogoku Athletic Stadium in Kyoto on May 6, 1962. Chuo University won the championship.

== Overview ==
Chuo University won the championship, by defeating defending champion Furukawa Electric 2–1.

== Match details ==
May 6, 1962

Chuo University	2–1	Furukawa Electric
? ?' ? ?'		? ?'

Nishikyogoku Athletic Stadium

== See also ==
- 1962 Emperor's Cup
