= Naoemon Shimizu =

Japanese footballer

Naoemon Shimizu 清水 直右衛門
Personal information
- Full name: Naoemon Shimizu
- Place of birth: Hiroshima, Empire of Japan
- Date of death: August 6, 1945
- Place of death: Hiroshima, Hiroshima, Empire of Japan
- Position: Forward

Youth career
- Hiroshima Daiichi High School
- Kobe Higher Commercial School

Senior career*
| Years | Team | Apps | (Gls) |
- Rijo Shukyu-Dan

International career
| 1923 | Japan | 2 | (1) |
Medal record
Rijo Shukyu-Dan
| Winner | Emperor's Cup | 1924 |
| Winner | Emperor's Cup | 1925 |
- * Club domestic league appearances and goals

Naoemon Shimizu (清水 直右衛門, Shimizu Naoemon; c.1900 or 1901 – August 6, 1945) was a Japanese football player. He was an early member to play for the Japan national team, just two years after the national team's formation in 1921.

== Club career ==
Shimizu was born in Hiroshima Prefecture. He played for his local club Rijo Shukyu-Dan where he won both the 1924 and the 1925 Emperor's Cup with his fellow club and national teammates Shizuo Miyama and Sachi Kagawa.

== National team career ==
In May 1923, Shimizu was selected to play for the Japan national team at the 1923 Far Eastern Championship Games in Osaka. At this competition, on May 23, he debuted against the Philippines. This match would be Japan's first International A Match featuring a first team. The next day, Shimizu played and scored a goal against the Republic of China; Japan would lose both matches (1-2, v Philippines and 1-5, v Republic of China). Shimizu would only feature twice for Japan.

== After retirement ==
After retirement, Shimizu kept a kimono shop in Hiroshima. On August 6, 1945, he (aged 44) died with his wife (aged 38) due to the Atomic bombings of Hiroshima and Nagasaki.

== National team statistics ==
Japan national team
| Year | Apps | Goals |
|---|---|---|
| 1923 | 2 | 1 |
| Total | 2 | 1 |
