= George Kobayashi =

Japanese footballer

George Kobayashi 小林 ジョージ
Personal information
- Full name: George Kobayashi
- Date of birth: November 29, 1947 (age 78)
- Place of birth: São Paulo, Brazil
- Height: 1.73 m (5 ft 8 in)
- Position: Midfielder

Senior career*
Years	Team	Apps	(Gls)
1971–1976	Yanmar Diesel	92	(7)
Total		92	(7)

International career
1972	Japan	3	(0)
Medal record
Yanmar Diesel
Winner	Japan Soccer League	1971
Winner	Japan Soccer League	1974
Winner	Japan Soccer League	1975
Runner-up	Japan Soccer League	1972
Winner	Emperor's Cup	1974
Runner-up	Emperor's Cup	1971
Runner-up	Emperor's Cup	1972
Runner-up	Emperor's Cup	1976
- * Club domestic league appearances and goals

George Kobayashi (小林 ジョージ, Kobayashi George; born November 29, 1947) is a former Japanese footballer. He played as a midfielder for Japan national team.

== Club career ==
Kobayashi was born in São Paulo, Brazil on November 29, 1947. He moved to Japan and joined Yanmar Diesel in 1971. The club won the league championship in 1971, 1974, and 1975. The club also won the 1974 Emperor's Cup. He retired in 1976. He played 92 games and scored 7 goals in the league. He was selected Best Eleven in 1974 and 1975.

== National team career ==
On July 16, 1972, Kobayashi debuted for Japan national team against Sri Lanka. He played 3 games for Japan in 1972.

== National team statistics ==
Japan national team
Year	Apps	Goals
1972	3	0
Total	3	0

== Awards ==
- Japan Soccer League Best Eleven: 1974, 1975
