= Lee Yoo-hyung =

Korean footballer

Personal information
- Full name: Lee Yoo-hyung
- Date of birth: 21 January 1911
- Place of birth: Sinchon, Kōkai-dō, Korea, Empire of Japan
- Date of death: 29 January 2003 (aged 92)
- Place of death: Seoul, South Korea
- Position: Midfielder

Senior career*
Years	Team	Apps	(Gls)
- Keijo SC

International career
1940	Japan	1	(0)
1948	South Korea	1	(0)

Managerial career
- 1945–1947: KFA (Executive Committee)
- 1948–1952: KFA (Executive Committee)
- 1952–1954: KFA (Chief Executive Committee)
- 1954: South Korea
- 1955–1956: KFA (Executive Committee)
- 1956–1957: KFA (Chief Executive Committee)
- 1956–1958: South Korea
- 1960–1961: KFA (Executive Committee)
- 1961: South Korea
- 1962–1964: KFA (Executive Committee)
- 1968: KFA (Executive Committee)
Medal record
South Korea (as manager)
AFC Asian Cup
Bronze medal – third place	1964 Israel	Team
Asian Games
Silver medal – second place	1954 Manila	Team
- * Club domestic league appearances and goals

Lee Yoo-hyung (Korean: 이유형, 21 January 1911 – 29 January 2003) was a South Korean football player and manager. He has played for Japan national team and South Korea national team. He was part of South Korea's squad for the 1948 Summer Olympics, but he did not play in any matches. He also played Kyungsung FC. He started coaching career before the Korean War. After the war, he managed South Korea national football team several times.

== National team statistics ==
Japan national team
Year	Apps	Goals
1940	1	0
Total	1	0
