= Shizuo Miyama =

Japanese footballer

Shizuo Sugoma 深山 静夫
Personal information
- Full name: Shizuo Miyama
- Place of birth: Hiroshima, Empire of Japan
- Position: Defender

Youth career
- Hiroshima High School
- Keio University

Senior career*
Years	Team	Apps	(Gls)
- Rijo Shukyu-Dan

International career
1923	Japan	2	(0)
Medal record
Rijo Shukyu-Dan
Winner	Emperor's Cup	1924
Winner	Emperor's Cup	1925
- * Club domestic league appearances and goals

Shizuo Miyama (深山 静夫, Miyama Shizuo) was a Japanese football player. He played for Japan national team.

== Club career ==
Miyama was born in Hiroshima Prefecture. After graduating from Keio University, he played for his local club Rijo Shukyu-Dan. He won 1924 and 1925 Emperor's Cup with international players Naoemon Shimizu and Sachi Kagawa.

== National team career ==
In May 1923, Miyama was selected Japan national team for 1923 Far Eastern Championship Games in Osaka. At this competition, on May 23, he debuted against Philippines. This match is Japan team first match in International A Match. Next day, he also played against Republic of China. But Japan lost in both matches (1-2, v Philippines and 1-5, v Republic of China). He played 2 games for Japan in 1923.

== National team statistics ==
Japan national team
Year	Apps	Goals
1923	2	0
Total	2	0
