= 1994 Emperor's Cup final =

1994 Emperor's Cup Final
Bellmare Hiratsuka	Cerezo Osaka
2	0
- Date: January 1, 1995
- Venue: National Stadium, Tokyo

1994 Emperor's Cup Final was the 74th final of the Emperor's Cup competition. The final was played at National Stadium in Tokyo on January 1, 1995. Bellmare Hiratsuka won the championship.

== Overview ==
Bellmare Hiratsuka won their 3rd title, by defeating Cerezo Osaka 2–0 with Koji Noguchi 2 goals.

== Match details ==
January 1, 1995

Bellmare Hiratsuka	2–0	Cerezo Osaka
Koji Noguchi 47', 86'

National Stadium

== See also ==
- 1994 Emperor's Cup
