= 1989 Emperor's Cup final =

1989 Emperor's Cup Final
Nissan Motors	Yamaha Motors
3	2
- Date: January 1, 1990
- Venue: National Stadium, Tokyo

1989 Emperor's Cup Final was the 69th final of the Emperor's Cup competition. The final was played at National Stadium in Tokyo on January 1, 1990. Nissan Motors won the championship.

== Overview ==
Defending champion Nissan Motors won their 4th title, by defeating Yamaha Motors 3–2. Nissan Motors was featured a squad consisting of Shigetatsu Matsunaga, Tetsuji Hashiratani, Kazushi Kimura, Nobutoshi Kaneda and Takashi Mizunuma.

== Match details ==
January 1, 1990

Nissan Motors	3–2	Yamaha Motors
Lopes (?); Renato (?); Kazushi Kimura (?)		? (?) ? (?)

National Stadium

== See also ==
- 1989 Emperor's Cup
