= 1982 Emperor's Cup final =

1982 Emperor's Cup Final
Yamaha Motors	Fujita Industries
1	0
- Date: January 1, 1983
- Venue: National Stadium, Tokyo

1982 Emperor's Cup Final was the 62nd final of the Emperor's Cup competition. The final was played at National Stadium in Tokyo on January 1, 1983. Yamaha Motors won the championship.

== Overview ==
Yamaha Motors won their 1st title, by defeating Fujita Industries 1–0.

== Match details ==
January 1, 1983

Yamaha Motors	1–0	Fujita Industries
Mitsunori Yoshida (?)

National Stadium

== See also ==
- 1982 Emperor's Cup
