= 1949 Emperor's Cup final =

1949 Emperor's Cup Final
| University of Tokyo LB | Kandai Club |
| 5 | 2 |
- Date: June 5, 1949
- Venue: Waseda University Higashi-Fusimi Ground, Tokyo

1949 Emperor's Cup Final was the 29th final of the Emperor's Cup competition. The final was played at Waseda University Higashi-Fusimi Ground in Tokyo on June 5, 1949. University of Tokyo LB won the championship.

== Overview ==
Defending champion University of Tokyo LB won the championship, by defeating Kandai Club 5–2.

== Match details ==
June 5, 1949

| University of Tokyo LB | 5–2 | Kandai Club |
|---|---|---|
| ? (?) ? (?) ? (?) ? (?) ? (?) | | ? (?) ? (?) |

Waseda University Higashi-Fusimi Ground

== See also ==
- 1949 Emperor's Cup
