= 1928 Emperor's Cup final =

1928 Emperor's Cup Final
Waseda WMW	Kyoto Imperial University
6	1
- Date: October 28, 1928
- Venue: Meiji Jingu Gaien Stadium, Tokyo

1928 Emperor's Cup Final was the eighth final of the Emperor's Cup competition. The final was played at Meiji Jingu Gaien Stadium in Tokyo on October 28, 1928. Kyoto Imperial University won the championship.

== Overview ==
Waseda WMW with Nagayasu Honda and Ko Takamoro on the team, won their 1st title, by defeating Kyoto Imperial University 6–1.

== Match details ==
October 28, 1928

Waseda WMW	6–1	Kyoto Imperial University
? (?) ? (?) ? (?) ? (?) ? (?) ? (?)		? (?)

Meiji Jingu Gaien Stadium

== See also ==
- 1928 Emperor's Cup
