= Kunitaka Sueoka =

Japanese footballer

Kunitaka Sueoka 末岡 圀孝
Personal information
- Full name: Kunitaka Sueoka
- Date of birth: February 1, 1917
- Place of birth: Hiroshima, Empire of Japan
- Date of death: November 10, 1998 (aged 81)
- Position: Defender

Youth career
- Hiroshima Daiichi High School

College career
Years	Team	Apps	(Gls)
- Waseda University

Senior career*
Years	Team	Apps	(Gls)
- Waseda WMW

International career
1940	Japan	1	(0)
Medal record
Waseda University
Winner	Emperor's Cup	1938
- * Club domestic league appearances and goals

Kunitaka Sueoka (末岡 圀孝, Sueoka Kunitaka; February 1, 1917 – November 10, 1998) was a Japanese football player. He played for Japan national team.

== Club career ==
Sueoka was born in Hiroshima Prefecture on February 1, 1917. He played for Waseda University. He won 1938 Emperor's Cup with Sei Fuwa, Sekiji Sasano, Shogo Kamo, Hidetoki Takahashi and so on. He also won the 2nd place at 1939 Emperor's Cup. He also played for Waseda WMW was consisted of his alma mater Waseda University players and graduates. At the club, he won the 2nd place at 1940 Emperor's Cup. This tournament was the last Emperor's Cup before the war because Emperor's Cup was suspended for World War II from 1941 to 1945.

== National team career ==
On June 16, 1940, when Sueoka was a Waseda University student, he debuted for Japan national team against Philippines and Japan won the match. This match was the first match since 1936 Summer Olympics and the only match in the 1940s in Japan's International A Match due to World War II.

Sueoka died in November 1998 at the age of 81.

== National team statistics ==
Japan national team
Year	Apps	Goals
1940	1	0
Total	1	0
