= 1983 Emperor's Cup final =

1983 Emperor's Cup Final
Nissan Motors	Yanmar Diesel
2	0
- Date: January 1, 1984
- Venue: National Stadium, Tokyo

1983 Emperor's Cup Final was the 63rd final of the Emperor's Cup competition. The final was played at National Stadium in Tokyo on January 1, 1984. Nissan Motors won the championship.

== Overview ==
Nissan Motors won their 1st title, by defeating Yanmar Diesel 2–0. Nissan Motors was featured a squad consisting of Makoto Sugiyama, Shinobu Ikeda, Takeshi Koshida, Shinji Tanaka, Hidehiko Shimizu, Kazushi Kimura, Takashi Mizunuma, Koichi Hashiratani and Nobutoshi Kaneda.

== Match details ==
January 1, 1984

Nissan Motors	2–0	Yanmar Diesel
Koichi Hashiratani (?); Nobutoshi Kaneda (?)

National Stadium

== See also ==
- 1983 Emperor's Cup
