= 1964 Emperor's Cup final =

1964 Emperor's Cup Final
Yawata Steel	Furukawa Electric
0	0
- Date: January 17, 1965
- Venue: Kobe Oji Stadium, Hyōgo

1964 Emperor's Cup Final was the 44th final of the Emperor's Cup competition. The final was played at Kobe Oji Stadium in Hyōgo on January 17, 1965. Yawata Steel and Furukawa Electric won the championship.

== Overview ==
Yawata Steel and Furukawa Electric won the championship. Yawata Steel was 1st title, Furukawa Electric was 3rd title.

== Match details ==
January 17, 1965

Yawata Steel	0–0	Furukawa Electric

Kobe Oji Stadium

== See also ==
- 1964 Emperor's Cup
