= 1985 Emperor's Cup final =

1985 Emperor's Cup Final
Nissan Motors	Fujita Industries
2	0
- Date: January 1, 1986
- Venue: National Stadium, Tokyo

1985 Emperor's Cup Final was the 65th final of the Emperor's Cup competition. The final was played at National Stadium in Tokyo on January 1, 1986. Nissan Motors won the championship.

== Overview ==
Nissan Motors won their 2nd title, by defeating Fujita Industries 2–0.

== Match details ==
January 1, 1986

Nissan Motors	2–0	Fujita Industries
Kazushi Kimura (?); Koichi Hashiratani (?)

National Stadium

== See also ==
- 1985 Emperor's Cup
