= 1967 Emperor's Cup final =

1967 Emperor's Cup Final
Toyo Industries	Mitsubishi Motors
1	0
- Date: January 14, 1968
- Venue: National Stadium, Tokyo

1967 Emperor's Cup Final was the 47th final of the Emperor's Cup competition. The final was played at National Stadium in Tokyo on January 14, 1968. Toyo Industries won the cup.

== Overview ==
Toyo Industries won their 2nd title, by defeating Mitsubishi Motors 1–0.

== Match details ==
January 14, 1968

Toyo Industries	1–0	Mitsubishi Motors
? (?)

National Stadium

1967 Emperor's Cup
(Japan)
Toyo Industries
2nd title

== See also ==
- 1967 Emperor's Cup
