= 1984 Emperor's Cup final =

1984 Emperor's Cup Final
| Yomiuri | Furukawa Electric |
| 2 | 0 |
- Date: January 1, 1985
- Venue: National Stadium, Tokyo

1984 Emperor's Cup Final was the 64th final of the Emperor's Cup competition. The final was played at National Stadium in Tokyo on January 1, 1985. Yomiuri won the championship.

== Overview ==
Yomiuri won their 1st title, by defeating Furukawa Electric 2–0. Yomiuri was featured a squad consisting of Yasutaro Matsuki, Hisashi Kato, Satoshi Tsunami, Yukitaka Omi, Ryoichi Kawakatsu, George Yonashiro and Tetsuya Totsuka.

== Match details ==
January 1, 1985

| Yomiuri | 2–0 | Furukawa Electric |
|---|---|---|
| ? (?) ? (?) |

National Stadium

== See also ==
- 1984 Emperor's Cup
