= 1999 Emperor's Cup final =

1999 Emperor's Cup Final
Nagoya Grampus Eight	Sanfrecce Hiroshima
2	0
- Date: January 1, 2000
- Venue: National Stadium, Tokyo

1999 Emperor's Cup Final was the 79th final of the Emperor's Cup competition. The final was played at National Stadium in Tokyo on January 1, 2000. Nagoya Grampus Eight won the championship.

== Overview ==
Nagoya Grampus Eight won their 2nd title, by defeating Sanfrecce Hiroshima – with Wagner Lopes and Stojković goal.

== Match details ==
January 1, 2000

Nagoya Grampus Eight	2–0	Sanfrecce Hiroshima
Wagner Lopes 56'; Stojković 82'

National Stadium
