= 1988 Emperor's Cup final =

1988 Emperor's Cup Final
Nissan Motors	Fujita Industries
3	1
- Date: January 1, 1989
- Venue: National Stadium, Tokyo

1988 Emperor's Cup Final was the 68th final of the Emperor's Cup competition. The final was played at National Stadium in Tokyo on January 1, 1989. Nissan Motors won the championship.

== Overview ==
Nissan Motors won their 3rd title, by defeating Fujita Industries 3–1. Nissan Motors was featured a squad consisting of many international footballers Shigetatsu Matsunaga, Shinji Tanaka, Toru Sano, Hiroshi Hirakawa, Tetsuji Hashiratani, Kazushi Kimura, Koichi Hashiratani and Kenta Hasegawa.

== Match details ==
January 1, 1989

Nissan Motors	3–1	Fujita Industries
? (?) ? (?) ? (?)		? (?)

National Stadium

== See also ==
- 1988 Emperor's Cup
