= 1966 Emperor's Cup final =

1966 Emperor's Cup Final
Waseda University	Toyo Industries
3	2
- Date: January 15, 1967
- Venue: Komazawa Olympic Park Stadium, Tokyo

1966 Emperor's Cup Final was the 46th final of the Emperor's Cup competition. The final was played at Komazawa Olympic Park Stadium in Tokyo on January 15, 1967. Waseda University won the cup.

== Overview ==
Waseda University won the cup, by defeating defending champion Toyo Industries 3–2, at extra time.

This was the last team to win the cup as a university team.

== Match details ==
January 15, 1967

Waseda University	3–2 (a.e.t.)	Toyo Industries
? (?) ? (?) ? (?)		? (?) ? (?)

Komazawa Olympic Park Stadium

1966 Emperor's Cup
(Japan)
Waseda University
4th title

== See also ==
- 1966 Emperor's Cup
