= 1965 Emperor's Cup final =

1965 Emperor's Cup Final
Toyo Industries	Yawata Steel
3	2
- Date: January 16, 1966
- Venue: Komazawa Olympic Park Stadium, Tokyo

1965 Emperor's Cup Final was the 45th final of the Emperor's Cup competition. The final was played at Komazawa Olympic Park Stadium in Tokyo on January 16, 1966. Toyo Industries won the championship.

== Overview ==
Toyo Industries won their 1st title, by defeating defending champion Yawata Steel 3–2.

== Match details ==
January 16, 1966

Toyo Industries	3–2	Yawata Steel
? (?) ? (?) ? (?)		? (?) ? (?)

Komazawa Olympic Park Stadium

1965 Emperor's Cup
(Japan)
Toyo Industries
First title

== See also ==
- 1965 Emperor's Cup
