= 1981 Emperor's Cup final =

1981 Emperor's Cup Final
Nippon Kokan	Yomiuri
2	0
- Date: January 1, 1982
- Venue: National Stadium, Tokyo

1981 Emperor's Cup Final was the 61st final of the Emperor's Cup competition. The final was played at National Stadium in Tokyo on January 1, 1982. Nippon Kokan won the championship.

== Overview ==
Nippon Kokan won their 1st title, by defeating Yomiuri 2–0. Nippon Kokan was featured a squad consisting of Koji Tanaka, Nobuo Fujishima and Toshio Matsuura.

== Match details ==
January 1, 1982

Nippon Kokan	2–0	Yomiuri
Toshio Matsuura (?)

National Stadium

== See also ==
- 1981 Emperor's Cup
