= 1987 Emperor's Cup final =

1987 Emperor's Cup Final
Yomiuri	Mazda
2	0
- Date: January 1, 1988
- Venue: National Stadium, Tokyo

1987 Emperor's Cup Final was the 67th final of the Emperor's Cup competition. The final was played at National Stadium in Tokyo on January 1, 1988. Yomiuri won the championship.

== Overview ==
Defending champion Yomiuri won their 3rd title, by defeating Mazda 2–0. Yomiuri was featured a squad consisting of Yasutaro Matsuki, Hisashi Kato, Satoshi Tsunami, Ruy Ramos and Tetsuya Totsuka.

== Match details ==
January 1, 1988

Yomiuri	2–0	Mazda
? (?); Tetsuya Totsuka (?)

National Stadium

== See also ==
- 1987 Emperor's Cup
