= 1969 Emperor's Cup final =

1969 Emperor's Cup Final
Toyo Industries	Rikkyo University
4	1
- Date: January 1, 1970
- Venue: National Stadium, Tokyo

1969 Emperor's Cup Final was the 49th final of the Emperor's Cup competition. The final was played at National Stadium in Tokyo on January 1, 1970. Toyo Industries won the championship.

== Overview ==
Toyo Industries won their 3rd title, by defeating Rikkyo University 4–1.

== Match details ==
January 1, 1970

Toyo Industries	4–1	Rikkyo University
? (?) ? (?) ? (?) ? (?)		? (?)

National Stadium

1969 Emperor's Cup
(Japan)
Toyo Industries
3 title

== See also ==
- 1969 Emperor's Cup
