= Sachi Kagawa =

Japanese footballer

Sachi Kagawa 香川 幸
Personal information
- Full name: Sachi Kagawa
- Place of birth: Hiroshima, Empire of Japan
- Position: Forward

Youth career
- ????: Hiroshima Daiichi High School
- ????: Dairoku High School
- 1925–????: Kyoto Imperial University

Senior career*
Years	Team	Apps	(Gls)
- Rijo Shukyu-Dan

International career
1925	Japan	2	(0)
Medal record
Rijo Shukyu-Dan
Winner	Emperor's Cup	1924
Winner	Emperor's Cup	1925
- * Club domestic league appearances and goals

Sachi Kagawa (香川 幸, Kagawa Sachi) was a Japanese football player. He played for Japan national team.

== Club career ==
Kagawa was born in Hiroshima Prefecture. He played for his local club Rijo Shukyu-Dan. He won 1924 and 1925 Emperor's Cup with international players Naoemon Shimizu and Shizuo Miyama.

== National team career ==
In May 1925, Kagawa was selected Japan national team for 1925 Far Eastern Championship Games in Manila. At this competition, on May 17, he debuted against Philippines. On May 20, he also played against Republic of China. But Japan lost in both matches (0-4, v Philippines and 0-2, v Republic of China). He played 2 games for Japan in 1925.

== National team statistics ==
Japan national team
Year	Apps	Goals
1925	2	0
Total	2	0
