= 2011 Emperor's Cup final =

2011 Emperor's Cup
Kyoto Sanga FC	FC Tokyo
2	4
- Date: 1 January 2012
- Venue: National Olympic Stadium, Shinjuku, Tokyo
- Referee: Yuichi Nishimura

The Final of the 2011 Emperor's Cup was held at National Olympic Stadium in Shinjuku, Tokyo on 1 January 2012. The match was contested between two second division sides, Kyoto Sanga FC who were defeated by FC Tokyo in regulation time.

== Route to the final ==
=== Kyoto Sanga FC ===
Round	Opposition	Score
2nd	Sagawa Printing (h)	3–0
3rd	Montedio Yamagata (a)	2–3
4th	Kashima Antlers (a)	0–1
Quarter-final	Shonan Bellmare (h)	1–0
Semi-final	Yokohama F. Marinos (n)	2–4 (a.e.t.)

=== FC Tokyo ===
Round	Opposition	Score
2nd	F.C. Kagoshima (h)	4–0
3rd	Vissel Kobe (h)	2–1 (a.e.t.)
4th	Mito HollyHock (a)	0–1
Quarter-final	Urawa Red Diamonds (h)	1–0
Semi-final	Cerezo Osaka (n)	1–0

== Match ==
2012-01-01
14:00

Kyoto Sanga	2–4	FC Tokyo
Nakayama 13'; Kubo 71'	Report	Konno 15'; Morishige 36'; Lucas 42', 66'

National Olympic Stadium, Shinjuku
Attendance: 41,974
Referee: Yuichi Nishimura

== See also ==
- 2011 Emperor's Cup
