= Shiro Teshima =

Japanese footballer

Shiro Teshima 手島 志郎
Personal information
- Full name: Shiro Teshima
- Date of birth: February 26, 1907
- Place of birth: Hiroshima, Empire of Japan
- Date of death: November 6, 1982 (aged 75)
- Place of death: Japan
- Height: 1.52 m (5 ft 0 in)
- Position: Forward

Youth career
- Hiroshima High School
- 1929–1932: Tokyo Imperial University

Senior career*
Years	Team	Apps	(Gls)
- Tokyo OB Club

International career
1930	Japan	2	(2)
Medal record
Tokyo OB Club
Winner	Emperor's Cup	1933
- * Club domestic league appearances and goals

Shiro Teshima (手島 志郎, Teshima Shiro; February 26, 1907 – November 6, 1982) was a Japanese football player. He played for Japan national team.

== Club career ==
Teshima was born in Hiroshima Prefecture on February 26, 1907. He played for Tokyo OB Club and won 1933 Emperor's Cup with Shigemaru Takenokoshi and Teiichi Matsumaru.

== National team career ==
In May 1930, when Teshima was a Tokyo Imperial University student, he was selected Japan national team for 1930 Far Eastern Championship Games in Tokyo and Japan won the championship. At this competition, on May 25, he debuted and scored a goal against Philippines. On May 29, he also played and scored a goal against Republic of China. He played 2 games and scored 2 goals for Japan in 1930.

== After retirement ==
After graduating from Tokyo Imperial University, Teshima retired playing career and joined Ministry of Agriculture and Forestry. In 1940, he joined Tanabe Pharmaceutical and helps develop the club.

Teshima died on November 6, 1982, at the age of 75. In 2008, he was selected Japan Football Hall of Fame.

== National team statistics ==
Japan national team
Year	Apps	Goals
1930	2	2
Total	2	2

== Honours ==
- Japan Football Hall of Fame: Inducted in 2008
