= Takeo Wakabayashi =

Japanese footballer

Takeo Wakabayashi 若林 竹雄
Personal information
- Full name: Takeo Wakabayashi
- Date of birth: 29 August 1907
- Place of birth: Hyogo, Empire of Japan
- Date of death: 7 August 1937 (aged 29)
- Place of death: Hyogo, Empire of Japan
- Position: Forward

Youth career
- Kobe Daiichi High School
- Tokyo Imperial University

Senior career*
Years	Team	Apps	(Gls)
- Kobe Icchu Club

International career
1930	Japan	2	(4)
Medal record
Kobe Icchu Club
Winner	Emperor's Cup	1927
- * Club domestic league appearances and goals

Takeo Wakabayashi (若林 竹雄, Wakabayashi Takeo; 29 August 1907 – 7 August 1937) was a Japanese football player. He played for Japan national team.

== Club career ==
Wakabayashi was born in Hyogo Prefecture on 29 August 1907. He played for his local club Kobe Icchu Club was consisted of his alma mater high school players and graduates. At the club, he won 1927 Emperor's Cup with Tadao Takayama and so on.

== National team career ==
In May 1930, when Wakabayashi was a Tokyo Imperial University student, he was selected Japan national team for 1930 Far Eastern Championship Games in Tokyo and Japan also won the championship. At this competition, on 25 May, he debuted and scored 4 goals against Philippines. He was the first player in Japan national team to score a hat-trick in debut. The same feat would be achieved 80 years later by Sota Hirayama. On 29 May, he also played against Republic of China. He played 2 games and scored 4 goals for Japan in 1930.

On 7 August 1937, Wakabayashi died of lung disease in Hyogo Prefecture at the age of 29.

== National team statistics ==
Japan national team
Year	Apps	Goals
1930	2	4
Total	2	4
