= 1968 Emperor's Cup final =

1968 Emperor's Cup Final
Yanmar Diesel	Mitsubishi Motors
1	0
- Date: January 1, 1969
- Venue: National Stadium, Tokyo

1968 Emperor's Cup Final was the 48th final of the Emperor's Cup competition. The final was played at National Stadium in Tokyo on January 1, 1969. Yanmar Diesel won the cup.

== Overview ==
Yanmar Diesel won their 1st title, by defeating Mitsubishi Motors 1–0.

== Match details ==
January 1, 1969

Yanmar Diesel	1–0	Mitsubishi Motors
? (?)

National Stadium

1968 Emperor's Cup
(Japan)
Yanmar Diesel
1st title

== See also ==
- 1968 Emperor's Cup
