= 1980 Emperor's Cup final =

1980 Emperor's Cup Final
Mitsubishi Motors	Tanabe Pharmaceutical
1	0
- Date: January 1, 1981
- Venue: National Stadium, Tokyo

1980 Emperor's Cup Final was the 60th final of the Emperor's Cup competition. The final was played at National Stadium in Tokyo on January 1, 1981. Mitsubishi Motors won the championship.

== Overview ==
Mitsubishi Motors of the First Division won their 4th title, by defeating Tanabe Pharmaceutical of the Second Division by 1–0. Mitsubishi Motors was featured a squad consisting of Mitsuhisa Taguchi, Hiroshi Ochiai, Mitsunori Fujiguchi, Atsushi Natori, Kazuo Ozaki and Ikuo Takahara.

This was also the first Emperor's Cup final to feature a club from the second tier of Japanese football.

== Match details ==
January 1, 1981

Mitsubishi Motors	1–0	Tanabe Pharmaceutical
? (?)

National Stadium

== See also ==
- 1980 Emperor's Cup
