= Hideo Sakai =

Japanese footballer

Hideo Sakai 堺井 秀雄
Personal information
- Full name: Hideo Sakai
- Date of birth: June 10, 1909
- Place of birth: Osaka, Empire of Japan
- Date of death: June 3, 1996 (aged 86)
- Place of death: Nishinomiya, Hyogo, Japan
- Position: Forward

Youth career
- ????–1931: Kwansei Gakuin University

Senior career*
Years	Team	Apps	(Gls)
- Kwangaku Club

International career
1934	Japan	3	(0)
Medal record
Kwangaku Club
Winner	Emperor's Cup	1929
Winner	Emperor's Cup	1930
- * Club domestic league appearances and goals

Hideo Sakai (堺井 秀雄, Sakai Hideo; June 10, 1909 – June 3, 1996) was a Japanese football player. He played for Japan national team.

== Club career ==
Sakai was born in Osaka Prefecture on June 10, 1909. He played for Kwangaku Club was consisted of his alma mater Kwansei Gakuin University players and graduates. He won 1929 and 1930 Emperor's Cup with Yukio Goto and so on at the club.

== National team career ==
In May 1934, Sakai was selected Japan national team for 1934 Far Eastern Championship Games in Manila. At this competition, on May 13, he debuted against Dutch East Indies. He also played against Philippines and Republic of China. He played 3 games for Japan in 1934.

On June 3, 1996, Sakai died of a pneumonia in Nishinomiya at the age of 86.

== National team statistics ==
Japan national team
Year	Apps	Goals
1934	3	0
Total	3	0
