= 1991 Emperor's Cup final =

1991 Emperor's Cup Final
Nissan Motors	Yomiuri
4	1
- Date: January 1, 1992
- Venue: National Stadium, Tokyo

1991 Emperor's Cup Final was the 71st final of the Emperor's Cup competition. The final was played at National Stadium in Tokyo on January 1, 1992. Nissan Motors won the championship.

== Overview ==
Nissan Motors won their 5th title, by defeating Yomiuri 4–1. Nissan Motors was featured a squad consisting of Shigetatsu Matsunaga, Masami Ihara, Tetsuji Hashiratani, Kazushi Kimura and Renato.

== Match details ==
January 1, 1992

Nissan Motors	4–1	Yomiuri
Everton (?); Kazushi Kimura (?); Takahiro Yamada (?); Renato (?)		Nobuhiro Takeda (?)

National Stadium

== See also ==
- 1991 Emperor's Cup
