= 1977 Emperor's Cup final =

1977 Emperor's Cup Final
Fujita Industries	Yanmar Diesel
4	1
- Date: January 1, 1978
- Venue: National Stadium, Tokyo

1977 Emperor's Cup Final was the 57th final of the Emperor's Cup competition. The final was played at National Stadium in Tokyo on January 1, 1978. Fujita Industries won the championship.

== Overview ==
Fujita Industries won their 1st title, by defeating Yanmar Diesel 4–1.

== Match details ==
January 1, 1978

Fujita Industries	4–1	Yanmar Diesel
? (?) ? (?) ? (?) ? (?)		? (?)

National Stadium

Fujita Industries
GK	(Japan) Kazuya Sasaki
DF	(Japan) Sonobe
DF	(Japan) Yuji Waki
DF	(Japan) Keizo Imai
DF	(Japan) Hara
MF	(Japan) Mitsuo Watanabe
MF	(Japan) Mitsuru Komaeda
MF	(Brazil) Marinho
MF	(Brazil) Luiz Seihan Higa	Substituted off
FW	(Japan) Carvalho
FW	(Japan) Yuichi Kotaki	Substituted off
Substitutes:
FW	(Japan) Shigeharu Ueki	Substituted on
Manager:
(Japan) Yoshinobu Ishii

Yanmar Diesel
GK	1	(Japan) Nobuhiro Nishikata
DF	13	(Japan) Hiroshi Sakano
DF	'14	(Japan) Nobuyuki Uenoyama
DF	4	(Japan) Yushi Matsumura
DF	12	(Japan) Yoshimi Fujiwara
MF	8	(Japan) Daishiro Yoshimura
DF	'2	(Japan) Toshio Mizuguchi
MF	10	(Japan) Hiroo Abe
MF	7	(Japan) Hiroji Imamura	Substituted off
FW	9	(Japan) Kunishige Kamamoto
FW	20	(Japan) Kazuo Uenishi
Substitutes:
FW	11	(Japan) Yoshiharu Horii	Substituted on
Manager:
(Japan) Kenji Onitake

== See also ==
- 1977 Emperor's Cup
