= 1986 Emperor's Cup final =

1986 Emperor's Cup Final
| Yomiuri | Nippon Kokan |
| 2 | 1 |
- Date: January 1, 1987
- Venue: National Stadium, Tokyo

1986 Emperor's Cup Final was the 66th final of the Emperor's Cup competition. The final was played at National Stadium in Tokyo on January 1, 1987. Yomiuri won the championship.

== Overview ==
Yomiuri won their 2nd title, by defeating Nippon Kokan 2–0. Yomiuri was featured a squad consisting of Yasutaro Matsuki, Hisashi Kato, Ruy Ramos, Tetsuya Totsuka and Nobuhiro Takeda.

== Match details ==
January 1, 1987

| Yomiuri | 2–1 | Nippon Kokan |
|---|---|---|
| ? (?) ? (?) | | ? (?) |

National Stadium

== See also ==
- 1986 Emperor's Cup
