= 1931 Emperor's Cup =

Japanese football tournament

Tournament details
- Country: Japan
- Teams: 7

Final positions
- Champions: Imperial University of Tokyo LB
- Runners-up: Kobun Junior High School
- Semifinalists: II School Club; Nagoya Shukyu-dan

Tournament statistics
- Matches played: 6
- Goals scored: 23 (3.83 per match)

The 1931 Emperor's Cup was the 10th edition of the Emperor's Cup competition.

== Overview ==
It was contested by 7 teams, and Imperial University of Tokyo LB won the cup.

== Results ==
=== Quarterfinals ===
- Kwansei Gakuin University 1–2 Imperial University of Tokyo LB
- Hakodate Shukyu-dan 0–2 Nagoya Shukyu-dan
- Toyama Shihan Club 1–5 Kobun Junior High School

=== Semifinals ===
- II School Club 0–2 Imperial University of Tokyo LB
- Nagoya Shukyu-dan 1–3 Kobun Junior High School

=== Final ===
- Imperial University of Tokyo LB 5–1 Kobun Junior High School

Imperial University of Tokyo LB won the cup.
