= Tadao Kobayashi =

Japanese footballer

Tadao Kobayashi 小林 忠生
Personal information
- Full name: Tadao Kobayashi
- Date of birth: 7 July 1930
- Place of birth: Kanagawa, Empire of Japan
- Height: 1.73 m (5 ft 8 in)
- Position: Forward

Youth career
- Shonan High School
- 1950–1953: Keio University

Senior career*
Years	Team	Apps	(Gls)
- Keio BRB

International career
1956	Japan	3	(0)
Medal record
Keio BRB
Winner	Emperor's Cup	1954
Winner	Emperor's Cup	1956
- * Club domestic league appearances and goals

Tadao Kobayashi (小林 忠生, Kobayashi Tadao; born 7 July 1930) is a Japanese former football player. He played for Japan national team.

== Club career ==
Kobayashi was born in Kanagawa Prefecture on 7 July 1930. After graduating from Keio University, he played for Keio BRB, which consisted of players from his alma mater. He won the 1954 and 1956 Emperor's Cups with the club.

== National team career ==
In June 1956, Kobayashi was selected by the Japan national team for the 1956 Summer Olympics qualification. He debuted at this qualification on 3 June against South Korea. In November, he played at the 1956 Summer Olympics in Melbourne. He played three games for Japan in 1956.

== National team statistics ==
Japan national team
Year	Apps	Goals
1956	3	0
Total	3	0
