= 1927 Emperor's Cup =

Japanese football tournament

Tournament details
- Country: Japan
- Teams: 8

Final positions
- Champions: Kobe Icchu Club (1st title)
- Runners-up: Rijo Club
- Semifinalists: Kansai University; Waseda Gakuin

Tournament statistics
- Matches played: 7
- Goals scored: 15 (2.14 per match)

The 1927 Emperor's Cup was the 6th edition of the Emperor's Cup competition.

== Overview ==
It was contested by 8 teams, and Kobe Icchu Club won the cup.

== Results ==
=== Quarterfinals ===
- Kansai University 1–1 (lottery) Hokkaido University
- Rijo Club 2–1 Hosei University
- Kobe Icchu Club 2–0 Yoshino Club
- Waseda Gakuin 1–0 Sendai Club

=== Semifinals ===
- Kansai University 0–4 Rijo Club
- Kobe Icchu Club 1–0 Waseda Gakuin

=== Final ===
- Rijo Club 0–2 Kobe Icchu Club

Kobe Icchu Club won the cup.
