= 1970 Emperor's Cup =

Japanese football tournament

Tournament details
- Country: Japan

Final positions
- Champions: Yanmar Diesel (2nd title)
- Runners-up: Toyo Industries
- Semifinalists: Hitachi; Mitsubishi Motors

Statistics of Emperor's Cup in the 1970 season.

== Overview ==
It was contested by 8 teams, and Yanmar Diesel won the championship.

== Results ==
=== Quarterfinals ===
- Toyo Industries 4–0 Fukuoka University
- Hitachi 5–1 Osaka University of Commerce
- Mitsubishi Motors 4–0 Osaka University of Economics
- Yanmar Diesel 4–2 Hosei University

=== Semifinals ===
- Toyo Industries 2–1 Hitachi
- Mitsubishi Motors 2–2 (lottery) Yanmar Diesel

=== Final ===
- Toyo Industries 1–2 Yanmar Diesel

Yanmar Diesel won the championship.

1970 Emperor's Cup
(Japan)
Yanmar Diesel
2 title
