= Ōmiya Velodrome =

Velodrome in Ōmiya-ku, Saitama, Japan

Coordinates: 35.9191752°N 139.6337575°E

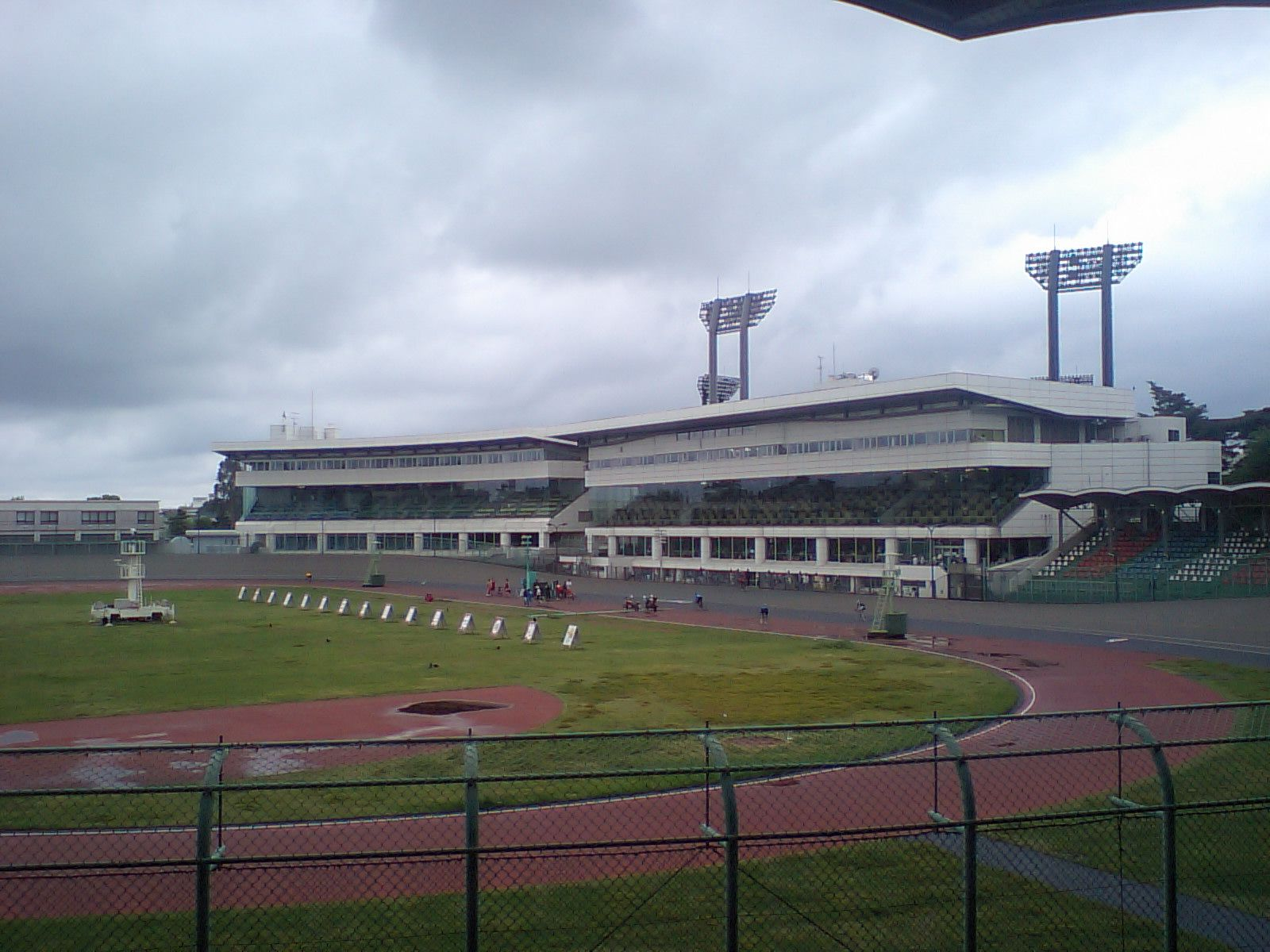
Ōmiya Velodrome Grandstand.

Ōmiya Velodrome (大宮競輪場, Ōmiya Keirinjyō) is a velodrome located in Ōmiya-ku, Saitama that conducts pari-mutuel Keirin racing - one of Japan's four authorized "Public Sports" (公営競技, kōei kyōgi) where gambling is permitted. Its Keirin identification number for betting purposes is 25# (25 sharp).

Ōmiya's oval is 500 meters in circumference. A typical keirin race of 2,025 meters consists of four laps around the course.

Inside the keirin oval is a 400-meter running track used for track and field athletics events which hosted the 1962 National Athletics Championships.

== See also ==
- List of cycling tracks and velodromes
