= 1936 Emperor's Cup =

Tournament details
- Country: Japan

Final positions
- Champions: Keio BRB
- Runners-up: Bosung College
- Semifinalists: Kwansei Gakuin University; Nagoya Pharmaceutical College

Statistics of Emperor's Cup in the 1936 season.

== Overview ==
It was contested by 5 teams, and Keio BRB won the championship.They won their 2nd title

== Results ==
=== Quarterfinals ===
- Bosung College 10–1 Tohoku Gakuin University

=== Semifinals ===
- Bosung College 4–2 Kwansei Gakuin University
- Keio BRB 13–0 Nagoya Pharmaceutical College

=== Final ===
- Bosung College 2–3 Keio BRB

Keio BRB won the championship.
