= Yukio Goto =

Japanese footballer

Yukio Goto 後藤 靱雄

Personal information
- Full name: Yukio Goto
- Place of birth: Kobe, Hyogo, Japan
- Date of death: 1976
- Place of death: Japan
- Position: Defender

Youth career
- Kwansei Gakuin High School
- Kwansei Gakuin University

Senior career*
Years	Team	Apps	(Gls)
- Kwangaku Club

International career
1930–1934	Japan	4	(0)
Medal record
Kwangaku Club
Winner	Emperor's Cup	1929
Winner	Emperor's Cup	1930
- * Club domestic league appearances and goals

Yukio Goto (後藤 靱雄, Goto Yukio; ? – 1976) was a Japanese football player. He played for Japan national team.

== Club career ==
Goto was born in Kobe, Japan, to a Belgian father. He played for Kwangaku Club was consisted of his alma mater Kwansei Gakuin University players and graduates. He won 1929 and 1930 Emperor's Cup at the club.

== National team career ==
In May 1930, when Goto was a Kwansei Gakuin University student, he was selected Japan national team for 1930 Far Eastern Championship Games in Tokyo and Japan won the championship. At this competition, on May 25, he debuted against Philippines. In 1934, he was also selected Japan for 1934 Far Eastern Championship Games in Manila. At this competition, he played 2 games as Japan team captain. He played 4 games for Japan until 1934.

Goto died in 1976.

== National team statistics ==
Japan national team
Year	Apps	Goals
1930	2	0
1931	0	0
1932	0	0
1933	0	0
1934	2	0
Total	4	0
