= 1959 Emperor's Cup =

Tournament details
- Country: Japan

Final positions
- Champions: Kwangaku Club
- Runners-up: Chuo University
- Semifinalists: Nagoya Club; Toyo Industries

Statistics of Emperor's Cup in the 1959 season.

== Overview ==
It was contested by 16 teams, and Kwangaku Club won the championship.

== Results ==
=== 1st Round ===
- All Rikkyo 1–0 Kwangaku Club
- Yawata Steel 0–1 Nagoya Club
- Toyama Soccer 0–13 Chuo University
- Meiyu Club 3–2 Kyoto Shiko
- All Tohoku Gakuin University 0–6 Furukawa Electric
- Zen Hokkai Club 0–10 Kwangaku Club
- All Osaka University of Economics 0–2 Toyo Industries
- All Matsuyama Commercial High School 0–9 Keio BRB

=== Quarterfinals ===
- All Rikkyo 3–4 Nagoya Club
- Chuo University 4–1 Meiyu Club
- Furukawa Electric 1–2 Kwangaku Club
- Toyo Industries 1–0 Keio BRB

=== Semifinals ===
- Nagoya Club 0–3 Chuo University
- Kwangaku Club 2–0 Toyo Industries

=== Final ===
- Chuo University 0–1 Kwangaku Club

Kwangaku Club won the championship.
