= 1932 Emperor's Cup =

Japanese football tournament

Tournament details
- Country: Japan
- Teams: 3

Final positions
- Champions: Keio Club
- Runners-up: Yoshino Club
- Semifinalists: Sakai Secondary School Club

The 1932 Emperor's Cup was the 11th edition of the Emperor's Cup competition.

== Overview ==
It was contested by 3 teams, and Keio Club won the cup.

== Results ==
=== Semi-finals ===
- Keio Club 3–0 Sakai Secondary School Club

=== Final ===
- Keio Club 5–1 Yoshino Club

Keio Club won the cup.
