= Koshien South Ground =

Athletic stadium in Hyogo, Japan

- Location: Nishinomiya, Hyogo, Japan

Koshien South Ground (甲子園南運動場) was an athletic stadium in Nishinomiya, Hyogo, Japan.

Japan national football team used this stadium in 1940.
