= 1971 Emperor's Cup =

Japanese football tournament

Tournament details
- Country: Japan

Final positions
- Champions: Mitsubishi Motors
- Runners-up: Yanmar Diesel
- Semifinalists: Nippon Steel; Hitachi

Statistics of Emperor's Cup in the 1971 season.

== Overview ==
It was contested by 8 teams, and Mitsubishi Motors won the championship.

== Results ==
=== Quarterfinals ===
- Yanmar Diesel 3–1 Waseda University
- Nippon Steel 6–1 Chuo University
- Hitachi 2–1 Tokyo University of Education
- Mitsubishi Motors 4–1 Keio University

=== Semifinals ===
- Yanmar Diesel 7–1 Nippon Steel
- Hitachi 1–2 Mitsubishi Motors

=== Final ===
- Yanmar Diesel 1–3 Mitsubishi Motors

Mitsubishi Motors won the championship.
