= 1937 Emperor's Cup =

Tournament details
- Country: Japan

Final positions
- Champions: Keio University
- Runners-up: Kobe University of Commerce
- Semifinalists: Poseung College; Osaka Club

Statistics of Emperor's Cup in the 1937 season.

== Overview ==
It was contested by 4 teams, and Keio University won the championship. Their third one. Kumamoto Club withdrew before the start of the tournament.

== Results ==
=== Semifinals ===
- Kobe University of Commerce 2–1 Poseung College
- Keio University 6–1 Osaka Club

=== Final ===
- Kobe University of Commerce 0–3 Keio University

Keio University won the championship.
