= Hidetoki Takahashi =

Japanese footballer and manager

Hidetoki Takahashi 高橋 英辰
Personal information
- Full name: Hidetoki Takahashi
- Date of birth: April 11, 1916
- Place of birth: Fukushima, Fukushima, Empire of Japan
- Date of death: February 5, 2000 (aged 83)
- Place of death: Meguro, Tokyo, Japan
- Position: Forward

Youth career
- 1934–1936: Kariya High School

College career
Years	Team	Apps	(Gls)
1937–1940	Waseda University		

Senior career*
Years	Team	Apps	(Gls)
1941–1958	Hitachi		

Managerial career
- 1955–1956: Waseda University
- 1957: Japan
- 1959: Japan U-20
- 1960–1962: Japan
- 1970–1976: Hitachi
Medal record
Waseda University
Winner	Emperor's Cup	1938
- * Club domestic league appearances and goals

Hidetoki Takahashi (高橋 英辰, Takahashi Hidetoki; April 11, 1916 – February 5, 2000) was a Japanese football player and manager. He managed Japan national team.

== Playing career ==
Takahashi was born in Fukushima on April 11, 1916. He played for Waseda University. He won 1938 Emperor's Cup with Sei Fuwa, Sekiji Sasano, Kunitaka Sueoka, Shogo Kamo and so on. After graduation from university, he played for Hitachi from 1941 to 1958.

== Coaching career ==
From 1955, Takahashi also started his career as a manager. In 1957, he became manager for Japan national team as Shigemaru Takenokoshi's successor for the tour of China. In 1959, he became manager for Japan U-20 national team for 1959 AFC Youth Championship and won 3rd place. In 1960, he managed the Japan national team as Takenokoshi successor again. He managed the team for the 1962 World Cup qualification and 1962 Asian Games. After that, he managed for Hitachi.

On February 5, 2000, Takahashi died of pneumonia in Meguro, Tokyo at the age of 83. In 2009, he was inducted in Japan Football Hall of Fame.

== Honours ==
- Japan Football Hall of Fame: Inducted in 2009
