= 1953 Emperor's Cup =

Tournament details
- Country: Japan

Final positions
- Champions: All Kwangaku
- Runners-up: Osaka Club
- Semifinalists: Toyo Industries; All Keio

Statistics of Emperor's Cup in the 1953 season.

== Overview ==
It was contested by 16 teams. All Kwangaku won the final and the championship.

== Results ==
=== 1st Round ===
- Toyama Club 0–2 Osaka Club
- All Rikkyo 4–1 Tohoku Gakuin University
- Chuo University 8–0 Kagoshima Soccer
- Toyo Industries 4–0 All Doshisha University
- Muroran Club (retired) – All Kwangaku
- Tokyo University of Education 3–1 All Yamanashi
- Matsuyama MUC 2–6 Rokko Club
- All Keio 9–0 Kariya Club

=== Quarterfinals ===
- Osaka Club 3–1 All Rikkyo
- Chuo University 1–2 Toyo Industries
- All Kwangaku 2–1 Tokyo University of Education
- Rokko Club 1–3 All Keio

=== Semifinals ===
- Osaka Club 3–1 Toyo Industries
- All Kwangaku 2–1 All Keio

=== Final ===
- Osaka Club 4–5 All Kwangaku

All Kwangaku won the championship.
