= 1930 Emperor's Cup =

Japanese football tournament

Tournament details
- Country: Japan
- Teams: 4

Final positions
- Champions: Kwangaku Club (2nd title)
- Runners-up: Keio BRB
- Semifinalists: Nagoya Shukyu-dan; Ryoyo Club

Tournament statistics
- Matches played: 3
- Goals scored: 25 (8.33 per match)

The 1930 Emperor's Cup was the 9th edition of the Emperor's Cup competition.

== Overview ==
It was contested by 4 teams, and Kwangaku Club won the cup.

== Results ==
=== Semi-finals ===
- Keio BRB 6–3 Nagoya Shukyu-dan
- Kwangaku Club 8–5 Ryoyo Club

=== Final ===
- Keio BRB 0–3 Kwangaku Club

Kwangaku Club won the cup.
