= 1956 Emperor's Cup =

Tournament details
- Country: Japan

Final positions
- Champions: Keio BRB
- Runners-up: Yawata Steel
- Semifinalists: Toyo Industries; Chuo University Club

Statistics of Emperor's Cup in the 1956 season.

== Overview ==
It was contested by 16 teams, and Keio BRB won the championship.

== Results ==
=== 1st Round ===
- Kwangaku Club 8–0 Tomioka Soccer
- Hamamatsu Soccer 0–4 Keio BRB
- All Muroran 0–7 Toyo Industries
- All Rikkyo 2–1 Tohoku Gakuin University
- Urawa Club 1–1 (lottery) All Kansai University
- Chuo University Club 2–1 Kyoto Shiko
- Osaka Club 5–1 Ueda Club
- University of Tokyo LB 1–6 Yawata Steel

=== Quarterfinals ===
- Kwangaku Club 1–2 Keio BRB
- Toyo Industries 1–0 All Rikkyo
- All Kansai University 1–3 Chuo University Club
- Osaka Club 1–1 (lottery) Yawata Steel

=== Semifinals ===
- Keio BRB 3–0 Toyo Industries
- Chuo University Club 2–2 (lottery) Yawata Steel

=== Final ===
- Keio BRB 4–2 Yawata Steel

Keio BRB won the championship.
