= 1940 Emperor's Cup =

Tournament details
- Country: Japan

Final positions
- Champions: Keio BRB
- Runners-up: Waseda University
- Semifinalists: Imperial University of Kyoto; Bosung College

Statistics of Emperor's Cup in the 1940 season.

== Overview ==
It was contested by 8 teams, and Keio BRB won the championship.

== Results ==
=== Quarterfinals ===
- Kansai University 1–2 Imperial University of Kyoto
- Yonhi College 1–2 Waseda University WMW
- Kwansei Gakuin University 1–1 (lottery) Bosung College
- Imperial University of Tohoku 0–3 Keio BRB

=== Semifinals ===
- Imperial University of Kyoto 1–2 Waseda University WMW
- Bosung College 1–2 Keio BRB

=== Final ===
- Waseda University WMW 0–1 Keio BRB

Keio BRB won the championship.
