= 1933 Emperor's Cup =

Japanese football tournament

Tournament details
- Country: Japan
- Teams: 8

Final positions
- Champions: Tokyo OB Club
- Runners-up: Sendai S.C.
- Semifinalists: Kwansei Gakuin University; Hiroshima Teachers

Tournament statistics
- Matches played: 7
- Goals scored: 30 (4.29 per match)

Statistics of Emperor's Cup in the 1933 season.

== Overview ==
It was contested by 8 teams, and Tokyo OB Club won the cup.

== Results ==
=== Quarter-finals ===
- Kwansei Gakuin University 6–1 Toyama Shihan
- Tokyo OB Club 2–0 Hakodate Shukyu-dan
- Sendai S.C. 2–1 Shizuoka High School Club
- Hiroshima Teachers 4–2 Kumamoto Shihan Shukyu-dan

=== Semi-finals ===
- Kwansei Gakuin University 0–2 Tokyo OB Club
- Sendai S.C. 5–0 Hiroshima Teachers

=== Final ===
- Tokyo OB Club 4–1 Sendai S.C.

Tokyo OB Club won the cup.
