= 1929 Emperor's Cup =

Japanese football tournament

Tournament details
- Country: Japan
- Teams: 8

Final positions
- Champions: Kwangaku Club (1st title)
- Runners-up: Hosei University
- Semifinalists: Ho-sho Club; Keio University

Tournament statistics
- Matches played: 7
- Goals scored: 27 (3.86 per match)

The 1929 Emperor's Cup was the 8th edition of the Emperor's Cup competition.

== Overview ==
It was contested by 8 teams, and Kwangaku Club won the cup.

== Results ==
=== Quarter-finals ===
- Ho-sho Club – (retired) Hiroshima Bunri University
- Kwangaku Club 6–1 Toyama Teachers College
- Keio University 2–0 Imperial University of Kyoto
- Hosei University 3–3 (lottery) Shizuoka High School

=== Semi-finals ===
- Ho-sho Club 0–5 Kwangaku Club
- Keio University 2–2 (lottery) Hosei University

=== Final ===
- Kwangaku Club 3–0 Hosei University

Kwangaku Club won the cup.
