= 1939 Emperor's Cup =

Tournament details
- Country: Japan

Final positions
- Champions: Keio BRB
- Runners-up: Waseda University
- Semifinalists: Bosung College; Imperial University of Kyoto

Statistics of Emperor's Cup in the 1939 season.

== Overview ==
It was contested by 8 teams, and Keio BRB won the championship. That was their 4th title

== Results ==
=== Quarterfinals ===
- Waseda University 6–0 Kobe Commercial University
- Bosung College 4–0 Kwansei Gakuin University
- Yonhi College 0–4 Keio BRB
- Osaka Club 0–8 Imperial University of Kyoto

=== Semifinals ===
- Waseda University 2–2 (lottery) Bosung College
- Keio BRB 4–1 Imperial University of Kyoto

=== Final ===
- Waseda University 2–3 Keio BRB

Keio BRB won the championship.
