= Japan national football team results (1940–1949) =

This article lists the results for the Japan national football team between 1940 and 1949.

Because the opponents were considered to be puppet states and not internationally recognized, the matches except for the Philippines match, were not recorded by FIFA.

After World War II, the Japan national football team were banned from attending any international football games from 1945 to 1951.

== 1940 ==
| Date | Opponent | Result | Score | Venue | Competition | Refs |
|---|---|---|---|---|---|---|
| 7 June 1940 | Manchukuo | W | 7–0 | Meiji Jingu Gaien Stadium, Tokyo, Japan | International Friendly | |
| 9 June 1940 | Reorganized National Government of China | W | 6–0 | Meiji Jingu Gaien Stadium, Tokyo, Japan | International Friendly | |
| 16 June 1940 | Philippines | W | 1–0 | South Koshien Stadium, Nishinomiya, Japan | International Friendly | |

== 1942 ==
| Date | Opponent | Result | Score | Venue | Competition |
|---|---|---|---|---|---|
| 8 August 1942 | Reorganized National Government of China | W | 6–1 | Xinjing, Manchukuo | International Friendly |
| 9 August 1942 | Manchukuo | W | 3–1 | Xinjing, Manchukuo | International Friendly |
| 10 August 1942 | Mengjiang | W | 12–0 | Xinjing, Manchukuo | International Friendly |
| 16 August 1942 | (Korea) Chosen | L | 0–5 | (Japan) Seoul, Chosen | International Friendly |
