= 1955 Emperor's Cup =

Tournament details
- Country: Japan

Final positions
- Champions: All Kwangaku
- Runners-up: Chuo University Club
- Semifinalists: All Rikkyo; Osaka Club

Statistics of Emperor's Cup in the 1955 season.

== Overview ==
It was contested by 16 teams, and All Kwangaku won the championship.

== Results ==
=== 1st Round ===
- All Rikkyo 4–0 Muroran Kiren
- All Kansai University 4–1 Rokko Club
- Matsuyama Club 0–5 Toyo Industries
- Waseda University 2–2 (lottery) Chuo University Club
- Nippon Light Metal 3–1 Yawata Steel
- Keio BRB 2–3 Osaka Club
- Tohoku Gakuin University 4–1 Meiji University
- All Kwangaku 4–0 Toyama University Club

=== Quarterfinals ===
- All Rikkyo 1–0 All Kansai University
- Toyo Industries 0–1 Chuo University Club
- Nippon Light Metal 1–2 Osaka Club
- Tohoku Gakuin University 0–7 All Kwangaku

=== Semifinals ===
- All Rikkyo 1–2 Chuo University Club
- Osaka Club 0–4 All Kwangaku

=== Final ===
- Chuo University Club 3–4 All Kwangaku

All Kwangaku won the championship.
