= 1958 Emperor's Cup =

Tournament details
- Country: Japan

Final positions
- Champions: Kwangaku Club
- Runners-up: Yawata Steel
- Semifinalists: Shida Soccer; University of Tokyo

Statistics of Emperor's Cup in the 1958 season.

== Overview ==
It was contested by 16 teams, and Kwangaku Club won the championship.

== Results ==
=== 1st Round ===
- Toyama Shukyu-dan 0–6 Chuo University Club
- Meiyu Club 0–2 Shida Soccer
- Hakodate City Hall 1–6 Keio BRB
- Nambu Shukyu-dan 0–18 Kwangaku Club
- Nagoya Soccer 0–3 Toyo Industries
- Kyoto Shiko 2–3 University of Tokyo LB
- Kwangaku Club 5–1 Ehime Club
- Waseda University 1–3 Yawata Steel

=== Quarterfinals ===
- Chuo University Club 0–1 Shida Soccer
- Keio BRB 0–1 Kwangaku Club
- Toyo Industries 0–1 University of Tokyo LB
- Kwangaku Club 0–2 Yawata Steel

=== Semifinals ===
- Shida Soccer 0–3 Kwangaku Club
- University of Tokyo LB 0–1 Yawata Steel

=== Final ===
- Kwangaku Club 2–1 Yawata Steel

Kwangaku Club won the championship.
