= Rijo Shukyu-Dan =

Japanese amateur football club

Rijo Shukyu-Dan (Rijo Club) 鯉城蹴球団（鯉城クラブ）
- Founded: 1923
- Dissolved: 1930
Home colours	Away colours

Rijo Shukyu-Dan (鯉城蹴球団（鯉城クラブ）, Rijō Shūkyū Dan (Rijō Club)) was a Japanese amateur football club based in Hiroshima. The club name "Rijo" came from the nickname of the Hiroshima Castle.

== History ==
The club was founded by the students and alumni of the Hiroshima Daiichi Chūgaku, the former Hiroshima Kokutaiji High School, in 1923. It was one of the oldest Japanese football club team in Japan.

The club won the "Ah-shiki Shūkyū Zenkoku Yūshō Taikai", the former Emperor's Cup in 1924 and 1925. And the Emperor's Cup was canceled, because of the death of the Emperor Taishō, in 1926. Then the club tried to keep the championship for three years seasons but the club lost the final match in 1927.

The club had the friendly matches with Korean football clubs in Seoul in 1927. And the club was dissolved in 1930.

The football team of the Hiroshima Daiichi Chūgaku won the "Zenkoku Chūgakkō Shūkyū Senshukai Taikai", the former All Japan High School Soccer Tournament, in 1936, 1939, and finished second in 1925, 1927, 1930.

== Titles ==
- Emperor's Cup: Winner: 1924, 1925
- Emperor's Cup: Runners-up: 1927

== See also ==
- Hiroshima Kōtō-shihan
- Sanfrecce Hiroshima
- Emperor's Cup
- Tokyo Shukyu-Dan
