= 1934 in Japanese football =

1934 season

Japanese football in 1934.

== National team ==
=== Results ===
1934.05.13	Japan	1–7	Dutch East Indies	Manila, Philippines
	Kawamoto 52'	JFA	? ?' ? ?' ? ?' ? ?' ? ?' ? ?' ? ?'

1934.05.15	Japan	4–3	Philippines	Manila, Philippines
	Kawamoto 30'; Otani 47'; Nishimura 52'; Nozawa 67'	JFA	? ?' ? ?' ? ?'

1934.05.20	Japan	3–4	Republic of China	Manila, Philippines
	Nozawa 60', 72'; Natori 74'	JFA	? ?' ? ?' ? ?' ? ?'

=== Players statistics ===
Player	-1933	05.13	05.15	05.20	1934	Total
Yukio Goto	2(0)	O	-	O	2(0)	4(0)
Akira Nozawa	0(0)	O	O(1)	O(2)	3(3)	3(3)
Taizo Kawamoto	0(0)	O(1)	O(1)	O	3(2)	3(2)
Ichiji Otani	0(0)	O	O(1)	O	3(1)	3(1)
Takashi Kawanishi	0(0)	O	O	O	3(0)	3(0)
Teiichi Matsumaru	0(0)	O	O	O	3(0)	3(0)
Hideo Sakai	0(0)	O	O	O	3(0)	3(0)
Shiro Misaki	0(0)	O	O	O	3(0)	3(0)
Shoichi Nishimura	0(0)	O	O(1)	-	2(1)	2(1)
Teruo Abe	0(0)	O	O	-	2(0)	2(0)
Hiroshi Kanazawa	0(0)	O	O	-	2(0)	2(0)
Shunichi Kumai	0(0)	O	-	O	2(0)	2(0)
Motoo Tatsuhara	0(0)	O	-	O	2(0)	2(0)
Tadao Horie	0(0)	-	O	O	2(0)	2(0)
Tokutaro Ukon	0(0)	-	O	O	2(0)	2(0)
Takeshi Natori	0(0)	-	-	O(1)	1(1)	1(1)
Yasuo Suzuki	0(0)	-	O	-	1(0)	1(0)

== Births ==
- March 3 - Yasuo Takamori
- April 21 - Masao Uchino
- April 21 - Kenzo Ohashi
- July 5 - Yoshio Furukawa
- August 13 - Gyoji Matsumoto
