= 1951 Emperor's Cup final =

1951 Emperor's Cup Final
Keio BRB	Osaka Club
3	2
- Date: May 27, 1951
- Venue: Miyagino Football Stadium, Miyagi

1951 Emperor's Cup Final was the 31st final of the Emperor's Cup competition. The final was played at Miyagino Football Stadium in Miyagi on May 27, 1951. Keio BRB won the championship.

== Overview ==
Keio BRB with Yukio Tsuda and Hirokazu Ninomiya on the team won the championship, by defeating Osaka Club 3–2. Osaka Club was featured a squad consisting of Taro Kagawa, Toshio Iwatani and Taizo Kawamoto.

== Match details ==
May 27, 1951

Keio BRB	3–2	Osaka Club
? ?' ? ?' ? ?'		? ?' ? ?'

Miyagino Football Stadium

== See also ==
- 1951 Emperor's Cup
