= Dutch East Indies national football team results =

This page details the match results and statistics of the Dutch East Indies national football team.

== Key ==
Key to matches

- Att.=Match attendance
- (H)=Home ground
- (A)=Away ground
- (N)=Neutral ground

Key to record by opponent

- Pld=Games played
- W=Games won
- D=Games drawn
- L=Games lost
- GF=Goals for
- GA=Goals against

== Results ==
Dutch East Indies' score is shown first in each case.

| No. | Date | Venue | Opponents | Score | Competition | Dutch East Indies scorers | Att. | Ref. |
|---|---|---|---|---|---|---|---|---|
| 1 | 13 May 1934 | Rizal Memorial Stadium, Manila (N) | Japan | 7–1 | 1934 Far Eastern Games | Jahn (3), Hong Djien, Hian Goan (3) | — | |
| 2 | 14 May 1934 | Rizal Memorial Stadium, Manila (N) | China | 0–2 | 1934 Far Eastern Games | | 12,000 | |
| 3 | 19 May 1934 | Rizal Memorial Stadium, Manila (N) | Philippines | 2–3 | 1934 Far Eastern Games | Lontoh (2) | — | |
| — | 25 January 1938 | Saigon (N) | Japan | w/o | 1938 FIFA World Cup qualification | | — | |
| — | 26 May 1938 | Rotterdam (N) | United States | w/o | 1938 FIFA World Cup qualification | | — | |
| 4 | 5 June 1938 | Vélodrome Municipal, Reims (N) | Hungary | 0–6 | 1938 FIFA World Cup | | 8,000 | |
| 5 | 26 June 1938 | Olympic Stadium, Amsterdam (A) | Netherlands | 2–9 | Friendly | Taihuttu, Pattiwael | 50,000 | |

Notes

1. Note 1: On 17 August 1945, the Dutch East Indies proclaimed independence from the Netherlands as Indonesia, although this was not recognised until 27 December 1949. For results after 27 December 1949, see Indonesia national football team results (1950–1979), Indonesia national football team results (1980–1999), Indonesia national football team results (2000–2009), Indonesia national football team results (2010–2019) and Indonesia national football team results (2020–present).
2. A: Japan withdrew from qualifying for the 1938 FIFA World Cup so the Dutch East Indies were awarded a walkover. They would have qualified automatically for the competition but FIFA ordered a play-off against the United States instead.
3. B: The United States had planned to fund their trip to Europe for the 1938 FIFA World Cup with a friendly match against England to celebrate the 25th anniversary of the United States Soccer Federation. England refused to play the match on a Sunday so it was cancelled and the United States were forced to withdraw. The Dutch East Indies were awarded a walkover and qualified for the 1938 FIFA World Cup.

== Record by opponent ==
| Team | Pld | W | D | L | GF | GA | GD | WPCT |
|---|---|---|---|---|---|---|---|---|
| China | 1 | 0 | 0 | 1 | 0 | 2 | −2 | 0.00 |
| Japan | 1 | 1 | 0 | 0 | 7 | 1 | +6 | 100.00 |
| Hungary | 1 | 0 | 0 | 1 | 0 | 6 | −6 | 0.00 |
| Netherlands | 1 | 0 | 0 | 1 | 2 | 9 | −7 | 0.00 |
| Philippines | 1 | 0 | 0 | 1 | 2 | 3 | −1 | 0.00 |
| Total | 5 | 1 | 0 | 4 | 11 | 21 | −10 | 20.00 |

Source: Results
