= 1951 in Japanese football =

1951 season

Japanese football in 1951.

== Emperor's Cup ==
May 27, 1951

Keio BRB	3–2	Osaka Club
? ?' ? ?' ? ?'		? ?' ? ?'

Miyagino Football Stadium

== National team ==
=== Results ===
1951.03.07	Japan	0–0 (a.e.t.)	Iran	New Delhi, India
		JFA		Attendance: 25,000

1951.03.08	Japan	2–3	Iran	New Delhi, India
	Tokita 43'; Ninomiya 57'	JFA	? ?' ? ?' ? ?'

1951.03.09	Japan	2–0	Afghanistan	New Delhi, India
	Iwatani 47', 51'	JFA

=== Players statistics ===
Player	-1950	03.07	03.08	03.09	1951	Total
Yukio Tsuda	1(0)	O	O	O	3(0)	4(0)
Hirokazu Ninomiya	1(0)	O	O(1)	-	2(1)	3(1)
Toshio Iwatani	0(0)	O	O	O(2)	3(2)	3(2)
Masanori Tokita	0(0)	O	O(1)	O	3(1)	3(1)
Megumu Tamura	0(0)	O	O	O	3(0)	3(0)
Yoshio Okada	0(0)	O	O	O	3(0)	3(0)
Koji Miyata	0(0)	O	O	O	3(0)	3(0)
Ko Arima	0(0)	O	O	O	3(0)	3(0)
Takashi Kano	0(0)	O	O	O	3(0)	3(0)
Shigeo Sugimoto	0(0)	O	O	-	2(0)	2(0)
Taro Kagawa	0(0)	O	O	-	2(0)	2(0)
Nobuyuki Kato	0(0)	-	-	O	1(0)	1(0)
Ken Noritake	0(0)	-	-	O	1(0)	1(0)
Seki Matsunaga	0(0)	-	-	O	1(0)	1(0)

== Births ==
- April 15 - Choei Sato
- June 28 - Kazumi Takada
- July 7 - Shigemi Ishii
- July 27 - Kazuo Saito
