= Yoshinori Shigematsu =

Japanese footballer (1930–2018)

Yoshinori Shigematsu 重松 良典
Personal information
- Full name: Yoshinori Shigematsu
- Date of birth: April 2, 1930
- Place of birth: Hiroshima, Hiroshima, Empire of Japan
- Date of death: 2018 (aged 87–88)
- Position: Forward

Youth career
- 1946–1948: Hiroshima Daiichi High School
- 1949–1953: Keio University

Senior career*
Years	Team	Apps	(Gls)
1954–????	Toyo Industries		

International career
1958	Japan	1	(0)
Medal record
All Keio
Winner	Emperor's Cup	1952
Toyo Industries
Runner-up	Emperor's Cup	1954
Runner-up	Emperor's Cup	1957
- * Club domestic league appearances and goals

Yoshinori Shigematsu (重松 良典, Shigematsu Yoshinori; April 2, 1930 – 2018) was a Japanese football player. He played for Japan national team.

== Club career ==
Shigematsu was born in Hiroshima on April 2, 1930. When he played for Keio University, he won 1952 Emperor's Cup as a member of All Keio. After graduating from Keio University, he joined his local club Toyo Industries in 1954. He won the 2nd place at 1954 and 1957 Emperor's Cup. At 1954 Emperor's Cup, it was first Emperor's Cup finalist as a works team.

== National team career ==
In May 1958, Shigematsu was selected Japan national team for 1958 Asian Games. At this competition, on May 28, he debuted against Hong Kong.

== After retirement ==
After retirement, in 1974 Shigematsu became a president of his local baseball club Hiroshima Toyo Carp. In 1981, he moved to Fujita Industries (later Bellmare Hiratsuka) and became a president of the club in 1997. In 1999, he left the club. He died in 2018.

== National team statistics ==
Japan national team
Year	Apps	Goals
1958	1	0
Total	1	0
