= Tadao Horie =

Japanese footballer

Tadao Horie 堀江 忠男
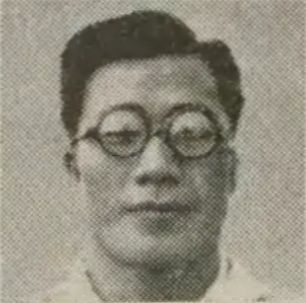
- Tadao Horie, July 1936

Personal information
- Full name: Tadao Horie
- Date of birth: September 13, 1913
- Place of birth: Hamamatsu, Shizuoka, Empire of Japan
- Date of death: March 29, 2003 (aged 89)
- Place of death: Nakano, Tokyo, Japan
- Height: 1.67 m (5 ft 5 1/2 in)
- Position: Defender

Youth career
- ????: Hamamatsu Daiichi High School
- ????–1935: Waseda University

Senior career*
Years	Team	Apps	(Gls)
- Waseda WMW

International career
1934–1936	Japan	3	(0)
- * Club domestic league appearances and goals

Tadao Horie (堀江 忠男, Horie Tadao; September 13, 1913 – March 29, 2003) was a Japanese football player. He played for Japan national team.

== Club career ==
Horie was born in Hamamatsu on September 13, 1913. He played for Waseda WMW, which was consisted of players from his alma mater, Waseda University. At that club, he played with many futures Japan national team players, such as Motoo Tatsuhara, Yasuo Suzuki, and others.

== National team career ==

Miracle of Berlin (1936 Olympics 1st round v Sweden on August 4)

In May 1934, when Horie was a Waseda University student, he was selected by the Japan national team for the 1934 Far Eastern Championship Games in Manila. At that competition, on May 15, he debuted against Philippines. In 1936, he was also selected by Japan for the 1936 Summer Olympics in Berlin. At the 1936 Summer Olympics, he played against Sweden, and Japan completed a come-from-behind victory. It was the first victory in the Olympics for Japan and a historic victory over one of the powerhouses, the team became later known as the "Miracle of Berlin" (ベルリンの奇跡) in Japan. In 2016, the team was selected for the Japan Football Hall of Fame. However, he fractured his right arm in the match, and could not play in the next game against Italy. He played three games for Japan until 1936.

== Coaching career ==
After 1936 Summer Olympics, Horie retired from his playing career and joined the Asahi Shimbun. In 1951, he became a professor at his alma mater, Waseda University. He also became a manager for Waseda University and instructed many international players like Shigeo Yaegashi, Saburo Kawabuchi, Masakatsu Miyamoto, Kunishige Kamamoto, and others.

On March 29, 2003, Horie died of pneumonia in Nakano, Tokyo at the age of 89.

== National team statistics ==
Japan national team
Year	Apps	Goals
1934	2	0
1935	0	0
1936	1	0
Total	3	0
