= Mutsuhiko Nomura =

Japanese footballer and manager

Mutsuhiko Nomura 野村 六彦
Personal information
- Full name: Mutsuhiko Nomura
- Date of birth: February 10, 1940 (age 86)
- Place of birth: Hiroshima, Hiroshima, Japan
- Height: 1.65 m (5 ft 5 in)
- Position: Forward

Youth career
- 1956–1958: Hiroshima Funairi High School
- 1959–1962: Chuo University

Senior career*
Years	Team	Apps	(Gls)
1963–1975	Hitachi	136	(36)
Total		136	(36)

Managerial career
- 1979–1981: Hitachi
Medal record
Chuo University
Winner	Emperor's Cup	1962
Hitachi
Winner	Japan Soccer League	1972
Runner-up	Japan Soccer League	1973
Winner	Emperor's Cup	1972
Winner	Emperor's Cup	1975
Runner-up	Emperor's Cup	1963
Runner-up	Emperor's Cup	1973
- * Club domestic league appearances and goals

Mutsuhiko Nomura (野村 六彦, Nomura Mutsuhiko; born February 10, 1940) is a former Japanese football player and manager.

== Playing career ==
Nomura was born in Hiroshima on February 10, 1940. He played at Chuo University and won 1962 Emperor's Cup with Aritatsu Ogi, Yasuyuki Kuwahara and so on. After graduating from university, he joined Hitachi in 1963. In 1965, he played 14 games and scored 15 goals in Japan Soccer League first season. He became first top scorer. In 1972 season, the club won the championship. He was also elected Best Eleven and Japanese Footballer of the Year award. He retired in 1975.

== Coaching career ==
In 1974, Nomura playing for Hitachi also became an assistant coach for the club. In 1979, he became a manager for Hitachi. In 1981, he resigned. In 2014, he was selected Japan Football Hall of Fame.

== Senior league ==
Nomura currently plays in the Soccer For Life league, an amateur Japanese football league for players past the age of 60.

== Honours ==
=== Club ===
- Japan Soccer League Division 1: 1972

=== Individual ===
- Japan Soccer League top scorer: 1965
- Japanese Footballer of the Year: 1972
- Japan Football Hall of Fame: Inducted in 2014
