= Hiroshi Kagawa =

Japanese footballer and journalist (1924–2024)

Personal information
- Date of birth: 29 December 1924
- Place of birth: Kobe, Hyogo, Empire of Japan
- Date of death: 5 December 2024 (aged 99)
- Place of death: Kobe, Japan
- Position: Forward

Youth career
- Kobe High School

College career
Years	Team	Apps	(Gls)
- Kobe University of Commerce

Senior career*
Years	Team	Apps	(Gls)
- Osaka SC
- * Club domestic league appearances and goals

Hiroshi Kagawa (29 December 1924 – 5 December 2024) was a Japanese football player and journalist. His brother Taro Kagawa was also a footballer.

== Playing career ==
Hiroshi Kagawa was born in Kobe on 29 December 1924. After graduating from Kobe University of Commerce, he played for Osaka SC as a forward. He and his team won second place at 1952 Emperor's Cup. His teammates included Taro Kagawa, Taizo Kawamoto, and Toshio Iwatani.

== Journalist career ==
Kagawa started a journalist career in 1951. In 1952, he joined Sankei Shimbun. He also served as editor of Sankei Sports from 1974 to 1984. In 1990, he retired and then became a freelance journalist. He also produced Japan Soccer Archive with Japan Football Museum from 2007. In 2010, he was selected Japan Football Hall of Fame. He covered ten World Cups. At the 2014 World Cup, he was 89 years old and was the oldest media representative on duty. On 12 January 2015, he was presented with the FIFA Presidential Award at the 2014 FIFA Ballon d'Or by President Sepp Blatter.

== Death ==
Kagawa died in Kobe on 5 December 2024, at the age of 99.

== Honours ==
- Japan Football Hall of Fame: Inducted in 2010
