= Motoo Tatsuhara =

Japanese footballer

Motoo Tatsuhara 立原 元夫
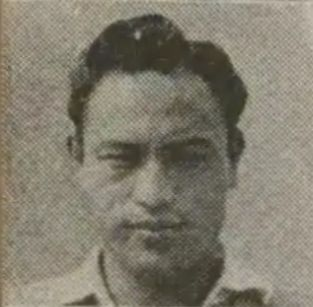
- Motoo Tatsuhara, July 1936

Personal information
- Full name: Motoo Tatsuhara
- Date of birth: January 14, 1913
- Place of birth: Shinagawa, Tokyo, Empire of Japan
- Height: 1.64 m (5 ft 4 1/2 in)
- Position: Midfielder

Youth career
- 1933–1936: Waseda University

Senior career*
Years	Team	Apps	(Gls)
- Waseda WMW

International career
1934–1936	Japan	4	(0)
- * Club domestic league appearances and goals

Motoo Tatsuhara (立原 元夫, Tatsuhara Motoo; January 14, 1913 – ?) was a Japanese football player. He played for Japan national team.

== Club career ==
Tatsuhara was born in Shinagawa, Tokyo on January 14, 1913. He played for Waseda WMW was consisted of his alma mater Waseda University players and graduates. At the club, he played with many Japan national team players Taizo Kawamoto, Tadao Horie, Yasuo Suzuki, Kunitaka Sueoka, Takashi Kano and so on. He won the 2nd place at 1940 Emperor's Cup. This tournament was the last Emperor's Cup before the war because Emperor's Cup was suspended for World War II from 1941 to 1945.

== National team career ==

Miracle of Berlin (1936 Olympics 1st round v Sweden on August 4)

In May 1934, when Tatsuhara was a Waseda University student, he was selected Japan national team for 1934 Far Eastern Championship Games in Manila. At this competition, on May 13, he debuted against Dutch East Indies. In 1936, he was also selected Japan for 1936 Summer Olympics in Berlin. Japan completed a come-from-behind victory first game against Sweden. The first victory in Olympics for the Japan and the historic victory over one of the powerhouses became later known as "Miracle of Berlin" (ベルリンの奇跡) in Japan. In 2016, this team was selected Japan Football Hall of Fame. He played 4 games for Japan until 1936.

== National team statistics ==
Japan national team
Year	Apps	Goals
1934	2	0
1935	0	0
1936	2	0
Total	4	0
