= Hirokazu Ninomiya =

Japanese footballer and manager

Hirokazu Ninomiya 二宮 洋一
Personal information
- Full name: Hirokazu Ninomiya
- Date of birth: 22 November 1917
- Place of birth: Hyogo, Empire of Japan
- Date of death: 7 March 2000 (aged 82)
- Place of death: Minato, Tokyo, Japan
- Position: Forward

Youth career
- Kobe Daiichi High School

College career
| Years | Team | Apps | (Gls) |
| 1935–1941 | Keio University | | |

Senior career*
| Years | Team | Apps | (Gls) |
- Keio BRB

International career
| 1940–1954 | Japan | 6 | (1) |

Managerial career
- 1951: Japan
Medal record
Keio University
| Winner | Emperor's Cup | 1937 |
Keio BRB
| Winner | Emperor's Cup | 1936 |
| Winner | Emperor's Cup | 1939 |
| Winner | Emperor's Cup | 1940 |
| Winner | Emperor's Cup | 1951 |
| Winner | Emperor's Cup | 1954 |
All Keio
| Winner | Emperor's Cup | 1952 |
Representing Japan
Asian Games
| Bronze medal – third place | 1951 New Delhi | Team |
- * Club domestic league appearances and goals

Hirokazu Ninomiya (二宮 洋一, Ninomiya Hirokazu; 22 November 1917 – 7 March 2000) was a Japanese football player and manager. He played for Japan national team. He also managed Japan national team.

== Club career ==
Ninomiya was born in Hyogo Prefecture on 22 November 1917. He played for Keio BRB was consisted of his alma mater Keio University players and graduates. He won Emperor's Cup 7 times (1936, 1937, 1939, 1940, 1951, 1952 and 1954).

== National team career ==
On 16 June 1940, when Ninomiya was a Keio University student, he debuted for Japan national team against Philippines and Japan won the match. This match was the first match since 1936 Summer Olympics and the only match in the 1940s in Japan's International A Match due to World War II.

After World War II, Japan national team was resumed activities in 1951. Ninomiya played as playing manager at 1951 Asian Games. He also played at 1954 Asian Games. He played 6 games and scored 1 goal for Japan until 1954.

== Coaching career ==
After World War II, in 1951, player Ninomiya named manager for Japan national team for 1951 Asian Games and he managed 3 matches as playing manager. After 1951 Asian Games, he resigned.

On 7 March 2000, Ninomiya died of pneumonia in Tokyo at the age of 82. In 2006, he was selected Japan Football Hall of Fame.

== National team statistics ==
Japan national team
| Year | Apps | Goals |
|---|---|---|
| 1940 | 1 | 0 |
| 1941 | 0 | 0 |
| 1942 | 0 | 0 |
| 1943 | 0 | 0 |
| 1944 | 0 | 0 |
| 1945 | 0 | 0 |
| 1946 | 0 | 0 |
| 1947 | 0 | 0 |
| 1948 | 0 | 0 |
| 1949 | 0 | 0 |
| 1950 | 0 | 0 |
| 1951 | 2 | 1 |
| 1952 | 0 | 0 |
| 1953 | 0 | 0 |
| 1954 | 3 | 0 |
| Total | 6 | 1 |

== Honours ==
Japan

- Asian Games Bronze medal: 1951

Individual

- Japan Football Hall of Fame: Inducted in 2006
