= Saburō Kawabuchi =

Japanese footballer and manager

Saburo Kawabuchi 川淵 三郎
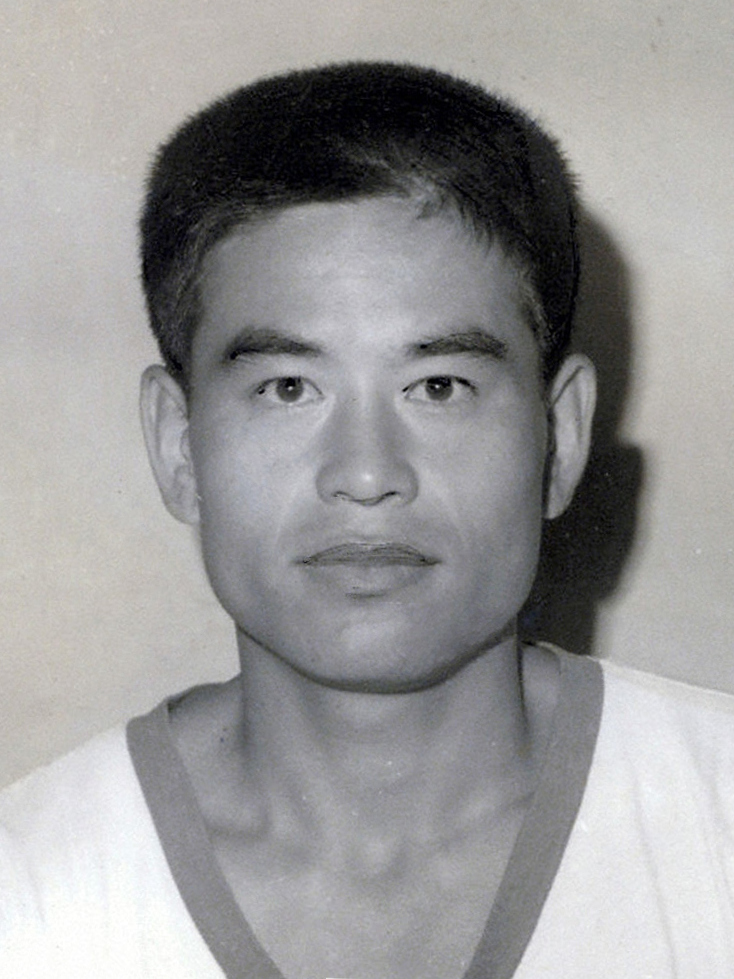
- Kawabuchi in 1964

Personal information
- Full name: Saburo Kawabuchi
- Date of birth: December 3, 1936 (age 89)
- Place of birth: Takaishi, Osaka, Japan
- Position: Forward

Youth career
- 1952–1954: Mikunigaoka High School

College career
Years	Team	Apps	(Gls)
1957–1960	Waseda University		

Senior career*
Years	Team	Apps	(Gls)
1961–1970	Furukawa Electric	68	(10)
Total		68	(10)

International career
1958–1965	Japan	26	(8)

Managerial career
- 1973–1975: Furukawa Electric
- 1980–1981: Japan
Medal record
Furukawa Electric
Runner-up	Japan Soccer League	1967
Winner	Emperor's Cup	1961
Winner	Emperor's Cup	1964
Runner-up	Emperor's Cup	1962
- * Club domestic league appearances and goals

Saburo Kawabuchi (川淵 三郎, Kawabuchi Saburō; born December 3, 1936) is a Japanese former footballer and football manager. He played for and managed the Japan national team. He is the founder and honorary chairman of the J.League. Between 2002 and 2008, he served as president of the Japan Football Association.

== Early life ==
Kawabuchi was born in Takaishi on December 3, 1936. At first, when he was in Takaishi elementary school and Takaishi Junior high school, he played baseball. He was on to Mikunigaoka High School, Osaka and became a member of football team at the high school. He graduated from Mikunigaoka High School, Osaka in 1955. He went on to Waseda University School of commerce in 1957. He played for the Waseda University football team. He earned a bachelor of arts degree in commerce from Waseda University.

== Club career ==
After graduating from Waseda University, Kawabuchi played for Furukawa Electric, in the early days of the Japan Soccer League. In the initial league season, he was the first player to score a hat-trick, against Nagoya Mutual Bank. He retired in 1970, having played 68 games and scored 10 goals in the league.

== National team career ==
On December 25, 1958, when Kawabuchi was a Waseda University student, he debuted and scored 2 goals for Japan national team against Hong Kong. In 1962, he played at 1962 Asian Games. In 1964, he was selected Japan for 1964 Summer Olympics in Tokyo. At 1964 Summer Olympics, he scored a goal in first match against Argentina. He also played at 1962 Asian Games. He played 26 games and scored 8 goals for Japan until 1965.

== Coaching career ==
After retirement, Kawabuchi became a coach for Furukawa Electric in 1970. In 1973, he became a manager and managed until 1975. Just before 1982 World Cup qualification in December 1980, he was named manager for the Japan national team and replaced Masashi Watanabe, who suffered a subarachnoid hemorrhage. Kawabuchi managed Japan at the 1982 World Cup qualification and managed until March 1981.

In 1991, he was named the inaugural chairman of the J.League, as the first professional league in Japan. In 1991, he also became the first chairman of the J.League. In 2002, he resigned as chairman of the J.League and became the 10th president of the Japan Football Association as Shunichiro Okano's successor. Kawabuchi served until 2008. He also served as president of the Japan Basketball Association from May 2015 to June 2016.

In 2006, he received the FIFA Order of Merit. In 2008, he was also selected for the Japan Football Hall of Fame.

== Later years ==
Kawabuchi serves as a councilor on the organizing committee for the 2020 Summer Olympic and Paralympic Games. He had been requested by former Prime Minister Yoshirō Mori to succeed him as committee chairperson in February 2021, but Kawabuchi later said that he would not accept the request.

== Club statistics ==
Club performance			League	
Season	Club	League	Apps	Goals
Japan			League	
1965	Furukawa Electric	JSL Division 1	14	3
1966	Furukawa Electric	JSL Division 1	14	4
1967	Furukawa Electric	JSL Division 1	14	1
1968	Furukawa Electric	JSL Division 1	14	1
1969	Furukawa Electric	JSL Division 1	12	1
1970	Furukawa Electric	JSL Division 1	0	0
Total			68	10

== National team statistics ==
Japan national team
Year	Apps	Goals
1958	2	2
1959	9	3
1960	1	0
1961	6	1
1962	6	2
1963	0	0
1964	0	0
1965	2	0
Total	26	8

== Awards and honours ==
- Japan Soccer League Silver Ball (Assist Leader): 1966
- Japan Football Hall of Fame: Inducted in 2008
- Order of the Rising Sun, 2nd Class, Gold and Silver Star: 2009
- Person of Cultural Merit: 2015
- Order of Culture: 2023

== Books ==
- J's career – With Japan football, Nihon Keizai Shimbun Shuppan, 2009
