= Yasuo Suzuki =

Japanese footballer

Yasuo Suzuki 鈴木 保男
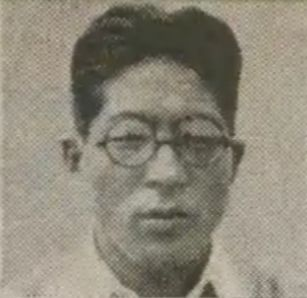
- Yasuo Suzuki, July 1936

Personal information
- Full name: Yasuo Suzuki
- Date of birth: 30 April 1913
- Place of birth: Kanagawa, Empire of Japan
- Position: Defender

Youth career
- ????: Tokyo Daihachi High School
- ????–1935: Waseda University

Senior career*
Years	Team	Apps	(Gls)
- Waseda WMW

International career
1934–1936	Japan	2	(0)
- * Club domestic league appearances and goals

Yasuo Suzuki (鈴木 保男, Suzuki Yasuo; 30 April 1913 – ?) was a Japanese football player. He played for Japan national team.

== Club career ==
Suzuki was born in Kanagawa Prefecture on 30 April 1913. He played for Waseda WMW was consisted of his alma mater Waseda University players and graduates. At this club, he played many Japan national team players Motoo Tatsuhara, Tadao Horie and so on.

== National team career ==
In May 1934, when Suzuki was a Waseda University student, he was selected Japan national team for 1934 Far Eastern Championship Games in Manila. At this competition, on 15 May, he debuted against Philippines. In 1936, he was selected Japan for 1936 Summer Olympics in Berlin. Japan completed a come-from-behind victory first match against Sweden. The first victory in Olympics for the Japan and the historic victory over one of the powerhouses became later known as "Miracle of Berlin" (ベルリンの奇跡) in Japan. In 2016, this team was selected Japan Football Hall of Fame. He did not play in against Sweden. However, he played next match against Italy instead of Tadao Horie fractured his right arm. He played 2 games for Japan until 1936.

== National team statistics ==
Japan national team
Year	Apps	Goals
1934	1	0
1935	0	0
1936	1	0
Total	2	0
