= Ken Naganuma =

Japanese footballer and manager (1930–2008)

Ken Naganuma 長沼 健
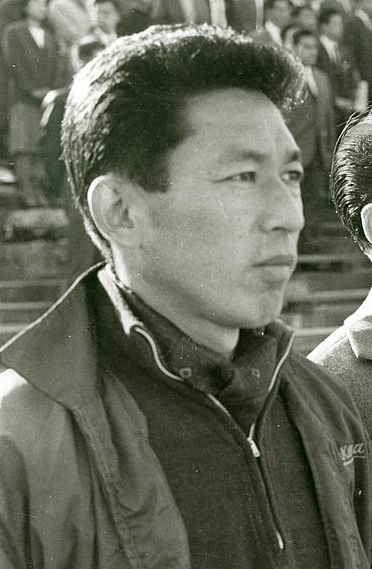
- Naganuma in 1963

Personal information
- Full name: Ken Naganuma
- Date of birth: 5 September 1930
- Place of birth: Hiroshima, Hiroshima, Japan
- Date of death: 2 June 2008 (aged 77)
- Place of death: Japan
- Position: Forward

Youth career
- 1946–1948: Hiroshima Normal School

College career
| Years | Team | Apps | (Gls) |
| 1949–1952 | Kwansei Gakuin University | | |
| 1953–1954 | Chuo University | | |

Senior career*
| Years | Team | Apps | (Gls) |
| 1955–1967 | Furukawa Electric | 19 | (8) |
| Total | | 19 | (8) |

International career
| 1954–1961 | Japan | 4 | (1) |

Managerial career
- 1959–1961: Furukawa Electric
- 1962–1969: Japan
- 1972–1976: Japan
Medal record
All Kwangaku
| Winner | Emperor's Cup | 1950 |
Furukawa Electric
| Runner-up | Japan Soccer League | 1967 |
| Winner | Emperor's Cup | 1960 |
| Winner | Emperor's Cup | 1961 |
| Winner | Emperor's Cup | 1964 |
| Runner-up | Emperor's Cup | 1962 |
- * Club domestic league appearances and goals

Ken Naganuma (長沼 健, Naganuma Ken; 5 September 1930 – 2 June 2008) was a Japanese football player and manager. A forward, he earned four caps for the Japan national team between 1954 and 1961 and later also served as the team's manager. He was also the president of the Japan Football Association from 1994 to 1998.

== Club career ==
Naganuma was born in Hiroshima on 5 September 1930. After graduating from Kwansei Gakuin University and Chuo University, he joined Furukawa Electric in 1955. Furukawa Electric won 1960, 1961 and 1964 Emperor's Cup. In 1961, he was selected first Japanese Footballer of the Year awards. In 1965, Furukawa Electric joined new league Japan Soccer League. He played 19 games and scored 8 goals in the league. He retired in 1967.

== National team career ==
In March 1954, Naganuma was selected for the Japan national team for 1954 World Cup qualification. At this qualification, on 7 March, he debuted and scored a goal against South Korea. He also played at 1954 Asian Games. In 1956, He was selected in the Japan squad for the 1956 Summer Olympics. However, he could not play for physical condition. He played 4 games and scored 1 goal for Japan until 1961.

== Coaching career ==
In 1959, when Naganuma was still a player, he became a manager for Furukawa Electric. In 1960, he helped the club become 1960 Emperor's Cup champions. This was the first Emperor's Cup champions as a works team. In 1962, when he was 32 years old, he was named as the manager for Japan national team as Hidetoki Takahashi's successor. He managed Japan with assistant coach Shunichiro Okano at 1964 Summer Olympics in Tokyo and 1968 Summer Olympics in Mexico City. At 1968 Summer Olympics, Japan won Bronze Medal. This is the first time an Asian team won a medal at Olympics. In 2018, this team was selected Japan Football Hall of Fame. He also managed at 1966 Asian Games. In 1969, he resigned after 1970 World Cup qualification and Okano was promoted to new manager.

At 1972 Summer Olympics qualification, following Japan's failure to qualify for 1972 Summer Olympics, Okano resigned and Naganuma became a manager again in 1972. He managed 1974 World Cup qualification and 1974 Asian Games. At 1976 Summer Olympics qualification in April 1976, following Japan's failure to qualify for 1976 Summer Olympics, Naganuma resigned.

Naganuma became a vice-president of Japan Football Association (JFA) in 1987 and a president of JFA in 1994. He also served as vice-president World Cup bidding committee and Japan World Cup Organizing Committee for 2002 World Cup. In 1998, he resigned a president of JFA. In 2005, he was selected Japan Football Hall of Fame.

On 2 June 2008, Naganuma died of pneumonia at the age of 77.

== Club statistics ==
| Club performance | | | League | |
| Season | Club | League | Apps | Goals |
| Japan | | | League | |
|---|---|---|---|---|
| 1965 | Furukawa Electric | JSL Division 1 | | 6 |
| 1966 | Furukawa Electric | JSL Division 1 | | 2 |
| 1967 | Furukawa Electric | JSL Division 1 | 0 | 0 |
| Total | | | 19 | 8 |

== National team statistics ==
Japan national team
| Year | Apps | Goals |
|---|---|---|
| 1954 | 2 | 1 |
| 1955 | 0 | 0 |
| 1956 | 0 | 0 |
| 1957 | 0 | 0 |
| 1958 | 1 | 0 |
| 1959 | 0 | 0 |
| 1960 | 0 | 0 |
| 1961 | 1 | 0 |
| Total | 4 | 1 |

=== National team goals ===
| # | Date | Venue | Opponent | Score | Result | Competition |
|---|---|---|---|---|---|---|
| 1. | 7 March 1954 | Meiji Jingu Gaien Stadium, Tokyo, Japan | South Korea | 1-5 | Lost | 1954 FIFA World Cup Q. |

== Honours ==
- Order of the Rising Sun, 3rd Class, Gold Rays with Neck Ribbon: 2004
- Japan Football Hall of Fame: Inducted in 2005
