= Christopher McDonald (disambiguation) =

Christopher McDonald (born 1955) is an American actor.

Christopher McDonald may also refer to:

- Christopher McDonald (jurist) (born 1974)
- Christopher W. McDonald (1931–2011), English footballer and businessman
- Christopher McDonald, actor in the 2025 Superman film

== See also ==
- Chris McDonald
