= 1983 JSL Cup final =

Yanmar Diesel	Nissan Motors
1	0
- Date: June 26, 1983
- Venue: Yamanashi Prefectural Stadium, Yamanashi

1983 JSL Cup final was the eighth final of the JSL Cup competition. The final was played at Yamanashi Prefectural Stadium in Yamanashi on June 26, 1983. Yanmar Diesel won the championship.

== Overview ==
Yanmar Diesel won their 2nd title, by defeating Nissan Motors 1–0.

== Match details ==
June 26, 1983

Yanmar Diesel	1-0	Nissan Motors
? (?)

Yamanashi Prefectural Stadium

== See also ==
- 1983 JSL Cup
