= 1954 Emperor's Cup final =

1954 Emperor's Cup Final
Keio BRB	Toyo Industries
5	3
- Prefectural
- Date: May 25, 1954
- Venue: Yamanashi Prefectural Stadium, Yamanashi

1954 Emperor's Cup Final was the 34th final of the Emperor's Cup competition. The final was played at Yamanashi Prefectural Stadium in Yamanashi on May 25, 1954. Keio BRB won the championship.

== Overview ==
Keio BRB won the championship, by defeating Toyo Industries 5–3.

== Match details ==
May 25, 1954

Keio BRB	5–3	Toyo Industries
? ?' ? ?' ? ?' ? ?' ? ?'		? ?' ? ?' ? ?'

Yamanashi Prefectural Stadium

== See also ==
- 1954 Emperor's Cup
