= Shun'ichirō =

- Gender: Male

Origin
- Origin: Japanese
- Meaning: Different meanings depending on the kanji used

Shun'ichirō, Shun'ichiro or Shun'ichirou (written: 俊一郎) is a masculine Japanese given name. Notable people with the name include:

- Shunichiro Okano (岡野 俊一郎) (born 1931), Japanese footballer and manager
