= Yasuyuki Kuwahara =

Japanese footballer (1942–2017)

Yasuyuki Kuwahara 桑原 楽之
Personal information
- Full name: Yasuyuki Kuwahara
- Date of birth: December 22, 1942
- Place of birth: Hiroshima, Hiroshima, Japan
- Date of death: March 1, 2017 (aged 74)
- Place of death: Hiroshima, Hiroshima, Japan
- Height: 1.80 m (5 ft 11 in)
- Position: Forward

Youth career
- 1958–1960: Hiroshima University High School
- 1961–1964: Chuo University

Senior career*
Years	Team	Apps	(Gls)
1965–1972	Toyo Industries	94	(53)
Total		94	(53)

International career
1966–1970	Japan	12	(5)
Medal record
Chuo University
Winner	Emperor's Cup	1962
Toyo Industries
Winner	Japan Soccer League	1965
Winner	Japan Soccer League	1966
Winner	Japan Soccer League	1967
Winner	Japan Soccer League	1968
Winner	Japan Soccer League	1970
Runner-up	Japan Soccer League	1969
Winner	Emperor's Cup	1965
Winner	Emperor's Cup	1967
Winner	Emperor's Cup	1969
Runner-up	Emperor's Cup	1966
Runner-up	Emperor's Cup	1970
Representing Japan
Olympic Games
Bronze medal – third place	1968 Mexico City	Team
Asian Games
Bronze medal – third place	1966 Bangkok	Team
- * Club domestic league appearances and goals

Yasuyuki Kuwahara (桑原 楽之, Kuwahara Yasuyuki; December 22, 1942 – March 1, 2017) was a Japanese football player. He played for Japan national team.

== Club career ==
Kuwahara was born in Hiroshima on December 22, 1942. After graduating from Chuo University, he joined his local club Toyo Industries in 1965. The club won league champions 5 times (1965, 1966, 1967, 1968 and 1970). The club also won 1965, 1967 and 1969 Emperor's Cup. He retired in 1972. He played 94 games and scored 53 goals in the league.

== National team career ==
In December 1966, he was selected Japan national team for 1966 Asian Games. At this competition, on December 14, he debuted against Malaysia. In 1968, he was selected Japan for 1968 Summer Olympics in Mexico City. He played 2 matches and Japan won Bronze Medal. In 2018, this team was selected Japan Football Hall of Fame. He played 12 games and scored 5 goals for Japan until 1970.

On March 1, 2017, Kuwahara died of pneumonia in Hiroshima at the age of 74.

== Club statistics ==
Club performance			League	
Season	Club	League	Apps	Goals
Japan			League	
1965	Toyo Industries	JSL Division 1	13	7
1966	Toyo Industries	JSL Division 1	14	9
1967	Toyo Industries	JSL Division 1	13	11
1968	Toyo Industries	JSL Division 1	14	8
1969	Toyo Industries	JSL Division 1		
1970	Toyo Industries	JSL Division 1	14	9
1971	Toyo Industries	JSL Division 1		
1972	Toyo Industries	JSL Division 1		
Total			68	44

== National team statistics ==
Japan national team
Year	Apps	Goals
1966	4	2
1967	1	1
1968	2	1
1969	4	1
1970	1	0
Total	12	5
