= Kagawa (surname) =

Kagawa (written: 香川, 加川 or 賀川) is a Japanese surname. Notable people with the surname include:

- Hiroshi Kagawa (1924–2024), Japanese footballer and journalist
- Julie Kagawa (born 1982), American author
- Kiyoto Kagawa (香川 清登; 1895–1943), Imperial Japanese Navy admiral
- Kyōko Kagawa (香川 京子; born 1931), Japanese actress
- Manao Kagawa (香川 愛生; born 1993), Japanese shogi player
- Mitsuo Kagawa (賀川 光夫; 1923–2001), Japanese archaeologist
- Ryo Kagawa (加川 良; 1947–2017), Japanese folk singer
- Sachi Kagawa (香川 幸), Japanese footballer
- Shinji Kagawa (香川 真司; born 1989), Japanese footballer
- Susumu Kagawa (香川 征; 1944–2021), Japanese urologist
- Taro Kagawa (賀川 太郎; 1922–1990), Japanese footballer
- Teruyuki Kagawa (香川 照之; born 1965), Japanese actor
- Tetsuo Kagawa (香川 哲男; born 1969), Japanese astronomer
- Toyohiko Kagawa (賀川 豊彦; 1888–1960), Japanese pacifist and labor activist
- Yuki Kagawa (香川 勇気; born 1992), Japanese footballer
- Shigeko Kagawa (1911-2026), Japanese supercentenarian

== Fictional characters ==
- Miori Kagawa, a supporting character in A Star Brighter Than the Sun
- Rin Kagawa, a supporting character in When Will Ayumu Make His Move?
