= 1957 Emperor's Cup final =

1957 Emperor's Cup Final
Chudai Club	Toyo Industries
2	1
- Date: May 6, 1957
- Venue: Hiroshima Kokutaiji High School Stadium, Hiroshima

1957 Emperor's Cup Final was the 37th final of the Emperor's Cup competition. The final was played at Hiroshima Kokutaiji High School Stadium in Hiroshima on May 6, 1957. Chudai Club won the championship.

== Overview ==
Chudai Club won their 1st title, by defeating Toyo Industries 2–1.

== Match details ==
May 6, 1957

Chudai Club	2–1	Toyo Industries

Hiroshima Kokutaiji High School Stadium

== See also ==
- 1957 Emperor's Cup
