= Teizō =

- Gender: Male

Origin
- Origin: Japanese
- Meaning: Different meanings depending on the kanji used

Teizō, Teizo or Teizou (written: 禎三, 悌三 or 梯三) is a masculine Japanese given name. Notable people with the name include:

- Teiso Esaki (江崎 梯三; 1899–1957), Japanese entomologist
- Teizo Matsumura (松村 禎三; 1929–2007), Japanese composer and poet
- Teizo Takeuchi (竹内 悌三; 1908–1946), Japanese footballer
