= Kagawa =

Kagawa (香川) may refer to:

- Kagawa Prefecture (香川県), the smallest prefecture of Japan by area, located on the island of Shikoku
- Kagawa District, Kagawa (香川郡), a district in Kagawa Prefecture
- Kagawa, Kagawa (香川町), a town located in Kagawa District
- Kagawa Station (香川駅), train station in Chigasaki, Kanagawa Prefecture
- Kagawa (surname)
- 6665 Kagawa, a main-belt asteroid
