= Hiroshima Kokutaiji High School Stadium =

Football stadium in Hiroshima, Japan

- 広島国泰寺高校球場
- Location: Hiroshima, Hiroshima, Japan

Hiroshima Kokutaiji High School Stadium (広島国泰寺高校球場) is a football stadium in Hiroshima, Hiroshima, Japan.

It hosted the 1957 Emperor's Cup and final game between Chudai Club and Toyo Industries was played there on May 6, 1957.
