= Ludwich Jahn =

Indonesian footballer

Personal information
- Full name: Ludurich Eduard Jahn
- Date of birth: 9 September 1912
- Place of birth: Malang, Dutch East Indies
- Date of death: 20 August 1943 (aged 30)
- Place of death: Thong Pha Phum, Thailand
- Position: Forward

Senior career*
Years	Team	Apps	(Gls)
- Hercules Batavia

International career
1934	Dutch East Indies	2	(3)
- * Club domestic league appearances and goals

Ludurich Eduard Jahn (9 September 1912 – 20 August 1943), or commonly referred to Ludwich "Loed" Jahn, was a Dutch East Indies football player who played as a forward.

== Career ==
Jahn has represented the Dutch East Indies national team at the 1934 Far Eastern Championship Games, scoring the team's first official goal and hat-trick in a 7–1 victory against Japan. He played against China but not the Philippines and eventually earned two caps. His hat-trick in the opening match positioned among the top two scorers for the team in the tournament, along with Tan Hian Goan who also scored a hat-trick against Japan.

== Career statistics ==
=== International ===
Appearances and goals by national team and year
National team	Year	Apps	Goals
Dutch East Indies	1934	2	3
Total		2	3

Scores and results list the Dutch East Indies's goal tally first, score column indicates score after each Jahn goal.

List of international goals scored by Ludwich Jahn
No.	Date	Venue	Cap	Opponent	Score	Result	Competition
1	13 May 1934	Rizal Memorial Stadium, Manila, Philippines	1	Japan	1–0	7–1	1934 Far Eastern Championship Games
2	13 May 1934	Rizal Memorial Stadium, Manila, Philippines	1	Japan	3–1	7–1	1934 Far Eastern Championship Games
3	13 May 1934	Rizal Memorial Stadium, Manila, Philippines	1	Japan	7–1	7–1	1934 Far Eastern Championship Games

== Honours ==
Indonesia

- Far Eastern Championship Games runners-up: 1934
