= Marvin Lee =

Trinidad and Tobago footballer (1981–2003)

Personal information
- Date of birth: 22 November 1981
- Place of birth: Morvant, Trinidad and Tobago
- Date of death: 9 March 2003 (aged 21)
- Place of death: Arima, Trinidad and Tobago
- Height: 6 ft 2 in (1.88 m)
- Position: Defender

Senior career*
Years	Team	Apps	(Gls)
–2001	Defence Force		

International career
–2001	Trinidad and Tobago U20		
- * Club domestic league appearances and goals

Marvin Lee (22 November 1981 – 9 March 2003) was a Trinidadian footballer who played as a defender.

== Injury and death ==
On 20 March 2001, Lee was captaining the Trinidad and Tobago under-20 national team in a 2001 CONCACAF U-20 Tournament match against the United States, when he collided awkwardly with Landon Donovan in the fourth minute. Donovan suffered cracked ribs, but was able to return to the match. However, Lee sustained neck and spinal injuries, leaving him paralyzed from the neck down. All of his medical expenses were covered by CONCACAF president and FIFA vice-president Jack Warner.

Two years after the injury, Lee caught a cold, which ended up being fatal. He died in Arima on 9 March 2003, at the age of 21.

== Legacy ==
A few months after his injury, Lee was awarded the FIFA Presidential Award by Sepp Blatter.

The Marvin Lee Stadium in Macoya, Trinidad, is named after him.
