= Teruo Abe =

Japanese footballer

Teruo Abe 安部 輝雄
Personal information
- Full name: Teruo Abe
- Place of birth: Empire of Japan
- Position: Defender

Youth career
- Kwansei Gakuin University

Senior career*
Years	Team	Apps	(Gls)
- Kwangaku Club

International career
1934	Japan	2	(0)
- * Club domestic league appearances and goals

Teruo Abe (安部 輝雄, Abe Teruo) was a Japanese football player. He played for Japan national team.

== Club career ==
Abe played for Kwangaku Club was consisted of his alma mater Kwansei Gakuin University players and graduates. He played with many Japan national team players Yukio Goto, Hideo Sakai and so on.

== National team career ==
In May 1934, Abe was selected Japan national team for 1934 Far Eastern Championship Games in Manila. At this competition, on 13 May, he debuted against Dutch East Indies. On 15 May, he also played against Philippines. He played 2 games for Japan in 1934.

== National team statistics ==
Japan national team
Year	Apps	Goals
1934	2	0
Total	2	0
