= Masao Nozawa =

Japanese footballer

Masao Nozawa 野澤 正雄
Personal information
- Full name: Masao Nozawa
- Place of birth: Hiroshima, Empire of Japan
- Position: Midfielder

Youth career
- Tokyo Imperial University

International career
Years	Team	Apps	(Gls)
1930	Japan	2	(0)

Masao Nozawa (野澤 正雄, Nozawa Masao) was a Japanese football player. He played for Japan national team. His brother Akira Nozawa also played for Japan national team.

== National team career ==
Nozawa was born in Hiroshima Prefecture. In May 1930, when he was a Tokyo Imperial University student, he was selected Japan national team for 1930 Far Eastern Championship Games in Tokyo and Japan won the championship. At this competition, on May 25, he debuted against Philippines. On May 29, he also played against Republic of China. He played 2 games for Japan in 1930.

== National team statistics ==
Japan national team
Year	Apps	Goals
1930	2	0
Total	2	0
