= Masashi Watanabe =

Japanese footballer and manager

Masashi Watanabe 渡辺 正
Personal information
- Full name: Masashi Watanabe
- Date of birth: January 11, 1936
- Place of birth: Hiroshima, Hiroshima, Empire of Japan
- Date of death: December 7, 1995 (aged 59)
- Place of death: Chiba, Chiba, Japan
- Height: 1.70 m (5 ft 7 in)
- Position: Forward

Youth career
- 1951: Sotoku High School
- 1951–1953: Motomachi High School

College career
Years	Team	Apps	(Gls)
1958–1961	Rikkyo University		

Senior career*
Years	Team	Apps	(Gls)
1954–1958	Yawata Steel		
1962–1971	Nippon Steel	79	(19)
Total		79	(19)

International career
1958–1969	Japan	39	(12)

Managerial career
- 1969–1975: Nippon Steel
- 1980: Japan
Medal record
Nippon Steel
Runner-up	Japan Soccer League	1965
Runner-up	Japan Soccer League	1966
Winner	Emperor's Cup	1964
Runner-up	Emperor's Cup	1956
Runner-up	Emperor's Cup	1968
Runner-up	Emperor's Cup	1965
Representing Japan
Olympic Games
Bronze medal – third place	1968 Mexico City	Team
Asian Games
Bronze medal – third place	1966 Bangkok	Team
- * Club domestic league appearances and goals

Masashi Watanabe (渡辺 正, Watanabe Masashi; January 11, 1936 – December 7, 1995) was a Japanese football player and manager. He played for Japan national team. He also managed Japan national team.

== Club career ==
Watanabe was born in Hiroshima on January 11, 1936. After graduating from high school, he joined Yawata Steel (later Nippon Steel) in 1954. In 1958, he left Yawata Steel and entered Rikkyo University. After graduating from Rikkyo University, he joined Yawata Steel again in 1962. In 1965, Yawata Steel joined new league Japan Soccer League. He retired in 1971. He played 79 games and scored 19 goals in the league. He was selected Best Eleven in 1968.

== National team career ==
On December 25, 1958, when Watanabe was a Rikkyo University student, he debuted for Japan national team against Hong Kong. He played at 1964 Summer Olympics in Tokyo and 1968 Summer Olympics in Mexico City. At 1968 Summer Olympics, he played 5 games and scored 2 goals against Brazil and France. Japan also won Bronze Medal. In 2018, this team was selected Japan Football Hall of Fame. He also played at 1962 and 1966 Asian Games. He played 39 games and scored 19 goals for Japan until 1969.

== Coaching career ==
In 1969, when Watanabe played for Yawata Steel (later Nippon Steel), he became a playing manager. He managed the club until 1975. In 1979, he became an assistant coach for Japan national team under manager Yukio Shimomura. At 1980 Asian Olympic Qualifying Tournaments in April 1980, following Japan's failure to qualify for 1980 Summer Olympics, Shimomura resigned a manager. In May, Watanabe was promoted to manager as Shimomura successor. However, just before 1982 World Cup qualification in December, he suffered a subarachnoid hemorrhage and replaced to Saburo Kawabuchi.

On December 7, 1995, Watanabe died of heart failure in Chiba at the age of 59. In 2006, he was selected Japan Football Hall of Fame.

== National team statistics ==
Japan national team
Year	Apps	Goals
1958	2	1
1959	8	4
1960	1	0
1961	6	1
1962	3	0
1963	5	3
1964	1	0
1965	3	0
1966	2	1
1967	3	1
1968	2	0
1969	3	1
Total	39	12

== Awards and honors ==
- Japan Soccer League Best Eleven: 1968
- Japan Football Hall of Fame: Inducted in 2006
