= Hiroshi Kanazawa =

Japanese footballer

Hiroshi Kanazawa 金澤 宏
Personal information
- Full name: Hiroshi Kanazawa
- Place of birth: Empire of Japan
- Position: Goalkeeper

Youth career
- Kyoto Imperial University

International career
Years	Team	Apps	(Gls)
1934	Japan	2	(0)

Hiroshi Kanazawa (金澤 宏, Kanazawa Hiroshi) was a Japanese football player. He played for the Japan national team.

== National team career ==
In May 1934, when Kanazawa was a Kyoto Imperial University student, he was selected by the Japan national team for the 1934 Far Eastern Championship Games in Manila. At that competition, he debuted on May 13 against the Dutch East Indies. On May 15, he played against the Philippines. He played two games for Japan in 1934.

== National team statistics ==
Japan national team
Year	Apps	Goals
1934	2	0
Total	2	0
