= Shiro Misaki =

Japanese footballer

Shiro Misaki 三崎 四郎
Personal information
- Full name: Shiro Misaki
- Place of birth: Empire of Japan
- Position: Midfielder

Youth career
- Kwansei Gakuin University

International career
Years	Team	Apps	(Gls)
1934	Japan	3	(0)

Shiro Misaki (三崎 四郎, Misaki Shirō) was a Japanese football player. He played for Japan national team.

== National team career ==
In May 1934, when Misaki was a Kwansei Gakuin University student, he was selected Japan national team for 1934 Far Eastern Championship Games in Manila. At this competition, on May 13, he debuted against Dutch East Indies. He also played against Philippines and Republic of China. He played 3 games for Japan in 1934.

== National team statistics ==
Japan national team
Year	Apps	Goals
1934	3	0
Total	3	0
