= Anders Frisk =

Swedish football referee (born 1963)

Per Stefan Anders Frisk
- Born: 18 February 1963 (age 63); Gothenburg, Sweden
- Occupations: Insurance agent, football referee
- Spouse: Erika Larhag Frisk
- Children: 4

Anders Frisk (born 18 February 1963) is a Swedish insurance agent by trade and a former football referee. Frisk chose to go into early retirement from refereeing due to pressure from death threats made against him and his family. He is fluent in several languages including his native Swedish, English and German.

== Career ==
Frisk was born on 18 February 1963 in the Swedish city of Gothenburg, and lives in Mölndal, his hometown, where he runs a historic cinema. He began refereeing in 1978 and took charge of Swedish top-division matches for the first time in 1989. He was awarded his FIFA badge in 1991. In addition to refereeing at the highest level, Frisk also acts as an ambassador for the UEFA/International Committee of the Red Cross campaign highlighting the plight of children in war. He travelled to Sierra Leone for a first-hand view of the ICRC's work, and declared himself deeply moved by the scenes of reunited families.

In 1991, he travelled to Switzerland to take charge of matches in the UEFA European Under-16 Championship final round. He became a FIFA international referee at the age of 28, his first international match was Iceland against Turkey on 17 July 1991. A stint at the FIFA Under-17 World Championship in Japan two years later was followed by recognition at elite UEFA levels.

Picked for Euro 96 in England, Frisk refereed the 3-3 group match between Russia and the Czech Republic in Liverpool. He was forced to miss the 1998 FIFA World Cup in France in 1998 with a back injury, but recovered in time to take charge of the 1999 Confederations Cup final between Brazil and Mexico in the Estadio Azteca, Mexico City (4–3). Soon after, he was selected to officiate the Euro 2000 final between France and Italy at the Feijenoord Stadion in Rotterdam (2–1 a.e.t. with France winning on a golden goal).

After that appointment, he took charge of two matches in the 2002 World Cup in Korea and Japan: a group match between Brazil and China, and a second-round match between the Republic of Ireland and Spain. The referee for the Final, Pierluigi Collina, later wrote in his autobiography that Frisk had been the only other official that he had considered to have the credentials to receive the appointment. Later in 2004, Frisk took charge of the Champions League semi-final, second leg between Chelsea and Monaco. He also appeared at Euro 2004, refereeing the semi-final between Netherlands and hosts Portugal, and he was fourth official in the final between Greece and the host nation.

In September 2004, Frisk was forced to abandon a match he was refereeing between Roma and Dynamo Kyiv at the Stadio Olimpico in the group stage of the 2004–05 Champions League after he was hit by a coin thrown from the stands as he walked off the field at half-time. He was seen to be bleeding, and subsequently abandoned the match. UEFA eventually awarded the match to Kyiv as a 3–0 forfeit, and ordered that Roma play its remaining two home fixtures in the group stage behind closed doors.

On 12 March 2005, Frisk announced his immediate retirement, citing threats made against his family following a UEFA Champions League tie between Barcelona and Chelsea, during which he sent off Chelsea's Didier Drogba for receiving two cautions. Chelsea's manager, José Mourinho, accused Frisk of inviting Barça manager, Frank Rijkaard, into his room at half-time. UEFA charged Chelsea with inappropriate conduct following the match and Mourinho received a touchline ban for both legs of Chelsea's quarter-final against Bayern Munich.

On 19 December, 2005, Frisk was awarded FIFA's Presidential Award as "recognition for a career cut short following death threats against his family". He presided over 118 international games during his 18-year career.

== Major matches refereed ==
| Date | Match | Tournament | Ref |
|---|---|---|---|
| 4 August 1999 | Mexico vs. Brazil (4–3) | 1999 FIFA Confederations Cup Final | |
| 2 July 2000 | France vs. Italy (2–1 a.e.t. on a golden goal) | UEFA Euro 2000 Final | |

== Honours ==
- FIFA Presidential Award: 2005

Sporting positions (Sweden) Anders Frisk
| Preceded by (Thailand) Pirom Un-Prasert | 1999 FIFA Confederations Cup Final Referee | Succeeded by (United Arab Emirates) Ali Bujsaim |
| Preceded by (Italy) Pierluigi Pairetto | UEFA Euro 2000 Final Referee | Succeeded by (Germany) Markus Merk |
