= FIFA Presidential Award =

Annual FIFA football award

The FIFA Presidential Award was a FIFA association football award given annually at the FIFA World Player Gala. It was first awarded by the then President of FIFA Sepp Blatter in 2001, and has not been awarded since 2014 due to Blatter's suspension from all football activities in 2015.

== Winners ==
Year	FIFA Presidential Award	Notes
2001	(Trinidad and Tobago) Marvin Lee	Awarded to the former Trinidad and Tobago's U-20 captain who was paralysed after an injury sustained in an international for them in March 2001.
2002	(England) Parminder Nagra	Awarded for her role as Jess, in football film Bend It Like Beckham, who portrayed a Punjabi girl growing up in West London determined to play football, despite strong objections from her family. "The film deals with issues of cultural conformity and serves superbly to bring women's football into the spotlight as a game for all women of all cultures."
2003	(Iraq) The Iraqi Football Community	Awarded for the nation's energy and determination to drive forward the development of football despite the difficult situation in the country. The Iraqi Community was represented at the ceremony by Hussein Saeed^{[A]}, Bernd Stange^{[B]} and Naji Husam.^{[C]}
2004	Haiti	Awarded in recognition of Haiti and Brazil's "Match for Peace" played by the two association's national teams in Port-au-Prince on 18 August, which used football to bring together people and fight against discrimination.
2005	(Sweden) Anders Frisk	Awarded after a premature end to his career as a leading international referee in March 2005, following death threats and abuse to him and his family following a UEFA Champions League match between Chelsea and Barcelona.
2006	(Italy) Giacinto Facchetti	Awarded posthumously after he lost his fight to pancreatic cancer earlier in the year. It recognised him as one of the La Grande Inter and a founding fathers of catenaccio defending. The former Inter president was also commended for his service as a member of the FIFA Football Committee and as a FIFA coaching instructor.
2007	(Brazil) Pelé	Awarded 50 years after his international debut in recognition of outstanding services to the game and more specifically his immense contribution to football's growth in popularity and as a spectacle. Also for using his unique status as "the best player the world has ever known" to combat social injustice, poverty and discrimination. He fulfills this role as ambassadors of UNESCO and the WHO, and within UNICEF and football itself, not least through his membership of FIFA's Football Committee.
2008	Women's association football	Heather O'Reilly represented women's football and collected the award.
2009	Queen Rania of Jordan	For her commitment shown to the 1GOAL: Education for All initiative, encouraging millions of politicians, musicians, footballers and fans of football across the world to provide access to education for all.
2010	(South Africa) Desmond Tutu	
2011	(Scotland) Sir Alex Ferguson	
2012	(Germany) Franz Beckenbauer	
2013	(Belgium) Jacques Rogge	
2014	(Japan) Hiroshi Kagawa	

== Notes ==
A: President of the Iraqi Football Association at the time.
B:The German coach of the Iraq national football team at the time.
C: Iraq national football team captain at the time.
