= Motoko Ishii =

Japanese lighting designer (born 1938)

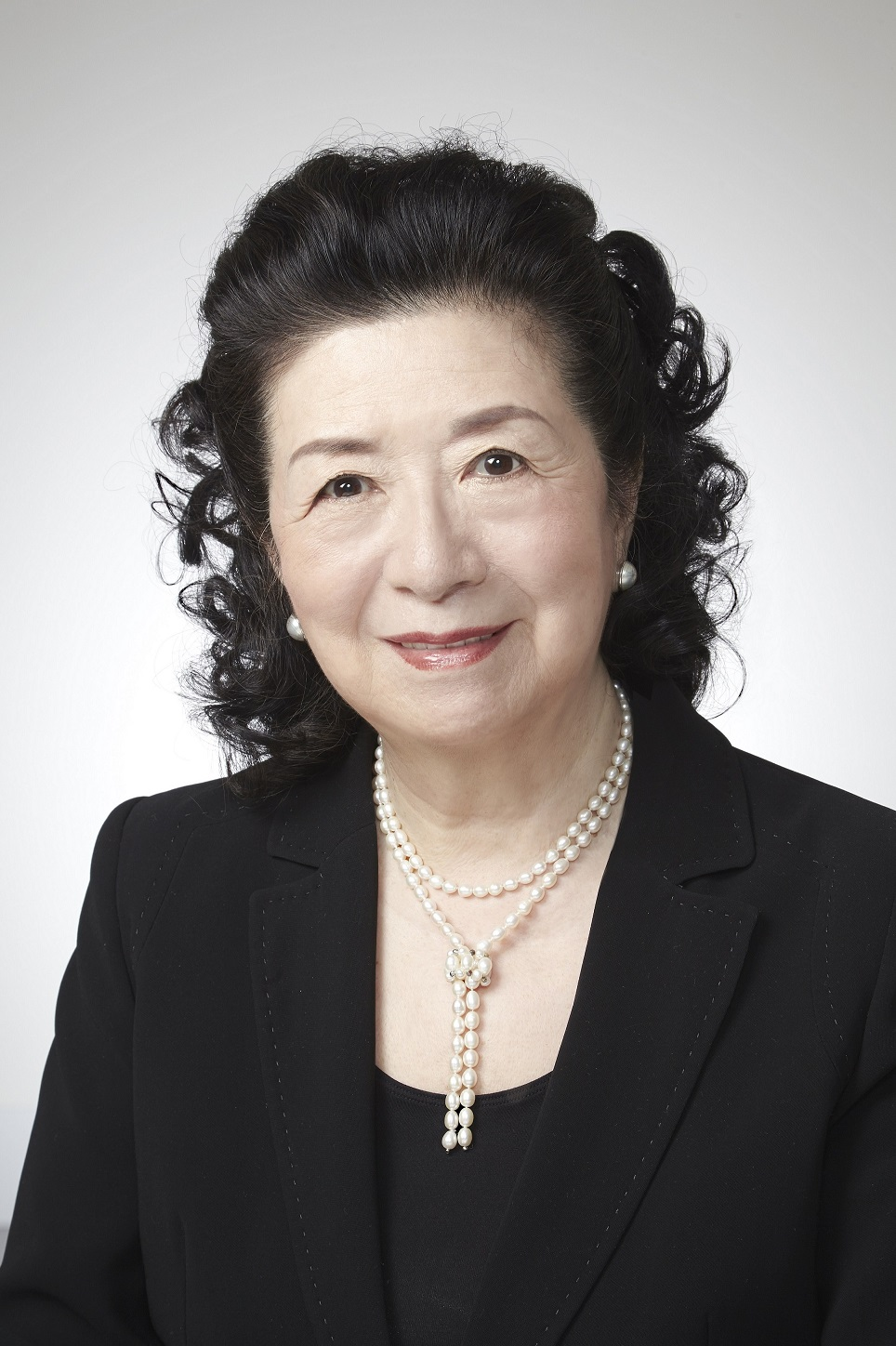
Motoko Ishii in 2015

Motoko Ishii (石井 幹子, Ishii Motoko; born October 15, 1938) is a Japanese lighting designer. From 1965 to 1967 she worked at lighting-design offices in Finland and Germany. Returning to Japan in 1968, she established the Ishii Motoko Design Office.

One of her major projects was the design for the lighting at Expo '75 in Okinawa. However, the rise in energy costs due to the energy crisis proved to be a problem.

Beginning in the 1980s, she produced the designs for a number of major projects. Three big events for which she was responsible for the lighting were Expo '85 in Tsukuba, the light-up festival of Yokohama, and Japan Flora 2000. She designed lighting for the cities of Osaka, Hakodate, Himeji and Kurashiki, and for the gasshō-zukuri village at Shirakawa.

Her 1989 redesign of the lighting for Tokyo Tower brought international attention. She won the Illuminating Engineering Society of North America Prize for the Light Fantasy Electricity Pavilion at the International Garden and Greenery Exposition (Osaka, 1990) and again for the Rainbow Bridge (1994).

Other major projects include Osaka and Himeji Castles; the Akashi Straits and the Yokohama Bay Bridges; the Heisei Building at the Tokyo National Museum; the Gifu World Fresh Water Aquarium; the station building of Tokyo Station; Roppongi Hills Mori Tower, and Ebisu Garden Place.

In 2009, she designed the lighting of Elisabeth Bridge in Budapest, Hungary. The project was financed half by the Budapest City Council and half by Japanese individuals and companies as a gift in memoriam the 140th anniversary of establishing diplomatic links between the Austro-Hungarian Monarchy and Japan, and the 50th anniversary of re-establishing diplomatic links between Japan and Hungary .

== Trivia ==
Motoko's father Teizo Takeuchi was a member of the Japan national team for the 1936 Summer Olympics football competition in Berlin.

== Honours ==
- Order of Culture (2026)
