= Kenji Onitake =

Japanese footballer

Personal information
- Date of birth: 19 September 1939 (age 87)
- Place of birth: Hiroshima, Hiroshima, Empire of Japan
- Height: 1.62 m (5 ft 4 in)
- Position: Forward

Youth career
- Hiroshima University HS
- –1962: Waseda University
- 1962–1965: Yanmar Diesel

Senior career*
Years	Team	Apps	(Gls)
1965–1967	Yanmar Diesel	28	(7)

Managerial career
- 1967–1978: Yanmar Diesel
- * Club domestic league appearances and goals

Kenji Onitake (鬼武健二, Onitake Kenji; born 19 September 1939) is a Japanese former footballer.

== Career ==
Having both played for and managed Yanmar Diesel, Onitake was one of the founding members of the club's J.League successor, Cerezo Osaka. He served as president of Cerezo Osaka from 1993 until 2004, when he was appointed vice-chairman of the J.League, a position he held until 2006, when he was made chairman.

Onitake is seen as a crucial figure in Cerezo Osaka history, helping them to promotion from the Japan Football League to the J.League.

He was inducted into the Japan Football Association hall of fame in 2015.

== Managerial statistics ==
Managerial record by team and tenure
Team	From	To	Record				
Team	From	To	P	W	D	L	Win %
Yanmar Diesel	1967	1978	192	104	40	48	54.2
Total			192	104	40	48	54.2

== Honours ==
- Japan Football Hall of Fame: Inducted in 2015
