= Chris McDonald =

Chris McDonald may refer to:

- Christopher McDonald (born 1955), American actor
- Chris McDonald (soccer) (born 1975), retired American soccer player
- Chris McDonald (politician) (born 1977), British MP and former CEO
- Chris McDonald (footballer) (born 1975), Scottish footballer

== See also ==
- Christopher McDonald (disambiguation)
