= Kofu Midorigaoka Sports Park Stadium =

Athletic stadium in Yamanashi

- 甲府市緑が丘スポーツ公園陸上競技場
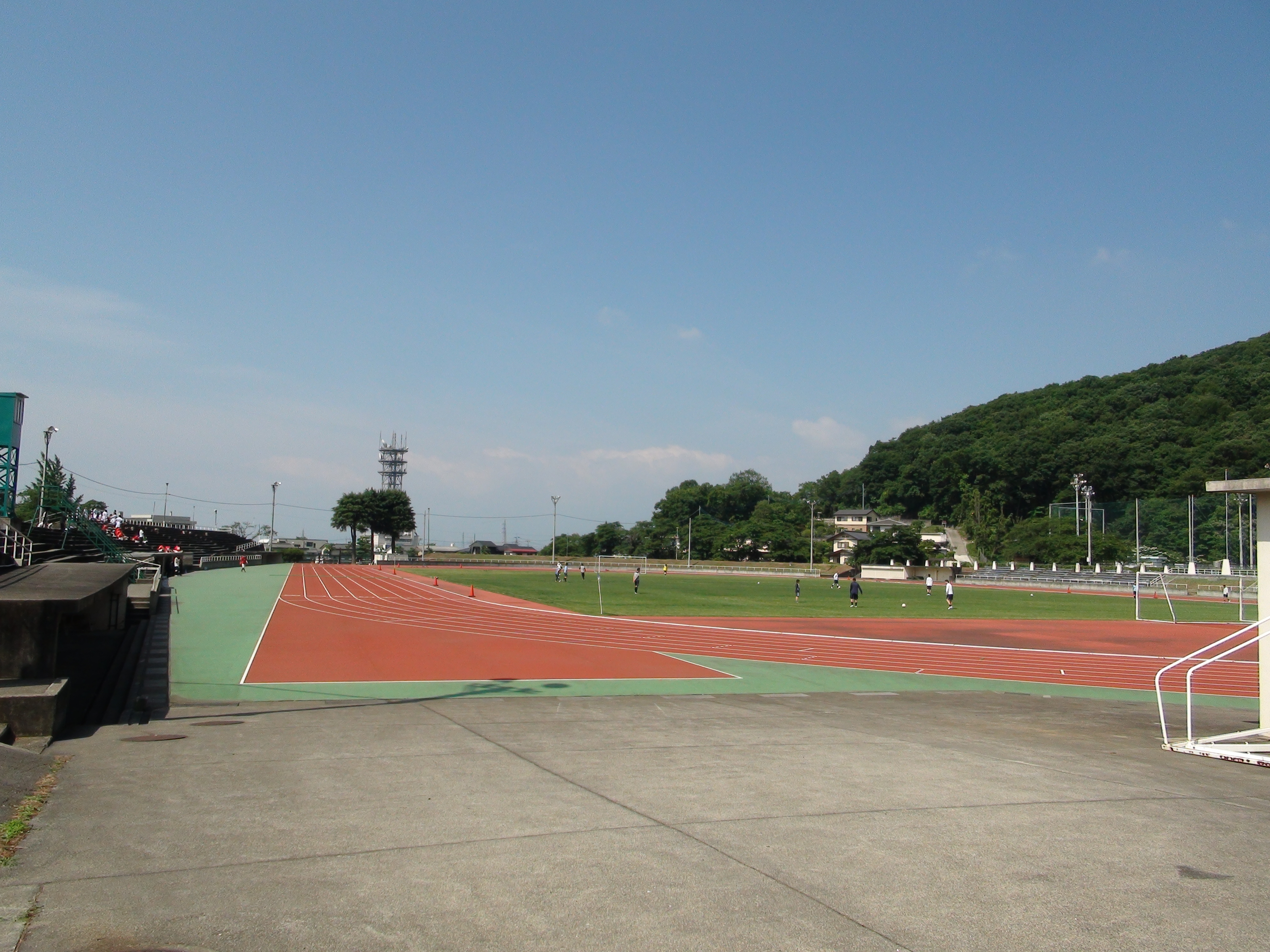
- Interactive map of Kofu Midorigaoka Sports Park Stadium
- Former names: Yamanashi Prefectural Stadium (1954-1988)
- Location: Kōfu, Yamanashi, Japan
- Coordinates: 35.6818°N 138.5577°E
- Owner: Kofu City

Website
- Official site

Kofu Midorigaoka Sports Park Stadium (甲府市緑が丘スポーツ公園陸上競技場) is an athletic stadium in Kōfu, Yamanashi, Japan.

It was formerly known as Yamanashi Prefectural Stadium until April 1988.

It hosted the 1954 Emperor's Cup, and the final game between Keio BRB and Toyo Industries was played there on May 25, 1954.
