= Yukio Tsuda (footballer) =

Japanese footballer

Yukio Tsuda 津田 幸男
Personal information
- Full name: Yukio Tsuda
- Date of birth: August 15, 1917
- Place of birth: Kobe, Hyogo, Empire of Japan
- Date of death: April 17, 1979 (aged 61)
- Place of death: Japan
- Position: Goalkeeper

Youth career
- Kobe Daiichi High School
- Keio University

Senior career*
Years	Team	Apps	(Gls)
- Keio BRB
- East Japan Heavy Industries

International career
1940–1951	Japan	4	(0)
Medal record
Keio University
Winner	Emperor's Cup	1937
Keio BRB
Winner	Emperor's Cup	1936
Winner	Emperor's Cup	1939
Winner	Emperor's Cup	1940
Winner	Emperor's Cup	1951
All Keio
Winner	Emperor's Cup	1952
Representing Japan
Asian Games
Bronze medal – third place	1951 New Delhi	Team
- * Club domestic league appearances and goals

Yukio Tsuda (津田 幸男, Tsuda Yukio; August 15, 1917 – April 17, 1979) was a Japanese football player. He played for Japan national team.

== Club career ==
Tsuda was born in Kobe on August 15, 1917. He played for Keio BRB was consisted of his alma mater Keio University players and graduates. He won 1936, 1937, 1939 and 1940 Emperor's Cup at Keio University and Keio BRB. 1940 Emperor's Cup was the last Emperor's Cup before the war because Emperor's Cup was suspended for World War II from 1941 to 1945.

After World War II, Tsuda won 1951 and 1952 Emperor's Cup as a member of Keio BRB and All Keio. He also played East Japan Heavy Industries.

== National team career ==
On June 16, 1940, when Tsuda was a Keio University student, he debuted for Japan national team against Philippines and Japan won the match. This match was the first match since 1936 Summer Olympics and the only match in the 1940s in Japan's International A Match due to World War II.

After World War II, Japan national team was resumed activities in 1951 and Tsuda was selected Japan for 1951 Asian Games. He played 4 games for Japan until 1951.

On April 17, 1979, Tsuda died of a parkinson's disease at the age of 61.

== National team statistics ==
Japan national team
Year	Apps	Goals
1940	1	0
1941	0	0
1942	0	0
1943	0	0
1944	0	0
1945	0	0
1946	0	0
1947	0	0
1948	0	0
1949	0	0
1950	0	0
1951	3	0
Total	4	0

== Honours ==
Japan

- Asian Games Bronze medal: 1951
