= Yuzuru Nozu =

Japanese footballer

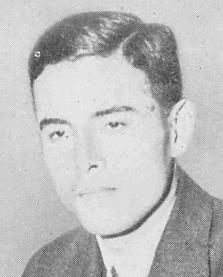

Personal information
- Date of birth: 12 March 1899
- Place of birth: Hiroshima, Hiroshima, Empire of Japan
- Date of death: 27 August 1983 (aged 84)
- Place of death: Setagaya, Tokyo, Japan

Youth career
- Hiroshima First Junior HS
- 1916–1923: Tokyo Imperial University

International career
Years	Team	Apps	(Gls)
1921	Japan	2	(0)

Yuzuru Nozu (野津謙, Nozu Yuzuru; 12 March 1899 – 27 August 1983) KBE was a Japanese footballer who made two appearances for Japan at the 1921 Far Eastern Championship Games.

== Football career ==
Having represented Japan at international level, Nozu was made president of the Japan Football Association in 1955, and helped gain the recognition of JFA as an incorporated foundation in 1974. He is seen in Japan as an influential figure in the development of Japanese football, and served on the FIFA board of directors.

He was awarded the blue ribbon Medal of Honor in 1964, the 3rd Class Order of the Sacred Treasure in 1969 and was made an honorary Knight Commander Knight Commander of the British Empire in 1970.

In 2005, he was posthumously inducted into the Japanese Football Hall of Fame.

== Medical career ==
Nozu graduated from Harvard University in 1934, and returned to Japan to help develop preventative medicine in Japan. Between 1935 and 1937, he served as head of school hygiene at the Tokyo Central Public Health Department, before being named Minister for Physical Education at the Ministry of Health, Labour, and Welfare in 1938, a position he held until 1941.

He opened the Nozu Clinic in 1947, and was director until March 1982.

== Death ==
Nozu died from heart failure in Tokyo in 1983.

== Career statistics ==
Appearances and goals by national team and year
National team	Year	Apps	Goals
Japan	1921	2	0
Total		2	0

== Honours ==
- Japan Football Hall of Fame: Inducted in 2005
