= Hideo Shinojima =

Japanese footballer

Hideo Shinojima 篠島 秀雄
Personal information
- Full name: Hideo Shinojima
- Date of birth: January 21, 1910
- Place of birth: Nikko, Tochigi, Empire of Japan
- Date of death: February 11, 1975 (aged 65)
- Place of death: Minato, Tokyo, Japan
- Position: Forward

Youth career
- 1928–1931: Tokyo Imperial University

International career
Years	Team	Apps	(Gls)
1930	Japan	2	(1)

Hideo Shinojima (篠島 秀雄, Shinojima Hideo; January 21, 1910 – February 11, 1975) was a Japanese football player.

== National team career ==
Shinojima was born in Nikko on January 21, 1910. In May 1930, when he was a Tokyo Imperial University student, he was selected Japan national team for 1930 Far Eastern Championship Games in Tokyo and Japan won the championship. At this competition, on May 25, he debuted against Philippines. On May 29, he also played and scored a goal against Republic of China. He played 2 games and scored 1 goal for Japan in 1930.

== After retirement ==
After retirement, Shinojima joined Japan Football Association (JFA). In 1965, he became vice-present of JFA. In 1975, he resigned for health reasons.

On February 11, 1975, Shinojima died of heart failure in Minato, Tokyo at the age of 65. In 2006, he was selected Japan Football Hall of Fame.

== National team statistics ==
Japan national team
Year	Apps	Goals
1930	2	1
Total	2	1

== Honours ==
- Medal with Blue Ribbon (1969)
- Grand Cordon of the Order of the Sacred Treasure (1975)
- Japan Football Hall of Fame: Inducted in 2006
