= Shunichi Kumai =

Japanese footballer

Shunichi Kumai 熊井 俊一
Personal information
- Full name: Shunichi Kumai
- Date of birth: May 13 1904
- Place of birth: Empire of Japan
- Position: Goalkeeper

Youth career
- Waseda University

International career
Years	Team	Apps	(Gls)
1934	Japan	2	(0)

Shunichi Kumai (熊井 俊一, Kumai Shunichi) was a Japanese football player. He played for Japan national team.

== National team career ==
In May 1934, when Kumai was a Waseda University student, he was selected Japan national team for 1934 Far Eastern Championship Games in Manila. At this competition, on May 13, he debuted against Dutch East Indies. On May 20, he also played against Republic of China. He played 2 games for Japan in 1934.

== National team statistics ==
Japan national team
Year	Apps	Goals
1934	2	0
Total	2	0
