= Miyagino Football Stadium =

Football stadium in Sendai, Japan

- 宮城野サッカー場
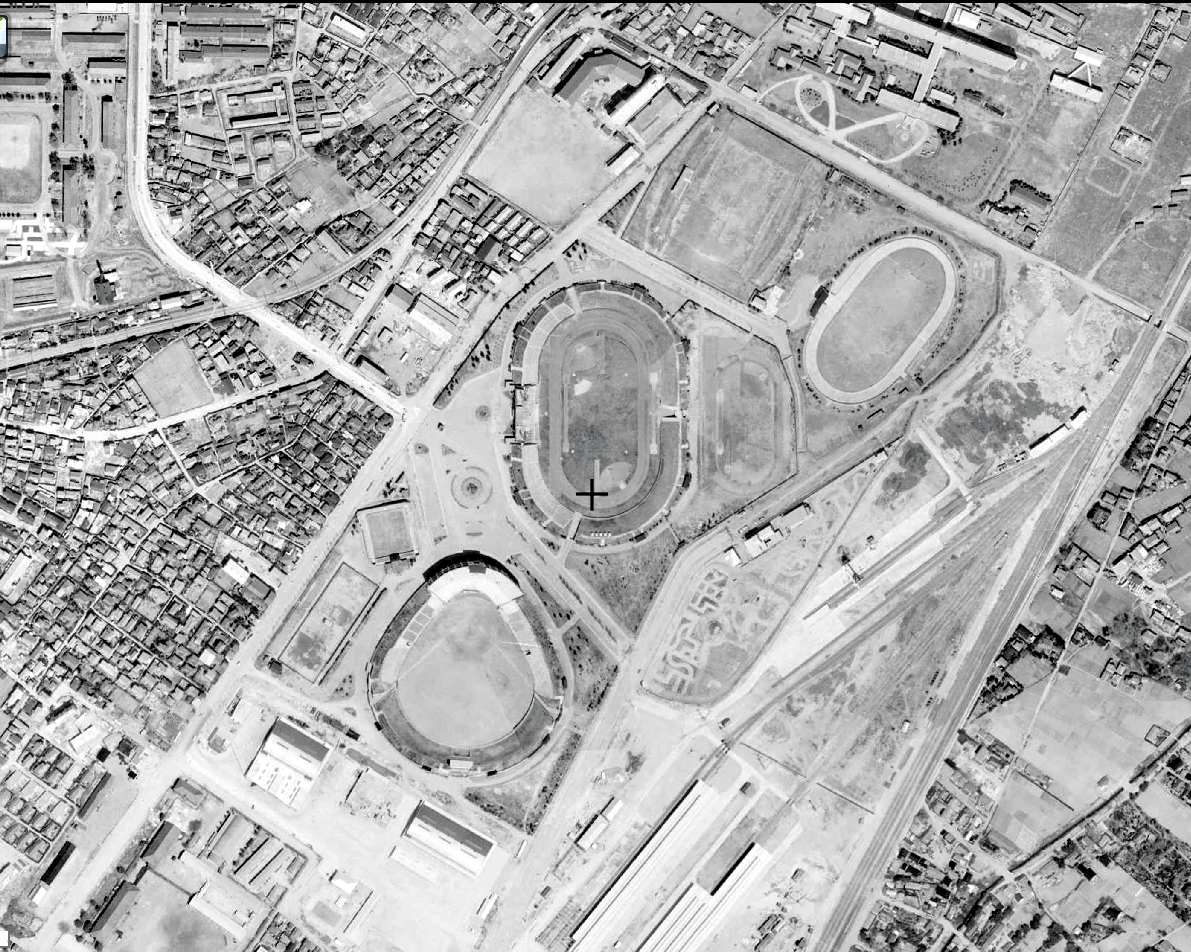
- Location: Sendai, Miyagi, Japan

Miyagino Football Stadium (宮城野サッカー場) is a football stadium in Sendai, Miyagi, Japan.

It hosted the 1951 Emperor's Cup and final game between Keio BRB and Osaka Club was played there on May 27, 1951.
