= Suwu Lontoh =

Indonesian footballer

Personal information
- Full name: Suwu Johannes Lontoh
- Date of birth: 15 June 1908
- Place of birth: Manado, Dutch East Indies
- Date of death: 4 January 1945 (aged 36)
- Place of death: Port Timor
- Position: Forward

Senior career*
Years	Team	Apps	(Gls)
- Velocitas

International career
1934	Dutch East Indies	1	(2)
- * Club domestic league appearances and goals

Suwu Johannes Lontoh (15 June 1908 – 4 January 1945) was a footballer who represented the Dutch East Indies at the 1934 Far Eastern Championship Games.

== Personal life and death ==
Born 15 June 1908 in Manado, Dutch East Indies, Lontoh served in World War II with the Royal Netherlands East Indies Army. He was captured by Japanese forces on 9 March 1942, and died on 4 January 1945.

== Career statistics ==
=== International ===
Appearances and goals by national team and year
National team	Year	Apps	Goals
Dutch East Indies	1934	1	2
Total		1	2

Scores and results list the Dutch East Indies's goal tally first, score column indicates score after each Dutch East Indies goal.

List of international goals scored by Suwo Lontoh
No.	Date	Venue	Opponent	Score	Result	Competition
1	13 May 1934	Rizal Memorial Stadium, Manila, Philippines	Philippines	?–?	1–2	1934 Far Eastern Championship Games
2	13 May 1934	Rizal Memorial Stadium, Manila, Philippines	Philippines	?–?	1–2	1934 Far Eastern Championship Games

== Honours ==
Indonesia

- Far Eastern Championship Games runners-up: 1934
