= Teizo Takeuchi =

Japanese footballer

Teizo Takeuchi 竹内 悌三
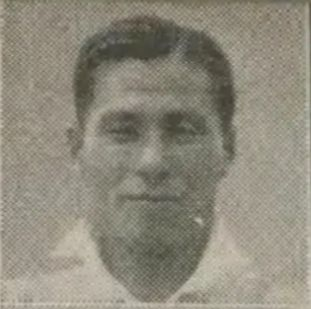
- Teizo Takeuchi, July 1936

Personal information
- Full name: Teizo Takeuchi
- Date of birth: 6 November 1908
- Place of birth: Tokyo, Empire of Japan
- Date of death: 12 April 1946 (aged 37)
- Place of death: Amur Oblast, Soviet Union
- Height: 1.70 m (5 ft 7 in)
- Position: Defender

Youth career
- 1928–1931: Tokyo Imperial University

Senior career*
| Years | Team | Apps | (Gls) |
- Tokyo Imperial University LB

International career
| 1930–1936 | Japan | 4 | (0) |
- * Club domestic league appearances and goals

Teizo Takeuchi (竹内 悌三, Takeuchi Teizō; 6 November 1908 – 12 April 1946) was a Japanese football player. He played for Japan national team. Lighting designer Motoko Ishii is his daughter.

== Club career ==
Takeuchi was born in Tokyo on 6 November 1908. He played for Tokyo Imperial University LB was consisted of his alma mater Tokyo Imperial University players and graduates.

== National team career ==

Miracle of Berlin (1936 Olympics 1st round v Sweden on 4 August)

In May 1930, when Takeuchi was a Tokyo Imperial University student, he was selected Japan national team for 1930 Far Eastern Championship Games in Tokyo and Japan won the championship. At this competition, on 25 May, he debuted against Philippines. In 1936, he was selected Japan for 1936 Summer Olympics in Berlin and he played 2 games as Japan team captain. Japan completed a come-from-behind victory first game against Sweden. The first victory in Olympics for the Japan and the historic victory over one of the powerhouses became later known as "Miracle of Berlin" (ベルリンの奇跡) in Japan. In 2016, this team was selected Japan Football Hall of Fame. He played 4 games for Japan until 1936.

== Death ==
In 1944, Takeuchi served in the military for World War II and was detained in the Soviet Union following the war (Japanese prisoners of war in the Soviet Union). On 12 April 1946, he died in a detention camp; the 20th POW camp in Siberia at the age of 37. In 2006, he was selected Japan Football Hall of Fame.

== National team statistics ==
Japan national team
| Year | Apps | Goals |
|---|---|---|
| 1930 | 2 | 0 |
| 1931 | 0 | 0 |
| 1932 | 0 | 0 |
| 1933 | 0 | 0 |
| 1934 | 0 | 0 |
| 1935 | 0 | 0 |
| 1936 | 2 | 0 |
| Total | 4 | 0 |

== Honours ==
- Japan Football Hall of Fame: Inducted in 2006
