= Gyoji Matsumoto =

Japanese footballer and coach (1934–2019)

Gyoji Matsumoto 松本 暁司
Personal information
- Full name: Gyoji Matsumoto
- Date of birth: August 13, 1934
- Place of birth: Saitama, Saitama, Empire of Japan
- Date of death: September 2, 2019 (aged 85)
- Place of death: Saitama, Saitama, Japan
- Position: Goalkeeper

Youth career
- Urawa High School
- Saitama University

Senior career*
Years	Team	Apps	(Gls)
- Urawa Club

International career
1958	Japan	1	(0)
- * Club domestic league appearances and goals

Gyoji Matsumoto (松本 暁司, Matsumoto Gyōji; August 13, 1934 – September 2, 2019) was a Japanese footballer who played for the national team. He later became a coach.

== Club career ==
Matsumoto was born in Saitama on August 13, 1934. After graduating from Saitama University, he played for his local club Urawa Club (ja).

== International career ==
On December 28, 1958, he debuted for Japan national team against Malaya.

== Coaching career ==
After the retirement, Matsumoto managed for Saitama Urawa Minami High School (ja). In 1969, Urawa Minami High School became the first high school to achieve the "treble", by winning all three major titles: All Japan High School Soccer Tournament, Inter-High School Championships (ja), and National Sports Festival of Japan in the same year. He also instructed later international players, Kozo Tashima and so on.

On September 2, 2019, he died of heart disease in Saitama at the age of 85.

== National team statistics ==
Japan national team
Year	Apps	Goals
1958	1	0
Total	1	0
