= Takeshi Natori =

Japanese footballer

Takeshi Natori 名取 武
Personal information
- Full name: Takeshi Natori
- Place of birth: Empire of Japan
- Position: Forward

Youth career
- Waseda University

International career
Years	Team	Apps	(Gls)
1934	Japan	1	(1)

Takeshi Natori (名取 武, Natori Takeshi) was a Japanese football player. He played for Japan national team.

== National team career ==
In May 1934, when Natori was a Waseda University student, he was selected Japan national team for 1934 Far Eastern Championship Games in Manila. At this competition, on May 20, he debuted and scored a goal against Republic of China.

== National team statistics ==
Japan national team
Year	Apps	Goals
1934	1	1
Total	1	1
