= Taro Kagawa =

Japanese footballer (1922–1990)

Taro Kagawa 賀川 太郎
Personal information
- Full name: Taro Kagawa
- Date of birth: August 9, 1922
- Place of birth: Kobe, Hyogo, Empire of Japan
- Date of death: March 6, 1990 (aged 67)
- Place of death: Japan
- Position: Forward

Youth career
- Kobe Daiichi High School
- Kobe University of Economics

Senior career*
Years	Team	Apps	(Gls)
1948–?	Tanabe Pharmaceutical		
- Osaka SC

International career
1951–1954	Japan	5	(0)
Medal record
Representing Japan
Asian Games
Bronze medal – third place	1951 New Delhi	Team
- * Club domestic league appearances and goals

Taro Kagawa (賀川 太郎, Kagawa Tarō; August 9, 1922 – March 6, 1990) was a Japanese football player. He played for Japan's national team. His brother was journalist and former footballer Hiroshi Kagawa.

== Club career ==
Kagawa was born in Kobe on August 9, 1922. After graduating from Kobe University of Economics, he joined Tanabe Pharmaceutical in 1948. He also played for Osaka SC. At Osaka SC, he won the 2nd place at Emperor's Cup 3 times (1951, 1952 and 1953).

== National team career ==
In March 1951, Kagawa was selected to the Japan national team for Japan's first game after World War II, at the 1951 Asian Games. At this competition, on March 7, he debuted against Iran. He also played at the 1954 Asian Games. He played 5 games for Japan until 1954.

Kagawa died on March 6, 1990, at the age of 67. In 2006, he was selected to the Japan Football Hall of Fame.

== National team statistics ==
Japan national team
Year	Apps	Goals
1951	2	0
1954	3	0
Total	5	0

== Honours ==
Japan

- Asian Games Bronze medal: 1951

Individual

- Japan Football Hall of Fame: Inducted in 2006
