= Cao Guicheng =

Chinese footballer (1911–1953)

Personal information
- Date of birth: 15 June 1911
- Place of birth: Hong Kong
- Date of death: 21 October 1953 (aged 42)

International career
Years	Team	Apps	(Gls)
1927–1936	China	7	(0)

Cao Guicheng (15 June 1911 – 21 October 1953) was a Chinese footballer. He competed in the men's tournament at the 1936 Summer Olympics.
