= Toshio Iwatani =

Japanese footballer

Toshio Iwatani 岩谷 俊夫
Personal information
- Full name: Toshio Iwatani
- Date of birth: October 24, 1925
- Place of birth: Kobe, Hyogo, Empire of Japan
- Date of death: March 1, 1970 (aged 44)
- Place of death: Chuo, Tokyo, Japan
- Position: Forward

Youth career
- Kobe Daiichi High School
- 1943–1947: Waseda University

Senior career*
| Years | Team | Apps | (Gls) |
- Osaka SC

International career
| 1951–1956 | Japan | 8 | (4) |
Medal record
Representing Japan
Asian Games
| Bronze medal – third place | 1951 New Delhi | Team |
- * Club domestic league appearances and goals

Toshio Iwatani (岩谷 俊夫, Iwatani Toshio; October 24, 1925 – March 1, 1970) was a Japanese football player. He played for Japan national team.

== Club career ==
Iwatani was born in Kobe on October 24, 1925. After graduating from Waseda University, he played for Osaka SC. Osaka SC won second place at the Emperor's Cup three times, in 1951, 1952, and in 1953.

== National team career ==
In March 1951, Iwatani was selected by the Japan national team for its first game after World War II, the 1951 Asian Games. He debuted at this competition on March 7 against Iran. On March 9, he scored two goals against Afghanistan during the match for third place and Japan won 2-0. He also played in the 1954 Asian Games. He played as captain in June 1956 at the 1956 Summer Olympics qualification against South Korea. Japan finished with one win and one defeat. After the qualifiers, the team drew lots for captain, and he was selected. The team won the qualification for the 1956 Summer Olympics. However, in November, he was not selected by the Japan team for the Olympics. He played eight games and scored four goals for Japan until 1956.

== Death ==
On March 1, 1970, Iwatani died of a brain tumor in Chuo, Tokyo at the age of 44. In 2006, he was inducted into the Japan Football Hall of Fame.

== National team statistics ==
Japan national team
| Year | Apps | Goals |
|---|---|---|
| 1951 | 3 | 2 |
| 1952 | 0 | 0 |
| 1953 | 0 | 0 |
| 1954 | 2 | 2 |
| 1955 | 2 | 0 |
| 1956 | 1 | 0 |
| Total | 8 | 4 |

== Honours ==
Japan

- Asian Games Bronze medal: 1951
- Japan Football Hall of Fame: Inducted in 2006
