= The Hong Djien =

Indonesian footballer

Personal information
- Full name: The Hong Djien
- Date of birth: 28 May 1911 or 12 January 1916
- Place of birth: Soerabaja, Dutch East Indies
- Date of death: 18 February 1985
- Place of death: Venlo, Netherlands
- Position: Forward

Senior career*
Years	Team	Apps	(Gls)
- Tiong Hoa Soerabaja

International career
1934–1938	Dutch East Indies	5	(1)
- * Club domestic league appearances and goals

The Hong Djien (born 28 May 1911 or 12 January 1916), also known as Tan Hong Djien, was an Indonesian footballer of Chinese descent who played as forward for the Dutch East Indies in the 1934 Far Eastern Games and the 1938 FIFA World Cup. He also played for Tiong Hoa Soerabaja.

Djien was scouted by several major clubs, including Santos and Barcelona, during the 1938 World Cup, but he chose to stay in his native Indonesia to run the local farm his family owned.

== Early life ==
The Hong Djien was born on 28 May 1911 or 12 January 1916, in Soerabaja, Dutch East Indies. He started playing football since 1924 as goalkeeper and then from 1928 as left-back. Later, he played as forward since 1934.

Apart from football, he also played athletics and swimming sports.

== Personal life ==
He died on 18 February 1985 in Venlo, Netherlands at the age of 73 or 69.

== International goals ==
No.	Date	Venue	Opponent	Score	Result	Competition
1.	13 May 1934	Rizal Memorial Stadium, Manila, Philippines	Japan	2–0	7–1	1934 Far Eastern Games
