= Ichiji Otani =

Japanese footballer

Ichiji Otani 大谷 一二
Personal information
- Full name: Ichiji Otani
- Date of birth: August 31, 1912
- Place of birth: Hyogo, Empire of Japan
- Date of death: November 23, 2007 (aged 95)
- Place of death: Japan
- Position: Forward

Youth career
- ????–1936: Kobe University of Commerce

International career
| Years | Team | Apps | (Gls) |
| 1934 | Japan | 3 | (1) |

Ichiji Otani (大谷 一二, Otani Ichiji; August 31, 1912 – November 23, 2007) was a Japanese football player. He played for Japan national team.

== National team career ==
Otani was born in Hyogo Prefecture on August 31, 1912. In May 1934, when he was a Kobe University of Commerce student, he was selected Japan national team for 1934 Far Eastern Championship Games in Manila. At this competition, on May 13, he debuted against Dutch East Indies. He also played against Philippines and Republic of China. He played 3 games and scored 1 goal for Japan in 1934.

== After retirement ==
After graduation from Kobe University of Commerce, Otani retired from playing career and he joined Toyo Boseki. He served as president from 1974 to 1978 and chairman from 1978 to 1983.

On November 23, 2007, Otani died of senility at the age of 95.

== National team statistics ==
Japan national team
| Year | Apps | Goals |
|---|---|---|
| 1934 | 3 | 1 |
| Total | 3 | 1 |
