= Christopher W. McDonald =

English footballer and businessman

Christopher W McDonald
Personal information
- Full name: Christopher William McDonald
- Date of birth: 13 December 1931
- Place of birth: London, England
- Date of death: 2 December 2011 (aged 79)
- Place of death: Bunkyō, Tokyo, Japan
- Positions: Goalkeeper; forward

Senior career*
Years	Team	Apps	(Gls)
- YC & AC
1955–1956	Tokyo Club		
- TRICK Club
- * Club domestic league appearances and goals

Christopher William McDonald OBE (13 December 1931 – 2 December 2011) was an English footballer and businessman who served a prominent role as a link between FIFA and the JFA. He played mainly as a goalkeeper, and occasionally as a forward.

== Career ==
McDonald moved to Japan in April 1950, where he worked for the NCR Corporation's Japanese branch. He became a director at Rolex Japan in 1980, the company he would later become president and chairman of. He worked as an adviser to the JFA from 1992, and was a member of the J-League Consultative and Mediatory Committee from 1993 until 2008.

McDonald played football as a child in his home country of England, and joined the Yokohama Country & Athletic Club soon after his arrival in Japan in 1950. He also played for Tokyo Club and TRICK Club, the latter of which he represented at the National Inter-City Tournament. He served as a liaison to FIFA president Sir Stanley Rous during the 1958 Asian Games and 1964 Summer Olympics, where he helped act as an intermediary between FIFA and the JFA. He also served as adviser to the Football Association of Japan, was on the World Cup Committee and was the representative in Japan of the New Zealand Football Association. During the 1960s and 70s, McDonald helped to secure numerous tours of Japan for English football clubs, including Middlesex Wanderers, Arsenal, Manchester City and Tottenham Hotspur.

He was honoured with an Order of the British Empire in 1978, for contributions to Anglo-Japanese relations, and to the British community in Japan, as well as the Order of the Rising Sun, Gold Rays with Rosette in 2009.

He was inducted into the Japan Football Hall of Fame in 2011, shortly before his death.

== Death ==
McDonald died as a result of pneumonia in Tokyo in 2011.
