= Akira Nozawa =

Japanese footballer

Akira Nozawa 野澤 晁
Personal information
- Full name: Akira Nozawa
- Date of birth: August 15, 1914
- Place of birth: Hiroshima, Empire of Japan
- Date of death: May 13, 2000 (aged 85)
- Position: Forward

Youth career
- Waseda University

International career
Years	Team	Apps	(Gls)
1934	Japan	3	(3)

Akira Nozawa (野澤 晁, Nozawa Akira) was a Japanese football player. He played for Japan national team. His brother Masao Nozawa also played for Japan national team.

== National team career ==
Nozawa was born in Hiroshima Prefecture. In May 1934, when he was a Waseda University student, he was selected Japan national team for 1934 Far Eastern Championship Games in Manila. At this competition, on May 13, he debuted against Dutch East Indies. He also played against Philippines and Republic of China. He played 3 games and scored 3 goals for Japan in 1934.

== National team statistics ==
Japan national team
Year	Apps	Goals
1934	3	3
Total	3	3
