= Tio Hian Goan =

Indonesian-Chinese footballer

Personal information
- Date of birth: 1911
- Place of birth: Surabaya, Dutch East Indies
- Position: Forward

Senior career*
Years	Team	Apps	(Gls)
- Tiong Hoa Soerabaja
- South China

International career
1934	Dutch East Indies	3	(3)
1936	China	1	(0)
- * Club domestic league appearances and goals

Tio Hian Goan (Chinese: 陳煒軒; 1911 – unknown) was a footballer who represented the Dutch East Indies at the 1934 Far Eastern Championship Games. He was also in the China national football team in 1936, playing one game in a friendly tournament against Portugal. He was called up for the 1936 Summer Olympics, but did not feature.

== Career statistics ==
=== International ===
Appearances and goals by national team and year
National team	Year	Apps	Goals
Dutch East Indies	1934	3	3
Dutch East Indies	Total	3	3
China	1936	1	0
China	Total	1	0
Career total		4	3

Scores and results list the Dutch East Indies's goal tally first, score column indicates score after each Tio H. G. goal.

List of international goals scored by Tio Hian Goan
No.	Date	Venue	Cap	Opponent	Score	Result	Competition
1	13 May 1934	Rizal Memorial Stadium, Manila, Philippines	1	Japan	3–0	7–1	1934 Far Eastern Championship Games
2	13 May 1934	Rizal Memorial Stadium, Manila, Philippines	1	Japan	5–1	7–1	1934 Far Eastern Championship Games
3	13 May 1934	Rizal Memorial Stadium, Manila, Philippines	1	Japan	6–1	7–1	1934 Far Eastern Championship Games

== Honours ==
Indonesia

- Far Eastern Championship Games runners-up: 1934
