= Taizo Kawamoto =

Japanese footballer and manager

Taizo Kawamoto 川本 泰三
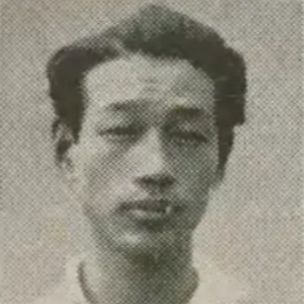
- Taizo Kawamoto, July 1936

Personal information
- Full name: Taizo Kawamoto
- Date of birth: January 17, 1914
- Place of birth: Seto, Aichi, Empire of Japan
- Date of death: September 20, 1985 (aged 71)
- Place of death: Osaka, Osaka, Japan
- Height: 1.72 m (5 ft 7 1/2 in)
- Position: Forward

Youth career
- 1926–1930: Ichioka High School
- 1931–1937: Waseda University

Senior career*
Years	Team	Apps	(Gls)
- Waseda WMW
- Osaka SC

International career
1934–1954	Japan	9	(4)

Managerial career
- 1958: Japan
- * Club domestic league appearances and goals

Taizo Kawamoto (川本 泰三, Kawamoto Taizō; January 17, 1914 – September 20, 1985) was a Japanese football player and manager. He played for and later managed the Japan national team.

== Club career ==
Kawamoto was born in Seto on January 17, 1914. He played for Waseda WMW, which consisted of players and graduates of his alma mater. The club won second place at the 1940 Emperor's Cup.

In 1941, Kawamoto served in the military during World War II and was detained in the Soviet Union following the war for four years (see Japanese prisoners of war in the Soviet Union). In December 1949, he returned to Japan when he was 35 years old, and became a player at Osaka SC. Osaka SC won second place at the Emperor's Cup three times, in 1951, 1952, and 1953.

== National team career ==

Miracle of Berlin (1936 Olympics 1st round v Sweden on August 4)

In May 1934, when Kawamoto was a Waseda University student, he was selected Japan national team for 1934 Far Eastern Championship Games in Manila. At this competition, on May 13, he debuted and scored a goal against Dutch East Indies. In 1936, he was selected Japan for 1936 Summer Olympics in Berlin and scored a goal against Sweden. Japan completed a come-from-behind victory against Sweden. The first victory in Olympics for the Japan and the historic victory over one of the powerhouses became later known as "Miracle of Berlin" (ベルリンの奇跡) in Japan. In 2016, this team was selected Japan Football Hall of Fame.

After World War II, Kawamoto played at 1954 FIFA World Cup qualification and 1954 Asian Games. He was also a member of Japan as player and assistant coach for 1956 Summer Olympics, but he did not compete. He played 9 games and scored 4 goals for Japan until 1954. On May 3, 1954, he made history by becoming the oldest player to play for Japan national team at the age of 40 years and 106 days.

== Coaching career ==
In 1956, Kawamoto served as assistant coach under manager Shigemaru Takenokoshi for 1956 Summer Olympics. In 1958, Kawamoto named a manager for Japan national team as Hidetoki Takahashi successor for 1958 Asian Games in Tokyo. At the 1958 Asian Games, Japan competed against the Philippines and Hong Kong. However, Japan lost both games and he resigned after the competition.

On September 20, 1985, Kawamoto died of stomach cancer in Osaka at the age of 71. In 2005, he was posthumously selected for the Japan Football Hall of Fame.

== National team statistics ==
Japan national team
Year	Apps	Goals
1934	3	2
1935	0	0
1936	2	1
1937	0	0
1938	0	0
1939	0	0
1940	1	1
1941	0	0
1942	0	0
1943	0	0
1944	0	0
1945	0	0
1946	0	0
1947	0	0
1948	0	0
1949	0	0
1950	0	0
1951	0	0
1952	0	0
1953	0	0
1954	3	0
Total	9	4

=== National team goals ===
#	Date	Venue	Opponent	Score	Result	Competition
1.	13 May 1934	Rizal Memorial Stadium, Manila, Philippines	Dutch East Indies	1–7	Lost	1934 Far Eastern Championship Games
2.	15 May 1934	Rizal Memorial Stadium, Manila, Philippines	Philippines	4–3	Won	1934 Far Eastern Championship Games
3.	4 August 1936	Hertha-BSC-Platz, Berlin, Germany	Sweden	3–2	Won	1936 Summer Olympics
4.	16 June 1940	Koshien South Ground, Nishinomiya, Japan	Philippines	1–0	Won	2600th National Foundation Festival

== Honours ==
- Japan Football Hall of Fame: Inducted in 2005
