= Shunichiro Okano =

Japanese footballer and manager (1931–2017)

Shunichiro Okano 岡野 俊一郎
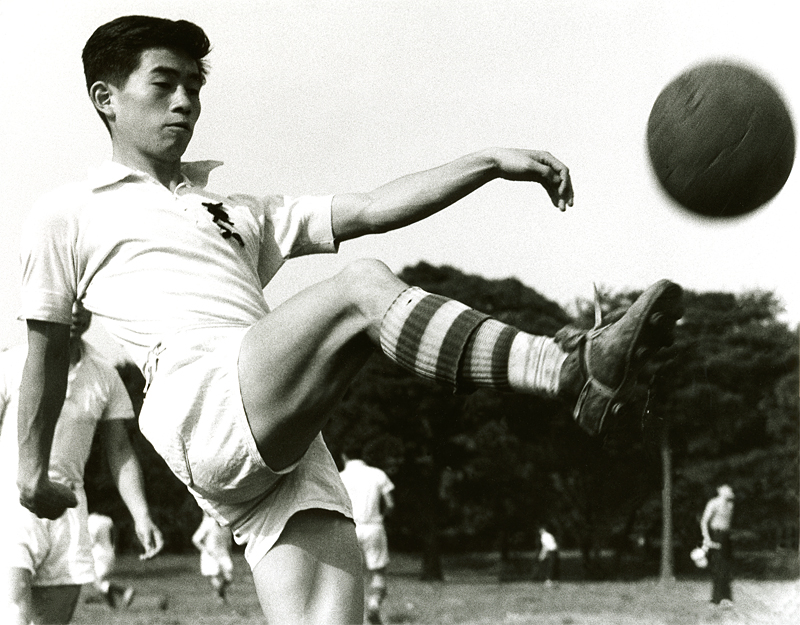
- Okano in 1953

Personal information
- Full name: Shunichiro Okano
- Date of birth: 28 August 1931
- Place of birth: Taito, Tokyo, Empire of Japan
- Date of death: 2 February 2017 (aged 85)
- Place of death: Tokyo, Japan
- Position: Forward

Youth career
- 1947–1949: Koishikawa Secondary Education School

College career
Years	Team	Apps	(Gls)
1950–1957	University of Tokyo		

International career
1955	Japan	2	(0)

Managerial career
- 1961: Japan U-20
- 1970–1971: Japan

Shunichiro Okano (岡野 俊一郎, Okano Shunichiro; 28 August 1931 – 2 February 2017) was a Japanese footballer and manager. He played for the Japan national team as a forward. He also managed Japan's national team.

== Biography ==
Okano was born in Taito, Tokyo, on 28 August 1931. His parents ran a well-established confectionery shop in Tokyo’s Ueno district. During World War II, his family escaped from the American air raids to Gunma Prefecture, but Okano stayed to attend high school.

== Playing career ==
In April 1949, Okano enrolled to the University of Tokyo, and joined a football club there. In 1953, his team won the first national university championships. In 1955, he was selected to represent the Japan national team. He played 2 games for Japan in 1955.

== Coaching career ==
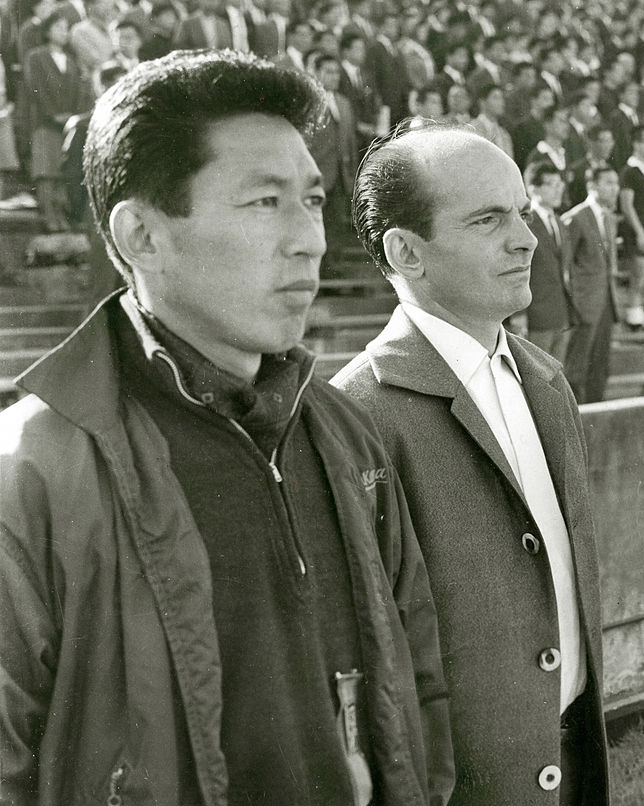
Manager Ken Naganuma (left) and coach Dettmar Cramer (right)

In March 1957, Okano graduated in psychology from the Faculty of Letters, and in early 1961, spent three months in West Germany to train as a football coach. During that time he also served as an interpreter for German coach Dettmar Cramer. Upon his return to Japan, he was appointed as manager of the Japan U-20 national team in 1961. Three years later, he led Japan at the 1964 Summer Olympics, and was an assistant for them during the 1968 Summer Olympics, where they won bronze medals. (The achievement eventually led to the team being selected to the Japan Football Hall of Fame in 2018).

In 1970, Okano was promoted to the senior Japan national team to succeed manager Ken Naganuma. He managed at the 1970 Asian Games. However, at the 1972 Summer Olympics qualification in 1971, following Japan's failure to qualify for the 1972 Summer Olympics, Okano resigned.

== Management career ==
In October 1974, Okano joined the Japan Football Association (JFA). Soon after that he became executive director of the Japanese Olympic Committee (JOC); in 1977 he was appointed as its general secretary and in 1989, as its executive director. In September 1990, he became a member of the International Olympic Committee (IOC), serving in the role until 2012. In 1995, Okano was named to the FIFA Olympic Tournaments' Organizing Committee. He also served as the 9th president of JFA (1998–2002) and 1st president of the East Asian Football Federation (2004–2006).

In 2005, Okano was selected to the Japan Football Hall of Fame. Okano died from lung cancer on 2 February 2017, at a Tokyo hospital. He was 85.

== National team statistics ==
Japan national team
Year	Apps	Goals
1955	2	0
Total	2	0

== Honour ==
- Blue Ribbon Medal of Honour (1990)
- IOC Silver Pin (1998)
- Blue Dragon Award (South Korea) (2003)
- The Order of the Rising Sun, Gold Rays with Neck Ribbon (2004)
- Japan Football Hall of Fame (2005)
- Honorary member of the International Olympic Committee (2012 - 2017)
