= 1957 Emperor's Cup =

Tournament details
- Country: Japan

Final positions
- Champions: Chuo University Club
- Runners-up: Toyo Industries
- Semifinalists: Kwangaku Club; All Rikkyo

Statistics of Emperor's Cup in the 1957 season.

== Overview ==
It was contested by 16 teams, and Chuo University Club won the championship.

== Results ==
=== 1st Round ===
- Shida Soccer 0–5 Keio BRB
- Toyama Club 0–6 Kwangaku Club
- Meiyu Club 1–1 (lottery) Kwangaku Club
- Hiroshima Exclusive 0–2 Chuo University Club
- All Hokkaido 0–7 All Waseda University
- Kyoto Shiko 0–3 Toyo Industries
- Tohoku Gakuin University 0–4 Yawata Steel
- Tomioka Soccer 1–1 All Rikkyo

=== Quarterfinals ===
- Keio BRB 1–3 Kwangaku Club
- Kwangaku Club 1–2 Chuo University Club
- All Waseda University 1–2 Toyo Industries
- Yawata Steel 0–1 All Rikkyo

=== Semifinals ===
- Kwangaku Club 0–0 (lottery) Chuo University Club
- Toyo Industries 1–0 All Rikkyo

=== Final ===
- Chuo University Club 2–1 Toyo Industries

Chuo University Club won the championship.
