= 1962 Emperor's Cup =

Tournament details
- Country: Japan
- Teams: 16

Final positions
- Champions: Chuo University
- Runners-up: Furukawa Electric
- Semifinalists: Toyo Industries; Yawata Steel

Tournament statistics
- Matches played: 15
- Goals scored: 63 (4.2 per match)

Statistics of Emperor's Cup in the 1962 season.

== Overview ==
It was contested by 16 teams, and Chuo University won the cup.

== Results ==
=== 1st Round ===
- Shida Soccer 2–3 Osaka Soccer
- Hokuyo Mokuzai Club 0–7 Chuo University
- Waseda University 5–1 Kyoto Shiko
- Toyo Industries 2–0 All Mitsubishi
- Kwansei Gakuin University 10–0 Toyama Soccer
- Furukawa Electric 5–0 Tohoku Gakuin University
- Yawata Steel 2–1 Kansai University
- Meiji University 5–1 Teijin Matsuyama

=== Quarter-finals ===
- Osaka Soccer 0–2 Chuo University
- Waseda University 0–1 Toyo Industries
- Kwansei Gakuin University 0–1 Furukawa Electric
- Yawata Steel 4–2 Meiji University

=== Semi-finals ===
- Chuo University 1–0 Toyo Industries
- Furukawa Electric 3–2 Yawata Steel

=== Final ===
- Chuo University 2–1 Furukawa Electric

Chuo University won the cup.
