= 1954 Emperor's Cup =

Tournament details
- Country: Japan

Final positions
- Champions: Keio BRB
- Runners-up: Toyo Industries
- Semifinalists: All Kansai University; Kwangaku Club

Statistics of Emperor's Cup in the 1954 season.

== Overview ==
It was contested by 16 teams, and Keio BRB won the championship.

== Results ==
=== 1st Round ===
- Tohoku Gakuin University 2–1 Osaka Club
- Keio BRB 3–0 Kagoshima University
- All Rikkyo 9–1 Takamatsu Commercial Club
- All Kansai University 5–0 Toyama Soccer
- Zenkyodai 3–0 Kyoto University of the Arts
- Kwangaku Club 9–0 Sapporo Shukyu Club
- Toyo Industries 4–0 All Yamanashi
- Chuo University Club 1–1 (lottery) Nippon Light Metal

=== Quarterfinals ===
- Tohoku Gakuin University 1–3 Keio BRB
- All Rikkyo 0–0 (lottery) All Kansai University
- Zenkyodai 1–5 Kwangaku Club
- Toyo Industries 3–1 Nippon Light Metal

=== Semifinals ===
- Keio BRB 1–0 All Kansai University
- Kwangaku Club 1–3 Toyo Industries

=== Final ===
- Keio BRB 5–3 Toyo Industries

Keio BRB won the championship.
