= Japan Football Hall of Fame =

Hall of Fame in Japan

Coordinates: 35°42′15″N 139°45′50″E

Japan Football Hall of Fame (日本サッカー殿堂) is housed at the Japan Football Museum, in JFA House in Bunkyo, Tokyo. The Hall aims to celebrate the achievements of the all-time top Japanese football players, managers, and other persons who have been significant figures in the history of the game in Japan.

== Hall of Fame ==
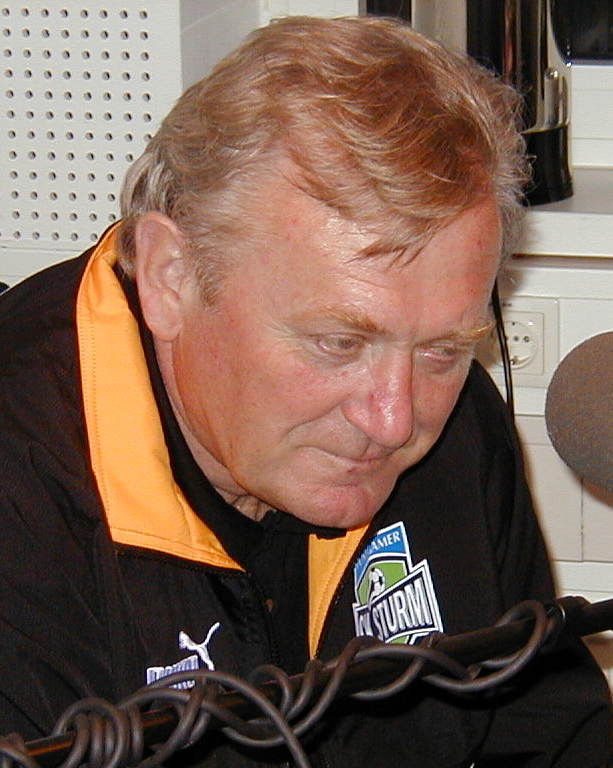
Ivica Osim

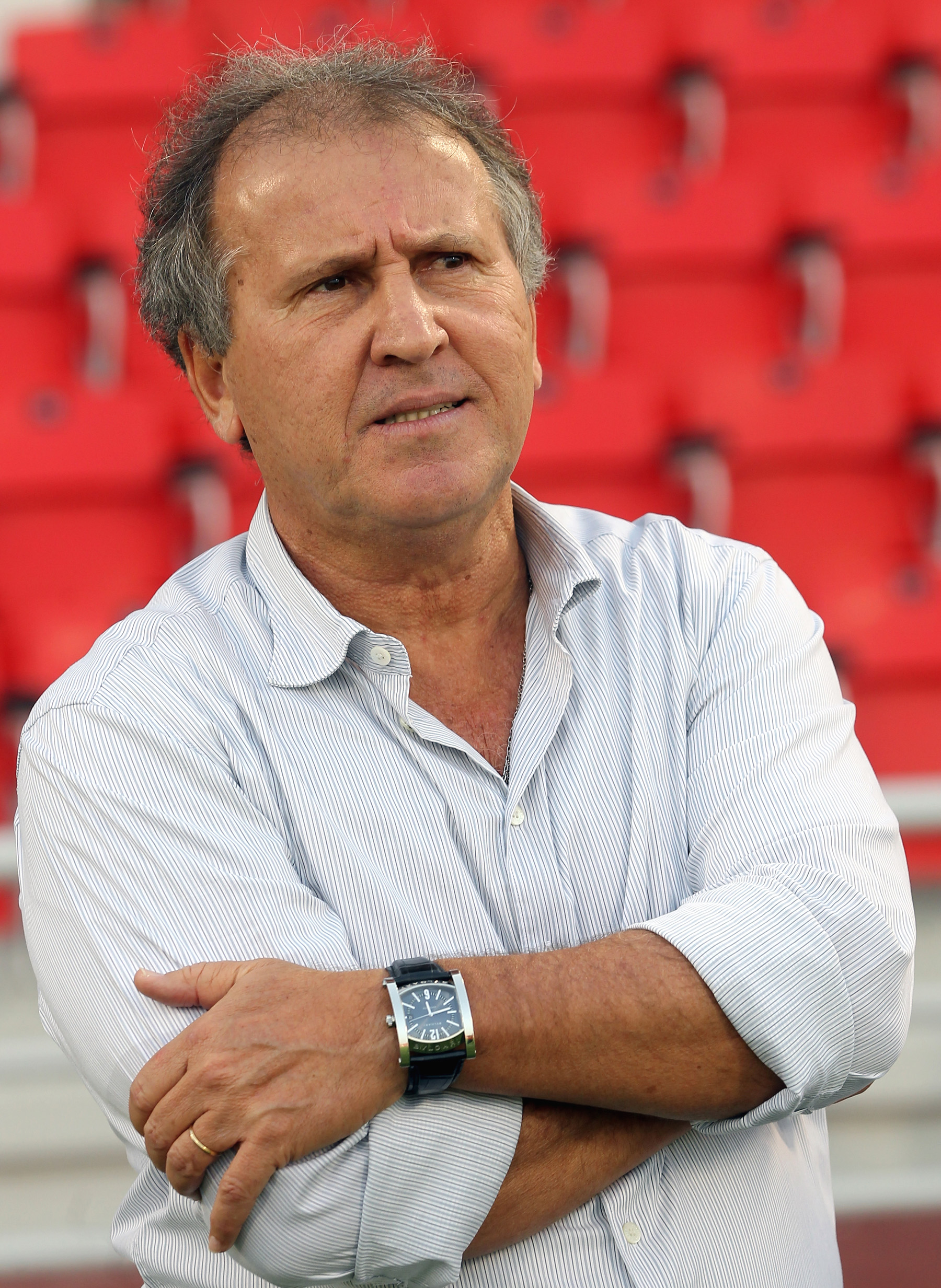
Zico

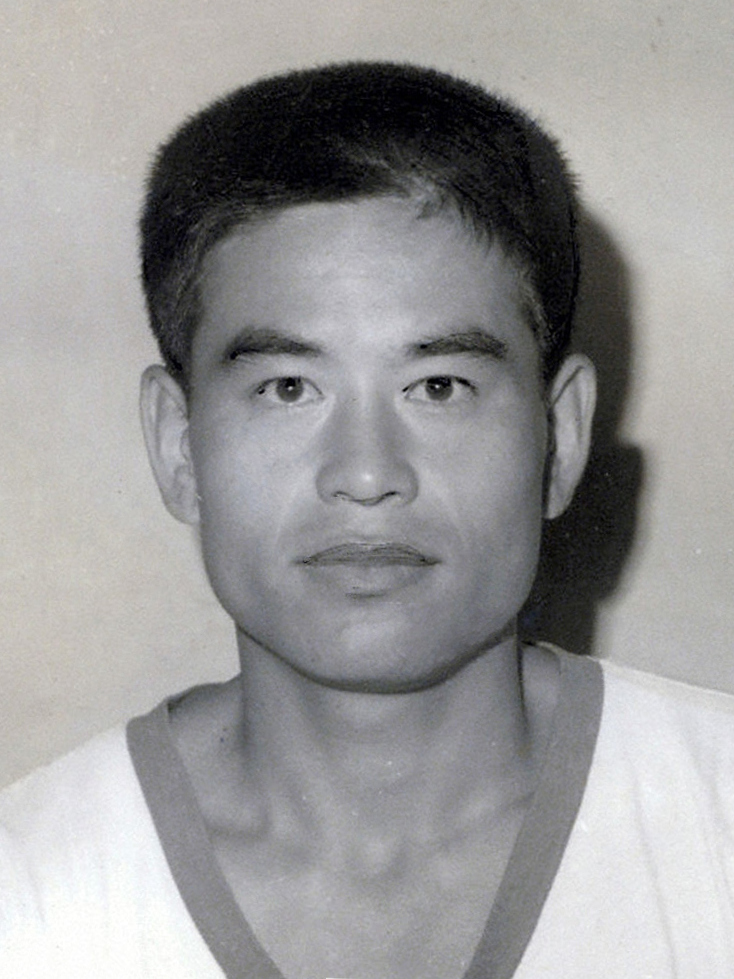
Saburo Kawabuchi

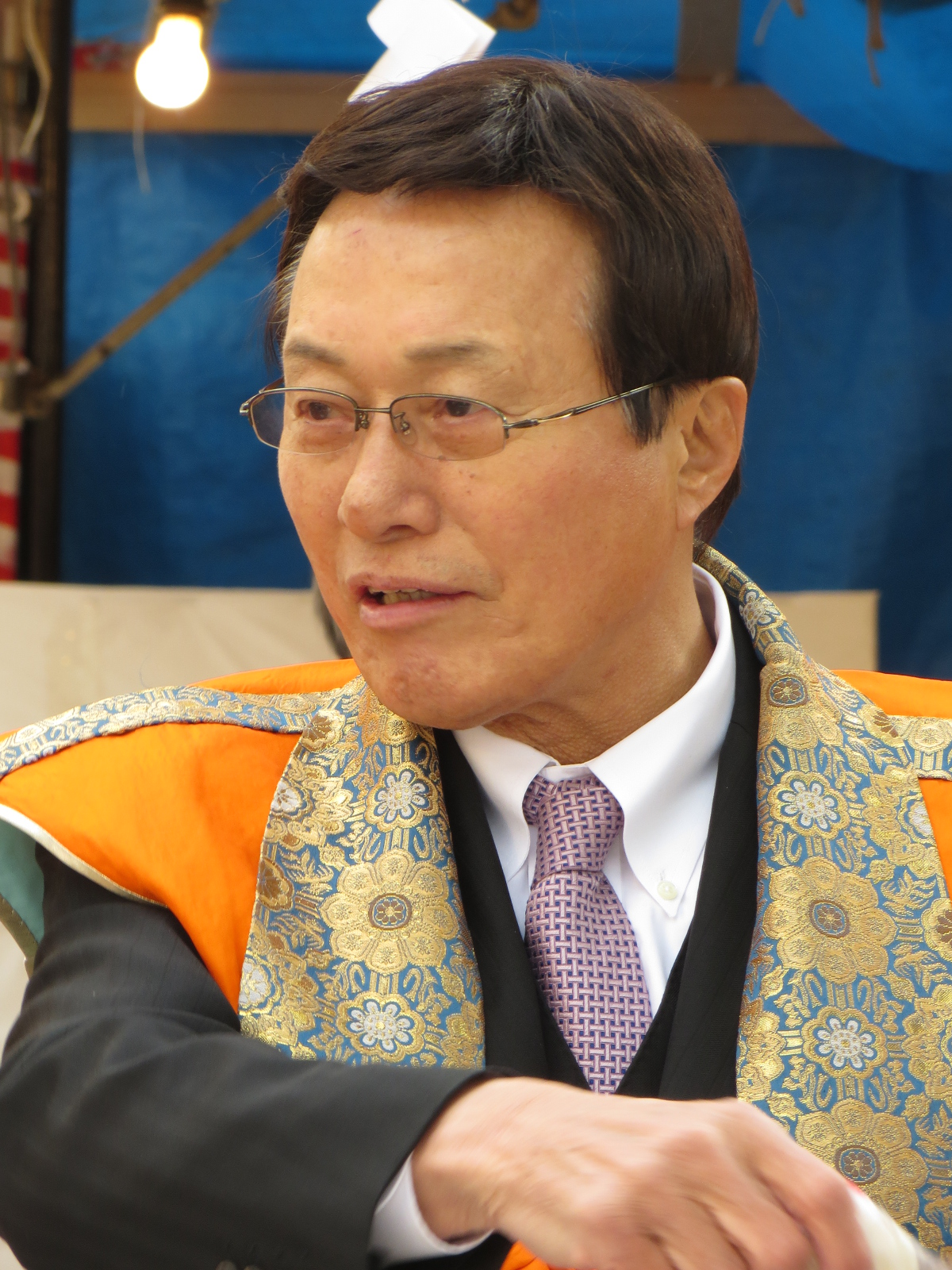
Kunishige Kamamoto

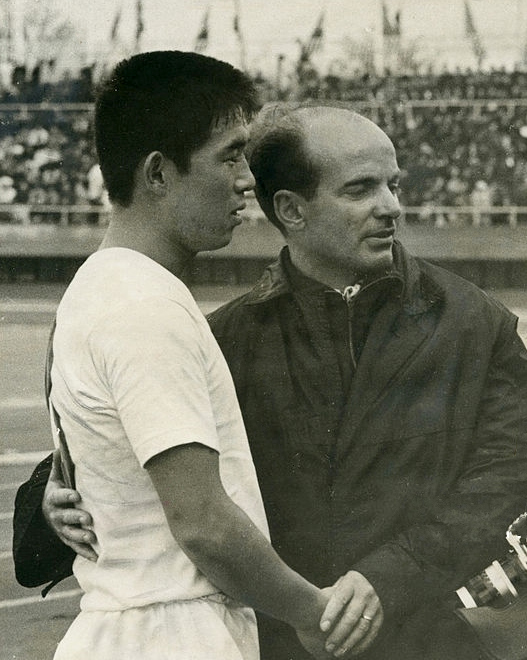
Ryuichi Sugiyama and Dettmar Cramer

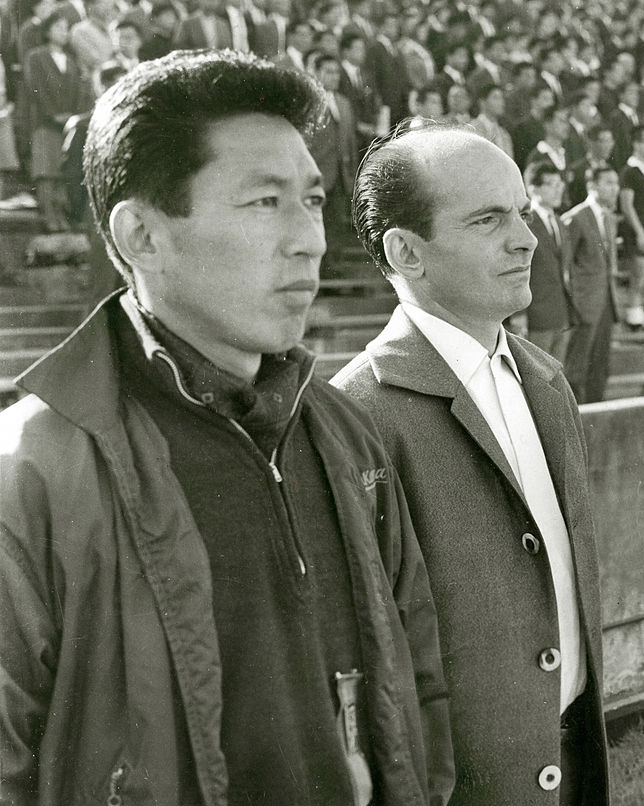
Ken Naganuma and Dettmar Cramer

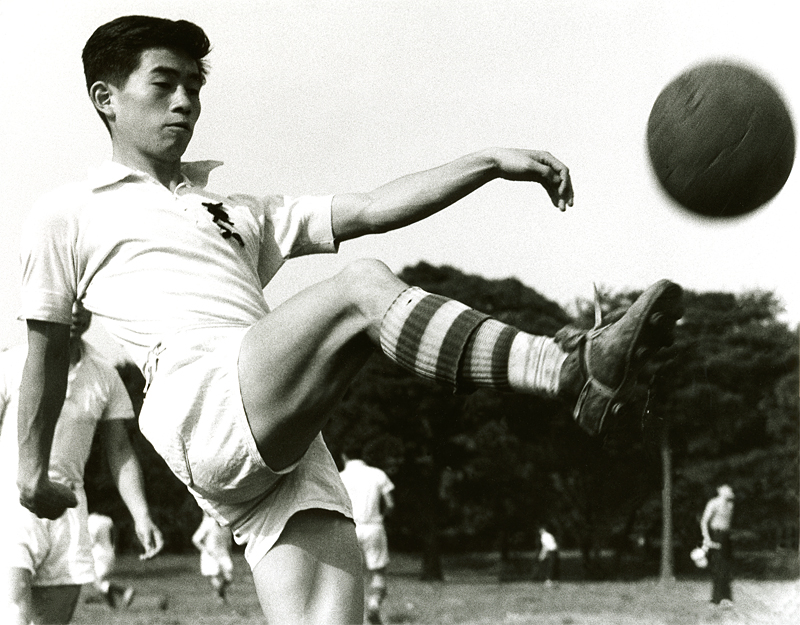
Shunichiro Okano

=== 2024 ===
- Alberto Zaccheroni

=== 2023 ===
- Hideo Osawa
- Kuniya Daini
- Sérgio Echigo
- Yōichi Takahashi
- Japan women's national football team at 2011 FIFA Women's World Cup

=== 2022 ===
- Ivica Osim
- Tadatoshi Komine (ja)
- Michie Ayabe
- Tomonori Kitayama

=== 2020 ===
- Kazushi Kimura
- Philippe Troussier

=== 2019 ===
- Akira Nishino
- Takeshi Okada
- Norio Sasaki

=== 2018 ===
- Hisashi Kato
- Ruy Ramos
- Japan national football team at 1968 Summer Olympics

=== 2017 ===
- Shu Kamo
- Kyoji Imai

=== 2016 ===
- Zico
- Japan national football team at 1936 Summer Olympics

=== 2015 ===
- Teiichi Matsumaru
- Yukio Shimomura
- Hiroshi Ninomiya
- Kenji Onitake

=== 2014 ===
- Shinroku Morohashi
- Michihiro Ozawa
- Mutsuhiko Nomura

=== 2013 ===
- Junji Ogura
- Hans Ooft
- Shizuo Takada

=== 2012 ===
- Yasuhiko Okudera
- Yoshikazu Nagai
- Katsuhiko Kaneko
- Takeshi Narahara

=== 2011 ===
- Takeo Tawa
- Sokichiro Ushiki
- Christopher W. McDonald

=== 2010 ===
- Daishiro Yoshimura
- Hiroshi Ochiai
- Hiroshi Kagawa
- Noboru Ohata
- Toshio Asami
- Ryozo Suzuki

=== 2009 ===
- Ikuo Matsumoto
- Hidetoki Takahashi
- Shiro Otani
- Yoshiyuki Maruyama

=== 2008 ===
- Saburo Kawabuchi
- William Haigh (diplomat)
- Shiro Teshima

=== 2007 ===
- Mitsuo Kamata
- Yoshitada Yamaguchi
- Hiroshi Katayama
- Kyaw Din
- Shigeyoshi Suzuki

=== 2006 ===
- Toshio Iwatani
- Takuji Ono
- Taro Kagawa
- Hideo Shinojima
- Teizo Takeuchi
- Misao Tamai
- Masanori Tokita
- Sumioki Nitta
- Hirokazu Ninomiya
- Genichi Fukushima
- Kenzo Yokoyama
- Takaji Mori
- Teruki Miyamoto
- Masashi Watanabe
- Aritatsu Ogi
- Gendo Tsuboi
- Tairei Uchino

=== 2005 ===
- Kunishige Kamamoto
- Ryuichi Sugiyama
- Ryuzo Hiraki
- Masakatsu Miyamoto
- Shigeo Yaegashi
- Jikichi Imamura
- Ryutaro Fukao
- Ryutaro Takahashi
- Yuzuru Nozu
- Tomisaburo Hirai
- Shizuo Fujita
- Hideo Shimada (footballer)
- Ken Naganuma
- Shunichiro Okano
- Taizo Kawamoto
- Dettmar Cramer
- Goro Yamada
- Shigemaru Takenokoshi
- Chitaro Tanabe
- Shigeaki Murakata
