= 1952 Emperor's Cup =

Tournament details
- Country: Japan

Final positions
- Champions: All Keio
- Runners-up: Osaka Club
- Semifinalists: Kwangaku Club; Shida Soccer

Statistics of Emperor's Cup in the 1952 season.

== Overview ==
It was contested by 16 teams, and All Keio won the championship.

== Results ==
=== 1st Round ===
- All Keio 4–0 Sendai Soccer
- Toyo Industries 3–2 Rokko Club
- All Rikkyo – (retired) Hokkaido
- Kariya Soccer 0–2 Kwangaku Club
- Shida Soccer 3–0 Toyama Soccer
- Matsuyama Club 2–2 (lottery) Meiji University
- Tokyo University of Education 6–0 Niraha Club
- Shimabara Club 0–4 Osaka Club

=== Quarterfinals ===
- All Keio 3–0 Toyo Industries
- All Rikkyo 0–1 Kwangaku Club
- Shida Soccer 3–0 Matsuyama Club
- Tokyo University of Education 1–2 Osaka Club

=== Semifinals ===
- All Keio 1–0 Kwangaku Club
- Shida Soccer 1–3 Osaka Club

=== Final ===
- All Keio 6–2 Osaka Club

All Keio won the championship.
