= 1951 Emperor's Cup =

Tournament details
- Country: Japan

Final positions
- Champions: Keio BRB
- Runners-up: Osaka Club
- Semifinalists: All Kwangaku; Sendai Soccer

Statistics of Emperor's Cup (a Japanese association football competition) in the 1951 season.

== Overview ==
It was contested by 14 teams, and Keio BRB won the championship.

== Results ==
=== 1st Round ===
- Niraha Club 2–0 Nittetsu Futase
- All Rikkyo 7–0 Morioka Soccer
- Matsuyama Commercial High School 0–10 Keio BRB
- Waseda University WMW 8–0 Sapporo Club
- Kariya Club 1–4 Sendai Soccer
- Toyama Soccer 0–1 Okayama University

=== Quarterfinals ===
- All Kwangaku 2–0 Niraha Club
- All Rikkyo 0–1 Keio BRB
- Waseda University WMW 0–1 Sendai Soccer
- Okayama University 0–9 Osaka Club

=== Semifinals ===
- All Kwangaku 0–4 Keio BRB
- Sendai Soccer 1–6 Osaka Club

=== Final ===
- Keio BRB 3–2 Osaka Club

Keio BRB won the championship.
