= Football at the 1934 Far Eastern Championship Games =

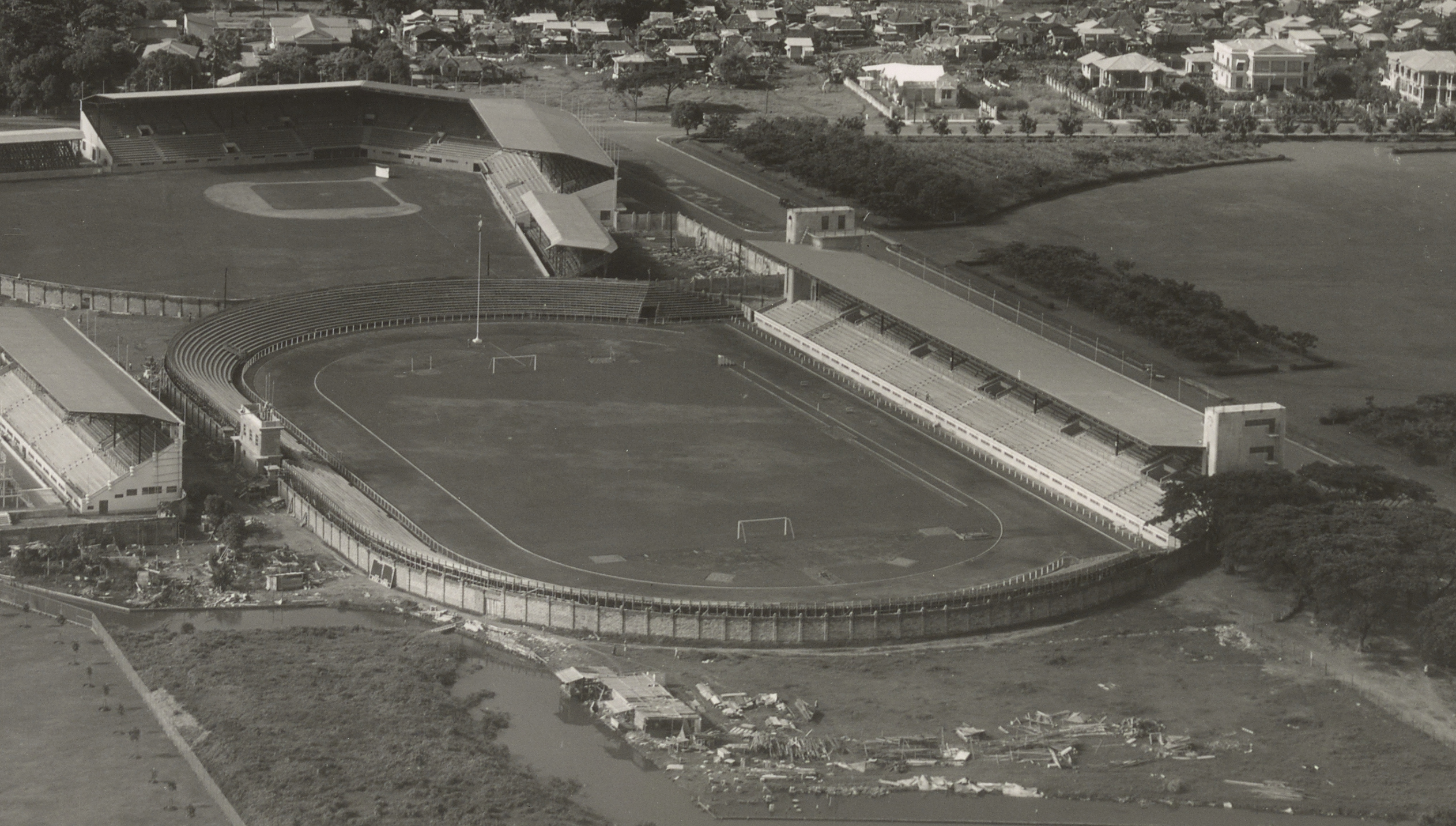
- Rizal Memorial Stadium, the venue of the games.

Tournament details
- Host country: Philippines
- Dates: 12–20 May
- Teams: 4
- Venue: 1 (in 1 host city)

Final positions
- Champions: China (9th title)

Tournament statistics
- Matches played: 6
- Goals scored: 31 (5.17 per match)
- Top scorer(s): Five players (3 goals each)

Football at the 1934 Far Eastern Games, held in Manila, Philippines was won by China while no other medals were awarded for second or third place.

== Teams ==
- China
- Dutch East Indies
- Japan
- Philippines

== Results ==
Team	Pld	W	D	L	GF	GA	GAv	Pts
China	3	3	0	0	8	3	2.67	6
Dutch East Indies	3	1	0	2	9	6	1.50	2
Philippines	3	1	0	2	6	8	0.75	2
Japan	3	1	0	2	8	14	0.71	2

12 May 1934
17:00

China	2–0	Philippines
Tam Kong Pak 48'; Lee Wai Tong 75'	Report

Rizal Memorial Stadium, Manila
Attendance: 40,000
Referee: Manuel Amechazurra

13 May 1934
17:00

Japan	1–7	Dutch East Indies
Kawamoto 42'	Report; Report	Jahn 16', 50', 65'; Hong Djien 27'; Hian Goan 37', 56', 58'

Rizal Memorial Stadium, Manila

14 May 1934
17:00

China	2–0	Dutch East Indies
Tso Kwai Shing 45'; Fung King Cheong (?)	Report

Rizal Memorial Stadium, Manila
Attendance: 12,000

15 May 1934
17:00

Japan	4–3	Philippines
Kawamoto 30'; Otani 47'; Nishimura 52'; Nozawa 67'	Report; Report	Heredia 1', 15'; Miranda 14'

Rizal Memorial Stadium, Manila

19 May 1934
17:00

Philippines	3–2	Dutch East Indies
Gutierrez (?); Heredia (?); Azaola		Suwu Lontoh (?)

Rizal Memorial Stadium, Manila

20 May 1934
17:00

China	4–3	Japan
Tam Kong Pak 6', 11'; Lee Wai Tong 65', 76' (pen.)	Report	Nozawa 60', 72'; Natori 74'

Rizal Memorial Stadium, Manila

== Winner ==
1934 Far Eastern Championship Games

China
Ninth title

== Statistics ==
=== Goalscorers ===
There were 31 goals scored in 6 matches, for an average of 5.17 goals per match.

3 goals

- (Republic of China (1912–1949)) Lee Wai Tong
- (Republic of China (1912–1949)) Tam Kong Pak
- (Dutch East Indies) Ludwich Jahn
- (Dutch East Indies) Tio Hian Goan
- (Japan) Akira Nozawa
- (Philippines) Emilio Heredia

2 goals

- (Japan) Taizo Kawamoto
- (Dutch East Indies) Suwu Lontoh

1 goal

- (Republic of China (1912–1949)) Fung King Cheong
- (Republic of China (1912–1949)) Tso Kwai Shing
- (Dutch East Indies) Tan Hong Djien
- (Japan) Ichiji Otani
- (Japan) Shoichi Nishimura
- (Japan) Takeshi Natori
- (Philippines) Francisco Gutierrez
- (Philippines) José Miranda
- (Philippines) Manuel Azaola
