= 2019 Emperor's Cup final =

2019 Emperor's Cup Final
2019年天皇杯決勝 (in Japanese)
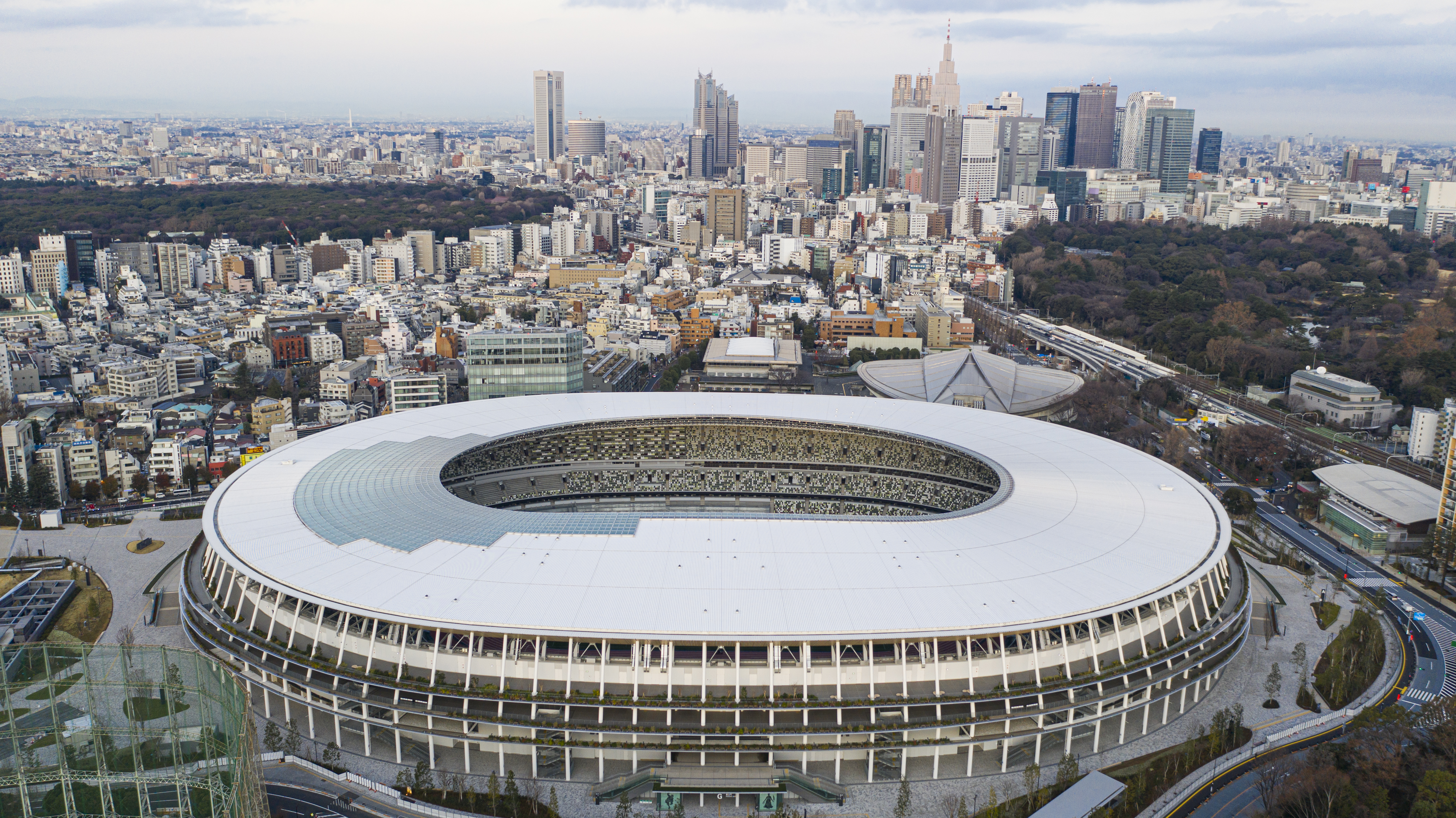
- The match took place at Japan National Stadium
- Event: 2019 Emperor's Cup
Vissel Kobe	Kashima Antlers
J1 League	J1 League
2	0
- Date: 1 January 2020
- Venue: Japan National Stadium, Tokyo
- Referee: Ryuji Sato
- Attendance: 57,597
- Weather: Sunny, 10 °C (50 °F)

The 2019 Emperor's Cup Final was an association football match between Vissel Kobe and Kashima Antlers on 1 January 2020 at Japan National Stadium in Tokyo. It was the inaugural sporting event in the stadium, newly opened for the 2020 Olympic Games. It was the 99th edition Emperor's Cup, organised by the Japan Football Association (JFA). Vissel Kobe were playing in their first ever Emperor's Cup final. Kashima Antlers were playing their first Emperor's Cup final since they lifted the trophy in 2016, when they won 2–1 against Kawasaki Frontale after extra time.

Ryuji Sato was the referee for the match, which was played in front of 57,597 spectators. Vissel Kobe dominated the first-half of play and broke the deadlock after 18 minutes following an own-goal by Tomoya Inukai, then doubled their lead 20 minutes later after the ball ricocheted off striker Noriaki Fujimoto into the net. The match ended 2–0 to Vissel Kobe, who won their first ever trophy in their first final appearance in the competition.

As winners, Vissel Kobe automatically qualified for the group stage of the 2020 AFC Champions League.

== Teams ==
Team	League	Previous finals appearances (bold indicates winners)
Vissel Kobe	J1 League	0
Kashima Antlers	J1 League	7 (1993, **1997**, **2000**, 2002, **2007**, **2010**, **2016**)

== Route to the final ==
The tournament consisted of 88 teams in a knockout format. The first round contained 48 teams made up of 47 prefectural cup winners and one amateur team (winners of the 67th All Japan University Soccer Championship, Hosei University). The second round then introduced the 18 J1 League clubs and the 22 J2 League clubs. At this round, both of the finalists entered the tournament.

**Vissel Kobe**		Round	**Kashima Antlers**	
Opponent	Result	2019 Emperor's Cup	Opponent	Result
Bye		First round	Bye	
Giravanz Kitakyushu **(J3)**	4–0	Second round	Hokuriku University	3–1
Omiya Ardija **(J2)**	4–0	Third round	Tochigi SC **(J2)**	4–0
Kawasaki Frontale **(J1)**	3–2	Fourth round	Yokohama F. Marinos **(J1)**	4–1
Oita Trinita **(J1)**	1–0	Quarterfinals	Honda FC **(JFL)**	1–0
Shimizu S-Pulse **(J1)**	3–1	Semifinals	V-Varen Nagasaki **(J2)**	3–2

== Pre-match ==
=== Venue selection ===
The final was hosted in the newly rebuilt Japan National Stadium – the first time the final had been hosted in the national stadium since 2013. The game served as the inaugural sporting event at the venue.

=== Analysis ===
Vissel Kobe had never reached further than the semi-final stage of any knockout tournament in their history. Kashima Antlers had previously won the competition 5 times, the most recent coming in 2016. In their meetings in the 2019 J1 League, Kashima Antlers won their first meeting away at Vissel Kobe, with Vissel then later winning the reverse fixture. Vissel Kobe had a more convincing run to the final, defeating three J1 League teams en route. Kashima Antlers only met one J1 team but on their way unconvincingly beat JFL team Honda FC 1–0 in the quarter-finals.

== Match ==
=== First half ===
Vissel Kobe started the game brightly with Andrés Iniesta central to their good play. One of their early chances came down the right, with Kyogo Furuhashi breaking down the right-side and providing a pull-back cross for Noriaki Fujimoto who blazed his shot over the bar. Kobe kept the pressure on and following a surge into the box by Gotoku Sakai, Lukas Podolski managed to retain possession and fire a tightly angled attempt at goalkeeper Kwoun Sun-tae, who could only parry it into his teammate Tomoya Inukai with the ball rebounding into the net. Kashima were limited in their chances – coming closest with a volley from striker Serginho after Kobe failed to clear following a free kick. Kobe continued their strong play and after Podolski had a goal disallowed for an offside in the build-up, it wasn't long before Kobe's second goal was scored. Former Antlers player Daigo Nishi was offered too much space on the right-side and provided a cross which was bundled into the goal by Fujimoto, following a mistake from Kashima defender Inukai.

=== Second half ===
In response to the humbling first-half, Kashima manager Oiwa made a half-time substitution, bringing attacking midfielder Shoma Doi on in place of Ryohei Shirasaki. Kashima played more offensively and managed to create a number of half-chances, but a combination of poor finishing and strong defending from Reo Osaki kept Kashima out. Kashima then changed their formation to play three at the back and match Vissel Kobe's 3-4-3, which made the game a tighter contest and allowed them much more possession and wing-play. However Kashima struggled to break down Kobe and create any meaningful chances, with Kobe's pacey Furuhashi and Fujimoto threatening on the counter. Kobe had a chance to finish the game off late on, but striker Junya Tanaka was only able to strike a weak shot from 6 yards out at goalkeeper Kwoun, after a fine break down the left by Podolski. As the game drew to a close, it was a chance for the fans of Vissel Kobe to say goodbye to legendary player David Villa, who made a cameo appearance in added time – his last professional appearance before retirement.

=== Details ===
1 January 2020
14:37 JST

Vissel Kobe	2–0	Kashima Antlers
Inukai 18' (o.g.); Fujimoto 38'	Report

Japan National Stadium, Tokyo
Attendance: 57,597
Referee: Ryuji Sato

GK	18	(Japan) Hiroki Iikura
DF	33	(Brazil) Dankler	(yellow card) 57'
DF	25	(Japan) Reo Osaki
DF	4	(Belgium) Thomas Vermaelen
MF	22	(Japan) Daigo Nishi
MF	5	(Japan) Hotaru Yamaguchi
MF	8	(Spain) Andrés Iniesta (c)		(substituted off) 88'
MF	24	(Japan) Gotoku Sakai
FW	10	(Germany) Lukas Podolski		(substituted off) 90+2'
FW	16	(Japan) Kyogo Furuhashi
FW	9	(Japan) Noriaki Fujimoto		(substituted off) 78'
Substitutes:
GK	1	(Japan) Daiya Maekawa
DF	3	(Japan) Hirofumi Watanabe
MF	27	(Japan) Yuta Goke
MF	35	(Japan) Takuya Yasui		(substituted on) 88'
FW	13	(Japan) Keijiro Ogawa
FW	21	(Japan) Junya Tanaka		(substituted on) 78'
FW	7	(Spain) David Villa		(substituted on) 90+2'
Manager:
(Germany) Thorsten Fink

GK	1	(South Korea) Kwoun Sun-tae
DF	6	(Japan) Ryota Nagaki (c)
DF	27	(Brazil) Bueno
DF	39	(Japan) Tomoya Inukai
DF	28	(Japan) Koki Machida
MF	30	(Japan) Shintaro Nago		(substituted off) 53'
MF	20	(Japan) Kento Misao
MF	4	(Brazil) Léo Silva	(yellow card) 77'
MF	17	(Japan) Ryohei Shirasaki		(substituted off) 46'
FW	18	(Brazil) Serginho
FW	15	(Japan) Sho Ito		(substituted off) 72'
Substitutes:
GK	21	(Japan) Hitoshi Sogahata
DF	33	(Japan) Ikuma Sekigawa
DF	16	(Japan) Shuto Yamamoto		(substituted on) 53'
DF	2	(Japan) Atsuto Uchida
MF	13	(Japan) Atsutaka Nakamura		(substituted on) 72'
MF	8	(Japan) Shoma Doi		(substituted on) 46'
FW	34	(Japan) Kotaro Arima
Manager:
(Japan) Go Oiwa

Assistant referees:
Hiroshi Yamauchi
Jun Mihara
Fourth official:
Hiroki Kasahara
Video assistant referee:
Hiroyuki Kimura
Akane Yagi

**Match rules**

- 90 minutes.
- 30 minutes of extra-time if necessary.
- Penalty shoot-out if scores still level.
- Seven named substitutes.
- Maximum of three substitutions.

=== Statistics ===
First half
Statistic	Vissel Kobe	Kashima Antlers
Goals scored	2	0
Total shots	7	1
Shots on target	3	0
Saves	0	1
Corner kicks	0	3
Fouls committed	6	8
Possession	52%	48%
Yellow cards	0	0
Red cards	0	0

Second half
Statistic	Vissel Kobe	Kashima Antlers
Goals scored	0	0
Total shots	0	2
Shots on target	0	0
Saves	0	0
Corner kicks	1	1
Fouls committed	8	8
Possession	42%	58%
Yellow cards	1	1
Red cards	0	0

Overall
Statistic	Vissel Kobe	Kashima Antlers
Goals scored	2	0
Total shots	7	3
Shots on target	3	0
Saves	0	1
Corner kicks	1	4
Fouls committed	14	16
Possession	47%	53%
Yellow cards	1	1
Red cards	0	0

== Post-match ==
By winning the match, Vissel Kobe won the first trophy in their history, vindicating the large amount of investment put into the club by chairman Hiroshi Mikitoni. Thorsten Fink, the winning manager, said "I'm really proud to have won my first title. There are many supporters who support me as well as the club, and I think it's very good for the city of Kobe". His opposite number, Go Oiwa said "It's a very disappointing result, but I've told the players that I am very grateful to them for having fought to the end". This was to be Oiwa's last match in charge of Kashima before stepping down as manager.

The monetary reward to Vissel Kobe for winning the trophy was 150,000,000円, with runners-up Kashima Antlers awarded 50,000,000円.

Vissel Kobe also automatically qualified for the group stage of the 2020 AFC Champions League following their victory.
