= 2020 Emperor's Cup final =

2020年天皇杯決勝 (in Japanese)
- Event: 2020 Emperor's Cup
Kawasaki Frontale	Gamba Osaka
1	0
- Date: 1 January 2021
- City: Shinjuku, Tokyo
- Referee: Hiroyuki Kimura
- Attendance: 13,318
- Weather: Mostly Clear; 6 °C (42 °F)

The 2020 Emperor's Cup final was the final of the 100th edition of the Emperor's Cup, the 2020 Emperor's Cup.

The match was contested at the newly rebuilt Japan National Stadium in Tokyo.

The J1 League champions Kawasaki Frontale completed the double by beating the league's runners-up Gamba Osaka 1–0 in the final, earning their first Emperor's Cup title.

== Teams ==
Team	League	Previous finals appearances (bold indicates winners)
Kawasaki Frontale	J1 League	1 (2016)
Gamba Osaka	J1 League	7 (**1990**, 2006, **2008**, **2009**, 2012, **2014**, **2015**)

== Road to the final ==
**Kawasaki Frontale**		Round	**Gamba Osaka**	
Opponent	Result	2020 Emperor's Cup	Opponent	Result
Bye		First round	Bye	
Bye		Second round	Bye	
Bye		Third round	Bye	
Bye		Fourth round	Bye	
Bye		Fifth round	Bye	
Bye		Quarterfinals	Bye	
Blaublitz Akita **(J3)**	2–0	Semifinals	Tokushima Vortis **(J2)**	2–0

== Format ==
The final was played as a single match. If tied after regulation time, extra time and, if necessary, a penalty shoot-out would have been used to decide the winning team.

== Match ==
1 January 2021
14:40 JST

Kawasaki Frontale	1–0	Gamba Osaka
Mitoma 55'	Report

Japan National Stadium, Shinjuku, Tokyo
Attendance: 13,318
Referee: Hiroyuki Kimura

**Kawasaki Frontale**	**Gamba Osaka**

=== Lineups ===
GK	1	(South Korea) Jung Sung-ryong
RB	13	(Japan) Miki Yamane
CB	4	(Brazil) Jesiel
CB	5	(Japan) Shogo Taniguchi (c)
LB	30	(Japan) Reo Hatate	(substituted off) 86'
CM	6	(Japan) Hidemasa Morita
CM	25	(Japan) Ao Tanaka
CM	10	(Japan) Ryota Oshima	(substituted off) 89'
RW	41	(Japan) Akihiro Ienaga
ST	9	(Brazil) Leandro Damião	(substituted off) 79'
LW	18	(Japan) Kaoru Mitoma	(substituted off) 79'
Substitutes:
GK	34	(Japan) Kenta Tanno
DF	44	(Japan) Shintaro Kurumaya	(substituted on) 86'
MF	15	(Japan) Kazuya Yamamura
MF	38	(Japan) Yasuto Wakizaka	(substituted on) 89'
MF	11	(Japan) Kengo Nakamura
MF	23	(Japan) Tatsuya Hasegawa	(substituted on) 79'
FW	26	(Japan) Yu Kobayashi	(substituted on) 79'
Manager:
(Japan) Toru Oniki

GK	1	(Japan) Masaaki Higashiguchi
RB	27	(Japan) Ryu Takao
CB	19	(South Korea) Kim Young-gwon
CB	5	(Japan) Genta Miura (c)
LB	4	(Japan) Hiroki Fujiharu		(substituted off) 74'
CM	21	(Japan) Shinya Yajima
CM	29	(Japan) Yuki Yamamoto		(substituted off) 74'
RM	8	(Japan) Kosuke Onose		(substituted off) 80'
AM	10	(Japan) Shu Kurata
LM	33	(Japan) Takashi Usami
ST	18	(Brazil) Patric	(yellow card) 45+2'
Substitutes:
GK	16	(Japan) Jun Ichimori
DF	13	(Japan) Shunya Suganuma
MF	14	(Japan) Yuya Fukuda		(substituted on) 74'
MF	26	(Japan) Kohei Okuno
MF	34	(Japan) Shuhei Kawasaki
FW	30	(Japan) Dai Tsukamoto		(substituted on) 80'
FW	39	(Japan) Kazuma Watanabe		(substituted on) 74'
Manager:
(Japan) Tsuneyasu Miyamoto
