= 2023 Emperor's Cup final =

2023 Emperor's Cup Final
2023年天皇杯決勝 (in Japanese)
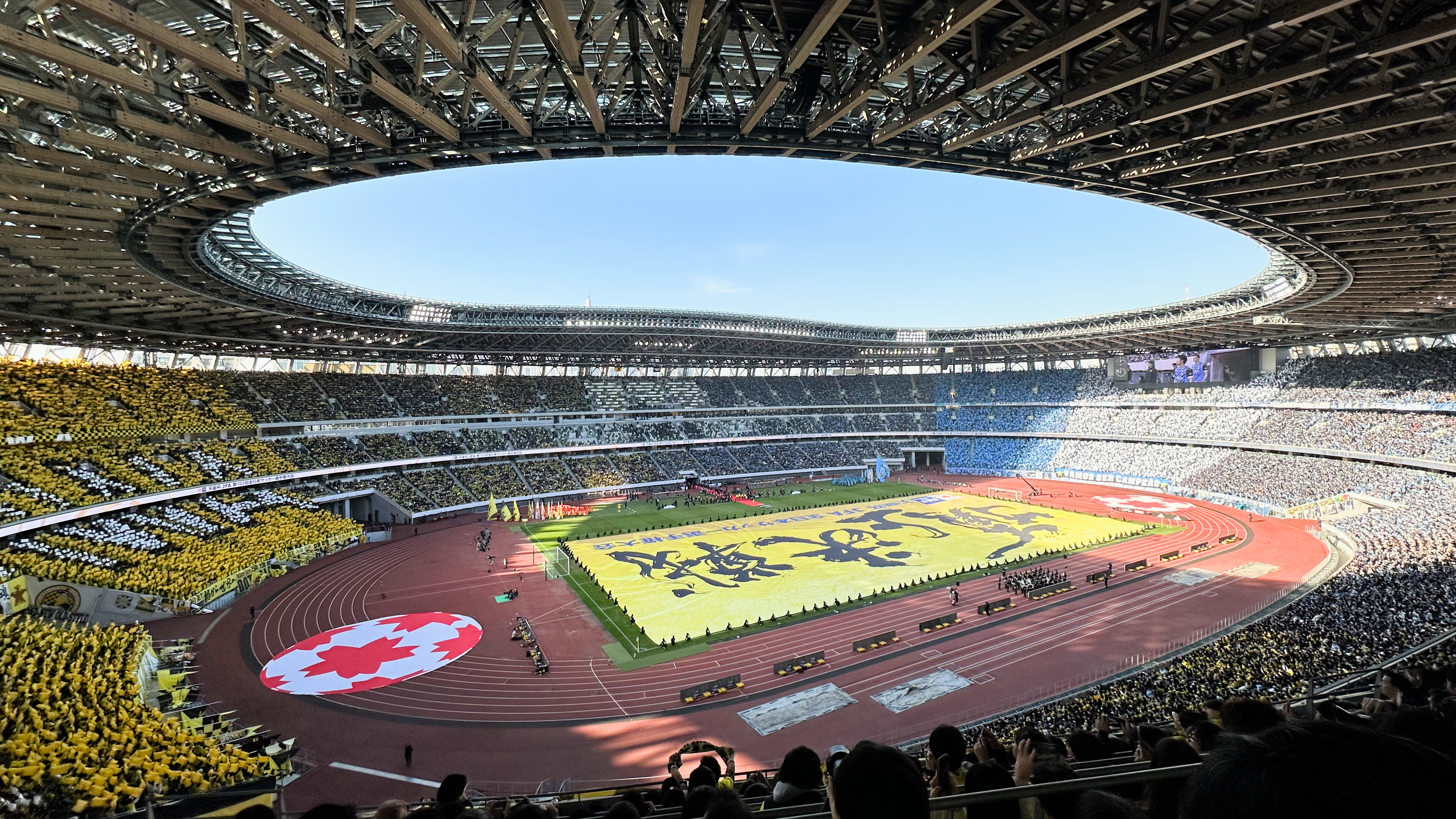
- 2023 Emperor's Cup final at Japan National Stadium
- Event: 2023 Emperor's Cup
Kawasaki Frontale	Kashiwa Reysol
J1 League	J1 League
0	0
- After extra time Kawasaki Frontale won 8–7 on penalties
- Date: 9 December 2023
- Venue: Japan National Stadium, Tokyo
- Referee: Hiroyuki Kimura
- Attendance: 62,637
- Weather: Sunny, 17 °C (63 °F)

The 2023 Emperor's Cup final was an association football match between Kawasaki Frontale and Kashiwa Reysol on 9 December 2023 at Japan National Stadium in Tokyo. It was the 103rd edition of the Emperor's Cup, organised by the Japan Football Association (JFA). Kawasaki Frontale were playing in their third Emperor's Cup final, following being champions in 2020 and runners-up in 2016. Kashiwa Reysol were also playing in their third Emperor's Cup final since they lifted the trophy in 2012 and were runners-up in 2008.

Hiroyuki Kimura was the referee for the match, which was played in front of 62,637 spectators. In an evenly fought contest where resolute defending prevailed, the match ended 0–0 in normal time and the deadlock was still not broken in 30 minutes of extra time. Kawasaki Frontale ended-up winning the subsequent penalty shoot-out 8–7, with Kawasaki goalkeeper Jung Sung-ryong scoring his teams final spot-kick and going on to save the penalty of Kashiwa goalkeeper Kenta Matsumoto.

As winners, Kawasaki Frontale automatically qualified for the group stage of the 2024–25 AFC Champions League.

== Teams ==
Team	League	Previous finals appearances (bold indicates winners)
Kawasaki Frontale	J1 League	2 (2016, **2020**)
Kashiwa Reysol	J1 League	6 (1963, **1972**, 1973, **1975**, 2008, **2012**)

== Route to the final ==
The tournament consisted of 88 teams in a knockout format. The first round contained 48 teams made up of 47 prefectural cup winners and one amateur team (Honda FC). The second round then introduced the 18 J1 League clubs and the 22 J2 League clubs. At this round, both of the finalists entered the tournament.

**Kawasaki Frontale**		Round	**Kashiwa Reysol**	
Opponent	Result	2023 Emperor's Cup	Opponent	Result
Bye		First round	Bye	
Tochigi City FC **(KSL)**	3–1	Second round	Yamanashi Gakuin Pegasus	7–1
Mito HollyHock **(J2)**	2–1	Third round	Tokushima Vortis **(J2)**	2–0
Kochi United SC **(JFL)**	1–0	Round of 16	Hokkaido Consadole Sapporo **(J1)**	1–0
Albirex Niigata **(J1)**	2–2 (4–3p)	Quarter-finals	Nagoya Grampus **(J1)**	2–0
Avispa Fukuoka **(J1)**	4–2	Semi-finals	Roasso Kumamoto **(J2)**	4–0

== Match ==
=== Details ===
9 December 2023
14:03 JST

Kawasaki Frontale	0–0 (a.e.t.)	Kashiwa Reysol
	Report
Penalties
Ienaga (penalty scored); Segawa (penalty scored); Yamamura (penalty scored); Tachibanada (penalty scored); Gomis (penalty missed); Noborizato (penalty missed); Tono (penalty scored); Yamane (penalty scored); João Schmidt (penalty scored); Jung Sung-ryong (penalty scored)	8–7	(penalty scored) Matheus Sávio; (penalty scored) Hosoya; (penalty scored) Toshima; (penalty missed) Sento; (penalty scored) Muto; (penalty missed) Katayama; (penalty scored) Yamamoto; (penalty scored) Kawaguchi; (penalty scored) Tatsuta; (penalty missed) Matsumoto

Japan National Stadium, Tokyo
Attendance: 62,637
Referee: Hiroyuki Kimura

GK	1	(South Korea) Jung Sung-ryong
DF	13	(Japan) Miki Yamane
DF	3	(Japan) Takuma Ominami		(substituted off) 87'
DF	31	(Japan) Kazuya Yamamura
DF	2	(Japan) Kyohei Noborizato
MF	8	(Japan) Kento Tachibanada (c)
MF	14	(Japan) Yasuto Wakizaka	(yellow card) 55'	(substituted off) 87'
MF	16	(Japan) Tatsuki Seko		(substituted off) 64'
FW	41	(Japan) Akihiro Ienaga
FW	33	(Japan) Taisei Miyashiro		(substituted off) 64'
FW	9	(Brazil) Leandro Damião		(substituted off) 77'
Substitutes:
GK	99	(Japan) Naoto Kamifukumoto
DF	4	(Brazil) Jesiel		(substituted on) 87'
MF	6	(Brazil) João Schmidt		(substituted on) 87'
MF	30	(Japan) Yusuke Segawa		(substituted on) 64'
FW	17	(Japan) Daiya Tono		(substituted on) 64'
FW	18	(France) Bafétimbi Gomis		(substituted on) 106'
FW	11	(Japan) Yu Kobayashi	(substituted off) 106'	(substituted on) 77'
Manager:
(Japan) Toru Oniki

GK	46	(Japan) Kenta Matsumoto
DF	16	(Japan) Eiichi Katayama
DF	50	(Japan) Yugo Tatsuta
DF	4	(Japan) Taiyo Koga (c)
DF	34	(Japan) Takumi Tsuchiya		(substituted off) 90+3'
MF	5	(Japan) Tomoki Takamine	(yellow card) 53'	(substituted off) 90+3'
MF	6	(Japan) Keiya Shiihashi		(substituted off) 104'
MF	14	(Japan) Tomoya Koyamatsu		(substituted off) 77'
FW	10	(Brazil) Matheus Sávio
FW	11	(Japan) Kota Yamada		(substituted off) 77'
FW	19	(Japan) Mao Hosoya
Substitutes:
GK	21	(Japan) Masato Sasaki
DF	2	(Japan) Hiromu Mitsumaru
DF	24	(Japan) Naoki Kawaguchi		(substituted on) 90+3'
MF	41	(Japan) Keiya Sento		(substituted on) 90+3'
MF	28	(Japan) Sachiro Toshima		(substituted on) 77'
FW	45	(Japan) Ota Yamamoto		(substituted on) 77'
FW	9	(Japan) Yuki Muto		(substituted on) 104'
Manager:
(Japan) Masami Ihara

Assistant referees:
Jun Mihara
Kota Watanabe
Fourth official:
Akihiko Ikeuchi
Video assistant referee:
Jumpei Iida
Assistant video assistant referee:
Takumi Takagi

**Match rules**

- 90 minutes.
- 30 minutes of extra-time if necessary.
- Penalty shoot-out if scores still level.
- Seven named substitutes.
- Maximum of five substitutions.

=== Statistics ===
Overall
Statistic	Kawasaki Frontale	Kashiwa Reysol
Goals scored	0	0
Total shots	7	22
Shots on target	4	13
Saves	13	4
Corner kicks	2	8
Possession	53%	47%
Yellow cards	1	1
Red cards	0	0
