= Kōta Watanabe =

Kōta Watanabe may refer to:

- Kōta Watanabe (footballer)
- Kota Watanabe (referee)
- Kota Watanabe (field hockey)
