= List of New York City FC records and statistics =

New York City FC is an American professional soccer team based in New York City. The club was founded in 2013 as a Major League Soccer expansion franchise, playing its first games in 2015.

This list encompasses the various records and statistics associated with the team's competitive performances since inception and their record attendances. The player records section includes details of the club's leading goalscorers, goalkeepers, coaches, and those who have made most appearances in first-team competitions.

== Player records ==
Player Appearances Maxi Moralez 224 appearances Sean Johnson 207 appearances Maxime Chanot 196 appearances Alex Callens 193 appearances Keaton Parks 192 appearances James Sands/Santi Rodriguez 142 appearances Anton Tinnerholm 136 appearances Taty Castellanos 134 appearances Alex Ring 129 appearances David Villa 128 appearances Ronald Matarrita 120 appearances Jesus Medina 117 appearances Tayvon Gray 114 appearances Thiago Martins 105 appearances

=== Goalscorers ===
- Most goals scored in all competitions: **80** – David Villa
- Most goals scored in Major League Soccer: **77** – David Villa
- Most goals scored in MLS Cup Playoffs: **3** - David Villa, Valentín Castellanos
- Most goals scored in US Open Cup: **2** – Kwadwo Poku, Keaton Parks
- Youngest goalscorer: 19 years, 2 months, 20 days – Talles Magno
- Oldest goalscorer: 38 years, 1 month, 17 days – Frank Lampard

As of October 21, 2023 (all competitive matches):

Rank	Name	Period	MLS	Playoffs	Open Cup	Continental	Total
1	(Spain) David Villa	2015–2018	77	3	0	0	80
2	(Argentina) Valentín Castellanos	2018–2022	51*	3	0	5	59
3	(Argentina) **Maximiliano Moralez**	2017–2022 2023–Present	27*	5	1	2	35
4	(Brazil) Héber	2019–2022	24	2	1	3	30
5	(Libya) Ismael Tajouri-Shradi	2018–2021	26	2	1	0	29
6	(Paraguay) Jesús Medina	2018–2021	25*	0	1	0	26
7	(Romania) Alexandru Mitriță	2019–2020	16	0	1	1	18
7	(Brazil) **Talles Magno**	2021–Present	13	2	0	3	18
7	(Uruguay) **Santiago Rodríguez**	2021–Present	12	1	1	4	18
8	(England) Frank Lampard	2015–2016	15	0	0	0	15
8	(Brazil) Gabriel Pereira	2022-2023	14	1	0	0	15
8	(Peru) Alexander Callens	2017-2022	11	1	0	3	15

- Included the goals (2 Medina, 1 Castellanos and 1 Moralez) in the 2 games of the knockout stage in the "MLS is Back Tournament" in 2020.

Bold signifies a current New York City player.

=== Shutouts ===
As of September 29, 2019 (all competitive matches):

Place	Name	Period	MLS	Playoffs	Open Cup	Continental	Total
1	(United States) Sean Johnson	2017–2022	24	1	0	0	**25**
2	(Puerto Rico) Josh Saunders	2015–2016	12	0	0	0	**12**

Bold signifies a current New York City player

== Coaching records ==
As of April 7, 2020

Coach	From	To	Record				
Coach	From	To	G	W	D	L	Win %
(United States) Jason Kreis	December 11, 2013	November 2, 2015	35	10	7	18	28.57
(France) Patrick Vieira	January 1, 2016	June 11, 2018	90	40	22	28	44.44
(Spain) Domènec Torrent	June 12, 2018	November 8, 2019	45	20	13	12	44.44
(Norway) Ronny Deila	January 6, 2020	present	4	2	0	2	50.00
Total			174	72	42	60	41.38

== List of seasons ==
Season	League									Position		Playoffs	USOC	Continental / Other		Average Attendance	Top Goalscorer(s) (Note: Includes all goals scored in League, MLS Cup Playoffs, U.S. Open Cup, MLS is Back Tournament, CONCACAF Champions League, FIFA Club World Cup, and other continental matches.)	
Season	Pld	W	L	D	GF	GA	GD	Pts	PPG	Conf.	Overall	Playoffs	USOC	Continental / Other		Average Attendance	Name(s)	Goals
2015	34	10	17	7	49	58	–9	37	1.09	8th	17th	DNQ	DNQ	DNE		29,016	(Spain) David Villa	18
2016	34	15	10	9	62	57	+5	54	1.59	2nd	4th	QF	R4	DNQ		27,196	(Spain) David Villa	23
2017	34	16	9	9	56	43	+13	57	1.68	2nd	2nd	QF	R4	DNQ		22,177	(Spain) David Villa	24
2018	34	16	10	8	59	45	+14	56	1.65	3rd	7th	QF	R4	DNQ		23,211	(Spain) David Villa	15
2019	34	18	6	10	63	42	+21	64	1.88	1st	2nd	QF	QF	DNQ		21,107	(Brazil) Héber	15
2020	23	12	8	3	37	25	+12	39	1.70	5th	7th	R1	NH	CONCACAF Champions League MLS is Back Tournament	QF QF	0	(Argentina) Valentín Castellanos (Paraguay) Jesús Medina	7
2021	34	14	11	9	56	36	+20	51	1.5	4th	8th	W	NH	2021 Leagues Cup	QF		(Argentina) Valentín Castellanos	23
Total	227	101	71	55	382	306	+76	358	1.58	–	–	–	–	–	–	–	(Spain) David Villa	80

1. Avg. attendance include statistics from league matches only.

== International results ==
=== By competition ===
As of December 15, 2020

Competition	Pld	W	D	L	GF	GA	GD	% W
CONCACAF Champions League	4	2	0	2	6	8	–2	50.00
Total	4	2	0	2	6	8	–2	50.00

=== By club ===
As of December 15, 2020 (Includes CONCACAF Champions League)

Club	Pld	W	D	L	GF	GA	GD
(Costa Rica) San Carlos	2	2	0	0	6	3	+3
(Mexico) UANL	2	0	0	2	0	5	–5

=== By country ===
As of December 15, 2020 (Includes CONCACAF Champions League)

Country	Pld	W	D	L	GF	GA	GD
Costa Rica	2	2	0	0	6	3	+3
Mexico	2	0	0	2	0	5	–5

== Transfer records ==
=== Highest transfer fees paid ===
#	Pos.	Player	From	Fee	Date
1.	Midfielder	(Romania) Alexandru Mitriță	(Romania) Universitatea Craiova	$9 million	January 2019
2.	Defender	(Denmark) Malte Amundsen	(Denmark) Vejle Boldklub	$1.6 million	February 2021

=== Highest transfer fees received ===
#	Pos.	Player	To	Fee	Date
1.	Midfielder	(England) Jack Harrison	(England) Manchester City	$6 million	January 2018
2.	Midfielder	(United States) Joseph Scally	(Germany) Borussia Mönchengladbach	$2 million	November 2019

== Designated Players ==
- (Argentina) **Maximiliano Moralez**
- (England) Frank Lampard
- (Italy) Andrea Pirlo
- (Paraguay) **Jesús Medina**
- (Romania) **Alexandru Mitriță**
- (Spain) David Villa

Bold signifies a current New York City player
