= Kota Watanabe (referee) =

Japanese football referee (born 1990)

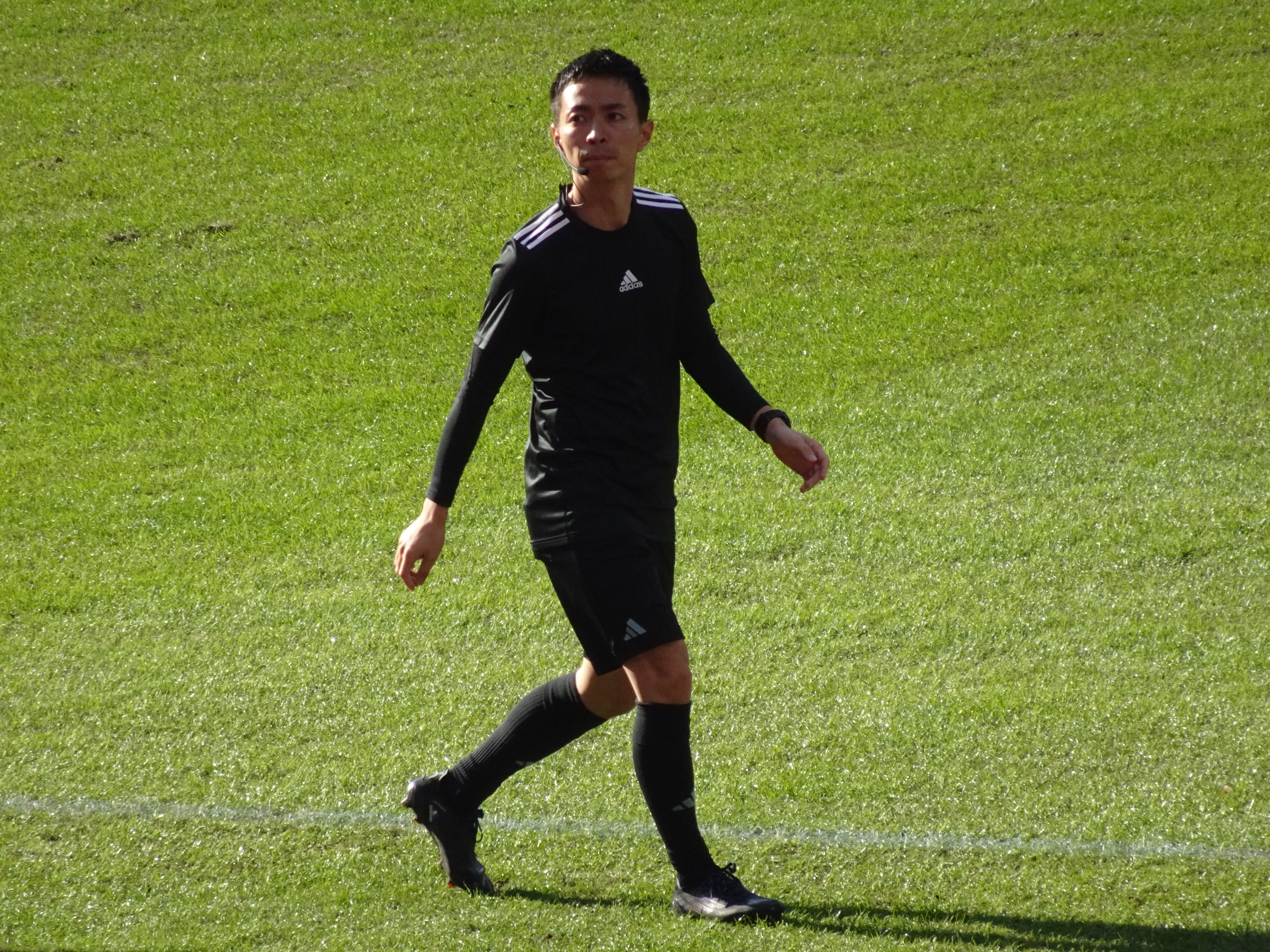
- Watanabe during the 2023 Emperor's Cup final, December 2019
- Full name: Kota Watanabe
- Born: 21 September 1990 (age 36); Takatsuki, Osaka, Japan

Domestic
Years	League	Role
2014–	J. League Division 1	Referee

International
Years	League	Role
2021-present	FIFA listed	Referee assistant referee VAR official

Kota Watanabe (渡辺康太, Watanabe Kōta; born 21 September 1990) is a Japanese international association football referee and a VAR official.

== Biography ==
Watanabe started playing football at his local club in Takatsuki, Osaka, when he was in the 4th grade of elementary school. After attending Yanagawa Junior High School in Takatsuki, he began pursuing his referee certification while attending Takatsuki Kita High School. Watanabe obtained his Level 1 referee certification in 2014 after graduating from Ryosai Medical and Sports College. In 2016, Watanabe received the Outstanding Referee Award for his performance at the 2016 Japan Football League.

In 2021, at the age of 30, Watanabe was bestowed with the international FIFA badge. In February 2023, he signed a professional referee contract with the Osaka Prefecture Football Association.

In 2019, Watanabe officiated in his first J1 match between Shonan Bellmare and Kawasaki Frontale. He finally reached, in 2024, the milestone of officiating in 100 matches as an assistant referee in the J1 League during the match between Gamba Osaka and Hokkaido Consadole Sapporo, becoming the 73rd Japanese referee to get to the level.
