= David Villa =

Spanish professional footballer (born 1981)

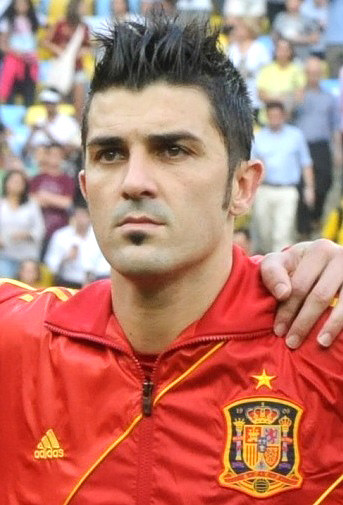
- Villa with Spain in 2013

Personal information
- Full name: David Villa Sánchez
- Date of birth: 3 December 1981 (age 44)
- Place of birth: Langreo, Spain
- Height: 1.75 m (5 ft 9 in)
- Position: Striker

Youth career
- 1991–1999: Langreo
- 1999–2000: Sporting Gijón

Senior career*
Years	Team	Apps	(Gls)
2000–2001	Sporting Gijón B	36	(14)
2001–2003	Sporting Gijón	80	(38)
2003–2005	Real Zaragoza	73	(32)
2005–2010	Valencia	166	(108)
2010–2013	Barcelona	77	(33)
2013–2014	Atlético Madrid	36	(13)
2014–2018	New York City FC	117	(77)
2014	→ Melbourne City (loan)	4	(2)
2019–2020	Vissel Kobe	28	(13)
Total		617	(330)

International career
2001–2002	Asturias	2	(1)
2002–2003	Spain U21	7	(0)
2005–2017	Spain	98	(59)
Medal record
Men's Football
Representing Spain
FIFA World Cup
Winner	2010 South Africa
UEFA European Championship
Winner	2008 Austria–Switzerland
FIFA Confederations Cup
Runner-up	2013 Brazil
Third place	2009 South Africa
- * Club domestic league appearances and goals

David Villa Sánchez (Spanish pronunciation: [daˈβið ˈbiʎa santʃeθ]; born 3 December 1981) is a Spanish former professional footballer who played as a striker. Regarded as one of the best strikers of his generation, he is the all-time top goalscorer of the Spain national team. Villa is currently the vice-president of Spanish Tercera Federación club CF Benidorm and a member of the Board of Directors of La Liga club Atlético Madrid.

Nicknamed El Guaje (The Kid in Asturian) due to a reputation of playing football with children much older than him, Villa sustained a serious injury as a child but managed to start his professional career with Sporting de Gijón in 2001. He moved to Real Zaragoza after two seasons, where he made his La Liga debut, and won the Copa del Rey and Supercopa de España. He joined Valencia in 2005 for a transfer fee of €12 million and captured another Copa del Rey title.

After a five-season tenure in Valencia where Villa elevated into one of the best players in La Liga, he signed for Barcelona for €40 million in 2010. In his first season, he won his first La Liga and UEFA Champions League titles, scoring in the 2011 final. He left the club in 2013 after transferring to Atlético Madrid, where he won another La Liga title and reached the 2014 UEFA Champions League final. After a single season in the Spanish capital, Villa departed to join new Major League Soccer (MLS) franchise New York City, where he became the club's record goalscorer and appearance maker, winning the MLS MVP Award for best player in 2016. In 2018, Villa announced his departure from New York, to join Vissel Kobe in Japan before retiring in 2020.

Villa made his international debut for Spain in 2005. He participated in four major tournaments, and was an integral member of the Spain teams that won UEFA Euro 2008 and the 2010 FIFA World Cup. He scored three goals at the 2006 World Cup, was the top scorer at Euro 2008, and earned the Silver Boot at the 2010 World Cup. His displays for Spain and Valencia saw him named in the FIFPro World XI and UEFA Team of the Year for 2010. Having scored at the 2014 World Cup, Villa established himself as Spain's top scorer in World Cup history, with nine goals. He became the first Spanish player to ever reach 50 international goals and, after a brief comeback in 2017, he retired from the national team with 59 goals in 98 matches.

== Early life and youth career ==
Villa was born in Tuilla, a small parish in Langreo, Asturias, a region in northern Spain, the son of José Manuel Villa, a miner. When Villa was four, his chances of becoming a footballer were put in jeopardy when he suffered a fracture to the femur in his right leg, but he made a complete recovery. Due to the injury, he and his father worked on strengthening his left leg and Villa ultimately became ambidextrous. He recalls his father being consistently supportive: "He would be there throwing me the ball over and over, making me kick it with my left leg when my right was in plaster after breaking it, I was four. I can barely remember a single training session when my dad wasn't there. I have never been alone on a football pitch."

Villa admitted that he came close to giving up football at the age of 14 after growing disillusioned and falling out with his coach. However, thanks to his parents' encouragement, he persisted in pursuing his dream, realising his talent could earn him a living. "In those days I was a nobody, not earning a penny and after being made to sit on the bench all season I just wanted to get away and play with my friends" he said. "But my dad always supported me and cheered me up until my career turned round." He went on to begin his footballing career at UP Langreo and when he turned 17 he joined the Mareo football school.

== Club career ==
=== Sporting Gijón ===
Villa attracted interest from many Asturian teams, but one of the province's bigger teams, Real Oviedo, declared that he was too short and that they did not believe he had sufficient potential. He subsequently got his professional breakthrough at his local club Sporting de Gijón, following in the footsteps of his childhood idol Quini. Starting out at the team's youth ranks, he made his first-team debut in the 2000–01 season. After scoring 25 goals in two seasons, he became a first team regular. Pepe Acebal, Sporting's manager at the time, said that Villa initially lacked the stamina to have a real impact and had to be given his chance bit by bit and that Villa's capacity for work was "unrivalled".

"He had great technical qualities. His first touch was superb and, although you can never be sure someone will make it, you could tell he was talented. He makes very clever diagonal runs, breaking away from defenders, and he invariably made the right decisions. He is very intuitive."

— Pepe Acebal, former Sporting Gijón manager

=== Real Zaragoza ===
==== 2003–04 season ====
With his goal tally nearly reaching 40 goals after spending two full seasons in Sporting's main team, Villa got his chance in Spain's top-flight when Sporting were in financial difficulty – newly promoted Real Zaragoza signed him for approximately €3 million in the summer of 2003. The striker had no trouble adapting to playing at the higher level, netting 17 times in his first season at Zaragoza. His league debut came during Zaragoza's first La Liga game since his arrival, where the team were defeated 1–0 away by Galician side Deportivo de La Coruña while his first goal came two games later, an eighth-minute goal against Real Murcia which put Zaragoza 2–0 up in a match which ended 3–0. 4 December 2003 saw him net his first brace (two goals) in a 2–2 draw against Athletic Bilbao and on 25 April 2004, he scored his first hat-trick in a tight 4–4 draw against Sevilla which saw Villa score all four of Zaragoza's goals, putting his team ahead on two occasions.

Zaragoza reached the 2004 Copa del Rey final where he played a big part in the team's victory, scoring a crucial goal to put the Aragonese outfit 2–1 up against Real Madrid in a match which eventually ended 3–2. Soon after, he earned his first international call-up and cap, which resulted in Zaragoza fans becoming so proud of his achievements that they invented the football chant "illa illa illa, Villa maravilla", a play on the words "Villa" and "maravilla", the latter which translates to "marvel" but can also mean "wonderful" or "great" in that context.

==== 2004–05 season ====
After Zaragoza's triumph in the Copa del Rey, they were granted a place in the 2004–05 UEFA Cup; this was Villa's first time playing in a European competition. In the team's opening group game, against Utrecht, Villa netted a brace in the dying minutes of the game, which ended 2–0 in Zaragoza's favour. In the round of 16, Zaragoza faced Austria Wien. The first leg ended 1–1, while Villa scored in the second leg in an eventual 2–2 draw; Austria Wien progressed on the away goals rule. Meanwhile, in La Liga, Villa excited Zaragoza fans on 23 September 2004 by putting the team 1–0 up against Barcelona at the Camp Nou, although Barcelona came back to win the game 4–1. On 17 April 2005, Villa scored a brace which helped see off Sevilla in a 3–0 victory.

=== Valencia ===
==== 2005–06 season ====
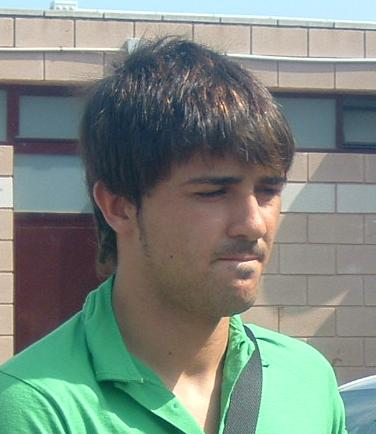
Villa at the Ciutat Esportiva de Paterna in 2005

After his success at Zaragoza, the team was in need of money; as a result, Villa made his big move to one of Spanish football's heavyweights, as a new look Valencia under Quique Sánchez Flores parted with €12 million to secure his services in the summer of 2005. During his first game in a Valencia shirt, an Intertoto Cup match against Belgian outfit Gent, Villa scored the first goal in a game which Valencia won 2–0. He made his league debut for Valencia coming on as a substitute against Real Betis in a 1–0 win on 27 August 2005. The next match would see his previous team, Zaragoza, leading 2–1 for the majority of the match; however, on the 81st minute, Villa came on as a late substitute for Rubén Baraja and scored the equalizer within the space of a minute, earning Valencia a point in a 2–2 draw.

On 21 September, Villa would once again save Valencia a vital point by netting a brace against Barcelona at Camp Nou, actually giving his team the lead at one point after Víctor Valdés' clearance rebounded off Villa's back and into the net. On 23 October, Villa scored the winning goal against another Spanish giant, this time Real Madrid at the Santiago Bernabéu Stadium, and would once again score against Barcelona on 12 February 2006, his one-goal proving enough to secure all three points in a 1–0 victory. Villa scored a goal against Deportivo La Coruña at the Riazor on 4 February 2006, later described as "superb" by ESPN and "his best" by Sid Lowe, who went on to credit it even more pointing out he achieved it "on the turn". Hitting the ball from the halfway line (50 yards out) it sailed over the keepers head and into the net.

Villa scored his first hat-trick for Valencia against Athletic Bilbao at San Mamés in La Liga on 23 April 2006. He managed the hat-trick in just over five minutes (80th to the 85th minute), making it one of the quickest hat-tricks ever recorded. Valencia won that game 3–0. That season saw him score 25 goals in 35 league matches for Valencia, finishing one goal behind the league's top scorer Samuel Eto'o of Barcelona. Villa's goal tally that year was the best that any Valencia player had ever achieved since Edmundo Suárez over 60 years prior.

==== 2006–07 season ====
Villa's form continued into the 2006–07 season, with the striker forming a partnership up front with former Real Madrid star Fernando Morientes. Between them, Villa and Morientes netted 43 goals in all competitions. That year also saw Villa debut in the UEFA Champions League; his first match was a qualifying match, coming on as a late substitute in a 1–0 first leg loss against Red Bull Salzburg. He went on to start the second leg and scored in a 3–0 win which saw Valencia qualify for the Champions League group stages. Crucial goals against Roma and Shakhtar Donetsk helped Valencia qualify for the knockout stages, where they faced Inter Milan. Villa scored a free-kick goal in the first leg away from home, while one of Inter's defenders complained that Villa had "made us look like idiots, all on his own". Valencia went through to the quarter-finals, where they faced Chelsea. Villa featured in both games but failed to make the score sheet as Valencia were knocked out by the London team 3–2 on aggregate. In October 2006, he was included among the 50 nominees for the Ballon d'Or (often referred to as the European Footballer of the Year Award).

A crucial goal against Espanyol and a brace against Sevilla helped him reach 16 goals that season and would see him come sixth in La Liga's top scorer list that season (scoring the same number of goals as fellow international Raúl Tamudo) while he created more assists than anyone.

==== 2007–08 season ====
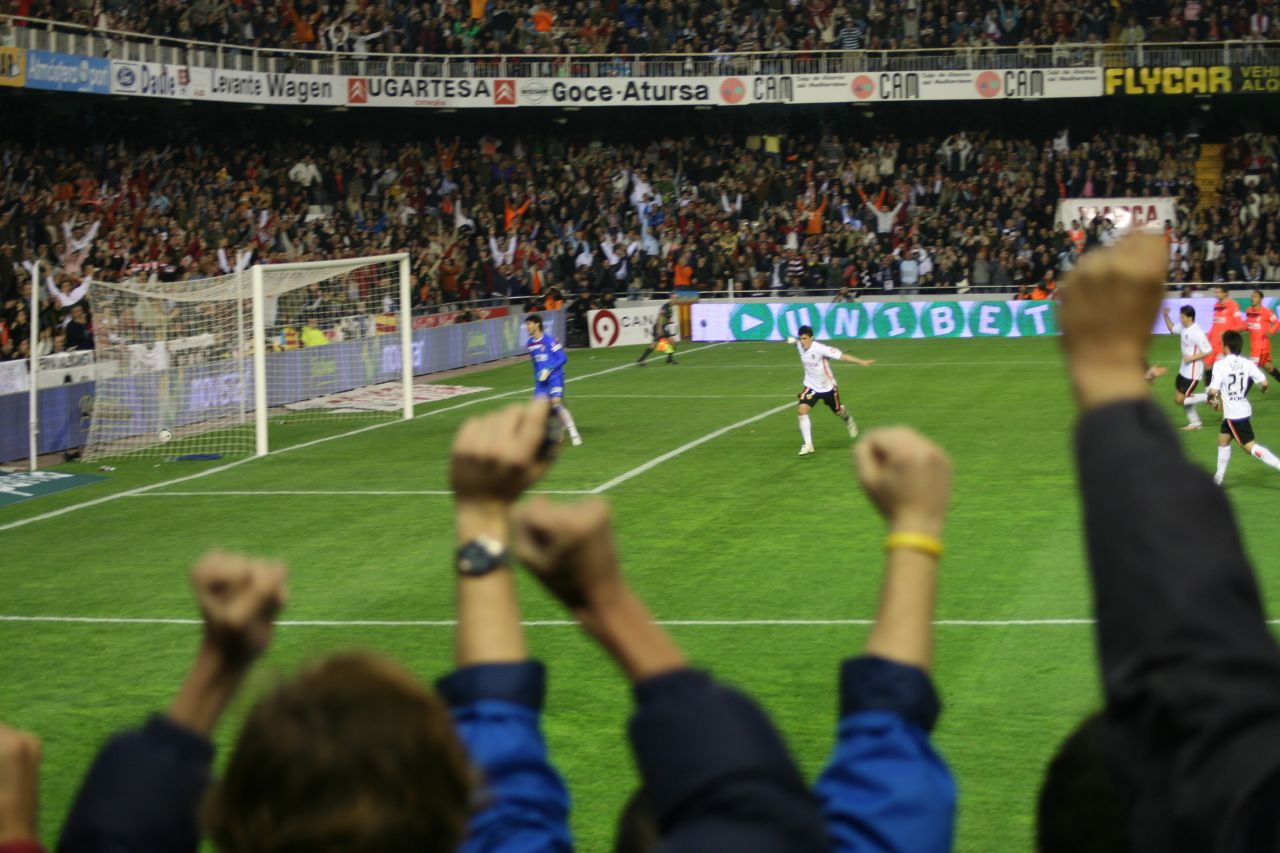
Villa after scoring a penalty against Sevilla in 2007

The 2007–08 season was not easy for Villa nor for his teammates. Early in the season, their manager, Quique Sánchez Flores, was fired and replaced by Ronald Koeman, who ended up being fired on 22 April, after a run of poor results, even though he managed to win a trophy with Valencia after the team defeated Getafe in the Copa del Rey-final. Koeman was replaced by highly rated Almería coach Unai Emery at the end of the season. Under Koeman, Villa managed to see the back of the net 18 times in his 26 appearances. He also won the first professional trophy of his Valencia spell, winning the Copa del Rey for the second time in his career, beating Barcelona 3–2 in the semi-finals and then Getafe 3–1 in the final. ensuring the team's place for the following season's UEFA Cup. By the end of the season, he signed a new six-year contract with Valencia, committing his future to the club until 2014.

That season, Villa once again saw himself playing Champions League football. He scored the only goal in a 1–0 win against Schalke 04 and went on to put Valencia 1–0 up against Chelsea, although goals from Joe Cole and Didier Drogba saw Valencia lose 2–1. Valencia finished bottom of the group and were knocked out. On his 100th league appearance for Valencia, Villa scored a hat-trick against Levante; his 54th, 55th and 56th league goals for the club. Another two goals on the final day of the season against Atlético Madrid completed his tally of 18 goals that season.

==== 2008–09 season ====
After finishing as the top scorer at Euro 2008, Villa continued his form into the 2008–09 season, where he scored the first goal in a 3–0 win against Mallorca in what was the opening game of the season. After failing to sign the player, Real Madrid's manager at the time, Bernd Schuster, accused Villa of having "no ambition", whereupon Villa responded by saying, "Footballing ambition is not about your mouth, it is about your feet. You can accuse me of lots of things – of having a bad day, of missing chances, of many things – but I have always had ambition and always will have. I think I have proved that on the pitch with Zaragoza, Sporting, UD Langreo, and the national team." In October 2008, Kaká praised Villa: speaking to Canal+, he claimed that Villa is "the best Spanish footballer" adding that, "The player with whom I would most like to play is David Villa of Valencia." On 2 December 2008, Villa came seventh in the 2008 Ballon d'Or rankings and on 12 January 2009, he was announced as the joint ninth-best player of 2008 alongside international teammate Andrés Iniesta of Barcelona, according to the 2008 FIFA World Player of the Year awards.

"David is an amazing player – he has mobility, he scores goals and is brave. I would love to have him in my team at Arsenal. He'd be amazing in the English league."

— Spain team-mate Cesc Fàbregas on David Villa

Valencia finished second in their UEFA Cup group, although Villa was not featured heavily and was often an unused or late-match substitute. He scored a late winner against Marítimo and was used in the Round of 32 against Dynamo Kyiv, though he did not make the score sheet. The two legs finished in a 3–3 aggregate score, with Dynamo progressing through the away goals rule.

Hitting a consistent goalscoring form during mid-season, Villa scored against Deportivo La Coruña, although he was sent off during the match after his second yellow card, received due to a foul on Daniel Aranzubia; as a result, he missed Valencia's next match against Real Valladolid, a game Valencia lost 2–1 at home. Ready to return from suspension, Villa suffered from an inflammation in the joint in his left knee due to a partial dislocation and would be ruled out for the next 15 days, missing games against Numancia, Recreativo de Huelva and Racing de Santander. When he finally returned from injury on 5 April 2009, he had no trouble recovering form, netting a brace in a match against Getafe which Valencia won 4–1. On 12 April, Villa was set to return to El Molinón, the home ground of Sporting de Gijón where he started his career. He admitted that the encounter would be very emotional for him but went on to score the second Valencia goal in a 3–2 win and kept a pre-match promise by not celebrating the goal. His goal against Villarreal brought his tally to 26, and he then scored another two against Athletic Bilbao, finishing with 28 goals after the last game of the season, thus equalling records set by the Argentinian Mario Kempes and the Montenegrin Predrag Mijatović, who also scored 28 goals in a Valencia shirt in 1978 and 1996, respectively. Kempes reached his tally of 28 goals in 34 games while Mijatović achieved it in 40, ultimately seeing Villa beat their percentages, as he achieved the 28 goals in 33 games, recording a goal ratio of 0.84 goals per game. That season saw Villa's best goal-scoring season at Valencia.

With the season over, Villa had marked his fourth year at Valencia, with only Barcelona's Samuel Eto'o scoring more goals than him in that period, with just six more. British columnist Sid Lowe, however, pointed out that Eto'o achieved this "in a team that racked up 129 [goals] more than Villa's side", and noted that "most of that time he [Villa] has taken Valencia's corners and free-kicks – and however good a player is he can't head in his own crosses". Villa also ended the season as the third top scorer in La Liga with 28 goals, just behind Eto'o (30) and Diego Forlán (32). After recording the best goal tally for a Valencia player in 60 years back in the 2005–06 season, he went three better in the 2008–09 season. The 28 league goals, in addition to three more in other competitions that season, accumulated a total of 101 goals in 180 official games with the Valencian outfit.

==== 2009–10 season ====
"David Villa is a phenomenon – the best in Europe"

— Quini, five-time Pichichi winner

After the shock exit from the Confederations Cup with Spain, Villa returned from his holidays on 27 July amidst much media speculation linking him with top clubs such as Real Madrid, Barcelona, Liverpool, Chelsea, and Manchester United. Villa quelled such rumours after announcing his desire to remain at the Mestalla to fulfil his contract, underlining that he "could not spend all summer refuting things, so I wanted to be quiet... I was told I should leave Valencia for the good of the club, soon after that everything changed and from that moment on I never saw myself out of here – before the Euros, the club told me what my asking price was, and I thought they were going to sell me, but when I returned from my vacations, Vicente Soriano said that he did not want me to leave Valencia. That removed all doubt for me. There is no train missed because all that I have achieved is because of Valencia and the Spanish national team." When questioned on whether or not he should apologise to Valencia fans, he simply replied, "I did not kill anyone, I do not think I have to ask for forgiveness."

On 20 August 2009, Villa scored in his first official match of the season, a 3–0 Europa League qualifier against Stabæk. He followed this up with two goals against Real Valladolid on 13 September, Villa's first league goals of the 2009–10 season. He scored twice more a week later against former club Sporting Gijón in a 2–2 draw at the Mestalla, where he also performed duties as the team's captain. After the match, Villa hinted towards being unhappy with Unai Emery's managerial decisions, stating, "The approach for the second half was not right. We relaxed and ended up with the same result as last year. What has happened, has happened, but their goalkeeper was good, unlike our approach, which was not good," however a day later he denied being critical of Emery, pointing out that, "When I talked about the approach, I was referring to the whole team, I spoke in the heat of the moment, I was annoyed at the way we lost two points and I said what I thought, but I have clarified everything that needed to be cleared up."

In 2009, Villa scored more goals than any other footballer, tallying 43 goals in 54 games across all competitions for both Spain and Valencia. The IFFHS listed him fourth in the "World's Top Goal Scorer 2009" rankings.

On 18 October, Villa was nominated for the Ballon d'Or, while nearly two weeks later, on 30 October, he was nominated for the FIFA World Player of the Year. After going three league games without scoring, Villa contributed two goals towards Valencia's 4–1 victory against Villarreal on 17 January 2010, the first of his two goals became his 100th league goal with Valencia. Another brace came against Getafe on 22 February 2010, the second goal being "a superb chip" (as described by ESPN) over Jordi Codina. On 18 March, Valencia went to the Weserstadion to play Werder Bremen in the Europa League. Villa scored a hat-trick, his third goal being of note, which was fired in from eight yards out. The match ended 4–4 while Valencia proceeded to the next round on away goals. On 4 May 2010, Valencia played Xerez; Villa did not start but came on as a substitute 62 minutes into the match, which ended 3–1. Valencia still had two more games to play in the league, although Villa did not feature, making the game against Xerez the last time he played for Valencia.

=== Barcelona ===
==== 2010–11 season ====
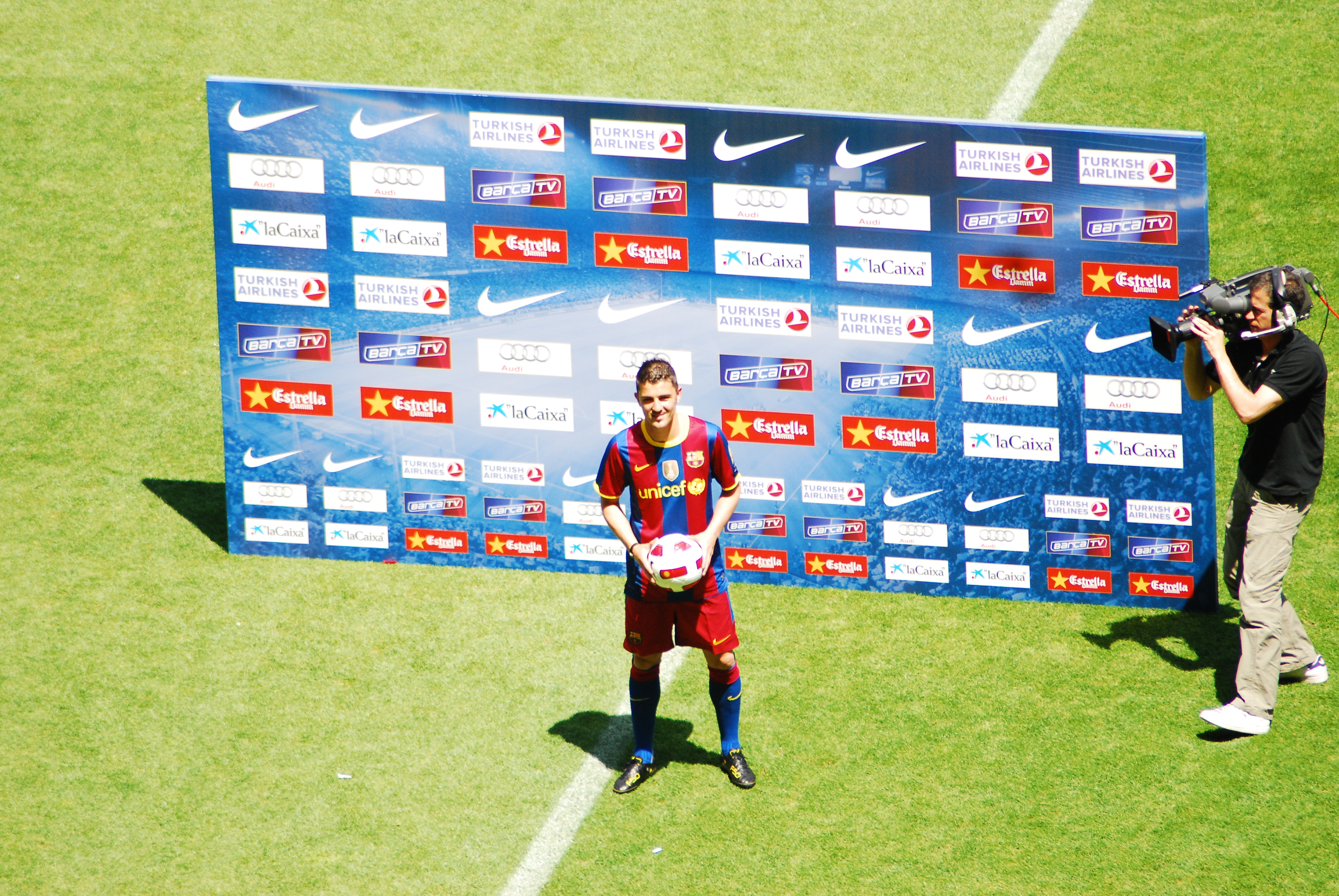
Villa during his presentation as a Barcelona player on 21 May 2010

On 19 May 2010, Barcelona reached an agreement with Valencia for the acquisition of Villa for a €40 million transfer fee. Villa signed a four-year contract with Barça with the option for a fifth, worth a reported €7 million per season, thus following in the footsteps of his heroes Luis Enrique and Quini, both of whom, like Villa, started out at Sporting Gijón and ended up at Barcelona. On 21 May 2010, over 35,000 Barcelona supporters packed into Camp Nou to see Villa's presentation, where he revealed the kit Barcelona would use during the 2010–11 season. He was given his favourite number 7, a number which had been free at the club since Eiður Guðjohnsen left in 2009. He made his first appearance for the club in the second leg of the Supercopa de España, during the second half as a substitute for fellow Spanish international Pedro. His debut appearance would also see him win his first piece of silver-ware with the Catalonian side, as Barcelona won 4–0 and 5–3 on aggregate due to a hat-trick by teammate Lionel Messi. His first goal came during the Joan Gamper Trophy (an annual friendly competition) against Milan; Barcelona won 3–1 on penalties after the match had ended 1–1 during normal time.

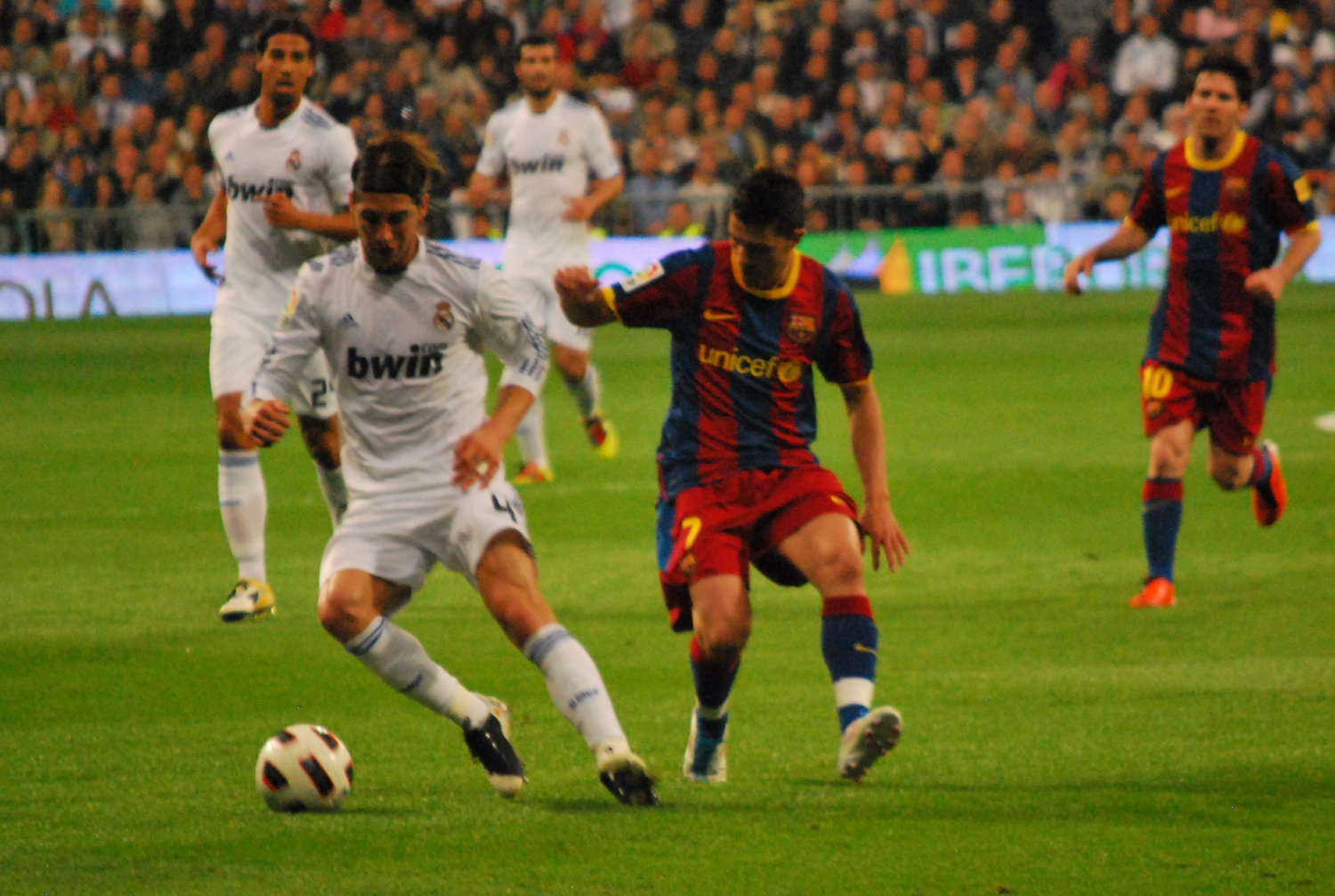
Villa challenging Sergio Ramos for the ball after scoring two goals in Barcelona's 5–0 victory over Real Madrid

On 29 August 2010, Villa made his La Liga debut with Barcelona against Racing de Santander, where he scored the third goal of the match to help seal a 3–0 victory. On 14 September 2010, he scored on his Champions League debut with Barcelona in a 5–1 victory over Panathinaikos.

Against Sevilla, on 31 October 2010, Barcelona won 5–0 against the Andalusian side, while Villa netted a brace. Villa's first El Clásico against Real Madrid came on 29 November 2010, where he scored two goals as Barcelona won 5–0 at the Camp Nou. Talking about the match, he commented that, "It's been a very important win. We looked for the victory and we got it. And the result and the manner in which we achieved it, you cannot ask for more." He then scored a goal against Real Sociedad, a match Barcelona won 5–0. He followed with a brace against Espanyol, helping Barcelona to a 5–1 win. On 28 May 2011, Villa scored the third goal – curling the ball into the net from 25-yards out – in Barcelona's 3–1 victory over Manchester United in the 2010–11 UEFA Champions League final.

==== 2011–12 season ====
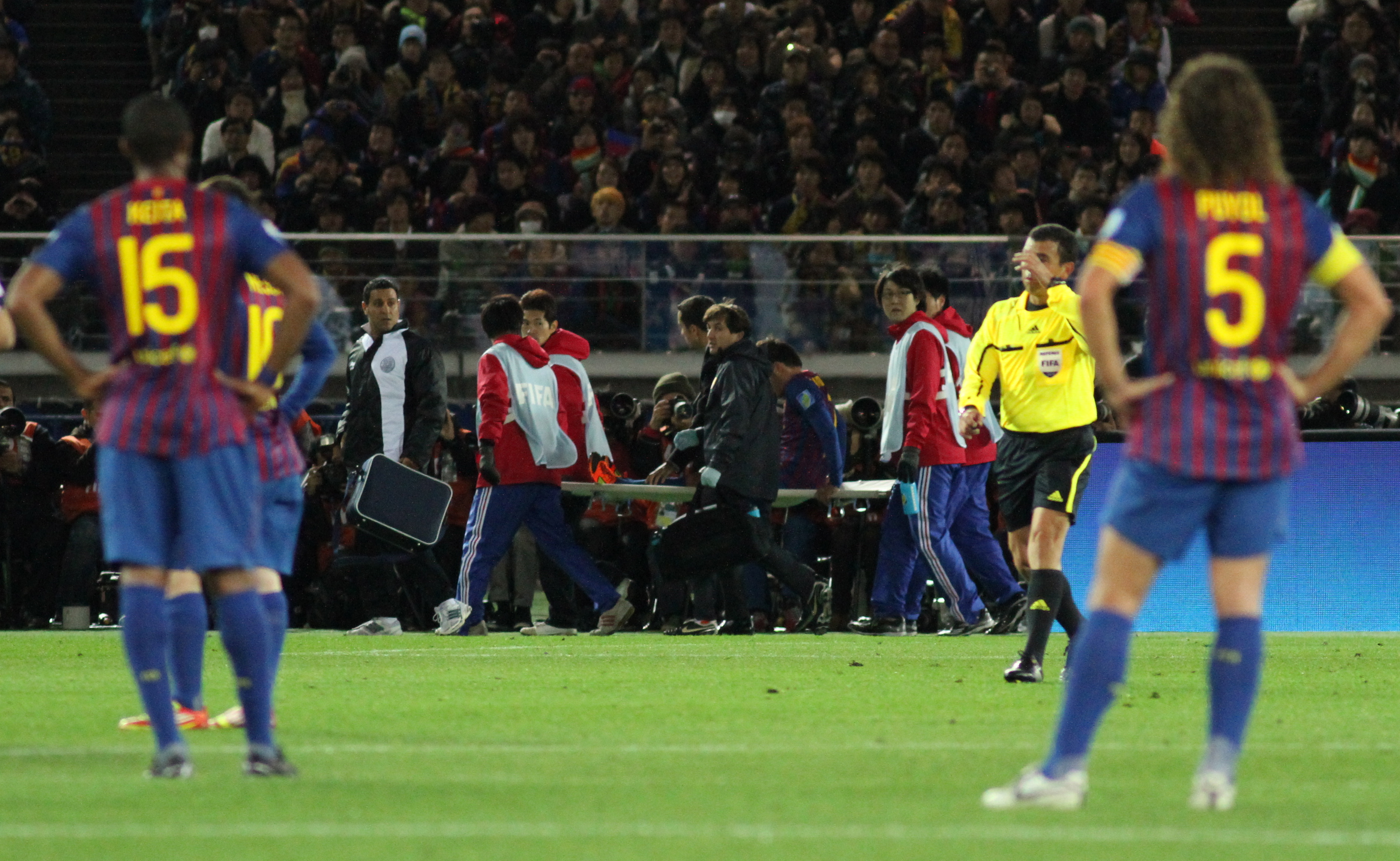
Villa's season comes to an end as he is carried off on a stretcher after breaking his tibia at the 2011 FIFA Club World Cup.

Villa started the season with goals against Mexican clubs Guadalajara and América in pre-season friendly matches. His first official match of the season was against Real Madrid in the first leg of the 2011 Supercopa de España, where Villa scored a "world-class" goal to help Barça seal a 2–2 draw at the Santiago Bernabéu, while on 17 August 2011, Villa was sent off in the dying moments of the second leg (which Barcelona won 3–2) after an altercation with Mesut Özil. Against Osasuna on 17 September 2011, Villa contributed two goals and forced Rovérsio into scoring an own goal in Barcelona's 8–0 win over the team from Pamplona. He then broke his tibia in a Club World Cup match in Yokohama against Al Sadd. Doctors said he was to be out of action for up to six months, but this eventually led to him missing the entire 2011–12 season with both Barcelona and the Spanish football team at Euro 2012.

==== 2012–13 season ====
After spending eight months without being able to play any football, Villa finally returned from his injury in the 73rd minute of Barcelona's 2–0 win over Dinamo Bucharest on 11 August 2012. Eight days later, he played his first competitive football match since December 2011 in Barcelona's first La Liga game of the season where he received a standing ovation while coming on as a substitute for Pedro. It only took seven minutes before Villa found himself on the score-sheet while sealing a 5–1 victory for his team against Real Sociedad. On 28 November, Villa scored two goals in a 3–1 over Deportivo Alavés, which included his 300th career goal.

Against A.C. Milan in the second leg of round of 16 of the Champions League, Villa scored the decisive third goal in Barcelona's 4–0 victory, helping his team overturn a two-goal first-leg deficit. In the next round, Villa assisted Pedro's equalising goal against Paris Saint-Germain which took Barcelona through to the semi-final, where they were eventually knocked out 7–0 on aggregate by Bayern Munich. David Villa ended the season with a large number of his appearances coming from the bench, partly due to the recovery time of his previous injury. Despite this, he was still able to amass 16 goals in 39 appearances while his performances earned him a spot in Spain's 2013 Confederations Cup squad.

=== Atlético Madrid ===
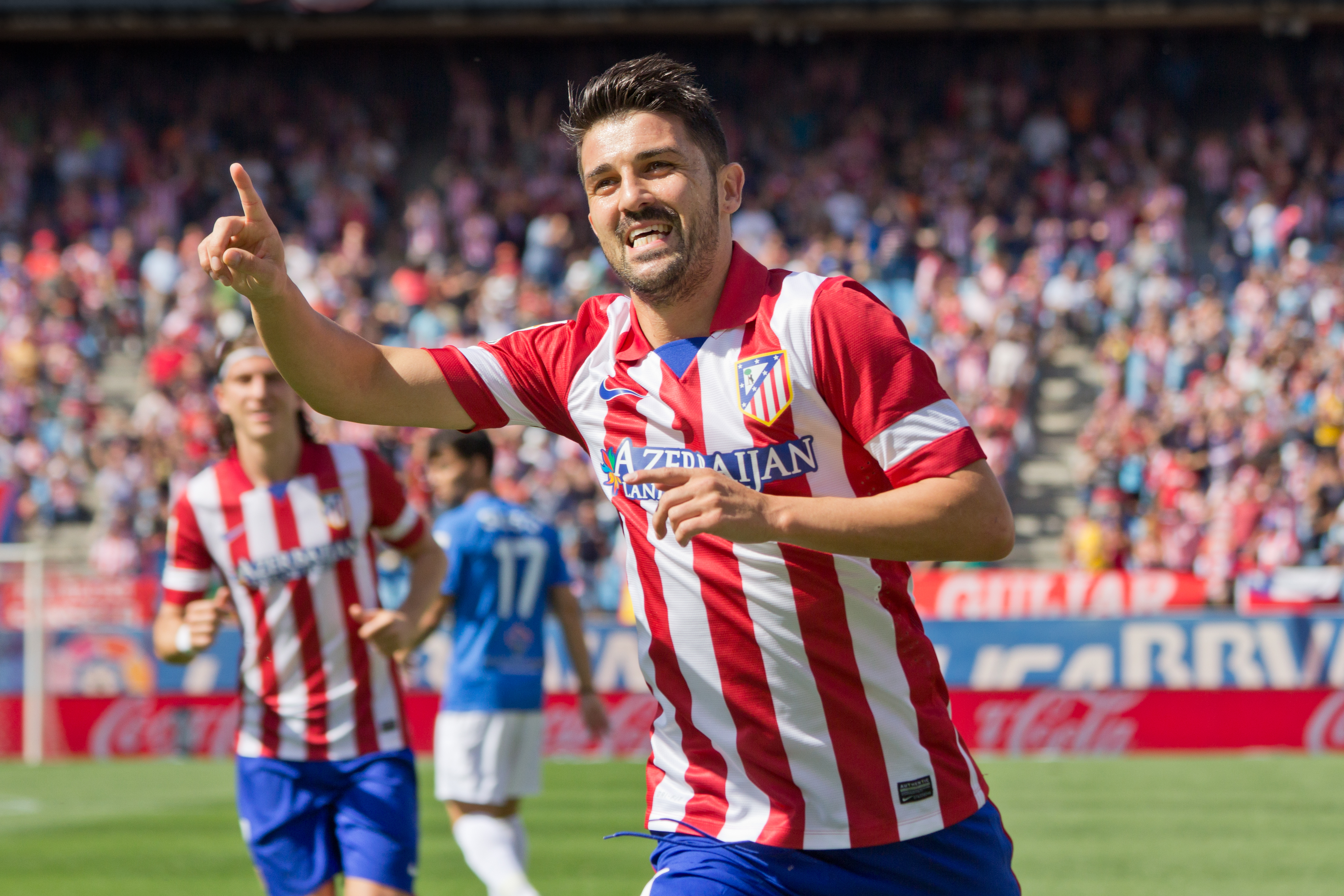
Villa playing for Atlético in 2013

On 8 July 2013, Barcelona announced that they had reached an agreement for the transfer of Villa to Atlético Madrid for a cut-price deal of €5.1 million. On 21 August 2013, he scored in the 2013 Supercopa de España first leg on his debut for Atlético against his former club Barcelona with a right-footed volley.

Villa scored his first goal of the league season on 1 September, also assisting Koke as Atlético won 2–1 away at Real Sociedad. On 27 October, he scored his first Atlético brace as the side defeated Real Betis 5–0 at the Vicente Calderón Stadium. He added two further braces during the season: on 23 November in a 7–0 win over Getafe and the other in the space of 90 seconds in a 2–0 away win against Celta de Vigo on 8 March 2014. He finished his only season at the club with 13 league goals from 36 appearances, contributing to Atlético's first league title since 1996 and also helping them reach the 2014 Champions League final, where they lost to Real Madrid.

=== New York City ===
On 1 June 2014, Villa announced that he would leave Atlético. While he called the club he was joining "an irresistible project", he did not reveal the identity of the club. The following day, he was announced as the first player for the newly formed New York City, who would start playing in the 2015 season of Major League Soccer (MLS). He was handed the number 7 shirt on arrival, and stated, "I want to try to help MLS continue to grow and try to make New York City become the best team in the league."

==== Melbourne City (loan) ====
Parallel to his joining New York City, Villa was announced to have joined the Australian A-League with Melbourne City, following the team's association with Manchester City. Villa was on a guest stint, allowing him to make up to ten appearances for Melbourne City during the 2014–15 season, taking advantage of the scheduling of the A-League and MLS to maintain match fitness ahead of his debut with New York City. After only joining Melbourne City for pre-season training just over a week before their first game, Villa was brought on in the 48th minute of the first game of the season against Sydney FC, and scored a debut goal a quarter of an hour into his appearance, after a cutback from Damien Duff. On 19 October 2014, in his second match, Villa scored an 87th-minute equaliser against the Newcastle Jets for a 1–1 draw.

Despite signing for ten matches, Villa was recalled by New York City after just four matches, none of which were won by Melbourne City; the last was a 1–2 home defeat to Adelaide United. It was estimated that he tripled the club's attendance, and manager John van 't Schip credited Villa with bringing attention to the club.

==== Return to New York City ====
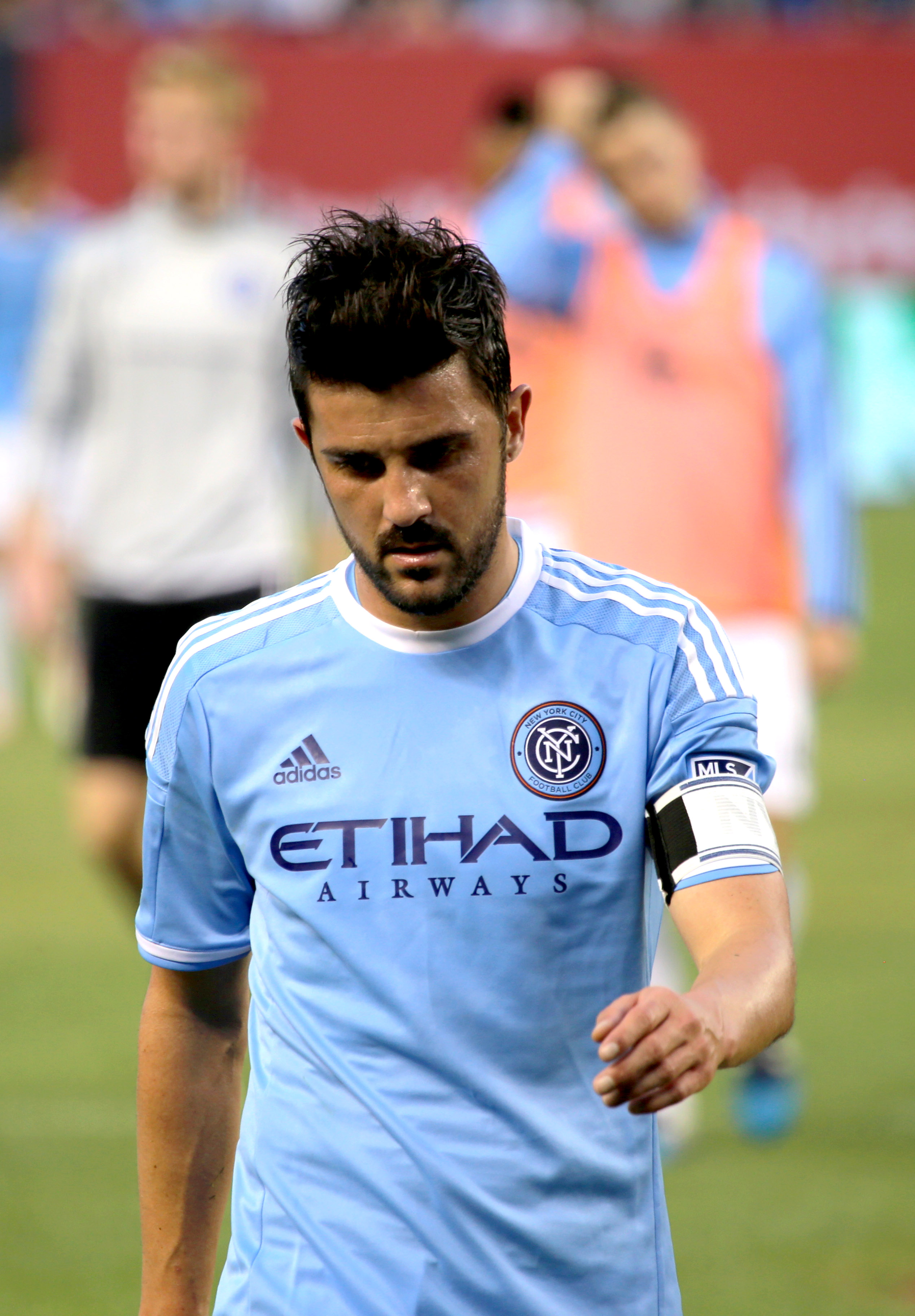
Villa with New York City in May 2015

Villa was named New York City's first ever team captain on 1 February 2015, as well as their first Designated Player. Nine days later, in a friendly against Scottish club St Mirren, he scored the team's first ever goal. On 8 March, he started in the team's first MLS game, away to fellow newcomers Orlando City. In a 1–1 draw, he set up Mix Diskerud for the first goal and was fouled by Aurélien Collin, who was sent off for the challenge. A week later, in their first home match at Yankee Stadium, Villa opened the scoring in a 2–0 win over the New England Revolution for the team's first competitive victory. On 12 July, Villa netted twice in a 4–4 home draw against Toronto, despite missing a penalty in the first half. He was selected to take part in the 2015 MLS All-Star Game on 29 July, at the Dick's Sporting Goods Park in Commerce City, Colorado; he scored the match-winning goal from a Kaká assist as the MLS All-Stars defeated Tottenham Hotspur 2–1. Despite Villa's prolific performances, which saw him score 18 goals during the 2015 MLS regular season, New York City did not qualify for the MLS Cup Playoffs in their inaugural campaign.

In July 2016, Villa was included in the roster for the 2016 MLS All-Star Game. Villa won the 2016 MLS MVP Award for the best player in the league. He scored 23 goals in the 2016 Major League Soccer season. Villa was chosen to start against former Clásico rivals Real Madrid in the 2017 MLS All-Star Game. He started on the right of a front three, alongside Jozy Altidore and Sebastian Giovinco. The game ended 1–1, Real winning 4–2 in a penalty shoot-out. Later, on 6 August, Villa scored his first MLS hat-trick in the Blues' 3–2 win over the New York Red Bulls in Yankee Stadium, taking him to 17 goals for the season and leading the goalscoring charts, surpassing Chicago Fire striker Nemanja Nikolić. At the end of the regular season, Villa ended up with 22 goals finishing second for top scorer award, two goals shy of Nemanja Nikolić. While New York City lost to Columbus Crew in Eastern Conference semifinals.

On 29 April 2018, Villa scored twice in a 3–1 win over Dallas. The goals were his 400 and 401st for club and country, and in doing so, Villa became one of the few players of the modern era to score more than 400 goals in their career.

=== Vissel Kobe ===
On 1 December 2018, Villa signed a contract for the 2019 season with J1 League club Vissel Kobe. Villa joined his former Barcelona and Spain teammate Andrés Iniesta. On 2 March, Villa scored his first goal in the J1 League in a 1–0 win over Sagan Tosu. On 13 November 2019, Villa announced that he would end his 19-year career and retire at the end of the 2019 J1 League season. On 7 December, he scored his final goal of his career from a penalty on the final matchday of the 2019 J1 League season, in a 4–1 win over Jubilo Iwata. On 1 January 2020, Villa played in the 2019 Emperor's Cup Final, coming on as a 92nd minute substitute. Vissel Kobe won the match against Kashima Antlers and he got his first silverware in Japan before retirement. Villa scored 13 goals during 28 J1 League matches.

== International career ==
=== 2006 World Cup ===
An occasional member of the Under-21 team, Villa marked his international début under Luis Aragonés on 9 February 2005 in a 2006 World Cup qualifier where Spain beat San Marino 5–0 at the Estadio del Mediterráneo while his first international goal came in the form of a late equaliser during a World Cup qualifier against Slovakia on 16 November.

A successful season with Valencia saw him get called up as part of the 23-man squad to represent Spain at the 2006 FIFA World Cup. Spain's first match at the tournament and Villa's World Cup debut resulted in a 4–0 win against Ukraine where Villa netted a brace, and also put his nation 1–0 up against France in the Round of 16, although Spain went on to lose the match 3–1. He and Fernando Torres finished as Spain's top scorers with three goals each.

=== Euro 2008 ===
"We complement each other very well. We get on well on the pitch and very well off it too. We're a good partnership. We both chase down defenders, put pressure on and fight to create chances for each other. We work well together."

— David Villa on Fernando Torres.

By the end of 2006, Villa had become an integral part of Luis Aragonés' plans and ousted Raúl from the team. Proving vital in Spain's qualification for Euro 2008, he scored six goals, including a bicycle kick against Liechtenstein. He was subsequently called up for the tournament where he formed a striking relationship with Torres, with whom he would often celebrate his goals. He scored a hat-trick in Spain's 4–1 win over Russia, making him the first player to do so at a UEFA European Championship since Patrick Kluivert in 2000, and only the seventh overall. After the third goal, he went out of his way to meet Torres, who was on the bench at the time, to celebrate with him: "I had just scored a hat-trick and I knew people would be talking about me, but I wanted them to see that I had benefited from Torres's work, just as he sometimes benefits from mine." In the next match, he secured a 2–1 win against Sweden with a goal in the 92nd minute. Rested for the next match against Greece, he started once again in the quarter-finals, where Spain beat Italy 4–2 on penalties; Villa took the first penalty and scored.

Reaching their first semi-final in 24 years, Spain went on to face Russia for the second time during the tournament, though during the early stages of the match, Villa sustained a thigh injury after taking a free kick and was replaced by Cesc Fàbregas. The injury meant that he could not participate in the final where Spain beat Germany 1–0 to claim their second win at the European Football Championships. Despite missing the final and the majority of the semi-final, Villa's four goals in the four games he played were enough for him to be top scorer of the tournament and was awarded the Golden Boot. He also made the UEFA Euro 2008 Team of the Tournament alongside striking partner Torres.

=== 2009 Confederations Cup ===
"I'd have David Villa over Kaká and Cristiano Ronaldo"

— Vicente del Bosque, Spain coach.

Spain's first match during qualification for the 2010 World Cup was against Bosnia and Herzegovina where Villa scored the only goal of the game. He would go on to score four goals in Spain's next three games, including a last minute winner against Belgium. Another goal during a friendly match against Chile saw him end the year with 12 goals, breaking Raúl's record of 10 goals held since 1999. Villa began 2009 with a goal against England in a 2–0 friendly, with this goal, he broke another record and became the first Spanish international to have scored in six consecutive games, seeing off records set by Telmo Zarra and László Kubala. Speaking of the goal, he said, "I am very happy with the goal. Truth is, I really want to see it on TV. The record is very nice. I would never have imagined in years that I would be able to obtain it. I am very proud and I hope I can continue breaking records."

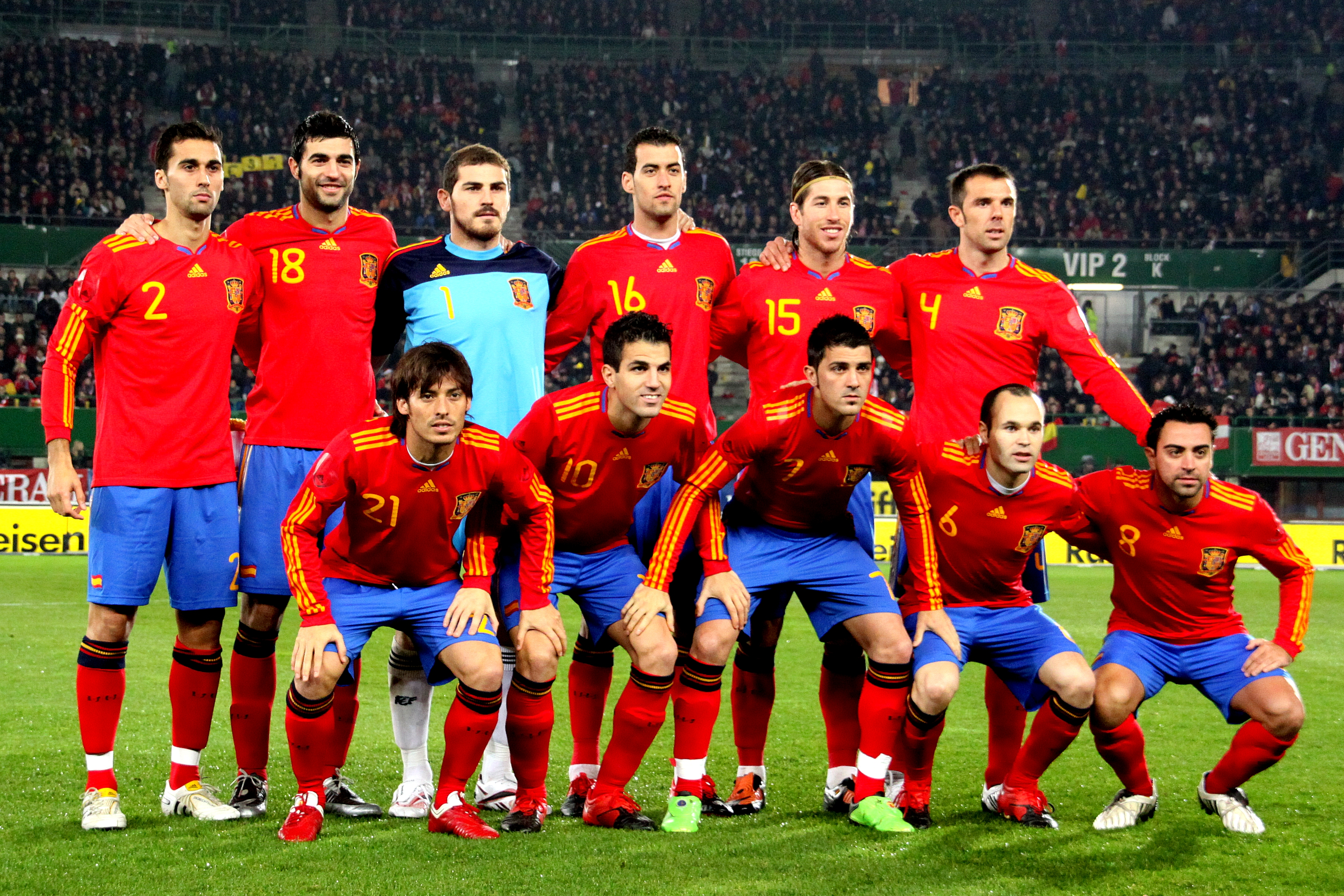
Villa (number 7) with the Spain team before a match against Austria

On 1 June 2009, Vicente del Bosque named Villa in his 23-man squad for the 2009 FIFA Confederations Cup. In a friendly match before the tournament, Villa scored his second international hat-trick against Azerbaijan, nearly exactly a year after his hat-trick against Russia at Euro 2008. He debuted at the Confederations Cup with a goal, the last of the five goals in Spain's 5–0 victory over New Zealand, while in the next game he scored the decisive goal against a defensive Iraqi team. Against South Africa, he missed a penalty, but within a minute made up for the miss by putting Spain ahead, helping them equal the records of most consecutive wins and most consecutive matches undefeated before making way for Pablo Hernández. The goal was his last of the tournament but was enough to see him win the 2009 FIFA Confederations Cup Bronze Shoe, he would also go on to make the team of the tournament.

Villa earned his 50th cap during a friendly against the Republic of Macedonia in a match where Spain won 3–2.

=== 2010 World Cup ===
On 5 September 2009, Villa added two more goals to his goal tally for Spain, while assisting twice during the World Cup qualifier against Belgium, in A Coruña. The match ended 5–0 to Spain, where Villa also had a first-half penalty saved by Belgian goalkeeper Jean-François Gillet. Villa finished the year with his sixth international brace against Austria in the Ernst-Happel-Stadion, the setting where Spain were crowned European champions the previous year. With these two goals, Villa equalled the record he set last year of most goals scored in one calendar year by a Spanish international. Spain's first match in 2010 came on 3 March, against France at the Stade de France; Villa scored the opening goal in a game which Spain went on to win 2–0.

In 2010, Villa came first in the IFFHS "2010's World Top Goalscorer at International Level" rankings, he was subsequently selected as a part of Vicente del Bosque's 23-man squad for the 2010 FIFA World Cup. In a friendly against Saudi Arabia on 29 May 2010, Villa scored the first of Spain's goals as they won 3–2 at the Tivoli Neu – the stadium where he scored his hat-trick against Russia during Euro 2008. Failing to score in Spain's next match against South Korea, he opened the score sheet in Spain's next match against Poland, in which Spain won 6–0, recording Poland's their worst defeat in 50 years.

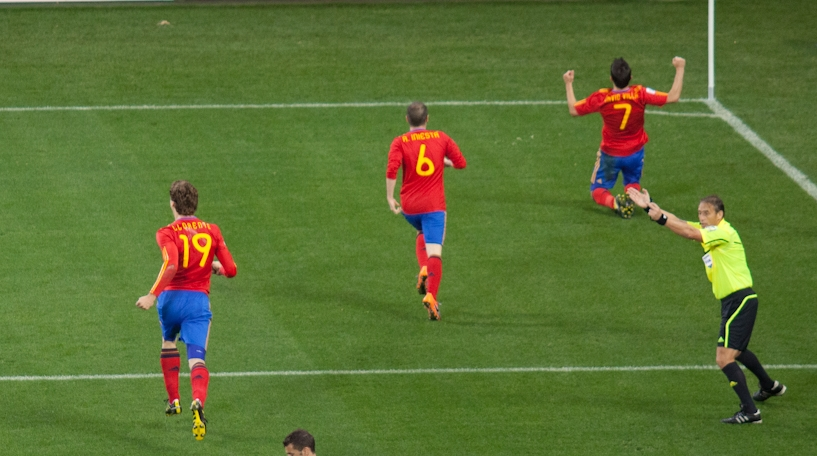
Villa celebrating his goal against Portugal along with teammates Fernando Llorente and Andrés Iniesta

In Spain's first 2010 World Cup match, Villa was chosen as a lone striker, but could do nothing to prevent their shock defeat at the hands of Switzerland. Five days later, Spain defeated Honduras 2–0, where Villa scored both goals, but wasted his chance to complete a hat-trick when he was awarded a penalty kick – side-footing the ball just wide of the post. It was the first time in 14 attempts Spain ever missed a penalty in a World Cup during the run of play. In the same game, Villa was shown to slap Emilio Izaguirre in the face after the Honduran player trod on him. Villa said he was "not proud" of the heat of the moment incident, but he escaped a ban. Villa helped secure Spain's place in the round of 16 after scoring the first goal in a 2–1 win over Chile, with a long-range shot into an empty net after Chilean goalkeeper Claudio Bravo ran out of his area to prevent Fernando Torres from scoring. The goal would become his sixth goal in FIFA World Cup matches, becoming Spain's all-time top scorer at the World Cup finals, ahead of Emilio Butragueño, Fernando Hierro, Fernando Morientes and Raúl, all of whom have five.

Spain were up against Portugal in the round of 16, and Villa would prove to be vital once again, as Xavi backheeled an Andrés Iniesta pass to the on-rushing Villa, who hit the back of the net on the rebound after having his first shot saved by Eduardo, proving enough to give Spain a place in the quarter-finals against Paraguay, where Villa scored a goal from a rebound after Pedro hit the post. Once again, Villa's goal proved to be the difference as the match finished 1–0, while Spain booked a game with Germany in the semi-finals, where Spain recorded yet another 1–0 victory with the only goal coming from Carles Puyol.

Villa started in the final against the Netherlands, where he had an opportunity to score from close range, but was impeded by John Heitinga who managed to block his shot; during regulation time, he managed five shots, none of which troubled the opposing goalkeeper, however. Villa was replaced by Fernando Torres in the 106th minute and Spain won the championship 1–0 on Iniesta's goal in the 116th minute. Villa, who scored five of Spain's eight goals in the World Cup Finals, and who was directly involved in a record 75% of the winning team's goals with his goals and an additional assist, was awarded the Silver Shoe; he had the same number of goals as Thomas Müller, the Gold Shoe winner, but fewer assists. Villa was named in the FIFA World Cup All-Star Team.

=== Euro 2012 qualifying and missing out on Euro 2012 ===
Spain's first match of UEFA Euro 2012 qualifying was against Liechtenstein on 3 September 2010, Villa scored the second goal of the match which eventually ended 4–0. It was believed that this goal meant that he had equalled Raúl's record 44-goal tally, however after many debates about whether he or Dariusz Dudka scored the first goal in Spain's 6–0 win over Poland, FIFA eventually decided that it was indeed an own goal by Dudka, meaning Villa's goal tally would remain at 43. On 12 October 2010, he finally equalled Raúl's record, scoring a penalty against Scotland and helping Spain see off the Scots in a 3–2 victory at Hampden Park.

On 25 March 2011, Villa scored two goals against the Czech Republic in a Euro 2012 qualifier, which ultimately handed Spain a 2–1 victory, while at the same time he managed to eclipse Raúl as Spain's all-time leading goalscorer. Speaking of the achievement, he stated that, "The goals are dedicated to all the team-mates, all the coaches, all partners and friends I had during my career... But long ago I promised José, who is a friend of mine, that the goal which overtook Raúl would be for him."

On 7 September 2011, Villa helped secure Spain's qualification for UEFA Euro 2012 by scoring two goals in Spain's 6–0 victory over Liechtenstein. In Spain's last Euro 2012 qualifying match, Villa scored his 50th international goal against Scotland in a 3–1 victory for Spain. That same match was also the first time Villa was able to wear the captain's armband while playing for the Spanish national team.

Villa finished as top scorer of Group I with seven goals, however, after fracturing his tibia in December 2011, he was left out of Spain's final squad for Euro 2012 after telling Vicente del Bosque that he would not be fit for the tournament. He tweeted, "I've tried, but I can't be 100% to play the Eurocup. I called Del Bosque. It's the honest thing." Del Bosque was hoping to include Villa in the squad and promised to give Villa as long as possible to return to fitness.

=== 2013 Confederations Cup and 2014 World Cup ===
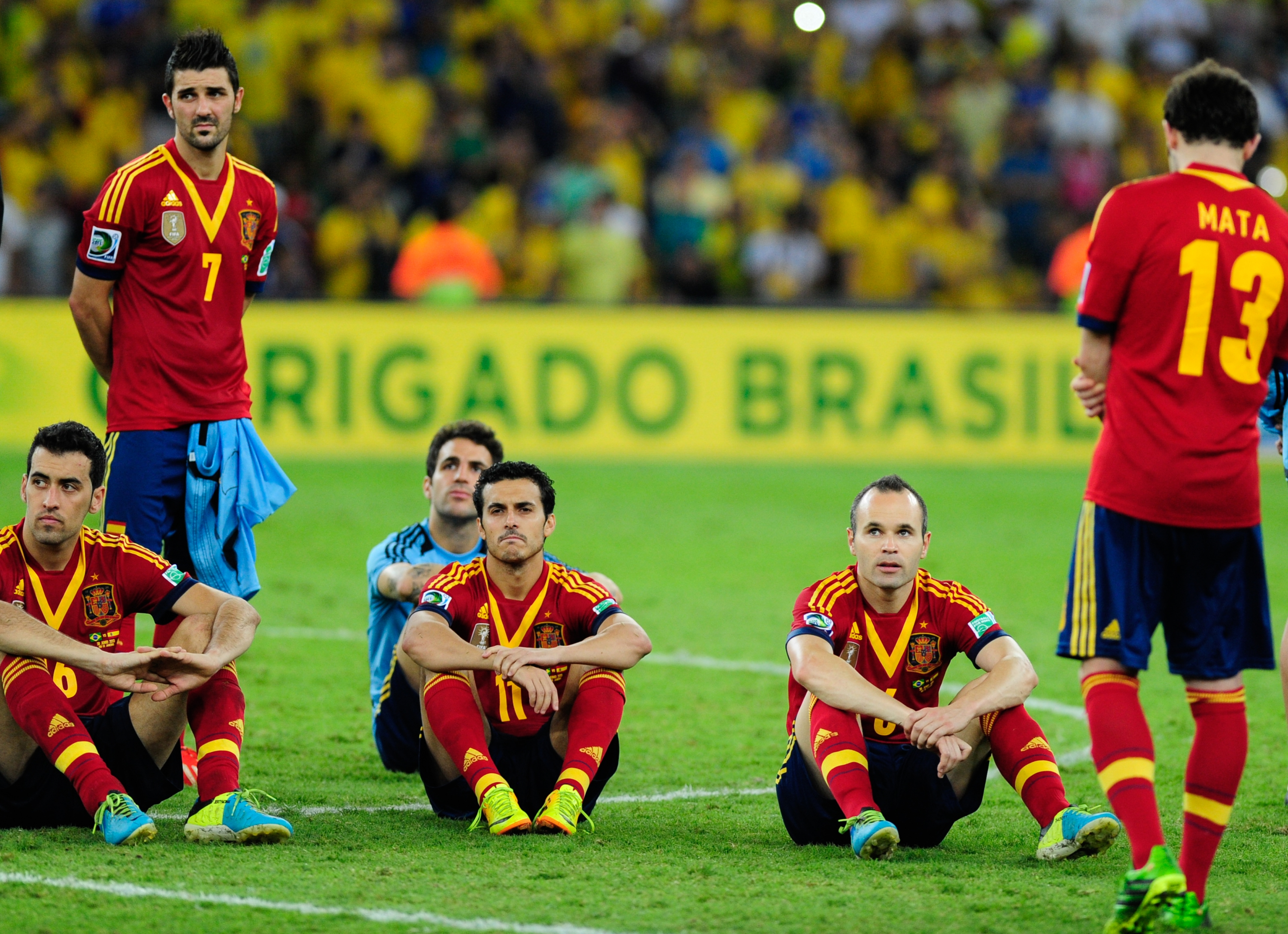
Villa and other Spanish players after losing the Confederations Cup final to Brazil

After Spain had won Euro 2012, Villa had returned to fitness and was subsequently called up to the Spain team again. He made his return in the 53rd minute during a friendly against Saudi Arabia and found himself on the score sheet just ten minutes later.

On 3 June 2013, Vicente del Bosque included Villa in his 23-man squad for the 2013 Confederations Cup where he scored three goals, all of which were against Tahiti in a 10–0 victory for Spain.

Villa was named in Spain's squad for the 2014 World Cup. Prior to the World Cup, he confirmed that he would retire from international football after the tournament. With Spain's elimination already confirmed, Villa was selected to start in Spain's final group match against Australia. He scored his 59th goal for La Furia Roja, and ninth in World Cup finals, in a 3–0 win on 23 June 2014.

In December 2015, Villa revealed that he was considering reversing his international retirement.

=== 2018 World Cup qualifying ===
On 25 August 2017, Villa was included in Spain's squad for the 2018 World Cup qualification matches against Italy and Liechtenstein, three years after originally retiring from international football. Ultimately, his final appearance for his country was against Italy, when he came on as a late substitute for goalscorer Isco. He would miss the match against Liechtenstein after suffering an adductor injury.

=== Succeeding Raúl as Spain's number 7 ===
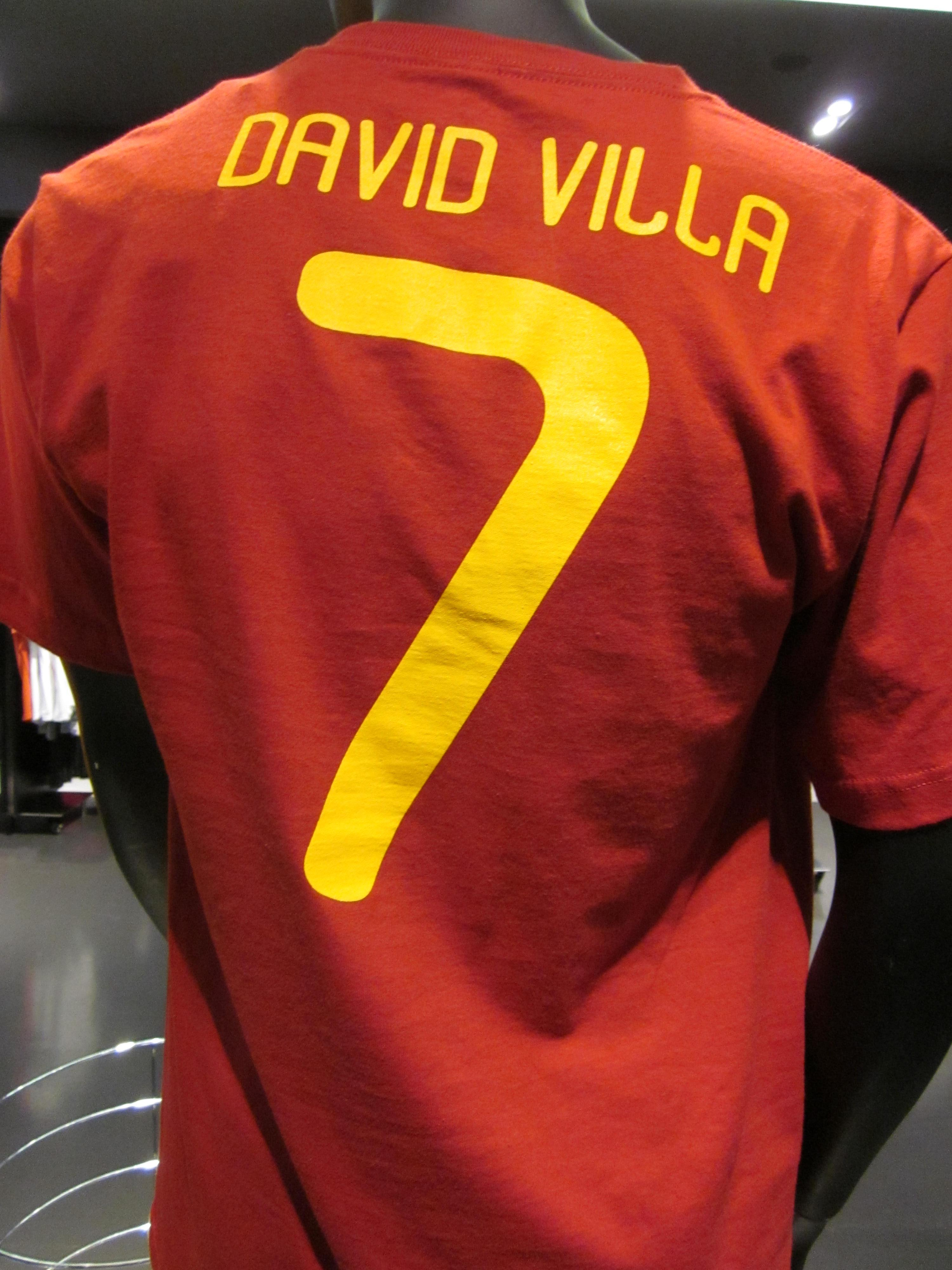
Villa succeeded Raúl as the number 7 for the Spanish national team

The Spanish media has often compared Villa with Raúl, to the point where Villa was accused of taking the number 7 jersey away from the then-Real Madrid player. In March 2009, Villa spoke out, saying,

"I have not taken anything away from anybody, I was simply playing well for my club and the national coach gave me an opportunity. Too much has been said about the number issue. I'm not looking to cause any controversy. In fact, Raúl and I were in the national squad together in the past. I haven't forced anybody out." When questioned on whether the whole uproar created over Raúl's omission was affecting him personally, he said, "I've never liked it because I think it has been damaging for the both of us. We've always got on well together whenever we've met up for international duty, so I'm not concerned. I just work hard for myself. All I want is to be in the squad for every game, to have the Spain badge on my chest and to score as many goals as I can."

In February 2010, Bernd Schuster was asked if Raúl did not favour Villa moving to Real Madrid, to which he responded, "I have a cough", which caused many to believe that he was implying the rumour to be true. Villa firmly ridiculed that idea by saying, "It is impossible that a player with as much class on and off the pitch as Raúl would speak poorly of me. I have always had a good relationship with Raúl, even though we have hardly met on international duty." Speaking about Raúl's record with the Spanish national team as the nation's leading top scorer, Villa said, "I've got 25 goals but he's got 44 and is still playing. I'd be delighted to reach that tally as I'd help the national team achieve great victories and, in many years' time, I could see my name on a [scorers' list] that another young lad was trying to beat. That would be great." On 25 March 2011, two years after making that remark, Villa surpassed Raúl as Spain's all-time top scorer.

== Post-playing career ==
On 13 November 2019, Villa announced that, once he retired, he would be investing as an owner of USL Championship side Queensboro, based in Queens, New York City, United States. The club would never get off the ground.

On 6 May 2021, Indian Super League club Odisha announced him as the head of Global Football Operations as well as member of the technical committee along with former coach Josep Gombau and Victor Onate ahead of the 2021–22 Indian Super League. Their role includes advising the coaching staff, improving the Indian and youth players, providing general support to the on-field activities among others. After joining the club, Villa said: "I will try to bring my experience. Obviously, I didn't play in India but I played soccer for 20 years as a professional and before that in the academy. And in all of the projects that we (my team) are involved in, I try to give all of my experience that I have in soccer."

On 28 March 2023, Villa's DV7 Group completed the purchase of Benidorm, playing in the regional divisions of the Valencian Community, where he was announced as the vice-president along with his business partner Víctor Oñate. The team was subsequently promoted to the 2024–25 Tercera Federación season (5th division in Spanish football).

== Style of play ==
"Villa is not only there to finish plays. Villa is synonymous with depth. It means always being ready to open passing lanes, to draw defenders and thus freeing space for others."

— Johan Cruyff, three time Ballon d'Or winner.

A prolific goalscorer, Villa is regarded by pundits as one of the best forwards of his generation, and one of the best Spanish strikers of all-time. An opportunistic, versatile and well-rounded player, Villa was naturally right-footed, but an accurate and powerful finisher with either foot, due to his ambidexterity, both inside and outside the area, despite his lack of height or physicality; he was also a set piece and penalty kick specialist. Villa was a quick, agile, and mobile team player, with excellent technique and dribbling skills, who was also known for his work-rate and intelligent offensive movement, as well as his ability to either create space for teammates or make attacking runs into the area. Due to his vision and passing ability, he was also capable of dropping deep to link up play with midfielders, and of creating chances and providing assists for teammates, which allowed him to be deployed as a supporting forward, as an attacking midfielder or as a winger throughout his career, in addition to his more common role as a centre-forward.

== Personal life ==
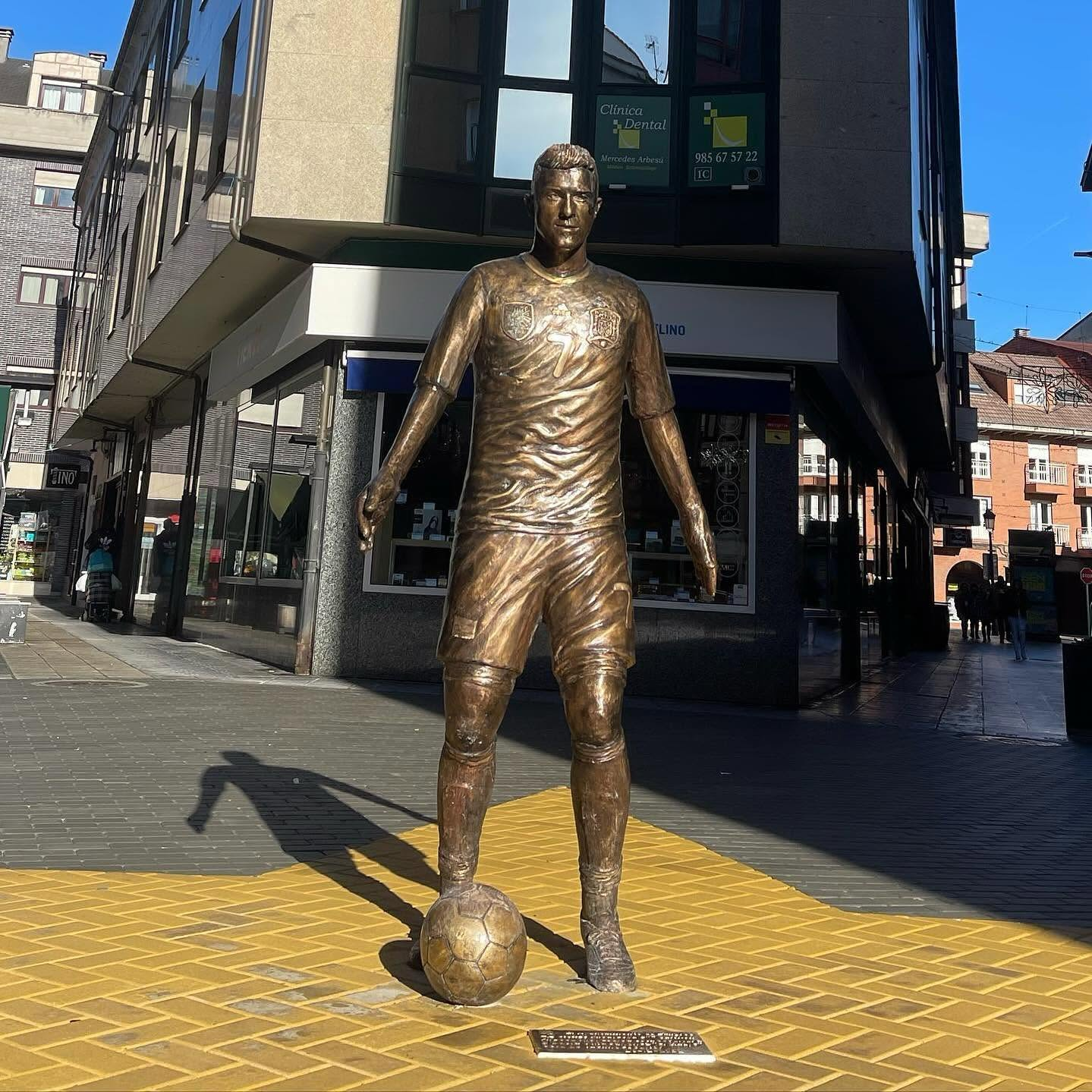
Life-size statue of David Villa in La Felguera-Langreo, Asturias, inaugurated in 2022

In 2003, Villa married his childhood sweetheart Patricia González, who had also been a footballer in her teenage years. Together they have three children. The names of his children are engraved on his personalised Adidas F50 boots; while one boot bears the Spanish flag, the other has the flag of Asturias. His footballing idols are fellow Asturians Luis Enrique and Quini, both of whom also played for Sporting de Gijón and Barcelona.

Villa frequently attends charity events. He is actively involved with the campaigns of the UNICEF charity. Beginning in July 2008, a David Villa Camp is held annually, where children receive training from professional footballers. Villa also participates in a training session with the children.

Villa features in EA Sports' FIFA video game series; he was on the cover of the Spanish edition of the video game FIFA 07, and he also appeared on the cover of the MLS custom edition of FIFA 16.

In 2010, Villa sang alongside Grammy Award-nominated Spanish singer Ana Torroja on the song "Insurrection" by El Último de la Fila. The recording was made for the beneficiary project Voces X1FIN to help raise money to build an art and education school in Mali. Villa commented that footballers "are an example for society and we have to be ready to get involved in these projects, where we can help people who need it".

In the summer of 2020, Villa was accused of sexual harassment that took place during his time at New York City FC. A subsequent investigation by the club found that "inappropriate and unacceptable" behavior took place, though Villa was not mentioned by name. Villa maintains the allegations are "totally false".

== Other ventures ==
Villa is the owner of DV7 Group, which has multiple companies including DV7 Soccer and DV7 Management. DV7 Soccer was founded in 2016 and manages multiple football academies around the world in countries like United States, Puerto Rico, Spain, Japan and Dominican Republic.

== Career statistics ==
=== Club ===
Appearances and goals by club, season and competition
Club	Season	League			Cup (Note: Includes Copa del Rey, Supercopa de España, U.S. Open Cup, MLS Cup Playoffs, Emperor's Cup and J.League Cup.)		Continental (Note: Includes UEFA Intertoto Cup, UEFA Cup, UEFA Champions League, UEFA Super Cup, FIFA Club World Cup, CONCACAF Champions League and AFC Champions League.)		Total	
Club	Season	Division	Apps	Goals	Apps	Goals	Apps	Goals	Apps	Goals
Sporting Gijón B	2000–01	Segunda División B	35	13	—		—		35	13
Sporting Gijón B	2001–02	Segunda División B	1	1	—		—		1	1
Sporting Gijón B	Total		36	14	—		—		36	14
Sporting Gijón	2000–01	Segunda División	1	0	—		—		1	0
Sporting Gijón	2001–02	Segunda División	40	18	4	2	—		44	20
Sporting Gijón	2002–03	Segunda División	39	20	1	1	—		40	21
Sporting Gijón	Total		80	38	5	3	—		85	41
Zaragoza	2003–04	La Liga	38	17	8	4	—		46	21
Zaragoza	2004–05	La Liga	35	15	3	0	10	3	48	18
Zaragoza	Total		73	32	11	4	10	3	94	39
Valencia	2005–06	La Liga	37	25	4	2	6	1	47	28
Valencia	2006–07	La Liga	36	16	2	0	11	5	49	21
Valencia	2007–08	La Liga	28	18	6	3	7	3	41	24
Valencia	2008–09	La Liga	33	28	5	2	5	1	43	31
Valencia	2009–10	La Liga	32	21	2	0	11	7	45	28
Valencia	Total		166	108	19	5	40	17	225	130
Barcelona	2010–11	La Liga	34	18	6	1	12	4	52	23
Barcelona	2011–12	La Liga	15	5	3	1	6	3	24	9
Barcelona	2012–13	La Liga	28	10	5	5	10	1	43	16
Barcelona	Total		77	33	14	7	28	8	119	48
Atlético Madrid	2013–14	La Liga	36	13	4	2	7	0	47	15
Melbourne City (loan)	2014–15	A-League	4	2	0	0	—		4	2
New York City FC	2015	MLS	30	18	0	0	—		30	18
New York City FC	2016	MLS	33	24	2	0	—		35	24
New York City FC	2017	MLS	31	24	3	0	—		34	24
New York City FC	2018	MLS	23	14	4	1	—		27	15
New York City FC	Total		117	77	9	3	—		126	80
Vissel Kobe	2019	J1 League	28	13	1	0	—		29	13
Career total			617	330	63	24	85	28	765	382

=== International ===
Appearances and goals by year and competition
Team	Year	Competitive		Friendly		Total	
Team	Year	Apps	Goals	Apps	Goals	Apps	Goals
Spain	2005	4 (Note: Appearances in the 2006 FIFA World Cup qualification)	1	0	0	4	1
Spain	2006	7 (Note: Four appearances and three goals in the 2006 FIFA World Cup, three appearances and three goals in the UEFA Euro 2008 qualifying)	6	7	2	14	8
Spain	2007	8 (Note: Appearances in the UEFA Euro 2008 qualifying)	3	2	0	10	3
Spain	2008	8 (Note: Four appearances and four goals at UEFA Euro 2008, four appearances and five goals in the 2010 FIFA World Cup qualification)	9	5	3	13	12
Spain	2009	8 (Note: Three appearances and two goals in the 2010 FIFA World Cup qualification, five appearances and three goals in the 2009 FIFA Confederations Cup)	5	5	6	13	11
Spain	2010	10 (Note: Seven appearances and five goals in the 2010 FIFA World Cup, three appearances and two goals in the UEFA Euro 2012 qualifying)	7	6	2	16	9
Spain	2011	5 (Note: Appearances in the UEFA Euro 2012 qualifying)	5	7	2	12	7
Spain	2012	1 (Note: Appearance in the 2014 FIFA World Cup qualification)	0	2	2	3	2
Spain	2013	6 (Note: Three appearances in the 2014 FIFA World Cup qualification, three appearances and three goals in the 2013 FIFA Confederations Cup)	3	4	0	10	3
Spain	2014	1 (Note: Appearance in the 2014 FIFA World Cup)	1	1	2	2	3
Spain	2015	0	0	0	0	0	0
Spain	2016	0	0	0	0	0	0
Spain	2017	1 (Note: Appearance in the 2018 FIFA World Cup qualification)	0	0	0	1	0
Total		59	40	39	19	98	59

== Honours ==
Zaragoza

- Copa del Rey: 2003–04
- Supercopa de España: 2004

Valencia

- Copa del Rey: 2007–08

Barcelona

- La Liga: 2010–11, 2012–13
- Copa del Rey: 2011–12
- Supercopa de España: 2010, 2011
- UEFA Champions League: 2010–11
- UEFA Super Cup: 2011
- FIFA Club World Cup: 2011

Atlético Madrid

- La Liga: 2013–14

Vissel Kobe

- Emperor's Cup: 2019

Spain

- FIFA World Cup: 2010
- UEFA European Championship: 2008

Individual

- FIFA FIFPro World11: 2010
- UEFA Team of the Year: 2010
- 2010 FIFA World Cup Silver Shoe
- 2010 FIFA World Cup Bronze Ball
- 2010 FIFA World Cup Dream Team
- 2010 FIFA World Cup Man of the Match: Spain vs Honduras
- UEFA Euro 2008 Golden Boot
- UEFA Euro 2008 Team of the Tournament
- UEFA Euro 2008 Man of the Match: Spain vs Russia, Spain vs Sweden
- 2009 FIFA Confederations Cup Bronze Shoe
- 2009 FIFA Confederations Cup Team of the Tournament.
- Spanish Player of the Year: 2005–06
- Zarra Trophy: 2005–06, 2006–07, 2008–09, 2009–10
- USSA Male Athlete of the Year: 2010
- MLS MVP Award: 2016
- Best MLS Player ESPY Award: 2017
- MLS Best XI: 2016, 2017
- MLS All-Star: 2015, 2016, 2017, 2018
- Ride of Fame: September 2015
- NYCFC Most Valuable Player: 2015, 2016, 2017
- NYCFC Goal of the Year: 2015
- NYCFC Offensive Player of the Year: 2016
- MLS Player of the Month: June 2017
- MLS Player of the Week 2015: Week 2, Week 15
- NYCFC Etihad Airways Player of the Month: July 2015, April 2016, September 2016, November 2017
- J1 League Goal of the Year: 2019

Achievements

- Valencia Top Scorer: 2005–06, 2006–07, 2007–08, 2008–09, 2009–10
- La Liga's Top Assisting Player: 2006–07
- Spain all-time top scorer: 59 goals
- Spain's all-time top scorer in FIFA World Cup matches: 9 goals
- New York City FC all-time top scorer: 80 goals
- Most goals scored in one World Cup (by a Spanish international): 5 in 2010
- Most goals scored in one calendar year (by a Spanish international): 12 (2008, 2009)
- Largest streak of games having scored (by a Spanish international): 6

Decorations

- Prince of Asturias Awards: 2010
- Gold Medal of the Royal Order of Sporting Merit: 2011
