= 2015 Emperor's Cup final =

2015 Emperor's Cup Final
Gamba Osaka	Urawa Reds
2	1
- Date: January 1, 2016
- Venue: Tokyo Stadium, Tokyo

2015 Emperor's Cup Final was the 95th final of the Emperor's Cup competition. The final was played at Tokyo Stadium in Tokyo on January 1, 2016. Gamba Osaka won the championship.

== Match details ==
January 1, 2016

Gamba Osaka	2–1	Urawa Reds
Patric 32', 53'	Report	Shinzo Koroki 36'

Tokyo Stadium

Gamba Osaka
GK	1	(Japan) Masaaki Higashiguchi
DF	14	(Japan) Koki Yonekura	(substituted off) 12'
DF	5	(Japan) Daiki Niwa
DF	6	(South Korea) Kim Jung-ya
DF	4	(Japan) Hiroki Fujiharu
MF	15	(Japan) Yasuyuki Konno
MF	7	(Japan) Yasuhito Endō
MF	13	(Japan) Hiroyuki Abe
MF	39	(Japan) Takashi Usami	(substituted off) 76'
MF	11	(Japan) Shu Kurata
FW	29	(Brazil) Patric	(substituted off) 88'
Substitutes:
GK	18	(Japan) Yosuke Fujigaya
DF	35	(Japan) Ryo Hatsuse
MF	10	(Japan) Takahiro Futagawa
MF	21	(Japan) Yosuke Ideguchi	(substituted on) 12'
MF	27	(Japan) Tatsuya Uchida	(substituted on) 76'
FW	9	(Brazil) Lins
FW	20	(Japan) Shun Nagasawa	(substituted on) 88'
Manager:
(Japan) Kenta Hasegawa

Urawa Reds
GK	1	(Japan) Shusaku Nishikawa
DF	46	(Japan) Ryota Moriwaki
DF	4	(Japan) Daisuke Nasu
DF	5	(Japan) Tomoaki Makino
MF	7	(Japan) Tsukasa Umesaki	(substituted off) 57'
MF	16	(Japan) Takuya Aoki
MF	22	(Japan) Yuki Abe
MF	3	(Japan) Tomoya Ugajin	(substituted off) 69'
MF	30	(Japan) Shinzo Koroki
MF	19	(Japan) Yuki Muto	(substituted off) 57'
FW	20	(Japan) Tadanari Lee
Substitutes:
GK	15	(Japan) Koki Otani
DF	2	(Japan) Kenichi Kaga
DF	27	(Japan) Rikiya Motegi
DF	33	(Japan) Wataru Hashimoto
MF	24	(Japan) Takahiro Sekine	(substituted on) 57'
FW	21	(Slovenia) Zlatan	(substituted on) 57'
FW	31	(Japan) Toshiyuki Takagi	(substituted on) 69'
Manager:
(Serbia) Petrović

== See also ==
- 2015 Emperor's Cup
