= 2000 Emperor's Cup final =

Japanese football cup final

2000 Emperor's Cup Final
Kashima Antlers	Shimizu S-Pulse
3	2
- Date: January 1, 2001
- Venue: National Stadium, Tokyo

2000 Emperor's Cup Final was the 80th final of the Emperor's Cup competition. The final was played at National Stadium in Tokyo on January 1, 2001. Kashima Antlers won the championship.

== Overview ==
Kashima Antlers won their 2nd title, by defeating Shimizu S-Pulse 3–2 with Mitsuo Ogasawara and Takayuki Suzuki goal.

== Match details ==
January 1, 2001

Kashima Antlers	3–2	Shimizu S-Pulse
Mitsuo Ogasawara 41', 92'; Takayuki Suzuki 49'		Oliva 45'; Teruyoshi Ito 81'

National Stadium

Kashima Antlers
GK	21	(Japan) Daijiro Takakuwa
DF	2	(Japan) Akira Narahashi
DF	3	(Japan) Yutaka Akita
DF	4	(Brazil) Fabiano
DF	26	(Japan) Yuichi Nemoto	(substituted off) 59'
MF	18	(Japan) Koji Kumagai
MF	5	(Japan) Kōji Nakata
MF	17	(Japan) Mitsuo Ogasawara
MF	10	(Brazil) Bismarck
FW	9	(Japan) Tomoyuki Hirase	(substituted off) 82'
FW	30	(Japan) Takayuki Suzuki
Substitutes:
GK	29	(Japan) Shinya Kato
DF	24	(Japan) Kenji Haneda
MF	6	(Japan) Yasuto Honda	(substituted on) 59'
MF	16	(Japan) Masashi Motoyama	(substituted on) 82'
FW	11	(Japan) Yoshiyuki Hasegawa
Manager:
(Brazil) Toninho Cerezo

Shimizu S-Pulse
GK	1	(Japan) Masanori Sanada
DF	2	(Japan) Toshihide Saito
DF	11	(Japan) Ryuzo Morioka
DF	4	(Japan) Kazuyuki Toda
MF	25	(Japan) Daisuke Ichikawa
MF	7	(Japan) Teruyoshi Ito
MF	5	(Brazil) Santos
MF	10	(Japan) Masaaki Sawanobori	(substituted off) 66'
MF	8	(Brazil) Alex
FW	17	(Japan) Takayuki Yokoyama
FW	12	(Argentina) Oliva
Substitutes:
GK	24	(Japan) Takaya Kurokawa
DF	3	(Japan) Takuma Koga
MF	13	(Japan) Kohei Hiramatsu	(substituted on) 66'
FW	9	(Japan) Sotaro Yasunaga
FW	15	(Japan) Yoshikiyo Kuboyama
Manager:
(Federal Republic of Yugoslavia) Zemunovic

== See also ==
- 2000 Emperor's Cup
