= 2006 Emperor's Cup final =

2006 Emperor's Cup Final
Urawa Reds	Gamba Osaka
1	0
- Date: January 1, 2007
- Venue: National Stadium, Tokyo

2006 Emperor's Cup Final was the 86th final of the Emperor's Cup competition. The final was played at National Stadium in Tokyo on January 1, 2007. Urawa Reds won the championship.

== Match details ==
January 1, 2007

Urawa Reds	1–0	Gamba Osaka
Yuichiro Nagai 87'

National Stadium

Urawa Reds
GK	23	(Japan) Ryota Tsuzuki
DF	3	(Japan) Hajime Hosogai
DF	19	(Japan) Hideki Uchidate
DF	5	(Brazil) Nene
MF	14	(Japan) Tadaaki Hirakawa	(substituted off) 62'
MF	13	(Japan) Keita Suzuki	(substituted off) 88'
MF	18	(Japan) Shinji Ono	(substituted off) 76'
MF	16	(Japan) Takahito Soma
MF	6	(Japan) Nobuhisa Yamada
FW	10	(Brazil) Ponte
FW	9	(Japan) Yuichiro Nagai
Substitutes:
GK	1	(Japan) Norihiro Yamagishi
DF	20	(Japan) Satoshi Horinouchi	(substituted on) 88'
DF	36	(Japan) Shunsuke Tsutsumi
MF	17	(Japan) Makoto Hasebe	(substituted on) 62'
MF	30	(Japan) Masayuki Okano	(substituted on) 76'
MF	34	(Argentina) Escudero
FW	12	(Japan) Teruaki Kurobe
Manager:
(Germany) Buchwald

Gamba Osaka
GK	1	(Japan) Naoki Matsuyo
DF	4	(Japan) Noritada Saneyoshi
DF	5	(Japan) Tsuneyasu Miyamoto
DF	6	(Japan) Satoshi Yamaguchi
MF	21	(Japan) Akira Kaji
MF	17	(Japan) Tomokazu Myojin
MF	7	(Japan) Yasuhito Endō
MF	14	(Japan) Akihiro Ienaga
MF	10	(Japan) Takahiro Futagawa
FW	11	(Japan) Ryūji Bando
FW	9	(Brazil) Magno Alves
Substitutes:
GK	22	(Japan) Yosuke Fujigaya
DF	2	(Brazil) Sidiclei
DF	3	(Japan) Toru Irie
MF	20	(Japan) Shinichi Terada
MF	27	(Japan) Hideo Hashimoto
FW	16	(Japan) Masafumi Maeda
FW	19	(Japan) Satoshi Nakayama
Manager:
(Japan) Akira Nishino

== See also ==
- 2006 Emperor's Cup
