= 2013 Emperor's Cup final =

2013 Emperor's Cup Final
Yokohama F. Marinos	Sanfrecce Hiroshima
2	0
- Date: January 1, 2014
- Venue: National Stadium, Tokyo

2013 Emperor's Cup Final was the 93rd final of the Emperor's Cup competition. The final was played at National Stadium in Tokyo on January 1, 2014. Yokohama F. Marinos won the championship.

== Match details ==
January 1, 2014

Yokohama F. Marinos	2–0	Sanfrecce Hiroshima
Manabu Saitō 17'; Yuji Nakazawa 21'	Report

National Stadium

Yokohama F. Marinos
GK	1	(Japan) Tetsuya Enomoto
DF	13	(Japan) Yuzo Kobayashi	(substituted off) 90+2'
DF	4	(Japan) Yuzo Kurihara
DF	22	(Japan) Yuji Nakazawa
DF	5	(Brazil) Dutra
MF	8	(Japan) Kosuke Nakamachi
MF	27	(Japan) Seitaro Tomisawa
MF	7	(Japan) Shingo Hyodo
MF	25	(Japan) Shunsuke Nakamura
MF	11	(Japan) Manabu Saitō	(substituted off) 84'
FW	17	(Japan) Jin Hanato	(substituted off) 88'
Substitutes:
GK	30	(Japan) Yuji Rokutan
DF	15	(Brazil) Fabio
DF	24	(Japan) Yuta Narawa	(substituted on) 84'
MF	2	(Japan) Takashi Amano
MF	6	(Japan) Shohei Ogura	(substituted on) 90+2'
MF	14	(Japan) Andrew Kumagai
MF	20	(Japan) Yuhei Sato	(substituted on) 88'
Manager:
(Japan) Yasuhiro Higuchi

Sanfrecce Hiroshima
GK	1	(Japan) Shusaku Nishikawa
DF	33	(Japan) Tsukasa Shiotani
DF	5	(Japan) Kazuhiko Chiba
DF	4	(Japan) Hiroki Mizumoto
MF	14	(Croatia) Mihael Mikić
MF	6	(Japan) Toshihiro Aoyama
MF	8	(Japan) Kazuyuki Morisaki
MF	2	(South Korea) Hwang Seok-ho	(substituted off) 46'
MF	9	(Japan) Naoki Ishihara
MF	10	(Japan) Yojiro Takahagi	(substituted off) 78'
FW	11	(Japan) Hisato Sato	(substituted off) 78'
Substitutes:
GK	13	(Japan) Takuya Masuda
MF	35	(Japan) Koji Nakajima
MF	15	(Japan) Tomotaka Okamoto
MF	17	(South Korea) Park Hyung-jin
MF	27	(Japan) Kohei Shimizu	(substituted on) 46'
MF	24	(Japan) Gakuto Notsuda	(substituted on) 78'
FW	29	(Japan) Takuma Asano	(substituted on) 78'
Manager:
(Japan) Hajime Moriyasu

== See also ==
- 2013 Emperor's Cup
