= 2012 Emperor's Cup final =

2012 Emperor's Cup Final
Kashiwa Reysol	Gamba Osaka
1	0
- Date: January 1, 2013
- Venue: National Stadium, Tokyo

2012 Emperor's Cup Final was the 92nd final of the Emperor's Cup competition. The final was played at National Stadium in Tokyo on January 1, 2013. Kashiwa Reysol won the championship.

== Match details ==
January 1, 2013

Kashiwa Reysol	1–0	Gamba Osaka
Hirofumi Watanabe 35'	Report

National Stadium

Kashiwa Reysol
GK	21	(Japan) Takanori Sugeno
DF	6	(Japan) Daisuke Nasu
DF	5	(Japan) Tatsuya Masushima
DF	23	(Japan) Hirofumi Watanabe
DF	22	(Japan) Wataru Hashimoto
MF	10	(Brazil) Leandro Domingues
MF	20	(Japan) Akimi Barada
MF	29	(Japan) Koki Mizuno	(substituted off) 32'
MF	7	(Japan) Hidekazu Otani	(substituted off) 67'
MF	15	(Brazil) Jorge Wagner
FW	8	(Japan) Masakatsu Sawa
Substitutes:
GK	1	(Japan) Kazushige Kirihata
DF	26	(Japan) Ryoji Fukui
DF	27	(Japan) Masato Fujita
MF	17	(North Korea) An Yong-hak
MF	28	(Japan) Ryoichi Kurisawa	(substituted on) 67'
MF	30	(Japan) Ryosuke Yamanaka
FW	18	(Japan) Junya Tanaka	(substituted on) 32'
Manager:
(Brazil) Nelsinho

Gamba Osaka
GK	22	(Japan) Yohei Takeda
DF	4	(Japan) Hiroki Fujiharu
DF	5	(Japan) Daiki Niwa	(substituted off) 85'
DF	13	(Japan) Keisuke Iwashita
DF	15	(Japan) Yasuyuki Konno
DF	21	(Japan) Akira Kaji
MF	7	(Japan) Yasuhito Endō
MF	10	(Japan) Takahiro Futagawa	(substituted off) 69'
MF	14	(Japan) Shu Kurata	(substituted off) 55'
MF	17	(Japan) Tomokazu Myojin
FW	9	(Brazil) Leandro
Substitutes:
GK	29	(Japan) Atsushi Kimura
MF	6	(Japan) Shigeru Yokotani
MF	8	(Japan) Hayato Sasaki	(substituted on) 69'
MF	23	(Japan) Takuya Takei	(substituted on) 85'
MF	25	(Japan) Hiroyuki Abe
MF	41	(Japan) Akihiro Ienaga	(substituted on) 55'
FW	11	(Brazil) Paulinho
Manager:
(Japan) Masanobu Matsunami

== See also ==
- 2012 Emperor's Cup
