= 2016 Emperor's Cup final =

2016 Emperor's Cup Final
Kashima Antlers	Kawasaki Frontale
2	1
- Date: January 1, 2017
- Venue: Suita City Football Stadium, Osaka

2016 Emperor's Cup Final was the 96th final of the Emperor's Cup competition. The final was played at Suita City Football Stadium in Osaka on January 1, 2017. Kashima Antlers won the championship.

== Match details ==
January 1, 2017

Kashima Antlers	2–1	Kawasaki Frontale
Shuto Yamamoto 42'; Fabricio 94'	Report	Yū Kobayashi 54'

Suita City Football Stadium

Kashima Antlers
GK	21	(Japan) Hitoshi Sogahata
DF	22	(Japan) Daigo Nishi
DF	23	(Japan) Naomichi Ueda
DF	3	(Japan) Gen Shoji
DF	16	(Japan) Shuto Yamamoto	(substituted off) 46'
MF	6	(Japan) Ryota Nagaki
MF	40	(Japan) Mitsuo Ogasawara	(substituted off) 88'
MF	25	(Japan) Yasushi Endo
MF	10	(Japan) Gaku Shibasaki
FW	8	(Japan) Shoma Doi
FW	18	(Japan) Shuhei Akasaki	(substituted off) 67'
Substitutes:
GK	1	(Japan) Masatoshi Kushibiki
DF	14	(South Korea) Hwang Seok-ho	(substituted on) 46'
DF	24	(Japan) Yukitoshi Ito
MF	11	(Brazil) Fabricio	(substituted on) 88'
MF	13	(Japan) Atsutaka Nakamura
MF	20	(Japan) Kento Misao
FW	34	(Japan) Yuma Suzuki	(substituted on) 67'
Manager:
(Japan) Masatada Ishii

Kawasaki Frontale
GK	1	(South Korea) Jung Sung-ryong
DF	6	(Japan) Yusuke Tasaka	(substituted off) 98'
DF	5	(Japan) Shogo Taniguchi
DF	23	(Brazil) Eduardo
DF	20	(Japan) Shintaro Kurumaya
MF	10	(Japan) Ryota Oshima	(substituted off) 91'
MF	14	(Japan) Kengo Nakamura
MF	18	(Brazil) Elsinho
MF	2	(Japan) Kyohei Noborizato	(substituted off) 46'
FW	11	(Japan) Yū Kobayashi
FW	13	(Japan) Yoshito Ōkubo
Substitutes:
GK	30	(Japan) Shota Arai
DF	28	(Japan) Ko Itakura
MF	19	(Japan) Kentaro Moriya	(substituted on) 98'
MF	22	(Japan) Yoshihiro Nakano
MF	26	(Japan) Koji Miyoshi	(substituted on) 46'
FW	9	(Japan) Takayuki Morimoto	(substituted on) 91'
FW	27	(Japan) Shohei Otsuka
Manager:
(Japan) Yahiro Kazama

== See also ==
- 2016 Emperor's Cup
