= 2023 Oita Trinita season =

Oita Trinita
2023 season
- Chairman: Masakaze Ozawa
- Manager: Takahiro Shimotaira
- Stadium: Resonac Dome Oita
- J2 League: 10th
- Emperor's Cup: Second round
- Top goalscorer: League: Hiroto Nakagawa (4); All: Hiroto Nakagawa (4)
- Average home league attendance: 10,119
- Biggest defeat: Montedio Yamagata 5–0 Oita Trinita
Home colours	Away colours
- All statistics correct as of 17 May 2023.

The 2023 season was Oita Trinita's 29th season in existence and the club's second consecutive season in the second division of Japanese football. In addition to the domestic league, Oita Trinita participated in this season's edition of the Emperor's Cup.

== Players ==
=== First-team squad ===
As of 5 March 2023.

Note: Flags indicate national team as defined under FIFA eligibility rules; some limited exceptions apply. Players may hold more than one non-FIFA nationality.

No.	Pos.	Nation	Player
1	GK	JPN	Shun Takagi
2	DF	JPN	Yuki Kagawa
3	DF	BRA	Derlan
4	DF	JPN	Keisuke Saka
5	MF	JPN	Hiroto Nakagawa
6	MF	JPN	Masaki Yumiba
7	MF	JPN	Tsukasa Umesaki (captain)
8	MF	JPN	Yamato Machida
9	FW	BRA	Samuel
10	MF	JPN	Naoki Nomura
11	FW	JPN	Arata Watanabe
13	FW	JPN	Kohei Isa
14	MF	JPN	Ren Ikeda
15	FW	JPN	Yusei Yashiki
16	MF	JPN	Taira Shige
17	MF	JPN	Keita Takahata
18	FW	JPN	Kazuki Fujimoto
19	DF	JPN	Katsunori Ueebisu

No.	Pos.	Nation	Player
20	FW	JPN	Shun Nagasawa
22	GK	JPN	Yoshiaki Arai
23	GK	BRA	Teixeira (on loan from Bahia)
24	GK	JPN	Konosuke Nishikawa
25	DF	JPN	Tomoya Ando
26	MF	JPN	Kenshin Yasuda
27	DF	JPN	Yusuke Matsuo
28	MF	JPN	Junya Nodake
29	FW	JPN	Shinya Utsumoto
30	DF	JPN	Yusho Takahashi
31	DF	BRA	Pereira
35	MF	JPN	Josei Sato
41	DF	JPN	Ryosuke Tone
45	FW	JPN	Taiga Kimoto ^{Type 2}
46	MF	JPN	Hayato Matsuoka ^{Type 2}
47	DF	JPN	Shunsuke Ono ^{Type 2}
49	DF	JPN	Kento Haneda

=== Out on loan ===
Note: Flags indicate national team as defined under FIFA eligibility rules; some limited exceptions apply. Players may hold more than one non-FIFA nationality.

No.	Pos.	Nation	Player
—	GK	JPN	Taro Hamada (at (Japan) AC Nagano Parceiro)
—	DF	JPN	Kenta Fukumori (at (Japan) Tochigi SC)

== Transfers ==
=== In ===
Pos.	Player	Transferred from	Fee	Date	Source
GK	(Japan)	(Japan)			
GK	(Japan)	(Japan)			

=== Out ===
Pos.	Player	Transferred to	Fee	Date	Source
GK	(Japan)	(Japan)			
GK	(Japan)	(Japan)			

== Pre-season and friendlies ==
Win Draw Loss Fixtures

2023 Friendly	Oita Trinita (Japan)	v	(Japan)	TBD
17:00

== Competitions ==
=== Overview ===
Competition	First match	Last match	Starting round	Final position	Record							
Competition	First match	Last match	Starting round	Final position	Pld	W	D	L	GF	GA	GD	Win %
J2 League	19 February 2023	12 November 2023	Matchday 1		20	11	4	5	26	24	+2	55.00
Emperor's Cup	7 June 2023		Second round	Second round	1	0	0	1	0	1	−1	0.00
Total					21	11	4	6	26	25	+1	52.38

Last updated: 11 June 2023
Source: Soccerway

=== J2 League ===
==== League table ====
Pos	Team	Pld	W	D	L	GF	GA	GD	Pts
7	V-Varen Nagasaki	42	18	11	13	70	56	+14	65
8	Ventforet Kofu	42	18	10	14	60	50	+10	64
9	Oita Trinita	42	17	11	14	54	56	−2	62
10	Fagiano Okayama	42	13	19	10	49	49	0	58
11	Thespakusatsu Gunma	42	14	15	13	44	44	0	57

Source: Meiji Yasuda J2 League, J.League Data Site
Rules for classification: 1) Points; 2) Goal difference; 3) Goals scored; 4) Head-to-head points; 5) Head-to-head goal difference; 6) Head-to-head goal scored; 7) Fair-play points.

==== Results summary ====
Overall								Home						Away					
Pld	W	D	L	GF	GA	GD	Pts	W	D	L	GF	GA	GD	W	D	L	GF	GA	GD
42	17	11	14	54	56	−2	62	11	3	7	30	27	+3	6	8	7	24	29	−5

Last updated: 12 November 2023.
Source: Worldfootball

==== Results by round ====
Round	1	2	3	4	5	6	7	8	9	10	11	12	13	14	15	16	17	18	19	20	21	22	23	24	25	26	27	28	29	30	31	32	33	34	35	36	37	38	39	40	41	42
Ground	A	H	H	A	H	A	H	A	H	A	H	A	A	H	H	A	H	A	H	A	H	A	A	H	H	A	H	H	A	H	A	H	A	A	H	A	H	A	A	H	A	H
Result	W	W	W	D	W	L	W	W	W	L	L	L	W	W	D	L	D	D	W	W	W	D	D	L	L	W	L	L	D	W	L	L	D	L	D	W	L	L	D	W	D	W
Position	3	3	1	2	2	3	3	2	1	2	2	4	3	2	2	3	3	5	2	2	2	2	3	3	5	4	5	7	7	5	5	6	7	10	11	8	10	11	11	9	9	9

Updated to match(es) played on 12 November 2023. Source: Worldfootball
A = Away; H = Home; W = Win; D = Draw; L = Loss

==== Matches ====
The league fixtures were announced on 20 January 2023.

19 February 2023 1	Tokushima Vortis	1–2	Oita Trinita	Naruto
13:00				Stadium: Pocarisweat Stadium; Attendance: 12,070; Referee: Tetsuro Yoshida

26 February 2023 2	Oita Trinita	1–0	Tokyo Verdy	Ōita
JST (UTC+9)				Stadium: Resonac Dome Oita

5 March 2023 3	Oita Trinita	1–0	Tochigi SC	Ōita
14:03 JST (UTC+9)	Takahata 81'	Report		Stadium: Resonac Dome Oita; Attendance: 11,747; Referee: Hirokazu Otsubo

12 March 2023 4	Shimizu S-Pulse	0–0	Oita Trinita	Shimizu
14:00		Report		Stadium: IAI Stadium Nihondaira; Attendance: 13,658; Referee: Keigo Sendachi

19 March 2023 5	Oita Trinita	2–1	JEF United Chiba	Ōita
14:00	Takahata 13', 72'	Report	Buwanika 90+4'	Stadium: Resonac Dome Oita; Attendance: 8,527; Referee: Kazuyoshi Enomoto

25 March 2023 6	Omiya Ardija	3–0	Oita Trinita	Saitama
JST (UTC+9)		Report		Stadium: NACK5 Stadium Omiya; Attendance: 4,966; Referee: Shuhei Shimizu

1 April 2023 7	Oita Trinita	2–1	Júbilo Iwata	Ōita
14:00 JST (UTC+9)	Nodake (yellow card) 23'; Shige 39'; Isa 59'	Report	Ricardo Graça (yellow card) 20'; Dudu Pacheco (yellow card) 37'; Uehara 84'	Stadium: Resonac Dome Oita; Attendance: 11,071; Referee: Akihiko Ikeuchi

8 April 2023 8	Iwaki FC	1–3	Oita Trinita	Iwaki
JST (UTC+9)	Kondo 80'	Report	Nakagawa 7'; Yumiba 65'; Nomura 68'	Stadium: Iwaki Greenfield Stadium; Attendance: 2,477; Referee: Toru Kakinuma

12 April 2023 9	Oita Trinita	3–1	Renofa Yamaguchi	Ōita
18:00	Matheus 44'; Fujimoto 45+2'; Nomura 72'	Report	Ikegami 68'	Stadium: Resonac Dome Oita; Referee: Koichiro Fukushima

16 April 2023 10	Machida Zelvia	3–1	Oita Trinita	Machida
14:00	Araki 23', 33'; Erik 39'	Report	Utsumoto 75'	Stadium: Machida GION Stadium; Attendance: 6,215; Referee: Hiroyuki Kimura

23 April 2023 11	Oita Trinita	0–1	Mito HollyHock	Ōita
14:03 JST (UTC+9)		Report	Sugiura 55'	Stadium: Resonac Dome Oita; Attendance: 8,273; Referee: Yosuke Kubota

29 April 2023 12	Vegalta Sendai	1–0	Oita Trinita	Sendai
14:03	Sagara 15', (yellow card) 18'; Kamada (yellow card) 56'	Report	Kagawa (red card) 34'; Matheus (yellow card) 52' (yellow-red card) 90+7'; Nagasawa (yellow card) 80'	Stadium: Yurtec Stadium Sendai; Attendance: 10,840; Referee: Keigo Sendachi

3 May 2023 13	Fujieda MYFC	0–2	Oita Trinita	Yamagata
14:03 JST (UTC+9)		Report	Isa 28'; Yumiba 85'	Stadium: ND Soft Stadium Yamagata; Attendance: 4,363; Referee: Yuichi Nishimura

7 May 2023 14	Oita Trinita	4–3	Zweigen Kanazawa	Ōita
14:00 JST (UTC+9)	Nakagawa 10', 57'; Nodake 38'; Ando 41'; Derlan (yellow card) 48'	Report	Sugiura 18'; Hayashi 32', (yellow card) 71'; Kato 55'; Jefferson Baiano (yellow card) 88'	Stadium: Resonac Dome Oita; Attendance: 7,788; Referee: Tomokazu Sato

13 May 2023 15	Oita Trinita	1–1	Roasso Kumamoto	Oita
15:00	Nakagawa 57'	Report	Ishikawa 12'	Stadium: Resonac Dome Oita; Attendance: 12,096; Referee: Hirokazu Otsubo

17 May 2023 16	Montedio Yamagata	5–0	Oita Trinita	Yamagata
13:33		Report		Stadium: ND Soft Stadium Yamagata; Attendance: 6,432; Referee: Futoshi Nakamura

21 May 2023 17	Oita Trinita	v	V-Varen Nagasaki	Ōita
14:00 JST (UTC+9)				Stadium: Resonac Dome Oita

=== Emperor's Cup ===
7 June 2023 Second round	Oita Trinita	0–1	Verspah Oita	Ōita
19:00 JST (UTC+9)		Report	Nakamura 6'	Stadium: Resonac Dome Oita; Attendance: 4,122; Referee: Tetsuro Yoshida
