= 2021 Emperor's Cup final =

2021年天皇杯決勝 (in Japanese)
- Event: 2021 Emperor's Cup
Urawa Red Diamonds	Oita Trinita
2	1
- Date: 19 December 2021
- Venue: Japan National Stadium, Shinjuku, Tokyo

The 2021 Emperor's Cup final was the final of the 2021 Emperor's Cup, the 92nd edition of the Emperor's Cup.

The match was contested at the Japan National Stadium in Tokyo.

== Teams ==
Team	League	Previous finals appearances (bold indicates winners)
Urawa Red Diamonds	J1 League	11 (1967, 1968, **1971**, **1973**, **1978**, 1979, **1980**, **2005**, **2006**, 2015, **2018**)
Oita Trinita	J1 League	0

== Road to the final ==
**Urawa Red Diamonds**		Round	**Oita Trinita**	
Opponent	Result	2021 Emperor's Cup	Opponent	Result
Bye		First round	Bye	
Kataller Toyama **(J3)**	3–2	Second round	Honda Lock SC **(JFL)**	3–2
SC Sagamihara **(J2)**	1–0	Third round	Fukui United FC **(HFL)**	2–0
Kyoto Sanga FC **(J2)**	1–0	Fourth round	Thespakusatsu Gunma **(J2)**	2–1
Gamba Osaka **(J1)**	2–0	Quarterfinals	Júbilo Iwata **(J2)**	2–0
Cerezo Osaka **(J1)**	2–0	Semifinals	Kawasaki Frontale **(J1)**	1–1

== Format ==
The final was played as a single match. If tied after regulation time, extra time and, would it necessary, a penalty shoot-out would have been used to decide the winning team.

== Details ==
19 December 2021
14:04 JST

Urawa Red Diamonds	2–1	Oita Trinita
Esaka 6'; Makino 90+3'	Report (JFA); Report (JFA) (in Japanese)	Pereira 90'

Japan National Stadium, Shinjuku, Tokyo
Attendance: 57,785
Referee: Yusuke Araki

**Urawa Red Diamonds**	**Oita Trinita**

GK	1	(Japan) Shūsaku Nishikawa (c)
DF	2	(Japan) Hiroki Sakai
DF	4	(Japan) Takuya Iwanami
DF	28	(Denmark) Alexander Scholz
DF	15	(Japan) Takahiro Akimoto
MF	41	(Japan) Takahiro Sekine		(substituted off) 83'
MF	17	(Japan) Atsuki Ito
MF	29	(Japan) Kai Shibato
MF	18	(Japan) Yoshio Koizumi		(substituted off) 83'
FW	33	(Japan) Ataru Esaka
FW	7	(Denmark) Kasper Junker		(substituted off) 72'
Substitutes:
GK	12	(Japan) Zion Suzuki
DF	3	(Japan) Tomoya Ugajin		(substituted on) 72'
DF	5	(Japan) Tomoaki Makino	(yellow card) 90+5'	(substituted on) 83'
DF	8	(Japan) Daigo Nishi
MF	21	(Japan) Tomoaki Ōkubo		(substituted on) 83'
MF	24	(Japan) Koya Yuruki
MF	40	(Japan) Yūichi Hirano
Manager:
(Spain) Ricardo Rodríguez

GK	1	(Japan) Shun Takagi (c)
DF	3	(Japan) Yuto Misao	(yellow card) 90+2'
DF	14	(Brazil) Henrique Trevisan
DF	15	(Japan) Yuta Koide		(substituted off) 79'
MF	6	(Japan) Yuki Kobayashi
MF	8	(Japan) Yamato Machida
MF	11	(Japan) Hokuto Shimoda
MF	25	(Japan) Seigo Kobayashi		(substituted off) 72'
MF	31	(Brazil) Pereira	(yellow card) 82'
FW	13	(Japan) Kohei Isa		(substituted off) 79'
FW	16	(Japan) Arata Watanabe
Substitutes:
GK	22	(Japan) William Popp
DF	41	(Japan) Ryosuke Tone
MF	7	(Japan) Rei Matsumoto		(substituted on) 79'
MF	10	(Japan) Naoki Nomura		(substituted on) 72'
MF	17	(Japan) Kenta Inoue
MF	43	(Japan) Masaki Yumiba
FW	20	(Japan) Shun Nagasawa		(substituted on) 79'
Manager:
(Japan) Tomohiro Katanosaka
