= Yoshinori Suzuki =

Japanese footballer (born 1992)

Yoshinori Suzuki 鈴木 義宜
Personal information
- Full name: Yoshinori Suzuki
- Date of birth: 11 September 1992 (age 34)
- Place of birth: Miyazaki, Japan
- Height: 1.84 m (6 ft 0 in)
- Position: Centre back

Team information
- Current team: Kyoto Sanga FC
- Number: 50

Youth career
- –2004: Hirose SSS
- 2005–2007: Miyazaki Nihon Univ. Junior High School
- 2008–2010: Miyazaki Nihon University High School

College career
Years	Team	Apps	(Gls)
2011–2014	Miyazaki Sangyo-keiei University		

Senior career*
Years	Team	Apps	(Gls)
2014–2021	Oita Trinita	222	(6)
2021–2023	Shimizu S-Pulse	97	(5)
2024–	Kyoto Sanga FC	82	(2)
- * Club domestic league appearances and goals as of 1 August 2026

Yoshinori Suzuki (鈴木 義宜, Suzuki Yoshinori; born 11 September 1992 in Miyazaki, Miyazaki) is a Japanese footballer who plays as a centre-back for Japanese club Kyoto Sanga FC.

== Career ==
In September 2023, Suzuki won the J2 Monthly MVP award for August.

== Club statistics ==
As of 25 September 2023.

Appearances and goals by club, season and competition
Club	Season	League			National Cup (Note: Includes Emperor's Cup)		League Cup (Note: Includes J.League Cup)		Total	
Club	Season	Division	Apps	Goals	Apps	Goals	Apps	Goals	Apps	Goals
Miyazaki Sangyo- keiei Univ.	2011	–			2	0	–		2	0
Miyazaki Sangyo- keiei Univ.	2012	–			1	0	–		1	0
Miyazaki Sangyo- keiei Univ.	2013	–			1	0	–		1	0
Miyazaki Sangyo- keiei Univ.	Total		0	0	4	0	0	0	4	0
Oita Trinita	2014	J2 League	0	0	0	0	–		0	0
Oita Trinita	2015	J2 League	41 (Note: Includes one appearance in J2/J3 play-offs)	1	3	0	–		44	1
Oita Trinita	2016	J3 League	30	1	2	0	–		32	1
Oita Trinita	2017	J2 League	42	3	0	0	–		42	3
Oita Trinita	2018	J2 League	42	1	0	0	–		42	1
Oita Trinita	2019	J1 League	34	0	2	0	0	0	36	0
Oita Trinita	2020	J1 League	33	0	0	0	1	0	34	0
Oita Trinita	Total		222	6	7	0	1	0	230	6
Shimizu S-Pulse	2021	J1 League	22	2	0	0	5	0	27	2
Shimizu S-Pulse	2022	J1 League	33	1	1	0	3	0	37	1
Shimizu S-Pulse	2023	J2 League	34	2	1	0	1	0	36	2
Shimizu S-Pulse	Total		89	5	2	0	9	0	100	5
Career total			311	11	13	0	10	0	334	11

== Honours ==
Individual

- J2 League Best XI: 2023
