= 2026–27 Oita Trinita season =

Oita Trinita
2026–27 season
- Manager: Shuhei Yomoda
- Stadium: Crasus Dome Oita
- J2 League: 11th
- Emperor's Cup: Second round
- J.League Cup: First round
- Top goalscorer: League: Kotaro Arima (4); All: Kotaro Arima (4)

During the 2026–27 season, Oita Trinita competes in the J2 League, the Emperor's Cup, and the J.League Cup.

== Transfers ==
=== In ===
| Pos. | Player | Transferred from | Fee | Date | Source |
|---|---|---|---|---|---|
| FW | (Japan) Daigo Furukawa | (Japan) Renofa Yamaguchi | Undisclosed | 1 July 2026 | |
| MF | (Japan) Koya Hayashida | (Japan) Ventforet Kofu | Free | 1 July 2026 | |
| DF | (Japan) Seiya Inoue | (Japan) Avispa Fukuoka | Loan | 1 July 2026 | |
| DF | (Japan) Kimiya Moriyama | (Japan) Avispa Fukuoka | Loan | 1 July 2026 | |
| MF | (Japan) Yasufumi Nishimura | (Japan) Thespa Gunma | Undisclosed | 1 July 2026 | |
| MF | (Japan) Itsuki Oda | (Japan) Matsumoto Yamaga | Undisclosed | 1 July 2026 | |
| FW | (Japan) David Aizawa | (Japan) Vissel Kobe | Loan | 29 July 2026 | |

=== Out ===
| Pos. | Player | Transferred to | Fee | Date | Source |
|---|---|---|---|---|---|
| FW | (Japan) Kohei Isa | (Japan) FC Osaka | Undisclosed | 1 July 2026 | |
| FW | (South Korea) Kim Hyun-woo | (Japan) Tokyo Verdy | Undisclosed | 1 July 2026 | |
| MF | (Japan) Arata Kozakai | (Japan) Ehime FC | Undisclosed | 1 July 2026 | |
| MF | (Japan) Junya Nodake | (Japan) Thespa Gunma | Undisclosed | 1 July 2026 | |
| DF | (Japan) Takuya Okamoto | (Japan) Fujieda MYFC | Undisclosed | 1 July 2026 | |
| MF | (Japan) Manato Yoshida | (Japan) Sagan Tosu | Undisclosed | 1 July 2026 | |

== Competitions ==
=== J2 League ===
| Pos | Team | Pld | W | D | L | GF | GA | GD | Pts |
|---|---|---|---|---|---|---|---|---|---|
| 10 | Iwaki FC | 17 | 7 | 3 | 7 | 28 | 24 | +4 | 24 |
| 11 | Sagan Tosu | 17 | 7 | 2 | 8 | 18 | 20 | −2 | 23 |
| 12 | Oita Trinita | 17 | 5 | 7 | 5 | 20 | 20 | 0 | 22 |
| 13 | Blaublitz Akita | 17 | 5 | 5 | 7 | 18 | 22 | −4 | 20 |
| 14 | Tokushima Vortis | 17 | 6 | 2 | 9 | 15 | 19 | −4 | 20 |

Updated to match(es) played on 15 November 2026. Source: J2 League Soccer King
Rules for classification: 1) Points; 2) Goal difference; 3) Goals scored; 4) Head-to-head points; 5) Head-to-head goal difference; 6) Head-to-head goal scored; 7) Fair-play points.

| Round | 1 | 2 | 3 | 4 | 5 | 6 | 7 | 8 | 9 | 10 | 11 | 12 | 13 | 14 | 15 | 16 | 17 |
|---|---|---|---|---|---|---|---|---|---|---|---|---|---|---|---|---|---|
| Ground | H | A | H | A | H | A | A | H | H | A | H | A | H | A | H | A | H |
| Result | L | D | W | L | D | D | D | D | W | W | W | D | D | L | W | L | L |
| Position | | | | | | | | | | | | | | | | | |

Updated to match(es) played on 14 November 2026. Source:
A = Away; H = Home; W = Win; D = Draw; L = Loss

| 8 August 2026 1 | Oita Trinita | 0–1 | Shonan Bellmare | Ōita |
| 19:00 UTC+9 | | | | Stadium: Crasus Dome Oita |

| 15 August 2026 2 | Vegalta Sendai | 0–0 | Oita Trinita | Sendai |
| 19:00 UTC+9 |

| 22 August 2026 3 | Oita Trinita | 4–1 | Iwaki FC | Ōita |
| 19:00 UTC+9 | | | | Stadium: Crasus Dome Oita |

| 29 August 2026 4 | Tokushima Vortis | 1–0 | Oita Trinita | Tokushima |
| 19:00 UTC+9 |

| 6 September 2026 5 | Oita Trinita | 1–1 | FC Imabari | Ōita |
| 19:00 UTC+9 | | | | Stadium: Crasus Dome Oita |

| 12 September 2026 6 | RB Omiya Ardija | 0–0 | Oita Trinita | Ōmiya |
| 19:00 UTC+9 |

| 19 September 2026 7 | Hokkaido Consadole Sapporo | 1–1 | Oita Trinita | Sapporo |
| 14:00 UTC+9 |

| 26 September 2026 8 | Oita Trinita | 1–1 | Fujieda MYFC | Ōita |
| 17:00 UTC+9 | | | | Stadium: Crasus Dome Oita |

| 3 October 2026 9 | Oita Trinita | 2–1 | Montedio Yamagata | Ōita |
| 17:00 UTC+9 | | | | Stadium: Crasus Dome Oita |

| 10 October 2026 10 | Yokohama FC | 1–2 | Oita Trinita | Yokohama |
| 14:00 UTC+9 |

| 17 October 2026 11 | Oita Trinita | 5–1 | Albirex Niigata | Ōita |
| 14:00 UTC+9 | | | | Stadium: Crasus Dome Oita |

| 21 October 2026 12 | Júbilo Iwata | 0–0 | Oita Trinita | Iwata |
| 19:00 UTC+9 |

| 25 October 2026 13 | Oita Trinita | 1–1 | Ventforet Kofu | Ōita |
| 14:00 UTC+9 | | | | Stadium: Crasus Dome Oita |

| 31 October 2026 14 | Tegevajaro Miyazaki | 2–0 | Oita Trinita | Miyazaki |
| 14:00 UTC+9 |

| 3 November 2026 15 | Oita Trinita | 1–0 | Vanraure Hachinohe | Ōita |
| 14:00 UTC+9 | | | | Stadium: Crasus Dome Oita |

| 7 November 2026 16 | Blaublitz Akita | 2–1 | Oita Trinita | Akita |
| 14:00 UTC+9 |

| 14 November 2026 17 | Oita Trinita | 1–6 | Tochigi City FC | Ōita |
| 14:00 UTC+9 | | | | Stadium: Crasus Dome Oita |

=== Emperor's Cup ===
| 26 August 2026 Second round | Iwaki FC | 2–0 (a.e.t.) | Oita Trinita | Iwaki |
| 19:00 UTC+9 |

=== J.League Cup ===
| 2 September 2026 First round | Roasso Kumamoto | 2–0 | Oita Trinita | Kumamoto |
| 19:00 UTC+9 |
