= 2019 Oita Trinita season =

Oita Trinita
2019 season
- Chairman: Toru Enoki
- Manager: Tomohiro Katanosaka
- Stadium: Ōita Bank Dome
- Average home league attendance: 15,347
Home colours	Away colours

The 2019 Oita Trinita season saw the team competing in the J1 League after being promoted by finishing second in the 2018 J2 League. They also competed in the J.League Cup and the Emperor's Cup.

== Squad ==
As of 2 March 2019. Note: Flags indicate national team as defined under FIFA eligibility rules; some limited exceptions apply. Players may hold more than one non-FIFA nationality.

No.	Pos.	Nation	Player
1	GK	JPN	Shun Takagi
3	DF	JPN	Yuto Misao
4	MF	JPN	Toshio Shimakawa
5	DF	JPN	Yoshinori Suzuki (captain)
6	DF	JPN	Naoya Fukumori
7	MF	JPN	Rei Matsumoto
8	MF	JPN	Takuya Marutani
9	FW	JPN	Yusuke Goto
10	FW	JPN	Noriaki Fujimoto
11	MF	JPN	Kenji Baba
14	MF	JPN	Kazuki Kozuka
16	DF	JPN	Jun Okano (on loan from JEF United Chiba)
18	FW	JPN	Kohei Isa
19	DF	JPN	Yuji Hoshi
20	MF	JPN	Koki Kotegawa
21	GK	JPN	Ryosuke Kojima
22	GK	KOR	Mun Kyung-gun
23	FW	JPN	Kaoru Takayama

No.	Pos.	Nation	Player
25	MF	JPN	Seigo Kobayashi
27	FW	JPN	Kazushi Mitsuhira
28	MF	JPN	Daisuke Sakai
29	DF	JPN	Tomoki Iwata
30	FW	JPN	Tsubasa Yoshihira
31	GK	JPN	William Popp (on loan from Kawasaki Frontale)
32	MF	JPN	Ryosuke Maeda
38	MF	JPN	Keita Takahata
39	DF	JPN	Honoya Shoji (on loan from Cerezo Osaka)
40	MF	JPN	Yushi Hasegawa
41	DF	JPN	Ryosuke Tone
42	DF	JPN	Taichi Yano (Type 2 Player)
43	MF	JPN	Kyoya Saijo (Type 2 Player)
44	MF	THA	Thitiphan Puangchan (on loan from BG Pathum United)
45	FW	JPN	Ado Onaiwu (on loan from Urawa Reds)
46	MF	JPN	Ryotaro Ito (on loan from Urawa Reds)
47	MF	JPN	Taiga Kudo (Type 2 Player)

== Competitions ==
=== J1 League ===
==== Results ====
23 February 2019 1	Kashima Antlers	1 – 2	Oita Trinita	Kashima
15:03 JST	Ito 48'	Report	Fujimoto 18', 69'; Maeda (yellow card) 64'	Stadium: Kashima Soccer Stadium; Attendance: 19,463; Referee: Hajime Matsuo

2 March 2019 2	Oita Trinita	0 – 1	Matsumoto Yamaga	Ōita
16:05 JST	Suzuki (yellow card) 73'	Report	Nagai 50'; Fujita (yellow card) 77'	Stadium: Ōita Bank Dome; Attendance: 13,329; Referee: Akihiko Ikeuchi

9 March 2019 3	Jubilo Iwata	1 – 2	Oita Trinita	Iwata
15:04 JST	Ominami (red card) 30'; Adailton 41'; Musaev (yellow card) 90+5'	Report	Fujimoto 13'; Goto 55'; Suzuki (yellow card) 61'	Stadium: Yamaha Stadium; Attendance: 12,345; Referee: Tomohiro Inoue

17 March 2019 4	Oita Trinita	v	Yokohama F. Marinos
		Report

=== J. League Cup ===
==== Group stage ====
Pos	Team	Pld	W	D	L	GF	GA	GD	Pts	CER	GRA	TRI	VIS
1	Cerezo Osaka	6	3	2	1	9	4	+5	11	—	3–0	2–0	1–0
2	Nagoya Grampus	6	2	3	1	11	11	0	9	2–2	—	2–1	2–2
3	Oita Trinita	6	2	1	3	7	10	−3	7	2–1	2–2	—	2–1
4	Vissel Kobe	6	1	2	3	6	8	−2	5	0–0	1–3	2–0	—

Source: League table, Match results
