= 2015 Oita Trinita season =

Oita Trinita
2015 season
- Manager: Kazuaki Tasaka; Nobuaki Yanagida
- Stadium: Oita Bank Dome
- J2 League: 21st

2015 Oita Trinita season.

== J2 League ==
=== League table ===
Pos	Team	Pld	W	D	L	GF	GA	GD	Pts	Promotion, qualification or relegation
20	FC Gifu	42	12	7	23	37	71	−34	43	
21	Oita Trinita (R)	42	8	14	20	41	51	−10	38	Qualification for relegation playoffs (Note: The playoffs and direct exchange between J2 and J3 are subject to eligibility of J2-licensed teams in top 2 of 2015 J3 League.)
22	Tochigi SC (R)	42	7	14	21	39	64	−25	35	Relegation to 2016 J3 League

Source: Meiji Yasuda J2 League Standing
Rules for classification: 1) Points; 2) Goal difference; 3) Goals scored
(R) Relegated

=== Match details ===
J2 League match details
Match	Date	Team	Score	Team	Venue	Attendance
1	2015.03.08	Kamatamare Sanuki	2-0	Oita Trinita	Kagawa Marugame Stadium	4,198
2	2015.03.15	Oita Trinita	0-1	Fagiano Okayama	Oita Bank Dome	8,310
3	2015.03.21	Thespakusatsu Gunma	1-1	Oita Trinita	Shoda Shoyu Stadium Gunma	4,135
4	2015.03.29	Júbilo Iwata	2-1	Oita Trinita	Yamaha Stadium	7,748
5	2015.04.01	Oita Trinita	6-2	FC Gifu	Oita Bank Dome	5,122
6	2015.04.05	Ehime FC	2-0	Oita Trinita	Ningineer Stadium	2,211
7	2015.04.11	Oita Trinita	1-2	Avispa Fukuoka	Oita Bank Dome	7,332
8	2015.04.19	Oita Trinita	0-3	Omiya Ardija	Oita Bank Dome	6,307
9	2015.04.26	V-Varen Nagasaki	0-1	Oita Trinita	Nagasaki Stadium	5,560
10	2015.04.29	Oita Trinita	0-1	Tochigi SC	Oita Bank Dome	6,543
11	2015.05.03	Oita Trinita	1-1	Tokushima Vortis	Oita Bank Dome	6,615
12	2015.05.06	Roasso Kumamoto	0-0	Oita Trinita	Umakana-Yokana Stadium	12,770
13	2015.05.09	Oita Trinita	1-1	Yokohama FC	Oita Bank Dome	7,246
14	2015.05.17	Mito HollyHock	1-1	Oita Trinita	K's denki Stadium Mito	4,553
15	2015.05.24	Oita Trinita	0-1	Tokyo Verdy	Oita Bank Dome	6,548
16	2015.05.31	Giravanz Kitakyushu	2-1	Oita Trinita	Honjo Stadium	4,309
17	2015.06.06	Oita Trinita	2-2	Kyoto Sanga FC	Oita Bank Dome	5,355
18	2015.06.14	Zweigen Kanazawa	1-1	Oita Trinita	Ishikawa Athletics Stadium	6,247
19	2015.06.21	Oita Trinita	0-1	JEF United Chiba	Oita Bank Dome	6,031
20	2015.06.29	Consadole Sapporo	1-1	Oita Trinita	Sapporo Dome	8,974
21	2015.07.04	Cerezo Osaka	0-0	Oita Trinita	Kincho Stadium	8,946
22	2015.07.08	Oita Trinita	1-1	Mito HollyHock	Oita Bank Dome	4,103
23	2015.07.12	Tokyo Verdy	1-2	Oita Trinita	Ajinomoto Stadium	4,592
24	2015.07.18	Oita Trinita	2-1	V-Varen Nagasaki	Oita Bank Dome	7,866
25	2015.07.22	Tokushima Vortis	1-0	Oita Trinita	Pocarisweat Stadium	3,509
26	2015.07.26	Oita Trinita	2-0	Thespakusatsu Gunma	Oita Bank Dome	15,152
27	2015.08.01	Avispa Fukuoka	1-1	Oita Trinita	Level5 Stadium	6,559
28	2015.08.08	Oita Trinita	0-1	Ehime FC	Oita Bank Dome	7,086
29	2015.08.15	Kyoto Sanga FC	2-1	Oita Trinita	Kyoto Nishikyogoku Athletic Stadium	6,166
30	2015.08.23	Oita Trinita	1-3	Cerezo Osaka	Oita Bank Dome	10,229
31	2015.09.13	Oita Trinita	0-1	Roasso Kumamoto	Oita Bank Dome	6,890
32	2015.09.20	FC Gifu	0-3	Oita Trinita	Gifu Nagaragawa Stadium	8,814
33	2015.09.23	Oita Trinita	2-1	Giravanz Kitakyushu	Oita Bank Dome	7,463
34	2015.09.27	Fagiano Okayama	1-0	Oita Trinita	City Light Stadium	7,055
35	2015.10.04	Oita Trinita	0-0	Kamatamare Sanuki	Oita Bank Dome	7,117
36	2015.10.10	Tochigi SC	1-1	Oita Trinita	Tochigi Green Stadium	6,717
37	2015.10.18	JEF United Chiba	2-2	Oita Trinita	Fukuda Denshi Arena	10,658
38	2015.10.25	Oita Trinita	2-0	Consadole Sapporo	Oita Bank Dome	9,062
39	2015.11.01	Oita Trinita	0-1	Zweigen Kanazawa	Oita Bank Dome	7,309
40	2015.11.08	Yokohama FC	1-0	Oita Trinita	NHK Spring Mitsuzawa Football Stadium	3,518
41	2015.11.14	Omiya Ardija	3-2	Oita Trinita	NACK5 Stadium Omiya	10,595
42	2015.11.23	Oita Trinita	1-2	Júbilo Iwata	Oita Bank Dome	10,508
