= Nodake =

Nodake (written: 野嶽) is a Japanese surname. Notable people with the surname include:

- Hiroya Nodake (野嶽 寛也, born 2000), Japanese footballer
- Junya Nodake (野嶽 惇也, born 1994), Japanese footballer
