= Kenshin Yasuda =

Japanese footballer

Kenshin Yasuda 保田 堅心
Personal information
- Date of birth: 5 March 2005 (age 21)
- Place of birth: Fukuoka, Japan
- Height: 1.81 m (5 ft 11 in)
- Position: Midfielder

Team information
- Current team: V-Varen Nagasaki
- Number: 7

Youth career
- FC J-Win
- Sagan Tosu
- –2021: Oita Trinita

Senior career*
Years	Team	Apps	(Gls)
2021–2026	Oita Trinita	68	(6)
2025–2026	→ Jong Genk (loan)	29	(1)
2026–	V-Varen Nagasaki	3	(1)

International career^{‡}
2022–2025	Japan U20	11	(0)
2023	Japan U18	1	(0)
2024	Japan U19	5	(0)
2025–	Japan U23	7	(0)
Medal record
Men's football
Representing Japan
Asian Games
Silver medal – second place	2026 Aichi–Nagoya
- * Club domestic league appearances and goals as of 6 September 2026 ‡ National team caps and goals as of 3 October 2026

Kenshin Yasuda (保田 堅心, Yasuda Kenshin; born 5 March 2005) is a Japanese footballer currently playing as a midfielder for J1 League club V-Varen Nagasaki.

== Club career ==
Yasuda made his professional debut for Oita Trinita in a 2–1 Emperor's Cup win against Thespakusatsu Gunma.

On 8 January 2025, Yasuda joined Jong Genk in Belgium on a loan-deal, on a contract for the rest of the season, with an option to buy.

On 6 July 2026, Yasuda joined V-Varen Nagasaki on a undisclosed deal.

== International career ==
In June 2024, he took part in the Maurice Revello Tournament in France. with Japan.

== Career statistics ==
=== Club ===
As of match played 6 September 2026

Appearances and goals by club, season and competition
Club	Season	League			National Cup		League Cup		Other		Total	
Club	Season	Division	Apps	Goals	Apps	Goals	Apps	Goals	Apps	Goals	Apps	Goals
Oita Trinita	2021	J1 League	0	0	1	0	0	0	0	0	1	0
Oita Trinita	2022	J2 League	8	0	2	0	2	0	1 (Note: Appearance in promotion play-offs)	0	13	0
Oita Trinita	2023	J2 League	29	2	1	0	—		—		30	2
Oita Trinita	2024	J2 League	31	4	1	1	1	0	—		36	5
Oita Trinita	Total		68	6	5	1	3	0	1	0	80	7
Jong Genk (loan)	2024–25	Challenger Pro League	11	0	—		—		—		11	0
Jong Genk (loan)	2025–26	Challenger Pro League	18	1	—		—		—		18	1
Jong Genk (loan)	Total		29	1	—		—		—		29	1
V-Varen Nagasaki	2026–27	J1 League	3	1	0	0	0	0	—		3	1
Career total			100	8	5	1	3	0	1	0	112	9
