= Matheus Pereira =

Matheus Pereira may refer to:

- Matheus Pereira (footballer, born 1996), Brazilian football midfielder for Cruzeiro
- Matheus Pereira (footballer, born 1997), Brazilian football midfielder for Oita Trinita
- Matheus Pereira (footballer, born 1998), Brazilian football midfielder for Eibar
- Matheus Pereira (footballer, born 2000), Brazilian football left-back for Toronto FC
