= Daniel Tijolo =

Brazilian footballer (1982–2019)

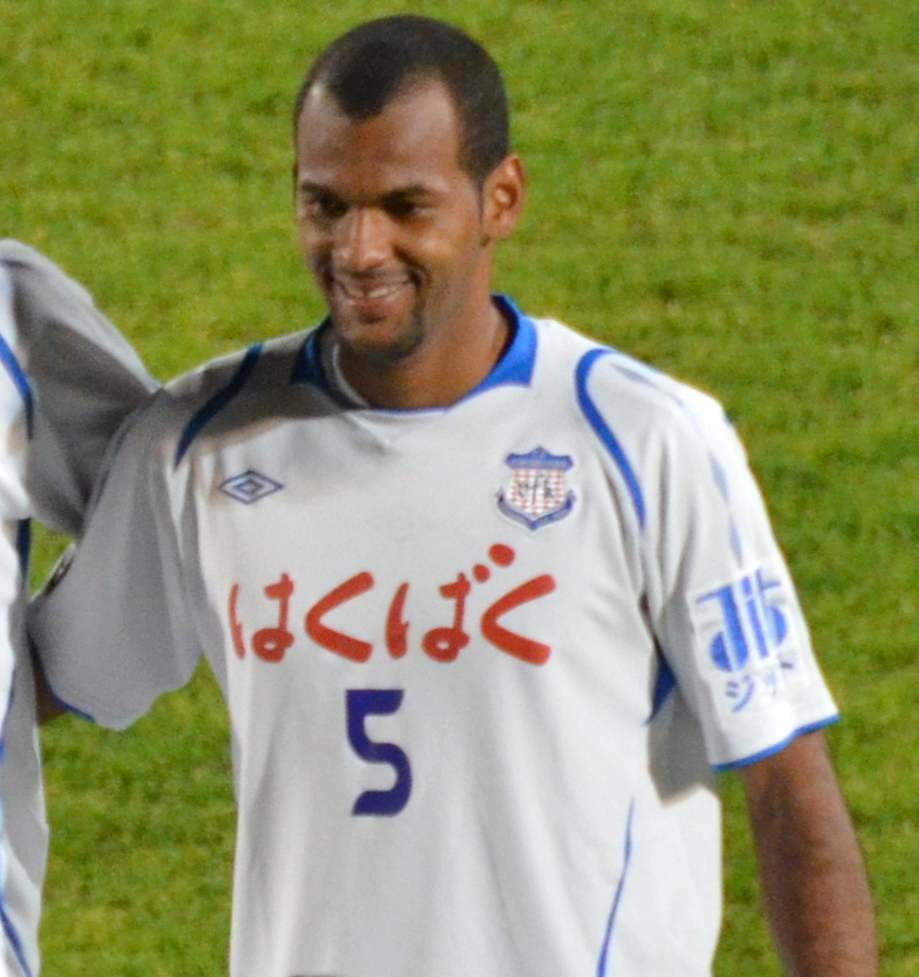

Personal information
- Full name: Daniel Silva dos Santos
- Date of birth: May 30, 1982
- Place of birth: Cabo Frio, Brazil
- Date of death: February 10, 2019 (aged 36)
- Place of death: Cabo Frio, Brazil
- Height: 1.86 m (6 ft 1 in)
- Position: Defensive midfielder

Youth career
- 2001–2002: Rio das Ostras

Senior career*
Years	Team	Apps	(Gls)
2003	Cabofriense		
2004	Mixto-MT		
2005–2009	Cabofriense		
2006	→ Paysandu (Loan)		
2007	→ Ituano (Loan)		
2007	→ Cruzeiro (Loan)	5	(0)
2007–2008	→ São Caetano (loan)		
2009–2011	Ventforet Kofu	100	(4)
2012–2013	Nagoya Grampus	54	(1)
2014	Cabofriense	10	(1)
2014	Vila Nova	2	(0)
2014–2016	Oita Trinita	39	(2)
- * Club domestic league appearances and goals as of 10 June 2015

Daniel Silva dos Santos, also known as Daniel Tijolo (May 30, 1982 - February 10, 2019), was a Brazilian defensive midfielder who played several years in Japan.

== Club statistics ==
Updated to 23 February 2016.

Club performance			League		Cup		League Cup		Total	
Season	Club	League	Apps	Goals	Apps	Goals	Apps	Goals	Apps	Goals
Japan			League		Emperor's Cup		J. League Cup		Total	
2009	Ventforet Kofu	J2 League	44	2	1	0	–		45	2
2010	Ventforet Kofu	J2 League	28	1	1	0	–		29	1
2011	Ventforet Kofu	J1 League	28	1	0	0	1	0	29	1
2012	Nagoya Grampus	J1 League	30	0	3	0	2	0	35	0
2013	Nagoya Grampus	J1 League	24	1	1	0	2	0	27	1
2014	Oita Trinita	J2 League	11	2	–		–		11	2
2015	Oita Trinita	J2 League	28	0	2	0	–		30	0
Career total			193	7	8	0	5	0	206	7

== Honours ==
- Paraná State League: 2006
