= Hiroya Nodake =

Japanese footballer

Hiroya Nodake 野嶽 寛也
Personal information
- Full name: Hiroya Nodake
- Date of birth: December 3, 2000 (age 25)
- Place of birth: Kagoshima City, Kagoshima Prefecture, Japan
- Height: 1.70 m (5 ft 7 in)
- Position: Midfielder

Team information
- Current team: Montedio Yamagata
- Number: 13

Youth career
- –2012: Taiyo SC
- 2013–2015: Murasakibaru Junior High School
- 2016–2018: Kagoshima United

Senior career*
Years	Team	Apps	(Gls)
2018–2024	Kagoshima United	91	(4)
2025–	Montedio Yamagata	44	(1)
- * Club domestic league appearances and goals as of 13 August 2026

Hiroya Nodake (野嶽 寛也, Nodake Hiroya; born December 3, 2000) is a Japanese football player who plays for Montedio Yamagata.

His elder brother Junya is also a professional footballer currently playing for J2 League side Oita Trinita.

== Playing career ==
Nodake was born in Kagoshima Prefecture on December 3, 2000. He joined J3 League club Kagoshima United FC from youth team in 2018.
