= 2018 Oita Trinita season =

Oita Trinita
2018 season
- Manager: Tomohiro Katanosaka
- Stadium: Oita Bank Dome
- J2 League: 2nd

2018 Oita Trinita season.

== J2 League ==
Match	Date	Team	Score	Team	Venue	Attendance
1	2018.02.25	Tochigi SC	2-4	Oita Trinita	Tochigi Green Stadium	8,526
2	2018.03.04	Oita Trinita	2-2	Montedio Yamagata	Oita Bank Dome	9,024
3	2018.03.11	Fagiano Okayama	1-0	Oita Trinita	City Light Stadium	8,358
4	2018.03.17	Oita Trinita	0-0	Tokyo Verdy	Oita Bank Dome	6,297
5	2018.03.21	Oita Trinita	3-1	Mito HollyHock	Oita Bank Dome	6,133
6	2018.03.25	Kamatamare Sanuki	1-2	Oita Trinita	Pikara Stadium	2,770
7	2018.04.01	Oita Trinita	4-0	JEF United Chiba	Oita Bank Dome	6,797
8	2018.04.07	Kyoto Sanga FC	0-1	Oita Trinita	Kyoto Nishikyogoku Athletic Stadium	5,099
9	2018.04.15	Oita Trinita	1-1	Yokohama FC	Oita Bank Dome	8,102
10	2018.04.22	Zweigen Kanazawa	0-1	Oita Trinita	Ishikawa Athletics Stadium	4,131
11	2018.04.28	Oita Trinita	4-3	FC Machida Zelvia	Oita Bank Dome	7,205
12	2018.05.03	Oita Trinita	1-2	Omiya Ardija	Oita Bank Dome	10,134
13	2018.05.06	Albirex Niigata	1-2	Oita Trinita	Denka Big Swan Stadium	19,020
14	2018.05.13	Oita Trinita	2-1	FC Gifu	Oita Bank Dome	6,609
15	2018.05.20	Oita Trinita	2-2	Renofa Yamaguchi FC	Oita Bank Dome	11,862
16	2018.05.26	Ventforet Kofu	6-2	Oita Trinita	Yamanashi Chuo Bank Stadium	7,639
17	2018.06.03	Oita Trinita	2-0	Roasso Kumamoto	Oita Bank Dome	8,371
18	2018.06.10	Ehime FC	1-0	Oita Trinita	Ningineer Stadium	2,720
19	2018.06.16	Matsumoto Yamaga FC	1-4	Oita Trinita	Matsumotodaira Park Stadium	11,942
20	2018.06.23	Oita Trinita	1-0	Avispa Fukuoka	Oita Bank Dome	12,056
21	2018.06.30	Tokushima Vortis	3-0	Oita Trinita	Pocarisweat Stadium	4,491
22	2018.07.07	Oita Trinita	2-4	Ventforet Kofu	Oita Bank Dome	7,152
23	2018.07.15	Omiya Ardija	1-0	Oita Trinita	NACK5 Stadium Omiya	9,272
24	2018.07.21	Oita Trinita	0-0	Tochigi SC	Oita Bank Dome	7,080
25	2018.07.25	Oita Trinita	0-1	Ehime FC	Oita Bank Dome	4,880
26	2018.07.29	FC Gifu	0-2	Oita Trinita	Gifu Nagaragawa Stadium	6,068
27	2018.08.05	Oita Trinita	4-0	Albirex Niigata	Oita Bank Dome	5,635
28	2018.08.11	Oita Trinita	4-1	Fagiano Okayama	Oita Bank Dome	11,064
29	2018.08.18	Tokyo Verdy	0-0	Oita Trinita	Ajinomoto Stadium	9,214
30	2018.08.25	Oita Trinita	0-1	Tokushima Vortis	Oita Bank Dome	8,738
31	2018.09.01	Avispa Fukuoka	1-0	Oita Trinita	Level5 Stadium	10,120
32	2018.09.08	Roasso Kumamoto	1-3	Oita Trinita	Egao Kenko Stadium	10,226
33	2018.09.15	Oita Trinita	5-0	Kamatamare Sanuki	Oita Bank Dome	11,156
34	2018.09.22	Renofa Yamaguchi FC	1-3	Oita Trinita	Ishin Me-Life Stadium	8,189
35	2018.09.29	Mito HollyHock	1-2	Oita Trinita	K's denki Stadium Mito	4,001
36	2018.10.07	Oita Trinita	2-1	Kyoto Sanga FC	Oita Bank Dome	9,563
37	2018.10.14	FC Machida Zelvia	3-2	Oita Trinita	Machida Stadium	5,161
38	2018.10.21	JEF United Chiba	2-4	Oita Trinita	Fukuda Denshi Arena	8,973
39	2018.10.28	Oita Trinita	1-0	Matsumoto Yamaga FC	Oita Bank Dome	15,125
40	2018.11.04	Yokohama FC	3-1	Oita Trinita	NHK Spring Mitsuzawa Football Stadium	8,222
41	2018.11.10	Oita Trinita	2-1	Zweigen Kanazawa	Oita Bank Dome	14,069
42	2018.11.17	Montedio Yamagata	1-1	Oita Trinita	ND Soft Stadium Yamagata	6,852
