= Yamato Machida =

Japanese footballer (born 1989)

Personal information
- Full name: Yamato Machida
- Date of birth: December 19, 1989 (age 36)
- Place of birth: Saitama, Japan
- Height: 1.66 m (5 ft 5 in)
- Position: Midfielder

Team information
- Current team: Giravanz Kitakyushu
- Number: 8

Youth career
- 1996–2000: Urawa Bessho SSS
- 2001: FC Urawa
- 2002–2004: Shirahata Junior High School
- 2005–2007: Saitama Sakae High School

College career
Years	Team	Apps	(Gls)
2008–2011	Senshu University		

Senior career*
Years	Team	Apps	(Gls)
2012–2018	JEF United Chiba	153	(22)
2019	Matsumoto Yamaga	13	(0)
2020–2024	Oita Trinita	91	(9)
2025–	Giravanz Kitakyushu	6	(0)
- * Club domestic league appearances and goals as of 1 January 2026

Yamato Machida (町田 也真人, born December 19, 1989) is a Japanese footballer who plays as a midfielder for Giravanz Kitakyushu in the J3 League.

== Career ==
After graduating high school he entered the Senshu University where he represented them at football. After graduation in 2012, he signed for JEF United Chiba. He made his debut in the away loss (0–2) against Kyoto Sanga FC on 11 March 2012 by replacing Kazuki Oiwa in the 89th minute.

== Club statistics ==
Updated to 19 December 2018.

Club performance			League		Cup		Other		Total	
Season	Club	League	Apps	Goals	Apps	Goals	Apps	Goals	Apps	Goals
Japan			League		Emperor's Cup		Other^{1}		Total	
2012	JEF United Chiba	J2 League	7	0	2	0	–		9	0
2013	JEF United Chiba	J2 League	9	0	2	0	1	0	12	0
2014	JEF United Chiba	J2 League	27	0	4	1	1	0	32	1
2015	JEF United Chiba	J2 League	17	1	2	1	–		19	2
2016	JEF United Chiba	J2 League	32	11	3	0	–		35	11
2017	JEF United Chiba	J2 League	36	6	2	0	1	0	39	6
2018	JEF United Chiba	J2 League	25	4	0	0	–		25	4
2019	Matsumoto Yamaga FC	J1 League								
Total			153	22	15	2	3	0	170	24

^{1}Includes J1 Promotion Playoffs.
