= Keita Takahata =

Japanese footballer

Keita Takahata 高畑 奎汰
Personal information
- Date of birth: 16 September 2000 (age 26)
- Place of birth: Ōita, Ōita, Japan
- Height: 1.75 m (5 ft 9 in)
- Position: Midfielder

Team information
- Current team: V-Varen Nagasaki
- Number: 17

Youth career
- Meiji SSS
- –2019: Oita Trinita

Senior career*
Years	Team	Apps	(Gls)
2019–2023	Oita Trinita	69	(5)
2019	→ Gainare Tottori (loan)	12	(1)
2024	Júbilo Iwata	12	(0)
2025–	V-Varen Nagasaki	25	(0)
- * Club domestic league appearances and goals as of 11 August 2026

Keita Takahata (高畑 奎汰, Takahata Keita; born 16 September 2000) is a Japanese footballer who playing as a midfielder and currently play for J1 League club, V-Varen Nagasaki.

== Career ==
On 27 December 2024, Takahata announcement officially transfer to J2 club, V-Varen Nagasaki from 2025 season.

== Career statistics ==
=== Club ===
As of the start from 2025 season.

Club	Season	League			National Cup		League Cup		Other		Total	
Club	Season	Division	Apps	Goals	Apps	Goals	Apps	Goals	Apps	Goals	Apps	Goals
Oita Trinita	2019	J1 League	6	0	2 (Note: Appearances in the Emperor's Cup)	0	6 (Note: Appearances in the J. League Cup)	0	0	0	14	0
Oita Trinita	2020	J1 League	3	0	0	0	3	0	0	0	6	0
Oita Trinita	2021	J1 League	9	0	3	0	4	0	0	0	16	0
Oita Trinita	2022	J2 League	13	1	0	0	1	0	0	0	14	1
Oita Trinita	2023	J2 League	38	4	0	0	–		0	0	38	4
Oita Trinita	Total		69	5	5	0	14	0	0	0	88	5
Gainare Tottori (loan)	2019	J3 League	12	1	0	0	–		0	0	12	1
Gainare Tottori (loan)	Total		12	1	0	0	–		0	0	12	1
Júbilo Iwata	2024	J1 League	12	0	1	0	1	0	0	0	14	0
Júbilo Iwata	Total		12	0	1	0	1	0	0	0	14	0
V-Varen Nagasaki	2025	J2 League	0	0	0	0	0	0	0	0	0	0
V-Varen Nagasaki	Total		0	0	0	0	0	0	0	0	0	0
Career total			93	6	6	0	15	0	0	0	114	6
