= 2017 Oita Trinita season =

Oita Trinita
2017 season
- Manager: Tomohiro Katanosaka
- Stadium: Oita Bank Dome
- J2 League: 9th

2017 Oita Trinita season.

== J2 League ==
=== League table ===
Pos	Team	Pld	W	D	L	GF	GA	GD	Pts
8	Matsumoto Yamaga	42	19	9	14	61	45	+16	66
9	Oita Trinita	42	17	13	12	58	50	+8	64
10	Yokohama FC	42	17	12	13	60	49	+11	63

Updated to match(es) played on 28 November 2017. Source: 2017 MEIJI YASUDA J2 LEAGUE League table
Rules for classification: 1) Points; 2) Goal difference; 3) Goals scored

=== Match details ===
J2 League match details
Match	Date	Team	Score	Team	Venue	Attendance
1	2017.02.26	Avispa Fukuoka	1-2	Oita Trinita	Level5 Stadium	15,042
2	2017.03.05	Tokyo Verdy	1-0	Oita Trinita	Ajinomoto Stadium	5,749
3	2017.03.12	Oita Trinita	2-0	Renofa Yamaguchi FC	Oita Bank Dome	11,370
4	2017.03.18	Oita Trinita	0-1	Tokushima Vortis	Oita Bank Dome	7,150
5	2017.03.26	Roasso Kumamoto	0-1	Oita Trinita	Egao Kenko Stadium	10,056
6	2017.04.01	Oita Trinita	1-1	Ehime FC	Oita Bank Dome	6,788
7	2017.04.09	Montedio Yamagata	3-2	Oita Trinita	ND Soft Stadium Yamagata	4,822
8	2017.04.15	Oita Trinita	1-0	Zweigen Kanazawa	Oita Bank Dome	6,136
9	2017.04.22	Shonan Bellmare	0-1	Oita Trinita	Shonan BMW Stadium Hiratsuka	7,101
10	2017.04.29	Oita Trinita	1-3	Kyoto Sanga FC	Oita Bank Dome	7,334
11	2017.05.03	Oita Trinita	0-0	Matsumoto Yamaga FC	Oita Bank Dome	8,415
12	2017.05.07	FC Gifu	1-2	Oita Trinita	Gifu Nagaragawa Stadium	7,008
13	2017.05.13	Oita Trinita	4-1	Nagoya Grampus	Oita Bank Dome	8,024
14	2017.05.17	V-Varen Nagasaki	2-1	Oita Trinita	Transcosmos Stadium Nagasaki	3,307
15	2017.05.21	FC Machida Zelvia	2-2	Oita Trinita	Machida Stadium	3,528
16	2017.05.28	Oita Trinita	1-1	Fagiano Okayama	Oita Bank Dome	7,030
17	2017.06.03	Mito HollyHock	2-0	Oita Trinita	K's denki Stadium Mito	3,778
18	2017.06.10	Oita Trinita	2-2	Yokohama FC	Oita Bank Dome	11,050
19	2017.06.17	Oita Trinita	2-1	Kamatamare Sanuki	Oita Bank Dome	6,901
20	2017.06.25	Thespakusatsu Gunma	0-4	Oita Trinita	Shoda Shoyu Stadium Gunma	3,421
21	2017.07.01	JEF United Chiba	4-1	Oita Trinita	Fukuda Denshi Arena	9,298
22	2017.07.08	Oita Trinita	0-0	Shonan Bellmare	Oita Bank Dome	8,827
23	2017.07.16	Ehime FC	2-2	Oita Trinita	Ningineer Stadium	4,011
24	2017.07.22	Oita Trinita	0-0	Mito HollyHock	Oita Bank Dome	7,443
25	2017.07.29	Kamatamare Sanuki	0-1	Oita Trinita	Pikara Stadium	3,143
26	2017.08.05	Yokohama FC	1-2	Oita Trinita	NHK Spring Mitsuzawa Football Stadium	5,359
27	2017.08.11	Oita Trinita	1-3	FC Machida Zelvia	Oita Bank Dome	9,525
28	2017.08.16	Oita Trinita	0-2	Tokyo Verdy	Oita Bank Dome	6,440
29	2017.08.20	Kyoto Sanga FC	2-2	Oita Trinita	Kyoto Nishikyogoku Athletic Stadium	4,966
30	2017.08.26	Renofa Yamaguchi FC	2-3	Oita Trinita	Ishin Memorial Park Stadium	6,867
31	2017.09.02	Oita Trinita	1-0	Thespakusatsu Gunma	Oita Bank Dome	7,418
32	2017.09.09	Nagoya Grampus	0-1	Oita Trinita	Paloma Mizuho Stadium	9,858
33	2017.09.16	Oita Trinita	1-2	V-Varen Nagasaki	Oita Bank Dome	6,265
34	2017.09.24	Zweigen Kanazawa	1-1	Oita Trinita	Ishikawa Athletics Stadium	4,193
35	2017.10.01	Fagiano Okayama	0-3	Oita Trinita	City Light Stadium	9,858
36	2017.10.08	Oita Trinita	3-3	FC Gifu	Oita Bank Dome	7,121
37	2017.10.14	Oita Trinita	1-1	Avispa Fukuoka	Oita Bank Dome	8,767
38	2017.10.21	Matsumoto Yamaga FC	0-2	Oita Trinita	Matsumotodaira Park Stadium	9,246
39	2017.10.28	Oita Trinita	1-2	JEF United Chiba	Oita Bank Dome	7,356
40	2017.11.05	Oita Trinita	1-1	Montedio Yamagata	Oita Bank Dome	9,822
41	2017.11.11	Tokushima Vortis	1-0	Oita Trinita	Pocarisweat Stadium	6,968
42	2017.11.19	Oita Trinita	2-1	Roasso Kumamoto	Oita Bank Dome	10,146
