= Naoki Nomura =

Japanese footballer

Naoki Nomura 野村 直輝
Personal information
- Full name: Naoki Nomura
- Date of birth: 17 April 1991 (age 35)
- Place of birth: Shimonoseki, Japan
- Height: 1.68 m (5 ft 6 in)
- Position: Midfielder

Team information
- Current team: Renofa Yamaguchi FC
- Number: 88

Youth career
- 2007–2009: Shimonoseki Chuo Kogyo High School

College career
Years	Team	Apps	(Gls)
2010–2013	Japan University of Economics		

Senior career*
Years	Team	Apps	(Gls)
2014–2018	Yokohama FC	138	(19)
2019	Tokushima Vortis	41	(7)
2020–2025	Oita Trinita	155	(18)
2026–	Renofa Yamaguchi FC	2	(0)
- * Club domestic league appearances and goals as of 21 August 2026

Naoki Nomura (野村 直輝, Nomura Naoki; born 17 April 1991 in Shimonoseki) is a Japanese footballer who plays for Renofa Yamaguchi FC.

== Club statistics ==
Updated to end of 2019 season.

Club performance			League		Cup		League Cup		Other		Total	
Season	Club	League	Apps	Goals	Apps	Goals	Apps	Goals	Apps	Goals	Apps	Goals
Japan			League		Emperor's Cup		J. League Cup		Other^{1}		Total	
2014	Yokohama FC	J2 League	18	3	1	0	-		-		19	3
2015	Yokohama FC	J2 League	11	1	0	0	-		-		11	1
2016	Yokohama FC	J2 League	38	4	1	1	-		-		39	5
2017	Yokohama FC	J2 League	35	6	0	0	-		-		35	6
2018	Yokohama FC	J2 League	36	5	0	0	-		1	0	37	5
2019	Tokushima Vortis	J2 League	39	7	0	0	-		3	0	42	7
Career total			177	26	2	1	0	0	4	0	183	27

^{1}includes J1/J2 Play-Offs.
