= Park Seong-su =

South Korean footballer

Park Seong-su 박성수
Personal information
- Full name: Park Seong-su
- Date of birth: May 12, 1996 (age 30)
- Place of birth: Hanam, South Korea
- Height: 1.92 m (6 ft 3 1/2 in)
- Position: Goalkeeper

Team information
- Current team: Daegu FC
- Number: 13

Youth career
- 2009–2011: Daewol Middle School
- 2012–2014: Hanam FC
- 2014: Jingeon JKFC

Senior career*
| Years | Team | Apps | (Gls) |
| 2015–2020 | Ehime FC | 41 | (0) |
| 2020 | → FC Gifu (loan) | 13 | (0) |
| 2021 | Daegu FC | 0 | (0) |
| 2022–2024 | FC Anyang | 25 | (0) |
| 2024 | FC Ryukyu | 3 | (0) |
| 2025 | Mokpo | 20 | (0) |
| 2026– | Daegu FC | 0 | (0) |
- * Club domestic league appearances and goals as of 5 August 2026

Park Seong-su (Korean: 박성수; born May 12, 1996) is a South Korean professional footballer who plays as a goalkeeper for Daegu FC.

== Career ==
Park Seong-su joined J2 League club Ehime FC in 2015.

== Club statistics ==
Updated to 1 January 2020.

| Club performance | | | League | | Cup | | Total | |
| Season | Club | League | Apps | Goals | Apps | Goals | Apps | Goals |
| Japan | | | League | | Emperor's Cup | | Total | |
|---|---|---|---|---|---|---|---|---|
| 2015 | Ehime FC | J2 League | 0 | 0 | 0 | 0 | 0 | 0 |
| 2016 | Ehime FC | J2 League | 0 | 0 | 0 | 0 | 0 | 0 |
| 2017 | Ehime FC | J2 League | 41 | 0 | 0 | 0 | 41 | 0 |
| 2018 | Ehime FC | J2 League | 0 | 0 | 0 | 0 | 0 | 0 |
| 2019 | Ehime FC | J2 League | 0 | 0 | 0 | 0 | 0 | 0 |
| Total | | | 41 | 0 | 0 | 0 | 41 | 0 |
