= 2014 Oita Trinita season =

Oita Trinita
2014 season
- Manager: Kazuaki Tasaka
- Stadium: Oita Bank Dome
- J2 League: 7th

2014 Oita Trinita season.

== J2 League ==
Match	Date	Team	Score	Team	Venue	Attendance
1	2014.03.02	Mito HollyHock	2-1	Oita Trinita	K's denki Stadium Mito	4,280
2	2014.03.09	Oita Trinita	1-0	Giravanz Kitakyushu	Oita Bank Dome	8,843
3	2014.03.16	Oita Trinita	1-0	Kamatamare Sanuki	Oita Bank Dome	7,053
4	2014.03.22	Roasso Kumamoto	1-1	Oita Trinita	Umakana-Yokana Stadium	9,492
5	2014.03.30	Fagiano Okayama	1-1	Oita Trinita	Kanko Stadium	6,401
6	2014.04.05	Oita Trinita	0-3	Kyoto Sanga FC	Oita Bank Dome	6,108
7	2014.04.13	Oita Trinita	1-0	Consadole Sapporo	Oita Bank Dome	6,072
8	2014.04.20	Shonan Bellmare	4-0	Oita Trinita	Shonan BMW Stadium Hiratsuka	7,039
9	2014.04.26	Oita Trinita	3-0	Kataller Toyama	Oita Bank Dome	5,971
10	2014.04.29	V-Varen Nagasaki	0-0	Oita Trinita	Nagasaki Stadium	6,121
11	2014.05.03	Avispa Fukuoka	1-2	Oita Trinita	Level5 Stadium	6,614
12	2014.05.06	Oita Trinita	0-2	Matsumoto Yamaga FC	Oita Bank Dome	11,650
13	2014.05.11	Júbilo Iwata	1-1	Oita Trinita	Yamaha Stadium	7,739
14	2014.05.18	Oita Trinita	1-0	Yokohama FC	Oita Bank Dome	7,034
15	2014.05.24	Tokyo Verdy	1-1	Oita Trinita	Ajinomoto Stadium	3,250
16	2014.05.31	Oita Trinita	1-0	Montedio Yamagata	Oita Bank Dome	5,824
17	2014.06.07	Oita Trinita	1-0	FC Gifu	Oita Bank Dome	9,267
18	2014.06.14	Tochigi SC	4-0	Oita Trinita	Tochigi Green Stadium	4,319
19	2014.06.21	Oita Trinita	2-2	Ehime FC	Oita Bank Dome	10,102
20	2014.06.28	Thespakusatsu Gunma	2-1	Oita Trinita	Shoda Shoyu Stadium Gunma	3,795
21	2014.07.05	Oita Trinita	2-4	JEF United Chiba	Oita Bank Dome	6,727
22	2014.07.20	Consadole Sapporo	1-1	Oita Trinita	Sapporo Dome	20,633
23	2014.07.26	Giravanz Kitakyushu	1-1	Oita Trinita	Honjo Stadium	4,630
24	2014.07.30	Oita Trinita	2-1	Tochigi SC	Oita Bank Dome	5,028
25	2014.08.03	Montedio Yamagata	2-0	Oita Trinita	ND Soft Stadium Yamagata	4,430
26	2014.08.10	Oita Trinita	3-2	Tokyo Verdy	Oita Bank Dome	7,563
27	2014.08.17	Kyoto Sanga FC	2-2	Oita Trinita	Kyoto Nishikyogoku Athletic Stadium	5,266
28	2014.08.24	Oita Trinita	2-1	Thespakusatsu Gunma	Oita Bank Dome	8,087
29	2014.08.31	Ehime FC	1-2	Oita Trinita	Ningineer Stadium	2,730
30	2014.09.06	Oita Trinita	0-1	Roasso Kumamoto	Oita Bank Dome	20,636
31	2014.09.14	Kataller Toyama	1-1	Oita Trinita	Toyama Stadium	3,624
32	2014.09.20	Oita Trinita	3-0	Avispa Fukuoka	Oita Bank Dome	7,731
33	2014.09.23	Yokohama FC	1-1	Oita Trinita	NHK Spring Mitsuzawa Football Stadium	5,288
34	2014.09.28	Oita Trinita	1-1	V-Varen Nagasaki	Oita Bank Dome	8,212
35	2014.10.04	Oita Trinita	2-0	Júbilo Iwata	Oita Bank Dome	7,236
36	2014.10.11	Matsumoto Yamaga FC	2-0	Oita Trinita	Matsumotodaira Park Stadium	11,238
37	2014.10.19	JEF United Chiba	2-1	Oita Trinita	Fukuda Denshi Arena	10,326
38	2014.10.26	Oita Trinita	1-0	Fagiano Okayama	Oita Bank Dome	7,267
39	2014.11.01	FC Gifu	2-3	Oita Trinita	Gifu Nagaragawa Stadium	4,190
40	2014.11.09	Oita Trinita	2-3	Mito HollyHock	Oita Bank Dome	7,678
41	2014.11.15	Kamatamare Sanuki	0-1	Oita Trinita	Kagawa Marugame Stadium	2,750
42	2014.11.23	Oita Trinita	2-3	Shonan Bellmare	Oita Bank Dome	12,770
