= 2016 Oita Trinita season =

Oita Trinita
2016 season
- Manager: Tomohiro Katanosaka
- Stadium: Oita Bank Dome
- J3 League: 1st

2016 Oita Trinita season.

== J3 League ==
=== League table ===
Pos	Team	Pld	W	D	L	GF	GA	GD	Pts	Qualification or relegation
1	Oita Trinita (C, P)	30	19	4	7	50	24	+26	61	Promotion to 2017 J2 League
2	Tochigi SC	30	17	8	5	38	20	+18	59	Qualification to J2 promotion playoffs (Note: Only teams that hold a J2 license are eligible for promotion.)
3	Nagano Parceiro	30	15	7	8	33	22	+11	52	
4	Blaublitz Akita	30	14	8	8	37	26	+11	50	
5	Kagoshima United	30	15	5	10	39	29	+10	50	
6	Kataller Toyama	30	13	10	7	37	29	+8	49	

Updated to match(es) played on 20 November 2016. Source: 2016 MEIJI YASUDA J3 LEAGUE League table
Rules for classification: 1) Points; 2) Goal difference; 3) Goals scored; 4th) head-to-head results; 5th) disciplinary points; 6th) draw
(C) Champions; (P) Promoted

=== Match details ===
J3 League match details
Match	Date	Team	Score	Team	Venue	Attendance
1	2016.03.13	Oita Trinita	1-0	AC Nagano Parceiro	Oita Bank Dome	9,189
2	2016.03.19	Kagoshima United FC	0-1	Oita Trinita	Kagoshima Kamoike Stadium	3,920
3	2016.04.03	Oita Trinita	2-1	Gainare Tottori	Oita Bank Dome	7,532
4	2016.04.10	FC Ryukyu	1-0	Oita Trinita	Okinawa Athletic Park Stadium	1,424
6	2016.04.23	Gamba Osaka U-23	2-2	Oita Trinita	Expo '70 Commemorative Stadium	1,711
7	2016.05.01	Oita Trinita	0-1	Kataller Toyama	Oita Bank Dome	8,313
8	2016.05.08	Tochigi SC	2-1	Oita Trinita	Tochigi Green Stadium	4,330
9	2016.05.15	Oita Trinita	3-0	FC Tokyo U-23	Oita Bank Dome	6,232
10	2016.05.22	Cerezo Osaka U-23	2-1	Oita Trinita	Kincho Stadium	1,685
11	2016.05.29	Fujieda MYFC	0-2	Oita Trinita	Fujieda Soccer Stadium	1,587
5	2016.06.05	Oita Trinita	1-0	Fukushima United FC	Oita Bank Dome	5,408
12	2016.06.12	Oita Trinita	3-0	SC Sagamihara	Oita Bank Dome	7,314
13	2016.06.19	Grulla Morioka	1-1	Oita Trinita	Iwagin Stadium	1,255
14	2016.06.26	Oita Trinita	1-0	Blaublitz Akita	Oita Bank Dome	6,733
15	2016.07.03	YSCC Yokohama	1-0	Oita Trinita	NHK Spring Mitsuzawa Football Stadium	1,313
16	2016.07.10	Oita Trinita	2-2	FC Ryukyu	Oita Bank Dome	7,051
17	2016.07.16	Oita Trinita	4-3	Fujieda MYFC	Oita Bank Dome	5,972
18	2016.07.24	FC Tokyo U-23	1-2	Oita Trinita	Yumenoshima Stadium	2,452
19	2016.07.31	Oita Trinita	0-1	Tochigi SC	Oita Bank Dome	9,271
20	2016.08.07	Fukushima United FC	1-4	Oita Trinita	Toho Stadium	1,146
21	2016.09.11	SC Sagamihara	0-3	Oita Trinita	Sagamihara Gion Stadium	7,582
22	2016.09.19	Oita Trinita	2-0	Cerezo Osaka U-23	Oita Bank Dome	8,256
23	2016.09.25	Kataller Toyama	0-0	Oita Trinita	Toyama Stadium	4,760
24	2016.10.02	Oita Trinita	1-0	Kagoshima United FC	Oita Bank Dome	8,426
25	2016.10.16	AC Nagano Parceiro	1-0	Oita Trinita	Minami Nagano Sports Park Stadium	5,137
26	2016.10.23	Oita Trinita	4-2	Grulla Morioka	Oita Bank Dome	7,680
27	2016.10.30	Blaublitz Akita	0-1	Oita Trinita	Akigin Stadium	1,931
28	2016.11.06	Oita Trinita	1-0	Gamba Osaka U-23	Oita Bank Dome	8,121
29	2016.11.13	Oita Trinita	3-0	YSCC Yokohama	Oita Bank Dome	11,065
30	2016.11.20	Gainare Tottori	2-4	Oita Trinita	Tottori Bank Bird Stadium	3,450
