= Ren Ikeda =

Japanese footballer

Personal information
- Date of birth: 10 November 1997 (age 29)
- Place of birth: Chiba, Japan
- Height: 1.77 m (5 ft 10 in)
- Position: Midfielder

Team information
- Current team: FC Ryukyu
- Number: 46

Youth career
- Funabashi Kaijin SC
- –2012: FC Narashino
- 2013–2015: Narashino High School

College career
| Years | Team | Apps | (Gls) |
| 2016–2019 | Takushoku University | | |

Senior career*
| Years | Team | Apps | (Gls) |
| 2020–2023 | FC Ryukyu | 110 | (11) |
| 2023–2025 | Oita Trinita | 46 | (1) |
| 2026– | FC Ryukyu | 19 | (0) |
- * Club domestic league appearances and goals as of 25 August 2026

Ren Ikeda (池田 廉, Ikeda Ren; born 10 November 1997) is a Japanese footballer who plays as a midfielder for J3 League club FC Ryukyu.

== Career ==
Ren made his league debut for Ryukyu against JEF United on the 23 February 2020. He scored his first league goal for the club against V-Varen Nagasaki on the 15 July 2020, scoring in the 70th minute.

Ren made his league debut for Oita against Ventforet Kofu on the 4 June 2023.

== Career statistics ==
=== Club ===
As of 10 November 2020.

| Club | Season | League | | | National Cup | | League Cup | | Continental | | Other | | Total | |
| Club | Season | Division | Apps | Goals | Apps | Goals | Apps | Goals | Apps | Goals | Apps | Goals | Apps | Goals |
|---|---|---|---|---|---|---|---|---|---|---|---|---|---|---|
| FC Ryukyu | 2020 | J2 League | 28 | 2 | 0 | 0 | 0 | 0 | 0 | 0 | 0 | 0 | 28 | 2 |
| Career total | | | 28 | 2 | 0 | 0 | 0 | 0 | 0 | 0 | 0 | 0 | 28 | 2 |
