= Yūsei Yashiki =

Japanese footballer

Yūsei Yashiki 屋敷 優成
Personal information
- Full name: Yūsei Yashiki
- Date of birth: 18 October 2003 (age 23)
- Place of birth: Nakatsu, Ōita, Japan
- Height: 1.64 m (5 ft 5 in)
- Position: Midfielder

Team information
- Current team: FC Gifu(on loan from Oita Trinita)
- Number: 50

Youth career
- –2020: Oita Trinita

Senior career*
Years	Team	Apps	(Gls)
2020–	Oita Trinita	40	(0)
2026–	→ FC Gifu (loan)	1	(0)

International career^{‡}
2018	Japan U15		
2020	Japan U17		
- * Club domestic league appearances and goals as of 17 August 2026 ‡ National team caps and goals as of 17:04, 28 March 2021 (UTC)

Yūsei Yashiki (屋敷 優成, Yashiki Yūsei; born 18 October 2003) is a Japanese footballer currently playing as a forward for FC Gifu, on loan from Oita Trinita.

Yashiki became the youngest ever player to debut for Oita Trinita, and has continued to play for the club since then, becoming a full member of the first team. After suffering an ACL injury in July 2023, he returned a year later in September 2024 and helped Oita Trinita avoid relegation.

== Career ==
Born in Nakatsu, on 17 July 2020, Yashiki, along with his teammate Yuya Tanaka, were registered as type-2 players. On 12 August 2020, he started the match against Kashiwa Reysol in the J.League Cup, becoming the youngest player to debut for the club, breaking Hirotaka Tameda's record.

On 26 February 2021, Yashiki was again registered as a type-2 player, this time for the 2021 season. He made his league debut for the club against Cerezo Osaka on 17 March 2021. On 20 May 2021, it was announced he would be promoted to the first team next season. In July 2023, he was side-lined with an ACL injury that would keep him out for a year. He made his return to football over a year later on 7 September 2024, during the team's relegation fight. He helped contribute to the team avoiding relegation and won the Meiji Yasuda J.League Monthly Young Player Award for November/December in December 2024.

== International career ==
In February 2021, Yashiki was called up to the Japan U17 squad for the JENESYS2019 Youth Football Exchange Tournament.

Yashiki was called up to the Japan U-20 squad for the 2023 FIFA U-20 World Cup.

== Career statistics ==
=== Club ===
As of 4 May 2021.

Club	Season	League			National Cup		League Cup		Other		Total	
Club	Season	Division	Apps	Goals	Apps	Goals	Apps	Goals	Apps	Goals	Apps	Goals
Oita Trinita	2020	J1 League	0	0	0	0	1 (Note: Appearances in the J. League Cup)	0	0	0	1	0
Oita Trinita	2021	J1 League	2	0	0	0	3	0	0	0	5	0
Career total			2	0	0	0	4	0	0	0	6	0
