= Josei Sato =

Japanese footballer

Personal information
- Date of birth: 28 October 2004 (age 21)
- Place of birth: Ōita, Japan
- Height: 1.72 m (5 ft 8 in)
- Position: Midfielder

Team information
- Current team: Kochi United SC (on loan from Oita Trinita)
- Number: 77

Youth career
- –2019: Catiolla FC
- 2020–2022: Oita Trinita

Senior career*
Years	Team	Apps	(Gls)
2021–	Oita Trinita	6	(0)
2026–	→ Kochi United SC (loan)	2	(0)
- * Club domestic league appearances and goals as of 21 August 2026

Josei Sato (佐藤 丈晟, Sato Josei; born 28 October 2004) is a Japanese footballer currently playing as a midfielder for Kochi United SC, on loan from Oita Trinita.

== Club career ==
Sato made his professional debut for Oita Trinita in a 2–1 Emperor's Cup win against Thespakusatsu Gunma.

== Career statistics ==
=== Club ===
As of 19 August 2021.

Club	Season	League			National Cup		League Cup		Other		Total	
Club	Season	Division	Apps	Goals	Apps	Goals	Apps	Goals	Apps	Goals	Apps	Goals
Oita Trinita	2021	J1 League	0	0	1 (Note: Appearances in the Emperor's Cup)	0	0	0	0	0	1	0
Career total			0	0	1	0	0	0	0	0	1	0
