= Kim Hyun-woo =

Kim Hyun-woo may refer to:

- Kim Hyun-woo (reporter) (born 1979), South Korean journalist
- Kim Hyeon-woo (born 1980), South Korean sport wrestler
- Hyun Woo (born 1985), South Korean actor
- Kim Hyun-woo (footballer, born 1989), South Korean association football player
- Kim Hyun-woo (footballer, born 1999), South Korean association football player
