= Shinya Utsumoto =

Japanese footballer

Personal information
- Date of birth: 29 March 2000 (age 26)
- Place of birth: Miyazaki, Japan
- Height: 1.76 m (5 ft 9 in)
- Position: Forward

Team information
- Current team: Oita Trinita
- Number: 14

Youth career
- Takajo SSS
- –2014: Takajo Junior High School
- 2015–2017: Hosho High School

College career
Years	Team	Apps	(Gls)
2018–2022	Miyazaki Sangyo-keiei University		

Senior career*
Years	Team	Apps	(Gls)
2021–	Oita Trinita	118	(6)
- * Club domestic league appearances and goals as of 16 August 2026

Shinya Utsumoto (宇津元 伸弥, Utsumoto Shinya; born 29 March 2000) is a Japanese footballer currently playing as a forward for Oita Trinita.

== Career ==
Utsumoto was a designated special player.

== Career statistics ==
=== Club ===
As of 5 May 2021.

Club	Season	League			National Cup		League Cup		Other		Total	
Club	Season	Division	Apps	Goals	Apps	Goals	Apps	Goals	Apps	Goals	Apps	Goals
Oita Trinita	2021	J1 League	0	0	0	0	1 (Note: Appearances in the J.League Cup)	0	0	0	0	0
Career total			0	0	0	0	1	0	0	0	1	0
