= Masaki Yumiba =

Japanese footballer

Personal information
- Date of birth: 13 May 2002 (age 24)
- Place of birth: Ōita, Ōita, Japan
- Height: 1.73 m (5 ft 8 in)
- Position: Midfielder

Team information
- Current team: Shimizu S-Pulse
- Number: 17

Youth career
- –2020: Oita Trinita

Senior career*
Years	Team	Apps	(Gls)
2020–2024	Oita Trinita	94	(8)
2025–	Shimizu S-Pulse	21	(1)
- * Club domestic league appearances and goals as of 10 August 2026

Masaki Yumiba (弓場 将輝, Yumiba Masaki; born 13 May 2002) is a Japanese footballer who plays as a midfielder for Shimizu S-Pulse.

== Career statistics ==
=== Club ===
As of match played 10 November 2024.

Appearances and goals by club, season and competition
Club	Season	League			National Cup		League Cup		Other		Total	
Club	Season	Division	Apps	Goals	Apps	Goals	Apps	Goals	Apps	Goals	Apps	Goals
Oita Trinita	2020	J1 League	0	0	—		1	0	—		1	0
Oita Trinita	2021	J1 League	0	0	2	0	4	1	—		6	1
Oita Trinita	2022	J2 League	25	3	1	0	6	0	1	0	33	3
Oita Trinita	2023	J2 League	37	4	1	0	—		—		38	4
Oita Trinita	2024	J2 League	32	1	2	0	1	0	—		35	1
Oita Trinita	Total		94	8	4	0	12	1	1	0	111	9
Career total			94	8	4	0	12	1	1	0	111	9
