= Kohei Isa =

Japanese footballer (born 1991)

Kohei Isa 伊佐 耕平
Personal information
- Full name: Kohei Isa
- Date of birth: 23 November 1991 (age 34)
- Place of birth: Hyōgo, Japan
- Height: 1.70 m (5 ft 7 in)
- Position: Forward

Team information
- Current team: FC Osaka
- Number: 95

Youth career
- 2007–2009: Kobe Kagaku Gijutsu High School

College career
Years	Team	Apps	(Gls)
2010–2013	Osaka University of H&SS		

Senior career*
Years	Team	Apps	(Gls)
2014–2026	Oita Trinita	318	(33)
2026–	FC Osaka	2	(0)
- * Club domestic league appearances and goals as of 18 August 2026

Kohei Isa (伊佐 耕平, Isa Kōhei; born 23 November 1991 in Hyōgo) is a Japanese footballer who plays as a forward for FC Osaka.

== Club statistics ==
Updated to 25 February 2019.

Club	Season	League			Emperor's Cup		J.League Cup		Total	
Club	Season	Division	Apps	Goals	Apps	Goals	Apps	Goals	Apps	Goals
Oita Trinita	2014	J2 League	15	0	2	0	—		17	0
Oita Trinita	2015	J2 League	30	3	1	1	—		31	4
Oita Trinita	2016	J3 League	16	4	1	0	—		17	4
Oita Trinita	2017	J2 League	39	9	2	2	—		41	11
Oita Trinita	2018	J2 League	34	4	0	0	—		34	4
Career total			134	20	6	3	0	0	140	23
