= Nobuaki Yanagida =

Japanese footballer and manager

Nobuaki Yanagida 柳田 伸明
Personal information
- Full name: Nobuaki Yanagida
- Date of birth: December 9, 1970 (age 55)
- Place of birth: Tokyo, Japan
- Position: Midfielder

Youth career
- 1989–1992: Soka University

Senior career*
Years	Team	Apps	(Gls)
1993–1995	Fujitsu		
1997–1998	Mito HollyHock	12	(0)
Total		12+	(0+)

Managerial career
- 2015: Oita Trinita
- * Club domestic league appearances and goals

Nobuaki Yanagida (柳田 伸明, Yanagida Nobuaki; born December 9, 1970) is a former Japanese football player and manager.

== Playing career ==
Yanagida was born in Tokyo on December 9, 1970. After graduating from Soka University, he played for Fujitsu (1993–1995) and Mito HollyHock (1997–1998) as midfielder.

== Coaching career ==
In 1999, Yanagida became coach for Mito HollyHock. In 2000, he moved to Oita Trinita. He mainly served as a coach for top team and youth team for long time. In June 2015, top team manager Kazuaki Tasaka was sacked for poor results when Trinita was at the bottom place of 22 clubs in J2 League. Yanagida became a new manager as Tasaka successor. However Trinita finished at the 21st place and was relegated to J3 League. He also resigned end of 2015 season.

== Club statistics ==
Club performance			League		Cup		League Cup		Total	
Season	Club	League	Apps	Goals	Apps	Goals	Apps	Goals	Apps	Goals
Japan			League		Emperor's Cup		J.League Cup		Total	
1997	Mito HollyHock	Football League	7	0	0	0	-		7	0
1998	Mito HollyHock	Football League	5	0	0	0	-		5	0
Country	Japan		12	0	0	0	0	0	12	0
Total			12	0	0	0	0	0	12	0

== Managerial statistics ==
Team	From	To	Record				
Team	From	To	G	W	D	L	Win %
Oita Trinita	2015	2015	26	6	9	11	23.08
Total			26	6	9	11	23.08
