= Shun Takagi =

Japanese footballer (born 1989)

Shun Takagi 高木駿
Personal information
- Full name: Shun Takagi
- Date of birth: 22 May 1989 (age 37)
- Place of birth: Fujisawa, Kanagawa, Japan
- Height: 1.81 m (5 ft 11 in)
- Position: Goalkeeper

Team information
- Current team: Hokkaido Consadole Sapporo
- Number: 51

Youth career
- Honcho SC
- 2000–2007: Tokyo Verdy

College career
Years	Team	Apps	(Gls)
2008–2011	Meiji University		

Senior career*
Years	Team	Apps	(Gls)
2012–2016	Kawasaki Frontale	2	(0)
2014–2015	→ JEF United Chiba (loan)	40	(0)
2017–2023	Oita Trinita	148	(0)
2023–	Hokkaido Consadole Sapporo	24	(0)
Medal record
Kawasaki Frontale
Runner-up	Emperor's Cup	2016
- * Club domestic league appearances and goals as of 1 January 2026

Shun Takagi (高木駿, Takagi, Shun; born 22 May 1989 in Fujisawa, Kanagawa) is a Japanese footballer who plays for J1 League club Hokkaido Consadole Sapporo.

== Early life ==
Shun was born in Fujisawa. He played for Meiji University FC.

== Career ==
Shun made his debut for Kawasaki against Yokohama F. Marinos on 25 September 2016.

Shun made his debut for JEF against Tokyo Verdy on 28 September 2014.

Shun made his debut for Oita against Avispa Fukuoka on 26 February 2017.

Shun made his debut for Consadole against Kawasaki Frontale on 26 August 2023.

== Club statistics ==
Updated to 1 August 2022.

Club performance			League		Cup		League Cup		Total	
Season	Club	League	Apps	Goals	Apps	Goals	Apps	Goals	Apps	Goals
Japan			League		Emperor's Cup		J. League Cup		Total	
2012	Kawasaki Frontale	J1 League	0	0	0	0	0	0	0	0
2013	Kawasaki Frontale	J1 League	0	0	0	0	0	0	0	0
2014	JEF United Chiba	J2 League	9	0	4	0	–		13	0
2015	JEF United Chiba	J2 League	31	0	0	0	–		31	0
2016	Kawasaki Frontale	J1 League	2	0	0	0	0	0	2	0
2017	Oita Trinita	J2 League	4	0	0	0	–		4	0
2018	Oita Trinita	J2 League	42	0	0	0	–		42	0
2019	Oita Trinita	J1 League	34	0	2	0	0	0	36	0
2020	Oita Trinita	J1 League	17	0	–		2	0	19	0
2021	Oita Trinita	J1 League	24	0	4	0	2	0	30	0
2022	Oita Trinita	J2 League	27	0	0	0	–		27	0
Career total			190	0	10	0	4	0	204	0
