= Junya Nodake =

Japanese footballer

Personal information
- Full name: Junya Nodake
- Date of birth: September 11, 1994 (age 32)
- Place of birth: Kagoshima City, Kagoshima Prefecture, Japan
- Height: 1.76 m (5 ft 9 1/2 in)
- Position: Forward

Team information
- Current team: Thespa Gunma
- Number: 28

Youth career
- 2010–2012: Kamimura Gakuen High School

College career
Years	Team	Apps	(Gls)
2013–2016	Fukuoka University		

Senior career*
Years	Team	Apps	(Gls)
2017–2021	Kagoshima United FC	59	(3)
2021–2026	Oita Trinita	110	(1)
2026–	Thespa Gunma	1	(0)
- * Club domestic league appearances and goals as of 25 August 2026

Junya Nodake (野嶽 惇也, Nodake Jun'ya; born September 11, 1994) is a Japanese football player. He plays for Thespa Gunma.

His younger brother Hiroya is also a professional footballer currently playing for J2 League side Kagoshima United FC.

== Career ==
Junya Nodake joined J3 League club Kagoshima United FC in 2017.

== Career statistics ==
Updated to 22 February 2018.

Appearances and goals by club, season and competition
Club	Season	League			Emperor's Cup		Total	
Club	Season	Division	Apps	Goals	Apps	Goals	Apps	Goals
Kagoshima United FC	2017	J3 League	27	2	2	0	29	2
Career total			27	2	2	0	29	2
