= Matheus Pereira (footballer, born 1997) =

Brazilian footballer

Personal information
- Full name: Matheus Sousa Pereira
- Date of birth: 31 January 1997 (age 29)
- Place of birth: Rio de Janeiro, Brazil
- Height: 1.84 m (6 ft 0 in)
- Position: Midfielder

Team information
- Current team: Oita Trinita
- Number: 31

Youth career
- –2017: Figueirense

Senior career*
Years	Team	Apps	(Gls)
2017–2020	Figueirense	115	(2)
2020–2022	Atlético Goianiense	11	(1)
2021–2022	→ Oita Trinita (loan)	44	(5)
2023–	Oita Trinita	112	(4)
- * Club domestic league appearances and goals as of 16 August 2026

Matheus Sousa Pereira (born 31 January 1997) is a Brazilian footballer who currently plays as a midfielder for Oita Trinita.

== Career statistics ==
=== Club ===
As of 12 November 2023.

Club	Season	League			State League		Cup		League Cup		Other		Total	
Club	Season	Division	Apps	Goals	Apps	Goals	Apps	Goals	Apps	Goals	Apps	Goals	Apps	Goals
Figueirense	2017	Série B	15	0	2 (Note: Appearances in the Campeonato Catarinense)	0	0	0	—		—		17	0
Figueirense	2018	Série B	20	1	10	0	3 (Note: Appearances in the Copa do Brasil)	0	—		—		33	1
Figueirense	2019	Série B	25	0	17	0	2	0	—		—		44	0
Figueirense	2020	Série B	18	1	8	0	4	0	—		—		30	1
Figueirense	Total		78	2	37	0	9	0	0	0	0	0	124	2
Atlético Goianiense	2020	Série A	10	1	1 (Note: Appearances in the Campeonato Goiano)	0	0	0	—		2 (Note: Appearances in the Copa Verde)	2	13	3
Oita Trinita (loan)	2021	J1 League	8	0	–		1	0	6	1	—		15	1
Oita Trinita (loan)	2022	J2 League	36	5	–		0	0	0	0	1 (Note: Appearances in the J2 League Play Off)	1	37	6
Oita Trinita (loan)	Total		44	5	0	0	1	0	6	1	1	1	52	7
Oita Trinita	2023	J2 League	32	2	–		0	0	—		—		32	2
Career total			164	10	38	0	10	0	6	1	3	3	221	14
