= 2015 J2 League =

Season of Japanese second-tier football

Meiji Yasuda J2 League
- Season: 2015
- Champions: Omiya Ardija
- Promoted: Omiya Ardija Júbilo Iwata Avispa Fukuoka
- Relegated: Oita Trinita Tochigi SC
- Matches: 462
- Goals: 1,014 (2.19 per match)
- Top goalscorer: Jay Bothroyd (20 goals)
- Highest attendance: 20,234 (Consadole vs Tochigi SC, 23 November)
- Lowest attendance: 1,227 (Zweigen vs Ehime FC, 1 April)
- Average attendance: 6,845

The 2015 Meiji Yasuda J2 League (2015 明治安田生命J2リーグ) season was the 44th season of the second-tier club football in Japan and the 17th season since the establishment of J2 League. The season began on 8 March 2015 and ended on 23 November 2015. This was first season of J2 League as renamed from J. League Division 2.

== Clubs ==
Shonan Bellmare have stayed in the second division for just a year, winning promotion as the champions. Matsumoto Yamaga have spent only 3 seasons in J2 after promoted from Japan Football League in 2012, becoming the first club based in Nagano Prefecture which have promoted to the top flight. Sixth-placed Montedio Yamagata won the promotion playoffs and will return in the first division after playing in the J2 for 3 years. Tokushima Vortis were relegated from the J1 immediately after their inaugural promotion, while Cerezo Osaka and Omiya Ardija have suffered relegation respectively after five and ten years from their last presence in J2.

On the other end of the table, Zweigen Kanazawa have been promoted from 2014 J3 League as the champions of the inaugural season of the J3 League, replacing relegated Kataller Toyama.

Locations of the 2015 J2 League teams

The participating clubs are listed in the following table:

Club name	Home town(s)	Note(s)
Omiya Ardija	Omiya, Saitama	Relegated from J1 League in 2014
Avispa Fukuoka	Fukuoka	
Cerezo Osaka	Osaka	Relegated from J1 League in 2014
Consadole Sapporo	Sapporo, Hokkaidō	
Ehime FC	All cities/towns in Ehime	
Fagiano Okayama	All cities/towns in Okayama	
FC Gifu	All cities/towns in Gifu	
Giravanz Kitakyushu	Kitakyushu, Fukuoka	Not eligible for J1 promotion
Mito HollyHock	Mito, Ibaraki	Not eligible for J1 promotion
JEF United Chiba	Chiba & Ichihara, Chiba	2014 J2 League play-off finalist
Júbilo Iwata	Iwata, Shizuoka	2014 J2 League play-off contestant
Kamatamare Sanuki	Takamatsu, Kagawa Kagawa	Not eligible for J1 promotion
Roasso Kumamoto	Kumamoto	
Kyoto Sanga	Southwestern cities/towns in Kyoto	
Thespakusatsu Gunma	All cities/towns in Gunma	Not eligible for J1 promotion
Tochigi SC	Utsunomiya, Tochigi	
Oita Trinita	Ōita	
V-Varen Nagasaki	All cities/towns in Nagasaki	
Tokyo Verdy	All cities/towns in Tokyo	
Tokushima Vortis	All cities/towns in Tokushima	Relegated from J1 League in 2014
Yokohama FC	Yokohama, Kanagawa	
Zweigen Kanazawa	Kanazawa	Promoted from J3 League in 2014

=== Managerial changes ===
Team	Outgoing manager	Date of separation	Manner of departure	Incoming manager	Date of announcement
Oita Trinita	(Japan) Kazuaki Tasaka	1 June	Sacked	(Japan) Nobuaki Yanagida	2 July
Mito HollyHock	(Japan) Tetsuji Hashiratani	7 June	Sacked	(Japan) Takayuki Nishigaya	27 June
Kyoto Sanga	(Japan) Masahiro Wada	10 July	Sacked	(Japan) Kiyotaka Ishimaru	10 July
Tochigi SC	(Japan) Yuji Sakakura	20 July	Resigned	(Japan) Yasuharu Kurata	21 July
Consadole Sapporo	(Croatia) Ivica Barbarić	24 July	Resigned	(Japan) Shuhei Yomoda	24 July
Yokohama FC	(Slovenia) Miloš Rus	15 September	Resigned	(Japan) Hitoshi Nakata	15 September
Cerezo Osaka	(Brazil) Paulo Autuori	17 November	Sacked	(Japan) Kiyoshi Okuma	17 November

=== Foreign players ===
Club	Player 1	Player 2	Player 3	Asian player	Non-visa foreign	Type-C contract
Omiya Ardija	(Brazil) Carlinhos Paraiba	(Brazil) Mateus	(Serbia) Dragan Mrđa			
Avispa Fukuoka	(Brazil) Moisés	(Brazil) Wellington		(South Korea) Lee Kwang-seon		
Cerezo Osaka	(Brazil) Edmílson	(Brazil) Magno Cruz	(Brazil) Pablo Felipe	(South Korea) Kim Jin-hyeon		
Consadole Sapporo	(Brazil) Nildo	(Brazil) Paulão	(Colombia) Cristian Nazarit	(South Korea) Gu Sung-yun	(Indonesia) Irfan Bachdim	
Ehime FC	(South Korea) Park Chan-yong			(South Korea) Gang Yoon-goo		(South Korea) Park Seong-su
Fagiano Okayama				(South Korea) Hwang Jin-sung		
FC Gifu	(Brazil) Gilsinho	(Brazil) Henik	(Brazil) Leo Mineiro		(North Korea) Yun Chang-su	
Giravanz Kitakyushu						
Mito HollyHock	(South Korea) Song Ju-hun			(South Korea) Park Kwang-il	(North Korea) Kim Song-gi	
JEF United Chiba	(Brazil) Paulinho	(Slovenia) Nejc Pecnik		(South Korea) Kim Hyun-hun	(North Korea) An Byong-jun	
Júbilo Iwata	(Brazil) Adaílton	(England) Jay Bothroyd	(Poland) Krzysztof Kaminski			
Kamatamare Sanuki	(Brazil) Allan	(Brazil) Evson	(France) Andrea	(South Korea) Han Chang-joo		
Roasso Kumamoto	(Brazil) Anderson	(South Korea) Kweon Han-jin		(South Korea) Kim Byeong-yeon		
Kyoto Sanga	(Brazil) Daniel Lovinho	(Brazil) Ferro	(Serbia) Miloš Bajalica	(South Korea) Kim Nam-il	(South Korea) Hwang Te-song	
Thespakusatsu Gunma	(Brazil) Acleisson	(Brazil) Hugo	(Brazil) Tanque	(South Korea) Yoon Young-seung	(North Korea) Hwang Song-su	(Brazil) Kaique
Tochigi SC	(Brazil) Jhonatan	(South Korea) Han Hee-hoon	(South Korea) Lee Joo-young	(South Korea) Park Hyung-jin		
Oita Trinita	(Brazil) Daniel	(Brazil) Evandro	(Brazil) Paulinho	(South Korea) Kim Jeong-hyun		
Tokyo Verdy	(Brazil) Alan Pinheiro	(Brazil) Bruno Coutinho	(Brazil) Weslley	(South Korea) Ko Kyung-joon		
V-Varen Nagasaki	(South Korea) Cho Min-woo			(South Korea) Lee Yong-jae	(North Korea) Ri Yong-jik	
Tokushima Vortis	(Brazil) Alex	(Colombia) Estiven	(South Korea) Kim Kyung-jung	(South Korea) Kim Jong-min		(South Korea) Son Se-hwan
Yokohama FC	(Slovenia) Rok Štraus	(South Korea) Bae Hu-min	(South Korea) Park Tae-hong	(South Korea) Na Sung-soo	(North Korea) An Yong-hak	
Zweigen Kanazawa	(Brazil) Jean Moser	(Brazil) Mendes		(South Korea) Cha Young-hwan		

== League table ==
Pos	Team	Pld	W	D	L	GF	GA	GD	Pts	Promotion, qualification or relegation
1	Omiya Ardija (C, P)	42	26	8	8	72	37	+35	86	Promotion to 2016 J1 League
2	Júbilo Iwata (P)	42	24	10	8	72	43	+29	82	Promotion to 2016 J1 League
3	Avispa Fukuoka (O, P)	42	24	10	8	63	37	+26	82	Qualification for promotion playoffs (Note: Only teams that meet J1 license criteria can participate in promotion playoffs. If one or more teams fail to meet the criteria, only eligible teams that finished 3rd to 6th will participate and no replacement teams will be added.)
4	Cerezo Osaka	42	18	13	11	57	40	+17	67	Qualification for promotion playoffs
5	Ehime FC	42	19	8	15	47	39	+8	65	Qualification for promotion playoffs
6	V-Varen Nagasaki	42	15	15	12	42	33	+9	60	Qualification for promotion playoffs
7	Giravanz Kitakyushu	42	18	5	19	59	58	+1	59	
8	Tokyo Verdy	42	16	10	16	43	41	+2	58	
9	JEF United Chiba	42	15	12	15	50	45	+5	57	
10	Consadole Sapporo	42	14	15	13	47	43	+4	57	
11	Fagiano Okayama	42	12	18	12	40	35	+5	54	
12	Zweigen Kanazawa	42	12	18	12	46	43	+3	54	
13	Roasso Kumamoto	42	13	14	15	42	45	−3	53	
14	Tokushima Vortis	42	13	14	15	35	44	−9	53	
15	Yokohama FC	42	13	13	16	33	58	−25	52	
16	Kamatamare Sanuki	42	12	15	15	30	33	−3	51	
17	Kyoto Sanga	42	12	14	16	45	51	−6	50	
18	Thespakusatsu Gunma	42	13	9	20	34	56	−22	48	
19	Mito HollyHock	42	10	16	16	40	47	−7	46	
20	FC Gifu	42	12	7	23	37	71	−34	43	
21	Oita Trinita (R)	42	8	14	20	41	51	−10	38	Qualification for relegation playoffs (Note: The playoffs and direct exchange between J2 and J3 are subject to eligibility of J2-licensed teams in top 2 of 2015 J3 League.)
22	Tochigi SC (R)	42	7	14	21	39	64	−25	35	Relegation to 2016 J3 League

Source: Meiji Yasuda J2 League Standing
Rules for classification: 1) Points; 2) Goal difference; 3) Goals scored
(C) Champions; (O) Play-off winners; (P) Promoted; (R) Relegated

== Results ==
Home \ Away	ARD	AVI	CER	CON	EHI	FAG	GIF	GIR	HOL	JEF	JÚB	KAM	ROS	SAN	SPA	TOC	TRI	VVN	VER	VOR	YFC	ZWE
Omiya Ardija		2–0	1–2	1–1	1–0	3–0	5–0	2–0	2–1	2–1	1–1	2–0	2–0	2–1	1–1	1–0	3–2	2–1	0–2	1–2	3–0	1–0
Avispa Fukuoka	1–3		1–0	2–1	1–0	1–0	2–2	4–2	1–0	1–0	2–0	1–3	1–0	1–3	4–1	4–2	1–1	0–0	0–0	1–0	4–0	0–2
Cerezo Osaka	3–1	0–1		3–1	1–0	2–1	1–0	1–0	2–2	1–1	1–2	0–0	1–1	3–0	1–2	4–1	0–0	1–2	2–0	1–0	2–0	0–2
Consadole Sapporo	2–3	2–1	1–1		0–1	0–0	1–2	1–1	1–0	3–2	3–0	0–1	2–3	1–2	0–0	4–1	1–1	0–1	1–1	2–0	2–0	2–1
Ehime FC	3–1	2–1	2–1	0–0		1–1	3–0	2–3	0–2	1–0	0–2	1–0	0–1	3–2	3–0	0–0	2–0	0–0	2–1	3–0	3–0	1–1
Fagiano Okayama	0–0	1–0	1–1	0–1	1–2		3–0	0–1	3–0	1–0	1–2	1–2	3–0	2–0	3–0	0–0	1–0	1–1	0–1	0–3	0–0	0–0
FC Gifu	0–5	1–4	0–2	0–1	2–1	0–0		1–0	1–1	1–0	2–0	1–0	0–1	1–1	1–1	0–1	0–3	1–0	0–2	1–2	0–1	0–2
Giravanz Kitakyushu	1–2	0–1	0–3	1–1	3–2	2–3	2–1		2–2	3–1	2–3	2–0	2–0	1–2	0–1	2–2	2–1	2–1	0–1	2–0	3–1	1–1
Mito HollyHock	1–0	2–2	1–1	2–1	3–1	1–0	0–2	1–2		1–1	1–1	0–1	0–0	0–2	0–0	2–1	1–1	1–3	2–0	3–0	0–1	1–1
JEF United Chiba	2–0	2–2	4–4	1–1	1–0	1–0	3–1	1–3	2–0		0–2	0–2	2–3	1–1	1–2	2–0	2–2	1–1	1–0	1–0	3–0	1–1
Júbilo Iwata	2–2	0–1	0–1	3–0	0–0	1–1	2–3	3–1	2–1	1–0		1–1	1–1	3–3	1–2	3–0	2–1	4–2	2–0	3–1	0–0	2–1
Kamatamare Sanuki	1–1	0–1	1–3	0–0	0–0	0–1	3–0	1–0	0–0	0–1	1–0		0–2	1–1	0–1	0–0	2–0	0–0	1–0	0–1	1–1	2–2
Roasso Kumamoto	3–0	0–1	0–0	1–1	2–0	1–1	1–2	0–1	1–1	0–4	0–2	0–1		0–0	2–2	2–0	0–0	1–0	0–1	2–2	0–1	0–2
Kyoto Sanga	2–2	1–2	1–0	2–0	0–1	0–0	0–0	2–0	2–1	0–2	0–2	1–1	2–1		0–1	1–2	2–1	1–4	1–1	0–1	1–2	1–1
Thespakusatsu Gunma	0–2	0–4	2–0	0–2	0–1	1–1	0–1	1–2	0–1	2–0	2–3	1–0	1–1	1–1		1–0	1–1	0–1	1–3	2–1	0–1	1–0
Tochigi SC	0–2	0–0	0–3	1–2	0–1	2–2	0–1	2–4	2–2	1–1	0–2	1–0	2–2	0–1	5–1		1–1	0–1	0–1	2–1	2–1	1–1
Oita Trinita	0–3	1–2	1–3	2–0	0–1	0–1	6–2	2–1	1–1	0–1	1–2	0–0	0–1	2–2	2–0	0–1		2–1	0–1	1–1	1–1	0–1
V-Varen Nagasaki	0–1	0–0	2–0	0–0	3–1	2–2	2–1	2–0	0–0	0–1	0–1	0–0	1–2	1–0	1–0	1–0	0–1		1–1	1–1	2–0	1–1
Tokyo Verdy	0–1	1–1	1–1	0–2	0–1	1–1	4–3	2–0	2–0	0–0	0–3	2–0	0–2	1–0	2–0	3–2	1–2	0–1		0–0	0–1	1–1
Tokushima Vortis	0–0	0–3	1–1	1–2	0–0	1–2	1–0	0–1	1–0	2–1	2–2	2–2	2–1	1–0	0–1	1–1	1–0	0–0	1–0		0–0	0–0
Yokohama FC	0–3	2–2	0–0	0–0	2–1	0–0	3–2	1–0	0–2	0–1	2–3	1–2	0–3	0–0	1–0	1–1	1–0	2–2	1–6	1–1		2–1
Zweigen Kanazawa	1–2	0–1	3–0	1–1	3–1	1–1	1–1	0–4	1–0	0–0	0–3	1–0	1–1	1–3	2–1	2–2	1–1	1–0	3–0	0–1	1–2	

Updated to match(es) played on 23 November 2015. Source: J.League Data
Legend: Blue = home team win; Yellow = draw; Red = away team win.

== Play-offs ==
=== J1 Promotion Playoffs ===
2015 J.League Road To J1 Play-Offs (2015 J1昇格プレーオフ)

Semifinals
3	Avispa Fukuoka	1
6	V-Varen Nagasaki	0
4	Cerezo Osaka	0
5	Ehime FC	0

Final
3	Avispa Fukuoka	1
4	Cerezo Osaka	1

=== Semifinals ===
29 November 2015
15:30

Avispa Fukuoka	1–0	V-Varen Nagasaki
Wellington 48'	Report

Level-5 stadium, Fukuoka
Attendance: 17,129

29 November 2015
15:30

Cerezo Osaka	0–0	Ehime FC
	Report

Yanmar Stadium Nagai, Higashisumiyoshi-ku, Osaka
Attendance: 13,893

=== Final ===
6 December 2015
15:35

Avispa Fukuoka	1–1	Cerezo Osaka
Nakamura 87'	Report	Tamada 60'

Yanmar Stadium Nagai, Higashisumiyoshi-ku, Osaka
Attendance: 29,314

Avispa Fukuoka was promoted to J1 League.

=== J3 Relegation Playoffs ===
2015 J2/J3 Play-Offs (2015 J2・J3入れ替え戦)

Team 1	Agg.	Team 2	1st leg	2nd leg
Oita Trinita	1–3	FC Machida Zelvia	1–2	0–1

29 November 2015
12:30

Machida Zelvia	2–1	Oita Trinita
K. Suzuki 45+2', 72'	Report	Daniel 22'

Machida Municipal Athletic Stadium, Machida, Tokyo
Attendance: 8,629

6 December 2015
12:30

Oita Trinita	0–1	Machida Zelvia
	Report	K. Suzuki 58' (pen.)

Ōita Bank Dome, Ōita
Attendance: 14,217

Oita Trinita was relegated to J3 League.
Machida Zelvia was promoted to J2 League.

== Top scorers ==
Rank	Scorer	Club	Goals
1	(England) Jay Bothroyd	Júbilo Iwata	20
2	(Serbia) Dragan Mrdja	Omiya Ardija	19
3	(Japan) Rui Komatsu	Giravanz Kitakyushu	18
4	(Brazil) Adailton	Júbilo Iwata	17
5	(Japan) Masashi Oguro	Kyoto Sanga	15
6	(Slovenia) Nejc Pečnik	JEF United Chiba	14
7	(Japan) Ken Tokura	Consadole Sapporo	13
7	(Japan) Ataru Esaka	Thespa Kusatsu	13
7	(Japan) Shohei Kiyohara	Zweigen Kanazawa	13
7	(Japan) Kazuki Hara	Giravanz Kitakyushu	13
11	(Japan) Hiroaki Namba	FC Gifu	12
11	(Japan) Kazuki Saito	Roasso Kumamoto	12
13	(Japan) Akihiro Ienaga	Omiya Ardija	11
13	(Japan) Kazuhisa Kawahara	Ehime FC	11
15	(Japan) Keiya Nakami	Tochigi SC	10
15	(Japan) Shuto Minami	Tokyo Verdy	10
15	(Uruguay) Diego Forlán	Cerezo Osaka	10
15	(Japan) Keiji Tamada	Cerezo Osaka	10

Updated to games played on 23 November 2015
Source: Meiji Yasuda J2 League Stats & Data - Ranking:Goals

== Attendances ==
Pos	Team	Total	High	Low	Average	Change
1	Cerezo Osaka	256,880	17,212	8,047	12,232	−43.4%^{†}
2	Consadole Sapporo	251,161	20,234	6,981	11,960	+8.1%
3	JEF United Chiba	225,219	15,051	8,123	10,725	+14.9%
4	Júbilo Iwata	210,865	13,576	6,946	10,041	+14.4%
5	Omiya Ardija	199,280	14,410	5,428	9,490	−12.2%^{†}
6	Avispa Fukuoka	183,466	16,676	4,553	8,736	+72.6%
7	Fagiano Okayama	176,652	15,820	4,346	8,412	+0.1%
8	Oita Trinita	158,194	15,152	4,103	7,533	−10.6%
9	Kyoto Sanga	157,306	16,920	3,206	7,491	−0.4%
10	Roasso Kumamoto	147,785	13,132	3,956	7,037	+0.5%
11	FC Gifu	129,756	8,814	3,539	6,179	−18.5%
12	Tokyo Verdy	118,751	16,629	2,691	5,655	+4.1%
13	Tochigi SC	108,501	9,319	2,581	5,167	−2.4%
14	Yokohama FC	107,364	9,663	2,208	5,113	−0.6%
15	Tokushima Vortis	105,398	8,684	3,307	5,019	−43.5%^{†}
16	V-Varen Nagasaki	106,953	10,184	2,994	4,931	+1.9%
17	Zweigen Kanazawa	103,120	12,353	1,227	4,910	+42.7%^{‡}
18	Mito HollyHock	101,132	8,391	2,290	4,816	+1.7%
19	Thespakusatsu Gunma	86,077	11,303	1,618	4,099	+9.0%
20	Ehime FC	79,193	9,158	1,722	3,771	−1.3%
21	Kamatamare Sanuki	76,824	10,447	2,152	3,658	+10.3%
22	Giravanz Kitakyushu	73,243	8,501	1,939	3,488	−3.7%
	League total	3,162,194	20,234	1,227	6,845	+3.9%

Updated to games played on 23 November 2015
Source: J. League data
Notes:
^{†} Team played previous season in J1.
^{‡} Team played previous season in J3.
