= Oita Trinita =

Japanese football club

Ōita Trinita 大分トリニータ
- Full name: Oita Trinita
- Nicknames: Trinita (トリニータ, Torinīta); Azzurro (Sky Blue); Camenaccio (カメナチオ, Kamenachio)
- Founded: 1994; 32 years ago as Ōita Trinity
- Stadium: Crasus Dome Oita; Ōita
- Capacity: 40,000
- Chairman: Masakaze Ozawa
- Manager: Shuhei Yomoda
- League: J2 League
- 2025: J2 League, 16th of 20
- Website: oita-trinita.co.jp
Home colours	Away colours

Ōita Trinita (大分トリニータ, Ōita Torinīta) is a Japanese football club located in Ōita, Capital of Ōita Prefecture. They currently play in J2 League, Japanese second tier of professional football.

== Name origin ==
The club's name, Trinita, is the Italian translation of the word trinity (trinità), which was the club's original name before being changed in 1999, and Ōita, the club's home town. The combined word expresses the will of the local citizens, companies, and government to support the team. Another connection to the Italian culture can be found in the city nickname Azzurro ("light blue" in Italian).

== History ==
The club was formed as Ōita Trinity in 1994 and advanced through the Ōita Prefectural League and the Kyushu League before finishing as the runner-up of the 1996 National League, resulting in promotion to the JFL. In 1999, the club changed its name to Trinita due to copyright infringement concerns. The same year, the club joined J.League Division 2, the second-highest flight in Japanese football (renamed to its current name of J2 League in 2015) and placed third. The club also placed third in 2000, and despite being in contention for promotion until the final game of the season in 2001, finished sixth. The following year, the club won J.League Division 2 and finally earned promotion to the top-flight Division 1. In 2008, the club won the J.League Cup, the first major title won by a Kyūshū club since Yawata Steel SC shared the 1964 Emperor's Cup.

In the 2009 season, Ōita suffered their worst-ever results in their seven-year history in the topflight, including 14 straight losses in league matches, which is the current worst record in the J.League since the golden goal system was eliminated. Ōita even fired cup-winning manager Pericles Chamusca in mid-July. On October 25, the club's relegation was confirmed after being held to a 1–1 draw by ten-man Kyoto Sanga, although the club would have faced relegation anyway as they had outstanding loans from the JFL's emergency fund and league rules prohibit clubs with such loans from participating in the top tier.

During the 2012 J.League Division 2 season, Ōita finished in sixth place, qualifying for the promotion playoffs in the first year of its introduction in Japan's second flight as the club had also paid back all its emergency loans that October. Despite being the lowest seed, Ōita defeated Kyoto Sanga 4–0 in the semi-final and JEF United Chiba 1–0 in the final, earning promotion to 2013 J.League Division 1, returning to the top tier after a 5-year absence This time, however, their top tier stay lasted only one season. In 2015 they were further relegated to J3 League after losing in the promotion playoffs to Machida Zelvia on December 6, becoming the first major trophy winner to be relegated to the third tier. The club immediately gained promotion back to J2 League by winning the J3 League title in 2016. In 2018, after finishing as runner's up in the J2 League in 2018, Oita Trinita gained promotion back to J1. After finishing 18th in 2021, Trinita would be relegated back to J2 League, but in the background of that, the club made a Cinderella run to the Emperor's Cup Final. Just 1 week after the confirmation to be relegated, they defeated defending Emperor's Cup champion Kawasaki Frontale in stunning fashion in the semis; after the game was tied 1 all, Trinita won 4–5 on penalty kicks. They ended up losing to Urawa Red Diamonds in the final, giving the Reds their eighth Emperor's Cup title.

The club will play its second consecutive season at the J2 League in the 2023 season.

== Stadium ==
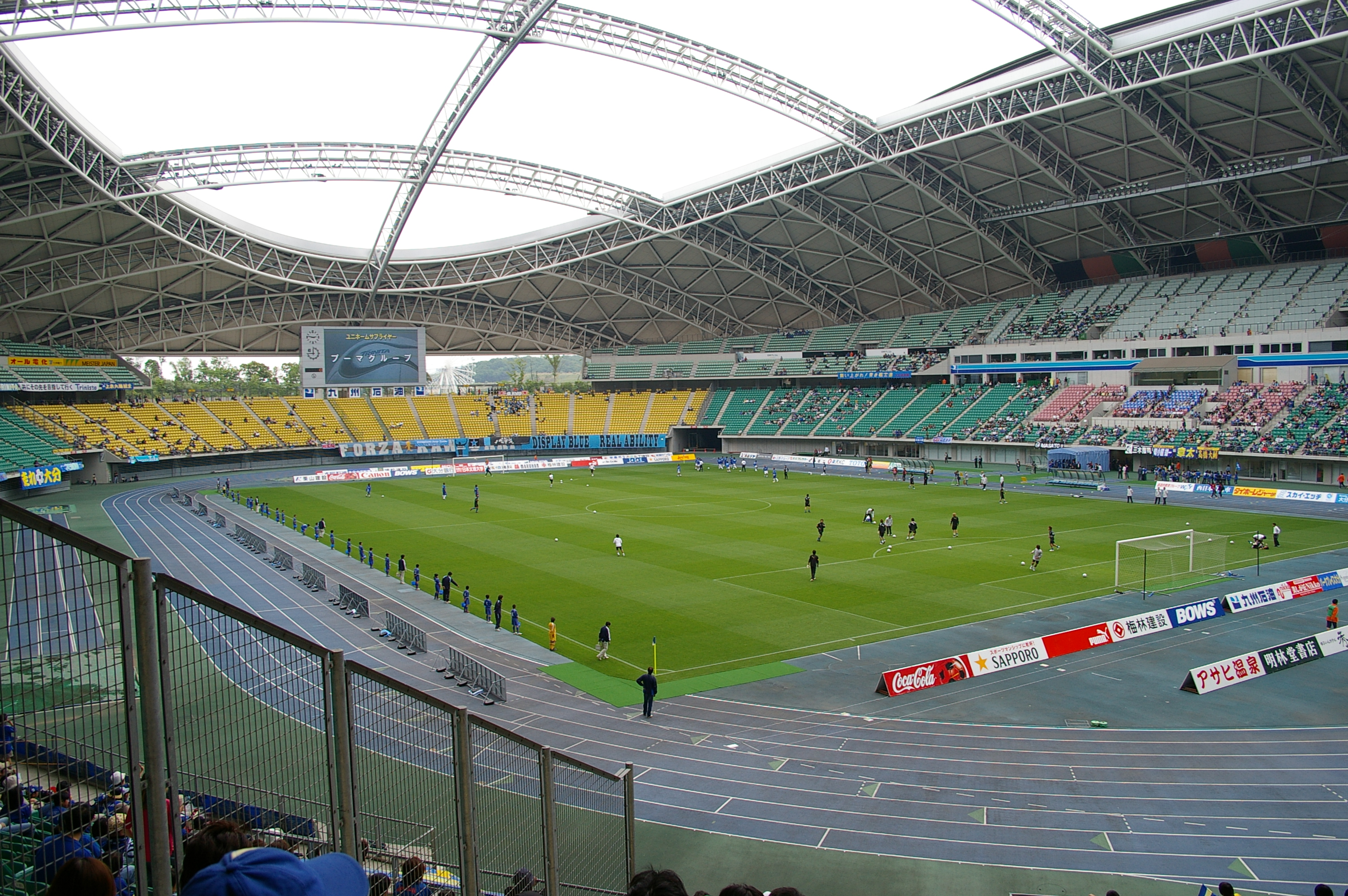
Ōita Stadium

The club's hometown is the city of Ōita, but the club draws support from the entire Ōita Prefecture. The stadium originally had a capacity of 43,000 for the 2002 FIFA World Cup, 3,000 movable seats on the track were removed, giving the stadium its current capacity of 40,000.

The club's home ground is Crasas Dome Oita, also known as the "Big Eye", which was one of the venues built for the 2002 FIFA World Cup. The club practices at its adjacent football and rugby field, and Ōita City Public Ground.

== League and cup record ==
Champions	Runners-up	Third place	Promoted	Relegated

Season	Div.	Teams	Pos.	P	W (OTW)	D	L (OTL)	F	A	GD	Pts	Attendance/G	J.League Cup	Emperor's Cup
1999	J2	10	3rd	36	18 (3)	3	8 (4)	62	42	20	63	3,886	2nd round	3rd round
2000	J2	11	3rd	40	26 (0)	3	8 (3)	80	38	42	81	4,818	1st round	3rd round
2001	J2	12	6th	44	24 (1)	4	9 (6)	75	52	23	78	6,638	2nd round	3rd round
2002	J2	12	1st	44	28	10	6	67	34	33	94	12,349	Not eligible	4th round
2003	J1	16	14th	30	5	11	14	27	37	-10	26	21,373	Group stage	3rd round
2004	J1	16	13th	30	8	6	16	35	56	-21	30	21,889	Group stage	5th round
2005	J1	18	11th	34	12	7	15	44	43	1	43	22,080	Group stage	5th round
2006	J1	18	8th	34	13	8	13	47	45	2	47	20,350	Group stage	5th round
2007	J1	18	14th	34	12	5	17	42	60	-18	41	19,759	Group stage	5th round
2008	J1	18	4th	34	16	8	10	33	24	9	56	20,322	Winners	4th round
2009	J1	18	17th	34	8	6	20	26	45	-19	30	18,428	Group stage	3rd round
2010	J2	19	15th	36	10	11	15	39	49	-10	41	10,463	Not eligible	3rd round
2011	J2	20	12th	38	12	14	12	42	45	-3	50	8,779	Not eligible	2nd round
2012	J2	22	6th	42	21	8	13	59	40	19	71	9,721	Not eligible	2nd round
2013	J1	18	18th	34	2	8	24	31	67	-36	14	11,915	Group stage	Quarter finals
2014	J2	22	7th	42	17	12	13	52	55	-3	63	8,422	Not eligible	3rd round
2015	J2	22	21st	42	8	14	20	41	51	-10	38	7,533	Not eligible	3rd round
2016	J3	16	1st	30	19	4	7	50	24	26	61	7,771	Not eligible	3rd round
2017	J2	22	9th	42	17	13	12	58	50	8	64	8,063	Not eligible	3rd round
2018	J2	22	2nd	42	23	7	12	76	51	25	76	8,907	Not eligible	2nd round
2019	J1	18	9th	34	12	11	11	35	35	0	47	15,347	Group stage	Quarter finals
2020 †	J1	18	11th	34	11	10	13	36	45	-9	43	5,147	Group stage	Did not qualify
2021 †	J1	20	18th	38	9	8	21	31	55	-24	35	6,722	Group stage	Runners-up
2022	J2	22	5th	42	17	15	10	62	52	10	66	6,618	Group stage	3rd round
2023	J2	22	9th	42	17	11	14	54	56	-2	62	9,143	Not eligible	2nd round
2024	J2	20	16th	38	10	13	15	33	47	-14	43	10,360	1st round	Round of 16
2025	J2	20	16th	38	8	14	16	27	44	-17	38	10,402	1st round	3rd round
2026	J2	40	27th	18	6	3	9	18	18	0	22	8,415	N/A	N/A
2026-27	J2	20	TBD	38									TBD	TBD

Key

- Pos. = Position in league; P = Games played; W = Games won; D = Games drawn; L = Games lost; F = Goals scored; A = Goals conceded; GD = Goals difference; Pts = Points gained
- OTW = Overtime wins - 1999, 2000, 2001 & 2002 Overtime wins only
- OTL = Overtime losses - 1999, 2000 & 2001 Overtime losses only
- 3 points for a win; 2 points for an overtime win (OTW), 1 point for a drawn game.
- Attendance/G = Average home league attendance
- † 2020 & 2021 seasons attendances reduced by COVID-19 worldwide pandemic
- Note: The 2011 season changed temporarily because of Tōhoku earthquake and tsunami, clubs in the affected area could not play, therefore the Division 2 North & Division 2 South merged into one group and the clubs only played once each. No promotion to Division 1 in that season.
- Source: J.League Data Site

== Honours ==
Honour	No.	Years
Kyushu Soccer League	1	1995
J2 League	1	2002
J.League Cup	1	2008
J3 League	1	2016

== Current squad ==
As of 22 September 2026.

Note: Flags indicate national team as defined under FIFA eligibility rules; some limited exceptions apply. Players may hold more than one non-FIFA nationality.

No.	Pos.	Nation	Player
1	GK	JPN	Yuya Tanaka
2	DF	JPN	Itsuki Oda
3	DF	JPN	Ayuki Miyakawa
5	MF	JPN	Hiroto Nakagawa
6	DF	JPN	Yuto Misao
7	MF	JPN	Yasufumi Nishimura
8	MF	JPN	Keigo Sakakibara
9	FW	JPN	Kotaro Arima
10	FW	BRA	Matheus Leiria
14	FW	JPN	Shinya Utsumoto
16	MF	JPN	Taira Shige
17	FW	JPN	Manato Kimoto
18	MF	BRA	Patrick Verhon (on loan from Kawasaki Frontale)
19	MF	JPN	Koya Hayashida
20	FW	JPN	Taiga Kimoto
21	FW	JPN	Shuto Udo
22	GK	KOR	Mun Kyung-gun

No.	Pos.	Nation	Player
24	MF	JPN	Keishin Yoshikawa
25	MF	JPN	Taishin Yamazaki
27	DF	JPN	Yūsuke Matsuo
28	MF	JPN	Hiroshi Kiyotake
29	FW	JPN	Yuto Sakurai
30	DF	JPN	Issei Tone
31	DF	BRA	Pereira
32	DF	JPN	Riku Sakata
33	DF	JPN	Seiya Inoue (on loan from Avispa Fukuoka)
34	FW	JPN	Daigo Furukawa
36	MF	JPN	Hayato Matsuoka
37	MF	JPN	Hibiki Goto ^{DSP}
40	GK	JPN	Hiroto Kono
44	DF	JPN	Kimiya Moriyama (on loan from Avispa Fukuoka)
45	FW	JPN	David Aizawa (on loan from Vissel Kobe)
50	GK	JPN	Koki Kawashima
72	MF	JPN	Takumi Yamaguchi

=== Out on loan ===
Note: Flags indicate national team as defined under FIFA eligibility rules; some limited exceptions apply. Players may hold more than one non-FIFA nationality.

No.	Pos.	Nation	Player
15	FW	JPN	Yūsei Yashiki (at FC Gifu)
23	DF	JPN	Shunsuke Ono (at (Singapore) FC Jurong)

No.	Pos.	Nation	Player
35	MF	JPN	Josei Sato (at Kochi United SC)
—	DF	JPN	Atsuki Satsukawa (at Kagoshima United)

== Club officials ==
For 2025 season

Position	Staff
Manager	(Japan) Shuhei Yomoda
First-team coaches	(Japan) Satoshi Yasui (Japan) Kenji Baba
Goalkeeper coach	(Japan) Keisuke Yoshisaka
Physical coach	(Japan) Ryo Yano
Strength coach	(Japan) Hitoshi Otomo
Cheef Trainer	(Japan) Shota Harada
Trainer	(Japan) Kiyohisa Shibata (Japan) Tsutomu Okabayashi (Japan) Tomoki Iwasa
Competent	(Japan) Hikaru Kikuzumi
Deputy officer	(Japan) Keishiro Seto (Japan) Akito Shimoyama
Interpreter	(Argentina) Alejandro Masafumi Matsumura

== Managerial history ==
Manager	Nationality	Tenure	
Manager	Nationality	Start	Finish
Moon Jung-sik	South Korea	1 February 1994	31 January 1997
Nobuhiro Ishizaki	Japan	1 February 1999	30 April 2001
Shinji Kobayashi	Japan	1 May 2001	31 January 2004
Han Berger	Netherlands	1 February 2004	31 January 2005
Hwangbo Kwan	South Korea	1 February 2005	28 August 2005
Arie Schans	Netherlands	1 September 2005	8 September 2005
Pericles Chamusca	Brazil	9 September 2005	13 July 2009
Ranko Popović	Serbia	1 August 2009	31 December 2009
Hwangbo Kwan	South Korea	1 February 2010	31 January 2011
Kazuaki Tasaka	Japan	1 February 2011	2 June 2015
Nobuaki Yanagida	Japan	1 June 2015	3 January 2016
Tomohiro Katanosaka	Japan	1 February 2016	31 January 2022
Takahiro Shimotaira	Japan	1 February 2022	10 November 2023
Tomohiro Katanosaka	Japan	30 November 2023	18 August 2025
Minoru Takenaka	Japan	18 August 2025	12 January 2026
Shuhei Yomoda	Japan	12 January 2026	Current

== Club captains ==
- (Japan) Cui Daewoo (1999)
- (Japan) Tomohiro Katanosaka (2000)
- (Japan) Tetsuro Uki (2002–2003)
- (Brazil) Sandro (2004)
- (Japan) Takayuki Yoshida (2005)
- (Japan) Takashi Miki (2006–2007)
- (Japan) Daiki Takamatsu (2008–2010)
- (Japan) Masashi Miyazawa (2011–2013)
- (Japan) Kazumichi Takagi (2014)
- (Brazil) Daniel (2015)
- (Japan) Satoru Yamagishi (2016–2017)
- (Japan) Akira Takeuchi (January – August 2018)
- (Japan) Kenji Baba (August – December 2018)
- (Japan) Yoshinori Suzuki (2019–2020)
- (Japan) Shun Takagi (2021)
- (Japan) Hokuto Shimoda (2022)
- (Japan) Tsukasa Umesaki (2023)
- (Japan) Arata Watanabe (2024)

== Kit evolution ==
Home kit - 1st
1999	2000 - 2001	2002 - 2003	2004	2005 - 2006
2007	2008	2009	2010 - 2011	2012 - 2013
2014	2015	2016	2017	2018
2019	2020	2021	2022	2023
2024	2025 -			

Away kit - 2nd
1999 - 2001	2002 - 2003	2004	2005	2006
2007	2008	2009	2010	2011
2012 - 2013	2014	2015	2016	2017 - 2018
2019	2020	2021	2022	2023
2024	2025 -			

Special kits - 3rd
2020; Limited	2021; Limited	2022; Limited
