= Football at the 1968 Summer Olympics – Men's team squads =

The following squads were named for the 1968 Summer Olympics tournament.

== Brazil ==
Head coach: Marão

No.	Pos.	Player	DoB	Age	Caps	Club	Tournament games	Tournament goals	Minutes played	Sub off	Sub on	Cards yellow/red
1	GK	Getúlio	Dec 13, 1947	20	?	(Brazil) Ferroviária	3	0	270	0	0	0
2	DF	Miguel Ferreira	Jan 20, 1949	19	?	(Brazil) Olaria	3	0	270	0	0	0
3	DF	João Almeida	Jul 3, 1947	22	?	(Brazil) Corinthians	3	0	225	1	0	(yellow card) 1
4	MD	Jorge	Feb 23, 1946	22	?	(Brazil) Palmeiras	1	0	90	0	0	0
5	FW	Tião	Sep 16, 1948	19	?	(Brazil) Corinthians	3	1	270	0	0	0
6	DF	Dutra	Jan 26, 1948	20	?	(Brazil) Bonsucesso	3	0	270	0	0	0
7	FW	Manoel Maria	Feb 29, 1948	20	?	(Brazil) Santos	1	0	44	0	0	(red card) 1
8	MD	China	Oct 3, 1948	19	?	(Brazil) Palmeiras	1	0	56	1	0	0
9	FW	Fernando Ferretti	Apr 26, 1949	19	?	(Brazil) Botafogo	3	2	229	1	0	(red card) 1
10	FW	Moreno	Feb 18, 1948	20	?	(Brazil) Palmeiras	2	0	180	0	0	0
11	FW	Toninho	Jun 26, 1947	21	?	(Brazil) São Paulo	3	0	270	0	0	0
12	GK	Raul Marcel	Feb 6, 1948	20	?	(Brazil) Palmeiras	0	0	0	0	0	0
13	DF	Cláudio Deodato	Aug 27, 1947	20	?	(Brazil) São Paulo	2	0	180	0	0	0
14	MD	Plínio	Feb 3, 1946	22	?	(Brazil) Corinthians	3	0	214	0	1	0
15	FW	Lauro	Sep 12, 1944	23	?	(Brazil) Palmeiras	0	0	0	0	0	0
16	MD	Luiz Henrique	May 10, 1947	21	?	(Brazil) Flamengo	2	0	180	0	0	0
17	FW	Arnaldo	Jan 15, 1947	21	?	(Brazil) Corinthians	2	0	51	0	2	0
18	FW	Chance	Mar 4, 1949	19	?	(Brazil) Juventus	1	0	90	0	0	0

== Bulgaria ==
Head coach: Georgi Berkov

No.	Pos.	Player	DoB	Age	Caps	Club	Tournament games	Tournament goals	Minutes played	Sub off	Sub on	Cards yellow/red
1	GK	Stoyan Yordanov	Jan 29, 1944	24	?	(Bulgaria) CSKA Sofia	5	0	480	0	0	0
2	DF	Atanas Gerov	Oct 8, 1945	22	?	(Bulgaria) Lokomotiv Sofia	5	0	450	0	0	0
3	DF	Georgi Hristakiev	May 28, 1944	24	?	(Bulgaria) Lokomotiv Sofia	6	1	570	0	0	0
4	DF	Milko Gaydarski	Mar 18, 1946	22	?	(Bulgaria) Levski Sofia	5	0	480	0	0	0
5	DF	Kiril Ivkov	Jun 21, 1946	22	?	(Bulgaria) Levski Sofia	5	1	433	0	0	(yellow card) 2 (red card) 1
6	MD	Ivaylo Georgiev	Oct 31, 1942	25	?	(Bulgaria) Lokomotiv Sofia	6	1	465	1	1	0
7	FW	Tsvetan Veselinov	Apr 27, 1947	21	?	(Bulgaria) Levski Sofia	3	2	150	1	1	(yellow card) 2 (red card) 1
8	MD	Evgeni Yanchovski	Sep 5, 1939	28	?	(Bulgaria) Beroe Stara Zagora	4	0	277	1	1	(yellow card) 1
9	FW	Petar Zhekov	Oct 10, 1944	23	?	(Bulgaria) Beroe Stara Zagora	6	4	438	1	2	(yellow card) 1
10	MD	Atanas Mihaylov	Jul 5, 1949	19	?	(Bulgaria) Lokomotiv Sofia	6	3	465	2	0	(red card) 1
11	FW	Georgi Vasilev	Jun 9, 1945^{1}	23	?	(Bulgaria) Lokomotiv Plovdiv	2	0	140	1	0	0
12	MD	Kiril Stankov	May 20, 1949	19	?	(Bulgaria) CSKA Sofia	3	0	216	0	1	0
13	MF	Asparukh Nikodimov	Aug 21, 1945	22	?	(Bulgaria) CSKA Sofia	6	2	497	1	1	0
14	FW	Mihail Gyonin	Nov 25, 1941	26	?	(Bulgaria) Levski Sofia	4	1	330	1	0	0
15	MD	Yancho Dimitrov	Mar 11, 1943	25	?	(Bulgaria) Beroe Stara Zagora	3	0	195	1	1	0
16	FW	Georgi Ivanov	May 10, 1947	21	?	(Bulgaria) Akademik Sofia	1	0	120	0	0	(yellow card) 1
17	DF	Ivan Zafirov	Dec 30, 1947	20	?	(Bulgaria) CSKA Sofia	4	1	252	0	2	0
19	GK	Todor Nikolov	Jun 1, 1945	23	?	(Bulgaria) Beroe Stara Zagora	1	0	90	0	0	0

^{1}Vasilev was born in 1944 but the birth date was changed in his passport so he could be eligible for the reinstated 1969 Balkan Youth Cup.

== Colombia ==
Head coach: Edgar Barona

No.	Pos.	Player	DoB	Age	Caps	Club	Tournament games	Tournament goals	Minutes played	Sub off	Sub on	Cards yellow/red
1	GK	Otoniel Quintana	Aug 23, 1946	22	?	(Colombia) Millonarios	3	0	270	0	0	0
2	DF	Gabriel Hernández Alonso	Jan 1942	26	?	(Colombia) Millonarios	3	0	270	0	0	(yellow card) 1
3	DF	Luis Soto	Apr 24, 1945	23	?	(Colombia) Deportes Tolima	3	0	270	0	0	0
4	DF	Oscar Muñoz	May 20, 1949	19	?	(Colombia) Deportivo Cali	2	0	180	0	0	0
5	DF	Decio López	1946		?	(Colombia) Deportivo Pereira	2	0	180	0	0	0
6	MF	Joaquín Pardo	Feb 28, 1946	22	?	(Colombia) Atlético Junior	3	0	208	0	1	0
7	DF	Pedro Ospina	1944		?	(Colombia) América de Cali	1	0	90	0	0	0
8	MF	Germán González Blanco	Jun 14, 1947	21	?	(Colombia) Deportivo Cali	2	0	152	1	0	0
9	MF	Alfredo Arango	Feb 16, 1945	23	?	(Colombia) Unión Magdalena	3	0	199	1	1	0
10	FW	Norman Ortíz	Jan 3, 1947	21	?	(Colombia) América de Cali	3	0	237	0	1	0
11	FW	Gustavo Santa	Oct 8, 1945	22	?	(Colombia) Atlético Nacional	2	1	180	0	0	0
12	MF	Ramiro Viáfara	Feb 13, 1947	21	?	(Colombia) Independiente Medellín	1	0	90	0	0	0
13	DF	Alberto Escobar	1947		?	(Colombia) Deportivo Pereira	1	0	90	0	0	0
14	DF	Gabriel Berdugo	Nov 26, 1947	20	?	(Colombia) América de Cali	3	0	270	0	0	0
15	FW	Javier Tamayo	Mar 16, 1950	18	?	(Colombia) Independiente Medellín	2	1	59	1	1	0
16	FW	Alfonso Jaramillo	Jul 20, 1947	21	?	(Colombia) Independiente Medellín	1	1	45	1	0	0
17	FW	Fabio Mosquera	Nov 28, 1947	20	?	(Colombia) Deportivo Cali	2	1	180	0	0	0
18	GK	Alberto Sánchez	Jan 2, 1944	24	?	(Colombia) Independiente Santa Fe	0	0	0	0	0	0
19	GK	Absalón Oviedo	Oct 25, 1944	23	?	(Colombia) Once Caldas	0	0	0	0	0	0

== Czechoslovakia ==
Head coach: Václav Blažejovský

No.	Pos.	Player	DoB	Age	Caps	Club	Tournament games	Tournament goals	Minutes played	Sub off	Sub on	Cards yellow/red
1	GK	Antonín Kramerius	Jul 10, 1939	29	?	(Czechoslovakia) Sparta Prague
2	DF	Jiří Večerek	Aug 4, 1943	25	?	(Czechoslovakia) Baník Ostrava
3	DF	Stanislav Jarábek	Dec 9, 1938	29	?	(Czechoslovakia) Spartak Trnava
4	DF	Peter Mutkovič	Oct 19, 1945	22	?	(Czechoslovakia) Slovan Bratislava
5	MF	Josef Bouška	Aug 25, 1945	23	?	(Czechoslovakia) Sparta Prague
6	DF	Josef Linhart	May 15, 1944	24	?	(Czechoslovakia) Slavia Prague
7	FW	Stanislav Štrunc	Oct 30, 1942	25	?	(Czechoslovakia) Dukla Prague
8	FW	Ladislav Petráš	Dec 1, 1946	21	?	(Czechoslovakia) Dukla Banská Bystrica
9	MF	Dušan Bartovič	Mar 4, 1944	24	?	(Czechoslovakia) Jednota Trenčín
10	FW	Pavel Stratil	Apr 17, 1945	23	?	(Czechoslovakia) TJ Sklo Union Teplice
11	FW	Jaroslav Boroš	Jan 1, 1947	21	?	(Czechoslovakia) VSS Košice
12	MF	Jaroslav Findejs	Sep 25, 1943	25	?	(Czechoslovakia) Bohemians Prague
13	FW	Ladislav Pajerchin	Nov 4, 1944	23	?	(Czechoslovakia) ZVL Považská Bystrica
14	FW	Miroslav Kráľ	Nov 2, 1947	20	?	(Czechoslovakia) Jednota Žilina
15	FW	Mikuláš Krnáč	Feb 15, 1947	21	?	(Czechoslovakia) Inter Bratislava
16	FW	Jozef Jarabinský	Mar 12, 1944	24	?	(Czechoslovakia) Dukla Prague
17	FW	Miloš Herbst	May 6, 1942	26	?	(Czechoslovakia) Škoda Plzeň
18	GK	Július Holeš	Mar 18, 1939	29	?	(Czechoslovakia) Lokomotiva Košice

== El Salvador ==
Head coach: Rigoberto Guzmán

No.	Pos.	Player	DoB	Age	Caps	Club	Tournament games	Tournament goals	Minutes played	Sub off	Sub on	Cards yellow/red
1	GK	Ricardo Martínez	Oct 28, 1947	20	?	(El Salvador) Águila	1	0	55	1	0	0
2	DF	Roberto Rivas	Jul 17, 1941	27	?	(El Salvador) Alianza	3	0	270	0	0	0
3	DF	Guillermo Castro	Jun 25, 1940	28	?	(El Salvador) Atlético Marte	2	0	180	0	0	0
4	DF	Edgar Morales	Apr 17, 1940	28	?	(El Salvador) Atlético Marte	1	0	90	0	0	0
5	DF	Jorge Vásquez	Apr 23, 1945	23	?	(El Salvador) Universidad	3	0	270	0	0	0
6	DF	José Ruano	Sep 30, 1945	22	?	(El Salvador) FAS	2	0	155	1	0	0
7	FW	Salvador Cabezas	Feb 28, 1947	21	?	(El Salvador) Adler	2	0	162	1	0	0
8	DF	Alberto Villalta	Nov 19, 1947	20	?	(El Salvador) Atlético Marte	2	0	157	0	0	(red card) 1
9	MD	José Quintanilla	Oct 29, 1947	20	?	(El Salvador) Atlético Marte	3	0	270	0	0	0
10	FW	Mauricio Rodríguez	Dec 12, 1945	22	?	(El Salvador) Universidad	3	1	255	1	0	0
11	FW	Elmer Acevedo	Feb 24, 1946	22	?	(El Salvador) FAS	1	0	90	0	0	0
12	MD	Mario Flores	Sep 12, 1943	24	?	(El Salvador) FAS	1	0	32	1	0	(yellow card) 1
13	FW	Mauricio González	Sep 19, 1945	22	?	(El Salvador) Atlético Marte	3	0	270	0	0	0
14	MF	Juan Ramón Martínez	Apr 20, 1948	20	?	(El Salvador) Águila	3	1	151	1	2	(yellow card) 1
15	FW	Víctor Azúcar	Sep 20, 1946	22	?	(El Salvador) Adler	2	0	30	0	2	0
16	MD	Sergio Méndez	Feb 14, 1942	26	?	(El Salvador) Atlético Marte	3	0	270	0	0	0
17	MD	José Manuel Angel	Aug 24, 1948	20	?	(El Salvador) Alianza	1	0	25	0	1	0
18	GK	Joaquin Alabi	Nov 11, 1943	24	?	(El Salvador) FAS	0	0	0	0	0	0
19	GK	Gualberto Fernández	Jul 12, 1941	27	?	(El Salvador) Atlante	3	0	215	0	1	0

== France ==
Head coach: André Grillon

No.	Pos.	Player	DoB	Age	Caps	Club	Tournament games	Tournament goals	Minutes played	Sub off	Sub on	Cards yellow/red
1	GK	Guy Delhumeau	Jan 14, 1947	21	?	(France) Stade Poitevin
2	DF	Dario Grava	Feb 11, 1948	20	?	(France) RC Strasbourg
3	DF	Bernard Goueffic	Jan 29, 1947	21	?	(France) Stade Rennais
4	DF	Jean Lempereur	Dec 28, 1938	29	?	(France) AS Aulnoye-Aymeries
5	MF	Freddy Zix	Jan 1, 1935	33	?	(France) ASPV Strasbourg
6	DF	Michel Verhoeve	Jan 29, 1939	29	?	(France) AC Cambrai
7	DF	Gilbert Planté	Mar 15, 1941	27	?	(France) Gazélec Ajaccio
8	MF	Michel Delafosse	Nov 25, 1943	24	?	(France) US Quevilly
9	MF	Jean-Michel Larqué	Sep 8, 1947	20	?	(France) AS Saint-Étienne
10	MF	Alain Laurier	Sep 12, 1944	24	?	(France) Stade de Reims
11	DF	Jean-Louis Hodoul	Apr 1, 1946	22	?	(France) Olympique de Marseille
12	MF	Daniel Périgaud	Dec 19, 1943	24	?	(France) ÉDS Montluçon
13	FW	Yves Triantafyllos	Oct 27, 1948	19	?	(France) AS Saint-Étienne
14	MF	Daniel Horlaville	Sep 22, 1945	22	?	(France) US Quevilly
15	FW	Marc-Kanyan Case	Sep 14, 1942	25	?	(France) Gazélec Ajaccio
16	FW	Charles Teamboueon	Dec 6, 1939	28	?	(France) Gazélec Ajaccio
17	FW	Michel Parmentier	Apr 1, 1948	20	?	(France) US Quevilly
18	MF	Gérard Hallet	Mar 4, 1946	22	?	(France) ÉDS Montluçon
19	GK	Henri Ribul	Mar 1, 1941	27	?	(France) ES Castres

== Ghana ==
Head coach: (West Germany) Karl-Heinz Marotzke

No.	Pos.	Player	DoB	Age	Caps	Club	Tournament games	Tournament goals	Minutes played	Sub off	Sub on	Cards yellow/red
1	GK	Robert Mensah	Jun 12, 1939	29	?	(Ghana) Cape Coast Dwarfs	0	0	0	0	0	0
2	DF	Akuamoah Boateng	May 23, 1938	30	?		0	0	0	0	0	0
3	DF	Bernard Kusi	Jun 1, 1939	29	?	(Ghana) Asante Kotoko	1	0	45	0	1	0
4	DF	John Eshun	Jul 17, 1942	26	?	(Ghana) Eleven Wise	3	0	270	0	0	0
5	DF	Charles Addo Odametey	Feb 23, 1937	31	?	(Ghana) Hearts of Oak	1	0	90	0	0	0
6	MD	Ibrahim Sunday	Jul 22, 1944	24	?	(Ghana) Asante Kotoko	3	1	225	1	0	0
7	FW	Osei Kofi	Jun 3, 1942	26	?	(Ghana) Asante Kotoko	2	1	180	0	0	0
8	MD	Cecil Jones Attuquayefio	Oct 18, 1942	25	?	(Ghana) Great Olympics	1	0	60	0	0	(red card) 1
9	FW	George Alhassan	Sep 9, 1941	27	?	(Ghana) Hearts of Oak	1	0	89	0	0	(yellow card) 1 (red card) 1
10	MD	Amosa Gbadamosi	Apr 15, 1942	26	?	(Ghana) Hearts of Oak	3	0	270	0	0	0
11	FW	Sammy Sampene	Dec 18, 1942	25	?	(Ghana) Asante Kotoko	2	1	135	1	0	0
12	FW	Abukari Gariba	Jun 13, 1939	29	?	(Ghana) Asante Kotoko	1	0	45	0	1	0
13	GK	Jon Bortey Noawy	Jun 13, 1939	29	?	(Ghana) Great Olympics	3	0	270	0	0	(yellow card) 1
14	MD	Joseph Wilson	Dec 2, 1939	28	?	(Ghana) Asante Kotoko	2	0	180	0	0	0
15	FW	Malik Jabir	Dec 8, 1944	23	?	(Ghana) Asante Kotoko	3	2	270	0	0	0
16	DF	Oliver Acquah	Mar 22, 1946	22	?	(Ghana) Asante Kotoko	3	0	270	0	0	0
17	MD	Jonathan Kpakpo	Dec 25, 1942	25	?		3	0	270	0	0	(yellow card) 1
18	FW	Robert Foley	Oct 16, 1943	24	?	(Ghana) Hearts of Oak	3	0	270	0	0	0
19	GK	John Botchway	May 10, 1945	23	?		0	0	0	0	0	0

== Guatemala ==
Head coach: (Argentina) César Viccino

No.	Pos.	Player	DoB	Age	Caps	Club	Tournament games	Tournament goals	Minutes played	Sub off	Sub on	Cards yellow/red
1	GK	Ignacio González	June 16, 1944	24	?	(Guatemala) Municipal	3	0	235	0	1	0
2	DF	Alberto López Oliva	Mar 10, 1944	24	?	(Guatemala) Municipal	4	2	339	1	0	0
3	DF	Lijon León	Apr 19, 1943	25	?	(Guatemala) Aurora	4	0	360	0	0	0
4	DF	Roberto Camposeco	Jul 6, 1941	27	?	(Guatemala) Aurora	2	0	180	0	0	0
5	DF	Horacio Hasse	Jul 13, 1945	23	?	(Guatemala) CSD Municipal	1	0	60	0	0	(red card) 1
6	DF	Luis Villavicencio	Feb 3, 1950	18	?	(Guatemala) Comunicaciones	3	0	270	0	0	0
7	DF	Hugo Montoya	Aug 7, 1941	27	?	(Guatemala) Municipal	4	0	360	0	0	0
8	FW	Armando Melgar Nelson	Nov 25, 1944	23	?	(Guatemala) Municipal	2	0	159	0	1	0
9	MD	Jorge Roldán	Jan 16, 1940	28	?	(Guatemala) Aurora	4	1	360	0	0	0
10	MD	Hugo Torres	Jul 9, 1945	23	?	(Guatemala) Comunicaciones	3	0	269	0	0	(red card) 1
11	FW	Jeron Slusher	Nov 7, 1944	23	?	(Guatemala) CSD Suchitepequez	3	0	225	0	1	0
12	MD	Antonio García	Jul 5, 1940	28	?	Antigua Guatemala	1	0	45	1	0	0
13	MD	Carlos Valdez	May 22, 1945	23	?	(Guatemala) CSD Municipal	0	4	284	0	0	0
14	FW	Armando Melgar Retolaza	Jul 22, 1945	23	?	(Guatemala) Comunicaciones	3	2	225	0	1	0
15	FW	Hugo Peña	May 6, 1936	32	?	(Guatemala) USAC	3	0	248	1	0	(red card) 1
16	FW	David Stokes	Jan 4, 1946	22	?	(Guatemala) Comunicaciones	2	1	135	1	0	0
17	MD	Ricardo Clark	Nov 24, 1937	30	?	(Guatemala) Municipal	1	0	39	0	1	0
18	FW	Edgar Chacón	Mar 30, 1945	23	?	(Guatemala) Municipal	1	0	51	1	0	0
19	GK	Julio Rodolfo García	Nov 23, 1945	22	?	(Guatemala) Comunicaciones	2	0	125	1	0	0

== Guinea ==
Head coach: Nabi Camara

No.	Pos.	Player	DoB	Age	Caps	Club	Tournament games	Tournament goals	Minutes played	Sub off	Sub on	Cards yellow/red
1	GK	Morlaye Camara	1933		?		2	0	93	0	1	0
2	DF	Pierre Bangoura	1938		?		3	0	270	0	0	0
3	DF	Ibrahima Fofana	1946		?	(Guinea) Conakry II	3	0	270	0	0	0
4	DF	Sékou Condé	1943		?		3	0	270	0	0	(yellow card) 1
5	DF	Amadou Sankon	1942		?		3	0	270	0	0	0
6	DF	Mamadouba Soumah	1943		?	(Guinea) Conakry II	2	0	135	1	0	0
7	MD	Maxime Camara	Feb 4, 1945	23	?	(Guinea) Conakry II	3	1	254	1	0	0
8	MD	Ibrahima Kandia Diallo	Nov 15, 1941	26	?	(Guinea) Conakry I	2	0	111	0	1	0
9	MD	Fodé Bouya Camara	1946		?		3	2	175	1	1	0
10	MD	Chérif Souleymane	Oct 20, 1944	24	?	(Guinea) Conakry II	3	0	270	0	0	0
11	FW	Mamadouba Yamador Camara	1945		?		3	1	270	0	0	0
12	MD	Samuel Smith			?	(Guinea) Conakry II	0	0	0	0	0	0
13	MD	Jacob Bangoura			?	(Guinea) Conakry II	0	0	0	0	0	0
14	FW	Petit Sory	Nov 30, 1944	23	?	(Guinea) Conakry II	3	0	252	0	0	(red card) 1
15	FW	Souleymane Sylla			?		0	0	0	0	0	0
16	FW	Ali Badara Dia	1941		?		1	0	45	0	1	0
17	FW	Morciré Sylla	Mar 3, 1948	19	?	(Guinea) Conakry II	0	0	0	0	0	0
18	MD	Soriba Soumah	1940		?	(Guinea) Conakry II	1	0	90	0	0	0
19	GK	Mamadi Sano	1944		?		2	0	177	1	0	0

== Hungary ==
Head coach: Károly Lakat

No.	Pos.	Player	DoB	Age	Caps	Club	Tournament games	Tournament goals	Minutes played	Sub off	Sub on	Cards yellow/red
1	GK	Károly Fatér	Apr 9, 1940	28	?	(Hungary) Csepel	6	0	523	1	0	0
2	DF	Dezső Novák	Feb 3, 1939	29	?	(Hungary) Ferencváros	5	2	450	0	0	0
3	DF	Lajos Dunai	Nov 29, 1942	25	?	(Hungary) MTK	4	2	360	0	0	0
4	DF	Miklós Páncsics	Feb 4, 1944	24	?	(Hungary) Ferencváros	5	0	450	0	0	0
5	DF	Iván Menczel	Dec 14, 1941	26	?	(Hungary) Vasas	6	3	444	1	1	(yellow card) 1
6	MD	Lajos Szűcs	Dec 10, 1943	24	?	(Hungary) Ferencváros	6	4	540	0	0	0
7	FW	László Fazekas	Oct 15, 1947	20	?	(Hungary) Újpest FC	6	1	483	2	0	0
8	FW	Zoltán Varga	1945	23	?	(Hungary) Ferencváros	0	0	0	0	0	0
9	MD	Lajos Kocsis	Jun 17, 1947	21	?	(Hungary) Budapest Honvéd	4	0	167	1	3	0
10	MD	Antal Dunai	Mar 21, 1943	25	?	(Hungary) Újpesti Dózsa	6	4	540	0	0	0
11	FW	László Nagy	Oct 21, 1949	18	?	(Hungary) Újpesti Dózsa	4	0	360	0	0	0
12	DF	László Keglovich	Feb 4, 1940	28	?	(Hungary) Győri Vasas ETO	1	0	90	0	0	0
13	GK	Bertalan Bicksei	Sep 17, 1944	24	?	(Hungary) Budapest Honvéd	0	0	0	0	0	0
14	FW	Ernő Noskó	May 26, 1945	23	?	(Hungary) Újpesti Dózsa	6	0	540	0	0	(yellow card) 1
15	MD	István Juhász	Jul 17, 1945	23	?	(Hungary) Ferencváros	6	1	495	1	0	(yellow card) 1 (red card) 1
16	MD	Miklós Szalai	Dec 6, 1946	21	?	(Hungary) Salgótarján	2	0	63	0	2	0
17	FW	István Sárközi	Oct 21, 1947	21	?	(Hungary) MTK	2	1	125	2	0	0
18	FW	István Básti	Sep 19, 1944	23	?	(Hungary) Salgótarján	3	0	172	1	1	0
19	GK	Zoltán Szarka	Aug 12, 1942	25	?	(Hungary) Szombathelyi Haladás	1	0	13	0	1	0

== Israel ==
Head coach: Emmanuel Scheffer

No.	Pos.	Player	DoB	Age	Caps	Club	Tournament games	Tournament goals	Minutes played	Sub off	Sub on	Cards yellow/red
1	GK	Haim Levin	Mar 3, 1937	31	?	(Israel) Maccabi Tel Aviv	3	0	300	0	0	0
2	DF	Shraga Bar	Mar 24, 1948	20	?	(Israel) Maccabi Netanya	4	1	293	0	1	(yellow card) 1
3	DF	Menachem Bello	Dec 26, 1947	20	?	(Israel) Maccabi Tel Aviv	4	0	390	0	0	0
4	DF	Zvi Rosen	Jun 23, 1947	21	?	(Israel) Maccabi Tel Aviv	4	0	390	0	0	(yellow card) 3
5	DF	Yisha'ayahu Schwager	Feb 10, 1946	22	?	(Israel) Maccabi Haifa	3	0	196	2	0	0
6	MF	Shmuel Rosenthal	Apr 22, 1947	21	?	(Israel) Hapoel Petah Tikva	3	0	300	0	0	(yellow card) 1
7	FW	Rachamim Talbi	May 17, 1943	25	?	(Israel) Maccabi Tel Aviv	3	1	238	0	0	(yellow card) 1 (red card) 1
8	MF	Giora Spiegel	Jul 27, 1947	21	?	(Israel) Maccabi Tel Aviv	4	2	390	0	0	0
9	FW	Yehoshua Feigenbaum	Dec 5, 1947	20	?	(Israel) Hapoel Tel Aviv	4	4	390	0	0	0
10	FW	Mordechai Spiegler	Aug 19, 1944	23	?	(Israel) Maccabi Netanya	4	1	390	0	0	0
11	MF	Roby Young	May 15, 1942	26	?	(Israel) Hapoel Haifa	2	0	120	1	1	0
12	FW	Itzhak Drucker	Jul 3, 1947	21	?	(Israel) Hapoel Petah Tikva	3	0	211	0	0	(red card) 1
13	MF	George Borba	Jul 12, 1944	23	?	(Israel) Hapoel Tel Aviv	3	0	225	1	0	0
14	DF	Yitzhak Englander	Apr 30, 1946	22	?	(Israel) Hapoel Haifa	1	0	45	0	1	0
15	MF	Itzhak Shum	Sep 1, 1948	19	?	(Israel) Hapoel Kfar Saba	0	0	0	0	0	0
16	DF	David Karako	Feb 11, 1945	23	?	(Israel) Maccabi Tel Aviv	1	0	70	1	0	0
17	FW	Nachman Castro	Jan 23, 1948	20	?	(Israel) Hapoel Tel Aviv	1	0	20	0	1	0
18	GK	Zion Digmi	May 8, 1942	26	?	(Israel) Hapoel Ramat Gan	0	0	0	0	0	0
19	GK	Shmuel Malika-Aharon	Jan 1, 1947	21	?	(Israel) Bnei Yehuda	1	0	90	0	0	0

== Japan ==
Head coach: (Japan) Ken Naganuma

#	Pos.	Player	Date of Birth	Age	Caps	Club	Tournament games	Tournament goals	Minutes played	Sub off	Sub on	Cards yellow/red
1	GK	Kenzo Yokoyama	Jan 21, 1943	25	?	(Japan) Mitsubishi Heavy Industries
2	DF	Hiroshi Katayama	May 28, 1940	28	?	(Japan) Mitsubishi Heavy Industries
3	DF	Masakatsu Miyamoto	Jul 4, 1938	30	?	(Japan) Furukawa Electric
4	DF	Yoshitada Yamaguchi	Sep 28, 1944	24	?	(Japan) Hitachi
5	DF	Mitsuo Kamata	Dec 16, 1937	30	?	(Japan) Furukawa Electric
6	DF	Ryozo Suzuki	Sep 20, 1939	29	?	(Japan) Hitachi
7	DF	Kiyoshi Tomizawa	Dec 3, 1943	24	?	(Japan) Yahata Steel
8	MF	Takaji Mori	Nov 24, 1943	24	?	(Japan) Mitsubishi Heavy Industries
9	MF	Aritatsu Ogi	Dec 10, 1942	25	?	(Japan) Toyo Industries
10	MF	Eizo Yuguchi	Jul 4, 1945	23	?	(Japan) Yanmar Diesel
11	MF	Shigeo Yaegashi	Mar 24, 1933	35	?	(Japan) Furukawa Electric
12	MF	Teruki Miyamoto	Dec 26, 1940	27	?	(Japan) Yahata Steel
13	MF	Masashi Watanabe	Jan 11, 1936	32	?	(Japan) Yahata Steel
14	FW	Yasuyuki Kuwahara	Dec 22, 1942	25	?	(Japan) Toyo Industries
15	FW	Kunishige Kamamoto	Apr 15, 1944	24	?	(Japan) Yanmar Diesel
16	FW	Ikuo Matsumoto	Nov 3, 1941	26	?	(Japan) Toyo Industries
17	FW	Ryuichi Sugiyama	Jul 4, 1941	27	?	(Japan) Mitsubishi Heavy Industries
18	GK	Masahiro Hamazaki	Mar 14, 1940	28	?	(Japan) Yahata Steel

== Mexico ==
Head coach: Ignacio Trelles

No.	Pos.	Player	DoB	Age	Caps	Club	Tournament games	Tournament goals	Minutes played	Sub off	Sub on	Cards yellow/red
1	GK	Javier Vargas	Nov 22, 1942	25	?	(Mexico) Atlas
2	DF	Juan Manuel Alejandrez	May 17, 1944	24	?	(Mexico) Cruz Azul
3	DF	Humberto Medina	Sep 5, 1942	26	?	(Mexico) Atlas
4	DF	Héctor Sanabria	Aug 17, 1945	22	?	(Mexico) PUMAS
5	DF	Mario Pérez	Dec 30, 1946	21	?	(Mexico) Club Necaxa
6	MF	Luis Regueiro	Dec 22, 1943	24	?	(Mexico) Necaxa
7	MF	Héctor Pulido	Dec 20, 1942	25	?	(Mexico) Cruz Azul
8	FW	Fernando Bustos	Aug 1, 1944	23	?	(Mexico) Cruz Azul
9	FW	Luis Estrada	Jul 7, 1948	20	?	(Mexico) Club León
10	FW	Vicente Pereda	Jul 18, 1941	27	?	(Mexico) Deportivo Toluca
11	MF	Cesáreo Victorino	Feb 8, 1947	21	?	(Mexico) Cruz Azul
12	GK	Jesús Mendoza	Nov 12, 1942	25	?	(Mexico) Nuevo León
13	DF	Jorge Arévalo	Sep 5, 1942	25	?	(Mexico) Deportivo Toluca
14	DF	Javier Sánchez	Nov 26, 1947	20	?	(Mexico) Cruz Azul
15	MF	Elías Muñoz	Nov 3, 1942	25	?	(Mexico) PUMAS
16	MF	Juan Ignacio Basaguren	Jul 21, 1944	24	?	(Mexico) Atlante F.C.
17	FW	José Álvarez	May 10, 1945		23	(Mexico) Nuevo León
18	FW	Albino Morales	May 30, 1942	26	?	(Mexico) Deportivo Toluca
19	FW	Bernardo Hernández	Aug 20, 1942	26	?	(Mexico) Atlante F.C.

== Nigeria ==
Head coach: (Hungary) József Ember

No.	Pos.	Player	DoB	Age	Caps	Club	Tournament games	Tournament goals	Minutes played	Sub off	Sub on	Cards yellow/red
1	GK	Peter Fregene	May 17, 1947	21	?	(Nigeria) Stationery Stores F.C.
2	DF	Anthony Igwe	December 24, 1945	22	?	(Nigeria) Stationery Stores F.C.
3	DF	Augustine Ofuokwu	August 14, 1944	24	?	(Nigeria) Stationery Stores F.C.
4	DF	Samuel Okoye	December 22, 1947	20	?	(Nigeria) DIC Bees
5	DF	Segun Olumodeji	April 1, 1945	23	?	(Nigeria) Stationery Stores F.C.
6	DF	Samuel Opone	June 13, 1942	26	?	(Nigeria) Stationery Stores F.C.
7	DF	Muwiya Oshode	June 8, 1946	22	?	(Nigeria) Stationery Stores F.C.
8	MF	Paul Hamilton	August 31, 1941	27	?	(Nigeria) ECN F.C.
9	MF	Kenneth Olayombo	August 29, 1947	21	?	(Nigeria) ECN F.C.
10	MF	Peter Anieke	March 2, 1946	22	?	(Nigeria) Stationery Stores F.C.
11	MF	Mohammed Lawal	September 23, 1939	29	?	(Nigeria) Stationery Stores F.C.
12	DF	Durajaiyef Adigun	July 4, 1946	22	?	(Nigeria) Shooting Stars S.C.
13	MF	Willy Andrews	December 15, 1943	24	?	(Nigeria) Stationery Stores F.C.
14	FW	Sebastian Brodrick	July 9, 1938	30	?	(Nigeria) ECN F.C.
15	FW	Clement Obojememe	August 17, 1945	23	?	(Nigeria) West African Airways Corp.
16	FW	Abdul Ganiyu Salami	October 5, 1942	26	?	(Nigeria) Railways Lagos
17	FW	Fred Aryee	July 22, 1939	29	?	(Nigeria) Stationery Stores F.C.
18	FW	Joseph Aghoghovbia	April 15, 1941	27	?	(Nigeria) Shooting Stars S.C.
19	GK	Yakubu Ibrahim	February 2, 1946	22	?	(Nigeria) Railways Lagos

== Spain ==
Head coach: (Uruguay) José Santamaría

No.	Pos.	Player	DoB	Age	Caps	Club	Tournament games	Tournament goals	Minutes played	Sub off	Sub on	Cards yellow/red
1	GK	Andrés Mendieta	Feb 12, 1945	23	?	(Spain) Rayo Vallecano	1	0	90	0	0
2	GK	Pedro Valentín Mora	Dec 18, 1947	20	?	(Spain) CD Condal	3	0	270	0	0
3	DF	Gregorio Benito	Oct 21, 1946	21	?	(Spain) Rayo Vallecano	4	0	343	1	0	3Y
4	DF	Francisco Espíldora	Oct 22, 1948	19	?	(Spain) Real Madrid C.F.	4	0	360	0	0	1Y
5	DF	Chufi	Jan 19, 1944	24	?	(Spain) Rayo Vallecano	0	0	0	0	0
6	DF	Miguel Ángel Ochoa	Sep 29, 1944	23	?	(Spain) R.C.D. Espanyol	4	0	360	0	0
7	DF	Isidro Sala	Sep 29, 1940	27	?	(Spain) Girona FC	4	0	283	0	1
8	MF	Juan Manuel Asensi	Sep 23, 1949	18	?	(Spain) Elche CF	3	0	253	0	1
9	MF	Javier Ciáurriz	Mar 5, 1946	22	?	(Spain) AD Plus Ultra	1	0	90	0	0
10	FW	José María Igartua	Mar 6, 1950	18	?	(Spain) Athletic Bilbao	1	0	90	0	0
11	FW	Rafael Jaén	Jan 3, 1949	19	?	(Spain) Córdoba CF	3	0	229	1	0
12	DF	Ramón Alfonseda	Mar 4, 1948	20	?	(Spain) CD Condal	1	0	90	0	0
13	FW	Crispi	May 22, 1947	21	?	(Spain) Córdoba CF	4	0	170	0	3
14	FW	José Antonio Barrios	Mar 21, 1949	19	?	(Spain) CD Tenerife	1	0	90	0	0	1Y
15	MF	Juan	Sep 16, 1948	19	?	(Spain) Racing de Ferrol	3	1	246	0	1
16	MF	José Luis Garzón	Aug 4, 1946	21	?	(Spain) CE Sabadell FC	3	0	231	0	1
17	MF	Toni Grande	Sep 17, 1947	20	?	(Spain) Real Madrid C.F.	4	2	338	0	1
18	FW	Gerardo Ortega	Oct 13, 1947	20	?	(Spain) Real Madrid C.F.	3	0	153	2	0
19	MF	Fernando Ortuño	Oct 12, 1944	23	?	(Spain) CE Sabadell FC	3	1	270	0	0

== Thailand ==
Head coach: (West Germany) Günther Glomb

No.	Pos.	Player	DoB	Age	Caps	Club	Tournament games	Tournament goals	Minutes played	Sub off	Sub on	Cards yellow/red
1	GK	Chao Oniam	Aug 10, 1951	17	?	(Thailand) Port Authority	1	0	90	0	0	0
2	GK	Sarawut Pathipakornchai	Apr 10, 1950	18	?	(Thailand) Bangkok Bank	2	0	180	0	0	0
3	DF	Narong Sangkasuwan	Oct 19, 1943	25	?	(Thailand) Royal Thai Police	3	0	270	0	0	(yellow card) 1
4	DF	Yongyut Sankhagowit	Oct 04, 1941	27	?	(Thailand) Bangkok Bank	3	0	225	1	0	0
5	DF	Phaisan Bupasiri	May 2, 1944	24	?	(Thailand) Bangkok Bank	0	0	0	0	0	0
6	DF	Chirawat Pimpawatin	Nov 30, 1952	15	?	(Thailand) Bangkok Bank	3	0	270	0	0	0
7	MD	Samruay Chaiyong	Feb 12, 1933	35	?	(Thailand) Bangkok Bank	1	0	26	0	1	0
8	DF	Phaibun Anyapo	Jul 14, 1948	20	?	(Thailand) Bangkok Bank	3	0	270	0	0	0
9	MD	Chatchai Paholpat	Apr 30, 1947	21	?	(Thailand) Bangkok Bank	2	0	142	0	0	(red card) 1
10	FW	Kriengsak Vimolset	Aug 13, 1942	26	?	(Thailand) Raj Pracha	1	0	54	0	1	0
11	MD	Udomsilp Sornbutnark	Jun 01, 1948	20	?	(Thailand) Bangkok Bank	3	1	216	1	0	0
12	MD	Narong Thongplew	Sep 29, 1947	21	?	(Thailand) Port Authority	1	0	90	0	0	0
13	MD	Niwat Srisawat	Aug 19, 1949	19	?	(Thailand) Raj-Vithi	2	0	137	2	0	0
14	MD	Suphot Panich	Jul 20, 1936	32	?	(Thailand)	3	0	225	1	0	0
15	FW	Bunlert Nilpirom	Sep 10, 1947	21	?	(Thailand) Bangkok Bank	3	0	270	0	0	0
16	MD	Pradem Muangkasem	Jul 02, 1941	27	?	(Thailand) Bangkok Bank	1	0	45	0	1	0
17	FW	Vichai Saengthammakitkun	Aug 22, 1947	21	?	(Thailand) Bangkok Bank	1	0	65	0	2	0
18	FW	Kriengsak Nukulsompratana	Jun 15, 1946	22	?	(Thailand) Bangkok Bank	3	0	270	0	0	0
