= Football at the 1968 Summer Olympics – Group D =

Football at the Summer Olympics group

Group D of the 1968 Summer Olympics football tournament took place from 14 to 18 October 1968. The group consisted of Bulgaria, Czechoslovakia, Guatemala, Thailand. The top two teams, Bulgaria and Guatemala, advanced to the quarter-finals.

== Teams ==
Team	Region	Method of qualification	Date of qualification	Finals appearance	Last appearance	Previous best performance							
Team	Region	Method of qualification	Date of qualification	Finals appearance	Last appearance	Previous best performance	Thailand	Asia	Asia Group 2 winners	22 January 1968	2nd	1956	First round (1956)
Bulgaria	Europe	Europe Group 2 winners	24 April 1968	5th	1960	Bronze medal (1956)							
Czechoslovakia	Europe	Europe Group 1 winners	1 June 1968	2nd	1964	Silver medal (1964)							
Guatemala	North America	CONCACAF final round winner	2 June 1968	1st	—	—							

== Standings ==
Pos	Team	Pld	W	D	L	GF	GA	GD	Pts	Qualification
1	Bulgaria	3	2	1	0	11	3	+8	5	Advance to knockout stage
2	Guatemala	3	2	0	1	6	3	+3	4	Advance to knockout stage
3	Czechoslovakia	3	1	1	1	10	3	+7	3	
4	Thailand	3	0	0	3	1	19	−18	0	

Source: FIFA

In the quarter-finals:

- The winners of Group D, Bulgaria, advanced to play the runners-up of Group C, Israel.
- The runners-up of Group D, Guatemala, advanced to play the winners of Group D, Hungary.

== Matches ==
=== Guatemala vs Czechoslovakia ===
14 October 1968
12:00

Guatemala	1–0	Czechoslovakia
Stokes 28'	Report

Estadio Jalisco, Guadalajara
Referee: Romualdo Arppi Filho (Brazil)

19	Julio Rodolfo García
2	Alberto López
3	Lijon León
4	Roberto Camposeco
7	Hugo Montoya
8	Nelson Melgar
9	Jorge Roldán
10	Hugo Torres	(red card) 89'
13	Carlos Valdez
15	Hugo Peña	(red card) 82'
16	David Stokes	(substituted off) HT'
Substitutions:
1	Ignacio González
5	Horacio Hasse
12	Antonio García
14	Armando Melgar	(substituted on) HT'
17	Ricardo Clark
Manager:
(Argentina) César Viccino

1	Antonín Kramerius
2	Jiří Večerek
3	Stanislav Jarábek	(yellow card) (red card) 88'
4	Peter Mutkovič
5	Josef Bouška
6	Josef Linhart
7	Stanislav Štrunc
8	Ladislav Petráš
9	Dušan Bartovič		(substituted off) 72'
10	Pavel Stratil		(substituted off) 55'
14	Miroslav Kráľ
Substitutions:
18	Július Holeš
12	Jaroslav Findejs
13	Ladislav Pajerchin		(substituted on) 72'
15	Mikuláš Krnáč		(substituted on) 55'
17	Miloš Herbst
Manager:
(Czechoslovakia) Václav Blažejovský

Assistant referees:
Abel Aguilar Elizalde (Mexico)
Diego De Leo (Mexico)

=== Bulgaria vs Thailand ===
14 October 1968
12:00

Bulgaria	7–0	Thailand
Gyonin 25'; Zhekov 55'; Mihaylov 56', 61'; Zafirov 73'; Nikodimov 85'; Ivkov 88'	Report

Estadio Nou Camp, León
Referee: Guillermo Velásquez (Colombia)

1	Stoyan Yordanov
2	Atanas Gerov
3	Georgi Hristakiev
4	Milko Gaydarski
5	Kiril Ivkov
6	Ivaylo Georgiev
9	Petar Zhekov	(substituted off) 70'
10	Atanas Mihaylov	(substituted off) 77'
11	Georgi Vasilev
13	Asparuh Nikodimov
14	Mihail Gyonin
Substitutions:
19	Todor Krastev
7	Tsvetan Veselinov
8	Evgeni Yanchovski	(substituted on) 77'
16	Georgi Tsvetkov
17	Ivan Zafirov	(substituted on) 70'
Manager:
(Bulgaria) Georgi Berkov

2	Saravuth Parthipakoranchai
3	Narong Sangkasuwan
4	Yongyouth Sangkagowit
6	Chirawat Pimpawatin
8	Paiboon Unyapo
9	Chatchai Paholpat
11	Udomsilp Sornbutnark
13	Niwat Srisawat	(substituted off) 70'
14	Suphot Panich	(substituted off) HT'
15	Boonlert Nilpirom
18	Kriengsak Nukulsompratana
Substitutions:
1	Chow On-iam
7	Snong Chaiyong
10	Kriengsak Vimolsate
16	Praderm Muankasem	(substituted on) HT'
17	Vichai Sanghamkichakul	(substituted on) 70'
Manager:
(West Germany) Günther Glomb

Assistant referees:
Raul Osorio (Mexico)
Jean-Louis Faber (Guinea)

=== Bulgaria vs Czechoslovakia ===
16 October 1968
12:00

Bulgaria	2–2	Czechoslovakia
Georgiev 44'; Zhekov 77'	Report	Jarabinský 25'; Petráš 42'

Estadio Jalisco, Guadalajara
Referee: Abel Aguilar Elizalde (Mexico)

1	Stoyan Yordanov
2	Atanas Gerov
3	Georgi Hristakiev
5	Kiril Ivkov	Booked
6	Ivaylo Georgiev
9	Petar Zhekov
10	Atanas Mihaylov
12	Kiril Stankov
14	Mihail Gyonin
15	Yancho Dimitrov	(substituted off) HT'
17	Ivan Zafirov
Substitutions:
19	Todor Krastev
4	Milko Gaydarski
11	Georgi Vasilev
13	Asparuh Nikodimov	(substituted on) HT'
16	Georgi Tsvetkov
Manager:
(Bulgaria) Georgi Berkov

1	Antonín Kramerius		(substituted off) 72'
2	Jiří Večerek
4	Peter Mutkovič
5	Josef Bouška
6	Josef Linhart
8	Ladislav Petráš	Booked
11	Jaroslav Boroš
12	Jaroslav Findejs		(substituted off) 57'
13	Ladislav Pajerchin	Booked
14	Miroslav Kráľ
Substitutions:
18	Július Holeš		(substituted on) 72'
7	Stanislav Štrunc
9	Dušan Bartovič	Booked	(substituted on) 57'
10	Pavel Stratil
15	Mikuláš Krnáč
Manager:
(Czechoslovakia) Václav Blažejovský

Assistant referees:
Alfonso González (Mexico)
Felipe Buergo (Mexico)

=== Guatemala vs Thailand ===
16 October 1968
12:00

Guatemala	4–1	Thailand
N. Melgar 23', 85'; Roldán 55'; López Oliva 67'	Report	Udomsilp 44'

Estadio Nou Camp, León
Referee: Jean-Louis Faber (Guinea)

1	Ignacio González
2	Alberto López
3	Lijon León
5	Horacio Hasse	(red card) 60'
6	Luis Villavicencio
7	Hugo Montoya
9	Jorge Roldán
12	Antonio García		(substituted off) HT'
13	Carlos Valdez
14	Armando Melgar
18	Edgar Chacón		(substituted off) 51'
Substitutions:
19	Julio Rodolfo García
8	Nelson Melgar
11	Jeron Slusher		(substituted on) HT'
17	Ricardo Clark		(substituted on) 51'
Manager:
(Argentina) César Viccino

1	Chow On-iam
3	Narong Sangkasuwan	Booked
4	Yongyouth Sangkagowit		(substituted off) HT'
6	Chirawat Pimpawatin
8	Paiboon Unyapo
9	Chatchai Paholpat		(red card) 52'
11	Udomsilp Sornbutnark
13	Niwat Srisawat		(substituted off) 67'
14	Suphot Panich
15	Boonlert Nilpirom
18	Kriengsak Nukulsompratana
Substitutions:
2	Saravuth Parthipakoranchai
7	Snong Chaiyong		(substituted on) 67'
10	Kriengsak Vimolsate
12	Narong Thongpleow
17	Vichai Sanghamkichakul		(substituted on) HT'
Manager:
(West Germany) Günther Glomb

Assistant referees:
Guillermo Velásquez (Colombia)
Raul Osorio (Mexico)

=== Bulgaria vs Guatemala ===
18 October 1968
12:00

Bulgaria	2–1	Guatemala
Nikodimov 50'; Zhekov 84'	Report	López Oliva 88'

Estadio Nou Camp, León
Referee: Raúl Osorio (Mexico)

1	Stoyan Yordanov
2	Atanas Gerov
3	Georgi Hristakiev
4	Milko Gaydarski
5	Kiril Ivkov
6	Ivaylo Georgiev
10	Atanas Mihaylov
11	Georgi Vasilev	(substituted off) 50'
13	Asparuh Nikodimov
14	Mihail Gyonin
16	Georgi Tsvetkov	(substituted off) 52'
Substitutions:
19	Todor Krastev
7	Tsvetan Veselinov	(substituted on) 50'
9	Petar Zhekov	(substituted on) 52'
12	Kiril Stankov
17	Ivan Zafirov
Manager:
(Bulgaria) Georgi Berkov

19	Julio Rodolfo García	(substituted off) 35'
2	Alberto López
3	Lijon León
4	Roberto Camposeco
6	Luis Villavicencio
7	Hugo Montoya
9	Jorge Roldán
10	Hugo Torres
11	Jeron Slusher
13	Carlos Valdez
15	Hugo Peña
Substitutions:
1	Ignacio González	(substituted on) 35'
8	Nelson Melgar
12	Antonio García
17	Ricardo Clark
Manager:
(Argentina) César Viccino

Assistant referees:
Guillermo Velásquez (Colombia)
Raul Osorio (Mexico)

=== Czechoslovakia vs Thailand ===
18 October 1968
12:00

Czechoslovakia	8–0	Thailand
Herbst 12'; Petráš 17', 18', 67'; Stratil 28', 34'; Večerek 38'; Krnáč 83'	Report

Estadio Jalisco, Guadalajara
Referee: Felipe Buergo Elcuaz (Mexico)

1	Antonín Kramerius
2	Jiří Večerek
3	Stanislav Jarábek
4	Peter Mutkovič
5	Josef Bouška
6	Josef Linhart
8	Ladislav Petráš
10	Pavel Stratil		(substituted off) 63'
13	Ladislav Pajerchin
14	Miroslav Kráľ	Booked
17	Miloš Herbst		(substituted off) 42'
Substitutions:
18	Július Holeš
7	Stanislav Štrunc		(substituted on) 42'
9	Dušan Bartovič
11	Jaroslav Boroš
15	Mikuláš Krnáč		(substituted on) 63'
Manager:
(Czechoslovakia) Václav Blažejovský

2	Saravuth Parthipakoranchai
3	Narong Sangkasuwan
4	Yongyouth Sangkagowit
6	Chirawat Pimpawatin
8	Paiboon Unyapo
11	Udomsilp Sornbutnark	(substituted off) 36'
12	Narong Thongpleow
14	Suphot Panich
15	Boonlert Nilpirom
17	Vichai Sanghamkichakul
18	Kriengsak Nukulsompratana
Substitutions:
1	Chow On-iam
7	Snong Chaiyong
10	Kriengsak Vimolsate	(substituted on) 36'
Manager:
(West Germany) Günther Glomb

Assistant referees:
Guillermo Velásquez (Colombia)
Raul Osorio (Mexico)

== See also ==
- Bulgaria at the Olympics
- Guatemala at the Olympics
- Czechoslovakia at the Olympics
- Thailand at the Olympics
