= Football at the 1968 Summer Olympics – Knockout stage =

The knockout stage of the 1968 Summer Olympics football tournament was the second and final stage of the competition, following the group stage. Played from 20 to 26 October, the knockout stage ended with the final held at Estadio Azteca in Mexico City, Mexico. The top two teams from each group advanced to the knockout stage to compete in a single-elimination tournament. There were eleven matches in the knockout stage, including play-offs played between the losing teams of the quarter-finals and semi-finals for extra allocated finishing positions.

== Format ==
The knockout stage of the 1968 Summer Olympics football tournament was contested between eight teams that qualified from the group stage. Matches in the knockout stage were played to a finish. If the score of a match was level at the end of 90 minutes of playing time, extra time was played. If, after two periods of 15 minutes, the scores were still tied, the match was decided by lots.

== Qualified teams ==
The top two placed teams from each of the four groups qualified for the knockout stage.

Group	Winners	Runners-up
A	France	Mexico
B	Spain	Japan
C	Hungary	Israel
D	Bulgaria	Guatemala

== Bracket ==
The tournament bracket is shown below, with bold denoting the winners of each match.

Quarter-finals
20 October – Puebla
**Mexico**	**2**
Spain	0
20 October – Leon
**Bulgaria**	1
Israel	1
20 October – Guadalajara
**Hungary**	**1**
Guatemala	0
20 October – Mexico City
**Japan**	**3**
France	1

Semi-finals
22 October – Guadalajara
Mexico	2
**Bulgaria**	**3**
22 October – Mexico City
**Hungary**	**5**
Japan	0

Gold medal match
26 October – Mexico City
Bulgaria	1
**Hungary**	**4**
Bronze medal match
24 October – Mexico City
**Japan**	**2**
Mexico	0

== Quarter-finals ==
=== Japan vs France ===
20 October 1968
12:00

Japan	3–1	France
Kamamoto 27', 59'; Watanabe 70'	Report	Teamboueon 32'

Azteca Stadium, Mexico City
Referee: Seyoum Tarekegn (Ethiopia)

**1**	Kenzo Yokoyama
**2**	Hiroshi Katayama
**3**	Masakatsu Miyamoto
**4**	Yoshitada Yamaguchi
**5**	Mitsuo Kamata
**8**	Takaji Mori
**9**	Aritatsu Ogi
**12**	Teruki Miyamoto
**13**	Masashi Watanabe
**15**	Kunishige Kamamoto
**17**	Ryūichi Sugiyama	(substituted off) 70'
Substitutions:
**18**	Masahiro Hamazaki
**6**	Ryozo Suzuki
**7**	Kiyoshi Tomizawa
**11**	Shigeo Yaegashi
**16**	Ikuo Matsumoto	(substituted on) 70'
Manager:
(Japan) Shunichiro Okano

**19**	Henri Ribul
**4**	Jean Lempereur
**5**	Freddy Zix
**6**	Michel Verhoeve
**7**	Gilbert Planté	(substituted off) 59'
**9**	Jean-Michel Larqué
**11**	Jean-Louis Hodoul	Booked
**14**	Daniel Horlaville
**15**	Marc-Kanyan Case
**16**	Charles Teamboueon
**18**	Gérard Hallet
Substitutions:
**2**	Dario Grava
**3**	Bernard Goueffic	(substituted on) 59'
**8**	Michel Delafosse
**10**	Alain Laurier
**12**	Daniel Périgaud
Manager:
(France) André Grillon

Assistant referees:
Erwin Hieger (Austria)
Abraham Klein (Israel)

=== Mexico vs Spain ===
20 October 1968
12:00

Mexico	2–0	Spain
Morales 34'; Pereda 48'	Report

Estadio Cuauhtémoc, Puebla
Referee: Milivoje Gugulović (Yugoslavia)

**1**	Javier Vargas
**2**	Juan Manuel Alejándrez
**4**	Héctor Sanabria
**5**	Mario Pérez
**6**	Luis Regueiro
**7**	Héctor Pulido
**10**	Vicente Pereda
**11**	Cesáreo Victorino	(substituted off) 62'
**14**	Javier Sánchez
**15**	Elías Muñoz
**18**	Albino Morales
Substitutions:
**12**	Jesús Mendoza
**8**	Fernando Bustos	(substituted on) 62'
**13**	Jesús Mendoza Rivas
**16**	Juan Ignacio Basaguren
**17**	José Álvarez
Manager:
(Mexico) Ignacio Trelles

**2**	Pere Valentí Mora
**3**	Goyo Benito
**4**	Francisco Espíldora	Booked
**6**	Miguel Ángel Ochoa
**7**	Isidro Sala
**8**	Juan Manuel Asensi
**11**	Rafael Jaén		(substituted off) 49'
**15**	Juan Fernández
**16**	José Luis Garzón		(substituted off) 51'
**17**	Toni Grande
**19**	Fernando Ortuño
Substitutions:
**1**	Andrés Mendieta
**10**	José María Igartua
**13**	Crispi		(substituted on) 49'
**14**	José Antonio Barrios
**18**	Gerardo Ortega		(substituted on) 51'
Manager:
(Uruguay) José Santamaría

Assistant referees:
Dimitar Rumentchev (Bulgaria)
George Lamptey (Ghana)

=== Hungary vs Guatemala ===
20 October 1968
12:00

Hungary	1–0	Guatemala
Szűcs 69'	Report

Estadio Jalisco, Guadalajara
Referee: Arturo Yamasaki (Peru)

**1**	Károly Fatér
**2**	Dezső Novák
**3**	Lajos Dunai
**4**	Miklós Páncsics
**5**	Iván Menczel	Booked	(substituted off) 60'
**6**	Lajos Szűcs
**7**	László Fazekas
**10**	Antal Dunai
**14**	Ernő Noskó	Booked
**15**	István Juhász
**18**	István Básti		(substituted off) 72'
Substitutions:
**19**	Zoltán Szarka
**9**	Lajos Kocsis		(substituted on) 60'
**11**	László Nagy
**16**	Miklós Szalay		(substituted on) 72'
**17**	István Sárközi
Manager:
(Hungary) Károly Lakat

**1**	Ignacio González
**2**	Alberto López	(substituted off) 69'
**3**	Lijon León
**6**	Luis Villavicencio
**7**	Hugo Montoya
**9**	Jorge Roldán
**10**	Hugo Torres
**11**	Jeron Slusher
**14**	Armando Melgar
**15**	Hugo Peña	(substituted off) 76'
**16**	David Stokes
Substitutions:
**19**	Julio Rodolfo García
**8**	Nelson Melgar	(substituted on) 69'
**12**	Antonio García
**13**	Carlos Valdez	(substituted on) 76'
**17**	Ricardo Clark
Manager:
(Argentina) César Viccino

Assistant referees:
Romualdo Arppi Filho (Brazil)
Alfonso González (Mexico)

=== Bulgaria vs Israel ===
Bulgaria progressed after a drawing of lots.

20 October 1968
12:00

Bulgaria	1–1	Israel
Hristakiev 5'	Report	Feigenbaum 89'

Estadio Nou Camp, León
Referee: Michel Kitabdjian (France)

**1**	Stoyan Yordanov
**3**	Georgi Hristakiev
**4**	Milko Gaydarski
**5**	Kiril Ivkov	Booked
**8**	Evgeni Yanchovski
**10**	Atanas Mihaylov		(substituted off) 75'
**13**	Asparuh Nikodimov
**14**	Mihail Gyonin		(substituted off) 60'
**15**	Yancho Dimitrov	Booked
**16**	Georgi Tsvetkov	Booked
**17**	Ivan Zafirov
Substitutions:
**19**	Todor Krastev
**6**	Ivaylo Georgiev		(substituted on) 75'
**7**	Tsvetan Veselinov
**9**	Petar Zhekov		(substituted on) 60'
**12**	Kiril Stankov
Manager:
(Bulgaria) Georgi Berkov

**1**	Haim Levin
**2**	Shraga Bar	Booked
**3**	Menachem Bello
**4**	Zvi Rosen	Booked
**5**	Yisha'ayahu Schwager		(substituted off) 39'
**6**	Shmuel Rosenthal	Booked
**8**	Giora Spiegel
**9**	Yehoshua Feigenbaum
**10**	Mordechai Spiegler
**11**	Roby Young		(substituted off) 75'
**12**	Itzhak Drucker
Substitutions:
**19**	Shmuel Malika-Aharon
**13**	George Borba		(substituted on) 39'
**14**	Yitzhak Englander		(substituted on) 75'
**15**	Itzhak Shum
**17**	Nachman Castro

Assistant referees:
Guillermo Velásquez (Colombia)
Shakibudeen Thompson (Nigeria)

== Semi-finals ==
=== Hungary vs Japan ===
22 October 1968
12:00

Hungary	5–0	Japan
Szűcs 30', 60', 75'; Novák 53', 65'	Report

Azteca Stadium, Mexico City
Referee: Romualdo Arppi Filho (Brazil)

**1**	Károly Fatér	(substituted off) 77'
**2**	Dezső Novák
**3**	Lajos Dunai
**4**	Miklós Páncsics
**6**	Lajos Szűcs
**7**	László Fazekas
**9**	Lajos Kocsis	(substituted off) 56'
**10**	Antal Dunai
**11**	László Nagy
**14**	Ernő Noskó
**15**	István Juhász
Substitutions:
**19**	Zoltán Szarka	(substituted on) 77'
**5**	Iván Menczel	(substituted on) 56'
**12**	László Keglovich
**16**	Miklós Szalay
**17**	István Sárközi
Manager:
(Hungary) Károly Lakat

**1**	Kenzo Yokoyama
**2**	Hiroshi Katayama
**3**	Masakatsu Miyamoto	(substituted off) 67'
**4**	Yoshitada Yamaguchi
**5**	Mitsuo Kamata
**8**	Takaji Mori
**9**	Aritatsu Ogi
**12**	Teruki Miyamoto	(substituted off) 60'
**13**	Masashi Watanabe
**15**	Kunishige Kamamoto
**17**	Ryūichi Sugiyama
Substitutions:
**18**	Masahiro Hamazaki
**6**	Ryozo Suzuki
**7**	Kiyoshi Tomizawa	(substituted on) 67'
**11**	Shigeo Yaegashi	(substituted on) 60'
**16**	Ikuo Matsumoto
Manager:
(Japan) Shunichiro Okano

Assistant referees:
Guillermo Velásquez (Colombia)
Erwin Hieger (Austria)

=== Mexico vs Bulgaria ===
22 October 1968
12:00

Mexico	2–3	Bulgaria
Morales 39'; Pulido Rodríguez 48'	Report	Zhekov 8'; Mihaylov 9'; Veselinov 58'

Estadio Jalisco, Guadalajara
Referee: Seyoum Tarekegn (Ethiopia)

**1**	Javier Vargas
**2**	Juan Manuel Alejándrez
**4**	Héctor Sanabria	Booked
**5**	Mario Pérez
**6**	Luis Regueiro		(substituted off) 73'
**7**	Héctor Pulido
**10**	Vicente Pereda
**11**	Cesáreo Victorino
**14**	Javier Sánchez
**15**	Elías Muñoz		(substituted off) 65'
**18**	Albino Morales
Substitutions:
**12**	Jesús Mendoza
**8**	Fernando Bustos
**13**	Jesús Mendoza Rivas
**16**	Juan Ignacio Basaguren		(substituted on) 73'
**17**	José Álvarez		(substituted on) 65'
Manager:
(Mexico) Ignacio Trelles

**19**	Todor Krastev
**2**	Atanas Gerov
**3**	Georgi Hristakiev
**4**	Milko Gaydarski
**6**	Ivaylo Georgiev		(substituted off) 60'
**7**	Tsvetan Veselinov		(substituted off) 68'
**8**	Evgeni Yanchovski	Booked
**9**	Petar Zhekov
**10**	Atanas Mihaylov
**12**	Kiril Stankov
**13**	Asparuh Nikodimov
Substitutions:
**1**	Stoyan Yordanov
**14**	Mihail Gyonin
**15**	Yancho Dimitrov		(substituted on) 60'
**16**	Georgi Tsvetkov
**17**	Ivan Zafirov		(substituted on) 68'
Manager:
(Bulgaria) Georgi Berkov

Assistant referees:
Guillermo Velásquez (Colombia)
Erwin Hieger (Austria)

== Bronze medal match ==
24 October 1968
12:00

Japan	2–0	Mexico
Kamamoto 20', 40'	Report

Azteca Stadium, Mexico City
Attendance: 105,000
Referee: Abraham Klein (Israel)

**1**	Kenzo Yokoyama
**2**	Hiroshi Katayama
**4**	Yoshitada Yamaguchi
**5**	Mitsuo Kamata
**8**	Takaji Mori
**9**	Aritatsu Ogi
**12**	Teruki Miyamoto
**13**	Masashi Watanabe
**15**	Kunishige Kamamoto	Booked
**16**	Ikuo Matsumoto
**17**	Ryūichi Sugiyama
Substitutions:
**18**	Masahiro Hamazaki
**3**	Masakatsu Miyamoto
**6**	Ryozo Suzuki
**10**	Eizo Yuguchi
**14**	Yasuyuki Kuwahara
Manager:
(Japan) Shunichiro Okano

**1**	Javier Vargas
**2**	Juan Manuel Alejándrez
**4**	Héctor Sanabria
**5**	Mario Pérez
**6**	Luis Regueiro
**9**	Luis Estrada	(substituted off) 37'
**10**	Vicente Pereda
**11**	Cesáreo Victorino	(substituted off) 37'
**14**	Javier Sánchez
**16**	Juan Ignacio Basaguren
**18**	Albino Morales
Substitutions:
**12**	Jesús Mendoza
**3**	Humberto Medina
**15**	Elías Muñoz	(substituted on) 37'
**17**	José Álvarez
**19**	Bernardo Hernández	(substituted on) 37'
Manager:
(Mexico) Ignacio Trelles

Assistant referees:
Shakibudeen Thompson (Nigeria)
Augusto Robles (Guatemala)

== Gold medal match ==
26 October 1968
12:00

Bulgaria	1–4	Hungary
Veselinov 22'	Report	Menczel 40' A. Dunai 41', 49' Juhász 62'

Azteca Stadium, Mexico City
Attendance: 75,000
Referee: Diego Di Leo (Mexico)

**Bulgaria**	**Hungary**

**1**	Stoyan Yordanov
**2**	Atanas Gerov
**3**	Georgi Hristakiev
**4**	Milko Gaydarski
**5**	Kiril Ivkov	(red card) 44'
**6**	Ivaylo Georgiev
**7**	Tsvetan Veselinov	(red card) 43'
**8**	Evgeni Yanchovski		(substituted off) 54'
**9**	Petar Zhekov	Booked
**10**	Atanas Mihaylov	(red card) 44'
**13**	Asparuh Nikodimov		(substituted off) 62'
Substitutions:
**19**	Todor Krastev
**12**	Kiril Stankov		(substituted on) 54'
**14**	Mihail Gyonin
**15**	Yancho Dimitrov
**16**	Georgi Tsvetkov		(substituted on) 62'
Manager:
(Bulgaria) Georgi Berkov

**1**	Károly Fatér
**2**	Dezső Novák
**3**	Lajos Dunai
**4**	Miklós Páncsics
**5**	Iván Menczel
**6**	Lajos Szűcs
**7**	László Fazekas
**10**	Antal Dunai
**11**	László Nagy
**14**	Ernő Noskó
**15**	István Juhász	(red card) 85'
Substitutions:
**19**	Zoltán Szarka
**9**	Lajos Kocsis
**12**	László Keglovich
**16**	Miklós Szalay
**17**	István Sárközi
Manager:
(Hungary) Károly Lakat

Assistant referees:
Arturo Yamasaki (Peru)
Alfonso González (Mexico)
