= 1965 CONCACAF Championship squads =

These are the squads for the countries that played in the 1965 CONCACAF Championship.

The age listed for each player is on 28 March 1965, the first day of the tournament. The numbers of caps and goals listed for each player do not include any matches played after the start of the tournament. The club listed is the club for which the player last played a competitive match before the tournament. The nationality for each club reflects the national association (not the league) to which the club is affiliated. A flag is included for coaches who are of a different nationality than their own national team.

== Netherlands Antilles ==
Head coach: Pedro Celestino Dacunha

No.	Pos.	Player	Date of birth (age)	Caps	Club
1	GK	Paul Johan Díaz	19 December 1936 (aged 28)		(Netherlands Antilles) Trupial
2	GK	Víctor Celsio Polinet			(Netherlands Antilles) SUBT
3	DF	Johan Bodak			(Netherlands Antilles) Scherpenheuvel
4	DF	Elsio Martina			(Netherlands Antilles) Jong Colombia
5	DF	Ciro Basilio			(Netherlands Antilles) Vesta
6	DF	Hilario Augusto Bertrand			(Netherlands Antilles) Sithoc
7	DF	Juan Maximiliano Pablo	18 November 1938 (aged 26)		(Netherlands Antilles) Dakota
8	MF	Franklin Victoria			(Netherlands Antilles) Jong Colombia
9	MF	Donald Diego Gosepa			(Netherlands Antilles) Scherpenheuvel
10	MF	Stanley De Lannoy			(Netherlands Antilles) Veendam
11	MF	Englo Dubero	2 October 1941 (aged 23)		(Netherlands Antilles) La Salle
12	MF	Daniel Pablo			(Netherlands Antilles) Dakota
13	MF	Ocando Wernet	2 February 1936 (aged 29)		(Netherlands Antilles) La Salle
14	MF	James Alfonso Richardson			(Netherlands Antilles) Dakota
15	MF	Bernardo Brete			(Netherlands Antilles) Scherpenheuvel
16	FW	Erno Jansen			(Netherlands Antilles) Jong Colombia
17	FW	Virgilio Sillie			(Netherlands Antilles) Sithoc
18	FW	Johan Gumbs			(Netherlands Antilles) Scherpenheuvel
19	FW	Edwin Loran			(Netherlands Antilles) Scherpenheuvel
20	FW	Eugene Testing			(Netherlands Antilles) Sithoc
21	FW	José Bibiana			(Netherlands Antilles) Sithoc
22	FW	Ronald Flocker			(Netherlands Antilles) Jong Holland

== Costa Rica ==
Head coach: Mario Cordero, Alfredo Piedra and Eduardo Viso

No.	Pos.	Player	Date of birth (age)	Caps	Club
1	GK	Emilio Sagot	26 February 1942 (aged 23)		(Costa Rica) Orión
2	GK	Mario Pérez Rodríguez	11 April 1936 (aged 26)		(Costa Rica) Saprissa
3	GK	Didier Gutiérrez	4 November 1942 (aged 22)		(Costa Rica) Municipal Puntarenas
4	DF	Wálter Elizondo	7 April 1930 (aged 34)		(Costa Rica) Saprissa
5	DF	Álvaro Cháves	11 January 1941 (aged 24)		(Costa Rica) Herediano
6	DF	Fernando Jiménez Sánchez	9 December 1932 (aged 32)		(Costa Rica) Cartaginés
7	DF	Edgar Zúñiga	16 October 1941 (aged 23)		(Costa Rica) Alajuelense
8	DF	Álvaro Grant	3 February 1938 (aged 25)		(Costa Rica) Herediano
9	DF	Enrique Briceño			(Costa Rica) Uruguay de Coronado
10	DF	José Manuel Brenes			(Costa Rica) Orión
11	DF	Juan Boyer			(Costa Rica) Limonense
12	MF	William Quirós	10 October 1941 (aged 23)		(Costa Rica) Saprissa
13	MF	Juan José Gámez	8 July 1939 (aged 25)		(Costa Rica) Alajuelense
14	MF	Luis Chacón			(Costa Rica) Uruguay de Coronado
15	MF	Pecas López	14 December 1942 (aged 22)		(Costa Rica) Uruguay de Coronado
16	FW	Edgar Marín	22 May 1943 (aged 21)		(Costa Rica) Saprissa
17	FW	Errol Daniels	17 May 1944 (aged 20)		(Costa Rica) Alajuelense
18	FW	Guido Peña	17 February 1938 (aged 27)		(Costa Rica) Orión
19	FW	Enrique Córdoba	1 August 1938 (aged 26)		(Costa Rica) Cartaginés
20	FW	Leonel Hernández	3 October 1943 (aged 21)		(Costa Rica) Cartaginés
21	FW	Juan González Soto	27 December 1941 (aged 23)		(Costa Rica) Alajuelense
22	FW	Roy Sáenz	5 December 1944 (aged 20)		(Costa Rica) Nicolás Marín
23	FW	Daniel Bosques			(Costa Rica) Municipal Puntarenas

== El Salvador ==
Head coach: (Chile) Hernán Carrasco

No.	Pos.	Player	Date of birth (age)	Caps	Club
1	GK	Gualberto Fernández	12 July 1941 (aged 23)		(El Salvador) Quequeisque
2	GK	Francisco Francés	8 July 1938 (aged 26)		(El Salvador) Atlético Marte
3	GK	José Rodolfo Cea			(El Salvador) Once Municipal
4	DF	Guillermo Castro	25 June 1940 (aged 24)		(El Salvador) Atlético Marte
5	DF	Salvador Mariona	16 December 1943 (aged 21)		(El Salvador) Alianza
6	DF	Mauricio Manzano	30 September 1943 (aged 21)		(El Salvador) UES
7	DF	Julio César Mejía	4 October 1940 (aged 24)		(El Salvador) Atlético Marte
8	DF	Raúl Bonilla			(El Salvador) Águila
9	DF	José René Mena			(El Salvador) Águila
10	MF	Alberto Villalta	19 November 1947 (aged 17)		(El Salvador) Alianza
11	MF	Sergio Méndez	14 February 1942 (aged 23)		(El Salvador) Águila
12	MF	Mauricio Ernesto González	13 May 1942 (aged 22)		(El Salvador) Atlético Marte
13	MF	Jorge Liévano	21 April 1943 (aged 21)		(El Salvador) Once Municipal
14	MF	Rodolfo Artiga Ruiz	22 December 1934 (aged 30)		(El Salvador) Atlante San Alejo
15	MF	Edgar Cabrera	23 December 1944 (aged 20)		(El Salvador) Juventud Olímpica
16	MF	Armando Chacón	9 May 1941 (aged 23)		(El Salvador) Alianza
17	MF	César Reynosa			(El Salvador) FAS
18	FW	Pipo Rodríguez	12 September 1945 (aged 19)		(El Salvador) UES
19	FW	Mario Monge	27 November 1938 (aged 26)		(El Salvador) Alianza
20	FW	Juan Francisco Barraza	12 March 1935 (aged 30)		(El Salvador) Águila
21	FW	Mario Flores	12 September 1943 (aged 21)		(El Salvador) Alianza
22	FW	Alfredo Ruano	14 October 1932 (aged 32)		(El Salvador) Alianza
23	FW	Eduardo Hernández Martínez			(El Salvador) Alianza

== Guatemala ==
Head Coach: César Viccino

No.	Pos.	Player	Date of birth (age)	Caps	Club
1	GK	Ignacio González Lam	2 April 1944 (aged 20)		(Guatemala) Municipal
2	GK	Guillermo Gamboa	6 April 1936 (aged 28)		(Guatemala) Comunicaciones
3	GK	Héctor Bolaños			(Guatemala) Municipal
4	DF	Alberto López Oliva	10 May 1944 (aged 20)		(Guatemala) Municipal
5	DF	Hugo Montoya	7 August 1941 (aged 23)		(Guatemala) Municipal
6	DF	Roberto Camposeco	6 July 1941 (aged 23)		(Guatemala) Aurora
7	DF	David Molina Rodríguez	1 February 1943 (aged 22)		(Guatemala) Aurora
8	DF	Carlos Enrique Wellmann	21 April 1931 (aged 33)		(Guatemala) Comunicaciones
9	FW	Vicente Charles			(Guatemala) Comunicaciones
10	MF	Jorge Roldán	16 December 1940 (aged 24)		(Guatemala) Aurora
11	MF	Francisco López Contreras	17 September 1934 (aged 30)		(Guatemala) Comunicaciones
12	MF	Rolando Valdez	22 May 1945 (aged 19)		(Guatemala) Municipal
13	MF	Ricardo Clark	27 November 1937 (aged 27)		(Guatemala) Municipal
14	MF	Eduardo de León	30 October 1933 (aged 31)		(Guatemala) Tipografía Nacional
15	MF	Tony Ewing			(Guatemala) Municipal
16	MF	Alberto López Sánchez	3 October 1944 (aged 20)		(Guatemala) Municipal
17	MF	Francisco Martínez			(Guatemala) Comunicaciones
18	FW	Hugo Peña	6 May 1936 (aged 28)		(El Salvador) FAS
19	MF	Fernando de Paz			(Guatemala) Aurora
20	FW	Armando Mazariegos	6 April 1936 (aged 28)		(Guatemala) Ron Botrán
21	FW	Haroldo Juárez	1940 (aged 24–25)		(Guatemala) Comunicaciones
22	FW	Fredy Masella	5 December 1935 (aged 29)		(Guatemala) Comunicaciones
23	FW	Leonel Velázquez			(Guatemala) Municipal

== Haiti ==
Head coach: Antoine Tassy

No.	Pos.	Player	Date of birth (age)	Caps	Club
1	GK	Henri Françillon	26 May 1946 (aged 18)		(Haiti) Victory
2	GK	Michel Blain			(Haiti) Aigle Noir
3	DF	Serge Ducosté	4 February 1944 (aged 21)		(Haiti) Aigle Noir
4	DF	Claudel Legros	23 May 1935 (aged 29)		(Haiti) Victory
5	DF	Raymond Lalane			(Haiti) Racing Haïtien
6	DF	Arsène Auguste	3 February 1951 (aged 14)		(Haiti) Racing Haïtien
7	DF	Formose Gilles	22 October 1942 (aged 22)		(Haiti) Victory
8	DF	René Archelus			(Haiti) Hatüey Bacardi
9	DF	Michel Morin			(Haiti) Victory
10	DF	Wilfred Sorey			(Haiti) Violette
11	MF	Philippe Vorbe	14 September 1947 (aged 17)		(Haiti) Violette
12	MF	Jean-Claude Désir	8 August 1946 (aged 18)		(Haiti) Aigle Noir
13	MF	Joseph Obas	25 May 1940 (aged 24)		(Haiti) Racing Haïtien
14	MF	Claude Limagé			(Haiti) Racing Haïtien
15	MF	Gabriel Fluery			(Haiti) Violette
16	MF	Claude Nemurin			(Haiti) Victory
17	MF	Reynold D'Haiti			(Haiti) Violette
18	MF	Reynold St. Surin			(Haiti) Violette
19	FW	Guy Saint-Vil	21 October 1942 (aged 22)		(Haiti) Racing Haïtien
20	FW	Germain Champagne			(Haiti) Racing Haïtien
21	FW	Jean Claude Saint-Vil			(Haiti) Excelsior
22	FW	Joseph Pierre			(Haiti) Violette

== Mexico ==
Head coach: Ignacio Trelles

No.	Pos.	Player	Date of birth (age)	Caps	Club
1	GK	Javier Vargas Rueda	22 November 1941 (aged 24)	2	(Mexico) Atlas
2	GK	Ignacio Calderón	13 December 1943 (aged 21)		(Mexico) Guadalajara
3	GK	Antonio Carbajal (Note: Player would ultimately not travel with the team.)	7 June 1929 (aged 35)		(Mexico) León
4	DF	Jesús del Muro	30 November 1937 (aged 27)		(Mexico) Atlas
5	DF	Martín Ibarreche	11 November 1943 (aged 21)		(Mexico) América
6	DF	Gustavo Peña	22 November 1941 (aged 23)		(Mexico) Oro
7	DF	Arturo Chaires	14 March 1937 (aged 28)		(Mexico) Guadalajara
8	DF	Guillermo Sepúlveda	28 February 1934 (aged 31)		(Mexico) Guadalajara
9	DF	Gabriel Núñez Aguirre	6 February 1942 (aged 23)		(Mexico) Zacatepec
10	DF	Ignacio Jáuregui	31 July 1938 (aged 26)		(Mexico) Monterrey
11	MF	José Luis González Dávila	14 September 1942 (aged 22)		(Mexico) UNAM
12	MF	Antonio Munguía	27 June 1942 (aged 22)		(Mexico) Necaxa
13	MF	Ramiro Navarro	25 May 1943 (aged 21)		(Mexico) Oro
14	MF	Ernesto Cisneros	26 October 1940 (aged 24)		(Mexico) Zacatepec
15	FW	Felipe Ruvalcaba	16 February 1941 (aged 24)		(Mexico) Oro
16	FW	Javier Valdivia	4 December 1941 (aged 23)		(Mexico) Guadalajara
17	FW	Isidoro Díaz	14 March 1938 (aged 27)		(Mexico) Guadalajara
18	FW	Salvador Reyes Monteón	20 September 1936 (aged 28)		(Mexico) Guadalajara
19	FW	José Luis Aussín	20 January 1942 (aged 23)		(Mexico) Veracruz
20	FW	Aarón Padilla Gutiérrez	10 July 1942 (aged 22)		(Mexico) UNAM
21	MF	Fernando Bustos	1 August 1944 (aged 20)		(Mexico) Cruz Azul
22	FW	Javier Fragoso	19 April 1942 (aged 22)		(Mexico) América
23	FW	Hilario Díaz	23 May 1943 (aged 21)		(Mexico) Cruz Azul
