= Football at the 1962 Asian Games – Men's team squads =

Squads for the Football at the 1962 Asian Games played in Jakarta, Indonesia.

== Group A ==
=== Indonesia ===
Head coach: (Socialist Federal Republic of Yugoslavia) Antun Pogačnik

No.	Pos.	Player	Date of birth (age)	Caps	Goals	Club
1	GK	Judo Hadianto	19 September 1941 (aged 20)			(Football Association of Indonesia) Persija Jakarta
2	DF	Ishak Udin				(Football Association of Indonesia) Persib Bandung
3	DF	Faisal Jusuf				
4	DF	Matseh				
5	DF	Sahruna				(Football Association of Indonesia) PSM Makassar
6	DF	Djadjang Haris				(Football Association of Indonesia) Persib Bandung
7	MF	Fattah Hidajat				(Football Association of Indonesia) Persib Bandung
8	MF	Tan Liong Houw	26 June 1930 (aged 32)			(Football Association of Indonesia) Persija Jakarta
9	FW	Emen Suwarman	18 May 1939 (aged 23)			(Football Association of Indonesia) Persib Bandung
10	MF	Januar Pribadi	26 January 1931 (aged 31)			(Football Association of Indonesia) Persebaya Surabaya
11	FW	Hengki Timisela				(Football Association of Indonesia) Persib Bandung
12	GK	Harry Tjong	24 September 1939 (aged 22)			(Football Association of Indonesia) PSM Makassar
13	DF	Supardi				
14	DF	M.T. Yusuf				
15	MF	Sunarnoyo				(Football Association of Indonesia) Persib Bandung
16	FW	Marinus Manuhutu				
17	FW	Solong Hajah				(Football Association of Indonesia) PSM Makassar
18	FW	Sulbi Saifuddin				
19	MF	Mubarok				
20	FW	Siswandi				(Football Association of Indonesia) Persib Bandung
21	MF	Ahmadsjah Silalahi	9 March 1942 (aged 20)			(Football Association of Indonesia) PSMS Medan
22	GK	Sahala Siregar				(Football Association of Indonesia) PSMS Medan

=== South Vietnam ===
Head coach: (South Vietnam)

No.	Pos.	Player	Date of birth (age)	Caps	Goals	Club
	GK					
	DF					
	DF					
	MF					
	DF					
	MF					
	FW					
	FW					
	FW					
	FW					
	FW					

=== Philippines ===
Head coach: (Philippines) Fernando Giménez Álvarez

No.	Pos.	Player	Date of birth (age)	Caps	Goals	Club
	GK	Eddie Pe				Lions F.C.
		Elino Salvalosa				
	DF	Jerry Vaflor				
	DF	Orlando Plagata				William Lines
	MF	Ed Ocampo				
		Slim Amaguin				
		Reynaldo Reyes				
		Jose Soberon				
		Cesar Brillantes				
		Baltazar Dimasuay				
		Abelardo Limjoco				
		Alex Pacheco				
	FW	Danny Wienecke				
		Antonio Guidotti				
	FW	George Aldeguer				
	FW	Eddie Pacheco				
	FW	Joey Villareal				
	FW	Pepe Teh				Lions F.C.

=== Malaya ===
Head coach: (Federation of Malaya)

No.	Pos.	Player	Date of birth (age)	Caps	Goals	Club
	GK	Sexton Lourdes				(Football Association of Malaysia) Selangor FA
	DF	Yee Seng Choy				(Football Association of Malaysia) Perak FA
	DF	Abdullah Nordin				(Football Association of Malaysia) Selangor FA
	DF	Edwin Dutton				(Football Association of Malaysia) Selangor FA
	MF	Liam Boey Cheong				(Football Association of Malaysia) Penang FA
	MF	Roslan Buang				(Football Association of Malaysia) Selangor FA
	MF	I.J. Singh				(Football Association of Malaysia) Selangor FA
	FW	M. Govindarajoo				(Football Association of Malaysia) Selangor FA
	FW	Arthur Koh				(Football Association of Malaysia) Selangor FA
	FW	Robert Choe				(Football Association of Malaysia) Malacca FA
	FW	Abdul Ghani Minhat				(Football Association of Malaysia) Selangor FA
	FW	Stanley Gabrielle				(Football Association of Malaysia) Selangor FA
	FW	Ibrahim Mydin				(Football Association of Malaysia) Penang FA
		Kamaruddin Ahmad				(Football Association of Malaysia) Perak FA
		Richard Choe				(Football Association of Malaysia) Malacca FA
		Ungku Ismail				(Football Association of Malaysia) Johor FA
		Mahat Ambu				(Football Association of Malaysia) Perak FA
		Ahmad Nazari				(Football Association of Malaysia) Perak FA

== Group B ==
=== Thailand ===
Head coach: (Thailand)

No.	Pos.	Player	Date of birth (age)	Caps	Goals	Club
	GK	Amaroktanond				
	GK	Ansit				
	DF	Pranbeebutr				
	DF	Chaichareon				
	MF	Suphot Panich	20 July 1936 (aged 26)			
	DF	Chalerm Jones				
	MF	Asdang Panikabuir				
	FW	Suchat Metugun				
	FW	Boonlert Nilpirom				
	FW	Yanyong Na-Nongkai				
	FW	Vichit Yambooruang				
	FW	Panananda				
		Yongyouth Sangkagowit				
		Tamanuso				
		Samruay Chaiyonk				
		Narong Sangkasuwan				
		Prakob				
		Praderm Muankasem				
		Yasoyoso				
		Chatchai Paholpat				
		Schikato				

=== Japan ===
Head coach: (Japan) Hidetoki Takahashi

No.	Pos.	Player	Date of birth (age)	Caps	Goals	Club
	GK	Tsukasa Hosaka	3 March 1937 (aged 25)			(Japan Football Association) Furukawa Electric
	DF	Yasuo Takamori	3 March 1934 (aged 28)			(Japan Football Association) Nippon Kokan
	DF	Masakatsu Miyamoto	4 August 1938 (aged 24)			(Japan Football Association) Furukawa Electric
	MF	Ryuzo Hiraki	7 October 1931 (aged 30)			(Japan Football Association) Furukawa Electric
	DF	Michihiro Ozawa	25 December 1932 (aged 29)			(Japan Football Association) Toyo Industries
	DF	Mitsuo Kamata	16 December 1937 (aged 24)			(Japan Football Association) Furukawa Electric
	FW	Masao Uchino	21 April 1934 (aged 28)			(Japan Football Association) Furukawa Electric
	FW	Shigeo Yaegashi	24 March 1933 (aged 29)			(Japan Football Association) Furukawa Electric
	FW	Saburō Kawabuchi	3 December 1936 (aged 25)			(Japan Football Association) Furukawa Electric
	MF	Teruki Miyamoto	2 December 1940 (aged 21)			(Japan Football Association) Nippon Steel
	FW	Masashi Watanabe	11 January 1936 (aged 26)			(Japan Football Association) Nippon Steel
	DF	Ryozo Suzuki	20 September 1939 (aged 22)			(Japan Football Association) Hitachi
	MF	Shozo Tsugitani	25 June 1940 (aged 22)			(Japan Football Association) Mitsubishi Motors
	FW	Ryuichi Sugiyama	4 July 1941 (aged 21)			(Japan Football Association) Mitsubishi Motors

=== India ===
Head coach: (India) Syed Abdul Rahim

No.	Pos.	Player	Date of birth (age)	Caps	Goals	Club
	GK	Pradyut Barman				(All India Football Federation) Railways
	GK	Peter Thangaraj	24 December 1935 (aged 26)			(All India Football Federation) Mohammedan Sporting
	DF	Chandrashekar Menon	10 July 1935 (aged 27)			(All India Football Federation) Bombay
	DF	Tarlok Singh				(All India Football Federation) Services
	MF	Fortunato Franco				(All India Football Federation) Bombay
	DF	Jarnail Singh	20 February 1936 (aged 26)			(All India Football Federation) Mohun Bagan
	MF	Ram Bahadur Chhetri	15 February 1937 (aged 25)			(All India Football Federation) East Bengal
	FW	Pradip Kumar Banerjee	23 June 1936 (aged 26)			(All India Football Federation) Railways
	FW	Mohammed Yousuf Khan	5 August 1937 (aged 25)			(All India Football Federation) Hyderabad City Police
	FW	D.M.K. Afzal				(All India Football Federation) Hyderabad City Police
	FW	Chuni Goswami (c)	15 January 1938 (aged 24)			(All India Football Federation) Mohun Bagan
	FW	Tulsidas Balaram	4 October 1936 (aged 25)			(All India Football Federation) East Bengal
	MF	Prasanta Sinha				(All India Football Federation) Bengal
	FW	D. Ethiraj	1 July 1934 (aged 28)			(All India Football Federation) Services
	FW	Arumainayagam				(All India Football Federation) Mohun Bagan
	DF	Arun Ghosh	7 July 1941 (aged 21)			(All India Football Federation) East Bengal

=== South Korea ===
Head coach: (South Korea) Min Byung-dae

No.	Pos.	Player	Date of birth (age)	Caps	Goals	Club
	GK	Ham Heung-chul	17 November 1930 (aged 31)			(Korea Football Association) ROK Army Office of the Provost Marshal General FC
	GK	Chung Yeong-hwan	7 December 1938 (aged 23)			(Korea Football Association) Korea Electric Power FC
	DF	Kim Hong-bok	4 March 1935 (aged 27)			(Korea Football Association) Cheil Industries FC
	DF	Cho Nam-soo	16 January 1933 (aged 29)			(Korea Football Association) Korea Tungsten Company FC
	DF	Son Kyung-ho	30 May 1939 (aged 23)			(Korea Football Association) ROK Army Engineer Corps FC
	DF	Park Seung-ok	28 January 1938 (aged 24)			(Korea Football Association) Korea Tungsten Company FC
	DF	Cha Joon-man	17 June 1937 (aged 25)			(Korea Football Association) ROK Army Engineer Corps FC
	MF	Kim Doo-seon	9 December 1937 (aged 24)			(Korea Football Association) Korea Tungsten Company FC
	MF	Kim Chan-ki	30 December 1932 (aged 29)			(Korea Football Association) ROK Army Office of the Provost Marshal General FC
	MF	Cha Tae-sung	8 October 1934 (aged 27)			(Korea Football Association) Cheil Industries FC
	FW	Chung Soon-choon	15 January 1940 (aged 22)			(Korea Football Association) Cheil Industries FC
	FW	Cho Yoon-ok	25 February 1940 (aged 22)			(Korea Football Association) Korea Tungsten Company FC
	FW	Park Kyung-hwa	2 June 1939 (aged 23)			(Korea Football Association) ROK Army Office of the Provost Marshal General FC
	FW	Jang Seok-woo	30 April 1935 (aged 27)			(Korea Football Association) Korea Tungsten Company FC
	FW	Kim Duk-joong	29 April 1940 (aged 22)			(Korea Football Association) Korea Electric Power FC
	FW	Jang Ji-un	6 November 1938 (aged 23)			(Korea Football Association) Korea Tungsten Company FC
	FW	Moon Jung-sik	23 June 1930 (aged 32)			(Korea Football Association) ROK Army CIC FC
	FW	Lee Hyun	20 January 1942 (aged 20)			(Korea Football Association) ROK Army CIC FC
