= Kriengsak =

Kriengsak or Kriangsak (Thai: เกรียงศักดิ์) is a Thai given name. Notable people with the name include:

- Kriangsak Chamanan (1917–2003), prime minister of Thailand from 1977 to 1980
- Kriengsak Chareonwongsak, Thai scholar and politician
- Kriengsak Kovitvanit (born 1949), Archbishop of Bangkok
- Kriengsak Nukulsompratana (born 1948), Thai footballer
- Kriengsak Varavudhi (born 1948), Thai cyclist
- Kriengsak Vimolsate (born 1942), Thai footballer
