= Luiz Henrique (footballer, born 1949) =

Brazilian footballer

Personal information
- Full name: Luiz Henrique Byron de Mello
- Date of birth: 25 February 1949 (age 77)
- Place of birth: Rio de Janeiro, Brazil
- Height: 1.72 m (5 ft 8 in)
- Position: Midfielder

Senior career*
Years	Team	Apps	(Gls)
- Flamengo

International career
- Brazil Olympic
- * Club domestic league appearances and goals

Luiz Henrique Byron de Mello (born 25 February 1949), known as just Luiz Henrique, is a Brazilian former footballer who played as a midfielder for Flamengo. He competed in the men's tournament at the 1968 Summer Olympics.
