= Dušan Bartovič =

Slovak footballer (1944–2020)

Personal information
- Date of birth: 4 March 1944
- Place of birth: Veľké Kostoľany, Czechoslovakia
- Date of death: 1 April 2020 (aged 76)

Senior career*
Years	Team	Apps	(Gls)
1965–1972	Jednota Trenčín	146	(17)

International career
1970	Czechoslovakia	2	(0)
- * Club domestic league appearances and goals

Dušan Bartovič (4 March 1944 – 1 April 2020) was a Slovak footballer. He scored 17 goals in 146 appearances in the Czechoslovak First League playing for Jednota Trenčín. Bartovič competed in the men's tournament at the 1968 Summer Olympics. He won two caps for the Czechoslovakia national football team.
