= Edgar Chacón =

Guatemalan footballer

Personal information
- Date of birth: 30 March 1945
- Place of birth: Guatemala City, Guatemala
- Date of death: 13 August 2005 (aged 60)

International career
Years	Team	Apps	(Gls)
- Guatemala

Edgar Chacón (30 March 1945 – 13 August 2005) was a Guatemalan footballer. He competed in the men's tournament at the 1968 Summer Olympics.
