= Josef Linhart =

Czechoslovak footballer

Personal information
- Date of birth: 15 May 1944 (age 82)
- Place of birth: Kladno, Czechoslovakia

International career
Years	Team	Apps	(Gls)
- Czechoslovakia

Josef Linhart (born 15 May 1944) is a Czechoslovak footballer. He competed in the men's tournament at the 1968 Summer Olympics.
