= Horacio Hasse =

Guatemalan footballer

Personal information
- Date of birth: 13 July 1945 (age 81)
- Place of birth: Senahú, Guatemala

International career
Years	Team	Apps	(Gls)
- Guatemala
Medal record
Men's football
Representing Guatemala
CONCACAF Championship
Winner	1967 Honduras
Runner-up	1969 Costa Rica

Horacio Hasse (born 13 July 1945) is a Guatemalan footballer. He competed in the men's tournament at the 1968 Summer Olympics.

== Honours ==
Guatemala

- CONCACAF Championship: 1967; Runner-up, 1969
