= Peter Mutkovič =

Slovak footballer

Personal information
- Full name: Peter Mutkovič
- Date of birth: 19 October 1945
- Place of birth: Bratislava, Czechoslovakia
- Date of death: 28 December 2023 (aged 78)
- Place of death: Bratislava, Slovakia
- Position: Defender

Senior career*
Years	Team	Apps	(Gls)
1965–1975	Slovan ChZJD Bratislava	163	(0)
1975–1976	ZVL Žilina	8	(0)

International career
1970	Czechoslovakia	2	(0)
- * Club domestic league appearances and goals

Peter Mutkovič (19 October 1945 – 28 December 2023) was a Slovak footballer. He competed in the men's tournament at the 1968 Summer Olympics. On a club level he is best remembered as a player of Slovan Bratislava. He won two caps for the Czechoslovakia national football team.
