= Roberto Camposeco =

Guatemalan footballer (1941–2001)

Roberto Camposeco Marquéz
- Camposeco in 1968

Personal information
- Date of birth: 6 July 1941
- Place of birth: Guatemala City, Guatemala
- Date of death: 2 January 2002 (aged 60)

Senior career*
Years	Team	Apps	(Gls)
1961–1973	Aurora		
1973–1975	Universidad		

International career
1965–1973	Guatemala		
Medal record
Men's football
Representing Guatemala
CONCACAF Championship
Runner-up	1965 Guatemala
- * Club domestic league appearances and goals

Roberto Camposeco Marquéz (6 July 1941 – 2 January 2002) was a Guatemalan football player who played as a defender. He represented his country at the 1965 CONCACAF Championship and the 1968 Summer Olympics. He also played for Aurora and Universidad.

== Honours ==
Guatemala

- CONCACAF Championship: Runner-up, 1965
