= Miroslav Kráľ =

Slovak footballer (1947–2025)

Personal information
- Date of birth: 2 November 1947
- Place of birth: Topoľčany, Czechoslovakia
- Date of death: 2 October 2025 (aged 77)
- Position: Forward

Senior career*
| Years | Team | Apps | (Gls) |
| 1966–1975 | TJ ZVL Žilina | | |
| 1975–1976 | Spartak ŠK Dubnica | | |

International career
| 1968 | Czechoslovakia | 4 | (0) |

Managerial career
- 1994: ŠK Žilina
- * Club domestic league appearances and goals

Miroslav Kráľ (2 November 1947 – 2 October 2025) was a Slovak footballer who played as a forward. He competed in the men's tournament at the 1968 Summer Olympics.

On 2 October 2025, it was announced that he had died at the age of 77.
