= Nachman Castro =

Israeli footballer

Personal information
- Date of birth: 23 January 1948 (age 78)
- Place of birth: İzmir, Turkey

International career
Years	Team	Apps	(Gls)
- Israel

Nachman Castro (born 23 January 1948) is an Israeli former footballer. He competed in the men's tournament at the 1968 Summer Olympics.
