= Ladislav Pajerchin =

Slovak footballer

Personal information
- Date of birth: 4 November 1944
- Place of birth: Krásna Hôrka, Hungary
- Date of death: 2 February 2014 (aged 69)
- Place of death: Považská Bystrica, Slovakia

International career
Years	Team	Apps	(Gls)
- Czechoslovakia

Ladislav Pajerchin (4 November 1944 – 2 February 2014) was a Slovak footballer. He competed in the men's tournament at the 1968 Summer Olympics.
