= Jaroslav Findejs =

Czechoslovak footballer

Personal information
- Date of birth: 25 September 1943 (age 83)
- Place of birth: Prague, Czechoslovakia

International career
Years	Team	Apps	(Gls)
- Czechoslovakia

Jaroslav Findejs (born 25 September 1943) is a Czechoslovak footballer. He competed in the men's tournament at the 1968 Summer Olympics.
