= Július Holeš =

Slovak footballer (1939–2021)

Personal information
- Date of birth: 18 March 1939
- Place of birth: Košice, Czechoslovakia
- Date of death: 19 August 2021 (aged 82)

International career
Years	Team	Apps	(Gls)
- Czechoslovakia

Július Holeš (18 March 1939 – 19 August 2021) was a Slovak footballer. He competed in the men's tournament at the 1968 Summer Olympics. Holeš died on 19 August 2021, at the age of 82.
