= Chirawat Pimpawatin =

Thai footballer

Chirawat Pimpawatin (born 30 November 1952) is a Thai former footballer who competed in the 1968 Summer Olympics.
