= Mikuláš Krnáč =

Slovak footballer (1947–2025)

Personal information
- Date of birth: 15 February 1947
- Place of birth: Ratka, Czechoslovakia
- Date of death: 23 November 2025 (aged 78)
- Height: 1.82 m (6 ft 0 in)
- Position: Forward

Senior career*
Years	Team	Apps	(Gls)
- Inter Bratislava

International career
- Czechoslovakia
- * Club domestic league appearances and goals

Mikuláš Krnáč (15 February 1947 – 23 November 2025) was a Slovak footballer who played as a forward for Inter Bratislava. He competed in the men's tournament at the 1968 Summer Olympics. Krnáč died on 23 November 2025, at the age of 78.
