= Vichai Sanghamkichakul =

Thai footballer

Vichai Sanghamkichakul (born 22 August 1947) is a Thai former footballer who competed in the 1968 Summer Olympics.
