= Pavel Stratil =

Czechoslovak footballer

Personal information
- Date of birth: 17 April 1945 (age 81)
- Place of birth: Olomouc, Czechoslovakia

Senior career*
Years	Team	Apps	(Gls)
1966–1975	TJ Sklo Union Teplice		
1975–1977	TJ Sparta ČKD Praha		

International career
1970–1975	Czechoslovakia	19	(2)
- * Club domestic league appearances and goals

Pavel Stratil (born 17 April 1945) is a Czechoslovak footballer. He competed in the men's tournament at the 1968 Summer Olympics. On a club level, Stratil played for Teplice and Sparta Prague. He won two caps for Czechoslovakia.
