= Miloš Herbst =

Czech footballer

Personal information
- Date of birth: 6 May 1942
- Place of birth: Brno, Czechoslovakia
- Date of death: 2 May 2024 (aged 81)

International career
Years	Team	Apps	(Gls)
- Czechoslovakia

Miloš Herbst (6 May 1942 – 2 May 2024) was a Czechoslovak footballer. He competed in the men's tournament at the 1968 Summer Olympics.
