= Narong Thongpleow =

Thai footballer

Narong Thongpleow (born 29 September 1947) is a Thai former footballer who competed in the 1968 Summer Olympics.
