= Saravuth Pathipakornchai =

Thai footballer (1947–2024)

Saravuth Pathipakornchai (Thai: สราวุธ ประทีปากรชัย; 10 April 1947 – 24 March 2024) was a Thai footballer who competed in the 1968 Summer Olympics. Pathipakornchai died on 24 March 2024, at the age of 76.
