= Hugo Torres (footballer) =

Guatemalan footballer

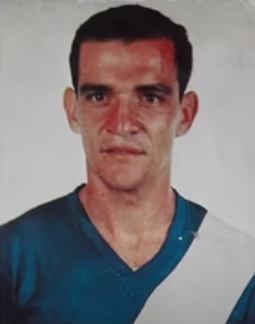

Personal information
- Full name: Hugo Ricardo Torres Ocampo
- Date of birth: 9 July 1945 (age 81)
- Place of birth: Guatemala City, Guatemala

International career
Years	Team	Apps	(Gls)
- Guatemala
Medal record
Men's football
Representing Guatemala
CONCACAF Championship
Winner	1967 Honduras
Runner-up	1969 Costa Rica

Hugo Ricardo Torres Ocampo (born 9 July 1945) is a Guatemalan footballer. He competed in the men's tournament at the 1968 Summer Olympics.

== Honours ==
Guatemala

- CONCACAF Championship: 1967; Runner-up, 1969
