= Jaroslav Boroš =

Slovak footballer

Personal information
- Full name: Jaroslav Boroš
- Date of birth: 5 November 1947 (age 78)
- Place of birth: Vranov nad Topľou, Czechoslovakia
- Position: Striker

Senior career*
Years	Team	Apps	(Gls)
1965–1969	FC VSS Košice		
1969	FC Lokomotíva Košice		
1970–1977	FC VSS Košice		

International career
1967	Czechoslovakia	1	(0)
1967–1968	Czechoslovakia Olympic	5	(1)
- * Club domestic league appearances and goals

Jaroslav Boroš (born 5 November 1947) is a Slovak former football striker who played for his hometown club Vranov nad Topľou and from the age of 18 for VSS Košice from 1965 to 1977. He played 230 matches and scored 29 goals during his career in the Czechoslovak First League.

Boroš made one appearance for the Czechoslovakia national football team, his debut coming against Spain in the 2-1 UEFA Euro 1968 qualifying loss at Santiago Bernabéu Stadium in October 1967. He also played for Czechoslovakia at the 1968 Summer Olympics and for the Czechoslovakia national under-23 team.
