= Chow On-iam =

Thai footballer

Chow On-iam (born 10 August 1951) is a Thai former footballer who competed in the 1968 Summer Olympics.
