= Ignacio González (footballer, born 1944) =

Guatemalan footballer

Personal information
- Full name: Ignacio González Lam
- Date of birth: 16 June 1944 (age 82)
- Place of birth: Guatemala City, Guatemala

International career
Years	Team	Apps	(Gls)
- Guatemala
Medal record
Men's football
Representing Guatemala
CONCACAF Championship
Winner	1967 Honduras
Runner-up	1965 Guatemala
Runner-up	1969 Costa Rica

Ignacio González Lam (born 16 June 1944) is a Guatemalan footballer. He competed in the men's tournament at the 1968 Summer Olympics.

== Honours ==
Guatemala

- CONCACAF Championship: 1967; Runner-up, 1965, 1969
