= Snong Chaiyong =

Thai footballer

Snong Chaiyong is a Thai former footballer who competed in the 1968 Summer Olympics, the second and last time Thailand had an Olympics presence in football. He comes from a family of six brothers, all of whom were members of the Thailand national football team (Snong from 1965 to 1972).
