= Günther Glomb =

German footballer and manager

Personal information
- Date of birth: 17 August 1930
- Place of birth: Germany
- Date of death: 13 August 2015 (aged 84)
- Place of death: Austria
- Position: Forward

Senior career*
Years	Team	Apps	(Gls)
1951–1959	1. FC Nürnberg	166	(66)
1959–1961	SV Wiesbaden		
1961–1963	Wuppertaler SV	23	(4)

Managerial career
- 1965–1967: Bonner SC
- 1967–1968: SpVg Frechen 20
- 1968–1975: Thailand
- * Club domestic league appearances and goals

Gunther Glomb (17 August 1930 in Germany – 13 August 2015 in Austria) was a German football manager who last worked as head coach of the Thailand national football team.

== Career ==
Glomb started his managerial career with Bonner SC, After that, he coached SpVg Frechen 20. In 1968, he was appointed head coach of the Thailand national football team, a position he held until 1975.
