= Jeron Slusher =

Guatemalan footballer (1944–2016)

Personal information
- Full name: Jeron Augusto Slusher Dayle
- Date of birth: 7 November 1944
- Place of birth: Izabal, Guatemala
- Date of death: 16 March 2016 (aged 71)
- Place of death: Izabal, Guatemala

International career
Years	Team	Apps	(Gls)
- Guatemala
Medal record
Men's football
Representing Guatemala
CONCACAF Championship
Winner	1967 Honduras

Jeron Slusher (7 November 1944 – 16 March 2016) was a Guatemalan footballer. He competed in the men's tournament at the 1968 Summer Olympics. He died on 16 March 2016, at the age of 72.

== Honours ==
Guatemala

- CONCACAF Championship: 1967
