= Antonio García (footballer, born 1940) =

Guatemalan footballer

Personal information
- Date of birth: 5 July 1940 (age 86)
- Place of birth: Guatemala City, Guatemala

International career
Years	Team	Apps	(Gls)
- Guatemala

Antonio García (born 5 July 1940) is a Guatemalan footballer. He competed in the men's tournament at the 1968 Summer Olympics.
