= Hugo Montoya =

Guatemalan footballer (born 1941)

Personal information
- Full name: Hugo Francisco Montoya Palencia
- Date of birth: 7 August 1941 (age 85)
- Place of birth: Guatemala City, Guatemala

Senior career*
Years	Team	Apps	(Gls)
1961–1973	Municipal		

International career
1965–1973	Guatemala		
Medal record
Men's football
Representing Guatemala
CONCACAF Championship
Runner-up	1965 Guatemala
Runner-up	1969 Costa Rica
- * Club domestic league appearances and goals

Hugo Francisco Montoya Palencia (born 7 August 1941) is a Guatemalan footballer. He competed in the men's tournament at the 1968 Summer Olympics.

== Honours ==
Guatemala

- CONCACAF Championship: Runner-up, 1965, 1969
