= Jiří Večerek =

Czechoslovak footballer (1943–2022)

Personal information
- Date of birth: 4 August 1943
- Place of birth: Ostrava, Czechoslovakia
- Date of death: 14 July 2022 (aged 78)

Senior career*
Years	Team	Apps	(Gls)
1963–1972	Baník Ostrava	165	(8)

International career
1970	Czechoslovakia	2	(0)
- * Club domestic league appearances and goals

Jiří Večerek (4 August 1943 – 14 July 2022) was a Czechoslovak footballer. He competed in the men's tournament at the 1968 Summer Olympics. On a club level he played for Baník Ostrava. Večerek also won two caps for Czechoslovakia national team.
