= Paiboon Unyapo =

Thai footballer (born 1948)

Paiboon Unyapo (born 14 July 1948) is a Thai former footballer who competed in the 1968 Summer Olympics.
