= Juan Fernández (footballer, born 1948) =

Spanish footballer (born 1948)

Personal information
- Full name: Juan Fernández Vilela
- Date of birth: 16 September 1948 (age 78)
- Place of birth: Ferrol, Spain

Senior career*
Years	Team	Apps	(Gls)
1966–1969	Racing de Ferrol	54	(10)
1969–1980	Celta de Vigo	294	(45)
1980–1983	Pontevedra		

International career
1968	Spain (Olympics)		
- * Club domestic league appearances and goals

Juan Fernández Vilela (born 16 September 1948) is a former Spanish footballer. He competed in the men's tournament at the 1968 Summer Olympics.
