= Elías Muñoz =

Mexican footballer (born 1941)

Personal information
- Full name: Elías Muñoz García
- Date of birth: 3 November 1941 (age 84)
- Place of birth: Pénjamo, Guanajuato, Mexico
- Position: Forward

Senior career*
| Years | Team | Apps | (Gls) |
- Tigres UANL

International career
| 1966–1968 | Mexico | 8 | (0) |
- * Club domestic league appearances and goals

Elías Muñoz García (born 3 November 1941) is a Mexican former professional football forward who played for Mexico in the 1966 FIFA World Cup. He also played for Tigres UANL.
