= Udomsilp Sornbutnark =

Thai footballer (born 1948)

Udomsilp Sornbutnark (born 1 June 1948) is a Thai former footballer who competed in the 1968 Summer Olympics.
