= Boonlert Nilpirom =

Thai footballer

Boonlert Nilpirom (Thai: บุญเลิศ นิลภิรมย์; born 10 September 1947) is a Thai former footballer who competed in the 1968 Summer Olympics.
