= Julio Rodolfo García =

Guatemalan footballer

Personal information
- Date of birth: 23 November 1945 (age 80)
- Place of birth: Guatemala City, Guatemala

International career
Years	Team	Apps	(Gls)
- Guatemala
Medal record
Men's football
Representing Guatemala
CONCACAF Championship
Winner	1967 Honduras

Julio Rodolfo García (born 23 November 1945) is a Guatemalan footballer. He competed at the 1968 Summer Olympics and the 1976 Summer Olympics.

== Honours ==
Guatemala

- CONCACAF Championship: 1967
