= Javier Vargas (footballer) =

Mexican footballer (born 1941)

Personal information
- Full name: Javier Vargas Rueda
- Date of birth: 22 November 1941 (age 84)
- Place of birth: Guadalajara, Jalisco, Mexico
- Height: 1.76 m (5 ft 9 in)
- Position: Goalkeeper

Senior career*
Years	Team	Apps	(Gls)
1962–1973	Atlas		
1973–1974	San Luis		
1974–1975	Atlas		
1975–1979	Jalisco		

International career
1966–1969	Mexico	17	(0)
- * Club domestic league appearances and goals

Javier Vargas Rueda (born 22 November 1941) is a Mexican former football goalkeeper who played for Mexico in the 1966 FIFA World Cup. He also played for Club Atlas.
