= Yongyouth Sangkagowit =

Thai footballer

Yongyouth Sangkagowit (born 4 October 1941) is a Thai former footballer who competed in the 1968 Summer Olympics.
