= Ivaylo Georgiev =

Bulgarian footballer

Personal information
- Full name: Ivaylo Nikolov Georgiev
- Date of birth: 31 October 1942 (age 83)
- Place of birth: Montana, Bulgaria
- Position: Midfielder

Youth career
- Cherveno Zname Sofia

Senior career*
Years	Team	Apps	(Gls)
1961–1963	Sliven	?	(?)
1963–1965	Akademik Sofia	15	(2)
1965–1968	Lokomotiv Sofia	85	(18)
1969–1971	Slavia Sofia	48	(7)
1971–1973	Lokomotiv Sofia	54	(4)

International career
1967–1968	Bulgaria	10	(2)
Medal record
Representing Bulgaria
Men's football
Silver medal – second place	1968 Mexico	Team
- * Club domestic league appearances and goals

Ivaylo Georgiev (born 31 October 1942) is a former Bulgarian footballer who played as a midfielder. He competed at the 1968 Summer Olympics in Mexico City, where he won a silver medal with the Bulgaria national team.
