= Milko Gaydarski =

Bulgarian footballer

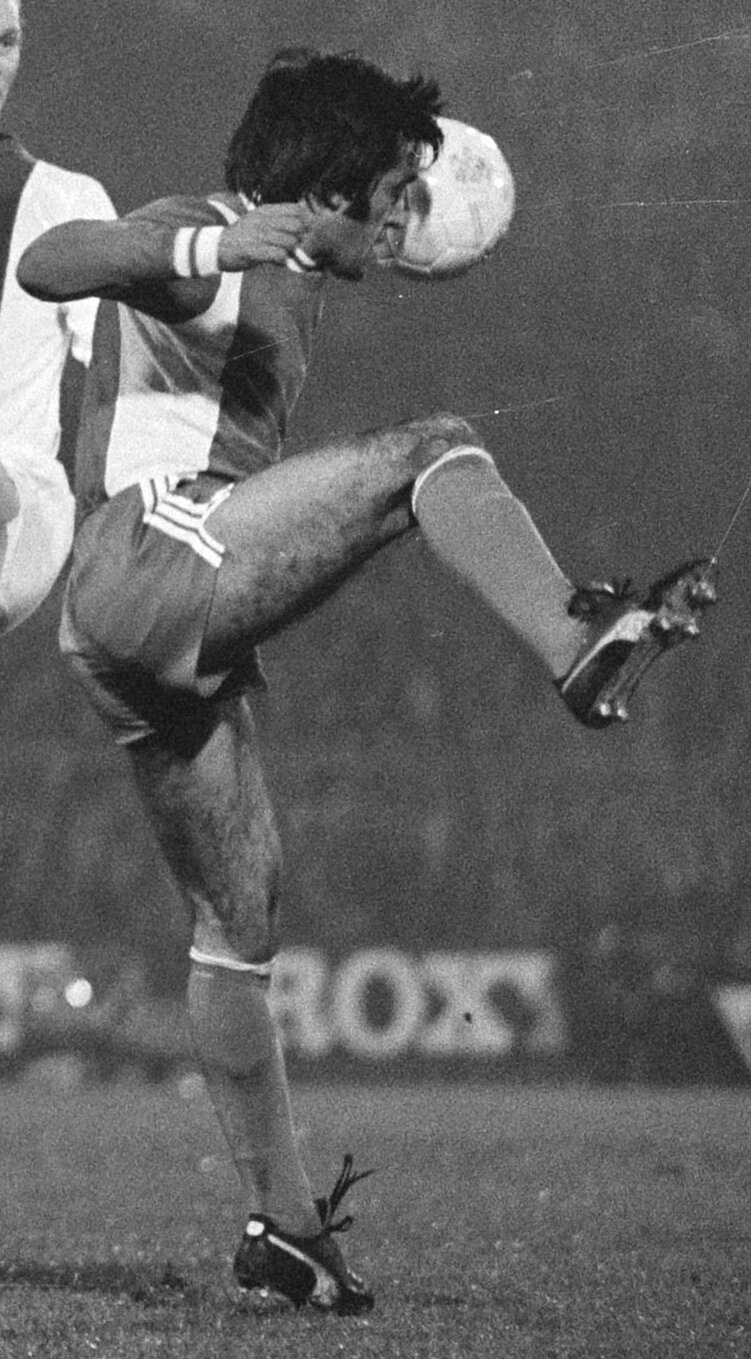
- Gaydarski with Levski in 1975

Personal information
- Full name: Milko Trilov Gaydarski
- Date of birth: 18 March 1946
- Place of birth: Sofia, Bulgaria
- Date of death: 23 December 1989 (aged 43)
- Place of death: Sofia, Bulgaria
- Position: Defender

Senior career*
Years	Team	Apps	(Gls)
1962–1968	Spartak Sofia	154	(4)
1968–1977	Levski Sofia	187	(3)
Total		341	(7)

International career
1967–1973	Bulgaria	30	(0)
- * Club domestic league appearances and goals

Milko Trilov Gaydarski (Bulgarian: Милко Трилов Гайдарски; 18 March 1946 – 23 December 1989) was a Bulgarian football defender who played for Bulgaria in the 1970 FIFA World Cup and in the 1968 Summer Olympics in Mexico City where Bulgaria won silver.

At the club level, Gaydarski played for Spartak Sofia (1962–1968) and Levski Sofia (1968–1977). He won the Bulgarian Cup five times (1968 with Spartak, 1970, 1971, 1976, 1977 with Levski) and the Bulgarian league three times (1970, 1974, 1977 with Levski).
