= Ivan Zafirov =

Bulgarian footballer (1947–2025)

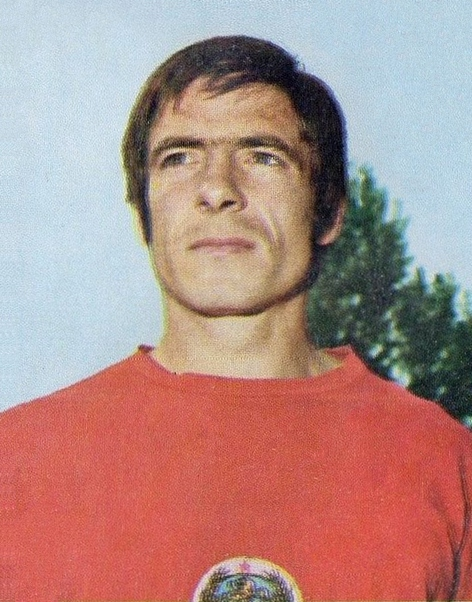

Personal information
- Full name: Ivan Georgiev Zafirov
- Date of birth: 30 December 1947
- Place of birth: Sofia, Bulgaria
- Date of death: 15 October 2025 (aged 77)
- Height: 1.76 m (5 ft 9 in)
- Position: Right-back

Youth career
- 1957–1965: CSKA Sofia

Senior career*
Years	Team	Apps	(Gls)
1965–1966	CSKA Sofia	16	(1)
1966–1968	Sliven	24	(1)
1968–1981	CSKA Sofia	324	(3)
Total		364	(5)

International career
1968–1980	Bulgaria	50	(1)
Medal record
Olympic Games
Silver medal – second place	1968 Mexico City	Team competition
- * Club domestic league appearances and goals

Ivan Georgiev Zafirov (Bulgarian: Иван Георгиев Зафиpoв; 30 December 1947 – 15 October 2025) was a Bulgarian footballer who played as a defender.

== Biography ==
After short spells at Sliven, it was with CSKA Sofia that he found his spiritual home in the 1970s. Zafirov, a right-back, played 340 times for the Reds, scoring 8 goals. Nine Bulgarian championships and five Bulgarian Cups tell the tale of how successful Zafirov was.

Zafirov was on Bulgaria's roster for the 1974 FIFA World Cup. He represented the Lions 50 times, scoring once. He also won a silver medal at the 1968 Summer Olympics.

Zafirov died on 15 October 2025, at the age of 77.
