= Mihail Gyonin =

Bulgarian footballer (born 1941)

Personal information
- Full name: Mihail Asenov Gyonin
- Date of birth: 25 November 1941 (age 84)
- Place of birth: Vratsa, Bulgaria
- Position: Forward

Senior career*
Years	Team	Apps	(Gls)
1957–1959	Kom Berkovitsa		
1959–1960	Rodni Krile		
1960–1965	Montana		
1966–1968	Spartak Sofia	98	(33)
1968–1969	Levski Sofia	5	(1)
1969–1970	Spartak Varna	29	(14)
1971–1972	Akademik Sofia		
1972–1975	Montana		

International career
1967–1968	Bulgaria	7	(2)
Medal record
Representing Bulgaria
Men's football
Silver medal – second place	1968 Mexico	Team
- * Club domestic league appearances and goals

Mihail Gyonin (Bulgarian: Михаил Гьонин) (born 25 November 1941) is a retired Bulgarian footballer. He was born in Vratsa. He competed at the 1968 Summer Olympics in Mexico City, where he won a silver medal with the Bulgarian team.
