= Ricardo Clark (Guatemalan footballer) =

Guatemalan footballer (born 1937)

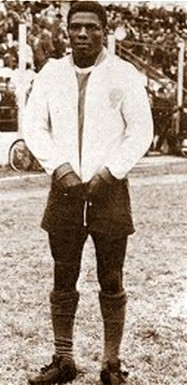

Personal information
- Full name: Ricardo Alexander Clark Henry
- Date of birth: 24 November 1937 (age 88)
- Place of birth: Guatemala City, Guatemala
- Position: Midfielder

Senior career*
| Years | Team | Apps | (Gls) |
| 1959–1961 | Juventud Retalteca | | |
| 1961–1969 | Municipal | | |
| 1966 | → Huracán (loan) | | |
| 1968 | → Toronto Falcons (loan) | | |
| 1969–1970 | Pepsi Cola | | |
| 1970–1971 | Tipografía Nacional | | |

International career
| 1963–1968 | Guatemala | | |
Medal record
Men's football
Representing Guatemala
CONCACAF Championship
| Runner-up | 1965 Guatemala |
- * Club domestic league appearances and goals

Ricardo Alexander Clark Henry (born 24 November 1937) is a Guatemalan footballer. He competed in the men's tournament at the 1968 Summer Olympics.

== Honours ==
Guatemala

- CONCACAF Championship: Runner-up, 1965, 1969
