= Suphot Panich =

Thai footballer (born 1936)

Suphot Panich (born 20 July 1936) is a Thai former footballer who competed in the 1968 Summer Olympics.
