= Luis Villavicencio =

Guatemalan footballer

Personal information
- Date of birth: 3 February 1950 (age 76)
- Place of birth: Guatemala City, Guatemala

International career
Years	Team	Apps	(Gls)
- Guatemala

Luis Villavicencio (born 3 February 1950) is a Guatemalan footballer. He competed at the 1968 Summer Olympics and the 1976 Summer Olympics.
