= Atanas Gerov =

Bulgarian footballer

Personal information
- Full name: Atanas Ivanov Gerov
- Date of birth: 8 October 1945
- Place of birth: Kyustendil, Bulgaria
- Position: Defender

Senior career*
| Years | Team | Apps | (Gls) |
| 1963–1966 | Septemvri Sofia | ? | (?) |
| 1966–1968 | Lokomotiv Sofia | 61 | (0) |
| 1969–1971 | Slavia Sofia | 58 | (1) |
| 1971–1975 | Lokomotiv Sofia | 86 | (1) |

International career
| 1967–1968 | Bulgaria | 7 | (0) |
Medal record
Representing Bulgaria
Men's football
| Silver medal – second place | 1968 Mexico | Team |
- * Club domestic league appearances and goals

Atanas Gerov (Bulgarian: Атанас Геров) (born 1945) is a Bulgarian footballer. He was born in Kyustendil. He competed at the 1968 Summer Olympics in Mexico City, where he won a silver medal with the Bulgarian team.
