= Narong Sangkasuwan =

Thai footballer

Narong Sangkasuwan (Thai: ณรงค์ สังขสุวรรณ; born 19 October 1943) is a Thai former footballer who competed in the 1968 Summer Olympics.
