= Kriengsak Vimolsate =

Thai footballer

Kriengsak Vimolsate (born 13 August 1942) is a Thai former footballer, who competed in the 1968 Summer Olympics.
