= Kriengsak Nukulsompratana =

Thai footballer (born 1948)

Kriengsak Nukulsompratana (born 15 June 1948) is a Thai former footballer who competed in the 1968 Summer Olympics.
