= Praderm Muankasem =

Thai footballer

Praderm Muankasem (born 2 July 1941) is a Thai former footballer who competed in the 1968 Summer Olympics.
