= Todor Krastev =

Bulgarian footballer

Personal information
- Full name: Todor Krastev Nikolov
- Date of birth: 1 June 1945
- Place of birth: Stara Zagora, Bulgaria
- Date of death: 9 May 2000 (aged 54)
- Position: Goalkeeper

Senior career*
Years	Team	Apps	(Gls)
1964–1974	Beroe	203	(0)
1974–1977	Sliven	73	(0)
1977–1981	Beroe	61	(0)
Total		337	(0)

International career
1967–1977	Bulgaria	8	(0)
Medal record
Representing Bulgaria
Men's football
Silver medal – second place	1968 Mexico	Team
- * Club domestic league appearances and goals

Todor Krastev (Bulgarian: Тодор Кръстев; 1 June 1945 – 9 May 2000) was a Bulgarian footballer. He was born in Stara Zagora. He competed at the 1968 Summer Olympics in Mexico City, where he won a silver medal with the Bulgarian team.
