= 1965 CONCACAF Championship =

Campeonato de Naciones de CONCACAF 1965

Tournament details
- Host country: Guatemala
- Dates: 28 March – 11 April
- Teams: 6 (from 1 confederation)

Final positions
- Champions: Mexico (1st title)
- Runners-up: Guatemala
- Third place: Costa Rica
- Fourth place: El Salvador

Tournament statistics
- Matches played: 15
- Goals scored: 49 (3.27 per match)

The 1965 CONCACAF Championship, was the 2nd edition of the CONCACAF Championship, the tournament was held in Guatemala from 28 March to 11 April. It had 6 participating teams.

== Qualifying round ==
=== Caribbean Zone ===
Jamaica, Trinidad, Dominican Republic withdrew from qualifying due to a schedule clash with qualification for the 1966 FIFA World Cup.

Hosts of the final tournament, Guatemala refused to grant the Cubans visas to visit the country.

Cuba complained to Helmut Käser, FIFA's General Secretary requesting for FIFA not to recognise CONCACAF. Käser stated that FIFA could not do so and referred the issue of Guatemalan visas for the Cubans to CONCACAF. As they were not able to enter the competition, Cuba withdrew.

Haiti and Netherlands Antilles automatically qualified for the final round.

=== Central American Zone ===
Panama withdrew before the qualifying tournament began.

Pos	Team	Pld	W	D	L	GF	GA	GD	Pts	Qualification
1	El Salvador	2	2	0	0	7	1	+6	4	Final round
2	Nicaragua	2	1	0	1	2	4	−2	2	
3	Honduras	2	0	0	2	1	5	−4	0	

7 March 1965

El Salvador	4–0	Nicaragua
González 49', 67', 84'; Barraza 63'

Estadio Nacional Flor Blanca, San Salvador

11 March 1965

Nicaragua	2–0	Honduras
Jirón 36'; Barrios 87'

Estadio Nacional Flor Blanca, San Salvador

14 March 1965

El Salvador	3–1	Honduras
Monge 33'; Méndez 48'; Liévano 90'		Castillo 84'

Estadio Nacional Flor Blanca, San Salvador

=== North America Zone ===
Team 1	Agg.	Team 2	1st leg	2nd leg
Mexico	w/o	United States	w/o	w/o

United States withdrew. Mexico automatically qualified.

== Participating teams ==
- Costa Rica (defending champion)
- El Salvador
- Guatemala (host)
- Haiti
- Mexico
- Netherlands Antilles

== Venues ==
Guatemala City
Estadio Mateo Flores
Capacity: 35,000
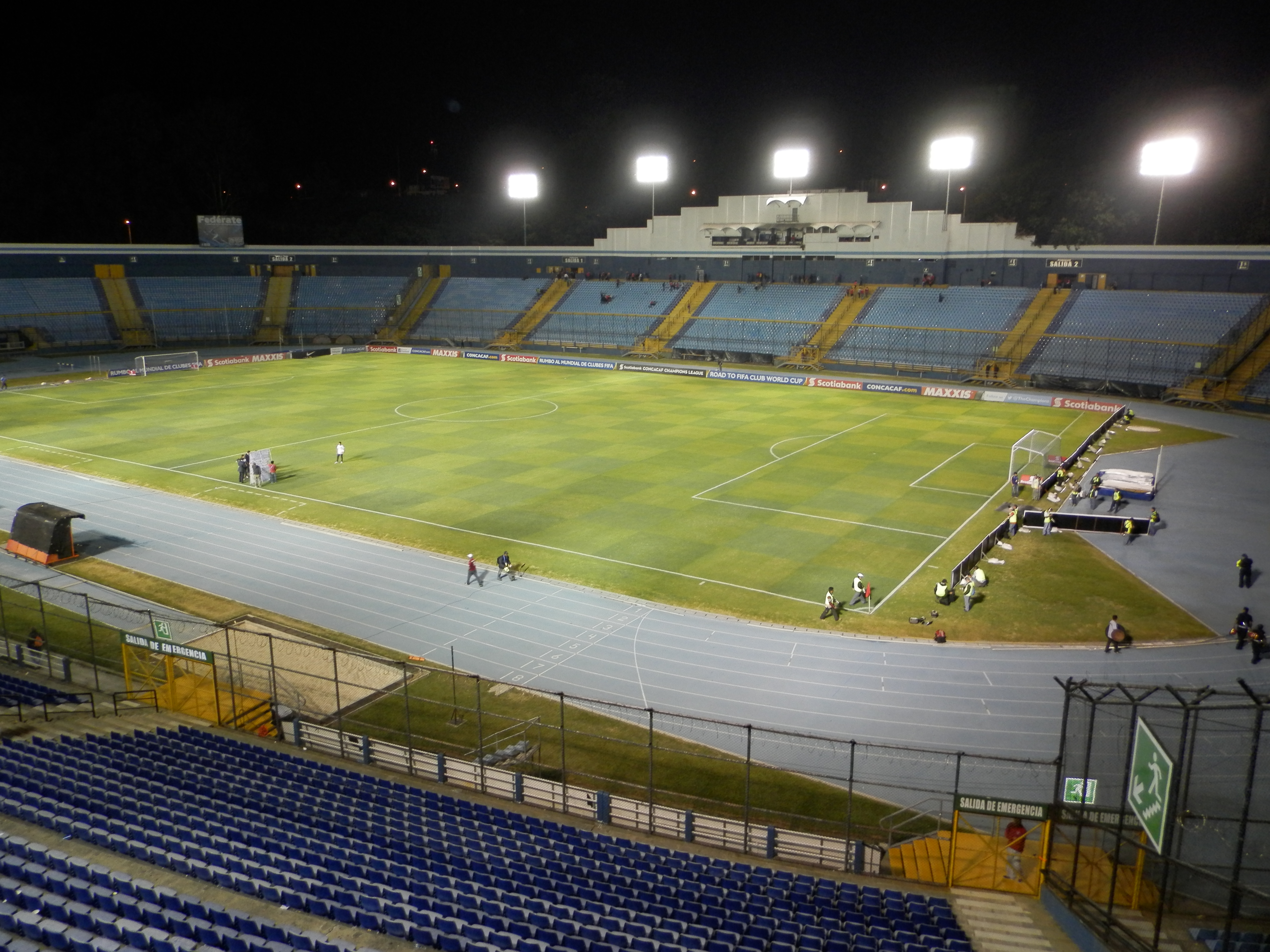

== Final round ==
Pos	Team	Pld	W	D	L	GF	GA	GD	Pts
1	Mexico (C)	5	4	1	0	13	2	+11	9
2	Guatemala	5	3	1	1	11	5	+6	7
3	Costa Rica	5	2	2	1	11	4	+7	6
4	El Salvador	5	2	1	2	7	9	−2	5
5	Netherlands Antilles	5	0	2	3	4	16	−12	2
6	Haiti	5	0	1	4	3	13	−10	1

(C) Champions
28 March 1965

Mexico	2–0	El Salvador
Díaz 22'; Valdivia 55'

Estadio Mateo Flores, Guatemala City

28 March 1965

Guatemala	3–0	Haiti
Peña 12'; López 24'; Valdez 67'

Estadio Mateo Flores, Guatemala City

28 March 1965

Costa Rica	6–0	Netherlands Antilles
Hernández 16'; Peña 30', 42', 44', 67'; Quirós 51'

Estadio Mateo Flores, Guatemala City

30 March 1965

Costa Rica	3–1	Haiti
Marín 8'; Hernández 26', 85'		Saint-Vil 67'

Estadio Mateo Flores, Guatemala City

30 March 1965

El Salvador	1–1	Netherlands Antilles
Hernández 8'		Sillie 59'

Estadio Mateo Flores, Guatemala City

1 April 1965

Mexico	5–0	Netherlands Antilles
Fragoso 57', 85'; Cisneros 71', 86', 89'

Estadio Mateo Flores, Guatemala City

1 April 1965

Guatemala	0–0	Costa Rica

Estadio Mateo Flores, Guatemala City

4 April 1965

Guatemala	4–1	El Salvador
De Paz 16'; De León 31'; Valdez 40'; Clark 88'		Méndez 58'

Estadio Mateo Flores, Guatemala City

4 April 1965

Mexico	3–0	Haiti
Cisneros 30', 39'; Fragoso 41'

Estadio Mateo Flores, Guatemala City

6 April 1965

Guatemala	3–2	Netherlands Antilles
Peña 10', 49'; Bertrand 65' (o.g.)		Loran 26'; Sillie 47'

Estadio Mateo Flores, Guatemala City

6 April 1965

Mexico	1–1 (Note: Match suspended at 70' due to fight between both teams, after extensive deliberations the organizing committee decided to end the match; result stood.)	Costa Rica
Ruvalcaba 45'		Zúñiga 9'

Estadio Mateo Flores, Guatemala City
Referee: Aguilar (Guatemala)

8 April 1965

Netherlands Antilles	1–1	Haiti
Testing 62'		Obas 84'

Estadio Mateo Flores, Guatemala City

8 April 1965

Costa Rica	1–2	El Salvador
Hernández 63' (pen.)		Rodríguez 44', 60'

Estadio Mateo Flores, Guatemala City

11 April 1965

El Salvador	3–1	Haiti
Méndez 34'; Barraza 49'; González 79'		Saint-Vil 22'

Estadio Mateo Flores, Guatemala City

11 April 1965

Guatemala	1–2	Mexico
Roldán 7'		Cisneros 24'; Fragoso 35'

Estadio Mateo Flores, Guatemala City

=== Notes ===
1965 CONCACAF Championship winners

Mexico
First title

== Team of the Tournament ==
Ideal XI by RSSSF
Goalkeeper	Defenders	Midfielders	Forwards
(Costa Rica) Emilio Sagot	(Guatemala) Alberto López (Mexico) Gustavo Peña (Mexico) Jesús del Muro (Costa Rica) Álvaro McDonald	(El Salvador) Alberto Villalta (Costa Rica) Juan José Gámez (Mexico) Ernesto Cisneros	(Costa Rica) Guido Peña (Mexico) Javier Fragoso (Guatemala) Hugo Peña
