= Carlos Valdez (Guatemalan footballer) =

Guatemalan footballer (born 1945)

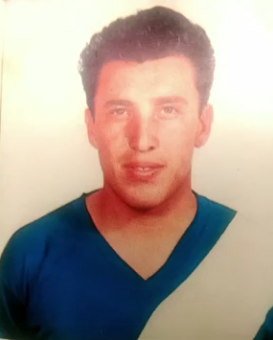

Personal information
- Full name: Carlos Rolando Valdez Pérez
- Date of birth: 22 May 1945 (age 81)
- Place of birth: Guatemala City, Guatemala

Senior career*
| Years | Team | Apps | (Gls) |
| 1962–1970 | Municipal | | |
| 1961–1973 | Aurora | | |
| 1973–1974 | Municipal | | |
| 1975–1976 | Galcasa | | |

International career
| 1962–1969 | Guatemala | | |
Medal record
Men's football
Representing Guatemala
CONCACAF Championship
| Winner | 1967 Honduras |
- * Club domestic league appearances and goals

Carlos Rolando Valdez Pérez (born 22 May 1945) is a Guatemalan footballer. He competed in the men's tournament at the 1968 Summer Olympics.

== Honours ==
Guatemala

- CONCACAF Championship: 1967
