= Football at the 1968 Summer Olympics =

Tournament details
- Host country: Mexico
- Dates: 13–26 October 1968
- Teams: 16 (from 5 confederations)
- Venues: 4 (in 4 host cities)

Final positions
- Champions: Hungary (3rd title)
- Runners-up: Bulgaria
- Third place: Japan
- Fourth place: Mexico

Tournament statistics
- Matches played: 32
- Goals scored: 116 (3.63 per match)
- Top scorer: (Japan) Kunishige Kamamoto (7 goals)

The 1968 Olympic football tournament was played as part of the 1968 Summer Olympics. The tournament features 16 men's national teams from five continental confederations. The 16 teams are drawn into four groups of four and each group plays a round-robin tournament. At the end of the group stage, the top two teams advanced to the knockout stage, beginning with the quarter-finals and culminating with the gold medal match at the Azteca Stadium on 26 October 1968. This was the first time an Asian team won a medal, Japan claiming bronze.

== Qualification ==
Africa (3)

- Guinea
- Ghana
- Nigeria

Asia (3)

- Israel
- Japan
- Thailand

Europe (5)

- Bulgaria
- Czechoslovakia
- France
- Hungary (holders)
- Spain

North America (3)

- El Salvador
- Guatemala
- Mexico (hosts)

South America (2)

- Brazil
- Colombia

== Venues ==
Mexico City	Puebla	Guadalajara	León
Estadio Azteca	Estadio Cuauhtémoc	Estadio Jalisco	Estadio León
Capacity: 104,000	Capacity: 35,563	Capacity: 31,891	Capacity: 23,609
Football at the 1968 Summer Olympics is located in Mexico

== Medalists ==
Gold	Silver	Bronze
Hungary	Bulgaria	Japan
István Básti; Antal Dunai; Lajos Dunai; Ernő Noskó; Dezső Novák; Károly Fatér; László Fazekas; István Juhász; László Keglovich; Lajos Kocsis; Iván Menczel; László Nagy; Miklós Páncsics; István Sárközi; Lajos Szűcs; Zoltán Szarka; Miklós Szalai	Stoyan Yordanov; Atanas Gerov; Georgi Hristakiev; Milko Gaydarski; Kiril Ivkov; Ivaylo Georgiev; Tsvetan Veselinov; Evgeni Yanchovski; Petar Zhekov; Atanas Hristov; Asparuh Donev; Kiril Stankov; Georgi Ivanov; Todor Nikolov; Yancho Dimitrov; Ivan Zafirov; Mihail Gyonin; Georgi Vasilev	Kenzo Yokoyama; Hiroshi Katayama; Masakatsu Miyamoto; Yoshitada Yamaguchi; Mitsuo Kamata; Ryozo Suzuki; Kiyoshi Tomizawa; Takaji Mori; Aritatsu Ogi; Eizo Yuguchi; Shigeo Yaegashi; Teruki Miyamoto; Masashi Watanabe; Yasuyuki Kuwahara; Kunishige Kamamoto; Ikuo Matsumoto; Ryuichi Sugiyama; Masahiro Hamazaki

== Group stage ==
All times are Central Standard Time (UTC-6).

=== Group A ===
Pos	Team	Pld	W	D	L	GF	GA	GD	Pts	Qualification
1	France	3	2	0	1	8	4	+4	4	Advance to knockout stage
2	Mexico (H)	3	2	0	1	6	4	+2	4	Advance to knockout stage
3	Colombia	3	1	0	2	4	5	−1	2	
4	Guinea	3	1	0	2	4	9	−5	2	

Source: FIFA
(H) Hosts
13 October 1968
12:00

Mexico	1–0	Colombia
Estrada 6'	Report

Estadio Azteca, Mexico City
Referee: István Zsolt (Hungary)
13 October 1968
12:00

France	3–1	Guinea
Hallet 61'; Horlaville 64'; Périgaud 70'	Report	Camara 79'

Estadio Cuauhtémoc, Puebla
Referee: Milivoje Gugulovic (Yugoslavia)

15 October 1968
15:30

France	4–1	Mexico
Case 20', 69'; Teamboueon 30'; Medina 36' (o.g.)	Report	Victorino 26'

Estadio Azteca, Mexico City
Referee: Erwin Hieger (Peru)
15 October 1968
15:30

Guinea	3–2	Colombia
M. Camara 26'; F. Camara 58', 84'	Report	Santa 49'; Mosquera 66'

Estadio Cuauhtémoc, Puebla
Referee: Dimitar Rumenchev (Bulgaria)

17 October 1968
15:30

Mexico	4–0	Guinea
Pereda 70', 85'; Pulido 86', 88'	Report

Estadio Azteca, Mexico City
Referee: Suvaree Wanchai (Thailand)
17 October 1968
15:30

Colombia	2–1	France
Tamayo 14'; Jaramillo 35'	Report	Teamboueon 59'

Estadio Cuauhtémoc, Puebla
Referee: Karol Galba (Czechoslovakia)

=== Group B ===
Pos	Team	Pld	W	D	L	GF	GA	GD	Pts	Qualification
1	Spain	3	2	1	0	4	0	+4	5	Advance to knockout stage
2	Japan	3	1	2	0	4	2	+2	4	Advance to knockout stage
3	Brazil	3	0	2	1	4	5	−1	2	
4	Nigeria	3	0	1	2	4	9	−5	1	

Source: FIFA
14 October 1968
15:30

Spain	1–0	Brazil
Fernández 77'	Report

Estadio Azteca, Mexico City
Referee: Abraham Klein (Israel)
14 October 1968
15:30

Japan	3–1	Nigeria
Kamamoto 24', 72', 89'	Report	Garba 33'

Estadio Cuauhtémoc, Puebla
Referee: Ramón Mármol (El Salvador)

16 October 1968
15:30

Spain	3–0	Nigeria
Ortuño 27'; Grande 52', 69'	Report

Estadio Azteca, Mexico City
Referee: Augusto Robles (Guatemala)
16 October 1968
15:30

Brazil	1–1	Japan
Ferretti 9'	Report	Watanabe 83'

Estadio Cuauhtémoc, Puebla
Referee: George Lamptey (Ghana)

18 October 1968
15:30

Spain	0–0	Japan
	Report

Estadio Azteca, Mexico City
Referee: Erwin Hieger (Austria)
16 October 1968
15:30

Brazil	3–3	Nigeria
Ferretti 50'; Olumodeji 59' (o.g.); Tião 65'	Report	Olayombo 10', 41'; Anieke 19'

Estadio Cuauhtémoc, Puebla
Referee: George Lamptey (Ghana)

=== Group C ===
Ghana replaced Morocco, who refused to play against Israel.

Pos	Team	Pld	W	D	L	GF	GA	GD	Pts	Qualification
1	Hungary	3	2	1	0	8	2	+6	5	Advance to knockout stage
2	Israel	3	2	0	1	8	6	+2	4	Advance to knockout stage
3	Ghana	3	0	2	1	6	8	−2	2	
4	El Salvador	3	0	1	2	2	8	−6	1	

Source: FIFA
14 October 1968
12:00

Hungary	4–0	El Salvador
Menczel 19'; Dunai 47'; Fazekas 51'; Sárközi 68'	Report

Estadio Jalisco, Guadalajara
Referee: Diego Di Leo (Mexico)
14 October 1968
12:00

Israel	5–3	Ghana
Spiegel 11', 75'; Faigenbaum 16', 30', 70'	Report	Jabir 18', 79'; Gbadamosi 35'

Estadio León, León
Referee: Michel Kitabdjian (France)

16 October 1968
15:30

Hungary	2–2	Ghana
Dunai 15'; Menczel 17'	Report	Sunday 12'; Sampene 33'

Estadio Jalisco, Guadalajara
Referee: Yoshiyuki Maruyama (Japan)
16 October 1968
15:30

Israel	3–1	El Salvador
Talbi 20'; Spiegler 44'; Bar 85'	Report	Martínez 35'

Estadio León, León
Referee: Shakibudeen Thompson (Nigeria)

18 October 1968
15:30

Hungary	2–0	Israel
Dunai 40', 75'	Report

Estadio Jalisco, Guadalajara
Referee: Arturo Yamasaki (Peru)
18 October 1968
15:30

El Salvador	1–1	Ghana
Rodríguez 42'	Report	Kofi 55'

Estadio León, León
Referee: Mariano Medina Iglesias (Spain)

=== Group D ===
Pos	Team	Pld	W	D	L	GF	GA	GD	Pts	Qualification
1	Bulgaria	3	2	1	0	11	3	+8	5	Advance to knockout stage
2	Guatemala	3	2	0	1	6	3	+3	4	Advance to knockout stage
3	Czechoslovakia	3	1	1	1	10	3	+7	3	
4	Thailand	3	0	0	3	1	19	−18	0	

Source: FIFA
14 October 1968
12:00

Guatemala	1–0	Czechoslovakia
Stokes 28'	Report

Estadio Jalisco, Guadalajara
Referee: Romualdo Arppi Filho (Brazil)
14 October 1968
12:00

Bulgaria	7–0	Thailand
Gyonin 25'; Zhekov 55'; Mihaylov 56', 61'; Zafirov 73'; Nikodimov 85'; Ivkov 88'	Report

Estadio Nou Camp, León
Referee: Guillermo Velásquez (Colombia)

16 October 1968
12:00

Bulgaria	2–2	Czechoslovakia
Georgiev 44'; Zhekov 77'	Report	Jarabinský 25'; Petráš 42'

Estadio Jalisco, Guadalajara
Referee: Abel Aguilar Elizalde (Mexico)
16 October 1968
12:00

Guatemala	4–1	Thailand
N. Melgar 23', 85'; Roldán 55'; López Oliva 67'	Report	Udomsilp 44'

Estadio Nou Camp, León
Referee: Jean-Louis Faber (Guinea)

18 October 1968
12:00

Bulgaria	2–1	Guatemala
Nikodimov 50'; Zhekov 84'	Report	López Oliva 88'

Estadio Nou Camp, León
Referee: Raúl Osorio (Mexico)
18 October 1968
12:00

Czechoslovakia	8–0	Thailand
Herbst 12'; Petráš 17', 18', 67'; Stratil 28', 34'; Večerek 38'; Krnáč 83'	Report

Estadio Jalisco, Guadalajara
Referee: Felipe Buergo Elcuaz (Mexico)

== Knockout stage ==
=== Bracket ===
Quarter-finals
20 October – Puebla
Mexico	2
Spain	0
20 October – Leon
Bulgaria	1
Israel	1
20 October – Guadalajara
Hungary	1
Guatemala	0
20 October – Mexico City
Japan	3
France	1

Semi-finals
22 October – Guadalajara
Mexico	2
Bulgaria	3
22 October – Mexico City
Hungary	5
Japan	0

Gold medal match
26 October – Mexico City
Bulgaria	1
Hungary	4
Bronze medal match
24 October – Mexico City
Japan	2
Mexico	0

=== Quarter-finals ===
20 October 1968
12:00

Japan	3–1	France
Kamamoto 27', 59'; Watanabe 70'	Report	Teamboueon 32'

Azteca Stadium, Mexico City
Referee: Seyoum Tarekegn (Ethiopia)

20 October 1968
12:00

Mexico	2–0	Spain
Morales 34'; Pereda 48'	Report

Estadio Cuauhtémoc, Puebla
Referee: Milivoje Gugulović (Yugoslavia)

20 October 1968
12:00

Hungary	1–0	Guatemala
Szűcs 69'	Report

Estadio Jalisco, Guadalajara
Referee: Arturo Yamasaki (Peru)

20 October 1968
12:00

Bulgaria	1–1	Israel
Hristakiev 5'	Report	Feigenbaum 89'

Estadio Nou Camp, León
Referee: Michel Kitabdjian (France)

Bulgaria won the match against Israel after coin-toss. No extra time was played.

=== Semi-finals ===
22 October 1968
12:00

Hungary	5–0	Japan
Szűcs 30', 60', 75'; Novák 53', 65'	Report

Azteca Stadium, Mexico City
Referee: Romualdo Arppi Filho (Brazil)

22 October 1968
12:00

Mexico	2–3	Bulgaria
Morales 39'; Pulido Rodríguez 48'	Report	Zhekov 8'; Mihaylov 9'; Veselinov 58'

Estadio Jalisco, Guadalajara
Referee: Seyoum Tarekegn (Ethiopia)

=== Bronze medal match ===
24 October 1968
12:00

Japan	2–0	Mexico
Kamamoto 20', 40'	Report

Azteca Stadium, Mexico City
Attendance: 105,000
Referee: Abraham Klein (Israel)

=== Gold medal match ===
26 October 1968
12:00

Bulgaria	1–4	Hungary
Veselinov 22'	Report	Menczel 40' A. Dunai 41', 49' Juhász 62'

Azteca Stadium, Mexico City
Attendance: 75,000
Referee: Diego Di Leo (Mexico)

== Statistics ==
=== Goalscorers ===
With seven goals, Kunishige Kamamoto of Japan is the top scorer in the tournament. In total, 116 goals were scored by 68 different players, with two of them credited as own goals.

7 goals

- (Japan) Kunishige Kamamoto

6 goals

- (Hungary) Antal Dunai

4 goals

- (Bulgaria) Petar Zhekov
- (Czechoslovakia) Ladislav Petráš
- (Hungary) Lajos Szűcs
- (Israel) Yehoshua Feigenbaum

3 goals

- (Bulgaria) Atanas Mihaylov
- (France) Charles Teamboueon
- (Hungary) Iván Menczel
- (Mexico) Pulido Rodríguez
- (Mexico) Vicente Pereda

2 goals

- (Brazil) Fernando Ferretti
- (Bulgaria) Asparuh Nikodimov
- (Bulgaria) Tsvetan Veselinov
- (Czechoslovakia) Pavel Stratil
- (France) Marc-Kanyan Case
- (Ghana) Malik Jabir
- (Guatemala) Alberto López Oliva
- (Guatemala) Nelson Melgar
- (Guinea) Fodé Bouya Camara
- (Hungary) Dezső Novák
- (Israel) Giora Spiegel
- (Japan) Masashi Watanabe
- (Mexico) Albino Morales
- (Nigeria) Kenneth Olayombo
- (Spain) Toni Grande

1 goal

- (Brazil) Tião
- (Bulgaria) Ivaylo Georgiev
- (Bulgaria) Mihail Gyonin
- (Bulgaria) Georgi Hristakiev
- (Bulgaria) Kiril Ivkov
- (Bulgaria) Ivan Zafirov
- (Colombia) Alfonso Jaramillo
- (Colombia) Fabio Mosquera
- (Colombia) Gustavo Santa
- (Colombia) Javier Tamayo
- (Czechoslovakia) Miloš Herbst
- (Czechoslovakia) Jozef Jarabinský
- (Czechoslovakia) Mikuláš Krnáč
- (Czechoslovakia) Jiří Večerek
- (El Salvador) Juan Ramón Martínez
- (El Salvador) Pipo Rodríguez
- (France) Gérard Hallet
- (France) Daniel Horlaville
- (France) Daniel Perrigaud
- (Ghana) Gbadamosi Amosa
- (Ghana) Osei Kofi
- (Ghana) Ibrahim Sunday
- (Ghana) Sammy Stevens Sampene
- (Guatemala) Jorge Roldán
- (Guatemala) David Stokes
- (Guinea) Maxime Camara
- (Guinea) N'Dongo Camara
- (Hungary) László Fazekas
- (Hungary) István Juhász
- (Hungary) István Sárközi
- (Israel) Shraga Bar
- (Israel) Mordechai Spiegler
- (Israel) Rachamim Talbi
- (Mexico) Luis Estrada
- (Mexico) Cesáreo Victorino
- (Nigeria) Peter Anieke
- (Nigeria) Samuel Okoye
- (Spain) Juan Fernández Vilela
- (Spain) Fernando Ortuño
- (Thailand) Udomsilp Sornbutnark

Own goals

- (Mexico) Humberto Medina (playing against France)
- (Nigeria) Segun Olumodeji (playing against Brazil)

=== Final ranking ===
As per statistical convention in football, matches decided in extra time are counted as wins and losses, while matches decided by penalty shoot-outs are counted as draws.

Pos	Team	Pld	W	D	L	GF	GA	GD	Pts	Final result
1st place, gold medalist(s)	Hungary	6	5	1	0	18	3	+15	11	Gold medal
2nd place, silver medalist(s)	Bulgaria	6	3	2	1	16	10	+6	8	Silver medal
3rd place, bronze medalist(s)	Japan	6	3	2	1	9	8	+1	8	Bronze medal
4	Mexico	6	3	0	3	10	9	+1	6	Fourth place
5	Israel	4	2	1	1	9	7	+2	5	Eliminated in quarter-finals
6	Spain	4	2	1	1	4	2	+2	5	Eliminated in quarter-finals
7	France	4	2	0	2	9	7	+2	4	Eliminated in quarter-finals
8	Guatemala	4	2	0	2	6	4	+2	4	Eliminated in quarter-finals
9	Czechoslovakia	3	1	1	1	10	3	+7	3	Eliminated in group stage
10	Colombia	3	1	0	2	4	5	−1	2	Eliminated in group stage
11	Guinea	3	1	0	2	4	9	−5	2	Eliminated in group stage
12	Ghana	3	0	2	1	6	8	−2	2	Eliminated in group stage
13	Brazil	3	0	2	1	4	5	−1	2	Eliminated in group stage
14	Nigeria	3	0	1	2	4	9	−5	1	Eliminated in group stage
15	El Salvador	3	0	1	2	2	8	−6	1	Eliminated in group stage
16	Thailand	3	0	0	3	1	19	−18	0	Eliminated in group stage

Source: Olympics
