= Football at the 1968 Summer Olympics – Group B =

Football at the Summer Olympics group

Group B of the 1968 Summer Olympics football tournament took place from 14 to 18 October 1968. The group consisted of Brazil, Japan, Nigeria, Spain. The top two teams, Spain and Japan, advanced to the quarter-finals.

== Teams ==
Team	Region	Method of qualification	Date of qualification	Finals appearance	Last appearance	Previous best performance							
Team	Region	Method of qualification	Date of qualification	Finals appearance	Last appearance	Previous best performance	Japan	Asia	Asia Group 1 winners	10 October 1967	4th	1964	Quarter-finals (1936, 1964)
Spain	Europe	Europe Group 4 winners	1 April 1968	4th	1928	Silver medal (1920)							
Brazil	South America	CONMEBOL final group winners	9 April 1968	4th	1964	Quarter-finals (1952)							
Nigeria	Africa	Africa Group 2 winners	4 May 1968	1st	—	—							

== Standings ==
Pos	Team	Pld	W	D	L	GF	GA	GD	Pts	Qualification
1	Spain	3	2	1	0	4	0	+4	5	Advance to knockout stage
2	Japan	3	1	2	0	4	2	+2	4	Advance to knockout stage
3	Brazil	3	0	2	1	4	5	−1	2	
4	Nigeria	3	0	1	2	4	9	−5	1	

Source: FIFA

In the quarter-finals:

- The winners of Group B, Spain, advanced to play the runners-up of Group A, Mexico.
- The runners-up of Group B, Japan, advanced to play the winners of Group A, France.

== Matches ==
=== Spain vs Brazil ===
14 October 1968
15:30

Spain	1–0	Brazil
Fernández 77'	Report

Estadio Azteca, Mexico City
Referee: Abraham Klein (Israel)

Spain	Brazil

2	Pere Valentí Mora
3	Goyo Benito	(yellow card) 50'
4	Francisco Espíldora
6	Miguel Ángel Ochoa
7	Isidro Sala
8	Juan Manuel Asensi
11	Rafael Jaén
15	Juan Fernández
16	José Luis Garzón
17	Toni Grande	(substituted off) 68'
19	Fernando Ortuño
Substitutions:
1	Andrés Mendieta
5	José García
9	Javier Ciáurriz
10	José María Igartua
13	Crispi	(substituted on) 68'
Manager:
(Uruguay) José Santamaría

1	Getúlio
2	Miguel Ferreira
3	João Almeida
4	Jorge
5	Tião
6	José Dutra
7	Manoel Maria	(red card) 44'
8	China	(substituted off) 56'
9	Fernando Ferretti
10	Moreno
11	Toninho
Substitutions:
12	Raul Marcel
13	Cláudio Deodato
14	Plínio	(substituted on) 56'
15	Lauro de Mello
16	Fabio Mosquera
Manager:
(Brazil) Marão

Assistant referees:
George Lamptey (Ghana)
Wanchai Suvaree (Thailand)

=== Japan vs Nigeria ===
14 October 1968
15:30

Japan	3–1	Nigeria
Kamamoto 24', 72', 89'	Report	Garba 33'

Estadio Cuauhtémoc, Puebla
Referee: Ramón Mármol (El Salvador)

1	Kenzo Yokoyama
2	Hiroshi Katayama
3	Masakatsu Miyamoto
5	Mitsuo Kamata
8	Takaji Mori
9	Aritatsu Ogi
11	Shigeo Yaegashi	(substituted off) 78'
12	Teruki Miyamoto
15	Kunishige Kamamoto
16	Ikuo Matsumoto
17	Ryūichi Sugiyama
Substitutions:
18	Masahiro Hamazaki
4	Yoshitada Yamaguchi
6	Ryozo Suzuki
10	Eizo Yuguchi
14	Yasuyuki Kuwahara	(substituted on) 78'
Manager:
(Japan) Shunichiro Okano

1	Peter Fregene
2	Anthony Igwe
4	Sam Garba	Booked
5	Segun Olumodeji
6	Samuel Opone
8	Paul Hamilton		(substituted off) 38'
10	Peter Anieke
11	Mohammed Lawal
14	Sebastian Brodrick
15	Clement Obojememe
18	Joseph Aghoghovbia		(substituted off) 75'
Substitutions:
19	Yakubu Ibrahim
3	Augustine Ofuokwu
7	Muwiya Oshode
9	Kenneth Olayombo		(substituted on) 38'
16	Abdul Ganiyu Salami		(substituted on) 75'
Manager:
(Hungary) József Ember

Assistant referees:
Erwin Hieger (Austria)
Augusto Robles (Guatemala)

=== Spain vs Nigeria ===
16 October 1968
15:30

Spain	3–0	Nigeria
Ortuño 27'; Grande 52', 69'	Report

Estadio Azteca, Mexico City
Referee: Augusto Robles (Guatemala)

2	Pere Valentí Mora
3	Goyo Benito	Booked
4	Francisco Espíldora
6	Miguel Ángel Ochoa
7	Isidro Sala
8	Juan Manuel Asensi		(substituted off) 73'
11	Rafael Jaén
15	Juan Fernández		(substituted off) 66'
16	José Luis Garzón
17	Toni Grande
19	Fernando Ortuño
Substitutions:
1	Andrés Mendieta
5	José García
9	Javier Ciáurriz
13	Crispi		(substituted on) 73'
18	Gerardo Ortega		(substituted on) 66'
Manager:
(Uruguay) José Santamaría

1	Peter Fregene
2	Anthony Igwe
3	Augustine Ofuokwu
4	Sam Garba
5	Segun Olumodeji
6	Samuel Opone
10	Peter Anieke	Booked
11	Mohammed Lawal	Booked
14	Sebastian Brodrick
15	Clement Obojememe
16	Abdul Ganiyu Salami
Substitutions:
19	Yakubu Ibrahim
8	Paul Hamilton
9	Kenneth Olayombo
12	Durajaiyef Adigun
18	Joseph Aghoghovbia
Manager:
(Hungary) József Ember

Assistant referees:
Erwin Hieger (Austria)
Abraham Klein (Israel)

=== Brazil vs Japan ===
16 October 1968
15:30

Brazil	1–1	Japan
Ferretti 9'	Report	Watanabe 83'

Estadio Cuauhtémoc, Puebla
Referee: George Lamptey (Ghana)

1	Getúlio
2	Miguel Ferreira
3	João Almeida
5	Tião
6	José Dutra
9	Fernando Ferretti	(substituted off) 84'
10	Moreno
11	Toninho
13	Cláudio Deodato
14	Plínio
16	Fabio Mosquera
Substitutions:
12	Raul Marcel
4	Jorge
17	Arnaldo	(substituted on) 84'
18	Chance
Manager:
(Brazil) Marão

1	Kenzo Yokoyama
2	Hiroshi Katayama
4	Yoshitada Yamaguchi
5	Mitsuo Kamata
8	Takaji Mori
9	Aritatsu Ogi
12	Teruki Miyamoto
14	Yasuyuki Kuwahara	(substituted off) 45+1'
15	Kunishige Kamamoto
16	Ikuo Matsumoto	(substituted off) 81'
17	Ryūichi Sugiyama
Substitutions:
18	Masahiro Hamazaki
3	Masakatsu Miyamoto	(substituted on) 45+1'
6	Ryozo Suzuki
7	Kiyoshi Tomizawa
13	Masashi Watanabe	(substituted on) 81'
Manager:
(Japan) Shunichiro Okano

Assistant referees:
Seyoum Tarekegn (Ethiopia)
Dimitar Rumentchev (Bulgaria)

=== Spain vs Japan ===
18 October 1968
15:30

Spain	0–0	Japan
	Report

Estadio Azteca, Mexico City
Referee: Erwin Hieger (Austria)

1	Andrés Mendieta
3	Goyo Benito	Booked	(substituted off) 73'
4	Francisco Espíldora
6	Miguel Ángel Ochoa
9	Javier Ciáurriz
10	José María Igartua
12	Ramón Alfonseda
13	Crispi
14	José Antonio Barrios	Booked
17	Toni Grande
18	Gerardo Ortega
Substitutions:
2	Pere Valentí Mora
7	Isidro Sala		(substituted on) 73'
8	Juan Manuel Asensi
11	Rafael Jaén
16	José Luis Garzón
Manager:
(Uruguay) José Santamaría

1	Kenzo Yokoyama
2	Hiroshi Katayama
3	Masakatsu Miyamoto
4	Yoshitada Yamaguchi
5	Mitsuo Kamata
8	Takaji Mori
9	Aritatsu Ogi
12	Teruki Miyamoto	(substituted off) 73'
13	Masashi Watanabe
15	Kunishige Kamamoto
17	Ryūichi Sugiyama
Substitutions:
18	Masahiro Hamazaki
6	Ryozo Suzuki
10	Eizo Yuguchi
14	Yasuyuki Kuwahara
16	Ikuo Matsumoto
Manager:
(Japan) Shunichiro Okano

Assistant referees:
Milivoje Gugulović (Serbia)
István Zsolt (Hungary)

=== Brazil vs Nigeria ===
16 October 1968
15:30

Brazil	3–3	Nigeria
Ferretti 50'; Olumodeji 59' (o.g.); Tião 65'	Report	Olayombo 10', 41'; Anieke 19'

Estadio Cuauhtémoc, Puebla
Referee: George Lamptey (Ghana)

1	Getúlio
2	Miguel Ferreira
3	João Almeida	Booked	(substituted off) 45+1'
5	Tião
6	José Dutra
9	Fernando Ferretti	(red card) 55'
11	Toninho
13	Cláudio Deodato
14	Plínio
16	Fabio Mosquera
18	Chance
Substitutions:
12	Raul Marcel
4	Jorge
10	Moreno
17	Arnaldo		(substituted on) 45+1'
Manager:
(Brazil) Marão

1	Peter Fregene
2	Anthony Igwe
5	Segun Olumodeji		(substituted off) 75'
6	Samuel Opone
7	Muwiya Oshode		(substituted off) 80'
9	Kenneth Olayombo	Booked
10	Peter Anieke
11	Mohammed Lawal
14	Sebastian Brodrick
15	Clement Obojememe
17	Fred Aryee
Substitutions:
19	Yakubu Ibrahim
3	Augustine Ofuokwu	Booked	(substituted on) 75'
12	Durajaiyef Adigun
13	Willy Andrews
16	Abdul Ganiyu Salami		(substituted on) 80'
Manager:
(Hungary) József Ember

Assistant referees:
Abraham Klein (Israel)
Wanchai Suvareev (Thailand)

== See also ==
- Spain at the Olympics
- Japan at the Olympics
- Brazil at the Olympics
- Nigeria at the Olympics
