= Brazil at the 1968 Summer Olympics =

- IOC code: BRA
- NOC: Brazilian Olympic Committee

in Mexico City
- Competitors: 76 (73 men and 3 women) in 13 sports
- Flag bearer: João Gonçalves Filho
- Medals Ranked 35th: Gold 0 Silver 1 Bronze 2 Total 3

Summer Olympics appearances (overview)
- 1920; 1924; 1928; 1932; 1936; 1948; 1952; 1956; 1960; 1964; 1968; 1972; 1976; 1980; 1984; 1988; 1992; 1996; 2000; 2004; 2008; 2012; 2016; 2020; 2024; 2028

Brazil competed at the 1968 Summer Olympics in Mexico City, Mexico. 76 competitors, 73 men and 3 women, took part in 27 events in 13 sports. Brazilians won three medals at 1968 Summer Olympics. The bronze medal obtained by sailors Reinaldo Conrad and Burkhard Cordes and the bronze medal won by boxer Servílio de Oliveira were the first medals in their sports. Nelson Prudêncio obtained a silver medal and carried on the nation's tradition of good results in Men's Triple Jump.

== Medalists ==
Medal	Name	Sport	Event	Date
Silver	Nelson Prudêncio	Athletics	Men's triple jump	October 17
Bronze	Reinaldo Conrad; Burkhard Cordes	Sailing	Flying Dutchman	October 21
Bronze	Servílio de Oliveira	Boxing	Men's Flyweight	October 24

Medals by sport
Sport	1st place, gold medalist(s)	2nd place, silver medalist(s)	3rd place, bronze medalist(s)	Total
Athletics	0	1	0	1
Sailing	0	0	1	1
Boxing	0	0	1	1
Total	0	1	2	3

Medals by gender
Gender	1st place, gold medalist(s)	2nd place, silver medalist(s)	3rd place, bronze medalist(s)	Total
Male	0	1	2	3
Female	0	0	0	0
Mixed	0	0	0	0
Total	0	1	2	3

== Athletics ==
Men
Field events

Athlete	Event	Qualification		Final	
Athlete	Event	Distance	Position	Distance	Position
Nelson Prudêncio	Triple jump	16.46	4 Q	17.27	2nd place, silver medalist(s)

Women
Field events

Athlete	Event	Qualification		Final	
Athlete	Event	Distance	Position	Distance	Position
Maria Cipriano	High jump	1.74	9 Q	1.71	11

Combined events – Pentathlon

Athlete	Event	80H	SP	HJ	LJ	200 m	Final	Rank
Aída dos Santos	Result	11.6	12.41	1.59	5.50	24.9	4578	20
Aída dos Santos	Points	948	882	934	873	941	4578	20

== Basketball ==
=== Preliminary round ===
==== Group B ====
Qualified for the semifinals

Team	W	L	PF	PA	PD	Pts
Soviet Union	7	0	642	408	+234	14
Brazil	6	1	561	418	+143	13
Mexico	5	2	493	443	+50	12
Poland	4	3	473	504	−31	11
Bulgaria	3	4	456	478	−22	10
Cuba	2	5	514	532	−18	9
South Korea	1	6	453	530	−77	8
Morocco	0	7	355	634	−279	7

13.10.1968

Brazil	98–52	Morocco

Palacio de los Deportes, Mexico City

14.10.1968

Brazil	75–59	Bulgaria

Palacio de los Deportes, Mexico City

15.10.1968

Mexico	53–60	Brazil

Palacio de los Deportes, Mexico City

16.10.1968

Poland	51–88	Brazil

Palacio de los Deportes, Mexico City

18.10.1968

South Korea	59–91	Brazil

Palacio de los Deportes, Mexico City

19.10.1968

Cuba	68–84	Brazil

Palacio de los Deportes, Mexico City

20.10.1968

Soviet Union	76–65	Brazil

Palacio de los Deportes, Mexico City

=== Semifinal ===
22.10.1968

Brazil	63–75	United States

Palacio de los Deportes, Mexico City

=== Bronze medal ===
25.10.1968

Soviet Union	70–53	Brazil

Palacio de los Deportes, Mexico City

== Boxing ==
Men

Athlete	Event	1 Round	2 Round	3 Round	Quarterfinals	Semifinals	Final	
Athlete	Event	Opposition Result	Opposition Result	Opposition Result	Opposition Result	Opposition Result	Opposition Result	Rank
Servilio de Oliveira	Flyweight	BYE		Engin Yadigar (TUR); W 3-2	Joseph Destimo (GHA); W 5-0	Ricardo Delgado (MEX); L 0-5	did not advance	3rd place, bronze medalist(s)
Expedito Alencar	Welterweight	BYE	Tadesse Gebregiorgis (ETH); W RSC-1	Manfred Wolke (GDR); L 0-5	did not advance			

== Equestrian ==
=== Show jumping ===
Athlete	Horse	Event	Round 1		Round 2		Final		
Athlete	Horse	Event	Penalties	Rank	Penalties	Rank	Total	Jump-off	Rank
Lucia Faria	Rush du Camp	Individual	7,25	8 Q	19,25	12	19,25	—N/a	12
Jose Fernandez	Cantal	Individual	23,25	33	did not advance				
Nelson Pessoa Filho	Pass Op	Individual	8,00	9 Q	24,00	16	24,00	—N/a	16
Lucia Faria; Jose Fernandez; Nelson Pessoa Filho	See above	Team	138,00	7	—N/a				7

== Fencing ==
Four fencers, all men, represented Brazil in 1968.

Men

Ranks given are within the pool.

Fencer	Event	Round 1		Round 2		Elimination round I	Elimination round II	Repechage round I	Repechage round II	Repechage Final	Final
Fencer	Event	Result	Rank	Result	Rank	Opposition Result	Opposition Result	Opposition Result	Opposition Result	Result	Rank
Darío Amaral	Men's épée	1-4	6	did not advance							
Carlos Couto	Men's épée	3-2	4 Q	4-2	2 Q	Polzhuber (AUT)	did not advance				
Arthur Ribeiro	Men's épée	2-3	5	did not advance							
Arthur Ribeiro; Darío Amaral; José Maria Pereira; Carlos Couto	Team epee	Italy; L 2-14; Great Britain; L 6-8	3	did not advance							

== Football ==
=== First round ===
==== Group B ====
Team	Pld	W	D	L	GF	GA	GD	Pts
Spain	3	2	1	0	4	0	+4	5
Japan	3	1	2	0	4	2	+2	4
Brazil	3	0	2	1	4	5	−1	2
Nigeria	3	0	1	2	4	9	−5	1

1968-10-14
12:00

Spain	1 – 0	Brazil
Fernández 77'	Report

Azteca Stadium, Mexico City
Referee: Abraham Klein (Israel)

1968-10-16
12:00

Brazil	1 – 1	Japan
Ferretti 9'	Report	Watanabe 83'

Estadio Cuauhtémoc, Puebla
Referee: George Lamptey (Ghana)

1968-10-18
12:00

Brazil	3 – 3	Nigeria
Ferretti 50'; Olumodeji 59' (o.g.); Tião 65'	Report	Olayombo 10' 41'; Anieke 19'

Estadio Cuauhtémoc, Puebla
Referee: Seyoum Tarekegn (Ethiopia)

== Rowing ==
Men

Athlete	Event	Heats		Repechage		Semifinals		Final	
Athlete	Event	Time	Rank	Time	Rank	Time	Rank	Time	Rank
Harri Klein; Edgard Gijsen	Double scull	7:16.70	5 R	NT	2 Q	7:17.08	5	Did not advance	

== Sailing ==
Open

Athlete	Event	Race														Final rank	
Athlete	Event	1		2		3		4		5		6		7		Final rank	
Athlete	Event	Score	Rank	Score	Rank	Score	Rank	Score	Rank	Score	Rank	Score	Rank	Score	Rank	Score	Rank
Jörg Bruder	Finn	7	13	4	8	~~DNF~~	~~42~~	12	18	14	20	12	18	7	13	90	9
Reinaldo Conrad; Burkhard Cordes	Flying Dutchman	~~14~~	~~20~~	7	13	4	8	3	5.7	3	5.7	10	16	1	0	48.4	3rd place, bronze medalist(s)
Erik Schmidt; Axel Schmidt	Star	~~18~~	~~24~~	8	14	17	23	17	23	3	5.7	2	3	3	5.7	74.4	7

== Shooting ==
Two male shooters represented Brazil in 1968.

Men

Athlete	Event	Final	
Athlete	Event	Score	Rank
Durval Guimarães	50 m pistol	524	55
Durval Guimarães	50 m rifle, prone	589	39
Edmar de Salles	50 m rifle, three positions	1077	55
Edmar de Salles	50 m rifle, prone	590	34

== Swimming ==
Men

Athlete	Event	Heat		Semifinal		Final	
Athlete	Event	Time	Rank	Time	Rank	Time	Rank
José Aranha	100 m freestyle	56.8	37	did not advance			
César Filardi	100 m backstroke	1:04.6	=22	did not advance			
José Fiolo	100 m breaststroke	1:09.5	=7 Q	1:08.6	4 Q	1:08.1	4
José Fiolo	200 m breaststroke	2:42.1	26	—N/a		did not advance	
João Lima Neto	100 m butterfly	1:02.3	=36	did not advance			
César Filardi; José Fiolo; João Lima Neto; José Aranha	4 × 100 m medley relay	4:11.1	14	—N/a		did not advance	

== Volleyball ==
=== Men's team competition ===
Pos	Team	Pld	W	L	Pts	SW	SL	SR	SPW	SPL	SPR
1	Soviet Union	9	8	1	17	26	8	3.250	464	326	1.423
2	Japan	9	7	2	16	24	6	4.000	430	258	1.667
3	Czechoslovakia	9	7	2	16	22	15	1.467	454	417	1.089
4	East Germany	9	6	3	15	22	12	1.833	449	374	1.201
5	Poland	9	6	3	15	18	11	1.636	371	281	1.320
6	Bulgaria	9	4	5	13	16	17	0.941	379	385	0.984
7	United States	9	4	5	13	15	18	0.833	383	414	0.925
8	Belgium	9	2	7	11	6	24	0.250	239	417	0.573
9	Brazil	9	1	8	10	8	25	0.320	357	469	0.761
10	Mexico	9	0	9	9	6	27	0.222	289	474	0.610

Date		Score		Set 1	Set 2	Set 3	Set 4	Set 5	Total
13 Oct	Belgium	3–1	Brazil	15–7	16–14	9–15	15–6		55–42
16 Oct	Soviet Union	3–1	Brazil	11–15	15–2	15–9	15–9		56–35
17 Oct	United States	3–0	Brazil	15–12	15–7	15–10			45–29
19 Oct	Czechoslovakia	3–2	Brazil	15–12	15–10	13–15	13–15	15–9	71–61
20 Oct	Bulgaria	3–0	Brazil	15–8	18–16	15–3			48–27
21 Oct	Poland	3–0	Brazil	15–12	15–4	15–7			45–23
23 Oct	East Germany	3–1	Brazil	15–13	15–7	14–16	15–12		59–48
24 Oct	Japan	3–0	Brazil	15–8	15–11	15–12			45–31
25 Oct	Brazil	3–1	Mexico	14–16	15–6	17–15	15–8		61–45

== Water polo ==
=== Preliminary round ===
==== Group A ====
	Team	Points	G	W	D	L	GF	GA	Diff
1.	Hungary	12	6	6	0	0	39	14	+25
2.	Soviet Union	10	6	5	0	1	43	18	+25
3.	United States	7	6	3	1	2	37	36	+1
4.	Cuba	7	6	3	1	2	31	35	–4
5.	West Germany	4	6	2	0	4	33	34	–1
6.	Spain	1	6	0	1	5	20	37	–17
7.	Brazil	1	6	0	1	5	22	51	–29

- 14 October 1968

United States	10 – 5	Brazil

- 15 October 1968

Cuba	9 – 2	Brazil

- 19 October 1968

West Germany	10 – 5	Brazil

- 20 October 1968

Spain	6 – 6	Brazil

- 21 October 1968

Hungary	8 – 2	Brazil

- 22 October 1968

Soviet Union	8 – 2	Brazil

== Weightlifting ==
Men

Athlete	Event	Military Press		Snatch		Clean & Jerk		Total	Rank
Athlete	Event	Result	Rank	Result	Rank	Result	Rank	Total	Rank
Luiz de Almeida	75 kg	137.5	8	115.0	15	155.0	15	407.5	13
