= 1970 FIFA World Cup qualification (CAF) =

Tournament details
- Dates: October 27th 1968 - November 8th 1969
- Teams: 11 (from 1 confederation)

Tournament statistics
- Matches played: 24
- Goals scored: 69 (2.88 per match)
- Attendance: 446,751 (18,615 per match)
- Top scorer: (Nigeria) Sam Garba (5 Goals)

The Confederation of African Football (CAF) section of the 1970 FIFA World Cup qualification saw teams competing for one berth in the final tournament in Mexico.

Thirteen nations in total entered the qualifying stage but FIFA rejected the entries of Guinea and Zaire, leaving 11 nations to contest the qualifying spot.

This was the first World Cup to have a guaranteed place for an African team, a place which went to Morocco.

== Format ==
There would be three rounds of play:

- First Round: Ten teams were paired up to play knockout matches on a home-and-away basis, with one team receiving a bye to the Second Round. The winners (determined by aggregate score) would advance to the Second Round.
- Second Round: The six teams were paired up to play knockout matches on a home-and-away basis. The winners would advance to the Final Round.
- Final Round: The three remaining teams played against each other on a home-and-away basis. The group winner would qualify. In June 1969, FIFA announced that Morocco had suggested that the final round be played as a single round-robin at a neutral venue, but that Sudan would not agree to this change of the format.

In the event of a tie, extra time would be played, and whichever team had scored more goals in the second leg would progress. If both games were drawn, or if extra time were not played, then a playoff on neutral ground would decide the fixture. If the playoff was a draw after extra time, a coin toss would be made to decide the winner.

== Entrants ==
- Algeria
- Cameroon
- Ethiopia
- Ghana
- Libya
- Morocco
- Nigeria
- Senegal
- Sudan
- Tunisia
- Zambia

== Qualification ==
=== First round ===
Team 1	Agg.	Team 2	1st leg	2nd leg	3rd leg
Zambia	6–6	Sudan	4–2	2–4 (aet)	
Morocco	4–2	Senegal	1–0	1–2	2–0
Algeria	1–2	Tunisia	1–2	0–0	
Nigeria	4–3	Cameroon	1–1	3–2	
Libya	3–5	Ethiopia	2–0	1–5	
Ghana	Bye		—	—	—

27 October 1968

Zambia	4–2	Sudan
Mwila 34'; Chitalu 47', 85'; Kapengwe 65'		Osman Santo 16', 42'

Dag Hammarskjöld Stadium, Ndola
Attendance: 11,714
Referee: Philippe Mutombo (Zaire)
8 November 1968

Sudan	4–2 (a.e.t.)	Zambia
Abdel Kafi El-Sheikh 38'; Ismaeil Bakhit 76', 81'; Osman Santo 114'		Chitalu 22'; Kapengwe 96'

Khartoum Stadium, Khartoum
Attendance: 17,083
Referee: Ali Kandil (United Arab Republic)

The aggregate score was tied 6–6, but Sudan advanced to the Second Round as they scored more goals in the second match.

3 November 1968

Morocco	1–0	Senegal
Benkhrif 72'

Stade d'Honneur, Casablanca
Attendance: 22,582
Referee: José María Ortiz de Mendíbil (Spain)
5 January 1969

Senegal	2–1	Morocco
Diéme 26'; Diop 32'		Akesbi 14'

Stade Demba Diop, Dakar
Attendance: 11,487
Referee: Mamadou Mabel Ba Diarra (Mali)

The aggregate score was tied 2–2, and since extra time was not played in the second match, a play-off on neutral ground was played to decide who would advance to the Second Round.

13 February 1969

Morocco	2–0	Senegal
Bamous 54'; Hafnaoui 60'

Estadio Union Deportivo, Las Palmas, Canary Islands
Attendance: 7,924
Referee: Gaspar Pintado Viu (Spain)

Morocco advanced to the Second Round, via the play-off.

17 November 1968

Algeria	1–2	Tunisia
Amirouche 29' (pen.)		Chakroun 72', 80'

El-Annasser Stadium, Algiers
Attendance: 13,419
Referee: Roger Barde (France)
29 December 1968

Tunisia	0–0	Algeria

Stade El Menzah, Tunis
Attendance: 36,814
Referee: Fabio Monti (Italy)

Tunisia advanced to the Second Round.

7 December 1968

Nigeria	1–1	Cameroon
Aghoghovbia 47'		Owona 69'

Surulere Stadium, Lagos
Attendance: 87,201
Referee: Philip Robinson (Liberia)
22 December 1968

Cameroon	2–3	Nigeria
Ayo (?); Bassanguen (?)		Ofuokwu (?); Anieke (?); Oshode (?)

Stade Akwa, Douala
Attendance: 6,988
Referee: Joseph Blanchard Angaud (Congo)

Nigeria advanced to the Second Round.

26 January 1969

Libya	2–0	Ethiopia
Al-Jahani 22'; Koussa 49'

11 June Stadium, Tripoli
Attendance: 5,687
Referee: Mohamed Diab Al-Attar (United Arab Republic)
9 February 1969

Ethiopia	5–1	Libya
Germa 1', 85'; Feseha 11'; Geremew 77', 84'		Ben Soed (?)

Haile Selassie Stadium, Addis Ababa
Attendance: 6,759
Referee: Ahmed El-Kholy (United Arab Republic)

Ethiopia advanced to the Second Round.

=== Second round ===
Team 1	Agg.	Team 2	1st leg	2nd leg	3rd leg
Tunisia	2–2	Morocco	0–0	0–0 (aet)	2–2 (aet)
Ethiopia	2–4	Sudan	1–1	1–3	
Nigeria	3–2	Ghana	2–1	1–1	

27 April 1969

Tunisia	0–0	Morocco

Stade El Menzah, Tunis
Attendance: 26,706
Referee: Michel Kitabdjian (France)
18 May 1969

Morocco	0–0 (a.e.t.)	Tunisia

Stade Mohammed V, Casablanca
Attendance: 9,781
Referee: Juan Gardeazábal Garay (Spain)

The aggregate score was tied 0–0, and as both legs were drawn, a play-off on neutral ground was played to decide who would advance to the Final Round.

13 June 1969

Morocco	2–2 (a.e.t.)	Tunisia
Khanousi 27'; Jarir 53'		Chaïbi 3'; Cheman 87'

Stade Municipal, Marseille, France
Attendance: 4,185
Referee: Michel Kitabdjian (France)

Morocco advanced to the Final Round, by winning a coin toss.

4 May 1969

Ethiopia	1–1	Sudan
Mengistu 79'		Hasabu El Sagheir 9'

Haile Selassie Stadium, Addis Ababa
Attendance: 9,015
Referee: Mohamed Touati (Tunisia)
11 May 1969

Sudan	3–1	Ethiopia
Gagarin 20', 60'; Jagdoul 80'		Asfaw 65'

Khartoum Stadium, Khartoum
Attendance: 22,373
Referee: Ali Kandil (United Arab Republic)

Sudan advanced to the Final Round.

10 May 1969

Nigeria	2–1	Ghana
Imasuen 62'; Oshode 64'		Ankrah 18'

Liberty Stadium, Ibadan
Attendance: 25,118
Referee: Youssou N'Diaye (Senegal)
18 May 1969

Ghana	1–1	Nigeria
Ola 41'		Garba 19'

Accra Sports Stadium, Accra
Attendance: 22,386
Referee: Tiedro Cy-Nahounou (Ivory Coast)

Nigeria advanced to the Final Round.

=== Final Round ===
Rank	Team	Pts	Pld	W	D	L	GF	GA	GD
1	Morocco	5	4	2	1	1	5	3	+2
2	Nigeria	4	4	1	2	1	8	7	+1
3	Sudan	3	4	0	3	1	5	8	−3

13 September 1969

Nigeria	2–2	Sudan
Garba 33', 43'		Abbas 7'; Jadallah Kheirelseid 30'

Liberty Stadium, Ibadan
Attendance: 20,651
Referee: Ourabah Mohandi (Algeria)

21 September 1969

Morocco	2–1	Nigeria
El Filali 50'; Faras 63'		Lawal 53'

Stade Mohammed V, Casablanca
Attendance: 3,600
Referee: Roger Mâchin (France)

3 October 1969

Sudan	3–3	Nigeria
Abbas 33'; Awad Koka 70'; Bushra Wahba 84'		Garba 49'; Ineh 55'; Opone 72'

Khartoum Stadium, Khartoum
Attendance: 26,502
Referee: Aurelio Angonese (Italy)

10 October 1969

Sudan	0–0	Morocco

Khartoum Stadium, Khartoum
Attendance: 18,020
Referee: Ali Kandil (United Arab Republic)

26 October 1969

Morocco	3–0	Sudan
El Filali 41'; Jarir 76', 86'

Stade Mohammed V, Casablanca
Attendance: 19,600
Referee: Major George Lamptey (Ghana)

8 November 1969

Nigeria	2–0	Morocco
Lawal 67' (pen.); Garba 82'

Liberty Stadium, Ibadan
Attendance: 11,156
Referee: Seyoum Tarekegn (Ethiopia)

Morocco qualified.

== Qualified teams ==
Team	Qualified as	Qualified on	Previous appearances in FIFA World Cup^{1}
Morocco	Final round winners	26 October 1969	0 (debut)

^{1} Bold indicates champions for that year. Italic indicates hosts for that year.

== Goalscorers ==
5 goals

- (Nigeria) Sam Garba

3 goals

- (Morocco) Houmane Jarir
- (Zambia) Emment Kapengwe
- (Sudan) Babiker Santo

2 goals

- (Ethiopia) Zerga Geremew
- (Ethiopia) Asmeron Germa
- (Morocco) Mohammed El Filali
- (Nigeria) Mohammed Lawal
- (Nigeria) Olumuyiwa Oshode
- (Sudan) Nasr El-Din Abbas
- (Sudan) Ismaeil Bakhit
- (Sudan) Ali Gagarin
- (Tunisia) Ezzedine Chakroun

1 goal

- (Algeria) Boualem Amirouche
- (Cameroon) David Ayo
- (Cameroon) Dieudonné Bassanguen
- (Cameroon) Norbert Owona
- (Ethiopia) Kebede Asfaw
- (Ethiopia) Emmanuel Feseha
- (Ethiopia) Mengistu Worku
- (Ghana) Abekah Ankrah
- (Ghana) Emmanuel Ola
- (Libya) Mahmoud Al-Jahani
- (Libya) Ahmed Ben Soed
- (Libya) Mohamed Koussa
- (Morocco) Hassan Akesbi
- (Morocco) Driss Bamous
- (Morocco) Boujemaa Benkhrif
- (Morocco) Ahmed Faras
- (Morocco) Cherkaoui Hafnaoui
- (Morocco) Moulay Khanousi
- (Nigeria) Joseph Aghoghovbia
- (Nigeria) Peter Anieke
- (Nigeria) Sebastian Broderick Imasuen
- (Nigeria) Sunday Ineh
- (Nigeria) Augustine Ofuokwu
- (Nigeria) Samuel Opone
- (Senegal) Emile Pierre Diéme
- (Senegal) Abdoulaye Makhtar Diop
- (Sudan) Jadallah Kheirelseid
- (Sudan) Hasabu El Sagheir
- (Sudan) Abdelkfi Elsheikh
- (Sudan) Jagdoul
- (Sudan) Awad Koka
- (Sudan) Bushra Wahba
- (Tunisia) Tahar Chaïbi
- (Tunisia) Abdesselem Cheman
- (Zambia) Godfrey Chitalu
- (Zambia) Sandy Kaposa
- (Zambia) Dickson Makwaza
