= Nigeria at the 1968 Summer Olympics =

- IOC code: NGR
- NOC: Nigeria Olympic Committee

in Mexico City
- Medals: Gold 0 Silver 0 Bronze 0 Total 0

Summer Olympics appearances (overview)
- 1952; 1956; 1960; 1964; 1968; 1972; 1976; 1980; 1984; 1988; 1992; 1996; 2000; 2004; 2008; 2012; 2016; 2020; 2024

Nigeria competed at the 1968 Summer Olympics in Mexico City, Mexico.

== Results by event ==
=== Boxing ===
Men's Light Flyweight (– 48 kg)

- Gabriel Ogun

- First Round — Bye
- Second Round — Defeated Stefan Alexandrov (BUL), 4:1
- Quarterfinals — Lost to Harlan Marbley (USA), 0:5

Men's Light Heavyweight (– 81 kg)

- Fatai Ayinla

- First Round — Bye
- Second Round — Defeated Enrique Villarreal (MEX), referee stopped contest
- Quarterfinals — Lost to Ion Monea (ROU), 2:3

=== Football ===
Group B

Team	Pld	W	D	L	GF	GA	GD	Pts
Spain	3	2	1	0	4	0	+4	5
Japan	3	1	2	0	4	2	+2	4
Brazil	3	0	2	1	4	5	−1	2
Nigeria	3	0	1	2	4	9	−5	1

1968-10-14
12:00

Japan	3 – 1	Nigeria
Kamamoto 24' 72' 89'	Report	Okoye 33'

Estadio Cuauhtémoc, Puebla
Referee: Ramon Sagastume Marmol (El Salvador)

1968-10-16
12:00

Spain	3 – 0	Nigeria
Ortuño 27'; Grande 52' 69'	Report

Azteca Stadium, Mexico City
Referee: Augusto Robles (Guatemala)

1968-10-18
12:00

Brazil	3 – 3	Nigeria
Ferreti 50'; Olumodeji 59' (o.g.); Tião 65'	Report	Olayombo 10' 41'; Anieke 19'

Estadio Cuauhtémoc, Puebla
Referee: Seyoum Tarekegn (Ethiopia)
