= Boxing at the 1968 Summer Olympics – Flyweight =

Boxing competitions

The Flyweight class in the boxing competition was the second-lowest weight class. Flyweights were limited to those boxers weighing a maximum of 51 kilograms (112.4 lbs). 26 boxers qualified for this category. Like all Olympic boxing events, the competition was a straight single-elimination tournament. Both semifinal losers were awarded bronze medals, so no boxers competed again after their first loss. Bouts consisted of six rounds each. Five judges scored each bout.

== Medalists ==
Gold	Ricardo Delgado; Mexico
Silver	Artur Olech; Poland
Bronze	Servílio de Oliveira; Brazil
Bronze	Leo Rwabwogo; Uganda

== Schedule ==
Date	Round
Monday, October 14, 1968	First round
Thursday, October 17, 1968	Second round
Monday, October 21, 1968	Quarterfinals
Thursday, October 24, 1968	Semifinals
Saturday, October 26, 1968	Final Bout

== Draw ==
Round of 32
Tito Pereyra (ARG)	4
Robert Carney (AUS)	1
Tetsuaki Nakamura (JPN)	4
Johnny McGonigle (GBR)	1
Constantin Ciuca (ROU)	4
Boujemaa Hilmann (MAR)	1
Artur Olech (POL)
Heriberto Cintrón (PUR)	DSQ ^{1}
Kenny Mwansa (ZAM)	4
Rodolfo Díaz (PHI)	1
Nikolay Novikov (URS)	5
Félix Márquez (VEN)	0
David Vasquez (USA)	3
Filippo Grasso (ITA)	2
Leo Rwabwogo (UGA)	5
Seo Sang-yeong (KOR)	0
Tibor Badari (HUN)	4
Orlando Martínez (CUB)	1
Prapan Duangchaoom (THA)	5
Chan Wa-yen (TPE)	0

Round of 16
Joseph Destimo (GHA)	RSC
Walter Henry (CAN)
Servílio de Oliveira (BRA)	3
Engin Yadigar (TUR)	2
Ricardo Delgado (MEX)	5
Brendan McCarthy (IRL)	0
Tito Pereyra (ARG)	0
Tetsuaki Nakamura (JPN)	5
Constantin Ciuca (ROU)	2
Artur Olech (POL)	3
Kenny Mwansa (ZAM)	1
Nicolai Novikov (URS)	4
David Vásquez (USA)	2
Leo Rwabwogo (UGA)	3
Tibor Badari (HUN)	4
Prapan Duangcha-Oom (THA)	1

Quarterfinals
Joseph Destimo (GHA)	0
Servílio de Oliveira (BRA)	5
Ricardo Delgado (MEX)	5
Tetsuaki Nakamura (JPN)	0
Artur Olech (POL)	RSC
Nicolai Novikov (URS)
Leo Rwabwogo (UGA)	3
Tibor Badari (HUN)	2

Semifinals
Servílio de Oliveira (BRA)	0
Ricardo Delgado (MEX)	5
Artur Olech (POL)	4
Leo Rwabwogo (UGA)	2

Final
Ricardo Delgado (MEX)	5
Artur Olech (POL)	0

^{1} Cintrón was ejected from the competition after officials discovered he was underage on the morning of the first round.
