= Results of the 2011 Tunisian Constituent Assembly election =

The breakdown of the result of the 2011 Tunisian Constituent Assembly election is as follows:

== Overall ==
| Party | Votes | % | Seats |
|---|---|---|---|
| Ennahda Movement | 1,498,905 | 36.97 | 89 |
| Congress for the Republic | 352,825 | 8.70 | 29 |
| Democratic Forum for Labour and Liberties | 285,530 | 7.04 | 20 |
| Popular Petition | 280,382 | 6.92 | 26 |
| Progressive Democratic Party | 160,692 | 3.96 | 16 |
| National Destourian Initiative | 129,215 | 3.19 | 5 |
| Democratic Modernist Pole | 113,094 | 2.79 | 5 |
| Afek Tounes | 76,643 | 1.89 | 4 |
| Tunisian Workers' Communist Party | 60,620 | 1.50 | 3 |
| Free Patriotic Union | 51,594 | 1.27 | 1 |
| Democratic Patriots' Movement | 32,306 | 0.80 | 1 |
| People's Movement | 31,793 | 0.78 | 2 |
| Movement of Socialist Democrats | 22,842 | 0.56 | 2 |
| Voice of the Future | 17,340 | 0.43 | 1 |
| Democratic Social Nation Party | 15,572 | 0.38 | 1 |
| New Destour Party | 15,459 | 0.38 | 1 |
| Maghrebin Liberal Party | 13,053 | 0.32 | 1 |
| The Independent | 12,172 | 0.30 | 1 |
| Fulfilment | 11,578 | 0.29 | 1 |
| The Hope | 10,681 | 0.26 | 1 |
| For a Tunisian National Front | 9,923 | 0.24 | 1 |
| Progressive Struggle Party | 9,329 | 0.23 | 1 |
| Justice | 9,221 | 0.23 | 1 |
| Equality and Justice Party | 7,619 | 0.19 | 1 |
| Social Struggle | 6,680 | 0.16 | 1 |
| Cultural Unionist Nation Party | 5,581 | 0.14 | 1 |
| Faith to the Martyrs | 3,869 | 0.10 | 1 |
| Other parties | 809,387 | 19.97 | 0 |
| Total | 4,053,905 | 100.00 | 217 |
| Valid votes | 4,053,905 | 94.13 | |
| Invalid/blank votes | 252,630 | 5.87 | |
| Total votes | 4,306,535 | 100.00 | |
| Registered voters/turnout | 8,715,520 | 49.41 | |
Source: ISIE

== Vote and seat summaries ==
Popular vote
| Ennahda | 37.0% |
| CPR | 8.4% |
| Aridha | 6.2% |
| Ettakatol | 6.1% |
| PDP | 2.7% |
| Others | 39.6% |

Seat totals
| Ennahda | 41.0% |
| CPR | 13.4% |
| Aridha | 12.0% |
| Ettakatol | 9.2% |
| PDP | 7.4% |
| Others | 17.1% |

== By constituency ==
=== Summary ===
| Party | Ar | Bé | BA | Bi | Gb | Gf | Je | Ka | Ks | Kb | Kf | Mh | Mn | Md | Mo | N1 | N2 | S1 | S2 | SB | Si | So | Ta | To | T1 | T2 | Za | F1 | F2 | Ge | It | E–A | A–W | Total |
|---|---|---|---|---|---|---|---|---|---|---|---|---|---|---|---|---|---|---|---|---|---|---|---|---|---|---|---|---|---|---|---|---|---|---|
| Nahda | 3 | 2 | 4 | 4 | 4 | 3 | 2 | 4 | 3 | 2 | 2 | 3 | 3 | 5 | 3 | 2 | 2 | 3 | 4 | 2 | 2 | 4 | 3 | 2 | 4 | 3 | 2 | 2 | 2 | 1 | 2 | 1 | 1 | 89 |
| CPR | 1 | 1 | 1 | 1 | 1 | 1 | 1 | 1 | 1 | 2 | 1 | 1 | 1 | 1 | 1 | 1 | 1 | 1 | 1 | - | - | 1 | - | 1 | 1 | 1 | 1 | 1 | 1 | - | - | 1 | 1 | 29 |
| Aridha Chaabia | - | 1 | - | 1 | 1 | 1 | 1 | 2 | 1 | 1 | 1 | 1 | 1 | 1 | 1 | 1 | 1 | 1 | 1 | 3 | 1 | 1 | 1 | - | - | - | 1 | - | x | - | 1 | - | - | 26 |
| Ettakatol | 1 | 1 | 2 | 1 | - | - | 1 | 1 | - | - | 1 | - | 1 | - | 1 | 1 | 1 | 1 | 1 | - | - | 1 | - | - | 1 | 2 | - | 1 | 1 | - | - | - | - | 20 |
| PDP | 1 | 1 | 1 | 1 | - | 1 | 1 | - | 1 | - | - | - | - | 1 | - | 1 | 1 | - | - | - | 1 | 1 | - | - | 1 | 1 | 1 | - | 1 | - | - | - | - | 16 |
| Initiative | - | - | - | - | - | - | - | - | - | - | - | 1 | - | - | 2 | - | - | - | - | - | - | 2 | - | - | - | - | - | - | - | - | - | - | - | 5 |
| PDM | 1 | - | 1 | - | - | - | - | - | - | - | - | - | - | - | - | - | - | - | - | - | - | - | - | - | 1 | 1 | - | 1 | - | - | - | - | - | 5 |
| Afek | - | - | - | - | - | - | - | - | - | - | - | 1 | - | 1 | - | 1 | - | - | 1 | - | - | - | - | - | - | - | - | - | - | - | - | - | - | 4 |
| PCOT | - | - | - | - | - | - | - | 1 | - | - | - | - | - | - | - | - | - | 1 | - | - | 1 | - | - | - | - | - | - | - | - | - | - | - | - | 3 |
| MP | - | - | - | 1 | - | - | - | - | - | - | - | - | - | - | - | - | - | - | - | 1 | - | - | - | - | - | - | - | - | - | - | - | - | - | 2 |
| MDS | - | - | - | - | - | - | - | - | 1 | - | - | - | - | - | - | - | - | - | - | 1 | - | - | - | - | - | - | - | - | - | - | - | - | - | 2 |
| PLM | 1 | - | - | - | - | - | - | - | - | - | - | - | - | - | - | - | - | - | - | - | - | - | - | - | - | - | - | - | - | - | - | - | - | 1 |
| PEE | - | - | - | - | - | - | - | - | - | - | - | 1 | - | - | - | - | - | - | - | - | - | - | - | - | - | - | - | - | - | - | - | - | - | 1 |
| PLP | - | - | - | - | - | - | - | - | - | - | - | - | - | - | - | - | - | - | - | - | - | - | - | - | 1 | - | - | - | - | - | - | - | - | 1 |
| PND | - | - | - | - | - | - | - | - | - | - | - | - | 1 | - | - | - | - | - | - | - | - | - | - | - | - | - | - | - | - | - | - | - | - | 1 |
| PNDS | - | - | 1 | - | - | - | - | - | - | - | - | - | - | - | - | - | - | - | - | - | - | - | - | - | - | - | - | - | - | - | - | - | - | 1 |
| PNCU | - | - | - | - | - | - | - | - | - | - | - | - | - | - | 1 | - | - | - | - | - | - | - | - | - | - | - | - | - | - | - | - | - | - | 1 |
| UPL | - | - | - | - | - | - | - | - | - | - | - | - | - | - | - | - | - | - | - | - | 1 | - | - | - | - | - | - | - | - | - | - | - | - | 1 |
| MOUPAD | - | - | - | - | - | - | 1 | - | - | - | - | - | - | - | - | - | - | - | - | - | - | - | - | - | - | - | - | - | - | - | - | - | - | 1 |
| Independents | - | - | - | - | 1 | 1 | 1 | - | 1 | - | 1 | - | - | - | - | - | - | - | 1 | 1 | - | - | - | 1 | - | - | - | - | - | - | - | - | - | 8 |
| Total | 8 | 6 | 10 | 9 | 7 | 7 | 8 | 9 | 8 | 5 | 6 | 8 | 7 | 9 | 9 | 7 | 6 | 7 | 9 | 8 | 6 | 10 | 4 | 4 | 9 | 8 | 5 | 5 | 5 | 1 | 3 | 2 | 2 | 217 |
Source: Tunisia-Live.net

=== Greater Tunis ===
Election results: Ariana
| Parties | Votes | % | Seats |
|---|---|---|---|
| Ennahda Movement | 71,170 | 35.39 | 3 |
| Democratic Forum for Labour and Liberties | 27,570 | 13.71 | 1 |
| Congress for the Republic (CPR) | 17,791 | 8.85 | 1 |
| Progressive Democratic Party | 13,791 | 6.86 | 1 |
| Democratic Modernist Pole | 9,869 | 4.91 | 1 |
| Maghrebin Liberal Party | 6,621 | 3.29 | 1 |
| Total | 201,074 | 100.00 | 8 |
Source: ISIE.tn

Election results: Ben Arous
| Parties | Votes | % | Seats |
|---|---|---|---|
| Ennahda Movement | 98,216 | 41.53 | 4 |
| Democratic Forum for Labour and Liberties | 29,819 | 12.61 | 2 |
| Congress for the Republic | 25,674 | 10.86 | 1 |
| Progressive Democratic Party | 11,127 | 4.71 | 1 |
| Democratic Modernist Pole | 6,195 | 2.62 | 1 |
| Social-Democratic Nation Party | 5,643 | 2.39 | 1 |
| Total | 236,490 | 100.00 | 10 |
Source: ISIE.tn

Election results: Manouba
| Parties | Votes | % | Seats |
|---|---|---|---|
| Ennahda Movement | 53,547 | 39.41 | 3 |
| Congress for the Republic | 12,286 | 9.04 | 1 |
| Democratic Forum for Labour and Liberties | 10,432 | 7.68 | 1 |
| New Destour Party | 5,826 | 4.29 | 1 |
| Popular Petition | 5,310 | 3.91 | 1 |
| Total | 135,874 | 100.00 | 7 |
Source: ISIE.tn

Election results: Tunis 1
| Parties | Votes | % | Seats |
|---|---|---|---|
| Ennahda Movement | 94,938 | 45.43 | 4 |
| Democratic Forum for Labour and Liberties | 27,179 | 13.00 | 1 |
| Congress for the Republic | 17,399 | 8.33 | 1 |
| Progressive Democratic Party | 6,971 | 3.34 | 1 |
| Progressive Struggle Party | 5,860 | 2.80 | 1 |
| Democratic Modernist Pole | 5,010 | 2.40 | 1 |
| Total | 208,995 | 100.00 | 9 |
Source: ISIE.tn

Election results: Tunis 2
| Parties | Votes | % | Seats |
|---|---|---|---|
| Ennahda Movement | 68,131 | 29.93 | 3 |
| Democratic Forum for Labour and Liberties | 43,142 | 18.95 | 2 |
| Congress for the Republic | 24,296 | 10.67 | 1 |
| Democratic Modernist Pole | 18,709 | 8.22 | 1 |
| Progressive Democratic Party | 13,361 | 5.87 | 1 |
| Total | 227,647 | 100.00 | 8 |
Source: ISIE.tn

=== Cap Bon ===
Election results: Nabeul 1
| Parties | Votes | % | Seats |
|---|---|---|---|
| Ennahda Movement | 53,362 | - | 2 |
| Congress for the Republic | 41,027 | - | 1 |
| Democratic Forum for Labour and Liberties | 16,533 | - | 1 |
| Popular Petition | 13,277 | - | 1 |
| Afek Tounes | 7,184 | - | 1 |
| Progressive Democratic Party | 6,364 | - | 1 |
| Independent lists | - | - | - |
| Valid votes | - | - | 7 |
| Blank or invalid votes | - | - | |
| Total | - | 100.00 | |
| Voter turnout | - | | |
| Electorate | - | | |

Election results: Nabeul 2
| Parties | Votes | % | Seats |
|---|---|---|---|
| Ennahda Movement | 36,512 | - | 2 |
| Congress for the Republic | 17,799 | - | 1 |
| Democratic Forum for Labour and Liberties | 9,766 | - | 1 |
| Popular Petition | 7,640 | - | 1 |
| Progressive Democratic Party | 5,578 | - | 1 |
| Independent lists | - | - | - |
| Valid votes | - | - | 6 |
| Blank or invalid votes | - | - | |
| Total | - | 100.00 | |
| Voter turnout | - | | |
| Electorate | - | | |

=== Northwest ===
Election results: Béja
| Parties | Votes | % | Seats |
|---|---|---|---|
| Ennahda Movement | 28,041 | - | 2 |
| Popular Petition | 8,264 | | 1 |
| Progressive Democratic Party | 7,723 | - | 1 |
| Democratic Forum for Labour and Liberties | 6,870 | | 1 |
| Congress for the Republic | 6,820 | | 1 |
| Valid votes | - | - | 6 |
| Blank or invalid votes | - | - | |
| Total | - | 100.00 | |
| Voter turnout | - | | |
| Electorate | - | | |

Election results: Bizerte
| Parties | Votes | % | Seats |
|---|---|---|---|
| Ennahda Movement | 80,576 | - | 4 |
| Congress for the Republic | 15,588 | | 1 |
| Democratic Forum for Labour and Liberties | 13,180 | - | 1 |
| People's Movement | 10,353 | - | 1 |
| Progressive Democratic Party | 10,285 | | 1 |
| Popular Petition | 9,987 | | 1 |
| Valid votes | - | - | 9 |
| Blank or invalid votes | - | - | |
| Total | - | 100.00 | |
| Voter turnout | - | | |
| Electorate | - | | |

Election results: Jendouba
| Parties | Votes | % | Seats |
|---|---|---|---|
| Ennahda Movement | 33,136 | - | 2 |
| Popular Petition | 12,433 | | 1 |
| Democratic Forum for Labour and Liberties | 8,627 | | 1 |
| Progressive Democratic Party | 6,338 | - | 1 |
| Congress for the Republic | 5,616 | | 1 |
| Social Struggle (independent) | 4,749 | - | 1 |
| Democratic Patriots' Movement | 3,599 | | 1 |
| Valid votes | - | - | 8 |
| Blank or invalid votes | - | - | |
| Total | - | 100.00 | |
| Voter turnout | - | | |
| Electorate | - | | |

Election results: Kef
| Parties | Votes | % | Seats |
|---|---|---|---|
| Ennahda Movement | 23,015 | - | 2 |
| Popular Petition | 6,594 | - | 1 |
| Hope (independent) | 6,022 | - | 1 |
| Congress for the Republic | 5,346 | | 1 |
| Democratic Forum for Labour and Liberties | 4,455 | | 1 |
| Valid votes | - | - | 6 |
| Blank or invalid votes | - | - | |
| Total | - | 100.00 | |
| Voter turnout | - | | |
| Electorate | - | | |

Election results: Siliana
| Parties | Votes | % | Seats |
|---|---|---|---|
| Ennahda Movement | 20,135 | 27.43 | 2 |
| Popular Petition | 6,229 | 8.48 | 1 |
| Free Patriotic Union | 4,456 | 6.07 | 1 |
| Tunisian Workers' Communist Party | 3,854 | 5.25 | 1 |
| Progressive Democratic Party | 3,515 | 4.78 | 1 |
| Independent lists | - | - | - |
| Valid votes | 73,414 | - | 6 |
| Blank or invalid votes | - | - | |
| Total | - | 100.00 | |
| Voter turnout | - | | |
| Electorate | - | | |

=== Center ===
Election results: Kairouan
| Parties | Votes | % | Seats |
|---|---|---|---|
| Ennahda Movement | 70,192 | - | 4 |
| Popular Petition | 30,084 | | 2 |
| Congress for the Republic | 7,700 | | 1 |
| Democratic Forum for Labour and Liberties | 3,718 | - | 1 |
| Tunisian Workers' Communist Party | 2,713 | - | 1 |
| Independent lists | - | - | - |
| Valid votes | - | - | 9 |
| Blank or invalid votes | - | - | |
| Total | - | 100.00 | |
| Voter turnout | - | | |
| Electorate | - | | |

Election results: Kasserine
| Parties | Votes | % | Seats |
|---|---|---|---|
| Ennahda Movement | 40,971 | - | 3 |
| Popular Petition | | | 1 |
| Congress for the Republic | 8,196 | - | 1 |
| Movement of Socialist Democrats | 5,758 | | 1 |
| Progressive Democratic Party | 5,587 | | 1 |
| Loyalty (independent) | 5,070 | - | 1 |
| Democratic Forum for Labour and Liberties | 3,263 | | - |
| Valid votes | - | - | 8 |
| Blank or invalid votes | - | - | |
| Total | - | 100.00 | |
| Voter turnout | - | | |
| Electorate | - | | |

Election results: Sidi Bouzid
| Parties | Votes | % | Seats |
|---|---|---|---|
| Popular Petition | 48,022 | 56.0 | 3 |
| Ennahda Movement | 19,698 | 23.0 | 2 |
| The Independent (independent) | 11,980 | 14.0 | 1 |
| People's Movement | 3,626 | 4.1 | 1 |
| Movement of Socialist Democrats | 2,472 | 2.9 | 1 |
| Congress for the Republic | 2,131 | | - |
| Democratic Patriots' Movement | 2,026 | | - |
| Valid votes | 85,798 | - | 8 |
| Blank or invalid votes | - | - | |
| Total | - | 100.00 | |
| Voter turnout | - | | |
| Electorate | - | | |

Election results: Zaghouan
| Parties | Votes | % | Seats |
|---|---|---|---|
| Ennahda Movement | 21,285 | - | 2 |
| Popular Petition | 5,561 | - | 1 |
| Democratic Modernist Pole | 3,702 | | 1 |
| Congress for the Republic | 3,099 | | 1 |
| Independent lists | - | - | - |
| Valid votes | - | - | 5 |
| Blank or invalid votes | - | - | |
| Total | - | 100.00 | |
| Voter turnout | - | | |
| Electorate | - | | |

=== Center-East ===
Election results: Mahdia
| Parties | Votes | % | Seats |
|---|---|---|---|
| Ennahda Movement | 40,738 | 30.17 | 3 |
| Popular Petition | 9,707 | 7.19 | 1 |
| The Initiative | 8,881 | 6.58 | 1 |
| Congress for the Republic | 8,352 | 6.18 | 1 |
| Afek Tounes | 8,096 | 6 | 1 |
| Equity and Equality Party | 6,098 | 4.52 | 1 |
| Valid votes | 135,043 | - | 8 |
| Blank or invalid votes | - | - | |
| Total | - | 100.00 | |
| Voter turnout | - | | |
| Electorate | - | | |

Election results: Monastir
| Parties | Votes | % | Seats |
|---|---|---|---|
| Ennahda Movement | 65,800 | - | 3 |
| The Initiative | 36,035 | - | 2 |
| Congress for the Republic | 8,833 | | 1 |
| Democratic Forum for Labour and Liberties | 7,862 | | 1 |
| Popular Petition | 6,736 | | 1 |
| Cultural Unionist Nation Party | 5,219 | - | 1 |
| Valid votes | - | - | 9 |
| Blank or invalid votes | - | - | |
| Total | - | 100.00 | |
| Voter turnout | - | | |
| Electorate | - | | |

Election results: Sousse
| Parties | Votes | % | Seats |
|---|---|---|---|
| Ennahda Movement | 86,590 | - | 4 |
| The Initiative | 52,573 | - | 2 |
| Congress for the Republic | 12,926 | | 1 |
| Popular Petition | 12,160 | | 1 |
| Democratic Forum for Labour and Liberties | 10,051 | | 1 |
| Progressive Democratic Party | 7,519 | | 1 |
| Independent lists | - | - | - |
| Valid votes | - | - | 10 |
| Blank or invalid votes | - | - | |
| Total | - | 100.00 | |
| Voter turnout | - | | |
| Electorate | - | | |

=== Southwest ===
Election results: Gafsa
| Parties | Votes | % | Seats |
|---|---|---|---|
| Ennahda Movement | 48,976 | - | 3 |
| Congress for the Republic | 9,636 | - | 1 |
| Popular Petition | 6,545 | | 1 |
| Progressive Democratic Party | 3,170 | | 1 |
| Justice (independent) | - | - | 1 |
| Valid votes | - | - | 7 |
| Blank or invalid votes | - | - | |
| Total | - | 100.00 | |
| Voter turnout | - | | |
| Electorate | - | | |

Election results: Kebili
| Parties | Votes | % | Seats |
|---|---|---|---|
| Ennahda Movement | 28,041 | | 2 |
| Congress for the Republic | 19,456 | | 2 |
| Popular Petition | 2,809 | - | 1 |
| Valid votes | - | - | 5 |
| Blank or invalid votes | - | - | |
| Total | - | 100.00 | |
| Voter turnout | - | | |
| Electorate | - | | |

Election results: Tataouine
| Parties | Votes | % | Seats |
|---|---|---|---|
| Ennahda Movement | 24,975 | - | 3 |
| Popular Petition | 2,399 | - | 1 |
| Progressive Democratic Party | 1,980 | - | - |
| Independent lists | - | - | - |
| Valid votes | - | - | 4 |
| Blank or invalid votes | - | - | |
| Total | - | 100.00 | |
| Voter turnout | - | | |
| Electorate | - | | |

Election results: Tozeur
| Parties | Votes | % | Seats |
|---|---|---|---|
| Ennahda Movement | 18,994 | - | 2 |
| Loyalty to the Martyrs (independent) | 2,540 | - | 1 |
| Congress for the Republic | 2,217 | | 1 |
| Independent lists | - | - | - |
| Valid votes | - | - | 4 |
| Blank or invalid votes | - | - | |
| Total | - | 100.00 | |
| Voter turnout | - | | |
| Electorate | - | | |

=== Southeast ===
Election results: Gabès
| Parties | Votes | % | Seats |
|---|---|---|---|
| Ennahda Movement | 73,416 | - | 4 |
| Congress for the Republic | 13,771 | - | 1 |
| Tunisian National Front (independent) | 7,421 | - | 1 |
| Popular Petition | 7,351 | | 1 |
| Valid votes | 138,175 | - | 7 |
| Blank or invalid votes | - | - | |
| Total | - | 100.00 | |
| Voter turnout | - | | |
| Electorate | - | | |

Election results: Medenine
| Parties | Votes | % | Seats |
|---|---|---|---|
| Ennahda Movement | 73,316 | - | 5 |
| Congress for the Republic | 15,164 | - | 1 |
| Afek Tounes | 8,788 | | 1 |
| Popular Petition | 6,315 | | 1 |
| Democratic Modernist Pole | 5,795 | | 1 |
| Valid votes | - | - | 9 |
| Blank or invalid votes | - | - | |
| Total | - | 100.00 | |
| Voter turnout | - | | |
| Electorate | - | | |

Election results: Sfax 1
| Parties | Votes | % | Seats |
|---|---|---|---|
| Ennahda Movement | 66,402 | - | 3 |
| Congress for the Republic | 14,302 | - | 1 |
| Popular Petition | 11,840 | - | 1 |
| Democratic Forum for Labour and Liberties | 6,884 | - | 1 |
| PCOT | 5,306 | - | 1 |
| Independent lists | - | - | - |
| Valid votes | - | - | 7 |
| Blank or invalid votes | - | - | |
| Total | - | 100.00 | |
| Voter turnout | - | | |
| Electorate | - | | |

Election results: Sfax 2
| Parties | Votes | % | Seats |
|---|---|---|---|
| Ennahda Movement | 81,816 | - | 4 |
| Congress for the Republic | 28,126 | - | 1 |
| Popular Petition | 18,664 | | 1 |
| Future Voice (independent) | 13,432 | - | 1 |
| Democratic Forum for Labour and Liberties | 13,032 | | 1 |
| Afek Tounes | 5,304 | | 1 |
| Valid votes | - | - | 9 |
| Blank or invalid votes | - | - | |
| Total | - | 100.00 | |
| Voter turnout | - | | |
| Electorate | - | | |

=== Tunisians Abroad ===
Election results: France 1
| Parties | Votes | % | Seats |
|---|---|---|---|
| Ennahda Movement | 22,672 | 33.52 | 2 |
| Congress for the Republic | 8,445 | 12.49 | 1 |
| Democratic Forum for Labour and Liberties | 7,571 | 11.19 | 1 |
| Democratic Modernist Pole | 5,555 | 8.21 | 1 |
| Independent lists | - | - | - |
| Valid votes | - | - | 5 |
| Blank or invalid votes | - | - | |
| Total | 67,640 | 100.00 | |
| Voter turnout | - | | |
| Electorate | - | | |

Election results: France 2
| Parties | Votes | % | Seats |
|---|---|---|---|
| Ennahda Movement | 17,103 | 33.99 | 2 |
| Congress for the Republic | 5,006 | 9.95 | 1 |
| Democratic Forum for Labour and Liberties | 4,148 | 8.24 | 1 |
| ~~Popular Petition~~ (disqualified) | - | - | ~~1~~ |
| Progressive Democratic Party | 4,022 | 7.99 | +1 |
| Independent lists | - | - | - |
| Valid votes | - | - | 5 |
| Blank or invalid votes | - | - | |
| Total | 50,314 | 100.00 | |
| Voter turnout | - | | |
| Electorate | - | | |

Election results: Germany
| Parties | Votes | % | Seats |
|---|---|---|---|
| Ennahda Movement | 5,707 | 42.77 | 1 |
| Congress for the Republic | 2,288 | 17.15 | - |
| Democratic Forum for Labour and Liberties | 1,788 | 13.40 | - |
| Popular Petition | 1,088 | 8.15 | - |
| Democratic Modernist Pole | 923 | 6.92 | - |
| People's Movement | 129 | 0.97 | - |
| Popular Republican Union | 94 | 0.70 | - |
| Independent lists | 962 | 7.21 | - |
| Valid votes | 13,289 | 99.60 | 1 |
| Blank or invalid votes | 53 | 0.40 | |
| Total | 13,342 | 100.00 | |
| Voter turnout | - | | |
| Electorate | - | | |
Source: IRIE Germany

Election results: Italy
| Parties | Votes | % | Seats |
|---|---|---|---|
| Ennahda Movement | 11,627 | 49.00 | 2 |
| Popular Petition | 2,683 | 11.31 | 1 |
| Independent lists | - | - | - |
| Valid votes | - | - | 3 |
| Blank or invalid votes | - | - | |
| Total | 23,728 | 100.00 | |
| Voter turnout | - | | |
| Electorate | - | | |

Election results: Americas & rest of Europe
| Parties | Votes | % | Seats |
|---|---|---|---|
| Ennahda Movement | 10,218 | 35.0 | 1 |
| Congress for the Republic | 5,411 | 18.5 | 1 |
| Democratic Forum for Labour and Liberties | 4,780 | 16.4 | - |
| Progressive Democratic Party | 2,730 | 9.4 | - |
| Democratic Modernist Pole | 2,565 | 8.8 | - |
| Afek Tounes | 695 | 2.4 | - |
| Popular Petition | 522 | 1.8 | - |
| Independent lists | 2,259 | 7.7 | - |
| Valid votes | 29,180 | 95.4 | 2 |
| Invalid votes | 1,273 | 4.1 | |
| Blank votes | 299 | 1.0 | |
| Total | 30,752 | 100.0 | |
Source: ISIE

Election results: Arab world & rest of the World
| Parties | Votes | % | Seats |
|---|---|---|---|
| Ennahda Movement | 8,704 | 45.8 | 1 |
| Congress for the Republic | 2,760 | 14.5 | 1 |
| Democratic Forum for Labour and Liberties | 2,142 | 11.3 | - |
| Progressive Democratic Party | 1,386 | 7.3 | - |
| Democratic Modernist Pole | 1,112 | 5.9 | - |
| Popular Petition | 635 | 3.3 | - |
| Afek Tounes | 412 | 2.2 | - |
| Other parties and independent lists | 1,854 | 9.8 | - |
| Valid votes | 19,005 | 94.9 | 2 |
| Invalid votes | 800 | 4.0 | |
| Blank votes | 226 | 1.1 | |
| Total | 20,031 | 100.0 | |
Source: ISIE

== Seats distribution by constituency ==
=== Cap Bon ===
Seats distribution: Nabeul 1
| Member | Party |
|---|---|
| Member 1 | Ennahda |
| Member 2 | Ennahda |
| Member 3 | CPR |
| Member 4 | Ettakatol |
| Member 5 | Popular Petition |
| Member 6 | PDP |
| Member 7 | Afek |

Seats distribution: Nabeul 1
| Member | Party |
|---|---|
| Member 1 | Ennahda |
| Member 2 | Ennahda |
| Member 3 | CPR |
| Member 4 | Ettakatol |
| Member 5 | Popular Petition |
| Member 6 | PDP |

=== Tunisians Abroad ===
Seats distribution: France 1
| Member | Party |
|---|---|
| Amer Laaraiedh | Ennahda |
| Mehrzia Laabidi | Ennahda |
| Imed Daimi | CPR |
| Slim Ben Abdesslem | Ettakatol |
| Nadia Chaabane | PDM |
Source: Tunisie-Etudes.info

Seats distribution: France 2
| Member | Party |
|---|---|
| Néji Jmal | Ennahda |
| Dalila Babba | Ennahda |
| Hedi Ben Abbas | CPR |
| Karima Souid | Ettakatol |
| Mohamed Elmay | PDP |
Source: Tunisie-Etudes.info

Seats distribution: Germany
| Member | Party |
|---|---|
| Fathi Ayadi | Ennahda |
Source: Tunisie-Etudes.info

Seats distribution: Italy
| Member | Party |
|---|---|
| Oussama Essghaier | Ennahda |
| Imen Ben Ahmed | Ennahda |
| Abdessatar Dhifi | Popular Petition |
Source: Tunisie-Etudes.info

Seats distribution: Americas & rest of Europe
| Member | Party |
|---|---|
| Mohamed Zrig | Ennahda |
| Mabrouka Mbarek | CPR |
Source: Tunisie-Etudes.info

Seats distribution: Arab world & rest of the World
| Member | Party |
|---|---|
| Kamel Ben Amara | Ennahda |
| Ikbel Msadaa | CPR |
Source: Tunisie-Etudes.info
