= Mbarek =

Mbarek is a surname and a given name. Notable people with the name include:

== Given name ==
- Mbarek Bekkay (1907–1961), the first Prime Minister of Morocco (1955–1958)
- Mbarek El Filali (1955–2021), Moroccan footballer
- Mbarek Hussein Kipkorir (born 1965), Kenyan athlete, long-distance runner
- Mbarek Rabi (born 1938), Moroccan novelist and short-story writer
- Mbarek Soltani (born 1982), boxer from Algeria
- Mbarek Zarrougui (born 1954), Moroccan Olympic boxer

== Surname ==
- Ammouri Mbarek (1951–2015), renovator of Moroccan Amazigh (Berber) Music
- Chebbi Mbarek (born 1964), Tunisian volleyball player
- Mabrouka Mbarek (born 1980), Tunisian academic and politician
- Slaheddine Ben Mbarek (1920–2014), Tunisian minister and diplomat
- Sonia Mbarek (born 1969), Tunisian singer of classical Arabic music

== See also ==
- Oulad Mbarek or Oulad Embarek, town in Béni-Mellal Province, Béni Mellal-Khénifra, Morocco
