= Football at the 1973 All-Africa Games =

1973 All-Africa Games football tournament
Tournament details
- Host country: Nigeria
- City: Lagos
- Dates: 8–16 January
- Teams: 8 (from 1 confederation)
- Venue: 2 (in 1 host city)

Final positions
- Champions: Nigeria (1st title)
- Runners-up: Guinea
- Third place: Egypt
- Fourth place: Ghana

Tournament statistics
- Matches played: 16
- Goals scored: 65 (4.06 per match)

The 1973 All-Africa Games football tournament was the 2nd edition of the African Games men's football tournament. The football tournament was held in Lagos, Nigeria between 8–16 January 1973 as part of the 1973 All-Africa Games.

== Qualified teams ==
The following teams qualified for the final tournament:

Zone	Team
Hosts	Nigeria
Zone I	Algeria
Zone II	Guinea
Zone III	Ghana
Zone IV	Upper Volta
Zone V	Congo
Zone VI	Egypt
Zone VII	Tanzania

== Group stage ==
=== Group 1 ===
Team	Pld	W	D	L	GF	GA	GD	Pts
Nigeria	3	2	1	0	8	5	+3	5
Ghana	3	2	0	1	5	4	+1	4
Algeria	3	1	1	1	6	6	0	3
Tanzania	3	0	0	3	3	7	−4	0

8 January 1973

Nigeria	4–2	Ghana
Igwe (pen.); Dombraye; Oyarekhua		Owusu; Sam

Surulere Stadium, Lagos
Attendance: 60 000
8 January 1973

Algeria	4–2	Tanzania
Dahleb 29', 56'; Dali 65', 77'		Gobon 63'; Abderahmane 83'

Surulere Stadium, Lagos
Attendance: 10 000
Referee: Farah Weheliye Addo (Somalia)

10 January 1973

Nigeria	2–2	Algeria
Njoku 36'; Oyarekhua 56'		Dali 50', 75'

Surulere Stadium, Lagos
Attendance: 50 000
Referee: Théodore Laclé (Togo)
10 January 1973

Ghana	1–0	Tanzania
Owusu

Surulere Stadium, Lagos

12 January 1973

Nigeria	2–1	Tanzania
Igwe ?		Goal

Surulere Stadium, Lagos
12 January 1973

Ghana	2–0	Algeria
Oppong 38' (pen.); Sam 68'

Surulere Stadium, Lagos
Attendance: 7 000
Referee: Farah Weheliye Addo (Somalia)

=== Group 2 ===
Team	Pld	W	D	L	GF	GA	GD	Pts
Guinea	3	3	0	0	12	4	+8	6
Egypt	3	2	0	1	8	7	+1	4
Congo	3	1	0	2	5	8	−3	2
Upper Volta	3	0	0	3	4	10	−6	0

8 January 1973

Congo	3–0	Upper Volta
Goal

Liberty Stadium, Ibadan
8 January 1973

Guinea	4–1	Egypt
Kandia ? ? ?		Khalil 67'

Liberty Stadium, Ibadan

10 January 1973

Egypt	3–1	Congo
Bazouka; Abo Greisha; Darwish		Goal

Liberty Stadium, Ibadan
10 January 1973

Guinea	3–2	Upper Volta
Goal		Goal

Liberty Stadium, Ibadan

12 January 1973

Guinea	5–1	Congo
Kandia ? ? ?		Goal

Liberty Stadium, Ibadan
12 January 1973

Egypt	4–2	Upper Volta
Abo Greisha; Gaafar		Goal

Liberty Stadium, Ibadan

== Knockout phase ==
Semifinals
14 January – Lagos
Nigeria	4
Egypt	2
14 January – Ibadan
Guinea	2
Ghana	1

Final
16 January – Lagos
Nigeria	2
Guinea	0
Third place
16 January – Lagos
Egypt	2
Ghana	1

=== Semi-finals ===
14 January 1973

Nigeria	4–2	Egypt
Oyarekhua; Olayombo		Gaafar 83'; Shehata 85' (pen.)

Surulere Stadium, Lagos

14 January 1973

Guinea	2–1	Ghana
Goal		Owusu

Liberty Stadium, Ibadan

=== Third place playoff ===
16 January 1973

Egypt	2–1	Ghana
Abo Greisha; Bazouka		Goal

Surulere Stadium, Lagos

=== Final ===
16 January 1973

Nigeria	2–0	Guinea
Oyarekhua

Surulere Stadium, Lagos
Attendance: 60,000

== Final ranking ==
Rank	Team	Pld	W	D	L	GF	GA	GD	Pts
1	Nigeria (H)	5	4	1	0	14	7	+7	9
2	Guinea	5	4	0	1	14	7	+7	8
3	Egypt	5	3	0	2	12	12	0	6
4	Ghana	5	2	0	3	7	8	−1	4
Eliminated in the group stage
5	Algeria	3	1	1	1	6	6	0	3
6	Congo	3	1	0	2	5	8	−3	2
7	Tanzania	3	0	0	3	3	7	−4	0
8	Upper Volta	3	0	0	3	4	10	−6	0
Total		32	15	2	15	65	65	0	32
