= Ricardo Delgado (boxer) =

Mexican boxer (born 1947)

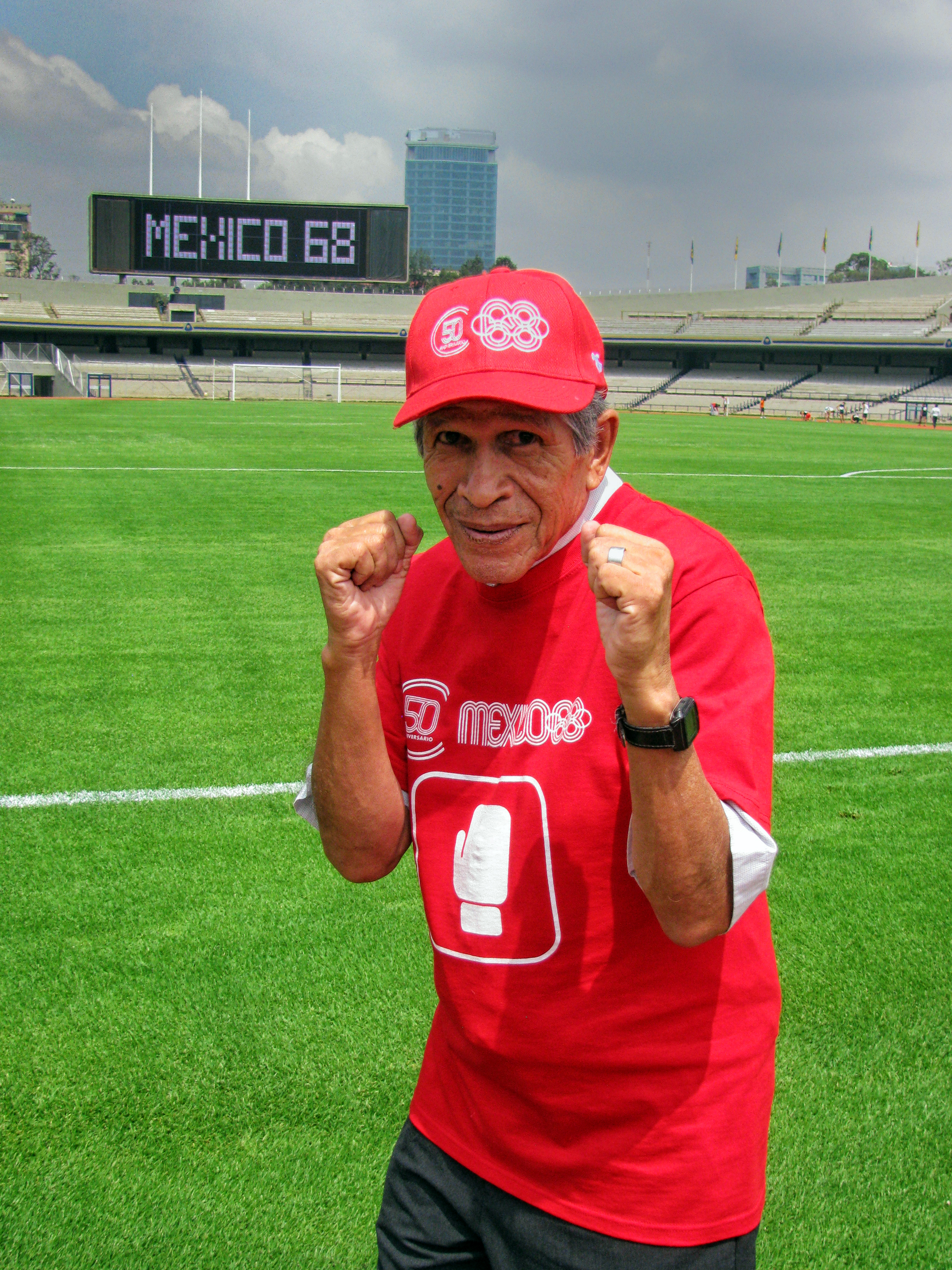
- Delgado in 2018

Personal information
- Born: 13 July 1947 (age 78) Mexico City, Mexico
- Height: 1.61 m (5 ft 3 in)
- Weight: 51 kg (112 lb)

Sport
- Sport: Boxing
- Weight class: Flyweight
Medal record
Men's boxing
Representing Mexico
Olympic Games
Gold medal – first place	1968 Mexico City	Flyweight -51 kg
Pan American Games
Silver medal – second place	1967 Winnipeg	Flyweight -51 kg

Ricardo Delgado Nogales (Note: In this Spanish name, the first or paternal surname is Delgado and the second or maternal family name is Nogales.) (born 13 July 1947) is a Mexican former professional boxer who competed from 1968 to 1975. As an amateur, he won a gold medal at the 1968 Summer Olympics in Mexico City in the flyweight division (−51 kg).

Delgado turned pro in 1968 and had limited success. After being undefeated in his first ten fights, he lost a decision to Davey Vasquez in 1971, a bout in which Delgado was knocked down once in the 5th and 6th rounds. Delgado's career went downhill after the loss and he retired four years later with a career record of having won 14, lost 12, and drawn 5.

== 1968 Olympic results ==
Below is the record of Ricardo Delgado, a Mexican flyweight boxer who competed at the 1968 Mexico Olympics:

- Round of 32: bye
- Round of 16: defeated Brendan McCarthy (Ireland) by decision, 5-0
- Quarterfinal: defeated Tetsuaki Nakamura (Japan) by decision, 5-0
- Semifinal: defeated Servílio de Oliveira (Brazil) by decision, 5-0
- Final: defeated Artur Olech (Poland) by decision, 5-0 (won gold medal)
