= Tito Pereyra =

Argentine boxer (born 1949)

Personal information
- Born: 1 February 1949 Córdoba, Argentina
- Died: 14 November 2019 (aged 70)

Sport
- Sport: Boxing

Tito Pereyra (1 February 1949 – 14 November 2019) was an Argentine boxer. He competed in the men's flyweight event at the 1968 Summer Olympics. At the 1968 Summer Olympics he defeated Robert Carney of Australia in the Round of 32 before losing to Tetsuaki Nakamura of Japan in the Round of 16.
