= Jorge Alves =

Jorge Alves may refer to:

- Jorge Alves (ice hockey) (born 1979), American ice hockey goaltender
- Jorge Alves (volleyball) (born 1978), Portuguese volleyball player in 2002 FIVB Volleyball Men's World Championship squads
- Jorge Alves (footballer) (born 1996), East Timorese player in the 2011 AFF U-16 Youth Championship
- Jorge Alves (Cape Verdean footballer) (born 1991), Cape Verdean footballer

== See also ==
- Jorge Alves Barcelos
- Jorge Alves da Silva
