= Johnny McGonigle =

British boxer

Personal information
- Nationality: British
- Born: 14 September 1944 (age 80); Motherwell, Scotland

Sport
- Sport: Boxing

Johnny McGonigle (born 14 September 1944) is a British boxer. He competed in the men's flyweight event at the 1968 Summer Olympics. At the 1968 Summer Olympics, he lost to Tetsuaki Nakamura of Japan.

He won the 1968 Amateur Boxing Association British flyweight title, when boxing for the Army BC.
