= Mwansa =

Mwansa is a surname. Notable people with the surname include:

- Kalombo Mwansa (born 1955), Zambian politician
- Kenny Mwansa (born 1949), Zambian boxer
- Sebastian Mwansa (born 1988), Zambian footballer
- Tolomeo Mwansa (1941–2014), Zambian footballer
