= Chan Wa-yen =

Taiwanese boxer (born 1946)

Personal information
- Nationality: Taiwanese
- Born: 7 April 1946 (age 79) Taipei, Taiwan

Sport
- Sport: Boxing

Chinese name
- Traditional Chinese: 陳維仁
- Simplified Chinese: 陈维仁
Transcriptions
Standard Mandarin
- Hanyu Pinyin: Chén Wéirén
- Wade–Giles: Ch'en Wei-jen
- IPA: [ʈʂʰə̌n wěɪɻə̌n]
Yue: Cantonese
- Jyutping: Can4 Wai4 Jan4

Chan Wa-yen (traditional Chinese: 陳維仁; simplified Chinese: 陈维仁; born 7 April 1946) is a Taiwanese boxer. He competed in the men's flyweight event at the 1968 Summer Olympics. Chan attended the National Taiwan University of Sport. He competed at the 1966 Asian Games and received a bronze medal at the 1967 Asian Amateur Boxing Championships.

== Biography ==
Chan Wa-yen was born 7 April 1946 in Taipei, Taiwan not long after the transfer of Taiwan from Japanese to ROC control. He competed at the selection trials for the 1965 Asian Amateur Boxing Championships at the Taipei Public Monopoly Bureau Gymnasium (台北公賣局體育館). He was among four Taiwanese athletes to qualify for the Light Flyweight D boxing division in May 1965. Chan competed at the 54th National Day Boxing Championships at the Taipei Public Monopoly Bureau Gymnasium. He placed first in the Light C boxing division. At the Provincial Games (省運) in October 1965, Chan represented Taichung County in the bantamweight division and was defeated in a preliminary round. Chan was attending National Taiwan University of Sport in 1966. He competed in September 1966 at the Hsinchu City Civic Activity Center Gymnasium (新竹市民眾活動中心體育館) in the selection trials for the 1966 Asian Games in the light D division (輕丁級). In one event, Chen Tung-kai (陳東凱) defeated him 3–2. The Republic of China Sports Federation chose Chan on 21 October 1966 to compete in the light D division at the 1966 Asian Games. At the 1966 Asian Games in Bangkok, Son Young-chan (孫永燦) of South Korea defeated Chan in the first round and Chan was eliminated.

Chan competed at the Third Northern Region Eight-County Boxing Tournament (第三屆北區八縣市拳擊比賽) held in Keelung in April 1967. He was the winner of the light C division (輕丙級). At the 13th National College and High School Boxing Championship (十三屆大專中學學校拳擊錦標賽) in May 1967 in Changhua, Chan represented National Taiwan University of Sport. In the light C division, he placed first. Chan was chosen to compete in the selection finals for the light D division at the 1967 Asian Amateur Boxing Championships in Colombo, Ceylon. He was defeated 3–2 in the selection finals by Lin Ching-tung (林清東) in September 1967. In a rematch for the selection final, Chan won 3–1 against Lin and was later selected to join the national team to represent Taiwan at the Asian Amateur Boxing Championships. Chan attended a training camp with the four other athletes chosen to represent Taiwan at the Asian Amateur Boxing Championships. His coach, Huang Jung-lung (黃榮隆) said in November 1967 ahead of the championships that Chan's physical condition needed improvement, perhaps because Chan, in his third year of studies at National Taiwan University of Sport, had a challenging academic workload. He won a flyweight match 5–0 against the Japanese boxer Nakano (中野). In another match, he was defeated 2–3 by the Thai boxer Prapan Duangchaoom. Chan received a bronze medal at the 1967 Asian Amateur Boxing Championships. It had been his sixth professional boxing competition.

The China National Amateur Athletic Federation chose Chan to join its training camp which started on 16 February 1968. As part of the training camp, Chan and seven other students from his university temporarily transferred to National Taiwan Normal University. Chan competed in the selection for the 1968 Summer Olympics and won in the lightweight D class, defeating Cheng Cheng-po (鄭正博) 3–2 on 11 August 1968. Chan was chosen because the selection committee thought that he had a steady track record and strong technique. According to the United Daily News, at the time of his selection, he had "some stamina issues" that were owing to his effort to drop 3 kg (6.6 lb) in the previous week. Chan did not make a one-week training camp for the Olympics held in September 1968 as he was serving in the military. His coach, Lin Chung-fu (林忠孚), said he needed to drop 4 kg (8.8 lb) from his current weight of 55 kg (121 lb) to meet the flyweight weight maximum. According to Lin, Chan had steadily gained weight in the military, where he followed a structured and nutritient-rich lifestyle. Chan went on leave from the military, traveling from Kaohsiung's Zuoying District to Taipei to join the training camp on 24 September 1968. Chan was defeated 5–0 by the Thai boxer Prapan Duangchaoom in the men's flyweight event at the Olympics. The scores from the five judges were 58–59, 57–60, 59–60, 58–60, and 55–60. According to the Central News Agency, Chan maintained a defensive posture throughout the competition and did not have strong punches that could subdue his challenger. Chan had to lose over 4 kg (8.8 lb) in 13 days because he had been unable to obtain leave from his military training sooner. The rapid weight loss caused him to be significantly weakened before the competition. Shih Ko-min of United Daily News concluded, "In our country, there are often many uncoordinated systems that hinder athletic progress and affect the training of national teams. This is one such example." After his defeat, Chan returned to the locker room, rested his arm on his coach Lin's shoulder, and sobbed. Profoundly touched, Lin responded in tears, "The athlete fought with all his might, but who will cheer him on?" The boxing team leader Yen Hui-lin (顏惠霖) said, "I just feel sorry for these athletes. Why are they pushing themselves so hard? Chan Wa-yen couldn't even get leave; he never participated in the training camp. How can he compete?"
