= Brendan McCarthy (disambiguation) =

Brendan McCarthy is a British artist and designer.

Brendan McCarthy may also refer to:

- Brendan McCarthy (American football) (1945–1997), American footballer
- Brendan McCarthy (boxer) (born 1947), Irish Olympic boxer
- Brendan McCarthy (producer), Irish film producer
- Brendan McCarthy (actor), American actor
- Brandon McCarthy (born 1983), American baseball pitcher
