= Yadigar =

Yadigar, meaning "memento", may refer to:

== Given name ==
- Yadgar Muhammad Mirza (c.1452 – 1470), Timurid ruler of Herat
- Yadigar Talayhan (born 1995), Turkish judoka

== Surname ==
- Engin Yadigar (born 1944), Turkish boxer
