= Nikolay Novikov (disambiguation) =

Nikolay Novikov (1744–1818) was a Russian writer.

Nikolay Novikov may also refer to:

- Nikolai Novikov (diplomat) (1903–1989), Soviet diplomat
- Nikolay Novikov (boxer) (born 1946), Russian boxer
