= Getúlio =

Getúlio may refer to:

- Getulio Agostini (1943–1990), Venezuelan botanist
- Getulio Alviani (1939–2018), Italian painter
- Getúlio Côrtes (born 1938), Brazilian singer
- Getúlio (footballer, 1947-2008), Getúlio Pedro da Cruz, Brazilian football goalkeeper
- Getúlio (footballer, born 1954), Getúlio Costa de Oliveira, Brazilian football right-back
- Getulio Delphim (born 1938), Brazilian comic artist
- Getúlio Fredo (born 1954), Brazilian football manager
- Getúlio Júnior (born 1983), Brazilian footballer
- Getulio Napeñas (born 1959), Filipino politician
- Getúlio Pedro da Cruz (1947–2008), Brazilian footballer
- Getulio Vaca (born 1984), Bolivian footballer
- Getúlio Vargas (1882–1954), President of Brazil
- Getúlio (footballer, born 1997), Getúlio Wandelly Silva Timoteo, Brazilian football forward

== Places ==
- Getúlio Vargas, Rio Grande do Sul, Brazilian municipality
- Presidente Getúlio, Brazilian municipality

== Others ==
- Fundação Getulio Vargas, Brazilian think tank
- Getúlio (film), 2014 film about Vargas
- Sergeant Getulio, 1983 Brazilian drama film
