= David Vasquez =

American boxer (born 1948)

Personal information
- Born: October 11, 1948 (age 78) New York, New York, United States

Sport
- Sport: Boxing

David Vasquez (born October 11, 1948) is an American former boxer.

As an amateur in New York City, Vasquez won the New York Golden Gloves in three consecutive years from 1967 to 1969 and was the only champion to win at both the old Madison Square Garden and the new. He competed in the men's flyweight event at the 1968 Summer Olympics, which was won by Ricardo Delgado of Mexico. Vasquez would go on to defeat Delgado after they both turned professional.

Vasquez fought in 35 matches during a professional career that lasted from 1969 to 1982 while also working in the New York City Department of Parks and Recreation and attending Lehman College. Vasquez also found work in small acting roles in films including Saturday Night Fever, The French Connection and Serpico.
