= Filippo Grasso =

Italian boxer

Personal information
- Nationality: Italian
- Born: 15 November 1947 (age 78) Centuripe, Italy

Sport
- Sport: Boxing

Filippo Grasso (born 15 November 1947) is an Italian boxer. He competed in the men's flyweight event at the 1968 Summer Olympics.
