= Peter Fregene =

Nigerian footballer (1947–2024)

Personal information
- Date of birth: 17 May 1947
- Place of birth: Sapele, Colony and Protectorate of Nigeria
- Date of death: 13 October 2024 (aged 77)
- Position: Goalkeeper

Senior career*
Years	Team	Apps	(Gls)
1968	Stationery Stores		
?	ECN		

International career
1966–1983	Nigeria		
- * Club domestic league appearances and goals

Peter "Apu" Fregene, also known as The Flying Cat (17 May 1947 – 13 October 2024) was a Nigerian footballer who played as a goalkeeper.

== Club career ==
Born in Sapele, Fregene played club football for Lagos rivals ECN and Stationery Stores F.C. during a career that spanned the 1960s, 1970s and ECN later known as NEPA, Lagos between1978 and 1982. He was recalled to the National team in 1982 Nations'Cup in Libya. He won the Nigerian FA Cup with both ECN and Stationery Stores.

== International career ==
Fregene was the first choice goalkeeper for the Nigeria national football team from 1968 to 1971, before being recalled for the 1982 African Cup of Nations finals. He also represented Nigeria at the 1968 Summer Olympics in Mexico City.

== Death ==
Fregene died on 13 October 2024, at the age of 77.
