= Rodolfo Diaz (boxer, born 1946) =

Filipino boxer (born 1946)

Rodolfo Díaz
Personal information
- Nationality: Filipino
- Born: March 13, 1946 (age 80) Rizal, Philippines
- Height: 5 ft 3 in (161 cm)
- Weight: 112 lb (51 kg)

Sport
- Sport: Boxing

Rodolfo Díaz (born March 13, 1946) is a Filipino boxer. He competed in the men's flyweight event at the 1968 Summer Olympics. At the 1968 Summer Olympics, he lost to Kenny Mwansa of Zambia.
