= Mohammed El Filali =

Moroccan footballer (born 1945)

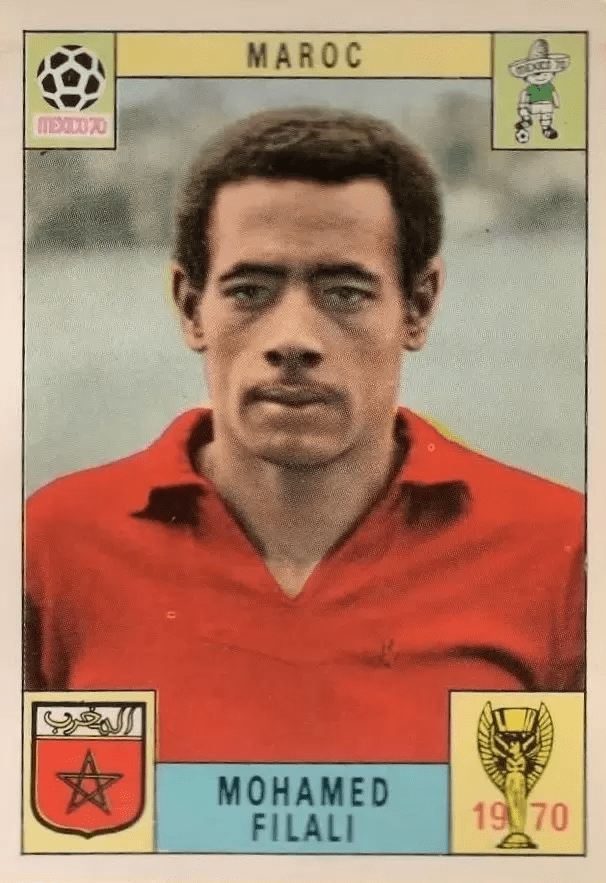
- El Filali at the 1970 FIFA World Cup

Personal information
- Full name: Mohammed ElFilali
- Date of birth: 9 July 1945 (age 81)
- Place of birth: El Malah, French Algeria
- Position: Forward

Senior career*
Years	Team	Apps	(Gls)
1962–1973	MC Oujda		
1973–1974	CR Témouchent		
1974–1979	MC Oujda		

International career
1968–1972	Morocco	31	(4)
- * Club domestic league appearances and goals

Mohammed El Filali (Arabic: محمد الفيلالي) (born 9 July 1945) is a Moroccan football forward who played for the Morocco in the 1970 FIFA World Cup. He also played for MC Oujda. Also, El Filali was a firefighter.

Born in El Malah (near the border of Morocco), Filali began playing senior football with MC Oujda in 1962. He became a regular starter for MC Oujda during the 1963–64 season, eventually playing all positions including goalkeeper for the club. Filali won the 1974–75 Botola with MC Oujda which led to his participation in the 1975 Mohammed V Cup.

His younger brother, Mbarek was also a Morocco international.

== Career statistics ==
=== International ===
Scores and results list Morocco's goal tally first, score column indicates score after each El Filali goal.

List of international goals scored by Mohammed El Filali
No.	Date	Venue	Opponent	Score	Result	Competition
1	21 September 1969	Stade d'Honneur, Casablanca, Morocco	Nigeria	1–0	2–1	1970 FIFA World Cup qualification
2	26 October 1969	Stade d'Honneur, Casablanca, Morocco	Sudan	1–0	3–0	1970 FIFA World Cup qualification
3	14 March 1971	Stade d'Honneur, Casablanca, Morocco	United Arab Republic	?–0	3–0	1972 Africa Cup of Nations qualification
4	31 August 1972	ESV-Stadion, Ingolstadt, West Germany	Malaysia	5–0	6–0	1972 Summer Olympics
