= Kenny Mwansa =

Zambian boxer (born 1949)

Personal information
- Nationality: Zambian
- Born: 14 July 1949 (age 75); Luanshya, Zambia

Sport
- Sport: Boxing

Kenny Mwansa (born 14 July 1949) is a Zambian boxer. He competed in the men's flyweight event at the 1968 Summer Olympics. At the 1968 Summer Olympics, he defeated Rodolfo Díaz of the Philippines, before losing to Nikolay Novikov of the Soviet Union.
