= Arnaldo (footballer, born 1947) =

Brazilian footballer

Personal information
- Full name: Arnaldo de Mattos
- Date of birth: 15 January 1947 (age 79)
- Place of birth: São Paulo, Brazil

International career
Years	Team	Apps	(Gls)
- Brazil Olympic

Arnaldo de Mattos (born 15 January 1947), known as Arnaldo, is a Brazilian footballer. He competed in the men's tournament at the 1968 Summer Olympics.
