= Clement Obojememe =

Nigerian footballer

Personal information
- Date of birth: 17 August 1945 (age 81)
- Place of birth: Lagos, Nigeria

International career
Years	Team	Apps	(Gls)
- Nigeria

Clement Obojememe (born 17 August 1945) is a Nigerian footballer. He competed in the men's tournament at the 1968 Summer Olympics.
