= Javier Ciáurriz =

Spanish footballer (born 1946)

Personal information
- Full name: Javier Ciáurriz Ciáurriz
- Date of birth: 5 March 1946 (age 80)
- Place of birth: Pamplona, Spain

International career
| Years | Team | Apps | (Gls) |
- Spain

Javier Ciáurriz Ciáurriz (born 5 March 1946) is a Spanish footballer. He competed in the men's tournament at the 1968 Summer Olympics.
