= Abdul Ganiyu Salami =

Association football player

Personal information
- Date of birth: 5 October 1942 (age 84)
- Place of birth: Ogbomosho, Colonial Nigeria

International career^{‡}
Years	Team	Apps	(Gls)
1965	Ghana	1	(0)
1967–1968	Nigeria	3	(0)
- ‡ National team caps and goals as of 27 June 2023

Abdul Ganiyu Salami (born 5 October 1942) is a Nigerian and Ghanaian footballer. Salami represented Ghana at the 1965 African Cup of Nations. In 1967 he switched to Nigeria. He competed in the men's tournament at the 1968 Summer Olympics.
