= Andrés Mendieta =

Spanish footballer

Personal information
- Full name: Andrés Mendieta Ocamica
- Date of birth: 12 February 1945 (age 81)
- Place of birth: Lekeitio, Spain
- Position: Goalkeeper

International career
Years	Team	Apps	(Gls)
- Spain

Andrés Mendieta (born 12 February 1945) is a Spanish former footballer who played as a goalkeeper. He competed in the men's tournament at the 1968 Summer Olympics. He is the father of footballer Gaizka Mendieta.
