= Marão (football manager) =

Brazilian footballer

Personal information
- Full name: Mário Celso de Abreu
- Date of birth: 8 May 1923
- Place of birth: Belo Horizonte, Brazil
- Date of death: 28 September 2013 (aged 93)
- Place of death: Belo Horizonte, Brazil

Managerial career
- Years: Team
- 1963: Atlético Mineiro
- 1963: Renascença
- 1963–1964: Cruzeiro
- 1964–1965: Atlético Mineiro
- 1968: Brazil Olympic
- 1970: Sport Recife
- 1973: Náutico
- 1977: Paysandu
- 1978: Ferroviária
- 1981: Noroeste
- 1982: Marília
- 1983: Marília
- 1985: Marília
- 1987: Democrata-SL

Mário Celso de Abreu (8 May 1923 – 28 September 2013), better known as Marão, was a Brazilian professional football manager.

== Career ==
Marão tried to start his career as a football player, but due to health problems, he gave up on the idea and trained as a physical education teacher. As a coach, he started in charge of the Minas Gerais state football team, where he was Brazilian champion in 1962. He received the chance to coach Atlético Mineiro in 1963, becoming state champion, and later coached several other teams, with emphasis on the Brazil Olympic team in 1968.

== Death ==
Marão died of natural causes at his residence, 28 September 2013 at the age of 93, in Bairro da Floresta, Belo Horizonte.

== Honours ==
Atlético Mineiro

- Campeonato Mineiro: 1963

Minas Gerais state team

- Campeonato Brasileiro de Seleções Estaduais: 1962
