= Isidro Sala =

Spanish footballer (1940–2022)

Personal information
- Full name: Isidro Sala Puigdevall
- Date of birth: 29 September 1940
- Place of birth: Vilamalla, Spain
- Date of death: 21 September 2022 (aged 81)
- Position: Central defender

Senior career*
Years	Team	Apps	(Gls)
- Girona

International career
- Spain
- * Club domestic league appearances and goals

Isidro Sala Puigdevall (29 September 1940 – 21 September 2022) was a Spanish footballer who played as a central defender for Girona. He competed in the men's tournament at the 1968 Summer Olympics.

== Career ==
Sala spent 13 seasons with Girona in the Tercera División, making a club record 432 appearances, and captained the side.

== Legacy ==
The Catalan Football Federation awarded him the Silver Medal for Sports Merit in 1976.

== Personal life and death ==
Sala's family had a farm in Vilamalla. He died on 21 September 2022, at the age of 81.
