= Robert Carney (boxer) =

Australian Olympic boxer (1968)

Personal information
- Nationality: Australian
- Born: 19 December 1947 (age 78)

Boxing career

Robert Carney (born 19 December 1947) is an Indigenous Australian retired boxer. Carney competed at the 1968 Mexico Olympics in the flyweight division.

== 1968 Olympic results ==
Below is the record of Robert Carney, an Australian flyweight boxer who competed at the 1968 Mexico City Olympics:

- Round of 32: lost to Tito Pereyra (Argentina) by decision, 1-4
