= Rafael Jaén =

Spanish footballer

Personal information
- Full name: Rafael Jaén Rodríguez
- Date of birth: 3 January 1948 (age 78)
- Place of birth: Córdoba, Spain

International career
Years	Team	Apps	(Gls)
- Spain

Rafael Jaén (born 3 January 1948) is a Spanish footballer. He competed in the men's tournament at the 1968 Summer Olympics.
