= Mohammed Lawal (footballer) =

Nigerian footballer

Personal information
- Date of birth: 23 September 1939 (age 87)
- Place of birth: Kaduna, Nigeria

Senior career*
Years	Team	Apps	(Gls)
- Stationery Stores
1975	Rochester Lancers	5	(0)

International career
1968–1969	Nigeria	7	(3)
- * Club domestic league appearances and goals

Mohammed Lawal (born 23 September 1939) is a Nigerian footballer. He competed in the men's tournament at the 1968 Summer Olympics.
