= József Ember =

Hungarian football manager (1908–1982)

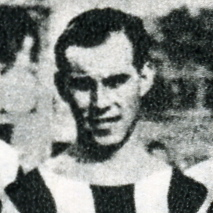
- Ember in 1929

Personal information
- Date of birth: 15 March 1908
- Date of death: 8 December 1982 (aged 74)

Managerial career
- Years: Team
- 1945–1946: Gamma FC
- 1949–1950: Újpest FC
- 1963: Ghana
- 1965–1968: Nigeria

József Ember (15 March 1908 – 8 December 1982) was a Hungarian football coach who managed the national sides of Ghana and Nigeria during the 1960s. During the 1950s, Ember also helped coach the China national team. Ember died on 8 December 1982, at the age of 74.
