= Chance (footballer) =

Brazilian footballer (born 1949)

Personal information
- Full name: Hamilton Rubio
- Date of birth: 4 March 1949 (age 77)
- Place of birth: São Paulo, Brazil
- Position: Forward

International career
Years	Team	Apps	(Gls)
- Brazil Olympic

Hamilton Rubio (born 4 March 1949), known as Chance, is a Brazilian footballer. He competed in the men's tournament at the 1968 Summer Olympics.
