= Sebastian Brodrick =

Nigerian footballer (1938–2024)

Personal information
- Date of birth: 9 July 1938
- Place of birth: Benin City, Colony and Protectorate of Nigeria
- Date of death: 3 January 2024 (aged 85)
- Place of death: Benin City, Nigeria

International career
| Years | Team | Apps | (Gls) |
- Nigeria

Sebastian Brodrick (9 July 1938 – 3 January 2024), also known as Sebastian Broderick-Imasuen, was a Nigerian footballer. He competed in the men's tournament at the 1968 Summer Olympics. In 1985, Brodrick coached the Nigeria under-17 national team to victory at the inaugural 1985 FIFA U-16 World Championship in China, winning the final match in Beijing against West Germany by a score of 2–0.

Brodrick died on 3 January 2024, at the age of 85. He had been diagnosed with an ischemic stroke in December 2022.
