= Crispi (footballer) =

Spanish footballer (born 1948)

Personal information
- Full name: Rafael Alcaide Crespín
- Date of birth: 22 May 1948 (age 78)
- Place of birth: Córdoba, Spain

International career
Years	Team	Apps	(Gls)
- Spain

Rafael Alcaide Crespín (born 22 May 1948), known as Crispi, is a Spanish footballer. He competed in the men's tournament at the 1968 Summer Olympics.
