= Mbarek El Filali =

Moroccan footballer

Personal information
- Full name: Mbarek El Filali
- Date of birth: 12 May 1955
- Place of birth: El Malah, Algeria
- Date of death: 27 November 2021 (aged 66)
- Place of death: Coulounieix-Chamiers, France
- Position: Defender

Senior career*
Years	Team	Apps	(Gls)
–	MC Oujda	–	(–)

International career
1979–1983	Morocco	–	(–)
Medal record
Representing Morocco
Africa Cup of Nations
Third place	1980 Nigeria
- * Club domestic league appearances and goals

Mbarek El Filali (12 May 1955 – 27 November 2021) was a Moroccan footballer who played as a defender for MC Oujda as well as the Moroccan national team.

== Career ==
El Filali won a Botola title with MC Oujda in 1975 as well as 3rd place with the Moroccan national team at the 1980 African Cup of Nations.

El Filali also played with multiple French teams including Périgueux Foot and Trélissac FC.

He was known to the Moroccan public by the nickname "El Filali Sghir" in order to distinguish him from his older brother Mohamed, another footballer who played for Morocco in the 1970 FIFA World Cup.

== Death ==
El Filali died on 27 November 2021 in France, following a long illness. Former players of Trélissac FC and the Moroccan national team met in June 2022 to play in a friendly game in tribute to El Filali.
