= Masahiro Hamazaki =

Japanese footballer (1940–2011)

Masahiro Hamazaki 浜崎 昌弘
Personal information
- Full name: Masahiro Hamazaki
- Date of birth: March 14, 1940
- Place of birth: Osaka, Empire of Japan
- Date of death: October 10, 2011 (aged 71)
- Place of death: Kitakyushu, Fukuoka, Japan
- Height: 1.78 m (5 ft 10 in)
- Position: Goalkeeper

Youth career
- Katsuyama High School
- Meiji University

Senior career*
Years	Team	Apps	(Gls)
????–1972	Nippon Steel	100	(0)
Total		100	(0)

International career
1966	Japan	2	(0)
Medal record
Nippon Steel
Runner-up	Japan Soccer League	1965
Runner-up	Japan Soccer League	1966
Winner	Emperor's Cup	1964
Runner-up	Emperor's Cup	1965
Representing Japan
Olympic Games
Bronze medal – third place	1968 Mexico City	Team
Asian Games
Bronze medal – third place	1966 Bangkok	Team
- * Club domestic league appearances and goals

Masahiro Hamazaki (浜崎 昌弘, Hamazaki Masahiro; March 14, 1940 – October 10, 2011) was a Japanese football player. He played for the Japan national team.

== Club career ==
Hamazaki was born in Osaka Prefecture on March 14, 1940. After graduating from Meiji University, he joined Yawata Steel (later Nippon Steel). The club won the 1964 Emperor's Cup. In 1965, Yawata Steel joined new league Japan Soccer League. He retired in 1972. He played 100 games in the league.

== National team career ==
In December 1966, Hamazaki was selected Japan national team for 1966 Asian Games. At this competition, on December 16, he debuted against Singapore. He played 2 games for Japan in 1966. In October 1968, he was selected Japan for 1968 Summer Olympics in Mexico City. Although he did not play in any match, as he was the team's reserve goalkeeper behind Kenzo Yokoyama, Japan won bronze medal. In 2018, this team was selected for the Japan Football Hall of Fame.

On October 10, 2011, Hamazaki died of ruptured varicose veins of intestines in Kitakyushu at the age of 71.

== National team statistics ==
Japan national team
Year	Apps	Goals
1966	2	0
Total	2	0
