= Miguel Ferreira =

Brazilian footballer (born 1949)

Personal information
- Full name: Miguel Ferreira de Almeida Pereira
- Date of birth: 20 September 1949 (age 77)
- Place of birth: Rio de Janeiro, Brazil
- Position: Centre back

Senior career*
Years	Team	Apps	(Gls)
1967–1971	Olaria		
1971–1975	Vasco da Gama		
1973	→ Bangu (loan)		
1975–1977	Fluminense		
1978	Chicago Sting		
1978–1980	Botafogo		
1980	Unión Magdalena		
1981	Madureira		

International career
- Brazil
- * Club domestic league appearances and goals

Miguel Ferreira de Almeida Pereira (born 20 September 1949) is a Brazilian footballer who played as a defender. He competed in the men's tournament at the 1968 Summer Olympics.
