= Francisco Espíldora =

Spanish footballer

Personal information
- Date of birth: 22 October 1948 (age 78)
- Place of birth: Ceuta, Spain

International career
Years	Team	Apps	(Gls)
- Spain

Francisco Espíldora (born 22 October 1948) is a Spanish footballer. He competed in the men's tournament at the 1968 Summer Olympics.
