= Karima Souid =

Tunisian politician

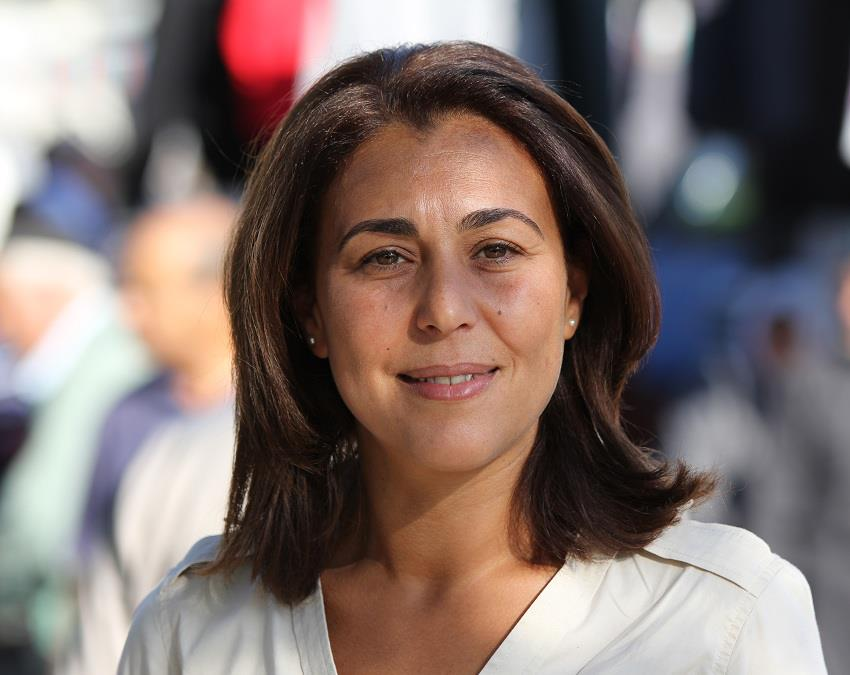

Constituent Assembly of Tunisia

Assembly Member for Second Constituency of France
- In office 22 November 2011 – 2 December 2014
- Parliamentary group: Democratic group

Personal details
- Born: April 4, 1971 (age 55) Lyon, France
- Party: Democratic Forum for Labour and Liberties, independent, Social Democratic Path
- Profession: Senior Project Manager

Karima Souid, born April 4, 1971, in Lyon, is a Tunisian politician, member of the Social Democratic Path.

== Biography ==
Born April 4, 1971, in the 3rd arrondissement of Lyon, she holds a BA in Philosophy and Letters, and follows graduate studies in tourism. She then becomes a Senior Project Manager in a business and event tourism company.

After the 2011 Tunisian revolution, she joins the Democratic Forum for Labour and Liberties (Ettakatol) in February and is elected on 23 October 2011 in the Constituent Assembly of Tunisia as the representative of the Second Constituency of France.

She is appointed as Assessor for Communication, Information, and Media Relations in the Constituent Assembly. As such, she is a member of the Bureau of the Assembly and of the Conference of Presidents.

On February 5, 2013, she resigns from Ettakatol and becomes independent, thus leaving the Troika political coalition. On March 23, she joins the Social Democratic Path known as al-Massar. In 2014, she leaves politics permanently and lives with her family in Lyon.

In 2014, she was awarded with the knight's insignia of the Tunisian Order of Merit.
