= Plínio (footballer, born 1946) =

Brazilian footballer

Personal information
- Full name: José Plínio de Godoy
- Date of birth: 3 February 1946 (age 80)
- Place of birth: São Paulo, Brazil

International career
Years	Team	Apps	(Gls)
- Brazil Olympic

José Plínio de Godoy (born 3 February 1946), known as just Plínio, is a Brazilian footballer. He competed in the men's tournament at the 1968 Summer Olympics.
