= Moreno (footballer, born 1948) =

Brazilian footballer

Personal information
- Full name: Daniel Euclides Moreno
- Date of birth: 18 December 1948 (age 77)
- Place of birth: São Paulo, Brazil
- Height: 1.66 m (5 ft 5 in)
- Position: Forward

Senior career*
Years	Team	Apps	(Gls)
- Palmeiras

International career
- Brazil Olympic
- * Club domestic league appearances and goals

Daniel Euclides Moreno (born 18 December 1948), known as just Moreno, is a Brazilian former footballer who played as a forward. He competed in the men's tournament at the 1968 Summer Olympics.
