= Toninho (footballer, born 1947) =

Brazilian footballer (1947-2022)

Personal information
- Full name: Antônio Pedro de Jesus
- Date of birth: 26 July 1947
- Place of birth: Neves Paulista, Brazil
- Date of death: 18 October 2022 (aged 75)
- Place of death: Rio Preto, Brazil
- Height: 1.76 m (5 ft 9 in)
- Position: Forward

Youth career
- 1961–1968: São Paulo

Senior career*
Years	Team	Apps	(Gls)
1968–1972	São Paulo	64	(1)
1973	Paulista		
1974	São Bento		
1974	América-SP		
1975	Saad		
1975–1976	Desportiva-ES		
1976	Noroeste		
1977	Rio Branco-ES		

International career
1968	Brazil Olympic	8	(0)
- * Club domestic league appearances and goals

Antônio Pedro de Jesus (26 July 1947 – 18 October 2022), known as Toninho, was a Brazilian footballer who played as a forward. He competed in the men's tournament at the 1968 Summer Olympics. Toninho died on 18 October 2022, at the age of 75.

== Honours ==
São Paulo

- Campeonato Paulista: 1970
