= Brendan McCarthy (boxer) =

Irish boxer

Personal information
- Nationality: Irish
- Born: 5 April 1947 (age 78); Dublin, Ireland

Sport
- Sport: Boxing

Brendan McCarthy (born 5 April 1947) is an Irish boxer. He competed in the men's flyweight event at the 1968 Summer Olympics. At the 1968 Summer Olympics, he lost to Ricardo Delgado of Mexico by decision in the Round of 16 after receiving a bye in the Round of 32.
