= César Filardi =

Brazilian swimmer

Personal information
- Full name: César Augusto Filardi
- Born: April 6, 1946 (age 80) São Paulo, São Paulo, Brazil
- Height: 1.83 m (6 ft 0 in)
- Weight: 76 kg (168 lb)

Sport
- Sport: Swimming
- Strokes: Backstroke
Medal record
Men's swimming
Representing Brazil

César Augusto Filardi (born April 6, 1946 in São Paulo) is a former international backstroke swimmer from Brazil, who competed at one Summer Olympics for his native country.

At the 1968 Summer Olympics, in Mexico City, he swam the 100-metre backstroke and the 4×100-metre medley (along with José Fiolo, João Costa Lima Neto and José Aranha), not reaching the finals.
