= José Luis Garzón =

Spanish footballer

Personal information
- Full name: José Luis Garzón Fito
- Date of birth: 4 August 1946
- Place of birth: Valencia, Spain
- Date of death: 17 March 2017 (aged 70)
- Place of death: Barcelona, Spain

International career
Years	Team	Apps	(Gls)
- Spain

José Luis Garzón Fito (4 August 1946 – 17 March 2017) was a Spanish footballer. He competed in the men's tournament at the 1968 Summer Olympics.
