= Cláudio Deodato =

Brazilian footballer (1947–2011)

Personal information
- Full name: Cláudio Norberto Deodato
- Date of birth: 27 August 1947
- Place of birth: São Paulo, Brazil
- Date of death: 11 September 2011 (aged 64)
- Place of death: Rio de Janeiro, Brazil
- Height: 1.70 m (5 ft 7 in)
- Position: Defender

Youth career
- –1966: São Paulo

Senior career*
Years	Team	Apps	(Gls)
1966–1970	São Paulo	88	(0)
1971	Náutico		
1972	Atlético Paranaense		
1972	Vitória		
1973–1974	Atlético Paranaense		
1975–1979	Vitória		

International career
1968	Brazil Olympic	2	(0)
- * Club domestic league appearances and goals

Cláudio Norberto Deodato (27 August 1947 – 11 September 2011) was a Brazilian footballer who played as a defender. He competed in the men's tournament at the 1968 Summer Olympics.

== Honours ==
São Paulo

- Campeonato Paulista: 1970
