= João Almeida (footballer, born 1947) =

Brazilian footballer (born 1947)

Personal information
- Full name: João de Almeida Pereira Filho
- Date of birth: 3 July 1947 (age 79)
- Place of birth: São Paulo, Brazil
- Position: Centre back

Senior career*
Years	Team	Apps	(Gls)
1965–1971	Corinthians		
1969–1970	→ Portuguesa Santista (loan)		
1972	Rio Preto		
1972–1975	Atlético-PR		
1975	Figueirense		
1976	Chapecoense		
1977–1980	Velo Clube		
1980	Amparo		
1980	Primavera		
1980–1982	Cruzeiro-SP		

International career
- Brazil Olympic
- * Club domestic league appearances and goals

João de Almeida Pereira Filho (born 3 July 1947) is a Brazilian footballer. He competed in the men's tournament at the 1968 Summer Olympics.
