= Miguel Ángel Ochoa =

Spanish footballer

Personal information
- Full name: Miguel Ángel Ochoa Vaca
- Date of birth: 29 September 1944 (age 82)
- Place of birth: Badajoz, Spain

Senior career*
Years	Team	Apps	(Gls)
1963–1967	Granollers		
1967–1977	Español	156	(0)

International career
1973	Spain	1	(0)
- * Club domestic league appearances and goals

Miguel Ángel Ochoa (born 29 September 1944) is a Spanish footballer. He competed in the men's tournament at the 1968 Summer Olympics.
