= Raul Marcel =

Brazilian footballer

Personal information
- Full name: Raul Marcel Barreto
- Date of birth: February 6, 1948
- Place of birth: Campinas, Brazil
- Date of death: March 30, 2011 (aged 63)
- Place of death: Montes Claros, Brazil
- Position: Goalkeeper

Youth career
- 1964–1968: Palmeiras

Senior career*
Years	Team	Apps	(Gls)
1969–1974	Palmeiras	13	(0)
1969	→ América (loan)		
1969	→ Noroeste (loan)		
1974–1975	Santa Cruz		
1975	Windsor Stars		
1976–1978	Portuguesa Santista		

International career
1968	Brazil Olympic	4	(0)
- * Club domestic league appearances and goals

Raul Marcel Barreto (September 6, 1948 – March 30, 2011) was a Brazilian footballer who played as a goalkeeper.

== Career ==
Barreto played at the youth level with Palmeiras and joined the first team in 1969. He had loan spells with América Futebol Clube, and Esporte Clube Noroeste. Throughout his tenure with Palmeiras he assisted in securing the Campeonato Brasileiro Série A in 1972, and 1973. He also assisted in winning the Campeonato Paulista in 1972. He played in the 1974 Copa Libertadores against São Paulo FC.

In late 1974 he signed with Santa Cruz Futebol Clube. In 1975, he played abroad in the National Soccer League with Windsor Stars. In 1976, he returned to Brazil to play with Portuguesa Santista.

He died on March 30, 2011, from a cerebral aneurysm.

== International career ==
Barreto was selected to represent Brazil in the 1968 Summer Olympics.
