= Anthony Igwe =

Nigerian footballer

Personal information
- Date of birth: 24 December 1945 (age 80)
- Place of birth: Barkin Ladi, Nigeria

College career
Years	Team	Apps	(Gls)
1975–1978	San Francisco Dons		

International career
1968-1974	Nigeria	40	(3)

Anthony “World Number Two” Igwe (born 24 December 1945) is a Nigerian footballer. He competed in the men's tournament at the 1968 Summer Olympics.

In 1975, Igwe moved to the United States to pursue a degree in Kinesiology from the University of San Francisco. There, he played three seasons for the San Francisco Dons men's soccer program.
