= Prapan Duangchaoom =

Thai boxer (born 1944)

Prapan Duangchaoom (Thai: ประพันธ์ ด้วงชะอุ่ม; RTGS: Praphan Duangcha-um; born 22 October 1944) is a Thai former boxer who competed in the 1968 Summer Olympics.
