= Augustine Ofuokwu =

Nigerian footballer

Personal information
- Date of birth: 14 August 1944
- Place of birth: Jos, Nigeria
- Date of death: 5 July 2004 (aged 59)
- Place of death: Lagos, Nigeria

International career
Years	Team	Apps	(Gls)
- Nigeria

Augustine "Mazeli" Ofuokwu (14 August 1944 – 5 July 2004) was a Nigerian footballer. He competed in the men's tournament at the 1968 Summer Olympics.

Early Life

Personal Life

Career
