= Servílio de Oliveira =

Brazilian boxer (born 1948)

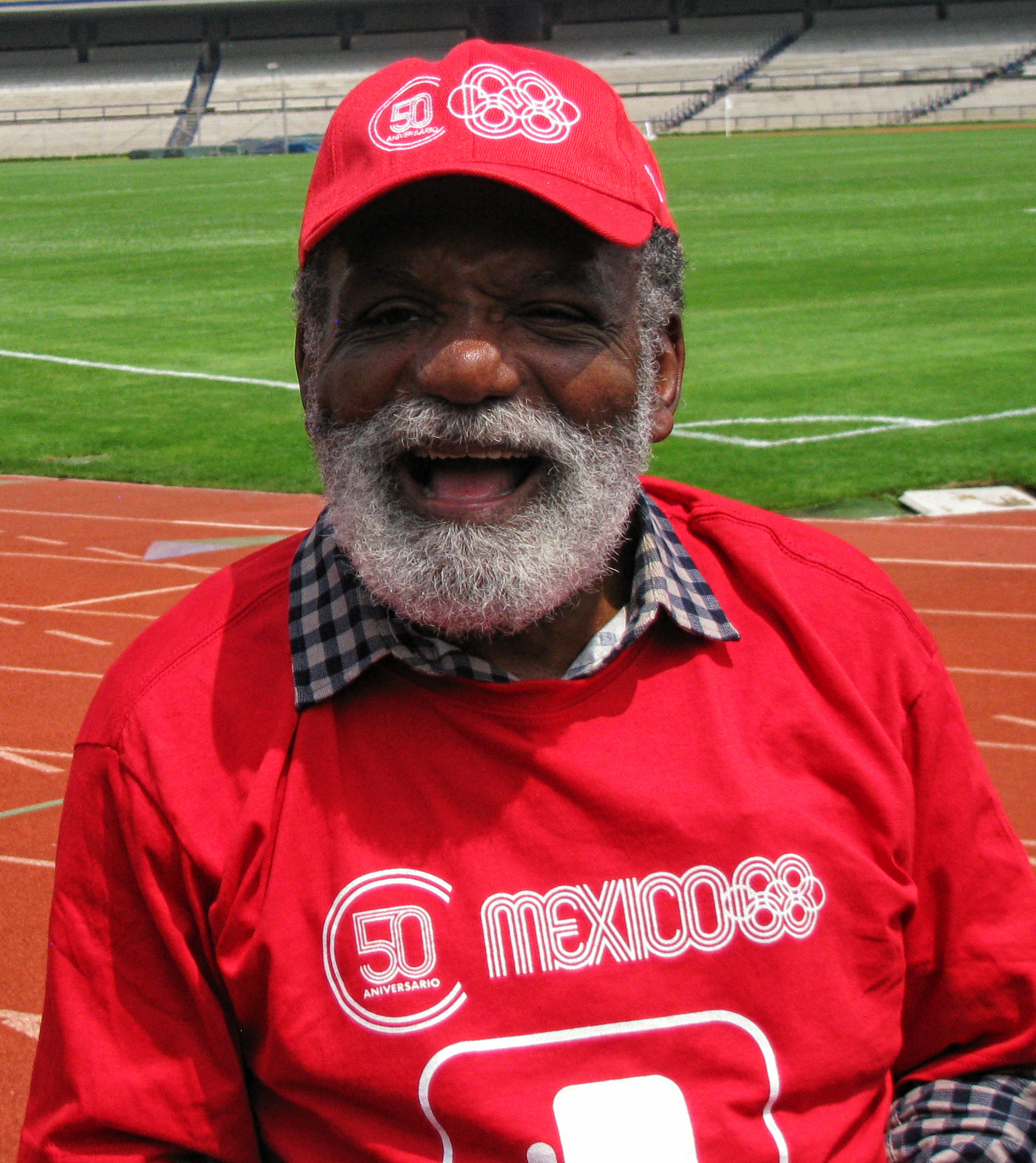
- Oliveira in Mexico City, 2018

Personal information
- Born: May 6, 1948 (age 78) São Paulo, Brazil
- Height: 1.59 m (5 ft 3 in)
- Weight: Flyweight

Boxing career

Boxing record
- Total fights: 19
- Wins: 19
- Win by KO: 9
Medal record
Men's amateur boxing
Representing Brazil
Olympic Games
Bronze medal – third place	1968 Mexico City	Flyweight

Servílio Sebastião de Oliveira (born May 6, 1948 in São Paulo) is a former Brazilian Olympic bronze medalist . In 1968, he became the first Brazilian boxer ever to win an Olympic medal. It occurred at the 1968 Summer Olympics in Mexico City. An eye injury forced his retirement from professional boxing. He made a comeback and won two bouts in 1977, then re-retired with a record of 19–0.

== Boxing trainer ==
He became a boxing trainer for other Brazilian boxers such as Adailton "Precipício" de Jesus and IBF Featherweight Champion Valdemir Pereira.

== Exhibitions ==
Oliveira has occasionally come out of retirement to fight exhibitions. The best known of these was the three round exhibition he fought in 1996 with Éder Jofre.

== Personal life ==
Oliveira's son Gabriel is the boxing coach of the American Top Team.

== Professional boxing record ==
19 fights	19 wins	0 losses
By knockout	9	0
By decision	10	0

No.	Result	Record	Opponent	Type	Round, time	Date	Location	Notes
19	Win	19–0	(Uruguay) Gilberto Lopez	UD	10	25 November 1977	Ginásio do Pacaembu, São Paulo, São Paulo, Brazil	
18	Win	18–0	(Argentina) Felix Gonzalez	UD	10	29 July 1977	Ginásio do Pacaembu, São Paulo, São Paulo, Brazil	
17	Win	17–0	(Argentina) Rodolfo Rodriguez	MD	10	3 June 1977	Ginásio do Pacaembu, São Paulo, São Paulo, Brazil	
16	Win	16–0	(Brazil) Gilton Salomao	TD	10	2 July 1976	Ginásio Estadual do Ibirapuera, São Paulo, São Paulo, Brazil	
15	Win	15–0	(United States) Tony Moreno	UD	10	3 December 1971	Ginásio Estadual do Ibirapuera, São Paulo, São Paulo, Brazil	Moreno was disqualified for headbutting Oliveira; the resulting retinal detachment forced Oliveira into retirement
14	Win	14–0	(Italy) Franco Sperati	RTD	10	17 September 1971	Ginásio Estadual do Ibirapuera, São Paulo, São Paulo, Brazil	
13	Win	13–0	(Mexico) Jose Cruz Garcia	PTS	10	17 September 1971	Ginásio Estadual do Ibirapuera, São Paulo, São Paulo, Brazil	
12	Win	12–0	(France) Jean-Claude Lapinte	PTS	10	23 July 1971	Ginásio Estadual do Ibirapuera, São Paulo, São Paulo, Brazil	
11	Win	11–0	(Chile) Mario Figueroa	KO	5 (10)	18 June 1971	Ginásio Estadual do Ibirapuera, São Paulo, São Paulo, Brazil	
10	Win	10–0	(Argentina) Santos Silva	KO	8 (10)	23 April 1971	Ginásio do Corinthians, São Paulo, São Paulo, Brazil	
9	Win	9–0	(Ecuador) Angel Sanchez	KO	7 (12)	18 December 1970	Guayaquil, Ecuador	Won the vacant South American Flyweight title.
8	Win	8–0	(Uruguay) Nelson Enrique	UD	3 (10)	4 July 1970	Ginásio da A.D.C. Pirelli, Santo André, São Paulo, Brazil	
7	Win	7–0	(Argentina) Osvaldo Maldonado	UD	12	19 May 1970	Ginásio da A.D.C. Pirelli, Santo André, São Paulo, Brazil	
6	Win	6–0	(Brazil) Jorge Pereira	KO	6 (10)	9 April 1970	Auditório da TV-Excelsior, São Paulo, São Paulo, Brazil	
5	Win	5–0	(Brazil) Antonio Barbosa	TD	12	19 February 1970	Auditório da TV-Excelsior, São Paulo, São Paulo, Brazil	Won the vacant Brazilian Flyweight title.
4	Win	4–0	(Brazil) Laerson Silva	RTD	3 (10)	24 December 1969	Auditório da TV-Excelsior, São Paulo, São Paulo, Brazil	
3	Win	3–0	(Brazil) Jose Matias	KO	4 (4)	14 November 1969	Ginásio do Ibirapuera, São Paulo, São Paulo, Brazil	
2	Win	2–0	(Brazil) Ezau Teixeira	KO	2 (4)	27 August 1969	Ginásio do Ibirapuera, São Paulo, São Paulo, Brazil	
1	Win	1–0	(Brazil) Jossue Suares	PTS	4 (4)	5 July 1969	São Paulo, Brazil	
