= Mabrouka Mbarek =

Tunisian academic and politician

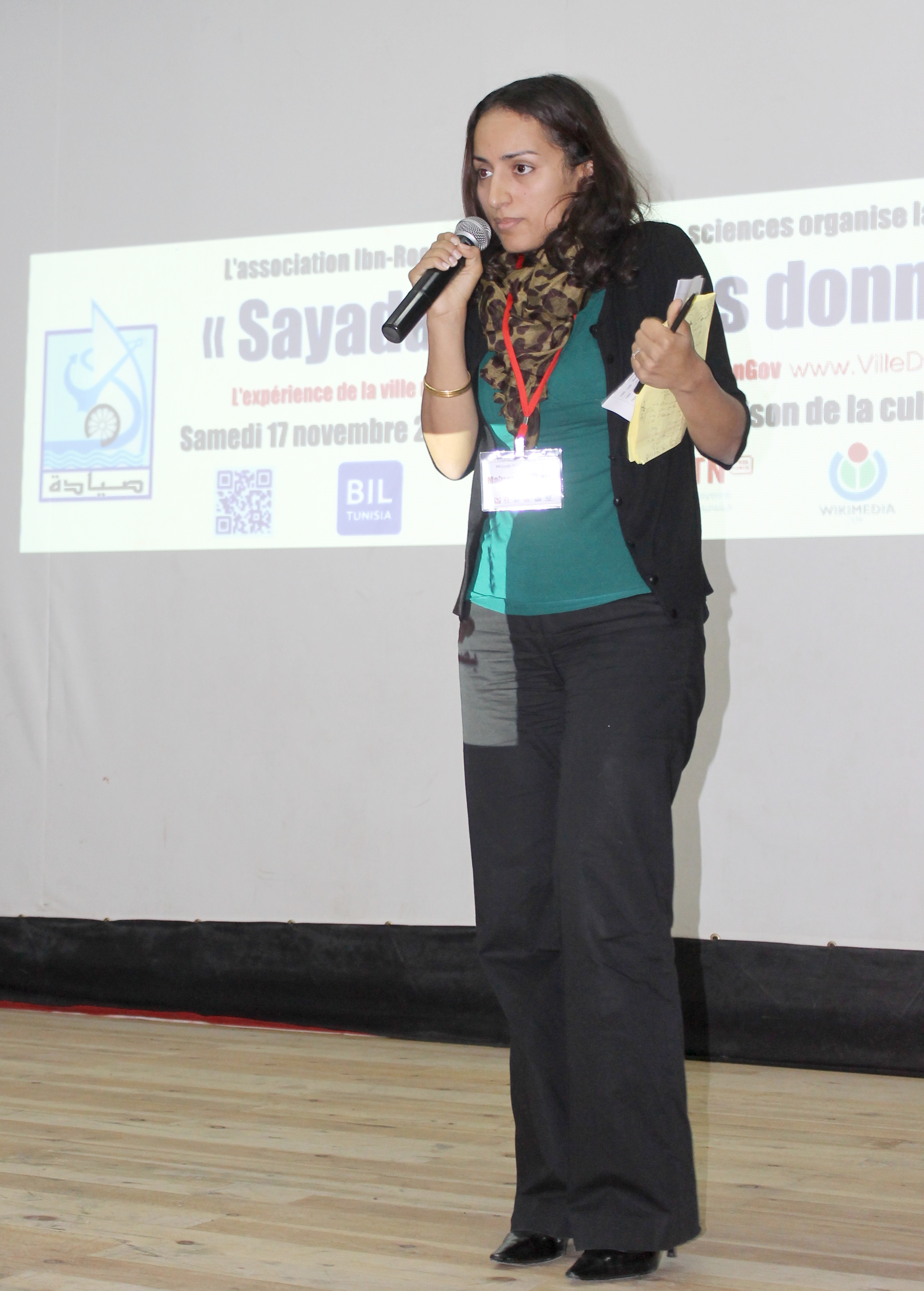
Mbarek in 2012

Mabrouka Mbarek (born 31 May 1980) is a Tunisian academic and politician who was a member of the Constituent Assembly of Tunisia.

== Early life and education ==
Mbarek was born in Strasbourg on 31 May 1980 to Tunisian parents who had emigrated from Bir Ali Ben Khélifa in the 1970s. She has a Masters in Economic and Social Administration from the University of Strasbourg and an MBA from the Reims Management School.

== Career ==
Mbarek undertook an internship at the French Embassy in Sana'a. She then worked as an auditor in Berkeley, United States, before working for an American NGO in the middle east.

After the Tunisian Revolution, Mbarek joined the Congress for the Republic in Montreal and was elected to the National Constituent Assembly representing the constituency of the Americas and Europe (except France, Italy and Germany). She was a member of the Committees on Internal Rules and Immunity, Finance, Planning and Development, and the Constitutional Draft Committee. She also advised President Moncef Marzouki on issues of debt and transparency. In 2012, Mbarek tabled a bill calling on Tunisia to repay debts contracted under the previous dictatorship as part of the democratic transition. She was responsible for the creation of an open government initiative called the CopenGovTN taskforce, which advocates for a more participatory government, the rebuilding of a democratic model, and universal human rights.

After completing her parliamentary term in 2014, Mbarek became a researcher at the Middle East Institute, focusing on monetary and fiscal policies in the post-revolutionary context.

In 2014, Mbarek was named one of Harvard Law School's "Women Inspiring Change." In 2016, she taught a course on Tunisia and the Arab Spring at Middlebury College. She has written opinion pieces for Tunisia Live, and CNN.
