= Fernando Ortuño =

Spanish footballer

Personal information
- Full name: Fernando Ortuño Blasco
- Date of birth: 12 October 1945
- Place of birth: Granollers, Spain
- Date of death: 13 July 2015 (aged 70)

International career
Years	Team	Apps	(Gls)
- Spain

Fernando Ortuño Blasco (12 October 1945 – 13 July 2015) was a Spanish footballer. He competed in the men's tournament at the 1968 Summer Olympics.
