= Joseph Aghoghovbia =

Nigerian footballer (1941–2010)

Personal information
- Full name: Peter Joseph Aghoghovbia
- Date of birth: 15 April 1941
- Place of birth: Nigeria
- Date of death: 19 July 2010 (aged 69)
- Place of death: Benin City, Nigeria
- Position: Centre forward

International career
Years	Team	Apps	(Gls)
1968	Nigeria Olympic team	1	(0)
1968	Nigeria	2	(1)

Peter Joseph Aghoghovbia (15 April 1941 – 19 July 2010) was a Nigerian international footballer. He played as a centre forward.

== Career ==
Aghoghovbia earned two caps for Nigeria in December 1968, having previously participated at the 1968 Summer Olympics.
