= Muwiya Oshode =

Nigerian footballer

Personal information
- Date of birth: 8 June 1946 (age 80)
- Place of birth: Lagos, Nigeria

International career
| Years | Team | Apps | (Gls) |
- Nigeria

Ulumuwiya "Muwiya" Oshode, also known by his nickname Lucky Boy (born 8 June 1946) is a Nigerian footballer. He competed in the men's tournament at the 1968 Summer Olympics.
