= Nikolay Novikov (boxer) =

Russian boxer

Personal information
- Nationality: Russian
- Born: 15 May 1946 (age 78); Tula, Soviet Union
- Died: 25 February 2014

Sport
- Sport: Boxing

Nikolay Novikov (born 15 May 1946) was a Russian boxer. He competed in the men's flyweight event at the 1968 Summer Olympics.
