= Getúlio (footballer, born 1947) =

Brazilian footballer (1947–2008)

Personal information
- Full name: Getúlio Pedro da Cruz
- Date of birth: 14 February 1947
- Place of birth: Matão, Brazil
- Date of death: 4 April 2008 (aged 61)
- Place of death: Araraquara, Brazil
- Height: 1.72 m (5 ft 8 in)
- Position: Goalkeeper

Senior career*
Years	Team	Apps	(Gls)
1967–1970	Ferroviária	44	(0)
1970–1971	América-SP		
1973	Comercial-SP		
1974	São Paulo	6	(0)
1975–1980	XV de Piracicaba		

International career
1968	Brazil Olympic		
- * Club domestic league appearances and goals

Getúlio Pedro da Cruz (14 February 1947 – 4 April 2008), known as just Getúlio, was a Brazilian footballer who played as a goalkeeper for Ferroviária. He competed in the men's tournament at the 1968 Summer Olympics.
