= Jorge (footballer, born 1946) =

Brazilian footballer (1946–2018)

Personal information
- Full name: Jorge Alves da Silva
- Date of birth: 23 February 1946
- Place of birth: São Paulo, Brazil
- Date of death: 16 November 2018 (aged 72)

International career
Years	Team	Apps	(Gls)
- Brazil Olympic

Jorge Alves da Silva (23 February 1946 – 16 November 2018), known as just Jorge, was a Brazilian footballer. He competed in the men's tournament at the 1968 Summer Olympics. Jorge died on 16 November 2018, at the age of 72.
