= Sam Garba =

Nigerian footballer (1947–1978)

Personal information
- Full name: Sam Garba Okoye
- Date of birth: 22 December 1947
- Place of birth: Nigeria
- Date of death: 31 July 1978 (aged 30)
- Position: Attacking midfielder

Senior career*
Years	Team	Apps	(Gls)
1963–1974	Mighty Jets F.C.		

International career
1965–1973	Nigeria	17	(5)

Managerial career
- 1974–1978: Plateau State Sports Council
- * Club domestic league appearances and goals

Sam Garba Okoye (22 December 1947 – 31 July 1978) was a Nigerian footballer who played as a forward for the Nigerian national football team. He also represented Nigeria at the 1968 Summer Olympics in Mexico.

== Club career ==
Okoye started his career at Eleven Rangers of Jos, where he won the Jos Amateur Football Association (JAFA) Cup against Sea Never Dry. He went on to sign for Federal United before joining Mighty Jets F.C.

Okoye played for Mighty Jets F.C. for 11 years, from 1963 until 1974 when he retired to become a manager. While there, he reached 8 Nigeria Federation Cup finals, losing all. In 1966, Okoye of Igbo extraction fled with some teammates to Lagos following the 1966 anti-Igbo pogrom that led to the Nigerian Civil War. They could not produce a full team for the Nigeria Federation Cup final against Ibadan Lions, as some of their teammates wouldn't flee out of fear. The victory was awarded to Ibadan Lions by walk-over.

In the 1972 Nigeria Federation Cup final against Bendel Insurance, Okoye scored a late brace to bring his team back from 2-0 down with 5 minutes to play, forcing a replay. The second goal was lauded because he dribbled past several players before scoring. They lost the replay 3-2.

He won the Nigeria Premier Football League in 1972.

== International career ==
On 30 August 1965, Okoye made his debut for Nigeria aged 17, in a game against Gabon which ended in a 4-1 win. The following year, he was part of the Nigerian team that won for the first time in Accra against Ghana. It ended 1-0.

On 30 October 1968, Okoye became the first Nigerian player to score in an international tournament outside Africa when he scored Nigeria's only goal in their Olympics opener against Japan.

Okoye played 17 times for Nigeria National Football Team in total, scoring 5 times. His last international game came in 1971 against Senegal, which Nigeria lost 2-1. The defeat meant that the team failed to qualify for the 1972 Olympics.

== Style ==
Okoye was known for tying a white handkerchief on his head while playing, which made it easy for him to be noticed on the pitch.

== Personal life ==
He lived in Masallacin Juma street in Jos with his wife, Veronica.

== Death ==
On 13 July 1978, while travelling along Lafia-Akwanga road in Nasarawa State, Garba was involved in a fatal car accident.

== Honours ==
Mighty Jets F.C.

- Nigerian Premier League: 1972
- Nigeria Federation Cup runner-up: 1963, 1964, 1965, 1966, 1967, 1970, 1972, 1974
