= Engin Yadigar =

Turkish boxer

Personal information
- Nationality: Turkish
- Born: 12 June 1944 (age 81); Istanbul, Turkey

Sport
- Sport: Boxing

Engin Yadigar (born 12 June 1944) is a Turkish boxer. He competed in the men's flyweight event at the 1968 Summer Olympics.
