= Tião (footballer, born 1948) =

Brazilian footballer

Personal information
- Full name: Sebastião Carlos da Silva
- Date of birth: 8 March 1948 (age 78)
- Place of birth: Vitória, Brazil

International career
Years	Team	Apps	(Gls)
- Brazil Olympic

Sebastião Carlos da Silva (born 8 March 1948), known as just Tião, is a Brazilian footballer. He competed in the men's tournament at the 1968 Summer Olympics.
