= Peter Anieke =

Nigerian footballer

Personal information
- Full name: Peter Anieke
- Date of birth: 2 March 1946
- Place of birth: Jos, Nigeria
- Date of death: 20 April 2015 (aged 69)
- Place of death: Nigeria
- Height: 1.80 m (5 ft 11 in)
- Position: Midfielder

Senior career*
Years	Team	Apps	(Gls)
1965–1966	Plateau United		
1967–1970	Stationery Stores		
1970–1973	Lagos ECN		

International career
1968	Nigeria Olympic team		
1965–1973	Nigeria	30	(5)
- * Club domestic league appearances and goals

Peter Anieke (2 March 1946 – 20 April 2015) was a Nigerian international footballer. He played as a midfielder.

== Career ==
Anieke grew up in Jos where he played football for St Mulumba's College. In 1965, he joined Plateau United, and after the Challenge Cup final against ECN Football Club (Now PHCN) in Lagos, Adebajo, a stationery stores owner, became interested in signing him. In 1967, he joined them and won the Challenge Cup with Stationary Stores Football Club in 1967 and 1968. His goal-scoring exploits earned him the nickname ‘Eusebio of Africa’.
