= Samuel Opone =

Nigerian footballer

Personal information
- Date of birth: 13 June 1942
- Place of birth: Sapele, Delta state, Nigeria
- Date of death: November 2000

International career
| Years | Team | Apps | (Gls) |
- Nigeria

Samuel Opone (13 June 1942 – November 2000) was a Nigerian footballer. He competed in the men's tournament at the 1968 Summer Olympics.
