= Tetsuaki Nakamura =

Japanese boxer

Personal information
- Nationality: Japanese
- Born: 1 October 1948 (age 77) Ōita, Japan

Sport
- Sport: Boxing

Tetsuaki Nakamura (中村 哲明, Nakamura Tetsuaki; born 1 October 1948) is a Japanese boxer. He competed in the men's flyweight event at the 1968 Summer Olympics.
