= Segun Olumodeji =

Nigerian footballer (born 1945)

Personal information
- Date of birth: 1 April 1945 (age 81)
- Place of birth: Zaria, Nigeria

International career
Years	Team	Apps	(Gls)
- Nigeria

Olesegun Olumodeji (born 1 April 1945) is a Nigerian footballer. He competed in the men's tournament at the 1968 Summer Olympics.
