= Fernando Ferretti =

Brazilian footballer (1949-2011)

Personal information
- Date of birth: 26 April 1949
- Place of birth: Rio de Janeiro, Brazil
- Date of death: 29 August 2011 (aged 62)
- Height: 1.88 m (6 ft 2 in)
- Position: Forward

Senior career*
Years	Team	Apps	(Gls)
1966–1971	Botafogo		
1971	Santos		
1972	Vasco da Gama		
1972	Fluminense		
1973–1975	Botafogo		
1975	Alagoano		
1976	Vitória		
1977	Ceará		
1978	Atlético		

International career
1968	Brazil Olympic	3	(2)
- * Club domestic league appearances and goals

Fernando Ferretti (26 April 1949 – 29 August 2011) was a former Brazilian association football striker who mainly played for Botafogo.

== Olympic career ==
Ferretti featured in all three matches of the Brazilian (under-23) Olympic football team of Brazil at the 1968 Olympic Games, and became the Brazilian top scorer with two goals. In the 55th minute of the last group match against Nigeria, he was sent off.
