= Kenneth Olayombo =

Nigerian footballer

Personal information
- Full name: Kenneth Olayombo
- Date of birth: 29 August 1947
- Place of birth: Calabar, Nigeria Protectorate
- Date of death: 3 July 2013 (aged 65)
- Height: 1.73 m (5 ft 8 in)
- Position: Forward

Senior career*
Years	Team	Apps	(Gls)
1968	Lagos Garrison Organisation		

International career
1968	Nigeria U23	2	(2)
1968–1980	Nigeria	33	(12)
- * Club domestic league appearances and goals

Kenneth Olayombo (29 August 1947 – 3 July 2013) was a Nigeria international football forward.

== Career ==
Born in Calabar, Olayombo began playing club football for local side Nigerian Army F.C. Olayombo represented Nigeria at the 1968 Summer Olympics in Mexico City. He also made several appearances for the senior Nigeria national team, including five FIFA World Cup qualifying matches. He played at the 1976 African Cup of Nations finals.
