= Football at the 1968 Summer Olympics – Group A =

Football at the Summer Olympics group

Group A of the 1968 Summer Olympics football tournament took place from 13 to 17 October 1968. The group consisted of host nation Mexico, as well as Colombia, France and Guinea. The top two teams, France and Mexico, advanced to the quarter-finals.

== Teams ==
Team	Region	Method of qualification	Date of qualification	Finals appearance	Last appearance	Previous best performance							
Team	Region	Method of qualification	Date of qualification	Finals appearance	Last appearance	Previous best performance	Mexico	North America	Hosts	18 October 1963	4th	1964	First round (1928, 1948, 1964)
Colombia	South America	CONMEBOL final group runners-up	9 April 1968	1st	—	—							
France	Europe	Europe Group 3 winners	12 May 1968	9th	1960	Silver medal (1900)							
Guinea	Africa	Europe Group 1 winners	30 June 1968	1st	—	—							

== Standings ==
Pos	Team	Pld	W	D	L	GF	GA	GD	Pts	Qualification
1	France	3	2	0	1	8	4	+4	4	Advance to knockout stage
2	Mexico (H)	3	2	0	1	6	4	+2	4	Advance to knockout stage
3	Colombia	3	1	0	2	4	5	−1	2	
4	Guinea	3	1	0	2	4	9	−5	2	

Source: FIFA
(H) Hosts

In the quarter-finals:

- The winners of Group A, France, advanced to play the runners-up of Group B, Japan.
- The runners-up of Group A, Mexico, advanced to play the winners of Group B, Spain.

== Matches ==
=== Mexico vs Colombia ===
13 October 1968
12:00

Mexico	1–0	Colombia
Estrada 6'	Report

Estadio Azteca, Mexico City
Referee: István Zsolt (Hungary)

1	Javier Vargas
2	Juan Manuel Alejándrez
3	Humberto Medina
4	Héctor Sanabria
5	Mario Pérez
6	Luis Regueiro
7	Héctor Pulido	(substituted off) 70'
8	Fernando Bustos
9	Luis Estrada
10	Vicente Pereda
11	Cesáreo Victorino
Substitutions:
12	Jesús Mendoza
13	Jesús Mendoza Rivas
15	Elías Muñoz
16	Juan Ignacio Basaguren	(substituted on) 70'
18	Albino Morales
Manager:
(Mexico) Ignacio Trelles

1	Otoniel Quintana
2	Gabriel Hernández
3	Luis Soto
4	Oscar Muñoz
5	Decio López
6	Joaquín Pardo
8	Germán González
9	Alfredo Arango	(substituted off) 64'
10	Norman Ortíz
11	Gustavo Santa
14	Gabriel Berdugo
Substitutions:
12	Ramiro Viáfara
13	Alberto Escobar
15	Javier Tamayo	(substituted on) 64'
16	Alfonso Jaramillo
17	Fabio Mosquera
Manager:
(Colombia) Edgar Barona

Assistant referees:
Dimitar Rumentchev (Bulgaria)
George Lamptey (Ghana)

=== France vs Guinea ===
13 October 1968
12:00

France	3–1	Guinea
Hallet 61'; Horlaville 64'; Périgaud 70'	Report	Camara 79'

Estadio Cuauhtémoc, Puebla
Referee: Milivoje Gugulovic (Yugoslavia)

19	Henri Ribul
4	Jean Lempereur
5	Freddy Zix
6	Michel Verhoeve
7	Gilbert Planté
9	Jean-Michel Larqué
11	Jean-Louis Hodoul
12	Daniel Périgaud
14	Daniel Horlaville
15	Marc-Kanyan Case	(substituted off) 74'
18	Gérard Hallet
Substitutions:
1	Guy Delhumeau
3	Bernard Goueffic
8	Michel Delafosse
10	Alain Laurier
16	Charles Teamboueon	(substituted on) 74'
Manager:
(France) André Grillon

1	Morlaye Camara
2	Pierre Bangoura
3	Ibrahima Fofana
4	Sékou Condé
5	Amadou Sankon
7	Maxime Camara	(substituted off) 74'
8	Ibrahima Kandia Diallo
10	Chérif Souleymane
11	N'Dongo Camara
14	Petit Sory
18	Soriba Soumah
Substitutions:
19	Mamadi Sano
9	Fodé Bouya Camara	(substituted on) 74'
12	Samuel Smith
13	Jacob Bangoura
17	Morciré Sylla
Manager:
(Guinea) Naby Camara

Assistant referees:
Seyoum Tarekegn (Ethiopia)
Karol Galba (Slovakia)

=== France vs Mexico ===
15 October 1968
15:30

France	4–1	Mexico
Case 20', 69'; Teamboueon 30'; Medina 36' (o.g.)	Report	Victorino 26'

Estadio Azteca, Mexico City
Referee: Erwin Hieger (Peru)

19	Henri Ribul
4	Jean Lempereur
5	Freddy Zix
6	Michel Verhoeve
7	Gilbert Planté
9	Jean-Michel Larqué
11	Jean-Louis Hodoul
14	Daniel Horlaville
15	Marc-Kanyan Case
16	Charles Teamboueon
18	Gérard Hallet
Substitutions:
1	Guy Delhumeau
3	Bernard Goueffic
8	Michel Delafosse
10	Alain Laurier
17	Michel Parmentier
Manager:
(France) André Grillon

1	Javier Vargas
2	Juan Manuel Alejándrez
3	Humberto Medina
4	Héctor Sanabria
5	Mario Pérez
6	Luis Regueiro
7	Héctor Pulido
8	Fernando Bustos
9	Luis Estrada	(substituted off) 37'
10	Vicente Pereda
11	Cesáreo Victorino
Substitutions:
12	Jesús Mendoza
13	Jesús Mendoza Rivas
15	Elías Muñoz	(substituted on) 37'
16	Juan Ignacio Basaguren
18	Albino Morales
Manager:
(Mexico) Ignacio Trelles

Assistant referees:
Karol Galba (Slovakia)
Milivoje Gugulović (Serbia)

=== Guinea vs Colombia ===
15 October 1968
15:30

Guinea	3–2	Colombia
M. Camara 26'; F. Camara 58', 84'	Report	Santa 49'; Mosquera 66'

Estadio Cuauhtémoc, Puebla
Referee: Dimitar Rumenchev (Bulgaria)

19	Mamadi Sano	(substituted off) 87'
2	Pierre Bangoura
3	Ibrahima Fofana
4	Sékou Condé
5	Amadou Sankon
6	Mamadouba Soumah
7	Maxime Camara
9	Fodé Bouya Camara
10	Chérif Souleymane
11	N'Dongo Camara
14	Petit Sory
Substitutions:
1	Morlaye Camara	(substituted on) 87'
12	Samuel Smith
13	Jacob Bangoura
16	Ali Badara Dia
17	Morciré Sylla
Manager:
(Guinea) Naby Camara

1	Otoniel Quintana
2	Gabriel Hernández
3	Luis Soto
4	Oscar Muñoz
5	Decio López
8	Germán González	(substituted off) 62'
9	Alfredo Arango
10	Norman Ortíz
11	Gustavo Santa
14	Gabriel Berdugo
17	Fabio Mosquera
Substitutions:
6	Joaquín Pardo	(substituted on) 62'
12	Ramiro Viáfara
13	Alberto Escobar
16	Alfonso Jaramillo
18	Soriba Soumah
Manager:
(Colombia) Edgar Barona

Assistant referees:
István Zsolt (Hungary)
Abraham Klein (Israel)

=== Mexico vs Guinea ===
17 October 1968
15:30

Mexico	4–0	Guinea
Pereda 70', 85'; Pulido 86', 88'	Report

Estadio Azteca, Mexico City
Referee: Suvaree Wanchai (Thailand)

1	Javier Vargas
2	Juan Manuel Alejándrez
3	Humberto Medina
4	Héctor Sanabria
5	Mario Pérez
6	Luis Regueiro
7	Héctor Pulido
8	Fernando Bustos	(substituted off) 35'
9	Luis Estrada	(substituted off) 35'
10	Vicente Pereda
11	Cesáreo Victorino
Substitutions:
12	Jesús Mendoza
13	Jesús Mendoza Rivas
15	Elías Muñoz	(substituted on) 35'
16	Juan Ignacio Basaguren
18	Albino Morales	(substituted on) 35'
Manager:
(Mexico) Ignacio Trelles

19	Mamadi Sano
2	Pierre Bangoura
3	Ibrahima Fofana
4	Sékou Condé	(yellow card) 30'
5	Amadou Sankon
6	Mamadouba Soumah		(substituted off) 45+1'
7	Maxime Camara
9	Fodé Bouya Camara		(substituted off) 69'
10	Chérif Souleymane
11	N'Dongo Camara
14	Petit Sory	(red card) 72'
Substitutions:
1	Morlaye Camara
8	Ibrahima Kandia Diallo		(substituted on) 69'
12	Samuel Smith
13	Jacob Bangoura
16	Ali Badara Dia		(substituted on) 45+1'
Manager:
(Guinea) Naby Camara

Assistant referees:
Augusto Robles (Guatemala)
George Lamptey (Ghana)

=== Colombia vs France ===
17 October 1968
15:30

Colombia	2–1	France
Tamayo 14'; Jaramillo 35'	Report	Teamboueon 59'

Estadio Cuauhtémoc, Puebla
Referee: Karol Galba (Czechoslovakia)

1	Otoniel Quintana
2	Gabriel Hernández	Booked
3	Luis Soto
6	Joaquín Pardo
7	Pedro Ospina
12	Ramiro Viáfara
13	Alberto Escobar
14	Gabriel Berdugo
15	Javier Tamayo		(substituted off) 33'
16	Alfonso Jaramillo		(substituted off) 45+1'
17	Fabio Mosquera
Substitutions:
5	Decio López
8	Germán González
9	Alfredo Arango		(substituted on) 45+1'
10	Norman Ortíz		(substituted on) 33'
18	Alberto Sánchez
Manager:
(Colombia) Edgar Barona

1	Guy Delhumeau
2	Dario Grava
3	Bernard Goueffic
7	Gilbert Planté
8	Michel Delafosse
10	Alain Laurier	(substituted off) 45+1'
11	Jean-Louis Hodoul
14	Daniel Horlaville
15	Marc-Kanyan Case
16	Charles Teamboueon
17	Michel Parmentier	(substituted off) 49'
Substitutions:
19	Henri Ribul
4	Jean Lempereur
5	Freddy Zix
9	Jean-Michel Larqué	(substituted on) 45+1'
18	Gérard Hallet	(substituted on) 49'
Manager:
(France) André Grillon

Assistant referees:
Dimitar Rumentchev (Bulgaria)
Milivoje Gugulović (Serbia)

== See also ==
- France at the Olympics
- Mexico at the Olympics
- Colombia at the Olympics
- Guinea at the Olympics
