= Colombia at the 1968 Summer Olympics =

- IOC code: COL
- NOC: Colombian Olympic Committee

in Mexico City
- Competitors: 43 (38 men, 5 women) in 5 sports
- Flag bearer: Ricardo González
- Medals: Gold 0 Silver 0 Bronze 0 Total 0

Summer Olympics appearances (overview)
- 1932; 1936; 1948; 1952; 1956; 1960; 1964; 1968; 1972; 1976; 1980; 1984; 1988; 1992; 1996; 2000; 2004; 2008; 2012; 2016; 2020; 2024; 2028

Colombia competed at the 1968 Summer Olympics in Mexico City, Mexico. 43 competitors, 38 men and 5 women, took part in 33 events in 5 sports. They did not win any medals.

== Athletics ==
Men's 100 metres

- Jimmy Sierra
  - Round 1 — 10.8 s (→ 7th in heat, did not advance)

Men's 200 metres

- Pedro Grajales
  - Round 1 — 21.0 s (→ 4th in heat, did not advance)

Men's 400 metres

- Pedro Grajales
  - Round 1 — 46.7 s (→ 2nd in heat, advanced to round 2)
  - Round 2 — 46.5 s (→ 8th in heat, did not advance)

Men's 10,000 metres

- Álvaro Mejía — 30:10.6 min (→ 10th place)

Men's 10,000 metres

- Hernán Barreneche — DNS (→ no ranking)

Men's 110 metres hurdles

- Hernando Arrechea
  - Round 1 — 14.0 s (→ 5th in heat, did not advance)

== Cycling ==
Ten cyclists represented Colombia in 1968.

1000m time trial

- Jorge Hernández — 1:09.24 min (→ 25th place)

Sprint

- Jaime Galeano
  - Round 1 — 2nd in heat (→ advanced to repechage)
  - Repechage — 3rd in heat (→ did not advance)
- Héctor Urrego
  - Round 1 — 2nd in heat (→ advanced to repechage)
  - Repechage — 3rd in heat (→ did not advance)

Individual pursuit

- Martín Rodríguez
  - Qualification — 4:45.38 min (→ 9th in trial, did not advance)

Team pursuit

- Luis Saldarriaga, Mario Vanegas, Severo Hernández, Martín Rodríguez
  - Qualification — 4:31.98 min (→ did not advance)

Individual road race

- Martín Rodríguez — 4:43:58.49 hrs (→ 9th place)
- Álvaro Pachón — 4:44:13.10 hrs (→ 15th place)
- Pedro Sánchez — 4:46:37.94 hrs (→ 30th place)
- Miguel Samaca — DNF (→ no ranking)

== Diving ==
Men

Athlete	Event	Preliminary		Final			
Athlete	Event	Points	Rank	Points	Rank	Total	Rank
Salim Barjum	3 m springboard	76.19	24	Did not advance			
Diego Henao	10 m platform	74.09	32	Did not advance			

Women

Athlete	Event	Preliminary		Final			
Athlete	Event	Points	Rank	Points	Rank	Total	Rank
Martha Manzano	3 m springboard	63.12	22	Did not advance			

== Football ==
Men's team competition

- Preliminary round (Group A)
  - Colombia – Mexico 0-1
  - Colombia – Guinea 2-3
  - Colombia – France 2-1
  - → 3rd in group, did not advance
- Team roster
  - ( 1.) Otoniel Quintana
  - ( 2.) Gabriel Hernández
  - ( 3.) Luis Soto
  - ( 4.) Oscar Muñoz
  - ( 5.) Darío López
  - ( 6.) Joaquín Pardo
  - ( 7.) Pedro Ospina
  - ( 8.) Germán Gonzalez
  - ( 9.) Alfredo Arango
  - (10.) Norman Ortiz
  - (11.) Gustavo Santa
  - (12.) Ramiro Viafara
  - (13.) Alberto Escobar
  - (14.) Gabriel Berdugo
  - (15.) Javier Tamayo
  - (16.) Alfonso Jaramillo
  - (17.) Fabio Mosquera

== Swimming ==
Men's 100 metres freestyle

- Federico Sicard
  - Heats — 59.0 s (→ 6th in heat, did not advance)
- Ricardo González
  - Heats — 57.0 s (→ 6th in heat, did not advance)

Women's 100 metres freestyle

- Patricia Olano
  - Heats — 1:05.3 min (→ 6th in heat, did not advance)

Men's 200 metres freestyle

- Federico Sicard
  - Heats — 2:11.1 min (→ 5th in heat, did not advance)
- Ricardo González
  - Heats — 2:05.8 min (→ 5th in heat, did not advance)
- Julio Arango
  - Heats — 2:03.1 min (→ 2nd in heat, did not advance)

Women's 200 metres freestyle

- Patricia Olano
  - Heats — 2:25.1 min (→ 5th in heat, did not advance)

Men's 400 metres freestyle

- Julio Arango
  - Heats — 4:25.8 min (→ 4th in heat, did not advance)

Women's 400 metres freestyle

- Patricia Olano
  - Heats — 5:01.8 min (→ 5th in heat, did not advance)
- Olga de Angulo
  - Heats — 5:08.6 min (→ 3rd in heat, did not advance)

Women's 800 metres freestyle

- Patricia Olano
  - Heats — 10:44.1 min (→ 4th in heat, did not advance)
- Olga de Angulo
  - Heats — 10:40.5 min (→ 5th in heat, did not advance)

Men's 1500 metres freestyle

- Julio Arango
  - Heats — 11:53.1 min (→ 4th in heat, did not advance)
- Tomás Becerra
  - Heats — DNS (→ no ranking)

Men's 100 metres breaststroke

- Ivan Gonima
  - Heats — 1:15.1 min (→ 7th in heat, did not advance)

Men's 200 metres breaststroke

- Ivan Gonima
  - Heats — 2:45.0 min (→ 6th in heat, did not advance)

Men's 100 metres butterfly

- Tomás Becerra
  - Heats — 1:02.2 min (→ 6th in heat, did not advance)

Women's 100 metres butterfly

- Carmen Gómez
  - Heats — 1:14.7 min (→ 4th in heat, did not advance)

Men's 200 metres butterfly

- Tomás Becerra
  - Heats — 2:16.8 min (→ 4th in heat, did not advance)

Women's 200 metres butterfly

- Carmen Gómez
  - Heats — 2:44.7 min (→ 5th in heat, did not advance)

Women's 200 metres individual medley

- Nelly Syro
  - Heats — 2:55.7 min (→ 5th in heat, did not advance)
- Olga de Angulo
  - Heats — 2:48.7 min (→ 7th in heat, did not advance)

Men's 400 metres individual medley

- Tomás Becerra
  - Heats — 5:09.7 min (→ 5th in heat, did not advance)

Women's 400 metres individual medley

- Olga de Angulo
  - Heats — 6:00.6 min (→ 5th in heat, did not advance)
- Patricia Olano
  - Heats — 5:52.6 min (→ 5th in heat, did not advance)
- Nelly Syro
  - Heats — 6:13.1 min (→ 5th in heat, did not advance)

Men's 4×100 metres freestyle relay

- Julio Arango, Federico Sicard, Tomás Becerra, Ricardo González
  - Heats — 3:51.5 min (→ 7th in heat, did not advance)

Men's 4×200 metres freestyle relay

- Tomás Becerra, Federico Sicard, Ricardo González, Julio Arango
  - Heats — 8:26.7 min (→ 5th in heat, did not advance)

== See also ==
- Sports in Colombia
