= Football at the 1967 Mediterranean Games – Men's team squads =

Below are the squads for the Football at the 1967 Mediterranean Games, hosted in Tunis, Tunisia, and took place between 7 and 17 September 1967.

== Group A ==
=== Algeria ===
Coach: (France) Lucien Leduc

No.	Pos.	Player	Date of birth (age)	Caps	Goals	Club
	GK	Abdelkader "Zerga" Ghalem	27 April 1938 (aged 29)			(Algerian Football Federation) MC Alger
	GK	Abdelkrim Laribi	25 December 1943 (aged 23)			(Algerian Football Federation) IRB Sougueur
	GK	Mohamed Nassou	4 October 1937 (aged 29)			(Algerian Football Federation) CR Belcourt
2	DF	Kamel Lemoui	10 July 1939 (aged 28)			(Algerian Football Federation) CR Belcourt
	DF	Ali Attoui	21 January 1942 (aged 25)			(Algerian Football Federation) Hamra Annaba
	DF	Messaoud Belloucif	30 November 1940 (aged 26)			(Algerian Football Federation) AS Khroub
	DF	Ahmed Bouden	4 December 1938 (aged 28)			(Algerian Football Federation) Hamra Annaba
	DF	Lakhdar Bouyahi	21 January 1946 (aged 21)			(Algerian Football Federation) NA Hussein Dey
8	MF	Hacène Lalmas (captain)	12 March 1943 (aged 24)			(Algerian Football Federation) CR Belcourt
10	MF	Abdelhamid Salhi	27 August 1947 (aged 20)			(Algerian Football Federation) ES Sétif
16	MF	Mustapha Seridi	18 April 1941 (aged 26)			(Algerian Football Federation) ES Guelma
	MF	Hacène Djemaâ	6 January 1942 (aged 25)			(Algerian Football Federation) CR Belcourt
	MF	Noureddine Hamiti	19 December 1942 (aged 24)			(Algerian Football Federation) CR Belcourt
7	FW	Hassan Achour	14 March 1938 (aged 29)			(Algerian Football Federation) CR Belcourt
9	FW	Mokhtar Khalem	10 October 1944 (aged 22)			(Algerian Football Federation) CR Belcourt
11	FW	Kamel Beroudji	9 September 1945 (aged 21)			(Algerian Football Federation) OM Ruisseau
	FW	Amar Bourouba	23 March 1941 (aged 26)			(Algerian Football Federation) ES Sétif
	FW	Noureddine Hachouf	10 May 1940 (aged 27)			(Algerian Football Federation) ES Guelma

=== France B ===
Coach:

No.	Pos.	Player	Date of birth (age)	Caps	Goals	Club
1	GK	Henri Ribul	1 March 1941 (aged 26)			(French Football Federation) US Castres
12	GK	Maurice Barreau	13 September 1939 (aged 27)			(French Football Federation) AS Beauvais Oise
3	DF	Gilbert Planté	15 March 1941 (aged 26)			(French Football Federation) Gazélec Ajaccio
5	DF	Jean Lempereur	28 December 1938 (aged 28)			(French Football Federation) AS Aulnoye
9	DF	Jean-Louis Hodoul	1 April 1946 (aged 21)			(French Football Federation) Olympique de Marseille
	DF	Michel Delafosse	25 November 1943 (aged 23)			(French Football Federation) US Quevilly
15	DF	Dario Grava	11 December 1948 (aged 18)			(French Football Federation) RC Strasbourg
4	MF	Freddy Zix (captain)	7 January 1935 (aged 32)			(French Football Federation) RC Strasbourg
16	MF	Gérard Géorgin	11 September 1940 (aged 26)			(French Football Federation) FC Nantes
	MF	Gérard Hallet	4 March 1946 (aged 21)			(French Football Federation) ÉDS Montluçon
	MF	Stéphane Akélian	7 December 1940 (aged 26)			(French Football Federation) FC Annecy
	MF	Alain Verhoeve	15 November 1944 (aged 22)			(French Football Federation) AC Cambrai
	MF	Michel Verhoeve	29 January 1939 (aged 28)			(French Football Federation) AC Cambrai
	MF	Michel Pech	4 June 1946 (aged 21)			(French Football Federation) FC Nantes
	MF	Gérard Hallet	4 March 1946 (aged 21)			(French Football Federation) Montluçon Football
19	FW	Daniel Horlaville	22 September 1945 (aged 21)			(French Football Federation) US Quevilly
	FW	Marc-Kanyan Case	14 September 1942 (aged 24)			(French Football Federation) Gazélec Ajaccio
	FW	Jacques Stamm	4 April 1939 (aged 28)			(French Football Federation) CS Sedan
	FW	Michel Verhoeve	29 January 1939 (aged 28)			(French Football Federation) AC Cambrai
	FW	Jean-Louis Rivoire	20 February 1943 (aged 24)			(French Football Federation) Olympique Lyonnais
	FW	Gérard Hausser	28 October 1941 (aged 25)			(French Football Federation) RC Strasbourg

=== Italy B ===
Coach: (Italy) Paolo Todeschini

No.	Pos.	Player	Date of birth (age)	Caps	Goals	Club
	GK	Villiam Vecchi	28 December 1948 (aged 18)			(Italian Football Federation) A.C. Milan
	GK	Adriano Zanier	22 May 1948 (aged 19)			(Italian Football Federation) SPAL
	DF	Franco Battisodo	15 April 1948 (aged 19)			(Italian Football Federation) Bologna F.C.
	DF	Giovanni Botti	16 December 1947 (aged 19)			(Italian Football Federation) Brescia
	DF	Franco Cresci	15 September 1945 (aged 21)			(Italian Football Federation) Varese
	DF	Giovanni Masiello	2 January 1945 (aged 22)			(Italian Football Federation) S.S. Lazio
	DF	Luigi Pasetti	9 September 1945 (aged 21)			(Italian Football Federation) SPAL
	DF	Tomasini	28 September 1946 (aged 20)			(Italian Football Federation) Reggina
	MF	Salvatore Esposito	3 January 1948 (aged 19)			(Italian Football Federation) Fiorentina
	MF	Mario Fara	14 September 1945 (aged 21)			(Italian Football Federation) Catania
	MF	Domenico Parola	15 February 1945 (aged 22)			(Italian Football Federation) SPAL
	MF	Nevio Scala	22 November 1947 (aged 19)			(Italian Football Federation) A.C. Milan
	MF	Giorgio Vignando	17 December 1947 (aged 19)			(Italian Football Federation) Empoli
	FW	Pietro Anastasi	7 April 1948 (aged 19)			(Italian Football Federation) Varese
	FW	Pietro Baisi	19 September 1945 (aged 21)			(Italian Football Federation) Catania
	FW	Luciano Chiarugi	13 January 1947 (aged 20)			(Italian Football Federation) Fiorentina
	FW	Luciano Paganini	2 March 1947 (aged 20)			(Italian Football Federation) Bologna
	FW	Giuseppe Savoldi	21 January 1947 (aged 20)			(Italian Football Federation) Atalanta B.C.

=== Morocco ===
Coach: Abderrahmane Mahjoub

No.	Pos.	Player	Date of birth (age)	Caps	Goals	Club
	GK	Allal Ben Kassou	30 November 1941 (aged 25)			(Royal Moroccan Football Federation) FAR Rabat
	GK	Mohamed Ben Omar				(Royal Moroccan Football Federation) FAR Rabat
	DF	Jalili Fadili	1 January 1940 (aged 27)			(Royal Moroccan Football Federation) FAR Rabat
	DF	Moulay Khanousi	21 June 1939 (aged 28)			(Royal Moroccan Football Federation) MAS Fez
	DF	Kacem Slimani	1 January 1948 (aged 19)			(Royal Moroccan Football Federation) RS Settat
	MF	Driss Bamous	15 December 1942 (aged 24)			(Royal Moroccan Football Federation) FAR Rabat
	MF	Hamed Dahane	1 January 1946 (aged 21)			(Royal Moroccan Football Federation) Union Sidi Kacem
	MF	Ismail Hattab				(Royal Moroccan Football Federation) FAR Rabat
	MF	Sadni Nafai	1 January 1940 (aged 27)			
	FW	Ali Bendayan				(Royal Moroccan Football Federation) Raja Casablanca
	FW	Ahmed Faras	7 December 1946 (aged 20)			(Royal Moroccan Football Federation) Chabab Mohammedia
	FW	Said Ghandi	16 September 1948 (aged 18)			(Royal Moroccan Football Federation) Raja Casablanca
	FW	Maouhoub Ghazouani	1 January 1948 (aged 19)			(Royal Moroccan Football Federation) TAS de Casablanca
	FW	Houmane Jarir	30 November 1944 (aged 22)			(Royal Moroccan Football Federation) Raja Casablanca
	FW	Abderrazak Hajjami				(Royal Moroccan Football Federation) Wydad Casablanca

== Group B ==
=== Libya ===
Coach:

No.	Pos.	Player	Date of birth (age)	Caps	Goals	Club
	DF	Mahmud Al-Shawush				(Libyan Football Federation) Al-Madina
	MF	Naji Al-Maadani				(Libyan Football Federation) Al-Ahly Benghazi
	FW	Mustafa Al-Toumi				(Libyan Football Federation)
	FW	Mehdi Al-Sokny				(Libyan Football Federation) Al-Ittihad Tripoli
	FW	Ahmed Ben Soueid				(Libyan Football Federation) Al-Ahly Benghazi
	FW	Hassan Al-Sanoussi				(Libyan Football Federation) Al-Ahly Tripoli

=== Spain B ===
Coach: José Santamaría

No.	Pos.	Player	Date of birth (age)	Caps	Goals	Club
	GK	Pere Valentí Mora	18 December 1947 (aged 19)			(Royal Spanish Football Federation) Atlético Cataluña
	GK	Martí				(Royal Spanish Football Federation) Real Madrid
		Isidoro García Temprano	16 February 1947 (aged 20)			(Royal Spanish Football Federation) Atlético Madrid
		José Ramón Betzuen Urkiza	11 November 1947 (aged 19)			(Royal Spanish Football Federation) Athletic Bilbao
		Moya				(Royal Spanish Football Federation) Atlético Madrid
	DF	Miguel Ángel Ochoa	29 September 1944 (aged 22)			(Royal Spanish Football Federation) Espanyol
		Gabarró				(Royal Spanish Football Federation) Espanyol
		González				(Royal Spanish Football Federation) Real Madrid
	MF	Clemente Iriarte	25 July 1946 (aged 21)			(Royal Spanish Football Federation) Rayo Vallecano
	MF	Chus Pereda	15 June 1938 (aged 29)			(Royal Spanish Football Federation) Barcelona
	MF	Javier Irureta	1 April 1948 (aged 19)			(Royal Spanish Football Federation) Atlético Madrid
	FW	Ramón Alfonseda	4 March 1948 (aged 19)			(Royal Spanish Football Federation) Barcelona
	FW	José Bosch Huguet	1 October 1946 (aged 20)			(Royal Spanish Football Federation) Barcelona
	FW	Domingo Solaegui Urquiri	6 November 1945 (aged 21)			(Royal Spanish Football Federation) Real Unión
	FW	Ramón Tejada Acuña	3 October 1943 (aged 23)			(Royal Spanish Football Federation) Real Madrid
	FW	Cabezas				(Royal Spanish Football Federation) Espanyol
	FW	Peláez				(Royal Spanish Football Federation) Real Madrid

=== Tunisia ===
Coach:

No.	Pos.	Player	Date of birth (age)	Caps	Goals	Club
	GK	Sadok "Attouga" Sassi	15 November 1945 (aged 21)			(Tunisian Football Federation) Club Africain
	DF	Ahmed M'Ghirbi	17 June 1946 (aged 21)			(Tunisian Football Federation) Stade Tunisien
	DF	Mahfoudh Benzarti	22 January 1942 (aged 25)			(Tunisian Football Federation) US Monastir
	DF	Mohsen Habacha	25 January 1942 (aged 25)			(French Football Federation) AC Ajaccio
	MF	Tahar Chaïbi	17 February 1946 (aged 21)			(Tunisian Football Federation) Club Africain
	MF	Abdelmajid Chetali	4 July 1939 (aged 28)			(Tunisian Football Federation) Étoile du Sahel
	MF	Amor Madhi	22 August 1946 (aged 21)			(Tunisian Football Federation) Sfax RS
	FW	Youssef Zouaoui	11 September 1946 (aged 20)			(Tunisian Football Federation) CA Bizertin
	FW	Habib Akid	13 February 1946 (aged 21)			(Tunisian Football Federation) Étoile Sportive du Sahel
	FW	Abdelwahab Lahmar	27 March 1944 (aged 23)			(Tunisian Football Federation) Stade Tunisien
	FW	Abdeljabar Machouche	26 February 1945 (aged 22)			(Tunisian Football Federation) Espérance de Tunis

=== Turkey B ===
Coach: Nazım Koka

No.	Pos.	Player	Date of birth (age)	Caps	Goals	Club
	GK	Mümin Özkasap	1 March 1944 (aged 23)			(Turkish Football Federation) Altınordu
		Yetik Ferizcan	18 January 1941 (aged 26)			(Turkish Football Federation) PTT S.K.
		İsmail Arca	5 September 1948 (aged 19)			(Turkish Football Federation) Eskişehirspor
		Şevki Gençosmanoğlu				(Turkish Football Federation) Trabzonspor
		Zinnur Sarı	4 April 1947 (aged 20)			(Turkish Football Federation) Altay
		Burhan Tözer	15 January 1947 (aged 20)			(Turkish Football Federation) Gençlerbirliği
		Fuat Saner	26 August 1945 (aged 22)			(Turkish Football Federation) Feriköy
		Selçuk Yalçıntaş	30 November 1942 (aged 24)			(Turkish Football Federation) Ankaragücü
		Özmetin Erkut				(Turkish Football Federation) Galatasaray
		Erdoğan Ertaul	15 May 1948 (aged 19)			(Turkish Football Federation) Vefa
		Vedat Okyar	1 August 1945 (aged 22)			(Turkish Football Federation) Bursaspor
		Hayrettin Endersert	9 July 1950 (aged 17)			(Turkish Football Federation) Gençlerbirliği
		Cengiz Arslan				(Turkish Football Federation) Fenerbahçe
		Necati Göçmen	30 November 1945 (aged 21)			(Turkish Football Federation) Bursaspor
		Hamdi Tezol	1 December 1941 (aged 25)			(Turkish Football Federation) Samsunspor
		Ender Konca	22 October 1947 (aged 19)			(Turkish Football Federation) İstanbulspor
		Faruk Karadoğan	30 December 1947 (aged 19)			(Turkish Football Federation) Beşiktaş
