= France at the 1967 Mediterranean Games =

- IOC code: FRA
- NOC: French Olympic Committee

in Naples
- Medals Ranked 3rd: Gold 12 Silver 6 Bronze 4 Total 22

Mediterranean Games appearances (overview)
- 1951; 1955; 1959; 1963; 1967; 1971; 1975; 1979; 1983; 1987; 1991; 1993; 1997; 2001; 2005; 2009; 2013; 2018; 2022; 2026

France competed at the 1967 Mediterranean Games in Tunis, Tunisia.

== Medalists ==
=== Gold ===
- Pierre Toussaint (M) — Athletics, 800 metres
- Sylviane Telliez (W) — Athletics, 100 metres
- Bernard Vallée (M) — Fencing, Individual sabre
- Jacques Ladègaillerie (M) — Fencing, Individual épée
- Team (M) — Football (gold medal shared with Italy)
  - Marc-Kanyan Case, Michel Delafosse, Dario Grava, Gérard Hallet, Jean-Louis Hodoul, Daniel Horlaville,
  - Jean Lempereur, Gilbert Planté, Henri Ribul, Jacques Stamm, Michel Verhoeve, Freddy Zix
- J. Muller (M) - Weightlifting, 67.5 kg
- Rolf Maier (M) - Weightlifting, 75 kg
- Marcel Paterni (M) - Weightlifting, 82.5 kg
- Jean-Paul Fouletier (M) - Weightlifting, +90 kg
- Daniel Robin (M) — Wrestling, Freestyle 78 kg
- Raymond Blaud (M) — Wrestling, Freestyle Open Category
- Daniel Robin (M) - Wrestling, Greco-Roman, 78 kg

=== Silver ===
- Arnjolt Beer (M) — Athletics, Shot put
- Christian Noël (M) — Fencing, Individual foil
- Jean-Pierre Meurat (M) — Weightlifting, 56 kg
- J. Dumas (M) - Weightlifting, 60 kg
- Serges (M) — Wrestling, Greco-Roman 57 kg
- Team (M) - Volleyball tournament

=== Bronze ===
- Jean-Pierre Colusso (M) — Athletics, Pole vault
- Pierre Rodocanachi (M) — Fencing, Individual foil
- Alfred Steiner (M) - Weightlifting, 90 kg
- Marcel Levasseur (M) — Wrestling, Freestyle 97 kg
