= 1968 CONMEBOL Pre-Olympic Tournament =

Tournament details
- Teams: 8

Final positions
- Champions: Brazil
- Runners-up: Colombia
- Third place: Uruguay
- Fourth place: Paraguay

The 1968 CONMEBOL Pre-Olympic Tournament took place during March and April 1968. It was the 3rd CONMEBOL Pre-Olympic Tournament.

Argentina and Bolivia did not participate. Brazil and Colombia qualified for the 1968 Summer Olympics.

== Group stage ==
=== Group 1 ===
Pos	Team	Pld	W	D	L	GF	GA	GD	Pts	Qualification
1	Paraguay	3	2	1	0	4	0	+4	5	Advance to final group
2	Brazil	3	1	2	0	3	0	+3	4	Advance to final group
3	Chile	3	1	1	1	1	1	0	3	
4	Venezuela	3	0	0	3	0	7	−7	0	

Source: RSSSF
19 March 1968

Brazil	0–0	Paraguay

Estadio Atanasio Girardot, Medellín
Attendance: 16,205
Referee: Pablo Víctor Vaga (Uruguay)
19 March 1968

Venezuela	0–1	Chile
		Marchant 85'

Estadio Municipal, Barranquilla
Attendance: 2,200
Referee: Herwin Hiegers (Peru)
22 March 1968

Chile	0–1	Paraguay
		Martínez 43'

Estadio Atanasio Girardot, Medellín
Attendance: 6,164
Referee: Eduardo Rendón (Ecuador)
22 March 1968

Brazil	3–0	Venezuela
Dionísio (?); Maria (?); China (?)

Estadio Municipal, Barranquilla
Referee: Guillermo Velasquez (Colombia)
27 March 1968

Brazil	0–0	Chile

Estadio Atanasio Girardot, Medellín
Referee: Herwin Hiegers (Peru)
27 March 1968

Venezuela	3–0	Paraguay
Sosa (?); Martínez (?); Sandoval (?)

Estadio Municipal, Barranquilla
Referee: Pablo Víctor Vaga (Uruguay

=== Group 2 ===
Pos	Team	Pld	W	D	L	GF	GA	GD	Pts	Qualification
1	Colombia	3	2	1	0	4	2	+2	5	Advance to final group
2	Uruguay	3	1	2	0	3	1	+2	4	Advance to final group
3	Peru	3	0	2	1	2	3	−1	2	
4	Ecuador	3	0	1	2	1	4	−3	1	

Source: RSSSF
19 March 1968

Colombia	1–0	Ecuador
Santa 49'

Estadio El Campín, Bogotá
Attendance: 26,000
Referee: Airton Viera (Brazil)
19 March 1968

Uruguay	0–0	Peru

Estadio Pascual Guerrero, Cali
Attendance: 10,045
Referee: Antonio Vicuña (Chile)
22 March 1968

Colombia	2–1	Peru
Santa 15'; Mosquera 85'		González 18'

Estadio El Campín, Bogotá
Attendance: 56,600
Referee: Ivan Barrios (Venezuela)
22 March 1968

Uruguay	2–0	Ecuador
Brandon 41'; Prestes 85'

Estadio Pascual Guerrero, Cali
Attendance: 1,725
Referee: Ramírez Alvarez (Paraguay)
27 March 1968

Colombia	1–1	Uruguay
Retat 84'		Eugui 19'

Estadio El Campín, Bogotá
Attendance: 57,600
Referee: Antonio Vicuña (Chile)
27 March 1968

Peru	1–1	Ecuador
González (?)		Pérez (?)

Estadio Pascual Guerrero, Cali
Referee: Airton Viera (Brazil)

== Final group ==
Pos	Team	Pld	W	D	L	GF	GA	GD	Pts	Qualification
1	Brazil	3	2	0	1	6	2	+4	4	Qualification for 1968 Summer Olympics
2	Colombia	3	2	0	1	6	5	+1	4	Qualification for 1968 Summer Olympics
3	Uruguay	3	1	1	1	5	6	−1	3	
4	Paraguay	3	0	1	2	5	9	−4	1	

Source: RSSSF
31 March 1968

Uruguay	2–1	Brazil
Dutra 4' (o.g.); Brandon 60'		China (?)

Estadio El Campín, Bogotá
Attendance: 26,000
Referee: Duval Goicoechea (Argentina)
2 April 1968

Colombia	4–2	Paraguay
Santa 32'; Mesa 77', 85'; Pardo 83'		Escobar 51'; Sosa 71'

Estadio El Campín, Bogotá
Attendance: 50,000
Referee: Herwin Hiegers (Peru)
6 April 1968

Colombia	2–0	Uruguay
Jaramillo 3', 43' (pen.)

Estadio El Campín, Bogotá
Referee: Herwin Hiegers (Peru)
6 April 1968

Brazil	2–0 Awarded	Paraguay

Estadio El Campín, Bogotá
Referee: Duval Goicoechea (Argentina)

Match abandoned by Paraguay at 85'. The match was awarded 2–0 to Brazil.

7 April 1968

Paraguay	3–3	Uruguay
J. Martinez (?); F. Martínez (?); Escobar (?)		Brandon 53'; Santos 17', 83'

Estadio El Campín, Bogotá
Attendance: 15,307
Referee: Herwin Hiegers (Peru)
9 April 1968

Colombia	0–3	Brazil
		Lauro 23'; China 34'; Maria 71'

Estadio El Campín, Bogotá
Attendance: 51,575
Referee: Duval Goicoechea (Argentina)
