= 1970 African Cup of Nations squads =

This is a list of the squads which took part at the 1970 African Cup of Nations. The Sudan national football team won the 1970 tournament.

== Cameroon ==
Coach: Raymond Fobete

No.	Pos.	Player	Date of birth (age)	Caps	Goals	Club
	GK	Jean "Remetter" Atangana Ottou	21 November 1941 (aged 28)			(Cameroonian Football Federation) Prisons Buea FC
	DF	Gustave "Boulon" Evou				(Cameroonian Football Federation) Dragon Yaoundé
	DF	Paul N'Lend				(Cameroonian Football Federation) Canon Yaoundé
	DF	Pascal "Homme Sec" Baylon Owona (captain)				(Cameroonian Football Federation) Tonnerre Yaoundé
	DF	Samuel "Bell" Essomba				(Cameroonian Football Federation) Oryx Douala
	MF	Jean "Confiance" Moukoko	15 September 1939 (aged 30)			(Cameroonian Football Federation) Oryx Douala
	MF	Jean-Marie Tsébo	31 December 1945 (aged 24)			(Cameroonian Football Federation) Aigle Nkongsamba
	MF	Jean Moutassié				(Cameroonian Football Federation) Dragon Yaoundé
	MF	Gabriel Abossolo	16 January 1939 (aged 31)			(French Football Federation) RFC Paris-Neuilly
	FW	Emmanuel Koum	5 January 1946 (aged 24)			(French Football Federation) FC Grenoble
	FW	Jean-Baptiste Ndoga	1945			(Cameroonian Football Federation) Diamant Yaoundé
	FW	Dieudonné "Docta" Bassanguen	5 May 1944 (aged 25)			(Cameroonian Football Federation) Dragon Yaoundé
	FW	Jean Manga "Tête d'Or" Onguéné	12 June 1946 (aged 23)			(Cameroonian Football Federation) Canon Yaoundé
	MF	Paul-Gaston Ndongo	1950			(Cameroonian Football Federation) Canon Yaoundé
	MF	Isaac "Sorcier" Mbété				(Cameroonian Football Federation) Caïman Douala
	MF	Priso Dotélé Kuntz				(Cameroonian Football Federation) Oryx Douala
	MF	Emmanuel Mvé Elemva	6 January 1946 (aged 24)			(Cameroonian Football Federation) Canon Yaoundé
	MF	Samuel Mbappé "Maréchal" Léppé	28 February 1936 (aged 33)			(Cameroonian Football Federation) Oryx Douala
	MF	Walter Moumi Embellé				(Cameroonian Football Federation) Oryx Douala
	FW	Philippe-Michel Mouthé Ngongang				(Cameroonian Football Federation) Bafia FC
	GK	Joseph Ayissi				(Cameroonian Football Federation) Epervier d'Ebolowa
	MF	Georges Ndo Nna				(Cameroonian Football Federation) Canon Yaoundé

- some modern sources report that Dominique Colonna was the head coach but Fobété was given this role in July 1969.

Cameroon also attempted to call up Joseph Yegba Maya of Olympique Marseille to the squad, but Marseille's demands for financial compensation were too high.

== Congo-Kinshasa ==
Coach: André Mori

No.	Pos.	Player	Date of birth (age)	Caps	Goals	Club
	GK	Robert Kazadi Mwamba	6 March 1947 (aged 22)			(Congolese Association Football Federation) TP Englebert
	DF	Salomon "Général" Mange]				(Congolese Association Football Federation) AS Vita Club
	DF	Pierre Katumba	1945			(Congolese Association Football Federation) TP Englebert
	DF	Albert Mukombo Mwanza	17 December 1945 (aged 24)			(Congolese Association Football Federation) TP Englebert
	DF	Raymond Bwanga Tshimenu	4 January 1949 (aged 21)			(Congolese Association Football Federation) TP Englebert
	MF	Léonard "Suisse" Saïdi bin Piri	24 November 1941 (aged 28)			(Congolese Association Football Federation) TP Englebert
	MF	Jean Kembo	27 December 1947 (aged 22)			(Congolese Association Football Federation) AS Vita Club
	MF	Ernest "Roi Saïo" Mokili	3 June 1945 (aged 24)			(Congolese Association Football Federation) AS Dragons
	MF	Joseph "Gento" Kibonge (captain)	12 February 1945 (aged 24)			(Congolese Association Football Federation) AS Vita Club
	MF	Raoul Albert Mantantu	17 November 1946 (aged 23)			(Congolese Association Football Federation) Diables Rouges de Thysville
	MF	Martin "Brinch" Tshinabu	8 May 1946 (aged 23)			(Congolese Association Football Federation) TP Englebert
	MF	Zacharie "Zamatshi" Tshibangu				(Congolese Association Football Federation) Union St-Gilloise
	FW	André Kalonzo				(Congolese Association Football Federation) Diables Rouges de Thysville
	FW	Adelard Mayanga	31 October 1948 (aged 21)			(Congolese Association Football Federation) AS Vita Club
	FW	Emmanuel Etepé	22 November 1950 (aged 19)			(Congolese Association Football Federation) CS Imana
	FW	Léon Mungamuni	24 March 1947 (aged 22)			(Congolese Association Football Federation) AS Vita Club
	DF	Alphonse "Lieutenant" Likimba				(Congolese Association Football Federation) CS Imana
	DF	Philippe Mampuya				(Congolese Association Football Federation)

== United Arab Republic ==
Coach: Saleh El Wahsh

No.	Pos.	Player	Date of birth (age)	Caps	Goals	Club
	GK	Hassan Mokhtar	26 January 1944 (aged 26)			(Egyptian Football Association) Ismaily
	GK	Hassan Orabi	21 October 1947 (aged 22)			(Egyptian Football Association) Al-Ittihad Alexandria
	DF	Abdelkarim El-Gohary	1 January 1947 (aged 23)			(Egyptian Football Association) Zamalek
	DF	Mohammed El-Seyagui	20 January 1949 (aged 21)			(Egyptian Football Association) Ghazl El-Mehalla
	DF	Mohamed Abu El-Ezz				(Egyptian Football Association) Tersana
	DF	Mohammed Ibrahim El-Mazati "Bobbo"				(Egyptian Football Association) Al-Ittihad Alexandria
	DF	Mimi Darwish	20 March 1942 (aged 27)			(Egyptian Football Association) Ismaily
	DF	Hany Moustafa	27 October 1947 (aged 22)			(Egyptian Football Association) Al-Ahly
	MF	Mansour Hamid El-Bouri				(Egyptian Football Association) Olympic
	FW	Ibrahim Abdel Samad				(Egyptian Football Association) Al-Ahly
	MF	Salah Hosni				(Egyptian Football Association) Al-Ahly
	DF	Shawki Hussein				(Egyptian Football Association) Zamalek
	MF	Hassan El-Shazly	13 November 1943 (aged 26)			(Egyptian Football Association) Tersana
	MF	Taha Basry	2 October 1946 (aged 23)			(Egyptian Football Association) Zamalek
	MF	Sayed Abdelrazek				(Egyptian Football Association) Ismaily
	FW	Ali Abo Gresha	29 November 1947 (aged 22)			(Egyptian Football Association) Ismaily
	MF	Shehta El Iskandarani				(Egyptian Football Association) Al-Ittihad Alexandria
	MF	Farouk El-Sayed Ibrahim				(Egyptian Football Association) Olympic
	FW	Moustafa Reyadh				(Egyptian Football Association) Tersana
	DF	Yaken Zaki				(Egyptian Football Association) Zamalek
	DF	Aboubakr El Sayed Hassan				(Egyptian Football Association) Al-Ittihad Alexandria
	DF	Mohamed Abdel Atif El-Sherbini				(Egyptian Football Association) El-Plastic

== Ethiopia ==
Coach:Adam Alemu and Tsehaye Bahre

No.	Pos.	Player	Date of birth (age)	Caps	Goals	Club
	GK	Getachew Abebe				(Ethiopian Football Federation) Saint George SA
	GK	Yohannes Kidane				
	GK	Amde Michael Gebre-Selassie				(Ethiopian Football Federation) EEPCO
	DF	Bekuretsion Gebrehiwot				(Eritrean National Football Federation) Hamasien
	MF	Abraha Gobezayehu				
	DF	Afework Tsegaye				(Eritrean National Football Federation) Tele SC
	DF	Gezahegn Manyazewal				(Eritrean National Football Federation) Dagnew
	DF	Berhe Goitom				(Ethiopian Football Federation) EEPCO
	DF	Abraha Araya				(Eritrean National Football Federation) Embassoria
	FW	Getachew Wolde Abdo				(Ethiopian Football Federation) Saint George SA
	MF	Jemil Hassen				(Eritrean National Football Federation) Tele SC
	FW	Tekeste Gebremedhin				(Eritrean National Football Federation) Embassoria
	MF	Mengistu Worku	1940			(Ethiopian Football Federation) Saint George SA
	MF	Geremew Zergaw				(Ethiopian Football Federation) Ethiopian Airlines FC
	MF	Luciano Vassalo	15 August 1935 (aged 34)			(Ethiopian Football Federation) Cotton Factory SA
	DF	Wolde-Emmanuel Fesseha	1 January 1948 (aged 22)			(United States Soccer Federation) UCLA Bruins
	DF	Asefaw Tewolde				
	MF	Haile Tesfa-Gabre				(Eritrean National Football Federation) Tele SC
	FW	Shewangizaw Agonafer				(United States Soccer Federation) UCLA Bruins
	FW	Engdawork Tariku	1945			(Ethiopian Football Federation) Saint George SA
	FW	Italo Vassalo	1940			(Ethiopian Football Federation) Saint George SA

== Ghana ==
Coach: (Germany) Karl-Heinz Marotzke

No.	Pos.	Player	Date of birth (age)	Caps	Goals	Club
	GK	Robert Mensah	12 June 1939 (aged 30)			(Ghana Football Association) Asante Kotoko
	GK	Jon Bortey Noawy	13 June 1939 (aged 30)			(Ghana Football Association) Asante Kotoko
	DF	Edward Boye	1946			(Ghana Football Association) Great Olympics
	DF	Armah Akuetteh	27 January 1946 (aged 24)			(Ghana Football Association) Cornestone
	DF	John Eshun (C)	17 July 1942 (aged 27)			(Ghana Football Association) Sekondi Hasaacas
	DF	Oliver Acquah	22 March 1946 (aged 23)			(Ghana Football Association) Asante Kotoko
	MF	Robert Foley	7 June 1946 (aged 23)			(Ghana Football Association) Hearts of Oak
	FW	Joseph Ghartey	27 June 1943 (aged 26)			(Ghana Football Association) Hearts of Oak
	DF	Alex Mingle	1948			(Ghana Football Association) Ebusua Dwarfs
	MF	Ibrahim Sunday	22 June 1944 (aged 25)			(Ghana Football Association) Asante Kotoko
	FW	Osmanu Orlando				(Ghana Football Association) Asante Kotoko
	FW	Kwasi Owusu	5 November 1945 (aged 24)			(Ghana Football Association) Bofoakwa Tano
	FW	Malik Jabir	8 December 1944 (aged 25)			(Ghana Football Association) Asante Kotoko
	MF	Cecil Jones Attuquayefio	18 October 1944 (aged 25)			(Ghana Football Association) Great Olympics
	FW	Abukari Gariba	13 June 1939 (aged 30)			(Ghana Football Association) Asante Kotoko
	FW	Abeka Ankrah	8 December 1943 (aged 26)			(Ghana Football Association) Hearts of Oak
	GK	Abdulai Sanni				(Ghana Football Association) Eleven Wise

== Guinea ==
Coach: Naby Camara

No.	Pos.	Player	Date of birth (age)	Caps	Goals	Club
	GK	Mamady Sano				
	GK	Morlaye Camara	1933			(Guinean Football Federation) AS Kindia
	DF	Sékou Condé	1943			
	DF	Arsène Campbell				
	FW	Ibrahima Aly Badara Keita				
	DF	Pierre Bangoura(C)	1938			
	MF	Jacob Bangoura	1945			(Guinean Football Federation) Conakry II
	MF	Mamadouba Camara	4 February 1945 (aged 25)			(Guinean Football Federation) Conakry II
	MF	Ousmane Thiam Tollo				
	MF	Ibrahima Kandia Diallo	15 November 1941 (aged 28)			(Guinean Football Federation) AS Kaloum
	MF	Chérif Souleymane	20 October 1944 (aged 25)			(Guinean Football Federation) Conakry II
	FW	Sény Soumah				
	MF	Soriba Soumah	1946			(Guinean Football Federation) Conakry II
	FW	Ibrahima Sory Keita	30 November 1944 (aged 25)			(Guinean Football Federation) Conakry II
	FW	Mamadouba N'Dongo Camara	1945			

== Côte d'Ivoire ==
Coach: (Germany) Peter Schnittger

No.	Pos.	Player	Date of birth (age)	Caps	Goals	Club
	GK	Ibrahima Fanny	29 September 1943 (aged 26)			(Ivorian Football Federation) Stella Club
	GK	Jean Keita				(Ivorian Football Federation) ASEC Mimosas
	DF	Séry Wawa(C)	1943			(Ivorian Football Federation) Africa Sports
	DF	Denis Gnégnéry				(Ivorian Football Federation) Africa Sports
	DF	André Obrou				
	DF	Jean-Baptiste Akassou Akran				(Ivorian Football Federation) ASEC Mimosas
	DF	Joseph Niankouri				(Ivorian Football Federation) Africa Sports
	MF	Alphonse Yoro				(Ivorian Football Federation) ASEC Mimosas
	MF	Bernard Gnahoré				(Ivorian Football Federation) Africa Sports
	MF	Mathias Diagou				(Ivorian Football Federation) Stade d'Abidjan
	MF	Christophe Bazo				(Ivorian Football Federation) ASEC Mimosas
	FW	François Tahi	28 May 1950 (aged 19)			(Ivorian Football Federation) Stade d'Abidjan
	FW	Diomandé Losseni				
	FW	Honoré Djiké				(Ivorian Football Federation) Stella Club
	FW	Laurent Pokou	10 August 1947 (aged 22)			(Ivorian Football Federation) ASEC Mimosas
	DF	Mangué Cissé	17 November 1945 (aged 24)			(Ivorian Football Federation) ASEC Mimosas
	FW	Clément Lorougnon				
	MF	Ernest Kallet Bialy	1943 or 1944			(Ivorian Football Federation) Africa Sports

== Sudan ==
Coach: (Sudan) Abdel-Fattah Hamad Abu-Zeid (1933)

No.	Pos.	Player	Date of birth (age)	Caps	Goals	Club
	GK	Abdelaziz Abdallah	1947			(Sudan Football Association) Al-Merrikh SC
	GK	Muhamed Abdelfatah Zughbir	1949			(Sudan Football Association) Al-Hilal Club
	DF	Samir Saleh				(Sudan Football Association) Al-Nil SC (Wad Madani)
	DF	Negm El-Din Hassan	1945			(Sudan Football Association) Al Neel SC (Khartoum)
	DF	Awad Koka	1947			(Sudan Football Association) Al-Hilal Club
	DF	Suliman Abdelgader				(Sudan Football Association) Al-Merrikh SC
	DF	Mahmoud James	1947			(Sudan Football Association) Al-Tahrir SC (Bahri)
	DF	Amin Zaki (c)				(Sudan Football Association) Al-Hilal Club
	DF	Alser Kaounda	1949			(Sudan Football Association) Al-Merrikh SC
	MF	Bushara Abdel-Nadief	1947			(Sudan Football Association) Al-Merrikh SC
	MF	Nasreldin Jaksa	13 August 1944 (aged 25)			(Sudan Football Association) Al-Hilal Club
	FW	Muhamed Albashir Al-Esaid				(Sudan Football Association) Al-Nil SC (Wad Madani)
	FW	Hasabu El-Sagheer	1945			(Sudan Football Association) Burri SC
	FW	Ali Gagarin	1 April 1949 (aged 20)			(Sudan Football Association) Al-Hilal Club
	FW	Ezzeldin Al-Dehish	1948			(Sudan Football Association) Al-Hilal Club
	MF	Bushra Wahba	1 January 1943 (aged 27)			(Sudan Football Association) Al-Merrikh SC
	MF	Ahmed Bashir Abbas				(Sudan Football Association) Al-Mourada SC
	DF	Abdelkafi Abuelgasem				(Sudan Football Association) Burri SC
	FW	Babiker Santo				(Sudan Football Association) Al-Ahli SC (Wad Madani)
	MF	Awad Abdelghani				(Sudan Football Association) Al Ahli SC (Khartoum)
