= 1968 CONMEBOL Pre-Olympic Tournament final group =

CONMEBOL Pre-Olympic Tournament group

The final group of the 1968 CONMEBOL Pre-Olympic Tournament took place from 31 March to 9 April 1968. The group consisted of host nation Colombia, as well as Brazil, Paraguay, Uruguay. The top two teams, Brazil and Colombia, advanced to the final group.

== Standings ==
Pos	Team	Pld	W	D	L	GF	GA	GD	Pts	Qualification
1	Brazil	3	2	0	1	6	2	+4	4	Qualification for 1968 Summer Olympics
2	Colombia	3	2	0	1	6	5	+1	4	Qualification for 1968 Summer Olympics
3	Uruguay	3	1	1	1	5	6	−1	3	
4	Paraguay	3	0	1	2	5	9	−4	1	

Source: RSSSF

== Matches ==
31 March 1968

Uruguay	2–1	Brazil
Dutra 4' (o.g.); Brandon 60'		China (?)

Estadio El Campín, Bogotá
Attendance: 26,000
Referee: Duval Goicoechea (Argentina)
2 April 1968

Colombia	4–2	Paraguay
Santa 32'; Mesa 77', 85'; Pardo 83'		Escobar 51'; Sosa 71'

Estadio El Campín, Bogotá
Attendance: 50,000
Referee: Herwin Hiegers (Peru)
6 April 1968

Colombia	2–0	Uruguay
Jaramillo 3', 43' (pen.)

Estadio El Campín, Bogotá
Referee: Herwin Hiegers (Peru)
6 April 1968

Brazil	2–0 Awarded	Paraguay

Estadio El Campín, Bogotá
Referee: Duval Goicoechea (Argentina)

Match abandoned by Paraguay at 85'. The match was awarded 2–0 to Brazil.

7 April 1968

Paraguay	3–3	Uruguay
J. Martínez (?); F. Martínez (?); Escobar (?)		Brandon 53'; Santos 17', 83'

Estadio El Campín, Bogotá
Attendance: 15,307
Referee: Herwin Hiegers (Peru)
9 April 1968

Colombia	0–3	Brazil
		Lauro 23'; China 34'; Maria 71'

Estadio El Campín, Bogotá
Attendance: 51,575
Referee: Duval Goicoechea (Argentina)

== Goalscorers ==
There were 20 goals scored in 5 matches, for an average of 4 goals per match.

2 goals

- (Paraguay Olympic football team) Adalberto Escobar
- (Colombia Olympic football team) Orlando Mesa
- (Colombia Olympic football team) Alfonso Jaramillo
- (Uruguay Olympic football team) Ricardo Brandon
- (Uruguay Olympic football team) Jorge Santos
- (Brazil Olympic football team) China

1 goal

- (Colombia Olympic football team) Gustavo Santa
- (Paraguay Olympic football team) Miguel Ángel Sosa
- (Colombia Olympic football team) Joaquín Pardo
- (Paraguay Olympic football team) Juan Martínez
- (Paraguay Olympic football team) Francisco Martínez
- (Brazil Olympic football team) Lauro de Mello
- (Brazil Olympic football team) Manoel Maria

1 own goal

- (Brazil Olympic football team) José Dutra
