= Football at the 1967 Mediterranean Games =

1967 Mediterranean Games football tournament
Tournament details
- Host country: Tunisia
- City: Tunis
- Dates: 7–17 September 1967
- Teams: 8 (from 2 confederations)
- Venue: 2 (in 1 host city)

Final positions
- Champions: France Amateurs (1st title); Italy B (3rd title)
- Third place: Spain B
- Fourth place: Turkey B

Tournament statistics
- Matches played: 17
- Goals scored: 41 (2.41 per match)
- Top scorer(s): (France) Daniel Horlaville (Turkey) Ender Konca (3 goals each)

The 1967 Mediterranean Games football tournament was the 5th edition of the Mediterranean Games men's football tournament. The football tournament was held in Tunis, Tunisia between the 7–17 September 1967 as part of the 1967 Mediterranean Games.

== Participating teams ==
The following countries have participated for the final tournament:

Federation	Nation
CAF Africa	Algeria; Libya; Morocco; Tunisia (hosts)
UEFA Europe	France Amateurs; Italy B (holders); Spain B Turkey B

== Venues ==
Cities	Venues	Capacity
Tunis	Stade El Menzah	40,000
Tunis	Stade Chedly Zouiten	20,000

== Group stage ==
All times local : CET (UTC+1)

Key to colours in group tables
Advance to the Semifinals
Advance to the Second place group playoff

=== Group A ===
Team	Pld	W	D	L	GF	GA	GD	Pts
Italy B	3	2	0	1	6	2	+4	4
France Amateurs	3	2	0	1	6	5	+1	4
Algeria	3	1	0	2	4	6	−2	2
Morocco	3	1	0	2	2	5	−3	2

7 September 1967

France Amateurs	3–1	Algeria
Horlaville 14'; Hausser 31'; Akélian 55'		Achour 84'

Stade Chedly Zouiten, Tunis
Attendance: 10,000
Referee: Attig (Tunisia)
7 September 1967

Morocco	1–0	Italy B
Ghazouani 59'

Stade Chedly Zouiten, Tunis
Attendance: 10,000
Referee: Mustafa Gerçeker (Turkey)

9 September 1967

Italy B	2–0	Algeria
Savoldi 14' (pen.); Cresci 41'

Stade Chedly Zouiten, Tunis
Referee: Moncef Ben Ali (Tunisia)
10 September 1967

France Amateurs	2–0	Morocco
Horlaville 52'; Case 54'	(Report)

Stade Chedly Zouiten, Tunis

12 September 1967

Algeria	3–1	Morocco
Achour 21'; Lalmas 60'; Djemaâ 76'		Jarir 68'

Stade Chedly Zouiten, Tunis
Referee: ? (Turkey)
12 September 1967

Italy B	4–1	France Amateurs
Baisi 9'; Anastasi 50'; Fara 55' (pen.); Chiarugi 80'		Rivoire 65' (pen.)

Stade Chedly Zouiten, Tunis
Attendance: 22,000
Referee: Hédi Saoudi (Tunisia)

=== Group B ===
Team	Pld	W	D	L	GF	GA	GD	Pts
Turkey B	3	2	1	0	4	2	+2	5
Spain B	3	1	1	1	4	3	+1	3
Tunisia	3	1	1	1	4	3	+1	3
Libya	3	0	1	2	1	5	−4	1

8 September 1967

Tunisia	3–0	Libya
Madhi 34', 46'; Machouche 89'

Stade El Menzah, Tunis
Attendance: 40,000
9 September 1967

Turkey B	2–1	Spain B
Konca 14', 22'	Report	Alfonseda 68'

Stade El Menzah, Tunis
Referee: Alessandro D'Agostini (Italy)

11 September 1967

Turkey B	1–0	Libya
Mohammed 28' (o.g.)	Report

Taieb Mhiri Stadium, Sfax
11 September 1967

Tunisia	0–2	Spain B
		Huguet 4'; Alfonseda 17'

Stade El Menzah, Tunis
Attendance: 25,000
Referee: Abdelaziz Chekaïmi (Algeria)

13 September 1967

Tunisia	1–1	Turkey B
Chaïbi 18'	Report	Konca 36'

Stade El Menzah, Tunis
Attendance: 30,000
Referee: Robert Lacoste (France)
13 September 1967

Libya	1–1	Spain B
Al-Sanoussi 76'		Gabarró 30'

Stade El Menzah, Tunis
Referee: Alessandro D'Agostini (Italy)

Second place group playoff

14 September 1967

Tunisia	1–1	Spain B (c)
H. Akid 75'		Irureta 63'

Stade El Menzah, Tunis
Attendance: 40,000
Referee: Nejat Şener (Turkey)

Spain won coin toss.

== Knockout stage ==
Semifinals
15 September – Tunis
Italy B	2
Spain B	0
15 September – Tunis
Turkey B	0
France Amateurs	3

Final
17 September – Tunis
Italy B (a.e.t.)	0
France Amateurs	0
Third place
17 September – Tunis
Spain B	2
Turkey B	1

=== Semifinals ===
15 September 1967

Italy B	2–0	Spain B
Madariaga 23' (o.g.); Chiarugi 81'

Stade El Menzah, Tunis
Attendance: 15,000
Referee: Attig (Tunisia)

15 September 1967

Turkey B	0–3	France Amateurs
	Report	Verhoeve 33'; Hodoul 40'; Horlaville 66'

Stade El Menzah, Tunis
Attendance: 15,000
Referee: Abdelaziz Chekaïmi (Algeria)

=== Third place match ===
17 September 1967

Spain B	2–1	Turkey B
Gabarró 61'; Irureta 68'	Report	Karadoğan 56'

Stade El Menzah, Tunis
Referee: Alessandro D'Agostini (Italy)

=== Final ===
17 September 1967

Italy B	0–0 (a.e.t.)	France Amateurs
	Report

Stade El Menzah, Tunis
Attendance: 47,000
Referee: Mustapha Belakhouas (Tunisia)

Italy and France joint winners, the referee held a coin toss won by Italy, but the International Committee of Mediterranean Games (CIJM) annulled that decision and declared both teams winners.

== Tournament classification ==
Rank	Team	Pld	W	D	L	GF	GA	GD	Pts
1	Italy B	5	3	1	1	8	2	+6	7
1	France Amateurs	5	3	1	1	9	4	+5	7
3	Spain B	5	2	1	1	6	6	0	5
4	Turkey B	5	2	1	2	5	7	–2	5
Eliminated in the group stage
5	Tunisia	3	1	1	1	4	3	+1	3
6	Algeria	3	1	0	2	4	6	–2	2
7	Morocco	3	1	0	2	2	5	–3	2
8	Libya	3	0	1	2	1	5	–4	1

== Goalscorers ==
There were 41 goals scored in 17 matches, for an average of 2.41 goals per match.

3 goals

- (France) Daniel Horlaville
- (Turkey) Ender Konca

2 goals

- (Algeria) Hassan Achour
- (Italy) Luciano Chiarugi
- (Spain) Ramón Alfonseda
- (Spain) Javier Irureta
- (Spain) Gabarró
- (Tunisia) Amor Madhi

1 goal

- (Algeria) Hacène Djemaâ
- (Algeria) Hacène Lalmas
- (France) Stéphane Akélian
- (France) Marc-Kanyan Case
- (France) Gérard Hausser
- (France) Jean-Louis Hodoul
- (France) Jean-Louis Rivoire
- (France) Alain Verhoeve
- (Italy) Pietro Anastasi
- (Italy) Pietro Baisi
- (Italy) Franco Cresci
- (Italy) Mario Fara
- (Italy) Giuseppe Savoldi
- (Libya) Hassan Al-Sanoussi
- (Morocco) Maouhoub Ghazouani
- (Morocco) Houmane Jarir
- (Spain) José Bosch Huguet
- (Tunisia) Habib Akid
- (Tunisia) Tahar Chaïbi
- (Tunisia) Abdeljabar Machouche
- (Turkey) Faruk Karadoğan

1 own goal

- (Libya) Mohammed (against Turkey)
- (Spain) Clemente Iriarte (against Italy)
