= 1968 CONMEBOL Pre-Olympic Tournament Group 2 =

CONMEBOL Pre-Olympic Tournament group

Group 2 of the 1968 CONMEBOL Pre-Olympic Tournament took place from 19 to 27 March 1968. The group consisted of host nation Colombia, as well as Ecuador, Peru and Uruguay. The top two teams, Colombia and Uruguay, advanced to the final group.

== Standings ==
Pos	Team	Pld	W	D	L	GF	GA	GD	Pts	Qualification
1	Colombia	3	2	1	0	4	2	+2	5	Advance to final group
2	Uruguay	3	1	2	0	3	1	+2	4	Advance to final group
3	Peru	3	0	2	1	2	3	−1	2	
4	Ecuador	3	0	1	2	1	4	−3	1	

Source: RSSSF

== Matches ==
19 March 1968

Colombia	1–0	Ecuador
Santa 49'

Estadio El Campín, Bogotá
Attendance: 26,000
Referee: Airton Viera (Brazil)
19 March 1968

Uruguay	0–0	Peru

Estadio Pascual Guerrero, Cali
Attendance: 10,045
Referee: Antonio Vicuña (Chile)
22 March 1968

Colombia	2–1	Peru
Santa 15'; Mosquera 85'		González 18'

Estadio El Campín, Bogotá
Attendance: 56,600
Referee: Ivan Barrios (Venezuela)
22 March 1968

Uruguay	2–0	Ecuador
Brandon 41'; Prestes 85'

Estadio Pascual Guerrero, Cali
Attendance: 1,725
Referee: Ramírez Alvarez (Paraguay)
27 March 1968

Colombia	1–1	Uruguay
Retat 84'		Eugui 19'

Estadio El Campín, Bogotá
Attendance: 57,600
Referee: Antonio Vicuña (Chile)
27 March 1968

Peru	1–1	Ecuador
González (?)		Pérez (?)

Estadio Pascual Guerrero, Cali
Referee: Airton Viera (Brazil)

== Goalscorers ==
There were 10 goals scored in 6 matches, for an average of 1.67 goals per match.

2 goals

- (Colombia national football team) Gustavo Santa
- (Peru Olympic football team) Francisco González

1 goal

- (Colombia Olympic football team) Fabio Mosquera
- (Uruguay Olympic football team) Ricardo Brandon
- (Uruguay Olympic football team) Jorge Prestes
- (Uruguay Olympic football team) Héctor Hugo Eugui
- (Colombia Olympic football team) Eduardo Retat
- (Ecuador Olympic football team) Miguel Pérez
