= List of foreign Ligue 1 players: F =

This is a list of foreign players in the French Ligue 1, which commenced play in 1932. The following players must meet both of the following two criteria:

1. Have played at least one Ligue 1 game. Players who were signed by Ligue 1 clubs, but only played in lower league, cup and/or European games, or did not play in any competitive games at all, are not included.
2. Are considered foreign, i.e., outside France and its dependencies (Guadeloupe, Martinique, Reunion Island or French Polynesia), determined by the following:

A player is considered foreign if he is not eligible to play for the national teams of France.

More specifically,

- If a player has been capped on international level, the national team is used; if he has been capped by more than one country, the highest level (or the most recent) team is used. These include French players with dual citizenship. Players who played for France but came as foreign players (such as Miguel Ángel Lauri) are also listed.
- If a player has not been capped on international level, his country of birth is used, except those who were born abroad from French parents or moved to France at a young age, and those who clearly indicated to have switched his nationality to another nation.

Clubs listed are those that the player has played at least one Ligue 1 game for.

Seasons listed are those that the player has played at least one Ligue 1 game in. Note that seasons, not calendar years, are used. For example, "1992–95" indicates that the player has played in every season from 1992–93 to 1994–95, but not necessarily every calendar year from 1992 to 1995.

In bold: players still active in Ligue 1 and their respective teams in current season.

== Finland ==
- **Lukas Hradecky** – **Monaco** – 2025–
- Glen Kamara – Rennes – 2024–26
- Tuomas Ollila – Paris FC – 2025–26
- Nils Rikberg – Toulouse FC (1937) – 1953–57
- Aulis Rytkönen – Toulouse FC (1937) – 1953–60
- Naatan Skyttä – Toulouse – 2022–25
- Timo Stavitski – Caen – 2017–19
- Teemu Tainio – Auxerre – 1997–2005
- Jere Uronen – Brest – 2021–23

== French Guiana ==
Note: As it is an overseas department and region of the French Republic, French Guianan players listed here must meet the next conditions:

1. They have played with the French Guiana national team, which belongs to CONCACAF but not to FIFA.
2. They are not cap-tied to France or any other FIFA member association.
- Josué Albert – Clermont – 2021–22
- Ludovic Baal – Le Mans, Lens, Rennes, Brest – 2007–10, 2014–21
- Jean-Claude Darcheville – 1995–98, 2001–07, 2008–09
- Donovan Léon – Auxerre, Brest – 2011–12, 2019–20, 2022–23, 2024–26
- Kévin Rimane – Paris SG – 2015–16
- Yoann Salmier – RC Strasbourg, Troyes, Le Havre – 2017–18, 2021–25

== French players born abroad ==
Thus list includes the French players born outside France who represents (or at least they are eligible) France internationally: this means naturalized players and not, and players born in the Overseas department of France.

=== Born in the French Guiana ===
- Raoul Diagne – RC Paris, Toulouse FC (1937) – 1930–44
- **Odsonne Édouard** – Toulouse FC, **Lens** – 2016–17, 2025–
- Marc-Antoine Fortuné – Lille, Nancy – 2002–04, 2006–09
- Mike Maignan – Lille – 2015–21
- Florent Malouda – Châteauroux, Guingamp, Lyon, Metz – 1997–98, 2000–07, 2014–15
- Jean-Clair Todibo – Toulouse, Nice – 2018–19, 2020–24

=== Born in the French Polynesia ===
- Pascal Vahirua – Auxerre, Caen – 1984–95, 1996–97

=== Born in Guadeloupe ===
- Pegguy Arphexad – Lens, Lille – 1995–97
- Jeanuël Belocian – Rennes – 2021–24
- Jean-Michel Capoue – Cannes – 1991–92, 1993–98
- Jean-Pierre Cyprien – Le Havre, Saint-Étienne, Rennes, Marseille – 1987–88, 1990–94, 1995–96, 1999–2000
- Wylan Cyprien – Lens, Nice, Nantes – 2014–15, 2016–20, 2021–22
- Bernard Lambourde – Cannes, Bordeaux, Bastia – 1991–92, 1993–94, 1995–97, 2001–02
- Thomas Lemar – Caen, Monaco – 2014–18
- Vincent Marcel – Nice – 2016–18
- Lilian Thuram – Monaco – 1990–96
- Marius Trésor – Ajaccio, Marseille, Bordeaux – 1969–84

=== Born in the New Caledonia ===
- Marc-Kanyan Case – Bastia, Nîmes – 1969–75
- Moïse Gorendiawé – AC Ajaccio – 1967–70
- Simeï Ihily – Bastia – 1978–85
- Christian Karembeu – Nantes, Bastia – 1990–95, 2004–05
- Antoine Kombouaré – Nantes, Paris SG – 1983–95
- Jacques Zimako – Bastia, Saint-Étienne, Sochaux – 1972–85

=== Born in Réunion ===
- Didier Agathe – Montpellier – 1998–99
- **Ludovic Ajorque** – Strasbourg, **Brest** – 2018–23, 2024–
- Zacharie Boucher – Toulouse FC, Angers – 2013–15, 2018–19
- Guillaume Hoarau – Paris Saint-Germain, Bordeaux – 2008–14
- Dimitri Payet – Nantes, Saint-Étienne, Lille, Marseille – 2005–15, 2016–23
- Bertrand Robert – Montpellier, Lorient – 2001–04, 2007–09
- Laurent Robert – Montpellier, Paris SG – 1994–2002
- Ronny Rodelin – Nantes, Lille, Caen, Guingamp – 2008–09, 2011–19
- Florent Sinama Pongolle – Le Havre, Saint-Étienne – 2002–03, 2011–12
- Samuel Souprayen – Rennes, Dijon – 2010–12

=== Born outside the DOM ===
- (Ivory Coast) Samassi Abou – Lyon, Cannes – 1992–98
- (Ghana) Seth Adonkor – Nantes – 1981–85
- (Togo) Kodjo Afanou – Bordeaux – 1995–2006
- (Cameroon) Lucien Agoumé – Brest, Troyes – 2021–23
- (Iraq) Zana Allée – Rennes – 2013–14
- (Ivory Coast) Bernard Allou – Paris SG – 1994–98
- (Cameroon) Ibrahim Amadou – Nancy, Lille – 2012–13, 2015–18
- (Cameroon) Valentin Atangana – Reims – 2022–25
- (Senegal) Ibrahim Ba – Le Havre, Bordeaux, Marseille – 1992–97, 2001–02
- (Serbia) Ivan Bek – Saint-Étienne – 1935–39
- (Morocco) Larbi Benbarek – Marseille, Stade Français – 1938–39, 1946–48, 1953–55
- (Ivory Coast) **Emmanuel Biumla** – **Angers** – 2024–
- (Ivory Coast) Basile Boli – Auxerre, Marseille, Monaco – 1983–94, 1995–96
- (Scotland) Charles Boli – Lens – 2021–22
- (Ivory Coast) Roger Boli – Auxerre, Lille, Lens, Le Havre – 1984–89, 1991–97
- (Cameroon) Jean-Alain Boumsong – Le Havre, Auxerre, Lyon – 1997–2004, 2007–10
- (Angola) Eduardo Camavinga – Rennes – 2018–22
- (Monaco) Grégory Campi – Lille – 2002–03
- (Spain) Bruno Carotti – Montpellier, Nantes, Paris SG, Saint-Étienne, Toulouse – 1991–2004
- (Austria) René Charrier – Marseille, Paris FC – 1974–80
- (Guinea) Sidiki Chérif – Angers – 2024–26
- (Argentina) Néstor Combin – Lyon, Metz – 1959–64, 1970–73
- (Senegal) Karim Coulibaly – Nancy – 2012–13, 2016–17
- (Uruguay) Carlos Curbelo – Nancy, Nice – 1972–88
- (Senegal) Mouhamadou Dabo – Caen – 2004–10, 2011–17
- (Luxembourg) Julien Darui – Lille, Montpellier – 1937–40, 1942–43, 1944–45, 1953–54
- (Ghana) Marcel Desailly – Nantes, Marseille – 1987–94
- (Senegal) Oumar Dieng – Lille, Paris SG, Auxerre, Sedan – 1989–90, 1992–96, 1998–2000
- (Ivory Coast) Martin Djetou – Strasbourg, Monaco, Nice – 1992–2001, 2004–05
- (Cape Verde) Manuel dos Santos – Monaco, Montpellier, Marseille, Strasbourg – 1994–2004, 2005–08
- (Switzerland) Fabrice Ehret – Strasbourg, Evian – 1998–2001, 2002–04, 2011–14
- (Senegal) Patrice Evra – Monaco, Marseille – 2002–06, 2016–17
- (Senegal) Joachim Fernandez – Bordeaux, Caen, Toulouse – 1995–97, 1998–99
- (Spain) Luis Fernández – Paris SG, RC Paris, Cannes – 1980–93
- (Italy) Dario Grava – Strasbourg, Nice – 1968–77
- (West Germany) Patrick Guillou – Saint-Étienne, Sochaux – 1999–2000, 2001–02
- (Ivory Coast) Olivier Kapo – Auxerre, Monaco, US Boulogne – 1998–2004, 2005–06, 2009–10, 2011–12
- (Ivory Coast) Yann Karamoh – Caen, Bordeaux, Montpellier – 2016–17, 2018–19, 2023–24
- (Zaire) Jirès Kembo Ekoko – Rennes – 2006–13
- (Netherlands) Ferenc Kocsur – Nice, Saint-Étienne – 1949–61
- (Zaire) Peguy Luyindula – Strasbourg, Lyon, Marseille, Auxerre, Paris SG – 1998–2013
- (Zaire) Claude Makélélé – Nantes, Marseille, Paris SG – 1991–98, 2008–11
- (Belgium) Steed Malbranque – Lyon, Saint-Étienne, Caen – 1997–2001, 2011–17
- (Zaire) Steve Mandanda – Marseille, Rennes – 2007–16, 2017–25
- (Cameroon) Loïc Mbe Soh – Paris SG – 2018–20
- (Algeria) Hemza Mihoubi – Metz – 2004–06
- (Senegal) Samba N'Diaye – Lille, Metz, Nantes – 1992–96, 1997–99
- (Cameroon) Vincent Péricard – Saint-Étienne – 1999–2000
- (Angola) Julien Ponceau – Lorient – 2022–24
- (Argentina) Ángel Rambert – Lyon – 1968–70
- (Republic of the Congo) **Brice Samba** – Marseille, Caen, Lens, **Rennes** – 2013–14, 2017–19, 2022–
- (Senegal) Amara Simba – Paris SG, Cannes, Monaco, Caen, Lille – 1986–97
- (Poland) Henri Skiba
- (Chad) Loum Tchaouna – Rennes – 2021–22
- (Italy) Khéphren Thuram – Nice – 2019–24
- (Italy) Marcus Thuram – Guingamp – 2017–19
- (Mali) Jean Tigana – Lyon, Bordeaux, Marseille – 1978–91
- (Belgium) Adrien Truffert – Rennes – 2020–25
- (Hungary) Joseph Ujlaki – Nice, RC Paris, Metz – 1953–65
- (Cameroon) Samuel Umtiti – Lyon, Lille – 2011–16, 2023–24
- (Senegal) Patrick Vieira – Cannes – 1993–96
- (Central African Republic) Mapou Yanga-Mbiwa – Montpellier, Lyon – 2009–13, 2015–18

== Notes ==
1. Born in France
2. Born in Slovakia (then part of Czechoslovakia)
3. Capped for the France national under-21 football team

=== Books ===
- Barreaud, Marc (1998). Dictionnaire des footballeurs étrangers du championnat professionnel français (1932-1997). L'Harmattan, Paris. ISBN 2-7384-6608-7.
- Tamás Dénes; Pál Peterdi; Zoltán Rochy; József Selmeci (1999). Kalandozó magyar labdarúgók. ISBN 963-85967-0-8.

=== Club pages ===
- AJ Auxerre former players
- AJ Auxerre former players
- Girondins de Bordeaux former players
- Girondins de Bordeaux former players
- Les ex-Tangos (joueurs), Stade Lavallois former players
- Olympique Lyonnais former players
- Olympique de Marseille former players
- FC Metz former players
- AS Monaco FC former players
- Ils ont porté les couleurs de la Paillade... Montpellier HSC Former players
- AS Nancy former players
- FC Nantes former players
- Paris SG former players
- Red Star Former players
- Red Star former players
- Stade de Reims former players
- Stade Rennais former players
- CO Roubaix-Tourcoing former players
- AS Saint-Étienne former players
- Sporting Toulon Var former players

=== Others ===
- stat2foot
- footballenfrance
- French Clubs' Players in European Cups 1955-1995, RSSSF
- Finnish players abroad, RSSSF
- Italian players abroad, RSSSF
- Romanians who played in foreign championships
- Swiss players in France, RSSSF
- EURO 2008 CONNECTIONS: FRANCE, Stephen Byrne Bristol Rovers official site
