= 1968 CONMEBOL Pre-Olympic Tournament Group 1 =

CONMEBOL Pre-Olympic Tournament group

Group 1 of the 1968 CONMEBOL Pre-Olympic Tournament took place from 19 to 27 March 1968. The group consisted of Brazil, Chile, Paraguay, Venezuela. The top two teams, Paraguay and Brazil, advanced to the final group.

== Standings ==
Pos	Team	Pld	W	D	L	GF	GA	GD	Pts	Qualification
1	Paraguay	3	2	1	0	4	0	+4	5	Advance to final group
2	Brazil	3	1	2	0	3	0	+3	4	Advance to final group
3	Chile	3	1	1	1	1	1	0	3	
4	Venezuela	3	0	0	3	0	7	−7	0	

Source: RSSSF

== Matches ==
19 March 1968

Brazil	0–0	Paraguay

Estadio Atanasio Girardot, Medellín
Attendance: 16,205
Referee: Pablo Víctor Vaga (Uruguay)
19 March 1968

Venezuela	0–1	Chile
		Marchant 85'

Estadio Municipal, Barranquilla
Attendance: 2,200
Referee: Herwin Hiegers (Peru)
22 March 1968

Chile	0–1	Paraguay
		Martínez 43'

Estadio Atanasio Girardot, Medellín
Attendance: 6,164
Referee: Eduardo Rendón (Ecuador)
22 March 1968

Brazil	3–0	Venezuela
Dionísio (?); Maria (?); China (?)

Estadio Municipal, Barranquilla
Referee: Guillermo Velásquez Ramirez (Colombia)
27 March 1968

Brazil	0–0	Chile

Estadio Atanasio Girardot, Medellín
Referee: Herwin Hiegers (Peru)
27 March 1968

Venezuela	0–3	Paraguay
		Sosa (?); Martínez (?); Sandoval (?)

Estadio Municipal, Barranquilla
Referee: Pablo Víctor Vaga (Uruguay)

== Goalscorers ==
There were 8 goals scored in 6 matches, for an average of 1.33 goals per match.

2 goals

- (Paraguay Olympic football team) Francisco Martínez

1 goal

- (Chile Olympic football team) Luis Marchant
- (Brazil Olympic football team) Dionísio
- (Brazil Olympic football team) Manoel Maria
- (Brazil Olympic football team) China
- (Paraguay Olympic football team) Miguel Ángel Sosa
- (Paraguay Olympic football team) Benito Sandoval
