= Pasetti =

Pasetti is an Italian surname. Notable people with the surname include:

- Anna Pasetti, Italian pastellist active between 1800 and 1806
- Luigi Pasetti (born 1945), Italian footballer
- Nicolo Pasetti (born Nicolò Bernardino Pasetti Bombardella), American-Italian actor
- Peter Pasetti (1916–1996), German actor

== See also ==
- Fabienne Diato-Pasetti (born 1965), Monégasque sport shooter
