= Capoue =

Capoue is a surname. Notable people with the surname include:

- Aurélien Capoue (born 1982), French footballer
- Étienne Capoue (born 1988), French footballer, brother of Aurélien
- Jean-Michel Capoue (born 1972), French footballer
