= Charles Teamboueon =

New Caledonian footballer and manager (1939-2013)

Personal information
- Full name: Charles Teamboueon
- Date of birth: 6 December 1939
- Place of birth: Belep, New Caledonia
- Date of death: 11 February 2013 (aged 73)
- Place of death: New Caledonia
- Height: 1.75 m (5 ft 9 in)
- Position: Forward

Senior career*
Years	Team	Apps	(Gls)
1963–1966	Frégate de Saint-Louis		
1966–1972	Gazélec Ajaccio	41	(11)

International career
1965–1969	New Caledonia	9	
1968	France Olympic	4	(3)

Managerial career
- 2007–2009: A.S. Mont-Dore
- * Club domestic league appearances and goals

Charles Teamboueon (6 December 1939 – 11 February 2013) was a New Caledonian professional football player and manager.

== Career ==
Teamboueon won the New Caledonia Super Ligue in 1965 and 1966 with Frégate de Saint-Louis as a player-coach. In December 1966, he joined Gazélec Ajaccio, uniting with fellow New Caledonians Moïse Gorendiawé and Marc-Kanyan Case. The club won the Championnat de France amateur in 1968 and was promoted to the second professional division. Teamboueon finished his career in 1972 after several injuries and operations to the knee.

Teamboueon was selected for the first time for the New Caledonia national team in 1966. He was a finalist at the Pacific Games in 1966. Charles Teamboueon was part of the Olympic team representing France in the football tournament at the Olympic Summer Games 1968 in Mexico. He played in the group stage against the Guinea, Mexico (scoring a goal in the thirtieth minute), and Colombia (scoring a goal in the fifty-ninth minute). He was eliminated in the quarter-finals, losing 3–1 to Japan, scoring the only French goal in the thirty-second minute.

In the 1960s, Teamboueon was a player-coach at Frégate de Saint-Louis. After 27 years spent working with the same company in France, Teamboueon encountered several bureaucratic issues on his return to New Caledonia, finally returning for good in 2005 with his wife. In 2007, he coached A.S. Mont-Dore.

On 11 February 2013, he died after a long battle with cancer.

== Honours ==
- Pacific Games: 1

finalist: 1966

- New Caledonia Championship: 2

1965, 1966

- New Caledonia Cup: 1

finalist: 2007

- Championnat de France amateur de football: 1

1968
