= Ibrahima Fofana =

Ibrahima Fofana may refer to:

- Ibrahima Breze Fofana, Guinean footballer
- Ibrahima Fofana (footballer, born 1946), Guinean footballer
- Ibrahima Fofana (trade unionist), Guinean trade unionist
- Ibrahima Kalil Fofana, Guinean basketball player
- Ibrahima Kassory Fofana, Guinean politician

== See also ==
- Ibrahim Fofana, Ivorian footballer
