= Oscar Munoz =

Oscar Munoz may refer to:

- Oscar Muñoz (artist) (born 1951), Colombian artist
- Oscar Munoz (baseball) (born 1969), American baseball player
- Oscar Munoz (magician), American magician
- Oscar Munoz (executive) (born 1959), CEO of United Airlines
- Oscar Muñoz (wrestler) (born 1964), Colombian Olympic wrestler
- Oscar Muñoz (footballer), Colombian Olympic football (soccer) player
- Óscar Muñoz, Colombian taekwondo practitioner
