= Mamadouba Soumah =

Guinean footballer

Personal information
- Date of birth: 1942 (age 83–84)
- Place of birth: Kindia, Guinea
- Position: Defender

International career
Years	Team	Apps	(Gls)
- Guinea

Mamadouba Soumah (born 1942) is a Guinean former footballer. He competed in the men's tournament at the 1968 Summer Olympics.
