= Fodé Bouya Camara =

Guinean footballer (born 1946)

Personal information
- Date of birth: 1946 (age 79–80)
- Place of birth: Conakry, Guinea
- Position: Midfielder

International career
Years	Team	Apps	(Gls)
- Guinea

Fodé Bouya Camara (born 1946) is a Guinean former footballer. He competed in the men's tournament at the 1968 Summer Olympics.
