= Amadou Sankon =

Guinean footballer (born 1943)

Personal information
- Date of birth: 1943 (age 82–83)
- Place of birth: Bojja, Guinea
- Position: Defender

International career
Years	Team	Apps	(Gls)
- Guinea

Amadou Sankon (born 1943) is a Guinean former footballer. He competed in the men's tournament at the 1968 Summer Olympics.
