= Ali Badara Dia =

Guinean footballer

Personal information
- Date of birth: 1941 (age 84–85)
- Place of birth: Conakry, Guinea
- Position: Forward

International career
Years	Team	Apps	(Gls)
- Guinea

Ali Badara Dia (born 1941) is a Guinean former footballer. He competed in the men's tournament at the 1968 Summer Olympics.
