= Dionísio (footballer, born 1947) =

Brazilian footballer

Personal information
- Full name: Carlos Dionísio de Brito
- Date of birth: 9 July 1947
- Place of birth: Corumbá, Brazil
- Date of death: 24 September 2014 (aged 67)
- Place of death: Rio de Janeiro, Brazil
- Height: 1.73 m (5 ft 8 in)
- Position: Forward

Youth career
- Flamengo

Senior career*
Years	Team	Apps	(Gls)
1967–1972	Flamengo	164	(61)
1971	→ Bahia (loan)		
1973	Fluminense	58	(33)
1974	Sampaio Corrêa		
1974	Grêmio	10	(1)
1975–1977	Americano		

International career
1968	Brazil Olympic	3	(1)
- * Club domestic league appearances and goals as of 28 May 2024

Carlos Dionísio de Brito (9 July 1947 – 24 September 2014), simply known as Dionísio, was a Brazilian professional footballer who played as a forward.

== Career ==
A striker specializing in headed goals, Dionísio received the nickname "Bode Atômico" (English: Atomic Goat) at Flamengo. He played 164 matches and scored 61 for the club, in addition to the state title in 1972. In 1973 he was champion again, this time with Fluminense. He also had spells at Sampaio Corrêa, Grêmio and Americano, where he ended his career. He was also part of the Brazil team that won the Pre-Olympic tournament in 1968.

== Honours ==
Flamengo

- Campeonato Carioca: 1972
- Torneio do Povo: 1972
- Taça Guanabara: 1970

Fluminense

- Campeonato Carioca: 1973

Americano

- Campeonato da Cidade de Campos: 1975, 1977

Brazil Olympic

- CONMEBOL Pre-Olympic Tournament: 1968

== Death ==
Dionísio died on 24 September 2014, in the city of Rio de Janeiro.
