= Daniel Périgaud =

French footballer (born 1943)

Personal information
- Date of birth: 19 December 1943 (age 82)
- Place of birth: Bénévent, France

International career
Years	Team	Apps	(Gls)
- France

Daniel Périgaud (born 19 December 1943) is a French footballer. He competed in the men's tournament at the 1968 Summer Olympics.
