= Francolino =

Coordinates: 44°54′18″N 11°39′38″E

Francolino is a frazione of Ferrara, Italy. It is located about 10 miles (16 km) northeast of central Ferrara on the southern bank of the Po River.

It was sometimes previously known as Francolini.

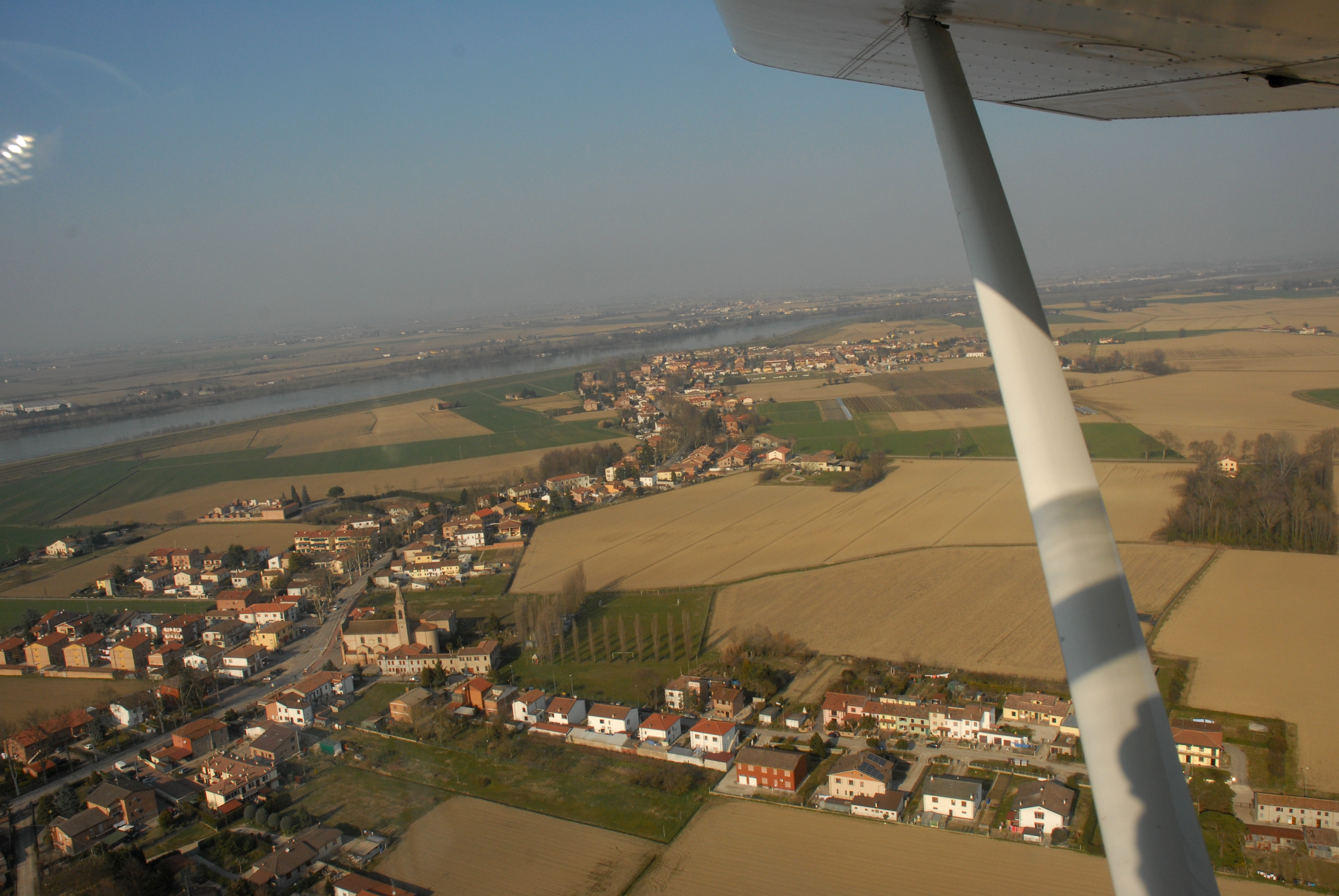
Aerial view of the village
