= Luigi Pasetti =

Italian footballer

Personal information
- Date of birth: 9 September 1945 (age 81)
- Place of birth: Francolino, Italy
- Height: 1.67 m (5 ft 5 1/2 in)
- Position: Defender

Senior career*
Years	Team	Apps	(Gls)
1962–1968	SPAL	111	(1)
1968–1969	Juventus	19	(1)
1969–1974	Palermo	101	(1)
1974–1976	Piacenza	57	(1)
1976–1980	Adriese		
- * Club domestic league appearances and goals

Luigi Pasetti (born 9 September 1945, in Francolino) is an Italian former professional footballer who played as a defender.
