= Alain Laurier =

French footballer (1944–2023)

Personal information
- Date of birth: 12 September 1944
- Place of birth: Créteil, France
- Date of death: 25 December 2023 (aged 79)
- Height: 1.76 m (5 ft 9 in)
- Position: Midfielder

Youth career
- –1965: Champigny-Cœuilly

Senior career*
Years	Team	Apps	(Gls)
1965–1972	Reims		
1972–1974	Paris FC		
1974–1976	Angers		
1976–1979	Le Mans		
1979–1982	Caen		

Managerial career
- 1976–1979: Le Mans
- 1979–1983: Caen
- 1983–1986: AS Poissy
- 1986–1989: Grenoble
- 1990–1994: Istres
- 1996–1997: Dijon
- 1997–1998: Al Wasl
- 1999–2000: Al Wasl
- 2000–2001: Shenyang Jinde
- 2002–2004: Qatar (technical director)
- * Club domestic league appearances and goals

Alain Laurier (French pronunciation: [alɛ̃ loʁje]) (12 September 1944 – 25 December 2023) was a French football manager and player.

== Career ==
Laurier was born in Créteil (Val-de-Marne). He made his debut for Cœuilly, which became Reims. At the Champigny club, he played alongside big names such as Raymond Kopa and Lucien Muller. He played his first match in the championship alongside professionals on 17 October 1965. He took part in the return of the club to the top-flight in 1970. Two years later, he was signed by Paris FC, who had returned to Division 1. However, the Parisian club were relegated again two years later. Laurier then joined Angers, without further success. He spent two seasons with the club in Division 2.

In 1976, Laurier began his conversion to management. He became manager (DEPF), while continuing as a player at Le Mans. He continued as a player-manager at Caen, retiring as a player in his last season at the Normandy club. He then coached Poissy, Grenoble, Istres and Dijon, as well as clubs in Dubai and China. From 2002 to 2004, he was technical director of the Qatar national team.

== Death ==
Laurier died on 25 December 2023, at the age of 79.

== Honours ==
- Amateur and military international
- Took part in 1968 Mexico Olympics
- Champion of France D2 in 1966 with Reims
- Best manager in D2 in 1991 with Istres (awarded by France-Football magazine)

== Publications ==
- Football "Culture tactique et principes de jeu", Chiron Sports, 1975
- "Perfectionnement pour l'élite" in Arabic for the Qatar Football Federation in 2003
