= Bernard Goueffic =

French footballer (born 1947)

Personal information
- Date of birth: 29 January 1947 (age 79)
- Place of birth: Saint-Brieuc, France
- Height: 1.77 m (5 ft 9 1/2 in)
- Position: Defender

Youth career
- 1957–1966: Stade Briochin

Senior career*
| Years | Team | Apps | (Gls) |
| 1966–1973 | Rennes | | |
| 1973–1976 | FC Lorient | | |
| 1976–1978 | Amicale de Lucé | | |
| 1978–1980 | FC Lorient | | |
| 1980–1982 | CO Briochin | | |

Managerial career
- 1976–1977: Amicale de Lucé
- 1978–1980: FC Lorient
- 1980–1982: CO Briochin
- * Club domestic league appearances and goals

Bernard Goueffic (born 29 January 1947) is a French former professional footballer who played for Rennes, FC Lorient, Amicale de Lucé and CO Briochin.

Goueffic also enjoyed a career as a manager with Amicale de Lucé, FC Lorient and CO Briochin.
