= Negm El-Din Hassan =

Sudanese footballer

Personal information
- Full name: Negm El-Din Hassan
- Date of birth: 1945
- Place of birth: Bahri, Sudan
- Date of death: 21 November 2013 (aged 68)
- Place of death: Sharjah, UAE

Youth career
- –1960: Al-Nesr

Senior career*
Years	Team	Apps	(Gls)
1960–1974	Al Neel SC (Khartoum)	–	(–)
1971	Al-Merrikh SC (loan)		
1974–1978	Sharjah	–	(–)

International career
1963–1974	Sudan	105	(–)
Medal record
Men's football
Representing Sudan
Africa Cup of Nations
Winner	1970 Sudan
- * Club domestic league appearances and goals

Negm El-Din Hassan (Arabic: نجم الدين حسن) nicknamed Negmu; (1945 – 21 November 2013) was a Sudanese footballer. He competed in the men's tournament at the 1972 Summer Olympics.

== Honours ==
Sudan

- African Cup of Nations: 1970
