= Humberto Medina (footballer) =

Mexican footballer (1942-2011)

Personal information
- Born: 5 September 1942 Guadalajara, Jalisco
- Died: 24 November 2011 (aged 69)
Medal record
Football
Pan American Games
Representing Mexico
Gold medal – first place	1967 Winnipeg	Football

Humberto Medina (5 September 1942 – 24 November 2011) was a Mexican footballer. He was born in Guadalajara, Jalisco. He competed at the 1968 Summer Olympics in Mexico City, where Mexico placed fourth.
