= Mamadi Sano =

Guinean footballer

Personal information
- Date of birth: 1944 (age 81–82)
- Place of birth: Kinidelgom, Guinea
- Position: Goalkeeper

International career
Years	Team	Apps	(Gls)
- Guinea

Mamadi Sano (born 1944) is a Guinean former footballer. He competed in the men's tournament at the 1968 Summer Olympics.
