= Michel Parmentier =

French footballer (1948–2025)

Personal information
- Full name: Michel Marcel Adrien Parmentier
- Date of birth: 1 April 1948
- Place of birth: Le Houlme, France
- Date of death: 6 November 2025 (aged 77)
- Place of death: Bois-Guillaume, France

Senior career*
Years	Team	Apps	(Gls)
1967-1972	Quevilly		

International career
1968	France Olympic	1	(0)
- * Club domestic league appearances and goals

Michel Parmentier (1 April 1948 – 6 November 2025) was a French footballer. He competed in the men's tournament at the 1968 Summer Olympics. He died on 6 November 2025, at the age of 77.
