= Mahmoud Said Salim =

Sudanese footballer

Mahmoud Saeed Salem
Personal information
- Full name: Mahmoud Saeed Salem Alsayed
- Date of birth: 1947 (age 78–79)
- Place of birth: Bahri, Sudan
- Position: Right-back

Youth career
- –1965: Al-Tedkar

Senior career*
Years	Team	Apps	(Gls)
1965–1975	Al-Tahrir		
1971	Al-Merrikh SC (loan)		
1975–1979	Abu Dhabi SC		

International career
1966–197?	Sudan	75	
Medal record
Men's football
Representing Sudan
Africa Cup of Nations
Winner	1970 Sudan
- * Club domestic league appearances and goals

Mahmoud Saeed Salem Alsayed (Arabic: محمود سعيد سالم) nicknamed James (born 1947) is a Sudanese footballer who played as a defender. He competed in the men's tournament at the 1972 Summer Olympics. Mahmoud Said Salim was nicknamed James by his sister because he was a fan of cinema, especially James Bond.

== Honours ==
Sudan

- African Cup of Nations: 1970
