= Federico Sicard =

Colombian swimmer

Personal information
- Born: 19 February 1950 (age 76) Cali, Colombia

Sport
- Sport: Swimming

Federico Sicard (born 19 February 1950) is a Colombian former swimmer. He competed in four events at the 1968 Summer Olympics.
