= Lauro de Mello =

Brazilian footballer

Lauro
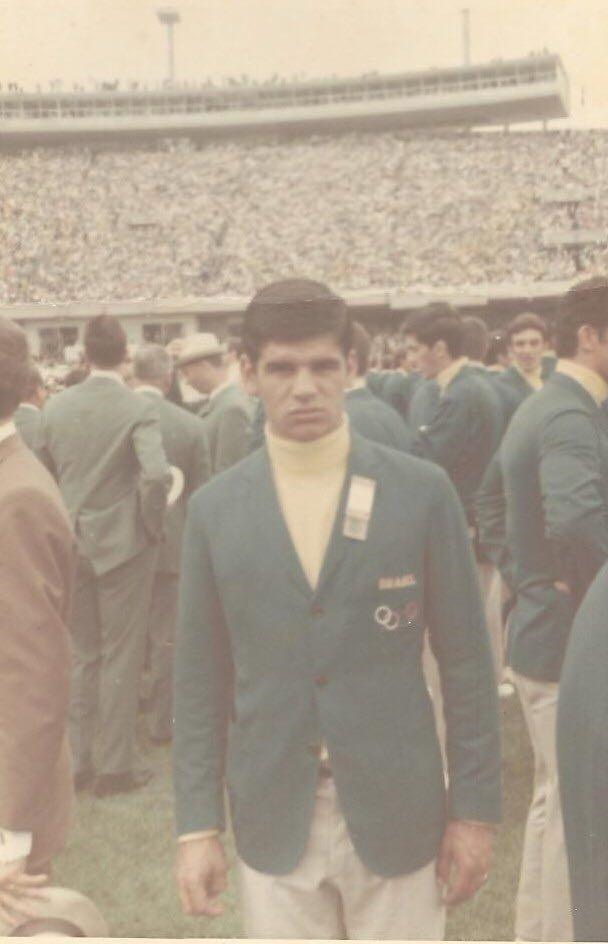

Personal information
- Full name: Lauro de Mello
- Date of birth: 12 September 1944 (age 82)
- Place of birth: São Paulo, Brazil
- Height: 1.68 m (5 ft 6 in)
- Position: Midfielder

Youth career
- 1967–1968: Palmeiras

Senior career*
| Years | Team | Apps | (Gls) |
| 1967–1969 | Palmeiras | 8 | (3) |

International career
| 1968 | Brazil Olympic | 4 | (2) |
- * Club domestic league appearances and goals

Lauro de Mello (born 12 September 1944) is a Brazilian former footballer who played as a midfielder.

== Club career ==
Trained in the youth sectors at Palmeiras, he played from 1967 to 1969, in Campeonato Paulista matches.

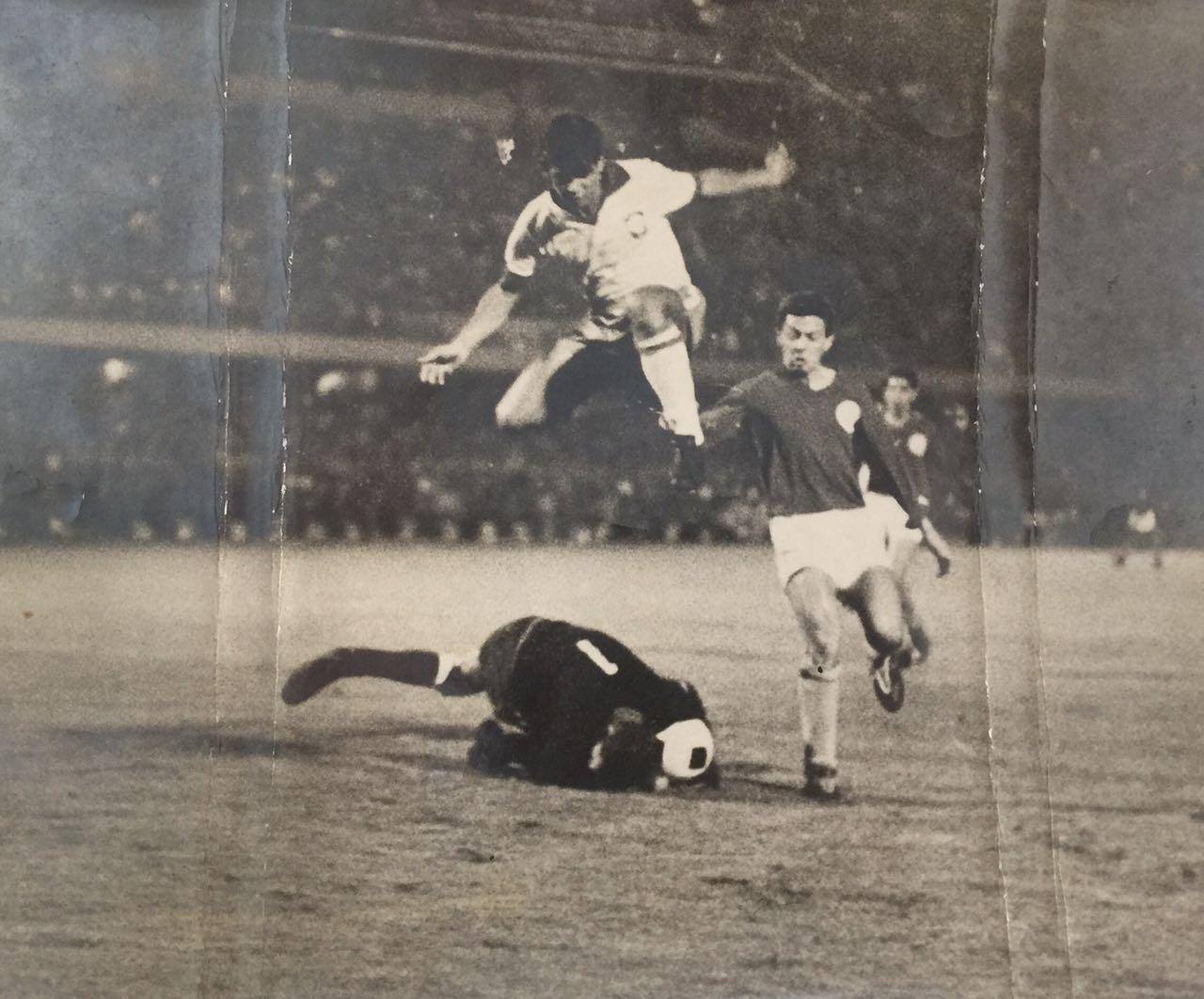
De Mello at a match in the 1960s

== International career ==
In 1968, Lauro was part of the Brazil Olympic team that won the Pre-Olympic Tournament and disputed the 1968 Olympic Games, in Mexico City.

== Honours ==
Brazil Olympic

- CONMEBOL Pre-Olympic Tournament: 1968
