= Ricardo González (swimmer) =

Colombian swimmer (born 1947)

Personal information
- Born: 17 March 1947 (age 79) Cartagena del Chairá, Colombia

Sport
- Sport: Swimming

Ricardo González (born 17 March 1947) is a Colombian former swimmer. He competed in four events at the 1968 Summer Olympics.
