= Pedro Ospina (footballer) =

Colombian footballer (born 1944)

Personal information
- Full name: Pedro Nelson Ospina
- Date of birth: 5 January 1945 (age 81)
- Place of birth: Cali, Colombia
- Height: 1.68 m (5 ft 6 in)

International career
Years	Team	Apps	(Gls)
- Colombia

Pedro Ospina (born 5 January 1945) is a Colombian footballer. He competed in the men's tournament at the 1968 Summer Olympics.
