= Hassan Achour =

Algerian footballer and manager (1938–2020)

Achour
Personal information
- Full name: Hassan Louahdi
- Date of birth: March 14, 1938
- Place of birth: Sétif, Algeria
- Date of death: September 17, 2020 (aged 82)
- Place of death: Algiers, Algeria
- Position: Winger

Youth career
- CA Belcourt

Senior career*
Years	Team	Apps	(Gls)
- CA Belcourt
1956–1962	OMR El Annasser		
1962–1972	CA Belcourt		

International career
1965–1969	Algeria	16	(4)

Managerial career
- CR Belouizdad
- UPC Salembier
- CNAN
- JSM Chéraga
- * Club domestic league appearances and goals

Hassan Louahdi nicknamed Achour (14 March 1938 – 17 September 2020) was an Algerian international footballer and manager.

== Biography ==
He was born in Sétif. He won 16 caps for the Algeria national team and was part of Algeria's squad at the 1968 African Cup of Nations in Ethiopia.

He died in Algiers, aged 82.
