= Morlaye Camara =

Guinean footballer

Personal information
- Full name: Fory Morlaye Camara
- Date of birth: 1933
- Place of birth: Kindia, Guinea
- Date of death: 13 August 2018 (aged 81–82)
- Place of death: Conakry, Guinea
- Position: Goalkeeper

International career
| Years | Team | Apps | (Gls) |
| 1960-1971 | Guinea | 35 | (0) |

Morlaye Camara (1933 – 13 August 2018) was a Guinean footballer. He competed in the men's tournament at the 1968 Summer Olympics.
