= Sékou Condé (footballer, born 1943) =

Guinean footballer

Personal information
- Date of birth: 1943 (age 82–83)
- Place of birth: Conakry, Guinea
- Position: Defender

International career
Years	Team	Apps	(Gls)
1969-1975	Guinea	21	(0)

Sékou Condé (born 1943) is a Guinean former footballer. He competed in the men's tournament at the 1968 Summer Olympics.
