= Otoniel Quintana =

Colombian footballer (1946-2018)

Personal information
- Full name: Otoniel Quintana Rojas
- Date of birth: 23 August 1946
- Place of birth: Popayán, Colombia
- Date of death: 18 March 2018 (aged 71)
- Place of death: Padilla, Colombia
- Height: 1.73 m (5 ft 8 in)
- Position: Goalkeeper

Youth career
- Millonarios

Senior career*
Years	Team	Apps	(Gls)
1964–1973	Millonarios	131	(0)
1974–1976	Atlético Nacional	20	(0)
1977	Once Caldas	7	(0)
Total		158	(0)

International career
1967–1973	Colombia	4	(0)
- * Club domestic league appearances and goals

Otoniel Quintana (23 August 1946 – 18 March 2018) was a Colombian footballer. He competed in the men's tournament at the 1968 Summer Olympics.
