= Adalberto Escobar =

Paraguayan footballer (1949-2011)

Personal information
- Full name: Jorge Adalberto Escobar López
- Date of birth: 23 April 1949
- Place of birth: Asunción, Paraguay
- Date of death: 26 June 2011 (aged 62)
- Place of death: Asunción, Paraguay
- Height: 6 ft 1 in (1.85 m)
- Position: Midfielder

International career
| Years | Team | Apps | (Gls) |
| 1969–1979 | Paraguay | 20 | (4) |

Adalberto Escobar (23 April 1949 – 26 June 2011) was a Paraguayan footballer. He played in 20 matches for the Paraguay national football team from 1969 to 1979. He was also part of Paraguay's squad for the 1979 Copa América tournament.
