= Alberto Escobar =

Colombian footballer (born 1947)

Personal information
- Full name: Alberto Escobar Villa
- Date of birth: 1947 (age 78–79)
- Place of birth: Cali, Colombia
- Height: 1.76 m (5 ft 9 in)
- Position: Defender

International career
Years	Team	Apps	(Gls)
- Colombia

Alberto Escobar Villa (born 1947) is a Colombian footballer. He competed in the men's tournament at the 1968 Summer Olympics.
