= Decio López =

Colombian footballer

Personal information
- Date of birth: 1946 (age 79–80)
- Place of birth: Medellín, Colombia
- Position: Defender

International career
Years	Team	Apps	(Gls)
- Colombia

Decio López (born 1946) is a Colombian footballer. He competed in the men's tournament at the 1968 Summer Olympics.
