= Ramiro Viáfara =

Colombian footballer (born 1947)

Personal information
- Full name: Ramiro Viáfara Quintana
- Date of birth: 13 February 1947 (age 79)
- Place of birth: Puerto Tejada, Colombia
- Height: 1.75 m (5 ft 9 in)
- Position: Midfielder

International career
Years	Team	Apps	(Gls)
- Colombia

Ramiro Viáfara (born 13 February 1947) is a Colombian footballer. He competed in the men's tournament at the 1968 Summer Olympics.
