= Gabriel Berdugo =

Colombian footballer (born 1947)

Personal information
- Full name: Gabriel Berdugo García
- Date of birth: 26 November 1947 (age 78)
- Place of birth: Barranquilla, Colombia
- Height: 1.78 m (5 ft 10 in)
- Position: Centre-back

Senior career*
Years	Team	Apps	(Gls)
1968–1972	América de Cali		
1973–1978	Junior		
1979	Unión Magdalena	54	(2)
1980–1981	Junior		
1982–1984	Cristal Caldas		
Total		733	(?)

International career
1968–1977	Colombia	4	(0)
- * Club domestic league appearances and goals

Gabriel Berdugo García (born 26 November 1947) is a Colombian footballer. He competed in the men's tournament at the 1968 Summer Olympics.

Sporting positions
Preceded by Dulio Miranda	Atlético Junior captain 1974-1982	Succeeded by Dulio Miranda
