= Eduardo Retat =

Colombian footballer (born 1948)

Personal information
- Full name: Eduardo Julián Retat Torres
- Date of birth: 16 June 1948 (age 78)
- Position: Forward

International career
Years	Team	Apps	(Gls)
1975–1977	Colombia	10	(1)

Eduardo Julián Retat Torres (born 16 June 1948) is a Colombian former footballer. He played in ten matches for the Colombia national football team from 1975 to 1977. He was also part of Colombia's squad for the 1975 Copa América tournament.
