= Maxime Camara =

Guinean footballer

Personal information
- Full name: Mamadouba Resmu Camara
- Date of birth: 4 February 1945
- Place of birth: Kissidougou, Guinea
- Date of death: 29 March 2016 (aged 71)
- Place of death: Rabat, Morocco
- Height: 1.70 m (5 ft 7 in)
- Position: Midfielder

Senior career*
Years	Team	Apps	(Gls)
1960–1972	Hafia		

International career
1968	Guinea U23	3	(1)
1967–1974	Guinea	24	(5)
- * Club domestic league appearances and goals

Mamadouba Resmu Camara nicknamed Maxime Camara (4 February 1945 – 29 March 2016) was a Guinea international football midfielder.

== Career ==
Born in Kissidougou, Camara played club football for local side Hafia F.C. in the 1960s and 1970s. He helped the club win the 1972 African Cup of Champions Clubs.

Camara represented Guinea at the 1968 Summer Olympics in Mexico City. He also made several appearances for the senior Guinea national football team, including four FIFA World Cup qualifying matches, and played at the 1976 African Cup of Nations finals.

== Personal ==
On 24 April 1974 he married Aminata Touré, the daughter of the Guinean President Ahmed Sekou Touré. They have 4 children.

Camara became seriously ill while living in Guinea in 2005. He was then evacuated to Morocco where he died on 29 March 2016.
