= Alfredo Arango (footballer) =

Colombian footballer (1945-2005)

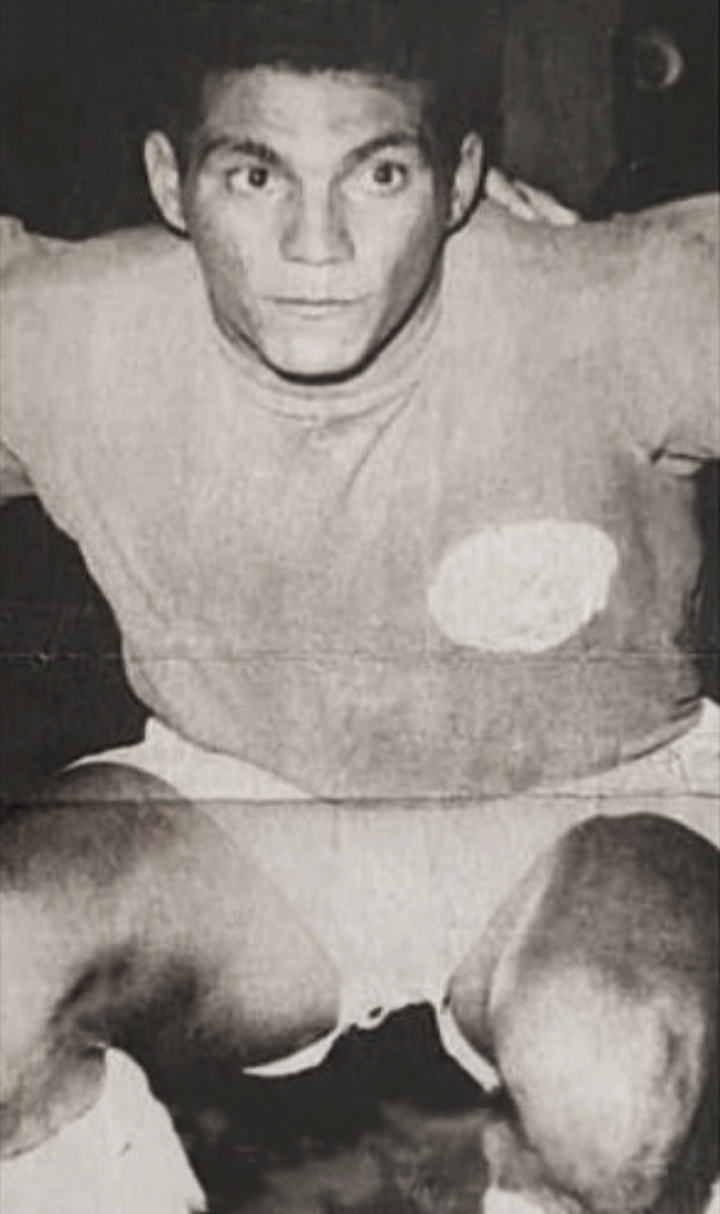

Personal information
- Full name: Alfredo Arango Narváez
- Date of birth: 16 February 1945
- Place of birth: Santa Marta, Colombia
- Date of death: 20 December 2005 (aged 60)
- Place of death: Santa Marta, Colombia
- Height: 1.70 m (5 ft 7 in)
- Position: Midfielder

Senior career*
Years	Team	Apps	(Gls)
1965–1972	Unión Magdalena		
1972–1973	Millonarios		
1974	Unión Magdalena		
1975–1976	Bucaramanga		
1977	Junior		
1978–1980	Unión Magdalena		

International career
1968	Colombia Olympic	3	(0)
- * Club domestic league appearances and goals

Alfredo Arango Narváez (16 February 1945 – 20 December 2005) was a Colombian international footballer. He competed for the Colombia national football team at the 1968 Summer Olympics.

== Career ==
Born in Santa Marta, Arango played professional football in Colombia. The midfielder spent most of his playing career with Unión Magdalena. He won the Colombian league title with Unión in 1968, and is the club's all-time leading goal-scorer with 104 total goals. He also won league titles with Millonarios (1972) and Atlético Junior (1977).

Arango played for the Colombia national football team at the 1968 Summer Olympics in Mexico City.

== Personal ==
In December 2005, Arango died in his home city of Santa Marta.

== Honours ==
Unión Magdalena

- Campeonato Colombiano (1): 1968

Millonarios

- Campeonato Colombiano (1): 1972

Atlético Junior

- Campeonato Colombiano (1): 1977

=== Individual ===
- All-time top scorer in Unión Magdalena (112 goals)
