= Héctor Hugo Eugui =

Uruguayan footballer and manager (born 1947)

Personal information
- Full name: Héctor Hugo Eugui Simoncelli
- Date of birth: 18 February 1947 (age 79)
- Place of birth: Mercedes, Uruguay
- Position: Forward

Senior career*
Years	Team	Apps	(Gls)
- Bristol de Mercedes
1969	Nacional		
1970	Cerro		
1971	Argentinos Juniors		
1972–1978	Toluca		
1978–1980	Tigres	41	(3)

Managerial career
- 1981–1982: Monterrey
- 1984–1985: Jaibos Tampico Madero
- 1987–1987: UAT
- 1989–1991: Cobras
- 1991–1993: UAT
- 1994–1995: Deportivo Irapuato
- 1995–1997: Real España
- 1999: Veracruz
- 1999: Comunicaciones
- 2000–2002: Atlético Mexiquense
- 2001: Toluca (interim)
- 2008–2009: Indios
- 2011: Puebla
- 2011: Toluca
- 2012: Tecos UAG
- 2017–2018: UAEM
- 2025: UAT
- * Club domestic league appearances and goals

Héctor Hugo Eugui Simoncelli (born 18 February 1947) is a Uruguayan football manager and former player. He played as a forward, and was a notable player with Deportivo Toluca.

== Club career ==
Born in Mercedes, Eugui began playing football with Bristol de Mercedes. Soon, he joined Club Nacional de Football, where he won the 1969 Uruguayan Primera División, and C.A. Cerro in 1970. Eugui had a brief stint in Argentina with Argentinos Juniors before moving to Mexico in 1972, where he scored a goal in the semi-finals of the 1972 CONCACAF Champions' Cup and won the league with Deportivo Toluca F.C. in 1974–75.

== Managerial career ==
After retiring from playing, Eugui became a football manager. During his time at Ciudad Juarez, Eugui helped ht team not to be relegated to Primera A, and the team advanced to the Clausura 2009 semifinals after they eliminated defending champions Club Toluca, but they were eliminated by CF Pachuca by an aggregate score of 4–3. For the next tournament after 10 games and only just tied four games and lost six without a win he was sacked. He managed Ciudad Juarez in 44 games, won 12, tied 12 and lost 15.

On 17 May 2011, Eugui was named the new coach of Toluca for the Apertura 2011 season. In 17 games, he managed to win four, tie eight, and lose win games. After the season ended, Eugui was sacked from the team.

On 13 November 2017, he was named the manager of Potros UAEM for the Clausura 2018 season. At the end of the season Eugui left his post at UAEM and announced his retirement.

In November 2024, Eugui returned to coaching activity when he was appointed manager of Correcaminos UAT, occupying the position for the third time. In September 2025 he was sacked due to poor results.

== Radio ==
Currently, Hector Hugo Eugui hosts a radio show in El Paso, TX on KAMA-750AM with co-host and analyst former player Miguel Murillo
