= Ibrahima Fofana (footballer, born 1946) =

Guinean footballer (born 1946)

Personal information
- Date of birth: 1946 (age 79–80)
- Place of birth: Kindia, Guinea

International career
Years	Team	Apps	(Gls)
1968–1977	Guinea	30	(0)

Ibrahima "Calva" Fofana (born 1946) is a Guinean former footballer. He competed in the men's tournament at the 1968 Summer Olympics.
