= Moïse Gorendiawé =

Caledonian footballer (1938–2001)

Personal information
- Full name: Moïse Gorendiawé
- Date of birth: 11 July 1938
- Place of birth: Ponérihouen, New Caledonia
- Date of death: 3 April 2001 (aged 62)
- Place of death: Ajaccio, France
- Height: 1.70 m (5 ft 7 in)
- Positions: Defensive midfielder; defender

Senior career*
Years	Team	Apps	(Gls)
1963–1965	Gazélec Ajaccio		
1965–1970	AC Ajaccio	107	(1)
1970–1977	Gazélec Ajaccio	157	(9)
- * Club domestic league appearances and goals

Moïse Gorendiawé (11 July 1938 – 3 April 2001) was a New Caledonian professional footballer who played as a defensive midfielder or defender. He spent his career playing in Corsica.
