= Jean-Michel Capoue =

French footballer (born 1972)

Personal information
- Full name: Jean-Michel Capoue
- Date of birth: 18 September 1972 (age 54)
- Place of birth: Pointe-à-Pitre, Guadeloupe
- Height: 1.73 m (5 ft 8 in)
- Position: Midfielder

Senior career*
Years	Team	Apps	(Gls)
1990–1991	Chamois Niortais B	14	(1)
1991–2000	Cannes	143	(7)
2001–2002	FC Laleu La Rochelle	?	(?)
2002–2003	Leyton Orient	0	(0)
2004	Fisher Athletic	3	(0)
2004–2005	Greenwich Borough	?	(?)
2005–2006	AS Evry	?	(?)
2006–2007	Gazélec Ajaccio	7	(1)
2007–2008	Angoulême CFC	?	(?)
2008–2009	L'Entente SSG	20	(0)
- * Club domestic league appearances and goals

Jean-Michel Capoue (born 18 September 1972) is a French former professional footballer who played as a midfielder. He represented 10 different French and English clubs in a career spanning almost 20 years. While playing for AS Cannes, he appeared in both the UEFA Cup and the UEFA Intertoto Cup.

== Bibliography ==
- Jean-Michel Capoue at WorldFootball.net
- Jean-Michel Capoue career statistics at chamoisfc79.fr
- Jean-Michel Capoue profile at foot-national.com
