= Javier Tamayo =

Colombian footballer (born 1950)

Personal information
- Full name: Javier Antonio Tamayo Hoyoso
- Date of birth: 16 March 1950 (age 76)
- Place of birth: Medellín, Colombia
- Height: 1.65 m (5 ft 5 in)
- Position: Forward

Senior career*
Years	Team	Apps	(Gls)
1968–1969	Independiente Medellín		
1969–1970	América de Cali		
1970	Independiente Medellín		
1971–1972	Atlético Nacional		
1972–1974	Independiente Medellín		
1975	Atlético Nacional		
1976–1977	Millonarios		
1978	Unión Magdalena		
1979–1981	Deportes Quindío		

International career
1968–1969	Colombia	7	(1)
- * Club domestic league appearances and goals

Javier Tamayo (born 16 March 1950) is a Colombian footballer. He competed in the men's tournament at the 1968 Summer Olympics.
