= Ender Konca =

Turkish footballer and manager

Personal information
- Full name: Ender Konca
- Date of birth: 22 October 1947 (age 79)
- Place of birth: Istanbul, Turkey
- Positions: Midfielder; striker

Senior career*
Years	Team	Apps	(Gls)
1964–1965	Kasımpaşa		
1965–1967	İstanbulspor		
1967–1971	Eskişehirspor	111	(28)
1971–1973	Eintracht Frankfurt	36	(7)
1973–1977	Fenerbahçe	90	(7)
1977–1981	Eskişehirspor	108	(10)

International career
1968–1977	Turkey	14	(3)

Managerial career
- 1986: Eskişehirspor
- 1990: Eskişehirspor
- * Club domestic league appearances and goals

Ender Konca (born 22 October 1947) is a former footballer who played for Kasımpaşa, İstanbulspor, Eskişehirspor, Eintracht Frankfurt, Fenerbahçe and Turkey.
