= Luis Soto (footballer) =

Colombian footballer (born 1945)

Personal information
- Full name: Luis Eduardo Soto Trejos
- Date of birth: 24 April 1945 (age 81)
- Place of birth: Buga, Valle del Cauca, Colombia
- Position: Defender

International career
| Years | Team | Apps | (Gls) |
- Colombia

Luis Eduardo Soto Trejos (born 24 April 1945) is a Colombian footballer. He competed in the men's tournament at the 1968 Summer Olympics.
