= Miguel Pérez (footballer, born 1945) =

Ecuadorian footballer

Personal information
- Full name: Miguel Oswaldo Pérez Borja
- Date of birth: 8 March 1945 (age 81)
- Place of birth: Quito, Ecuador
- Position: Defender

Senior career*
Years	Team	Apps	(Gls)
- S.D. Aucas
- Barcelona S.C.
- El Nacional

International career
1975–1979	Ecuador	5	(0)
- * Club domestic league appearances and goals

Miguel Oswaldo Pérez Borja (born 8 March 1945) is an Ecuadorian footballer who played as a defender. He made five appearances for the Ecuador national team from 1975 to 1979. He was also part of Ecuador's squad for the 1975 Copa América tournament.
