= N'Dongo Camara =

Guinean footballer

Personal information
- Full name: Mamadouba Yamador Camara
- Date of birth: 1945 (age 80–81)
- Place of birth: Kissidougou, Guinea
- Position: Forward

International career
Years	Team	Apps	(Gls)
1962-1972	Guinea	22	(8)

Mamadouba Yamador "N'Dongo" Camara (born 1945) is a Guinean former footballer. He competed in the men's tournament at the 1968 Summer Olympics.
