= Gabriel Hernández (footballer) =

Colombian footballer (born 1944)

Personal information
- Full name: Gabriel Hernández Alonso
- Date of birth: 1944 (age 81–82)
- Place of birth: Soacha, Colombia

International career
| Years | Team | Apps | (Gls) |
- Colombia

Gabriel Hernández Alonso (born 1944) is a Colombian footballer. He competed in the men's tournament at the 1968 Summer Olympics.
