= Abdeljabar Machouche =

Tunisian footballer (1945–2025)

Personal information
- Date of birth: 26 February 1945
- Place of birth: Tunis, French protectorate of Tunisia
- Date of death: 9 October 2025 (aged 80)
- Position: Forward

Youth career
- 1960–1962: ES Tunis

Senior career*
Years	Team	Apps	(Gls)
1962–1972	ES Tunis	200	(66)
Total		200	(66)

International career
1967–?	Tunisia		
- * Club domestic league appearances and goals

Abdeljabar Machouche (Arabic: عبدالجبار مشوش; 26 February 1945 – 9 October 2025) was a Tunisian footballer who played as a forward.

Machouche spent the entirety of his career with ES Tunis, playing professionally from 1962 to 1972. With ES Tunis, he won the Tunisian Cup in 1964 and the Tunisian National Championship in 1970. He also suited up for the Tunisia national team.

Machouche died on 9 October 2025, at the age of 80.
