= Germán González (footballer, born 1947) =

Colombian footballer (born 1947)

Personal information
- Full name: Germán González Blanco
- Date of birth: 14 June 1947 (age 79)
- Place of birth: Cúcuta, Colombia
- Height: 1.73 m (5 ft 8 in)
- Position: Midfielder

International career
Years	Team	Apps	(Gls)
- Colombia

Germán González Blanco (born 14 June 1947) is a Colombian footballer. He competed in the men's tournament at the 1968 Summer Olympics.
