= Pierre Bangoura =

Guinean footballer

Personal information
- Date of birth: 1938
- Place of birth: Conakry, Guinea
- Date of death: 7 August 2016 (aged 77–78)
- Place of death: Conakry, Guinea

International career
Years	Team	Apps	(Gls)
- Guinea

Pierre Bangoura (1938 – 7 August 2016) was a Guinean footballer. He competed in the men's tournament at the 1968 Summer Olympics.
