= José Dutra =

Brazilian footballer and manager

Personal information
- Full name: José Dutra dos Santos
- Date of birth: 26 January 1948 (age 78)
- Place of birth: Rio de Janeiro, Brazil
- Position: Defender

Senior career*
Years	Team	Apps	(Gls)
1968–1971	Vasco da Gama		
1972	Remo		
1973–1974	Vitória		
1975–1980	Remo		

Managerial career
- 1994–1997: Étoile Sportive du Sahel
- 1998: Al-Nassr FC
- 2009: Al-Hilal Omdurman
- 2009: Al-Ahly Benghazi
- 2010: Wydad Athletic Club
- 2011: CS Constantine
- * Club domestic league appearances and goals

José Dutra dos Santos (born 26 January 1948), sometimes known as just Dutra, is a Brazilian former football player and manager.

== Career ==
Dutra was born in Rio de Janeiro, Rio de Janeiro state. He played at Bonsucesso, Vasco, Vitória and Remo, and participated of the 1968 Olympic Games in Mexico City.

Among the clubs he managed, are Sampaio Corrêa, Moto Club, Maranhão, Rio Negro, Paysandu, Tuna Luso, Remo, Anapolina, Ferroviário the Tunisia national team and Moroccan club Wydad Athletic Club. On 26 September 2011, he resigned from his position with Wydad. In 2009 he managed in Sudan and Libya. He last managed CS Constantine in the Algerian Ligue Professionnelle 1, before resigning his position for health reasons.
