= Norman Ortíz =

Colombian footballer (born 1947)

Personal information
- Full name: Norman Emilio Ortíz
- Date of birth: 3 January 1947 (age 79)
- Place of birth: Cali, Colombia
- Height: 1.84 m (6 ft 0 in)
- Position: Forward

International career
Years	Team	Apps	(Gls)
- Colombia

Norman Ortíz (born 3 January 1947) is a Colombian footballer. He competed in the men's tournament at the 1968 Summer Olympics.
