= Clemente Iriarte =

Spanish footballer (1946–2021)

Personal information
- Full name: Clemente Iriarte Madariaga
- Date of birth: 25 July 1946
- Place of birth: Pamplona, Spain
- Date of death: 29 December 2021 (aged 75)
- Place of death: Pamplona, Spain
- Height: 1.82 m (6 ft 0 in)
- Position: Midfielder

Youth career
- Unión Española

Senior career*
Years	Team	Apps	(Gls)
1964–1966	Unión Española	54	(26)
1966–1967	Rayo Vallecano	24	(1)
1968–1969	Burgos	38	(7)
1969–1978	Real Oviedo	319	(23)
1978–1983	Osasuna	149	(11)
Total		584	(68)
- * Club domestic league appearances and goals

Clemente Iriarte Madariaga (25 July 1946 – 29 December 2021) was a Spanish professional footballer who played as a midfielder.

== Career ==
A product of Chilean side Unión Española, Iriarte played for them between 1964 and 1966 in the top division.

Then, he returned to his country of birth and played for Rayo Vallecano, Burgos, Real Oviedo and Osasuna.

== Personal life and death ==
Iriarte was born in Pamplona on 25 July 1946. He emigrated to Chile along with his family at the age of five and returned to Spain in 1966. He died in Pamplona on 29 December 2021, at the age of 75.

He was nicknamed El Pulpo (The Octopus).
