= Michel Delafosse =

French footballer (1943–2013)

Personal information
- Date of birth: 25 November 1943
- Place of birth: Rouen, France
- Date of death: 9 July 2013 (aged 69)

International career
Years	Team	Apps	(Gls)
- France

Michel Delafosse (25 November 1943 – 9 July 2013) was a French footballer. He competed in the men's tournament at the 1968 Summer Olympics.
