= Manoel Maria =

Brazilian footballer

Personal information
- Full name: Manoel Maria Evangelista Barbosa dos Santos
- Date of birth: 29 February 1948 (age 78)
- Place of birth: Belém, Brazil
- Position: Winger

Youth career
- 1963–1965: União Esportiva
- 1965: Remo

Senior career*
Years	Team	Apps	(Gls)
1966	São Raimundo-PA		
1967–1968	Tuna Luso		
1968–1973	Santos		
1973	Portuguesa Santista		
1973	Racing Club	5	(0)
1974	Paysandu		
1974	Colorado		
1975	New York Cosmos		
1976	Santos		
1977	Noroeste		
1977	Corinthians de Presidente Prudente		

International career
1968	Brazil Olympic		

Managerial career
- 1997: Santos (women)
- * Club domestic league appearances and goals

Manoel Maria Evangelista Barbosa dos Santos (born 29 February 1948), known as Manoel Maria, is a Brazilian retired footballer and football manager. He played mainly as a right winger, and competed in the men's tournament at the 1968 Summer Olympics.

His son, Aarão Alves, is also a manager.

== Honours ==
Santos

- Campeonato Paulista: 1968, 1969, 1973
- Torneio Roberto Gomes Pedrosa: 1968
- Recopa Sudamericana: 1968
- Intercontinental Supercup: 1968
