= Jean Lempereur =

French footballer (born 1938)

Personal information
- Date of birth: 28 December 1938
- Place of birth: Maubeuge, France
- Date of death: 21 May 2025 (aged 86)

International career
Years	Team	Apps	(Gls)
- France

Jean Lempereur (28 December 1938 – 21 May 2025) was a French footballer. He competed in the men's tournament at the 1968 Summer Olympics.
