= China (footballer, born 1948) =

Brazilian footballer (1948–2018)

Personal information
- Full name: Ademir Ueta
- Date of birth: 3 October 1948
- Place of birth: São Paulo, Brazil
- Date of death: 13 October 2018 (aged 70)
- Place of death: Catanduva, Brazil
- Position: Midfielder

International career
Years	Team	Apps	(Gls)
- Brazil Olympic

Ademir Ueta, more commonly known by his nickname China, (3 October 1948 – 13 October 2018) was a Brazilian professional footballer. He competed in the men's tournament at the 1968 Summer Olympics. China played for various clubs including Palmeiras, Clube Náutico Capibaribe. Guarani and Marítimo, where he scored 21 goals in 63 games.

He died on 13 October 2018, at the age of 70.
