= Freddy Zix =

French footballer (1935–2025)

Personal information
- Date of birth: 7 January 1935
- Place of birth: Strasbourg, France
- Date of death: 5 January 2025 (aged 89)
- Place of death: Strasbourg, France
- Position: Defender

Senior career*
| Years | Team | Apps | (Gls) |
- ASL Robertsau
| 1955–1956 | Strasbourg | | |
- Mulhouse
- AS Mutzig
- CS Pierrots Strasbourg

International career
- France
- * Club domestic league appearances and goals

Freddy Zix (7 January 1935 – 5 January 2025) was a French footballer. He competed in the men's tournament at the 1968 Summer Olympics. A defender, he began his playing career with ASL Robertsau, then spent one season with Strasbourg followed by a 13-year career at amateur level with Mulhouse, AS Mutzig and CS Pierrots Strasbourg. With Pierrots Strasbourg, he won the 1968–69 Championnat de France amateur. He was director of RC Strasbourg's training centre from 1984 to 2005.

Zix died in Strasbourg on 5 January 2025, at the age of 89.

== Honours ==
CS Pierrots Strasbourg

- Championnat de France amateur: 1968–69
