= Henri Ribul =

French footballer (born 1941)

Personal information
- Date of birth: 1 March 1941 (age 85)
- Place of birth: Toulouse, France

International career
Years	Team	Apps	(Gls)
- France

Henri Ribul (born 1 March 1941) is a French footballer. He competed in the men's tournament at the 1968 Summer Olympics.
