= Gérard Hallet =

French footballer (born 1946)

Personal information
- Date of birth: 4 March 1946 (age 80)
- Place of birth: Sézanne, France
- Height: 1.80 m (5 ft 11 in)
- Position: Midfielder

Senior career*
Years	Team	Apps	(Gls)
1965–1971	Montluçon		
1971–1972	Paris SG	33	(8)
1972	Paris FC		
1972–1980	Auxerre	112	(17)

International career
- France Amateur
- * Club domestic league appearances and goals

Gérard Hallet (born 4 March 1946) is a retired French footballer. He played for Montluçon, Paris SG, Paris FC and Auxerre. Hallet played for and captained the France national amateur football team, scoring a goal for them in an Olympic qualification match against Iceland in June 1971.

Hallet was among the Auxerre squad which finished as runners up in the 1979 Coupe de France final, for which the squad was honoured by the city of Auxerre 40 years after.
