= Oscar Muñoz (footballer) =

Colombian footballer (born 1949)

Personal information
- Full name: Oscar Humberto Muñoz Monsalve
- Date of birth: 20 May 1949 (age 77)
- Place of birth: Medellín, Colombia
- Height: 1.70 m (5 ft 7 in)
- Position: Defender

International career
Years	Team	Apps	(Gls)
- Colombia

Oscar Muñoz (born 20 May 1949) is a Colombian footballer. He competed in the men's tournament at the 1968 Summer Olympics.
