= Michel Verhoeve =

French footballer (1939–2019)

Personal information
- Date of birth: 29 January 1939
- Place of birth: Lambersart, France
- Date of death: 3 December 2019 (aged 80)
- Position: Defender

International career
Years	Team	Apps	(Gls)
- France

Michel Verhoeve (29 January 1939 – 4 December 2019) was a French footballer. He competed in the men's tournament at the 1968 Summer Olympics.
