= Gilbert Planté =

French footballer (1941-2010)

Personal information
- Date of birth: 15 March 1941
- Place of birth: Marseille, France
- Date of death: 20 October 2010 (aged 69)

International career
Years	Team	Apps	(Gls)
- France

Gilbert Planté (15 March 1941 – 20 October 2010) was a French footballer. He competed in the men's tournament at the 1968 Summer Olympics.
