= Dario Grava =

French footballer (born 1948)

Personal information
- Date of birth: February 11, 1948 (age 78)
- Place of birth: Claut, Italy
- Position: Defender

Senior career*
| Years | Team | Apps | (Gls) |
| 1968–1973 | RC Strasbourg | | |
| 1973–1977 | OGC Nice | | |
| 1978–1979 | FCSR Haguenau | | |

International career
| 1973 | France | 1 | (0) |
- * Club domestic league appearances and goals

Dario Grava (born February 11, 1948) is a former professional footballer who played as a defender. Born in Italy, he represented France internationally.
