= Daniel Horlaville =

French footballer (1945–2019)

Personal information
- Date of birth: 22 September 1945
- Place of birth: Oissel, France
- Date of death: 28 April 2019 (aged 73)
- Position: Midfielder

Youth career
- 1953–1963: CA Oissel

Senior career*
Years	Team	Apps	(Gls)
1963–1971	Quevilly		
1971–1972	Paris Saint-Germain	7	(0)
1972–1974	Paris FC		
1974–1978	Rouen		
1978–1985	CA Oissel		

International career
1969	France	1	(0)
- * Club domestic league appearances and goals

Daniel Horlaville (22 September 1945 – 28 April 2019) was a French footballer who played as a midfielder. He was the only post-World War II amateur player to be capped for France.

== Personal life ==
Horlaville was the father of former professional footballer Christophe Horlaville. He died on 28 April 2019.
