= Fabio Mosquera =

Colombian footballer (1947–2026)

Personal information
- Date of birth: 28 November 1947
- Place of birth: Cali, Colombia
- Date of death: 14 September 2026 (aged 78)
- Height: 1.72 m (5 ft 8 in)
- Position: Forward

Senior career*
Years	Team	Apps	(Gls)
- Deportivo Cali

International career
- Colombia
- * Club domestic league appearances and goals

Fabio Mosquera (28 November 1947 – 14 September 2026) was a Colombian footballer who played as a forward for Deportivo Cali. He competed in the men's tournament at the 1968 Summer Olympics. Mosquera died on 14 September 2026, at the age of 78.
