= Jean-Louis Hodoul =

French footballer (born 1946)

Personal information
- Date of birth: 1 April 1946 (age 80)
- Place of birth: Marseille, France
- Height: 1.73 m (5 ft 8 in)
- Position: Defender

Youth career
- 1957–1964: Marseille

Senior career*
Years	Team	Apps	(Gls)
1964–1972	Marseille	177	(3)
1972–1973	Bastia	32	(0)
1973–1977	Troyes	74	(0)
Total		283	(3)
- * Club domestic league appearances and goals

Jean-Louis Hodoul (born 1 April 1946) is a French former professional footballer. He played as a defender for Marseille, SC Bastia and Troyes AC.

Hodoul played for France at the 1968 Summer Olympics.
