= Alfonso Jaramillo =

Colombian footballer (born 1947)

Personal information
- Full name: Alfonso Jaramillo Puerto
- Date of birth: 20 July 1947 (age 79)
- Place of birth: Bogotá, Colombia
- Height: 1.68 m (5 ft 6 in)
- Position: Forward

International career
Years	Team	Apps	(Gls)
- Colombia

Alfonso Jaramillo (born 20 July 1947) is a Colombian footballer. He competed in the men's tournament at the 1968 Summer Olympics.
