= Joaquín Pardo =

Colombian footballer (1946–2020)

Personal information
- Date of birth: 28 February 1946
- Place of birth: Barranquilla, Colombia
- Date of death: 16 October 2020 (aged 74)
- Height: 1.77 m (5 ft 10 in)
- Position: Midfielder

International career
Years	Team	Apps	(Gls)
- Colombia

Joaquín Pardo (28 February 1946 – 16 October 2020) was a Colombian footballer. He competed in the men's tournament at the 1968 Summer Olympics.
