= Gustavo Santa =

Colombian footballer (born 1945)

Personal information
- Full name: Gustavo Santa Pulgarín
- Date of birth: 8 October 1945 (age 81)
- Place of birth: Pereira, Colombia
- Height: 1.68 m (5 ft 6 in)
- Position: Forward

International career
Years	Team	Apps	(Gls)
- Colombia

Gustavo Santa (born 8 October 1945) is a Colombian footballer. He competed in the men's tournament at the 1968 Summer Olympics.
