= Marc-Kanyan Case =

French footballer (1942–2023)

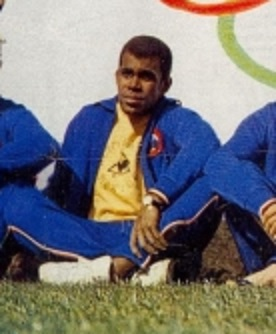
- Case in 1968

Personal information
- Date of birth: 14 September 1942
- Place of birth: Lifou, New Caledonia, France
- Date of death: 6 January 2023 (aged 80)
- Height: 1.72 m (5 ft 8 in)
- Position: Forward

Youth career
- 1953–1955: Sainte-Marie Nouméa
- 1955–1958: Olympique Nouméa

Senior career*
Years	Team	Apps	(Gls)
1958–1963	Olympique Nouméa		
1963–1969	Gazélec Ajaccio	28	(15)
1969–1973	Bastia	159	(53)
1973–1975	Nîmes	57	(19)
1975–1977	Gazélec Ajaccio	48	(14)
Total		292	(101)

International career
1963	New Caledonia	2	(6)
1968	France Olympic	4	(2)
- * Club domestic league appearances and goals

Marc-Kanyan Case (14 September 1942 – 6 January 2023) was a French professional footballer. He competed in the men's tournament at the 1968 Summer Olympics.
