= Football at the 1968 Summer Olympics – Group C =

Football at the Summer Olympics group

Group C of the 1968 Summer Olympics football tournament took place from 14 to 18 October 1968. The group consisted of El Salvador, Ghana, Hungary, Israel. The top two teams, Spain and Japan, advanced to the quarter-finals.

== Teams ==
Team	Region	Method of qualification	Date of qualification	Finals appearance	Last appearance	Previous best performance							
Team	Region	Method of qualification	Date of qualification	Finals appearance	Last appearance	Previous best performance	Hungary	Europe	Holders	23 October 1964	7th	1964	Gold medal (1952, 1964)
Israel	Asia	Asia Group 3 winners	22 March 1968	1st	—	—							
El Salvador	North America	CONCACAF final round winner	26 May 1968	1st	—	—							
Ghana (Note: Morocco initially qualified as Africa Group 3 winners, but withdrew due to refusing to play against Israel in the final tournament, and were replaced by Ghana.)	Africa	Replacement by Morocco	30 August 1968	2nd	1964	Quarter-finals (1964)							

== Standings ==
Pos	Team	Pld	W	D	L	GF	GA	GD	Pts	Qualification
1	Hungary	3	2	1	0	8	2	+6	5	Advance to knockout stage
2	Israel	3	2	0	1	8	6	+2	4	Advance to knockout stage
3	Ghana	3	0	2	1	6	8	−2	2	
4	El Salvador	3	0	1	2	2	8	−6	1	

Source: FIFA

In the quarter-finals:

- The winners of Group C, Hungary, advanced to play the runners-up of Group D, Guatemala.
- The runners-up of Group C, Israel, advanced to play the winners of Group D, Bulgaria.

== Matches ==
=== Hungary vs El Salvador ===
14 October 1968
12:00

Hungary	4–0	El Salvador
Menczel 19'; Dunai 47'; Fazekas 51'; Sárközi 68'	Report

Estadio Jalisco, Guadalajara
Referee: Diego Di Leo (Mexico)

1	Károly Fatér
2	Dezső Novák
4	Miklós Páncsics
5	Iván Menczel
6	Lajos Szűcs
7	László Fazekas	(substituted off) 54'
10	Antal Dunai
11	László Nagy
14	Ernő Noskó
15	István Juhász
17	István Sárközi	(substituted off) 70'
Substitutions:
19	Zoltán Szarka
9	Lajos Kocsis	(substituted on) 54'
12	László Keglovich
16	Miklós Szalay
18	István Básti	(substituted on) 70'
Manager:
(Hungary) Károly Lakat

1	Ricardo Martínez	(substituted off) 55'
2	Roberto Rivas
4	Edgar Morales
5	Jorge Vásquez
7	Salvador Flamenco	(substituted off) 72'
8	Alberto Villalta
9	José Quintanilla
10	Pipo Rodríguez
11	Elmer Acevedo
13	Mauricio González
16	Sergio Méndez
Substitutions:
19	Gualberto Fernández	(substituted on) 55'
12	Mario Flores
14	Juan Ramón Martínez	(substituted on) 72'
15	Víctor Azúcar
17	José Manuel Angel
Manager:
(El Salvador) Rigoberto Guzmán

Assistant referees:
Fernando Buergo (Mexico)
Javier Galindo (Mexico)

=== Israel vs Ghana ===
14 October 1968
12:00

Israel	5–3	Ghana
Spiegel 11', 75'; Faigenbaum 16', 30', 70'	Report	Jabir 18', 79'; Gbadamosi 35'

Estadio León, León
Referee: Michel Kitabdjian (France)

19	Shmuel Malika-Aharon
2	Shraga Bar
3	Menachem Bello
4	Zvi Rosen	Booked
5	Yisha'ayahu Schwager
6	Shmuel Rosenthal
7	Rachamim Talbi	Booked
8	Giora Spiegel
9	Yehoshua Feigenbaum
10	Mordechai Spiegler
13	George Borba
Substitutions:
1	Haim Levin
11	Roby Young
12	Itzhak Drucker
15	Itzhak Shum
16	David Karako
Manager:
(Israel) Emmanuel Scheffer

13	Jon Bortey Noawy	Booked
4	John Eshun
5	Charles Addo Odametey
6	Ibrahim Sunday	(substituted off) 45'
8	Cecil Jones Attuquayefio	(red card) 60'
9	George Alhassan	(red card) 89'
10	Amosa Gbadamosi
15	Malik Jabir
16	Oliver Acquah
17	Jonathan Kpakpo	Booked
18	Robert Foley
Substitutions:
1	Robert Mensah
2	Akuamoah Boateng
3	Bernard Kusi
12	Abukari Gariba	(substituted on) 45'
14	Joseph Wilson
Manager:
(West Germany) Karl-Heinz Marotzke

Assistant referees:
Mariano Medina Iglesias (Spain)
Guillermo Velásquez (Colombia)

=== Hungary vs Ghana ===
16 October 1968
15:30

Hungary	2–2	Ghana
Dunai 15'; Menczel 17'	Report	Sunday 12'; Sampene 33'

Estadio Jalisco, Guadalajara
Referee: Yoshiyuki Maruyama (Japan)

1	Károly Fatér
4	Miklós Páncsics
5	Iván Menczel
6	Lajos Szűcs
7	László Fazekas	(substituted off) 69'
10	Antal Dunai
11	László Nagy
12	László Keglovich
14	Ernő Noskó
15	István Juhász
17	István Sárközi	(substituted off) 45'
Substitutions:
19	Zoltán Szarka
3	Lajos Dunai
9	Lajos Kocsis	(substituted on) 45'
16	Miklós Szalay
18	István Básti	(substituted on) 69'
Manager:
(Hungary) Károly Lakat

13	Jon Bortey Noawy	Booked
4	John Eshun
6	Ibrahim Sunday
7	Osei Kofi
10	Amosa Gbadamosi
11	Sammy Sampene
14	Joseph Wilson
15	Malik Jabir
16	Oliver Acquah
17	Jonathan Kpakpo	Booked
18	Robert Foley
Substitutions:
1	Robert Mensah
3	Bernard Kusi
19	John Botchway
Manager:
(West Germany) Karl-Heinz Marotzke

Assistant referees:
Arturo Yamasaki (Peru)
Javier Galindo (Mexico)

=== Israel vs El Salvador ===
16 October 1968
15:30

Israel	3–1	El Salvador
Talbi 20'; Spiegler 44'; Bar 85'	Report	Martínez 35'

Estadio León, León
Referee: Shakibudeen Thompson (Nigeria)

1	Haim Levin
3	Menachem Bello
4	Zvi Rosen
5	Yisha'ayahu Schwager	(substituted off) 67'
6	Shmuel Rosenthal
7	Rachamim Talbi
8	Giora Spiegel
9	Yehoshua Feigenbaum
10	Mordechai Spiegler
12	Itzhak Drucker	Sent off (straight red)
13	George Borba
Substitutions:
19	Shmuel Malika-Aharon
2	Shraga Bar	(substituted on) 67'
11	Roby Young
15	Itzhak Shum
16	David Karako
Manager:
(Israel) Emmanuel Scheffer

19	Gualberto Fernández
2	Roberto Rivas
3	Guillermo Castro
5	Jorge Vásquez
6	José Ruano
8	Alberto Villalta	(red card) 67'
9	José Quintanilla
10	Pipo Rodríguez		(substituted off) 75'
12	Mario Flores		(substituted off) 32'
13	Mauricio González
16	Sergio Méndez
Substitutions:
7	Salvador Flamenco
14	Juan Ramón Martínez		(substituted on) 32'
15	Víctor Azúcar		(substituted on) 75'
17	José Manuel Angel
18	Joaquin Alabi
Manager:
(El Salvador) Rigoberto Guzmán

Assistant referees:
Mariano Medina Iglesias (Spain)
Guillermo Velásquez (Colombia)

=== Hungary vs Israel ===
18 October 1968
15:30

Hungary	2–0	Israel
Dunai 40', 75'	Report

Estadio Jalisco, Guadalajara
Referee: Arturo Yamasaki (Peru)

1	Károly Fatér
2	Dezső Novák
3	Lajos Dunai
4	Miklós Páncsics
5	Iván Menczel
6	Lajos Szűcs
7	László Fazekas
10	Antal Dunai
14	Ernő Noskó
15	István Juhász	(substituted off) 45'
18	István Básti
Substitutions:
19	Zoltán Szarka
9	Lajos Kocsis
11	László Nagy
16	Miklós Szalay	(substituted on) 45'
17	István Sárközi
Manager:
(Hungary) Károly Lakat

1	Haim Levin
2	Shraga Bar
3	Menachem Bello
4	Zvi Rosen	Booked
7	Rachamim Talbi	(red card) 58'
8	Giora Spiegel
9	Yehoshua Feigenbaum
10	Mordechai Spiegler
12	Itzhak Drucker
13	George Borba		(substituted off) 45'
16	David Karako		(substituted off) 70'
Substitutions:
19	Shmuel Malika-Aharon
6	Shmuel Rosenthal
11	Roby Young		(substituted on) 45'
14	Yitzhak Englander
17	Nachman Castro		(substituted on) 70'
Manager:
(Israel) Emmanuel Scheffer

Assistant referees:
Romualdo Arppi Filho (Brazil)
Alfonso González Archundía (Mexico)

=== El Salvador vs Ghana ===
18 October 1968
15:30

El Salvador	1–1	Ghana
Rodríguez 42'	Report	Kofi 55'

Estadio León, León
Referee: Mariano Medina Iglesias (Spain)

19	Gualberto Fernández
2	Roberto Rivas
3	Guillermo Castro
5	Jorge Vásquez
6	José Ruano	(substituted off) 65'
7	Salvador Flamenco
9	José Quintanilla
10	Pipo Rodríguez
13	Mauricio González
14	Juan Ramón Martínez	(substituted off) 75'
16	Sergio Méndez
Substitutions:
4	Edgar Morales
12	Mario Flores
15	Víctor Azúcar	(substituted on) 75'
17	José Manuel Angel	(substituted on) 65'
18	Joaquin Alabi
Manager:
(El Salvador) Rigoberto Guzmán

13	Jon Bortey Noawy	Booked
4	John Eshun
6	Ibrahim Sunday
7	Osei Kofi
10	Amosa Gbadamosi
11	Sammy Sampene	(substituted off) 45'
14	Joseph Wilson
15	Malik Jabir
16	Oliver Acquah
17	Jonathan Kpakpo
18	Robert Foley
Substitutions:
1	Robert Mensah
3	Bernard Kusi	(substituted on) 45'
19	John Botchway
Manager:
(West Germany) Karl-Heinz Marotzke

Assistant referees:
Jean-Louis Faber (Guinea)
Shakibudeen Thompson (Nigeria)

== See also ==
- Hungary at the Olympics
- Israel at the Olympics
- Ghana at the Olympics
- El Salvador at the Olympics
