= Football at the 1968 Summer Olympics – final =

Men's Football Summer Olympics final, held in Mexico

Summer Olympics – Men's Football Final
- Event: Football at the 1968 Summer Olympics
Bulgaria	Hungary
1	4
- Date: 26 October 1968
- Venue: Estadio Azteca, Mexico City
- Referee: Diego Di Leo (Mexico)
- Attendance: 75,000

The 1968 Summer Olympics football tournament gold medal match was the final match of the 1964 Summer Olympics football tournament, the 15th edition of Olympic competition for men's national football teams. The match was played at Estadio Azteca in Mexico City, Mexico, on 26 October 1968, and was contested by Bulgaria and Hungary.

== Description ==
The tournament comprised hosts Mexico, holders Hungary and twelve other teams who emerged victorious from the qualification phase, The 16 teams competed in a group stage in the first round, from which eight teams qualified for the knockout stage. En route to the final, Bulgaria finished first in Group D with two wins (7–0 against Thailand, 2–1 against Guatemala) and one draw (2–2 against Czechoslovakia). They then beat Israel 1–1 after drawing of lots in the quarter-finals and hosts Mexico 3–2 in the semi-finals.

Hungary finished first in Group C with two wins, (4–0 against El Salvador, 2–0 against Israel) and one draw (2–2 against Ghana, defeating Guatemala 1–0 in the quarter-finals and Japan 5–0 in the semi-finals. The final took place in front of 75,000 spectators and was refereed by Diego Di Leo.

Bulgaria opened the scoring in the 20th minute through Tsvetan Veselinov until Hungary scored two goals by Iván Menczel and Antal Dunai in quick succession to take the lead towards the end of the first half. Straight afterwards, three Bulgaria players were sent off; Tsevtan Veselinov, Kiril Ivkov, and Atanas Mihaylov. The second half saw Hungary score another goal by Antal Dunai just four minutes in and was further topped with a fourth goal by István Juhász and towards the final minutes of the match he was sent off in the 85th minute. Hungary won the match 4–1 and the 1968 Olympic football tournament.

== Route to the final ==
Bulgaria
	Opponent	Result
1	Thailand	7–0
2	Czechoslovakia	2–2
3	Guatemala	2–1
QF	Israel	1–1
SF	Mexico	3–2

Hungary
	Opponent	Result
1	El Salvador	4–0
2	Ghana	2–2
3	Israel	2–0
QF	Guatemala	1–0
SF	Japan	5–0

== Match ==
=== Details ===
26 October 1968
12:00

Bulgaria	1–4	Hungary
Veselinov 22'	Report	Menczel 40' A. Dunai 41', 49' Juhász 62'

Azteca Stadium, Mexico City
Attendance: 75,000
Referee: Diego Di Leo (Mexico)

Bulgaria	Hungary

1	Stoyan Yordanov
2	Atanas Gerov
3	Georgi Hristakiev
4	Milko Gaydarski
5	Kiril Ivkov	(red card) 44'
6	Ivaylo Georgiev
7	Tsvetan Veselinov	(red card) 43'
8	Evgeni Yanchovski		(substituted off) 54'
9	Petar Zhekov	Yellow card
10	Atanas Mihaylov	(red card) 44'
13	Asparuh Nikodimov		(substituted off) 62'
Substitutions:
19	Todor Krastev
12	Kiril Stankov		(substituted on) 54'
14	Mihail Gyonin
15	Yancho Dimitrov
16	Georgi Tsvetkov		(substituted on) 62'
Manager:
(Bulgaria) Georgi Berkov

1	Károly Fatér
2	Dezső Novák
3	Lajos Dunai
4	Miklós Páncsics
5	Iván Menczel
6	Lajos Szűcs
7	László Fazekas
10	Antal Dunai
11	László Nagy
14	Ernő Noskó
15	István Juhász	(red card) 85'
Substitutions:
19	Zoltán Szarka
9	Lajos Kocsis
12	László Keglovich
16	Miklós Szalay
17	István Sárközi
Manager:
(Hungary) Károly Lakat

Assistant referees:
Arturo Yamasaki (Peru)
Alfonso González (Mexico)

== See also ==
- Bulgaria at the Olympics
- Hungary at the Olympics
