= List of Hungarian Olympic champions =

Number	Name(s)	Games	Sport	Event
1.	Alfréd Hajós	(Kingdom of Greece) 1896 Athens	Swimming	Men's 100 m freestyle
2.	Alfréd Hajós	(Kingdom of Greece) 1896 Athens	Swimming	Men's 1200 m freestyle
3.	Rudolf Bauer	(France) 1900 Paris	Athletics	Men's Discus throw
4.	Zoltán Halmay	(United States) 1904 St. Louis	Swimming	Men's 50 yd freestyle
5.	Zoltán Halmay	(United States) 1904 St. Louis	Swimming	Men's 100 yd freestyle
6.	Jenő Fuchs	(United Kingdom) 1908 London	Fencing	Men's Sabre individual
7.	Jenő Fuchs; Oszkár Gerde; Péter Tóth; Lajos Werkner	(United Kingdom) 1908 London	Fencing	Men's Sabre team
8.	Richárd Weisz	(United Kingdom) 1908 London	Wrestling	Men's Greco-Roman Super heavyweight
9.	Jenő Fuchs	(Sweden) 1912 Stockholm	Fencing	Men's Sabre individual
10.	László Berti; Dezső Földes; Jenő Fuchs; Oszkár Gerde; Ervin Mészáros; Zoltán Ozoray Schenker; Péter Tóth; Lajos Werkner	(Sweden) 1912 Stockholm	Fencing	Men's Sabre team
11.	Sándor Prokopp	(Sweden) 1912 Stockholm	Shooting	Men's 300 m military rifle, three positions
12.	Sándor Pósta	(France) 1924 Paris	Fencing	Men's Sabre individual
13.	Gyula Halasy	(France) 1924 Paris	Shooting	Men's trap
14.	Antal Kocsis	(Netherlands) 1928 Amsterdam	Boxing	Men's Flyweight
15.	Ödön Tersztyánszky	(Netherlands) 1928 Amsterdam	Fencing	Men's Sabre individual
16.	János Garay; Gyula Glykais; Sándor Gombos; Attila Petschauer; József Rády; Ödön Tersztyánszky	(Netherlands) 1928 Amsterdam	Fencing	Men's Sabre team
17.	Lajos Keresztes	(Netherlands) 1928 Amsterdam	Wrestling	Men's Greco-Roman lightweight
18.	István Énekes	(United States) 1932 Los Angeles	Boxing	Men's Flyweight
19.	György Piller-Jekelfalussy	(United States) 1932 Los Angeles	Fencing	Men's Sabre individual
20.	Aladár Gerevich; Gyula Glykais; Endre Kabos; Ernő Nagy; Attila Petschauer; György Piller-Jekelfalussy	(United States) 1932 Los Angeles	Fencing	Men's Sabre team
21.	István Pelle	(United States) 1932 Los Angeles	Gymnastics	Men's Floor exercises
22.	István Pelle	(United States) 1932 Los Angeles	Gymnastics	Men's Pommel horse
23.	Men's water polo team: István Barta György Bródy Olivér Halassy Márton Homonnai Sándor Ivády Alajos Keserű Ferenc Keserű János Németh Miklós Sárkány József Vértesy	(United States) 1932 Los Angeles	Water polo	Men's tournament
24.	Ibolya Csák	(Germany) 1936 Berlin	Athletics	Women's High jump
25.	Imre Harangi	(Germany) 1936 Berlin	Boxing	Men's Lightweight
26.	Endre Kabos	(Germany) 1936 Berlin	Fencing	Men's Sabre individual
27.	Tibor Berczelly; Aladár Gerevich; Endre Kabos; Pál Kovács; László Rajcsányi; Imre Rajczy	(Germany) 1936 Berlin	Fencing	Men's Sabre team
28.	Ilona Elek-Schacherer	(Germany) 1936 Berlin	Fencing	Women's Foil individual
29.	Ferenc Csik	(Germany) 1936 Berlin	Swimming	Men's 100 m freestyle
30.	Men's water polo team: Mihály Bozsi Jenő Brandi György Bródy Olivér Halassy Kálmán Hazai Márton Homonnai György Kutasi István Molnár János Németh Miklós Sárkány Sándor Tarics	(Germany) 1936 Berlin	Water polo	Men's tournament
31.	Márton Lőrincz	(Germany) 1936 Berlin	Wrestling	Men's Greco-Roman bantamweight
32.	Ödön Zombori	(Germany) 1936 Berlin	Wrestling	Men's Freestyle bantamweight
33.	Károly Kárpáti	(Germany) 1936 Berlin	Wrestling	Men's Freestyle lightweight
34.	Imre Németh	(United Kingdom) 1948 London	Athletics	Men's Hammer throw
35.	Olga Gyarmati	(United Kingdom) 1948 London	Athletics	Women's Long jump
36.	Tibor Csik	(United Kingdom) 1948 London	Boxing	Men's Bantamweight
37.	László Papp	(United Kingdom) 1948 London	Boxing	Men's Middleweight
38.	Aladár Gerevich	(United Kingdom) 1948 London	Fencing	Men's Sabre individual
39.	Tibor Berczelly; Aladár Gerevich; Rudolf Kárpáti; Pál Kovács; Bertalan Papp; László Rajcsányi	(United Kingdom) 1948 London	Fencing	Men's Sabre team
40.	Ilona Elek	(United Kingdom) 1948 London	Fencing	Women's Foil individual
41.	Ferenc Pataki	(United Kingdom) 1948 London	Gymnastics	Men's Floor exercises
42.	Károly Takács	(United Kingdom) 1948 London	Shooting	Men's 25 m rapid fire pistol
43.	Gyula Bóbis	(United Kingdom) 1948 London	Wrestling	Men's Freestyle Heavyweight
44.	József Csermák	(Finland) 1952 Helsinki	Athletics	Men's Hammer throw
45.	László Papp	(Finland) 1952 Helsinki	Boxing	Men's Light middleweight
46.	Pál Kovács	(Finland) 1952 Helsinki	Fencing	Men's Sabre individual
47.	Tibor Berczelly; Aladár Gerevich; Rudolf Kárpáti; Pál Kovács; Bertalan Papp; László Rajcsányi	(Finland) 1952 Helsinki	Fencing	Men's Sabre team
48.	Men's football team: József Bozsik László Budai II. Jenő Buzánszky Zoltán Czibor Lajos Csordás Jenő Dalnoki Gyula Grosics Nándor Hidegkuti Sándor Kocsis Imre Kovács I. Mihály Lantos Gyula Lóránt Péter Palotás Ferenc Puskás József Zakariás	(Finland) 1952 Helsinki	Football	Men's tournament
49.	Ágnes Keleti	(Finland) 1952 Helsinki	Gymnastics	Women's Floor exercises
50.	Margit Korondi	(Finland) 1952 Helsinki	Gymnastics	Women's Uneven bars
51.	Gábor Benedek; Aladár Kovácsi; István Szondy	(Finland) 1952 Helsinki	Modern pentathlon	Men's Team competition
52.	Károly Takács	(Finland) 1952 Helsinki	Shooting	Men's 25 m rapid fire pistol
53.	Éva Székely	(Finland) 1952 Helsinki	Swimming	Women's 200 m breaststroke
54.	Katalin Szőke	(Finland) 1952 Helsinki	Swimming	Women's 100 m freestyle
55.	Valéria Gyenge	(Finland) 1952 Helsinki	Swimming	Women's 400 m freestyle
56.	Éva Novák; Ilona Novák; Katalin Szőke; Judit Temes	(Finland) 1952 Helsinki	Swimming	Women's 4×100 m freestyle relay
57.	Men's water polo team: Róbert Antal Antal Bolvári Dezső Fábián Dezső Gyarmati István Hasznos László Jeney György Kárpáti Dezső Lemhényi Kálmán Markovits Miklós Martin Károly Szittya István Szivós Sr. György Vízvári	(Finland) 1952 Helsinki	Water polo	Men's tournament
58.	Imre Hódos	(Finland) 1952 Helsinki	Wrestling	Men's Greco-Roman bantamweight
59.	Miklós Szilvásy	(Finland) 1952 Helsinki	Wrestling	Men's Greco-Roman welterweight
60.	László Papp	(Australia) 1956 Melbourne	Boxing	Men's Light middleweight
61.	László Fábián; János Urányi	(Australia) 1956 Melbourne	Canoeing	Men's K-2 10000 m
62.	Rudolf Kárpáti	(Australia) 1956 Melbourne	Fencing	Men's Sabre individual
63.	Aladár Gerevich; Jenő Hámori; Rudolf Kárpáti; Attila Keresztes; Pál Kovács; Dániel Magay	(Australia) 1956 Melbourne	Fencing	Men's Sabre team
64.	Ágnes Keleti	(Australia) 1956 Melbourne	Gymnastics	Women's Balance beam
65.	Ágnes Keleti	(Australia) 1956 Melbourne	Gymnastics	Women's Floor exercises
66.	Andrea Bodó; Ágnes Keleti; Alíz Kertész; Margit Korondi; Erzsébet Köteles; Olga Tass	(Australia) 1956 Melbourne	Gymnastics	Women's Team, portable apparatus
67.	Ágnes Keleti	(Australia) 1956 Melbourne	Gymnastics	Women's Uneven bars
68.	Men's water polo team: Antal Bolvári Ottó Boros Dezső Gyarmati István Hevesi László Jeney Tivadar Kanizsa György Kárpáti Kálmán Markovits Mihály Mayer István Szivós Sr. Ervin Zádor	(Australia) 1956 Melbourne	Water polo	Men's tournament
69.	Gyula Török	(Italy) 1960 Rome	Boxing	Men's Flyweight
70.	János Parti	(Italy) 1960 Rome	Canoeing	Men's C-1 1000 m
71.	Rudolf Kárpáti	(Italy) 1960 Rome	Fencing	Men's Sabre individual
72.	Gábor Delneky; Aladár Gerevich; Zoltán Horváth; Rudolf Kárpáti; Pál Ádám Kovács; Tamás Mendelényi	(Italy) 1960 Rome	Fencing	Men's Sabre team
73.	Ferenc Németh	(Italy) 1960 Rome	Modern pentathlon	Men's Individual competition
74.	András Balczó; Imre Nagy; Ferenc Németh	(Italy) 1960 Rome	Modern pentathlon	Men's Team competition
75.	Tibor Pézsa	(Japan) 1964 Tokyo	Fencing	Men's Sabre individual
76.	Árpád Bárány; Tamás Gábor; István Kausz; Győző Kulcsár; Zoltán Nemere	(Japan) 1964 Tokyo	Fencing	Men's Épée team
77.	Ildikó Rejtő	(Japan) 1964 Tokyo	Fencing	Women's Foil individual
78.	Judit Ágoston; Lídia Dömölky; Katalin Juhász; Paula Marosi; Ildikó Rejtő	(Japan) 1964 Tokyo	Fencing	Women's Foil team
79.	Men's football team: Ferenc Bene Tibor Csernai János Farkas József Gelei Kálmán Ihász Sándor Katona Imre Komora Ferenc Nógrádi Dezső Novák Árpád Orbán Károly Palotai Antal Szentmihályi Gusztáv Szepesi Zoltán Varga	(Japan) 1964 Tokyo	Football	Men's tournament
80.	Ferenc Török	(Japan) 1964 Tokyo	Modern Pentathlon	Men's Individual competition
81.	László Hammerl	(Japan) 1964 Tokyo	Shooting	Men's 50 m rifle prone
82.	Men's water polo team: Miklós Ambrus András Bodnár Ottó Boros Zoltán Dömötör László Felkai Dezső Gyarmati Tivadar Kanizsa György Kárpáti János Konrád II Mihály Mayer Dénes Pócsik Péter Rusorán	(Japan) 1964 Tokyo	Water polo	Men's tournament
83.	Imre Polyák	(Japan) 1964 Tokyo	Wrestling	Greco-Roman featherweight
84.	István Kozma	(Japan) 1964 Tokyo	Wrestling	Greco-Roman heavyweight
85.	Gyula Zsivótzky	1968 Mexico City	Athletics	Men's Hammer throw
86.	Angéla Németh	1968 Mexico City	Athletics	Women's Javelin throw
87.	Tibor Tatai	1968 Mexico City	Canoeing	Men's C-1 1000 m
88.	Mihály Hesz	1968 Mexico City	Canoeing	Men's K-1 1000 m
89.	Győző Kulcsár	1968 Mexico City	Fencing	Men's Épée individual
90.	Pál B. Nagy; Csaba Fenyvesi; Győző Kulcsár; Zoltán Nemere; Pál Schmitt	1968 Mexico City	Fencing	Men's Épée team
91.	Men's football team: István Básti Antal Dunai II Lajos Dunai Károly Fatér László Fazekas István Juhász László Keglovich Lajos Kocsis Iván Menczel László Nagy Ernő Noskó Dezső Novák Miklós Páncsics István Sárközi Miklós Szalai Zoltán Szarka Lajos Szűcs	1968 Mexico City	Football	Men's tournament
92.	András Balczó; István Móna; Ferenc Török	1968 Mexico City	Modern pentathlon	Men's Team competition
93.	János Varga	1968 Mexico City	Wrestling	Greco-Roman bantamweight
94.	István Kozma	1968 Mexico City	Wrestling	Greco-Roman heavyweight
95.	György Gedó	(West Germany) 1972 Munich	Boxing	Men's Light flyweight
96.	Csaba Fenyvesi	(West Germany) 1972 Munich	Fencing	Men's Individual Épée
97.	Sándor Erdős; Csaba Fenyvesi; Győző Kulcsár; István Osztrics; Pál Schmitt	(West Germany) 1972 Munich	Fencing	Men's Team Épée
98.	András Balczó	(West Germany) 1972 Munich	Modern Pentathlon	Men's Individual Competition
99.	Imre Földi	(West Germany) 1972 Munich	Weightlifting	Men's Bantamweight
100.	Csaba Hegedűs	(West Germany) 1972 Munich	Wrestling	Greco-Roman Middleweight
101.	Miklós Németh	(Canada) 1976 Montreal	Athletics	Men's Javelin throw
102.	Ildikó Schwarczenberger	(Canada) 1976 Montreal	Fencing	Women's Individual Foil
103.	Zoltán Magyar	(Canada) 1976 Montreal	Gymnastics	Pommel Horse
104.	Gábor Csapó; Tibor Cservenyák; Tamás Faragó; György Gerendás; György Horkai; György Kenéz; Ferenc Konrád; Endre Molnár; László Sárosi; Attila Sudár; István Szívós, Jr.	(Canada) 1976 Montreal	Water Polo	Men's Water Polo Competition
105.	László Foltán; István Vaskúti	(Soviet Union) 1980 Moscow	Canoe / Kayak Flatwater	C-2 500 m
106.	Zoltán Magyar	(Soviet Union) 1980 Moscow	Gymnastics	Pommel Horse
107.	Károly Varga	(Soviet Union) 1980 Moscow	Shooting	Men's Small Bore Rifle - Prone Position
108.	Sándor Wladár	(Soviet Union) 1980 Moscow	Swimming	Men's 200 m Backstroke
109.	Péter Baczakó	(Soviet Union) 1980 Moscow	Weightlifting	Men's 90 kg (Middle-Heavyweight)
110.	Ferenc Kocsis	(Soviet Union) 1980 Moscow	Wrestling	Greco-Roman 74 kg (Welterweight)
111.	Norbert Növényi	(Soviet Union) 1980 Moscow	Wrestling	Greco-Roman 90 kg (Light-Heavyweight)
112.	Zsolt Gyulai	(South Korea) 1988 Seoul	Canoe / Kayak Flatwater	Men's K-1 500 m
113.	Attila Ábrahám; Ferenc Csipes; Zsolt Gyulai; Sándor Hódosi	(South Korea) 1988 Seoul	Canoe / Kayak Flatwater	Men's K-4 1000 m
114.	Imre Bujdosó; László Csongrádi; Imre Gedővári; György Nébald; Bence Szabó	(South Korea) 1988 Seoul	Fencing	Men's Team Sabre
115.	Zsolt Borkai	(South Korea) 1988 Seoul	Gymnastics	Pommel Horse
116.	János Martinek	(South Korea) 1988 Seoul	Modern Pentathlon	Men's Individual Competition
117.	László Fábián; János Martinek; Attila Mizsér	(South Korea) 1988 Seoul	Modern Pentathlon	Men's Team Competition
118.	József Szabó	(South Korea) 1988 Seoul	Swimming	Men's 200 m Breaststroke
119.	Tamás Darnyi	(South Korea) 1988 Seoul	Swimming	Men's 200 m Individual Medley
120.	Tamás Darnyi	(South Korea) 1988 Seoul	Swimming	Men's 400 m Individual Medley
121.	Krisztina Egerszegi	(South Korea) 1988 Seoul	Swimming	Women's 200 m Backstroke
122.	András Sike	(South Korea) 1988 Seoul	Wrestling	Greco-Roman 57 kg (Bantamweight)
123.	Kinga Czigány; Éva Dónusz; Rita Kőbán; Erika Mészáros	(Spain) 1992 Barcelona	Canoe / Kayak Flatwater	Women's K-4 500 m
124.	Bence Szabó	(Spain) 1992 Barcelona	Fencing	Men's Individual Sabre
125.	Henrietta Ónodi	(Spain) 1992 Barcelona	Gymnastics	Women's Vault
126.	Antal Kovács	(Spain) 1992 Barcelona	Judo	Men's 95 kg
127.	Tamás Darnyi	(Spain) 1992 Barcelona	Swimming	Men's 200 m Individual Medley
128.	Tamás Darnyi	(Spain) 1992 Barcelona	Swimming	Men's 400 m Individual Medley
129.	Krisztina Egerszegi	(Spain) 1992 Barcelona	Swimming	Women's 100 m Backstroke
130.	Krisztina Egerszegi	(Spain) 1992 Barcelona	Swimming	Women's 200 m Backstroke
131.	Krisztina Egerszegi	(Spain) 1992 Barcelona	Swimming	Women's 400 m Individual Medley
132.	Attila Repka	(Spain) 1992 Barcelona	Wrestling	Men's 68 kg (Lightweight)
133.	Péter Farkas	(Spain) 1992 Barcelona	Wrestling	Men's 82 kg (Middleweight)
134.	Balázs Kiss	(United States) 1996 Atlanta	Athletics	Men's Hammer throw
135.	István Kovács	(United States) 1996 Atlanta	Boxing	Men's Bantamweight
136.	Csaba Horváth; György Kolonics	(United States) 1996 Atlanta	Canoe / Kayak Flatwater	Men's C-2 500 m
137.	Rita Kőbán	(United States) 1996 Atlanta	Canoe / Kayak Flatwater	Women's K-1 500 m
138.	Norbert Rózsa	(United States) 1996 Atlanta	Swimming	Men's 200 m Breaststroke
139.	Attila Czene	(United States) 1996 Atlanta	Swimming	Men's 200 m Individual Medley
140.	Krisztina Egerszegi	(United States) 1996 Atlanta	Swimming	Women's 200 m Backstroke
141.	György Kolonics	(Australia) 2000 Sydney	Canoe / Kayak Flatwater	Men's C-1 500 m
142.	Ferenc Novák; Imre Pulai	(Australia) 2000 Sydney	Canoe / Kayak Flatwater	Men's C-2 500 m
143.	Zoltán Kammerer; Botond Storcz	(Australia) 2000 Sydney	Canoe / Kayak Flatwater	Men's K-2 500 m
144.	Gábor Horváth; Zoltán Kammerer; Botond Storcz; Ákos Vereckei	(Australia) 2000 Sydney	Canoe / Kayak Flatwater	Men's K-4 1000 m
145.	Tímea Nagy	(Australia) 2000 Sydney	Fencing	Women's Individual Épée
146.	Szilveszter Csollány	(Australia) 2000 Sydney	Gymnastics	Rings
147.	Ágnes Kovács	(Australia) 2000 Sydney	Swimming	Women's 200 m Breaststroke
148.	Tibor Benedek; Péter Biros; Rajmund Fodor; Tamás Kásás; Gergely Kiss; Zoltán Kósz; Tamás Marcz; Tamás Molnár; Barnabás Steinmetz; Zoltán Szécsi; Bulcsú Székely; Zsolt Varga I Attila Vári	(Australia) 2000 Sydney	Water Polo	Men's Water Polo Competition
149.	Gábor Horváth; Zoltán Kammerer; Botond Storcz; Ákos Vereckei	(Greece) 2004 Athens	Canoe/Kayak	Men's K-4 1000 m
150.	Natasa Janics	(Greece) 2004 Athens	Canoe/Kayak	Women's K-1 500 m
151.	Natasa Janics; Katalin Kovács	(Greece) 2004 Athens	Canoe/Kayak	Women's K-2 500 m
152.	Tímea Nagy	(Greece) 2004 Athens	Fencing	Women's Individual Épée
153.	Zsuzsanna Vörös	(Greece) 2004 Athens	Modern Pentathlon	Women's Individual Competition
154.	Diána Igaly	(Greece) 2004 Athens	Shooting	Women's Skeet
155.	Tibor Benedek; Péter Biros; Rajmund Fodor; István Gergely; Tamás Kásás; Gergely Kiss; Norbert Madaras; Tamás Molnár; Ádám Steinmetz; Barnabás Steinmetz; Zoltán Szécsi; Tamás Varga; Attila Vári	(Greece) 2004 Athens	Water Polo	Men's Water Polo Competition
156.	István Majoros	(Greece) 2004 Athens	Wrestling	Men's 55 kg
157.	Attila Vajda	(China) 2008 Beijing	Canoe/Kayak	Men's C-1 1000 metres
158.	Natasa Janics; Katalin Kovács	(China) 2008 Beijing	Canoe/Kayak	Women's K-2 500 m
159.	Zoltán Szécsi; Tamás Varga; Norbert Madaras; Dénes Varga; Tamás Kásás; Norbert Hosnyánszky; Gergely Kiss; Tibor Benedek; Dániel Varga; Péter Biros; Gábor Kis; Tamás Molnár; István Gergely	(China) 2008 Beijing	Water Polo	Men's Water Polo Competition
160.	Áron Szilágyi	(United Kingdom) 2012 London	Fencing	Men's Individual Sabre
161.	Dániel Gyurta	(United Kingdom) 2012 London	Swimming	Men's 200m Breaststroke
162.	Krisztián Berki	(United Kingdom) 2012 London	Gymnastics	Men's Pommel Horse
163.	Krisztián Pars	(United Kingdom) 2012 London	Athletics	Men's Hammer throw
164.	Rudolf Dombi; Roland Kökény	(United Kingdom) 2012 London	Canoe/Kayak	Men's Kayak Double (K2) 1000m
165.	Krisztina Fazekas; Katalin Kovács; Danuta Kozák; Gabriella Szabó	(United Kingdom) 2012 London	Canoe/Kayak	Women's Kayak Four (K4) 500m
166.	Danuta Kozák	(United Kingdom) 2012 London	Canoe/Kayak	Women's Kayak Single (K1) 500m
167.	Éva Risztov	(United Kingdom) 2012 London	Swimming	Women's 10 km Marathon
168.	Emese Szász	(Brazil) 2016 Rio de Janeiro	Fencing	Women's Individual Épée
169.	Katinka Hosszú	(Brazil) 2016 Rio de Janeiro	Swimming	Women's 400 m individual medley
170.	Katinka Hosszú	(Brazil) 2016 Rio de Janeiro	Swimming	Women's 100 m backstroke
171.	Katinka Hosszú	(Brazil) 2016 Rio de Janeiro	Swimming	Women's 200 m individual medley
172.	Áron Szilágyi	(Brazil) 2016 Rio de Janeiro	Fencing	Men's sabre
173.	Gabriella Szabó; Danuta Kozák	(Brazil) 2016 Rio de Janeiro	Canoe/Kayak	Women's K-2 500 m
174.	Danuta Kozák	(Brazil) 2016 Rio de Janeiro	Canoe/Kayak	Women's K-1 500 m
175.	Tamara Csipes; Krisztina Fazekas-Zur; Danuta Kozák; Gabriella Szabó	(Brazil) 2016 Rio de Janeiro	Canoe/Kayak	Women's K-4 500 m
176.	Csaba Burján; Viktor Knoch; Shaoang Liu; Shaolin Sándor Liu	(South Korea) 2018 Pyeongchang	Short track speed skating	Men's 5000 metre relay
177.	Áron Szilágyi	(Japan) 2020 Tokyo	Fencing	Men's sabre
178.	Kristóf Milák	(Japan) 2020 Tokyo	Swimming	Men's 200 m butterfly
179.	Bálint Kopasz	(Japan) 2020 Tokyo	Canoe/Kayak	Men's K-1 1000 metres
180.	Tamás Lőrincz	(Japan) 2020 Tokyo	Wrestling	Men's Greco-Roman 77 kg
181.	Sándor Tótka	(Japan) 2020 Tokyo	Canoe/Kayak	Men's K-1 200 metres
182.	Dóra Bodonyi; Tamara Csipes; Anna Kárász; Danuta Kozák	(Japan) 2020 Tokyo	Canoe/Kayak	Women's K-4 500 metres
183.	Shaoang Liu	(China) 2022 Beijing	Short track speed skating	Men's 500 metres
184.	Hubert Kós	(France) 2024 Paris	Swimming	Men's 200 m backstroke
185.	Tibor Andrásfi; Máté Tamás Koch; Gergely Siklósi; Dávid Nagy	(France) 2024 Paris	Fencing	Men's team épée
186.	Kristóf Milák	(France) 2024 Paris	Swimming	Men's 100 m butterfly
187.	Kristóf Rasovszky	(France) 2024 Paris	Swimming	Men's 10 km marathon
188.	Viviana Márton	(France) 2024 Paris	Taekwondo	Women's 67 kg
189.	Michelle Gulyás	(France) 2024 Paris	Modern pentathlon	Women's individual

== Notes ==
1. The order of the list is decided by 1. year of the Games; 2. Name of sport (alphabetical); 3. Name of event (alphabetical) until Athens 2004. Hopefully I will be able to refresh the list from Beijing 2008.
2. In team events, the order of the members of the certain team is decided by surname of the member (alphabetical).

== Sources ==
- Hungarian Olympic Triumph!
- http://www.mob.hu
- http://www.olympic.org
