= 1970 African Cup of Nations final =

- Event: 1970 African Cup of Nations
Sudan	Ghana
(Sudan)	(Ghana)
1	0
- Date: 16 February 1970
- Venue: Municipal Stadium, Khartoum
- Referee: Gebreyesus Tesfaye (Ethiopia)
- Attendance: 12,187

The 1970 African Cup of Nations final was a football match that took place on 16 February 1970, at the Municipal Stadium in Khartoum, to determine the winner of the 1970 African Cup of Nations. Sudan defeated Ghana 1–0 with one goal from Hasabu El-Sagheer to win their first African Cup.

== Road to the final ==
Sudan		Ghana	
Opponents	Results	Opponents	Results
Group stage
Ethiopia	3–0	Congo-Kinshasa	2–0
Ivory Coast	0–1	United Arab Rep.	1–1
Cameroon	2–1	Guinea	1–1
Semi-finals
United Arab Rep.	2–1 (a.e.t.)	Ivory Coast	2–1 (a.e.t.)

== Match ==
=== Details ===
16 February 1970
--:-- UTC+2

Sudan	1–0	Ghana
Hasabu El-Sagheer 12'	Report

Municipal Stadium, Khartoum
Attendance: 12,187
Referee: Gebreyesus Tesfaye (Ethiopia)

GK	Abdelaziz Abdallah Abdelrahman
DF	Samir Salih
DF	Amin Zaki (c)
DF	Suliman Abdelgadir
DF	El-Sir Kaunda
MF	Ahmed Bushara Wahba
MF	Nasr Eddin "Jaksa" Abbas
MF	Ahmed Bushara Wahba
FW	Hasabu El-Sagheer
FW	Ezzeldin Osman
FW	Ali Gagarin
Manager:
(Sudan) Abdel-Fattah Hamad Abu-Zeid

GK	Robert Mensah
DF	John Eshun (c)
DF	Alex Mingle
DF	Edward Boye
MF	Kwasi Owusu
MF	Ibrahim Sunday
MF	Robert Foley
MF	Cecil Jones Attuquayefio
FW	Joseph Ghartey
FW	Malik Jabir
FW	Kwasi Owusu
Manager:
(Germany) Karl-Heinz Marotzke

Assistant referees:
...
...
