= 1968 African Cup of Nations final =

- Event: 1968 African Cup of Nations
Congo-Kinshasa	Ghana
(Democratic Republic of the Congo)	(Ghana)
1	0
- Date: 21 January 1968
- Venue: Hailé Sélassié Stadium, Addis Ababa
- Referee: Ad-Diba (Egypt)
- Attendance: 25,000

The 1968 African Cup of Nations final was a football match that took place on 21 January 1968, at the Hailé Sélassié Stadium in Addis Ababa, to determine the winner of the 1968 African Cup of Nations. Congo-Kinshasa defeated Ghana 1–0 with one goal from Kalala to win their first African Cup.

== Road to the final ==
Congo-KInshasa		Ghana	
Opponents	Results	Opponents	Results
Group stage
Congo-Brazzaville	3–0	Senegal	2–2
Ghana	0–1	Congo-Kinshasa	1–0
Senegal	2–1	Congo-Brazzaville	3–1
Semi-finals
Ethiopia	3–2 (a.e.t.)	Ivory Coast	4–3

== Match ==
=== Details ===
21 January 1968
--:-- UTC+2

Congo-Kinshasa	1–0	Ghana
Kalala 66'	Report

Hailé Sélassié Stadium, Addis Ababa
Attendance: 25,000
Referee: Ad-Diba (Egypt)

GK	Robert Kazadi
DF	Pierre Katumba
DF	Salomon "Général" Mange (c)
DF	Albert Mwanza
DF	Elias Tshimanga
MF	Joseph Kibonge
MF	Raoul Kidumu
MF	Kembo Uba Kembo
FW	Léon Mungamuni
FW	Pierre Mwana Kasongo
FW	Kalala
Manager:
(Hungary) Ferenc Csanádi

GK	Jon Bortey Noawy
DF	Franklin Crentsil
DF	Charles Addo Odametey (c)
DF	John Eshun
DF	Ben Kusi
MF	Osei Kofi
MF	Ibrahim Sunday
MF	Frank Odoi
FW	Cecil Jones Attuquayefio
FW	Malik Jabir
FW	Wilberforce Mfum
Manager:
(Brazil) Carlos Alberto Parreira

Assistant referees:
...
...
