= 2015 Africa Cup of Nations final =

International football match

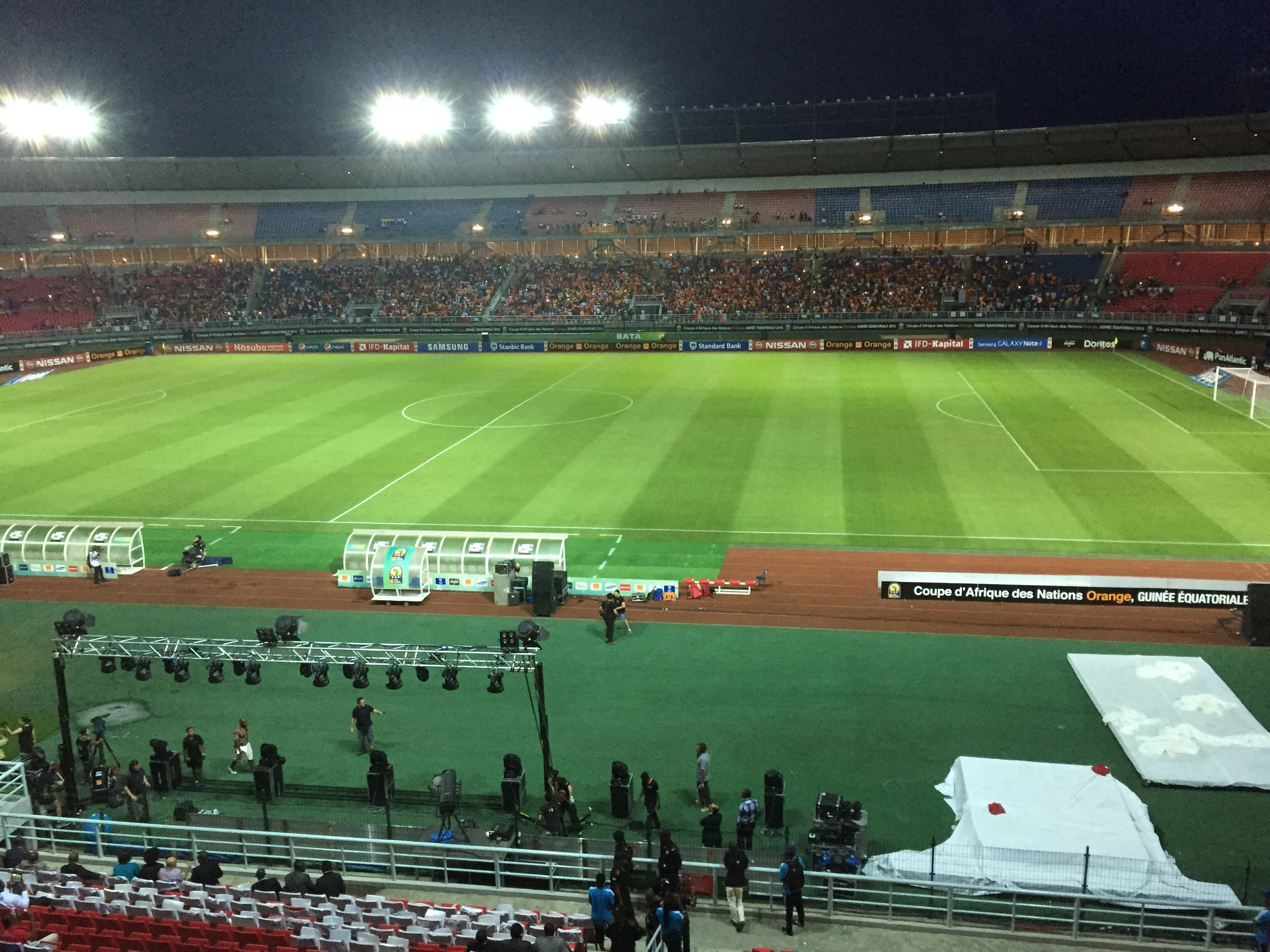
- The Estadio de Bata hosted the final
- Event: 2015 Africa Cup of Nations
Ghana	Ivory Coast
(Ghana)	(Ivory Coast)
0	0
- After extra time; Ivory Coast won 9–8 on penalties
- Date: 8 February 2015
- Venue: Estadio de Bata, Bata
- Man of the Match: Afriyie Acquah (Ghana)
- Fair Player of the Match: Wilfried Bony (Ivory Coast)
- Referee: Bakary Gassama (Gambia)
- Attendance: 32,857

The 2015 Africa Cup of Nations final was a football match that took place on 8 February 2015 to determine the winner of the 2015 Africa Cup of Nations, the football championship of Africa organised by the Confederation of African Football (CAF). The match was held at the Estadio de Bata in Bata, Equatorial Guinea, and was contested by Ghana and Ivory Coast. Ghana reached the final by winning their qualifying group and then defeating Guinea and Equatorial Guinea in the quarter-final and semi-final. Ivory Coast also qualified as group winners, after which they beat Algeria and the Democratic Republic of the Congo.

The final was 0–0 at the end of normal time, and there were also no goals in extra time, with few clear-cut chances for either team. Ivory Coast had the game's only shot on target at 12 minutes, when Yaya Touré cleared the Ghanaian wall with a free kick, but his shot went straight to Ghanaian goalkeeper Brimah Razak. Ghana's Christian Atsu had what writers for France 24 named the best chance of the match when he hit the goalpost from 30 yards (27 m) on 25 minutes, from an André Ayew pass. Ayew himself also hit the goalpost on 41 minutes. With the match finishing level, it was decided by a penalty shoot-out. Ghana took a 2–0 lead, after Wilfried Bony and Junior Tallo both missed for Ivory Coast. Ivorian goalkeeper Boubacar Barry then produced a save against Afriyie Acquah, before Frank Acheampong missed Ghana's fourth penalty kick, and the teams were level. They then scored six more penalties each. After every outfield player had taken a shot, the match was decided by Barry, who saved an attempt from Ghana goalkeeper Razak and then scored past Razak himself to give the Ivory Coast a 9–8 shoot-out win and the title.

The victory was Ivory Coast's second Africa Cup of Nations victory, after they had beaten Ghana in the 1992 final, also on penalties. It lifted them from 3rd place to 2nd place among African nations in the FIFA World Rankings. In summarising the final, BBC Sport reporters noted that Ghana's defeat was "perhaps a little harsh". Ghana's Acquah was named as the man of the match. After returning home, the Ivory Coast players took part in a victory parade in the country's commercial capital Abidjan. They failed to defend the Africa Cup of Nations at the next tournament in 2017, being eliminated in the group stage.

== Background ==
The Africa Cup of Nations, organised by the Confederation of African Football (CAF), is the primary international association football competition for African national teams. The 2015 tournament was the 30th edition since its inauguration in 1957. Morocco was originally chosen to host the event, but the country requested a postponement because of the Western African Ebola virus epidemic. CAF refused, and instead moved the event to Equatorial Guinea in 2014. The tournament consisted of sixteen teams who had qualified for the event, divided into four round-robin groups consisting of four teams. The two top teams from each group advanced to a knock-out phase.

The Ivory Coast appeared in their 20th Africa Cup of Nations tournament, their sole victory coming in 1992 when they defeated Ghana on sudden death in a penalty shootout at the end of a goalless draw. They later played in the final in 2006 and 2012, losing in shootouts after goalless draws against Egypt and Zambia respectively. Ghana also appeared in their 20th tournament, and their 9th final. They had previously won 4 (1963, 1965, 1978, 1982) and lost 4 (1968, 1970, 1992, 2010).

At the start of the tournament, Ivory Coast were 3rd among African nations FIFA World Rankings (28th in the world), while Ghana were 5th (37th in the world).

== Route to the final ==
=== Ghana ===
Ghana's route to the final
	Opponent	Result
1	Senegal	1–2
2	Algeria	1–0
3	South Africa	2–1
QF	Guinea	3–0
SF	Equatorial Guinea	3–0

Ghana were in the tournament's Group C, alongside Algeria, Senegal and South Africa. CAF labelled this the "group of death" as a result of the strength of the four teams. Ghana's opening game took place on 19 January 2015, against Senegal in Mongomo. Ghana took the lead on 14 minutes through a penalty by André Ayew, after Christian Atsu had been fouled, but Senegal equalised in the second half through Mame Biram Diouf. Moussa Sow, a Senegalese substitute, then scored in the third minute of injury time, to give his team a 2–1 win. In their second game, Ghana faced Algeria on 23 January in Mongomo. The match remained goalless until injury time at the end in the second half, when Ghana took the lead as Asamoah Gyan scored from a long pass by Mubarak Wakaso. Going into the final pair of games in the group, all four nations had an opportunity to qualify for the quarter-finals, but wins for Ghana and Algeria ensured they qualified in first and second place respectively. Ghana fell behind to a volley by South African Mandla Masango in their game, played on 27 January in Mongomo, but a John Boye equaliser on 73 minutes, followed by an Ayew goal gave them a 2–1 win and first place in the group.

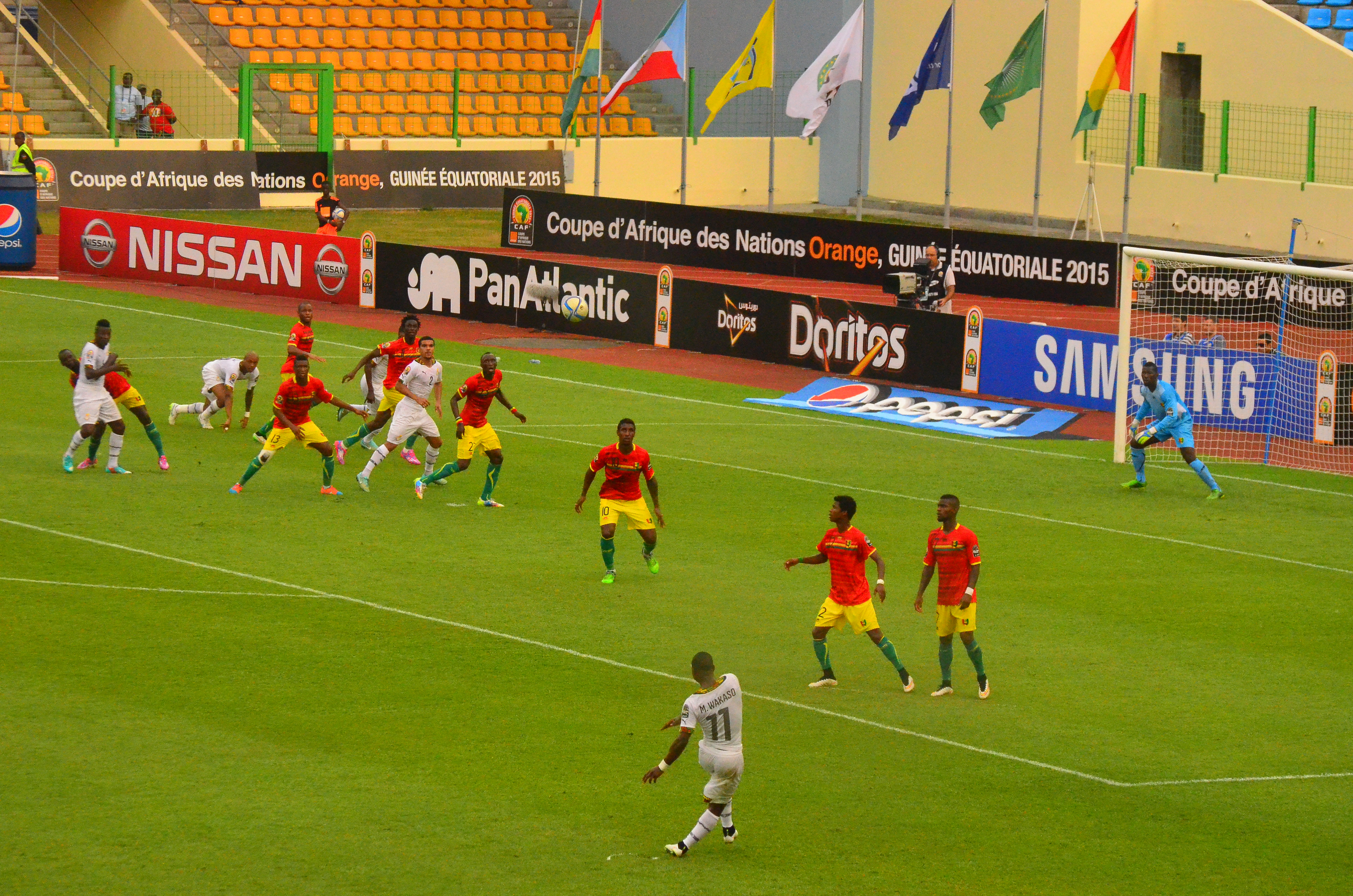
Ghana playing against Guinea at the quarter-final.

Ghana's quarter-final took place in Malabo against Guinea, on 1 February 2015. Against a team described by reporters for BBC Sport as "poor", Ghana scored their opening goal after 4 minutes as Atsu kicked the ball into the goal from Ayew's back-heeled pass. They added a second goal just before half time, Kwesi Appiah scoring after a failed clearance by Guinea's Baïssama Sankoh. Atsu scored again on 61 minutes to complete a 3–0 win for Ghana. Their semi-final match took place four days later, also in Malabo, against hosts Equatorial Guinea. Referee Eric Otogo-Castane awarded Ghana a penalty after 41 minutes for a foul on Appiah, which was vociferously disputed by Equatorial Guinea. Ayew scored the penalty, and Equatorial Guinea attempted to restart the game, but Otogo-Castane ordered them to wait until Ghana had finished celebrating. The home supporters began throwing bottles towards Ghana's substitutes on the sideline. Ghana doubled their lead through Wakaso just before half time and then added a third through Ayew on 75 minutes. At this point, the match had to be delayed for 40 minutes as the Equatorial Guinea supporters began an attack on the Ghana supporters. The police responded by sending a helicopter, which flew within 30 feet (9 m) of the crowd and deployed smoke bombs. The Ghana team's Twitter feed later likened the events to "a war zone". Play eventually resumed and with no further goals scored, Ghana completed a 3–0 win.

=== Ivory Coast ===
Ivory Coast's route to the final
	Opponent	Result
1	Guinea	1–1
2	Mali	1–1
3	Cameroon	1–0
QF	Algeria	3–1
SF	DR Congo	3–1

Ivory Coast began their campaign with a match against Guinea in Group D, on 20 January in Malabo. Guinea, who had not been able to play any home games during qualification due to the Ebola epidemic, took the lead after 36 minutes through a Mohamed Yattara volley. Ivory Coast's Gervinho, labelled "by far the game's best player" by BBC Sport's online commentary, was sent off for hitting Naby Keïta in the face after 58 minutes, but Ivory Coast earned a draw with a Seydou Doumbia equaliser on 72 minutes. In Ivory Coast's second group game, they faced their neighbours Mali on 24 January, again in Malabo. In a game described by writers for Reuters as "bad-tempered", Ivory Coast fell behind to a Bakary Sako volley on 7 minutes, but Max Gradel earned a 1–1 draw for Ivory Coast shortly before the end. With all four games having ended 1–1, there was nothing to separate the four Group D teams going into the final pair of games. Ivory Coast faced Cameroon in their game, playing for a third time in Malabo, and they earned a 1–0 win through Gradel's 20-yard (18 m) shot on 35 minutes. This was sufficient to win the group, as the other game between Guinea and Mali finished in another 1–1 draw.

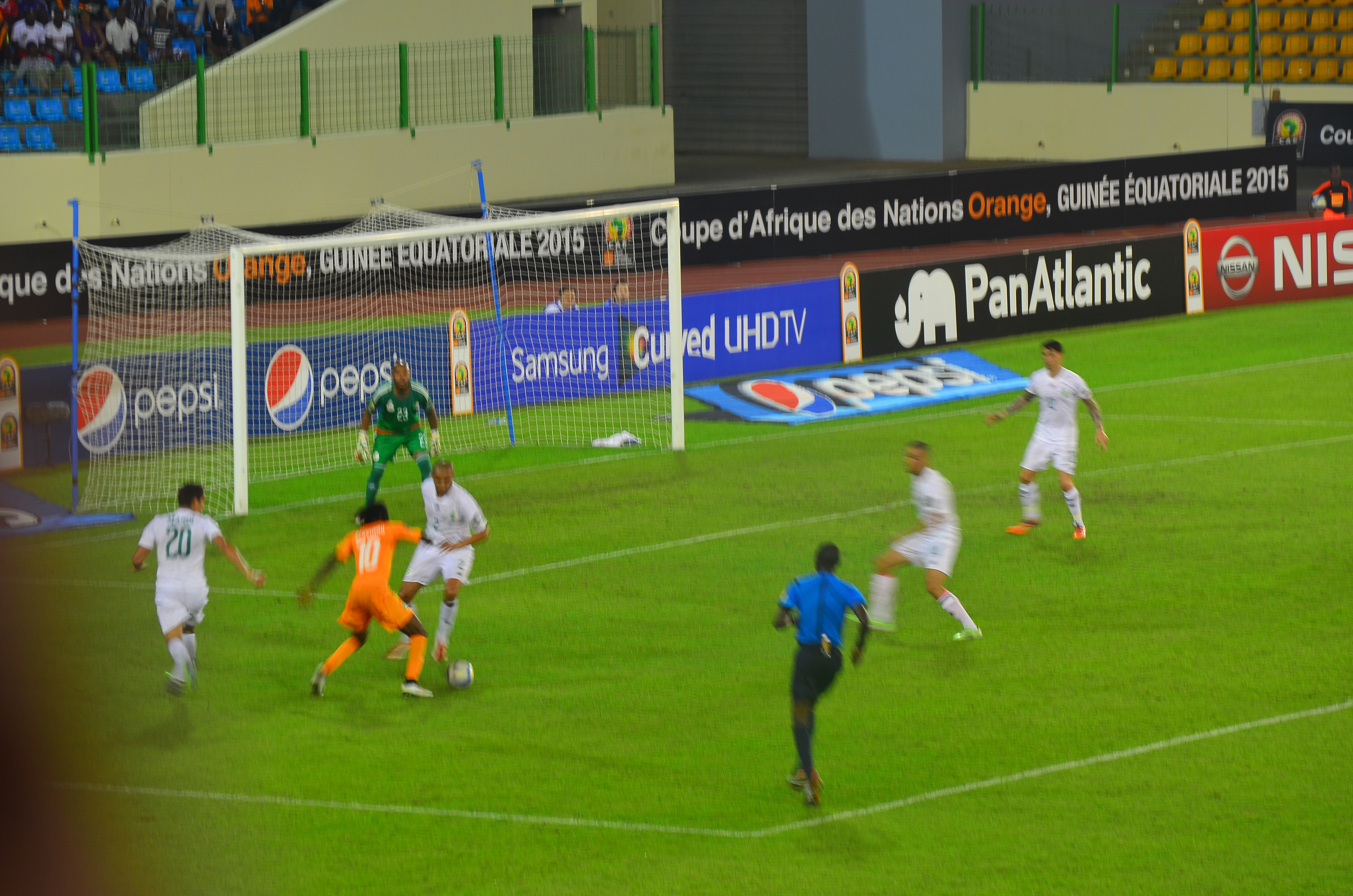
Ivory Coast playing against Algeria at the quarter-final.

Ivory Coast returned to Malabo for their quarter-final, in which they faced Algeria on 1 February. Wilfried Bony scored the opening goal for Ivory Coast on 26 minutes, following a Gradel cross. Despite Ivory Coast having more possession than Algeria after half time, Hillal Soudani scored an equaliser after 51 minutes, before Bony restored his team's advantage with a header on 68 minutes. Algeria applied pressure as they sought to equalise again, amid some poor Ivorian defending, but Ivory Coast held on and added a third goal through Gervinho in the 4th minute of injury time to seal a 3–1 win. Ivory Coast's semi-final took place on 4 February, against the Democratic Republic of the Congo at the Estadio de Bata. Yaya Touré scored for the Ivory Coast on 21 minutes, but their lead lasted only 3 minutes as Dieumerci Mbokani scored a penalty equaliser following a handball. They retook the lead through Gervinho shortly before half-time, and a goal by Wilfried Kanon midway through the second half completed their second consecutive 3–1 win and a place in the final.

== Match ==
The game kicked off at 8 pm local time (7 pm UTC), at the Estadio de Bata. The referee for the game was Bakary Gassama of the Gambia, and the attendance was 32,857. Ivory Coast wore an all orange kit, while Ghana's was entirely white.

=== First half ===
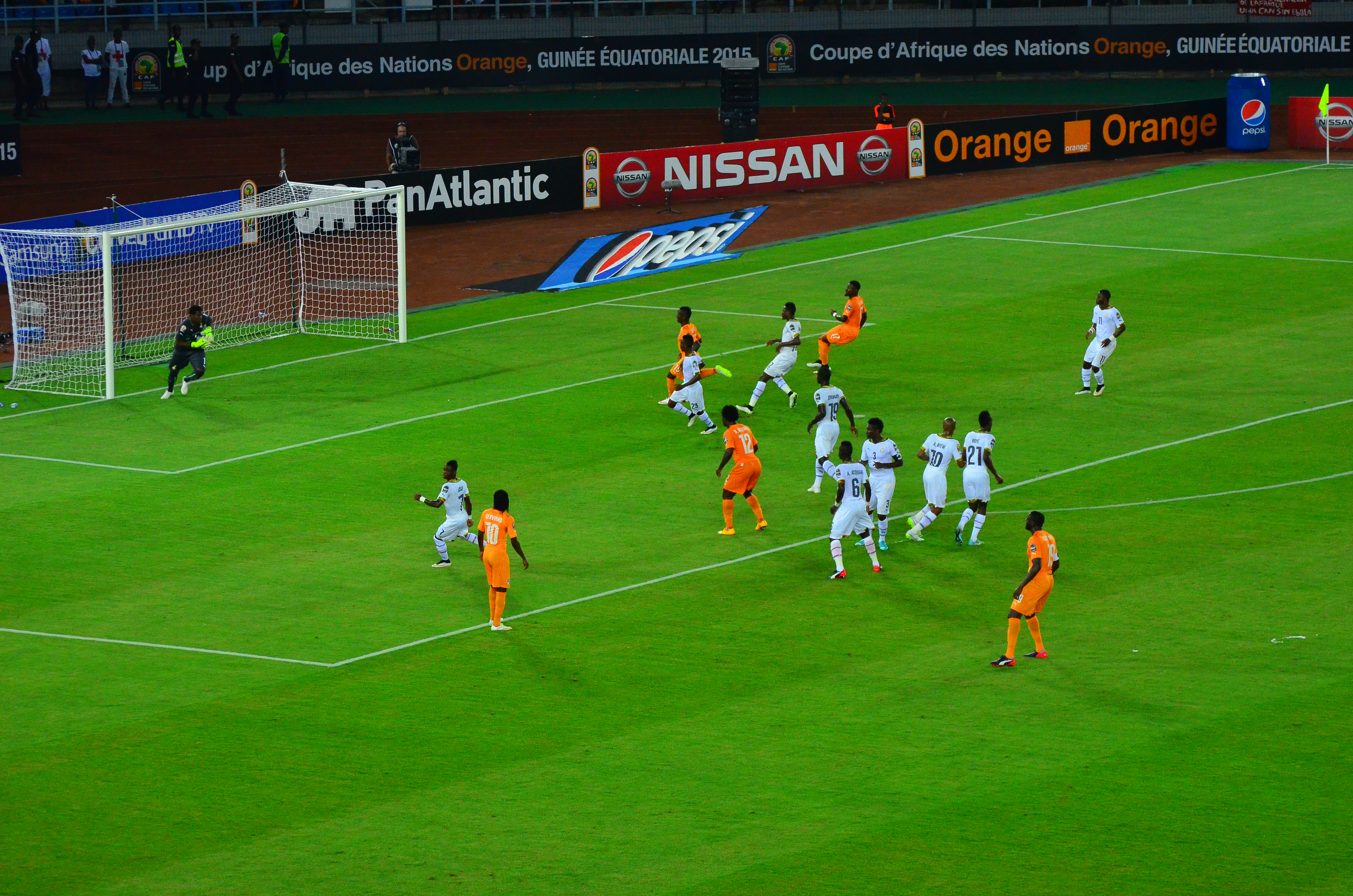
Both teams playing during the first half

Ivory Coast won an early corner kick, but it was cleared by Appiah with Serey Dié's long-range follow-up easily blocked. Yaya Touré had the first chance to score in the game on 12 minutes; he cleared the wall with a free kick, but the shot went straight to Ghanaian goalkeeper Brimah Razak, who caught it. This eventually proved to be the only shot on target in the entire match. Ivory Coast had another chance shortly afterwards, when Gradel shot wide following a pass from Gervinho, but the sides were relatively equal in the opening. Ghana's players made a series of long passes intended to reach Atsu, but Ivory Coast were able to defend all of these. Dié received the first booking of the evening on 15 minutes for a studs-first foul on Wakaso. Gyan then stamped on Eric Bailly's toes on 22 minutes in an off-the-ball incident, but no foul was given. Atsu had the best chance of the game on 25 minutes, when he hit the goalpost from 30 yards (27 m) from an Ayew pass.

Ivory Coast launched an attack down the right on 33 minutes, through Bailly and Gradel, the latter attempting to find Gervinho in the penalty area. Despite a defensive error from Boye, Razak was able to collect the ball. Two minutes later, Atsu sent a cross into the Ivory Coast penalty area which Appiah was unable to reach, and two minutes after that Ghana hit the goalpost for a second time with a shot from Ayew. On 41 minutes, Appiah was one-on-one with the Ivorian goalkeeper Kanon, but failed to score. The first half ended with a score of 0–0, The Guardian's Alan Smith describing it as "tense, as one would expect of a final between two sides with little to choose between them, but entertaining nonetheless".

=== Second half ===
Ghana had the first opportunity to score in the second half on 52 minutes, when Harrison Afful passed the ball to Atsu on the right-hand side following a mistake by Ivory Coast, who in turn passed to Gyan in the centre. His shot went over the goal. Neither side had many chances in the second half, the midfield dominating the attackers on both sides. There were also many fouls by both sides. Ghana won a free kick on 68 minutes, after a handball by Dié, which was taken by Wakaso and headed just wide of the goal by Boye. Two minutes later, Wakaso himself took a shot from 30 yards (27 m) out but it went high over the crossbar. A run down the right flank by Atsu gave Ghana another attack one minute after that, but Gyan's shot from the resulting pass was blocked by Ivory Coast. Ivory Coast had a chance on 82 minutes, when Bony headed over the crossbar from a Tiene cross. They then had two opportunities to win the game in the final minute, first with a block by Razak which fell to Doumbia, who was unable to convert, and then when Razak fumbled the ball following an Aurier cross, but it did not reach any Ivorian players. The match remained 0–0 at the end of normal time, which meant 30 minutes of extra time were played.

=== Extra time ===
Ghana had the first opportunity of the second half on 93 minutes when Baba Rahman ran down the left-hand side, but Aurier was able to stop the attack with a diving block. On 99 minutes, Ghana's Afriyie Acquah hit a shot from 30 yards (27 m), but once again it went over the crossbar. Ghana made their first chance a minute later when Jordan Ayew came on for Appiah. His brother, André Ayew, crossed into the penalty area after 102 minutes, but there were no attackers or defenders in the vicinity and the ball bounced away. Two minutes later, Aurier crossed from the right for Ivory Coast, Bony clearing the ball behind. Bailly was then booked just before the extra period's half-time interval, for a foul on Jordan Ayew.

Wakaso ran towards the Ivorian goal early in the second period of extra time, but his 25-yard (23 m) shot was blocked by Tiene. Doumbia then had one of the best chances of extra time shortly afterwards, but he was unable to get a shot on goal as his control of the ball was described by Smith as "dismal". On 110 minutes, Jordan Ayew beat Yaya Touré in the penalty area, but his shot from a tight angle was blocked by Kolo Touré. Both teams made two substitutions as the penalty shoot-out approached, Frank Acheampong and Emmanuel Agyemang-Badu coming on for Ghana, while Tallo Gadji and Salomon Kalou came on for Ivory Coast. The game remained 0–0 at the end of extra time, the winner of the tournament being decided by a penalty shoot-out. In their report of the game, BBC Sport said "there was a sense of inevitability throughout the match that it would go the distance as neither team appeared to be prepared to take the risks that might bring a victory".

=== Penalty shoot-out ===
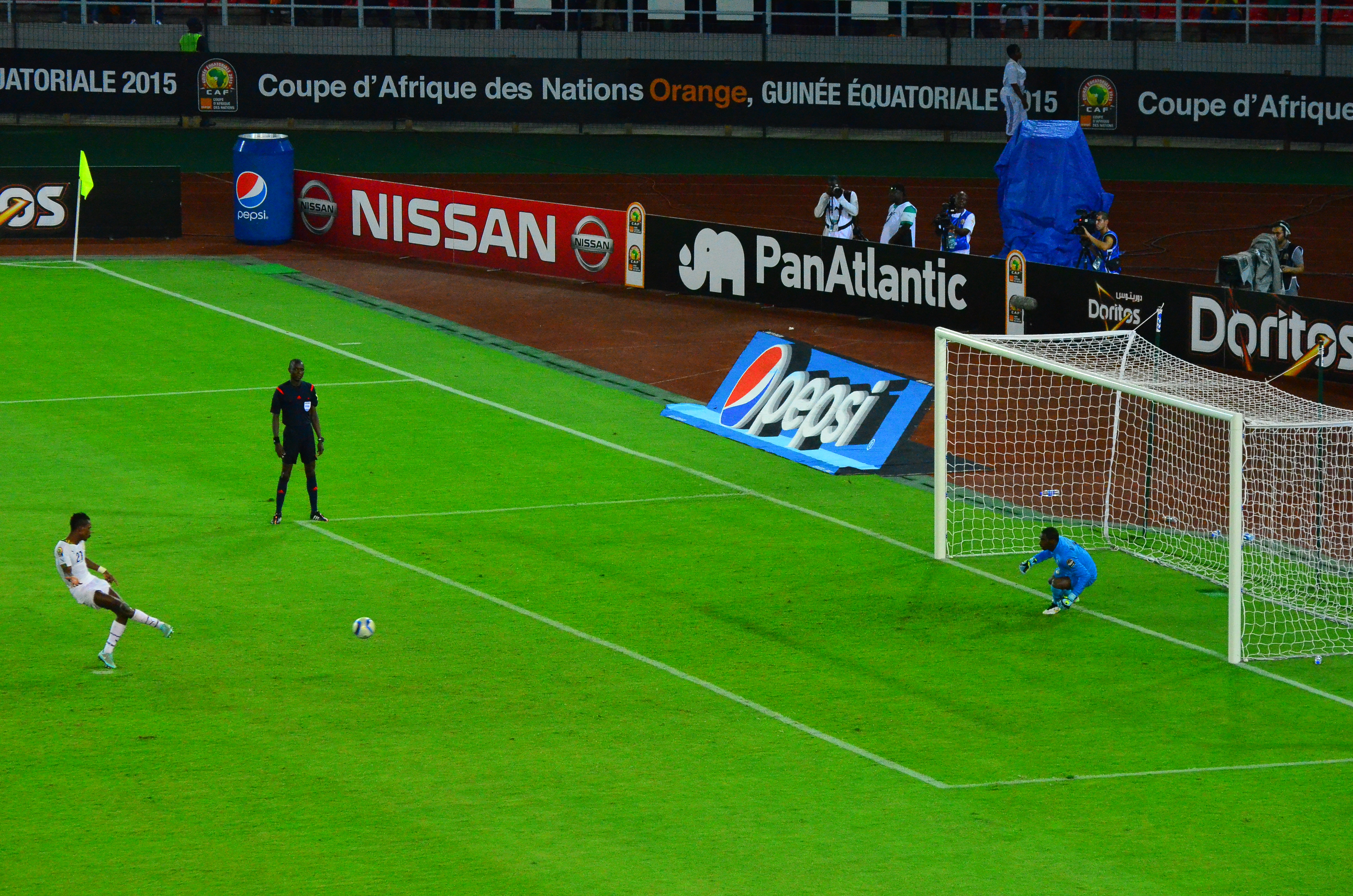
John Boye takes a penalty kick for Ghana.

Ghana's Wakaso took the first penalty of the shoot-out and scored, hitting the ball to the opposite side of the goal after Barry had dived to his left. Bony then missed his penalty for Ivory Coast, his shot hitting the crossbar. Ayew followed for Ghana and scored, and then Tallo, who had not touched the ball since coming on as a late substitute, missed for Ivory Coast, hitting his shot wide. The score was 2–0 to Ghana with both teams having taken two. Ghana then missed their next penalty, as Acquah's shot was saved by Barry. Aurier scored for Ivory Coast, and then Ghana missed again, Acheampong sending his left-footed shot wide of the goal. Doumbia scored for Ivory Coast to level the shoot-out at 2–2, and then Ayew and Yaya Touré both scored to give a score of 3–3 after the regulation five kicks.

The shoot-out was now in the sudden-death phase, but the next ten penalties were all successful. Jonathan Mensah, Agyemang-Badu, Afful, Baba and Boye all scored for Ghana, while Kalou, Kolo Touré, Kanon, Bailly and Dié scored for Ivory Coast. This gave a shoot-out score of 8–8. With all ten outfield players having had a turn, the two goalkeepers were required to take a kick each themselves. Razak, who was described by Smith as "not [looking] confident", took his penalty and it was saved by his opposite number. Barry required some medical attention to his wrist following the save, but he was able to take his kick and he scored past Razak to seal a 9–8 shoot-out victory and the title for Ivory Coast.

=== Details ===
8 February 2015
20:00

Ivory Coast	0–0 (a.e.t.)	Ghana
	Report
Penalties
Bony (penalty missed); Gadji (penalty missed); Aurier (penalty scored); Doumbia (penalty scored); Y. Touré (penalty scored); Kalou (penalty scored); K. Touré (penalty scored); Kanon (penalty scored); Bailly (penalty scored); Dié (penalty scored); Barry (penalty scored)	9–8	(penalty scored) Wakaso; (penalty scored) J. Ayew; (penalty missed) Acquah; (penalty missed) Acheampong; (penalty scored) A. Ayew; (penalty scored) Mensah; (penalty scored) Badu; (penalty scored) Afful; (penalty scored) Rahman; (penalty scored) Boye; (penalty missed) Razak

Estadio de Bata, Bata
Attendance: 32,857
Referee: Bakary Gassama (Gambia)

Ivory Coast	Ghana

GK	1	Boubacar Barry
CB	21	Eric Bailly	(yellow card) 105+1'
CB	4	Kolo Touré
CB	22	Wilfried Kanon	(yellow card) 87'
RM	17	Serge Aurier
CM	20	Serey Dié	(yellow card) 14'
CM	19	Yaya Touré (c)
LM	5	Siaka Tiéné	(yellow card) 57'	(substituted off) 116'
RF	15	Max Gradel		(substituted off) 67'
CF	12	Wilfried Bony
LF	10	Gervinho		(substituted off) 120+2'
Substitutions:
FW	7	Seydou Doumbia		(substituted on) 67'
FW	8	Salomon Kalou		(substituted on) 116'
FW	11	Tallo Gadji		(substituted on) 120+2'
Manager:
(France) Hervé Renard

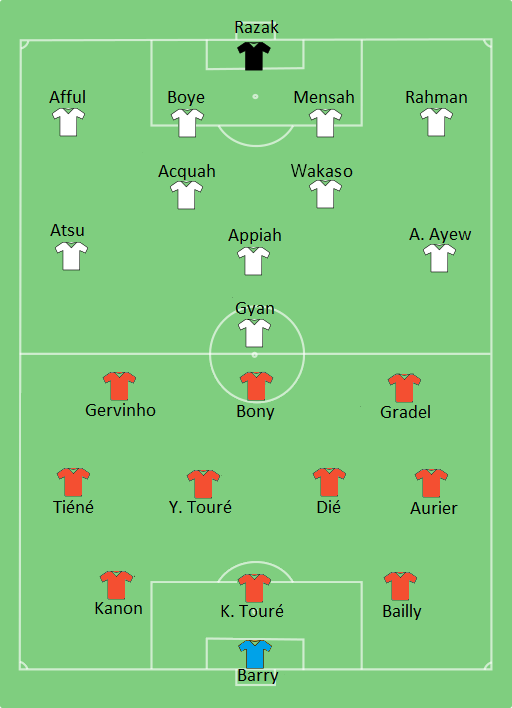

GK	1	Brimah Razak
RB	23	Harrison Afful
CB	21	John Boye
CB	19	Jonathan Mensah
LB	17	Baba Rahman
CM	6	Afriyie Acquah
CM	11	Mubarak Wakaso
RW	7	Christian Atsu	(substituted off) 116'
AM	2	Kwesi Appiah	(substituted off) 99'
LW	10	André Ayew
CF	3	Asamoah Gyan (c)	(substituted off) 120+1'
Substitutions:
FW	9	Jordan Ayew	(substituted on) 99'
FW	22	Frank Acheampong	(substituted on) 116'
MF	8	Emmanuel Agyemang-Badu	(substituted on) 120+1'
Manager:
(Israel) Avram Grant

Man of the Match:
Afriyie Acquah (Ghana)

Assistant referees:
Djibril Camara (Senegal)
Ali Waleed Ahmed (Sudan)
Fourth official:
Janny Sikazwe (Zambia)

== Post-match ==
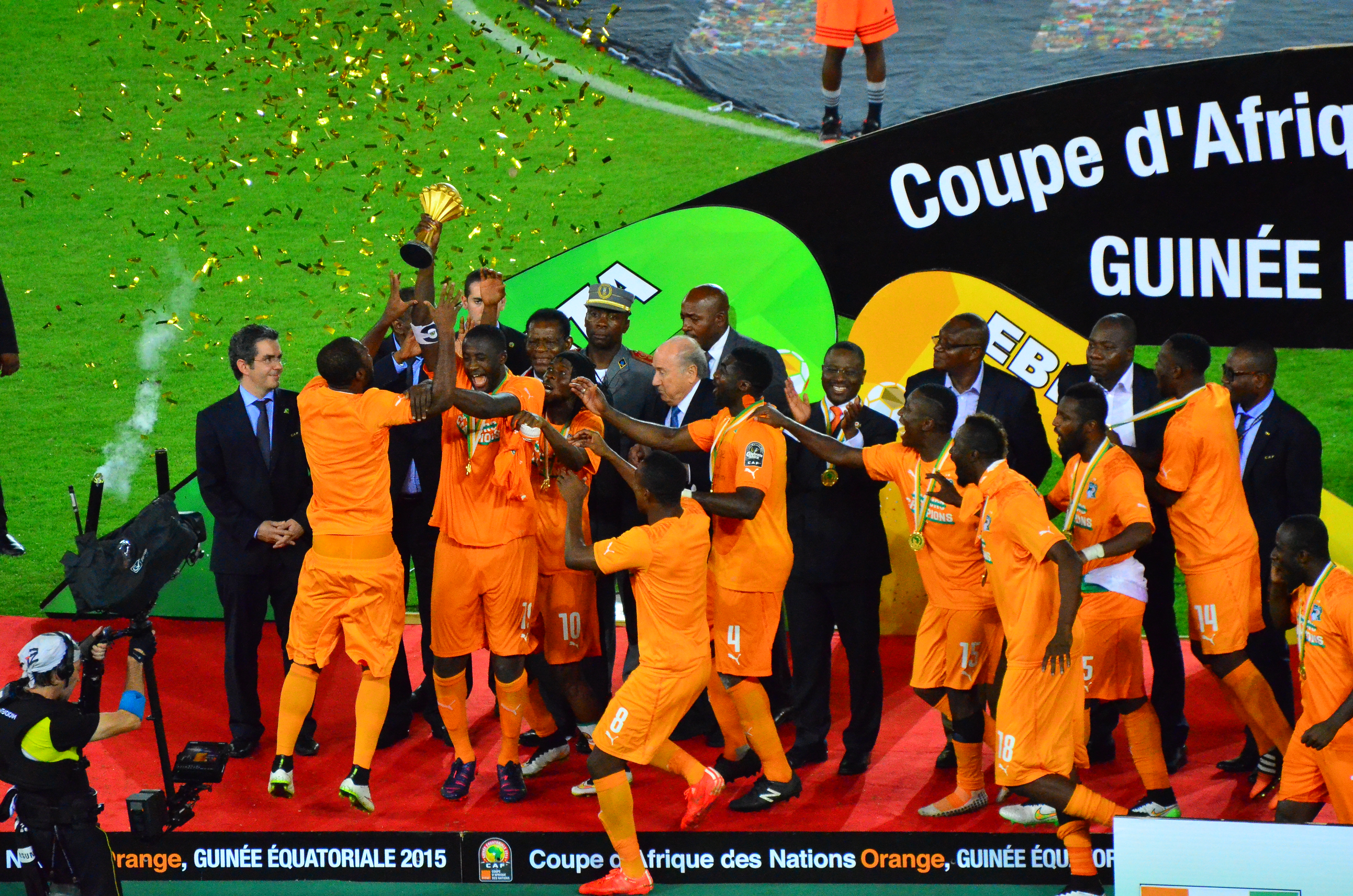
Ivory Coast players during the cup celebration.

In summarising the final, BBC Sport reporters noted that "defeat was perhaps a little harsh on Ghana, who had the better of the chances in the scoreless 120 minutes that preceded the shootout and twice hit the woodwork", while writers for France 24 wrote that "two hours of action delivered few chances as the tired-looking teams fought out an error-strewn midfield battle, although Ghana’s Christian Atsu came close to scoring with a snapshot that hit the post". Acquah was named as the man of the match, while Bony was awarded the Fair Player of the Match title. Atsu was named as the player of the tournament.

Ivory Coast manager Hervé Renard, who had also won the 2012 tournament with Zambia, later praised the Ivorian team, saying "... our relationship was strong and I put my trust in them. With this combination, you can achieve success, regardless of the obstacles you face." Speaking about the penalty shoot-out, Renard said "We missed the first two, but I knew it wasn’t over yet; the players wanted to do the impossible and win the title after twice being runners-up." Despite Ghana's defeat, his opposite number Avram Grant was upbeat: "I am proud of what happened here as no-one rated Ghana before the competition. But we came here to play some exciting football and showed some good things. [The players] have made me happy and after the final I told them so." Ivory Coast's Yaya Touré attributed the success to Renard: "Without the manager we would have won nothing. He made things difficult for me. He told me if I didn't run he'd kick me out. He's fantastic."

Ivory Coast's win elevated them above Tunisia into second place among African nations in the FIFA World Rankings, behind Algeria, while Ghana overtook both Tunisia and Senegal to occupy third place. After returning home, the Ivory Coast players took part in a victory parade in the country's commercial capital Abidjan on 9 February 2015. They failed to defend the Africa Cup of Nations at the next tournament in 2017, being eliminated in the group stage. Ghana progressed to the semi-final in that tournament, where they were beaten by eventual winners Cameroon.

== See also ==
- 2015 Africa Cup of Nations knockout stage
