= Cameroonian Football Federation =

Governing body of football in Cameroon

CAF
- Founded: 1959
- Headquarters: Yaoundé
- FIFA affiliation: 1964
- CAF affiliation: 1963
- President: Samuel Eto'o
- Website: fecafoot-officiel.com

The Cameroonian Football Federation (French: Fédération Camerounaise de Football) is the governing body of football league in Cameroon. It is known as FECAFOOT.

On 11 December 2021, the acting-president of FECAFOOT, former Cameroonian international striker Samuel Eto'o, was in controversial fashion, elected president of the organisation.

== History ==
It was after the First World War that the first football teams were established in Douala by the teacher Charles Lalanne. Soon, his example was followed in Yaoundé and the major centres of South Cameroon.

Around 1947 was founded by physician-colonel Baudiment "La Fédération des Sports", who organized and regulated sports in force at that time, particularly football. Leagues were formed; at the same time contacts were made with the Metropolis. Thus, on 26 February 1955 the amateur France team came to Douala and Yaoundé for two meetings. At that time, football was undergoing a great evolution. In all the more remote parts of the Territory, small clubs were taking shape and applying for membership in the League, which was chaired by Mr. Juillard.

The first extraordinary general meeting of FECAFOOT was held on 11 January 1959 in Yaoundé. The Cameroon Football League was dissolved; it was the birth of the Cameroonian Football Federation that was under the direct control of the deputy prime minister responsible for education. The first president of FECAFOOT was Ngankou Amos. The federation was affiliated with the CAF in 1963 and FIFA in 1964 (provisionally affiliated in 1962).

In 1961 a new president, Mr. Ibrahim Mbombo Njoya was elected, who would remain in office until 1964.

The first edition of the African Champions Club Cup was won by Cameroonian team Oryx Douala who beat Stade Malien of Mali 2–1 in a one-off final.

From 1964 to 1968, the First Division championship was played with 12 to 16 teams.

In 1968 René Essomba was elected head of the federation. The national team participated in the 1970 African Cup of Nations final in Khartoum, Sudan. Cameroon obtained the organization of 1972 African Cup of Nations. The construction of two stages will then be set up (Douala and Yaoundé).

After 1972, Jean Zoa Amougou was appointed president until 1978 and replaced by Gottlieb Titti from 1978 to 1985. It is during this period that the national team will first participate in a World Cup final round in Spain and win its first African Cup trophy in 1984 in Cote d'Ivoire.

The next president is Peter Ntamackyana (1985-1986) and especially Issa Hayatou from 1986 to 1988 current president of the Confederation of African Football (CAF). Next are the appointments of Jean NJi Njikam (1988-1989), Albert Etotoke (1989-1990), Njikam Simon, Pascal Owona (1990-1993) and Maha Daher (1993-1996) to the presidency of the FECAFOOT Team in the 1990 World Cup, and the final qualifications will be punctuated.

Crest used until 2010

Following the 2022 FIFA World Cup, the federation faces many financial difficulties. The camerounweb.com site reports numerous unpaid bills and a proposal to split the salaries of some players in pairs.

Since Samuel Eto’o assumed leadership of FECAFOOT in December 2021, the federation has been consistently embroiled in controversies over governance, transparency, financial management, and internal conflict, leading many analysts, journalists, and football stakeholders to describe it as one of the most troubled and poorly managed football institutions in recent years.

== Record of the Cameroonian national team ==
=== Men ===
- World Cup
  - 8 participations: 1982, 1990, 1994 1998, 2002, 2010, 2014, 2022
  - Best result: Quarter Finals (1990)
- Africa Cup of Nations
  - 22 participations
  - Champions: 1984, 1988, 2000, 2002, 2017
  - 2nd place: 1986, 2008
  - 3rd place: 1972, 2021
  - 4th place: 1992
- Confederations Cup
  - 2 participations: 2000, 2003
  - 2nd place: 2003
- African Nations Championship
  - 5 participations
  - 4th place: 2020

== See also ==
- Cameroon national football team
- Cameroon women's national football team
