= Brimah Razak =

Ghanaian footballer (born 1987)

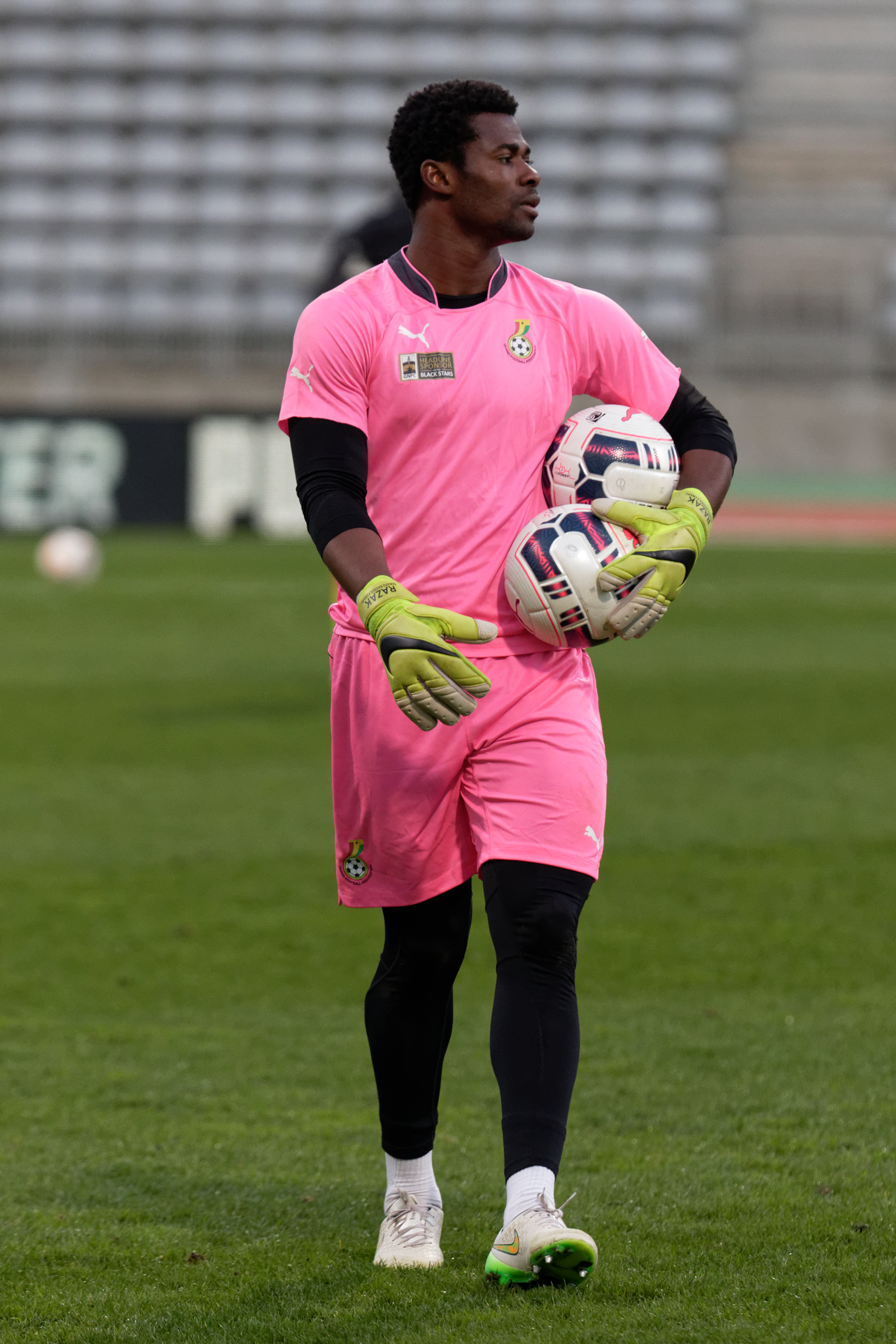
- Razak with Ghana in 2015

Personal information
- Date of birth: 22 June 1987 (age 39)
- Place of birth: Accra, Ghana
- Height: 1.91 m (6 ft 3 in)
- Position: Goalkeeper

Youth career
- 2004–2005: Wolfsburg
- 2005–2006: Poli Ejido
- 2006: Las Norias

Senior career*
Years	Team	Apps	(Gls)
2007	Chaves	7	(0)
2007–2008	União Madeira	30	(0)
2008–2009	Poli Ejido	6	(0)
2009–2011	Betis B	44	(0)
2010–2011	Betis	0	(0)
2011–2012	Tenerife	2	(0)
2012–2013	Guadalajara	25	(0)
2013–2014	Córdoba B	20	(0)
2014–2015	Mirandés	29	(0)
2015–2017	Córdoba	40	(0)
2017–2018	Mamelodi Sundowns	4	(0)
2019–2022	Linares Deportivo	64	(0)
2022–2024	Estepona	63	(0)
2024–2025	Calahorra	10	(0)
2025–2026	Torreperogil	22	(0)
Total		366	(0)

International career
2013–2017	Ghana	27	(0)
- * Club domestic league appearances and goals

Brimah Razak (born 22 June 1987) is a Ghanaian former professional footballer who played as a goalkeeper.

He spent most of his career in Spain, representing Guadalajara, Mirandés and Córdoba in the Segunda División. He also played professionally in Portugal and South Africa, winning the Premier Division with Mamelodi Sundowns.

Razak appeared in two Africa Cup of Nations editions with Ghana, having made his debut in 2013.

== Club career ==
=== Early career ===
After rarely settling as a youth player, Accra-born Razak started his professional career in January 2007 with Portugal's G.D. Chaves, playing in the country's Segunda Liga. The following year he moved down to the third division and joined Madeira's C.F. União, being first choice as they placed second their regional group – albeit without a final promotion.

=== Poli Ejido ===
In the summer of 2008, Razak returned to a club he had already represented as a youth, Polideportivo Ejido in Spain's Segunda División B. He backed up veteran Joaquín Valerio in a sole season.

=== Betis ===
Razak signed with Real Betis in 2009, but spent his first year in the same league as the previous campaign, as he appeared solely for the reserve side. He was promoted to the first team for 2010–11, with the Andalusians in the Segunda División.

Razak made his competitive debut on 1 September 2010, playing the full 90 minutes in a Copa del Rey game against UD Salamanca, a 2–1 home win.

=== Journeyman ===
Razak alternated between the second and third tier of Spanish football in the following years, representing CD Tenerife, CD Guadalajara, Córdoba CF B and CD Mirandés. On 29 July 2015 he returned to Córdoba, now being assigned to the main squad also in division two.

=== Mamelodi Sundowns ===
In August 2017, Razak moved to Mamelodi Sundowns FC; he signed a three-year contract as a free agent, stating in an interview that his reason for joining was because the club was the best in the South African Premier Division and in Africa. He made his debut on 11 September, in a 2–1 away victory over Free State Stars FC. In his only season, he acted as backup to Denis Onyango for the champions.

Razak parted ways with the Sundowns in August 2018 by mutual consent, citing a lack of playing time.

=== Linares Deportivo ===
Razak joined Linares Deportivo of the Spanish Tercera División in July 2019, on a one-year deal. He helped the team to gain promotion in his debut campaign with 75 points, 27 more than their closest challengers CD El Ejido after 29 matches before the season was truncated due to the COVID-19 pandemic. and the player was voted as the best goalkeeper after he conceded 13 goals in 25 appearances.

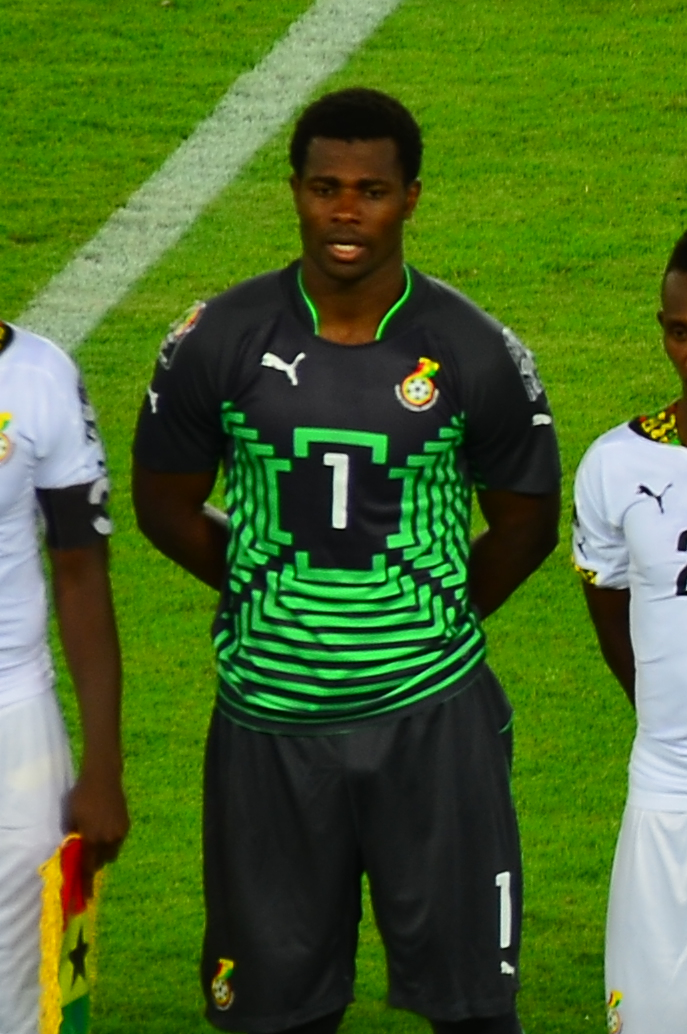
Razak before the 2015 Africa Cup of Nations final

In August 2020, Razak extended his contract with the club by another year. In 2020–21, he helped the side reach the promotion play-offs for the first time in 13 years; they lost at that stage, but were promoted to the newly formed Primera División RFEF. He was selected for the Team of the Season and voted best goalkeeper, having kept 15 clean sheets.

== International career ==
Razak earned the first of his 27 caps for Ghana on 14 August 2013, appearing in a 2–2 friendly draw in Turkey as a 46th-minute substitute. He was part of the squad that appeared in the 2015 Africa Cup of Nations, being first choice as the nation reached the final; in the decisive match, against the Ivory Coast, he missed his penalty shootout attempt in an eventual 9–8 loss.

Razak also started in the 2017 edition, a fourth-place finish in Gabon. Following criticism of his performances, he posted a video on Facebook that was perceived as disrespectful towards his compatriots, and was handed a $2,500 fine by the Ghana Football Association.

== Personal life ==
Razak fathered son Nasser and daughter Atu, referring to them as being his ''biggest idols and his life''. He idolised Ghanaian international goalkeeper Sammy Adjei, who won many laurels whilst playing for Accra Hearts of Oak S.C. and was also remembered for the 1999 FIFA World Youth Championship quarter-final tie against Spain.

On 28 June 2023, Razak married his longtime girlfriend (also the mother of his children) in Spain.

== Career statistics ==
=== International ===
Ghana
Year	Apps	Goals
2013	1	0
2014	2	0
2015	13	0
2016	6	0
2017	5	0
Total	27	0

== Honours ==
Mamelodi Sundowns

- South African Premier Division: 2017–18

Linares Deportivo

- Tercera División: 2019–20

Ghana

- Africa Cup of Nations runner-up: 2015

Individual

- Segunda División B Best Goalkeeper: 2020–21
- Segunda División B Team of the season: 2020–21
- Tercera División Best Goalkeeper: 2019–20
