= Bernard Kusi =

Ghanaian footballer

Personal information
- Date of birth: 1 June 1939 (age 87)
- Place of birth: Kumasi, Ghana
- Position: Defender

International career
Years	Team	Apps	(Gls)
- Ghana

Bernard Kusi (born 1 June 1939) is a Ghanaian former footballer. He competed in the men's tournament at the 1968 Summer Olympics.
