= Amosa Gbadamosi =

Ghanaian footballer

Personal information
- Date of birth: 15 April 1942 (age 84)
- Place of birth: Tamale, Ghana
- Position: Midfielder

International career
Years	Team	Apps	(Gls)
- Ghana

Amosa Gbadamosi (born 15 April 1942) is a Ghanaian former footballer. He competed in the men's tournament at the 1968 Summer Olympics.
