= Robert Mensah =

Ghanaian footballer (1939–1971)

- Mensah in 1970

Personal information
- Date of birth: 12 June 1939
- Place of birth: Gold Coast
- Date of death: 2 November 1971 (aged 32)
- Place of death: Tema, Ghana
- Position: Goalkeeper

Senior career*
Years	Team	Apps	(Gls)
1957–1962	Mysterious Dwarfs	150	(0)
1962–1964	Sekondi Independence Club	100	(0)
1964–1967	Asante Kotoko	50	(0)
1967–1971	Tema Textiles Printing	40	(0)
1971	Asante Kotoko		
Total		340	(0)

International career
1962—1971	Ghana	38	(0)
- * Club domestic league appearances and goals

Robert Mensah (12 June 1939 – 2 November 1971) was a Ghanaian footballer who played as a goalkeeper. As a player, he was best known for his exploits at Asante Kotoko where he won the African Clubs Cup in 1970. He was also a runner-up with the Ghana squad for the 1968 African Cup of Nations and represented Ghana at the 1968 Summer Olympics.

== Career ==
Mensah played in the 1967 Africa Clubs Cup final which resulted in a 3–3 draw and a replay was scheduled, however the Ghana Football Association never informed Asante Kotoko. As a result, Asante Kotoko did not participate in the replay and the trophy was awarded to Zaire's TP Engelbert in their absence.

Mensah was largely controversial in Ghanaian football and would mock opposition players by reading a newspaper whilst goal-tending. He often wore a cap during football games causing some opposing players to physically remove it from his head believing it was bringing them bad luck through the use of juju. This cap also earned him the nickname "Yashin", in homage to the Russian keeper named Lev Yashin, who also sported a cap during games.

In 1970, he was voted as the 9th best African football player by French football publication France-Football. A year later he was runner-up in the African football player of the year award.

During a qualifying game against the Liberia national team in April 1970, the player had missiles thrown at him by the home crowd.

In June the same year, his club side Tema Textiles Printing sacked him for not showing up for training. The player was training with the international team as they were playing against the Ivory Coast in a friendly.

His final game for Ghana would unknowingly come on 28 October 1971, when Ghana were knocked out 1–0 on aggregate by Togo.

== Death and legacy ==
Mensah was murdered in 1971 following Ghana's unsuccessful qualifying campaign for the 1972 African Cup of Nations. The player was stabbed with a broken bottle after an altercation in an akpeteshie bar Credo, Tema (Community 7), and died days later in Tema General Hospital at 02:30am on 2 November 1971. Three men were arrested by the Ghanaian police authorities following the death. Isaac Melfah, a 31-year-old Electrician, was reported to have been the perpetrator.

A sports stadium in Cape Coast has been named in his honour. The stadium is the home venue of the Mysterious Dwarfs, the team which Mensah began his football career with. He is also the subject of a folk song. In 1972, a song was released called "Robert Mensah" condemning drinking.

International teammate Ibrahim Sunday said that Mensah's lack of discipline was a reason for his death: "Robert was a great goalkeeper but at the same time he was a troublesome player who was not very disciplined but played very well in goal. It was his lack of discipline that caused his death..."
