= Rigoberto Guzmán =

Salvadoran footballer and manager (1932–2014)

Personal information
- Full name: Rigoberto Guzmán Calderón
- Date of birth: 11 June 1932
- Place of birth: Atiquizaya, Ahuachapán, El Salvador
- Date of death: 22 June 2014 (aged 82)
- Place of death: El Salvador
- Position: Midfielder

Senior career*
Years	Team	Apps	(Gls)
- Santa Anita
- Juventud Olimpica Metalio

International career
- El Salvador

Managerial career
- 1968: El Salvador
- Atlante San Alejo
- Adler San Nicolás
- Atlético Marte
- Cojutepeque
- Sonsonate
- Lincoln
- Maestranza
- * Club domestic league appearances and goals

Rigoberto "Rigo" Guzmán Calderón (11 June 1932 – 22 June 2014) was a Salvadoran football (soccer) player and manager from Atiquizaya.

== Club career ==
Guzmán was a running athlete who competed at the 800 and 3000 metres but later became a football player and captained the Juventud Olimpica Metalio side for eight years.

== Managerial career and other professions ==
Guzmán coached El Salvador at the 1968 Olympic Games. Also, he is a painter and caricaturist and in 2006 he was given the title Maestro Meritísimo de El Salvador after 50 years of educating.

In January 2001, Professor Guzmán fell victim of an earthquake when his house collapsed.

== Death ==
Guzmán died from an undisclosed terminal disease on 22 June 2014.
