= Joseph Wilson (footballer) =

Ghanaian footballer

Personal information
- Date of birth: 2 December 1939 (age 86)
- Place of birth: Cape Coast, Ghana
- Position: Midfielder

International career
Years	Team	Apps	(Gls)
- Ghana

Joseph Wilson (born 2 December 1939) is a Ghanaian footballer. He competed in the men's tournament at the 1968 Summer Olympics.
