= Zalagyömörő =

Coordinates: 47°1′4″N 17°13′34″E

- Location of Veszprém county in Hungary
- Country: Hungary
- County: Veszprém

Area
  - Total: 11.11 km^{2} (4.29 sq mi)

Population (2004)
  - Total: 482
  - Density: 43.38/km^{2} (112.4/sq mi)
- Time zone: UTC+1 (CET)
  - Summer (DST): UTC+2 (CEST)
- Postal code: 8349
- Area code: 87

Zalagyömörő is a village in Veszprém county, Hungary.
