= José Manuel Angel =

Salvadoran footballer (born 1948)

Personal information
- Date of birth: 24 August 1948 (age 78)
- Place of birth: Ilobasco, El Salvador
- Position: Midfielder

Senior career*
Years	Team	Apps	(Gls)
- Alianza F.C.

International career
- El Salvador
- * Club domestic league appearances and goals

José Manuel Angel (born 24 August 1948) is a Salvadoran former footballer. He competed in the men's tournament at the 1968 Summer Olympics.
