= Alex Mingle =

Ghanaian footballer

Personal information
- Date of birth: 1948 (age 77–78)
- Position: Defender

International career
| Years | Team | Apps | (Gls) |
- Ghana

Alex Mingle (born 1948) is a Ghanaian footballer. He competed in the men's tournament at the 1972 Summer Olympics.
