= Jonathan Kpakpo =

Ghanaian footballer

Personal information
- Date of birth: 25 December 1942
- Place of birth: Accra, Ghana
- Date of death: 8 April 2020 (aged 77)
- Position: Midfielder

International career
| Years | Team | Apps | (Gls) |
- Ghana

Jonathan Kpakpo (25 December 1942 – 8 April 2020) was a Ghanaian footballer. He competed in the men's tournament at the 1968 Summer Olympics.
