= George Alhassan (footballer, born 1941) =

Ghanaian footballer

Personal information
- Date of birth: 9 September 1941
- Place of birth: Kumasi, Ghana
- Date of death: 26 July 2013 (aged 71)
- Position: Forward

Senior career*
Years	Team	Apps	(Gls)
- Hearts of Oak

International career
- Ghana
- * Club domestic league appearances and goals

George Alhassan (9 September 1941 – 26 July 2013) was a Ghanaian football player. During his playing days he featured for Accra Hearts of Oak between the 1960s to 1970's.

The player participated at the 1968 Olympics in a game against Israel. and a year later he played for Ghana on 10 May 1969 in a 1970 World Cup qualification game. He died on 26 July 2013.
