= Shmuel Malika-Aharon =

Israeli footballer (1947–2011)

Shmuel Malika-Aharon שמואל מליקה-אהרון
Personal information
- Date of birth: 1 January 1947
- Place of birth: Tel Aviv, Israel
- Date of death: 16 August 2011 (aged 64)
- Position: Goalkeeper

International career
Years	Team	Apps	(Gls)
- Israel

Shmuel Malika-Aharon (Hebrew: שמואל מליקה-אהרון; 1 January 1947 – 16 August 2011) was an Israeli footballer. He competed in the men's tournament at the 1968 Summer Olympics.
