= Ferenc Csanádi =

Hungarian football manager (1925–1985)

Personal information
- Date of birth: 25 March 1925
- Place of birth: Pestszenterzsébet, Budapest, Hungary
- Date of death: 7 September 1985 (aged 60)
- Place of death: Budapest, Hungary

Managerial career
- Years: Team
- 1959-1961: Guinea
- 1967-1968: DR Congo
- 1970-1973: Ferencváros
Medal record
Men's Football
Representing Congo-Kinshasa (as manager)
Africa Cup of Nations
Winner	1968 Ethiopia

Ferenc Csanádi (26 March 1925 – 7 September 1985) was a Hungarian football manager who managed Ferencváros. Besides Hungary, he managed in Guinea and DR Congo.

== Career ==
In 1967, Csanádi was appointed as manager of DR Congo. He helped them win the 1968 African Cup of Nations.

== Honours ==
=== Manager ===
Congo-Kinshasa

- African Cup of Nations: 1968
