= Itzhak Drucker =

Israeli footballer

Itzhak Drucker יצחק דרוקר
Personal information
- Date of birth: 3 June 1947 (age 79)
- Place of birth: Germany
- Position: Defender

Youth career
- 1955–1966: Hapoel Petah Tikva

Senior career*
Years	Team	Apps	(Gls)
1966–1971	Hapoel Petah Tikva		
1971–1974	Shimshon Tel Aviv		
1974–1979	Maccabi Petah Tikva		
1979	Hapoel Kfar Saba		

International career
1968	Israel U-19		
1968–1970	Israel		
- * Club domestic league appearances and goals

Itzhak Drucker (Hebrew: יצחק דרוקר; born June 3, 1947) is a former Israeli football defender, who played for Israel national football team between 1966 and 1970. He took part in the 1968 Summer Olympics.

== Biography ==
Drucker was born in Germany, but his parents immigrated to Israel in 1948. Aged eight, Drucker started his career with Hapoel Petah Tikva's junior club, and aged 17 he became as a player at the senior team. After six seasons at the club he left and moved to Shimshon Tel Aviv F.C. There he played for three years, then he played for Maccabi Petah Tikva F.C. for five years and then he became a member of Hapoel Kfar Saba F.C. for a season.

== International career ==
Drucker made his international debut for Israel national under-19 football team in 1966. However, following his major score during that season, Milovan Ćirić, Israel's senior team manager, decided to add him into the senior squad. He took part in international games (1968 Summer Olympics and 1968 AFC Asian Cup,), but he did not take part in the 1970 FIFA World Cup. Drucker made 18 appearances for the Israel national football team since 1968 until he was expelled in 1970.
