= Sammy Sampene =

Ghanaian footballer

Personal information
- Date of birth: 18 December 1942 (age 83)
- Place of birth: Kumasi, Ghana
- Position: Forward

International career
Years	Team	Apps	(Gls)
- Ghana

Sammy Sampene (born 18 December 1942) is a Ghanaian former footballer. He competed in the men's tournament at the 1968 Summer Olympics.
