= Robert Foley (footballer) =

Ghanaian footballer

Personal information
- Date of birth: 7 June 1946 (age 80)
- Place of birth: Sekondi, Ghana
- Position: Forward

International career
Years	Team	Apps	(Gls)
- Ghana

Robert Foley (born 7 June 1946) is a Ghanaian former footballer. He competed in the men's tournament at the 1968 Summer Olympics.
