= Károly Fatér =

Hungarian footballer (1940–2020)

Personal information
- Date of birth: 9 April 1940
- Place of birth: Nyírlak, Hungary
- Date of death: 19 September 2020 (aged 80)
- Place of death: Budapest
- Position: Goalkeeper

International career
Years	Team	Apps	(Gls)
1968	Hungary	1	(0)
Medal record
Representing Hungary
Men's football
Gold medal – first place	1968 Mexico	Team

Károly Fatér (9 April 1940 – 19 September 2020) was a Hungarian footballer. He was born in Veszprém County. He competed at the 1968 Summer Olympics in Mexico City, where he won a gold medal with the Hungarian team.
