= Karl-Heinz Marotzke =

German football manager (1934–2022)

Personal information
- Date of birth: 29 March 1934
- Place of birth: Stettin, Germany
- Date of death: 28 July 2022 (aged 88)

Managerial career
- Years: Team
- 1963–1964: SF Hamborn 07
- 1964–1966: VfL Osnabrück
- 1967: Schalke 04
- 1968–1970: Ghana
- 1970–1972: Nigeria
- 1973–1974: Nigeria
- 2001: Botswana

Karl-Heinz Marotzke (29 March 1934 – 28 July 2022) was a German football coach.

He managed 1963–1964 SF Hamborn 07 leading the club to 14th place in the second division Regionalliga. From 1964 to 1966 he led VfL Osnabrück to 10th and 7th places in the second division. In the 1966–67 season he coached Eredivisie club Fortuna '54 finishing 14th. His appointment in 1967 with German first division Bundesliga club FC Schalke 04 was largely considered surprising ("inexperienced"). Early November, after 13 matchdays with a balance of nine defeats, three draws and only one win the club was on last position and he was let go. The club retained its spot in the league under his successor Günter Brocker.

From 1968 to 1970 he coached Ghana, which he led through the football tournament of the 1968 Olympics in Mexico, exiting there after the opening group phase with two draws and one defeat. After this he had appointments from 1970 to 1971 and 1974 with Nigeria and in 2001 with Botswana.
