= Jon Bortey Noawy =

Ghanaian footballer (born 1939)

Personal information
- Date of birth: 13 June 1939 (age 87)
- Place of birth: Koforidua, Ghana
- Position: Goalkeeper

International career
Years	Team	Apps	(Gls)
- Ghana

Jon Bortey Noawy (born 13 June 1939) is a Ghanaian former footballer. He competed in the men's tournament at the 1968 Summer Olympics.
