= István Básti =

Hungarian footballer

Personal information
- Born: 19 September 1944 (age 81) Salgótarján, Nógrád County, Hungary
Medal record
Representing Hungary
Men's football
Gold medal – first place	1968 Mexico	Team
Silver medal – second place	1972 West Germany	Team

István Básti (born 19 September 1944 in Salgótarján) is a Hungarian footballer. He was born in Salgótarján in Nógrád County. He competed at the 1968 Summer Olympics in Mexico City, where he won a gold medal with the Hungarian team.

After retiring, he worked as a dental technician.
