= István Juhász (footballer) =

Hungarian footballer (1945–2024)

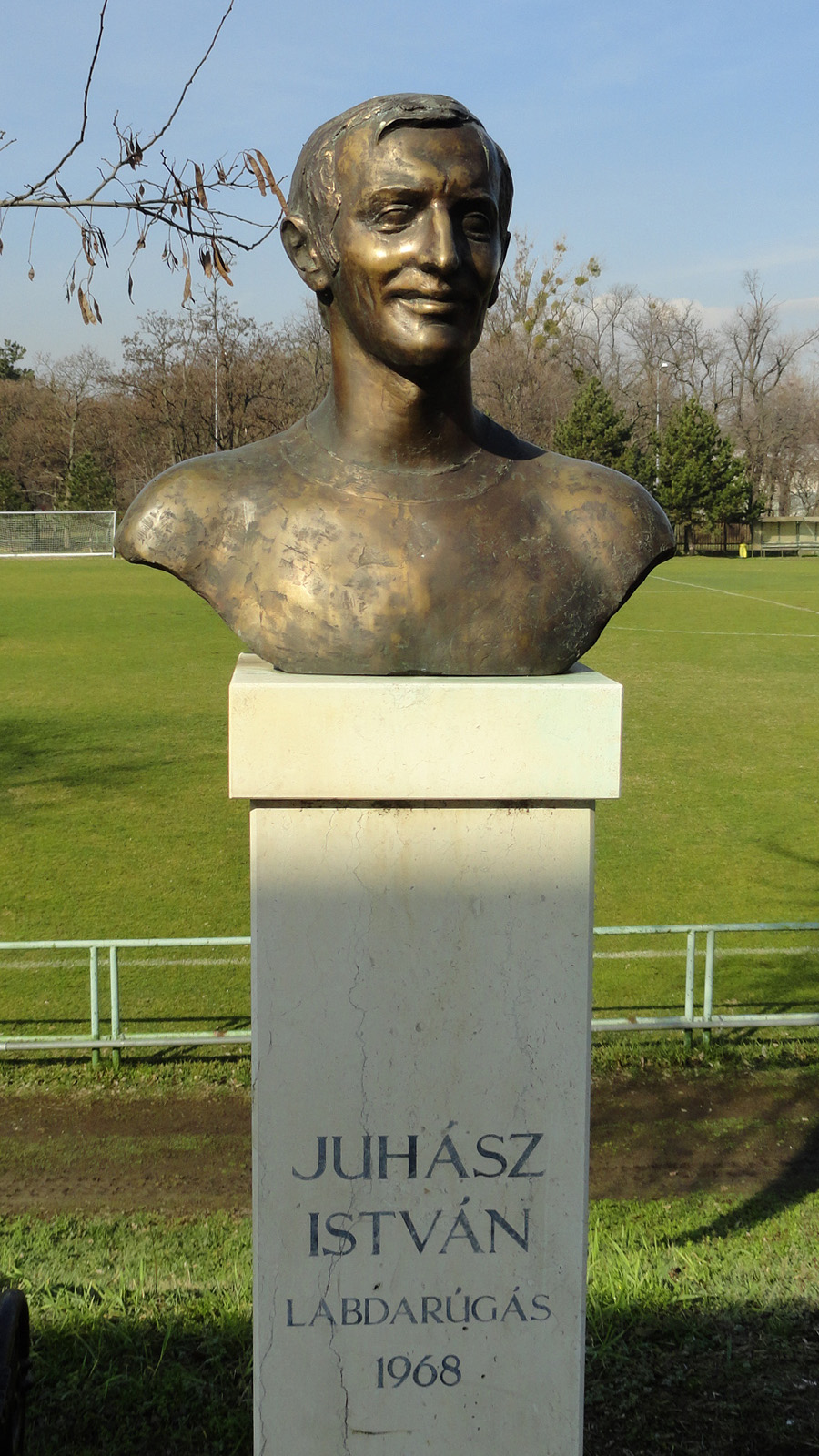
- 1999 bronze bust depicting Juhász

Personal information
- Date of birth: 17 July 1945
- Place of birth: Budapest, Hungary
- Date of death: September 2024 (aged 79)
- Place of death: Budapest, Hungary
- Height: 1.80 m (5 ft 11 in)
- Position: Midfielder

Senior career*
Years	Team	Apps	(Gls)
1963–1976	Ferencváros		
1976	San Diego Jaws		
1978–1979	San Diego Sockers		

International career
1969–1974	Hungary	23	(1)
Medal record
Representing Hungary
Men's football
Gold medal – first place	1968 Mexico City	Team competition
- * Club domestic league appearances and goals

István Juhász (17 July 1945 – 16 September 2024) was a Hungarian football midfielder, who played for Ferencváros.

Juhász won a gold medal in football at the 1968 Summer Olympics and also participated in UEFA Euro 1972 for the Hungary national team.

Following the end of his career, Juhász went to live in the United States for several decades, but later resettled in Hungary. He died on 16 September 2024, at the age of 79.

== Sources ==
- Ki kicsoda a magyar sportéletben?, II. kötet (I–R). Szekszárd, Babits Kiadó, 1995, 41. o., ISBN 963-495-011-6 (in Hungarian)
- Rejtő László–Lukács László–Szepesi György: Felejthetetlen 90 percek (Sportkiadó, 1977) ISBN 963-253-501-4 (in Hungarian)
- Dénes Tamás – Rochy Zoltán: A Kupagyőztesek Európa-kupája története (Budapest, 2000) ISBN 963-85967-3-2 (in Hungarian)
- Bocsák Miklós: Hogyan élnek olimpiai bajnokaink? (Budapest, 1998) (in Hungarian)
- Rózsaligeti László: Magyar olimpiai lexikon. Budapest: Datus. 2000. ISBN 963-00-5577-5 (in Hungarian)
- ftc.hu: A VVK hősei (in Hungarian) – Interview with Juhász (in Hungarian)
- vernarancsfoci.hu: European Cup finals (in Hungarian)
- ftcbk.eu: Ferencváros in European Cup Finals (in Hungarian)
- Az FTC örökös bajnokai (in Hungarian)
