= Zoltán Szarka =

Hungarian footballer

Personal information
- Born: 12 August 1942 Csorna
- Died: 18 April 2016 (aged 73)
Medal record
Representing Hungary
Men's football
Gold medal – first place	1968 Mexico	Team

Zoltán Szarka (12 August 1942 in Csorna – 18 April 2016) was a Hungarian footballer. He was born in Csorna. He competed at the 1968 Summer Olympics in Mexico City, where he won a gold medal with the Hungarian team.
