= Miklós Szalay =

Hungarian footballer

Personal information
- Date of birth: 6 December 1946 (age 79)
- Place of birth: Salgótarján, Hungary
- Height: 1.76 m (5 ft 9 in)
- Position: Midfielder

Senior career*
| Years | Team | Apps | (Gls) |
| 1964–1974 | Salgótarjáni BTC | 194 | (29) |

International career
| 1972 | Hungary | 1 | (0) |
Medal record
Representing Hungary
Men's football
| Gold medal – first place | 1968 Mexico | Team |
- * Club domestic league appearances and goals

Miklós Szalay (born 6 December 1946) is a Hungarian former footballer who played as a midfielder. He was born in Salgótarján, Nógrád County. He competed at the 1968 Summer Olympics in Mexico City, where he won a gold medal with the Hungarian team.
