= Malik Jabir =

Ghanaian footballer

Personal information
- Full name: Malik Jabir
- Date of birth: 8 December 1944 (age 81)
- Place of birth: Wa, Ghana
- Height: 1.68 m (5 ft 6 in)
- Position: Striker

Team information
- Current team: Asante Kotoko Sporting Club limited (Technical Director)

Senior career*
Years	Team	Apps	(Gls)
–	Asante Kotoko		

International career
–	Ghana		

Managerial career
- 2003: Ghana
- 2005–2006: Asante Kotoko
- 2007: ASFA Yennenga
- 2008–2009: Kano Pillars (Technical Adviser)
- * Club domestic league appearances and goals

Malik Jabir (born 8 December 1944) is a Ghanaian former professional footballer who played as a striker. He is currently a technical Director for Asante Kotoko S.C. in the Ghana Premier League.

== Career ==
Jabir played club football for Asante Kotoko.

== International career ==
Jabir also played for the Ghana national football team at the 1968 and 1972 Summer Olympics.

== Coaching career ==
Following his playing career, Jabir coached Ghana in 2003. He also coached Asante Kotoko, ASFA Yennenga of Burkina Faso and Kano Pillars F.C. of Nigeria as Technical Adviser.
