= Ernő Noskó =

Hungarian footballer

Personal information
- Date of birth: 26 May 1945 (age 81)
- Place of birth: Cserhátszentiván, Hungary
- Position: Midfielder

Senior career*
Years	Team	Apps	(Gls)
1964–1974	Újpest FC	246	(4)
1974–1978	Budafoki MTE		
1978–1982	Chinoin		

International career
1969–1971	Hungary	15	(0)
- * Club domestic league appearances and goals

Olympic medal record

Representing Hungary

Men's football
Gold medal – first place	1968 Mexico City	Team competition

Ernő Noskó (born 26 May 1945) was a Hungarian football player who played for Újpesti Dózsa. Noskó is most famous for his participation in the gold medal-winning Hungarian team on the 1968 Summer Olympics. He played 15 games for the Hungary national team.
