= Lajos Szűcs (footballer, born 1943) =

Hungarian footballer (1943–2020)

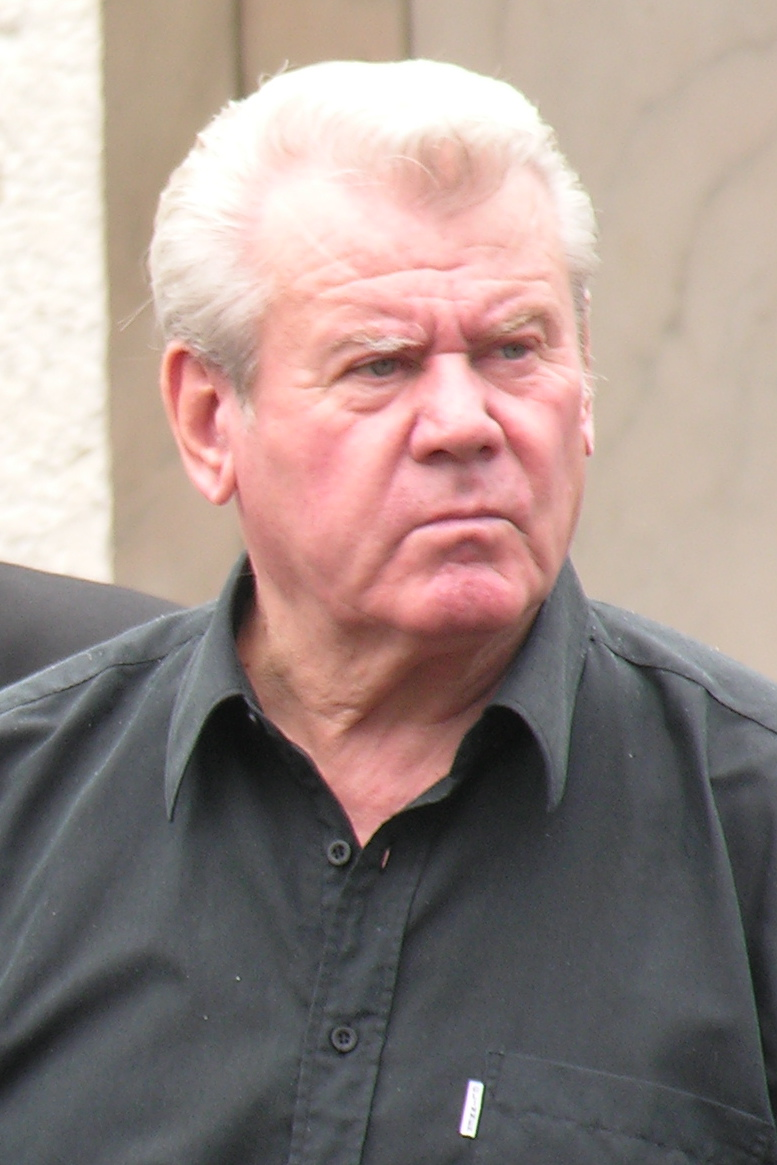

Personal information
- Date of birth: 10 December 1943
- Place of birth: Apatin, Kingdom of Hungary
- Date of death: 12 July 2020 (aged 76)
- Place of death: Budapest, Hungary
- Height: 1.79 m (5 ft 10 1/2 in)
- Position: Defender

Youth career
- 1957–1962: Újpesti Dózsa

Senior career*
Years	Team	Apps	(Gls)
1963–1966	Dorogi Bányász	61	(7)
1966–1969	Ferencváros	102	(7)
1971–1977	Honvéd	180	(18)
1977–1980	Vasas	34	(0)
1982	Hévíz FC		

International career
1967–1973	Hungary	37	(2)
Medal record
Representing Hungary
Men's football
Gold medal – first place	1968 Mexico City	Team competition
Silver medal – second place	1972 Munich	Team competition
- * Club domestic league appearances and goals

Lajos Szűcs (10 December 1943 – 12 July 2020) was a Hungarian football defender who played for Dorog, Ferencváros, Budapest Honvéd FC and Vasas Izzó.

He won a gold medal at the 1968 Summer Olympics and a silver medal at the 1972 Summer Olympics, and also participated in UEFA Euro 1972 for the Hungary national football team. He was named Hungarian Footballer of the Year in 1968 and 1971.

== Personal life ==
He was born in Apatin, Kingdom of Hungary (today in Serbia). He was married to Ildikó Pécsi, one of Hungary's best known and most popular actresses who also served as a Socialist member of the Hungarian Parliament from 1994 to 1998. He died on 12 July 2020 in Budapest at the age of 76.

== Sources ==
- Ki kicsoda a magyar sportéletben?, III. kötet (S–Z). Szekszárd, Babits Kiadó, 1995, 181. o., ISBN 963-495-014-0 (in Hungarian)
- Rejtő László–Lukács László–Szepesi György: Felejthetetlen 90 percek (Sportkiadó, 1977) ISBN 963-253-501-4 (in Hungarian)
- Rózsaligeti László: Magyar olimpiai lexikon. Budapest: Datus. 2000. ISBN 963-00-5577-5 (in Hungarian)
- Bocsák Miklós: Hogyan élnek olimpiai bajnokaink? (Budapest, 1998) (in Hungarian)
