= John Eshun =

Ghanaian footballer (1942–2018)

Personal information
- Full name: John Eshun
- Date of birth: 17 July 1942
- Place of birth: Sekondi, Ghana
- Date of death: 6 November 2018 (aged 76)
- Height: 1.60 m (5 ft 3 in)
- Position: Defender

Senior career*
Years	Team	Apps	(Gls)
?–?	Eleven Wise		
?–?	Hasaacas		

International career
1968–1972	Ghana U23	6	(0)
1968–1973	Ghana	28	(0)

Managerial career
- ?–?: Hasaacas
- 2006–2007: Tema Youth
- 2008: Ghana Women
- 2008–: Asfa Yenega
- 2010–2011: Ebusua Dwarfs
- 2011–2012: Berekum Arsenal
- * Club domestic league appearances and goals

John Eshun (17 July 1942 – 6 November 2018) was a Ghana international football defender.

== Career ==
Born in Sekondi, Eshun began playing club football for local sides Sekondi Eleven Wise F.C. and Sekondi Hasaacas F.C. Eshun represented Ghana at the 1968 Summer Olympics in Mexico City and the 1972 Summer Olympics in Munich. He also made several appearances for the senior Ghana national football team, including two FIFA World Cup qualifying matches, and he played at the 1968 and 1970 African Cup of Nations finals.

After Eshun retired from playing football, he became a coach. He managed Tema Youth, Ebusua Dwarfs. and Berekum Arsenal.
