= Lajos Dunai =

Hungarian footballer

Personal information
- Date of birth: 29 November 1942
- Place of birth: Budapest, Hungary
- Date of death: 18 December 2000 (aged 58)
- Place of death: Budapest, Hungary
- Position: Defender

Youth career
- 1953–1961: Csillaghegy

Senior career*
Years	Team	Apps	(Gls)
1961–1964	III. Kerületi TUE		
1964–1974	MTK Budapest		

International career
1966	Hungary	2	(0)
Medal record
Representing Hungary
Men's football
Gold medal – first place	1968 Mexico	Team
- * Club domestic league appearances and goals

Lajos Dunai (29 November 1942 – 18 December 2000) was a Hungarian footballer. He was born in Budapest. He competed at the 1968 Summer Olympics in Mexico City, where he won a gold medal with the Hungarian team.

He played for Csillaghegy, III. Kerületi TUE and MTK Budapest and for the Hungary national football team twice.
