= Iván Menczel =

Hungarian footballer

Personal information
- Date of birth: 14 December 1941
- Place of birth: Karancsalja, Hungary
- Date of death: 26 November 2011 (aged 69)
- Height: 1.78 m (5 ft 10 in)
- Position: Midfielder

Senior career*
Years	Team	Apps	(Gls)
1959–1963	Salgótarjáni BTC		

International career
1968	Hungary Olympic	7	(3)
- * Club domestic league appearances and goals

Olympic medal record

Representing Hungary

Men's football
Gold medal – first place	1968 Mexico City	Team

Iván Menczel (14 December 1941 – 26 November 2011) was a Hungarian football midfielder and Olympic champion. Menczel won the Olympic Games title in Mexico City in 1968, and in addition he was member of the Hungarian team which participated at the 1962 FIFA World Cup. He also played for Salgótarjáni BTC.
