= László Keglovich =

Hungarian footballer

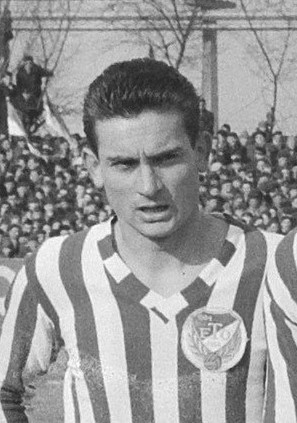
- Keglovich in 1965

Personal information
- Date of birth: 4 February 1940 (age 86)
- Place of birth: Sopron, Hungary
- Position: Defender

Senior career*
Years	Team	Apps	(Gls)
1957–1958	Soproni VSE		
1958–1973	Győri ETO FC		

International career
- Hungary (olympic)

Managerial career
- 1997: Győri ETO FC
Medal record
Representing Hungary
Men's football
Gold medal – first place	1968 Mexico	Team
- * Club domestic league appearances and goals

László Keglovich (Croatian: Ladislav Keglović, born 4 February 1940) is a Hungarian former football player and manager. He competed at the 1968 Summer Olympics in Mexico City, where he won a gold medal with the Hungarian team.
