= István Sárközi =

Hungarian footballer

Medal record

Men's football

Olympic Games
Gold medal – first place	1968	Team competition

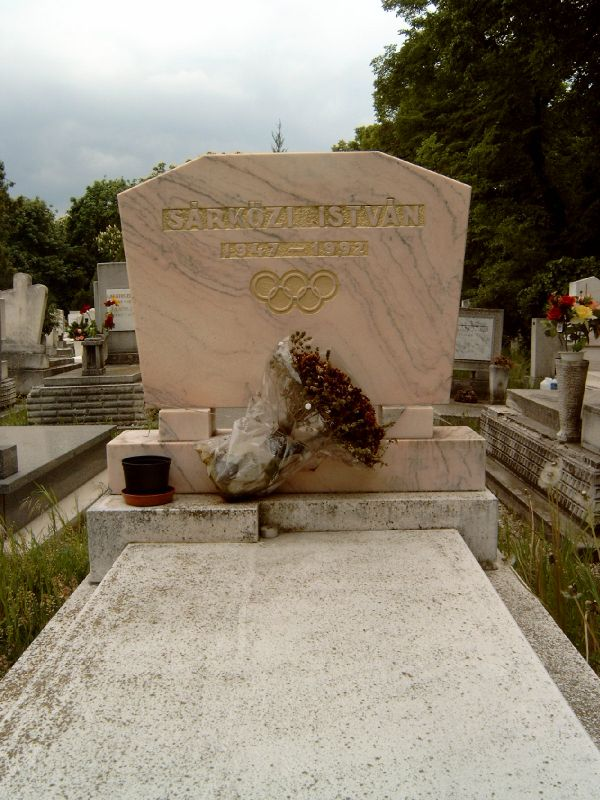
Tomb of Sárközi in Budapest

István Sárközi (21 October 1947 – 31 January 1992) was a Hungarian footballer.

He was born in Jászberény. He won a gold medal in the 1968 Olympic team competition. He died in January 1992 at only 44 years of age.
