= Ibrahim Sunday =

Ghanaian footballer and coach (born 1944)

Personal information
- Date of birth: 22 July 1944 (age 82)
- Place of birth: Koforidua, Ghana
- Height: 1.68 m (5 ft 6 in)
- Position: Winger

Senior career*
Years	Team	Apps	(Gls)
1966?–1975	Asante Kotoko		
1975–1977	Werder Bremen	1	(0)
1977–1980	VSK Osterholz-Scharmbeck		

International career
1968–1972	Ghana	25	(7)

Managerial career
- c. 1983: Asante Kotoko
- c. 1991: Africa Sports
- * Club domestic league appearances and goals

Ibrahim Sunday (born 22 July 1944) is a Ghanaian former professional football player and coach. A midfielder, he played the majority of his career for Ghanaian club Asante Kotoko, and was also a member of the Ghana national team, participating in two Africa Nations Cup tournaments. In 1971, he won the African Footballer of the Year award. He is the first ever African footballer to appear in the Bundesliga.

== Club career ==
Born in Koforidua, Eastern Region, Ghana, Sunday started his career playing for local club Kumasi Asante Kotoko, of which he became the captain. In 1970, he and his club won the African Cup of Champions, predecessor of the CAF Champions League, the first international title obtained by the club.

In 1975, Sunday moved to Werder Bremen in the Bundesliga, where in two seasons he barely had any playing time, appearing in only one league match against Rot-Weiß Essen on 6 June 1976. This, however, made him the first ever African footballer to appear in the Bundesliga.

== International career ==
Sunday was first named to the Ghana national team in 1966, and his first official international tournament was the 1968 African Cup of Nations, where he scored a goal against Laurent Pokou's Ivory Coast in the semifinal as Ghana won 4–3. The Black Stars lost the final to DR Congo.

At the 1970 Nations Cup, there was a rematch of the semifinal from two years before, Ghana again defeated the Ivorians winning 2–1, with Sunday scoring the opening goal. However, they lost in the final again, that time to hosts Sudan.

The 1970 final was Sunday's last Nations Cup match, as Ghana failed to qualify for the 1972, 1974, and 1976 continental tournaments. Ghana then qualified for the 1972 Olympic tournament in Munich, and Sunday was part of the Olympic squad.

== Coaching career ==
As a coach, Sunday managed his former club Asante Kotoko, leading them to their second African Cup of Champions victory in 1983. He also managed Abuakwa Susubiribi and Ashanti Goldfieds of Ghana, FC 105 Libreville of Gabon and Ivorian club Africa Sports of Abidjan, whom he also led to the continental title in 1992.

== Honours ==
=== Player ===
Asante Kotoko

- Ghana Premier League: 1963–64, 1964–65, 1967, 1968, 1969, 1972, 1975
- African Cup of Champions Clubs: 1970

Ghana

- African Cup of Nations runner up: 1968, 1970

Individual

- African Footballer of the Year: 1971

=== Manager ===
Asante Kotoko

- African Cup of Champions Clubs: 1983

Africa Sports d'Abidjan

- WAFU Club Championship: 1991
- African Cup Winners Cup: 1992
- CAF Super Cup: 1993

Individual

- CAF Legends award: 2017
