= Football at the 1964 Summer Olympics – Men's team squads =

The following squads were named for the 1964 Summer Olympics tournament.

== Argentina ==
Head coach: (Argentina) Ernesto Duchini

| No. | Pos. | Player | DoB | Age | Caps | Club | Tournament games | Tournament goals | Minutes played | Sub off | Sub on | Cards yellow/red |
|---|---|---|---|---|---|---|---|---|---|---|---|---|
| 1 | GK | Agustín Cejas | March 22, 1946 | 18 | ? | (Argentina) Racing Club |
| 2 | DF | Andrés Bertolotti | September 1, 1943 | 21 | ? | (Argentina) Chacarita Juniors |
| 3 | DF | Otto Sesana | July 16, 1943 | 21 | ? | (Argentina) Rosario Central |
| 4 | DF | Horacio Moráles | June 27, 1943 | 21 | ? | (Argentina) Atlanta |
| 5 | DF | Miguel Mori | May 17, 1943 | 21 | ? | (Argentina) Independiente |
| 6 | MF | Roberto Perfumo | October 3, 1942 | 22 | ? | (Argentina) Racing Club |
| 7 | MF | Ricardo Ramon Pérez | August 23, 1944 | 19 | ? | (Argentina) Argentinos Juniors |
| 8 | MF | José Malleo | January 29, 1944 | 20 | ? | (Argentina) Rosario Central |
| 9 | FW | Carlos Alberto Bulla | October 6, 1943 | 21 | ? | (Argentina) Rosario Central |
| 10 | FW | Néstor Manfredi | August 22, 1942 | 22 | ? | (Argentina) Rosario Central |
| 11 | FW | Héctor Ochoa | July 5, 1942 | 22 | ? | (Argentina) Atlanta |
| 12 | GK | José Miguel Marín | May 15, 1943 | 21 | ? | (Argentina) Vélez Sársfield |
| 13 | DF | Juan Carlos Sconfianza | July 13, 1943 | 21 | ? | (Argentina) San Lorenzo |
| 14 | DF | Emilio Pazos | July 24, 1945 | 19 | ? | (Argentina) Atlanta |
| 15 | MF | Francisco Esteban Brandán | May 8, 1940 | 24 | ? | (Argentina) All Boys |
| 16 | MF | Antonio Cabrera | October 17, 1943 | 20 | ? | (Argentina) Atlanta |
| 17 | MF | Juan Risso | September 3, 1942 | 22 | ? | (Argentina) Gimnasia y Esgrima LP |
| 18 | FW | Juan Carlos Domínguez | November 3, 1943 | 20 | ? | (Argentina) River Plate |
| 19 | FW | Miguel Tojo | July 9, 1943 | 21 | ? | (Argentina) Ferro Carril Oeste |

== Brazil ==
Head coach: Vicente Feola

| No. | Pos. | Player | DoB | Age | Caps | Club | Tournament games | Tournament goals | Minutes played | Sub off | Sub on | Cards yellow/red |
|---|---|---|---|---|---|---|---|---|---|---|---|---|
| 1 | GK | Florisvaldo | May 9, 1943 | 21 | ? | (Brazil) Botafogo |
| 2 | DF | Mura | February 4, 1944 | 20 | ? | (Brazil) Botafogo |
| 3 | DF | Zé Luiz | July 5, 1943 | 21 | ? | (Brazil) Fluminense |
| 4 | DF | Valdez | February 10, 1943 | 21 | ? | (Brazil) Fluminense |
| 5 | DF | Adevaldo | August 16, 1943 | 21 | ? | (Brazil) Botafogo |
| 6 | MF | Íris | February 12, 1942 | 22 | ? | (Brazil) Fluminense |
| 7 | MF | Roberto Miranda | July 31, 1944 | 20 | ? | (Brazil) Botafogo |
| 8 | FW | Zé Roberto | May 31, 1945 | 19 | ? | (Brazil) São Paulo |
| 9 | FW | Aladim | May 15, 1937 | 27 | ? | (Brazil) São Cristóvão |
| 10 | MF | Ivo Soares | December 16, 1938 | 25 | ? | (Brazil) Flamengo |
| 11 | FW | Caravetti | February 4, 1945 | 19 | ? | (Brazil) Palmeiras |
| 12 | GK | Hélio Dias | December 19, 1943 | 20 | ? | (Brazil) Botafogo |
| 13 | DF | Riva | May 4, 1944 | 20 | ? | (Brazil) Fluminense |
| 14 | DF | Dimas | May 13, 1944 | 20 | ? | (Brazil) Botafogo |
| 16 | FW | Humberto | June 20, 1945 | 19 | ? | (Brazil) Botafogo |
| 17 | FW | Mattar | November 24, 1944 | 19 | ? | (Brazil) Comercial |
| 18 | FW | Tito | March 15, 1943 | 21 | ? | (Brazil) Fluminense |
| 19 | MF | Elizeu | October 17, 1945 | 19 | ? | (Brazil) Santos |
| 20 | FW | Othon | December 18, 1943 | 20 | ? | (Brazil) Botafogo |
| 21 | FW | Nélio | December 8, 1943 | 20 | ? | (Brazil) Fluminense |

== Czechoslovakia ==
Head coach: Rudolf Vytlačil

| No. | Pos. | Player | DoB | Age | Caps | Club | Tournament games | Tournament goals | Minutes played | Sub off | Sub on | Cards yellow/red |
|---|---|---|---|---|---|---|---|---|---|---|---|---|
| 1 | GK | František Schmucker | January 28, 1940 | 24 | ? | (Czechoslovakia) Rudá Hvězda Brno |
| 2 | DF | Anton Urban | January 16, 1934 | 30 | ? | (Czechoslovakia) ŠK Slovan Bratislava |
| 3 | DF | Vladimír Weiss | September 21, 1939 | 25 | ? | (Czechoslovakia) FK Inter Bratislava |
| 4 | DF | Zdeněk Pičman | January 23, 1933 | 21 | ? | (Czechoslovakia) Spartak Hradec Králové |
| 5 | FW | Josef Vojta | April 19, 1935 | 19 | ? | (Czechoslovakia) Sparta Prague |
| 6 | MF | Ján Geleta | September 13, 1943 | 21 | ? | (Czechoslovakia) Dukla Prague |
| 7 | FW | Ľudovít Cvetler | September 17, 1938 | 26 | ? | (Czechoslovakia) ŠK Slovan Bratislava |
| 8 | FW | Ivan Mráz | May 24, 1941 | 23 | ? | (Czechoslovakia) Sparta Prague |
| 9 | FW | Karel Lichtnégl | August 30, 1936 | 28 | ? | (Czechoslovakia) Spartak ZJŠ Brno |
| 10 | FW | Vojtech Masný | July 8, 1938 | 26 | ? | (Czechoslovakia) Jednota Trenčín |
| 11 | FW | František Valošek | July 12, 1937 | 27 | ? | (Czechoslovakia) FC Baník Ostrava |
| 12 | MF | Karel Knesl | April 8, 1942 | 22 | ? | (Czechoslovakia) Dukla Prague |
| 13 | DF | Štefan Matlák | February 6, 1934 | 20 | ? | (Czechoslovakia) ŠK Slovan Bratislava |
| 14 | MF | Karel Nepomucký | July 20, 1939 | 25 | ? | (Czechoslovakia) SK Slavia Prague |
| 15 | MF | František Knebort | January 19, 1944 | 20 | ? | (Czechoslovakia) Bohemians ČKD Praha |
| 16 | FW | Jan Brumovský | June 26, 1937 | 27 | ? | (Czechoslovakia) Dukla Prague |
| 21 | GK | Anton Švajlen | December 3, 1937 | 27 | ? | (Czechoslovakia) VSS Košice |

== United Team of Germany ==
Head coach: (Hungary) Károly Sós

| No. | Pos. | Player | DoB | Age | Caps | Club | Tournament games | Tournament goals | Minutes played | Sub off | Sub on | Cards yellow/red |
|---|---|---|---|---|---|---|---|---|---|---|---|---|
| 1 | GK | Jürgen Heinsch | July 4, 1940 | 24 | ? | (East Germany) SC Empor Rostock |
| 2 | DF | Klaus Urbanczyk | June 4, 1940 | 24 | ? | (East Germany) SC Chemie Halle |
| 3 | DF | Manfred Walter | July 31, 1937 | 27 | ? | (East Germany) BSG Chemie Leipzig |
| 4 | DF | Manfred Geisler | March 3, 1941 | 23 | ? | (East Germany) SC Leipzig |
| 5 | MF | Klaus-Dieter Seehaus | October 6, 1942 | 22 | ? | (East Germany) SC Empor Rostock |
| 6 | MF | Werner Unger | May 4, 1931 | 33 | ? | (East Germany) ASK Vorwärts Berlin |
| 7 | MF | Herbert Pankau | October 4, 1941 | 23 | ? | (East Germany) SC Empor Rostock |
| 8 | DF | Peter Rock | December 16, 1941 | 22 | ? | (East Germany) SC Motor Jena |
| 9 | MF | Gerhard Körner | September 20, 1941 | 23 | ? | (East Germany) ASK Vorwärts Berlin |
| 10 | FW | Wolfgang Barthels | November 23, 1940 | 23 | ? | (East Germany) SC Empor Rostock |
| 11 | MF | Dieter Engelhardt | August 18, 1938 | 26 | ? | (East Germany) SC Leipzig |
| 12 | FW | Gerd Backhaus | September 8, 1942 | 22 | ? | (East Germany) BSG Lokomotive Stendal |
| 13 | FW | Bernd Bauchspieß | October 10, 1939 | 25 | ? | (East Germany) BSG Chemie Leipzig |
| 14 | FW | Henning Frenzel | May 3, 1942 | 22 | ? | (East Germany) SC Leipzig |
| 15 | DF | Otto Fräßdorf | February 3, 1942 | 22 | ? | (East Germany) ASK Vorwärts Berlin |
| 16 | MF | Jürgen Nöldner | February 22, 1941 | 23 | ? | (East Germany) ASK Vorwärts Berlin |
| 17 | MF | Klaus Lisiewicz | February 2, 1943 | 21 | ? | (East Germany) BSG Chemie Leipzig |
| 18 | FW | Eberhard Vogel | April 8, 1943 | 21 | ? | (East Germany) SC Karl-Marx-Stadt |
| 19 | FW | Hermann Stöcker | January 6, 1938 | 26 | ? | (East Germany) SC Aufbau Magdeburg |
| 20 | GK | Horst Weigang | September 20, 1940 | 24 | ? | (East Germany) SC Leipzig |

== United Arab Republic ==
Head coach: (Socialist Federal Republic of Yugoslavia) Josef Vandler

| No. | Pos. | Player | DoB | Age | Caps | Club | Tournament games | Tournament goals | Minutes played | Sub off | Sub on | Cards yellow/red |
|---|---|---|---|---|---|---|---|---|---|---|---|---|
| 1 | GK | Fathi Khorshid | December 11, 1937 | 26 | ? | (Egypt) Ghazl El Mahalla SC |
| 2 | GK | Reda Ahmed | November 9, 1939 | 24 | ? | (Egypt) El Ittihad Alexandria |
| 3 | FW | Moustafa Reyadh | April 5, 1941 | 23 | ? | (United Arab Republic) Tersana SC | | 8 |
| 4 | FW | Nabil Nosair | October 11, 1938 | 26 | ? | (Egypt) Zamalek SC |
| 5 | | Mohammed "Shehta" Seddiq | April 14, 1940 | 24 | ? | (United Arab Republic) Ismaily |
| 6 | | Khalil Mohamed Shahin | March 2, 1942 | 22 | ? | (United Arab Republic) Al-Masry SC |
| 7 | DF | Amin El-Esnawi | June 23, 1936 | 27 | ? | (United Arab Republic) Al-Ittihad Suez |
| 8 | DF | Ahmed Mostafa | March 8, 1940 | 24 | ? | (Egypt) Zamalek SC |
| 9 | DF | Mimi Darwish | March 20, 1942 | 22 | ? | (United Arab Republic) Ismaily |
| 10 | | Yaken Zaki | September 12, 1934 | 30 | ? | (Egypt) Zamalek SC |
| 11 | MF | Raafat Attia | February 6, 1934 | 30 | ? | (Egypt) Zamalek SC |
| 12 | MF | Rifaat El-Fanagily | May 1, 1936 | 28 | ? | (United Arab Republic) Al-Ahly |
| 13 | MF | Mahmoud Hassan | November 19, 1943 | 20 | ? | (United Arab Republic) Tersana SC |
| 14 | FW | Farouk Mahmoud | October 18, 1944 | 19 | ? | (Egypt) El-Olympi |
| 15 | DF | Mimi El-Sherbini | July 26, 1937 | 26 | ? | (United Arab Republic) Al-Ahly |
| 16 | FW | Taha Ismail | February 8, 1939 | 25 | ? | (United Arab Republic) Al-Ahly |
| 17 | MF | Samir Qotb | March 16, 1938 | 26 | ? | (United Arab Republic) Zamalek SC |
| 18 | | Ali Kamal Etman | June 6, 1941 | 23 | ? | (United Arab Republic) Al-Sekka Al-Hadid |
| 19 | FW | Badawi Abdel Fattah | May 24, 1935 | 29 | ? | (United Arab Republic) Tersana SC |
| 20 | | Sayed El-Tabbakh | November 3, 1940 | 23 | ? | (United Arab Republic) El Qanah FC |

== Ghana ==
Head coach: Charles Gyamfi

| No. | Pos. | Player | DoB | Age | Caps | Club | Tournament games | Tournament goals | Minutes played | Sub off | Sub on | Cards yellow/red |
|---|---|---|---|---|---|---|---|---|---|---|---|---|
| 1 | GK | Nii Dodoo Ankrah | March 8, 1934 | 30 | ? | (Ghana) Real Republicans |
| 2 | DF | Sam Acquah | | | ? | (Ghana) Eleven Wise |
| 3 | DF | Emmanuel Oblitey | | | ? | (Ghana) Real Republicans |
| 4 | DF | Ben Acheampong | February 2, 1939 | 25 | ? | (Ghana) Asante Kotoko SC |
| 5 | DF | Charles Addo Odametey | February 23, 1937 | 27 | ? | (Ghana) Accra Hearts of Oak SC |
| 6 | MF | Emmanuel Kwesi Nkansah | October 15, 1941 | 22 | ? |
| 7 | MF | Osei Kofi | June 3, 1942 | 22 | ? | (Ghana) Asante Kotoko SC |
| 8 | MF | Wilberforce Mfum | | | ? | (Ghana) Asante Kotoko SC |
| 9 | FW | Edward Aggrey-Fynn | | | ? | (Ghana) Accra Hearts of Oak SC |
| 10 | FW | Edward Acquah | | | ? | (Ghana) Eleven Wise |
| 11 | MF | Kofi Pare | November 28, 1938 | 25 | ? | (Ghana) Real Republicans |
| 12 | DF | Abdul Ramonu Gibirine | August 14, 1940 | 24 | ? |
| 13 | GK | Addoquaye Laryea | | | ? | (Ghana) Accra Hearts of Oak SC |
| 14 | MF | Kwame Atta | November 22, 1935 | 28 | ? | (Ghana) Brong Ahafo United |
| 15 | FW | Gladstone Ofori | October 8, 1943 | 21 | ? | (Ghana) Real Republicans |
| 16 | DF | Samuel Okai | June 6, 1936 | 28 | ? |
| 17 | FW | Gyau Agyemang | June 3, 1939 | 25 | ? | (Ghana) Real Republicans |
| 18 | FW | Mohammadu Salisu | | | ? | (Ghana) Asante Kotoko SC |
| 19 | GK | Kofi Anoi | September 21, 1942 | 22 | ? |
| 20 | FW | Frank Odoi | February 23, 1943 | 21 | ? | (Ghana) Great Olympics | 1 | 0 | 90 | - | - | - |
| 21 | FW | Joseph Adjei | November 3, 1935 | 28 | ? | (Ghana) Asante Kotoko SC |

== Hungary ==
Head coach: Károly Lakat

| No. | Pos. | Player | DoB | Age | Caps | Club | Tournament games | Tournament goals | Minutes played | Sub off | Sub on | Cards yellow/red |
|---|---|---|---|---|---|---|---|---|---|---|---|---|
| 1 | GK | Antal Szentmihályi | June 13, 1939 | 25 | ? | (Hungary) Vasas SC |
| 2 | FW | Tibor Csernai | December 3, 1938 | 25 | ? | (Hungary) Tatabánya |
| 3 | DF | Dezső Novák | February 3, 1939 | 25 | ? | (Hungary) Ferencvárosi TC |
| 4 | DF | Benő Káposzta | December 7, 1942 | 22 | ? | (Hungary) Újpest FC |
| 5 | | Árpád Orbán | March 14, 1938 | 26 | ? | (Hungary) Győri ETO FC |
| 6 | DF | Kálmán Ihász | March 6, 1941 | 23 | ? | (Hungary) Vasas SC |
| 7 | DF | Gusztáv Szepesi | July 17, 1939 | 25 | ? | (Hungary) Tatabánya |
| 8 | | Károly Palotai | September 11, 1935 | 29 | ? | (Hungary) Győri ETO FC |
| 9 | MF | István Nagy | April 14, 1939 | 25 | ? | (Hungary) MTK Hungária FC |
| 10 | | György Nagy | July 30, 1942 | 22 | ? | (Hungary) Budapest Honvéd |
| 11 | FW | Imre Komora | June 5, 1940 | 24 | ? | (Hungary) Budapest Honvéd |
| 12 | FW | Zoltán Varga | January 1, 1945 | 19 | ? | (Hungary) Ferencvárosi TC |
| 13 | FW | Ferenc Bene | December 17, 1944 | 19 | ? | (Hungary) Újpesti Dózsa | | 12 |
| 14 | FW | Antal Dunai | March 21, 1943 | 21 | ? | (Hungary) Pécsi Dózsa |
| 15 | FW | János Farkas | March 27, 1942 | 22 | ? | (Hungary) Vasas SC |
| 16 | | Sándor Katona | February 21, 1943 | 21 | ? | (Hungary) Budapest Honvéd |
| 17 | | Pál Orosz | January 25, 1934 | 30 | ? | (Hungary) Ferencvárosi TC |
| 18 | | Ferenc Nógrádi | November 15, 1940 | 23 | ? | (Hungary) Budapest Honvéd |
| 19 | GK | József Gelei | June 29, 1938 | 26 | ? | (Hungary) Tatabánya |

== Iran ==
Head coach: Hossein Fekri

| No. | Pos. | Player | DoB | Age | Caps | Club | Tournament games | Tournament goals | Minutes played | Sub off | Sub on | Cards yellow/red |
|---|---|---|---|---|---|---|---|---|---|---|---|---|
| 1 | GK | Aziz Asli | April 4, 1937 | 27 | ? | (Iran) Daraei F.C. |
| 2 | | Mansour Amir-Asefi | July 19, 1933 | 21 | ? | (Iran) Kian F.C. |
| 3 | | Ali Mirzaei | October 9, 1942 | 22 | ? |
| 4 | DF | Mostafa Arab | August 13, 1941 | 23 | ? | (Iran) Oghab F.C. |
| 5 | | Hassan Habibi | February 7, 1939 | 25 | ? | (Iran) Taj SC |
| 6 | | Ibrahim Latifi | January 27, 1939 | 25 | ? | (Iran) Shahin |
| 7 | | Abdullah Sayedi | August 24, 1942 | 22 | ? |
| 8 | | Kambozia Jamali | July 9, 1938 | 26 | ? | (Iran) Taj SC |
| 9 | MF | Jalal Talebi | March 23, 1942 | 22 | ? |
| 10 | | Gholam Hussain Nourian | March 16, 1935 | 29 | ? | (Iran) Daraei F.C. |
| 11 | | Hossein Khodaparast | May 27, 1938 | 26 | ? | (Iran) Taj Tabriz |
| 12 | | Karam Nayyerloo | March 19, 1943 | 21 | ? | (Iran) Taj SC |
| 13 | | Gholam Hossein Fanaei | May 14, 1942 | 22 | ? |
| 14 | | Fariborz Esmaeili | July 1, 1940 | 24 | ? | (Iran) Taj SC |
| 15 | | Dariush Mostafavi | September 8, 1944 | 20 | ? | (Iran) Taj SC |
| 16 | MF | Parviz Ghelichkhani | December 4, 1945 | 18 | ? | (Iran) Kian F.C. |
| 17 | GK | Mohammad Bayati | May 5, 1932 | 32 | ? | (Iran) Taj SC |

== Japan ==
Head coach: (West Germany) Dettmar Cramer

| # | Pos. | Player | Date of birth | Age | Caps | Club | Tournament games | Tournament goals | Minutes played | Sub off | Sub on | Cards yellow/red |
|---|---|---|---|---|---|---|---|---|---|---|---|---|
| 1 | GK | Tsukasa Hosaka | March 3, 1937 | 27 | ? |
| 2 | DF | Hiroshi Katayama | May 28, 1940 | 24 | ? | (Japan) Mitsubishi Heavy Industry |
| 3 | DF | Masakatsu Miyamoto | July 4, 1938 | 26 | ? | (Japan) Furukawa Electric |
| 4 | DF | Ryuzo Hiraki | October 7, 1931 | 33 | ? | (Japan) Furukawa Electric |
| 5 | DF | Yoshitada Yamaguchi | September 28, 1944 | 20 | ? | (Japan) Chuo University |
| 6 | MF | Ryozo Suzuki | September 20, 1939 | 25 | ? | (Japan) Hitachi |
| 7 | DF | Hisao Kami | June 28, 1941 | 23 | ? | (Japan) Yawata Steel |
| 8 | DF | Mitsuo Kamata | December 16, 1937 | 26 | ? |
| 9 | DF | Kiyoshi Tomizawa | December 3, 1943 | 20 | ? |
| 10 | MF | Aritatsu Ogi | December 10, 1942 | 21 | ? | (Japan) Chuo University |
| 11 | MF | Takaji Mori | November 24, 1943 | 20 | ? | (Japan) Waseda University |
| 12 | MF | Saburo Kawabuchi | December 3, 1936 | 26 | ? | (Japan) Furukawa Electric |
| 13 | FW | Shigeo Yaegashi | March 24, 1933 | 31 | ? | (Japan) Furukawa Electric |
| 14 | FW | Masashi Watanabe | January 11, 1936 | 28 | ? | (Japan) Yawata Steel |
| 15 | FW | Kunishige Kamamoto | April 15, 1944 | 20 | ? | (Japan) Waseda University |
| 16 | MF | Teruki Miyamoto | December 26, 1940 | 23 | ? | (Japan) Yawata Steel |
| 17 | MF | Shozo Tsugitani | June 25, 1940 | 24 | ? |
| 18 | FW | Ryuichi Sugiyama | July 4, 1941 | 23 | ? | (Japan) Meiji University |
| 21 | GK | Kenzo Yokoyama | January 21, 1943 | 21 | ? | (Japan) Rikkyo University |

== South Korea ==
Head coach: Chung Kook-chin

| No. | Pos. | Player | DoB | Age | Caps | Club | Tournament games | Tournament goals | Minutes played | Sub off | Sub on | Cards yellow/red |
|---|---|---|---|---|---|---|---|---|---|---|---|---|
| 1 | GK | Ham Heung-chul | November 17, 1930 | 33 | ? | (South Korea) Korea Tungsten | 3 |
| 2 | DF | Kim Jung-suk | October 1, 1939 | 25 | ? | (South Korea) Korea University | 3 |
| 3 | DF | Kim Hong-bok | March 4, 1935 | 29 | ? | (South Korea) Cheil Industries | 3 | | | | | 2 |
| 4 | MF | Kim Sam-rak | June 19, 1940 | 24 | ? | (South Korea) Yonsei University | 2 |
| 5 | FW | Cha Tae-sung | October 8, 1934 | 30 | ? | (South Korea) Cheil Industries | 3 |
| 6 | MF | Kim Young-bai | January 10, 1941 | 23 | ? | (South Korea) Korea Electric Power | 1 |
| 7 | FW | Lee Yi-woo | February 18, 1941 | 23 | ? | (South Korea) Cheil Industries | 2 | 1 |
| 8 | FW | Huh Yoon-jung | September 30, 1936 | 28 | ? | (South Korea) Korea Coal Corporation | 3 |
| 9 | FW | Woo Sang-kwon | February 2, 1926 | 38 | ? | (South Korea) ROK Army Office of the Provost Marshal General | 2 |
| 10 | FW | Cho Yoon-ok | February 25, 1940 | 24 | ? | (South Korea) Korea Tungsten | 3 |
| 11 | FW | Cho Sung-dal | December 8, 1935 | 28 | ? | (South Korea) Korea Electric Power | 2 |
| 12 | MF | Lee Woo-bong | June 8, 1935 | 29 | ? | (South Korea) Korea Electric Power | 1 | | | | | 1 |
| 13 | DF | Kim Jung-nam | January 28, 1943 | 21 | ? | (South Korea) Korea University | 2 |
| 14 | DF | Park Seung-ok | January 28, 1938 | 26 | ? | (South Korea) Korea Tungsten | 1 | | | | | 1 |
| 15 | MF | Kim Chan-ki | December 30, 1932 | 31 | ? | (South Korea) Korea Coal Corporation |
| 16 | MF | Yoo Kwang-joon | March 7, 1932 | 32 | ? | (South Korea) Korea Coal Corporation |
| 17 | FW | Cha Kyung-bok | January 10, 1938 | 26 | ? | (South Korea) ROK Army Office of the Provost Marshal General | 1 |
| 18 | FW | Kim Duk-joong | April 29, 1940 | 24 | ? | (South Korea) Korea Electric Powerr | 1 |
| 19 | GK | Chung Yeong-hwan | December 7, 1938 | 25 | ? | (South Korea) Korea Electric Power |

== Mexico ==
Head coach: Ignacio Trelles

| No. | Pos. | Player | DoB | Age | Caps | Club | Tournament games | Tournament goals | Minutes played | Sub off | Sub on | Cards yellow/red |
|---|---|---|---|---|---|---|---|---|---|---|---|---|
| 1 | GK | Ignacio Calderón | December 13, 1943 | 20 | ? | (Mexico) Club Deportivo Guadalajara |
| 2 | DF | Carlos Gutiérrez | March 31, 1939 | 25 | ? | (Mexico) UNAM |
| 3 | DF | Carlos Albert | July 10, 1943 | 21 | ? | (Mexico) Necaxa |
| 4 | DF | Guillermo Hernández | June 25, 1942 | 22 | ? | (Mexico) Atlas |
| 5 | DF | Miguel Galván | June 23, 1937 | 27 | ? | (Mexico) Necaxa |
| 6 | MF | José Luis González | September 14, 1942 | 22 | ? | (Mexico) UNAM |
| 7 | FW | Felipe Ruvalcaba | February 16, 1941 | 23 | ? | (Mexico) Oro |
| 8 | FW | Javier Fragoso | April 19, 1942 | 22 | ? | (Mexico) América |
| 9 | FW | Ernesto Cisneros | October 26, 1940 | 23 | ? | (Mexico) Zacatepec |
| 10 | FW | Raúl Chávez | March 4, 1939 | 25 | ? | (Mexico) Monterrey |
| 11 | GK | Alejandro Mollinedo | January 7, 1942 | 22 | ? | (Mexico) UNAM |
| 12 | DF | Efrain Loza | January 10, 1939 | 25 | ? | (Mexico) León |
| 13 | MF | Raúl Arellano Gallo | January 17, 1939 | 25 | ? | (Mexico) Cruz Azul |
| 14 | MF | Pablo López | December 4, 1939 | 24 | ? | (Mexico) Atlético Morelia |
| 15 | FW | José Luis Aussín | January 20, 1942 | 22 | ? | (Mexico) Veracruz |
| 16 | MF | Roberto Escalante | June 4, 1940 | 24 | ? | (Mexico) Atlante |
| 17 | MF | Mario Ayala | August 10, 1942 | 22 | ? | (Mexico) América |
| 18 | FW | Albino Morales | May 30, 1940 | 24 | ? | (Mexico) Toluca |

== Morocco ==
Head coach: Mohamed Massoun

| No. | Pos. | Player | DoB | Age | Caps | Club | Tournament games | Tournament goals | Minutes played | Sub off | Sub on | Cards yellow/red |
|---|---|---|---|---|---|---|---|---|---|---|---|---|
| 1 | GK | Allal Benkassou | November 11, 1941 | 20 | ? | (Morocco) FAR Rabat |
| 2 | DF | Abdellah Kastaiani | 1939 | | ? | (Morocco) FAR Rabat |
| 3 | DF | Mustapha Fahim | 1938 | | ? | (Morocco) Wydad Casablanca |
| 4 | DF | Abderrazak Nijam | 1941 | | ? | (Morocco) Wydad Casablanca |
| 5 | DF | Amar Bensiffedine | 1938 | | ? | (Morocco) FAR Rabat |
| 6 | DF | Moulay Khanousi | June 21, 1944 | 20 | ? | (Morocco) MAS Fez |
| 7 | MF | Sadni Nafai | 1940 | | ? | (Morocco) MAS Fez |
| 8 | MF | Mohamed Lamari | 1937 | | ? | (Morocco) FAR Rabat |
| 9 | FW | Abdelkader Mohamed | 1935 | | ? | (Morocco) FAR Rabat |
| 10 | MF | Driss Bamous | December 15, 1942 | 21 | ? | (Morocco) FAR Rabat |
| 11 | FW | Ali Bendayan | 1943 | | ? | (Morocco) Raja Casablanca |
| 12 | GK | Ahmed Laghrissi | 1937 | | ? | (Morocco) MAS Fez |
| 13 | DF | Abdelghani El Mansouri | 1942 | | ? | (Morocco) Wydad Casablanca |
| 14 | MF | Abdelkader Moukhtatif | 1934 | | ? | (Morocco) FAR Rabat |
| 15 | MF | Mohammed Sahraoui | 1942 | | ? | (Morocco) Wydad Casablanca |
| 16 | FW | Abdelkader Morchid | 1937 | | ? | (Morocco) Stade Marocain |
| 17 | FW | Mohamed Kenzeddine | 1939 | | ? | (Morocco) Racing de Casablanca |
| 18 | FW | Ali Bouachra | September 8, 1940 | 24 | ? | (Morocco) Racing de Casablanca |

== Romania ==
Head coach: Silviu Ploeșteanu

| No. | Pos. | Player | DoB | Age | Caps | Club | Tournament games | Tournament goals | Minutes played | Sub off | Sub on | Cards yellow/red |
|---|---|---|---|---|---|---|---|---|---|---|---|---|
| 1 | GK | Ilie Datcu | July 20, 1937 | 27 | ? | (Romania) FC Dinamo București |
| 2 | DF | Ilie Greavu | July 19, 1937 | 27 | ? | (Romania) FC Rapid București |
| 3 | DF | Ion Nunweiller | January 9, 1936 | 28 | ? | (Romania) FC Dinamo București |
| 4 | DF | Bujor Hălmageanu | February 14, 1941 | 23 | ? | (Romania) FC Steaua București |
| 5 | MF | Emerich Jenei | March 22, 1937 | 27 | ? | (Romania) FC Steaua București |
| 6 | DF | Dan Coe | September 8, 1941 | 23 | ? | (Romania) FC Rapid București |
| 7 | MF | Sorin Avram | March 29, 1943 | 21 | ? | (Romania) FC Steaua București |
| 8 | FW | Gheorghe Constantin | December 14, 1932 | 31 | ? | (Romania) FC Steaua București |
| 9 | FW | Ion Ionescu | April 5, 1938 | 26 | ? | (Romania) FC Rapid București |
| 10 | DF | Constantin Koszka | September 17, 1939 | 25 | ? | (Romania) FC Steaua București |
| 11 | MF | Carol Creiniceanu | February 1, 1939 | 25 | ? | (Romania) FC Steaua București |
| 12 | GK | Marin Andrei | October 22, 1940 | 23 | ? | (Romania) FC Rapid București |
| 13 | MF | Mircea Petescu | May 15, 1943 | 21 | ? | (Romania) FC Steaua București |
| 14 | DF | Dumitru Ivan | May 14, 1938 | 26 | ? | (Romania) FC Dinamo București |
| 15 | FW | Emil Petru | September 28, 1939 | 25 | ? | (Romania) FC Dinamo București |
| 16 | FW | Nicolae Georgescu | January 1, 1936 | 28 | ? | (Romania) FC Rapid București |
| 17 | FW | Ion Pârcălab | November 5, 1941 | 22 | ? | (Romania) FC Dinamo București |
| 18 | FW | Emil Dumitriu | November 5, 1942 | 21 | ? | (Romania) FC Rapid București |
| 19 | FW | Cornel Pavlovici | April 2, 1942 | 22 | ? | (Romania) FC Steaua București |
| 20 | GK | Stere Adamache | August 17, 1941 | 23 | ? | (Romania) Steagul Roșu Brașov |

== Yugoslavia ==
Head coach: Ljubomir Lovrić

| No. | Pos. | Player | DoB | Age | Caps | Club | Tournament games | Tournament goals | Minutes played | Sub off | Sub on | Cards yellow/red |
|---|---|---|---|---|---|---|---|---|---|---|---|---|
| 1 | GK | Ivan Ćurković | March 15, 1944 | 20 | ? | (Socialist Federal Republic of Yugoslavia) FK Velež Mostar |
| 2 | DF | Mirsad Fazlagić | April 4, 1943 | 21 | ? | (Socialist Federal Republic of Yugoslavia) FK Sarajevo |
| 3 | DF | Svetozar Vujović | March 3, 1940 | 24 | ? | (Socialist Federal Republic of Yugoslavia) FK Sarajevo |
| 4 | MF | Rudolf Belin | November 4, 1942 | 21 | ? | (Socialist Federal Republic of Yugoslavia) NK Dinamo Zagreb |
| 5 | DF | Milan Čop | October 5, 1938 | 26 | ? | (Socialist Federal Republic of Yugoslavia) Red Star Belgrade |
| 6 | MF | Jovan Miladinović | January 30, 1939 | 25 | ? | (Socialist Federal Republic of Yugoslavia) FK Partizan |
| 7 | FW | Spasoje Samardžić | May 20, 1942 | 22 | ? | (Socialist Federal Republic of Yugoslavia) OFK Beograd |
| 8 | FW | Slaven Zambata | September 24, 1940 | 23 | ? | (Socialist Federal Republic of Yugoslavia) NK Dinamo Zagreb |
| 9 | MF | Ivica Osim | May 6, 1941 | 23 | ? | (Socialist Federal Republic of Yugoslavia) FK Željezničar Sarajevo |
| 10 | MF | Lazar Lemić | September 20, 1937 | 26 | ? | (Socialist Federal Republic of Yugoslavia) FK Novi Sad |
| 11 | MF | Dragan Džajić | May 30, 1946 | 22 | ? | (Socialist Federal Republic of Yugoslavia) Red Star Belgrade |
| 12 | GK | Zlatko Škorić | July 27, 1941 | 23 | ? | (Socialist Federal Republic of Yugoslavia) NK Dinamo Zagreb |
| 13 | DF | Živorad Jevtić | December 27, 1943 | 20 | ? | (Socialist Federal Republic of Yugoslavia) Red Star Belgrade |
| 14 | DF | Lazar Radović | November 13, 1937 | 26 | ? | (Socialist Federal Republic of Yugoslavia) FK Partizan |
| 15 | DF | Marijan Brnčić | July 23, 1940 | 24 | ? | (Socialist Federal Republic of Yugoslavia) NK Rijeka |
| 16 | FW | Đorđe Pavlić | August 28, 1938 | 26 | ? | (Socialist Federal Republic of Yugoslavia) FK Vojvodina |
| 17 | FW | Josip Pirmajer | February 14, 1944 | 20 | ? | (Socialist Federal Republic of Yugoslavia) FK Partizan |
| 18 | MF | Silvester Takač | November 8, 1940 | 23 | ? | (Socialist Federal Republic of Yugoslavia) FK Vojvodina |
