= Football at the 1964 Summer Olympics – Group C =

Football at the Summer Olympics group

Group C of the 1964 Summer Olympics football tournament took place from 12 to 16 October 1964. The group consisted of Brazil, Czechoslovakia, South Korea and United Arab Republic. The top two teams, Czechoslovakia and United Arab Republic, advanced to the quarter-finals.

== Teams ==
Team	Region	Method of qualification	Date of qualification	Finals appearance	Last appearance	Previous best performance							
Team	Region	Method of qualification	Date of qualification	Finals appearance	Last appearance	Previous best performance	Czechoslovakia	Europe	Europe Group 5 winners	15 April 1964	3rd	1924	Second round (1924)
United Arab Republic	Africa	Africa Group 1 winners	17 April 1964	7th	1960	Fourth place (1928)							
Brazil	South America	CONMEBOL play-off winners	7 June 1964	3rd	1960	Quarter-finals (1952)							
South Korea	Asia	Asia Group 1 winners	28 June 1964	1st	—	—							

== Standings ==
Pos	Team	Pld	W	D	L	GF	GA	GD	Pts	Qualification
1	Czechoslovakia	3	3	0	0	12	2	+10	6	Advanced to knockout stage
2	United Arab Republic	3	1	1	1	12	6	+6	3	Advanced to knockout stage
3	Brazil	3	1	1	1	5	2	+3	3	
4	South Korea	3	0	0	3	1	20	−19	0	

Source: RSSSF

In the quarter-finals:

- The winners of Group C, Czechoslovakia, advanced to play the runners-up of Group D, Japan.
- The runners-up of Group C, United Arab Republic, advanced to play the winners of Group D, Ghana.

== Matches ==
All times listed are local, JST (UTC+9).

=== Czechoslovakia vs South Korea ===
12 October 1964
15:00

Czechoslovakia	6–1	South Korea
Lichtnégl 25'; Vojta 26'; Mráz 32', 68'; Masný 43', 71'	Report	Yi-woo 59'

Omiya Park Soccer Stadium, Saitama
Attendance: 12,943
Referee: Rafael Valenzuela (Mexico)

1	František Schmucker
2	Anton Urban
3	Vladimír Weiss
4	Zdeněk Pičman
5	Josef Vojta
6	Ján Geleta
8	Ivan Mráz
9	Karel Lichtnégl
10	Vojtech Masný
11	František Valošek
16	Jan Brumovský
Substitutions:
21	Anton Švajlen
7	Ľudovít Cvetler
12	Karel Knesl
13	Štefan Matlák
14	Karel Nepomucký
15	František Knebort
Manager:
(Czechoslovakia) Rudolf Vytlačil

1	Ham Heung-chul
2	Kim Jung-suk
3	Kim Hong-bok
4	Kim Sam-rak
5	Cha Tae-sung
7	Lee Yi-woo
8	Huh Yoon-jung
9	Woo Sang-kwon
10	Cho Yoon-ok
11	Cho Sung-dal
13	Kim Jung-nam
Substitutions:
21	Kim Kyu-hwan
6	Kim Young-bai
12	Lee Woo-bong
14	Park Seung-ok
15	Kim Chan-ki
16	Yoo Kwang-joon
17	Cha Kyung-bok
18	Kim Duk-joong
19	Chung Yeong-hwan
Manager:
(South Korea) Min Byung-dae

Assistant referees:
Salih Mohamed Boukkili (Morocco)
Aleksandar Škorić (Croatia)

=== Brazil vs United Arab Emirates ===
12 October 1964
15:00

Brazil	1–1	United Arab Republic
Roberto 10'	Report	Shanin 88'

Komazawa Olympic Park Stadium, Tokyo
Attendance: 16,450
Referee: Rudi Glöckner (Germany)

12	Hélio Dias
2	Mura
3	Zé Luiz
4	Valdez
5	Adevaldo
7	Roberto
8	Zé Roberto
10	Ivo Soares
11	Ademar Caravetti
16	Humberto Redes
19	Elizeu
Substitutions:
1	Florisvaldo
6	Íris
9	Geraldo
13	Riva
14	Dimas
17	Mattar
18	Tito
20	Othon
21	Nélio
Manager:
(Brazil) Vicente Feola

1	Fathi Khorshid
3	Moustafa Reyadh
4	Nabil Nosair
6	Khalil Shahin
7	Amin El-Esnawi
10	Yakan Hussein
11	Raafat Attia
13	Mahmoud Hassan
16	Taha Ismail
17	Samir Qotb
19	Badawi Abdel Fattah
Substitutions:
2	Ahmed Reda
5	Mohamed Seddik
8	Ahmed Mostafa
9	Mimi Darwish
12	Rifaat El-Fanagily
14	Farouk Mahmoud
15	Mimi El-Sherbini
18	Ali Kamal Etman
20	Sayed El-Tabbakh
Manager:
(Socialist Federal Republic of Yugoslavia) Josef Vandler

Assistant referees:
Ashgar Teherani (Iran)
Cornel Niţescu (Romania)

=== Czechoslovakia vs United Arab Republic ===
14 October 1964
15:00

Czechoslovakia	5–1	United Arab Republic
Vojta 5', 27'; Urban 36'; Mráz 83'; Cvetler 84'	Report	Riad 53'

Chichibunomiya Rugby Stadium, Tokyo
Attendance: 15,903
Referee: István Zsolt (Hungary)

1	František Schmucker
2	Anton Urban
3	Vladimír Weiss
4	Zdeněk Pičman
5	Josef Vojta
6	Ján Geleta
7	Ľudovít Cvetler
8	Ivan Mráz
9	Karel Lichtnégl
10	Vojtech Masný
16	Jan Brumovský
Substitutions:
21	Anton Švajlen
11	František Valošek
12	Karel Knesl
13	Štefan Matlák
14	Karel Nepomucký
15	František Knebort
Manager:
(Czechoslovakia) Rudolf Vytlačil

1	Fathi Khorshid
3	Moustafa Reyadh
5	Mohamed Seddik
7	Amin El-Esnawi
8	Ahmed Mostafa
9	Mimi Darwish
12	Rifaat El-Fanagily
14	Farouk Mahmoud
16	Taha Ismail
18	Ali Kamal Etman
19	Badawi Abdel Fattah
Substitutions:
2	Ahmed Reda
4	Nabil Nosair
6	Khalil Shahin
10	Yakan Hussein
11	Raafat Attia
13	Mahmoud Hassan
15	Mimi El-Sherbini
17	Samir Qotb
20	Sayed El-Tabbakh
Manager:
(Socialist Federal Republic of Yugoslavia) Josef Vandler

Assistant referees:
Rudi Glöckner (Germany)
Cornel Niţescu (Romania)

=== Brazil vs South Korea ===
14 October 1964
15:00

Brazil	4–0	South Korea
Zé Roberto 30'; Elizeu 44', 54'; Roberto 73'	Report

Mitsuzawa Soccer Stadium, Yokohama
Attendance: 12,672
Referee: Salih Mohamed Boukkili (Morocco)

12	Hélio Dias
2	Mura
3	Zé Luiz
4	Valdez
5	Adevaldo
7	Roberto
8	Zé Roberto
10	Ivo Soares
11	Ademar Caravetti
17	Mattar	Booked
19	Elizeu
Substitutions:
1	Florisvaldo
6	Íris
9	Geraldo
13	Riva
14	Dimas
16	Humberto Redes
18	Tito
20	Othon
21	Nélio
Manager:
(Brazil) Vicente Feola

1	Ham Heung-chul
2	Kim Jung-suk
3	Kim Hong-bok	Booked
5	Cha Tae-sung
6	Kim Young-bai
7	Lee Yi-woo
8	Huh Yoon-jung
10	Cho Yoon-ok
11	Cho Sung-dal
12	Lee Woo-bong	Booked
14	Park Seung-ok	Booked
Substitutions:
21	Kim Kyu-hwan
4	Kim Sam-rak
9	Woo Sang-kwon
13	Kim Jung-nam
15	Kim Chan-ki
16	Yoo Kwang-joon
17	Cha Kyung-bok
18	Kim Duk-joong
19	Chung Yeong-hwan
Manager:
(South Korea) Min Byung-dae

Assistant referees:
Rafael Valenzuela (Mexico)
Gregg de Silva (Malaysia)

=== Czechoslovakia vs Brazil ===
16 October 1964
15:00

Czechoslovakia	1–0	Brazil
Valošek 77'	Report

Omiya Park Soccer Stadium, Saitama
Attendance: 13,120
Referee: Hussein Tehrani (Iran)

21	Anton Švajlen
2	Anton Urban
3	Vladimír Weiss
4	Zdeněk Pičman
5	Josef Vojta
10	Vojtech Masný
11	František Valošek
13	Štefan Matlák
14	Karel Nepomucký
15	František Knebort
16	Jan Brumovský
Substitutions:
1	František Schmucker
6	Ján Geleta
7	Ľudovít Cvetler
8	Ivan Mráz
9	Karel Lichtnégl
12	Karel Knesl
Manager:
(Czechoslovakia) Rudolf Vytlačil

12	Hélio Dias
2	Mura
3	Zé Luiz
4	Valdez
5	Adevaldo
7	Roberto
8	Zé Roberto
10	Ivo Soares
11	Ademar Caravetti
17	Mattar	Booked
19	Elizeu
Substitutions:
1	Florisvaldo
6	Íris
9	Geraldo
13	Riva
14	Dimas
16	Humberto Redes
18	Tito
20	Othon
21	Nélio
Manager:
(Brazil) Vicente Feola

Assistant referees:
István Zsolt (Hungary)
Menachem Ashkenazi (Israel)

=== United Arab Republic vs South Korea ===
16 October 1964
15:00

United Arab Republic	10–0	South Korea
Riad 14', 17', 40', 48', 72', 77'; Mohamed 50'; El-Fanagily 61'; Etman 66'; Hassan 78'	Report

Chichibunomiya Rugby Stadium, Tokyo
Attendance: 16,039
Referee: Glöckner (Germany)

2	Ahmed Reda
3	Moustafa Reyadh
5	Mohamed Seddik
7	Amin El-Esnawi
8	Ahmed Mostafa
9	Mimi Darwish
12	Rifaat El-Fanagily
13	Mahmoud Hassan
16	Taha Ismail
18	Ali Kamal Etman
19	Badawi Abdel Fattah
Substitutions:
1	Fathi Khorshid
4	Nabil Nosair
6	Khalil Shahin
10	Yakan Hussein
11	Raafat Attia
14	Farouk Mahmoud
15	Mimi El-Sherbini
17	Samir Qotb
20	Sayed El-Tabbakh
Manager:
(Socialist Federal Republic of Yugoslavia) Josef Vandler

1	Ham Heung-chul
2	Kim Jung-suk
3	Kim Hong-bok	Booked
4	Kim Sam-rak
5	Cha Tae-sung
8	Huh Yoon-jung
9	Woo Sang-kwon
10	Cho Yoon-ok
13	Kim Jung-nam
17	Cha Kyung-bok
18	Kim Duk-joong
Substitutions:
21	Kim Kyu-hwan
6	Kim Young-bai
7	Lee Yi-woo
11	Cho Sung-dal
12	Lee Woo-bong
14	Park Seung-ok
15	Kim Chan-ki
16	Yoo Kwang-joon
19	Chung Yeong-hwan
Manager:
(South Korea) Min Byung-dae

Assistant referees:
Rafael Valenzuela (Mexico)
Salih Mohamed Boukkili (Morocco)

== See also ==
- Czechoslovakia at the Olympics
- Egypt at the Olympics
- Brazil at the Olympics
- South Korea at the Olympics
