= Football at the 1964 Summer Olympics – Knockout stage =

The knockout stage of the 1964 Summer Olympics football tournament was the second and final stage of the competition, following the first round. Played from 18 to 23 October, the knockout stage ended with the final held at the National Stadium in Tokyo, Japan. The top two team from each group advanced to the knockout stage to compete in a single-elimination tournament. There were eleven matches in the knockout stage, including play-offs played between the losing teams of the quarter-finals and semi-finals for extra allocated finishing positions.

== Format ==
The knockout stage of the 1964 Summer Olympics football tournament was contested between eight teams that qualified from the first round. Matches in the knockout stage were played to a finish. If the score of a match was level at the end of 90 minutes of playing time, extra time was played. If, after two periods of 15 minutes, the scores were still tied, the match was decided by lots.

== Qualified teams ==
The top two placed teams from each of the four groups qualified for the knockout stage.

Group	Winners	Runners-up
A	United Team of Germany	Romania
B	Hungary	Yugoslavia
C	Czechoslovakia	United Arab Republic
D	Ghana	Japan

== Bracket ==
The tournament bracket is shown below, with bold denoting the winners of each match.

Quarter-finals
18 October – Yokohama
Romania	0
**Hungary**	**2**
18 October – Saitama
**United Arab Republic**	**5**
Ghana	1
18 October – Tokyo (KOPS)
**Czechoslovakia**	**4**
Japan	0
18 October – Tokyo (CRS)
Yugoslavia	0
**United Team of Germany**	**1**

Semi-finals
20 October – Tokyo (CRS)
**Hungary**	**6**
United Arab Republic	0
20 October – Tokyo (KOPS)
**Czechoslovakia**	**2**
United Team of Germany	1

Gold medal match
23 October – Tokyo (NS)
**Hungary**	**2**
Czechoslovakia	1
Bronze medal match
23 October – Tokyo (NS)
**United Team of Germany**	**3**
United Arab Republic	1

== Quarter-finals ==
=== Yugoslavia vs United Team of Germany ===
18 October 1964
15:00

Yugoslavia	0–1	United Team of Germany
	Report	Frenzel 1'

Chichibunomiya Rugby Stadium, Tokyo
Attendance: 15,767
Referee: Gregg de Silva (Malaysia)

**1**	Ivan Ćurković
**3**	Svetozar Vujović
**4**	Rudolf Belin
**5**	Milan Čop
**6**	Jovan Miladinović
**8**	Slaven Zambata
**9**	Ivica Osim
**11**	Dragan Džajić
**13**	Živorad Jevtić
**14**	Lazar Radović
**18**	Silvester Takač
Substitutions:
**12**	Zlatko Škorić
**2**	Mirsad Fazlagić
**7**	Spasoje Samardžić
**10**	Lazar Lemić
**15**	Marijan Brnčić
**16**	Đorđe Pavlić
**17**	Josip Pirmajer
Manager:
(Socialist Federal Republic of Yugoslavia) Ljubomir Lovrić

**1**	Jürgen Heinsch
**2**	Klaus Urbanczyk
**3**	Manfred Walter
**4**	Manfred Geisler
**7**	Herbert Pankau
**9**	Gerhard Körner
**11**	Dieter Engelhardt
**13**	Bernd Bauchspieß
**14**	Henning Frenzel
**15**	Otto Fräßdorf
**18**	Eberhard Vogel
Substitutions:
**20**	Horst Weigang
**5**	Klaus-Dieter Seehaus
**6**	Werner Unger
**8**	Peter Rock
**10**	Wolfgang Barthels
**12**	Gerd Backhaus
**16**	Nikola Parchanov
**17**	Klaus Lisiewicz
**19**	Hermann Stöcker
Manager:
(Hungary) Károly Sós

Assistant referees:
Ashgar Teherani (Iran)
Salih Mohamed Boukkili (Morocco)

=== Romania vs Hungary ===
18 October 1964
15:00

Romania	0–2	Hungary
	Report	Csernai 2', 84' (pen.)

Mitsuzawa Soccer Stadium, Yokohama
Attendance: 12,841
Referee: Menachem Ashkenazi (Israel)

**1**	Ilie Datcu
**2**	Ilie Greavu
**3**	Ion Nunweiller
**4**	Bujor Hălmăgeanu
**6**	Dan Coe
**8**	Gheorghe Constantin
**9**	Ion Ionescu
**11**	Carol Creiniceanu
**15**	Emil Petru
**16**	Nicolae Georgescu
**17**	Ion Pârcălab
Substitutions:
**12**	Marin Andrei
**20**	Stere Adamache
**5**	Emerich Jenei
**7**	Sorin Avram
**10**	Constantin Koszka
**13**	Mircea Petescu
**14**	Dumitru Ivan
**18**	Emil Dumitriu
**19**	Cornel Pavlovici
Manager:
(Romania) Silviu Ploeșteanu

**1**	Antal Szentmihályi
**2**	Tibor Csernai
**3**	Dezső Novák
**5**	Árpád Orbán
**6**	Kálmán Ihász
**8**	Károly Palotai
**11**	Imre Komora
**13**	Ferenc Bene
**15**	János Farkas
**16**	Sándor Katona
**18**	Ferenc Nógrádi
Substitutions:
**19**	József Gelei
**4**	Benő Káposzta
**7**	Gusztáv Szepesi
**9**	István Nagy
**10**	György Nagy
**12**	Zoltán Varga
**14**	Antal Dunai
**17**	Pál Orosz
Manager:
(Hungary) Lajos Baróti

Assistant referees:
Duk Chun-kim (South Korea)
Yozo Yokoyama (Japan)

=== Czechoslovakia vs Japan ===
18 October 1964
15:00

Czechoslovakia	4–0	Japan
Brumovský 43', 59'; Vojta 69' (pen.); Mráz 86'	Report

Komazawa Olympic Park Stadium, Tokyo
Attendance: 18,940
Referee: Eunapio de Queiroz (Brazil)

**1**	František Schmucker
**2**	Anton Urban
**3**	Vladimír Weiss
**4**	Zdeněk Pičman
**5**	Josef Vojta
**6**	Ján Geleta
**8**	Ivan Mráz
**9**	Karel Lichtnégl
**10**	Vojtech Masný
**11**	František Valošek
**16**	Jan Brumovský
Substitutions:
**21**	Anton Švajlen
**7**	Ľudovít Cvetler
**12**	Karel Knesl
**13**	Štefan Matlák
**14**	Karel Nepomucký
**15**	František Knebort
Manager:
(Czechoslovakia) Rudolf Vytlačil

**21**	Kenzo Yokoyama
**2**	Hiroshi Katayama
**5**	Yoshitada Yamaguchi
**6**	Ryozo Suzuki
**8**	Mitsuo Kamata
**10**	Aritatsu Ogi
**12**	Saburō Kawabuchi
**13**	Shigeo Yaegashi
**14**	Masashi Watanabe
**15**	Kunishige Kamamoto
**16**	Teruki Miyamoto
Substitutions:
**1**	Tsukasa Hosaka
**3**	Masakatsu Miyamoto
**4**	Ryuzo Hiraki
**7**	Hisao Kami
**9**	Kiyoshi Tomizawa
**11**	Takaji Mori
**17**	Shozo Tsugitani
**18**	Ryūichi Sugiyama
Manager:
(Germany) Dettmar Cramer

Assistant referees:
Miguel Comesaña (Argentina)
Mahmoud Hussein Imam (United Arab Republic)

=== United Arab Republic vs Ghana ===
18 October 1964
15:00

United Arab Republic	5–1	Ghana
Badawi 42', 61'; Reyadh 65'; El-Fanagily 69', 85'	Report	Mfum 37'

Omiya Park Soccer Stadium, Saitama
Attendance: 13,121
Referee: Rudi Glöckner (Germany)

**2**	Ahmed Reda
**3**	Moustafa Reyadh
**7**	Amin El-Esnawi
**8**	Ahmed Mostafa
**9**	Mimi Darwish
**12**	Rifaat El-Fanagily
**13**	Mahmoud Hassan
**15**	Mimi El-Sherbini
**16**	Taha Ismail
**18**	Ali Kamal Etman
**19**	Badawi Abdel Fattah
Substitutions:
**1**	Fathi Khorshid
**4**	Nabil Nosair
**5**	Mohamed Seddik
**6**	Khalil Shahin
**10**	Yakan Hussein
**11**	Raafat Attia
**14**	Farouk Mahmoud
**17**	Samir Qotb
**20**	Sayed El-Tabbakh
Manager:
(Socialist Federal Republic of Yugoslavia) Josef Vandler

**1**	Nii Dodoo Ankrah
**2**	Sam Acquah
**3**	Emmanuel Oblitey
**4**	Ben Acheampong
**5**	Charles Addo Odametey
**6**	Emmanuel Kwesi Nkansah
**8**	Wilberforce Mfum
**9**	Edward Aggrey-Fynn
**11**	Kofi Pare
**17**	Joseph Agyemang-Gyau
**18**	Mohammadu Salisu
Substitutions:
**13**	Addoquaye Laryea
**7**	Osei Kofi
**10**	Edward Acquah
**12**	Abdul Ramonu Gibirine
**14**	Kwame Atta
**15**	Gladstone Ofori
**16**	Samuel Okai
**19**	Kofi Anoi
**20**	Frank Odoi
**21**	Joseph Adjei
Manager:
(Ghana) Charles Gyamfi

Assistant referees:
Václav Korelus (Czechoslovakia)
Rafael Valenzuela (Mexico)

== Semi-finals ==
=== Czechoslovakia vs United Team of Germany ===
20 October 1964
15:00

Czechoslovakia	2–1	United Team of Germany
Lichtnégl 47'; Mráz 89'	Report	Nöldner 25'

Komazawa Olympic Park Stadium, Tokyo
Attendance: 19,435
Referee: Menachem Ashkenazi (Israel)

**1**	František Schmucker
**2**	Anton Urban
**3**	Vladimír Weiss
**5**	Josef Vojta
**6**	Ján Geleta
**8**	Ivan Mráz
**9**	Karel Lichtnégl
**10**	Vojtech Masný
**11**	František Valošek
**12**	Karel Knesl
**16**	Jan Brumovský
Substitutions:
**21**	Anton Švajlen
**4**	Zdeněk Pičman
**7**	Ľudovít Cvetler
**13**	Štefan Matlák
**14**	Karel Nepomucký
**15**	František Knebort
Manager:
(Czechoslovakia) Rudolf Vytlačil

**1**	Jürgen Heinsch
**2**	Klaus Urbanczyk
**3**	Manfred Walter
**4**	Manfred Geisler
**7**	Herbert Pankau
**9**	Gerhard Körner
**14**	Henning Frenzel
**15**	Otto Fräßdorf
**16**	Nikola Parchanov
**18**	Eberhard Vogel
**19**	Hermann Stöcker
Substitutions:
**20**	Horst Weigang
**5**	Klaus-Dieter Seehaus
**6**	Werner Unger
**8**	Peter Rock
**10**	Wolfgang Barthels
**11**	Dieter Engelhardt
**12**	Gerd Backhaus
**13**	Bernd Bauchspieß
**17**	Klaus Lisiewicz
Manager:
(Hungary) Károly Sós

Assistant referees:
Rafael Valenzuela (Mexico)
John Stanley Wontumi (Ghana)

=== Hungary vs United Arab Republic ===
20 October 1964
15:00

Hungary	6–0	United Arab Republic
Bene 7', 20', 66', 77'; Komora 29', 58'	Report

Chichibunomiya Rugby Stadium, Tokyo
Referee: Miguel Comesaña (Argentina)

**1**	Antal Szentmihályi
**2**	Tibor Csernai
**3**	Dezső Novák
**5**	Árpád Orbán
**6**	Kálmán Ihász
**8**	Károly Palotai
**11**	Imre Komora
**13**	Ferenc Bene
**15**	János Farkas
**16**	Sándor Katona
**18**	Ferenc Nógrádi
Substitutions:
**19**	József Gelei
**4**	Benő Káposzta
**7**	Gusztáv Szepesi
**9**	István Nagy
**10**	György Nagy
**12**	Zoltán Varga
**14**	Antal Dunai
**17**	Pál Orosz
Manager:
(Hungary) Lajos Baróti

**2**	Ahmed Reda
**3**	Moustafa Reyadh
**6**	Khalil Shahin
**7**	Amin El-Esnawi
**8**	Ahmed Mostafa
**9**	Mimi Darwish
**12**	Rifaat El-Fanagily
**13**	Mahmoud Hassan
**15**	Mimi El-Sherbini
**18**	Ali Kamal Etman
**19**	Badawi Abdel Fattah
Substitutions:
**1**	Fathi Khorshid
**4**	Nabil Nosair
**5**	Mohamed Seddik
**10**	Yakan Hussein
**11**	Raafat Attia
**14**	Farouk Mahmoud
**16**	Taha Ismail
**17**	Samir Qotb
**20**	Sayed El-Tabbakh
Manager:
(Socialist Federal Republic of Yugoslavia) Josef Vandler

Assistant referees:
Genichi Fukushima (Japan)
Sumio Hayakawa (Japan)

== First consolation round ==
=== Japan vs Yugoslavia ===
20 October 1964
15:00

Japan	1–6	Yugoslavia
Kamamoto 61'	Report	Zambata 3', 5', 43', 63'; Osim 28', 60'

Nagai Stadium, Osaka
Attendance: 20,000
Referee: Hussein Imam (United Arab Emirates)

**21**	Kenzo Yokoyama
**2**	Hiroshi Katayama
**3**	Masakatsu Miyamoto
**5**	Yoshitada Yamaguchi
**6**	Ryozo Suzuki
**8**	Mitsuo Kamata
**10**	Aritatsu Ogi
**12**	Saburō Kawabuchi
**13**	Shigeo Yaegashi
**15**	Kunishige Kamamoto
**18**	Ryūichi Sugiyama
Substitutions:
**1**	Tsukasa Hosaka
**4**	Ryuzo Hiraki
**7**	Hisao Kami
**9**	Kiyoshi Tomizawa
**11**	Takaji Mori
**14**	Masashi Watanabe
**16**	Teruki Miyamoto
**17**	Shozo Tsugitani
Manager:
(Germany) Dettmar Cramer

**1**	Ivan Ćurković
**2**	Mirsad Fazlagić
**3**	Svetozar Vujović
**4**	Rudolf Belin
**5**	Milan Čop
**6**	Jovan Miladinović
**8**	Slaven Zambata
**9**	Ivica Osim
**11**	Dragan Džajić
**14**	Lazar Radović
**18**	Silvester Takač
Substitutions:
**12**	Zlatko Škorić
**7**	Spasoje Samardžić
**10**	Lazar Lemić
**13**	Živorad Jevtić
**15**	Marijan Brnčić
**16**	Đorđe Pavlić
**17**	Josip Pirmajer
Manager:
(Socialist Federal Republic of Yugoslavia) Ljubomir Lovrić

Assistant referees:
Eunápio de Queiròz (Brazil)
István Zsolt (Hungary)

=== Romania vs Ghana ===
20 October 1964
15:00

Romania	4–2	Ghana
Pavlovici 12', 19', 74'; Creiniceanu 41'	Report	Aggrey-Fynn 25', 44'

Nishikyogoku Athletic Stadium, Kyoto
Attendance: 10,000
Referee: Gregg de Silva (Malaysia)

**12**	Marin Andrei
**2**	Ilie Greavu
**4**	Bujor Hălmăgeanu
**5**	Emerich Jenei
**6**	Dan Coe
**9**	Ion Ionescu
**11**	Carol Creiniceanu
**13**	Mircea Petescu
**16**	Nicolae Georgescu
**17**	Ion Pârcălab
**19**	Cornel Pavlovici
Substitutions:
**1**	Ilie Datcu
**20**	Stere Adamache
**3**	Ion Nunweiller
**7**	Sorin Avram
**8**	Gheorghe Constantin
**10**	Constantin Koszka
**14**	Dumitru Ivan
**15**	Emil Petru
**18**	Emil Dumitriu
Manager:
(Romania) Silviu Ploeșteanu

**13**	Addoquaye Laryea
**2**	Sam Acquah
**3**	Emmanuel Oblitey
**4**	Ben Acheampong
**5**	Charles Addo Odametey
**7**	Osei Kofi
**8**	Wilberforce Mfum
**9**	Edward Aggrey-Fynn
**11**	Kofi Pare
**17**	Joseph Agyemang-Gyau
**20**	Frank Odoi
Substitutions:
**1**	Nii Dodoo Ankrah
**6**	Emmanuel Kwesi Nkansah
**10**	Edward Acquah
**12**	Abdul Ramonu Gibirine
**14**	Kwame Atta
**15**	Gladstone Ofori
**16**	Samuel Okai
**18**	Mohammadu Salisu
**19**	Kofi Anoi
**21**	Joseph Adjei
Manager:
(Ghana) Charles Gyamfi

Assistant referees:
Kim Duk-chun (South Korea)
Taro Ikeda (Japan)

== Fifth place play-off ==
22 October 1964
15:00

Yugoslavia	0–3	Romania
	Report	Pavlovici 50'; Pârcălab 72'; Constantin 78'

Nagai Stadium, Osaka
Attendance: 10,000
Referee: István Zsolt (Hungary)

**1**	Ivan Ćurković
**3**	Svetozar Vujović
**4**	Rudolf Belin
**6**	Jovan Miladinović
**8**	Slaven Zambata
**9**	Ivica Osim
**11**	Dragan Džajić
**13**	Živorad Jevtić
**15**	Marijan Brnčić
**17**	Josip Pirmajer
**18**	Silvester Takač
Substitutions:
**12**	Zlatko Škorić
**2**	Mirsad Fazlagić
**5**	Milan Čop
**7**	Spasoje Samardžić
**10**	Lazar Lemić
**14**	Lazar Radović
**16**	Đorđe Pavlić
Manager:
(Socialist Federal Republic of Yugoslavia) Ljubomir Lovrić

**1**	Ilie Datcu
**2**	Ilie Greavu
**4**	Bujor Hălmăgeanu
**6**	Dan Coe
**8**	Gheorghe Constantin
**10**	Constantin Koszka
**11**	Carol Creiniceanu
**13**	Mircea Petescu
**15**	Emil Petru
**17**	Ion Pârcălab
**19**	Cornel Pavlovici
Substitutions:
**12**	Marin Andrei
**20**	Stere Adamache
**3**	Ion Nunweiller
**5**	Emerich Jenei
**7**	Sorin Avram
**9**	Ion Ionescu
**14**	Dumitru Ivan
**16**	Nicolae Georgescu
**18**	Emil Dumitriu
Manager:
(Romania) Silviu Ploeșteanu

Assistant referees:
Eunápio de Queiròz (Brazil)
Taro Ikeda (Japan)

== Bronze medal match ==
23 October 1964
13:00

United Team of Germany	3–1	United Arab Republic
Frenzel 17'; Vogel 48'; Stöcker 56'	Report	Attia 75' (pen.)

Olympic Stadium, Tokyo
Attendance: 65,610
Referee: Yozo Yokoyama (Japan)

**1**	Jürgen Heinsch
**3**	Manfred Walter
**4**	Manfred Geisler
**7**	Herbert Pankau
**8**	Peter Rock
**9**	Gerhard Körner
**14**	Henning Frenzel
**15**	Otto Fräßdorf
**16**	Nikola Parchanov
**18**	Eberhard Vogel
**19**	Hermann Stöcker
Substitutions:
**20**	Horst Weigang
**2**	Klaus Urbanczyk
**5**	Klaus-Dieter Seehaus
**6**	Werner Unger
**10**	Wolfgang Barthels
**11**	Dieter Engelhardt
**12**	Gerd Backhaus
**13**	Bernd Bauchspieß
**17**	Klaus Lisiewicz
Manager:
(Hungary) Károly Sós

**2**	Ahmed Reda
**3**	Moustafa Reyadh
**4**	Nabil Nosair
**5**	Mohamed Seddik
**7**	Amin El-Esnawi
**10**	Yakan Hussein	Yellow card
**11**	Raafat Attia
**15**	Mimi El-Sherbini
**17**	Samir Qotb
**18**	Ali Kamal Etman
**19**	Badawi Abdel Fattah	Yellow card
Substitutions:
**1**	Fathi Khorshid
**6**	Khalil Shahin
**8**	Ahmed Mostafa
**9**	Mimi Darwish
**12**	Rifaat El-Fanagily
**13**	Mahmoud Hassan
**14**	Farouk Mahmoud
**16**	Taha Ismail
**20**	Sayed El-Tabbakh
Manager:
(Socialist Federal Republic of Yugoslavia) Josef Vandler

Assistant referees:
Genichi Fukushima (Japan)
Sumio Hayakawa (Japan)

== Gold medal match ==
23 October 1964
17:30

Hungary	2–1	Czechoslovakia
Weiss 47' (o.g.); Bene 59'	Report	Brumovský 80'

Olympic Stadium, Tokyo
Attendance: 65,610
Referee: Menachem Ashkenazi (Israel)

**Hungary**	**Czechoslovakia**

GK	1	Antal Szentmihályi
RB	3	Dezső Novák
LB	6	Kálmán Ihász
RH	7	Gusztáv Szepesi
CH	5	Árpád Orbán
LH	18	Ferenc Nógrádi
OR	15	János Farkas
IR	2	Tibor Csernai
CF	13	Ferenc Bene
IL	11	Imre Komora
OL	16	Sándor Katona
Substitutions:
	19	József Gelei
	4	Benő Káposzta
	8	Károly Palotai
	9	István Nagy
	10	György Nagy
	12	Zoltán Varga
	14	Antal Dunai
	17	Pál Orosz
Manager:
(Hungary) Lajos Baróti

GK	1	František Schmucker
RB	2	Anton Urban
LB	4	Zdeněk Pičman
RH	5	Josef Vojta
CH	3	Vladimír Weiss
LH	6	Ján Geleta
OR	16	Jan Brumovský
IR	8	Ivan Mráz
CF	9	Karel Lichtnégl
IL	10	Vojtech Masný
OL	11	František Valošek
Substitutions:
	21	Anton Švajlen
	7	Ľudovít Cvetler
	12	Karel Knesl
	13	Štefan Matlák
	14	Karel Nepomucký
	15	František Knebort
Manager:
(Czechoslovakia) Rudolf Vytlačil

Assistant referees:
Miguel Comesaña (Japan)
John Stanley Wontumi (Ghana)
