= Florisvaldo =

Florisvaldo is a given name. Notable people with the name include:

- Florisvaldo (footballer) (born 1943), Brazilian footballer
- Florisvaldo de Oliveira (1958–2012), Brazilian vigilante and serial killer
