= José Pereira =

José Pereira may refer to:

- José Pereira (baseball) (1927–2001), Puerto Rican professional baseball player
- José Pereira (footballer) (born 1931), Portuguese goalkeeper
- José Pereira (pentathlete) (born 1918), Portuguese Olympic pentathlete
- José Pereira (scholar) (1931–2015), Sanskrit scholar, writer, and artist
- José Pereira (swimmer) (born 1955), Portuguese Olympic swimmer
- José Pereira (tennis) (born 1991), Brazilian tennis player
- José Maria Pereira (born 1932), Brazilian Olympic fencer
- José Pacheco Pereira (born 1949), Portuguese political analyst, historian, and politician
- José Carlos Pereira, Brazilian Air Force officer
- José António Pereira, Portuguese merchant, ship owner, and slave trader
- José Luiz Pereira (born 1943), Brazilian former footballer
