= Rudi Glöckner =

German football referee (1929–1999)

Rudolf Glöckner
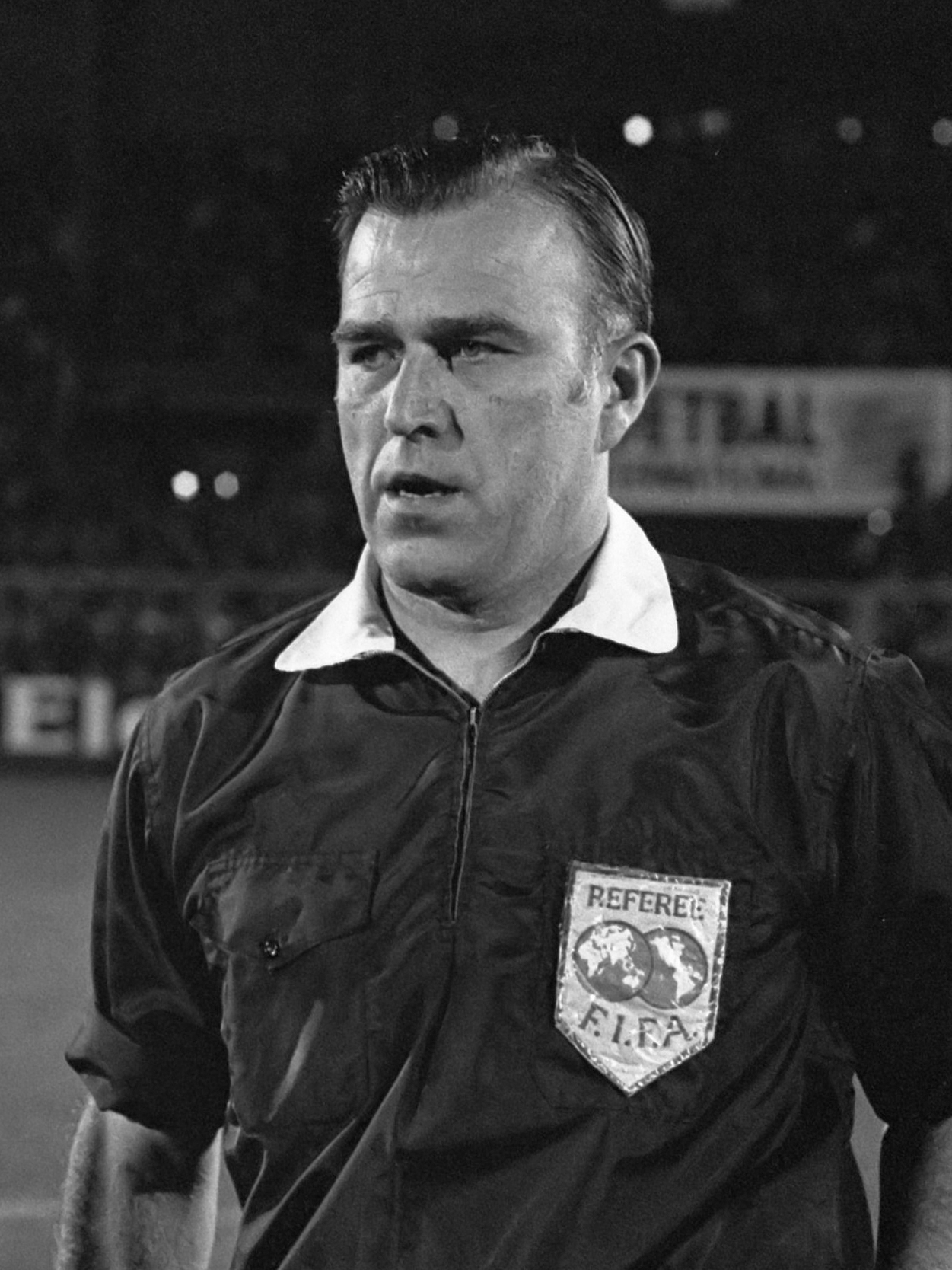
- Glöckner in 1973
- Born: 20 March 1929; Markranstädt, Saxony, Germany
- Died: 25 January 1999 (aged 69); Markranstädt, Saxony, Germany

Domestic
Years	League	Role
1959–1977	DDR-Oberliga	Referee

International
Years	League	Role
1963–1977	UEFA	Referee
1966–1977	FIFA	Referee

Rudolf Glöckner (20 March 1929 – 25 January 1999) was an East German football referee. Nicknamed "De Glocke" (lit. 'The Bell'), he was the referee of the 1970 FIFA World Cup final between Brazil and Italy in Mexico City, becoming the first German referee to officiate a FIFA World Cup final.

== Football career ==
Glöckner joined Sportfreunde Markranstädt as a footballer in 1951, playing in the regional leagues of East Germany. He was a member of the club for 15 years, where he also worked as a youth team coach and served as the club's head of football development.

== Refereeing career ==
In 1952, while still a player at Sportfreunde Markranstädt, Glöckner took an interest in becoming a referee. His first recorded match as a referee was in 1958, during a FDGB-Pokal second round match between Meeraner SV and SC 06 Oberlind.

In 1964, Glöckner was selected as a referee for the football tournament at the 1964 Summer Olympics in Japan. There, he was chosen to officiate three matches, each of them involving the United Arab Republic, including their Group C matches against Brazil and South Korea, and quarter-final match against Ghana. He returned to the Summer Olympics as a referee in 1972, where he officiated the match between Morocco and the United States in West Germany.

In 1966, Glöckner was officiating a friendly between the Netherlands and Czechoslovakia, when he sent off 19-year-old Dutch forward Johan Cruyff, who was only making his second appearance for the Netherlands, becoming the first Dutch international to ever receive a red card. Cruyff was later banned from international football for a year by the KNVB.

Shortly after refereeing the 1970 FIFA World Cup final, Glöckner was selected to officiate the first leg of the 1970 Intercontinental Cup between Feyenoord and Estudiantes de La Plata in Buenos Aires, which ended in a 2–2 draw. The following year, he also officiated the second leg of the 1971 Inter-Cities Fairs Cup final between Leeds United and Juventus. He was also chosen to officiate the second leg of the 1973 European Super Cup between Ajax and AC Milan. Earlier that year, in the first leg of the semi-finals of the 1972–73 European Cup between Ajax and Real Madrid, Glöckner was heavily criticsed by the Real Madrid players and staff when he awarded a controversial indirect free-kick for an alleged foul when Ajax's Johan Cruyff brushed against Real Madrid defender Goyo Benito while trying to put pressure on goalkeeper Mariano García Remón; Ruud Krol subsequently converted it, giving Ajax a 2–0 lead. Ajax went on to win the first leg 2–1 at home, and later advanced to the final 3–1 on aggregate, where they defeated Juventus 1–0 to win the title. He later also officiated the second leg of the 1976 UEFA Cup final between Club Brugge and Liverpool.

The week after the UEFA Cup final, Glöckner officiated the second leg of the UEFA Euro 1976 quarter-finals between Wales and Yugoslavia at Ninian Park in Cardiff. He made several controversial decisions during the match, including awarding Yugoslavia a penalty after Danilo Popivoda dived in the first half and ruling out John Toshack's goal after the break, because of a John Mahoney bicycle kick, which he deemed too dangerous. As Welsh fans threw full beer cans at him and aimed Nazi salutes towards him, he suspended the game and threatened to leave the pitch. Following the restart, he disallowed a goal by John Toshack due to his being offside, which prompted Welsh fans to continue throwing beer cans at him. At the end of the match, he had to be escorted off the field by 16 police officers for his safety, with one Welsh fan attempting to hurl a corner flag like a spear at him, which ended up hitting one of the policemen.

A few weeks after the Wales-Yugoslavia match, Glöckner officiated a match during the final matchday of the 1975–76 Czechoslovak First League between Slovan Bratislava and Slavia Prague, which Slovan Bratislava won 2–0.

Overall, Glöckner officiated 107 international matches, including 24 senior international matches, some of which were at the 1970 and 1974 FIFA World Cups.

=== 1970 FIFA World Cup final ===
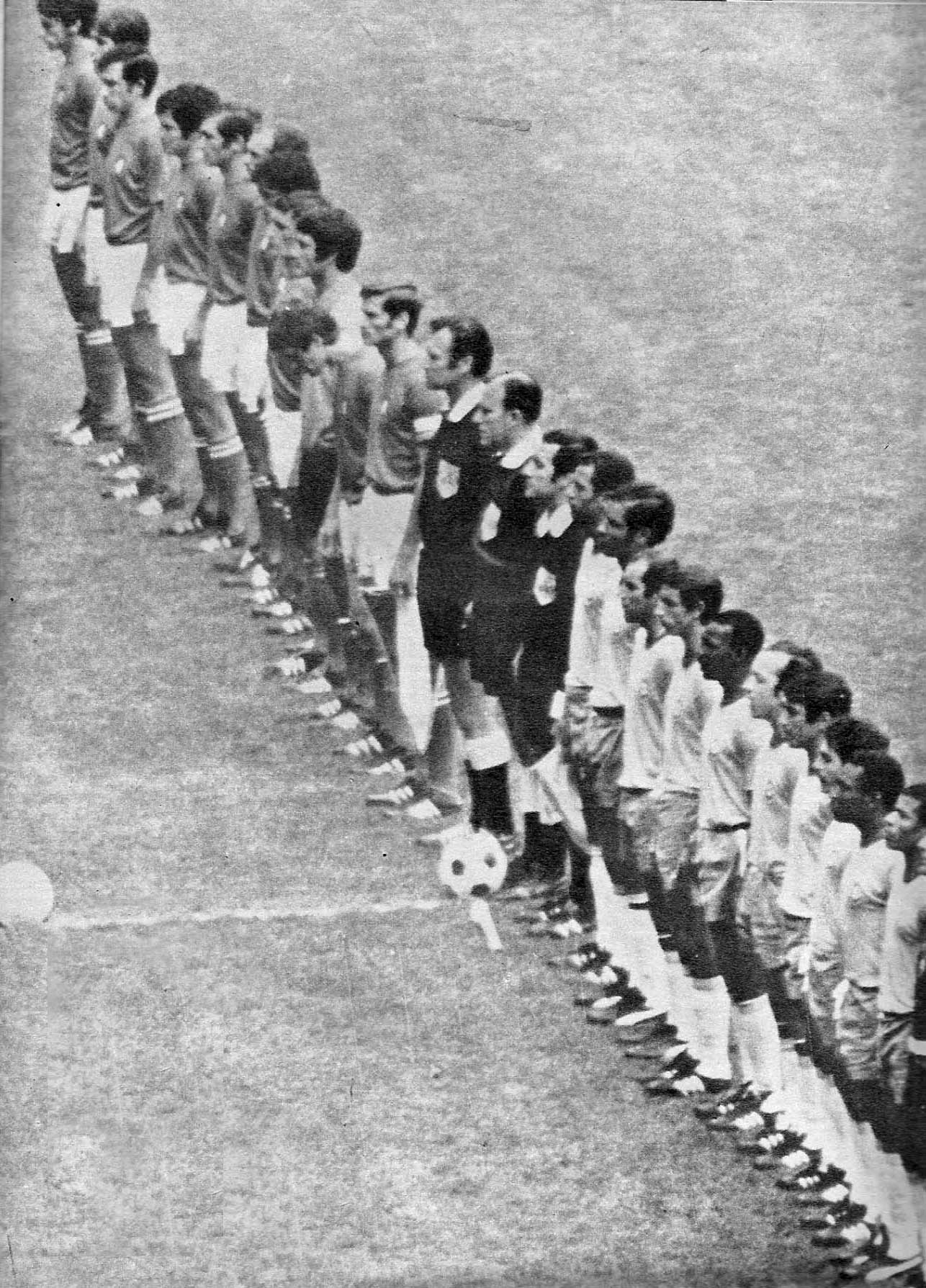
Glöckner, along with assistant referees Rudolf Scheurer and Ángel Coerezza, lined up with the Brazil and Italy teams prior to the final.

Glöckner was chosen as the referee for the 1970 FIFA World Cup final following a dispute between the Brazilian and Italian federations, with the Brazilians rejecting having one of the well-known European referees officiating, while the Italians did not want a South American referee. Glöckner, who at the time was still relatively unknown, was chosen for the final, with Rudolf Scheurer and Ángel Coerezza as his assistants.

At the time, Glöckner had only officiated four international matches as a referee, with the final set to be his fifth. To distract himself from the excitement of officiating a FIFA World Cup final, he played skat with East German national team manager Georg Buschner and sports journalist Heinz Florian Oertel, who were both part of the small East German delegation for the tournament.

Following the final, Mexican newspaper El Heraldo commented that Glöckner "officiated [the match] like a true gentleman."

== Death and legacy ==
Glöckner died on 25 January 1999, at the age of 69.

In August 2024, a secondary school in Grünau, Leipzig, was renamed after him.

== Major matches refereed ==
Date	Match	Tournament	Venue	Result	Ref
21 June 1970	Brazil vs. Italy	1970 FIFA World Cup final	Estadio Azteca, Mexico City	4–1	
26 August 1970	Estudiantes de La Plata vs. Feyenoord	1970 Intercontinental Cup final (first leg)	La Bombonera, Buenos Aires	2–2 (2–3 on aggregate)	
3 June 1971	Leeds United vs. Juventus	1971 Inter-Cities Fairs Cup final	Elland Road, Leeds	1–1 (3–3 on aggregate; Leeds won on away goals)	
16 January 1974	Ajax vs. Milan	1973 European Super Cup final	Olympisch Stadion, Amsterdam	6–0 (6–1 on aggregate)	
19 May 1976	Liverpool vs. Club Brugge	1976 UEFA Cup final (second leg)	Olympiastadion, Bruges	1–1 (4–3 on aggregate)	

Sporting positions (East Germany) Rudi Glöckner
Preceded by 1966 FIFA World Cup final (Switzerland) Gottfried Dienst	1970 FIFA World Cup final referee	Succeeded by 1974 FIFA World Cup final (England) Jack Taylor
