= Samuel Okai =

Ghanaian footballer

Personal information
- Date of birth: 6 June 1936 (age 90)
- Position: Defender

International career
Years	Team	Apps	(Gls)
- Ghana

Samuel Okai (born 6 June 1936) is a Ghanaian footballer. He competed in the men's tournament at the 1964 Summer Olympics.
