= Korea Coal Corporation =

South Korean coal mining company

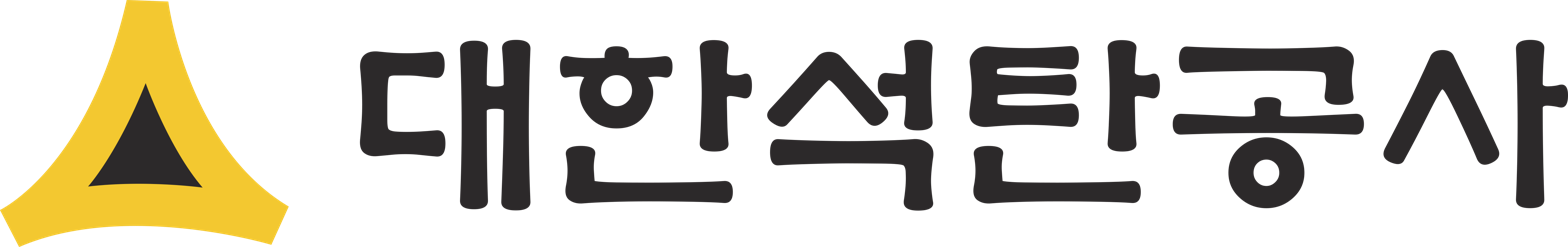
- Native name: 대한석탄공사 (Daehan Seoktan Gongsa)
- Company type: State-owned corporation
- Industry: Mining
- Founded: 1950; 76 years ago
- Defunct: 2025
- Headquarters: Gangwon State, Wonju, South Korea
- Products: Coal
- Parent: Ministry of Trade
- Website: kocoal.or.kr (in Korean and English)

The Korea Coal Corporation, also known as Korea Coal or KOCOAL, was a state-run corporation which operated in the coal-mining industry in South Korea. Korea Coal was established in 1950. It was headquartered in Wonju, Gangwon Province.

Jangseong Coal Mine was closed in September 2024. Korea Coal's last mine closed in June 2025.

== See also ==
- Economy of South Korea
- Energy law
- Government of South Korea
