= Emmanuel Oblitey =

Ghanaian footballer (1934–2023)

Personal information
- Date of birth: 5 February 1934
- Date of death: 19 March 2023 (aged 89)
- Place of death: Accra, Ghana
- Position: Defender

International career
| Years | Team | Apps | (Gls) |
- Ghana

Emmanuel Oblitey (5 February 1934 – 19 March 2023) was a Ghanaian footballer who played as a defender. He competed in the men's tournament at the 1964 Summer Olympics.
