= Emmanuel Kwesi Nkansah =

Ghanaian footballer (born 1941)

Personal information
- Date of birth: 15 October 1941 (age 85)
- Position: Midfielder

International career
Years	Team	Apps	(Gls)
- Ghana

Emmanuel Kwesi Nkansah (born 15 October 1941) is a Ghanaian former footballer. He competed in the men's tournament at the 1964 Summer Olympics.
