= Kim Hong-bok =

South Korean footballer (born 1935)

Personal information
- Date of birth: 4 March 1935
- Date of death: unknown

International career
Years	Team	Apps	(Gls)
- South Korea
Medal record
Men's football
Representing South Korea (as player)
AFC Asian Cup
Gold medal – first place	1960 South Korea	Team

- Kim Hong-bok
- Hangul: 김홍복
- Hanja: 金洪福
- RR: Gim Hongbok
- MR: Kim Hongbok

Kim Hong-bok (born 4 March 1935, date of death unknown) was a South Korean footballer. He was part of the squad that won the 1960 AFC Asian Cup. He also competed in the 1964 Summer Olympics. He was the father of Olympic basketball player Kim Hwa-soon. Kim is deceased.
