= Karam Nirlou =

Iranian footballer

Personal information
- Full name: Karam Ali Nirlou
- Date of birth: 19 March 1943
- Place of birth: Tehran, Iran
- Date of death: 1983 (aged 39–40)
- Height: 1.75 m (5 ft 9 in)
- Position: Midfielder

Senior career*
| Years | Team | Apps | (Gls) |
| 1964–1965 | Taj SC | | |

International career
| 1964–1965 | Iran | 2 | (1) |
- * Club domestic league appearances and goals

Karam Ali Nirlou (19 March 1943 – 1983) was an Iranian football midfielder who played for Iran in the 1964 Summer Olympics. He also played for Taj SC.

He played in two games for Iran in the 1964 Summer Olympics against Romania and Mexico and scored his only national goal against Mexico.

== Record at Olympic Games ==
| National team | Year | Apps | Goals |
|---|---|---|---|
| Iran | 1964 | 2 | 1 |
