= Mohammadu Salisu =

Ghanaian footballer (born 1934)

Personal information
- Date of birth: 10 September 1934
- Position: Forward

International career
Years	Team	Apps	(Gls)
- Ghana

Mohammadu Salisu (born 10 September 1934, date of death unknown) was a Ghanaian footballer. He competed in the men's tournament at the 1964 Summer Olympics. Salisu died before 2013.
