= Dimas Filgueiras =

Brazilian footballer (1944–2023)

Personal information
- Full name: Dimas Filgueiras Filho
- Date of birth: 13 May 1944
- Place of birth: Rio de Janeiro, Brazil
- Date of death: 22 December 2023 (aged 79)
- Place of death: Fortaleza, Ceará, Brazil
- Position: Defender

Senior career*
Years	Team	Apps	(Gls)
1963–1970	Botafogo		
1971–1972	Fortaleza		
1972–1976	Ceará		

International career
1964	Brazil Olympic	3	(0)

Managerial career
- 2010: Ceará
- * Club domestic league appearances and goals

Dimas Filgueiras Filho (13 May 1944 – 22 December 2023) was a Brazilian football player and manager. A defender, he represented Brazil at the 1964 Summer Olympics. At club level, he played for Botafogo, Fortaleza and Ceará.

== Career ==
Born in Rio de Janeiro, Filgueiras played for Botafogo between 1963 and 1970. He joined Fortaleza 1971 before moving to Ceará the following year where remained until 1976. At Ceará, he made 133 appearances and became a two-time state champion in 1975 and in 1976.

After his retirement from playing, Filgueiras worked for Ceará in various functions, repeatedly taking over as interim manager. Having spent 46 years with the club he left in January 2016.

== Personal life and death ==
Towards the end of his life Filgueiras suffered from Alzheimer's disease. He died on 22 December 2023, at the age of 79.
