= Klaus Lisiewicz =

German footballer

Personal information
- Date of birth: 2 February 1943 (age 83)
- Position: Forward
Medal record
Men's football
Representing Germany
Olympic Games
Bronze medal – third place	1964 Tokyo	Team competition

Klaus Lisiewicz (born 2 February 1943) is a German former football player who competed in the 1964 Summer Olympics. Lisiewicz played as a forward for his team.
