= Cho Sung-dal =

South Korean footballer

Personal information
- Full name: Cho Sung-dal
- Date of birth: 8 December 1935 (age 90)
- Place of birth: Korea, Empire of Japan
- Position: Forward

College career
Years	Team	Apps	(Gls)
1955	Cheongju University		
1960–1961	Kyung Hee University		

Senior career*
Years	Team	Apps	(Gls)
1957–1959	ROK Marine Corps		
1962–1968	Korea Electric Power		

International career
1961–1967	South Korea	16	(3)
- * Club domestic league appearances and goals

- Cho Sung-dal
- Hangul: 조성달
- Hanja: 趙成達
- RR: Jo Seongdal
- MR: Cho Sŏngdal

Cho Sung-dal (born 8 December 1935) is a former South Korean footballer who competed in the 1964 Summer Olympics.

== Honours ==
ROK Marine Corps

- Korean National Championship: 1957, 1959

Kyung Hee University

- Korean National Championship: 1960, 1961

Korea Electric Power

- Korean National Semipro League (Spring): 1965
- Korean National Semipro League (Autumn): 1967
- Korean National Championship: 1962, 1965

Individual

- KASA Best Korean Footballer: 1965
