= Mattar (Brazilian footballer) =

Brazilian footballer

Personal information
- Full name: Antônio Mattar Neto
- Date of birth: 24 November 1944 (age 81)
- Position: Forward

Senior career*
Years	Team	Apps	(Gls)
- Comercial
- * Club domestic league appearances and goals

Antônio Mattar Neto (born 14 November 1944) is a Brazilian former footballer who competed in the 1964 Summer Olympics.
