= Park Seung-ok =

South Korean footballer

- Hangul: 박승옥
- Hanja: 朴承玉
- RR: Bak Seungok
- MR: Pak Sŭngok

Park Seung-ok (born 28 January 1938) is a South Korean former footballer who competed in the 1964 Summer Olympics.
