= Juan Carlos Domínguez (footballer) =

Argentine footballer

Personal information
- Date of birth: November 3, 1943
- Place of birth: Zárate, Argentina
- Date of death: 9 August 2021 (aged 77)
- Position: Forward

Senior career*
Years	Team	Apps	(Gls)
1964	River Plate		
- * Club domestic league appearances and goals

Juan Carlos Domínguez (Zárate, Argentina, 3 November 1943 – 9 August 2021) was an Argentine footballer who competed in the 1964 Summer Olympics.
