= Mahmoud Hassan (footballer, born 1943) =

Egyptian footballer (born 1943)

Personal information
- Full name: Mahmoud Hassan
- Date of birth: 19 November 1943 (age 82)
- Place of birth: Egypt
- Position: Midfielder

Senior career*
Years	Team	Apps	(Gls)
- Tersana SC

International career
1964	United Arab Republic	4	(1)
Medal record
Men's Football
Representing United Arab Republic
Africa Cup of Nations
Third place	1963 Ghana
- * Club domestic league appearances and goals

Mahmoud Hassan (born 19 November 1943) is an Egyptian former footballer who played as a midfielder.

== Career ==
Hassan was included in Egypt's squad (then called the United Arab Republic) for the football tournament at the 1964 Summer Olympics in Tokyo, Japan. He made his debut for the team on 12 October 1964 in a 1–1 draw with Brazil during the group stage. On 16 October, he scored his first goal for the team, getting the final goal in the 10–0 win over South Korea. The team managed to reach the semi-finals of the competition before losing to eventual gold medalists Hungary. The team finished fourth after losing to the United Team of Germany in the bronze medal match, the best ever finish for Egypt at the Olympic football tournament (along with 1928).

== Honours ==
United Arab Republic

- African Cup of Nations: 3rd place, 1963
