= Ferenc Nógrádi =

Hungarian footballer (1940–2009)

Personal information
- Date of birth: 15 November 1940
- Place of birth: Kassa, Hungary
- Date of death: 16 May 2009 (aged 68)
- Position: Forward

Senior career*
Years	Team	Apps	(Gls)
1959–1966	Bp. Honvéd		

International career
1963–1965	Hungary	4	(0)
Medal record
Men's football
Representing Hungary
Olympic Games
Gold medal – first place	1964 Tokyo	Team competition
- * Club domestic league appearances and goals

Ferenc Nógrádi, born as Ferenc Neuwirth (15 November 1940 – 16 May 2009) was a former Hungarian footballer who played for Budapest Honvéd FC as a striker.

== Olympic career ==
Nógrádi won a gold medal with the Hungarian Olympic team at the 1964 Summer Olympics, at which he played in four out of five games.

== Honours ==
=== Club ===
- Hungarian Cup (1): 1964

=== Olympic ===
- Gold medal (1): 1964
