= Ivo Soares =

Brazilian footballer (born 1938)

Personal information
- Full name: Ivo Ribeiro Soares
- Date of birth: 16 December 1938 (age 87)
- Position: Midfielder

Senior career*
Years	Team	Apps	(Gls)
- Flamengo
- * Club domestic league appearances and goals

Ivo Ribeiro Soares (born 16 December 1938) is a Brazilian former footballer who competed in the 1964 Summer Olympics.
