= Benő Káposzta =

Hungarian footballer (1942–2025)

Personal information
- Date of birth: 7 June 1942
- Place of birth: Budapest, Hungary
- Date of death: 11 August 2025 (aged 83)
- Height: 1.77 m (5 ft 10 in)
- Position: Defender

Senior career*
| Years | Team | Apps | (Gls) |
| 1959–1974 | Újpesti Dózsa | 272 | (7) |
| Total | | 272 | (7) |

International career
| 1964–1969 | Hungary | 19 | (0) |
- * Club domestic league appearances and goals

Benő Káposzta (7 June 1942 – 11 August 2025) was a Hungarian footballer who played as a defender for Újpesti Dózsa. He made 19 appearances for the Hungary national team, also playing in the 1966 FIFA World Cup. Káposzta died on 11 August 2025, at the age of 83.
