= Aladim =

Brazilian footballer (born 1937)

Personal information
- Full name: Geraldo Teixeira
- Date of birth: 5 May 1937 (age 89)
- Place of birth: Natal, Rio Grande do Norte
- Date of death: -
- Position: Forward

Senior career*
Years	Team	Apps	(Gls)
- América de Natal
- São Cristóvão
- * Club domestic league appearances and goals

Geraldo Teixeira (born 5 May 1937), known as Aladim, is a Brazilian former footballer who played as a forward.
