= Ahmed Mostafa (footballer, born 1940) =

Egyptian footballer (1940–2022)

Personal information
- Full name: Ahmed Mostafa Gad
- Date of birth: 8 March 1940
- Place of birth: Zeitoun, Cairo, Egypt
- Date of death: 17 February 2022 (aged 81)
- Positions: Defender; midfielder

Youth career
- 1955–1958: Zamalek B

Senior career*
| Years | Team | Apps | (Gls) |
| 1958–1967 | Zamalek | | |

International career
- Egypt
Medal record
Men's Football
Representing United Arab Republic
Africa Cup of Nations
| Runner-up | 1962 Ethiopia |
- * Club domestic league appearances and goals

Ahmed Mostafa (Arabic: أحمد مصطفى; 8 March 1940 – 17 February 2022) was an Egyptian footballer who played as a defender and midfielder for Zamalek, he also played for the Egypt national team.

== International career ==
Mostafa represented Egypt (as United Arab Republic) in the 1962 African Cup of Nations and the 1964 Summer Olympics.

== Personal life and death ==
Mostafa died on 17 February 2022, at the age of 81.

== Honours ==
Zamalek

- Egyptian Premier League: 1959–60, 1963–64, 1964–65
- Egypt Cup: 1958–59, 1959–60, 1961–62

United Arab Republic

- African Cup of Nations: runner-up, 1962
