= Hélio Dias =

Brazilian footballer (born 1943)

Personal information
- Full name: Hélio Dias de Oliveira
- Date of birth: 19 December 1943 (age 82)
- Place of birth: Rio de Janeiro, Brazil
- Position: Goalkeeper

Youth career
- Bonsucesso
- Botafogo

Senior career*
Years	Team	Apps	(Gls)
1963–1965	Botafogo		
1966–1970	Atlético Mineiro		
1971–1978	Cruzeiro		
1979–1982	América Mineiro		

International career
1963–1964	Brazil Olympic	5	(0)
Medal record
Men's Football
Representing Brazil
Pan American Games
Gold medal – first place	1963 São Paulo
- * Club domestic league appearances and goals

Hélio Dias de Oliveira (born 19 December 1943) is a Brazilian former footballer.

== Club career ==
Born in Rio de Janeiro, Hélio Dias played for Bonsucesso and Botafogo in his youth. He became famous after arriving in Minas Gerais, where he played for Atlético Mineiro, where he made 121 appearances and was state champion in 1970, and for Cruzeiro, where he competed for position with Raul Plassmann for several years, and was part of the team that won the 1976 Copa Libertadores. He ended his career playing for América Mineiro.

== International career ==
Hélio Dias was part of the Brazil national team that competed in the 1963 Pan American Games, where the team won the gold medal, and in the 1964 Summer Olympics.

== Honours ==
Botafogo

- Torneio Rio-São Paulo: 1964

Atlético Mineiro

- Campeonato Mineiro: 1970

Cruzeiro

- Copa Libertadores: 1976
- Campeonato Mineiro: 1972, 1973, 1974, 1975, 1977
- Taça Minas Gerais: 1973

Brazil Olympic

- Pan American Games: 1963
