= Kim Sam-rak =

South Korean footballer (born 1940)

Personal information
- Date of birth: June 19, 1940 (age 86)
- Place of birth: South Korea
- Position: Midfielder

Senior career*
Years	Team	Apps	(Gls)
- Yangzee FC

International career
1964	South Korea		

Managerial career
- 1987: South Korea U-16
- 1992: South Korea U-23
- * Club domestic league appearances and goals

- Kim Sam-rak
- Hangul: 김삼락
- Hanja: 金三諾
- RR: Gim Samrak
- MR: Kim Samnak

Kim Sam-rak (Korean: 김삼락; born 19 June 1940) is a South Korean former footballer who competed in the 1964 Summer Olympics.

He was manager of South Korea national under-16 football team at 1987 FIFA U-16 World Championship and South Korea national under-23 football team at 1992 Summer Olympics.
