= Kim Young-bai =

South Korean footballer (born 1941)

- Hangul: 김영배
- Hanja: 金英培
- RR: Gim Yeongbae
- MR: Kim Yŏngbae

Kim Young-bai (born 10 January 1941) is a South Korean former footballer who competed in the 1964 Summer Olympics.
