= Carlos Alberto Bulla =

Argentine former footballer

Carlos Bulla
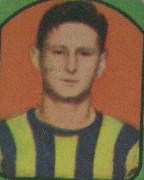

Personal information
- Full name: Carlos Alberto Bulla
- Date of birth: 6 October 1943 (age 83)
- Position: Forward

Senior career*
Years	Team	Apps	(Gls)
1963-1966	Rosario Central	20	(5)
1967	Platense	44	(11)
1968	Banfield	29	(16)
1969-1970	Club Atlético Platense	62	(35)
1971	Club Atlético River Plate	30	(2)
1972	Club Atlético Independiente	40	(5)
1973-1974	Gimnasia y Esgrima La Plata	28	(14)
- * Club domestic league appearances and goals

Carlos Alberto Bulla (born 6 October 1943) is an Argentine former footballer who competed in the 1964 Summer Olympics.

== Honours ==
- Copa Libertadores: 1972
