= Kim Duk-joong =

South Korean footballer (born 1940)

- Hangul: 김덕중
- Hanja: 金德中
- RR: Gim Deokjung
- MR: Kim Tŏkchung

Kim Duk-joong (born 29 April 1940) is a South Korean former footballer who competed in the 1964 Summer Olympics.
