= Riva (footballer) =

Brazilian footballer

Personal information
- Full name: Rivadávio Alves Pereira
- Date of birth: 4 May 1944 (age 82)
- Place of birth: Cambuci, Rio de Janeiro, Brazil
- Position: Defender

Senior career*
Years	Team	Apps	(Gls)
1962–1967	Fluminense		

International career
1963–1964	Brazil Olympic	5	(0)
Medal record
Men's Football
Representing Brazil
Pan American Games
Gold medal – first place	1963 São Paulo
- * Club domestic league appearances and goals

Rivadávio Alves Pereira (Note: This name uses Portuguese naming customs: the first or maternal family name is Alves and the second or paternal family name is Pereira.) (born 4 May 1944), known as Riva, is a Brazilian former footballer.

== Career ==
Defender, Riva played for Fluminense FC from 1962 to 1967.

== International career ==
Riva competed in the 1963 Pan American Games and the 1964 Summer Olympics.

== Honours ==
Fluminense

- Taça Guanabara: 1966

Brazil Olympic

- Pan American Games: 1963
