= Valdez (Brazilian footballer) =

Brazilian footballer

Personal information
- Full name: Valdez Quirino Lemos
- Date of birth: 10 February 1943 (age 83)
- Position: Defender

Senior career*
Years	Team	Apps	(Gls)
- Fluminense
- * Club domestic league appearances and goals

Valdez Quirino Lemos (born 10 February 1943) is a Brazilian former footballer who competed in the 1964 Summer Olympics.
