= Adevaldo =

Brazilian footballer (born 1943)

Personal information
- Full name: Adevaldo Virgílio Netto
- Date of birth: 16 August 1943 (age 83)
- Place of birth: Leopoldina, Brazil
- Position: Defender

Senior career*
Years	Team	Apps	(Gls)
1962–1966	Botafogo		
1966	São Paulo		
1967	Santa Cruz		
1968–1972	Bahia		
1972–1975	CRB		
1975	Itabaiana		

International career
1963–1964	Brazil Olympic	10	(0)
Medal record
Men's Football
Representing Brazil
Pan American Games
Gold medal – first place	1963 São Paulo
- * Club domestic league appearances and goals

Adevaldo Virgílio Netto (Note: This name uses Portuguese naming customs: the first or maternal family name is Virgílio and the second or paternal family name is Netto.) (born 16 August 1943) is a Brazilian former footballer who played as a defender.

== Club career ==
Adevaldo began his career at Botafogo and also played for São Paulo, Santa Cruz, Bahia, CRB and teams from Sergipe.

== International career ==
Adevaldo competed in the 1963 Pan American Games and the 1964 Summer Olympics.
