= Lee Woo-bong =

South Korean footballer

- Hangul: 이우봉
- Hanja: 李偶奉
- RR: I Ubong
- MR: I Ubong

Lee Woo-bong (born 8 June 1935) is a South Korean former footballer who competed in the 1964 Summer Olympics.
