= Humberto (footballer, born 1945) =

Brazilian footballer

Personal information
- Full name: Humberto André Redes Filho
- Date of birth: 20 June 1945 (age 81)
- Position: Forward

Senior career*
Years	Team	Apps	(Gls)
- Botafogo
- * Club domestic league appearances and goals

Humberto André Redes Filho (born 20 June 1945) is a Brazilian former footballer who competed in the 1964 Summer Olympics.
