= Chung Yeong-hwan =

South Korean footballer

- Hangul: 정영환
- Hanja: 鄭永煥
- RR: Jeong Yeonghwan
- MR: Chŏng Yŏnghwan

Chung Yeong-hwan (born 7 December 1938) is a South Korean former footballer.
