= Nélio (footballer, born 1943) =

Brazilian footballer

Personal information
- Full name: Nélio dos Santos Pereira
- Date of birth: 8 December 1943 (age 82)
- Date of death: 23 August 2023
- Position: Forward

Senior career*
Years	Team	Apps	(Gls)
- Fluminense
1967	Baltimore Bays	16	(3)
- * Club domestic league appearances and goals

Nélio dos Santos Pereira (born 8 December 1943) is a Brazilian former footballer. He played one season with the Baltimore Bays of the National Professional Soccer League.
