= Yoo Kwang-joon =

South Korean footballer

- Hangul: 유광준
- Hanja: 兪光浚
- RR: Yu Gwangjun
- MR: Yu Kwangjun

Yoo Kwang-joon (born 7 March 1932) is a South Korean former footballer.
