= Sándor Katona (footballer) =

Hungarian footballer (1943–2009)

Medal record

Men's football

Representing Hungary

Olympic Games
Gold medal – first place	1964 Tokyo	Team competition

Sándor Katona (21 February 1943 in Budapest – 16 May 2009 in Budapest) was a Hungarian footballer. He won a gold medal in the 1964 Summer Olympics in Tokyo.
