= Tito (footballer, born 1943) =

Brazilian footballer

Personal information
- Full name: Nílton Rosa
- Date of birth: 15 March 1943 (age 83)
- Position: Forward

Senior career*
Years	Team	Apps	(Gls)
- Fluminense
- * Club domestic league appearances and goals

Nílton Rosa (born 15 March 1943) is a Brazilian former footballer.
