= Kim Chan-ki =

South Korean footballer

Personal information
- Date of birth: 30 December 1931
- Place of birth: Seoul
- Date of death: 1 February 2011 (aged 79)

Youth career
- Kyung Hee University

Senior career*
Years	Team	Apps	(Gls)
- Korea Coal FC
Medal record
Representing South Korea
Men's football
AFC Asian Cup
Gold medal – first place	1960 South Korea	Team
- * Club domestic league appearances and goals

- Kim Chan-ki
- Hangul: 김찬기
- Hanja: 金燦基
- RR: Gim Changi
- MR: Kim Ch'an'gi

Kim Chan-ki (30 December 1931 – 1 February 2011) was a South Korean footballer.
