= Farouk Mahmoud =

Egyptian footballer (born 1944)

Personal information
- Date of birth: 18 October 1944 (age 82)
- Position: Forward

Senior career*
Years	Team	Apps	(Gls)
- Zamalek

International career
- Egypt
- * Club domestic league appearances and goals

Farouk Mahmoud (born 18 October 1944) is an Egyptian former footballer. He competed in the men's tournament at the 1964 Summer Olympics.
