= Klaus-Dieter Seehaus =

German footballer (1942–1996)

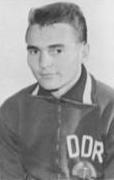
- Seehaus, 1964

Personal information
- Date of birth: 6 October 1942
- Place of birth: Hagen, Germany
- Date of death: 10 February 1996 (aged 53)
- Place of death: Rostock, Germany
- Position: Midfielder

International career
Years	Team	Apps	(Gls)
1964	Germany		
Medal record
Men's football
Representing Germany
Olympic Games
Bronze medal – third place	1964 Tokyo	Team competition

Klaus-Dieter Seehaus (6 October 1942 in Hagen – 10 February 1996 in Rostock) was a German footballer who played as a midfielder and competed in the 1964 Summer Olympics.
