= Ahmed Mohamed Reda =

Egyptian footballer (born 1939)

Personal information
- Date of birth: 9 November 1939 (age 86)
- Place of birth: Cairo, Egypt

International career
Years	Team	Apps	(Gls)
- Egypt
Medal record
Men's Football
Representing United Arab Republic
Africa Cup of Nations
Third place	1963 Ghana

Ahmed Mohamed Reda (born 9 November 1939) is an Egyptian footballer. He competed in the men's tournament at the 1964 Summer Olympics.

== Honours ==
United Arab Republic

- African Cup of Nations: 3rd place, 1963
