= Íris (footballer) =

Brazilian footballer

Personal information
- Full name: Íris Pereira de Souza
- Date of birth: 12 February 1942 (age 84)
- Place of birth: Itapitanga, Bahia, Brazil
- Position: Midfielder

Senior career*
Years	Team	Apps	(Gls)
- Fluminense
Medal record
Men's Football
Representing Brazil
Pan American Games
Gold medal – first place	1963 São Paulo
- * Club domestic league appearances and goals

Íris Pereira de Souza (born 12 February 1945), known as just Íris, is a Brazilian former footballer.
