= Mura (footballer) =

Brazilian footballer

Personal information
- Full name: Maurício Pereira Barros
- Date of birth: 4 February 1944 (age 82)
- Position: Defender

Senior career*
Years	Team	Apps	(Gls)
- Botafogo
- * Club domestic league appearances and goals

Maurício Pereira Barros (born 4 February 1944), known as Mura, is a Brazilian former footballer who competed in the 1964 Summer Olympics.
