= Mimi Darwish =

Egyptian footballer (1942-2011)

Personal information
- Full name: Amin Darwish
- Date of birth: 20 March 1942
- Place of birth: Ismaïlia, Egypt
- Date of death: 11 December 2011 (aged 69)
- Position: Defender

Senior career*
Years	Team	Apps	(Gls)
- Ismaily SC

International career
- Egypt
Medal record
Men's Football
Representing United Arab Republic
Africa Cup of Nations
Third place	1963 Ghana
Third place	1970 Sudan
- * Club domestic league appearances and goals

Amin "Mimi" Darwish (Arabic: أمين درويش) (20 March 1942 – 11 December 2011) was an Egyptian footballer. He competed for Egypt at the 1964 Summer Olympics.

== Honours ==
United Arab Republic

- African Cup of Nations: 3rd place, 1963, 1970

== See also ==
- Football at the 1964 Summer Olympics
