= Ademar Caravetti =

Brazilian footballer (born 1945)

Personal information
- Full name: Ademar Francisco Caravetti
- Date of birth: 4 February 1945 (age 81)
- Position: Forward

Senior career*
Years	Team	Apps	(Gls)
- Palmeiras
- * Club domestic league appearances and goals

Ademar Francisco Caravetti (born 4 February 1945) is a Brazilian former footballer who competed in the 1964 Summer Olympics.
