= Kim Jung-suk =

South Korean footballer and coach

Personal information
- Full name: Kim Jung-suk
- Date of birth: 1 October 1939
- Place of birth: Korea, Empire of Japan
- Position: Right-back

Youth career
- Paichai High School

College career
Years	Team	Apps	(Gls)
1959–1961	Korea University		
1964	Korea University		

Senior career*
Years	Team	Apps	(Gls)
1962–1963	ROK Army CIC		
1965–1968	Korea Tungsten		
1969	Korea Trust Bank		

International career
1959	South Korea U20		
1961–1964	South Korea B		
1959–1969	South Korea	56	(0)
Medal record
Men's football
Representing South Korea
AFC Asian Cup
Bronze medal – third place	1964 Israel
AFC Youth Championship
Winner	1959 Malaya
- * Club domestic league appearances and goals

- Kim Jung-suk
- Hangul: 김정석
- Hanja: 金禎錫
- RR: Gim Jeongseok
- MR: Kim Chŏngsŏk

Kim Jung-suk (born 1 October 1939) is a South Korean former footballer who competed in the 1964 Summer Olympics.

== Honours ==
Korea Tungsten

- Korean National Semipro League (Spring): 1965, 1968
- Korean National Semipro League (Autumn): 1965, 1966
- Korean National Championship runner-up: 1968
- Korean President's Cup: 1965, 1966

South Korea U20

- AFC Youth Championship: 1959

South Korea B

- AFC Asian Cup third place: 1964

Individual

- Korean President's Cup Best Player: 1965
- AFC Asian All-Star: 1965, 1966, 1967, 1968
