= Zé Luiz (footballer, born 1943) =

Brazilian footballer

Personal information
- Full name: José Luiz Pereira
- Date of birth: 5 July 1943 (age 83)
- Position: Defender

Senior career*
Years	Team	Apps	(Gls)
- Fluminense
- * Club domestic league appearances and goals

José Luiz Pereira (born 5 July 1943) is a Brazilian former footballer who competed in the 1964 Summer Olympics.
