= František Schmucker =

Czech footballer

Personal information
- Full name: František Schmucker
- Date of birth: 28 January 1940
- Place of birth: Horvátjárfalu, Hungary
- Date of death: 15 July 2004 (aged 64)
- Place of death: Ostrava, Czech Republic
- Position: Goalkeeper

Youth career
- 1952–1955: JRD Jarovce
- 1955–1959: ŠK Slovan Bratislava

Senior career*
Years	Team	Apps	(Gls)
1959–1965	Spartak ZJŠ Brno	139	(0)
1965–1979	Baník Ostrava	161	(0)
Total		300	(0)

International career
1962–1970	Czechoslovakia	2	(0)
Medal record
Men's football
Representing Czechoslovakia
FIFA World Cup
Runner-up	1962 Chile
Olympic Games
Silver medal – second place	1964 Tokyo
- * Club domestic league appearances and goals

František Schmucker (28 January 1940 in Horvátjárfalu, Hungary – 15 July 2004 in Ostrava) was a Czech football player.

During his club career he played for FC Baník Ostrava and RH Brno. He earned 2 caps for the Czechoslovakia national football team, and was part of the second-placed team at the 1962 FIFA World Cup, and also won a silver medal in Football at the 1964 Summer Olympics.
