= Štefan Matlák =

Slovak footballer

Medal record

Men's football

Representing Czechoslovakia

Olympic Games
Silver medal – second place	1964 Tokyo	Team competition

Štefan Matlák (6 February 1934 in Bratislava – 12 April 2003 in Bratislava) was a Slovak football player who competed in the 1964 Summer Olympics.
