= Zdeněk Pičman =

Czech footballer (1933–2014)

Personal information
- Full name: Zdeněk Pičman
- Date of birth: 23 January 1933
- Place of birth: Příbram, Czechoslovakia
- Date of death: 6 July 2014 (aged 81)
- Place of death: Třebihošť, Czech Republic

Youth career
- Slavia Karlovy Vary

Senior career*
Years	Team	Apps	(Gls)
1955	Dynamo Praha		
1956–1968	Spartak Hradec Králové	296	(20)

International career
1964	Czechoslovakia	1	(0)
Medal record
Men's football
Representing Czechoslovakia
Olympic Games
Silver medal – second place	1964 Tokyo	Team competition
- * Club domestic league appearances and goals

Zdeněk Pičman (23 January 1933 – 6 July 2014) was a Czech football player who competed in the 1964 Summer Olympics. He was born in Příbram.
