= Ján Geleta =

Slovak footballer

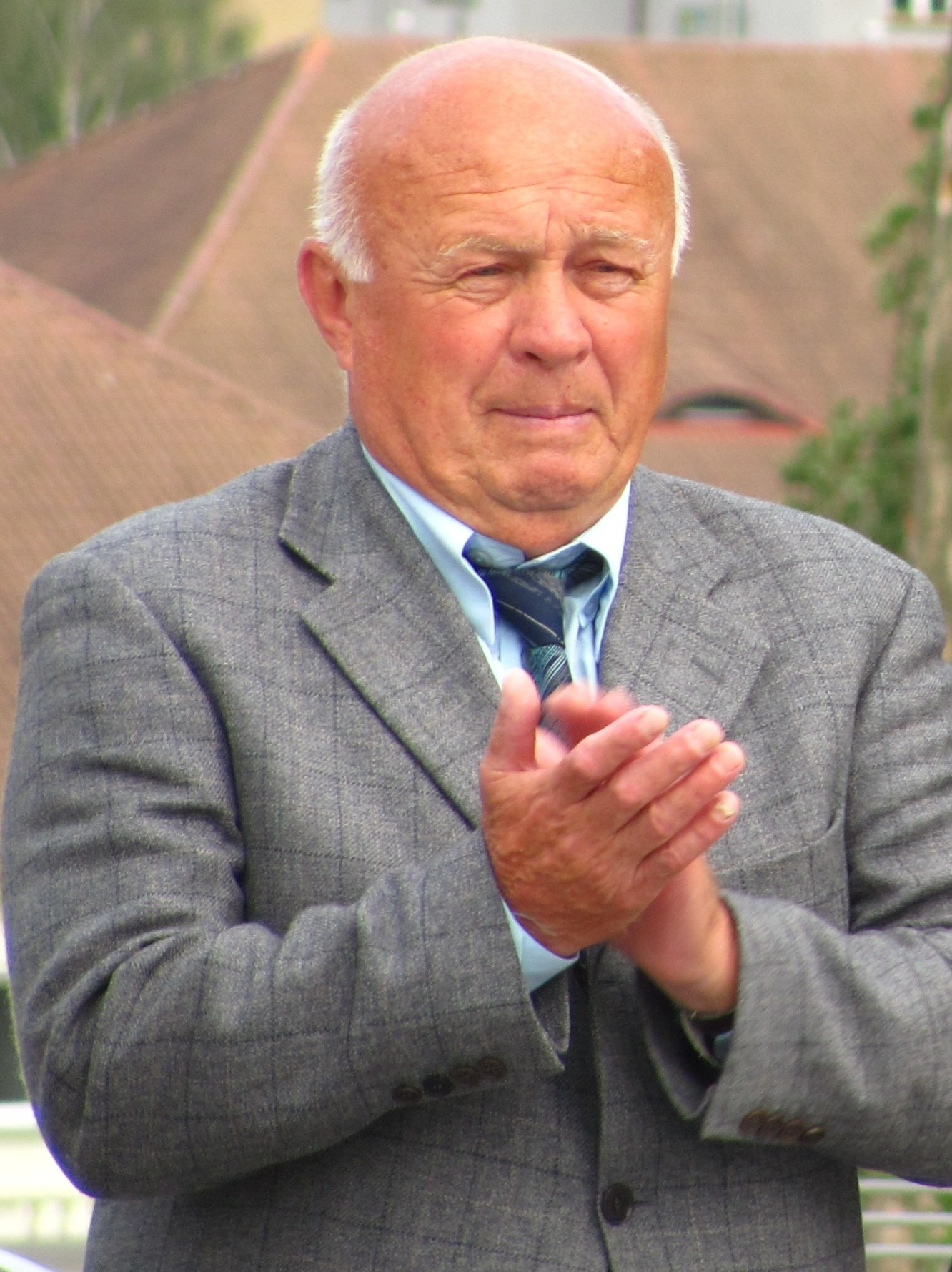
- Ján Geleta in 2012

Personal information
- Date of birth: 13 September 1943 (age 83)
- Place of birth: Partizánske, Slovakia
- Position: Midfielder

Youth career
- 1958–1963: Iskra Partizánske

Senior career*
Years	Team	Apps	(Gls)
1963–1976	Dukla Prague	283	(27)
1977–1979	Motorlet Prague		

International career
1964–1970	Czechoslovakia	19	(2)
Medal record
Men's football
Representing Czechoslovakia
Olympic Games
Silver medal – second place	1964 Tokyo	Team competition
- * Club domestic league appearances and goals

Ján Geleta (born 13 September 1943) is a former Slovak football player.

Geleta played his whole professional league career for Dukla Prague. He appeared in 283 league matches and scored 27 goals. Geleta was initially at Dukla to serve his two-year military service. After finishing his military duties, he stayed at the club and played there until 1976.

Geleta won the Czechoslovak First League twice with Dukla, in 1964 and 1966. He also won the Czechoslovak Cup with Dukla in 1965, 1966 and 1969. In 1967, he was voted the Czechoslovak Footballer of the Year.

Geleta was a member of the Czechoslovakia national football team and played for his country total 19 matches, scoring two goals. He also participated in the 1964 Summer Olympics in Tokyo, where the Czechoslovak team won the silver medals.
