= Karel Nepomucký =

Czech footballer

Personal information
- Full name: Karel Nepomucký
- Date of birth: 20 July 1939 (age 87)
- Place of birth: Prague, Protectorate of Bohemia and Moravia

Senior career*
Years	Team	Apps	(Gls)
1956–1957	Dynamo Prague		
1958–1959	Dukla Pardubice		
1960–1969	SK Slavia Prague		

International career
1964	Czechoslovakia	1	(0)
Medal record
Men's football
Representing Czechoslovakia
Olympic Games
Silver medal – second place	1964 Tokyo	Team competition
- * Club domestic league appearances and goals

Karel Nepomucký (born 20 July 1939 in Prague) is a Czech former football player who competed in the 1964 Summer Olympics.
