= Lee Yi-woo =

Olympic footballer (born 1941)

- Hangul: 이이우
- Hanja: 李二雨
- RR: I Iu
- MR: I Iu

Lee Yi-woo (born 18 February 1941) is a South Korean former footballer who competed in the 1964 Summer Olympics.
