= František Valošek =

Czech footballer (1937–2023)

Personal information
- Date of birth: 12 July 1937
- Place of birth: Frýdek-Místek, Czechoslovakia
- Date of death: 31 July 2023 (aged 86)
- Place of death: Ostrava, Czech Republic
- Height: 1.66 m (5 ft 5 in)
- Position: Forward

Senior career*
Years	Team	Apps	(Gls)
1959–1966	Baník Ostrava	150	(54)

International career
1961–1965	Czechoslovakia	6	(0)
- Czechoslovakia Olympic
Medal record
Men's football
Representing Czechoslovakia
Olympic Games
Silver medal – second place	1964 Tokyo	Team competition
- * Club domestic league appearances and goals

František Valošek (12 July 1937 – 31 July 2023) was a Czech football player who competed in the 1964 Summer Olympics. He was born in Frýdek-Místek, and played club football in the 1950s and '60s for Baník Ostrava, for whom he scored 54 goals in 150 appearances. Valošek died in Ostrava on 31 July 2023, at the age of 86.
