= Eliseu (footballer, born 1945) =

Brazilian footballer

Eliseu Antônio Vinagre Ferreira de Godoy (born 17 October 1945), simply known as Eliseu, is a Brazilian former footballer who played as a midfielder. He represented Brazil at the 1964 Summer Olympics in Tokyo and also competed in European professional football.

== Early life ==
Eliseu was born in Brazil on 17 October 1945. He developed his football skills during the 1960s, a period of significant growth for Brazilian football on the international stage.

== Career ==
=== Club career ===
Eliseu began his professional football career at Santos FC in Brazil, where he established himself as a midfielder with strong technical abilities. In the late 1960s, he transferred to European football, joining Os Belenenses, a Portuguese club based in Lisbon.

=== International career ===
Eliseu represented Brazil at the 1964 Summer Olympics held in Tokyo, Japan.
