= Karel Knesl =

Czech footballer (1942–2020)

Personal information
- Full name: Karel Knesl
- Date of birth: 8 April 1942
- Place of birth: Pustiměř
- Date of death: 3 September 2020 (aged 78)
- Place of death: Prague

Youth career
- 1955–1961: TJ Gottwaldov

Senior career*
Years	Team	Apps	(Gls)
1962–1965	Dukla Prague	33	(0)
1966–1970	SK Slavia Prague	68	(5)
1970–1971	Škoda Plzeň	30	(0)
Total		131	(5)

International career
1966	Czechoslovakia	1	(0)
Medal record
Men's football
Representing Czechoslovakia
Olympic Games
Silver medal – second place	1964 Tokyo	Team competition
- * Club domestic league appearances and goals

Karel Knesl (8 April 1942 – 3 September 2020) was a Czech football player who competed in the 1964 Summer Olympics.

Knesl died in Prague on 3 September 2020, at the age of 78.
