= Amin El-Esnawi =

Egyptian footballer (1936-2006)

Personal information
- Date of birth: 23 June 1936
- Place of birth: Suez, Egypt
- Date of death: 27 May 2006 (aged 69)
- Place of death: Suez, Egypt
- Position: Defender

International career
Years	Team	Apps	(Gls)
- Egypt
Medal record
Men's Football
Representing United Arab Republic
Africa Cup of Nations
Runner-up	1962 Ethiopia
Third place	1963 Ghana

Amin El-Esnawi (23 June 1936 – 28 May 2006) was an Egyptian footballer. He competed at the 1960 Summer Olympics and the 1964 Summer Olympics.

== Honours ==
United Arab Republic

- African Cup of Nations: runner-up, 1962; 3rd place, 1963
