= Anton Urban =

Slovak footballer (1934–2021)

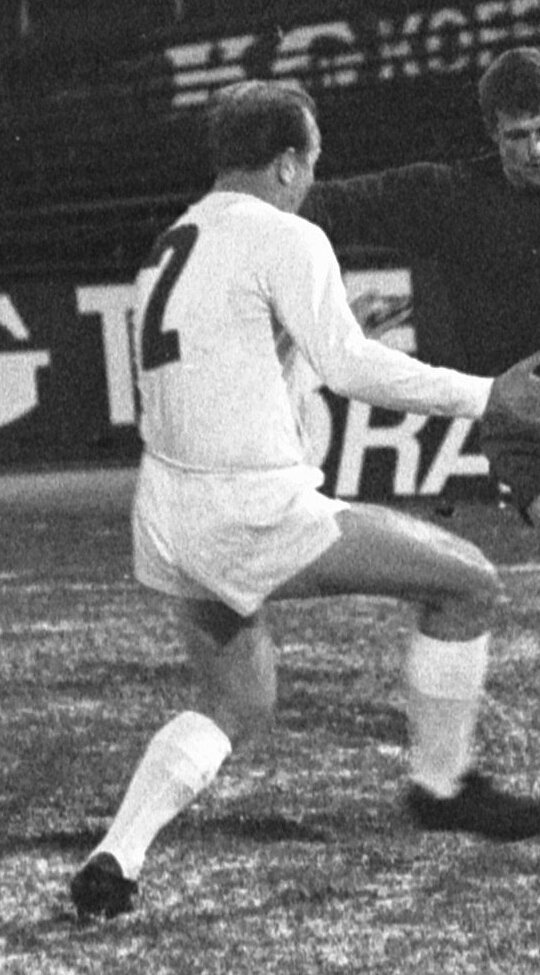
- Urban with Slovan Bratislava in 1967

Personal information
- Date of birth: 16 January 1934
- Place of birth: Kysak, Czechoslovakia
- Date of death: 5 March 2021 (aged 87)
- Height: 1.75 m (5 ft 9 in)
- Position: Defender

Senior career*
| Years | Team | Apps | (Gls) |
| 1953–1968 | Slovan Bratislava | | |
| 1968–1969 | Wacker Innsbruck | | |

Managerial career
- –1981: ZŤS Petržalka
- 1981: Slovan Bratislava
Medal record
Men's football
Representing Czechoslovakia
Olympic Games
| Silver medal – second place | 1964 Tokyo | Team competition |
- * Club domestic league appearances and goals

Anton Urban (16 January 1934 – 5 March 2021) was a Slovak footballer who played as a defender for Slovan Bratislava. He was the captain of the Czechoslovak silver medal-winning team at the 1964 Summer Olympics in Tokyo. He won the Czechoslovak Cup on three occasions.
