= Vojtech Masný =

Slovak footballer

Personal information
- Date of birth: 8 July 1938 (age 88)
- Place of birth: Chynorany, Czechoslovakia
- Position: Striker

Senior career*
Years	Team	Apps	(Gls)
1958–1960	Dukla Pardubice		
1960–1969	Jednota Trenčín		
1969–1972	First Vienna		
1975–1976	Jednota Trenčín		

International career
1964–1967	Czechoslovakia	9	(3)
Medal record
Men's football
Representing Czechoslovakia
Olympic Games
Silver medal – second place	1964 Tokyo	Team competition
- * Club domestic league appearances and goals

Vojtech Masný (born 8 July 1938) is a former Slovak football player.

In Czechoslovak First League he appeared in 243 league matches and scored 71 goals. He played 9 matches and scored 3 goals for Czechoslovakia national football team. Masný also participated in the 1964 Summer Olympics in Tokyo, where Czechoslovakia won the silver medals. His younger brother Marián Masný represented Czechoslovakia as well.
