= Ali Kamal Etman =

Egyptian footballer (1941–2020)

Personal information
- Date of birth: 6 June 1941
- Date of death: 18 June 2020 (aged 79)
- Position: Forward

International career
Years	Team	Apps	(Gls)
- Egypt

Ali Kamal Etman (6 June 1941 – 18 June 2020) was an Egyptian footballer. He competed in the men's tournament at the 1964 Summer Olympics.
