= František Knebort =

Czech footballer

Personal information
- Full name: František Knebort
- Date of birth: 19 January 1944 (age 82)
- Place of birth: Prague, Protectorate of Bohemia and Moravia

Youth career
- 1952–1962: Slavoj Vyšehrad

Senior career*
Years	Team	Apps	(Gls)
1961–1963	ČKD Praha	43	(24)
1963	FK Dukla Prague		
1964–1965	Bohemians Praha	33	(11)
1965–1968	FK Dukla Prague		
1969–1970	SK Slavia Prague	42	(5)
1970–1972	Sklo Union Teplice		
1972–1975	Bohemians Praha		
1975–1983	Tatra Smíchov		

International career
1965	Czechoslovakia	2	(3)
Medal record
Men's football
Representing Czechoslovakia
Olympic Games
Silver medal – second place	1964 Tokyo	Team competition
- * Club domestic league appearances and goals

František Knebort (born 19 January 1944) is a Czech former football player who competed in the 1964 Summer Olympics.
