= Khalil Mohamed Shahin =

Egyptian footballer (1942-2017)

Personal information
- Date of birth: 2 March 1942
- Place of birth: Port Said, Egypt
- Date of death: 6 May 2017 (aged 75)
- Position: Midfielder

Senior career*
Years	Team	Apps	(Gls)
1958–1973	Al Masry		

International career
- Egypt

Managerial career
- 1987–?: Port Fuad
- 1990–?: Al Masry
- * Club domestic league appearances and goals

Khalil Mohamed Shahin (2 March 1942 – 6 May 2017) was an Egyptian footballer. He competed in the men's tournament at the 1964 Summer Olympics.
