= Florisvaldo (footballer) =

Brazilian footballer (born 1943)

Personal information
- Full name: Florisvaldo Pinto Júnior
- Date of birth: 9 May 1943 (age 83)
- Position: Goalkeeper

Senior career*
Years	Team	Apps	(Gls)
1959	Olaria		
1960-1964	Botafogo		
1960-1964	Remo		

International career
1964	Brazil under-23		
- * Club domestic league appearances and goals

Florisvaldo Pinto Júnior (born 9 May 1943) is a Brazilian former footballer.
