= Fathi Khorshid =

Egyptian footballer (1937–2018)

Personal information
- Date of birth: 11 December 1937
- Place of birth: El Mahalla El Kubra, Egypt
- Date of death: 15 June 2018 (aged 80)
- Position: Goalkeeper

International career
Years	Team	Apps	(Gls)
- Egypt
Medal record
Men's Football
Representing United Arab Republic
Africa Cup of Nations
Third place	1963 Ghana

Fathi Ali Khorshid (11 December 1937 – 15 June 2018) was an Egyptian footballer. He competed at the 1960 Summer Olympics and the 1964 Summer Olympics.

== Honours ==
United Arab Republic

- African Cup of Nations: 3rd place, 1963
