= Mohamed Seddik =

Egyptian footballer (1940–1996)

Shehta
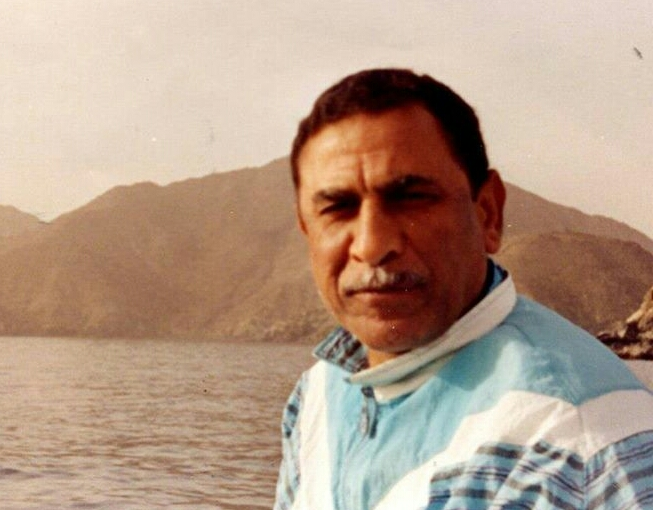
- 2013

Personal information
- Date of birth: 14 April 1940
- Place of birth: Al-Ismailiyah, Egypt
- Date of death: 5 July 1996 (aged 56)

International career
Years	Team	Apps	(Gls)
- Egypt
Medal record
Men's Football
Representing United Arab Republic
Africa Cup of Nations
Runner-up	1962 Ethiopia

Mohamed Seddik, better known as Shehta (14 April 1940 – 5 July 1996) was an Egyptian football manager and former player. He competed with Egypt in the men's tournament at the 1964 Summer Olympics.

== Honours ==
United Arab Republic

- African Cup of Nations: runner-up, 1962
