= Football at the 1964 Summer Olympics =

Coordinates: 35.6781°N 139.7147°E

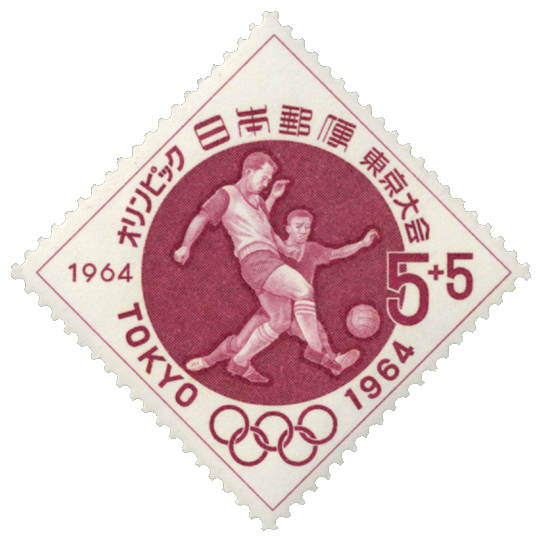
- Football at the 1964 Olympics on a stamp of Japan

Tournament details
- Host country: Japan
- Dates: 11–23 October 1964
- Teams: 14 (from 5 confederations)
- Venues: 8 (in 4 host cities)

Final positions
- Champions: Hungary (2nd title)
- Runners-up: Czechoslovakia
- Third place: United Team of Germany
- Fourth place: Egypt

Tournament statistics
- Matches played: 29
- Goals scored: 123 (4.24 per match)
- Top scorer: (Hungary) Ferenc Bene (12 goals)

The football competition at the 1964 Summer Olympics started on 11 October and ended on 23 October. Only one event, the men's tournament, was contested. The tournament features 14 men's national teams from six continental confederations. The 14 teams are drawn into two groups of four and two groups of three and each group plays a round-robin tournament. At the end of the group stage, the top two teams advanced to the knockout stage, beginning with the quarter-finals and culminating with the gold medal match at the Olympic Stadium on 23 October 1964. There was also three consolation matches played by losing quarter-finalists. The winner of these matches placed fifth in the tournament.

== Qualification ==
Regional qualifying tournaments were held. During the CONMEBOL Pre-Olympic Tournament among South American national teams, a riot in Lima during the decisive Peru–Argentina match, after Peru's equalizing goal in the last minutes was disallowed by the referee, resulted in 328 deaths, which was considered the worst football disaster in history. Due to the riot, further CONMEBOL matches were not played that year, except for a playoff between Brazil and Peru (won by Brazil), and Argentina qualified instead of Peru.

16 teams qualified, and were divided into four groups:

- Group A (United Team of Germany (which was de facto East Germany), Romania, Mexico, Iran)
- Group B (Hungary, Yugoslavia, Morocco, ~~Korea D.P.R.~~)
- Group C (Czechoslovakia, United Arab Republic (Egypt), Brazil, Korea Rep.)
- Group D (Japan, Ghana, Argentina, ~~Italy~~)

The two best teams of each group competed in the quarter-finals.

Ultimately, the tournament was played two teams short:

- Italy were disqualified as their team was not amateur; Poland, who Italy had beaten to qualify, declined to take Italy's place due to a lack of preparation time.
- North Korea withdrew from the entire Games before the Opening Ceremony after Japanese immigration officials refused six of their athletes entry.

Africa (3)

- Ghana
- Morocco
- United Arab Republic

Asia (4)

- Iran
- Japan (hosts)
- ~~North Korea~~
- South Korea

Europe (6)

- Czechoslovakia
- East Germany
- Hungary
- ~~Italy~~
- Romania
- Yugoslavia (holders)

North America (1)

- Mexico

South America (2)

- Argentina
- Brazil

== Venues ==
Tokyo
Prince Chichibu Football Field (1)	National Olympic Stadium (2)	Komazawa Olympic Park Stadium (3)
Capacity: 17,569	Capacity: 71,556	Capacity: 20,780
Saitama		
Ōmiya Football Field (4)
Capacity: 14,392
Yokohama
Mitsuzawa Football Field (5)
Capacity: 10,102

== Medalists ==
Gold	Silver	Bronze
Hungary	Czechoslovakia	United Team of Germany
Ferenc Bene; Tibor Csernai; János Farkas; József Gelei; Kálmán Ihász; Sándor Katona; Imre Komora; Ferenc Nógrádi; Dezső Novák; Árpád Orbán; Károly Palotai; Antal Szentmihályi; Gusztáv Szepesi; Zoltán Varga	Jan Brumovský; Ludovít Cvetler; Ján Geleta; František Knebort; Karel Knesl; Karel Lichtnégl; Vojtech Masný; Štefan Matlák; Ivan Mráz; Karel Nepomucký; Zdeněk Pičman; František Schmucker; Anton Švajlen; Anton Urban; František Valošek; Josef Vojta; Vladimír Weiss	Gerd Backhaus; Wolfgang Barthels; Bernd Bauchspieß; Gerhard Körner; Otto Fräßdorf; Henning Frenzel; Dieter Engelhardt; Herbert Pankau; Manfred Geisler; Jürgen Heinsch; Klaus Lisiewicz; Jürgen Nöldner; Peter Rock; Klaus-Dieter Seehaus; Hermann Stöcker; Werner Unger; Klaus Urbanczyk; Eberhard Vogel; Manfred Walter; Horst Weigang

Note: Only players from the East Germany represented the joint Olympic team of United Team of Germany.

== First round ==
=== Group A ===
Pos	Team	Pld	W	D	L	GF	GA	GD	Pts	Qualification
1	United Team of Germany	3	2	1	0	7	1	+6	5	Advanced to knockout stage
2	Romania	3	2	1	0	5	2	+3	5	Advanced to knockout stage
3	Mexico	3	0	1	2	2	6	−4	1	
4	Iran	3	0	1	2	1	6	−5	1	

Source: RSSSF
11 October 1964
15:00

United Team of Germany	4–0	Iran
Bauchspiess 7'; Vogel 20', 63'; Frenzel 44'	Report

Mitsuzawa Stadium, Yokohama
Attendance: 12,671
Referee: Eunápio de Queiroz (Brazil)
11 October 1964
15:00

Romania	3–1	Mexico
Creiniceanu 20'; Pârcălab 33'; Ionescu 47'	Report	Fragoso 73'

Omiya Ground, Saitama
Attendance: 12,932
Referee: Yozo Yokoyama (Japan)

13 October 1964
15:00

United Team of Germany	1–1	Romania
Frenzel 22'	Report	Pavlovici 27'

Komazawa Olympic Park Stadium, Tokyo
Attendance: 18,970
Referee: Václav Korelusz (Czechoslovakia)
13 October 1964
15:00

Iran	1–1	Mexico
Nirlou 59'	Report	González 54'

Chichibu Stadium, Tokyo
Attendance: 15,938
Referee: John Stanley Wontumi (Ghana)

15 October 1964
15:00

United Team of Germany	2–0	Mexico
Barthels 37'; Nöldner 66'	Report

Mitsuzawa Stadium, Yokohama
Attendance: 12,814
Referee: Gregg de Silva (Malaysia)
15 October 1964
15:00

Romania	1–0	Iran
Pavlovici 26'	Report

Omiya Ground, Saitama
Attendance: 13,026
Referee: Miguel Comesaña (Argentina)

=== Group B ===
Pos	Team	Pld	W	D	L	GF	GA	GD	Pts	Qualification
1	Hungary	2	2	0	0	12	5	+7	4	Advanced to knockout stage
2	Yugoslavia	2	1	0	1	8	7	+1	2	Advanced to knockout stage
3	Morocco	2	0	0	2	1	9	−8	0	
4	North Korea	0	0	0	0	0	0	0	0	Withdrew

Source: RSSSF
11 October 1964
15:00

Hungary	6–0	Morocco
Bene 13', 38' (pen.), 70', 74', 78', 87'	Report

National Olympic Stadium, Tokyo
Attendance: 65,793
Referee: Kim Duk-chun (South Korea)

13 October 1964
15:00

Yugoslavia	3–1	Morocco
Samardžić 8'; Belin 12', 59'	Report	Bouachra 2'

Mitsuzawa Soccer Stadium, Yokohama
Attendance: 12,765
Referee: Hussein Imam (United Arab Emirates)

15 October 1964
15:00

Yugoslavia	5–6	Hungary
Osim 1', 82'; Belin 12', 35'; Zambata 31'	Report	Csernai 5', 11', 44', 63' (pen.); Farkas 18'; Bene 25' (pen.)

Komazawa Olympic Park Stadium, Tokyo
Attendance: 19,316
Referee: Genishi Fukushima (Japan)

=== Group C ===
Pos	Team	Pld	W	D	L	GF	GA	GD	Pts	Qualification
1	Czechoslovakia	3	3	0	0	12	2	+10	6	Advanced to knockout stage
2	United Arab Republic	3	1	1	1	12	6	+6	3	Advanced to knockout stage
3	Brazil	3	1	1	1	5	2	+3	3	
4	South Korea	3	0	0	3	1	20	−19	0	

Source: RSSSF
12 October 1964
15:00

Czechoslovakia	6–1	South Korea
Lichtnégl 25'; Vojta 26'; Mráz 32', 68'; Masný 43', 71'	Report	Lee Yi-woo 59'

Omiya Park Soccer Stadium, Saitama
Attendance: 12,943
Referee: Rafael Valenzuela (Mexico)
12 October 1964
15:00

Brazil	1–1	United Arab Republic
Roberto 10'	Report	Shanin 88'

Komazawa Olympic Park Stadium, Tokyo
Attendance: 16,450
Referee: Rudi Glöckner (Germany)

14 October 1964
15:00

Czechoslovakia	5–1	United Arab Republic
Vojta 5', 27'; Urban 36'; Mráz 83'; Cvetler 84'	Report	Riad 53'

Chichibunomiya Rugby Stadium, Tokyo
Attendance: 15,903
Referee: István Zsolt (Hungary)
14 October 1964
15:00

Brazil	4–0	South Korea
Zé Roberto 30'; Elizeu 44', 54'; Roberto 73'	Report

Mitsuzawa Soccer Stadium, Yokohama
Attendance: 12,672
Referee: Salih Mohamed Boukkili (Morocco)

16 October 1964
15:00

Czechoslovakia	1–0	Brazil
Valošek 77'	Report

Omiya Park Soccer Stadium, Saitama
Attendance: 13,120
Referee: Hussein Tehrani (Iran)
16 October 1964
15:00

United Arab Republic	10–0	South Korea
Riad 14', 17', 40', 48', 72', 77'; Mohamed 50'; El-Fanagily 61'; Etman 66'; Hassan 78'	Report

Chichibunomiya Rugby Stadium, Tokyo
Attendance: 16,039
Referee: Glöckner (Germany)

=== Group D ===
Pos	Team	Pld	W	D	L	GF	GA	GD	Pts	Qualification
1	Ghana	2	1	1	0	4	3	+1	3	Advanced to knockout stage
2	Japan	2	1	0	1	5	5	0	2	Advanced to knockout stage
3	Argentina	2	0	1	1	3	4	−1	1	
4	Italy	0	0	0	0	0	0	0	0	Withdrew

Source: RSSSF
12 October 1964
15:00

Argentina	1–1	Ghana
Bulla 26'	Report	Acquah 80'

Mitsuzawa Soccer Stadium, Yokohama
Attendance: 12,452
Referee: Menachem Ashkenazi (Israel)

14 October 1964
15:00

Japan	3–2	Argentina
Sugiyama 54'; Kawabuchi 81'; Ogi 82'	Report	Domínguez 24', 62'

Komazawa Olympic Park Stadium, Tokyo
Attendance: 19,049
Referee: Aleksandar Škorić (Yugoslavia)

16 October 1964
15:00

Ghana	3–2	Japan
Agyemag-Gyau 27'; Acquah 69'; Aggrey-Fynn 80'	Report	Sugiyama 12'; Yaegashi 52'

Komazawa Olympic Park Stadium, Tokyo
Referee: Cornel Niţescu (Romania)

== Knockout stage ==
=== Bracket ===
Quarter-finals
18 October – Yokohama
Romania	0
Hungary	2
18 October – Saitama
United Arab Republic	5
Ghana	1
18 October – Tokyo (KOPS)
Czechoslovakia	4
Japan	0
18 October – Tokyo (CRS)
Yugoslavia	0
United Team of Germany	1

Semi-finals
20 October – Tokyo (CRS)
Hungary	6
United Arab Republic	0
20 October – Tokyo (KOPS)
Czechoslovakia	2
United Team of Germany	1

Gold medal match
23 October – Tokyo (NS)
Hungary	2
Czechoslovakia	1
Bronze medal match
23 October – Tokyo (NS)
United Team of Germany	3
United Arab Republic	1

=== Quarter-finals ===
18 October 1964
15:00

Yugoslavia	0–1	United Team of Germany
	Report	Frenzel 1'

Chichibunomiya Rugby Stadium, Tokyo
Attendance: 15,767
Referee: Gregg de Silva (Malaysia)

18 October 1964
15:00

Romania	0–2	Hungary
	Report	Csernai 2', 84' (pen.)

Mitsuzawa Soccer Stadium, Yokohama
Attendance: 12,841
Referee: Menachem Ashkenazi (Israel)

18 October 1964
15:00

Czechoslovakia	4–0	Japan
Brumovský 43', 59'; Vojta 69' (pen.); Mráz 86'	Report

Komazawa Olympic Park Stadium, Tokyo
Attendance: 18,940
Referee: Eunapio de Queiroz (Brazil)

18 October 1964
15:00

United Arab Republic	5–1	Ghana
Badawi 42', 61'; Reyadh 65'; El-Fanagily 69', 85'	Report	Mfum 37'

Omiya Park Soccer Stadium, Saitama
Attendance: 13,121
Referee: Rudi Glöckner (Germany)

=== Semi-finals ===
20 October 1964
15:00

Czechoslovakia	2–1	United Team of Germany
Lichtnégl 47'; Mráz 89'	Report	Nöldner 25'

Komazawa Olympic Park Stadium, Tokyo
Attendance: 19,435
Referee: Menachem Ashkenazi (Israel)

20 October 1964
15:00

Hungary	6–0	United Arab Republic
Bene 7', 20', 66', 77'; Komora 29', 58'	Report

Chichibunomiya Rugby Stadium, Tokyo
Referee: Miguel Comesaña (Argentina)

=== First consolation round ===
20 October 1964
15:00

Japan	1–6	Yugoslavia
Kamamoto 61'	Report	Zambata 3', 5', 43', 63'; Osim 28', 60'

Nagai Stadium, Osaka
Attendance: 20,000
Referee: Hussein Imam (United Arab Emirates)

20 October 1964
15:00

Romania	4–2	Ghana
Pavlovici 12', 19', 74'; Creiniceanu 41'	Report	Aggrey-Fynn 25', 44'

Nishikyogoku Athletic Stadium, Kyoto
Attendance: 10,000
Referee: Gregg de Silva (Malaysia)

=== Fifth place play-off ===
22 October 1964
15:00

Yugoslavia	0–3	Romania
	Report	Pavlovici 50'; Pârcălab 72'; Constantin 78'

Nagai Stadium, Osaka
Attendance: 10,000
Referee: István Zsolt (Hungary)

=== Bronze medal match ===
23 October 1964
13:00

United Team of Germany	3–1	United Arab Republic
Frenzel 17'; Vogel 48'; Stöcker 56'	Report	Attia 75' (pen.)

Olympic Stadium, Tokyo
Attendance: 65,610
Referee: Yozo Yokoyama (Japan)

=== Gold medal match ===
23 October 1964
17:30

Hungary	2–1	Czechoslovakia
Weiss 47' (o.g.); Bene 59'	Report	Brumovský 80'

Olympic Stadium, Tokyo
Attendance: 65,610
Referee: Menachem Ashkenazi (Israel)

== Goalscorers ==
With 12 goals, Ferenc Bene of Hungary is the top scorer in the tournament. In total, 123 goals were scored by 56 different players, with only one of them credited as own goal.

12 goals

- (Hungary) Ferenc Bene

8 goals

- (United Arab Republic) Moustafa Reyadh

6 goals

- (Hungary) Tibor Csernai
- (Romania) Cornel Pavlovici

5 goals

- (Czechoslovakia) Ivan Mráz
- (Socialist Federal Republic of Yugoslavia) Slaven Zambata

4 goals

- (Czechoslovakia) Josef Vojta
- (Germany) Henning Frenzel
- (Socialist Federal Republic of Yugoslavia) Rudolf Belin
- (Socialist Federal Republic of Yugoslavia) Ivica Osim

3 goals

- (Czechoslovakia) Jan Brumovský
- (Germany) Eberhard Vogel
- (Ghana) Hamoud Fulaiteh
- (United Arab Republic) Rifaat El-Fanagily

2 goals

- (Argentina) Juan Carlos Domínguez
- (Brazil) Elizeu
- (Brazil) Roberto Miranda
- (Czechoslovakia) Karel Lichtnégl
- (Czechoslovakia) Vojtech Masný
- (Germany) Jürgen Nöldner
- (Hungary) Imre Komora
- (Japan) Ryūichi Sugiyama
- (Romania) Carol Creiniceanu
- (Romania) Ion Pârcălab
- (United Arab Republic) Badawi Abdel Fattah

1 goal

- (Argentina) Carlos Alberto Bulla
- (Brazil) Zé Roberto
- (Czechoslovakia) Anton Urban
- (Czechoslovakia) František Valošek
- (Czechoslovakia) Ľudovít Cvetler
- (Germany) Bernd Bauchspieß
- (Germany) Hermann Stöcker
- (Germany) Wolfgang Barthels
- (Ghana) Edward Acquah
- (Ghana) Gyau Agyemang
- (Ghana) Sam Acquah
- (Ghana) Wilberforce Mfum
- (Hungary) János Farkas
- (Iran) Karam Ali Nirlou
- (Japan) Aritatsu Ogi
- (Japan) Kunishige Kamamoto
- (Japan) Saburō Kawabuchi
- (Japan) Shigeo Yaegashi
- Javier Fragoso
- José Luis González Dávila
- (Morocco) Ali Bouachra
- (Romania) Ion Ionescu
- (Romania) Gheorghe Constantin
- (South Korea) Lee Yi-Woo
- (United Arab Republic) Aly Etman
- (United Arab Republic) Kalil Shanin
- (United Arab Republic) Mahmoud Hassan
- (United Arab Republic) Raafat Attia
- (United Arab Republic) Seddik Mohamed
- (Socialist Federal Republic of Yugoslavia) Spasoje Samardžić

Own goal

- (Czechoslovakia) Vladimír Weiss (playing against Hungary)

== Final ranking ==
Pos	Team	Pld	W	D	L	GF	GA	GD	Pts
1	Hungary	5	5	0	0	22	6	+16	10
2	Czechoslovakia	6	5	0	1	19	5	+14	10
3	United Team of Germany	6	4	1	1	12	4	+8	9
4	United Arab Republic	6	2	1	3	18	16	+2	5
5	Romania	6	4	1	1	12	6	+6	9
6	Yugoslavia	5	2	0	3	14	12	+2	4
7	Ghana	4	1	1	2	7	12	−5	3
8	Japan	4	1	0	3	6	15	−9	2
9	Brazil	3	1	1	1	5	2	+3	3
10	Argentina	2	0	1	1	3	4	−1	1
11	Mexico	3	0	1	2	2	6	−4	1
12	Iran	3	0	1	2	1	6	−5	1
13	Morocco	2	0	0	2	1	9	−8	0
14	South Korea	3	0	0	3	1	20	−19	0

Source: rsssf.com
