= Football at the 1964 Summer Olympics – Group A =

Football at the Summer Olympics group

Group A of the 1964 Summer Olympics football tournament took place from 11 to 15 October 1964. The group consisted of East Germany, Iran, Mexico and Romania. The top two teams, East Germany and Romania, advanced to the quarter-finals.

== Teams ==
Team	Region	Method of qualification	Date of qualification	Finals appearance	Last appearance	Previous best performance							
Team	Region	Method of qualification	Date of qualification	Finals appearance	Last appearance	Previous best performance	Mexico	North America	CONCACAF Round Robin winners	20 March 1964	3rd	1948	First round (1928, 1948)
Romania	Europe	Europe Group 1 winners	31 May 1964	1st	—	—							
United Team of Germany	Europe	Europe Group 3 winners	28 June 1964	1st	—	—							
Iran	Asia	Asia Group 3 winners	28 June 1964	1st	—	—							

== Standings ==
Pos	Team	Pld	W	D	L	GF	GA	GD	Pts	Qualification
1	United Team of Germany	3	2	1	0	7	1	+6	5	Advanced to knockout stage
2	Romania	3	2	1	0	5	2	+3	5	Advanced to knockout stage
3	Mexico	3	0	1	2	2	6	−4	1	
4	Iran	3	0	1	2	1	6	−5	1	

Source: RSSSF

In the quarter-finals:

- The winners of Group A, United Team of Germany, advanced to play the runners-up of Group B, Yugoslavia.
- The runners-up of Group A, Romania, advanced to play the winners of Group B, Hungary.

== Matches ==
All times listed are local, JST (UTC+9).

=== United Team of Germany vs Iran ===
11 October 1964
15:00

United Team of Germany	4–0	Iran
Bauchspiess 7'; Vogel 20', 63'; Frenzel 44'	Report

Mitsuzawa Stadium, Yokohama
Attendance: 12,671
Referee: Eunápio de Queiroz (Brazil)

1	Jürgen Heinsch
2	Klaus Urbanczyk
3	Manfred Walter
4	Manfred Geisler
7	Herbert Pankau
9	Gerhard Körner
11	Dieter Engelhardt
13	Bernd Bauchspieß
14	Henning Frenzel
15	Otto Fräßdorf
18	Eberhard Vogel
Substitutions:
20	Horst Weigang
5	Klaus-Dieter Seehaus
6	Werner Unger
8	Peter Rock
10	Wolfgang Barthels
12	Gerd Backhaus
16	Nikola Parchanov
17	Klaus Lisiewicz
19	Hermann Stöcker
Manager:
(Hungary) Károly Sós

1	Aziz Asli
2	Mansour Amirasefi
3	Ali Mirzaei
4	Mostafa Arab
5	Hassan Habibi
6	Ebrahim Latifi
7	Abdollah Saedi
8	Kambozia Jamali
9	Jalal Talebi
10	Gholam Hossein Nourian
16	Parviz Ghelichkhani
Substitutions:
17	Mohammad Bayati
11	Hossein Khodaparast
12	Karam Nirlou
13	Gholam Hossein Fanaei
14	Fariborz Esmaeili
15	Dariush Mostafavi
Manager:
(Iran) Hossein Fekri

Assistant referees:
Mahmoud Hussein Imam (Egypt)
John Stanley Wontum (Ghana)

=== Romania vs Mexico ===
11 October 1964
15:00

Romania	3–1	Mexico
Creiniceanu 20'; Pircalab 33'; Ionescu 47'	Report	Fragoso 73'

Omiya Ground, Saitama
Attendance: 12,932
Referee: Yozo Yokoyama (Japan)

1	Ilie Datcu
2	Ilie Greavu
3	Ion Nunweiller
4	Bujor Hălmăgeanu
6	Dan Coe
8	Gheorghe Constantin
9	Ion Ionescu
10	Constantin Koszka
11	Carol Creiniceanu
15	Emil Petru
17	Ion Pârcălab
Substitutions:
12	Marin Andrei
20	Stere Adamache
5	Emerich Jenei
7	Sorin Avram
13	Mircea Petescu
14	Dumitru Ivan
16	Nicolae Georgescu
18	Emil Dumitriu
19	Cornel Pavlovici
Manager:
(Romania) Silviu Ploeșteanu

1	Ignacio Calderón
4	Guillermo Hernández
5	Miguel Galván
6	José Luis González	Booked
7	Felipe Ruvalcaba
8	Javier Fragoso
9	Ernesto Cisneros
10	Raúl Chávez
12	Efrain Loza
13	Raúl Arellano
18	Albino Morales
Substitutions:
2	Carlos Gutiérrez
3	Carlos Albert
11	Alejandro Mollinedo
14	Pablo López
15	José Luis Aussín
16	Roberto Escalante
17	Mario Ayala
Manager:
(Mexico) Ignacio Trelles

Assistant referees:
Miguel Comesaña (Argentina)
Toshio Asami (Japan)

=== United Team of Germany vs Romania ===
13 October 1964
15:00

United Team of Germany	1–1	Romania
Frenzel 22'	Report	Pavlovici 27'

Komazawa Olympic Park Stadium, Tokyo
Attendance: 18,970
Referee: Václav Korelusz (Czechoslovakia)

1	Jürgen Heinsch
2	Klaus Urbanczyk
3	Manfred Walter
4	Manfred Geisler
7	Herbert Pankau
9	Gerhard Körner
13	Bernd Bauchspieß
14	Henning Frenzel
15	Otto Fräßdorf
16	Nikola Parchanov
18	Eberhard Vogel	(red card) 33'
Substitutions:
20	Horst Weigang
5	Klaus-Dieter Seehaus
6	Werner Unger
8	Peter Rock
10	Wolfgang Barthels
11	Dieter Engelhardt
12	Gerd Backhaus
17	Klaus Lisiewicz
19	Hermann Stöcker
Manager:
(Hungary) Károly Sós

1	Ilie Datcu
2	Ilie Greavu
3	Ion Nunweiller
4	Bujor Hălmăgeanu
5	Emerich Jenei
6	Dan Coe
8	Gheorghe Constantin
10	Constantin Koszka
11	Carol Creiniceanu
17	Ion Pârcălab
19	Cornel Pavlovici
Substitutions:
12	Marin Andrei
20	Stere Adamache
7	Sorin Avram
9	Ion Ionescu
13	Mircea Petescu
14	Dumitru Ivan
15	Emil Petru
16	Nicolae Georgescu
18	Emil Dumitriu
Manager:
(Romania) Silviu Ploeșteanu

Assistant referees:
Menachem Ashkenazi (Israel)
Duk Chun Kim (South Korea)

=== Iran vs Mexico ===
13 October 1964
15:00

Iran	1–1	Mexico
Nirlou 59'	Report	González 54'

Chichibu Stadium, Tokyo
Attendance: 15,938
Referee: John Stanley Wontumi (Ghana)

17	Mohammad Bayati
2	Mansour Amirasefi
4	Mostafa Arab
5	Hassan Habibi
6	Ebrahim Latifi
8	Kambozia Jamali
9	Jalal Talebi
10	Gholam Hossein Nourian	Booked
12	Karam Nirlou
14	Fariborz Esmaeili
15	Dariush Mostafavi
Substitutions:
1	Aziz Asli
3	Ali Mirzaei
7	Abdollah Saedi
11	Hossein Khodaparast
13	Gholam Hossein Fanaei
16	Parviz Ghelichkhani
Manager:
(Iran) Hossein Fekri

1	Ignacio Calderón
4	Guillermo Hernández
5	Miguel Galván
6	José Luis González
7	Felipe Ruvalcaba
8	Javier Fragoso
9	Ernesto Cisneros
10	Raúl Chávez
12	Efrain Loza	Booked
13	Raúl Arellano
18	Albino Morales
Substitutions:
2	Carlos Gutiérrez
3	Carlos Albert
11	Alejandro Mollinedo
14	Pablo López
15	José Luis Aussín
16	Roberto Escalante
17	Mario Ayala
Manager:
(Mexico) Ignacio Trelles

Assistant referees:
Yozo Yokoyama (Japan)
Tashio Asami (Japan)

=== United Team of Germany vs Mexico ===
15 October 1964
15:00

United Team of Germany	2–0	Mexico
Barthels 37'; Nöldner 66'	Report

Mitsuzawa Stadium, Yokohama
Attendance: 12,814
Referee: Gregg de Silva (Malaysia)

20	Horst Weigang
2	Klaus Urbanczyk
3	Manfred Walter
5	Klaus-Dieter Seehaus
6	Werner Unger
8	Peter Rock
10	Wolfgang Barthels
15	Otto Fräßdorf
16	Nikola Parchanov
17	Klaus Lisiewicz
18	Eberhard Vogel
Substitutions:
1	Jürgen Heinsch
4	Manfred Geisler
7	Herbert Pankau
9	Gerhard Körner
11	Dieter Engelhardt
12	Gerd Backhaus
13	Bernd Bauchspieß
14	Henning Frenzel
19	Hermann Stöcker
Manager:
(Hungary) Károly Sós

1	Ignacio Calderón
2	Carlos Gutiérrez
3	Carlos Albert
5	Miguel Galván
6	José Luis González
7	Felipe Ruvalcaba
8	Javier Fragoso
10	Raúl Chávez
12	Efrain Loza
15	José Luis Aussín
18	Albino Morales
Substitutions:
4	Guillermo Hernández
9	Ernesto Cisneros
11	Alejandro Mollinedo
13	Raúl Arellano
14	Pablo López
16	Roberto Escalante
17	Mario Ayala
Manager:
(Mexico) Ignacio Trelles

Assistant referees:
Duk Chun Kim (South Korea)
Hiroshi Sato (Japan)

=== Romania vs Iran ===
15 October 1964
15:00

Romania	1–0	Iran
Pavlovici 26'	Report

Omiya Ground, Saitama
Attendance: 13,026
Referee: Miguel Comesaña (Argentina)

12	Marin Andrei
2	Ilie Greavu
3	Ion Nunweiller
7	Sorin Avram
8	Gheorghe Constantin
9	Ion Ionescu
10	Constantin Koszka
11	Carol Creiniceanu
13	Mircea Petescu
14	Dumitru Ivan
19	Cornel Pavlovici
Substitutions:
1	Ilie Datcu
20	Stere Adamache
4	Bujor Hălmăgeanu
5	Emerich Jenei
6	Dan Coe
15	Emil Petru
16	Nicolae Georgescu
17	Ion Pârcălab
18	Emil Dumitriu
Manager:
(Romania) Silviu Ploeșteanu

1	Aziz Asli
2	Mansour Amirasefi
4	Mostafa Arab
5	Hassan Habibi
6	Ebrahim Latifi
9	Jalal Talebi
10	Gholam Hossein Nourian
12	Karam Nirlou
14	Fariborz Esmaeili
15	Dariush Mostafavi
16	Parviz Ghelichkhani
Substitutions:
17	Mohammad Bayati
3	Ali Mirzaei
7	Abdollah Saedi
8	Kambozia Jamali
11	Hossein Khodaparast
13	Gholam Hossein Fanaei
Manager:
(Iran) Hossein Fekri

Assistant referees:
Eunápio de Queiròz (Brazil)
Taro Ikeda (Japan)

== See also ==
- United Team of Germany at the Olympics
- Romania at the Olympics
- Mexico at the Olympics
- Iran at the Olympics
