= United Team of Germany at the 1964 Summer Olympics =

- Flag of Germany superimposed with the Olympic rings
- IOC code: EUA
- NOC: United Team of Germany

in Tokyo, Japan 10−24 October
- Competitors: 337 (275 men and 62 women) in 19 sports
- Flag bearer: Ingrid Engel-Krämer
- Medals Ranked 4th: Gold 10 Silver 22 Bronze 18 Total 50

Summer Olympics appearances (overview)
- 1956; 1960; 1964

Other related appearances
- Germany (1896–1936, 1952, 1992–pres.); Saar (1952); East Germany (1968–1988); West Germany (1968–1988)

Athletes from East Germany (German Democratic Republic; GDR) and West Germany (Federal Republic of Germany; FRG) competed together as the United Team of Germany for the last time at the 1964 Summer Olympics in Tokyo, Japan. 337 competitors, 275 men and 62 women, took part in 159 events in 19 sports.

== Medalists ==
Nationality in brackets.

=== Gold ===
- Karin Balzer (East Germany) — Athletics, Women's 80 m Hurdles
- Willi Holdorf (West Germany) — Athletics, Men's Decathlon
- Jürgen Eschert (East Germany) — Canoeing, Men's C1 1000 m Canoe Singles
- Roswitha Esser, Annemarie Zimmermann (both from West Germany) — Canoeing, Women's K2 500 m Kayak Pairs
- Lothar Claesges, Karl-Heinz Henrichs, Karl Link, Ernst Streng (all from West Germany) — Cycling, Men's Team Pursuit
- Ingrid Engel-Krämer (East Germany) — Diving, Women's 3 m Springboard
- Harry Boldt, Reiner Klimke, Josef Neckermann (all from West Germany) — Equestrian, Dressage Team
- Hermann Schridde, Kurt Jarasinski, Hans Günter Winkler (all from West Germany) — Equestrian, Jumping Team
- Peter Neusel, Bernhard Britting, Joachim Werner, Egbert Hirschfelder, Jürgen Oelke (all from West Germany) — Rowing, Men's Coxed Fours
- Wilhelm Kuhweide (West Germany) — Sailing, Finn

=== Silver ===
- Harald Norpoth (West Germany) — Athletics, Men's 5000 metres
- Dieter Lindner (East Germany) — Athletics, Men's 20 km Walk
- Wolfgang Reinhardt (West Germany) — Athletics, Men's Pole Vault
- Renate Culmberger (East Germany) — Athletics, Women's Shot Put
- Ingrid Lotz (East Germany) — Athletics, Women's Discus Throw
- Emil Schulz (West Germany) — Boxing, Men's Middleweight
- Hans Huber (West Germany) — Boxing, Men's Heavyweight
- Günter Perleberg, Bernhard Schulze, Friedhelm Wentzke, Holger Zander (all from West Germany) — Canoeing, K4 1000 m Kayak Fours
- Ingrid Engel-Krämer (East Germany) — Diving, Women's 10 m Platform
- Harry Boldt (West Germany) — Equestrian, Dressage Individual
- Hermann Schridde (West Germany) — Equestrian, Jumping Individual
- Helga Mees (West Germany) — Fencing, Individual Foil
- Birgit Radochla (East Germany) — Gymnastics, Women's Vault
- Wolfgang Hofmann (West Germany) — Judo, Men's 80 kg
- Achim Hill (East Germany) — Rowing, Men's Single Sculls
- Klaus Aeffke, Klaus Bittner, Karl-Heinrich von Groddeck, Hans-Jürgen Wallbrecht, Klaus Behrens, Jürgen Schröder, Jürgen Plagemann, Horst Meyer, Thomas Ahrens (all from West Germany) — Rowing, Men's Eight
- Peter Ahrendt, Wilfried Lorenz, Ulrich Mense (all from East Germany) — Sailing, Dragon
- Frank Wiegand (East Germany) — Swimming, Men's 400 m Freestyle
- Horst Löffler (West Germany), Frank Wiegand (East Germany), Uwe Jacobsen (West Germany), Hans-Joachim Klein (West Germany) — Swimming, Men's 4 × 100 m Freestyle Relay
- Horst-Günter Gregor (East Germany), Gerhard Hetz (West Germany), Frank Wiegand (East Germany), Hans-Joachim Klein (West Germany) — Swimming, Men's 4 × 200 m Freestyle Relay
- Ernst-Joachim Küppers (West Germany), Egon Henninger (East Germany), Horst-Günter Gregor (East Germany), Hans-Joachim Klein (West Germany) — Swimming, Men's 4 × 100 m Medley Relay
- Klaus Rost (West Germany) — Wrestling, Men's Freestyle Lightweight

=== Bronze ===
- Klaus Lehnertz (West Germany) — Athletics, Men's Pole Vault
- Uwe Beyer (West Germany) — Athletics, Men's Hammer Throw
- Hans-Joachim Walde (West Germany) — Athletics, Men's Decathlon
- Heinz Schulz (East Germany) — Boxing, Men's Featherweight
- Heinz Büker, Holger Zander (both from West Germany) — Canoeing, K2 1000 m Kayak Pairs
- Willi Fuggerer, Klaus Kobusch (both from West Germany) — Cycling, Men's Tandem
- Fritz Ligges (West Germany) — Equestrian, Three-Day Event Individual
- Fritz Ligges (West Germany), Horst Karsten (West Germany), Gerhard Schulz (East Germany) — Equestrian, Three-Day Event Team
- Heidi Schmid, Helga Mees, Rosemarie Scherberger, Gudrun Theuerkauff (all from West Germany) — Fencing, Women's Team Foil
- Gerd Backhaus, Wolfgang Barthels, Bernd Bauchspieß, Gerhard Körner, Otto Fräßdorf, Henning Frenzel, Dieter Engelhardt, Herbert Pankau, Manfred Geisler, Jürgen Heinsch, Klaus Lisiewicz, Jürgen Nöldner, Peter Rock, Klaus-Dieter Seehaus, Hermann Stöcker, Werner Unger, Klaus Urbanczyk, Eberhard Vogel, Manfred Walter, Horst Weigang (all from East Germany) — Football, Men's Team Competition
- Siegfried Fülle (East Germany), Philipp Fürst (West Germany), Erwin Koppe (East Germany), Klaus Köste (East Germany), Günter Lyhs (West Germany), Peter Weber (East Germany) — Gymnastics, Men's Team All-Around
- Klaus Glahn (West Germany) — Judo, Men's Open Category
- Michael Schwan, Wolfgang Hottenrott (both from West Germany) — Rowing, Men's Coxless Pairs
- Hans-Joachim Klein (West Germany) — Swimming, Men's 100 m Freestyle
- Gerhard Hetz (West Germany) — Swimming, Men's 400 m Individual Medley
- Lothar Metz (East Germany) — Wrestling, Men's Greco-Roman Middleweight
- Heinz Kiehl (West Germany) — Wrestling, Men's Greco-Roman Light Heavyweight
- Wilfried Dietrich (West Germany) — Wrestling, Men's Greco-Roman Heavyweight

== Cycling ==
Thirteen cyclists represented Germany in 1964.

Individual road race

- Wilfried Peffgen
- Burkhard Ebert
- Immo Rittmeyer
- Günter Hoffmann

Team time trial

- Burkhard Ebert
- Günter Hoffmann
- Peter Glemser
- Immo Rittmeyer

Sprint

- Willi Fuggerer
- Ulrich Schillinger

1000 m time trial

- Lothar Claesges

Tandem

- Willi Fuggerer
- Klaus Kobusch

Individual pursuit

- Lothar Spiegelberg

Team pursuit

- Lothar Claesges
- Karl Heinz Henrichs
- Karl Link
- Ernst Streng

== Diving ==
Men

Athlete	Event	Preliminary		Final			
Athlete	Event	Points	Rank	Points	Rank	Total	Rank
Hans-Dieter Pophal	3 m springboard	91.16	8 Q	51.42	3	142.58	4
Horst Rosenfeldt	3 m springboard	85.66	17	Did not advance			
Rolf Sperling	3 m springboard	86.98	14	Did not advance			
Klaus Konzorr	10 m platform	90.08	15	Did not advance			
Rolf Sperling	10 m platform	92.24	8 Q	50.00	4	142.24	7
Gerd Völker	10 m platform	91.62	9	Did not advance			

Women

Athlete	Event	Preliminary		Final			
Athlete	Event	Points	Rank	Points	Rank	Total	Rank
Ingrid Engel-Krämer	3 m springboard	94.69	1 Q	50.31	1	145.00	1st place, gold medalist(s)
Angelika Hilbert	3 m springboard	86.53	5 Q	36.74	8	123.27	8
Christiane Lanzke	3 m springboard	82.56	10	Did not advance			
Ingrid Engel-Krämer	10 m platform	52.98	3 Q	45.47	3	98.45	2nd place, silver medalist(s)
Christiane Lanzke	10 m platform	49.69	6 Q	43.23	5	92.92	5
Delia Reinhardt	10 m platform	47.83	8 Q	38.96	10	86.79	10

== Fencing ==
19 fencers, 15 men and 4 women, represented Germany in 1964.

Men's foil

- Tim Gerresheim
- Jürgen Brecht
- Dieter Schmitt

Men's team foil

- Jürgen Brecht, Dieter Wellmann, Eberhard Mehl, Tim Gerresheim, Jürgen Theuerkauff

Men's épée

- Franz Rompza
- Dietrich Hecke
- Paul Gnaier

Men's team épée

- Franz Rompza, Max Geuter, Volkmar Würtz, Paul Gnaier, Haakon Stein

Men's sabre

- Walter Köstner
- Dieter Wellmann
- Jürgen Theuerkauff

Men's team sabre

- Dieter Wellmann, Klaus Allisat, Walter Köstner, Jürgen Theuerkauff, Percy Borucki

Women's foil

- Helga Mees
- Heidi Schmid
- Romy Weiß-Scherberger

Women's team foil

- Helga Mees, Heidi Schmid, Romy Weiß-Scherberger, Gundi Theuerkauff

== Field hockey ==
Twelve male field hockey players competed in 1964, when the German team finished in 5th place.

- Rainer Stephan
- Axel Thieme
- Klaus Vetter
- Horst Brennecke
- Klaus Bahner
- Horst Dahmlos
- Lothar Lippert
- Rolf Westphal
- Karl-Heinz Freiberger
- Dieter Ehrlich
- Adolf Krause
- Reiner Hanschke

== Modern pentathlon ==
Three male pentathletes represented Germany in 1964.

Individual

- Wolfgang Gödicke
- Uwe Adler
- Elmar Frings

Team

- Wolfgang Gödicke
- Uwe Adler
- Elmar Frings

== Rowing ==
The United Team of Germany had 26 male rowers participate in all seven rowing events in 1960.

Men's single sculls – 2nd place ( silver medal)

- Achim Hill

Men's double sculls – 5th place

- Helmut Lebert
- Josef Steffes-Mies

Men's coxless pair – 3rd place ( bronze medal)

- Michael Schwan
- Wolfgang Hottenrott

Men's coxed pair

- Günter Bergau
- Peter Gorny
- Karl-Heinz Danielowski

Men's coxless four

- Günter Schroers
- Horst Effertz
- Albrecht Müller
- Manfred Misselhorn

Men's coxed four – 1st place ( gold medal)

- Peter Neusel
- Bernhard Britting
- Joachim Werner
- Egbert Hirschfelder
- Jürgen Oelke

Men's eight – 2nd place ( silver medal)

- Klaus Aeffke
- Klaus Bittner
- Karl-Heinrich von Groddeck
- Hans-Jürgen Wallbrecht
- Klaus Behrens
- Jürgen Schröder
- Jürgen Plagemann
- Horst Meyer
- Thomas Ahrens

== Shooting ==
Ten shooters represented Germany in 1964.

25 m pistol

- Lothar Jacobi
- Gerhard Feller

50 m pistol

- Johann Garreis
- Hans Kaupmannsennecke

300 m rifle, three positions

- Harry Köcher
- Klaus Zähringer

50 m rifle, three positions

- Harry Köcher
- Klaus Zähringer

50 m rifle, prone

- Karl Wenk
- Rudolf Bortz

Trap

- Joachim Marscheider
- Heinz Rehder

== Swimming ==
Men

Athlete	Event	Heat		Semifinal		Final	
Athlete	Event	Time	Rank	Time	Rank	Time	Rank
Uwe Jacobsen	100 m freestyle	55.6	=14 Q	54.8	=7 Q	56.1	8
Hans-Joachim Klein	100 m freestyle	55.3	9 Q	54.4	6 Q	54.0	3rd place, bronze medalist(s)
Horst Löffler	100 m freestyle	55.6	=14 Q	56.0	19	Did not advance	
Martin Klink	400 m freestyle	4:29.1	19	—N/a		Did not advance	
Wolfgang Kremer	400 m freestyle	4:29.9	22	—N/a		Did not advance	
Frank Wiegand	400 m freestyle	4:17.2	3 Q	—N/a		4:14.9	2nd place, silver medalist(s)
Heinz Junga	1500 m freestyle	18:08.7	19	—N/a		Did not advance	
Holger Kirschke	1500 m freestyle	18:01.6	15	—N/a		Did not advance	
Jürgen Dietze	200 m backstroke	2:20.4	=19	Did not advance			
Ernst-Joachim Küppers	200 m backstroke	2:17.9	12 Q	2:15.3	4 Q	2:15.7	5
Wolfgang Wagner	200 m backstroke	2:18.5	14 Q	2:20.2	15	Did not advance	
Egon Henninger	200 m breaststroke	2:30.1 OR	1 Q	2:33.3	=6 Q	2:31.1	5
Klaus Katzur	200 m breaststroke	2:36.7	13 Q	2:37.3	13	Did not advance	
Willi Messner	200 m breaststroke	2:36.0	11 Q	2:35.5	12	Did not advance	
Werner Freitag	200 m butterfly	2:16.9	15 Q	2:13.5	10	Did not advance	
Hermann Lotter	200 m butterfly	2:18.2	20	Did not advance			
Wolfgang Platzeck	200 m butterfly	2:18.7	22	Did not advance			
Gerhard Hetz	400 m individual medley	4:57.6	2 Q	—N/a		4:51.0	3rd place, bronze medalist(s)
Dieter Pfeifer	400 m individual medley	5:05.2	9	—N/a		Did not advance	
Stefan Weinrich	400 m individual medley	5:07.8	13	—N/a		Did not advance	
Horst Löffler; Frank Wiegand; Uwe Jacobsen; Hans-Joachim Klein	4 × 100 m freestyle relay	3:41.0	3 Q	—N/a		3:37.2	2nd place, silver medalist(s)
Horst-Günter Gregor; Gerhard Hetz; Frank Wiegand; Hans-Joachim Klein	4 × 200 m freestyle relay	8:09.7 OR	2 Q	—N/a		7:59.3	2nd place, silver medalist(s)
Ernst-Joachim Küppers; Egon Henninger; Horst-Günter Gregor; Hans-Joachim Klein	4 × 100 m medley relay	4:06.6	2 Q	—N/a		4:01.6	2nd place, silver medalist(s)

Women

Athlete	Event	Heat		Semifinal		Final	
Athlete	Event	Time	Rank	Time	Rank	Time	Rank
Traudi Beierlein	100 m freestyle	1:05.4	31	Did not advance			
Martina Grunert	100 m freestyle	1:03.1	10 Q	1:03.1	12	Did not advance	
Rita Schumacher	100 m freestyle	1:03.5	17	Did not advance			
Martina Grunert	400 m freestyle	4:57.7	13	—N/a		Did not advance	
Heidi Pechstein	400 m freestyle	5:01.4	14	—N/a		Did not advance	
Jutta Wanke	400 m freestyle	5:01.7	15	—N/a		Did not advance	
Petra Nerger	100 m backstroke	1:12.1	18	—N/a		Did not advance	
Helga Neuber	100 m backstroke	1:11.4	=12	—N/a		Did not advance	
Ingrid Schmidt	100 m backstroke	1:11.1	=9	—N/a		Did not advance	
Bärbel Grimmer	200 m breaststroke	2:48.6 OR	2 Q	—N/a		2:51.0	6
Ursula Küper	200 m breaststroke	2:50.1	6 Q	—N/a		2:53.9	8
Wiltrud Urselmann	200 m breaststroke	2:53.2	10	—N/a		Did not advance	
Ursel Brunner	100 m butterfly	1:13.6	26	Did not advance			
Heike Hustede	100 m butterfly	1:10.5	14 Q	1:08.8	8 Q	1:08.5	6
Ute Noack	100 m butterfly	1:09.2	7 Q	1:09.3	10	Did not advance	
Harriet Blank	400 m individual medley	5:42.4	14	—N/a		Did not advance	
Veronika Holletz	400 m individual medley	5:26.8	2 Q	—N/a		5:25.6	4
Helga Zimmermann	400 m individual medley	5:38.9	11	—N/a		Did not advance	
Martina Grunert; Traudi Beierlein; Rita Schumacher; Heidi Pechstein	4 × 100 m freestyle relay	4:14.9	=6 Q	—N/a		4:15.0	6
Ingrid Schmidt; Bärbel Grimmer; Heike Hustede; Martina Grunert	4 × 100 m medley relay	4:43.2	4 Q	—N/a		DSQ	
