= List of East German football champions =

East German Football Championship
- Founded
- 1948
- Folded
- 1991
- Last Champions
- F.C. Hansa Rostock (1st title)
- Country
- East Germany
- Most successful club
- BFC Dynamo (10 titles)

The East German football champions were the annual winners of the DDR-Oberliga.

== History ==
The 1948 and 1949 East German Champions were determined in a single elimination tournament of three rounds. A nationwide football league, the DDR-Oberliga, was established for the 1949–50 season. The Oberliga was dissolved after the 1990–91 season.

The 1954–55 season was a transitional season and neither was a championship awarded nor were clubs relegated. Due to the transition from a fall-spring to a spring-fall schedule starting with 1956, teams only met each other once from August to December 1955.

In the 1961–62 season the DDR-Oberliga returned from a spring-fall to fall-spring schedule, the teams thus met each other three times. The third meeting was held on neutral ground.

== Champions ==
The performance of various clubs is shown in the following table:

Season	Champion	Runner-up	Third Place	Top Scorer (Goals)
1948	SG Planitz (1)	SG Freiimfelde Halle	—	—
1949	ZSG Union Halle (1)	SG Fortuna Erfurt	—	—
1949–50	ZSG Horch Zwickau (2)	SG Friedrichstadt	BSG Waggonbau Dessau	(East Germany) Heinz Satrapa (23)
1950–51	BSG Chemie Leipzig (1)	BSG Turbine Erfurt	BSG Motor Zwickau	(East Germany) Johannes Schöne (37)
1951–52	BSG Turbine Halle (2)	SV Deutsche Volkspolizei Dresden	BSG Chemie Leipzig	(East Germany) Rudolf Krause (27)
1952–53	SG Dynamo Dresden (1)	BSG Wismut Aue	BSG Motor Zwickau	(East Germany) Harry Arlt (26)
1953–54	BSG Turbine Erfurt (1)	BSG Chemie Leipzig	SG Dynamo Dresden	(East Germany) Heinz Satrapa (21)
1954–55	SC Turbine Erfurt (2)	SC Wismut Karl-Marx-Stadt	SC Rotation Leipzig	(East Germany) Willy Tröger (22)
1955	SC Wismut Karl-Marx-Stadt	SC Empor Rostock	SC Dynamo Berlin	(East Germany) Klaus Seligow (12)
1956	SC Wismut Karl-Marx-Stadt (1)	SC Aktivist Brieske Senftenberg	SC Lokomotive Leipzig	(East Germany) Ernst Lindner (18)
1957	SC Wismut Karl-Marx-Stadt (2)	ASK Vorwärts Berlin	SC Rotation Leipzig	(East Germany) Heinz Kaulmann (15)
1958	ASK Vorwärts Berlin (1)	SC Motor Jena	SC Aktivist Brieske Senftenberg	(East Germany) Helmut Müller (17)
1959	SC Wismut Karl-Marx-Stadt (3)	ASK Vorwärts Berlin	SC Dynamo Berlin	(East Germany) Bernd Bauchspieß (18)
1960	ASK Vorwärts Berlin (2)	SC Dynamo Berlin	SC Lokomotive Leipzig	(East Germany) Bernd Bauchspieß (25)
1961–62	ASK Vorwärts Berlin (3)	SC Empor Rostock	SC Dynamo Berlin	(East Germany) Arthur Bialas (23)
1962–63	SC Motor Jena (1)	SC Empor Rostock	ASK Vorwärts Berlin	(East Germany) Peter Ducke (19)
1963–64	BSG Chemie Leipzig (2)	SC Empor Rostock	SC Leipzig	(East Germany) Gerd Backhaus (15)
1964–65	ASK Vorwärts Berlin (4)	SC Motor Jena	BSG Chemie Leipzig	(East Germany) Bernd Bauchspieß (14)
1965–66	FC Vorwärts Berlin (5)	FC Carl Zeiss Jena	1. FC Lokomotive Leipzig	(East Germany) Henning Frenzel (22)
1966–67	FC Karl-Marx-Stadt (1)	1. FC Lokomotive Leipzig	BSG Motor Zwickau	(East Germany) Hartmund Rentzsch (17)
1967–68	FC Carl Zeiss Jena (2)	F.C. Hansa Rostock	1. FC Magdeburg	(East Germany) Gerhard Kostmann (15)
1968–69	FC Vorwärts Berlin (6)	FC Carl Zeiss Jena	1. FC Magdeburg	(East Germany) Gerhard Kostmann (18)
1969–70	FC Carl Zeiss Jena (3)	FC Vorwärts Berlin	Dynamo Dresden	(East Germany) Otto Skrowny (12)
1970–71	Dynamo Dresden (2)	FC Carl Zeiss Jena	Hallescher FC Chemie	(East Germany) Hans-Jürgen Kreische (17)
1971–72	1. FC Magdeburg (1)	BFC Dynamo	Dynamo Dresden	(East Germany) Hans-Jürgen Kreische (14)
1972–73	Dynamo Dresden (3)	FC Carl Zeiss Jena	1. FC Magdeburg	(East Germany) Hans-Jürgen Kreische (26)
1973–74	1. FC Magdeburg (2)	FC Carl Zeiss Jena	Dynamo Dresden	(East Germany) Hans-Bert Matoul (20)
1974–75	1. FC Magdeburg (3)	FC Carl Zeiss Jena	Dynamo Dresden	(East Germany) Manfred Vogel (17)
1975–76	Dynamo Dresden (4)	BFC Dynamo	1. FC Magdeburg	(East Germany) Hans-Jürgen Kreische (24)
1976–77	Dynamo Dresden (5)	1. FC Magdeburg	FC Carl Zeiss Jena	(East Germany) Joachim Streich (17)
1977–78	Dynamo Dresden (6)	1. FC Magdeburg	BFC Dynamo	(East Germany) Klaus Havenstein (15)
1978–79	BFC Dynamo (1)	Dynamo Dresden	FC Carl Zeiss Jena	(East Germany) Joachim Streich (23)
1979–80	BFC Dynamo (2)	Dynamo Dresden	FC Carl Zeiss Jena	(East Germany) Dieter Kühn (21)
1980–81	BFC Dynamo (3)	FC Carl Zeiss Jena	1. FC Magdeburg	(East Germany) Joachim Streich (20)
1981–82	BFC Dynamo (4)	Dynamo Dresden	1. FC Lokomotive Leipzig	(East Germany) Rüdiger Schnuphase (19)
1982–83	BFC Dynamo (5)	FC Vorwärts Frankfurt	FC Carl Zeiss Jena	(East Germany) Joachim Streich (19)
1983–84	BFC Dynamo (6)	Dynamo Dresden	1. FC Lokomotive Leipzig	(East Germany) Rainer Ernst (20)
1984–85	BFC Dynamo (7)	Dynamo Dresden	1. FC Lokomotive Leipzig	(East Germany) Rainer Ernst (24)
1985–86	BFC Dynamo (8)	1. FC Lokomotive Leipzig	FC Carl Zeiss Jena	(East Germany) Ralf Sträßer (14)
1986–87	BFC Dynamo (9)	Dynamo Dresden	1. FC Lokomotive Leipzig	(East Germany) Frank Pastor (17)
1987–88	BFC Dynamo (10)	1. FC Lokomotive Leipzig	Dynamo Dresden	(East Germany) Andreas Thom (20)
1988–89	Dynamo Dresden (7)	BFC Dynamo	FC Karl-Marx-Stadt	(East Germany) Torsten Gütschow (17)
1989–90	Dynamo Dresden (8)	FC Karl-Marx-Stadt	1. FC Magdeburg	(East Germany) Torsten Gütschow (18)
1990–91	FC Hansa Rostock (1)	Dynamo Dresden	FC Rot-Weiß Erfurt	(Germany) Torsten Gütschow (20)

== Performances ==
=== Performance by club ===
Clubs are named by the last name they used before the German reunification.

Club	Winners	Runners-up	Third Place
Berliner FC Dynamo^{1}	10	4	3
SG Dynamo Dresden^{2}	8	8	6
FC Vorwärts Frankfurt ^{3}	6	4	1
FC Carl Zeiss Jena ^{4}	3	9	5
1. FC Magdeburg	3	2	6
BSG Wismut Aue ^{5}	3	2	—
FC Rot-Weiß Erfurt ^{6}	2	2	1
BSG Chemie Leipzig ^{7}	2	1	4
BSG Sachsenring Zwickau ^{8}	2	—	3
BSG Turbine Halle ^{9}	2	—	—
F.C. Hansa Rostock ^{10}	1	4	—
FC Karl-Marx-Stadt	1	1	1
1. FC Lokomotive Leipzig ^{11}	—	3	8
Hallescher FC Chemie ^{12}	—	1	1
BSG Aktivist Senftenberg^{13}	—	1	1
SG Friedrichstadt	—	1	—
BSG Motor Dessau^{14}	—	—	1

Notes:

- ^{1} Played as part of sports club SC Dynamo Berlin until the founding of BFC Dynamo in 1966.
- ^{2} Played as SV Deutsche Volkspolizei Dresden until the founding of SG Dynamo Dresden in 1953.
- ^{3} In 1953, the club was picked up from Leipzig and moved to East Berlin to play as ZSK Vorwärts Berlin, later known as ASK Vorwärts Berlin and after that FC Vorwärts Berlin. In 1971, the club was picked up and moved again, this time from the capital to Frankfurt an der Oder in Bezirk Frankfurt. The team was known as FC Vorwärts Frankfurt.
- ^{4} Also known as BSG Motor Jena and SC Motor Jena.
- ^{5} Also known as SG Aue, BSG Pneumatik Aue, Zentra Wismut Aue, BSG Wismut Aue and SC Wismut Karl-Marx-Stadt. In 1954, the football department of BSG Wismut Aue was delegated to sports club SC Wismut Karl-Marx-Stadt in Chemnitz. In 1963, SC Wismut Karl-Marx Stadt merged with SC Motor Karl-Marx-Stadt to form SC Karl-Marx-Stadt, and the football department of SC Wismut Karl-Marx-Stadt was moved back to Aue and re-attached to BSG Wismut Aue. After German reunification in 1990, the club was renamed FC Wismut Aue before taking on its current form, FC Erzgebirge Aue in 1993.
- ^{6} Also known as SG Fortuna Erfurt, BSG KWU Erfurt, BSG Turbine Erfurt and SC Turbine Erfurt. In 1966, the football departments of SC Turbine Erfurt and BSG Optima Erfurt were merged under the name FC Rot-Weiß Erfurt.
- ^{7} Also known as SC Lokomotive Leipzig (not to be confused with 1. FC Lokomotive Leipzig) and FC Sachsen Leipzig.
- ^{8} Also known as SG Planitz, ZSG Horch Zwickau and BSG Motor Zwickau.
- ^{9} Also known as ZSG Union Halle.
- ^{10} Also known as SC Empor Rostock.
- ^{11} Also known as SC Rotation Leipzig and SC Leipzig (not to be confused with SC Lokomotive Leipzig).
- ^{12} Also known as SG Freiimfelde Halle.
- ^{13} Also known as Sportgemeinde Grube Marga , BSG Franz Mehring Grube, BSG Aktivist Ost Brieske and SC Aktivist Brieske-Senftenberg.
- ^{14} Also known as BSG Waggonbau Dessau and BSG Waggonfabrik Dessau.

=== Performance by city ===
City	Winners	Club(s)
Berlin	16	BFC Dynamo (10), FC Vorwärts Berlin (6)
Dresden	8	SG Dynamo Dresden (8)
Chemnitz	4	SC Wismut Karl-Marx-Stadt (3), FC Karl-Marx-Stadt (1)
Jena	3	FC Carl Zeiss Jena (3)
Magdeburg	3	1. FC Magdeburg (3)
Erfurt	2	FC Rot-Weiß Erfurt (2)
Leipzig	2	BSG Chemie Leipzig (2)
Zwickau	2	BSG Sachsenring Zwickau (2)
Halle	2	BSG Turbine Halle (2)
Rostock	1	F.C. Hansa Rostock (1)

== See also ==
- FDGB-Pokal
- DFV-Supercup
- List of German football champions
