= Dieter Erler =

German footballer

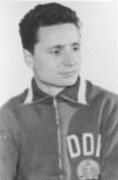
- Dieter Erler in 1964

Personal information
- Date of birth: 28 May 1939
- Place of birth: Glauchau, Germany
- Date of death: 10 April 1998 (aged 58)
- Place of death: Chemnitz, Germany
- Height: 1.78 m (5 ft 10 in)
- Position: Midfielder

Youth career
- 1953–1957: BSG Chemie Glauchau

Senior career*
Years	Team	Apps	(Gls)
1957–1958	BSG Wismut Gera	0	(0)
1959–1963	SC Wismut Karl-Marx-Stadt	112	(36)
1963–1972	SC Karl-Marx-Stadt	179	(18)
Total		291	(52)

International career
1959–1968	East Germany	47	(12)

Managerial career
- 1974–1975: FC Karl-Marx-Stadt
- * Club domestic league appearances and goals

Dieter Erler (28 May 1939 in Glauchau – 10 April 1998 in Chemnitz) was a German footballer.

He began his footballing career with BSG Chemie Glauchau in 1953. He was transferred to BSG Wismut Gera for the 1957 season and then after two seasons moved to sports club SC Wismut Karl-Marx-Stadt in January 1959. Erler was both a playmaker and a goalscoring midfielder.

In 1963, Erler moved to SC Karl-Marx-Stadt, where he played alongside the player described by Pelé as the best left-winger in the world at the time: Eberhard Vogel. In 1966–67 the team was crowned DDR-Oberliga champion.

Between 1959 and 1972 he played for SC Wismut Karl-Marx-Stadt and then FC Karl-Marx-Stadt. During his career he gained between 1959 and 1968 47 international caps and scored 12 goals for East Germany.

He was voted GDR footballer of the year in 1967.

== Career statistics ==
=== Club ===
As of 20 May 1972

Club	Season	League			Cup (Note: Includes FDGB-Pokal)		Continental (Note: Includes European Cup)		Total	
Club	Season	Division	Apps	Goals	Apps	Goals	Apps	Goals	Apps	Goals
BSG Wismut Gera	1958	DDR-Oberliga	–		2	0	–		2	0
BSG Wismut Gera	Total		–		2	0	–		2	0
SC Wismut Karl-Marx-Stadt	1959	DDR-Oberliga	26	7	6	1	3	0	35	8
SC Wismut Karl-Marx-Stadt	1960	DDR-Oberliga	22	5	3	1	3	0	31	6
SC Wismut Karl-Marx-Stadt	1961–62	DDR-Oberliga	39	16	2	1	–		41	17
SC Wismut Karl-Marx-Stadt	1962–63	DDR-Oberliga	25	8	3	1	–		28	9
SC Wismut Karl-Marx-Stadt	Total		112	36	14	4	6	0	132	40
FC Karl-Marx-Stadt	1963–64	DDR-Oberliga	26	4	1	0	–		27	4
FC Karl-Marx-Stadt	1964–65	DDR-Oberliga	23	3	1	0	–		24	3
FC Karl-Marx-Stadt	1965–66	DDR-Oberliga	26	2	3	0	–		29	2
FC Karl-Marx-Stadt	1966–67	DDR-Oberliga	21	5	2	0	–		23	15
FC Karl-Marx-Stadt	1967–68	DDR-Oberliga	18	0	1	0	2	0	21	0
FC Karl-Marx-Stadt	1968–69	DDR-Oberliga	17	3	3	0	–		20	3
FC Karl-Marx-Stadt	1969–70	DDR-Oberliga	23	0	4	1	–		27	1
FC Karl-Marx-Stadt	1970–71	DDR-Oberliga	–		1	0	–		1	0
FC Karl-Marx-Stadt	1971–72	DDR-Oberliga	25	1	4	0	–		29	1
FC Karl-Marx-Stadt	Total		179	18	20	1	2	0	201	19
Career total			291	54	34	5	8	0	333	59

=== International ===
As of 6 November 2015

East Germany national team
Year	Apps	Goals
1959	2	0
1960	6	1
1961	7	3
1962	8	4
1963	4	1
1964	1	0
1965	6	0
1966	6	3
1967	6	0
1968	1	0
Total	47	12

=== International goals ===
Scores and results list East Germany's goal tally first.

Goal	Date	Venue	Opponent	Score	Result	Competition
1.	30 October 1960	Ostseestadion, Rostock, East Germany	Finland	2–0	5–1	Exhibition game
2.	14 May 1961	Zentralstadion, Leipzig, East Germany	Netherlands	1–1	1–1	1962 FIFA World Cup qualification
3.	10 September 1961	Walter-Ulbricht-Stadion, East Berlin, East Germany	Hungary	1–1	2–3	1962 FIFA World Cup qualification
4.	22 October 1961	Olimpijski, Wrocław, Poland	Poland	1–1	1–3	Exhibition game
5.	3 May 1962	Lenin, Moscow, Soviet Union	Soviet Union	1–2	1–2	Exhibition game
6.	9 December 1962	Stade Mamadou Konaté, Bamako, Mali	Mali	1–0	1–2	Exhibition game
7.	9 December 1962	Stade Mamadou Konaté, Bamako, Mali	Mali	2–0	1–2	Exhibition game
8.	21 November 1962	Walter-Ulbricht-Stadion, East Berlin, East Germany	Czechoslovakia	1–0	2–1	1964 European Nations' Cup qualifying
9.	3 November 1963	Népstadion, Budapest, Hungary	Hungary	3–3	3–3	1964 European Nations' Cup qualifying
10.	4 September 1966	Dr.-Kurt-Fischer-Stadion, Chemnitz, East Germany	Egypt	2–0	6–0	Exhibition game
11.	4 September 1966	Dr.-Kurt-Fischer-Stadion, Chemnitz, East Germany	Egypt	3–0	6–0	Exhibition game
12.	11 September 1966	Georgi-Dimitroff-Stadion, Erfurt, East Germany	Poland	1–0	2–0	Exhibition game

== Honours ==
=== Club ===
SC Wismut Karl-Marx-Stadt

- DDR-Oberliga: 1959

=== Individual ===
- GDR Player of the Year: 1967
