= 1964–65 DDR-Oberliga =

East German football sports season

DDR-Oberliga
- Season: 1964–65
- Champions: ASK Vorwärts Berlin
- Relegated: SC Neubrandenburg; BSG Motor Steinach
- European Cup: ASK Vorwärts Berlin
- European Cup Winners' Cup: SC Aufbau Magdeburg
- Inter-Cities Fairs Cup: SC Leipzig
- Matches: 182
- Goals: 529 (2.91 per match)
- Top goalscorer: Bernd Bauchspieß (14)
- Total attendance: 1,767,500
- Average attendance: 9,712

The 1964–65 DDR-Oberliga was the 16th season of the DDR-Oberliga, the first tier of league football in East Germany.

The league was contested by fourteen teams. National People's Army club ASK Vorwärts Berlin won the championship, the club's fourth of six national East German championships all up.

Bernd Bauchspieß of BSG Chemie Leipzig was the league's top scorer with 14 goals, becoming the first player to finish as top scorer on three occasions. For the third time the title East German Footballer of the year was awarded, going to Horst Weigang of SC Leipzig.

On the strength of the 1964–65 title Vorwärts qualified for the 1965–66 European Cup where the club was knocked out by Manchester United in the first round. Seventh-placed club SC Aufbau Magdeburg qualified for the 1965–66 European Cup Winners' Cup as the seasons FDGB-Pokal winner and was knocked out by West Ham United in the quarter-finals. Fourth-placed SC Leipzig qualified for the 1965–66 Inter-Cities Fairs Cup where it was knocked out in the second round by Leeds United.

== Table ==
The 1964–65 season saw two newly promoted clubs, Dynamo Dresden and SC Neubrandenburg.

Pos	Team	Pld	W	D	L	GF	GA	GD	Pts	Qualification or relegation
1	ASK Vorwärts Berlin (C)	26	17	3	6	51	24	+27	37	Qualification to European Cup preliminary round
2	SC Motor Jena	26	14	4	8	41	27	+14	32	
3	BSG Chemie Leipzig	26	11	9	6	47	29	+18	31	
4	SC Leipzig	26	12	6	8	53	34	+19	30	Qualification to Inter-Cities Fairs Cup first round
5	SC Empor Rostock	26	13	2	11	37	33	+4	28	
6	BSG Lokomotive Stendal	26	9	8	9	47	42	+5	26	
7	SC Aufbau Magdeburg	26	9	7	10	35	35	0	25	Qualification to Cup Winners' Cup first round
8	BSG Motor Zwickau	26	9	6	11	36	46	−10	24	
9	BSG Wismut Aue	26	6	12	8	23	36	−13	24	
10	SG Dynamo Dresden	26	9	5	12	34	38	−4	23	
11	SC Karl-Marx-Stadt	26	8	7	11	36	41	−5	23	
12	SC Dynamo Berlin	26	8	6	12	27	37	−10	22	
13	SC Neubrandenburg (R)	26	7	6	13	34	58	−24	20	Relegation to DDR-Liga
14	BSG Motor Steinach (R)	26	8	3	15	28	49	−21	19	Relegation to DDR-Liga

(C) Champions; (R) Relegated

== Results ==
Home \ Away	MAG	CHM	DBE	DRE	ROS	KMS	LEI	LST	MJE	STE	ZWI	NEU	VBE	AUE
Aufbau Magdeburg		2–2	1–1	3–0	1–2	0–0	2–0	2–1	3–2	1–0	0–1	2–0	4–2	4–0
Chemie Leipzig	0–0		1–0	1–0	2–0	3–1	0–3	2–1	3–0	6–0	1–0	6–0	3–1	1–1
Dynamo Berlin	0–1	1–0		1–0	0–2	3–1	2–2	2–4	1–2	1–3	1–2	4–0	0–0	0–0
Dynamo Dresden	1–0	0–0	5–0		2–1	4–1	2–1	4–0	0–1	3–2	1–0	5–3	1–4	1–1
Empor Rostock	4–0	3–1	2–3	1–0		3–1	2–1	1–1	1–2	0–2	3–0	2–1	0–1	1–2
Karl-Marx-Stadt	2–1	4–4	0–2	1–1	1–2		1–0	1–1	1–0	4–1	3–0	5–1	1–0	0–0
SC Leipzig	6–2	1–3	3–0	2–1	2–0	3–1		1–1	1–0	4–1	5–1	2–1	1–2	2–2
Lokomotive Stendal	2–1	1–1	1–0	5–2	1–2	3–1	2–0		2–3	4–0	1–1	4–4	2–6	3–0
Motor Jena	3–1	2–1	0–0	2–0	3–1	3–0	1–1	1–1		3–0	1–0	3–0	1–0	3–1
Motor Steinach	1–1	1–1	1–2	2–0	2–0	2–1	0–4	1–0	2–1		3–2	0–1	0–2	1–2
Motor Zwickau	0–0	3–3	1–0	1–1	0–1	1–3	3–3	2–1	3–2	3–2		5–3	1–4	3–1
SC Neubrandenburg	3–2	1–1	1–2	2–0	4–2	0–0	1–1	1–1	2–1	1–0	1–0		1–3	1–1
Vorwärts Berlin	1–0	2–1	3–0	3–0	0–1	2–1	2–1	2–0	1–1	2–1	1–1	4–0		2–0
Wismut Aue	1–1	1–0	1–1	0–0	0–0	1–1	1–3	1–4	1–0	0–0	1–2	2–1	2–1	

Legend: Blue = home team win; Yellow = draw; Red = away team win.
