= Herbert Pankau =

East German footballer (1941–2025)

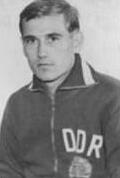
- Pankau in 1964

Personal information
- Date of birth: 4 October 1941
- Place of birth: Blankwitt, Gau Pomerania, Germany
- Date of death: 25 July 2025 (aged 83)
- Position: Midfielder

Youth career
- 1950–1960: BSG Einheit Grevesmühlen

Senior career*
Years	Team	Apps	(Gls)
1960–1971	Hansa Rostock (Note: "Empor Rostock" until 1965)	257	(30)
1971–1975	BSG Schiffahrt/ Hafen Rostock		

International career
1962–1967	East Germany	25	(4)
Medal record
Men's football
Representing Germany
Olympic Games
Bronze medal – third place	1964 Tokyo	Team competition
- * Club domestic league appearances and goals

Herbert Pankau (4 October 1941 – 25 July 2025) was a German footballer who played as a midfielder for Hansa Rostock. He scored 30 goals in 257 matches for Hansa Rostock in the East German top-flight. He won 25 caps for East Germany between 1962 and 1967. Pankau worked as an engineer after his football career. Pankau died on 25 July 2025, at the age of 83.

== Career statistics ==
=== Club ===
Appearances and goals by club, season and competition
Club	Season	League			FDGB-Pokal		Europe (Note: Includes Inter-Cities Fairs Cup)		Total	
Club	Season	Division	Apps	Goals	Apps	Goals	Apps	Goals	Apps	Goals
Hansa Rostock	1960	DDR-Oberliga	20	1	4	1	—		24	2
Hansa Rostock	1961–62	DDR-Oberliga	30	3	4	1	—		34	4
Hansa Rostock	1962–63	DDR-Oberliga	26	0	2	0	—		28	0
Hansa Rostock	1963–64	DDR-Oberliga	16	0	1	0	—		17	0
Hansa Rostock	1964–65	DDR-Oberliga	22	0	1	0	—		23	0
Hansa Rostock	1965–66	DDR-Oberliga	26	4	4	0	—		30	4
Hansa Rostock	1966–67	DDR-Oberliga	26	4	5	0	—		31	4
Hansa Rostock	1967–68	DDR-Oberliga	23	6	1	0	—		24	6
Hansa Rostock	1968–69	DDR-Oberliga	24	4	1	0	4	0	29	4
Hansa Rostock	1969–70	DDR-Oberliga	22	4	5	1	4	1	31	6
Hansa Rostock	1970–71	DDR-Oberliga	22	4	2	1	—		24	2
Hansa Rostock	Total		257	30	30	4	8	1	295	35

=== International ===
Appearances and goals by national team and year
National team	Year	Apps	Goals
East Germany	1962	1	0
East Germany	1963	2	0
East Germany	1964	7 (Note: Includes five appearances in 1964 Summer Olympics which are attributed only to the East Germany Olympic team in (East) German sources)	0
East Germany	1965	6	0
East Germany	1966	6	1
East Germany	1967	7	3
Total		29	4

Scores and results list East Germany's goal tally first, score column indicates score after each Pankau goal.

List of international goals scored by Herbert Pankau
No.	Date	Venue	Opponent	Score	Result	Competition
1	4 September 1966	Dr.-Kurt-Fischer-Stadion, Karl-Marx-Stadt, East Germany	Egypt	1–0	6–0	Friendly
2	11 October 1967	Zentralstadion, Leipzig, East Germany	Denmark	2–2	3–2	UEFA Euro 1968 qualifying
3	11 October 1967	Zentralstadion, Leipzig, East Germany	Denmark	3–2	3–2	UEFA Euro 1968 qualifying
4	18 November 1967	Walter-Ulbricht-Stadion, East Berlin, East Germany	Romania	1–0	1–0	Friendly
