= Kambozia =

Kambozia or Kambuzia (Persian: کامبوزیا) is an Iranian masculine given name. Notable people with the name include:

- Kambozia Jamali (1938–2010), Iranian football midfielder
- Kambuzia Partovi (1955–2020), Iranian film director and scriptwriter
