= BSG Chemie Leipzig =

BSG Chemie Leipzig refers to a number of different entities but associated with the same sports organisation due to its complicated history of mergers and name changes.

It can refer to:

- BSG Chemie Leipzig (1950), the first instance of a club under that name
- FC Sachsen Leipzig, a successor club to the original after several mergers, playing under this name between 1990 and 2009. Several other attempted phoenix clubs were attempted under similar names.
- BSG Chemie Leipzig (1997), a team founded by supporters in 1997 after financial trouble of Sachsen Leipzig, now the sole continuator of the original club's traditions.
