= 1963–64 DDR-Oberliga =

DDR-Oberliga
- Season: 1963–64
- Champions: BSG Chemie Leipzig
- Relegated: SC Chemie Halle; SC Turbine Erfurt
- European Cup: BSG Chemie Leipzig
- European Cup Winners' Cup: SC Aufbau Magdeburg
- Inter-Cities Fairs Cup: SC Leipzig
- Matches: 182
- Goals: 459 (2.52 per match)
- Top goalscorer: Gerd Backhaus (15)
- Total attendance: 1,910,000
- Average attendance: 10,495

The 1963–64 DDR-Oberliga was the 15th season of the DDR-Oberliga, the first tier of league football in East Germany.

The league was contested by fourteen teams. BSG Chemie Leipzig won the championship, the club's sole national East German championship. Football in Leipzig had been reorganised after the 1962–63 season with the two Oberliga clubs from the city, SC Lokomotive Leipzig and SC Rotation Leipzig, seeing their playing squads merged and then divided up again. The nominally best players were allocated to the new SC Leipzig club, later to become 1. FC Lok Leipzig. The nominally weaker players were allocated to BSG Chemie Leipzig which had its Oberliga place returned it had lost to SC Lokomotive in 1954. The fact that the nominally weaker Chemie squad won the league while SC Leipzig only came third is considered to be one of the greatest upsets in the history of East German football.

Football in Karl-Marx-Stadt, now Chemnitz, was reorganised, too with the football department of SC Wismut Karl-Marx-Stadt returning to Aue where it had played despite its name and joining BSG Wismut Aue again. SC Wismut Karl-Marx-Stadt then merged with SC Motor Karl-Marz-Stadt to form SC Karl-Marx-Stadt, now Chemnitzer FC.

Gerd Backhaus of BSG Lokomotive Stendal was the league's top scorer with 15 goals. For the second time the title East German Footballer of the year was awarded, going to Klaus Urbanczyk of SC Chemie Halle.

On the strength of the 1963–64 title Chemie Leipzig qualified for the 1964–65 European Cup where the club was knocked out by Vasas ETO Győr in the preliminary round. Eleventh-placed club SC Aufbau Magdeburg qualified for the 1964–65 European Cup Winners' Cup as the seasons FDGB-Pokal winner and was knocked out by Galatasaray S.K. in the first round. Third-placed SC Leipzig qualified for the 1964–65 Inter-Cities Fairs Cup where it was knocked out in the first round by Wiener Sportclub.

== Table ==
The 1963–64 season saw two newly promoted clubs, BSG Motor Steinach and BSG Lokomotive Stendal.

Pos	Team	Pld	W	D	L	GF	GA	GD	Pts	Qualification or relegation
1	BSG Chemie Leipzig (C)	26	13	9	4	38	21	+17	35	Qualification to European Cup preliminary round
2	SC Empor Rostock	26	13	7	6	40	23	+17	33	
3	SC Leipzig	26	12	8	6	34	27	+7	32	Qualification to Inter-Cities Fairs Cup first round
4	SC Karl-Marx-Stadt	26	10	9	7	31	29	+2	29	
5	ASK Vorwärts Berlin	26	10	6	10	45	36	+9	26	
6	SC Motor Jena	26	10	6	10	43	35	+8	26	
7	BSG Motor Steinach	26	8	9	9	30	36	−6	25	
8	SC Dynamo Berlin	26	9	6	11	35	34	+1	24	
9	BSG Lokomotive Stendal	26	9	5	12	31	34	−3	23	
10	BSG Wismut Aue	26	7	9	10	23	32	−9	23	
11	SC Aufbau Magdeburg	26	7	9	10	25	38	−13	23	Qualification to Cup Winners' Cup first round
12	BSG Motor Zwickau	26	7	8	11	37	41	−4	22	
13	SC Chemie Halle (R)	26	8	6	12	24	35	−11	22	Relegation to DDR-Liga
14	SC Turbine Erfurt (R)	26	4	13	9	23	38	−15	21	Relegation to DDR-Liga

(C) Champions; (R) Relegated

== Results ==
Home \ Away	MAG	CHH	CHL	DBE	ROS	KMS	LEI	LST	MJE	STE	ZWI	ERF	VBE	AUE
Aufbau Magdeburg		2–0	1–1	1–1	0–3	1–0	0–0	4–2	2–0	1–0	2–1	2–2	2–2	0–0
Chemie Halle	2–1		0–1	1–0	2–0	0–1	1–1	3–2	1–4	4–1	0–0	3–1	2–0	1–0
Chemie Leipzig	1–0	1–0		4–0	3–3	1–1	3–0	2–1	2–0	3–0	1–1	0–0	2–1	2–0
Dynamo Berlin	1–1	2–0	1–1		1–1	0–1	5–1	2–0	5–2	0–2	1–0	0–1	1–4	5–1
Empor Rostock	2–0	1–0	1–0	1–0		1–0	1–1	2–0	3–2	4–0	3–0	0–0	1–2	0–1
Karl-Marx-Stadt	1–0	1–1	0–0	2–1	1–3		0–3	2–2	0–0	1–1	5–1	2–0	0–2	2–1
SC Leipzig	4–0	2–0	1–2	1–0	1–0	1–1		2–1	1–0	4–1	2–0	4–2	1–1	1–0
Lokomotive Stendal	1–0	3–0	1–1	2–1	2–1	4–1	3–0		0–1	2–0	1–0	1–0	0–0	0–0
Motor Jena	4–1	1–1	3–1	1–2	1–3	0–2	0–0	4–1		0–1	4–1	6–0	3–2	3–2
Motor Steinach	2–2	6–2	1–1	4–1	1–0	0–1	0–0	0–0	2–1		2–2	0–0	1–0	1–0
Motor Zwickau	6–0	3–0	1–2	-:+ (Note: The match between Motor Zwickau and Dynamo Berlin (originally 3–0) was scored 0–0 and Dynamo won because Zwickau used the player Eberhard Franz without permission.)	1–1	2–2	3–0	3–1	1–1	2–2		1–1	3–0	2–0
Turbine Erfurt	1–2	0–0	0–2	1–1	1–1	3–2	1–1	1–0	0–0	1–0	1–2		4–4	0–0
Vorwärts Berlin	0–0	1–0	2–0	1–4	1–2	1–2	0–2	2–1	0–1	2–2	5–0	3–1		4–1
Wismut Aue	1–0	0–0	2–1	0–0	2–2	0–0	2–0	2–0	1–1	2–0	4–1	1–1	0–5	

Legend: Blue = home team win; Yellow = draw; Red = away team win.
