= 1949–50 DDR-Oberliga =

DDR-Oberliga
- Season: 1949–50
- Champions: ZSG Horch Zwickau
- Relegated: ZSG Anker Wismar; BSG Vorwärts Schwerin
- Matches played: 182
- Goals scored: 668 (3.67 per match)
- Top goalscorer: Heinz Satrapa (23)
- Total attendance: 1,837,500
- Average attendance: 10,096

The 1949–50 DDR-Oberliga, playing as the DS-Liga in its first season as the DDR, the German Democratic Republic was only formed after the start of the season, was the inaugural season of the DDR-Oberliga, the first tier of league football in East Germany.

The league was contested by 14 teams and ZSG Horch Zwickau won the championship. It was Zwickau's second and last East German championship, having previously won the 1948 edition under the name SG Planitz.

Heinz Satrapa of ZSG Horch Zwickau was the league's top scorer with 23 goals.

== Table ==
The 1949–50 season was the inaugural season of the league.

Pos	Team	Pld	W	D	L	GF	GA	GD	Pts	Qualification or relegation
1	ZSG Horch Zwickau (C)	26	20	1	5	69	27	+42	41	League champions
2	SG Friedrichstadt (Note: SG Friedrichstadt was disbanded at the end of season and scheduled to be replaced by BSG VVB Tabak Dresden but the latter was unable to compete in the league in 1950–51 because it lost a large number of players to clubs from West Germany. The team was than replaced by SG Volkspolizei Dresden)	26	18	3	5	87	29	+58	39	Club dissolved
3	BSG Waggonbau Dessau	26	17	3	6	67	36	+31	37	
4	BSG KWU Erfurt	26	15	5	6	58	30	+28	35	
5	ZSG Union Halle	26	13	5	8	56	38	+18	31	
6	BSG Franz Mehring Marga	26	13	5	8	49	48	+1	31	
7	BSG Märkische Volksstimme Babelsberg	26	10	4	12	42	66	−24	24	
8	ZSG Industrie Leipzig	26	8	6	12	38	45	−7	22	
9	Einheit Meerane	26	9	3	14	38	56	−18	21	
10	BSG Hans Wendler Stendal	26	7	5	14	31	45	−14	19	
11	SG Gera Süd	26	6	7	13	34	54	−20	19	
12	ZSG Altenburg (Note: ZSG Altenburg defeated ZSG Anker Wismar 3–2 in the relegation play-off)	26	6	5	15	34	50	−16	17	
13	ZSG Anker Wismar (R)	26	6	5	15	35	60	−25	17	Relegation to DDR-Liga
14	BSG Vorwärts Schwerin (R)	26	4	3	19	30	84	−54	11	Relegation to DDR-Liga

Source: RSSSF.com
Rules for classification: 1) Points;
(C) Champions; (R) Relegated

== Results ==
Home \ Away	ALT	ANK	MEE	FMM	FRI	GER	STN	ZWI	IND	ERF	BAB	DES	HAL	VSW
ZSG Altenburg		2–1	5–1	2–3	2–0	1–2	0–1	0–1	3–0	1–1	1–4	2–2	1–2	2–1
Anker Wismar	1–1		1–1	2–0	1–4	1–1	2–1	1–3	2–2	2–1	1–0	2–2	2–4	0–1
Einheit Meerane	3–1	2–1		1–1	3–4	4–1	2–1	2–4	0–1	0–3	0–1	1–4	2–1	2–1
Franz Mehring Marga	5–2	3–2	5–1		4–0	2–2	2–1	0–3	1–0	1–1	4–3	2–3	1–0	2–1
SG Friedrichstadt	4–0	11–0	1–2	8–0		3–1	6–1	1–5	3–0	0–0	1–1	4–0	1–0	5–0
Gera Süd	1–1	0–2	0–0	1–2	1–5		4–0	1–2	2–1	0–2	2–1	1–1	2–2	5–1
Hans Wendler Stendal	0–1	5–1	0–1	2–2	1–3	2–1		0–2	2–2	3–0	4–1	2–1	1–1	1–1
Horch Zwickau	1–0	3–0	4–1	2–0	1–0	3–0	3–0		4–3	2–3	6–0	0–1	1–2	7–1
Industrie Leipzig	1–0	3–2	3–2	1–1	1–1	4–0	0–0	2–0		0–4	2–2	1–2	1–2	4–0
KWU Erfurt	2–1	3–0	3–0	1–0	0–1	1–1	+:- (Note: The result of the match between BSG KWU Erfurt and Hans Wendler Stendal (3–4) has been declared invalid. It was scored with a goalless win for Erfurt.)	2–5	3–0		5–0	4–0	2–2	5–2
MV Babelsberg	2–1	2–1	3–4	3–1	2–12	2–1	3–1	1–1	3–1	2–1		1–3	2–0	2–5
Motor Dessau	3–1	3–1	2–1	3–1	2–3	5–2	3–0	0–2	3–1	2–0	5–1		0–1	10–0
Union Halle	3–3	2–0	1–0	3–4	1–4	6–1	3–0	4–0	2–0	3–5	3–0	1–4		6–0
Vorwärts Schwerin	5–0	0–6	4–2	0–2	0–2	0–1	0–2	2–4	1–4	2–6	0–0	1–3	1–1	

Legend: Blue = home team win; Yellow = draw; Red = away team win.

== Name changes ==
East German clubs were subject to frequent name changes in this era. The following 1949–50 DDR-Oberliga clubs changed their name during the off-season and in the season.

1948–49 name	1949–50 name	1950–51 name
SG Planitz	ZSG Horch Zwickau	BSG Motor Zwickau
Waggonbau Dessau		Motor Dessau
Eintracht Erfurt	KWU Erfurt	Turbine Erfurt
Union Halle		Turbine Halle
Franz Mehring Marga		Aktivist Brieske-Ost
SG Babelsberg	Märkische Volksstimme Babelsberg	Rotation Babelsberg
Industrie Leipzig		Chemie Leipzig
SG Meerane	Einheit Meerane	Fortschrit Meerane
Hans Wendler Stendal		Lokomotive Stendal
SG Gera		Motor Gera
SG Altenburg-Nord	ZSG Altenburg	Stahl Altenburg
Wismar-Süd	Anker Wismar	
SG Schwerin	Vorwärts Schwerin	
