= Hans-Ulrich Grapenthin =

German footballer (born 1943)

- Grapenthin as part of Carl Zeiss Jena in 1983

Personal information
- Date of birth: 2 September 1943 (age 83)
- Place of birth: Wolgast, Germany
- Height: 1.88 m (6 ft 2 in)
- Position: Goalkeeper

Youth career
- Motor Wolgast

Senior career*
Years	Team	Apps	(Gls)
1966–1985	Carl Zeiss Jena	308	(0)

International career
1975–1981	East Germany	21	(0)
Medal record
Representing East Germany
Men's Football
Gold medal – first place	1976 Montreal	Team competition
- * Club domestic league appearances and goals

Hans-Ulrich Grapenthin (also spelled Hans-Ullrich Grapenthin, born 2 September 1943) is a German former footballer who played as a goalkeeper for FC Carl Zeiss Jena in 308 Oberliga matches. He was an East Germany international between 1975 and 1981, winning 21 caps, and was part of the gold-medal winning squad at the 1976 Olympics. He was East German Footballer of the Year in 1980 and 1981.
