= Rolf Sperling =

German diver

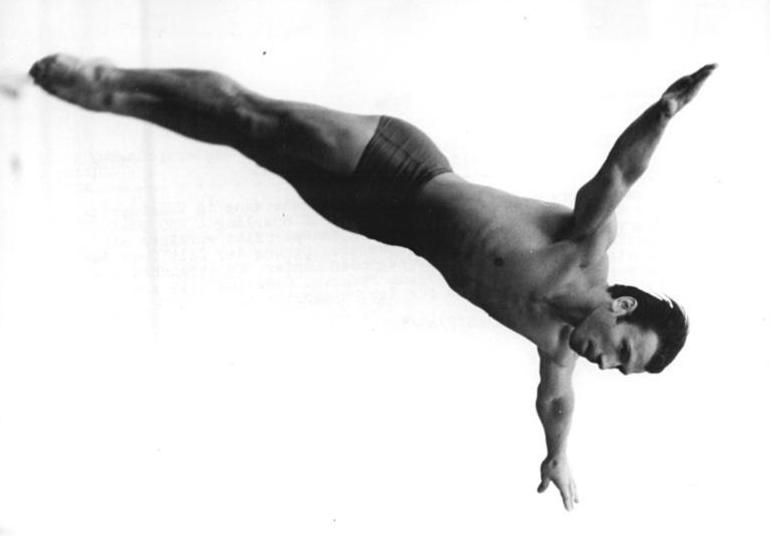
- Sperling in 1968

Personal information
- Nationality: German
- Born: 25 April 1940 (age 86) Halle, Germany

Sport
- Sport: Diving
Medal record
Men's diving
Representing East Germany
European Championships
Silver medal – second place	1962 Leipzig	10 m platform

Rolf Sperling (born 25 April 1940) is a German diver. He competed at the 1960 Summer Olympics, the 1964 Summer Olympics and the 1968 Summer Olympics.
