= Rudolf Krause (footballer) =

German footballer and manager

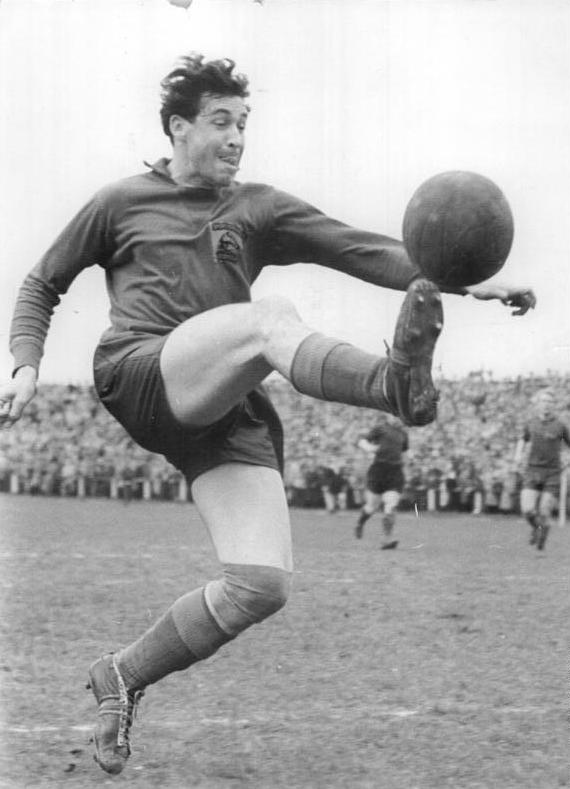
- Krause in 1958

Personal information
- Date of birth: 21 January 1927
- Place of birth: Leipzig, Germany
- Date of death: 12 December 2003 (aged 76)
- Place of death: Leipzig, Germany
- Position: Striker

Senior career*
Years	Team	Apps	(Gls)
1946–1947	SG Stötteritz		
1947–1949	SG Probstheida		
1949–1952	Chemie Leipzig		
1952–1953	Vorwärts Berlin	5	(1)
1953–1954	Chemie Leipzig	28	(12)
1954–1955	Lokomotive Leipzig	20	(7)
1955	Lok Weimar	12	(8)
1956–1962	Lokomotive Leipzig	127	(42)

International career
1953–1956	East Germany	2	(0)

Managerial career
- 1961–1963: Stahl Lippendorf
- 1963–1965: SC Leipzig
- 1965–1966: Chemie Zeitz
- 1968–1975: East Germany Youth
- 1976–1978: East Germany U-21
- 1979–1980: East Germany Olympic
- 1980–1981: East Germany U-21
- 1982–1983: East Germany
- * Club domestic league appearances and goals

Rudolf Krause (21 January 1927 – 12 December 2003) was a German footballer and coach who won a silver medal as manager of East Germany at the 1980 Summer Olympics.

Krause played as a striker in the Oberliga and scored 111 goals in the East German top flight. The prolific forward also won two caps for East Germany in the mid-1950s.
