= Gholam Hossein Nourian =

Iranian footballer

Personal information
- Date of birth: 16 March 1935 (age 91)
- Position: Midfielder

International career
Years	Team	Apps	(Gls)
1959–1964	Iran	11	(0)

Gholam Hossein Nourian (Persian: غلام‌حسین نوریان, born 16 March 1935) is an Iranian footballer. He competed in the men's tournament at the 1964 Summer Olympics.
