= Manfred Walter =

German footballer

- Walter with the East Germany national team in 1967

Personal information
- Date of birth: 31 July 1937 (age 89)
- Place of birth: Wurzen, Germany
- Position: Defender

Senior career*
Years	Team	Apps	(Gls)
- BSG Chemie Leipzig
Total		243	(9)

International career
mid 1960s	East Germany	16	
Medal record
Men's football
Representing Germany
Olympic Games
Bronze medal – third place	1964 Tokyo	Team competition
- * Club domestic league appearances and goals

Manfred Walter (born 31 July 1937 in Wurzen) is a German former footballer who played as a defender.

He won a bronze medal with the East German Olympic team in the 1964 Football tournament of the Tokyo Games. For the full national team Walter made 16 appearances in the mid 1960s.

In the East German Oberliga the defender scored nine goals in 243 matches. In 1963–64 Walter won the East German championship with this club BSG Chemie Leipzig.
