= Károly Sós =

Hungarian footballer and manager

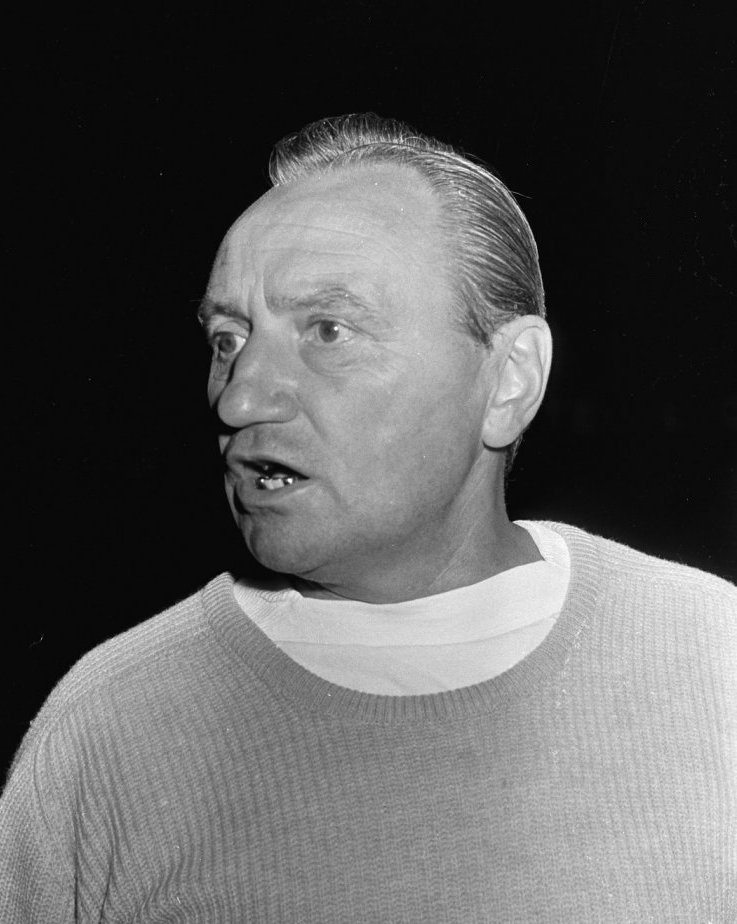
- Károly Sós in 1967

Personal information
- Date of birth: 5 April 1909
- Place of birth: Budapest, Austria-Hungary
- Date of death: 3 August 1991 (aged 82)
- Place of death: Budapest, Hungary
- Position: Midfielder

Senior career*
Years	Team	Apps	(Gls)
1927–1929	Vasas SC		
1929–1932	Nemzeti SC		
1932–1933	Attila FC		
1933–1935	US Saint-Servan		
1935–1937	Olympique Alès		
1937	FC Bern		
1938	FK Banská Bystrica		
1938–1944	Gamma FC		

Managerial career
- 1942–1947: Gamma FC
- 1947–1948: Szombathelyi Haladás
- 1948: Újpesti TE
- 1948–1950: Szombathelyi Haladás
- 1950–1951: Salgótarjáni BTC
- 1952: Dorogi Tárna
- 1953–1957: Ferencvárosi TC
- 1957–1960: Bp. Honvéd SE
- 1961–1967: East Germany
- 1968–1969: Hungary
- * Club domestic league appearances and goals

Károly Sós (5 April 1909 – 3 August 1991), was a Hungarian footballer and manager. After playing for various clubs as a midfielder he became a coach, most notably with Ferencvárosi TC, Bp. Honvéd SE, East Germany and Hungary.
