= Mohammad Bayati =

Iranian football goalkeeper

Personal information
- Full name: Mohammad Bayati
- Date of birth: April 27, 1932 (age 94)
- Place of birth: Iran
- Height: 1.70 m (5 ft 7 in)
- Position: Goalkeeper
| 1958–1965 | Taj | | |

International career
| Years | Team | Apps | (Gls) |
| 1958–1964 | Iran | 8 | (0) |

Managerial career
- 1970–1975: Tractor Sazi

Mohammad Bayati (Persian: محمد بیاتی; born May 5, 1932) is an Iranian football goalkeeper who played for Iran in the 1964 Summer Olympics . He also played for Taj SC.

== Record at Olympic Games ==
| National team | Year | Apps | Goals |
|---|---|---|---|
| Iran | 1964 | 1 | 0 |
