= Günter Hoffmann (cyclist) =

German cyclist (born 1939)

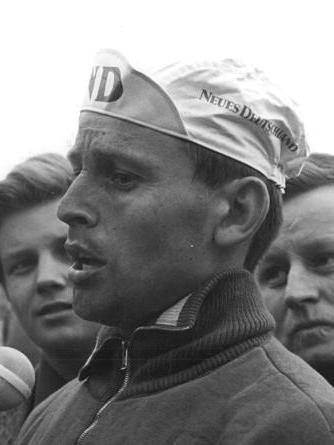
- Günter Hoffmann in 1967

Personal information
- Born: 8 February 1939 (age 87) Guben, Germany
- Height: 1.75 m (5 ft 9 in)
- Weight: 65 kg (143 lb)

Sport
- Sport: Cycling
- Club: ASG Vorwärts Leipzig

Günter Hoffmann (born 8 February 1939) is a retired German cyclist. His sporting career began with ASK Vorwärts Leipzig. He competed at the 1964 and 1968 Summer Olympics in the 100 km team time trial and finished in 14th and 13th place, respectively. In 1964 he also finished 78th in the Olympic road race and second in the Peace Race.

Hoffmann was part of the group of athletes who launched in 2012 the "Initiative for Peace in the World".
