= Carlos Albert (footballer) =

Mexican footballer (1943–2026)

Personal information
- Full name: Carlos Albert Llorente
- Date of birth: 10 July 1943
- Place of birth: Mexico City, Mexico
- Date of death: 3 November 2026 (aged 83)
- Position: Defender

Senior career*
Years	Team	Apps	(Gls)
1961–1971	Necaxa		

International career
1967–1968	Mexico	3	(0)
- * Club domestic league appearances and goals

Carlos Albert Llorente (10 July 1943 – 3 November 2026) was a Mexican footballer and sports journalist who played as a defender for the Necaxa. He made three appearances for the Mexico national team. He competed in the men's tournament at the 1964 Summer Olympics.

== Career ==
After his retirement from playing, Albert worked as a football commentator on television and wrote columns in newspapers. His media career lasted 43 years before he retired in October 2021.

== Death ==
Albert died on 3 November 2026, at the age of 83.
