= Ebrahim Latifi =

Iranian footballer

Personal information
- Date of birth: 27 January 1939 (age 87)
- Position: Midfielder

International career
Years	Team	Apps	(Gls)
1964–1965	Iran	5	(0)

Ebrahim Latifi (Persian: ابراهیم لطیفی, born 27 January 1939) is an Iranian footballer. He competed in the men's tournament at the 1964 Summer Olympics.
