= Hossein Khodaparast =

Iranian footballer (1938–2021)

Personal information
- Full name: Mohammad Hossein Khodaparast
- Date of birth: 27 May 1938
- Place of birth: Tabriz, Iran
- Date of death: 26 March 2021 (aged 82)
- Place of death: Tabriz, Iran
- Position: Midfielder

International career
Years	Team	Apps	(Gls)
1964	Iran	1	(0)

Mohammad Hossein Khodaparast (Persian: محمدحسین خداپرست, 27 May 1938 – 26 March 2021) was an Iranian footballer. He competed in the men's tournament at the 1964 Summer Olympics.
