= Abdollah Saedi =

Iranian footballer

Personal information
- Date of birth: 24 August 1942
- Date of death: 1977 (aged 34–35)
- Position: Midfielder

International career
Years	Team	Apps	(Gls)
1963–1968	Iran	5	(0)

Abdollah Saedi (Persian: عبدالله ساعدی, 24 August 1942 – 1977) was an Iranian footballer. He competed in the men's tournament at the 1964 Summer Olympics.
