= José Luis Aussín =

Mexican footballer (born 1942)

Personal information
- Full name: José Luis Aussín Suárez
- Date of birth: 20 January 1942 (age 84)
- Place of birth: Orizaba, Veracruz, Mexico

International career
Years	Team	Apps	(Gls)
1965	Mexico	3	(1)

José Luis Aussín Suárez (born 20 January 1942) is a Mexican former footballer. He competed in the men's tournament at the 1964 Summer Olympics.
