= Carlos Gutiérrez (footballer, born 1939) =

Mexican footballer

Personal information
- Full name: Carlos José Gutiérrez Padilla
- Date of birth: 31 March 1939 (age 87)

International career
Years	Team	Apps	(Gls)
- Mexico

Carlos José Gutiérrez Padilla (born 31 March 1939) is a Mexican former footballer. He competed in the men's tournament at the 1964 Summer Olympics.
