= Ali Mirzaei (footballer) =

Iranian footballer

Personal information
- Date of birth: 9 October 1942 (age 84)
- Height: 1.71 m (5 ft 7 in)
- Position: Defender

Senior career*
Years	Team	Apps	(Gls)
- Paykan F.C.

International career
1964	Iran	1	(0)
- * Club domestic league appearances and goals

Ali Mirzaei (Persian: علی میرزایی, born 9 October 1942) is a retired Iranian football player. He played one match against Germany at the 1964 Summer Olympics, where Iran lost 0–4. Domestically he played for Paykan F.C.
