= Immo Rittmeyer =

German cyclist

Personal information
- Born: 6 January 1936 Rackwitz, Germany
- Died: 8 January 2024 (aged 88)

Cycling career
- Sport: Cycling

Immo Rittmeyer (6 January 1936 – 8 January 2024) was a German former cyclist. His sporting career began with SC Karl-Marx-Stadt. He competed in the individual road race and team time trial events at the 1964 Summer Olympics.

Rittmeyer died on 8 January 2022, at the age of 88.
