= Miguel Galván (footballer) =

Mexican footballer (born 1937)

Personal information
- Date of birth: 23 June 1937 (age 89)

International career
Years	Team	Apps	(Gls)
- Mexico

Miguel Galván (born 23 June 1937) is a Mexican former footballer. He competed in the men's tournament at the 1964 Summer Olympics.
