= 1965–66 DDR-Oberliga =

DDR-Oberliga
- Season: 1965–66
- Champions: FC Vorwärts Berlin
- Relegated: FC Rot-Weiss Erfurt; 1. FC Magdeburg
- European Cup: FC Vorwärts Berlin
- European Cup Winners' Cup: BSG Chemie Leipzig
- Inter-Cities Fairs Cup: 1. FC Lokomotive Leipzig
- Matches: 182
- Goals: 485 (2.66 per match)
- Top goalscorer: Henning Frenzel (22)
- Total attendance: 1,885,700
- Average attendance: 10,361

The 1965–66 DDR-Oberliga was the 17th season of the DDR-Oberliga, the first tier of league football in East Germany.

The league was contested by fourteen teams. National People's Army club FC Vorwärts Berlin won the championship, the club's fifth of six national East German championships all up.

Henning Frenzel of 1. FC Lokomotive Leipzig was the league's top scorer with 22 goals, while Jürgen Nöldner of FC Vorwärts Berlin won the seasons East German Footballer of the year award.

On the strength of the 1965–66 title Vorwärts qualified for the 1966–67 European Cup where the club was knocked out by Górnik Zabrze in the first round. Seventh-placed club BSG Chemie Leipzig qualified for the 1966–67 European Cup Winners' Cup as the seasons FDGB-Pokal winner and was knocked out by Standard Liège in the second round. Third-placed 1. FC Lokomotive Leipzig qualified for the 1966–67 Inter-Cities Fairs Cup where it was knocked out in the quarter finals by Kilmarnock F.C.

In December 1965 and January 1966 East German football saw a major restructuring with the introduction of football clubs (FC) as separate entities from the sports clubs (SC). With one exception, this only affected clubs playing in the DDR-Oberliga at the time. As a result of the restructuring, ASK Vorwärts Berlin became FC Vorwärts Berlin, SC Motor Jena became FC Carl Zeiss Jena, SC Leipzig became 1. FC Lokomotive Leipzig, SC Empor Rostock became FC Hansa Rostock, SC Karl-Marx-Stadt became FC Karl-Marx-Stadt, SC Dynamo Berlin became Berliner FC Dynamo, SC Chemie Halle became Hallescher FC Chemie, SC Turbine Erfurt became FC Rot-Weiss Erfurt and SC Aufbau Magdeburg became SC Magdeburg and then 1. FC Magdeburg. Outside the DDR-Oberliga, TSC Berlin became 1. FC Union Berlin. TSC Berlin was only playing in the second tier DDR-Liga at the time. Hower, 1. FC Union Berlin finished the 1965-66 DDR-Liga Nord on first place and was promoted to the 1966-67 DDR-Oberliga. With the exception of FC Vorwärts Berlin, all football clubs retained their name until the disbanding of the Oberliga in 1991 and, in some cases, beyond that.

== Table ==
The 1965–66 season saw two newly promoted clubs, Hallescher FC Chemie and FC Rot-Weiss Erfurt.

Pos	Team	Pld	W	D	L	GF	GA	GD	Pts	Qualification or relegation
1	FC Vorwärts Berlin (C)	26	15	4	7	44	27	+17	34	Qualification to European Cup preliminary round
2	FC Carl Zeiss Jena	26	14	4	8	45	24	+21	32	
3	1. FC Lokomotive Leipzig	26	13	2	11	50	41	+9	28	Qualification to Inter-Cities Fairs Cup first round
4	F.C. Hansa Rostock	26	11	6	9	41	34	+7	28	
5	SG Dynamo Dresden	26	11	6	9	34	31	+3	28	
6	BSG Wismut Aue	26	11	6	9	33	33	0	28	
7	FC Karl-Marx-Stadt	26	12	4	10	29	33	−4	28	
8	BSG Chemie Leipzig	26	9	8	9	32	32	0	26	Qualification to Cup Winners' Cup first round
9	Berliner FC Dynamo	26	11	3	12	42	32	+10	25	
10	BSG Motor Zwickau	26	9	6	11	28	35	−7	24	
11	Hallescher FC Chemie	26	7	9	10	26	33	−7	23	
12	BSG Lokomotive Stendal	26	10	2	14	36	49	−13	22	
13	FC Rot-Weiss Erfurt (R)	26	8	3	15	26	42	−16	19	Relegation to DDR-Liga
14	1. FC Magdeburg (R)	26	7	5	14	19	39	−20	19	Relegation to DDR-Liga

(C) Champions; (R) Relegated

== Results ==
Home \ Away	BFC	CZJ	CHM	DRE	HFC	HRO	KMS	LLE	LST	MAG	ZWI	RWE	VBE	AUE
BFC Dynamo		2–2	2–0	1–2	3–0	2–0	1–0	5–3	3–1	5–0	2–0	3–0	0–1	0–1
Carl Zeiss Jena	2–0		1–0	0–0	2–1	5–0	3–0	2–4	3–0	3–0	3–0	2–0	2–0	2–1
Chemie Leipzig	2–1	1–1		3–0	1–0	2–2	1–0	0–3	2–2	1–0	0–0	4–2	2–1	1–1
Dynamo Dresden	2–1	1–0	1–1		3–1	0–3	5–0	1–2	3–1	2–1	0–0	4–0	1–2	2–0
Hallescher FC Chemie	2–1	1–3	2–0	1–1		2–0	0–0	2–4	2–3	0–0	0–0	1–1	1–0	1–1
Hansa Rostock	3–1	0–1	2–2	4–0	1–1		2–2	2–0	2–0	0–1	1–2	2–0	1–1	3–2
Karl-Marx-Stadt	0–0	2–1	2–0	1–2	2–1	2–1		3–0	2–0	2–0	1–0	4–2	0–1	1–0
Lokomotive Leipzig	4–0	1–0	0–4	0–0	2–0	0–4	0–1		5–0	3–1	5–0	3–2	0–1	6–2
Lokomotive Stendal	2–1	2–0	3–2	2–0	0–1	1–2	1–1	1–0		2–0	2–0	2–0	3–5	3–1
1. FC Magdeburg	0–2	0–3	1–1	2–1	3–1	0–0	2–1	1–1	3–1		0–1	1–0	0–3	0–0
Motor Zwickau	3–2	2–1	0–1	0–2	1–1	3–0	3–0	3–2	4–2	1–2		1–0	1–1	0–1
Rot-Weiß Erfurt	1–0	1–0	1–0	0–0	0–1	1–3	4–1	0–1	3–1	2–1	2–0		1–2	0–0
Vorwärts Berlin	0–3	2–0	2–0	4–1	1–1	0–3	3–0	4–0	1–0	2–0	3–3	1–2		2–0
Wismut Aue	1–1	3–3	2–1	1–0	0–2	3–0	0–1	2–1	3–1	1–0	1–0	4–1	2–1	

Legend: Blue = home team win; Yellow = draw; Red = away team win.

== Attendances ==
No.	Club	Average
1	Dynamo Dresden	25,615
2	Karl-Marx-Stadt	14,846
3	Chemie Leipzig	13,308
4	Hallescher	12,000
5	Motor Zwickau	9,846
6	Erfurt	9,462
7	Carl Zeiss Jena	9,308
8	Hansa Rostock	8,615
9	Lokomotive Leipzig	8,385
10	Wismut Aue	7,846
11	Magdeburg	7,769
12	Vorwärts Berlin	6,385
13	BFC Dynamo	5,923
14	Lokomotive Stendal	4,846
