= Efrain Loza =

Mexican footballer (1939-2017)

Personal information
- Date of birth: 16 January 1939
- Date of death: 30 August 2017 (aged 78)

International career
Years	Team	Apps	(Gls)
- Mexico

Efrain Loza (16 January 1939 – 30 August 2017) was a Mexican footballer. He competed in the men's tournament at the 1964 Summer Olympics.
