= Christiane Lanzke =

German diver and actress

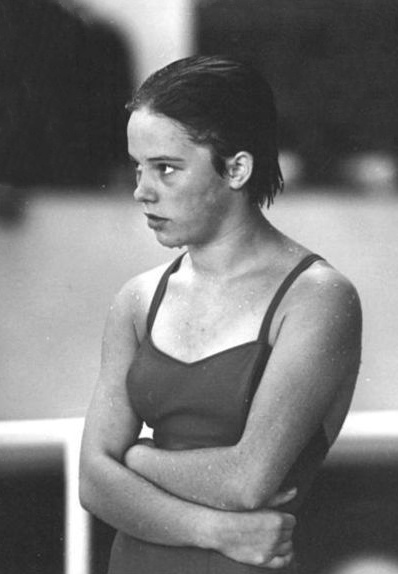
- Christiane Lanzke in 1964

Personal information
- Born: 15 March 1947 Potsdam, Soviet occupation zone in Germany
- Died: 2005 (aged 57–58) Rostock, Germany
- Height: 1.56 m (5 ft 1 in)
- Weight: 50 kg (110 lb)

Sport
- Sport: Diving
- Club: SC Empor Rostock
Medal record
Representing East Germany
European Championships
Silver medal – second place	1962 Leipzig	Springboard

Christiane Lanzke (15 March 1947 – 2005) was a German diver and actress. She competed in the 10 m platform and 3 m springboard at the 1964 Summer Olympics and finished in fifth and tenth place, respectively. She won a silver medal in the springboard event at the 1962 European Aquatics Championships.

She retired from competitions in 1966 due to a shoulder injury. The same year she began her career as actress playing the lead role of a diver in the film Das Mädchen auf dem Brett (The girl on the board). Despite injury she performed all dives in the film. Later she studied acting at the German Film School in Potsdam and worked on stage in Halle and Greifswald. She also took small roles in the films Unterwegs zu Lenin (1970), Tscheljuskin (1970), Du und ich und Klein-Paris (1970), Mein lieber Robinson (1971) and Der Mann, der nach der Oma kam (1971).

Lanzke drowned herself in the Baltic Sea near Rostock in 2005.
