= Raúl Chávez (footballer) =

Mexican footballer (1939–2010)

Personal information
- Full name: Raúl Chávez de la Rosa
- Date of birth: 4 March 1939
- Date of death: 4 November 2010 (aged 71)
- Position: Forward

International career
| Years | Team | Apps | (Gls) |
| 1963 | Mexico | 2 | (0) |

Raúl Chávez de la Rosa (4 March 1939 – 4 November 2010) was a Mexican footballer. He competed in the men's tournament at the 1964 Summer Olympics.
