= Kambozia Jamali =

Iranian footballer (1938–2010)

Personal information
- Full name: Kambozia Jamali
- Date of birth: 9 July 1938
- Place of birth: Khoramabad, Iran
- Date of death: 24 May 2010 (aged 71)
- Place of death: Tehran, Iran
- Height: 1.66 m (5 ft 5 1/2 in)
- Position: Midfielder

Senior career*
Years	Team	Apps	(Gls)
1956–1968	Taj SC		

International career
1959–1964	Iran	14	(1)
- * Club domestic league appearances and goals

Kambozia Jamali (Persian: کامبوزیا جمالی, 9 July 1938 – 24 May 2010) was an Iranian football midfielder who played for Iran in the 1964 Summer Olympics. He also played for Taj SC.

== Record at Olympic Games ==
National team	Year	Apps	Goals
Iran	1964	3	0
