= Peter Rock (footballer) =

German footballer (1941–2021)

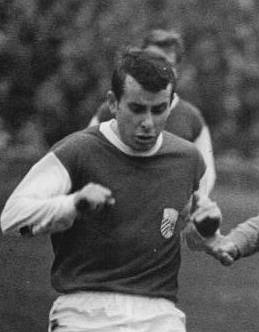
- Peter Rock in 1966

Personal information
- Date of birth: 16 December 1941
- Place of birth: Rudolstadt, Germany
- Date of death: 20 June 2021 (aged 79)
- Place of death: Jena, Germany

Senior career*
| Years | Team | Apps | (Gls) |
| | Motor / CZ Jena | 254 | |

International career
| 1967-1971 | East Germany | | |
Medal record
Men's football
Representing Germany
Olympic Games
| Bronze medal – third place | 1964 Tokyo | Team competition |
- * Club domestic league appearances and goals

Peter Rock (16 December 1941 – 20 June 2021) was a German football player who competed in the 1964 Summer Olympics. He was born in Rudolstadt on 16 December 1941. The Motor / CZ Jena player won 10 caps for East Germany between 1967 and 1971. For his club he played 254 matches in the East German top-flight. Rock died in Jena on 20 June 2021, at the age of 79.
