= BSG Chemie Leipzig (1950) =

- Full name: Betriebssportgemeinschaft Chemie Leipzig e.V.
- Founded: 1950
- Dissolved: 1990 (became FC Sachsen Leipzig)
- Ground: Georg-Schwarz-Sportpark
- Capacity: 10,889
- Website: http://www.chemie-leipzig.de
Home colours	Away colours

BSG Chemie Leipzig was a German football club from the Leutzsch district of Leipzig, Saxony. The prewar identity of the club is rooted in the establishment of Britannia Leipzig in 1899 and its successor TuRa Leipzig. During the socialist era, the traditions of the club were continued in the East German teams BSG Chemie Leipzig and SC Lokomotive Leipzig before the emergence of FC Sachsen Leipzig following German reunification, which continued the clubs traditions.

== History ==
=== Predecessor sides ===
After World War I, a 1919 merger between Britannia Leipzig and FC Hertha 05 Leipzig (FC Hohenzollern 1905 Leipzig from 1905 to 1918) created Leipziger Sportverein 1899. Only Britannia was of any note competitively, playing in senior level city competition from 1908 to 1910. The club re-emerged there in 1922 as SV 1899, but finished at the bottom of the table the next season. Predecessor Sportverein für Turnen- und Rasensport Leipzig was formed in 1932 and six years later, in 1938, joined with 1899 to create Turn und Rasensportverein 1899 Leipzig.

German football was reorganized in 1933 by Nazi Germany into 16 premier divisions. Newcomer SV TuRa 32 joined the top flight Gauliga Sachsen in 1936 and following its merger with SV 1899 in November 1938, continued in the top flight as SV TuRa 1899. The team escaped relegation in 1939 only because of the restructuring of the Gauliga Sachsen into two divisions. In 1940, the club made its only appearance in play for the Tschammerpokal, predecessor to the modern-day DFB-Pokal (German Cup), and was put out in the second qualifying round. By 1942, the club's continued lacklustre performance saw them in last place and relegated from the top flight. They earned a return in 1943, but World War II made play untenable and the Gauliga Sachsen broke up into a number of small local city-based leagues. TuRa merged with Sportvereinigung Leipzig to briefly form the wartime side Kriegspielgemeinschaft TuRa/SpVgg Leipzig.

=== Postwar play in East Germany ===
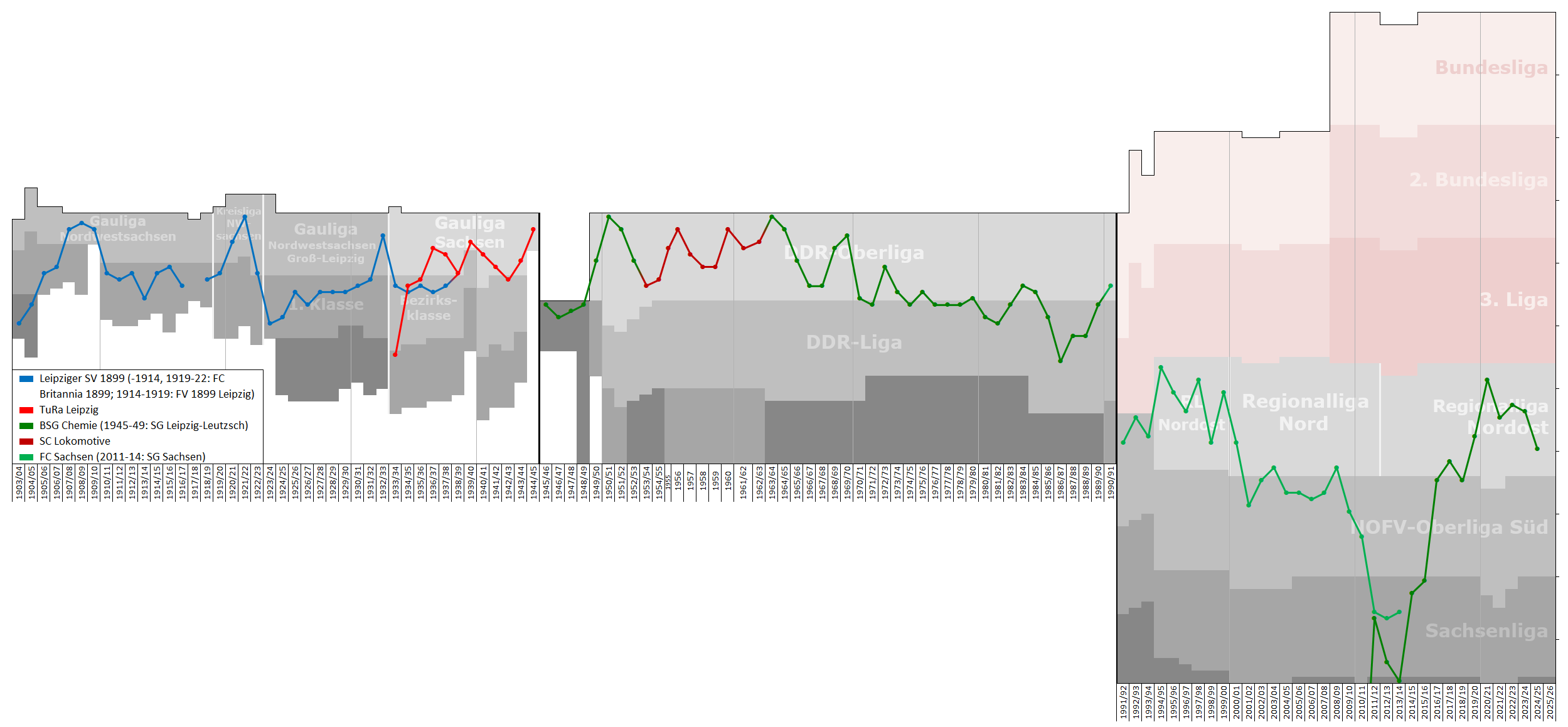
Historical chart of Chemie Leipzig league performance

Following the war, Germany was divided into eastern and western zones of occupation by the victorious allies, and eventually, a separate football competition emerged in Soviet-occupied East Germany. New sports and football clubs were formed, often built around the cores of pre-war clubs: SG Leipzig-Leutzsch was the closest descendant of the old TuRa side. In March 1949, Leutzsch, SG Lindenau-Hafen, SG Lindenau-Aue, SG Leipzig-Mitte, and SG Böhlitz-Ehrenberg were united to form ZSG Industrie Leipzig. In August the next year, the club was renamed BSG Chemie Leipzig. They promptly finished atop the Oberliga der DDR and continued to deliver good results over the next few seasons. Chemie was dissolved in September 1954 when its players were assigned to SC Lokomotive Leipzig (not to be confused with 1. FC Lokomotive Leipzig). Over the next decade, SC Lok was a middling Oberliga side with their best results being third-place finishes in 1956 and 1960.

In 1963, East German football was re-organized with a view towards fostering the development of talent for the country's national side. This time SC Lok was disassembled to help re-create the club BSG Chemie Leipzig. Once again, the remade side captured the Oberliga title before following with a string of uneven results that saw the club moving between first and second division play into the early 1980s. After a two-year stint in the Oberliga in 1983–85, Chemie settled into the tier II DDR-Liga.

=== Post-reunification ===
The reunification of East and West Germany saw significant change in football in the eastern half of the country. At the end of May 1990, the club was renamed FC Grün-Weiß Leipzig and quickly merged with SV Chemie Böhlen (formerly BSG Chemie Böhlen) to create FC Sachsen in August of that year and took up play in the Oberliga Nordost which was the top-flight successor of the DDR-Oberliga in 1990/91 at first and later in the early 1990s would become a third-tier league in the unified Germany on former GDR soil and including former East and West Berlin.

== Notable players ==
=== Internationals ===
The following players were capped by East Germany while playing for Chemie Leipzig:

- Bernd Bauchspieß – 1 cap
- Rainer Baumann – 2 caps
- Günter Busch – 2 caps
- Bernd Dobermann – 2 caps
- Werner Eilitz – 8 caps
- Dieter Fischer – 4 caps
- Heinz Fröhlich – 2 caps
- Rudolf Krause – 2 caps
- Horst Scherbaum – 5 caps
- Lothar Vetterke – 1 cap
- Manfred Walter – 16 caps
- Arno Zerbe – 1 cap

== Honours ==
=== Leagues ===
- DDR-Oberliga
  - Champions: 1950-51, 1963-64
  - Runners'up: 1953-54

=== Cups ===
- FDGB-Pokal
  - Winners: 1957, (Note: As SC Lokomotive Leipzig.) 1965–66
  - Runners-up: 1958, 1965–66
