= 1962–63 DDR-Oberliga =

DDR-Oberliga
- Season: 1962–63
- Champions: SC Motor Jena
- Relegated: Dynamo Dresden; SC Aktivist Brieske-Senftenberg
- European Cup: SC Motor Jena
- European Cup Winners' Cup: BSG Motor Zwickau
- Matches played: 182
- Goals scored: 541 (2.97 per match)
- Top goalscorer: Peter Ducke (19)
- Total attendance: 1,802,900
- Average attendance: 9,906

The 1962–63 DDR-Oberliga was the 14th season of the DDR-Oberliga, the first tier of league football in East Germany.

The league was contested by fourteen teams. SC Motor Jena won the championship, the club's first-ever national East German championship. The club would go on to win two more, then under the name of FC Carl Zeiss Jena.

Peter Ducke of SC Motor Jena was the league's top scorer with 19 goals. For the first time the title East German Footballer of the year was awarded, going to Manfred Kaiser of SC Wismut Karl-Marx-Stadt.

On the strength of the 1962–63 title Motor Jena qualified for the 1963–64 European Cup where the club was knocked out by Dinamo Bucharest in the preliminary round. Seventh-placed club BSG Motor Zwickau qualified for the 1963–64 European Cup Winners' Cup as the seasons FDGB-Pokal winner and was knocked out by MTK Budapest in the second round after having received a bye in the first round.

== Table ==
The 1962–63 season saw two newly promoted clubs, SC Karl-Marx-Stadt and Dynamo Dresden.

Pos	Team	Pld	W	D	L	GF	GA	GD	Pts	Qualification or relegation
1	SC Motor Jena (C)	26	17	5	4	49	22	+27	39	Qualification to European Cup preliminary round
2	SC Empor Rostock	26	13	7	6	42	24	+18	33	
3	ASK Vorwärts Berlin	26	11	9	6	41	34	+7	31	
4	SC Wismut Karl-Marx-Stadt	26	10	8	8	43	42	+1	28	
5	SC Lokomotive Leipzig	26	12	3	11	38	35	+3	27	
6	SC Chemie Halle	26	9	7	10	38	40	−2	25	
7	BSG Motor Zwickau	26	10	5	11	38	41	−3	25	Qualification to Cup Winners' Cup second round
8	SC Turbine Erfurt	26	10	4	12	45	45	0	24	
9	SC Rotation Leipzig	26	8	8	10	29	35	−6	24	
10	SC Dynamo Berlin	26	8	7	11	37	32	+5	23	
11	SC Aufbau Magdeburg	26	10	3	13	44	46	−2	23	
12	SC Karl-Marx-Stadt	26	6	11	9	39	44	−5	23	
13	Dynamo Dresden (R)	26	8	6	12	36	45	−9	22	Relegation to DDR-Liga
14	SC Aktivist Brieske-Senftenberg (R)	26	6	5	15	22	56	−34	17	Relegation to DDR-Liga

(C) Champions; (R) Relegated

== Results ==
Home \ Away	ABS	MAG	CHH	DBE	DRE	ROS	LOK	MJE	KMS	ZWI	ROT	ERF	VBE	WIS
Aktivist Brieske-Senftenberg		2–1	2–0	2–2	1–0	0–1	1–3	0–2	1–1	2–1	0–1	0–0	0–1	1–3
Aufbau Magdeburg	1–2		5–0	0–2	2–1	3–0	4–3	-:+ (Note: The matches Aufbau Magdeburg–Motor Jena (originally 2–1) and Chemie Halle–Aufbau Magdeburg (originally 1:1) were each given a 0-0 goal and a win for Jena and Halle respectively, because Magdeburg did not provide evidence from a sports doctor.)	2–2	2–4	4–1	1–2	1–3	5–1
Chemie Halle	4–0	3–0		3–0	2–1	1–0	1–0	0–3	0–1	3–0	0–0	5–4	3–1	2–0
Dynamo Berlin	5–0	0–1	1–1		4–2	0–3	2–0	1–2	4–0	1–2	2–0	3–0	1–1	1–3
Dynamo Dresden	7–0	3–5	3–2	1–0		1–1	2–0	3–2	1–1	3–1	1–0	3–2	1–1	0–1
Empor Rostock	1–2	2–0	1–0	2–1	2–0		0–0	2–0	3–0	2–2	3–0	3–1	1–1	5–0
Lokomotive Leipzig	2–0	2–4	4–0	2–1	0–0	0–3		3–2	3–0	1–1	2–0	3–1	0–3	1–0
Motor Jena	4–1	4–0	1–1	1–0	4–0	2–1	1–0		2–1	1–0	4–0	2–1	2–1	4–0
Karl-Marx-Stadt	5–0	1–1	1–1	2–1	2–0	1–1	2–5	1–1		4–0	1–2	4–5	0–2	2–2
Motor Zwickau	6–3	+:-	1–0	2–2	4–0	0–0	3–0	2–2	2–0		1–2	0–2	0–1	3–2
Rotation Leipzig	3–1	0–0	5–1	1–1	3–0	2–0	0–2	1–1	1–1	2–2		0–0	2–4	0–1
Turbine Erfurt	2–1	1–2	2–1	1–1	0–0	4–1	0–1	2–0	0–2	3–0	1–2		6–1	3–1
Vorwärts Berlin	0–0	2–0	3–2	0–0	3–3	1–2	3–1	0–1	1–1	0–0	2–1	2–1		2–2
Wismut Karl-Marx-Stadt	0–0	5–0	2–2	0–1	2–0	2–2	1–0	1–1	3–3	2–1	0–0	6–1	3–2	

Legend: Blue = home team win; Yellow = draw; Red = away team win.
