= Klaus Urbanczyk =

German footballer (born 1940)

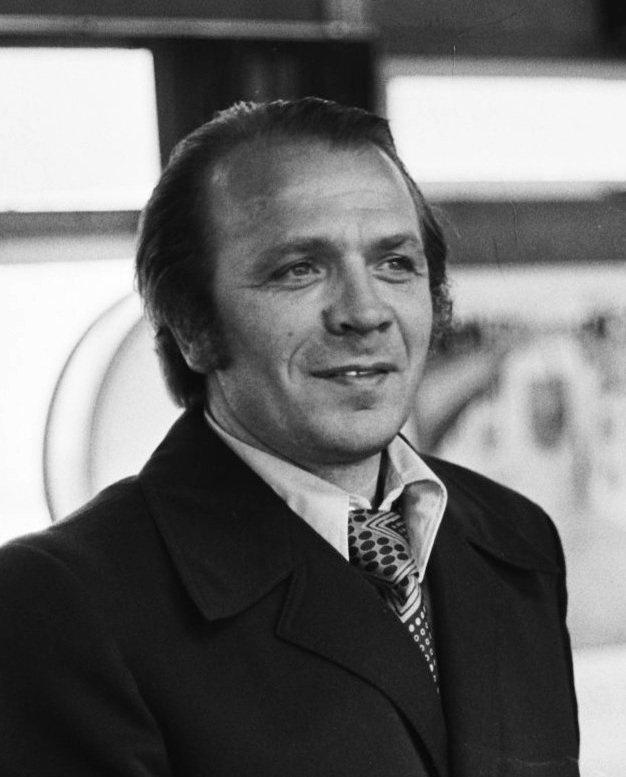
- Urbanczyk in 1978

Personal information
- Date of birth: 4 June 1940 (age 86)
- Place of birth: Halle (Saale), Germany
- Position: Defender

Youth career
- 1948–1960: Turbine Halle

Senior career*
Years	Team	Apps	(Gls)
1960–1972	Chemie Halle		

International career
1961–1969	East Germany	34	(0)

Managerial career
- 1973–1975: HFC Chemie
- 1976–1982: 1. FC Magdeburg
- 1982–1984: HFC Chemie
- 1992–1994: Hallescher FC
- 1994–1996: FSV Lok Altmark Stendal
Medal record
Men's football
Representing Germany
Olympic Games
Bronze medal – third place	1964 Tokyo	Team competition
- * Club domestic league appearances and goals

Klaus Urbanczyk (born 4 June 1940), nicknamed Banne, is a German former football player and manager. He made 34 appearances for the East Germany national team.

== Career ==
Born in Halle (Saale), Urbanczyk began his football career at Turbine Halle in 1948. Beginning in 1960, he played for the team, which was renamed Chemie Halle and later Hallescher FC Chemie – in the DDR-Oberliga. His first Oberliga match was against Wismut Karl-Marx-Stadt on 20 March 1960, as a right midfielder. During his career, however, he transitioned to play the position of right defender. He appeared in 250 East German top flight matches (12 goals).

At the beginning of the 1960s, Urbanczyk was believed to be one of the best right defenders in the world, on account of his speed and his slide-tackling skills. He played for East Germany between 1961 and 1969.

In a survey among managers of the magazine "Deutsches Sportecho", Urbanczyk was voted the best right defender of the 1962–63 season. At the Olympic Games in Tokyo in 1964, Urbanczyk's popularity rose further. He was one of the key figures of East Germany's team (representing the United Team of Germany) that reached the semi-final of the tournament. In the semi-final against the Czechoslovakia, Urbanczyk collided with his own goalkeeper Jürgen Heinsch and suffered a complicated knee injury, including torn cruciates. East Germany lost the semi-final, but won the bronze medal against Egypt. In the same year, Urbanczyk won the East German Sportsperson of the Year award – the only time that a footballer was given an individual award. Urbanczyk also won the East German Footballer of the Year award in 1964.

In 1971, Urbanczyk was part of the HFC Chemie team that were involved in the Hotel 't Silveren Seepaerd fire while staying in Eindhoven for a UEFA Cup tie. Urbanczyk rescued several people and suffered severe injuries.

After ending his active career due to his injuries sustained in the fire, Urbanczyk enjoyed success managing several Oberliga clubs, starting at HFC Chemie, then FC Rot-Weiß Erfurt. From 1976 to 1982 he was manager of 1. FC Magdeburg, winning the FDGB-Pokal in 1978 and 1979. His team was represented in the European competitions in every season, reaching the quarter-finals three times. After managing several other clubs, he returned to his home club in 1992, now called Hallescher FC, to manage them until 1994. Later, he enjoyed a small measure of success at FSV Lok Altmark Stendal who he guided to the DFB-Pokal quarter-final in 1995.

== Personal life ==
Klaus Urbanczyk is married and the father of two daughters.
