= Otto Fräßdorf =

German footballer (1942–2025)

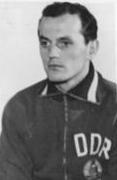
- Fräßdorf in 1964

Personal information
- Date of birth: 5 February 1942
- Place of birth: Magdeburg, Gau Magdeburg-Anhalt, Germany
- Date of death: 8 October 2025 (aged 83)
- Height: 1.72 m (5 ft 8 in)
- Positions: Defender; forward

Youth career
- 1954–1960: BSG TuS Fortschritt Magdeburg

Senior career*
Years	Team	Apps	(Gls)
1960–1971	FC Vorwärts Berlin	183	(31)
Total		183	(31)

International career
1963–1970	East Germany	33	(4)

Managerial career
- 1978–1984: Vorwärts Dessau
Medal record
Men's football
Representing Germany
Olympic Games
Bronze medal – third place	1964 Tokyo	Team competition
- * Club domestic league appearances and goals

Otto Fräßdorf (5 February 1942 – 8 October 2025) was a German footballer.

== Career ==
Fräßdorf played 183 East German top-flight matches for FC Vorwärts Berlin. Initially a forward, he was later turned into a defender. For the East Germany national team Fräßdorf scored 4 goals in 33 appearances.

== Death ==
Fräßdorf died on 8 October 2025, at the age of 83.

== Career statistics ==
Scores and results list East Germany's goal tally first, score column indicates score after each Fräßdorf goal.

List of international goals scored by Otto Fräßdorf
No.	Date	Venue	Opponent	Score	Result	Competition
1	17 December 1963	Bogyoke Aung San Stadium, Yangon, Burma	Burma		5–1	Friendly
2	12 January 1964	Sugathadasa Stadium, Colombo, Ceylon	Ceylon		12–1	Friendly
3	2 July 1966	Zentralstadion, Leipzig, East Germany	Chile		5–2	Friendly
4	23 October 1966	Central Lenin Stadium, Moscow, USSR	Soviet Union		2–2	Friendly
