= SV 08 Steinach =

German football club

- Full name: Sportverein 1908 Steinach e.V.
- Founded: 1908
- Ground: Stadion am Fellberg
- Capacity: 6,000
- League: Landesklasse Thüringen 3 (VII)
- 2015–16: 7th
Home colours	Away colours

SV Steinach is a German association football club that plays in Steinach, a town 75 km south of Erfurt in Thuringia.

== History ==
This small local club was founded on 4 November 1908 as FC Steinach. Play was suspended through World War I and after the war, in 1919, they merged with another football side, FC Teutonia. The following year, the winter sports club Wintersportverein Steinach also joined and remained part of the club until 1926. From 1933 to 1936, Steinach played in the Gauliga Mitte, one of sixteen regional leagues formed through the reorganization of German football under the Third Reich. They finished second in this league in 1933–34, were relegated in 1937 and returned for a season in 1939 before sitting out for the duration of World War II. The club resumed play in East Germany's Bezirksliga Suhl in 1952 as BSG Motor Steinach. Through the late 50s and early 60s the team bounced up and down between the second and third division DDR-Liga and II. DDR-Liga. They earned promotion to the top-flight DDR Oberliga where they played the 1964 and 1965 seasons before falling back. With German re-unification in 1990 the club took on the name SV 08 Steinach and played in the Thüringenliga (VI) until 2009 when it dropped down to the Bezirksliga. Since 2010 it has played in the tier seven Landesklasse.

Steinach has a number of other sports departments and offers its members winter sports, bowling, table tennis, volleyball, gymnastics and Tae Kwon Do.
