= Wolfgang Barthels =

German footballer

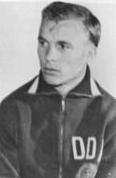
- Barthels in 1964

Personal information
- Full name: Wolfgang Barthels
- Date of birth: 23 November 1940 (age 85)
- Place of birth: Marienburg, West Prussia, Germany (present-day Poland)
- Position: Striker

Youth career
- 1950–1953: Traktor Plaue
- 1954: Einheit Rostock
- 1954–1959: SC Empor Rostock

Senior career*
Years	Team	Apps	(Gls)
1959–1970	F.C. Hansa Rostock	221	(45)
1970–1975	Schiffahrt/Hafen Rostock		

International career
1964–1965	East Germany	2	(2)
Medal record
Men's football
Representing Germany
Olympic Games
Bronze medal – third place	1964 Tokyo	Team competition
- * Club domestic league appearances and goals

Wolfgang Barthels (born 23 November 1940 in Marienburg) is a former German footballer.

== Club career ==
Barthels played more than 220 East German top-flight matches.

== International career ==
He won 2 caps for the East Germany national team.
