= Dieter Engelhardt (footballer) =

German footballer (1938–2018)

- Engelhardt with the East Germany national team in 1964

Medal record

Men's football

Representing Germany

Olympic Games
Bronze medal – third place	1964 Tokyo	Team competition

Dieter Engelhardt (18 August 1938 – 30 November 2018) was a German football player who competed in the 1964 Summer Olympics.

== Club career ==
He scored 31 goals in the East German top-flight in 237 matches for 1. FC Lokomotive Leipzig and its predecessors.

== International career ==
Engelhardt won three caps for the East German national team. His only goal came in a 6-0 win against Egypt in Karl-Marx-Stadt. His only match for the East German Olympic team which was part of the United Team of Germany and represented it at the 1964 football competition in Japan came in the group match against Iran.
