= Werner Unger =

German footballer (1931–2002)

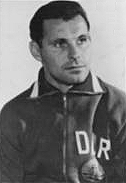
- Unger, 1964

Personal information
- Date of birth: 4 May 1931
- Place of birth: Strehla, Germany
- Date of death: 15 March 2002 (aged 70)

Senior career*
Years	Team	Apps	(Gls)
- BSG Motor Zwickau
- FC Vorwärts Berlin

International career
1954-1964	East Germany		
Medal record
Men's football
Representing Germany
Olympic Games
Bronze medal – third place	1964 Tokyo	Team competition
- * Club domestic league appearances and goals

Werner Unger (4 May 1931 in Strehla – 15 March 2002) was a German football player who competed in the 1964 Summer Olympics.

He played in the DDR-Oberliga for BSG Motor Zwickau and FC Vorwärts Berlin.

In the East Germany national football team he appeared seven times between 1954 and 1964.
