= Gerhard Körner =

German football player and manager (1941–2025)

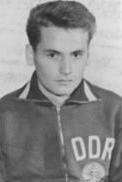

Personal information
- Date of birth: 20 September 1941
- Place of birth: Zwickau, Germany
- Date of death: July 2025 (aged 83)
- Position: Midfielder

Senior career*
Years	Team	Apps	(Gls)
1960–1971	Vorwärts Berlin	276	(50)
Total		276	(50)

International career
1962–1969	East Germany	33	(4)

Managerial career
- 1992: 1. FC Union Berlin
Medal record
Men's football
Representing Germany
Olympic Games
Bronze medal – third place	1964 Tokyo	Team competition
- * Club domestic league appearances and goals

Gerhard Körner (20 September 1941 – July 2025) was a German football player and manager.

He played 276 matches in the Oberliga and scored 50 goals for Vorwärts Berlin and FC Vorwärts Frankfurt/Oder respectively.

Gerhard Körner won 33 caps for East Germany. He died in July 2025, at the age of 83.
