= Gerd Backhaus =

German footballer

- Backhaus in 1967

Personal information
- Date of birth: 8 September 1942 (age 84)
- Place of birth: Germany
- Position: Striker

Senior career*
| Years | Team | Apps | (Gls) |
| 1960–1975 | BSG Lokomotive Stendal | 312 | (137) |
| Total | | 312 | (137) |

International career
| 1963–1966 | East Germany | 3 | (2) |
Medal record
Men's football
Representing Germany
Olympic Games
| Bronze medal – third place | 1964 Tokyo | Team competition |
- * Club domestic league appearances and goals

Gerd Backhaus (born 8 September 1942) is a German former professional footballer who played as a striker.

In all his senior playing career Backhaus wore the jersey of BSG Lokomotive Stendal.

He scored in each of his first two international appearances for East Germany.

== Career statistics ==
=== International goals ===
| # | Date | Venue | Opponent | Score | Result | Competition |
|---|---|---|---|---|---|---|
| 1. | 17 December 1963 | Bogyoke Aung San Stadium, Yangon, Burma | Burma | 1–5 | Won | Friendly |
| 2. | 12 January 1964 | Sugathadasa Stadium, Colombo, Ceylon | Ceylon | 1–12 | Won | Friendly |
Correct as of 6 October 2015
