= Footballer of the Year (Germany) =

Award of a German organization of sports journalists

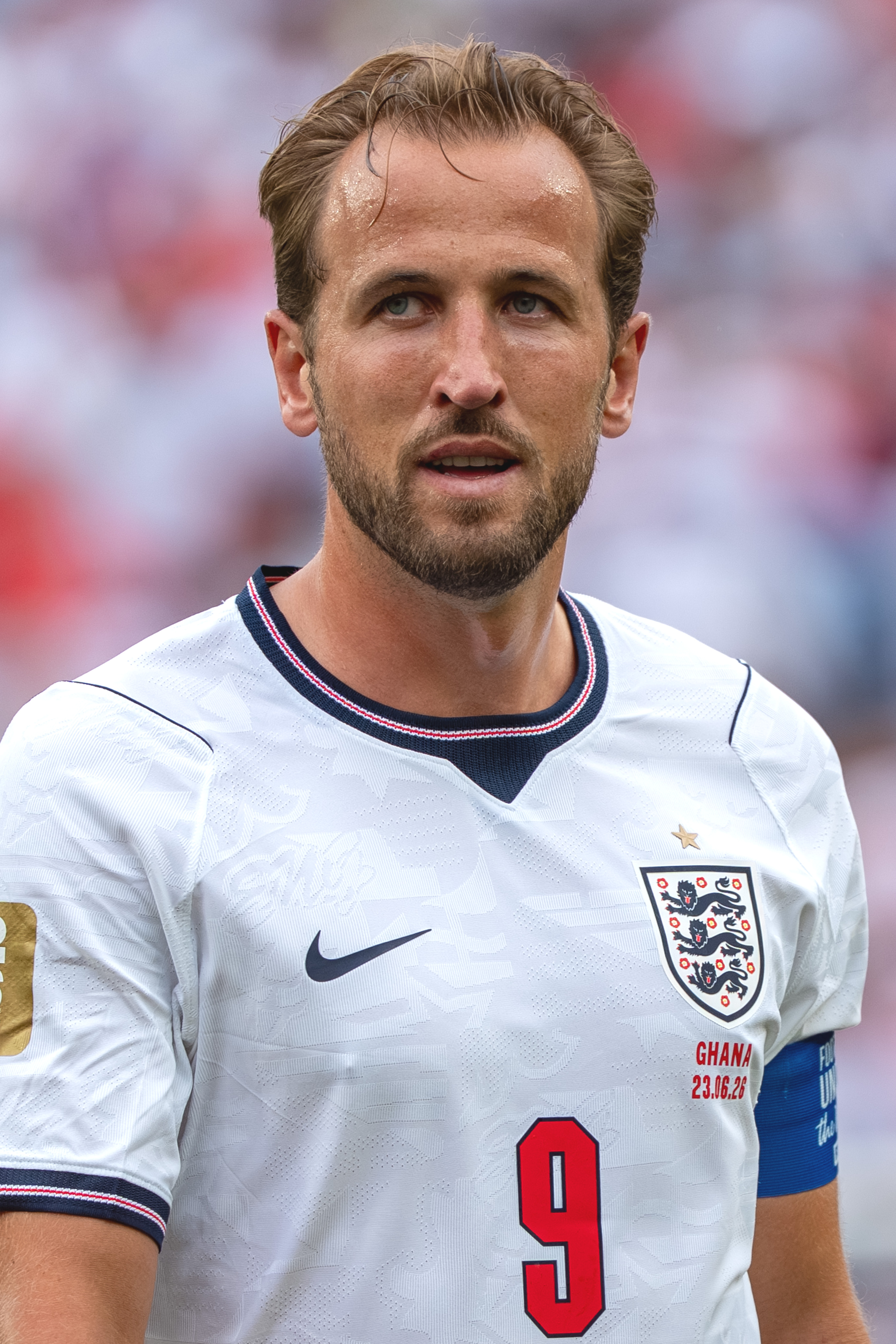
- Harry Kane won the award in 2026
- Country: Germany
- Formerly called: West Germany Footballer of the Year (1960–1991)
- First award: 1960
- Current holder: Harry Kane (2026)

Highlights
- Most awards: Franz Beckenbauer (4)

Women's Footballer of the Year
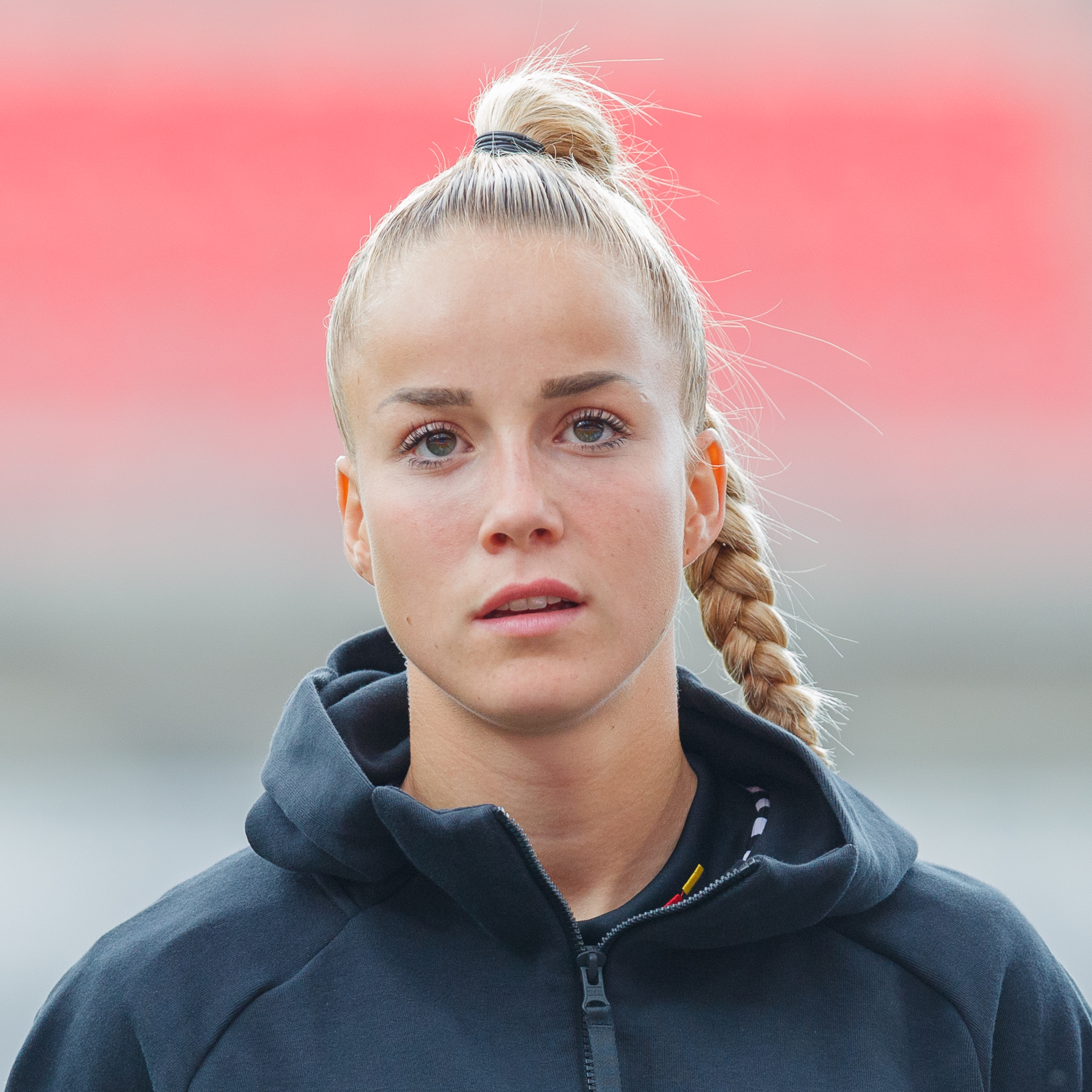
- Giulia Gwinn won the award in 2026
- Country: Germany
- First award: 1996
- Current holder: Giulia Gwinn (2026)

Highlights
- Most awards: Birgit Prinz (8)

The title Footballer of the Year (German: Fußballer des Jahres) has been awarded in West Germany from 1960 to 1990 and Germany since 1991. Eligible are German players as well as non-German players playing in Germany.

In 1996, the title Women's Footballer of the Year (German: Fußballerin des Jahres) was awarded for the first time. Both awards are determined by a poll of German football journalists from the Association of German Sports Journalists (Verband Deutscher Sportjournalisten) and the publication kicker.

The current titleholders are Harry Kane of Bayern Munich and Giulia Gwinn of Bayern Munich. In 2004, Brazilian Aílton became the first foreign player to attain the honour.

== Footballer of the Year ==
Year	Player	Club
1960	Uwe Seeler	Hamburger SV
1961	Max Morlock	1. FC Nürnberg
1962	Karl-Heinz Schnellinger	1. FC Köln
1963	Hans Schäfer	1. FC Köln
1964	Uwe Seeler	Hamburger SV
1965	Hans Tilkowski	Borussia Dortmund
1966	Franz Beckenbauer	Bayern Munich
1967	Gerd Müller	Bayern Munich
1968	Franz Beckenbauer	Bayern Munich
1969	Gerd Müller	Bayern Munich
1970	Uwe Seeler	Hamburger SV
1971	Berti Vogts	Borussia Mönchengladbach
1972	Günter Netzer	Borussia Mönchengladbach
1973	Günter Netzer	Borussia Mönchengladbach
1974	Franz Beckenbauer	Bayern Munich
1975	Sepp Maier	Bayern Munich
1976	Franz Beckenbauer	Bayern Munich
1977	Sepp Maier	Bayern Munich
1978	Sepp Maier	Bayern Munich
1979	Berti Vogts	Borussia Mönchengladbach
1980	Karl-Heinz Rummenigge	Bayern Munich
1981	Paul Breitner	Bayern Munich
1982	Karlheinz Förster	VfB Stuttgart
1983	Rudi Völler	Werder Bremen
1984	Harald Schumacher	1. FC Köln
1985	Hans-Peter Briegel	(Italy) Hellas Verona
1986	Harald Schumacher	1. FC Köln
1987	Uwe Rahn	Borussia Mönchengladbach
1988	Jürgen Klinsmann	VfB Stuttgart
1989	Thomas Häßler	1. FC Köln
1990	Lothar Matthäus	(Italy) Internazionale
1991	Stefan Kuntz	1. FC Kaiserslautern
1992	Thomas Häßler	(Italy) Roma
1993	Andreas Köpke	1. FC Nürnberg
1994	Jürgen Klinsmann	(France) Monaco
1995	Matthias Sammer	Borussia Dortmund
1996	Matthias Sammer	Borussia Dortmund
1997	Jürgen Kohler	Borussia Dortmund
1998	Oliver Bierhoff	(Italy) Udinese
1999	Lothar Matthäus	Bayern Munich
2000	Oliver Kahn	Bayern Munich
2001	Oliver Kahn	Bayern Munich
2002	Michael Ballack	Bayer Leverkusen
2003	Michael Ballack	Bayern Munich
2004	(Brazil) Aílton	Werder Bremen
2005	Michael Ballack	Bayern Munich
2006	Miroslav Klose	Werder Bremen
2007	Mario Gómez	VfB Stuttgart
2008	(France) Franck Ribéry	Bayern Munich
2009	(Brazil) Grafite	VfL Wolfsburg
2010	(Netherlands) Arjen Robben	Bayern Munich
2011	Manuel Neuer	Schalke 04
2012	Marco Reus	Borussia Mönchengladbach
2013	Bastian Schweinsteiger	Bayern Munich
2014	Manuel Neuer	Bayern Munich
2015	(Belgium) Kevin De Bruyne	VfL Wolfsburg
2016	Jérôme Boateng	Bayern Munich
2017	Philipp Lahm	Bayern Munich
2018	Toni Kroos	(Spain) Real Madrid
2019	Marco Reus	Borussia Dortmund
2020	(Poland) Robert Lewandowski	Bayern Munich
2021	(Poland) Robert Lewandowski	Bayern Munich
2022	(France) Christopher Nkunku	RB Leipzig
2023	İlkay Gündoğan	(England) Manchester City
2024	Toni Kroos	(Spain) Real Madrid
2025	Florian Wirtz	Bayer Leverkusen
2026	(England) Harry Kane	Bayern Munich

By club (clubs with at least 2 awards)
Club	Total
FC Bayern Munich	25
Borussia Mönchengladbach	6
Borussia Dortmund	5
1. FC Köln	5
Hamburger SV	3
VfB Stuttgart	3
SV Werder Bremen	3
1. FC Nürnberg	2
Bayer 04 Leverkusen	2
VfL Wolfsburg	2
(Spain) Real Madrid	2

By player (players with at least 2 awards)
Player	Total
Franz Beckenbauer	4
Michael Ballack	3
Sepp Maier	3
Uwe Seeler	3
Berti Vogts	2
Gerd Müller	2
Günter Netzer	2
Toni Schumacher (Harald Schumacher)	2
Jürgen Klinsmann	2
Lothar Matthäus	2
Manuel Neuer	2
Marco Reus	2
Matthias Sammer	2
Oliver Kahn	2
(Poland) Robert Lewandowski	2
Thomas Häßler	2
Toni Kroos	2

== Women's Footballer of the Year ==
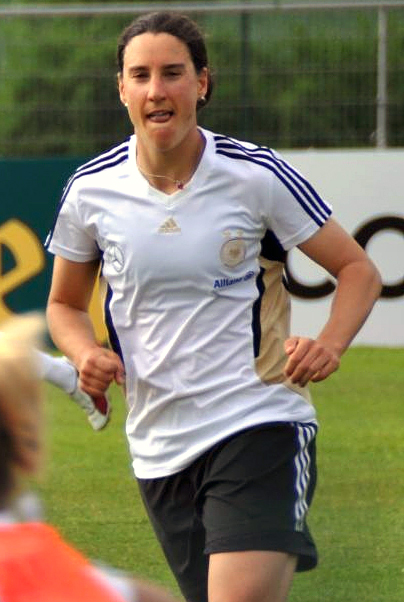
Birgit Prinz won the Footballer of the Year award eight consecutive times from 2001 to 2008.

Year	Player	Club
1996	Martina Voss	FC Rumeln-Kaldenhausen
1997	Bettina Wiegmann	Grün-Weiß Brauweiler
1998	Silke Rottenberg	SF Siegen
1999	Inka Grings	FCR Duisburg
2000	Martina Voss	FCR Duisburg
2001	Birgit Prinz	1. FFC Frankfurt
2002	Birgit Prinz	1. FFC Frankfurt
2003	Birgit Prinz	1. FFC Frankfurt
2004	Birgit Prinz	1. FFC Frankfurt
2005	Birgit Prinz	1. FFC Frankfurt
2006	Birgit Prinz	1. FFC Frankfurt
2007	Birgit Prinz	1. FFC Frankfurt
2008	Birgit Prinz	1. FFC Frankfurt
2009	Inka Grings	FCR 2001 Duisburg
2010	Inka Grings	FCR 2001 Duisburg
2011	Fatmire Bajramaj	Turbine Potsdam
2012	Célia Okoyino da Mbabi	SC 07 Bad Neuenahr
2013	Martina Müller	VfL Wolfsburg
2014	Alexandra Popp	VfL Wolfsburg
2015	Célia Šašić	1. FFC Frankfurt
2016	Alexandra Popp	VfL Wolfsburg
2017	Dzsenifer Marozsán	(France) Lyon
2018	Dzsenifer Marozsán	(France) Lyon
2019	Dzsenifer Marozsán	(France) Lyon
2020	(Denmark) Pernille Harder	VfL Wolfsburg
2021	(Austria) Nicole Billa	1899 Hoffenheim
2022	Lea Schüller	Bayern Munich
2023	Alexandra Popp	VfL Wolfsburg
2024	Ann-Katrin Berger	(United States) NJ/NY Gotham FC
2025	Ann-Katrin Berger; Giulia Gwinn	(United States) NJ/NY Gotham FC; Bayern Munich
2026	Giulia Gwinn	Bayern Munich

== Footballer of the Year for East Germany ==
From 1963 to 1991, the publication Die Neue Fußballwoche awarded the Footballer of the Year for East Germany award.

Year	Player	Club
1963	Manfred Kaiser	SC Wismut Karl-Marx-Stadt
1964	Klaus Urbanczyk	SC Chemie Halle
1965	Horst Weigang	SC Leipzig
1966	Jürgen Nöldner	FC Vorwärts Berlin
1967	Dieter Erler	FC Karl-Marx-Stadt
1968	Bernd Bransch	Hallescher FC Chemie
1969	Eberhard Vogel	FC Karl-Marx-Stadt
1970	Roland Ducke	FC Carl Zeiss Jena
1971	Peter Ducke	FC Carl Zeiss Jena
1972	Jürgen Croy	BSG Sachsenring Zwickau
1973	Hans-Jürgen Kreische	Dynamo Dresden
1974	Bernd Bransch	FC Carl Zeiss Jena
1975	Jürgen Pommerenke	1. FC Magdeburg
1976	Jürgen Croy	BSG Sachsenring Zwickau
1977	Hans-Jürgen Dörner	Dynamo Dresden
1978	Jürgen Croy	BSG Sachsenring Zwickau
1979	Joachim Streich	1. FC Magdeburg
1980	Hans-Ulrich Grapenthin	FC Carl Zeiss Jena
1981	Hans-Ulrich Grapenthin	FC Carl Zeiss Jena
1982	Rüdiger Schnuphase	FC Carl Zeiss Jena
1983	Joachim Streich	1. FC Magdeburg
1984	Hans-Jürgen Dörner	Dynamo Dresden
1985	Hans-Jürgen Dörner	Dynamo Dresden
1986	René Müller	1. FC Lokomotive Leipzig
1987	René Müller	1. FC Lokomotive Leipzig
1988	Andreas Thom	BFC Dynamo
1989	Andreas Trautmann	Dynamo Dresden
1990	Ulf Kirsten	Dynamo Dresden
1991	Torsten Gütschow	Dynamo Dresden

== East German Women's Footballer of the Year ==
Year	Player	Club
1990	Katrin Prühs	BSG Post Rostock

== See also ==
- Bundesliga Awards
- VDV Awards
- List of sports awards honoring women
- Football Manager of the Year (Germany)
- German Sportspersonality of the year
- German Volleyball Player of the Year
