= Bernd Bauchspieß =

East German footballer (1939–2024)

Personal information
- Date of birth: 10 October 1939
- Place of birth: Zeitz, Gau Halle-Merseburg, Germany
- Date of death: 22 October 2024 (aged 85)
- Position: Striker

Youth career
- 1950–1957: BSG Chemie Zeitz

Senior career*
Years	Team	Apps	(Gls)
1957–1960	BSG Chemie Zeitz	76	(61)
1961	SC Dynamo Berlin	5	(3)
1962–1963	BSG Chemie Zeitz	35	(15)
1963–1973	BSG Chemie Leipzig	228	(74)
Total		344	(153)

International career
1959	East Germany	1	(0)
Medal record
Men's football
Representing Germany
Olympic Games
Bronze medal – third place	1964 Tokyo	Team competition
- * Club domestic league appearances and goals

Bernd Bauchspieß (10 October 1939 – 22 October 2024) was an East German footballer who played as a striker.

== Career ==
Bauchspieß played 264 matches in the East German top division and scored 120 goals. Only 8 players scored more in the history of the Oberliga.

In 1959, Bauchspieß won one cap for East Germany against Finland.

He played for a United Team of Germany at the 1964 Summer Olympics in Japan, which won the bronze medal.

== Statistics ==
Season	Team	Matches/Goals
1957	BSG Chemie Zeitz	4/-
1958	BSG Chemie Zeitz	21/18
1959	BSG Chemie Zeitz	26/18
1960	BSG Chemie Zeitz	25/25
1961/62	SC Dynamo Berlin	5/3
1961/62	BSG Chemie Zeitz	14/8
1962/63	BSG Chemie Zeitz	21/7
1963/64	BSG Chemie Leipzig	21/13
1964/65	BSG Chemie Leipzig	23/14
1965/66	BSG Chemie Leipzig	23/12
1966/67	BSG Chemie Leipzig	26/14
1967/68	BSG Chemie Leipzig	25/9
1968/69	BSG Chemie Leipzig	26/7
1969/70	BSG Chemie Leipzig	13/2
1970/71	BSG Chemie Leipzig	26/3
1971/72	BSG Chemie Leipzig	20/-
1972/73	BSG Chemie Leipzig	25/-

== Death ==
Bauchspieß died on 22 October 2024, at the age of 85.
