= Horst Weigang =

German footballer (1940–2024)

- Weigang in 1967

Personal information
- Date of birth: 30 September 1940
- Place of birth: Langenbielau, Gau Silesia, Germany
- Date of death: 6 September 2024 (aged 83)
- Position: Goalkeeper

Youth career
- 1951–1959: Lokomotive Leipzig

Senior career*
Years	Team	Apps	(Gls)
1959–1961	Lokomotive Leipzig	13	(0)
1961–1962	Turbine Erfurt	25	(0)
1962–1967	Lokomotive Leipzig	92	(0)
1967–1973	Rot-Weiß Erfurt	114	(0)
Total		244	(0)

International career
1962–1968	East Germany	12	(0)
Medal record
Men's football
Representing Germany
Olympic Games
Bronze medal – third place	1964 Tokyo	Team competition
- * Club domestic league appearances and goals

Horst Weigang (30 September 1940 – 6 September 2024) was a German footballer who played as a goalkeeper.

In the DDR-Oberliga, Weigang appeared in 234 matches for SC Lokomotive Leipzig, SC Turbine/FC Rot-Weiß Erfurt, and SC Rotation/SC/1. FC Lokomotive Leipzig. He represented the East Germany national team between 1962 and 1968.

Weigang was the father of swimmer Birte Weigang, and his son Sven was also a footballer.

Weigang died on 6 September 2024, at the age of 83.
