= 1. FC Lok Stendal =

German football club

- Full name: 1. FC Lok Stendal e. V.
- Founded: 1945
- Ground: Stadion am Hölzchen
- Capacity: 6,000
- Manager: Sven Körner
- League: Oberliga NOFV-Nord (V)
- 2025–26: Oberliga NOFV-Süd, 12th
Home colours	Away colours

1. FC Lok Stendal is a German association football club that plays in Stendal, Saxony-Anhalt.

== History ==
Founded in 1909, FC Viktoria Stendal was dissolved in the aftermath of World War II and re-established in Soviet occupation zone of Germany in 1945 as SG Stendal-Nord. The club underwent a number of changes in quick succession. It was renamed Blau-Weiss Stendal in 1948 and then SG Eintracht Stendal in April 1949. By year's end Eintract was merged with two railway sides – BSG Reichsbahn Stendal and BSG RAW Stendal – to emerge briefly in December as SG Hans Wendler Stendal. The practise of honouring industry in the worker's state through the renaming of football clubs was common in East Germany. Hans Wendler was an engineer who developed a method for using dust from the country's plentiful supplies of low grade brown coal to fuel older locomotives and so was briefly honoured by having one of the railway-sponsored football sides named after him. The team was finally dubbed BSG Lokomotive Stendal in 1950.

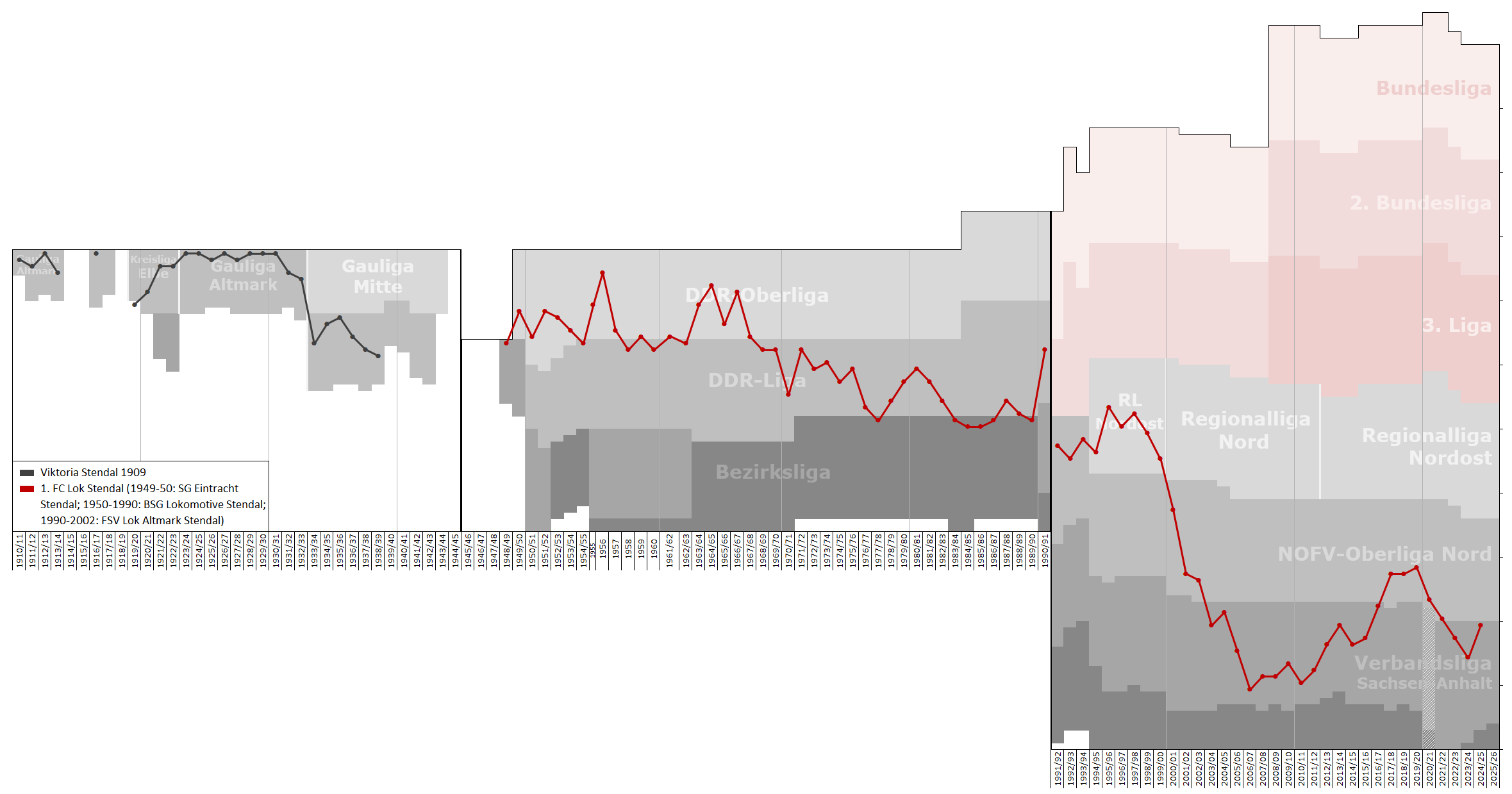
Historical chart of the club's league performance

Lok spent most of the 1950s and 1960s in the top flight DDR-Oberliga. However, they were a perennial lower-table side and their best ever result at that level was a fourth-place finish. They fell to the second-tier DDR-Liga in 1968 to play out the 1970s and early 1980s. Most of the rest of the 1980s was spent in third and fourth division level competition.

With German reunification in 1990 the club changed its name to FSV Lok Altmark Stendal and after a year in the transitional league, Lok Altmark was seeded to the third tier NOFV-Oberliga Mitte and, from 1994 to 2000, the Regionalliga Nordost. The team enjoyed a successful run in the 1995 German Cup, advancing as far as the quarter finals where there were put out on penalty kicks by Bundesliga side Bayer Leverkusen.

With the new millennium the club slipped to the NOFV-Oberliga Nord (VI) and by 2002 they were bankrupt and adrift. A union with the small local club 1. FC Stendal earned them a new start in the Verbandsliga Sachsen-Anhalt (VI since 2008, previously V) where they play today.

== Honours ==
The club's honours:

- Olympia-Pokal (de)
  - Runners-up: 1964
- Saxony-Anhalt Cup
  - Winners: 1992, 1995, 1996
  - Runners-up: 1998, 2003, 2025
