= Kurt Liebrecht =

German footballer (1936–2022)

- Liebrecht lining up for East Germany in September 1963.

Personal information
- Date of birth: 24 December 1936
- Place of birth: Stendal, East Germany
- Date of death: 21 April 2022 (aged 85)
- Position: Central midfielder

Senior career*
| Years | Team | Apps | (Gls) |
| 1955–1971 | BSG Lokomotive Stendal | 197 | (32) |
| Total | | 197 | (32) |

International career
| 1960–1965 | East Germany | 16 | (1) |
- * Club domestic league appearances and goals

Kurt Liebrecht (24 December 1936 – 21 April 2022) was a German former footballer who played as a midfielder for BSG Lokomotive Stendal and East Germany football team.

== Club career ==
Born in Saxony-Anhalt, he played for his hometown team BSG Lokomotive Stendal. He amassed 197 East German top-flight appearances.

Liebrecht earned 16 caps for East Germany. He made his debut for them on 30 October 1960 in a 5–1 friendly win at the Ostseestadion in Rostock. His only international goal came on 21 November 1962 in a 2–1 win over Czechoslovakia at the Walter Ulbricht Stadion, in the preliminary round of qualification for the 1964 European Nations' Cup.

== Career statistics ==
=== Club ===
| Club | Season | League | | | Cup (Note: Includes FDGB-Pokal) | | Total | |
| Club | Season | Division | Apps | Goals | Apps | Goals | Apps | Goals |
|---|---|---|---|---|---|---|---|---|
| BSG Lokomotive Stendal | 1956 | DDR-Oberliga | 25 | 3 | 1 | 0 | 26 | 3 |
| BSG Lokomotive Stendal | 1957 | DDR-Oberliga | 25 | 7 | 3 | 1 | 28 | 8 |
| BSG Lokomotive Stendal | 1958 | DDR-Oberliga | – | | 1 | 0 | 1 | 0 |
| BSG Lokomotive Stendal | 1959 | DDR-Oberliga | 21 | 4 | 1 | 1 | 22 | 5 |
| BSG Lokomotive Stendal | 1960 | DDR-Oberliga | – | | 4 | 1 | 4 | 1 |
| BSG Lokomotive Stendal | 1961–62 | DDR-Oberliga | 15 | 0 | – | | 15 | 0 |
| BSG Lokomotive Stendal | 1962–63 | DDR-Oberliga | – | | 3 | 0 | 3 | 0 |
| BSG Lokomotive Stendal | 1963–64 | DDR-Oberliga | 20 | 3 | 1 | 0 | 21 | 3 |
| BSG Lokomotive Stendal | 1964–65 | DDR-Oberliga | 24 | 3 | 2 | 0 | 26 | 3 |
| BSG Lokomotive Stendal | 1965–66 | DDR-Oberliga | 26 | 4 | 4 | 1 | 30 | 5 |
| BSG Lokomotive Stendal | 1966–67 | DDR-Oberliga | 24 | 3 | 1 | 0 | 25 | 3 |
| BSG Lokomotive Stendal | 1967–68 | DDR-Oberliga | 17 | 5 | 2 | 0 | 19 | 5 |
| BSG Lokomotive Stendal | 1968–69 | DDR-Oberliga | – | | – | | – | |
| BSG Lokomotive Stendal | 1969–70 | DDR-Oberliga | – | | 2 | 0 | 2 | 0 |
| Career total | | | 197 | 32 | 25 | 4 | 222 | 36 |

=== International ===
As of 4 September 1965

East Germany national team
| Year | Apps | Goals |
|---|---|---|
| 1960 | 3 | 0 |
| 1962 | 4 | 1 |
| 1963 | 7 | 0 |
| 1964 | 1 | 0 |
| 1965 | 1 | 0 |
| Total | 16 | 1 |

=== International goals ===
Scores and results list East Germany's goal tally first.

| Goal | Date | Venue | Opponent | Score | Result | Competition |
|---|---|---|---|---|---|---|
| 1. | 21 November 1962 | Walter-Ulbricht-Stadion, East Berlin, East Germany | Czechoslovakia | 2–0 | 2–1 | 1964 European Nations' Cup qualifying |
