= 1955 DDR-Oberliga =

DDR-Oberliga
- Season: 1955
- Champions: SC Wismut Karl-Marx-Stadt
- Relegated: none
- Matches played: 91
- Goals scored: 323 (3.55 per match)
- Top goalscorer: Klaus Selignow (12)
- Total attendance: 1,057,000
- Average attendance: 11,615

The 1955 DDR-Oberliga was the seventh season of the DDR-Oberliga, the first tier of league football in East Germany. After the 1954–55 season the league played a transition round in autumn 1955, followed by five seasons, until 1960, where it played in the calendar year format. From 1961–62 onwards the league returned to its traditional format.

The league was contested by fourteen teams. SC Wismut Karl-Marx-Stadt won in the unofficial championship.

Klaus Selignow of Rotation Babelsberg was the league's top scorer with 12 goals.

== Overview ==
After the conclusion of the 1954–55 season, the Oberliga was supposed to be played exclusively in the summer months, as was the standard in the Soviet Union. As it was deemed impractical to not hold a competition for almost a year (the 1954-55 season had ended in April, the 1956 season was planned to begin in March) a transition championship was played. 14 clubs competed, but neither a champion was determined, nor was any club relegated.

== Table ==
The 1955 season saw two newly promoted clubs, Fortschritt Weißenfels and BSG Lokomotive Stendal.

| Pos | Team | Pld | W | D | L | GF | GA | GD | Pts |
|---|---|---|---|---|---|---|---|---|---|
| 1 | SC Wismut Karl-Marx-Stadt (C) | 13 | 8 | 4 | 1 | 30 | 13 | +17 | 20 |
| 2 | SC Empor Rostock | 13 | 8 | 3 | 2 | 25 | 13 | +12 | 19 |
| 3 | SC Dynamo Berlin | 13 | 8 | 2 | 3 | 35 | 12 | +23 | 18 |
| 4 | BSG Motor Zwickau | 13 | 7 | 3 | 3 | 36 | 21 | +15 | 17 |
| 5 | BSG Rotation Babelsberg | 13 | 6 | 3 | 4 | 29 | 24 | +5 | 15 |
| 6 | SC Lokomotive Leipzig | 13 | 6 | 2 | 5 | 21 | 17 | +4 | 14 |
| 7 | SC Fortschritt Weißenfels | 13 | 5 | 3 | 5 | 19 | 20 | −1 | 13 |
| 8 | SC Turbine Erfurt | 13 | 5 | 3 | 5 | 16 | 18 | −2 | 13 |
| 9 | BSG Lokomotive Stendal | 13 | 5 | 1 | 7 | 16 | 31 | −15 | 11 |
| 10 | ZSK Vorwärts Berlin | 13 | 4 | 2 | 7 | 26 | 28 | −2 | 10 |
| 11 | SC Rotation Leipzig | 13 | 4 | 2 | 7 | 16 | 27 | −11 | 10 |
| 12 | SC Einheit Dresden | 13 | 3 | 2 | 8 | 21 | 24 | −3 | 8 |
| 13 | SC Aktivist Brieske-Senftenberg | 13 | 4 | 0 | 9 | 17 | 33 | −16 | 8 |
| 14 | BSG Chemie Karl-Marx-Stadt | 13 | 2 | 2 | 9 | 16 | 42 | −26 | 6 |

(C) Champions

== Results ==
| Home \ Away | ABS | DBE | EIN | ROS | WEI | LLE | LST | KMS | ZWI | BAB | ROT | ERF | VBE | WIS |
|---|---|---|---|---|---|---|---|---|---|---|---|---|---|---|
| Aktivist Brieske-Senftenberg | | 0–4 | 2–1 | | 4–1 | | | 3–0 | 0–6 | | | 2–0 | | |
| Dynamo Berlin | | | | 1–2 | 3–2 | | | 9–0 | | 4–2 | 2–1 | 3–0 | | |
| Einheit Dresden | | 0–2 | | 0–1 | | | 4–0 | | 0–1 | 3–5 | | 0–1 | | 0–2 |
| Empor Rostock | 2–1 | | | | | 1–0 | 1–3 | 6–0 | 1–1 | | 2–0 | | 4–1 | |
| Fortschritt Weißenfels | | | 1–2 | 2–0 | | | 1–0 | | 2–1 | 1–1 | | | 0–0 | |
| Lokomotive Leipzig | 4–1 | 2–1 | 3–3 | | 2–0 | | | | | 1–1 | | | 3–1 | 1–2 |
| Lokomotive Stendal | 3–2 | 2–1 | | | | 1–2 | | | | 0–6 | | 1–0 | | 1–3 |
| Chemie Karl-Marx-Stadt | | | 1–4 | | 2–5 | 2–0 | 2–3 | | | | 1–2 | | 5–1 | |
| Motor Zwickau | | 0–4 | | | | 3–2 | 1–1 | 5–1 | | | 6–1 | 4–1 | | 1–3 |
| Rotation Babelsberg | 1–0 | | | 2–3 | | | | 3–1 | 2–2 | | 3–0 | | 2–0 | |
| Rotation Leipzig | 4–2 | | 2–2 | | 0–1 | 0–1 | 1–0 | | | | | 1–1 | 2–0 | |
| Turbine Erfurt | | | | 2–2 | 3–1 | 1–0 | | 0–0 | | 4–1 | | | | 2–0 |
| Vorwärts Berlin | 5–0 | 0–0 | 3–2 | | | | 7–1 | | 3–5 | | | 3–1 | | 2–3 |
| Wismut Karl-Marx-Stadt | 2–0 | 1–1 | | 0–0 | 2–2 | | | 1–1 | | 5–0 | 6–2 | | | |

Legend: Blue = home team win; Yellow = draw; Red = away team win.
