= Willy Tröger =

German footballer

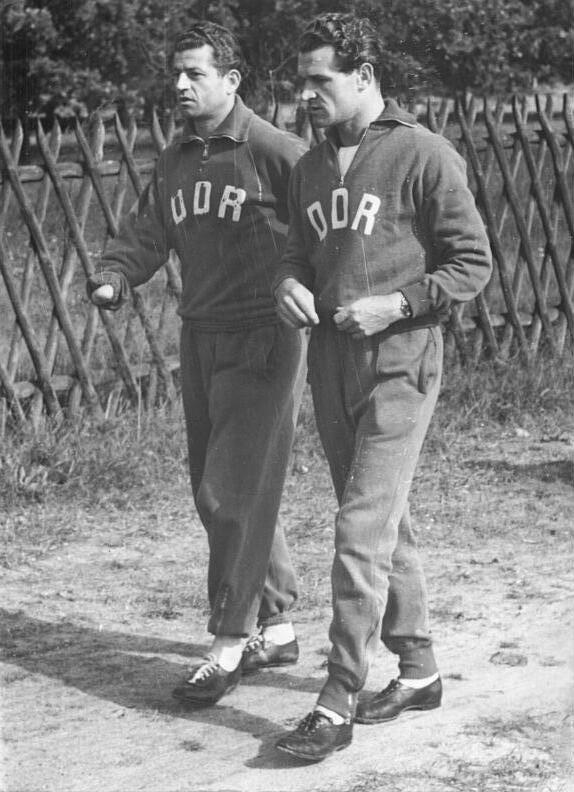
- Tröger (left) in 1957, with East Germany international team-mate Kurt Zapf

Personal information
- Date of birth: 2 October 1928
- Place of birth: Zwickau, Germany
- Date of death: 30 March 2004 (aged 75)
- Place of death: Pirna, Germany
- Position: Striker

Youth career
- 1943–1945: SG Zwickau-Oberhohndorf
- 1946–1947: Wismut Cainsdorf
- 1947–1951: BSG Mechanik Cainsdorf

Senior career*
Years	Team	Apps	(Gls)
1951–1954	Wismut Aue	79	(38)
1954–1962	Wismut Karl-Marx-Stadt	158	(76)
Total		237	(114)

International career
1954–1959	East Germany	15	(10)
- * Club domestic league appearances and goals

Willy Tröger (2 October 1928 – 30 March 2004) was a German footballer who played as a striker, spending his entire career with Wismut Aue, and making 15 appearances for the East Germany national team.

== Career ==
In his youth, Tröger played handball before converting to football, where he initially played as a goalkeeper. Both of these activities were cut short in 1945, however, when he lost his hand while fighting in World War II: having been drafted into the Wehrmacht as the war drew to a close, he was injured by a grenade in Berlin.

He continued in the game, however, and converted to the position of striker, playing for a succession of local clubs in Zwickau before joining Wismut Aue of the DDR-Oberliga in 1951, following coach Walter Fritzsch. He remained with the club, which was renamed Wismut Karl-Marx-Stadt in 1954, until 1962, scoring 114 goals in 237 games.

During this time the club won three league titles (1956, 1957 and 1959) and one cup in 1955, and Tröger was the league's top scorer in the 1954–55 season, with 22 goals. His 114 goals at the highest level of East German football are a club record.

Tröger made 15 appearances for the East Germany national team, scoring 10 goals between 1954 and 1959, including 2 goals in the national team's first victory, a 3–2 win against Romania in Bucharest in 1955.

== Death ==
Tröger died of stomach cancer on 30 March 2004 in Pirna-Copitz, having been unsuccessfully operated on twice. A song was written in tribute by local artist Stefan Gerlach, and the stadium in Pirna was renamed the Willy-Tröger-Stadion in his honour.
