= 1958 DDR-Oberliga =

DDR-Oberliga
- Season: 1958
- Champions: ASK Vorwärts Berlin
- Relegated: SC Chemie Halle; BSG Rotation Babelsberg
- European Cup: ASK Vorwärts Berlin
- Matches: 182
- Goals: 532 (2.92 per match)
- Top goalscorer: Helmut Müller (17)
- Total attendance: 1,779,800
- Average attendance: 9,779

The 1958 DDR-Oberliga was the tenth season of the DDR-Oberliga, the first tier of league football in East Germany. Rather than in the traditional autumn-spring format the Oberliga played for six seasons from 1955 to 1960 in the calendar year format, modelled on the system used in the Soviet Union. From 1961–62 onwards the league returned to its traditional format.

The league was contested by fourteen teams. National People's Army club ASK Vorwärts Berlin won the championship, the club's first of six national East German championships. On the strength of the 1958 title Vorwärts qualified for the 1959–60 European Cup where the club was knocked out by Wolverhampton Wanderers in the preliminary round.

Helmut Müller of SC Motor Jena was the league's top scorer with 17 goals.

== Table ==
The 1958 season saw two newly promoted clubs, SC Dynamo Berlin and SC Empor Rostock.

Pos	Team	Pld	W	D	L	GF	GA	GD	Pts	Qualification or relegation
1	ASK Vorwärts Berlin (C)	26	17	4	5	50	24	+26	38	Qualification to European Cup preliminary round
2	SC Motor Jena	26	15	2	9	49	36	+13	32	
3	SC Aktivist Brieske-Senftenberg	26	12	6	8	41	25	+16	30	
4	SC Wismut Karl-Marx-Stadt	26	10	8	8	43	32	+11	28	
5	SC Einheit Dresden	26	11	6	9	38	39	−1	28	FDGB-Pokal winners
6	SC Dynamo Berlin	26	10	6	10	37	34	+3	26	
7	SC Empor Rostock	26	10	6	10	33	31	+2	26	
8	BSG Motor Zwickau	26	8	10	8	38	41	−3	26	
9	SC Lokomotive Leipzig	26	8	9	9	40	28	+12	25	
10	SC Rotation Leipzig	26	10	5	11	38	41	−3	25	
11	SC Turbine Erfurt	26	8	6	12	33	44	−11	22	
12	SC Fortschritt Weißenfels	26	8	6	12	30	42	−12	22	
13	SC Chemie Halle (R)	26	7	8	11	30	50	−20	22	Relegation to DDR-Liga
14	BSG Rotation Babelsberg (R)	26	5	4	17	32	65	−33	14	Relegation to DDR-Liga

(C) Champions; (R) Relegated

== Results ==
Home \ Away	ABS	CHH	DBE	EIN	ROS	WEI	LOK	MJE	ZWI	BAB	ROT	ERF	VBE	WIS
Aktivist Brieske-Senftenberg		3–0	1–0	1–1	0–0	4–0	2–1	4–0	4–1	5–0	3–2	2–0	2–0	1–1
Chemie Halle	1–0		0–0	1–0	1–1	2–4	1–1	1–1	3–1	1–2	2–1	3–2	1–1	4–1
Dynamo Berlin	0–2	5–1		0–0	2–1	4–0	1–1	2–1	3–1	2–1	6–3	0–2	1–2	2–0
Einheit Dresden	2–0	1–2	0–0		2–1	2–0	1–0	3–2	2–1	5–1	5–0	0–2	3–1	2–2
Empor Rostock	0–0	1–1	2–0	1–3		2–0	0–0	2–1	0–2	3–0	3–1	2–1	3–1	4–1
Fortschritt Weißenfels	0–2	0–0	2–0	3–0	3–1		1–1	2–0	4–0	3–2	0–0	0–0	1–1	2–0
Lokomotive Leipzig	1–1	3–0	2–0	1–1	0–1	6–0		1–2	0–0	5–0	0–2	4–3	1–0	0–0
Motor Jena	3–0	4–0	1–2	5–2	3–2	1–0	3–1		3–0	6–1	1–0	2–0	2–0	1–0
Motor Zwickau	1–1	1–1	1–1	2–0	3–0	4–3	2–1	1–1		3–0	4–0	3–1	2–2	1–1
Rotation Babelsberg	3–2	5–0	1–1	0–1	2–1	1–1	1–4	2–4	0–0		1–2	6–1	1–2	1–1
Rotation Leipzig	1–0	1–0	4–1	1–0	0–0	2–0	2–4	1–2	1–1	4–0		1–1	1–2	3–0
Turbine Erfurt	2–1	4–2	0–2	2–2	0–1	1–0	2–2	1–0	2–1	3–1	0–3		0–0	1–3
Vorwärts Berlin	2–0	3–2	2–1	4–0	3–1	3–1	1–0	4–0	5–0	2–0	4–1	1–0		2–0
Wismut Karl-Marx-Stadt	3–0	4–0	3–1	6–0	1–0	3–0	1–0	4–0	2–2	3–0	1–1	2–2	0–2	

Legend: Blue = home team win; Yellow = draw; Red = away team win.
