= 1956 DDR-Oberliga =

DDR-Oberliga
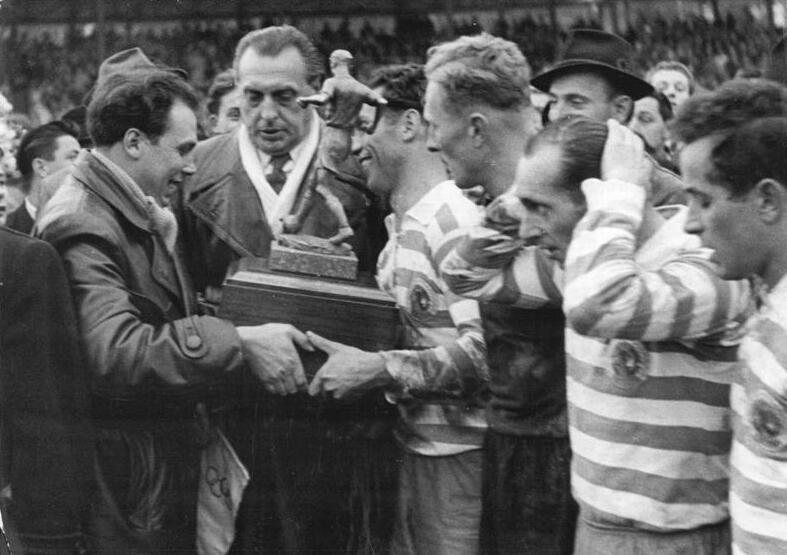
- Wismut Karl-Marx-Stadt is awarded the new East German championship trophy
- Season: 1956
- Champions: SC Wismut Karl-Marx-Stadt
- Relegated: SC Dynamo Berlin; SC Empor Rostock
- European Cup: SC Wismut Karl-Marx-Stadt
- Matches: 182
- Goals: 565 (3.1 per match)
- Top goalscorer: Ernst Lindner (18)
- Total attendance: 2,403,000
- Average attendance: 13,203

The 1956 DDR-Oberliga was the eighth season of the DDR-Oberliga, the first tier of league football in East Germany. Rather than in the traditional autumn-spring format the Oberliga played for six seasons from 1955 to 1960 in the calendar year format, modelled on the system used in the Soviet Union. From 1961–62 onwards the league returned to its traditional format.

The league was contested by fourteen teams. SC Wismut Karl-Marx-Stadt, incidentally based at Aue and not Karl-Marx-Stadt, won the championship, the club's first official one, having previously won the transition competition in 1955. On the strength of this title Wismut qualified for the 1957–58 European Cup where the club lost to Ajax Amsterdam in the first round.

Ernst Lindner of BSG Lokomotive Stendal was the league's top scorer with 18 goals.

== Table ==
The 1956 season saw two newly promoted clubs compare to the last official season, 1954–55, Fortschritt Weißenfels and BSG Lokomotive Stendal, with both already having played in the transition round in 1955. The FDGB-Pokal was won by second division DDR-Liga club Chemie Halle.

Pos	Team	Pld	W	D	L	GF	GA	GD	Pts	Qualification or relegation
1	SC Wismut Karl-Marx-Stadt (C)	26	15	8	3	53	21	+32	38	Qualification to European Cup preliminary round
2	SC Aktivist Brieske-Senftenberg	26	14	8	4	34	15	+19	36	
3	SC Lokomotive Leipzig	26	14	6	6	45	22	+23	34	
4	BSG Lokomotive Stendal	26	12	4	10	55	54	+1	28	
5	SC Einheit Dresden	26	10	6	10	50	46	+4	26	
6	ZASK Vorwärts Berlin	26	9	8	9	41	41	0	26	
7	BSG Rotation Babelsberg	26	9	8	9	41	53	−12	26	
8	SC Rotation Leipzig	26	9	6	11	35	41	−6	24	
9	SC Motor Karl-Marx-Stadt	26	8	7	11	24	48	−24	23	
10	SC Fortschritt Weißenfels	26	7	8	11	36	38	−2	22	
11	BSG Motor Zwickau	26	10	2	14	47	52	−5	22	
12	SC Turbine Erfurt	26	5	11	10	36	38	−2	21	
13	SC Dynamo Berlin (R)	26	7	6	13	37	47	−10	20	Relegation to DDR-Liga
14	SC Empor Rostock (R)	26	6	6	14	31	49	−18	18	Relegation to DDR-Liga

(C) Champions; (R) Relegated

== Results ==
Home \ Away	ABS	DBE	EIN	ROS	WEI	LLE	LST	KMS	ZWI	BAB	ROT	ERF	VBE	WIS
Aktivist Brieske-Senftenberg		3–0	1–0	1–0	1–0	1–0	2–1	3–0	2–0	5–0	3–0	1–0	0–1	0–0
Dynamo Berlin	1–2		2–2	1–1	5–1	0–1	1–4	-:+ (Note: The match between Dynamo Berlin and Wismut Karl-Marx-Stadt (originally 2–1) was scored 0-0 and a win for Wismut because Berlin used the player Dieter Legler without a permit.)	1–0	4–3	4–2	3–2	1–1	2–1
Einheit Dresden	3–1	1–1		3–1	6–0	2–5	3–0	2–4	4–2	2–2	0–3	5–3	3–0	1–1
Empor Rostock	1–1	0–3	3–2		0–1	0–2	1–5	4–0	3–6	1–2	1–0	1–1	2–1	0–1
Fortschritt Weißenfels	1–0	1–1	1–1	3–0		1–2	5–1	1–1	1–3	3–0	5–1	0–0	1–3	1–1
Lokomotive Leipzig	1–1	3–1	4–0	2–1	0–0		3–1	4–0	3–1	0–1	2–0	0–1	4–2	0–0
Lokomotive Stendal	1–1	4–1	1–0	2–1	2–1	2–2		4–1	5–2	7–2	1–0	1–1	2–3	1–1
Motor Karl-Marx-Stadt	1–1	1–0	1–1	0–0	0–6	0–0	6–3		1–0	1–0	2–0	0–0	2–2	0–2
Motor Zwickau	2–0	4–1	0–3	0–1	4–1	1–0	0–1	5–2		3–0	2–2	1–3	3–0	0–5
Rotation Babelsberg	0–0	1–0	1–0	3–1	2–2	2–2	2–0	3–0	5–4		0–2	3–2	1–1	2–2
Rotation Leipzig	0–0	3–2	1–2	2–3	1–0	1–2	5–3	1–0	2–0	5–3		1–0	0–0	1–1
Turbine Erfurt	0–0	2–0	4–0	2–2	0–0	1–3	5–0	0–1	1–1	1–1	0–0		2–3	3–3
Vorwärts Berlin	1–2	1–1	2–3	2–2	1–0	1–0	2–3	4–0	2–3	2–2	0–0	4–1		1–0
Wismut Karl-Marx-Stadt	1–2	3–1	2–1	3–1	2–0	1–0	3–0	2–0	3–0	3–0	5–2	4–1	3–1	

Legend: Blue = home team win; Yellow = draw; Red = away team win.
