= 1954–55 DDR-Oberliga =

DDR-Oberliga
- Season: 1954–55
- Champions: BSG Turbine Erfurt
- Relegated: SC Chemie Halle-Leuna Fortschritt Meerane
- Matches played: 182
- Goals scored: 614 (3.37 per match)
- Top goalscorer: Willy Tröger (22)
- Total attendance: 2,524,500
- Average attendance: 13,871

The 1954–55 DDR-Oberliga was the sixth season of the DDR-Oberliga, the first tier of league football in East Germany. After the 1954–55 season the league played a transition round in autumn 1955, followed by five seasons, until 1960, where it played in the calendar year format. From 1961–62 onwards the league returned to its traditional format.

The league was contested by fourteen teams, one less than in the previous season, a strength the DDR-Oberliga would operate at for the rest of its history. BSG Turbine Erfurt won the championship, its second consecutive one for the club, becoming the first club to win back-to-back titles.

Willy Tröger of SC Wismut Karl-Marx-Stadt was the league's top scorer with 22 goals.

Two teams were relocated during the season, in November 1954, with Dynamo Dresden relocating to East Berlin to continue as SC Dynamo Berlin and BSG Empor Lauter relocating to Rostock to continue as SC Empor Rostock. A number of enterprise sports communities (BSG) were also replaced by the new sport clubs from October 1954 onwards, indicated by the SC before the name, to concentrate the best players in centers of excellence at certain locations and to improve the level of the game in East Germany. The football department of BSG Wismut Aue was delegated to the newly founded sports club SC Wismut Karl-Marx-Stadt, but the team remained in Aue and did not move to Chemnitz, then called Karl-Marx-Stadt, despite joining SC Wismut Karl-Marx-Stadt. BSG Einheit Ost and BSG Chemie Leipzig were dissolved, and their football players were delegated to the newly founded sports clubs SC Rotation Leipzig and SC Lokomotive Leipzig respectively.

Unlike the 1954–55 champions of West Germany and the Saar Protectorate the East German champion did not take part in the first edition of the European Cup the following season. It would take until 1957–58 for the DDR-Oberliga winner to compete in Europe.

== Table ==
The 1954–55 season saw two newly promoted clubs, ASK Vorwärts Berlin and BSG Chemie Karl-Marx-Stadt.

Pos	Team	Pld	W	D	L	GF	GA	GD	Pts	Qualification or relegation
1	SC Turbine Erfurt (C)	26	13	8	5	58	25	+33	34	League champions
2	SC Wismut Karl-Marx-Stadt	26	13	7	6	62	38	+24	33	FDGB-Pokal winners
3	SC Rotation Leipzig	26	10	10	6	58	47	+11	30	
4	SC Einheit Dresden	26	13	3	10	64	55	+9	29	
5	BSG Motor Zwickau	26	13	2	11	51	49	+2	28	
6	SC Aktivist Brieske-Senftenberg	26	11	5	10	37	44	−7	27	
7	SC Dynamo Berlin	26	12	2	12	50	49	+1	26	
8	ZSK Vorwärts Berlin	26	10	6	10	43	46	−3	26	
9	SC Empor Rostock	26	12	2	12	29	33	−4	26	
10	BSG Chemie Karl-Marx-Stadt	26	8	9	9	34	43	−9	25	
11	SC Lokomotive Leipzig	26	9	6	11	32	38	−6	24	
12	BSG Rotation Babelsberg	26	10	3	13	36	36	0	23	
13	SC Chemie Halle-Leuna (R)	26	8	4	14	28	52	−24	20	Relegation to DDR-Liga
14	BSG Fortschritt Meerane (R)	26	5	3	18	31	58	−27	13	Relegation to DDR-Liga

(C) Champions; (R) Relegated

== Results ==
Home \ Away	ABS	CHH	KMS	DBE	EIN	ROS	MEE	LOK	ZWI	BAB	ROT	ERF	VBE	WIS
Aktivist Brieske-Senftenberg		4–2	0–0	2–6	4–1	1–0	3–1	1–2	3–0	1–0	0–4	0–0	2–0	1–1
Chemie Halle-Leuna	0–1		1–1	2–1	2–2	0–1	0–1	1–0	0–5	1–1	2–0	2–1	2–1	2–1
Chemie Karl-Marx-Stadt	1–1	0–1		1–3	4–3	2–0	2–1	2–1	2–4	3–2	1–1	0–2	0–0	1–1
Dynamo Berlin	4–0	3–2	0–3		2–4	2–0	2–1	6–3	1–5	0–3	1–1	2–0	4–0	0–0
Einheit Dresden	2–0	3–2	1–0	1–2		2–1	2–1	4–2	7–2	1–0	8–1	4–4	3–2	3–1
Empor Rostock	2–0	3–0	0–0	1–0	1–0		3–0	2–1	3–0	1–0	2–0	2–1	1–1	1–0
Fortschritt Meerane	1–2	1–2	2–2	1–0	4–3	1–0		0–2	4–1	1–2	1–1	0–6	1–2	1–2
Lokomotive Leipzig	4–1	0–0	0–2	3–2	0–1	1–0	2–0		1–0	0–1	1–1	1–1	0–2	3–3
Motor Zwickau	3–0	3–1	3–1	0–2	4–1	2–1	1–1	0–0		1–0	5–3	0–2	1–5	5–3
Rotation Babelsberg	1–2	6–1	1–2	4–1	4–2	2–1	2–1	0–2	0–2		1–1	0–0	1–0	3–1
Rotation Leipzig	4–3	4–1	6–2	5–1	2–2	6–2	3–2	0–2	1–0	4–2		1–1	1–1	2–2
Turbine Erfurt	0–2	3–0	5–0	5–2	1–0	4–0	5–0	2–0	1–2	3–0	0–0		3–2	1–1
Vorwärts Berlin	2–2	3–1	2–2	1–3	3–1	2–1	6–3	1–1	1–0	1–0	0–3	2–5		3–2
Wismut Karl-Marx-Stadt	3–1	3–0	2–0	1–0	6–3	5–0	2–1	5–0	5–2	3–0	4–3	2–2	3–0	

Legend: Blue = home team win; Yellow = draw; Red = away team win.
