= 1960 DDR-Oberliga =

DDR-Oberliga
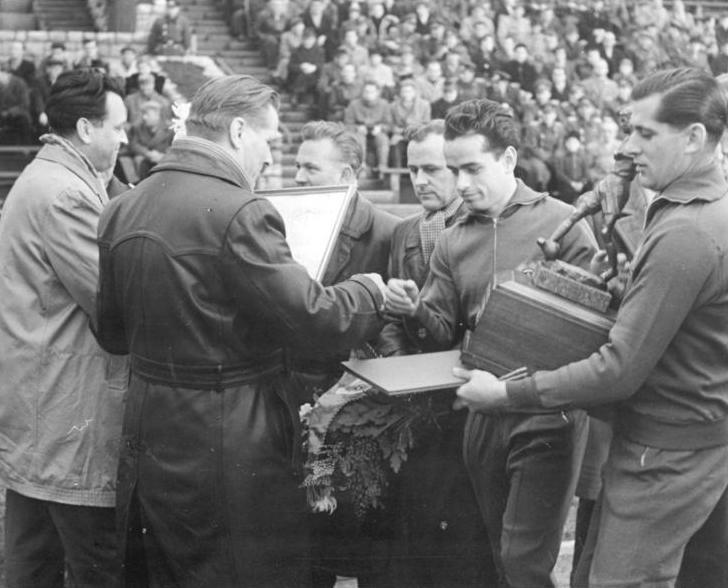
- Players of Vorwärts Berlin receive the championship trophy before the final game of the season
- Season: 1960
- Champions: ASK Vorwärts Berlin
- Relegated: Chemie Zeitz; Fortschritt Weißenfels
- European Cup: ASK Vorwärts Berlin
- European Cup Winners' Cup: SC Motor Jena
- Matches: 182
- Goals: 590 (3.24 per match)
- Top goalscorer: Bernd Bauchspieß (25)
- Total attendance: 1,692,500
- Average attendance: 9,299

The 1960 DDR-Oberliga was the twelfth season of the DDR-Oberliga, the first tier of league football in East Germany. It was the last season not to be played in the traditional autumn-spring format, with the Oberliga having played for six seasons from 1955 to 1960 in the calendar year format instead, modelled on the system used in the Soviet Union. From 1961–62 onwards the league returned to its traditional format.

The league was contested by fourteen teams. National People's Army club ASK Vorwärts Berlin won the championship, the club's second of six national East German championships. On the strength of the 1960 title Vorwärts qualified for the 1961–62 European Cup where the club was knocked out by Rangers F.C. in the first round. Eighth-placed club SC Motor Jena qualified for the 1961–62 European Cup Winners' Cup as the 1960 FDGB-Pokal winner and advanced to the semi-finals before being knocked out by eventual winners Atlético Madrid.

Bernd Bauchspieß of Chemie Zeitz was the league's top scorer with 25 goals.

== Table ==
The 1960 season saw two newly promoted clubs, SC Aufbau Magdeburg and SC Chemie Halle.

Pos	Team	Pld	W	D	L	GF	GA	GD	Pts	Qualification or relegation
1	ASK Vorwärts Berlin (C)	26	19	3	4	73	28	+45	41	Qualification to European Cup preliminary round
2	SC Dynamo Berlin	26	12	8	6	44	27	+17	32	
3	SC Lokomotive Leipzig	26	12	8	6	37	31	+6	32	
4	BSG Motor Zwickau	26	13	5	8	37	33	+4	31	
5	SC Wismut Karl-Marx-Stadt	26	14	2	10	40	32	+8	30	
6	SC Empor Rostock	26	11	7	8	46	36	+10	29	
7	SC Aufbau Magdeburg	26	12	3	11	47	59	−12	27	
8	SC Motor Jena	26	9	6	11	55	43	+12	24	Qualification to Cup Winners' Cup preliminary round
9	SC Aktivist Brieske-Senftenberg	26	8	8	10	35	39	−4	24	
10	SC Rotation Leipzig	26	9	5	12	39	39	0	23	
11	SC Chemie Halle	26	8	6	12	37	42	−5	22	
12	SC Einheit Dresden	26	7	7	12	30	51	−21	21	
13	BSG Chemie Zeitz (R)	26	7	6	13	43	61	−18	20	Relegation to DDR-Liga
14	SC Fortschritt Weißenfels (R)	26	0	8	18	27	69	−42	8	Relegation to DDR-Liga

(C) Champions; (R) Relegated

== Results ==
Home \ Away	ABS	MAG	CHH	CHZ	DBE	EIN	ROS	WEI	LOK	MJE	ZWI	ROT	VBE	WIS
Aktivist Brieske-Senftenberg		2–0	1–0	6–3	0–1	4–1	2–3	3–2	1–1	1–0	0–2	0–0	2–1	3–0
Aufbau Magdeburg	3–1		2–1	0–0	0–0	0–1	2–0	3–3	3–0	1–7	2–1	3–2	2–5	0–1
Chemie Halle	2–2	2–1		2–2	0–0	1–2	1–2	2–1	2–3	2–1	4–0	1–2	2–3	1–0
Chemie Zeitz	1–1	5–1	1–1		0–0	3–1	0–2	2–0	0–1	2–5	3–2	5–3	2–3	4–2
Dynamo Berlin	0–0	2–4	3–1	3–0		1–2	2–0	7–1	4–0	1–1	3–1	3–2	1–3	2–1
Einheit Dresden	3–1	0–1	2–2	2–1	0–5		1–1	3–2	1–1	3–2	1–1	0–2	1–3	0–3
Empor Rostock	1–1	5–2	0–0	7–2	2–0	0–0		2–1	2–2	2–2	1–3	3–0	0–4	1–0
Fortschritt Weißenfels	2–2	0–2	1–3	0–3	1–1	2–2	0–7		2–2	1–1	0–0	0–1	2–2	0–2
Lokomotive Leipzig	1–0	1–2	4–1	1–0	3–0	1–0	3–0	3–1		3–0	2–3	2–1	0–0	1–0
Motor Jena	2–0	3–5	5–2	6–0	1–2	2–0	2–1	5–2	1–1		0–1	3–3	1–2	0–1
Motor Zwickau	2–1	6–1	1–0	2–1	0–0	3–1	0–1	2–1	1–1	1–1		1–0	1–0	1–0
Rotation Leipzig	4–0	2–4	0–1	3–0	0–0	1–1	1–1	4–2	2–0	3–1	2–0		0–2	1–2
Vorwärts Berlin	4–1	6–2	3–1	6–2	0–2	6–1	3–1	2–0	0–0	0–3	3–0	3–0		4–1
Wismut Karl-Marx-Stadt	0–0	3–1	0–2	1–1	4–1	2–1	2–1	3–0	4–0	3–0	4–2	1–0	0–5	

Legend: Blue = home team win; Yellow = draw; Red = away team win.
