= 1982–83 DDR-Oberliga =

DDR-Oberliga
- Season: 1982–83
- Champions: BFC Dynamo
- Relegated: BSG Chemie Böhlen; BSG Sachsenring Zwickau
- European Cup: BFC Dynamo
- European Cup Winners' Cup: 1. FC Magdeburg
- UEFA Cup: FC Vorwärts Frankfurt; FC Carl Zeiss Jena; 1. FC Lokomotive Leipzig
- Matches: 182
- Goals: 592 (3.25 per match)
- Top goalscorer: Joachim Streich (19)
- Total attendance: 2,151,300
- Average attendance: 11,271

The 1982–83 DDR-Oberliga was the 34th season of the DDR-Oberliga, the first tier of league football in East Germany.

The league was contested by fourteen teams. BFC Dynamo won the championship, the club's fifth of ten consecutive East German championships from 1978 to 1988.

Joachim Streich of 1. FC Magdeburg was the league's top scorer with 19 goals, with Streich also taking out the seasons East German Footballer of the year award.

On the strength of the 1982–83 title BFC Dynamo qualified for the 1983–84 European Cup where the club was knocked out by A.S. Roma in the quarter-finals. Sixth-placed club 1. FC Magdeburg qualified for the 1983–84 European Cup Winners' Cup as the seasons FDGB-Pokal winners and lost to FC Barcelona in the first round. Second-placed FC Vorwärts Frankfurt qualified for the 1983–84 UEFA Cup where it was knocked out by Nottingham Forest in the first round while third-placed FC Carl Zeiss Jena lost to Sparta Rotterdam in the second round and fourth-placed 1. FC Lokomotive Leipzig was eliminated by Sturm Graz in the third round.

== Table ==
The 1982–83 season saw two newly promoted clubs, 1. FC Union Berlin and BSG Chemie Böhlen.

Pos	Team	Pld	W	D	L	GF	GA	GD	Pts	Qualification or relegation
1	Berliner FC Dynamo (C)	26	20	6	0	72	22	+50	46	Qualification to European Cup first round
2	FC Vorwärts Frankfurt	26	13	8	5	56	29	+27	34	Qualification to UEFA Cup first round
3	FC Carl Zeiss Jena	26	15	4	7	46	29	+17	34	Qualification to UEFA Cup first round
4	1. FC Lokomotive Leipzig	26	12	7	7	45	27	+18	31	Qualification to UEFA Cup first round
5	FC Rot-Weiss Erfurt	26	11	9	6	45	37	+8	31	
6	1. FC Magdeburg	26	10	9	7	52	32	+20	29	Qualification to Cup Winners' Cup first round
7	SG Dynamo Dresden	26	12	5	9	51	43	+8	29	
8	F.C. Hansa Rostock	26	11	6	9	38	40	−2	28	
9	FC Karl-Marx-Stadt	26	10	6	10	41	41	0	26	
10	BSG Wismut Aue	26	6	8	12	30	45	−15	20	
11	Hallescher FC Chemie	26	5	7	14	41	53	−12	17	
12	1. FC Union Berlin	26	5	7	14	23	50	−27	17	
13	BSG Chemie Böhlen (R)	26	4	5	17	31	80	−49	13	Relegation to DDR-Liga
14	BSG Sachsenring Zwickau (R)	26	2	5	19	21	64	−43	9	Relegation to DDR-Liga

(C) Champions; (R) Relegated

== Results ==
Home \ Away	BFC	CZJ	CHB	DRE	HFC	HRO	KMS	LOK	MAG	RWE	SZW	UNI	VFO	AUE
BFC Dynamo		2–0	4–0	3–3	4–0	1–0	5–1	2–1	3–2	1–0	3–0	4–0	1–1	3–0
Carl Zeiss Jena	1–1		3–1	2–1	1–0	4–1	2–1	2–1	2–1	6–0	2–0	2–0	1–1	3–0
Chemie Böhlen	2–9	0–2		2–2	2–2	1–1	2–1	0–4	1–1	0–3	2–1	3–2	1–8	4–0
Dynamo Dresden	1–2	3–2	6–1		3–1	1–4	3–1	3–1	1–1	2–1	2–0	1–0	1–3	2–0
Hallescher FC Chemie	1–3	2–1	6–0	1–3		1–2	2–2	1–2	2–2	5–1	2–1	5–2	1–1	0–1
Hansa Rostock	0–4	1–2	4–2	1–3	4–4		4–2	2–0	3–2	2–1	1–0	1–0	1–2	0–0
Karl-Marx-Stadt	1–2	1–1	3–2	3–2	0–0	4–1		1–1	0–1	2–1	1–0	5–0	4–3	2–0
Lokomotive Leipzig	2–2	1–0	2–1	2–1	2–0	4–0	1–1		0–0	1–1	5–2	4–0	1–0	1–1
1. FC Magdeburg	1–2	0–0	6–1	3–2	2–0	0–0	2–0	2–1		2–2	9–0	2–0	2–0	3–1
Rot-Weiß Erfurt	1–1	3–1	1–0	1–1	3–0	1–0	2–0	1–0	4–3		4–1	4–0	3–2	2–2
Sachsenring Zwickau	0–1	1–2	1–1	1–3	3–3	0–3	0–3	0–2	2–2	0–0		3–1	1–2	3–1
Union Berlin	1–4	1–0	4–1	2–0	2–0	0–0	0–0	3–2	1–1	1–1	1–1		1–1	0–0
Vorwärts Frankfurt (Oder)	2–2	4–1	1–0	5–1	3–0	1–2	3–0	1–1	2–1	2–2	2–0	2–0		4–1
Wismut Aue	1–3	2–3	3–1	0–0	3–2	0–0	1–2	0–3	2–1	2–2	6–0	3–1	0–0	

Legend: Blue = home team win; Yellow = draw; Red = away team win.
