= Ernst Lindner =

German footballer (1935–2012)

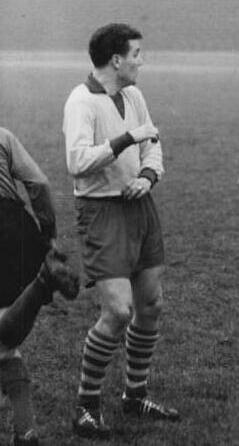
- Lindner in 1956

Personal information
- Date of birth: 11 March 1935
- Date of death: 11 October 2012 (aged 77)
- Position: Striker

Senior career*
Years	Team	Apps	(Gls)
1952–1954	BSG Lokomotive Stendal	46	(6)
1954–1955	SC DHfK Leipzig II	0	(0)
1955	SC Lokomotive Leipzig	2	(0)
1956–1957	BSG Lokomotive Stendal	36	(22)
1957–1958	Stuttgarter Kickers	0	(0)
1958–1971	BSG Lokomotive Stendal	313	(46)

International career
1959–1962	East Germany	6	(0)

Managerial career
- 1978–1980: BSG Lokomotive Stendal
- * Club domestic league appearances and goals

Ernst Lindner (11 March 1935 – 11 October 2012) was a German international footballer.

== Club career ==
In the 1956 season of the Oberliga he was the topscorer with 18 goals. Overall Ernst Lindner scored 41 goals in the East German top-flight.

== International career ==
He played six matches for the East Germany.
