= Jessy Kramer =

Dutch handball player (born 1990)

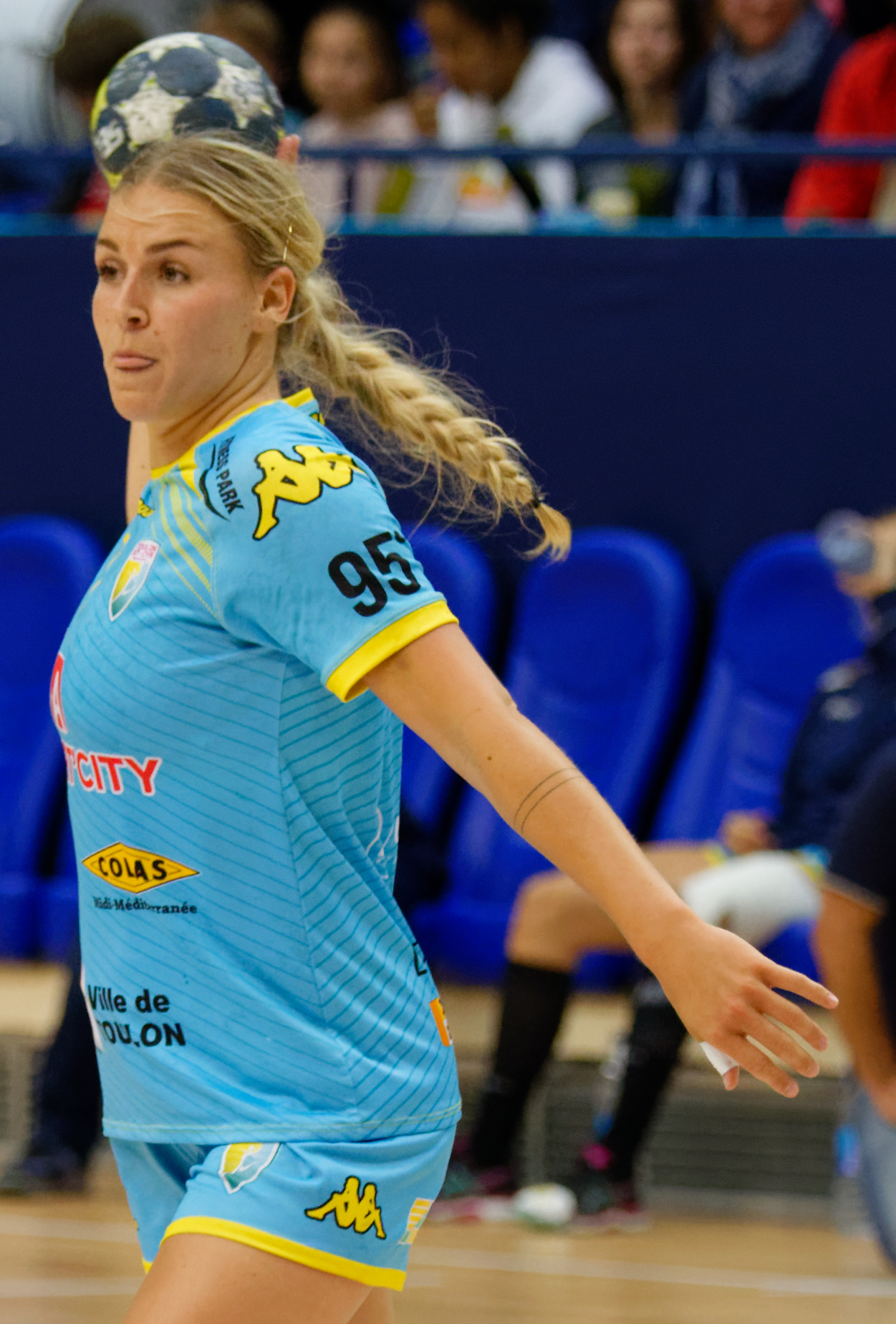

Personal information
- Full name: Jessy Anna Kramer
- Nationality: Dutch
- Born: 16 February 1990 (age 36) Zijdewind, Netherlands
- Height: 1.78 m (5 ft 10 in)

Sport
- Sport: Handball
- Position: Left back
- Current club: Toulon Handball
- Number: 7

Senior clubs
- Years: Team
- 2007-2010: Zeeman Vastgoed SEW
- 2010–2012: Frankfurter HC
- 2012–2013: HC Leipzig
- 2013–2016: Vipers Kristiansand
- 2016–2021: Toulon Handball
National team
Years	Team	Apps	(Gls)
2007-2021	Netherlands	151	(110)
Medal record
World Championship
Gold medal – first place	2019 Japan
Silver medal – second place	2015 Denmark
Bronze medal – third place	2017 Germany
European Championship
Silver medal – second place	2016 Sweden
Bronze medal – third place	2018 France

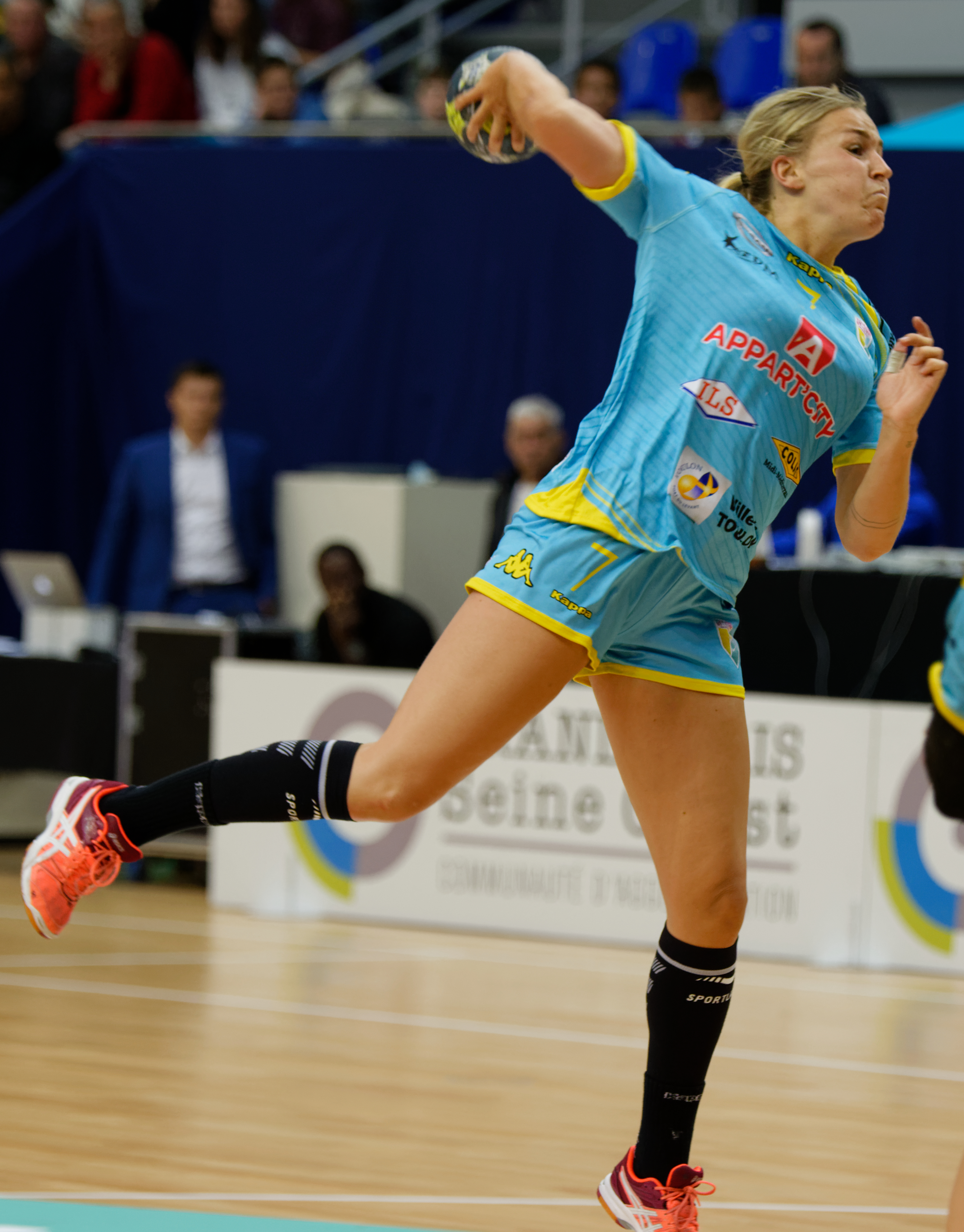
Kramer in 2017

Jessy Anna Kramer (born 16 February 1990) is a Dutch former handball player who featured in the Dutch national team. She retired in 2021 while playing for French team Toulon Handball.

She participated at the 2011 World Women's Handball Championship in Brazil and was a part of the Dutch squad that won silver at the 2015 World Women's Handball Championship in Denmark, bronze at the 2017 World Women's Handball Championship in Germany and gold at the 2019 World Women's Handball Championship in Japan; the first gold medal in the country's history.

== Career ==
Kramer started at Zeeman Vastgoed SEW, and in 2010 she joined German club Frankfurter HC. Two years later she joined league rivals HC Leipzig. In July 2013 she was released of her contract. Afterwards she joined Norwegian top club Vipers Kristiansand. In 2016 she joined French Toulon Saint-Cyr Var Handball. She retired in 2021.

Kramer has agreed to be the assistant coach at Toulon Métropole Var Handball, beginning from the 2025–26 season.
