= 1957 DDR-Oberliga =

DDR-Oberliga
- Season: 1956
- Champions: SC Wismut Karl-Marx-Stadt
- Relegated: BSG Lokomotive Stendal; SC Motor Karl-Marx-Stadt
- European Cup: SC Wismut Karl-Marx-Stadt
- Matches: 182
- Goals: 524 (2.88 per match)
- Top goalscorer: Heinz Kaulmann (15)
- Total attendance: 2,065,000
- Average attendance: 11,350

The 1957 DDR-Oberliga was the ninth season of the DDR-Oberliga, the first tier of league football in East Germany. Rather than in the traditional autumn-spring format the Oberliga played for six seasons from 1955 to 1960 in the calendar year format, modelled on the system used in the Soviet Union. From 1961–62 onwards the league returned to its traditional format.

The league was contested by fourteen teams. SC Wismut Karl-Marx-Stadt, incidentally based at Aue and not Karl-Marx-Stadt, won the championship, the club's second consecutive one, having won the 1956 championship as well. On the strength of the 1957 title Wismut qualified for the 1958–59 European Cup where the club was knocked out by Young Boys Bern in the quarter-finals.

Heinz Kaulmann of ASK Vorwärts Berlin was the league's top scorer with 15 goals.

== Table ==
The 1957 season saw two newly promoted clubs, SC Motor Jena and SC Chemie Halle-Leuna.

| Pos | Team | Pld | W | D | L | GF | GA | GD | Pts | Qualification or relegation |
|---|---|---|---|---|---|---|---|---|---|---|
| 1 | SC Wismut Karl-Marx-Stadt (C) | 26 | 16 | 4 | 6 | 49 | 28 | +21 | 36 | Qualification to European Cup preliminary round |
| 2 | ASK Vorwärts Berlin | 26 | 13 | 7 | 6 | 45 | 22 | +23 | 33 | |
| 3 | SC Rotation Leipzig | 26 | 12 | 8 | 6 | 40 | 29 | +11 | 32 | |
| 4 | SC Motor Jena | 26 | 11 | 6 | 9 | 41 | 29 | +12 | 28 | |
| 5 | SC Aktivist Brieske-Senftenberg | 26 | 11 | 6 | 9 | 33 | 26 | +7 | 28 | |
| 6 | SC Turbine Erfurt | 26 | 10 | 7 | 9 | 37 | 33 | +4 | 27 | |
| 7 | SC Lokomotive Leipzig | 26 | 9 | 8 | 9 | 36 | 32 | +4 | 26 | FDGB-Pokal winners |
| 8 | SC Einheit Dresden | 26 | 8 | 9 | 9 | 40 | 44 | −4 | 25 | |
| 9 | SC Fortschritt Weißenfels | 26 | 8 | 7 | 11 | 38 | 38 | 0 | 23 | |
| 10 | BSG Motor Zwickau | 26 | 9 | 5 | 12 | 35 | 43 | −8 | 23 | |
| 11 | BSG Rotation Babelsberg | 26 | 8 | 7 | 11 | 29 | 44 | −15 | 23 | |
| 12 | SC Chemie Halle-Leuna | 26 | 9 | 4 | 13 | 42 | 51 | −9 | 22 | |
| 13 | BSG Lokomotive Stendal (R) | 26 | 9 | 4 | 13 | 28 | 43 | −15 | 22 | Relegation to DDR-Liga |
| 14 | SC Motor Karl-Marx-Stadt (R) | 26 | 3 | 10 | 13 | 31 | 62 | −31 | 16 | Relegation to DDR-Liga |

(C) Champions; (R) Relegated

== Results ==
| Home \ Away | ABS | CHH | EIN | WEI | LLE | LST | MJE | KMS | ZWI | BAB | ROT | ERF | VBE | WIS |
|---|---|---|---|---|---|---|---|---|---|---|---|---|---|---|
| Aktivist Brieske-Senftenberg | | 3–0 | 0–2 | 1–2 | 1–1 | 3–1 | 2–1 | 4–2 | 0–0 | 3–0 | 2–0 | 1–0 | 0–1 | 1–0 |
| Chemie Halle-Leuna | 0–2 | | 3–1 | 1–1 | 1–3 | 3–0 | 0–2 | 8–1 | 2–1 | 4–1 | 1–3 | 3–4 | 0–4 | 2–3 |
| Einheit Dresden | 2–1 | 5–2 | | 1–4 | 4–2 | 4–2 | 0–0 | 4–3 | 3–0 | 2–2 | 0–1 | 1–3 | 1–1 | 1–2 |
| Fortschritt Weißenfels | 1–3 | 1–2 | 0–0 | | 0–2 | 3–1 | 4–1 | 4–0 | 2–1 | 1–1 | 1–1 | 2–0 | 3–4 | 1–1 |
| Lokomotive Leipzig | 2–0 | 2–3 | 1–1 | 2–1 | | 3–0 | 1–0 | 1–1 | 3–1 | 1–1 | 0–0 | 1–0 | 0–1 | 4–0 |
| Lokomotive Stendal | 1–2 | 1–1 | 0–1 | 1–1 | 1–0 | | 0–2 | 2–0 | 3–1 | 0–0 | 3–1 | 2–0 | 2–0 | 2–1 |
| Motor Jena | 1–1 | 3–0 | 6–1 | 1–0 | 1–1 | 3–0 | | 1–1 | 4–0 | 3–0 | 0–2 | 1–1 | 0–2 | 1–2 |
| Motor Karl-Marx-Stadt | 1–0 | 0–0 | 2–2 | 1–3 | 3–1 | 0–4 | 1–3 | | 2–2 | 3–0 | 2–2 | 3–3 | 2–2 | 0–3 |
| Motor Zwickau | 1–0 | 0–1 | 1–1 | 1–0 | 5–1 | 0–1 | 3–0 | 4–1 | | 3–1 | 1–2 | 2–1 | 1–1 | 0–1 |
| Rotation Babelsberg | 2–1 | 2–0 | 2–0 | 3–1 | 2–1 | 3–0 | 0–3 | 1–1 | 0–0 | | 2–0 | 4–2 | 0–3 | 1–1 |
| Rotation Leipzig | 1–1 | 1–1 | 2–0 | 3–0 | 3–2 | 5–0 | 0–1 | 1–1 | 2–5 | 2–0 | | 2–1 | 2–1 | 0–0 |
| Turbine Erfurt | 1–1 | 1–0 | 3–3 | 2–2 | 1–0 | 0–0 | 1–1 | 3–0 | 0–1 | 2–0 | 2–0 | | 1–0 | 1–3 |
| Vorwärts Berlin | 0–0 | 3–0 | 0–0 | 1–0 | 1–1 | 3–0 | 3–1 | 1–0 | 9–0 | 2–0 | 1–1 | 0–2 | | 0–1 |
| Wismut Karl-Marx-Stadt | 3–0 | 3–4 | 1–0 | 3–0 | 0–0 | 3–1 | 3–1 | 3–0 | 2–1 | 5–1 | 1–3 | 0–2 | 4–1 | |

Legend: Blue = home team win; Yellow = draw; Red = away team win.
