= 1952–53 DDR-Oberliga =

DDR-Oberliga
- Season: 1952–53
- Champions: SG Dynamo Dresden
- Relegated: SV Vorwärts der KVP Berlin; BSG Motor Oberschöneweide; BSG Motor Jena; BSG Wismut Gera
- Matches played: 272
- Goals scored: 885 (3.25 per match)
- Top goalscorer: Harry Arlt (26)
- Total attendance: 3,499,000
- Average attendance: 12,864

The 1952–53 DDR-Oberliga was the fourth season of the DDR-Oberliga, the first tier of league football in East Germany.

The league was contested by seventeen teams, two less than in the previous season, and Dynamo Dresden won the championship after winning a necessary decider against BSG Wismut Aue 3–2 after extra time. It was the first of eight national championships for Dynamo but it would have to wait until 1970–71 to win its second one.

Harry Arlt of BSG Rotation Dresden was the league's top scorer with 26 goals.

Two clubs were renamed during the season, both in April 1953. SG Volkspolizei Dresden became SG Dynamo Dresden and SG Motor Gera was renamed to BSG Wismut Gera. SV Vorwärts der HVA Leipzig was first renamed SV Vorwärts der KVP Leipzig. The football team was then relocated to the East Berlin on 12 April 1953, where it continued as SV Vorwärts der KVP Berlin. Before the season SG Union Oberschöneweide had been renamed to BSG Motor Oberschöneweide, with both clubs relegated at the end of season, leaving East German capital without an Oberliga club for the following season.

The 1952–53 season saw two of the most successful clubs in the East German championship adopt the name and location they would later be most successful under, police club SG Dynamo Dresden with eight and army club Vorwärts Berlin with six titles, second and third only to BFC Dynamo.

== Table ==
The 1952–53 season saw two newly promoted clubs, BSG Empor Lauter and BSG Motor Jena. SV Vorwärts der KVP Leipzig was relocated to East Berlin during the season and continued as SV Vorwärts der KVP Berlin.

Pos	Team	Pld	W	D	L	GF	GA	GD	Pts	Qualification or relegation
1	SG Dynamo Dresden (C)	32	15	8	9	51	33	+18	38	League champions
2	BSG Wismut Aue	32	16	6	10	57	48	+9	38	
3	BSG Motor Zwickau	32	16	5	11	54	43	+11	37	
4	BSG Rotation Dresden	32	15	6	11	65	55	+10	36	
5	BSG Stahl Thale	32	14	8	10	45	47	−2	36	
6	Motor Dessau	32	15	5	12	66	55	+11	35	
7	BSG Turbine Erfurt	32	14	6	12	51	44	+7	34	
8	BSG Chemie Leipzig	32	14	6	12	55	51	+4	34	
9	BSG Aktivist Brieske-Ost	32	13	8	11	55	52	+3	34	
10	BSG Empor Lauter	32	13	7	12	58	61	−3	33	
11	BSG Lokomotive Stendal	32	13	6	13	56	54	+2	32	
12	BSG Rotation Babelsberg	32	13	6	13	58	59	−1	32	
13	BSG Turbine Halle	32	12	7	13	51	44	+7	31	
14	SV Vorwärts der KVP Berlin (R)	32	12	6	14	49	56	−7	30	Relegation to DDR-Liga
15	BSG Motor Oberschöneweide (R)	32	12	3	17	47	50	−3	27	Relegation to DDR-Liga
16	BSG Motor Jena (R)	32	9	4	19	35	62	−27	22	Relegation to DDR-Liga
17	BSG Wismut Gera (R)	32	5	5	22	32	71	−39	15	Relegation to DDR-Liga

(C) Champions; (R) Relegated
- Championship decider: Dynamo Dresden – BSG Wismut Aue 3–2 aet

== Results ==
Home \ Away	ABO	CHM	DRE	EMP	LST	DES	MJE	OBE	ZWI	BAB	RDD	THA	ERF	HAL	VBE	AUE	WGE
Aktivist Brieske-Ost		1–2	0–1	4–1	1–1	5–1	3–1	0–4	0–1	6–1	1–2	0–0	2–1	2–1	2–1	1–2	3–0
Chemie Leipzig	1–2		2–0	5–5	3–1	0–0	6–0	4–1	3–2	0–1	0–2	1–1	3–2	3–1	2–1	1–3	3–0
Dynamo Dresden	0–0	0–1		2–3	5–2	2–0	0–0	4–1	2–1	1–0	1–1	1–2	1–0	1–0	2–1	4–0	6–2
Empor Lauter	1–0	2–2	1–1		2–0	1–1	3–1	0–1	0–1	3–0	2–2	2–1	3–2	2–0	2–1	1–2	1–1
Lokomotive Stendal	3–3	2–0	1–0	5–1		1–0	3–3	3–0	2–0	0–1	2–3	0–1	1–1	3–2	1–1	2–0	3–1
Motor Dessau	6–2	2–1	1–3	4–1	4–0		2–0	2–1	3–1	8–1	6–3	7–2	1–1	0–1	1–2	1–1	3–2
Motor Jena	0–2	0–1	0–3	4–1	0–2	4–0		2–1	3–2	3–0	0–1	0–3	1–0	0–0	4–0	1–2	1–0
Motor Oberschöneweide	2–0	2–3	0–1	5–3	1–0	0–3	1–2		3–0	1–1	3–0	2–0	2–2	0–1	1–3	3–4	3–0
Motor Zwickau	4–2	1–0	1–0	2–2	5–3	3–0	6–0	1–0		1–1	5–0	1–1	0–1	3–0	2–0	2–1	1–0
Rotation Babelsberg	7–1	3–1	2–2	3–0	3–2	5–0	4–0	3–2	5–0		1–2	2–4	2–4	2–2	2–4	1–1	2–0
Rotation Dresden	1–3	4–1	0–2	2–0	1–0	2–3	6–1	0–1	2–0	0–2		1–1	3–2	3–2	2–3	2–0	9–2
Stahl Thale	1–1	4–2	0–0	0–4	2–1	3–0	2–1	1–0	1–2	1–0	1–4		3–1	3–2	0–0	0–1	3–1
Turbine Erfurt	1–2	0–0	3–2	1–0	1–1	2–2	2–1	1–0	1–2	3–0	2–1	3–1		3–2	1–0	0–1	3–0
Turbine Halle	2–3	2–2	4–1	4–1	6–1	1–2	1–0	0–0	1–1	0–0	2–2	3–0	1–0		5–1	1–0	1–0
Vorwärts KVP Berlin	2–2	0–1	1–1	1–4	2–5	1–0	1–1	0–1	2–1	4–1	3–1	1–2	2–3	2–1		4–2	1–0
Wismut Aue	0–0	4–0	1–1	3–5	1–2	0–1	2–0	3–4	3–1	2–0	3–3	2–0	3–1	2–0	2–2		4–3
Wismut Gera	1–1	2–1	2–1	0–1	0–3	3–2	2–1	3–1	1–1	1–2	0–0	1–1	1–3	1–2	1–2	1–2	

Legend: Blue = home team win; Yellow = draw; Red = away team win.
