= 1959 DDR-Oberliga =

DDR-Oberliga
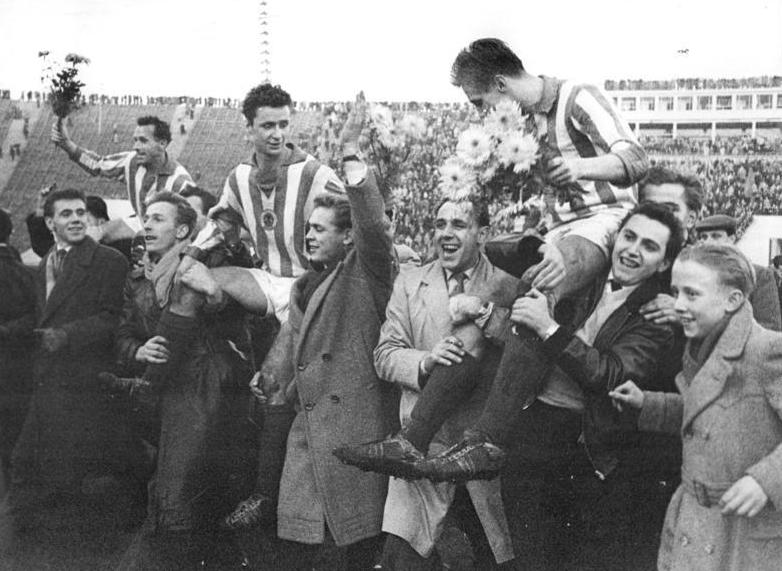
- Wismut Karl-Marx-Stadt players and supporters celebrate the 1959 championship
- Season: 1959
- Champions: SC Wismut Karl-Marx-Stadt
- Relegated: SC Turbine Erfurt; BSG Lokomotive Stendal
- European Cup: SC Wismut Karl-Marx-Stadt
- European Cup Winners' Cup: ASK Vorwärts Berlin
- Matches: 182
- Goals: 476 (2.62 per match)
- Top goalscorer: Bernd Bauchspieß (18)
- Total attendance: 1,785,000
- Average attendance: 9,808

The 1959 DDR-Oberliga was the eleventh season of the DDR-Oberliga, the first tier of league football in East Germany. Rather than in the traditional autumn-spring format the Oberliga played for six seasons from 1955 to 1960 in the calendar year format, modelled on the system used in the Soviet Union. From 1961–62 onwards the league returned to its traditional format.

The league was contested by fourteen teams. SC Wismut Karl-Marx-Stadt, incidentally based at Aue and not Karl-Marx-Stadt, won the championship, the club's last of three national East German championships. On the strength of the 1959 title Wismut qualified for the 1960–61 European Cup where the club was knocked out by SK Rapid Wien in the first round. League runners-up ASK Vorwärts Berlin qualified for the 1960–61 European Cup Winners' Cup instead of FDGB-Pokal winner SC Dynamo Berlin and was knocked out by Rudá Hvězda Brno in the preliminary round.

Bernd Bauchspieß of Chemie Zeitz was the league's top scorer with 18 goals.

== Table ==
The 1959 season saw two newly promoted clubs, BSG Lokomotive Stendal and Chemie Zeitz.

Pos	Team	Pld	W	D	L	GF	GA	GD	Pts	Qualification or relegation
1	SC Wismut Karl-Marx-Stadt (C)	26	17	5	4	44	25	+19	39	Qualification to European Cup preliminary round
2	ASK Vorwärts Berlin	26	13	9	4	49	24	+25	35	Qualification to Cup Winners' Cup preliminary round
3	SC Dynamo Berlin	26	14	5	7	46	26	+20	33	FDGB-Pokal winners
4	SC Empor Rostock	26	10	9	7	36	26	+10	29	
5	SC Motor Jena	26	10	9	7	29	27	+2	29	
6	SC Fortschritt Weißenfels	26	10	7	9	36	39	−3	27	
7	SC Aktivist Brieske-Senftenberg	26	8	8	10	36	30	+6	24	
8	BSG Motor Zwickau	26	9	6	11	30	32	−2	24	
9	SC Lokomotive Leipzig	26	8	8	10	28	36	−8	24	
10	BSG Chemie Zeitz	26	9	6	11	42	52	−10	24	
11	SC Rotation Leipzig	26	6	10	10	31	40	−9	22	
12	SC Einheit Dresden	26	4	11	11	23	42	−19	19	
13	SC Turbine Erfurt (R)	26	6	6	14	27	45	−18	18	Relegation to DDR-Liga
14	BSG Lokomotive Stendal (R)	26	4	9	13	19	32	−13	17	Relegation to DDR-Liga

(C) Champions; (R) Relegated

== Results ==
Home \ Away	ABS	CHZ	DBE	EIN	ROS	WEI	LLE	LST	MJE	ZWI	ROT	ERF	VBE	WIS
Aktivist Brieske-Senftenberg		3–1	3–1	1–1	0–0	3–1	2–0	2–0	1–1	2–0	0–2	6–0	0–0	1–2
Chemie Zeitz	4–3		0–0	1–1	3–1	3–1	1–2	1–0	2–3	3–0	2–2	3–2	2–0	3–1
Dynamo Berlin	2–0	4–2		5–0	2–1	4–0	5–0	2–2	1–0	1–0	2–1	2–0	1–2	1–1
Einheit Dresden	0–0	2–2	1–1		1–1	0–0	1–1	2–1	1–2	1–1	2–0	1–0	1–3	2–3
Empor Rostock	2–1	4–1	0–1	5–0		1–0	2–2	3–0	2–1	3–0	2–0	2–0	0–0	0–0
Fortschritt Weißenfels	2–1	3–1	3–1	4–1	1–1		1–0	1–0	0–2	1–1	2–2	3–1	1–4	2–1
Lokomotive Leipzig	1–1	1–1	0–2	2–0	1–2	3–1		0–0	2–1	1–2	2–2	2–1	1–0	0–2
Lokomotive Stendal	1–0	0–0	0–2	1–1	0–0	2–3	1–2		0–1	4–1	1–2	2–0	2–2	0–2
Motor Jena	3–0	0–2	1–1	0–1	1–0	0–0	0–0	1–1		1–1	1–0	2–1	1–4	2–0
Motor Zwickau	1–1	4–1	3–0	1–0	3–0	0–2	1–0	3–0	3–0		0–1	3–1	1–1	0–2
Rotation Leipzig	0–4	5–2	0–3	3–2	2–2	3–3	0–0	0–1	1–1	2–1		1–1	0–0	0–1
Turbine Erfurt	1–1	1–0	1–0	2–0	1–1	0–0	1–4	1–0	0–1	2–0	0–0		3–2	3–3
Vorwärts Berlin	3–0	7–0	3–1	0–0	3–1	2–0	3–1	0–0	2–2	0–0	2–1	3–2		2–1
Wismut Karl-Marx-Stadt	1–0	2–1	2–1	2–1	2–0	2–1	3–0	0–0	1–1	2–0	3–1	3–2	2–1	

Legend: Blue = home team win; Yellow = draw; Red = away team win.
