= Katja Kramarczyk =

German handball player (born 1984)

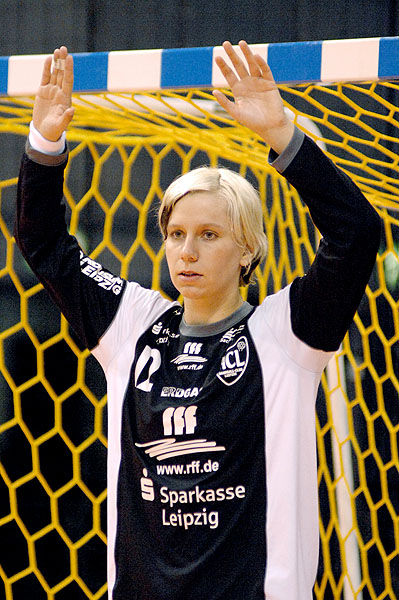

Personal information
- Nationality: German
- Born: 18 March 1984 (age 42) Frankfurt/Oder, Germany
- Height: 1.78 m (5 ft 10 in)

Sport
- Sport: Handball
- Position: Goalkeeper
- Current club: Retired
- Number: 12

Youth career
- Years: Team
- 1994–2002: Frankfurter HC

Senior clubs
- Years: Team
- 2002–2008: Frankfurter HC
- 2008–2016: HC Leipzig
- 2016–2018: Bayer Leverkusen
National team
Years	Team	Apps	(Gls)
2005–2017	Germany	140	(0)

Katja Kramarczyk (née Schülke) (born 18 March 1984) is a German retired handball player for Bayer Leverkusen and the German national team.

She participated at the 2011 World Women's Handball Championship in Brazil.
