= 1961–62 DDR-Oberliga =

DDR-Oberliga
- Season: 1961–62
- Champions: ASK Vorwärts Berlin
- Relegated: SC Einheit Dresden; BSG Lokomotive Stendal
- European Cup: ASK Vorwärts Berlin
- European Cup Winners' Cup: SC Chemie Halle
- Matches played: 273
- Goals scored: 851 (3.12 per match)
- Top goalscorer: Arthur Bialas (23)
- Total attendance: 2,207,900
- Average attendance: 8,088

The 1961–62 DDR-Oberliga was the 13th season of the DDR-Oberliga, the first tier of league football in East Germany. It was the first season played in the traditional autumn-spring format again after the Oberliga had played for six seasons from 1955 to 1960 in the calendar year format instead, modelled on the system used in the Soviet Union. The league was played as a triple round with a home-and-away round and an additional round of games at neutral venues to allow for an earlier start.

The league was contested by fourteen teams. National People's Army club ASK Vorwärts Berlin won the championship, the club's second consecutive one and third overall, eventually winning six national East German championships overall. On the strength of the 1961–62 title Vorwärts qualified for the 1962–63 European Cup where the club was knocked out by Dukla Prague in the preliminary round. Eleventh-placed club SC Chemie Halle qualified for the 1962–63 European Cup Winners' Cup as the seasons FDGB-Pokal winner and was knocked out by OFK Beograd in the preliminary round as well.

Arthur Bialas of SC Empor Rostock was the league's top scorer with 23 goals.

The 1961–62 season saw the third-most games played in an Oberliga season, 273. Only 1950–51 and 1951–52 had there been more, 306 and 342, when the league consisted of 18 and 19 clubs. The season also saw the lowest-ever average attendance with 8,088 per match.

== Table ==
The 1961–62 season saw two newly promoted clubs, SC Turbine Erfurt and BSG Lokomotive Stendal.

Pos	Team	Pld	W	D	L	GF	GA	GD	Pts	Qualification or relegation
1	ASK Vorwärts Berlin (C)	39	21	8	10	69	49	+20	50	Qualification to European Cup preliminary round
2	SC Empor Rostock	39	20	7	12	70	43	+27	47	
3	SC Dynamo Berlin	39	18	9	12	72	64	+8	45	
4	SC Motor Jena	39	15	13	11	77	60	+17	43	
5	BSG Motor Zwickau	39	16	9	14	59	66	−7	41	
6	SC Lokomotive Leipzig	39	15	10	14	67	57	+10	40	
7	SC Wismut Karl-Marx-Stadt (Note: SC Wismut Karl-Marx-Stadt deducted two points)	39	13	14	12	60	48	+12	38	
8	SC Rotation Leipzig	39	11	16	12	57	57	0	38	
9	SC Aufbau Magdeburg	39	16	5	18	59	63	−4	37	
10	SC Turbine Erfurt	39	13	9	17	66	69	−3	35	
11	SC Chemie Halle	39	11	12	16	53	66	−13	34	Qualification to Cup Winners' Cup preliminary round
12	SC Aktivist Brieske-Senftenberg	39	10	13	16	45	53	−8	33	
13	SC Einheit Dresden (R)	39	9	14	16	48	73	−25	32	Relegation to DDR-Liga
14	BSG Lokomotive Stendal (R)	39	12	7	20	49	83	−34	31	Relegation to DDR-Liga

(C) Champions; (R) Relegated

== Results ==
=== First and second round ===
Home \ Away	ABS	MAG	CHH	DBE	EIN	ROS	LLE	LST	MJE	ZWI	ROT	ERF	VBE	WIS
Aktivist Brieske-Senftenberg		2–0	1–1	2–1	5–1	2–0	0–0	2–0	1–3	4–1	0–2	1–2	2–3	0–0
Aufbau Magdeburg	0–2		1–0	0–1	1–0	0–3	2–0	3–2	1–1	5–0	0–1	3–4	2–1	3–1
Chemie Halle	1–1	2–1		2–5	2–4	0–2	0–1	1–2	3–1	0–1	0–0	0–3	2–1	2–2
Dynamo Berlin	1–0	5–3	0–2		2–2	1–4	1–1	3–2	2–1	1–1	2–0	5–1	1–3	0–1
Einheit Dresden	2–0	1–3	1–1	3–1		1–2	2–2	1–1	1–1	1–1	3–1	3–2	1–0	1–2
Empor Rostock	2–0	4–2	2–0	2–1	3–0		3–1	3–0	0–0	3–0	2–1	0–3	1–3	3–0
Lokomotive Leipzig	2–1	1–3	3–0	0–3	2–0	3–2		4–0	2–0	0–1	4–1	5–3	3–0	3–1
Lokomotive Stendal	1–1	2–2	3–3	0–2	0–0	1–2	2–3		1–3	4–0	0–0	2–1	0–1	2–0
Motor Jena	2–2	5–0	1–1	5–1	6–1	3–1	3–2	6–1		1–0	0–1	0–0	1–0	2–2
Motor Zwickau	2–0	2–1	2–2	1–3	0–1	2–1	1–1	4–3	4–2		3–0	3–2	3–0	3–1
Rotation Leipzig	6–1	1–2	2–2	4–3	1–1	0–0	1–1	5–1	1–1	2–2		2–0	3–1	0–0
Turbine Erfurt	1–3	0–1	4–1	1–2	1–1	0–3	1–0	5–0	1–1	4–2	1–1		1–2	3–3
Vorwärts Berlin	1–0	2–0	5–1	3–0	1–1	2–0	2–2	3–0	1–0	1–0	1–1	3–2		2–1
Wismut Karl-Marx-Stadt	3–1	5–0	2–4	1–1	1–1	3–0	0–0	4–0	3–0	3–0	4–1	4–0	2–3	

Legend: Blue = home team win; Yellow = draw; Red = away team win.

=== Third round ===
Home \ Away	ABS	MAG	CHH	DBE	EIN	ROS	LLE	LST	MJE	ZWI	ROT	ERF	VBE	WIS
Aktivist Brieske-Senftenberg			2–1		0–1		1–1	0–1			1–1			
Aufbau Magdeburg	2–0								1–3			3–2	0–2	0–0
Chemie Halle		2–1			1–1	0–1							3–1	
Dynamo Berlin	1–1	1–0	2–2		5–1	1–1	3–2				2–1			1–1
Einheit Dresden		1–1						1–2		2–2	0–3	0–2		1–3
Empor Rostock	1–2	0–1			6–0		0–0	4–1	2–2		3–1			0–0
Lokomotive Leipzig		2–2	2–3		3–2			0–1		1–2	1–2	3–0	2–4	2–1
Lokomotive Stendal		1–5	1–0	3–1					2–3		2–1			
Motor Jena	2–2		0–0	1–2	1–3						3–3	3–5		2–0
Motor Zwickau	1–1	1–0	0–4	3–1		2–1		4–0				1–1		0–1
Rotation Leipzig		0–4	3–1							1–1				1–2
Turbine Erfurt	2–0		0–1	2–2		2–1		1–2			1–1		2–1	
Vorwärts Berlin	1–1			1–2	2–1	2–2		1–1	3–1	3–1	1–1			
Wismut Karl-Marx-Stadt	0–0		1–2					0–2				0–0	2–2	

Legend: Blue = home team win; Yellow = draw; Red = away team win.
