= 1966–67 DDR-Oberliga =

DDR-Oberliga
- Season: 1966–67
- Champions: FC Karl-Marx-Stadt
- Relegated: BFC Dynamo; BSG Wismut Gera
- European Cup: FC Karl-Marx-Stadt
- European Cup Winners' Cup: BSG Motor Zwickau
- Inter-Cities Fairs Cup: 1. FC Lokomotive Leipzig; Dynamo Dresden
- Matches: 182
- Goals: 500 (2.75 per match)
- Top goalscorer: Hartmut Rentzsch (17)
- Total attendance: 1,832,000
- Average attendance: 10,066

The 1966–67 DDR-Oberliga was the 18th season of the DDR-Oberliga, the first tier of league football in East Germany.

The league was contested by fourteen teams. FC Karl-Marx-Stadt won the championship, the club's sole national East German championship, being a separate club from SC Wismut Karl-Marx-Stadt, a club that won three championships in the 1950s.

Hartmut Rentzsch of BSG Motor Zwickau was the league's top scorer with 17 goals, while Dieter Erler of FC Karl-Marx-Stadt won the seasons East German Footballer of the year award.

On the strength of the 1966–67 title Karl-Marx-Stadt qualified for the 1967–68 European Cup where the club was knocked out by R.S.C. Anderlecht in the first round. Third-placed club BSG Motor Zwickau qualified for the 1967–68 European Cup Winners' Cup as the seasons FDGB-Pokal winner and was knocked out by FC Torpedo Moscow in the first round. Second-placed 1. FC Lokomotive Leipzig qualified for the 1967–68 Inter-Cities Fairs Cup where it was knocked out in the second round by FK Vojvodina while fourth-placed Dynamo Dresden was knocked out by Rangers F.C. in the first round.

== Table ==
The 1966–67 season saw two newly promoted clubs, 1. FC Union Berlin and BSG Wismut Gera.

Pos	Team	Pld	W	D	L	GF	GA	GD	Pts	Qualification or relegation
1	FC Karl-Marx-Stadt (C)	26	14	9	3	39	23	+16	37	Qualification to European Cup first round
2	1. FC Lokomotive Leipzig	26	14	2	10	39	32	+7	30	Qualification to Inter-Cities Fairs Cup first round
3	BSG Motor Zwickau	26	9	9	8	41	26	+15	27	Qualification to Cup Winners' Cup first round
4	SG Dynamo Dresden	26	11	5	10	35	31	+4	27	Qualification to Inter-Cities Fairs Cup first round
5	FC Carl Zeiss Jena	26	11	5	10	31	29	+2	27	
6	1. FC Union Berlin	26	9	9	8	33	35	−2	27	
7	BSG Lokomotive Stendal	26	11	5	10	39	44	−5	27	
8	FC Vorwärts Berlin	26	10	6	10	43	34	+9	26	
9	BSG Wismut Aue	26	11	4	11	45	43	+2	26	
10	F.C. Hansa Rostock	26	9	8	9	27	27	0	26	
11	Hallescher FC Chemie	26	11	4	11	38	41	−3	26	
12	BSG Chemie Leipzig	26	9	7	10	35	38	−3	25	
13	Berliner FC Dynamo (R)	26	6	9	11	28	40	−12	21	Relegation to DDR-Liga
14	BSG Wismut Gera (R)	26	4	4	18	27	57	−30	12	Relegation to DDR-Liga

(C) Champions; (R) Relegated

== Results ==
Home \ Away	BFC	CZJ	CHM	DRE	HFC	HRO	KMS	LLE	LST	ZWI	UNI	VBE	AUE	WGE
BFC Dynamo		3–1	2–1	0–1	0–1	0–1	1–1	0–3	2–2	0–2	1–2	1–1	4–3	2–1
Carl Zeiss Jena	1–3		2–0	0–1	0–0	1–0	0–0	2–1	3–1	1–0	5–0	2–1	0–1	1–1
Chemie Leipzig	1–1	2–3		2–0	1–0	3–3	2–1	0–2	3–0	1–0	1–1	0–2	3–2	3–1
Dynamo Dresden	2–0	1–0	3–2		2–1	0–0	0–1	0–1	3–0	0–0	1–1	0–3	6–1	6–1
Hallescher FC Chemie	1–2	2–1	3–1	1–2		2–1	0–0	3–0	2–2	0–4	2–1	2–0	5–2	2–0
Hansa Rostock	0–0	2–0	1–1	1–0	4–2		0–1	1–0	1–1	1–1	1–1	2–1	2–1	2–0
Karl-Marx-Stadt	1–0	2–2	1–1	4–1	3–1	2–0		2–0	2–0	2–1	2–2	3–2	1–0	2–1
Lokomotive Leipzig	3–0	3–1	3–0	2–1	2–0	1–0	0–2		3–1	1–0	0–3	4–2	2–1	4–2
Lokomotive Stendal	2–0	1–0	4–1	2–0	0–2	1–0	2–0	2–2		1–0	2–2	3–2	2–1	5–0
Motor Zwickau	2–0	2–0	2–3	1–1	4–0	0–0	1–1	1–1	6–2		5–0	2–1	2–1	3–1
Union Berlin	3–0	1–1	0–3	2–2	0–0	3–0	1–2	1–0	3–1	3–0		0–0	0–3	1–0
Vorwärts Berlin	1–1	0–1	0–0	0–1	5–1	2–1	3–1	2–0	3–0	0–0	1–0		2–2	5–1
Wismut Aue	1–1	0–1	1–0	2–1	4–3	1–0	2–2	3–0	2–0	2–2	2–1	3–0		0–1
Wismut Gera	2–2	1–2	0–0	3–0	0–2	2–3	0–0	2–1	1–2	1–0	0–1	3–4	2–4	

Legend: Blue = home team win; Yellow = draw; Red = away team win.
