= Katja Langkeit =

German handball player (born 1983)

Personal information
- Nationality: German
- Born: 22 November 1983 (age 42) Rostock, Germany
- Height: 1.76 m (5 ft 9 in)

Sport
- Sport: Handball
- Position: Left Wing
- Current club: Retired

Youth career
- Years: Team
- –: HC Empor Rostock
- –: HC Leipzig

Senior clubs
- Years: Team
- 2001-2007: HC Leipzig
- 2007-2009: Rhein-Main Bienen
- 2009-2011: HSG Blomberg-Lippe
- 2011-2013: Buxtehuder SV
National team
Years	Team	Apps	(Gls)
2006-2013	Germany	17	(28)
- Updated on 5 February 2024

Katja Langkeit (born 1983) is a German former team handball player. She plays on the German national team, and participated at the 2011 World Women's Handball Championship in Brazil.

She won the German Bundesliga in 2006 with HC Leipzig.
