= Renate Urne =

Norwegian handball player (born 1982)

Personal information
- Nationality: Norwegian
- Born: 11 June 1982 (age 44)
- Height: 181 cm (71 in)

Sport
- Sport: Handball
- Position: Center Back
- Current club: Retired
National team
Years	Team	Apps	(Gls)
2003–2009	Norway	20	(15)
Medal record
World Championship
Bronze medal – third place	2009 China	Team
- Updated on 10 December 2009

Renate Urne (born 11 June 1982) is a retired Norwegian international handballer. She played in her native Norway for Erdal IL, IL Bjørnar and Tertnes HE, before moving to German side HC Leipzig in 2007. She stayed in Leipzig until her retirement in 2011.

Urne made her debut on the Norwegian national team in 2003, and has played a total of 20 matches and scored 15 goals. She made her final appearance in the national team at the 2009 World Women's Handball Championship against Romania, winning the match 25–24, and winning the bronze medal at the championship.
