= Karolina Szwed-Orneborg =

Polish handball player (born 1989)

Personal information
- Nationality: Polish
- Born: 23 April 1989 (age 37) Gdańsk, Poland
- Height: 1.83 m (6 ft 0 in)

Sport
- Sport: Handball
- Position: Central back
- Number: 21
National team
Years	Team	Apps	(Gls)
–	Poland	35	(43)

Karolina Szwed-Orneborg (born 23 April 1989) is a former Polish handball player. She played for the club HC Leipzig, the Polish national team and represented Poland at the 2013 World Women's Handball Championship in Serbia.
