= Julia Weise =

German handball player (born 2000)

Personal information
- Full name: Julia Weise
- Nationality: German
- Born: 19 January 2000 (age 26) Germany
- Height: 1.80 m (5 ft 11 in)

Sport
- Sport: Handball
- Position: Right wing
- Current club: HC Leipzig
- Number: 35

Youth career
- Years: Team
- 2006–2014: Nordhäuser SV
- 2014–2016: HC Leipzig

Senior clubs
- Years: Team
- 2016–: HC Leipzig

Julia Weise (born 19 January 2000) is a German handballer who plays for HC Leipzig.

In September 2018, she was included by EHF in a list of the twenty best young handballers to watch for the future.

== Individual awards ==
- Thüringer Allgemeine Sportswoman of the Year: 2014
