= DDR-Oberliga (women's handball) =

East German women's handball league

The Women's Handball DDR-Oberliga was the highest category in the championship for women's handball in East Germany. Founded in 1951, 41 editions took place before the competition was disestablished in 1991 following the reunification of Germany. SC Leipzig was the championship's most successful team with fifteen championships between 1953 and 1991, followed by Fortschritt Weissenfels and Vorwärts Frankfurt with six, TSC Berlin with four and Empor Rostock with three.

The leading teams in the DDR-Oberliga were also successful in international competitions. SC Leipzig won two European Cups and one EHF Cup, TSC Berlin also won the European Cup and two Cup Winners' Cups and Vorwärts Frankfurt clinched two EHF Cups, while Empor Rostock and SC Magdeburg also played European finals. Leipzig would later become one of the leading teams of the Bundesliga, with six championships between 1998 and 2010.

== List of champions ==
- 1951 BSG KWU Weimar
- 1952 SC Berlin Weissensee
- 1953 Rotation Leipzig-Mitte
- 1954 BSG Einheit Weimar
- 1955 SC Fortschritt Weissenfels
- 1956 BSG Lokomotive Rangsdorf
- 1957 BSG Lokomotive Leipzig
- 1958 SC Fortschritt Weissenfels
- 1959 SC Fortschritt Weissenfels
- 1960 BSG Chemie Zietz
- 1961 BSG Lokomotive Rangsdorf
- 1962 BSG Fortschritt Weissenfels
- 1963 BSG Fortschritt Weissenfels
- 1964 BSG Fortschritt Weissenfels
- 1965 SC Leipzig
- 1966 SC Empor Rostock
- 1967 SC Empor Rostock
- 1968 SC Leipzig
- 1969 SC Leipzig
- 1970 SC Leipzig
- 1971 SC Leipzig
- 1972 SC Leipzig
- 1973 SC Leipzig
- 1974 TSC Berlin
- 1975 SC Leipzig
- 1976 SC Leipzig
- 1977 TSC Berlin
- 1978 SC Leipzig
- 1979 TSC Berlin
- 1980 TSC Berlin
- 1981 SC Magdeburg
- 1982 ASK Vorwärts Frankfurt
- 1983 ASK Vorwärts Frankfurt
- 1984 SC Leipzig
- 1985 ASK Vorwärts Frankfurt
- 1986 ASK Vorwärts Frankfurt
- 1987 ASK Vorwärts Frankfurt
- 1988 SC Leipzig
- 1989 HC Empor Rostock
- 1990 ASK Vorwärts Frankfurt
- 1991 SC Leipzig

== See also ==
- DDR-Oberliga (men's league)
