= Handball Club Leipzig =

German handball club

- Full name: Handball-Club Leipzig e. V.
- Short name: HCL
- Founded: 1893; 133 years ago _{as SC Lokomotive Leipzig} 1999; 27 years ago as HC Leipzig
- Arena: Sportcenter Markranstädt
- Capacity: 1.200
- Head coach: Erik Töpfer
- League: 1. Handball-Bundesliga
- 2026-2027: 1. Handball-Bundesliga, 12th
| Home | Away |

Handball-Club Leipzig e. V., normally called HC Leipzig or just HCL, is a women's handball club based in Leipzig, Germany. They currently play in the Bundesliga. They have historically been considered one of the best German women's handball clubs with many domestic and international titles.

== History ==
The roots to HC leipzig goes a long way back. In 1963 the handball sections of SC Lokomotive Leipzig and BSG Rotation Leipzig-Mitte fused to become SC Leipzig. Prior to the formation, both clubs had each won the East German Championship once. After the formation they won 13 East German Championships as well as the European Cup in 1966 and 1974.

SC Leipzig was dissolved in 1993, and various sections of the clubs joined different clubs from Leipzig. The women's handball section joined VfB Leipzig. However, VfB Leipzig ran into economic difficulty in the late 1990s, and to preserve the handball team, the independent club HC Leipzig was formed. In their first season under the new name, the club won the DHB Pokal.

In the second half of the 2016-17 season it was revealed that HCL had accumulated a debt of €1.3 million, and therefore had to file for insolvency, for which they were deducted four points. The following summer the team lost their Bundesliga license due to the debt, and was thus relegated to the 3. Liga. The decision was appealed by the club, but later rejected by the Bundesliga. The case was then taken to the board of the German Handball Association, which ruled that HCL could keep their license, subject to the condition that an irrevocable payment of an equity increase of €600,000 be made by July 14, 2017, and that all outstanding wages be paid up to and including June 2017. Despite the favourable ruling, the club could not pay the amount in time, and the club subsequently filed for insolvency, and had to restart in the 3. Liga on the license of their former second team.

In 2019 the club was promoted to the 2. Bundesliga.

In 2026, after an absence of 9 years, the club was promoted back to the 1. Bundesliga.

== Kits ==
HOME
| 2013-14 | 2014–15 | 2016-17 |

AWAY
| 2013-14 | 2016-17 |

== Honours ==
=== Domestic competitions ===
- Handball-Bundesliga Frauen:
  - Champions (6): 1998, 1999, 2002, 2006, 2009, 2010
- German Cup:
  - Winners (7): 1996, 2000, 2006, 2007, 2008, 2014, 2016
- German Supercup:
  - Winners (1): 2008
- DDR-Oberliga:
  - Champions (15): 1953, 1957, 1965, 1968, 1969, 1970, 1971, 1972, 1973, 1975, 1976, 1978, 1984, 1988, 1991
- FDGB-Pokal:
  - Winners (3): 1971, 1983, 1987

=== European competitions ===
- EHF Women's Champions League:
  - Winners (2): 1966, 1974
  - Runners-Up (4): 1967, 1970, 1972, 1977
- EHF Women's Cup Winners' Cup:
  - Runners-Up (2): 1978, 1997
- Women's EHF Cup:
  - Winners (2): 1986, 1992
  - Runners-Up (1): 2009

== European record ==
| Season | Competition | Round | Club | 1st leg | 2nd leg | Aggregate |
|---|---|---|---|---|---|---|
| 2016–17 | EHF Champions League | Q1 | (Belarus) HC Gomel | 29–18 | | 1st place |
| 2016–17 | EHF Champions League | Q1 | (Austria) Hypo Niederösterreich | 32–30 | | 1st place |
| 2016–17 | EHF Champions League | Group B | (North Macedonia) Vardar | 22–45 | 24–41 | 4th place |
| 2016–17 | EHF Champions League | Group B | (Hungary) FTC-Rail Cargo Hungaria | 17–30 | 22–26 | 4th place |
| 2016–17 | EHF Champions League | Group B | (Russia) HC Astrakhanochka | 30–27 | 24–27 | 4th place |
| 2016–17 | EHF Cup | Group B | (Russia) HC Kuban Krasnodar | 27–33 | 24–32 | 4th place |
| 2016–17 | EHF Cup | Group B | (France) Brest Bretagne Handball | 15–34 | 20–23 | 4th place |
| 2016–17 | EHF Cup | Group B | (Hungary) Alba Fehérvár KC | 21–34 | 27–29 | 4th place |

== Team ==
=== Current squad ===
Squad for the 2021–22 season

==== Goalkeeper ====
- 16 Anna Kröber
- 26 Annabell Krüeger

==== Fields ====
- 2 Pauline Uhlmann
- 3 Lara Seidel
- 7 Julia Weise
- 10 Emely Theilig
- 14 Hanna Ferber-Rahnhöfer
- 20 Sharleen Greschner
- 22 Emily Glimm
- 23 Tyra Bessert
- 24 Lotta Röpcke
- 25 Lilli Röpcke
- 33 Christin Conrad
- 36 Stefanie Hummel
- 35 Jacqueline Hummel
- 41 Wiebke Meyer
- 99 Nina Reißberg

==== Technical Staff ====
- Club Manager: Torsten Brunnquell
- Head Coach: Fabian Kunze
- Assistant Coach: Philip Brommann
- Goalkeeping Coach: Wieland Schmidt
- Physiotherapist: Sophie Höpfner

Squad for the 2017–18 season

Goalkeeper

- 12 (Germany) Helen Keller
- 16 (Germany) Anna Kröber
- 28 (Germany) Anja Kreitzick

Fields

- 2 (Germany) Pauline Uhrmann
- 3 (Germany) Anna Ansorge
- 5 (Germany) Isabell Hurst
- 6 (Germany) Celina Matthey
- 7 (Germany) Julia Weise
- 8 (Germany) Beatrix Kerestely
- 9 (Germany) Antonia Herzig
- 10 (Germany) Emely Thellig
- 13 (Germany) Anna Lena Plate
- 15 (Germany) Johanna Schierbok
- 17 (Germany) Lea Guderian
- 20 (Germany) Sharleen Greschner
- 22 (Germany) Lucie-Marie Kretzschmar
- 23 (Germany) Francisca Buth
- 25 (Germany) Lilli Röpcke
- 27 (Germany) Leonie Rauschenbach

=== Technical staff ===
- Club Manager: Kay-Sven Hähner
- Head Coach: Norman Rentsch
- Assistant Coach: Max Berthold
- Goalkeeping Coach: Wieland Schmidt
- Fitness and Athletics Coach: Isabelle Kellmann
- Physiotherapist: Christian Markus
- Physiotherapist: Danilo Menge
- Team Doctor: Dr. Gotthard Knoll

== Notable former players ==
- (Germany) Natalie Augsburg
- (Germany) Nora Reiche
- (Germany) Ulrike Stange
- (Germany) Katja Schülke
- (Germany) Luisa Schulze
- (Germany) Susann Müller
- (Germany) Anne Müller
- (Germany) Katja Langkeit
- (Germany) Nina Müller
- (Germany) Grit Jurack
- (Germany) Anne Hubinger
- (Germany) Saskia Lang
- (Germany) Franziska Mietzner
- (Germany) Shenia Minevskaja
- (Sweden) Sara Eriksson
- (Sweden) Sara Holmgren
- (Poland) Karolina Kudlacz
- (Poland) Karolina Szwed
- (Netherlands) Debbie Bont
- (Netherlands) Maura Visser
- (Netherlands) Jessy Kramer
- (Denmark) Rikke Nielsen
- (Denmark) Louise Lyksborg
- (Brazil) Chana Masson
- (Brazil) Idalina Borges Mesquita
- (Norway) Else Marthe Sörlie Lybekk
- (Norway) Renate Urne
- (Romania) Ionica Munteanu

== See also ==
- SC Lokomotive Leipzig
