= DDR-Oberliga =

Former top-level association football league in East Germany

DDR Oberliga
- Organising body: Deutscher Fußball-Verband der DDR (DFV)
- Founded: 1948; 78 years ago
- Folded: 1991; 35 years ago
- Replaced by: Bundesliga
- Country: East Germany
- Level on pyramid: Level 1
- Relegation to: DDR Liga Staffel A; DDR Liga Staffel B
- Domestic cup: FDGB-Pokal
- International cup(s): European Cup; UEFA Cup
- Last champions: Hansa Rostock (1990–91)
- Most championships: BFC Dynamo (10 titles)

The DDR-Oberliga (English: East German Premier League or GDR Premier League) was the top-level association football league in East Germany.

== Overview ==
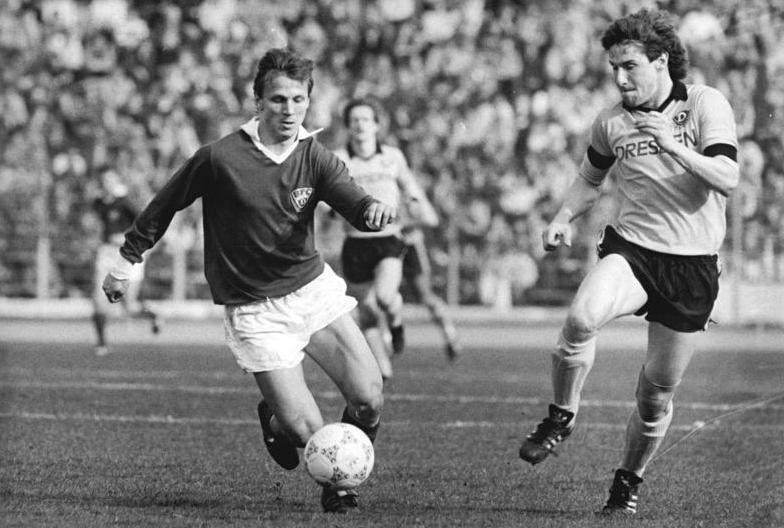
The match between BFC Dynamo and Dynamo Dresden on 6 April 1988.

Following World War II, separate sports competitions emerged in the occupied eastern and western halves of Germany, replacing the Gauligas of the Nazi era.

In East Germany, a top-flight football competition, the highest league in the East German football league system, was established in 1949 as the DS-Oberliga (Deutscher Sportausschuss Oberliga, German Sports Association Upper League). Beginning in 1958, it carried the name DDR-Oberliga and was part of the league structure within the DFV (Deutscher Fussball-Verband der DDR, German Football Association of the GDR).

In its inaugural season in 1949/50, the DDR-Oberliga was made up of 14 teams with two relegation spots. Over the course of the next four seasons, the number of teams in the division varied and included anywhere from 17 to 19 sides with three or four relegation spots. Beginning with the 1954/55 season up until merger of the East and West German football associations in 1991/92 the league was made up of 14 teams with 2 relegation spots.

Initially, the DDR-Oberliga operated on an autumn-spring schedule, as was traditional in Germany. From 1956 to 1960, a Soviet-style spring-autumn (calendar year) schedule was in place. This required a transition round in 1955 and, although no champion was formally declared that season, SC Wismut Karl-Marx-Stadt finished atop the division. 1961/62 saw the return of an autumn-spring season and an extended schedule (39 matches vs. 26 matches) was played with each club meeting the others a total of three times – once at home, once away, and once at a neutral venue.

After German reunification, the last regular DDR-Oberliga season was played in 1990/91 under the designation NOFV-Oberliga (Nordostdeutsche Fußballverband Oberliga or Northeast German Football Federation Premier League). The following year, the East German league structure was merged into the West German system under the German Football Association (Deutscher Fussball Bund) and the top two NOFV-Oberliga clubs – FC Hansa Rostock and Dynamo Dresden – joined the first division Bundesliga.

For the duration of the league's existence, the league below it was the DDR-Liga.

== Disbanding of the Oberliga ==
The Oberliga was disbanded after the 1990–91 season and its clubs were integrated in the German football league system. The fourteen Oberliga clubs went to the following leagues, spread over three tiers:

To the Fussball-Bundesliga (Tier I):

- 1. FC Dynamo Dresden
- FC Hansa Rostock

To the 2. Bundesliga Nord (Tier II):

- BSV Stahl Brandenburg

To the 2. Bundesliga Süd (Tier II):

- 1. FC Lokomotive Leipzig
- Chemnitzer FC
- FC Carl Zeiss Jena
- FC Rot-Weiß Erfurt
- Hallescher FC

To the NOFV-Oberliga Nord (Tier III):

- FC Berlin
- Eisenhüttenstädter FC Stahl
- FC Vorwärts Frankfurt/Oder

To the NOFV-Oberliga Mitte (Tier III):

- 1. FC Magdeburg
- FC Energie Cottbus

To the NOFV-Oberliga Süd (Tier III):

- FC Sachsen Leipzig

== The Oberliga reformed as the Regionalliga Nordost ==
In 1994, a new third tier division was established in the area that formerly made up East Germany. The Regionalliga Nordost was made up of most of the big names of the DDR-era alongside clubs from West Berlin. The only clubs from the final season of the old DDR-Oberliga not to appear here were FC Hansa Rostock, which was competing at the Bundesliga level, and Hallescher FC, which had fallen on hard times.

The league was disbanded again in 2000 and its member clubs were spread between the two remaining Regionalligas (III) and the NOFV-Oberligas (IV), effectively ending the history of the all-East German leagues.

The Regionalliga Nordost returned in 2012/13 as one of five fourth-tier regional leagues. The new league will cover the area of the former GDR and Berlin and the champions of this new division will qualify for a play-off against the winner of another Regionalliga or against the second-placed team in the Regionalliga Südwest to determine promotion to the 3. Liga.

== DDR-Oberliga champions ==
BFC Dynamo was the league record holder with 10 DDR-Oberliga titles to its credit, having won all of these titles in successive seasons.

Season	Club
1948	SG Planitz
1949	ZSG Union Halle
1949–50	ZSG Horch Zwickau
1950–51	BSG Chemie Leipzig
1951–52	BSG Turbine Halle
1952–53	SG Dynamo Dresden
1953–54	BSG Turbine Erfurt
1954–55	BSG Turbine Erfurt
1955	SC Wismut Karl Marx Stadt (Note: Transition season, not recognised as an official championship.)
1956	SC Wismut Karl Marx Stadt
1957	SC Wismut Karl Marx Stadt
1958	ASK Vorwärts Berlin
1959	SC Wismut Karl Marx Stadt
1960	ASK Vorwärts Berlin
1961–62	ASK Vorwärts Berlin

Season	Club
1962–63	SC Motor Jena
1963–64	BSG Chemie Leipzig
1964–65	ASK Vorwärts Berlin
1965–66	FC Vorwärts Berlin
1966–67	FC Karl-Marx-Stadt
1967–68	FC Carl Zeiss Jena
1968–69	FC Vorwärts Berlin
1969–70	FC Carl Zeiss Jena
1970–71	SG Dynamo Dresden
1971–72	1. FC Magdeburg
1972–73	SG Dynamo Dresden
1973–74	1. FC Magdeburg
1974–75	1. FC Magdeburg
1975–76	SG Dynamo Dresden
1976–77	SG Dynamo Dresden

Season	Club
1977–78	SG Dynamo Dresden
1978–79	BFC Dynamo
1979–80	BFC Dynamo
1980–81	BFC Dynamo
1981–82	BFC Dynamo
1982–83	BFC Dynamo
1983–84	BFC Dynamo
1984–85	BFC Dynamo
1985–86	BFC Dynamo
1986–87	BFC Dynamo
1987–88	BFC Dynamo
1988–89	SG Dynamo Dresden
1989–90	SG Dynamo Dresden
1990–91	FC Hansa Rostock
DDR-Oberliga was dissolved due to German reunification.

== Placings in the DDR-Oberliga 1975–1991 ==
Clubs are named by the last names they carried before the German reunification, which are not necessarily their current ones.

Club	1975	1976	1977	1978	1979	1980	1981	1982	1983	1984	1985	1986	1987	1988	1989	1990	1991
FC Hansa Rostock	13	—	14	—	14	—	10	8	8	9	10	13	—	9	4	6	1
SG Dynamo Dresden	3	1	1	1	2	2	4	2	7	2	2	6	2	3	1	1	2
Berliner FC Dynamo	4	2	4	3	1	1	1	1	1	1	1	1	1	1	2	4	11
1. FC Magdeburg	1	3	2	2	4	4	3	6	6	5	5	4	5	7	6	3	10
FC Carl Zeiss Jena	2	5	3	5	3	3	2	5	3	10	7	3	6	6	8	5	6
1. FC Lokomotive Leipzig	8	4	5	4	5	6	6	3	4	3	3	2	3	2	5	8	7
FC Karl-Marx-Stadt	10	11	9	7	8	9	9	9	9	6	9	8	8	8	3	2	5
FC Rot-Weiß Erfurt	9	7	6	9	7	12	7	7	5	7	6	10	7	12	12	11	3
FC Vorwärts Frankfurt	5	12	12	13	—	5	5	4	2	4	8	9	10	13	—	—	14
BSG Wismut Aue	12	6	10	11	11	10	12	10	10	8	4	11	4	10	7	13	—
Hallescher FC Chemie	11	8	7	6	6	7	8	11	11	14	—	—	—	5	9	9	4
BSG Sachsenring Zwickau	7	9	8	10	12	8	11	12	14	—	—	14	—	—	13	—	—
1. FC Union Berlin	—	—	11	8	10	13	—	—	12	13	—	7	11	11	14	—	—
BSG Stahl Riesa	6	10	13	—	9	11	13	—	—	11	12	12	12	14	—	—	—
BSG Stahl Brandenburg	—	—	—	—	—	—	—	—	—	—	11	5	9	4	11	10	8
BSG Energie Cottbus	—	14	—	—	—	—	—	13	—	—	—	—	13	—	10	7	13
BSG Chemie Leipzig	—	13	—	—	—	14	—	—	—	12	13	—	—	—	—	—^{1}	12
BSG Chemie Böhlen	—	—	—	12	13	—	14	—	13	—		—	—	—	—	—^{1}	12
BSG Fortschritt Bischofswerda	—	—	—	—	—	—	—	—	—	—	—	—	14	—	—	14	—
BSG Stahl Eisenhüttenstadt	—	—	—	—	—	—	—	—	—	—	—	—	—	—	—	12	9
BSG Motor Suhl	—	—	—	—	—	—	—	—	—	—	14	—	—	—	—	—	—
BSG Chemie Buna Schkopau^{2}	—	—	—	—	—	—	—	14	—	—	—	—	—	—	—	—	—
BSG Wismut Gera	—	—	—	14	—	—	—	—	—	—	—	—	—	—	—	—	—
ASG Vorwärts Stralsund	14	—	—	—	—	—	—	—	—	—	—	—	—	—	—	—	—

Source: "DDR-Oberliga". Das deutsche Fussball-Archiv.

- ^{1} BSG Chemie Leipzig (since May 1990 named FC Grün-Weiß Leipzig) and BSG Chemie Böhlen merged in August 1990, to form FC Sachsen Leipzig.
- ^{2} The club would continue as SV Merseburg 99 (de) following German reunification. SV Merseburg 99 merged with VfB IMO Merseburg in 2019 to form 1. FC Merseburg (de).

== See also ==
- Regionalliga Nordost
- NOFV-Oberliga
- NOFV-Oberliga Süd
- NOFV-Oberliga Mitte
- NOFV-Oberliga Nord
