= Frankfurter HC =

German handball club

- Full name: Frankfurter Handball Club
- Short name: Frankfurter HC
- Founded: 1994; 32 years ago
- Arena: Brandenburg-Halle, Frankfurt (Oder)
- Capacity: 2,500
- President: Uwe Böhm
- Head coach: Dietmar Schmidt
- League: 3. Liga
- 2024-25: 4th
- Club colours
| Home | Away |

Frankfurter Handball Club is a German women's handball from Frankfurt (Oder).

== History ==
During the communist era Frankfurter HC was the handball section of military sports club ASK Vorwärts, installed in Frankfurt since 1971. Vorwärts was one of the most successful East German team in the 1980s, winning six national championships between 1982 and 1990. It was also successful in international competitions, winning two EHF Cups in 1985 and 1990.

Following the reunification of Germany the ASK Vorwärts society was disbanded in 1991, and Frankfurt became an independent club and joined the Handball-Bundesliga as BFV Frankfurt. In 1994 the club merged with local team and took its current name.

While the club's status has decreased following the reunification Frankfurter has still been fairly successful since, winning the 1997 EHF City Cup, the 2003 National Cup and the 2004 championship. Most recently it was sixth in 2011, qualifying for the EHF Cup.

After the 2012-13 on July 2nd, 2013 the club was declared bankrupt and had to continue in the 3. Liga.

== Titles ==
- EHF Cup
  - 1985, 1990
- Challenge Cup
  - 1997
- DDR-Oberliga
  - 1982, 1983, 1985, 1986, 1987, 1990
- DDR-Pokal
  - 1981, 1982, 1984, 1986, 1990
- Bundesliga
  - 2004
- DHB-Pokal
  - 2003
