= 1. FC Frankfurt =

German football club

- Full name: 1. Fußballclub Frankfurt (Oder) E.V. e.V.
- Founded: 2 August 1951; 75 years ago as SV VP Vorwärts Leipzig
- Ground: Stadion der Freundschaft
- Capacity: 12,000
- President: Markus Derling
- Manager: Sascha Kloß
- League: NOFV-Oberliga Süd (V)
- 2025–26: Brandenburg-Liga, 1st of 16 (champions and promoted)
- Website: http://www.fcfrankfurt.de/
Home colours	Away colours

1. Fußballclub Frankfurt (Oder) E. V. e. V., commonly known as 1. FC Frankfurt, is a German football club based in Frankfurt (Oder), Brandenburg. The club was founded as the army club SV VP Vorwärts Leipzig in Leipzig in East Germany in 1951. The club won six East German championships as ASK Vorwärts Berlin and FC Vorwärts Berlin between 1958 and 1969.

== History ==
1. FC Frankfurt originally began as the football department of sports club SV VP Vorwärts Leipzig. The sports club was founded on 2 August 1951 and its first team was admitted to the 1951–52 DDR-Oberliga.

One of the characteristics of East German football after World War II, under the Soviet occupation and the socialist East German regime, was the willingness of the authorities to manipulate teams and clubs in various ways for political or other reasons.

The first team of SV Vorwärts der KVP Leipzig was relocated to East Berlin in 1953 and continued as SV Vorwärts der KVP Berlin The football team that began the 1952–53 DDR-Oberliga in Leipzig thus finished the season based in East Berlin. The sports club would undergo several name changes in the following years, before it was finally known as ASK Vorwärts Berlin.

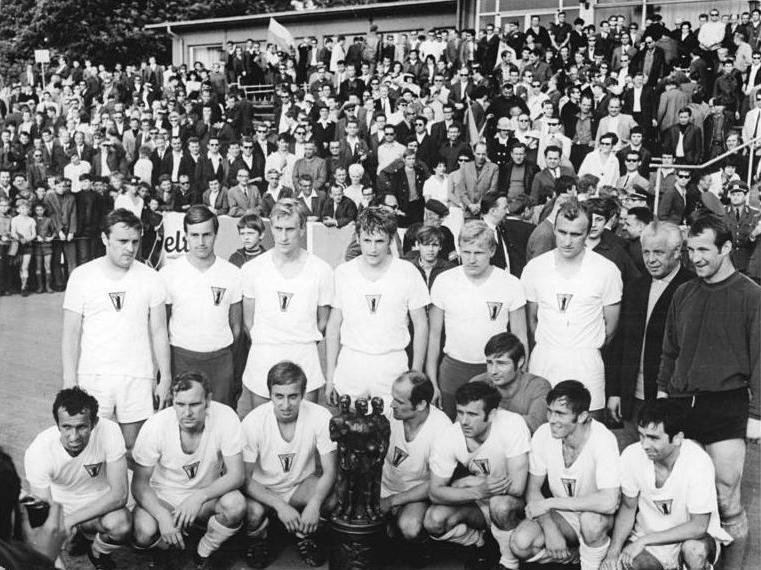
The cup-winning team of 1970

The club began a run of success in 1954 which included an FDGB-Pokal (East German Cup) that year, East German championships in 1958, 1960, 1962, and 1965, as well as losing appearances in the 1956 FDGB-Pokal, and the 1957 and 1959 national finals. Their success continued after the team was again renamed as the football department of ASK Vorwärts Berlin was separated from the sports club and reformed as FC Vorwärts Berlin, one of the new centralized football clubs formed to increase the level of performance throughout the country. Vorwärts won another two championships (1966, 1969) and in 1970 again made a losing appearance in the FDGB-Pokal final. Throughout the entire period from 1951 to 1971, the side played in the DDR Oberliga (top tier).

In 1971, the club was moved again, this time from the capital to Frankfurt an der Oder on the German-Polish border, to replace the local secret police-sponsored side SG Dynamo, which was then disbanded.

The decision to relocate the club to Frankfurt an der Oder was made by the Ministry for Defence. The main reason for the relocation of FC Vorwärts Berlin out of East Berlin was the Four Power Agreement between the Allied Powers, which envisaged a demilitarized Berlin. FC Vorwärts Berlin was a unit of the National People's Army. The relocation also aimed to strengthen football in the regional district Bezirk Frankfurt. However, the exact reasons for decision has not been fully clarified. The relocation may also have been the result of political horse trading. (Note: German journalist Karl Hübner points out that other National People's Army units remained in East Berlin, such as the Military District Command and the Music and Dance Ensemble, a fact which he believes supports the theory that the Four Power Agreement was just a pretext to conceal the horse trading behind the relocation.)

German author Rüdiger Wenzke writes that the relocation was "probably" the result of political intrigues by the Ministry for State Security and the SED. German author Hans Joachim Teichler writes that all speculations end up with the head of the Ministry for State Security and the president of SV Dynamo Erich Mielke. Teichler suggest that Mielke "must have somehow" convinced the Minister for National Defence Heinz Hoffmann that two clubs of the armed organs in Berlin were too many. Mielke regarded FC Vortwärts Berlin as a competitor to BFC Dynamo in the capital. His fellow Politburo member and SED First Secretary in Bezirk Frankfurt, Erich Mückenberger, on the other end, anticipated a boost for the Bezirk Frankfurt. Mückenberger had been persistent in his efforts to persuade Defense Minister Hoffmann.

However, the relocation of FC Vorwärts Berlin to Frankfurt an der Oder, followed on the relocation of sports club ASK Vorwärts Berlin to Frankfurt an der Oder. Army sports had become concentrated in Bezirk Frankfurt. ASK Vorwärts Berlin, from which FC Vorwärts Berlin was spun off in 1966, and which had its headquarters in Bezirk Frankfurt, had been delegated to Frankfurt an der Oder in 1969, and was now called ASK Vorwärts Frankfurt. The Presidium of the German Gymnastics and Sports Federation (DTSB) had adopted the 1969 Competitive Sports Resolution on 22 April 1969. (Note: The formal name of the Competitive Sports Resolution was "The further development of competitive sport up to the 1972 Olympic Games" (Die weitere Entwicklung des Leistungssports bis zu den Olympischen Spielen 1972).) The resolution stated, among other things that: "ASK Vorwärts Berlin, with its headquarters in Frankfurt (Oder), shall gradually be moved to the district capital under the name ASK Vorwärts Frankfurt (Oder). The sports club SC Frankfurt (Oder) shall be dissolved." The decision to relocate FC Vorwärts Berlin to Frankfurt an der Oder had been carefully prepared. A delegation from East Berlin had traveled to Frankfurt an der Oder to inspect the location as early as February 1971.

Vorwärts enjoyed another decent run in the 1980s, going to the UEFA Cup four times (where they were twice knocked out by West German clubs, (Werder Bremen and VfB Stuttgart). In 1983 they finished second nationally.

After German reunification in 1990, the club dropped its affiliation with the army and became FC Victoria Frankfurt/Oder. After financial problems and re-organization in 1993 the side emerged as Frankfurter FC Viktoria (FFC Viktoria 91). In the early 1990s, they played a couple of seasons in tier III before slipping to division IV and V level play. The side then played in the Brandenburg-Liga (VI) before, on 1 July 2012, merging with MSV Eintracht Frankfurt to become 1. FC Frankfurt. The new club took over Viktoria in the Brandenburg-Liga and was aiming for promotion to the higher leagues. Their first success was winning the league in 2015, earning promotion to the NOFV-Oberliga for the first time in 12 years.

== Nomenclature ==
FC Vorwärts Berlin and its forerunners in Berlin were not related to the historical football club Berliner FC Vorwärts 1890. The name "Vorwärts" was in common use in East Germany for teams associated with security organs, notably the East German army.

The "E.V." in the present club name stands for the names of the two predecessors "Eintracht" and "Viktoria" respectively.

== Forms and names ==
The logo of ASK Vorwärts Berlin

Date	Full name	Short name
2 August 1951	Sportvereinigung Volkspolizei Vorwärts Leipzig	SV VP Vorwärts Leipzig
27 April 1952	Sportvereinigung Vorwärts der Hauptverwaltung Ausbildung Leipzig	SV Vorwärts der HVA Leipzig
2 November 1952	Sportvereinigung Vorwärts der Kasernierten Volkspolizei Leipzig	SV Vorwärts der KVP Leipzig
3 April 1953	Sportvereinigung Vorwärts der Kasernierten Volkspolizei Berlin	SV Vorwärts der KVP Berlin
27 September 1953	Zentraler Sportklub Vorwärts der Kasernierten Volkspolizei Berlin	ZSK Vorwärts der KVP Berlin
7 March 1954	Zentraler Sportklub Vorwärts Berlin	ZSK Vorwärts Berlin
31 October 1956	Zentraler Armeesportklub Vorwärts Berlin	ZASK Vorwärts Berlin
1 February 1957	Armeesportklub Vorwärts Berlin	ASK Vorwärts Berlin
18 January 1966	Fußballclub Vorwärts Berlin	FC Vorwärts Berlin
14 August 1971	FC Vorwärts Frankfurt (Oder)	FC Vorwärts Frankfurt
7 February 1991	FC Victoria 91 Frankfurt (Oder) e.V.	FC Victoria 91
29 August 1992	Frankfurter FC Viktoria 91 e.V.	FFC Viktoria 91
1 July 2012	1. FC Frankfurt (Oder) E. V. e.V.	1. FC Frankfurt

== Honours ==
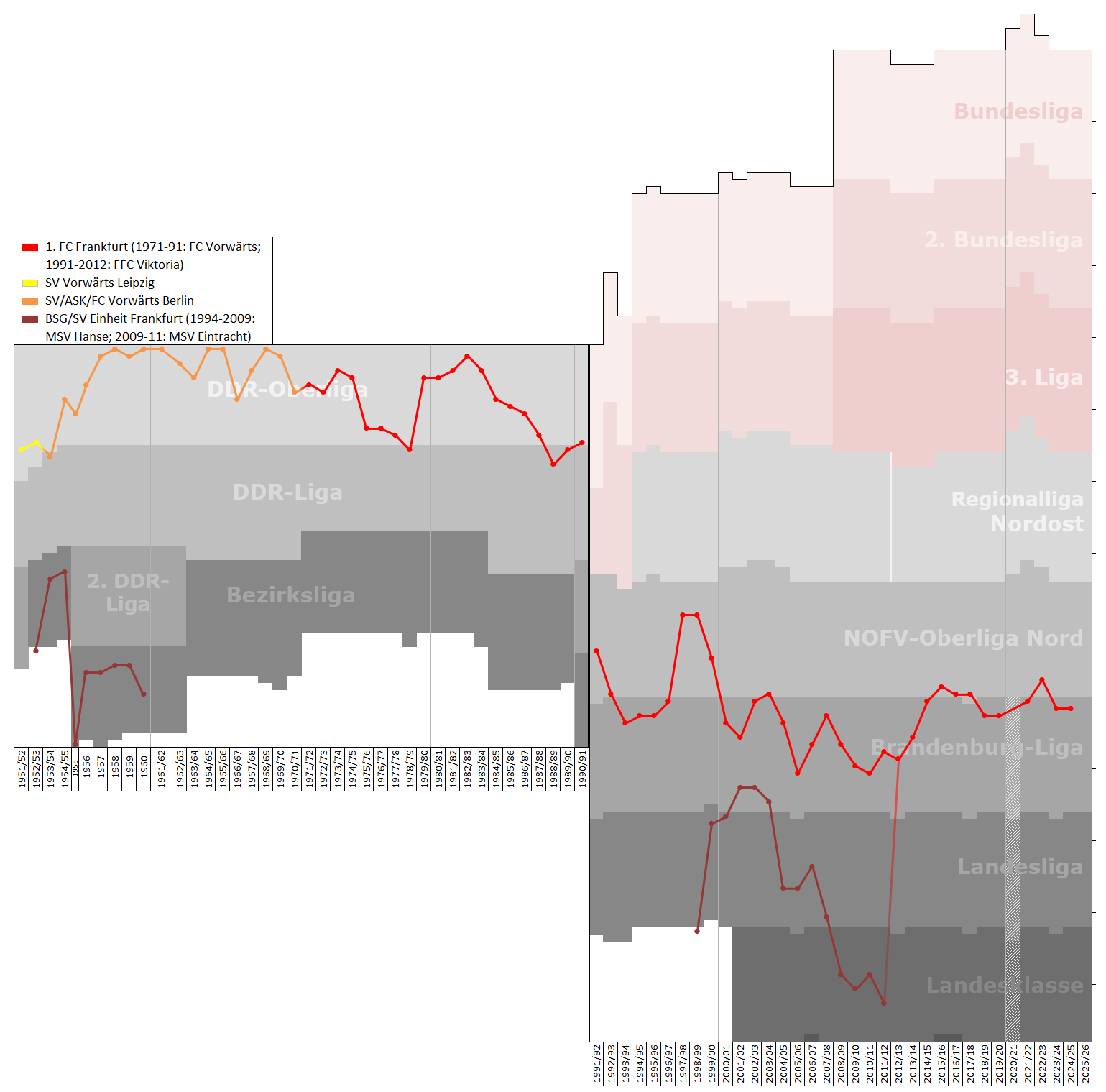
Historical chart of 1. FC Frankfurt league performance

=== Domestic ===
- East German Champions
  - Winners: 1958, 1960, 1961–62, 1964–65, 1965–66, 1968–69
  - Runners-up: 1957, 1959, 1969–70, 1982–83
- FDGB-Pokal
  - Winners: 1952–54, 1969–70
  - Runners-up: 1956, 1975–76, 1980–81
- DDR-Liga (II)
  - Winners: 1953–54, 1978–79, 1989–90

=== International ===
- European Cup
  - Quarter-finals: 1969–70
- European Cup Winners' Cup
  - Quarter-finals: 1970–71

=== Regional ===
- Brandenburg-Liga (VI)
  - Winners: 1997, 2003, 2015, 2022
  - Runners-up: 1996, 2021

== European competitions ==
Season	Competition	Round	Country	Club	Home	Away	Aggregate
1959–60	European Cup	First round	(England)	Wolverhampton Wanderers	2–1	0–2	2–3
1960–61	European Cup Winners' Cup	First round	(Czechoslovakia)	Rudá Hvězda Brno	2–1	0–2	2–3
1961–62	European Cup	Preliminary round	(Northern Ireland)	Linfield	3–0	— (Note: The second leg was scratched and Vorwärts Berlin were advanced to the first round as Linfield were unable to arrange an alternate venue after UK immigration officials refused to issue the Vorwärts team visas to enter the country.)	3–0
1961–62	European Cup	First round	(Scotland)	Rangers	1–2	1–4	2–6
1962–63	European Cup	Preliminary round	(Czechoslovakia)	Dukla Prague	0–3	0–1	0–4
1966–67	European Cup	Preliminary round	(Republic of Ireland)	Waterford	6–1	6–0	12–1
1966–67	European Cup	First round	(Poland)	Górnik Zabrze	2–1	1–2	1–3 (replay)
1970–71	European Cup Winners' Cup	First round	(Italy)	Bologna	0–0	1–1	1–1 (a)
1970–71	European Cup Winners' Cup	Second round	(Portugal)	Benfica	2–0	0–2	2–2 (5–3 p)
1970–71	European Cup Winners' Cup	Quarter Finals	(Netherlands)	PSV	1–0	0–2	1–2
1974–75	UEFA Cup	First round	(Italy)	Juventus	2–1	0–3	2–4
1980–81	UEFA Cup	First round	(Northern Ireland)	Ballymena United	3–0	1–2	4–2
1980–81	UEFA Cup	Second round	(West Germany)	VfB Stuttgart	1–2	1–5	2–7
1982–83	UEFA Cup	First round	(West Germany)	Werder Bremen	1–3	2–0	3–3 (a)
1983–84	UEFA Cup	First round	(England)	Nottingham Forest	0–1	0–2	0–3
1984–85	UEFA Cup	First round	(Netherlands)	PSV	2–0	0–3	2–3

== See also ==
- Berlin derby
