= Weissenfelser HV 91 =

German handball club

Weissenfelser Handballverein '91 e.V. (a.k.a. WHV '91) is a German women's handball club from Weissenfels. It was founded in 1991, following the reunification of Germany, from the fusion of local clubs BSG Fortschritt Weißenfels and ASG Vorwärts Weißenfels, and it currently plays in the Saxony-Anhalt regional category.

SC Fortschritt Weißenfels, from 1961 named BSG Fortschritt Weißenfels, was one of the leading teams in the early stages in the DDR-Oberliga winning six championships between 1955 and 1964. In 1963 it became the first team to represent East Germany in the European Cup, reaching the competition's semifinals.

== Titles ==
- East German Championship
  - 1955, 1958, 1959, 1962, 1963, 1964
