= East German football league system =

- Country: East Germany
- Sport: Association football
- Promotion and relegation: Yes

National system
- Federation: East German Football Association
- Confederation: UEFA
- Top division: DDR-Oberliga
- Second division: DDR-Liga
- Cup competition: FDGB-Pokal

The East German football league system existed from 1949 until shortly after German reunification in 1991.

== Structure ==
For most of its history, competitive football of East Germany (GDR) was divided into three tiers. The DDR-Oberliga was founded in 1949, and served as GDR football's highest tier of competition throughout the country's existence.

The DDR-Liga was founded in 1950 as the GDR's second tier of competitive football. Between 1950 and 1954, Liga clubs were divided into geographical sub-divisions. In 1955, the Liga switched to a single division format, before reverting to geography-based sub-divisions in 1962.

Between 1952 and 1954, and from 1963 until 1990, the third tier of GDR competitive football consisted of several district leagues known as Bezirksliga. The boundaries of these Bezirksligen corresponded to each of the GDR's administrative divisions, with clubs assigned according to their location. In 1955, a single division known as the II. Liga was introduced, supplanting the various Bezirksligen as the GDR's third tier of competitive football and transforming the latter into fourth tier competitions. However, in 1963 the II. Liga was abolished, and the Bezirksligen were restored to third tier status.

In order to facilitate re-integration into a unified German league system, a one-off reorganisation of East German leagues was implemented for the 1990–91 season. This reorganisation saw the Bezirksligen once again relegated to fourth tier status, with the third tier consisted of four new divisions corresponding to the regions of Brandenburg, Saxony, Saxony-Anhalt, and Thuringia.

Below the Bezirksliga level, several county competitions known as the Bezirksklasse, Kreisliga and Kreisklasse took place.

=== Timeline ===
Source: "East German football leagues" (in German). Das deutsche Fussball Archiv.

== Governance ==
Between 1949 and 1957, the East German Sports Committee (Deutscher Sportausschuß; DS) was officially responsible for administering the country's various leagues via its Football Section (SF). In addition to securing the GDR membership in football's international governing body FIFA, the SF was a co-founder of European football's foremost administrative body, UEFA. Both achievements would pave the way for the participation of East German clubs in international competition from the mid-1950s onwards.

From 1957, the East German Gymnastics and Sports Confederation (Deutscher Turn- und Sportbund; DTSB) assumed the DS's responsibilities over sport, later forming the East German Football Association (DFV) in 1958 to replace the SF.

=== Political interventions ===
Despite the official power accorded to the SF and later the DFV, both bodies lacked total autonomy over major administrative decisions, which were often influenced by the political interventions of state and regional interests.

==== Club restructuring ====
The SF forcibly merged or relocated several clubs and teams in the DDR-Oberliga in 1954. Officially, the decision was aimed at concentrating the best players in certain locations, with the intention of improving the general quality of East German football. However, the move was derided by fans as serving the interests of powerful political interests.

BSG Chemie Leipzig, the champions of the 1950-51 season, was dismembered in September 1954. Almost all of its players were assigned to the new sports club SC Lokomotive Leipzig. The rump BSG Chemie Leipzig was relegated to the Bezirksliga and renamed BSG Chemie-Leipzig West. The successful team of BSG Empor Lauter was relocated to Rostock in October 1954. The team and its place in the DDR-Oberliga was transferred to the new sports club SC Empor Rostock, which later became FC Hansa Rostock. Then SED First Secretary in Bezirk Rostock Karl Mewis and SED functionary Harry Tisch were instrumental in the relocation of BSG Empor Lauter to Rostock. The football team of Dynamo Dresden, the champions in the 1952-53 season, was relocated to East Berlin in November 1954. The team and its place in the DDR-Oberliga were transferred to the new sports club SC Dynamo Berlin, which later became BFC Dynamo. Political factors and pressure from Erich Mielke were probably the main reasons behind the relocation of Dynamo Dresden to East Berlin. The relocation was designed to provide the capital with a competitive team that could rival Hertha BSC, Blau-Weiß 1890 Berlin and Tennis Borussia Berlin, which were still popular in East Berlin and drew football fans to West Berlin. Relocations became more rare after the 1950s, but would continue to take place throughout the history of East Germany. Another notable example was the relocation of FC Vorwärts Berlin to Frankfurt an der Oder in 1971.

==== League calendar ====
In 1955, the SF switched its league competitions from the traditional autumn-to-spring season running between August and May, to a calendar-year season running from February to November. This decision was influenced by the desire of GDR political leaders to align the country's institutions with those of the Soviet Union, which employed the calendar-year system in order to avoid playing games in cold and snowy winter weather.

However, the decision made less practical sense in the more temperate GDR. Match attendances suffered during the traditional vacation months of July and August, and GDR clubs - often midway through their domestic seasons - found themselves at a physical disadvantage in UEFA competitions against fresh European sides coming off their summer breaks.

The DFV would revert to the old August-to-May system from the 1960–61 season onwards.

==== Club prioritisation ====
The DFV implemented two major reforms in 1965 and 1970 that favoured the GDR's larger clubs.

In 1965, select clubs were formally granted status as football clubs (FC). The football clubs were allowed to establish player development programmes and schools within their designated catchment areas. The move essentially granted them a monopoly over up-and-coming youth prospects, contributing to an ever-increasing gulf in quality between the FCs and ordinary factory clubs (BSGs).

In 1970, the DFV presided over de facto professionalisation. Players in FCs were allowed to train full-time, and were granted access to material privileges such as interest-free loans, cars, or apartments. By contrast, BSG players were expected to complete their day-shifts, and continued to be paid solely for their day-jobs.

==== Transfers ====
Officially, player transfers for money did not exist in the GDR. However, the DFV could 'delegate' a player from one club to another upon the player's request.

Such delegations were frequently subject to political complexities. In 1981, Sachsenring Zwickau player Hans-Uwe Pilz requested a transfer to Dynamo Dresden. Despite the DFV's approval, resistance from Zwickau officials scuttled the move. In 1982, the DFV approved a second request by Pilz to move to Dresden, only to find that regional DTSB officials from Karl-Marx-Stadt had signed off on papers delegating Pilz to their city's own club: FC Karl-Marx-Stadt. The resulting fracas was only settled after intervention from national DTSB chief Manfred Ewald and Socialist Unity Party (SED) Central Committee member Rudolf Hellmann.

Such horsetrading between competing party, city, and club officials for players was commonplace. Although player income was officially restricted to what they earned from their day-jobs, officials offered a variety of under-the-table incentives to lure players away, ranging from apartments, cars, food, or laxer work regimens.

== Clubs ==
=== Affiliations ===
Football clubs in the East Germany could be classified into four categories:

==== Enterprise sports communities (BSG) ====
The enterprise sports communities (German: Betriebssportgemeinschaften; BSG) were sport communities attached to state-owned enterprises. The enterprise sports communities were the basis of sports in East Germany, and were the most common type of football team. However, they received the least support from state authorities, and were often subject to arbitrary interventions. Players were generally enterprise employees. Due to the varying economic output of different industries, the enterprise sports communities varied greatly in financial resources and sporting success, with the "Wismut" and "Chemie" communities proving particular successful. The enterprise sports communities can be subdivided into the following:

- Aktivist: Mining industry: BSG Aktivist Brieske-Senftenberg
- Aufbau: Building industry: BSG Aufbau Krumhermersdorf
- Chemie: Chemical industry: BSG Chemie Halle, BSG Chemie Leuna, BSG Chemie Leipzig, BSG Chemie Kahla, BSG Chemie Zeitz
- Einheit: Civil administration: BSG Einheit Pankow
- Empor: Trade & Commerce: BSG Empor Neuruppin, BSG Empor Halle
- Energie: Energy providers: BSG Energie Cottbus
- Fortschritt: Textile industry: BSG Fortschritt Bischofswerda
- Lokomotive: State railway (the Deutsche Reichsbahn): BSG Lokomotive Stendal, BSG Lokomotive Halberstadt
- Motor: Automotive industry: BSG Motor Babelsberg, BSG Motor Karl Marx Stadt
- Post: Postal service: BSG Post Neubrandenburg
- Rotation: Print industry: BSG Rotation Babelsberg
- Stahl: Steel industry: BSG Stahl Riesa, BSG Stahl Brandenburg, BSG Stahl Eisenhüttenstadt, BSG Stahl Altenburg, BSG Stahl Hennigsdorf, BSG Stahl Thale
- Traktor: Agriculture: BSG Traktor Groß Lindow
- Turbine: Energy providers: BSG Turbine Halle, BSG Turbine Potsdam, BSG Turbine Markranstädt
- Wismut: Mining industry, specifically uranium mining: BSG Wismut Aue, BSG Wismut Plauen

Some industrial branches were particularly unsuccessful due to low funding. One example were the agricultural enterprises, which failed to have a club in the DDR-Oberliga or DDR-Liga after 1978, when BSG Traktor Groß Lindow were relegated from the DDR-Liga. Some sports communities were enterprise sports communities in practice, but carried the names of their particular enterprise, one example being BSG Sachsenring Zwickau.

==== SV Dynamo ====
The clubs of the ministry of the interior with strong connection to the police and the secret police. The clubs were part of sports association SV Dynamo.

Examples:

- BFC Dynamo (until January 1966 SC Dynamo Berlin)
- SG Dynamo Dresden
- SG Dynamo Fürstenwalde
- SG Dynamo Hohenschönhausen
- SG Dynamo Rostock-Mitte
- SG Dynamo Schwerin

==== ASV Vorwärts ====
The clubs of the ministry of defence. The clubs were part of sports association ASV Vorwärts.

Examples:

- FC Vorwärts Frankfurt (known as FC Vorwärts Berlin until summer 1971)
- ASG Vorwärts Cottbus
- ASG Vorwärts Dessau
- ASG Vorwärts Stralsund
- ASG Vorwärts Kamenz

==== Football clubs (FC) ====
Established after the 1965 DFV reform, these were:

- 1. FC Magdeburg, continued to receive support from state-owned combine VEB Schwermaschinenbau-Kombinat Ernst Thälmann (SKET)
- F.C. Hansa Rostock, supported by the state-owned combine VEB Kombinat Seeverkehr und Hafenwirtschaft
- FC Rot-Weiß Erfurt
- FC Carl Zeiss Jena, continued to be closely supported by the Carl Zeiss AG optics factories
- FC Karl Marx Stadt
- 1. FC Lokomotive Leipzig, supported by the Deutsche Reichsbahn
- 1. FC Union Berlin, initially supported by the FDGB. Officially sponsored by state-owned combine VVB Hochspannungsgeräte und Kabel, which implemented its support through several local-state owned enterprises, such as VEB Kabelwerk Oberspree (KWO).
- Hallescher FC Chemie, despite its name, the club was not affiliated with the chemical industry

Most sports associations (German: Sportverinigung; SV) were dissolved at the founding of the DTSB in 1957. However, the sports associations SV Dynamo and ASV Vorwärts continued to exist as districts organizations within the DTSB and were allowed to retain their own statutes. BFC Dynamo and FC Vorwärts Berlin also became designated football clubs (FC), but would largely remain under the influence of their ministries. SG Dynamo Dresden would also be granted the same privileges in regards of the recruitment of players in 1968, but did not become a designated football club.

=== Fan culture ===
==== Club rivalries ====
Club rivalries developed along several lines. The most common rivalries were those between intra-city or intra-enterprise rivals, and could be found at every tier of GDR football.

More unique were rivalries that formed out of anti-establishment sentiment, with BFC Dynamo proving the foremost target of such feeling. Within Berlin, BFC Dynamo elicited the contempt of the firmly working-class 1. FC Union Berlin. A similar relationship existed between 1. FC Lokomotive Leipzig and BSG Chemie Leipzig in Leipzig. Outside Berlin, supporters of BFC Dynamo found themselves scorned by supporters of Dynamo Dresden. In addition to the transfer of the first team of SG Dynamo Dresden to SC Dynamo Berlin in 1954, supporters of SG Dynamo Dresden accused BFC Dynamo of benefitting from its status as the favourite club of Erich Mielke, despite itself being supported by the Stasi.

Upon the establishment of Football Clubs (FCs) in 1965, another form of rivalry emerged between players and fans of the FCs and BSGs. Those associated with the BSGs frequently took pride in their status as "real" workers teams, and poured scorn on the 'elitist' FCs that benefited from increasing de facto professionalisation of the sport throughout the 1970s.

==== Fan clubs ====
Unofficial fan clubs revolving around the various football clubs in East Germany were widespread. They were often viewed with suspicion by the authorities, owing to their spontaneous and independent nature. While their express purpose was to organise fan events and produce club-related materials, they were frequently scapegoated for football-related disorder. Stasi figures showed that BFC Dynamo had six registered fan clubs and 22 unauthorized fan clubs in 1986.

The state's accusations of fan club-derived hooliganism steadily gained legitimacy come the 1980s. Infiltration by skinheads, especially amongst the Berlin clubs, saw a shift towards more a more militant culture and a spate of violent incidents.

The DFV attempted to clamp down on fan incidents by offering fan clubs the opportunity to register as official associations. While some fan club members were attracted by the incentive of privileged access to players and match tickets and subsidized travel, others were contemptuous of the very notion of bureaucratic incorporation and the loss of autonomy and spontaneity.

== Sources ==
- "Kicker Almanach" The Football Yearbook on German football from Bundesliga to Oberliga, since 1937, published by the Kicker Sports Magazine
