= FSV Glückauf Brieske-Senftenberg =

German football club

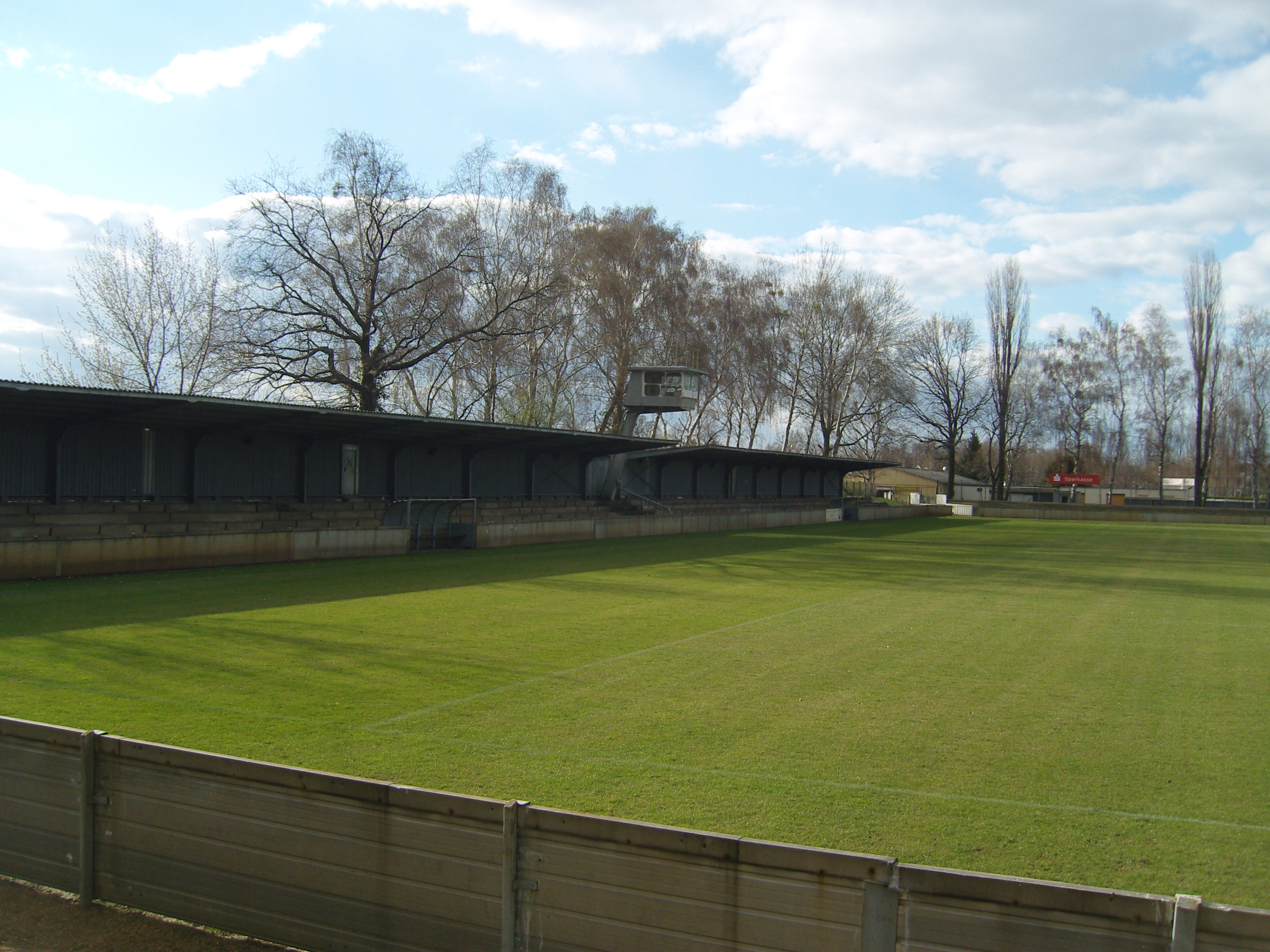
- Full name: Fußballsportverein Glückauf Brieske-Senftenberg e.V.
- Founded: 19 January 1919
- Ground: Elsterkampfbahn
- Capacity: 6,000
- Chairman: Herbert Tänzer
- Trainer: Heiko Gajewski
- League: Landesliga Brandenburg-Süd (VII)
- 2015–16: 3rd

FSV Glückauf Brieske-Senftenberg is a German football club from Senftenberg in Brandenburg, currently playing in the Landesliga Brandenburg-Süd (VII).

== History ==
FSV Glückauf Brieske-Senftenberg was founded on 19 January 1919 as Fußballverein Grube Marga before becoming Fußballsportverein Grube Marga in 1928. The club was renamed Sportverein Sturm Grube Marga in 1933 and played two seasons (1941–43) in the Gauliga Berlin-Brandenburg, one of the country's 16 top-flight regional divisions.

After World War II, the club was closed before being reformed as Sportgemeinde Grube Marga and becoming part of the separate football competition that emerged in East Germany under Soviet occupation. In 1948, it was renamed BSG Franz Mehring Grube in recognition of leftist politician, journalist and writer Franz Mehring. Two years later the club was known as BSG Aktivist Ost Brieske and became part of the DDR-Oberliga (I).

On 4 November 1953, the newly built Glück-Auf Stadium was opened with a friendly match against Torpedo Moscow in front of 35,000 spectators. The best-known player of this time was Horst Franke, who played an international match for the East German team in 1953/54. It is not known how long the team played at the Glück-Auf Stadium for. In October 1954, the football section was delegated to the newly founded SC Aktivist Brieske-Senftenberg. The team then played as SC Aktivist Brieske-Senftenberg between 1954 and 1963, earning their best result in 1958 when they finished third.

They were relegated after a 14th-place result in 1963 and the club was broken up. The footballers were delegated to establish Sportclub Cottbus, whose football side became independent as BSG Energie Cottbus in 1966 and was the predecessor of FC Energie Cottbus.

The reserve team of SC Aktivist merged with BSG Aktivist Brieske-Ost to form BSG Aktivist Senftenberg in February 1972 and went on to play in the DDR-Liga (II). After German reunification in 1990, the club was renamed FSV Glückauf Brieske-Senftenberg and became one of the founding members of the NOFV-Oberliga Mitte (III) in the combined German football competition. After the dissolution of the NOFV-Oberliga Mitte, Brieske qualified for the NOFV-Oberliga Süd in 1994. It was relegated from third-tier competition after finishing 15th in the 1995–96 season.

Since then the club has played in the Brandenburg-Liga and the Landesliga below that. It has played in the Landesliga since it was once again relegated in 2011.

== Honours ==
The club's honours:

- Landesliga Brandenburg-Süd
  - Champions: 2009
  - Runners-up: 2014
