= 1949 Ostzonenmeisterschaft final =

1949 Ostzonenmeisterschaft Final
Soviet occupation zone championship
- Event: 1949 Ostzonenmeisterschaft
Union Halle	Fortuna Erfurt
4	1
- Date: 26 June 1949
- Venue: Stadion im Ostragehege, Dresden
- Referee: Gerhard Schulz (Dresden)
- Attendance: 50,000

The 1949 Ostzonenmeisterschaft Final decided the winner of the 1949 Ostzonenmeisterschaft, the 2nd edition of the Ostzonenmeisterschaft, a knockout football cup competition to decide the champions of the Soviet occupation zone.

The match was played on 26 June 1949 at the Stadion im Ostragehege in Dresden. Union Halle won the match 4–1 against Fortuna Erfurt for their 1st title.

== Route to the final ==
The Ostzonenmeisterschaft was a ten team single-elimination knockout cup competition. There were a total of three rounds leading up to the final. Four teams entered the qualifying round, with the two winners advancing to the quarter-finals, where they were joined by six additional clubs who were given a bye. For all matches, the winner after 90 minutes advances. If still tied, extra time was used to determine the winner.

Union Halle		Round	Fortuna Erfurt
Opponent	Result	1949 Ostzonenmeisterschaft	Opponent	Result
SG Dresden-Friedrichstadt	2–1	Quarter-finals	SG Wismar-Süd	10–0
Eintracht Stendal	3–0	Semi-finals	SG Meerane	4–3 (a.e.t.)

== Match ==
=== Details ===
26 June 1949

Union Halle	4–1	Fortuna Erfurt
Rappsilber 13', 71'; Theile 48'; Werkmeister 64'	Report	Schmidt 77'

Stadion im Ostragehege, Dresden
Attendance: 50,000
Referee: Gerhard Schulz (Dresden)

Union Halle	Fortuna Erfurt

GK	1	(Soviet occupation zone) Horst Schmidt
RB		(Soviet occupation zone) Fritz Belger
LB		(Soviet occupation zone) Erich Lehmann
RH		(Soviet occupation zone) Kurt Fritzsche
CH		(Soviet occupation zone) Otto Knefler
LH		(Soviet occupation zone) Erich Blanke
OR		(Soviet occupation zone) Rolf Theile
IR		(Soviet occupation zone) Otto Werkmeister
CF		(Soviet occupation zone) Herbert Rappsilber
IL		(Soviet occupation zone) Horst Blüher
OL		(Soviet occupation zone) Karl Gola

GK	1	(Soviet occupation zone) Heinz Grünbeck
RB		(Soviet occupation zone) Horst Müller
LB		(Soviet occupation zone) Siegfried Vollrath
RH		(Soviet occupation zone) Werner Brock
CH		(Soviet occupation zone) Helmut Nordhaus
LH		(Soviet occupation zone) Jochen Müller
OR		(Soviet occupation zone) Herbert Löbe
IR		(Soviet occupation zone) Willy Dittmar
CF		(Soviet occupation zone) Fritz Schmidt
IL		(Soviet occupation zone) Winfried Herz
OL		(Soviet occupation zone) Kurt Thein
