= 1948 Ostzonenmeisterschaft final =

1948 Ostzonenmeisterschaft Final
Soviet occupation zone championship
- Event: 1948 Ostzonenmeisterschaft
SG Planitz	Freiimfelde Halle
1	0
- Date: 4 July 1948
- Venue: Probstheidaer Stadion, Leipzig
- Referee: Kurt Liebschner (Weißenfels)
- Attendance: 40,000

The 1948 Ostzonenmeisterschaft Final decided the winner of the 1948 Ostzonenmeisterschaft, the 1st edition of the Ostzonenmeisterschaft, a knockout football cup competition to decide the champions of the Soviet occupation zone.

The match was played on 4 July 1948 at the Probstheidaer Stadion in Leipzig. SG Planitz won the match 1–0 against Freiimfelde Halle for their 1st title.

== Route to the final ==
The Ostzonenmeisterschaft was a ten team single-elimination knockout cup competition. There were a total of three rounds leading up to the final. Four teams entered the qualifying round, with the two winners advancing to the quarter-finals, where they were joined by six additional clubs who were given a bye. For all matches, the winner after 90 minutes advances. If still tied, extra time was used to determine the winner.

SG Planitz		Round	Freiimfelde Halle
Opponent	Result	1948 Ostzonenmeisterschaft	Opponent	Result
SG Schwerin	3–1	Quarter-finals	SG Wismar-Süd	3–1
SG Weimar-Ost	5–0	Semi-finals	SG Meerane	5–2

== Match ==
=== Details ===
4 July 1948

SG Planitz	1–0	Freiimfelde Halle
Weiß 38'	Report

Probstheidaer Stadion, Leipzig
Attendance: 40,000
Referee: Kurt Liebschner (Weißenfels)

SG Planitz	Freiimfelde Halle

GK	1	(Soviet occupation zone) Anton Huber
RB		(Soviet occupation zone) Erich Merkel
LB		(Soviet occupation zone) Egon Jugel
RH		(Soviet occupation zone) Günter Schneider
CH		(Soviet occupation zone) Herbert Seltmann
LH		(Soviet occupation zone) Erich Meichsner
OR		(Soviet occupation zone) Hans Meier
IR		(Soviet occupation zone) Johannes Breitenstein
CF		(Soviet occupation zone) Horst Weiß
IL		(Soviet occupation zone) Karl Dittes
OL		(Soviet occupation zone) Helmut Fischer

GK	1	(Soviet occupation zone) Kurt Grimm
RB		(Soviet occupation zone) Fritz Belger
LB		(Soviet occupation zone) Hans Meyer
RH		(Soviet occupation zone) Walter Metzner
CH		(Soviet occupation zone) Karl-Heinz Scheer
LH		(Soviet occupation zone) Kurt Fritzsche
OR		(Soviet occupation zone) Manfred Krüger
IR		(Soviet occupation zone) Heinz Pabst
CF		(Soviet occupation zone) Paul Brandt
IL		(Soviet occupation zone) Horst Blüher
OL		(Soviet occupation zone) Karl Gola
