= 1950–51 DDR-Oberliga championship play-off =

1950–51 DDR-Oberliga Championship play-off
- Match programme cover
- Event: 1950–51 DDR-Oberliga
Turbine Erfurt	Chemie Leipzig
0	2
- Date: 20 May 1951
- Venue: Ernst-Thälmann-Stadion, Chemnitz
- Referee: Kurt Liebschner (Weißenfels)
- Attendance: 60,000

The championship play-off of the 1950–51 DDR-Oberliga took place on 20 May 1951 at the Ernst-Thälmann-Stadion in Chemnitz between Chemie Leipzig and Turbine Erfurt. The match decided the winner of the 1950–51 DDR-Oberliga, the 2nd season of the DDR-Oberliga, the top-level football league in East Germany. The match was necessary as both teams finished the season level on points. At the time, the rules stated that if this were to occur, a playoff would be necessary to decide the national champion. With a 2–0 victory, Chemie Leipzig secured the championship for their 1st national title.

== Background ==
The final phase of the championship for a long time was a three-way battle between Motor Zwickau, Chemie Leipzig, and Turbine Erfurt. However, as Zwickau lost both games against these direct opponents, they ended up finishing third. Two matchdays before the end of the season saw Leipzig leading Erfurt by a point. But on the final day they lost their table lead after a 2–3 defeat against Rotation Babelsberg. At the same time, Erfurt won 2–0 against Zwickau, meaning Chemie Leipzig and Turbine Erfurt were level on points at the top of the table.

== Match ==
=== Summary ===
While Chemie Leipzig were able to compete with their starting players, Turbine Erfurt were without defender Helmut Nordhaus and center-forward Wolfgang Nitsche, two important players. Both were suspended due to being disciplined in the international match between East Germany and Poland. Erfurt had another loss to cope with, as twelve minutes into the game, striker Heinz Hammer had to be substituted out due to an injury. Prior to that, Leipzig's attacker Georg Zenker had proven the dangerousness of his team with a good opportunity. At first the game was open, and Erfurt had an opportunity to take the lead in the 25th minute. However, Heinz Wozniakowski's free kick hit the post. Erfurt were thankful for the weak performance of the left attack side of Leipzig of Heinz Fröhlich and Rolf Grupe, and the absence of Nordhaus remained unnoticed for the time being.

The second half began with a strong offensive by Turbine Erfurt. In this period, the defence organized by Werner Eilitz of Leipzig proved its class. Leipzig had already conceded the fewest goals in the past Oberliga season, and now also stood up to the test of Erfurt. In the 52nd minute Erfurt scored what should have been a goal, but was falsely disallowed by referee Liebschner because of alleged offside player. In the middle of Erfurt's strong period, Chemie countered with surprising play. Rudolf Krause got past two Erfurt players and slotted the ball to Gerhard Helbig, who took the ball and scored past the Erfurt keeper for a 1–0 lead. Five minutes later, both players again found themselves combining. This time, Krause scored Leipzig's second goal with a 16-meter-long shot. Although Erfurt's best player, Jochen Müller, continued his efforts, Erfurt could no longer turn the result, and the match finished as a 2–0 win for Chemie.

=== Details ===
20 May 1951

Turbine Erfurt	0–2	Chemie Leipzig
	Report	Helbig 65'; Krause 70'

Ernst-Thälmann-Stadion, Chemnitz
Attendance: 60,000
Referee: Kurt Liebschner (Weißenfels)

Turbine Erfurt	Chemie Leipzig

GK	1	(East Germany) Heinz Senftleben
RB		(East Germany) Wilhelm Hoffmeyer
LB		(East Germany) Hans Machts
RH		(East Germany) Karl-Heinz Löffler
CH		(East Germany) Hans Birke
LH		(East Germany) Jochen Müller
OR		(East Germany) Eduard Francke
IR		(East Germany) Heinz Hammer	(substituted off) 12'
CF		(East Germany) Heinz Wozniakowski
IL		(East Germany) Winfried Herz
OL		(East Germany) Helmut Lipper
Substitute:
FW		(East Germany) Erich Martin		(substituted in) 12'
Manager:
(East Germany) Fischer

GK	1	(East Germany) Günter Busch
RB		(East Germany) Werner Brembach
LB		(East Germany) Walter Rose
RH		(East Germany) Horst Scherbaum
CH		(East Germany) Werner Eilitz
LH		(East Germany) Gerhard Polland
OR		(East Germany) Gerhard Helbig
IR		(East Germany) Rudolf Krause
CF		(East Germany) Georg Zenker
IL		(East Germany) Heinz Fröhlich
OL		(East Germany) Rolf Grupe
Manager:
(East Germany) Rolf Kukowitsch
