= List of football clubs in East Germany =

The history of East German football is complex, and that of its clubs particularly so. After World War II, the occupying Allies disbanded most German organisations, including sports clubs.

While some clubs were re-formed, others were not, and many that emerged had been renamed, merged with their neighbours, or even split. The instability continued throughout the East German era, with clubs being moved to new towns, and with very frequent name-changes, Soviet-sounding names like Dynamo and Lokomotive replacing more traditional names.

After re-unification, many clubs reverted to their pre-East German names, but some stuck with them, and others have changed back again. This page lists all prominent East German clubs, along with their original name, their present-day name, and a list of name changes and mergers that they underwent.

GDR name	Pre-GDR name	Current name	Other names	GDR Titles	GDR Cups
BSG Wismut Aue	Pneumatik Aue	FC Erzgebirge Aue	BSG Pneumatik Aue (1946–49); BSG Zentra Wismut Aue (1949–51); SC Wismut Karl-Marx-Stadt (1954–63); FC Wismut Aue (1990–93)	3	1
BSG Rotation Babelsberg	SG Babelsberg	Fortuna Babelsberg	SG Babelsberg (1946–49); BSG Märkische Volksstimme Potsdam-Babelsberg (1949–50); BSG DEFA Babelsberg (1969–90)	-	-
Berliner FC Dynamo°	None (formed 1966)	Berliner FC Dynamo	SC Dynamo Berlin (1954–66) (Note: BFC Dynamo originally began as a football department of SC Dynamo Berlin. The team of SC Dynamo Berlin was formed in 1954, when the team of SG Dynamo Dresden and its place the DDR-Oberliga was relocated to East Berlin.); FC Berlin (1990–99)	10	3
1. FC Union Berlin°	SC Union Oberschöneweide	1. FC Union Berlin	FC Olympia Oberschöneweide (1906–1906); BTuFC Helgoland (1906-07); BTuFC Union 1892 (1907-09); SC Union Oberschöneweide (1909-45); SG Oberschöneweide (1945–48); SG Union Oberschöneweide (1948–51); BSG Motor Oberschöneweide (1951–55); SC Motor Berlin (1955–57); TSC Oberschöneweide (1957–63); TSC Berlin (1963–66)	-	1
BSG Chemie Böhlen	None (founded 1969)	SV Chemie Böhlen	BSG Brennstoff Böhlen (1949–52); BSG Benzinwerk Böhlen (1949–52); BSG Aktivist Böhlen (1952–68); SV Chemie Böhlen (1990)	-	-
FC Vorwärts Berlin° FC Vorwärts Frankfurt/Oder° (Note: FC Vorwärts Berlin were relocated to Frankfurt an der Oder on 31 July 1971 and continued as FC Vorwärts Frankfurt/Oder.)	None (founded 1951)	1. FC Frankfurt	SV VP Vorwärts Leipzig (1951–53); SV Vorwärts der HVA Leipzig (1952-52); SV Vorwärts der KVP Leipzig (1952-53); SV Vorwärts der KVP Berlin (1953-53); ZSK Vorwärts der KVP Berlin (1953-54); ZSK Vorwärts Berlin (1954–56); ZASK Vorwärts Berlin (1956-57); ASK Vorwärts Berlin (1957–66) (Note: FC Vorwärts Berlin originally began as a football department of ASK Vorwärts Berlin.); FC Victoria 91 Frankfurt (1991–92); FFC Viktoria 91 (1992–2012) (Note: FFC Viktoria 91 and MSV Eintracht Frankfurt merged in 2012 to become 1. FC Frankfurt.)	6	2
BSG Stahl Brandenburg	None (founded 1950)	FC Stahl Brandenburg	BSV Stahl Brandenburg (1990–93); BSV Brandenburg (1993–98)	-	-
BSG Energie Cottbus	None (founded 1963)	FC Energie Cottbus	BSG Aktivist Brieske-Ost (1950–54); SC Aktivist Brieske-Senftenberg (1954–63); SC Cottbus (1963–66)	-	-
BSG Motor Dessau	SV Dessau 05	SV Dessau 05	FC Adler (1905); Dessauer FC (1905–1919); SV BAMAG Dessau (?–1919); VfR Dessau (1919–21); SpVgg Dessau (?–1921); Blau-Weiss Dessau (1945–47); Sport-Union Dessau (1947–48); SG Dessau-Nord (1948–49); BSG Waggonbau Dessau (1949); BSG Waggonfabrik Dessau (1949–50); SG Waggonbau 05 Dessau (1990–95)	-	1
SG Dynamo Dresden°°	None (founded 1953)	SG Dynamo Dresden	SG Volkspolizei Dresden (1948–50); SV Deutsche Volkspolizei Dresden (1950-1953) (Note: When SG Friedrichstadt was dissolved after the 1949-50 DDR-Oberliga season, the playing right in the DDR-Oberliga was given to SV Deutsche Volkspolizei Dresden. SV Deutsche Volkspolizei Dresden only played in the lower tier Stadtliga Dresden at the time. The team was thus able to enter the DDR-Oberliga without having to progress through divisions. In order to put together a strong team for SV Deutsche Volkspolizei Dresden to the 1950-51 DDR-Oberliga, the 40 best players of the various Volkspolizei teams in East Germany were brought together for a training session in Forst in July 1950. Coaches Fritz Sack and Paul Döring picked out 17 players from 11 different cities who were delegated to Dresden to form the team. SV Deutsche Volkspolizei Potsdam lost five players. SV Deutsche Volkspolizei Potsdam was severely weakened by the delegations to Dresden. SV Deutsche Volkspolizei Dresden became SG Dynamo Dresden on 12 April 1953.); 1. FC Dynamo Dresden (1990–2007)	8	7
SG Friedrichstadt	Dresdner SC	Dresdner SC	Dresdner SC (1898-1945); None (disbanded 1950–91) (Note: SG Friedrichstadt was the successor to Dresdner SC. SG Friedrichstadt was disbanded by the authorities in 1950. The club was considered too bourgeoisie. Many player, including player-coach Helmut Schön, fled to West Germany. Its place in the DDR-Oberliga was given to SV Deutsche Volkspolizei Dresden, which became SG Dynamo Dresden in 1953. A new Dresdner SC was formed in 1991, after German reunification.)	-	-
BSG Stahl Eisenhüttenstädt	None (founded 1950)	FC Eisenhüttenstädt	BSG Stahl Fürstenberg Ost (1950–53); BSG Stahl Stalinstadt (1953–59); Eisenhüttenstädter FC Stahl (1990–2016)	-	-
FC Rot-Weiß Erfurt°	SG Erfurt West	Rot-Weiss Erfurt	SG Erfurt West (1946–48); SG Fortuna Erfurt (1948–49); KWU Erfurt (1949–50); BSG Turbine Erfurt (1950–54); SC Turbine Erfurt (1954–65)	2	-
BSG Wismut Gera	SG Gera-Pforden	BSG Wismut Gera	1. VfR Gera (?–1922); Allgemeinen Turngemeinde Gera (?–1922); SpVgg Gera 04; Concordia Gera-Reuß (?–1936); SG Gera-Pforden (1945–49); RFT Gera (?–1950); BSG Mechanik Gera (1950–51); BSG Motor Gera (1951–52); FSV Wismut Gera (1990–93); 1. SV Gera (1993–2007); FV Gera Süd (2007–09)	-	-
Hallescher FC Chemie°	SG Freiimfelde Halle	Hallescher FC	SG Freiimfelde Halle (1945–49); ZSG Union Halle (1949–50); BSG Turbine Halle (1950–54); SC Chemie Halle-Leune (1954–58); SC Chemie Halle (1958–66)	2	2
FC Carl Zeiss Jena°	1. SV Jena	FC Carl Zeiss Jena	FC der Firma Carl Zeiss (1903–11); FC Carl Zeiss Jena (1911–17, 1966–); Ernst-Abbe Jena (1946–48); Stadion Jena (1948–49); BSG Carl Zeiss Jena (1949–51); Mechanik Jena (1951); BSG Motor Jena (1951–54); SC Motor Jena (1954–66)	3	4
FC Karl-Marx-Stadt°	None (founded 1945)	Chemnitzer FC	SG Chemnitz Nord (1945–48); BSG Fewa Chemnitz (1948–51); BSG Chemie Chemnitz (1951–53); SC Chemie Karl-Marx-Stadt (1953–56); SC Motor Karl-Marx-Stadt (1956–63); SC Karl-Marx-Stadt (1963–66)	1	-
BSG Chemie Leipzig	TuRa Leipzig	BSG Chemie Leipzig (Note: FC Grün-Weiß Leipzig merged with SV Chemie Böhlen (formerly BSG Chemie Böhlen) in 1990, forming FC Sachsen Leipzig.)	TuRa Leipzig (1938-44); KSG Leipzig (1944-45) (Note: TuRa Leipzig was paired with SpVgg 1899 Leipzig to form the war time side KSG Leipzig.); SG Leipzig-Leutzsch (1945–49); ZSG Industrie Leipzig (1949–50) (Note: ZSG Industrie Leipzig was in fact, the result of a merger of five teams: SG Lindenau-Aue, SG Lindenau-Hafen, SG Leipzig-Mitte, SG Böhlitz-Ehrenberg and SG Leipzig-Leutzsch. SG Leipzig-Leutzsch is considered the closest descendant to TuRa 1899 Leipzig.); Dissolved (1954–63) (Note: BSG Chemie Leipzig was dissolved in 1954, with its players assigned to SC Lokomotive Leipzig. BSG Chemie Leipzig was re-formed in 1963.); BSG Chemie Leipzig (1963-90); FC Grün-Weiß Leipzig (1990); FC Sachsen Leipzig (1990-2011); SG Leipzig-Leutzsch (2011-13); SG Sachsen Leipzig (2013-14)	2	1
1. FC Lokomotive Leipzig°	VfB Leipzig	1. FC Lokomotive Leipzig	VfB Leipzig (1896-98); VfB 1893 Sportbrüder Leipzig (1898-1900); VfB Leipzig (1900-45); SG Probstheida (1946–50); BSG Erich Zeigner Probstheida (1950-53); BSG Einheit Ost (1953-45); SC Rotation Leipzig (1954–63) (Note: SG Probstheida was joined with the new sports club SC Rotation Leipzig in 1954.); SC Leipzig (1963–65) (Note: The two sport clubs SC Lokomotive and SC Rotation were merged in 1963 to form SC Leipzig. The supposedly best football players of the two clubs would play for SC Leipzig. The remainder formed the team of re-established BSG Chemie Leipzig.); 1. FC Lokomotive Leipzig (1966-1991) (Note: The football department of SC Leipzig was separated from the sports club in 1966 to form football club 1. FC Lokomotive Leipzig.); VfB Leipzig (1991–2004 (Note: 1. FC Lokomotive Leipzig took the historic name VfB Leipzig after German re-unification, but the club was declared bankrupt in 2004. 1. FC Lokomotive Leipzig was re-established by fans in late 2003 and began play in 2004.)	-	4
1. FC Magdeburg°	None (founded 1945)	1. FC Magdeburg	SG Sudenburg (1945); SG Lemsdorf (1945); SAG Krupp Grusson (1945–50); Eintracht Sudenburg (1945–51); BSG Stahl Magdeburg (1951–52); BSG Motor Mitte Magdeburg (1952–57); SC Aufbau Magdeburg (1957–65); SC Magdeburg (1965)	3	8
BSG Einheit Pankow	SG Pankow-Nord	VfB Einheit zu Pankow	VfB Pankow (1893–1945, 1949–50); SG Pankow Nord (1945–51); PSV Einheit Pankow (1990–91)	-	-
BSG Motor WEMA Plauen	VFC Plauen	VFC Plauen	SG Plauen-West (1946–49); Sachsenverlag Plauen (1949–51); Rotation Plauen (1951–55); Wismut Plauen (1955–63)	-	-
BSG Stahl Riesa	Riesaer SV	BSG Stahl Riesa	SC Riesa (1903–05); FC Wettin (?–1917); SG Riesa (1945–48); Riesaer SV (1905–45); Stahlwerk Riesa (1945–48); FC Stahl Riesa (1990–91); Riesaer SV Blau-Weiß (1991–98); FC Stahl Riesa (1998–2003); TSV Stahl Riesa (2003–12)	-	-
FC Hansa Rostock°	SG Lauter	F.C. Hansa Rostock	SG Lauter (1946–49); BSG Freihet Wismut Lauter (1950–51); BSG Empor Lauter (1951–54) (Note: The football team of BSG Empor Lauter in Lauter in the Ore Mountains was relocated Rostock in Bezirk Rostock in 1954. The team and its place in the DDR-Oberliga was transferred to sports club SC Empor Rostock. Then SED First Secretary in Bezirk Rostock Karl Mewis and SED funcionary Harry Tisch were instrumental in the relocation of BSG Empor Lauter to Rostock.); SC Empor Rostock (1954–65) (Note: FC Hansa Rostock originally began as a football department of SC Empor Rostock.)	1	1
BSG Lokomotive Stendal	Viktoria Stendal	1. FC Lok Stendal	SG Stendal-Nord (1945–48); Blau-Weiss Stendal (1948–49); SG Eintracht Stendal (1949); SG Blau-Weiß Stendal (1949); BSG "Hans Wendler" Stendal (1949–50); FSV Lok Altmark Stendal (1990–2002)	-	-
BSG Sachsenring Zwickau	SG Planitz	FSV Zwickau	SC Planitz (-1945); SG Planitz (1945–49); ZSG Horch Zwickau (1949–50); BSG Motor Zwickau (1950–68)	1	3

° Football clubs (FC), which were founded 1965-66 as centers of high-level football in the GDR.
°° SG Dynamo Dresden was a sports community with FC status.

== See also ==
- All-time DDR-Oberliga table
- List of football clubs in Germany
