= All-time DDR-Oberliga table =

The all-time DDR-Oberliga table is a cumulative record of all match results, points, and goals of every team that played in the former East Germany's first division DDR-Oberliga from its inception in 1949 until its dissolution in 1991 following German reunification. It awards two points for a win and one point for a draw, as this was the system in use at the time. The matches of the transition round made necessary by the adoption of a Soviet-style calendar year schedule in 1955 are not included. In its final season (1990–91), the competition was known as the NOFV-Oberliga, before becoming part of the German Football Association (German: Deutscher Fußball-Bund, DFB).

Although BFC Dynamo are record champions, winning a total of 10 titles, FC Carl Zeiss Jena lead the ranking by points. Wismut Aue, however, hold the record for most seasons, 38. Altogether, 44 clubs competed in the DDR-Oberliga during its history.

Frequent club name changes were a characteristic of East German football and clubs are shown here by the name they last competed under in their final DDR-Oberliga seasons. All other names used by a club when they were part of the DDR-Oberliga are given, but name changes made outside first division play and following German reunification are not shown; see articles on individual clubs for more information.

The all-time table of the DDR-Oberliga:

Rank	Club	other names	Years	Games	W	D	L	GF	GA	GD	Pts	avg. Pts	Current division
1.	FC Carl Zeiss Jena	BSG Motor Jena, SC Motor Jena	35	929	442	213	274	1544	1129	+415	1097:761	1.18	Regionalliga Nordost (IV)
2.	Berliner FC Dynamo	SC Dynamo Berlin, FC Berlin	34	897	441	210	246	1681	1093	+588	1092:702	1.22	Regionalliga Nordost (IV)
3.	SG Dynamo Dresden	SV Deutsche Volkspolizei Dresden, 1. FC Dynamo Dresden	31	832	437	203	192	1637	982	+655	1077:587	1.29	3. Liga (III)
4.	1. FC Lokomotive Leipzig	BSG Einheit Ost, SC Rotation Leipzig; SC Leipzig	36	951	396	247	308	1516	1256	+260	1039:863	1.09	Regionalliga Nordost (IV)
5.	FC Wismut Aue	SC Wismut Karl-Marx-Stadt, BSG Wismut Aue	38	1019	376	266	377	1406	1485	−79	1018:1020	1.00	2. Kreisklasse Erzgebirge (XII)
6.	FC Viktoria 91 Frankfurt	SV Vorwärts KVP Leipzig, ZSK Vorwärts KVP Berlin, ASK Vorwärts Berlin, FC Vorwärts Berlin, FC Vorwärts Frankfurt	35	939	388	238	313	1547	1294	+253	1012:866	1.08	Brandenburg-Liga (VI)
7.	FC Rot-Weiß Erfurt	BSG KWU Erfurt, BSG Turbine Erfurt, SC Turbine Erfurt	37	1001	351	270	380	1467	1479	−12	972:1030	0.97	NOFV-Oberliga Süd (V)
8.	1. FC Magdeburg	SC Aufbau Magdeburg	30	793	365	190	238	1351	1046	+305	920:666	1.16	3. Liga (III)
9.	BSG Sachsenring Zwickau	ZSG Horch Zwickau, BSG Horch Zwickau, BSG Motor Zwickau	35	949	336	218	395	1310	1489	−179	888:1010	0.94	3. Liga (III)
10.	Hallescher FC Chemie	ZSG Union Halle, BSG Turbine Halle, SC Chemie Halle-Leuna, SC Chemie Halle	34	923	309	256	358	1330	1426	−96	874:972	0.95	3. Liga (III)
11.	F.C. Hansa Rostock	SC Empor Rostock	31	819	300	208	311	1114	1105	+9	808:830	0.99	3. Liga (III)
12.	FC Karl-Marx-Stadt	BSG Chemie Karl-Marx-Stadt, SC Motor Karl-Marx-Stadt, SC Karl-Marx-Stadt	31	806	263	243	300	1048	1193	−145	769:843	0.95	Regionalliga Nordost (IV)
13.	BSG Chemie Leipzig	ZSG Industrie Leipzig; SC Lokomotive Leipzig	27	743	263	207	273	1031	1039	−8	733:753	0.99	Club no longer exists
14.	1. FC Union Berlin	SG Union Oberschöneweide, BSG Motor Oberschöneweide, TSC Oberschöneweide, TSC Berlin	19	520	144	135	241	571	868	−297	423:617	0.81	Bundesliga (I)
15.	SC Aktivist Brieske-Senftenberg	BSG Franz Mehring Marga, BSG Aktivist Brieske-Ost	13	377	153	89	135	594	584	+10	395:359	1.05	Landesliga Brandenburg (VII)
16.	BSG Lokomotive Stendal	SG Eintracht Stendal, SG Hans Wendler Stendal	14	403	137	82	184	598	715	−117	356:450	0.88	NOFV-Oberliga Nord (V)
17.	BSG Stahl Riesa		16	416	110	108	198	472	729	−257	326:506	0.78	Sachsenliga (VI)
18.	SC Einheit Dresden	BSG Rotation Dresden	11	325	117	86	122	541	549	−8	320:330	0.98	Landesklasse Sachsen (VII)
19.	BSG Rotation Babelsberg	SG Babelsberg, BSG Märkische Volksstimme Babelsberg	9	260	103	49	108	466	502	−36	255:265	0.98	Landesliga Brandenburg (VII)
20.	BSV Stahl Brandenburg	BSG Stahl Brandenburg	7	182	58	58	66	228	244	−16	174:190	0.96	Landesliga Brandenburg (VII)
21.	BSG Motor Dessau	BSG Waggonfabrik Dessau	5	156	67	29	60	306:277	+29	163	149	1.04	Verbandsliga Sachsen-Anhalt (VI)
22.	BSG Stahl Thale	BSG EHW Thale	4	130	47	27	56	207:230	−23	121	139	0.93	Landesliga Sachsen-Anhalt (VII)
23.	BSG Fortschritt Meerane	SG Einheit Meerane	5	150	44	29	77	246	320	−74	117:183	0.78	Landesklasse Sachsen (VII)
24.	FC Energie Cottbus	SC Cottbus, BSG Energie Cottbus	7	182	36	45	101	165	354	−189	117:247	0.64	Regionalliga Nordost (IV)
25.	BSG Wismut Gera	BSG Gera-Süd, BSG Mechanik Gera, BSG Motor Gera	6	180	36	41	103	225	392	−167	111:249	0.62	Thüringenliga (VI)
26.	SC Fortschritt Weißenfels		5	130	33	36	61	167	226	−59	102:158	0.78	Verbandsliga Sachsen-Anhalt (VI)
27.	BSG Stahl Altenburg	ZSG Altenburg	3	97	27	17	53	129	208	−79	71:123	0.73	Kreisliga Ostthüringen (IX)
28.	BSG Chemie Böhlen		4	104	20	25	59	123	245	−122	65:143	0.63	Kreisoberliga Muldental/Leipziger Land (VIII)
29.	BSG Stahl Eisenhüttenstadt		3	78	14	33	31	72	92	−20	61:95	0.78	Club no longer exists
30.	BSG Empor Lauter		2	60	21	18	21	98	99	−1	60:60	1.00	Club no longer exists
31.	BSG Motor Steinach		2	52	16	12	24	58	85	−27	44:60	0.85	Landesklasse Thüringen (VII)
32.	BSG Chemie Zeitz		2	52	16	12	24	85	113	−28	44:60	0.85	Landesklasse Sachsen-Anhalt (VIII)
33.	BSG Motor Wismar	ZSG Anker Wismar	2	63	16	9	38	92	140	−48	41:85	0.65	Verbandsliga Mecklenburg-Vorpommern (VI)
34.	SG Dresden-Friedrichstadt		1	26	18	3	5	87	29	+85	39:13	1.50	Club no longer exists
35.	BSG Fortschritt Bischofswerda		2	52	13	7	32	47	96	−49	33:71	0.63	Regionalliga Nordost (IV)
36.	ASG Vorwärts Stralsund		2	52	10	13	29	41	94	−53	33:71	0.63	Club no longer exists
37.	BSG Turbine Weimar		1	34	10	6	18	45	71	−26	26:42	0.76	Thüringenliga (VI)
38.	BSG Einheit Pankow	VfB Pankow	2	70	7	9	54	67	228	−158	23:117	0.33	Kreisliga A Berlin (IX)
39.	FC Sachsen Leipzig		1	26	6	10	10	23	38	−15	22:30	0.85	Club no longer exists
40.	SC Neubrandenburg		1	26	7	6	13	34	58	−24	20:32	0.77	Verbandsliga Mecklenburg-Vorpommern (VI)
41.	SV Lichtenberg 47		1	34	6	8	20	49	96	−47	20:48	0.59	Regionalliga Nordost (IV)
42.	ASG Vorwärts Schwerin		1	26	4	3	19	30	84	−54	11:41	0.42	Verbandsliga Mecklenburg-Vorpommern (VI)
43.	BSG Chemie Buna Schkopau		1	26	3	5	18	21	77	−56	11:41	0.42	Club no longer exists
44.	BSG Motor Suhl		1	26	1	3	22	16	92	−76	5:47	0.19	Landesklasse Thüringen (VII)

- Current division as of 2020–21 season.

== See also ==
- All-time Bundesliga table
- List of football clubs in East Germany
