= 1951–52 DDR-Oberliga =

DDR-Oberliga
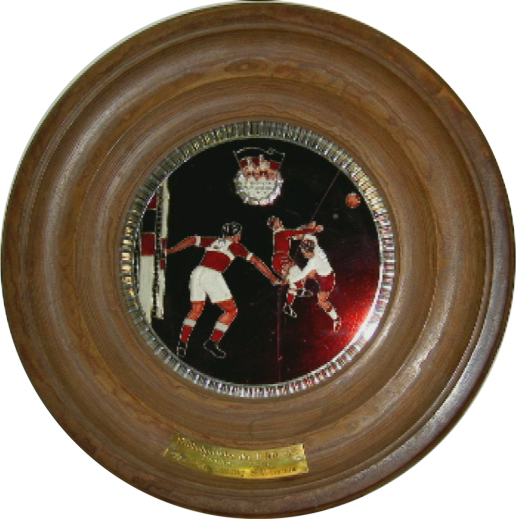
- The 1951–52 championship trophy awarded to Turbine Halle
- Season: 1951–52
- Champions: BSG Turbine Halle
- Relegated: Fortschrit Meerane; BSG Stahl Altenburg; BSG Motor Wismar; Einheit Pankow
- Matches: 342
- Goals: 1,233 (3.61 per match)
- Top goalscorer: Rudolf Krause, Kurt Weißenfels (27)
- Total attendance: 3,620,000
- Average attendance: 10,585

The 1951–52 DDR-Oberliga was the third season of the DDR-Oberliga, the first tier of league football in East Germany.

The league was contested by 19 teams and BSG Turbine Halle won the championship, the club's second one after 1949.

Rudolf Krause of BSG Chemie Leipzig and Kurt Weißenfels of Lokomotive Stendal were the league's joint top scorer with 27 goals each. The season also saw the most goals ever scored in the history of the Oberliga with 1,233, 55 goals more than the previous one.

The 1951–52 season saw the highest spectator number of any DDR-Oberliga season with a total of 3,620,000, in line with the record number of season games played, 342.

== Table ==
The 1951–52 season saw two newly promoted clubs, Wismut Aue and Motor Wismar while SV VP Vorwärts Leipzig was newly formed and admitted to the league. SV VP Vorwärts Leipzig would change its name to SV Vorwärts der HVA Leipzig later in the season.

Pos	Team	Pld	W	D	L	GF	GA	GD	Pts	Qualification or relegation
1	BSG Turbine Halle (C)	36	21	11	4	80	42	+38	53	League champions
2	SV Deutsche Volkspolizei Dresden	36	23	3	10	79	53	+26	49	FDGB-Pokal winners
3	BSG Chemie Leipzig	36	19	9	8	90	53	+37	47	
4	BSG Rotation Dresden	36	19	8	9	73	44	+29	46	
5	BSG Motor Zwickau	36	17	11	8	71	50	+21	45	
6	BSG Rotation Babelsberg	36	18	6	12	75	58	+17	42	
7	BSG Wismut Aue	36	15	10	11	75	62	+13	40	
8	BSG Turbine Erfurt	36	17	5	14	58	47	+11	39	
9	BSG Aktivist Brieske-Ost	36	16	6	14	72	74	−2	38	
10	BSG Lokomotive Stendal	36	16	5	15	70	69	+1	37	
11	BSG Motor Oberschöneweide	36	14	7	15	53	66	−13	35	
12	BSG Motor Dessau	36	14	6	16	67	69	−2	34	
13	BSG Stahl Thale	36	12	7	17	52	59	−7	31	
14	BSG Motor Gera	36	11	9	16	56	72	−16	31	
15	SV Vorwärts der HVA Leipzig	36	10	10	16	57	60	−3	30	
16	BSG Fortschritt Meerane (R)	36	10	6	20	66	89	−23	26	Relegation to DDR-Liga
17	BSG Motor Wismar (R)	36	10	4	22	55	77	−22	24	Relegation to DDR-Liga
18	BSG Stahl Altenburg (R)	36	8	5	23	46	95	−49	21	Relegation to DDR-Liga
19	BSG Einheit Pankow (R)	36	5	6	25	38	94	−56	16	Relegation to DDR-Liga

(C) Champions; (R) Relegated

== Results ==
Home \ Away	ABO	CHM	DVD	PAN	MEE	LST	DES	GER	OBE	WIS	ZWI	BAB	ROT	ALT	THA	ERF	HAL	VLE	AUE
Aktivist Brieske-Ost		2–1	1–0	2–0	4–1	2–0	4–0	0–0	6–0	2–0	3–1	2–2	6–2	5–3	1–1	1–5	0–2	3–2	4–1
Chemie Leipzig	1–1		1–0	5–1	8–1	0–1	2–2	5–2	4–0	7–1	1–1	3–1	1–1	1–0	3–0	4–1	6–0	2–1	4–2
Volkspolizei Dresden	3–2	1–5		1–1	6–0	1–3	2–5	1–0	2–0	3–1	2–0	3–2	0–1	3–0	2–0	1–0	2–1	6–1	4–1
Einheit Pankow	1–2	1–1	1–3		2–1	2–2	0–9	1–4	0–0	4–1	1–2	0–2	1–2	3–1	3–2	1–3	2–5	0–1	1–4
Fortschritt Meerane	7–2	5–1	0–2	1–1		2–0	2–1	1–1	1–3	0–3	5–3	0–1	2–4	3–1	2–3	3–2	1–3	4–0	2–2
Lokomotive Stendal	2–2	2–3	2–4	3–2	5–1		2–4	3–2	1–1	3–0	3–2	2–0	3–1	7–0	1–0	1–0	0–3	4–1	1–1
Motor Dessau	7–1	3–2	1–2	1–0	0–5	3–0		1–3	2–1	4–3	0–3	0–5	0–1	1–2	2–1	4–1	2–2	1–1	2–3
Motor Gera	2–0	1–2	0–4	5–2	1–0	1–1	2–2		3–0	2–1	0–0	0–2	0–2	5–0	2–1	0–1	0–5	2–1	1–1
Motor Oberschöneweide	2–1	5–1	1–1	1–2	1–1	2–5	3–1	2–1		5–2	0–2	6–2	0–2	1–0	1–0	1–1	1–2	3–1	2–1
Motor Wismar	3–3	1–0	1–1	2–1	2–3	3–1	1–0	2–1	0–1		4–0	2–1	0–1	5–3	1–2	1–2	2–2	0–2	4–3
Motor Zwickau	4–2	1–1	1–4	4–0	2–1	3–0	5–2	2–2	4–0	1–0		1–1	3–1	3–1	3–2	2–0	1–1	3–2	4–2
Rotation Babelsberg	5–0	5–0	1–3	2–2	4–4	3–2	1–2	3–2	3–0	3–1	3–2		3–3	2–1	2–1	2–1	3–2	2–0	0–1
Rotation Dresden	3–1	2–3	0–2	3–0	2–2	2–0	0–1	9–0	3–2	2–1	0–0	1–0		7–0	3–0	1–1	0–1	0–2	2–2
Stahl Altenburg	0–2	3–3	2–4	5–1	5–3	2–3	1–1	0–2	2–1	2–1	1–5	4–1	0–3		0–1	0–2	1–2	1–0	3–1
Stahl Thale	1–0	3–1	3–4	2–0	3–0	4–2	2–1	2–2	2–3	3–0	1–1	1–3	0–2	1–1		5–0	1–4	2–2	1–1
Turbine Erfurt	1–2	0–3	2–0	2–0	2–0	4–1	3–0	7–2	0–1	2–1	1–1	1–0	2–1	0–0	4–0		1–2	2–1	1–3
Turbine Halle	4–1	1–1	3–1	2–0	3–0	3–1	0–0	3–2	1–1	3–2	0–0	3–1	2–2	6–0	2–0	0–0		1–1	3–3
Vorwärts HVA Leipzig	3–1	0–3	5–1	6–0	3–0	1–2	0–1	3–3	5–1	2–2	1–1	0–2	1–1	1–1	0–0	0–2	2–1		3–0
Wismut Aue	4–1	1–1	5–0	2–1	3–2	4–1	3–1	2–0	1–1	2–1	2–0	2–2	2–3	5–0	0–1	2–1	1–2	2–2	

Legend: Blue = home team win; Yellow = draw; Red = away team win.
