= 1949 Ostzonenmeisterschaft =

Tournament details
- Country: Soviet occupation zone
- Teams: 10

Final positions
- Champions: Union Halle
- Runners-up: Fortuna Erfurt

Tournament statistics
- Matches played: 9
- Goals scored: 46 (5.11 per match)

The Ostzonenmeisterschaft 1949 (English: Championship of the Eastern Zone) was the second association football championship in what was to become East Germany. As in the previous season, it was played in a one-leg knock-out format with ten participating teams. Each of the five Länder—Mecklenburg-Vorpommern, Brandenburg, Saxony, Thuringia and Saxony-Anhalt—sent two representatives. Unlike the previous season, none of the regional championships was ended early, even if the participants for the championship had already been determined. Last year's winner SG Planitz did not qualify, but finalists SG Freiimfelde Halle – renamed ZSG Union Halle – reached the final again, this time beating Fortuna Erfurt to win their first championship.

== Teams qualified for the play-offs ==
Club	Qualified as
SG Friedrichstadt	Champions of Saxony
SG Meerane	Saxony runners-up
SG Fortuna Erfurt	Champions of Thuringia
SG Altenburg-Nord	Thuringia Runners-up
ZSG Union Halle	Champions of Saxony-Anhalt
SG Eintracht Stendal	Saxony-Anhalt runners-up
SG Babelsberg	Brandenburg champions
SG Franz Mehring Marga	Brandenburg runners-up
SG Wismar-Süd	Mecklenburg-Vorpommern champions
SG Schwerin	Mecklenburg-Vorpommern runners-up

== Play-offs ==
=== Qualifying round ===
8 May 1949

SG Franz Mehring Marga	2–0	SG Schwerin

Cottbus
Attendance: 10,000

8 May 1949

SG Eintracht Stendal	4–3	SG Altenburg-Nord

Planitz

=== Quarter finals ===
29 May 1949

SG Eintracht Stendal	4–0	Franz Mehring Marga

Dessau
Attendance: 7,000

29 May 1949

SG Fortuna Erfurt	10–0	SG Wismar Süd

Jena
Attendance: 10,000

29 May 1949

SG Meerane	3–2	SG Babelsberg

Brandenburg
Attendance: 9,000

29 May 1949

ZSG Union Halle	2–1	SG Friedrichstadt Dresden

Kurt-Wabbel-Stadion, Halle
Attendance: 20,000

=== Semi finals ===
12 Jun 1949

ZSG Union Halle	3–0	SG Eintracht Stendal

Kurt-Wabbel-Stadion, Halle
Attendance: 20,000

12 Jun 1949

SG Fortuna Erfurt	4–3 (a.e.t.)	SG Meerane

Großkampfbahn, Chemnitz
Attendance: 25,000

=== Final ===
26 June 1949

Union Halle	4–1	Fortuna Erfurt
Rappsilber 13', 71'; Theile 48'; Werkmeister 64'	Report	Schmidt 77'

Stadion im Ostragehege, Dresden
Attendance: 50,000
Referee: Gerhard Schulz (Dresden)
