= Ante Šimunac =

Croatian footballer

Personal information
- Date of birth: 12 January 1984 (age 42)
- Place of birth: Munich, West Germany
- Height: 1.75 m (5 ft 9 in)
- Position: Attacking midfielder

Youth career
- 1997–2002: SpVgg Unterhaching
- FC Bayern Munich

Senior career*
Years	Team	Apps	(Gls)
2002–2003	Bayern Munich II	20	(5)
2003–2004	FC Ismaning	14	(4)
2005–2006	Anker Wismar	14	(4)
2005–2006	Göztepe	24	(12)
2007–2008	Inter Zaprešić	3	(0)
2008	Baltika Kaliningrad	10	(0)
2009–2010	IFK Mariehamn	40	(4)
- * Club domestic league appearances and goals as of 12 October 2009

Ante Šimunac (born 12 January 1984 in Munich, Germany) is a Croatian retired footballer.
