= Franziska Müller =

German handball player (born 1990)

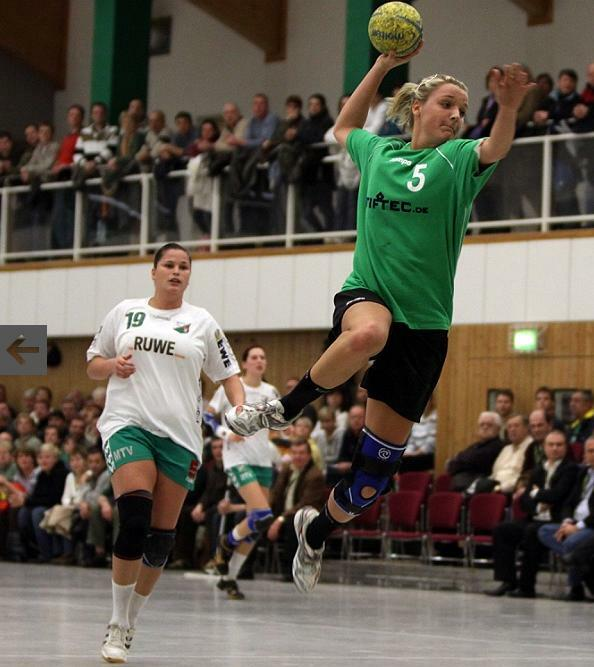

Personal information
- Nationality: German
- Born: 12 March 1990 (age 36) Berlin-Buch, Germany
- Height: 1.75 m (5 ft 9 in)

Sport
- Sport: Handball
- Position: Left wing
- Current club: Retired
- Number: 5

Youth career
- Years: Team
- 1998–2007: SV Berliner VG 49

Senior clubs
- Years: Team
- 2007–2009: SV Berliner VG 49
- 2009–2010: Füchse Berlin
- 2010–2019: HSG Blomberg-Lippe
National team
| Years | Team | Apps | (Gls) |
| 2015–2019 | Germany | 31 | (59) |

Franziska Müller (born 12 March 1990) is a German former handball player who retired in 2019 while playing for HSG Blomberg-Lippe. She also featured in the German national team.

She participated at the 2018 European Women's Handball Championship.
