= Heinz Wozniakowski =

German footballer

Personal information
- Full name: Heinz Wozniakowski
- Date of birth: 24 December 1924
- Place of birth: Breslau, Weimar Republic
- Date of death: 1963 (aged 38–39)
- Position: Forward

Senior career*
Years	Team	Apps	(Gls)
- Breslauer FV 06
- FC 93 Mülhausen
1950–1951	BSG KWU Erfurt	49	(20)
1951–1958	Eintracht Braunschweig	133	(72)

International career
1953	West Germany Amateur	1	(0)
- * Club domestic league appearances and goals

Heinz Wozniakowski (24 December 1924 – 1963) was a German football player. He began his career with Breslauer FV 06 and FC 93 Mülhausen. After the Second World War he joined BSG KWU Erfurt (later renamed into Turbine and finally Rot-Weiß Erfurt) in the East German Oberliga, at the time one of the best sides in the country. In 1951 Wozniakowski left East Germany together with his teammate Winfried Herz, to join the West German club Eintracht Braunschweig. Wozniakowski went on to play 7 seasons for Eintracht Braunschweig, until he retired in 1958.

== Honours ==
Club

- DDR-Oberliga runner-up: 1950-51
- FDGB-Pokal runner-up: 1949-50
