= 1948 Ostzonenmeisterschaft =

Tournament details
- Country: Soviet occupation zone
- Teams: 10

Final positions
- Champions: SG Planitz
- Runner-up: Freiimfelde Halle
- German football championship: SG Planitz

Tournament statistics
- Matches played: 9
- Goals scored: 30 (3.33 per match)

The Ostzonenmeisterschaft 1948 (English: Championship of the Eastern Zone) was the first football championship in what was to become East Germany. It was played in a one-leg knock-out format with ten participating teams. Each of the five Länder—Mecklenburg-Vorpommern, Brandenburg, Saxony, Thuringia and Saxony-Anhalt—sent two representatives. The regional championships of Saxony, Thuringia and Saxony-Anhalt were ended after the semi-finals as by then two participants had been determined. The Ostzone champion was supposed to take part in the 1948 German championship, playing 1. FC Nürnberg in Stuttgart, but the team of SG Planitz was not allowed to travel for political reasons.

== Teams qualified for the play-offs ==
Club	Qualified as
SG Planitz	Representative of Saxony
SG Meerane	Representative of Saxony
SG Weimar-Ost	Representative of Thuringia
SG Sömmerda	Representative of Thuringia
SG Freiimfelde Halle	Representative of Saxony-Anhalt
SG Sportfreunde Burg	Representative of Saxony-Anhalt
SG Cottbus-Ost	Brandenburg champions
SG Babelsberg	Brandenburg vice-champions
SG Schwerin	Mecklenburg-Vorpommern champions
SG Wismar-Süd	Mecklenburg-Vorpommern runners-up

== Play-offs ==
=== Qualifying round ===
13 June 1948

SG Sportfreunde Burg	1 – 0	SG Sömmerda

Ernst Abbe Sportfeld, Jena
Attendance: 20,000

13 June 1948

SG Meerane	3 – 1	SG Babelsberg

Westsachsenstadion, Planitz
Attendance: 10,000

=== Quarter finals ===
20 June 1948

SG Meerane	2 – 1 (a.e.t.)	SG Sportfreunde Burg

Leipzig
Attendance: 15,000

20 June 1948

SG Schwerin	1 – 3	SG Planitz

Schwerin
Attendance: 11,000

20 June 1948

SG Cottbus-Ost	0 – 1 (a.e.t.)	SG Weimar-Ost

Cottbus
Attendance: 15,000

20 June 1948

SG Freiimfelde Halle	3 – 1	SG Wismar-Süd

Halle
Attendance: 10,000

=== Semi finals ===
27 June 1948

SG Freiimfelde Halle	5 – 2	SG Meerane

Magdeburg
Attendance: 10,000

27 June 1948

SG Planitz	5 – 0	SG Weimar-Ost

Ostragehege, Dresden
Attendance: 25,000

=== Final ===
4 July 1948

SG Planitz	1–0	Freiimfelde Halle
Weiß 38'	Report

Probstheidaer Stadion, Leipzig
Attendance: 40,000
Referee: Kurt Liebschner (Weißenfels)

== Sources ==
East Germany 1947/48 at rsssf.com
