= Hallescher FC =

- Full name: Hallescher Fußball-Club e.V.
- Nickname: Chemie
- Founded: 26 January 1966; 60 years ago
- Stadium: Leuna-Chemie-Stadion
- Capacity: 15,057
- President: Jürgen Fox
- Head coach: Robert Schröder
- League: Regionalliga Nordost
- 2025–26: Regionalliga Nordost, 4th of 18
- Website: hallescherfc.de
Home colours	Away colours	Third colours

Hallescher FC, formerly known as Hallescher FC Chemie, is a German association football club based in Halle an der Saale, Saxony-Anhalt. The club currently plays in the Regionalliga, the fourth highest level in the German football league system.

For many years, Halle had been in East Germany's highest league, the DDR-Oberliga, up-until the German reunification. However, like many other teams from the former East, it then suffered the effects of economic and demographic decline in the region in the 1990s and fell down to amateur leagues. Since 2000, Hallescher FC has ended its downward trend and in the 2011–12 season, they finally returned to a professional football league after 20 years of absence. They were relegated to the Regionalliga in 2024.

== History ==
=== Origins (1900–1945) ===
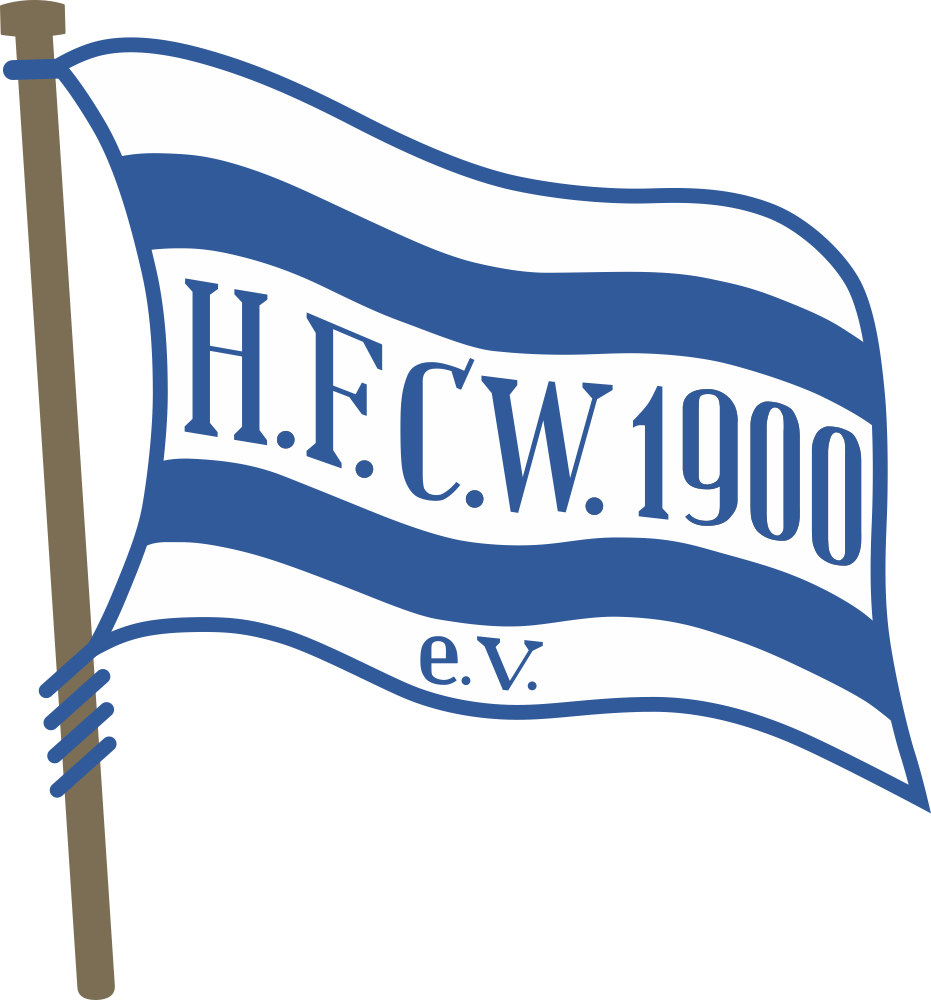
Logo of Wacker Halle

The origins of the club can be traced back to Hallescher Fussball-Club Wacker 1900, founded in 1900 and generally referred to as Wacker Halle, which won the Saale district – named after the river Saale – of the Central German championship twelve times between 1910 and its last edition 1933. These are all to be considered championships of one of numerous German first divisions. Main rivals here were Hallescher FC and to a lesser extent Borussia Halle, Sportfreunde Halle and SV Halle 98.

Those title qualified for participation in the Central German Championships which Wacker won 1921 and 1928. In the ensuing play-off matches for the German Championship, Wacker reached the semi-finals in 1921, there losing at home in front of a crowd of 12,000 1–5 to the later winners 1. FC Nürnberg. In 1928, 10,000 saw a 0–3 quarter-final exit versus FC Bayern Munich. In 1933–34 Wacker became first champions of the newly incepted central German division of the Gauliga. In the qualification group for the semi-finals of the national championship, Wacker came with one win and five defeats last behind 1. FC Nürnberg, Dresdner SC and Borussia Fulda. In the next seasons, Wacker finished second and seventh before being relegated as ninth to second division. In 1941, the club returned to Gauliga and achieved third places in the first two seasons and eighth in 1944.

=== Background (1945–1954) ===
After World War II Wacker Halle was dissolved, like all German clubs. In 1946 SG Halle-Glaucha (SG stands for "sports community", Glaucha is an inner neighbourhood) was formed. In 1948, the new club was renamed into SG Freiimfelde Halle, Freiimfelde being an inner eastern district. In April 1949, the footballers of Freiimfelde, after having won the championship of Saxony-Anhalt, joined ZSG Union Halle, the Central Sports Community of the People-Owned Enterprises of Halle. The team from Halle reached the final of the Soviet zone, winning the 1949 Championship of the Eastern Zone with a 4–1 victory over SG Fortuna Erfurt in front of 50,000 in the Ostragehege stadium of Dresden.

Still in the same year ZSG Union became one of the founding members of the Oberliga, the first division of the German Democratic Republic, the state founded on 7 October 1949 on the territory of the Soviet zone. The team finished the first two seasons on fifth, respectively sixth spot. After the first season the team played as BSG Turbine Halle. Attendance average in 1950–51 was just under 10.000.

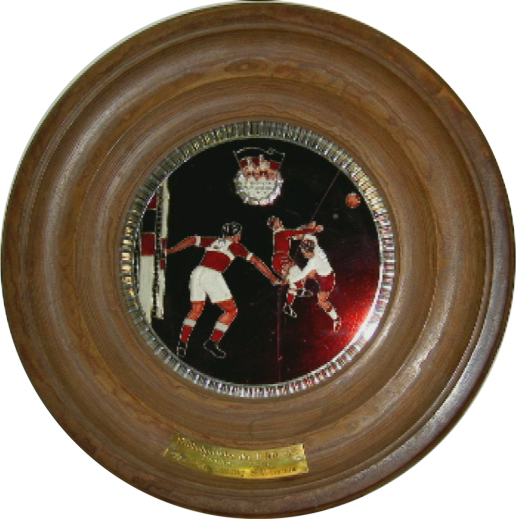
The championship plate of 1952

In the season 1951–52 the average rose to 22,170 per match and Turbine won the championship of East Germany, ahead of SV Deutsche Volkspolizei Dresden and defenders BSG Chemie Leipzig. The form could not be retained and Turbine finished in 1953 on the 13th spot. Worse, after this season some of the most important players like Otto Knefler and coach Alfred "Fred" Schulz, who led the team to both championships, made off to West Germany in the context of the uprising of 1953 in East Germany. Nevertheless, in the 1953–54 DDR-Oberliga Turbine could improve to 8th position.

=== Sports clubs SC Chemie Halle-Leuna and SC Chemie Halle (1954–1966) ===
The East German authorities were motivated by the West German 1954 World Cup win in Switzerland to make improvements to football in their country. A number of BSGs were transformed to "Sport Clubs", often part of major bodies of industry.

This led to the foundation of SC Chemie Halle-Leuna on 18 September 1954 in Halle. A large part of the football department of BSG Turbine Halle was then transferred to the new sports club. SC Chemie Halle-Leuna was also given the spot in the DDR-Oberliga of BSG Turbine Halle. BSG Turbine Halle continued to exist, but forthwith played in lower leagues. SC Chemie Halle-Leuna exists as Hallescher FC these days. Both Turbine Halle and Hallescher FC claim the era between 1945 and 1954 as part of their history.

SC Chemie Halle-Leuna was then merged with sports club SC Wissenschaft Halle to form the new sports club SC Chemie Halle on 30 June 1958.

=== Football club HFC Chemie (1966–1991) ===
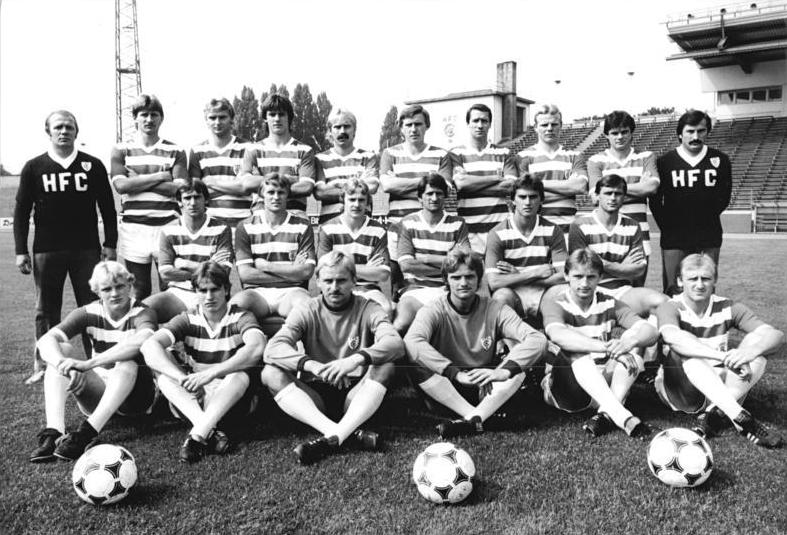
HFC Chemie team photo, Oberliga-season 1983.

The team would be renamed Hallescher FC Chemie in 1966. The name change reflected the separation of football departments from their parent sports clubs all across East Germany, forming football clubs, as sports bureaucrats strove to build a powerful national football team. The football department of SC Chemie Halle was separated from the sports club and re-organized as football club Hallescher FC Chemie on 26 January 1966.

As SC Chemie Halle-Leuna the side won its first East German Cup in 1956, and a second one in 1962, this time as SC Chemie Halle. The club played in the premier DDR-Oberliga as a middling side, with the occasional lapse that would drop them to the second tier DDR-Liga. Their best result in this period was third place Oberliga finish in 1970–71 that earned them a first-round UEFA Cup appearance. After holding Dutch team PSV Eindhoven to a 0–0 draw at home, the team were caught in the Hotel 't Silveren Seepaerd fire ahead of the return leg, resulting in the death of midfielder Wolfgang Hoffmann and serious injury to several others. Halle withdrew from the competition immediately.

=== Play in reunified Germany (1991–present) ===
In 1991, after the last season of the DDR-Oberliga, they were placed 10th in the All-time DDR-Oberliga table. The club had also formed a significant number of players for the East Germany national football team, such as Dariusz Wosz and Bernd Bransch.

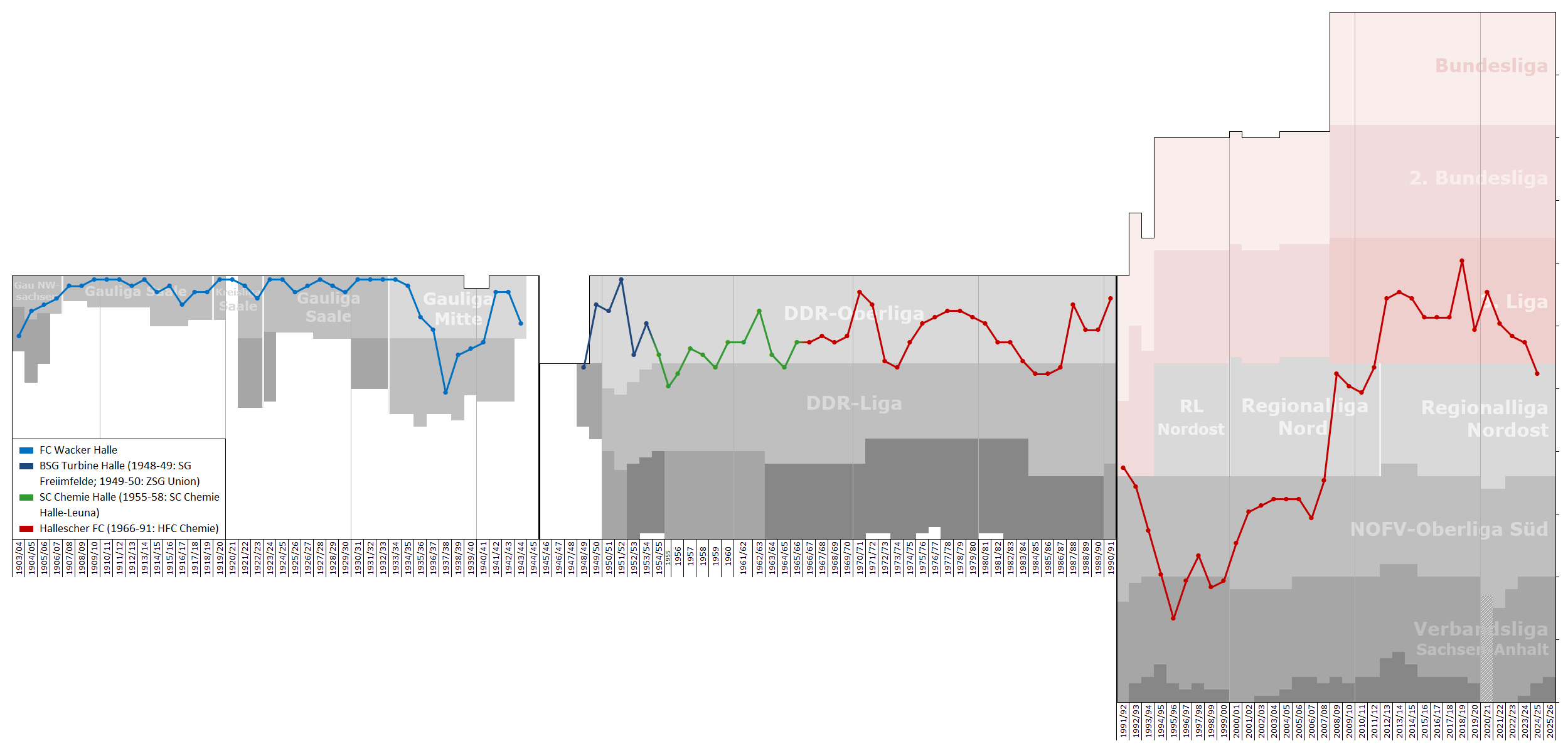
Historical chart of Hallescher FC league performance

With German reunification in 1990, and the merger of the country's eastern and western leagues, the club entered the 2. Bundesliga as Hallescher FC, the second highest all-German league. However, a lot of important former players had already left the club for Western German or other European clubs and therefore in the 1991–1992 season, they finished second to last. Following this, they were relegated to the NOFV-Oberliga. However, this was only the beginning of a steady decline that followed and the club descended down to the Verbandsliga Sachsen-Anhalt (fifth level league) by the 1995–96 season. The 1999–2000 season was a turning point for Halle, they finally returned to the NOFV-Oberliga where they stayed until 2008. In 2007, Sven Köhler became the team's manager and managed to secure a first place in the NOFV-Oberliga Süd 2007–2008. Hallescher FC was promoted to the Regionalliga Nord. They surprisingly finished their first Regionalliga season as a runner-up and only narrowly missed their second promotion within only two seasons. Finally, in the 2011–12 season, Hallescher FC managed to succeed in a neck-and-neck race with Holstein Kiel and RB Leipzig and was able to secure the first place. This meant a direct qualification for the 3. Liga and marked their return to a professional football league after a 20-year absence. Hallescher FC finished 3. Liga as 10th in 2012–13 and 2014–15 and as 9th in 2013–14 seasons. They were relegated again in 2024 after a 17th-place finish.

== Honours ==
- DDR-Oberliga
  - Winners: 1949, 1952
- East German Cup
  - Winners: 1956, 1962
- NOFV-Oberliga Süd (IV)
  - Champions: 2008
- Regionalliga Nord (IV)
  - Champions: 2012
- Verbandsliga Sachsen-Anhalt (IV)
  - Champions: 1997, 2000
- Saxony-Anhalt Cup (Tiers III–VI)
  - Winners: 1994, 2002, 2008, 2010, 2011, 2012, 2015, 2016, 2019, 2023, 2024, 2025, 2026
  - Runners-up: 2009, 2014, 2021

== Players ==
=== Current squad ===
As of 8 September 2026

Note: Flags indicate national team as defined under FIFA eligibility rules; some limited exceptions apply. Players may hold more than one non-FIFA nationality.

No.	Pos.	Nation	Player
1	GK	GER	Sven Müller
2	DF	KAZ	Robert Berger
3	DF	GER	Niklas Kastenhofer
5	DF	GER	Burim Halili
9	FW	POR	Bocar Baro
10	FW	GER	Osman Atılgan
11	FW	GER	Fabrice Hartmann
13	MF	GER	Niclas Stierlin
17	MF	GER	Max Kulke
18	FW	GER	Lucas Ehrlich
19	DF	GER	Romeo Trinko
20	DF	GER	Keno-Miguel Meyer
23	MF	GER	Marius Hauptmann

No.	Pos.	Nation	Player
24	DF	GER	Pascal Schmedemann
25	MF	GER	Lennard Becker
27	DF	GER	Vin Kastull
29	FW	GER	Emilio Stobbe
30	FW	MOZ	Stanley Ratifo
31	DF	GER	Niklas Landgraf (captain)
32	GK	GER	Luca Bendel
33	GK	GER	Moritz Schulze
34	DF	GER	Felix Langhammer
43	FW	GER	Julien Damelang
77	MF	GER	William Seel
90	FW	GER	Soufian Benyamina

=== Out on loan ===
Note: Flags indicate national team as defined under FIFA eligibility rules; some limited exceptions apply. Players may hold more than one non-FIFA nationality.

No.	Pos.	Nation	Player
8	MF	GER	Elias Lorenz (at VfL Halle 1896 until 30 June 2027)

=== Notable former players ===
The following players represented the East Germany national football team whilst playing for Hallescher FC.

- Jens Adler
- Bernd Bransch
- Erich Haase
- Günter Imhof
- Erhard Mosert
- Frank Pastor
- Werner Peter
- Dieter Strozniak
- Klaus Urbanczyk
- Horst Walter
- Dariusz Wosz
