= 1953–54 DDR-Oberliga =

DDR-Oberliga
- Season: 1953–54
- Champions: BSG Turbine Erfurt
- Relegated: BSG Lokomotive Stendal; Motor Dessau; BSG Stahl Thale
- Matches played: 210
- Goals scored: 676 (3.22 per match)
- Top goalscorer: Heinz Satrapa (21)
- Total attendance: 2,941,000
- Average attendance: 14,005

The 1953–54 DDR-Oberliga was the fifth season of the DDR-Oberliga, the first tier of league football in East Germany.

The league was contested by fifteen teams, two less than in the previous season, and BSG Turbine Erfurt won the championship. It was the first of two championships for the club, winning it the following season as well.

Heinz Satrapa of BSG Wismut Aue was the league's top scorer with 21 goals.

The 1953–54 season saw the best-ever average support for the Oberliga with 14,005 spectators per game.

== Table ==
The 1953–54 season saw two newly promoted clubs, Fortschritt Meerane and Einheit Ost Leipzig. The FDGB-Pokal was won by second division DDR-Liga club ZSK Vorwärts Berlin.

| Pos | Team | Pld | W | D | L | GF | GA | GR | Pts | Qualification |
|---|---|---|---|---|---|---|---|---|---|---|
| 1 | BSG Turbine Erfurt (C) | 28 | 17 | 5 | 6 | 58 | 36 | 1.611 | 39 | League champions |
| 2 | BSG Chemie Leipzig | 28 | 15 | 5 | 8 | 51 | 37 | 1.378 | 35 | |
| 3 | SG Dynamo Dresden | 28 | 15 | 4 | 9 | 54 | 44 | 1.227 | 34 | |
| 4 | BSG Wismut Aue | 28 | 15 | 3 | 10 | 59 | 42 | 1.405 | 33 | |
| 5 | BSG Rotation Babelsberg | 28 | 12 | 8 | 8 | 58 | 43 | 1.349 | 32 | |
| 6 | BSG Aktivist Brieske-Ost | 28 | 11 | 8 | 9 | 48 | 43 | 1.116 | 30 | |
| 7 | BSG Rotation Dresden | 28 | 9 | 10 | 9 | 46 | 39 | 1.179 | 28 | |
| 8 | BSG Turbine Halle | 28 | 11 | 6 | 11 | 30 | 30 | 1.000 | 28 | |
| 9 | BSG Empor Lauter | 28 | 8 | 11 | 9 | 40 | 38 | 1.053 | 27 | |
| 10 | BSG Fortschritt Meerane | 28 | 8 | 9 | 11 | 46 | 46 | 1.000 | 25 | |
| 11 | BSG Motor Zwickau | 28 | 10 | 5 | 13 | 39 | 56 | 0.696 | 25 | |
| 12 | BSG Einheit Ost | 28 | 9 | 5 | 14 | 43 | 57 | 0.754 | 23 | |
| 13 | BSG Lokomotive Stendal (R) | 28 | 6 | 11 | 11 | 38 | 51 | 0.745 | 23 | Relegation to DDR-Liga |
| 14 | BSG Motor Dessau (R) | 28 | 7 | 9 | 12 | 38 | 55 | 0.691 | 23 | Relegation to DDR-Liga |
| 15 | BSG Stahl Thale (R) | 28 | 4 | 7 | 17 | 28 | 59 | 0.475 | 15 | Relegation to DDR-Liga |

(C) Champions; (R) Relegated

== Results ==
| Home \ Away | ABO | CHM | DRE | EOL | EMP | MEE | LST | DES | ZWI | BAB | RDD | THA | ERF | HAL | AUE |
|---|---|---|---|---|---|---|---|---|---|---|---|---|---|---|---|
| Aktivist Brieske-Ost | | 0–0 | 3–5 | 2–1 | 1–1 | 4–2 | 3–3 | 5–2 | 3–0 | 3–1 | 0–4 | 4–0 | 3–1 | 2–2 | 3–2 |
| Chemie Leipzig | 3–0 | | 2–3 | 2–1 | 2–0 | 2–0 | 2–2 | 1–1 | 3–2 | 3–1 | 2–0 | -:+ (Note: The match between Chemie Leipzig and Stahl Thale (originally 6–3) was scored 0–0 and a victory for Thale. The players from Chemie Leipzig, who had changed at their home Georg-Schwarz-Sportpark in Leutzsch, arrived late for the game at the Bruno-Plache-Stadion in Probstheida because of a bus breakdown.) | 2–0 | 1–0 | 3–2 |
| Dynamo Dresden | 1–0 | 0–3 | | 3–2 | 0–0 | 1–3 | 2–0 | 4–0 | 3–0 | 0–0 | 1–1 | 2–0 | 4–2 | 3–0 | 2–1 |
| Einheit Ost Leipzig | 2–1 | 1–5 | 2–3 | | 2–4 | 1–1 | 2–0 | 3–0 | 0–1 | 3–2 | 0–3 | 3–2 | 0–0 | 0–1 | 1–2 |
| Empor Lauter | 0–0 | 1–1 | 1–2 | 4–0 | | 0–0 | 2–2 | 4–2 | 2–1 | 2–2 | 1–1 | 5–1 | 1–4 | 1–0 | 2–0 |
| Fortschritt Meerane | 1–2 | 3–1 | 4–2 | 1–2 | 3–1 | | 1–2 | 1–1 | 4–1 | 1–1 | 2–1 | 5–1 | 0–0 | 2–0 | 3–3 |
| Lokomotive Stendal | 1–2 | 2–2 | 3–3 | 1–1 | 1–0 | 1–1 | | 3–0 | 1–1 | 1–1 | 2–2 | 4–2 | 0–3 | 0–1 | 1–3 |
| Motor Dessau | 2–3 | 2–4 | 3–1 | 0–1 | 2–1 | 2–0 | 3–2 | | 1–4 | 3–1 | 2–0 | 0–0 | 2–5 | 1–1 | 1–1 |
| Motor Zwickau | 1–0 | 4–1 | 0–4 | 2–1 | 0–5 | 3–1 | 1–1 | 0–3 | | 2–2 | 0–1 | 1–0 | 0–3 | 1–2 | 2–3 |
| Rotation Babelsberg | 1–1 | 2–0 | 5–3 | 4–2 | 5–0 | 4–3 | 2–0 | 1–1 | 2–2 | | 4–2 | 2–1 | 1–2 | 3–1 | 2–0 |
| Rotation Dresden | 1–1 | 3–1 | 3–0 | 2–2 | 2–0 | 1–1 | 4–0 | 2–2 | 2–2 | 2–1 | | 3–4 | 0–2 | 1–0 | 0–1 |
| Stahl Thale | 0–0 | 1–2 | 3–0 | 2–4 | 1–1 | 1–1 | 0–3 | 0–0 | 1–2 | 0–4 | 1–1 | | 2–2 | 0–1 | 0–1 |
| Turbine Erfurt | 2–1 | 3–0 | 1–0 | 3–3 | 2–0 | 2–1 | 1–2 | 2–1 | 5–2 | 3–2 | 1–0 | 3–5 | | 1–0 | 2–0 |
| Turbine Halle | 1–0 | 1–2 | 1–0 | 0–1 | 1–1 | 2–0 | 2–0 | 1–1 | 1–2 | 2–1 | 1–1 | 2–0 | 1–1 | | 5–1 |
| Wismut Aue | 3–1 | 2–1 | 1–2 | 6–2 | 0–0 | 4–1 | 4–0 | 4–0 | 1–2 | 0–1 | 5–3 | 3–0 | 3–2 | 3–0 | |

Legend: Blue = home team win; Yellow = draw; Red = away team win.
