= Kurt-Wabbel-Stadion =

Football stadium in Halle, Germany

Coordinates: 51°27′55″N 11°57′43″E

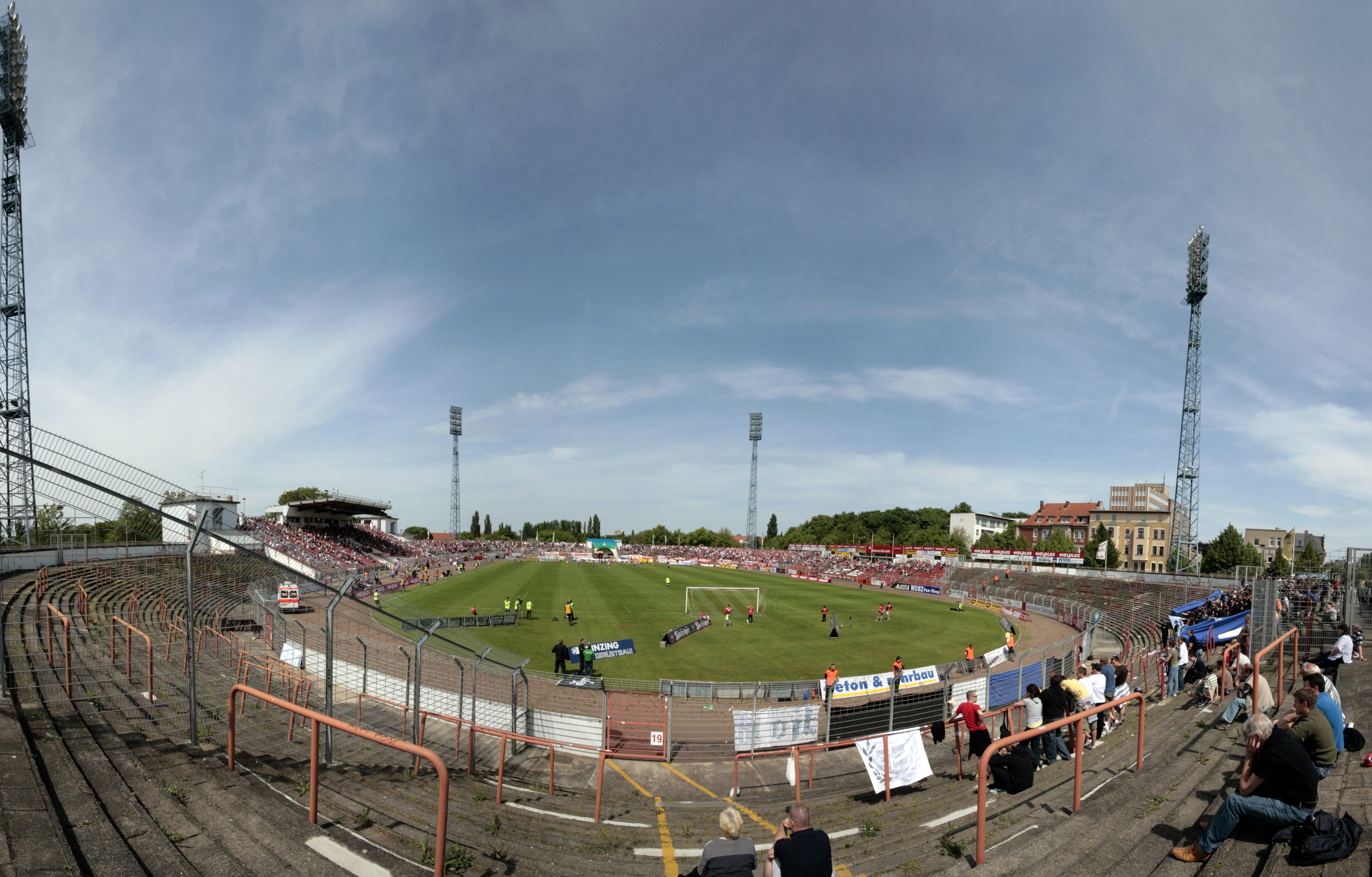
Kurt-Wabbel-Stadion during a Hallescher FC match in 2009

Kurt-Wabbel-Stadion was a multi-purpose stadium in Halle, Saxony-Anhalt, Germany. It was used mostly for football matches and was the home of Hallescher FC until 2010. It had a capacity of 23,860.

The stadium was opened in 1936 and was originally named after SA officer Horst Wessel, before it was renamed the Kurt-Wabbel-Stadion, in honour of Kurt Wabbel following the end of World War Two. The stadium was used by BSG Turbine Halle and HFC Chemie. HFC Chemie later became Hallescher FC.

It was closed in 2010 and replaced by Erdgas Sportpark.
