= 1950–51 DDR-Oberliga =

DDR-Oberliga
- Season: 1950–51
- Champions: BSG Chemie Leipzig
- Relegated: BSG Turbine Weimar; SV Lichtenberg
- Matches: 306
- Goals: 1,178 (3.85 per match)
- Top goalscorer: Johannes Schöne (37)
- Total attendance: 2,635,800
- Average attendance: 8,614

The 1950–51 DDR-Oberliga was the second season of the DDR-Oberliga, the first tier of league football in East Germany.

The league was contested by 18 teams and BSG Chemie Leipzig won the championship after a championship play-off with BSG Turbine Erfurt because the two teams finished on equal points. It was Chemie Leipzig's first-ever East German championship, with the club winning a second one in 1963–64.

Johannes Schöne of BSG Rotation Babelsberg was the league's top scorer with 37 goals, the highest total of any DDR-Oberliga top scorer throughout the history of the league. The 1950–51 season also saw the highest-ever goal average for the league with 3,85 goals scored per game. While the total goals scored was second only to the following season, 1,178 compare to 1,233, the 1951–52 season had 19 instead of 18 clubs in the league and therefore 36 extra season games.

== Table ==
The 1950–51 season saw SV Deutsche Volkspolizei Dresden take the place of SG Friedrichstadt while SG Union Oberschöneweide, VfB Pankow and SG Lichtenberg 47 moved across from the Stadtliga Berlin and BSG Rotation Dresden, BSG Stahl Thale and BSG Turbine Weimar were promoted from the second level. Originally four clubs were scheduled to be relegated but the two East Berlin clubs SG Union Oberschöneweide and VfB Pankow were allowed to remain in the league for the following season.

Pos	Team	Pld	W	D	L	GF	GA	GD	Pts	Qualification or relegation
1	BSG Chemie Leipzig (Note: BSG Chemie Leipzig defeated BSG Turbine Erfurt 2–0 in the championship decider) (C)	34	22	6	6	66	33	+33	50	League champions
2	BSG Turbine Erfurt	34	22	6	6	80	37	+43	50	
3	BSG Motor Zwickau	34	17	9	8	72	35	+37	43	
4	SV Deutsche Volkspolizei Dresden	34	17	9	8	75	40	+35	43	
5	BSG Aktivist Brieske-Ost	34	20	3	11	87	79	+8	43	
6	BSG Turbine Halle	34	16	8	10	74	50	+24	40	
7	BSG Stahl Thale	34	17	5	12	82	65	+17	39	
8	BSG Rotation Babelsberg	34	18	3	13	95	78	+17	39	
9	BSG Motor Dessau	34	14	6	14	68	62	+6	34	
10	BSG Fortschritt Meerane	34	12	8	14	65	71	−6	32	
11	BSG Stahl Altenburg	34	12	7	15	46	61	−15	31	
12	BSG Rotation Dresden	34	12	6	16	64	61	+3	30	
13	BSG Motor Gera	34	9	12	13	59	63	−4	30	
14	BSG Lokomotive Stendal	34	12	5	17	73	73	0	29	
15	SG Union Oberschöneweide	34	9	8	17	49	72	−23	26	
16	BSG Turbine Weimar (R)	34	10	6	18	45	71	−26	26	Relegation to DDR-Liga
17	SG Lichtenberg 47 (R)	34	6	8	20	49	96	−47	20	Relegation to DDR-Liga
18	VfB Pankow	34	2	3	29	29	131	−102	7	

Source: RSSSF.com
Rules for classification: 1) Points;
(C) Champions; (R) Relegated

== Results ==
Home \ Away	ABO	CHM	MEE	LIC	LST	DES	GER	ZWI	PAN	BAB	ROT	ALT	THA	ERF	HAL	WEI	OBE	VOL
Aktivist Brieske-Ost		1–2	6–2	3–3	2–3	3–2	1–0	2–0	4–1	1–5	2–0	2–0	4–2	1–3	3–0	2–0	3–1	5–2
Chemie Leipzig	5–1		4–1	4–0	3–4	2–1	3–2	2–2	4–0	1–0	4–0	0–1	2–1	0–1	2–1	2–0	0–0	1–2
Fortschritt Meerane	2–2	2–3		5–1	1–1	3–1	2–1	1–1	7–0	0–0	4–1	1–1	1–2	1–2	2–2	1–0	3–1	3–3
SG Lichtenberg 47	4–6	2–3	1–2		2–3	2–0	2–2	2–4	4–2	3–2	1–0	1–4	0–3	2–5	0–0	1–1	4–1	1–1
Lokomotive Stendal	7–1	0–1	3–4	1–0		1–1	3–4	0–0	8–1	5–1	1–4	1–3	1–2	3–1	0–6	6–1	3–0	0–2
Motor Dessau	1–3	3–1	1–1	3–0	1–1		4–1	3–0	4–1	1–0	3–1	4–0	6–0	2–3	2–1	3–0	1–0	2–1
Motor Gera	0–4	0–0	0–3	4–0	4–1	1–1		3–3	4–1	1–2	5–3	2–2	1–0	1–1	1–1	8–0	1–1	2–2
Motor Zwickau	8–1	0–2	5–0	3–0	4–1	4–2	1–0		6–0	4–1	0–1	4–0	2–0	3–1	2–0	3–0	2–0	3–1
VfB Pankow	1–4	0–1	1–3	1–1	2–2	3–1	0–1	0–0		0–2	1–5	3–1	2–6	0–5	0–1	1–2	2–3	0–4
Rotation Babelsberg	5–3	1–1	5–2	5–3	4–0	4–1	6–0	1–0	1–0		1–0	6–1	1–2	1–2	7–2	1–1	3–2	3–5
Rotation Dresden	3–1	0–2	7–2	3–0	1–2	7–3	1–1	1–1	3–0	2–3		1–0	1–1	3–3	2–3	3–2	4–0	0–3
Stahl Altenburg	1–1	1–1	1–0	2–0	2–1	+:- (Note: The match between Stahl Altenburg and Motor Dessau (originally 1–3) was scored 0–0 and a win for Altenburg because Dessau used an unauthorized player.)	2–1	1–2	5–1	1–1	1–2		4–5	0–0	0–3	2–0	1–0	0–0
Stahl Thale	3–5	3–2	5–1	4–5	4–3	5–5	5–0	2–2	9–0	4–2	3–2	2–4		4–2	3–4	3–2	3–0	2–0
Turbine Erfurt	6–0	1–2	1–0	4–0	4–1	1–2	4–2	2–0	3–1	2–1	1–1	5–1	2–1		4–1	0–0	4–0	2–1
Turbine Halle	1–0	0–1	4–0	6–1	2–1	3–0	1–1	0–0	8–1	5–1	1–1	3–1	2–3	1–1		7–1	1–1	2–1
Turbine Weimar	2–3	0–2	0–3	6–0	0–4	2–0	2–1	2–1	4–2	2–2	3–0	3–1	3–1	0–2	0–1		4–2	1–1
Union Oberschöneweide	3–5	1–1	2–1	2–2	3–1	3–3	0–3	3–2	7–0	2–4	1–0	3–1	2–1	0–2	4–1	1–1		0–0
Volkspolizei Dresden	1–2	1–2	3–1	1–1	2–1	4–1	1–1	0–0	8–1	6–0	2–1	2–1	5–1	1–0	3–0	1–0	5–0	

Legend: Blue = home team win; Yellow = draw; Red = away team win.

== Name changes ==
Compared to the previous season all eleven clubs that had retained their league place changed their name during the off-season and in the season.

1949–50 name	1950–51 name
ZSG Horch Zwickau	BSG Motor Zwickau
Waggonbau Dessau	Motor Dessau
KWU Erfurt	Turbine Erfurt
Union Halle	Turbine Halle
Franz Mehring Marga	Aktivist Brieske-Ost
Märkische Volksstimme Babelsberg	Rotation Babelsberg
Industrie Leipzig	Chemie Leipzig
Einheit Meerane	Fortschrit Meerane
Hans Wendler Stendal	Lokomotive Stendal
SG Gera	Motor Gera
ZSG Altenburg	Stahl Altenburg
