= Dieter Strozniak =

East German footballer

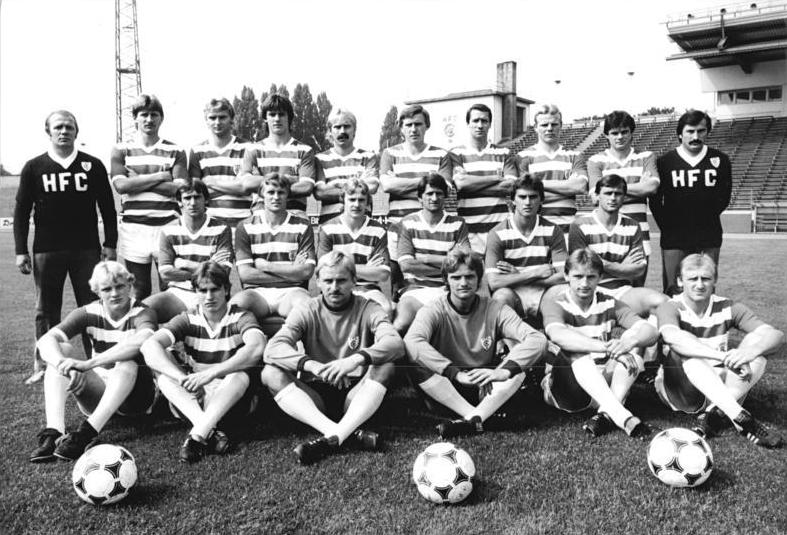
- Dieter Strozniak (middle row, second from left) as part of Hallescher FC Chemie in 1983

Personal information
- Date of birth: January 14, 1955 (age 71)
- Place of birth: Halle, East Germany
- Position: Midfielder

Team information
- Current team: Hallescher FC (Coach)

Youth career
- 1968–1973: Hallescher FC Chemie

Senior career*
| Years | Team | Apps | (Gls) |
| 1973–1986 | Hallescher FC Chemie | 310 | (25) |
| 1986–1990 | BSG Chemie Buna Schkopau | 140 | (18) |

International career
| 1980–1982 | East Germany | 6 | (0) |
- * Club domestic league appearances and goals

Dieter Strozniak (born January 14, 1955) is a German former international footballer.

== Club career ==
He appeared in 245 East German top-flight matches.

== International career ==
Strozniak won six caps for the then East Germany national team.
