= SG Dynamo Schwerin (2003) =

- Full name: Sportgemeinschaft Dynamo Schwerin e.V.
- Founded: 27 November 2003; 22 years ago
- Ground: Sportpark Lankow, Schwerin
- Capacity: 2,000
- Chairman: Maik Ventzke
- Head coach: Jano Klempkow
- League: Verbandsliga Mecklenburg-Vorpommern (VI)
- 2025–26: NOFV-Oberliga, 14th of 16 (relegated)
- Website: https://sg-dynamo-schwerin-ev.de/

SG Dynamo Schwerin, also known as Dynamo Schwerin, is a German football club from Schwerin in Mecklenburg-Vorpommern. It was founded in 2003 and plays in the Verbandsliga Mecklenburg-Vorpommern. The home ground of Dynamo Schwerin is Sportpark Lankow.

== History ==
=== 1953–2003: Background ===
Historically, SG Dynamo Schwerin refers to a sports community of the SV Dynamo sports association founded in 1953. SV Dynamo was the sport association related to the Volkspolizei and the Stasi. In 1990 SG Dynamo Schwerin (during the Peaceful Revolution renamed to PSV Schwerin) reached the FDGB Cup final, losing 2–1 against Dynamo Dresden. The next season PSV Schwerin played against Austria Wien in the UEFA Cup Winners' Cup, losing 0–2 on aggregate.

After the German reunification PSV Schwerin (after 1991 renamed to 1. FSV Schwerin) went through a number of mergers and finally in 2013 merged with FC Mecklenburg Schwerin. Therefore there is no formal historical link between the historical club and the new Dynamo founded in 2003, although the new SG Dynamo does place itself in the old Dynamo tradition.

=== 2003–present ===
At first Dynamo competed in the Kreisliga. After three consecutive promotions, the club played for fourteen years in the Landesliga West in Mecklenburg-Vorpommern (7th level). Dynamo was promoted to the Verbandsliga Mecklenburg-Vorpommern on a points per game basis after the 2020/2021 season was cut short due to the corona virus pandemic. The next season the club achieved another promotion to the Oberliga Nordost (5th level). Dynamo Dresden legend, and former East German footballer of the year, Torsten Gütschow became the new coach of Dynamo for the 2023–24 season. However, due to lack of success in the 2023–24 NOFV-Oberliga Nord, Gütschow was dismissed after just two and a half months in office.

== Stadium ==
The home ground of Dynamo is Sportpark Lankow, which it shares with FC Mecklenburg Schwerin.

Dynamo was based at the Sportplatz Paulshöhe in the district of Ostorf in until June 2022. The Paulshöhe sports centre was the home ground of the old SG Dynamo Schwerin during the East German era.

The club and its supporters unsuccessfully campaigned for the preservation of the Paulshöhe sports center as the oldest sports field in the city of Schwerin. In 2010, however, the city council decided to redevelop the sports area into a residential area.

== Extreme right affiliations ==
Part of the supporters are considered right-wing extremists and belong to the hooligan scene. In 2017 it was discovered that a NPD linked company was a sponsor of Dynamo, after which the club ended cooperation with the company. Jens-Holger Schneider, former chairman of SG Dynamo, is considered to have been part of the right-wing extremist scene in Mecklenburg-Vorpommern for many years and has been a member of the Mecklenburg-Vorpommern Landtag for the AfD since 2017.

== Honours ==
- Verbandsliga Mecklenburg-Vorpommern (VI)
  - Champions: 2021–2022
