= Turbine Halle =

German sports club

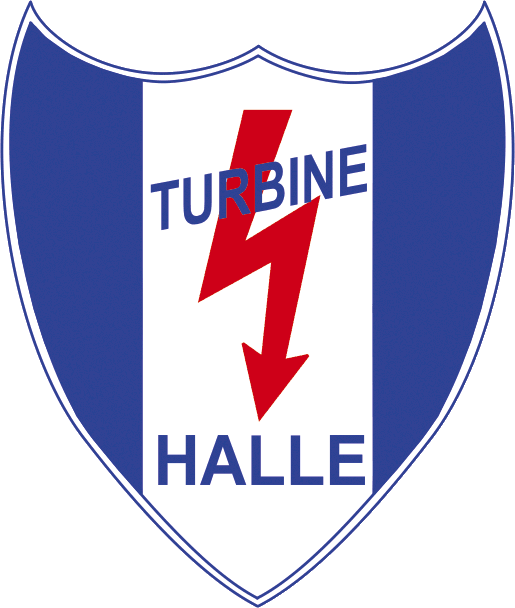
- Full name: Turbine Halle e.V.
- Founded: 15 July 1950
- Ground: Sportanlage Felsen
- Capacity: 1,000 (about 70 seated)
- League: Landesklasse Sachsen-Anhalt 4 (VIII)
- 2015–16: 9th
Home colours	Away colours

Turbine Halle is a sports club based in the quarter of Giebichenstein in the city of Halle in the eastern German state of Saxony-Anhalt. With about 1,000 members in departments for track and field, association football, speedskating, table tennis, fistball, aerobics, sports for the handicapped and gymnastics it belongs to the biggest clubs of the city.

The club sees itself being in continuation of the history of the Hallescher Fussball-Club Wacker 1900, founded in 1900. In its current form the club was founded on 15 July 1950 as BSG Turbine Halle, BSG being the abbreviation for Betriebssportgemeinschaft, meaning "company sports community," which was an organisational form of sports clubs in East Germany.

The club since has experienced numerous fusions and name changes. SC Chemie Halle-Leuna had been former as a local center of excellence on 18 September 1954. Large parts of the football departement of BSG Turbine Halle, including the first team and its place in the DDR-Oberliga, was delegated to sports club SC Chemie Halle-Leuna in November 1954. The football department was later separated from the sports club and re-organized as today's football club Hallescher FC. This club also maintains a claim to the footballing history of Turbine until 1954.

The most noteworthy successes of Wacker and Turbine have been the Central German Championships of 1921, 1928 and 1934 and East German championships in 1949 and 1952.

== History ==
Wacker Halle, as the club was generally referred to, won the Saale district – named after the river Saale – of the Central German championship twelve times between 1910 and its last edition 1933. These are all to be considered championships of one of numerous German first divisions. Main rivals here were Hallescher FC and to a lesser extent Borussia Halle, Sportfreunde Halle and SV Halle 98.

Those title qualified for participation in the Central German Championships which Wacker won 1921 and 1928. In the ensuing play-off matches for the German Championship Wacker reached the semifinals in 1921, there losing at home in front of a crowd of 12,000 1–5 to the later winners 1. FC Nürnberg. In 1928 10,000 saw a 0–3 quarterfinal exit versus FC Bayern Munich. In 1933–34 Wacker became first champions of the newly incepted central German division of the Gauliga. In the qualification group for the semifinals of the national championship Wacker came with one win and five defeats last behind 1. FC Nürnberg, Dresdner SC and Borussia Fulda. In the next seasons Wacker finished second and seventh before being relegated as ninth. In 1941 the club managed to return and achieved third places in the first two seasons and eighth in 1944.

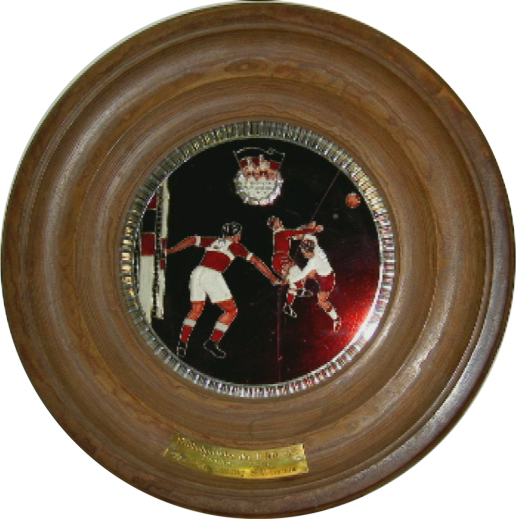

The championship plate of 1952

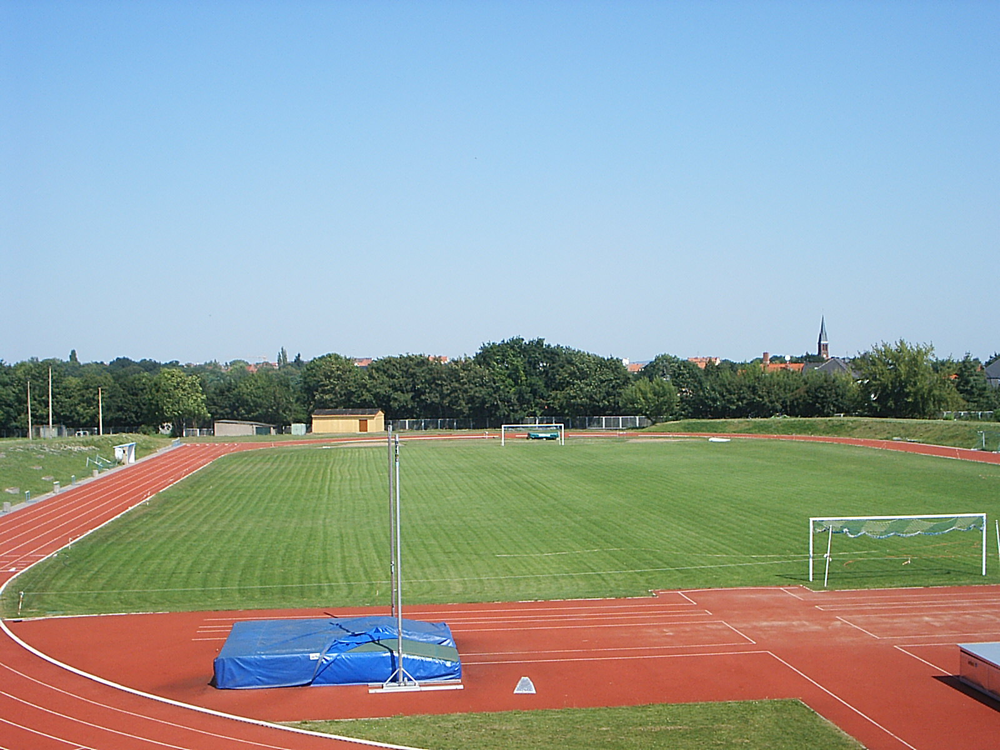
Felsensportplatz, current ground of Turbine Halle

After World War II Wacker Halle was dissolved, like all German clubs, and in 1946 SG Halle-Glaucha (SG stands for "sports community", Glaucha is an inner neighbourhood) was formed. In 1948 the new club was renamed into SG Freiimfelde Halle, Freiimfelde being an inner eastern district. In April 1949 the footballers of Freiimfelde, after having won the championship of Saxony-Anhalt, joined ZSG Union Halle, the Central Sports Community of the People-Owned Enterprises of Halle. The team from Halle reached the final of the Soviet zone, winning the 1949 Championship of the Eastern Zone with a 4–1 victory over SG Fortuna Erfurt in front of 50,000 in the Ostragehege stadium of Dresden.

Still in the same year ZSG Union became one of the founding members of the Oberliga, the first division of the German Democratic Republic, the state founded on 7 October 1949 on the territory of the Soviet zone. The team finished the first two seasons on fifth, respectively sixth spot. After the first season the team played as BSG Turbine Halle. Attendance average in 1950–51 was just under 10.000.

In the season 1951–52 the average rose to 22,170 per match and Turbine won the championship of East Germany, ahead of SV Deutsche Volkspolizei Dresden and defenders BSG Chemie Leipzig. The form could not be retained and Turbine finished in 1953 on the 13th spot. Worse, after this season some of the most important players like Otto Knefler and coach Alfred "Fred" Schulz, who led the team to both championships, made off to West Germany in the context of the uprising of 1953 in East Germany. Nevertheless, in the 1953–54 DDR-Oberliga Turbine could improve to 8th position.

The East German authorities were motivated by the West German World Cup win 1954 in Switzerland to make improvements to football in their country. BSGs were transformed to "Sport Clubs," often part of major bodies of industry. In Halle this led to the foundation of SC Chemie Halle-Leuna on 18 September 1954 and a large part of the football department of Turbine was transferred to this new entity. Chemie Halle-Leuna were given the Oberliga spot of Turbine, which was kept alive but forthwith played in lower leagues. Chemie Halle-Leuna these days exists as Hallescher FC. Both clubs, Turbine and Hallescher FC, claim the era between 1945 and 1954 as part of their history.

BSG Turbine Halle was in 1990, after the re-unification of Germany, renamed to UTSV Turbine Halle; in 1995 the UTSV part was dropped. The football department of the club remains in the lower divisions and it plays today in the eighth tier Landesklasse.

== Stadium ==
From 1936 to 1954 the club was at home at the Kurt-Wabbel-Stadion, which had a peak capacity of 35,000. Later, the Felsensportplatz, generally called the "Felsen," dating back to the 1930s, became the club's homeground. The peak capacity before the removal of the stands in 1999 was 12,000.

== Honours ==
- Championship of the Eastern Zone
  - Champions: 1949
- DDR-Oberliga
  - Champions: 1952
