= Günter Busch =

German footballer

Personal information
- Date of birth: 15 February 1930
- Place of birth: Großpösna, Germany
- Date of death: 9 August 2006 (aged 76)
- Position: Goalkeeper

International career
Years	Team	Apps	(Gls)
1954–1957	East Germany	2	(0)

Günter Busch (15 February 1930 – 9 August 2006) was a German footballer.

== Club career ==
He appeared in 258 East German top-flight matches.

== International career ==
Busch played in two matches for the East Germany national football team from 1954 to 1957.
