= Verbandsliga Mecklenburg-Vorpommern =

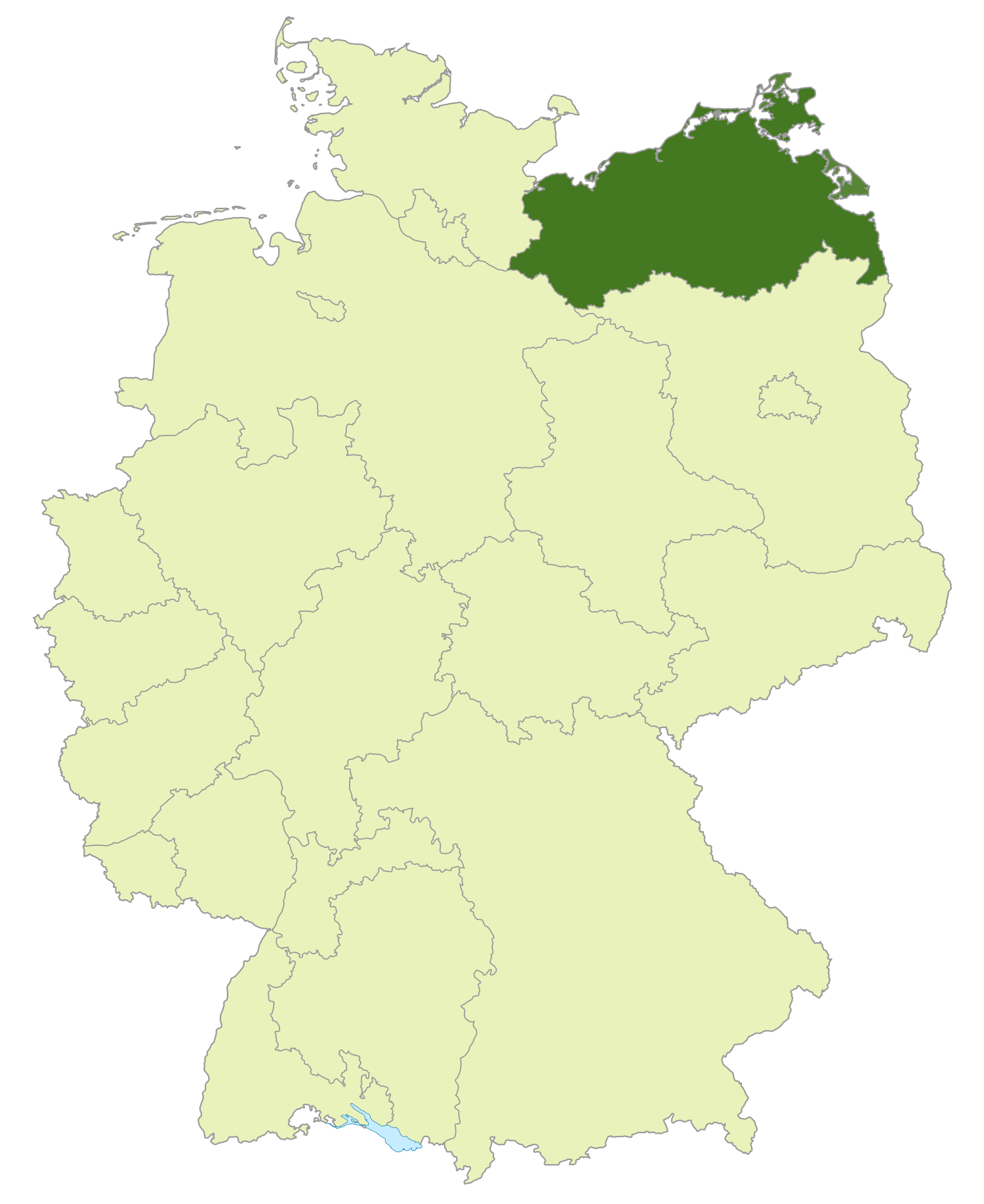
- Founded: 1991
- Country: Germany
- Confederation: UEFA
- Divisions: 1
- Number of clubs: 16
- Level on pyramid: 6
- Promotion to: NOFV-Oberliga Nord
- Relegation to: Landesliga Nord; Landesliga Ost; Landesliga West
- Current champions: Dynamo Schwerin (2021–22)

The Verbandsliga Mecklenburg-Vorpommern is the sixth tier of the German football league system and the highest league in the German state of Mecklenburg-Western Pomerania. Until the introduction of the 3. Liga in 2008 it was the fifth tier of the league system, until the introduction of the Regionalligas in 1994 the fourth tier.

== Overview ==
The Verbandsliga Mecklenburg-Vorpommern was established in 1991 from sixteen clubs as a highest league for the German state of Mecklenburg-Western Pomerania and the Mecklenburg-Western Pomerania State Football Association, LFVMV (German: Landesfußballverband Mecklenburg-Vorpommern). It comprised the area of the three Bezirksligen of Rostock, Neubrandenburg and Schwerin. Each of those three Bezirke contributed four to five clubs to the new league, with two clubs coming from the 2nd Division. The Verbandsliga Mecklenburg-Vorpommern was the last of the five leagues established at this level in former East Germany, a year after the other four. The league was originally named Landesliga Mecklenburg-Vorpommern and changed to the Verbandsliga in 1996.

The Mecklenburg-Vorpommern Football Association was formed on 14 July 1990.

Throughout its existence, the league operated on a strength of sixteen clubs, occasionally diverting to seventeen to level out promotion and relegation.

The Verbandsliga was and is a feeder league to the NOFV-Oberliga Nord, together with the Berlin-Liga and Brandenburg-Liga, which its champion is directly promoted to. As such, it was the fourth tier of the German league system.

With the introduction of the Regionalliga Nordost as third tier of the league system in 1994, the Verbandsligen slipped to tier five. In 2008, the league was again demoted one level when the 3. Liga was established. However, this did not change anything in the leagues status as a feeder league to the NOFV-Oberliga.

The extended board of the Mecklenburg-Vorpommern State Football Association (LFVMV) decided on 7 May 2020 to end the 2019-20 season prematurely, following the suspension of the game operations on 13 March due to the COVID-19 pandemic in Germany. The official and final standings was set using the points per game quotient rule after an additional decision by the LFV on 26 May. There were therefore no champions, only table leaders. Also, the 2020-21 season was ended prematurely.

== League champions ==
The league champions:

Season	Champions
1991–92	F.C. Hansa Rostock II
1992–93	FSV Schwerin
1993–94	VfL Rostock
1994–95	Parchimer FC
1995–96	F.C. Hansa Rostock II
1996–97	TSG Neustrelitz
1997–98	FC Schönberg 95
1998–99	SV Warnemünde
1999–2000	FC Anker Wismar
2000–01	FC Eintracht Schwerin
2001–02	TSG Neustrelitz
2002–03	Sievershäger SV
2003–04	FC Anker Wismar
2004–05	Torgelower SV Greif
2005–06	FC Schönberg 95
2006–07	Greifswalder SV
2007–08	FSV Bentwisch
2008–09	FC Schönberg 95
2009–10	FC Anker Wismar
2010–11	1. FC Neubrandenburg 04
2011–12	Pommern Greifswald
2012–13	Sievershäger SV
2013–14	SV Waren 09
2014–15	FC Anker Wismar
2015–16	FC Mecklenburg Schwerin
2016–17	Torgelower FC Greif
2017–18	Greifswalder FC
2018–19	MSV Pampow
2019–20	None
2020–21	FC Mecklenburg Schwerin
2021–22	SG Dynamo Schwerin

Source: "Verbandsliga Mecklenburg-Vorpommern". Das deutsche Fußball-Archiv (in German).

- In 2020, FC Anker Wismar led the table after the 2019–20 season was curtailed but declined promotion. Second-placed Rostocker FC was promoted instead.

== Founding members of the league ==
The league was established from sixteen clubs from four leagues in 1991. Most of the East German clubs changed their names in the years after the reunion, some reverted to their old ones after a brief period, current names, when different from the one in 1991, are listed. The clubs are:

From the DDR-Liga Staffel A:

- Schweriner SC, merged to form FC Eintracht Schwerin
- TSV 1860 Stralsund, football team now part of FC Pommern Stralsund

From the Bezirksliga Rostock:

- VfL Rostock, now Polizei SV Rostock again
- TSG Wismar, now FC Anker Wismar
- Grün-Weiß Rostock, now Rostocker FC
- ESV Greifswald, merged to form Greifswalder SV
- F.C. Hansa Rostock II

From the Bezirksliga Schwerin:

- FSV Schwerin, merged to form FC Eintracht Schwerin
- FSV Laage 07
- SG Aufbau Boizenburg
- VfL Güstrow, now Güstrower SC 09

From the Bezirksliga Neubrandenburg:

- TSG Neustrelitz
- Malchower SV
- TSV 1814 Friedland
- Lok Pasewalk, now Pasewalker FV
- SV Tollense Neubrandenburg, merged to form 1. FC Neubrandenburg 04
