= SV Berliner Verkehrsbetriebe =

German sports club

SV Berliner VB 49
- Full name: Sportverein Berliner Verkehrsbetriebe 49 e.V.
- Nickname(s): BVB
- Founded: 1949
- Ground: BVG-Stadion Siegfriedstraße
- League: Kreisliga Berlin B Staffel 4 (IX)
- 2021–22: 3rd
Home colours	Away colours

SV Berliner VB 49 is a sports club from the city of Berlin, Germany, that is best known for its handball department. The club also fields an association football club.

== History ==
The club was formed following World War II in June 1949 in the Soviet-occupied eastern half of the country. The rise of Cold War tensions and the establishment of East Germany was quickly followed by the formation of separate sporting competitions including the Deutscher Fußball-Verband der DDR (en: East German Football Association).

The club originally played as BSG der BVG Berlin and was created as the sports club of the Berliner Verkehrs Aktiengesellschaft (BVG, en: Berlin Transport Corporation) which managed the city's public transportation services. In 1951, it was renamed Lok Lichtenberg before being joined by Einheit Pankow in September 1954 and talking up that club's place in domestic competition. Einheit would later be recreated in 1958 as a merger of Lok Pankow and Lok Bau Union Buchholz.

By 1958, Lok Lichtenberg had advanced to the second tier 2. DDR-Liga. In September of that season the team took the name Berliner Verkehrsbetriebe and ended their campaign in 9th place. The following year they finished in 14th place and were relegated. Between 1955 and 1959, the club made several appearances in the opening rounds of the FDGB-Pokal (East German Cup), but were always eliminated in the early going.

The club changed its name to SV Berliner Verkehrsbetriebe 49 in 1990 after the fall of the Berlin Wall and German reunification. The footballers play today in Kreisliga B (X).
