= Winfried Herz =

German footballer (1929–2022)

Personal information
- Full name: Winfried Herz
- Date of birth: 11 May 1929
- Place of birth: Erfurt, Germany
- Date of death: 9 December 2022 (aged 93)
- Position: Forward

Youth career
- SC Erfurt

Senior career*
Years	Team	Apps	(Gls)
1948–1951	BSG KWU Erfurt	43	(25)
1951–1961	Eintracht Braunschweig	171	(67)

International career
1953	West Germany Amateur	1	(0)
- * Club domestic league appearances and goals

Winfried Herz (11 May 1929 – 9 December 2022) was a German football player. He started his career with BSG KWU Erfurt (later renamed into Turbine and finally Rot-Weiß Erfurt) in East Germany, at the time one of the best sides in the country. In 1951 Herz fled into West Germany for political reasons, where he joined Eintracht Braunschweig. Herz went on to play 10 seasons for Eintracht Braunschweig, until he retired in 1961.

Herz also represented East Germany several times during the early 1950s. However, since those games were played before the East German Football Association became a FIFA member in 1952, they are not considered official internationals. He died on 9 December 2022, at there age of 93.

== Honours ==
Club

- DDR-Oberliga runner-up: 1950-51
- Soviet Zone championship runner-up: 1948-49
- FDGB-Pokal runner-up: 1949-50
