= FC Mecklenburg Schwerin =

German football club

- Full name: Fußball-Club Mecklenburg Schwerin e.V.
- Founded: 28 May 2013; 13 years ago
- Ground: Sportpark Lankow
- Capacity: 1,500
- President: Andreas Ruhl
- Head coach: Stefan Lau
- League: NOFV-Oberliga Nord (V)
- 2025–26: Verbandsliga Mecklenburg-Vorpommern, 2nd of 18 (promoted)
- Website: www.fcm-schwerin.de
Home colours	Away colours

FC Mecklenburg Schwerin is a German football club based in Schwerin in Mecklenburg-Vorpommern. The club was formed from a merger in 2013 and competes in the fifth tier NOFV-Oberliga Nord. The club plays its home matches at the Sportpark Lankow. FC Mecklenburg Schwerin also has gymnastics squads and an Esports department.

== History ==
FC Mecklenburg Schwerin was established from a merger of FC Eintracht Schwerin and FC Mecklenburg Schwerin on 28 May 2013. The club incorporates the history of several historical football clubs in Schwerin, such as Schweriner FC 03, BSG Einheit Schwerin, SC Traktor Schwerin, BSG Motor Schwerin, SG Dynamo Schwerin and ISG Schwerin.

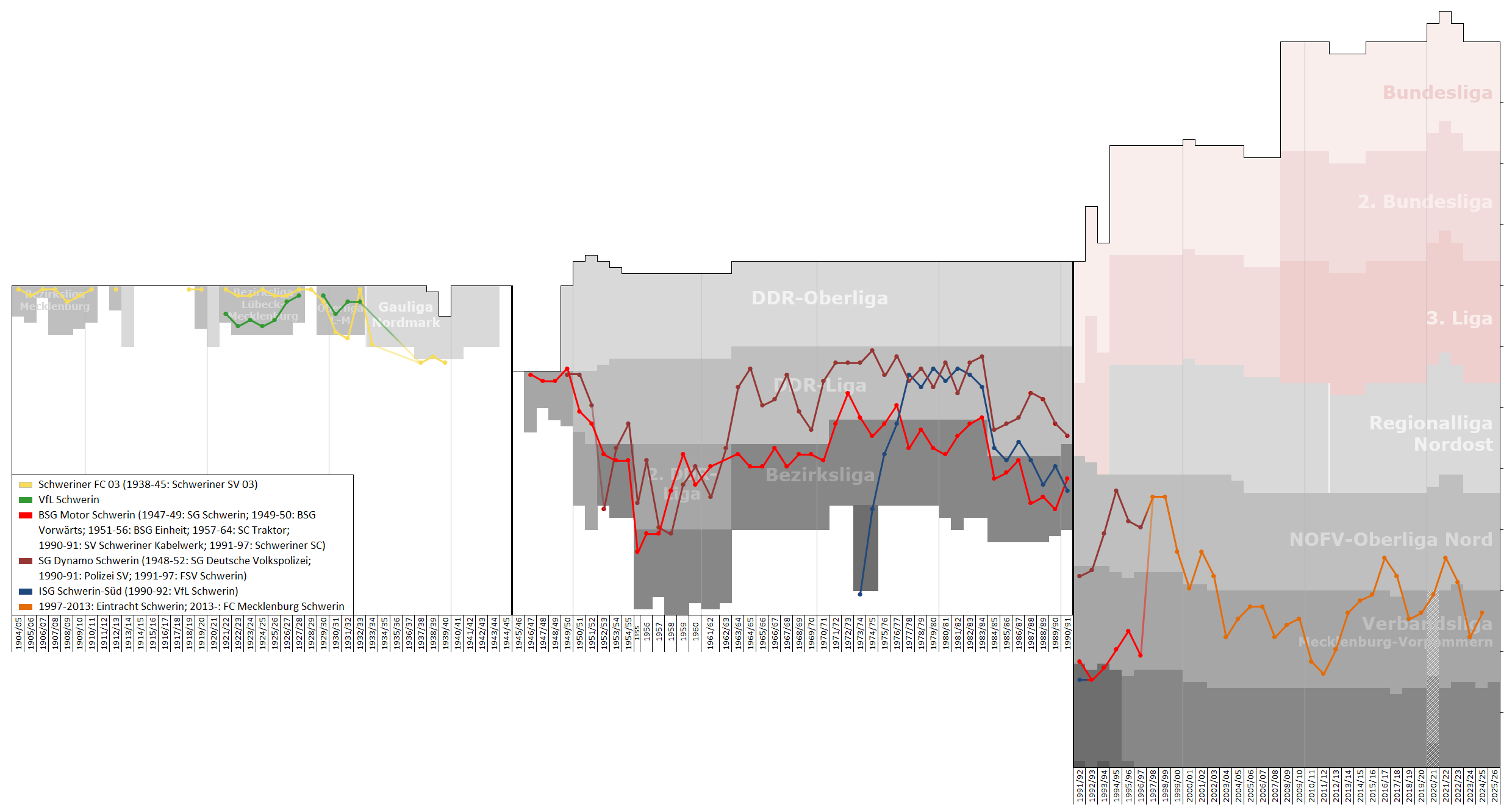
Historical chart of the club's league performance

=== FC Eintracht Schwerin ===
FC Eintracht Schwerin was formally founded as SG Schwerin in 1945, but the club can trace its history back the oldest football club in Schwerin. SG Schwerin was founded as a successor to Schweriner FC 03, which had been founded in 1903. Schweriner FC 03 was dissolved the Allied occupation authorities in 1945.

SG Schwerin became BSG Vorwärts Schwerin in 1949 and then BSG Einheit Schwerit in 1951. The next change occurred when the club was joined with the newly founded sports club SC Traktor Schwerin in 1956. SC Traktor Schwerin was also joined by parts of the team of army-sponsored ASG Vorwärts Schwerin. The football department of SC Traktor Schwerin was then joined with BSG Motor Schwerin on 1 August 1964. BSG Motor Schwerin had been founded earlier the same year.

BSG Motor Schwerin was renamed BSG Motor Kabelwerk Schwerin in 1988. The club became SV Schweriner Kabelwerk in 1990 and finally Schweriner SC in 1991. Schweriner SC was then joined by VfL Schwerin in 1992. VfL Schwerin had been known as ISG Schwerin during the East German era. The club was reformed as VfL Tiefbau in 1990. It then became VfL Schwerin in 1991 and was joined by FSV Grün-Weiß Schwerin at the same time. FSV Grün-Weiß Schwerin had been known as BSG Chemie Schwerin until 1990. The football department of Schweriner SC separated from the sports club and formed football club FC Eintracht Schwerin in 1996.

=== 1. FSV Schwerin ===
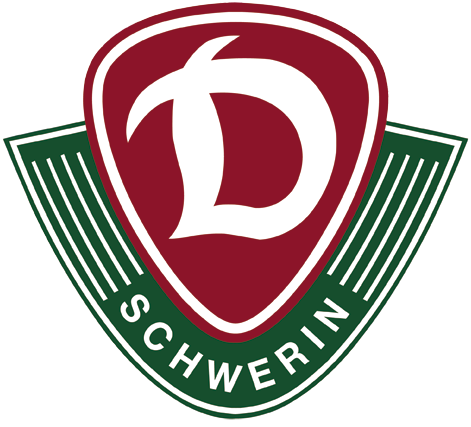
The crest of SG Dynamo Schwerin.

FC Eintracht Schwerin was joined by 1. FSV Schwerin on 1 July 1997. 1. FSV Schwerin was originally founded as SG Volkspolizei Schwerin in 1948. The club was renamed SV Deutsche Volkspolizei Schwerin after the founding of sports association SV Deutsche Volkspolizei in 1950. The team of SV Deutsche Volkspolizei Schwerin and its place in the DDR-Liga was relocated to Rostock in 1952 where it continued as SV Deutsche Volkspolizei Rostock. (Note: SV Deutsche Volkspolizi Rostock became SG Dynamo Rostock in 1953. It was then renamed SG Dynamo Rostock-Mitte in 1964. Norbert Trieloff and Frank Rohde began playing football at SG Dynamo Rostock-Mitte before they joined the youth academy of BFC Dynamo. The two became successful players of BFC Dynamo and won several titles with the club. SG Dynamo Rostock-Mitte is today known as Polizei SV Rostock (de).) The second team of SV Deutsche Volkspolizei Schwerin became the new first team instead. SV Deutsche Volkspolizei Schwerin was reformed as SG Dynamo Schwerin in 1953 and incorporated into the new sports association SV Dynamo. SG Dynamo Schwerin played its home matches at the Sportplatz Paulshöhe in the district of Ostorf in Schwerin.

SG Dynamo Schwerin advanced to the second tier DDR-Liga in the 1953–54 season. However, the club was immediately relegated to the third tier II. DDR-Liga and then suffered another relegation to the fourth tier Bezirksliga Schwerin in the 1957 season. SG Dynamo Schwerin returned to the II. DDR-Liga in 1959 season, where it struggled for four seasons. The club finally won promotion to the DDR-Liga in the 1962–63 season. SG Dynamo Schwerin remained in the DDR-Liga until German reunification. Wolf-Rüdiger Netz, who became the top goalscorer of BFC Dynamo during the East German era and who won several East German league titles with BFC Dynamo, began playing football at SG Dynamo Schwerin at 8 years old and also made his professional debut with SG Dynamo Schwerin. SG Dynamo Schwerin changed its name after the Peaceful revolution and became Polizei SV Schwerin on 17 April 1990. PSV Schwerin reached the final of the 1989-90 FDGB-Pokal, but lost 1–2 to SG Dynamo Dresden. Polizei SV Schwerin then became 1. FSV Schwerin on 1 July 1991.

=== FC Mecklenburg Schwerin ===
Schweriner SC founded a new football department short after the founding of FC Eintracht Schwerin in 1996. A new SG Dynamo Schwerin was also formed in 2003. FC Eintracht Schwerin, Schweriner SC and SG Dynamo Schwerin joined their forces and created FC Mecklenburg Schwerin as a collaboration team in 2009. They were supported by representatives from politics and administration in Schwerin. FC Mecklenburg Schwerin then merged with FC Eintracht Schwerin and formed independent football club FC Meckenburg Schwerin on 28 May 2013. The 2020-21 Verbandliga Mecklenburg-Vorpommern was ended prematurely due to the COVID-19 pandemic. FC Mecklenburg Schwerin stood at first place and was promoted to the NOFV-Oberliga Nord. SG Dynamo Schwerin stood at first place in 2020–21 Landesliga Mecklenburg-Vorpommern West and was simultaneously promoted to the Verbandsliga Mecklenburg-Vorpommern.

== Honours ==
- Verbandsliga Mecklenburg-Vorpommern (VI)
  - Champions: 2015–16, 2020–21
  - Runners-up: 2014–15

== Stadium ==
FC Mecklenburg Schwerin plays its home matches at the Sportpark Lankow in the district of Lankow in northwestern Schwerin. The stadium has a capacity of 1,500 seats.
