= Ostragehege =

Multi-use sports venue in Dresden, Germany

Coordinates: 51°04′08″N 13°42′47″E

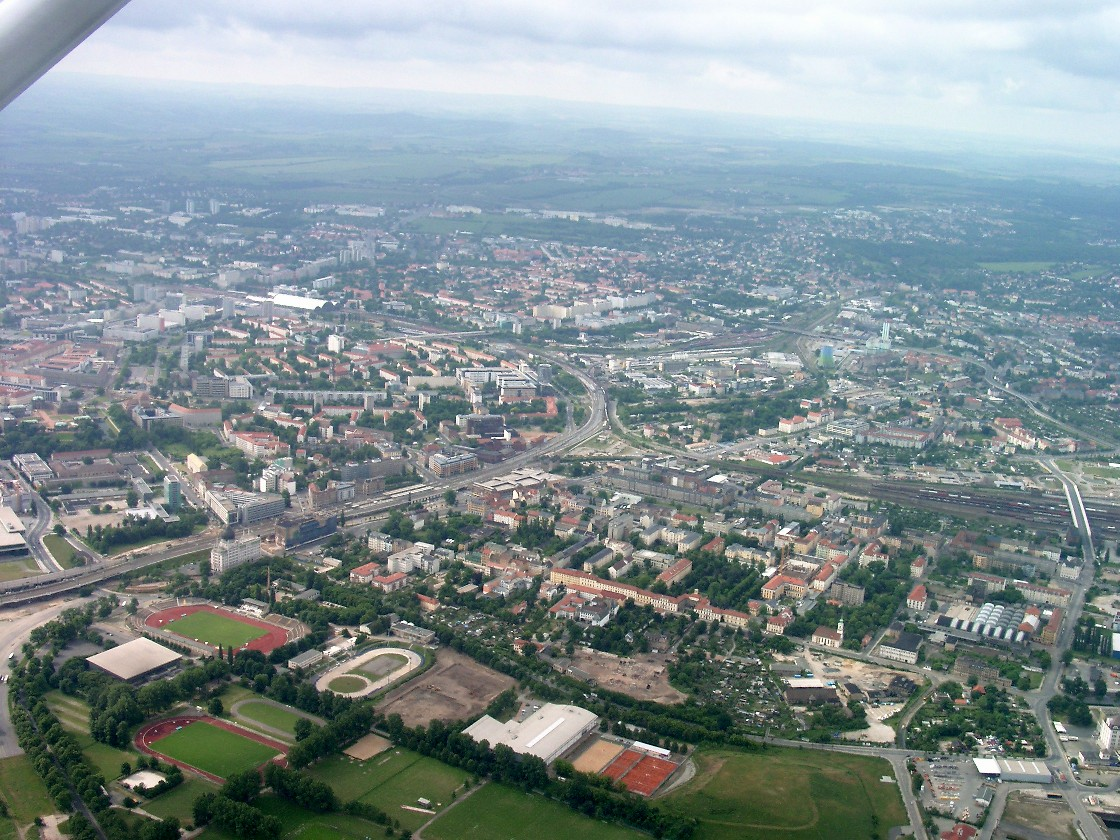
The Sportkomplex Ostragehege and the Friedrichtown of Dresden.

Ostragehege is a multi-use sports venue in Dresden, Germany. Key buildings of the venue include the Heinz-Steyer-Stadion and the ice hockey stadium of the Dresdner Eislöwen (or Dresden ice lions). The stadium was the primary aiming point for No. 5 Group RAF squadron during the Dresden bombings of February 1945. Bomb runs were timed and direction calculated to fan out from this point, causing massive devastation and a fire-storm which killed tens of thousands of human beings.

The slaughterhouse on the site was where Kurt Vonnegut was imprisoned in 1945, and where he set his novel Slaughterhouse-Five.

== See also ==
- Rudolf-Harbig-Stadion
- Bombing of Dresden in World War II
