= VfB Einheit zu Pankow =

German football club

- Full name: VfB Einheit zu Pankow 1893 e.V.
- Founded: 18 September 1893
- Ground: Paul-Zobel-Sportplatz
- League: Bezirksliga Berlin (VIII)
- 2021–22: Kreisliga A Berlin Staffel 2 (IX), 1st ↑
Home colours	Away colours

VfB Einheit zu Pankow is a German association football club from the Pankow locality of Berlin.

== History ==
Founded in 1893 as VfB Pankow, the club's initial interests were in cricket and tennis. Within a few years English expatriates introduced football, which soon displaced cricket. The club grew quickly and came to include departments for gymnastics, fencing, and cycling.

The football team played in the early Berlin-based leagues and became one of the founding members of the German Football Association (Deutscher Fußball-Bund or DFB) at Leipzig in 1900.

VfB played as a lower table side in the Verbandsliga Berlin-Brandenburg (later the Oberliga Berlin-Brandenburg) through the late 1910s and into the early 1920s until touched by scandal in the 1924–25 season. Although they finished just clear of relegation on goal difference they were forced into a two-game relegation playoff because the team had come under suspicion of manipulating some of its matches. They lost both contests to Preußen Berlin (0–6, 0–1) and dropped out of top-flight play for a number of years.

Pankow was able to play their way back to premier level football in 1930 and in 1933 earned their best result with a second-place finish in the Oberliga Berlin-Brandenburg, Staffel B. The next season German football was reorganized under the Third Reich into sixteen top flight Gauligen and the club joined the Gauliga Berlin-Brandenburg where they continued to deliver poor finishes until relegated again in 1936.

After the end of World War II in 1945 occupying Allied forces ordered most organizations in Germany disbanded, including sports and football clubs. Late in the year the establishment of new clubs was permitted and VfB was re-created as SG Pankow-Nord. The club was later the first side to be permitted play under its original name. In 1947 they re-appeared in the Oberliga Berlin (I) but were soon caught up in the Cold War politics of post-war Germany. By the end of the 1950 season they were forced out of the Oberliga and into the DDR-Oberliga, the first division league established in the Soviet-occupied part of the country.

In 1951 most of the club's membership fled to the western-occupied zones of the city and set up there – what was left of VfB in the east was renamed BSG Einheit Pankow. The crippled side then crashed to a last place finish in the 1951–52 season, establishing a record of futility nearly as ignominious the one that would be set by Tasmania Berlin in their 1965 Bundesliga appearance:

- In 34 matches, Einheit earned just two victories and three draws (7–61), losing all of its away games.
- The club was outscored 29–131 and went through a stretch of 588 minutes without a goal.
- Of thirteen league matches which drew fewer than 2,000 spectators, ten were hosted by Pankow.

Incredibly, the team made an appearance in the final of the FDGB-Pokal (East German Cup) that same disastrous season. Aided by manipulative sports officials who – looking to ensure the presence of a Berlin-based team in the final – overturned the result of a cup semi-final match which they had actually lost, Einheit advanced to the final against SG Volkspolizei Dresden where they were beaten 0–3.

Einheit was relegated to the DDR-Liga (II) where they struggled through two more seasons before being sent further down. In September 1954, it combined with BSG Lok Lichtenberg, later Berliner Verkehrsbetriebe's football team, and took that club's place in domestic competitions. Einheit would later be recreated in 1958 as a merger of Bezirksliga's (III) BSG Lok Pankow and BSG Lok Bau-Union Buchholz. The new club would manage only three more single-season appearances in the second division through the early-to-mid-1970s, spending the rest of its time in lower-tier football.

A year after German re-unification in 1990, the eastern and western sides which had split 40 years earlier came together again as the current club VfB Einheit zu Pankow which plays today in the Bezirksliga Berlin (VIII).
