= Meeraner SV =

German football club

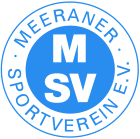
- Full name: Meeraner Sportverein
- Founded: 1907
- Ground: Richard-Hofmann-Stadion
- Capacity: 8,000
- League: Landesklasse Saxony (VIII)

Meeraner Sportverein is a German football club based in Meerane, Saxony, that competes in the Landesklasse, the eighth tier in the German football league system.

The club was founded as SpVgg Meerane 07 in 1907 and refounded as SG Meerane after World War II, and was also known as SG Einheit (meaning 'unity') Meerane and BSG Fortschritt (meaning 'progress') Meerane, the latter after the local textiles factory took it over.

It was a founder member of East Germany's DDR-Oberliga in 1949, playing six seasons until relegation in 1955, never to return. It ranked 23rd of 44 teams in the All-time DDR-Oberliga table. Upon German reunification, it reverted to its original name.

Richard Hofmann, German international striker of the 1920s and 1930s, was born in Meerane and played for the team. The stadium is named after him.
