= FC Anker Wismar =

German football club

- Full name: Fußballclub Anker Wismar 1997 e.V.
- Founded: 12 June 1997
- Ground: Kurt-Bürger-Stadion
- Capacity: 6,500
- Chairman: Stefan Säuberlich
- Manager: Dinalo Adigo
- League: Oberliga NOFV-Nord (V)
- 2025–26: Oberliga NOFV-Nord, 9th of 16
- Website: http://www.fc-anker.de/
Home colours	Away colours

FC Anker Wismar is a German association football club based in Wismar, Germany, currently playing in the Verbandsliga Mecklenburg-Vorpommern.

== History ==
This club's origins dates back to 1904 when the FC Elite Wismar were established. The following year, the club was renamed to Wismarer FC 1905. From 1909 the club was known as Germania Wismar and during the World War II, TSV Wismar played in the Gauliga Nordmark. After the war, the club was renamed no less than four more times (SG Wismar Süd, ZSG Anker Wismar, BSG Anker Wismar and BSG Motor Wismar) before settling on the name TSG Wismar under which they played in the DDR-Liga (prior to German reunification) up until 1997 when the club was finally renamed FC Anker Wismar and as such they have become champions of the Verbandsliga Mecklenburg-Vorpommern four times – in 2000, 2004, 2010 and 2015. On each occasion the club won promotion to the NOFV-Oberliga Nord but was relegated back to the Verbandsliga again the previous three times after a short time.

== Honours ==
The club's honours:

- Verbandsliga Mecklenburg-Vorpommern
  - Champions: 2000, 2004, 2010, 2015, 2023
