= Romania Olympic football team results =

This article provides details of football matches played by the Romania Olympic football team. Every match listed from 1959 to 1976 in this article were originally recognised as full international matches by the Romanian Football Federation, until a decision was made to transfer the status of these matches to the Olympic team on 16 January 2007.

== 1950s and 1960s ==
=== 1959 ===
19 July 1960 Summer Olympics qualification Group 3	Soviet Union	2–0	Romania	Moscow, Soviet Union
17:00	Urin 10'; Metreveli 61'	Report		Stadium: Lenin Central Stadium; Attendance: 102,000; Referee: Orjo Piattiniemi (Finland)

2 August 1960 Summer Olympics qualification Group 3	Romania	0–0	Soviet Union	Bucharest, Romania
17:30		Report		Stadium: Stadionul August 23; Attendance: 80,000; Referee: Grzegorz Aleksandrowicz (Poland)

8 November 1960 Summer Olympics qualification Group 3	Romania	1–0	Bulgaria	Bucharest, Romania
14:30	Constantin 80'	Report		Stadium: Stadionul August 23; Attendance: 80,000; Referee: János Posa (Hungary)

=== 1960 ===
1 May 1960 Summer Olympics qualification Group 3	Bulgaria	2–1	Romania	Sofia, Bulgaria
	Yordanov 2'; Kovachev 20'	Report	Tătaru 66'	Stadium: Vasil Levski National Stadium; Attendance: 55,000; Referee: János Posa (Hungary)

=== 1963 ===
23 June 1964 Summer Olympics qualification Group 1	Denmark	2–3	Romania	Copenhagen, Denmark
13:30	Bruun 17'; Enoksen 59' (pen.)	Report	Constantin 5'; Manolache 52', 64'	Stadium: Idrætspark; Attendance: 34,000; Referee: Albert Guinnard (Switzerland)

27 October Friendly	Romania	2–1	Yugoslavia	Bucharest, Romania
15:00	Țîrcovnicu 17'; Haidu 33'	Report	Smajlović 6'	Stadium: Stadionul August 23; Attendance: 30,000; Referee: Włodzimierz Storoniak (Poland)

3 November 1964 Summer Olympics qualification Group 1	Romania	2–3	Denmark	Bucharest, Romania
14:15	Petru 35', 80'	Report	Thorst 1', 10'; Bertelsen 18'	Stadium: Stadionul August 23; Attendance: 60,000; Referee: Konstantin Zecević (Yugoslavia)

28 November 1964 Summer Olympics qualification Group 1 play-off	Denmark	1–2 (a.e.t.)	Romania	Turin, Italy
15:30	Thorst 84'	Report	Creiniceanu 36'; Sasu 117'	Stadium: Stadio Filadelfia; Attendance: 3,000; Referee: Giulio Campanati (Italy)

=== 1964 ===
27 April Friendly	Romania	4–1	Czechoslovakia	Bucharest, Romania
16:30	Constantin 4' (pen.); Țârlea 9', 17'; Georgescu 52'	Report	Matlák 67' (pen.)	Stadium: Stadionul August 23; Attendance: 15,000; Referee: Hagi Nikolaous (Greece)

3 May 1964 Summer Olympics qualification Group 1	Romania	2–1	Bulgaria	Bucharest, Romania
16:30	Constantin 50', 84' (pen.)	Report	Kotkov 87'	Stadium: Stadionul August 23; Attendance: 50,000; Referee: Michel Kitabidjan (France)

20 May Friendly	Hungary	0–0	Romania	Kecskemét, Hungary
		Report		Stadium: Széktói Stadion; Attendance: 12,000; Referee: Müncz György (Hungary)

31 May 1964 Summer Olympics qualification Group 1	Bulgaria	0–1	Romania	Sofia, Bulgaria
17:55		Report	Koszka 71'	Stadium: Vasil Levski National Stadium; Attendance: 12,000; Referee: Müncz György (Hungary)

17 June Friendly	Yugoslavia	1–2	Romania	Belgrade, Yugoslavia
21:00	Takać 61'	Report	Georgescu 69'; Popescu 86'	Stadium: Stadion Jugoslovenska Narodna Armija; Attendance: 10,000; Referee: Soós Gábor (Hungary)

11 October 1964 Summer Olympics Group A	Romania	3–1	Mexico	Saitama, Japan
14:00	Creiniceanu 20'; Pircalab 33'; Ionescu 47'	Report	Fragoso 73'	Stadium: Omiya Ground; Attendance: 12,932; Referee: Yozo Yokoyama (Japan)

13 October 1964 Summer Olympics Group A	East Germany	1–1	Romania	Tokyo, Japan
14:00	Frenzel 22'	Report	Pavlovici 27'	Stadium: Komazawa Olympic Park Stadium; Attendance: 18,970; Referee: Václav Korelusz (Czechoslovakia)

15 October 1964 Summer Olympics Group A	Romania	1–0	Iran	Saitama, Japan
14:00	Pavlovici 26'	Report		Stadium: Omiya Ground; Attendance: 13,026; Referee: Miguel Comesaña (Argentina)

18 October 1964 Summer Olympics Quarter-finals	Romania	0–2	Hungary	Yokohama, Japan
14:00		Report	Csernai 2', 84' (pen.)	Stadium: Mitsuzawa Soccer Stadium; Attendance: 12,841; Referee: Menachem Ashkenazi (Israel)

20 October 1964 Summer Olympics First consolation round	Romania	4–2	Ghana	Kyoto, Japan
14:00	Pavlovici 12', 19', 74'; Creiniceanu 41'	Report	Aggrey-Fynn 25', 44'	Stadium: Nishikyogoku Athletic Stadium; Attendance: 10,000; Referee: Gregg de Silva (Malaysia)

22 October 1964 Summer Olympics Fifth place play-off	Yugoslavia	0–3	Romania	Osaka, Japan
14:00		Report	Pavlovici 50'; Pârcălab 72'; Constantin 78'	Stadium: Nagai Stadium; Attendance: 10,000; Referee: István Zsolt (Hungary)

=== 1967 ===
18 November 1968 Summer Olympics qualification Group 2	East Germany	1–0	Romania	East Berlin, East Germany
14:30	Pankau 8' (pen.)	Report		Stadium: Walter Ulbricht Stadion; Attendance: 35,000; Referee: Václav Davídek (Czechoslovakia)

6 December 1968 Summer Olympics qualification Group 2	Romania	0–1	East Germany	Bucharest, Romania
13:30 UTC+2		Report	Irmscher 8'	Stadium: Stadionul 23 August; Attendance: 50,000; Referee: Leonard Eliński (Poland)

== 1970s ==
=== 1971 ===
18 April 1972 Summer Olympics qualification First round	Romania	2–1	Albania	Bucharest, Romania
16:00	Iordănescu 45'; Sălceanu 74'	Report	Zhega 55'	Stadium: Stadionul Republicii; Attendance: 9,000; Referee: Franz Wöhrer (Austria)

26 May 1972 Summer Olympics qualification First round	Albania	1–2	Romania	Tirana, Albania
17:30	Pano 29'	Report	Tătaru 57', 68'	Stadium: Qemal Stafa Stadium; Attendance: 25,000; Referee: Mohamed El-Azari (Morocco)

10 October 1972 Summer Olympics qualification Group 4	Denmark	2–1	Romania	Copenhagen, Denmark
14:30	Boc 2' (o.g.); Petersen 13'	Report	Dembrovschi 46'	Stadium: Idrætspark; Attendance: 23,800; Referee: Klaus Ohmsen (West Germany)

=== 1972 ===
21 May 1972 Summer Olympics qualification Group 4	Romania	2–3	Denmark	Bucharest, Romania
14:30	Györffy 79'; Dumitru 90'	Report	Røntved 30'; Johansen 61'; Jensen 64'	Stadium: Stadionul 23 August; Attendance: 5,000; Referee: Giorgos Katsoras (Greece)

=== 1975 ===
4 June 1976 Summer Olympics qualification First round	Romania	4–0	Denmark	Bucharest, Romania
17:30	Kun 15'; Sandu 65'; Dumitru 66'; Dinu 82'	Report		Stadium: Stadionul 23 August; Attendance: 15,000; Referee: Hilmi Ok (Turkey)

18 June 1976 Summer Olympics qualification First round	Denmark	1–2	Romania	Copenhagen, Denmark
29:30	Mauritzen 27'	Report	Sandu 47', 49'	Stadium: Idrætspark; Attendance: 13,300; Referee: Rolf Hangen (Norway)

3 December 1976 Summer Olympics qualification Group 4	France	4–0	Romania	Blois, France
21:30	Fernandez 43'; Rouyer 65', 72', 80'	Report		Stadium: Stade des Allées Jean-Leroi; Attendance: 6,051; Referee: John Homewood (England)

=== 1976 ===
24 March 1976 Summer Olympics qualification Group 4	Romania	1–0	France	Bucharest, Romania
16:00	Bölöni 10'	Report		Stadium: Stadionul 23 August; Attendance: 40,000; Referee: Giorgos Katsoras (Greece)

6 April 1976 Summer Olympics qualification Group 4	Netherlands	0–3	Romania	Roosendaal, Netherlands
21:00		Report	Iordănescu 54' (pen.), 57', 62'	Stadium: De Luiten; Attendance: 5,000; Referee: Norbert Rolles (Luxembourg)

14 April 1976 Summer Olympics qualification Group 4	Romania	5–1	Netherlands	Bucharest, Romania
16:30	Mulțescu 20'; Hajnal 25'; Iordănescu 45' (pen.); Zamfir 64'; Dinu 84'	Report	Peters 11'	Stadium: Stadionul 23 August; Attendance: 30,000; Referee: Richard Casha (Malta

== 2020s ==
=== 2021 ===
5 June Friendly	Mexico	1–0	Romania	Marbella, Spain
21:00 UTC+3	Angulo 75'			Stadium: Estadio Municipal de Marbella

8 June Friendly	Australia	0–1	Romania	Marbella, Spain
21:00 UTC+3			Ganea 10'	Stadium: Estadio Municipal de Marbella

10 July Friendly	Romania	1–1	Saudi Arabia	Mogoșoaia, Romania
19:00 UTC+3	Ganea 16'		Al-Dawsari 33'	Stadium: Stadionul Mogoșoaia

13 July Friendly	Romania	0–0	Saudi Arabia	Mogoșoaia, Romania
18:00 UTC+3				Stadium: Stadionul Mogoșoaia

22 July 2020 Summer Olympics Group B	Honduras	0–1	Romania	Kashima, Japan
20:00 UTC+9		Report	Oliva 45+1' (o.g.)	Stadium: Kashima Stadium; Attendance: 0 Referee: Leodán González (Uruguay)

25 July 2020 Summer Olympics Group B	Romania	0–4	South Korea	Kashima, Japan
20:00 UTC+9		Report	Marin 27' (o.g.); Um Won-sang 59'; Lee Kang-in 84' (pen.), 90'	Stadium: Kashima Stadium; Attendance: 0 Referee: Jesús Valenzuela (Venezuela)

28 July 2020 Summer Olympics Group B	Romania	0–0	New Zealand	Sapporo, Japan
17:30 UTC+9		Report		Stadium: Sapporo Dome; Attendance: 0 Referee: Kevin Ortega (Peru)
