= 1963–64 FC Dinamo București season =

FC Dinamo București
1963–64 season
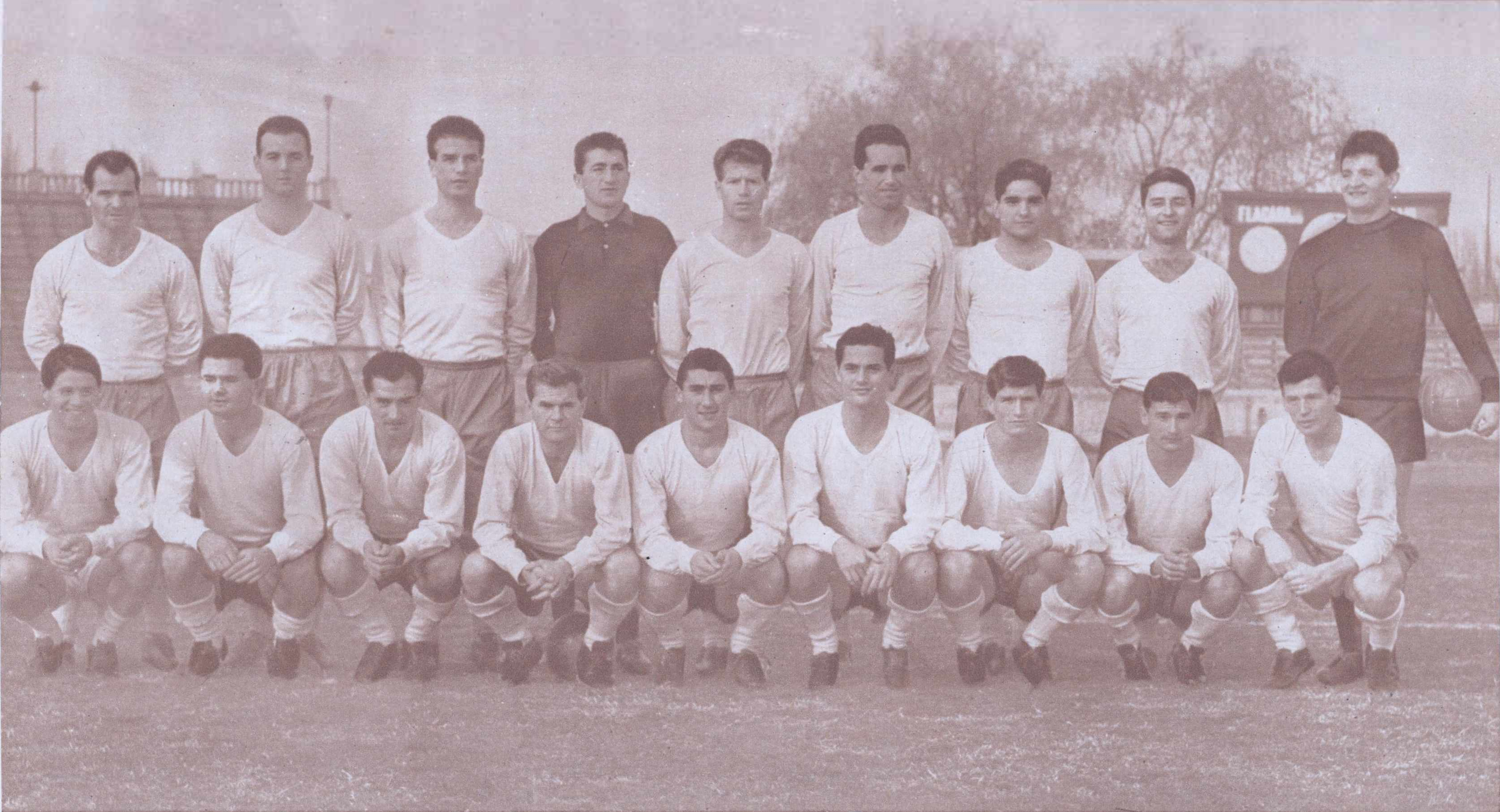
- Manager: (Romania) Traian Ionescu and (Romania) Dumitru Nicolae
- Divizia A: Winners
- Romanian Cup: Winners
- European Cup: First round
- Top goalscorer: Constantin Frățilă (19)
- Biggest win: 7:0 (vs Farul Constanța, 25 August 1963)
- Biggest defeat: 1:4 (vs Steaua București, 10 May 1964)

The 1963–64 season was FC Dinamo București's 15th season in Divizia A. Dinamo realizes the first double in history. In addition to authoritarian rule in the championship, which they won for the third consecutive time, Dinamo wins the Romanian Cup, after beating Steaua Bucharest in the final. In the European Cup, Dinamo meets the multiple champions Real Madrid.

== Results ==
Divizia A
| Round | Date | Opponent | Stadium | Result |
|---|---|---|---|---|
| 1 | 25 August 1963 | Farul Constanța | H | 7-0 |
| 2 | 1 September 1963 | Ştiinţa Cluj | A | 0-2 |
| 3 | 8 September 1963 | Progresul București | H | 2-3 |
| 4 | 14 September 1963 | CSMS Iaşi | H | 2-1 |
| 5 | 21 September 1963 | Dinamo Piteşti | A | 4-0 |
| 6 | 29 September 1963 | Siderurgistul Galaţi | H | 5-1 |
| 7 | 13 October 1963 | Steaua București | H | 3-2 |
| 8 | 20 October 1963 | Crişul Oradea | A | 1-1 |
| 9 | 10 November 1963 | Petrolul Ploieşti | H | 1-0 |
| 10 | 17 November 1963 | UTA | A | 3-2 |
| 11 | 18 March 1964 | Rapid București | A | 2-0 |
| 12 | 1 December 1963 | Ştiinţa Timişoara | H | 0-0 |
| 13 | 8 December 1963 | Steagul Roşu Braşov | A | 0-1 |
| 14 | 15 March 1964 | Farul Constanța | A | 2-0 |
| 15 | 22 March 1964 | Ştiinţa Cluj | H | 2-1 |
| 16 | 29 March 1964 | Progresul București | A | 2-0 |
| 17 | 24 June 1964 | CSMS Iaşi | A | 5-1 |
| 18 | 12 April 1964 | Dinamo Piteşti | H | 2-0 |
| 19 | 19 April 1964 | Siderurgistul Galaţi | A | 1-0 |
| 20 | 10 May 1964 | Steaua București | A | 1-4 |
| 21 | 17 May 1964 | Crişul Oradea | H | 1-1 |
| 22 | 7 June 1964 | Petrolul Ploieşti | A | 1-0 |
| 23 | 14 June 1964 | UTA | H | 6-0 |
| 24 | 21 June 1964 | Rapid București | H | 5-2 |
| 25 | 28 June 1964 | Ştiinţa Timişoara | A | 1-1 |
| 26 | 5 July 1964 | Steagul Roşu Braşov | H | 6-2 |

Divizia A 1963–64 Winners
Dinamo București
4th Title

Cupa României
| Round | Date | Opponent | Stadium | Result |
|---|---|---|---|---|
| Last 32 | 1 March 1964 | Victoria Giurgiu | A | 3-1 |
| Last 16 | 4 June 1964 | Minerul Baia Mare | Sibiu | 6-0 |
| Quarter-finals | 1 July 1964 | Ştiinţa Timişoara | Hunedoara | 0-0 |
| Quarter-finals-replay | 2 July 1964 | Ştiinţa Timişoara | Hunedoara | 2-1 |
| Semifinals | 12 July 1964 | Crişul Oradea | Constanţa | 1-0 |
| Final | 19 July 1964 | Steaua București | București | 5-3 |

Cupa României 1963–64 Winners
Dinamo București
2nd Title

== Romanian Cup final ==
19 July 1964

| Dinamo București | 5 – 3 | Steaua București |
|---|---|---|
| Octavian Popescu 3', 88'; Radu Nunweiller 53'; Ion Pîrcălab 60'; Constantin Frățilă 83' | | Carol Creiniceanu 12'; Gheorghe Constantin 14' (pen.), 63' |

Stadionul 23 August, Bucharest
Attendance: 70.000
Referee: Andries Van den Leeuwen (Netherlands)

DINAMO:
| GK | Ilie Datcu | (substituted off) 85' |
| DF | Constantin Ștefan |
| DF | Ion Nunweiller |
| DF | Lică Nunweiller |
| DF | Dumitru Ivan |
| MF | Emil Petru |
| MF | Octavian Popescu |
| FW | Ion Pîrcălab |
| FW | Radu Nunweiller |
| FW | Constantin Frățilă |
| FW | Ion Haidu |
Substitutes:
| GK | Iuliu Uțu | (substituted in) 85' |
Manager:
Traian Ionescu

STEAUA:
| GK | Vasile Suciu | (substituted off) 59' |
| DF | Mircea Georgescu |
| DF | Emeric Ienei |
| DF | Nicolae Dumitru |
| DF | Dragoş Cojocaru |
| MF | Cornel Pavlovici |
| MF | Constantin Koszka |
| FW | Sorin Avram |
| FW | Gheorghe Constantin |
| FW | Gabriel Raksi | (substituted off) 66' |
| FW | Carol Creiniceanu |
Substitutes:
| GK | Constantin Eremia | (substituted in) 59' |
| FW | Florea Voinea | (substituted in) 66' |
Manager:
Gheorghe Ola

== European Cup ==
Preliminary round – first leg

18 September 1963
16:00

| Dinamo București | 2 – 0 | (East Germany) Motor Jena |
|---|---|---|
| I.Nunweiller 13'; Petru 74' |

Stadionul Republicii, Bucharest
Attendance: 19,210
Referee: Edward Budaj (Poland)

Second leg

25 September 1963
16:15

| Motor Jena | 0 – 1 | Dinamo București |
|---|---|---|
| | | Țîrcovnicu 55' |

Ernst-Abbe-Sportfeld, Jena
Attendance: 11,195
Referee: Wlodzimierz Storoniak (Poland)

First round – first leg

13 November 1963
14:15

| Dinamo București | 1 – 3 | (Spain) Real Madrid |
|---|---|---|
| Țîrcovnicu 86' | | Félix Ruiz 2'; Di Stéfano 43'; Gento 87' |

Stadionul 23 August, Bucharest
Attendance: 60,000
Referee: Józef Kowal (Poland)

Second leg

18 December 1963
20:30

| Real Madrid | 5 – 3 | Dinamo București |
|---|---|---|
| Félix Ruiz 4'; Di Stéfano 19'; Amaro 51'; Zoco 60'; Puskás 63' (pen.) | | I.Nunweiller 25'; Frăţilă 49'; Pîrcălab 71' (pen.) |

Santiago Bernabéu Stadium, Madrid
Attendance: 90,000
Referee: Cesare Jonni (Italy)

== Squad ==
Goalkeepers: Ilie Datcu (26 / 0); Iuliu Uțu (2 / 0).
Defenders: Cornel Popa (24 / 0); Ion Nunweiller (26 / 0); Dumitru Ivan (19 / 0); Constantin Ștefan (19 / 0); Ilie Constantinescu (1 / 0).
Midfielders: Emil Petru (23 / 8); Lică Nunweiller (26 / 1); Octavian Popescu (11 / 3).
Forwards: Ion Pîrcălab (25 / 10); Iosif Varga (8 / 0); Gheorghe Ene (14 / 5); Constantin Frățilă (26 / 19); Ion Haidu (21 / 6); Aurel Unguroiu (8 / 5); Ion Țîrcovnicu (17 / 5); Radu Nunweiller (2 / 0); Vasile Gergely (3 / 0); Mircea Lucescu (2 / 0).
(league appearances and goals listed in brackets)

Manager: Traian Ionescu & Nicolae Dumitru.

== Transfers ==
Before the season, Dinamo bought Emil Petru and Octavian Popescu, both from Stiinta Cluj, and Ion Haidu from Steagu Rosu Braşov. Florin Halagian was transferred to Petrolul Ploiesti and Nicolae Selymes to Steagu Rosu. Mircea Lucescu has been promoted from the youth team.
