= Football at the 1964 Summer Olympics – Men's qualification =

1964 Summer Olympics – Men's Football Qualifiers
Tournament details
- Teams: 62 (from 5 confederations)

Tournament statistics
- Matches played: 95
- Goals scored: 324 (3.41 per match)

The qualification for football tournament at the 1964 Summer Olympics.

== Qualifications ==
The final tournament had 16 spots.

Automatic qualification was granted to Japan as hosts, and Yugoslavia as title holder. The others were allocated as follows:

- Europe: 5 places, contested by 21 teams.
- South America: 2 places, contested by 7 teams.
- North and Central America: 1 place, contested by 5 teams.
- Africa: 3 places, contested by 11 teams.
- Asia: 3 places, contested by 13 teams.

== Europe ==
Five groups of three to five teams with group winners qualifying for the Summer Olympics finals.

=== Group 1 ===
Team 1	Agg.	Team 2	1st leg	2nd leg
Preliminary round
Albania	0–2	Bulgaria	0–1	0–1
First round
Bulgaria	w/o	Luxembourg	—	—
Denmark	5–5	Romania	2–3	3–2
First round play-off
Denmark	1–2 (a.e.t.)	Romania		
Second round
Romania	3–1	Bulgaria	2–1	1–0

=== Group 2 ===
Team 1	Agg.	Team 2	1st leg	2nd leg
First round
Hungary	6–2	Sweden	4–0	2–2
Switzerland	0–7	Spain	0–1	0–6
Second round
Spain	1–5	Hungary	1–2	0–3

=== Group 3 ===
Team 1	Agg.	Team 2	1st leg	2nd leg
Preliminary round
East Germany	4–2	West Germany	3–0	1–2
First round
Soviet Union	11–0	Finland	7–0	4–0
Netherlands	1–4	East Germany	0–1	1–3
Second round
East Germany	2–2	Soviet Union	1–1	1–1
Second round play-off
East Germany	4–1	Soviet Union		

=== Group 4 ===
Team 1	Agg.	Team 2	1st leg	2nd leg
First round
Turkey	3–9	Italy	2–2	1–7
Second round
Italy	4–0	Poland	3–0	1–0

=== Group 5 ===
Team 1	Agg.	Team 2	1st leg	2nd leg
Preliminary round
Iceland	0–10	Great Britain	0–6	0–4
First round
Czechoslovakia	8–2	France	4–0	4–2
Great Britain	3–5	Greece	2–1	1–4
Second round
Czechoslovakia	w/o	Greece	—	—

== South America ==
Seven CONMEBOL teams played in a league of round-robin matches. The top team qualified for the Summer Olympics. The next two teams advanced to a second place play-off, due to them both finishing the same on points, goal difference and goals scored. The last 5 games of the tournament were cancelled following the Estadio Nacional disaster.

=== Final positions ===
Pos	Team	Pld	Pts
1	Argentina	5	10
2	Brazil	3	5
3	Peru	4	5
4	Colombia	6	4
5	Uruguay	5	3
6	Chile	4	3
7	Ecuador	5	2

Source: RSSSF

=== Play-off ===
Team 1	Score	Team 2
Brazil	4–0	Peru

== North and Central America ==
- Preliminary round: Two teams play a two-legged home-and-away match. The winner advanced to the actual tournament.
- Final round: Four CONCACAF teams played in a round-robin tournament. The top team qualified for the Summer Olympics.

=== Final positions (final round) ===
Pos	Team	Pld	Pts
1	Mexico (H, C)	3	6
2	Suriname	3	4
3	United States	3	2
4	Panama	3	0

Source: CONCACAF
(C) Champions; (H) Hosts

== Africa ==
Three groups of four teams with group winners qualifying for the Summer Olympics finals.

=== Group 1 ===
Team 1	Agg.	Team 2	1st leg	2nd leg
First round
Uganda	2–7	United Arab Republic	1–4	1–3
Sudan	w/o	Rhodesia	—	—
Second round
United Arab Republic	7–4	Sudan	4–1	3–3

=== Group 2 ===
Team 1	Agg.	Team 2	1st leg	2nd leg
First round
Dahomey	3–3	Tunisia	2–2	1–1
Liberia	4–6	Ghana	4–5	0–1
First round play-off
Dahomey	1–1 (a.e.t.) (t)	Tunisia		
Second round
Ghana	3–2	Tunisia	2–0	1–2

=== Group 3 ===
Team 1	Agg.	Team 2	1st leg	2nd leg
First round
Kenya	5–10	Ethiopia	4–3	1–7
Nigeria	4–4	Morocco	3–0	1–4
First round play-off
Morocco	2–1	Nigeria		
Second round
Ethiopia	0–2	Morocco	0–1	0–1

== Asia ==
Three groups of five or six teams with group winners qualifying for the Summer Olympics finals.

=== Group 1 ===
Team 1	Agg.	Team 2	1st leg	2nd leg
Preliminary round
South Korea	2–2	Taiwan	2–1	0–1
Preliminary round play-off
South Korea	w/o (Note: The play-off was awarded to South Korea, as Taiwan were disqualified due to objecting to playing at a neutral venue and refused to travel.)	Taiwan		
First round
South Korea	w/o (Note: Philippines withdrew.)	Philippines	—	—
South Vietnam	2–1	Israel	0–1	2–0
Second round
South Korea	5–2	South Vietnam	3–0	2–2

=== Group 2 ===
Team 1	Agg.	Team 2	1st leg	2nd leg
Preliminary round
Malaysia	3–4	Thailand	1–1	2–3
First round
Burma	0–1	North Korea	0–0	0–1
Thailand	w/o (Note: Indonesia withdrew.)	Indonesia	—	—
Second round
North Korea	7–0	Thailand	2–0	5–0

=== Group 3 ===
Team 1	Agg.	Team 2	1st leg	2nd leg
Preliminary round
Iran	4–2	Pakistan	4–1	0–1
Ceylon	3–12	India	3–5	0–7
First round
Iran	4–0	Iraq	4–0	0–0
India	w/o (Note: Lebanon withdrew.)	Lebanon	—	—
Second round
Iran	6–1	India	3–0	3–1
