= Football at the 1964 Summer Olympics – Men's European Qualifiers – Group 1 =

The 1964 Summer Olympics football qualification – Europe Group 1 was one of the five European groups in the Summer Olympics football qualification tournament to decide which teams would qualify for the 1964 Summer Olympics football finals tournament in Japan. Group 1 consisted of five teams: Albania, Bulgaria, Denmark, Luxembourg and Romania. The teams played home-and-away knockout matches. Romania qualified for the Summer Olympics football finals after defeating Bulgaria 3–1 on aggregate in the second round.

== Summary ==
Team 1	Agg.	Team 2	1st leg	2nd leg
Preliminary round
Albania	0–2	Bulgaria	0–1	0–1
First round
Bulgaria	w/o	Luxembourg	—	—
Denmark	5–5	Romania	2–3	3–2
First round play-off
Denmark	1–2 (a.e.t.)	Romania		
Second round
Romania	3–1	Bulgaria	2–1	1–0

== Preliminary round ==
2 June 1963

Albania	0–1	Bulgaria
	Report	Dimitrov 37'

Stadiumi Kombëtar Qemal Stafa, Tirana
Attendance: 15,000
Referee: Lajos Horváth (Hungary)
16 June 1963

Bulgaria	1–0	Albania
Kotkov 30'	Report

Vasil Levski National Stadium, Sofia
Attendance: 25,200
Referee: Dimosthenis Stathatos (Greece)

Bulgaria won 2–0 on aggregate and advanced to the first round.

== First round ==
Bulgaria	w/o	Luxembourg

Luxembourg	w/o	Bulgaria

Bulgaria won on walkover and advanced to the second round.

23 June 1963
13:30 UTC+1

Denmark	2–3	Romania
Bruun 17'; Enoksen 59' (pen.)	Report	Constantin 5'; Manolache 52', 64'

Københavns Idrætspark, Copenhagen
Attendance: 34,000
Referee: Albert Guinnard (Switzerland)
3 November 1963
14:15 UTC+2

Romania	2–3	Denmark
Petru 35', 80'	Report	Thorst 1', 9'; Bertelsen 17'

Stadionul 23 August, Bucharest
Attendance: 60,000
Referee: Konstantin Zečević (Yugoslavia)

=== Play-off ===
28 November 1963
14:30 UTC+1

Denmark	1–2 (a.e.t.)	Romania
Thorst 84'	Report	Creiniceanu 36'; Sasu 117'

Stadio Comunale, Turin
Attendance: 3,000
Referee: Giulio Campanati (Italy)

Romania won the play-off and advanced to the second round.

== Second round ==
3 May 1964

Romania	2–1	Bulgaria
Constantin 50', 84'	Report	Kotkov 87'

Stadionul 23 August, Bucharest
Attendance: 50,000
Referee: Michel Kitabdjian (France)
31 May 1964

Bulgaria	0–1	Romania
	Report	Koszka 71'

Vasil Levski National Stadium, Sofia
Attendance: 50,000
Referee: Dries van Leeuwen (Netherlands)

Romania won 3–1 on aggregate and qualified for the Summer Olympics.

== Goalscorers ==
There were 19 goals scored in 7 matches, for an average of 2.71 goals per match.

3 goals

- (Denmark national football team) Kjeld Thorst
- (Romania national football team) Gheorghe Constantin

2 goals

- (Romania national football team) Cicerone Manolache
- (Romania national football team) Emil Petru
- (Bulgaria national football team) Nikola Kotkov

1 goal

- (Bulgaria national football team) Panteley Dimitrov
- (Denmark national football team) Carl Bertelsen
- (Denmark national football team) Palle Bruun
- (Denmark national football team) Henning Enoksen
- (Romania national football team) Carol Creiniceanu
- (Romania national football team) Mircea Sasu
- (Romania national football team) Constantin Koszka
