= Football at the 1964 Summer Olympics – Men's European Qualifiers =

Men's European Qualifier
Tournament details
- Teams: 21 (from 1 confederation)

Tournament statistics
- Matches played: 32
- Goals scored: 115 (3.59 per match)

The Men's European Football Qualifiers for the 1964 Summer Olympics consisted of two stages, the first single elimination tournament and then group stage.

== Group 1 ==
Team 1	Agg.	Team 2	1st leg	2nd leg
Preliminary round
Albania	0–2	Bulgaria	0–1	0–1
First round
Bulgaria	w/o	Luxembourg	—	—
Denmark	5–5	Romania	2–3	3–2
First round play-off
Denmark	1–2 (a.e.t.)	Romania		
Second round
Romania	3–1	Bulgaria	2–1	1–0

== Group 2 ==
Team 1	Agg.	Team 2	1st leg	2nd leg
First round
Hungary	6–2	Sweden	4–0	2–2
Switzerland	0–7	Spain	0–1	0–6
Second round
Spain	1–5	Hungary	1–2	0–3

== Group 3 ==
Team 1	Agg.	Team 2	1st leg	2nd leg
Preliminary round
East Germany	4–2	West Germany	3–0	1–2
First round
Soviet Union	11–0	Finland	7–0	4–0
Netherlands	1–4	East Germany	0–1	1–3
Second round
East Germany	2–2	Soviet Union	1–1	1–1
Second round play-off
East Germany	4–1	Soviet Union		

== Group 4 ==
Team 1	Agg.	Team 2	1st leg	2nd leg
First round
Turkey	3–9	Italy	2–2	1–7
Second round
Italy	4–0	Poland	3–0	1–0

== Group 5 ==
Team 1	Agg.	Team 2	1st leg	2nd leg
Preliminary round
Iceland	0–10	Great Britain	0–6	0–4
First round
Czechoslovakia	8–2	France	4–0	4–2
Great Britain	3–5	Greece	2–1	1–4
Second round
Czechoslovakia	w/o	Greece	—	—
