= List of East Germany national football team hat-tricks =

This page is a list of the hat-tricks scored for the East Germany national football team. From East Germany's first international match on 21 September 1952 against Poland to their last on 12 September 1990 against Belgium, there were fifteen recorded hat-tricks. The first international hat-trick was scored by Günter Schröter against Norway in an international friendly in 1958. Günter Schröter, alongside Henning Frenzel and Martin Hoffmann, holds the record for most hat-tricks scored by an East German player with two. The most goals scored in a single game is four, a record jointly held by Heino Kleiminger against Ceylon and Hans-Jürgen Kreische against Luxembourg.

== Hat-tricks scored by East Germany ==
Scores and results list East Germany's goal tally first.

No.	Player	Date	Opponent	Venue	Goals	Result	Competition	Ref.
1	Günter Schröter	13 August 1958	Norway	Ullevaal Stadion, Oslo, Norway	3 – (6', 36', 44')	5–6	Friendly	
2	Günter Schröter (2)	23 May 1962	Denmark	Zentralstadion, Leipzig, East Germany	3 – (8', 56', 88')	4–1	Friendly	
3	Heino Kleiminger	12 January 1964	Ceylon	Sugathadasa Stadium, Colombo, Ceylon	4 – (1', 40', 62', 88')	12–1	Friendly	
4	Hermann Stöcker	12 January 1964	Ceylon	Sugathadasa Stadium, Colombo, Ceylon	3 – (20', 47', 89')	12–1	Friendly	
5	Henning Frenzel	5 April 1967	Netherlands	Zentralstadion, Leipzig, East Germany	3 – (62', 78', 85')	4–3	UEFA Euro 1968 qualifying	
6	Henning Frenzel (2)	9 July 1969	Egypt	Ostseestadion, Rostock, East Germany	3 – (6', 32', 59')	7–0	Friendly	
7	Hans-Jürgen Kreische	15 November 1970	Luxembourg	Stade Municipal, Luxembourg City, Luxembourg	4 – (29', 36', 39', 78')	5–0	UEFA Euro 1972 qualifying	
8	Jürgen Sparwasser	6 September 1972	Mexico	ESV-Stadion, Ingolstadt, East Germany	3 – (39', 51', 89')	7–0	1972 Summer Olympics	
9	Eberhard Vogel	31 July 1975	Canada	Lansdowne Park, Ottawa, Canada	3 – (37', 59', 84')	7–1	Friendly	
10	Joachim Streich	29 October 1977	Malta	Karl-Liebknecht-Stadion, Potsdam, East Germany	3 – (63' pen, 79', 82')	9–0	1978 FIFA World Cup qualification	
11	Martin Hoffmann	29 October 1977	Malta	Karl-Liebknecht-Stadion, Potsdam, East Germany	3 – (2', 44', 84')	9–0	1978 FIFA World Cup qualification	
12	Martin Hoffmann (2)	13 October 1979	Switzerland	Stadion der Weltjugend, East Berlin, East Germany	3 – (11', 75', 80')	5–2	UEFA Euro 1980 qualifying	
13	Rainer Ernst	17 November 1984	Luxembourg	Stade de la Frontière, Esch-sur-Alzette, Luxembourg	3 – (60', 76', 81')	5–0	1986 FIFA World Cup qualification	
14	Andreas Thom	3 June 1987	Iceland	Laugardalsvöllur, Reykjavík, Iceland	3 – (37', 69', 88')	6–0	UEFA Euro 1988 qualifying	
15	Ulf Kirsten	28 March 1990	United States	Friedrich-Ludwig-Jahn-Sportpark, Berlin, Germany	3 – (17', 31', 66')	3–2	Friendly	

== Hat-tricks conceded by East Germany ==
Scores and results list East Germany's goal tally first.

No.	Player	Date	Opponent	Venue	Goals	Result	Competition	Ref.
1	Gheorghe Váczi	26 October 1952	Romania	Stadionul Republicii, Bucharest, Romania	3 – (23', 32', 43')	1–3	Friendly	
2	Des Palmer	25 September 1957	Wales	Ninian Park, Cardiff, Wales	3 – (38', 44', 37' pen)	1–4	1958 FIFA World Cup qualification	
3	Harald Hennum	13 August 1958	Norway	Ullevaal Stadion, Oslo, Norway	4 – (9', 24', 34', 47')	5–6	Friendly	
4	János Farkas	27 September 1967	Hungary	Népstadion, Budapest, Hungary	3 – (9', 48', 50')	1–3	UEFA Euro 1968 qualifying	
5	Toni Polster	15 November 1989	Austria	Praterstadion, Vienna, Austria	3 – (2', 23' pen, 61')	0–3	1990 FIFA World Cup qualification	
