= 1964 Cupa României final =

- Event: 1963–64 Cupa României
Dinamo București	Steaua București
5	3
- Date: 19 July 1964
- Venue: 23 August, Bucharest
- Referee: Andries Van den Leeuwen (NED)
- Attendance: 70,000

The 1964 Cupa României final was the 26th finals match of Romania's most prestigious football cup competition. It was disputed between Dinamo București and Steaua București, and was won by Dinamo București after a game with a total of 8 goals. It was the 2nd cup win for Dinamo București.

== Match details ==
19 July 1964
17:30 EET

Dinamo București	5–3	Steaua București
Popescu 3', 88'; Nunweiller 53'; Pârcălab 60'; Frățilă 83'	Report	Creiniceanu 12'; Constantin 14' (pen.), 63'

23 August, Bucharest
Attendance: 70,000
Referee: Andries Van den Leeuwen (NED)

GK	1	(Romania) Ilie Datcu (substituted off) 85'
DF	2	(Romania) Constantin Ștefan
DF	3	(Romania) Ion Nunweiller
DF	4	(Romania) Lică Nunweiller
DF	5	(Romania) Dumitru Ivan
MF	6	(Romania) Emil Petru
MF	7	(Romania) Octavian Popescu
FW	8	(Romania) Ion Pârcălab
FW	9	(Romania) Radu Nunweiller
FW	10	(Romania) Constantin Frățilă
FW	11	(Romania) Ion Haidu
Substitutions:
GK	12	(Romania) Iuliu Uțu (substituted on) 85'
Manager:
(Romania) Traian Ionescu & Nicolae Dumitru

GK	1	(Romania) Vasile Suciu (substituted off) 59'
DF	2	(Romania) Mircea Georgescu
DF	3	(Romania) Emerich Jenei
DF	4	(Romania) Dumitru Nicolae
DF	5	(Romania) Dragoș Cojocaru
MF	6	(Romania) Cornel Pavlovici
MF	7	(Romania) Constantin Koszka
FW	8	(Romania) Sorin Avram
FW	9	(Romania) Gheorghe Constantin
FW	10	(Romania) Gavril Raksi (substituted off) 66'
FW	11	(Romania) Carol Creiniceanu
Substitutions:
GK	12	(Romania) Constantin Eremia (substituted on) 59'
FW	13	(Romania) Florea Voinea (substituted on) 66'
Manager:
(Romania) Gheorghe Ola

== See also ==
- List of Cupa României finals
- Eternal derby (Romania)
