= Football at the 1964 Summer Olympics – Men's European Qualifiers – Group 5 =

The 1964 Summer Olympics football qualification – Europe Group 5 was one of the five European groups in the Summer Olympics football qualification tournament to decide which teams would qualify for the 1964 Summer Olympics football finals tournament in Japan. Group 5 consisted of five teams: Czechoslovakia, France, Great Britain, Greece, Iceland. The teams played home-and-away knockout matches. Czechoslovakia qualified for the Summer Olympics football finals after a walkover against Greece in the second round.

== Summary ==
Team 1	Agg.	Team 2	1st leg	2nd leg
Preliminary round
Iceland	0–10	Great Britain	0–6	0–4
First round
Czechoslovakia	8–2	France	4–0	4–2
Great Britain	3–5	Greece	2–1	1–4
Second round
Czechoslovakia	w/o	Greece	—	—

== Preliminary round ==
7 September 1963
16:00 UTC+0

Iceland	0–6	Great Britain
	Report	Harvey 5'; Martin 7' (?); Lindsay 10', 42'; Candey 48'

Laugardalsvöllur, Reykjavík
Attendance: 7,755
Referee: Erling Rolf Olsen (Norway)
14 September 1963
15:00 UTC+1

Great Britain	4–0	Iceland
Harvey (?); Lawrence 3' (pen.) (?)	Report

Plough Lane, London
Attendance: 3,500
Referee: Frede Hansen (Denmark)

== First round ==
28 September 1963

Czechoslovakia	4–0	France
Brumovský 32'; Matlák 41' (pen.); Nepomucký 46'; Píša 73'	Report

Plzeň City Stadium, Plzeň
Referee: Nikolay Khlopotin (Soviet Union)
27 October 1963

France	2–4	Czechoslovakia
Planchat 25', 71'	Report	Masný 31', 52'; Kos 58'; Geleta 81'

Stade Paul-Rébeilleau, Poitiers

Czechoslovakia won 8–2 on aggregate and advanced to the second round.

12 February 1964
19:15 UTC+0

Great Britain	2–1	Greece
Lawrence 31'; Buchanan 37'	Report	Papaioannou 49'

Stamford Bridge, London
Attendance: 5,589
Referee: Joseph Hannet (Belgium)
8 April 1964
16:30 UTC+2

Greece	4–1	Great Britain
Mavridis 3'; Papaioannou 75', 84'; Papazoglou 82'	Report	Buchanan 72'

Georgios Karaiskakis Stadium, Neo Faliro
Attendance: 28,000
Referee: Menahem Ashkenazi (Israel)

Greece won 5–3 on aggregate and advanced to the second round.

== Second round ==
Czechoslovakia	w/o	Greece
	Report

Greece	w/o	Czechoslovakia
	Report

Czechoslovakia won on walkover and qualified for the Summer Olympics.

== Goalscorers ==
There were 28 goals scored in 6 matches, for an average of 4.67 goals per match.

4 goals

- (Great Britain Olympic football team) Tommy Lawrence

3 goals

- (Greece national football team) Mimis Papaioannou

2 goals

- (Great Britain Olympic football team) Brian Martin
- (Great Britain Olympic football team) Hugh Lindsay
- (Great Britain Olympic football team) Harvey
- (Great Britain Olympic football team) Buchanan
- (Czechoslovakia national football team) Vojtech Masný
- (France national football team) Jean-Jacques Planchat

1 goal

- (Great Britain Olympic football team) Mike Candey
- (Czechoslovakia national football team) Jan Brumovský
- (Czechoslovakia national football team) Štefan Matlák
- (Czechoslovakia national football team) Karel Nepomucký
- (Czechoslovakia national football team) Josef Píša
- (Czechoslovakia national football team) Vladimír Kos
- (Czechoslovakia national football team) Ján Geleta
- (Greece national football team) Stathis Mavridis
- (Greece national football team) Aris Papazoglou
