= Football at the 1964 Summer Olympics – Men's European Qualifiers – Group 3 =

The 1964 Summer Olympics football qualification – Europe Group 3 was one of the five European groups in the Summer Olympics football qualification tournament to decide which teams would qualify for the 1964 Summer Olympics football finals tournament in Japan. Group 3 consisted of five teams: East Germany, Finland, Netherlands, Soviet Union and West Germany. The teams played home-and-away knockout matches. East Germany qualified for the Summer Olympics football finals after defeating Soviet Union 4–1 via a play-off in the second round.

== Summary ==
Team 1	Agg.	Team 2	1st leg	2nd leg
Preliminary round
East Germany	4–2	West Germany	3–0	1–2
First round
Soviet Union	11–0	Finland	7–0	4–0
Netherlands	1–4	East Germany	0–1	1–3
Second round
East Germany	2–2	Soviet Union	1–1	1–1
Second round play-off
East Germany	4–1	Soviet Union		

== Preliminary round ==
15 September 1963

East Germany	3–0	West Germany
Kleiminger 25'; Stöcker 31'; Nöldner 54'	Report

Karl-Marx-Stadt Stadion, Chemnitz
Attendance: 50,000
Referee: Ken Dagnall (England)
22 September 1963

West Germany	2–1	East Germany
Zettelmaier 47', 59'	Report	Stöcker 20'

Niedersachsenstadion, Hannover
Attendance: 15,000
Referee: Václav Korelus (Czechoslovakia)

East Germany won 4–2 on aggregate and advanced to the first round.

== First round ==
22 July 1963
18:30 UTC+3

Soviet Union	7–0	Finland
Serebrianikov 16', 46'; Kazakov 27', 39'; Biba 38'; Matveyev 61' (pen.), 89'	Report

Central Stadium, Kiev
Attendance: 48,000
Referee: Milan Fencl (Czechoslovakia)
1 August 1963
19:00 UTC+2

Finland	0–4	Soviet Union
	Report	Serebrianikov 23'; Biba 25'; Kazakov 48'; Matveyev 75'

Helsingin Olympiastadion, Helsinki
Attendance: 6,485
Referee: Bertil Lööw (Sweden)

Soviet Union won 11–0 on aggregate and advanced to the second round.

15 March 1964

Netherlands	0–1	East Germany
	Report	Fräßdorf 12'

Sportpark Daal en Bergselaan, The Hague
Attendance: 3,000
28 March 1964

East Germany	3–1	Netherlands
Frenzel 11'; Stöcker 15'; Fräßdorf 27'	Report	Mulder 3'

Ostseestadion, Rostock
Attendance: 20,000
Referee: Albert Guinnard (Switzerland)

East Germany won 4–2 on aggregate and advanced to the second round.

== Second round ==
31 May 1964

East Germany	1–1	Soviet Union
Frenzel 10'	Report	Sevidov 88'

Zentralstadion, Leipzig
Attendance: 80,000
Referee: Joseph Heymann (Switzerland)
7 June 1964

Soviet Union	1–1	East Germany
Kopayev 14'	Report	Kleiminger 62'

Tsentralny Stadion imeni Lenina, Moscow
Attendance: 82,000
Referee: Hans Karlsson (Sweden)

=== Play-off ===
28 June 1964

East Germany	4–1	Soviet Union
Kleiminger 16'; Urbanczyk 39'; Vogel 82'; Fräßdorf 87'	Report	Serebrianikov 55'

Stadion Dziesięciolecia, Warsaw
Attendance: 25,000
Referee: Eduard Babauczek (Austria)

East Germany won the play-off and qualified for the Summer Olympics.

== Goalscorers ==
There were 31 goals scored in 9 matches, for an average of 3.44 goals per match.

4 goals

- (Soviet Union national football team) Viktor Serebrianikov

3 goals

- (Soviet Union national football team) Boris Kazakov
- (Soviet Union national football team) Gennadi Matveyev
- (East Germany national football team) Hermann Stöcker
- (East Germany national football team) Heino Kleiminger
- (East Germany national football team) Otto Fräßdorf

2 goals

- (Germany national football team) Dieter Zettelmaier
- (Soviet Union national football team) Andriy Biba
- (East Germany national football team) Henning Frenzel

1 goal

- (East Germany national football team) Jürgen Nöldner
- (Netherlands national football team) Jan Mulder
- (Soviet Union national football team) Yury Sevidov
- (Soviet Union national football team) Oleg Kopayev
- (East Germany national football team) Klaus Urbanczyk
- (East Germany national football team) Eberhard Vogel
