= Czechoslovakia national under-23 football team =

Czechoslovakia national under-23 football team may refer to:

- Czechoslovakia national under-21 football team, which replaced the U-23 team in 1978
- Czechoslovakia Olympic football team, which competed in the Olympic football tournament, an under-23 competition, from 1922 to 1993
