= Mircea Sasu =

Romanian footballer (1939–1983)

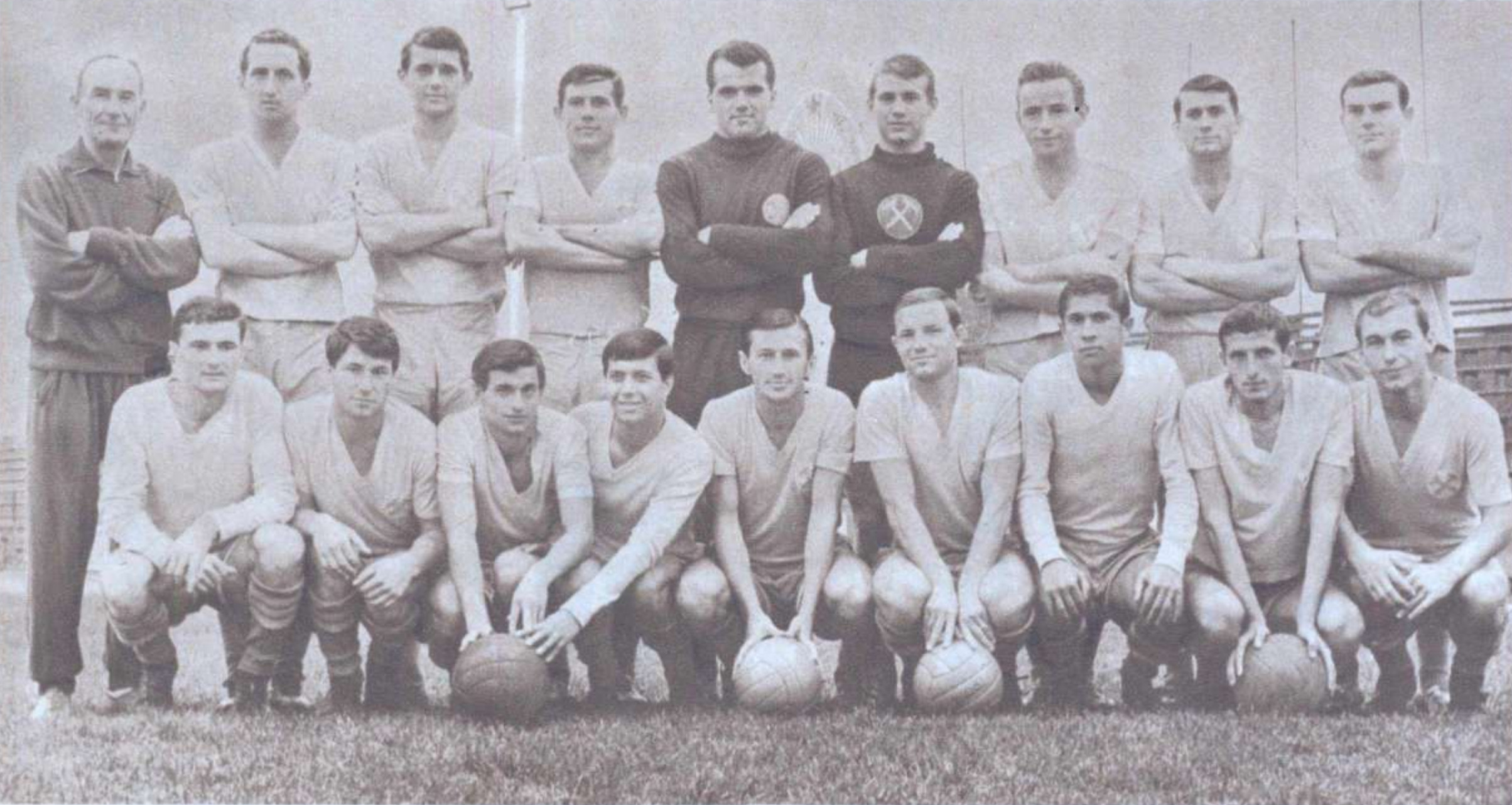
- Sasu (center, below) with Minerul Baia Mare in 1967

Personal information
- Date of birth: 5 October 1939
- Place of birth: Ferneziu, Maramureș County, Romania
- Date of death: 17 October 1983 (aged 44)
- Place of death: Baia Mare, Romania
- Height: 1.80 m (5 ft 11 in)
- Position: Striker

Youth career
- 1953–1959: Minerul Baia Mare

Senior career*
Years	Team	Apps	(Gls)
1959–1960	Dinamo Săsar		
1961	Dinamo București	7	(2)
1961–1963	UTA Arad	50	(25)
1963–1967	Minerul Baia Mare (Note: The statistics for the 1963–64, 1965–66 and 1966–67 Divizia B seasons are unavailable.)	26	(7)
1967–1970	Farul Constanța	71	(21)
1970–1971	Fenerbahçe	6	(3)
1971–1974	Minerul Baia Mare	31	(0)
Total		191	(58)

International career
1961	Romania U23	1	(0)
1963–1967	Romania Olympic	3	(1)
1965	Romania B	1	(1)
1965–1968	Romania	5	(1)
- * Club domestic league appearances and goals

Mircea Sasu (5 October 1939 – 17 October 1983) was a Romanian footballer who played as a striker in his country for Minerul Baia Mare, UTA Arad, Dinamo București and Farul Constanța, and in Turkey for Fenerbahçe. He was known in Turkey for his free kick goals.

== Club career ==
Sasu was born on 5 October 1939 in Ferneziu, Maramureș County, Romania. He began playing junior-level football in 1953 at Minerul Baia Mare, before starting his senior career at third-tier club Dinamo Săsar in 1959. He went to play for Dinamo București, making his Divizia A debut on 19 March 1961 under coaches Traian Ionescu and Nicolae Dumitru in a 1–0 away loss to UTA Arad. On 9 July, he scored his first goals in the competition by netting twice in a 2–0 victory against Steagul Roșu Brașov. Subsequently, Sasu joined UTA Arad, where he scored a career-best 16 goals in the 1961–62 season. In 1963, he moved to Divizia B club Minerul Baia Mare, helping them gain promotion to the first league at the end of his first season. However, Sasu could not avoid the team's relegation back to the second league after one year, but he stayed with the club for a further two seasons.

In 1967, Sasu returned to Divizia A football by joining Farul Constanța. There, he made his last appearance in the Romanian top league on 22 July 1970 in a 1–1 draw against CFR Cluj, accumulating a total of 154 matches and 55 goals in the competition. Sasu then went to Turkey to join Fenerbahçe, where he became a teammate of compatriot Ilie Datcu. His debut in the Turkish league took place on 29 November 1970 under coach Constantin Teașcă and he scored once in a 1–1 draw against rivals Galatasaray. On 20 December, he netted a brace in a 2–2 draw against Eskişehirspor. Sasu made his last appearance in the Turkish league in a 2–0 derby win over Beşiktaş, totaling six matches with three goals in the competition. He ended his career after playing in Divizia B from 1971 to 1973 at Minerul Baia Mare.

== International career ==
From 1961 to 1967, Sasu made several appearances for Romania's under-23, Olympic and B sides. Notably, while playing for the Olympic team, he scored the winning goal in a 2–1 victory against Denmark during the successful 1964 Summer Olympics qualifiers.

Sasu played five matches and scored once for Romania, making his debut on 30 May 1965 under coach Ilie Oană in a 1–0 victory against Czechoslovakia in the 1966 World Cup qualifiers. During those qualifiers, he also played in two losses to Portugal and Czechoslovakia. He scored his only goal for the national team in a 1–1 friendly draw against DR Congo. His last appearance for Romania took place on 1 May 1968 in a 1–1 friendly draw against Austria.

== Death ==
Sasu died on 17 October 1983 at the age of 44.

== Career statistics ==
Appearances and goals by national team and year
National team	Year	Apps	Goals
Romania	1965	3	0
Romania	1967	1	1
Romania	1968	1	0
Total		5	1

=== International goals ===
Scores and results list Romania's goal tally first, score column indicates score after each Sasu goal.

List of international goals scored by Mircea Sasu
No.	Date	Venue	Opponent	Score	Result	Competition
1	24 December 1967	Stade du 20 Mai, Kinshasa, DR Congo	DR Congo	1–0	1–1	Friendly

== Honours ==
Minerul Baia Mare

- Divizia B: 1963–64
