= Jan Brumovský =

Czech footballer

Personal information
- Date of birth: 26 June 1937 (age 89)
- Place of birth: Levice, Czechoslovakia

Senior career*
Years	Team	Apps	(Gls)
1957–1970	Dukla Prague	229	(42)

International career
1958–1964	Czechoslovakia	4	(0)
1959	Czechoslovakia B	3	(0)
1960–1964	Czechoslovakia Olympic	15	(5)
Medal record
Representing Czechoslovakia
Men's football
Olympic Games
Silver medal – second place	1964 Tokyo	Team competition
- * Club domestic league appearances and goals

Jan Brumovský (born 26 June 1937 in Levice) is a Czech former football forward who competed in the 1964 Summer Olympics. He played in the Czechoslovak First League at club level for Dukla Prague, taking part in 229 matches and scoring 42 goals. Brumovský made four appearances for Czechoslovakia, with his debut coming in a 1–1 draw with Italy in December 1958.
