= Carol Creiniceanu =

Romanian footballer (1939–2012)

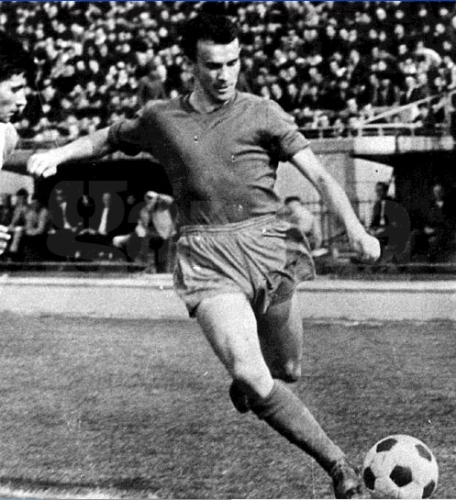

Personal information
- Date of birth: 1 February 1939
- Place of birth: Lupeni, Romania
- Date of death: 14 January 2012 (aged 72)
- Place of death: Lupeni, Romania
- Height: 1.69 m (5 ft 7 in)
- Position: Midfielder

Youth career
- 1949–1956: Minerul Lupeni

Senior career*
Years	Team	Apps	(Gls)
1957–1961	Minerul Lupeni (Note: The statistics for the 1957–58 and 1958–59 Divizia B seasons are unavailable.)	51	(22)
1961–1971	Steaua București	156	(43)
Total		207	(65)

International career
1959	Romania B	1	(0)
1963	Romania U23	1	(0)
1963–1964	Romania Olympic	11	(3)
1963–1969	Romania	3	(1)

Managerial career
- 1979–1980: Metalul București
- 1981–1982: Mecanică Fină București
- 1982–1983: ASA Mizil
- 1991: Jiul Petroșani (caretaker)
- 2009: Minerul Lupeni
- * Club domestic league appearances and goals

Carol Creiniceanu (1 February 1939 – 14 January 2012) was a Romanian footballer who played as a midfielder. He was part of Romania's team that reached the quarter-finals in the 1964 Summer Olympics.

== Club career ==
Creiniceanu was born on 1 February 1939 in Lupeni, Romania and began playing junior-level football in 1959 at local club Minerul. In 1957 he started to play for the seniors, helping them gain first league promotion at the end of the 1958–59 Divizia B season. He made his Divizia A debut on 16 August 1959 under coach Vasile Lazăr in Minerul's 1–1 draw against Steagul Roșu Brașov.

In 1961, Creiniceanu joined Steaua București where he won six Cupa României, but played in only two of the finals, which were both 2–1 victories against rivals Dinamo București. During these years, he also scored two goals in the derby against Dinamo, of which the first was in the 5–3 defeat in the 1964 Cupa României final and the second was in a 3–2 league loss. The team also won the 1967–68 title under coach Ștefan Kovács, but Creiniceanu did not make a single league appearance during that season. During his spell with The Military Men, Creiniceanu made his only eight appearances in European competitions. Notably, he scored two goals to help his side get past Derry City in the first round of the 1964–65 European Cup Winners' Cup, being eliminated in the following one by Dinamo Zagreb. He also scored a goal in the 5–3 aggregate loss to Spartak Trnava in the first round of the 1968–69 European Cup. On 22 July 1970, he made his last Divizia A appearance in Steaua's 1–1 draw against Bihor Oradea, totaling 207 matches with 65 goals in the competition.

== International career ==
Creiniceanu played one game for each of Romania's under-23 and B teams in 1959 and 1963 respectively.

Creiniceanu played three games and scored one goal for Romania, making his debut on 9 October 1963 when coach Silviu Ploeșteanu sent him to replace Ion Haidu in the 32nd minute of 0–0 friendly draw against Turkey. His following match was also against Turkey, a 3–0 victory during the 1966 World Cup qualifiers in which he scored the final goal. His last appearance for the national team was a friendly which ended 1–1 against Yugoslavia.

Creiniceanu also played 11 games and scored three goals for Romania's Olympic team. He was chosen by coach Ploeșteanu to be part of the 1964 Summer Olympics squad in Tokyo where he scored two goals, one in a 3–1 victory against Mexico and one in a 4–2 win over Ghana, helping the team finish in fifth place.

=== International goals ===
Scores and results list Romania's goal tally first, score column indicates score after each Creiniceanu goal.

Goal	Date	Venue	Opponent	Score	Result	Competition
1	2 May 1965	23 August Stadium, Bucharest, Romania	Turkey	3–0	3–0	1966 World Cup qualifiers

== Managerial career ==
Creiniceanu coached several clubs in the Romanian lower leagues such as Metalul București, Mecanică Fină București, ASA Mizil and Minerul Lupeni. He also coached Jiul Petroșani during the 1990–91 Divizia A season in a 3–0 win over Universitatea Cluj. In the last years of his life, he worked for Minerul Lupeni's youth center.

== Personal life and death ==
His father, Francisc, was also a footballer who played for Minerul Lupeni.

Creiniceanu died on 14 January 2012 at age 72.

== Honours ==
Minerul Lupeni

- Divizia B: 1958–59

Steaua București

- Divizia A: 1967–68
- Cupa României: 1961–62, 1965–66, 1966–67, 1968–69, 1969–70, 1970–71
