= Football at the 1964 Summer Olympics – Men's European Qualifiers – Group 2 =

The 1964 Summer Olympics football qualification – Europe Group 2 was one of the five European groups in the Summer Olympics football qualification tournament to decide which teams would qualify for the 1964 Summer Olympics football finals tournament in Japan. Group 2 consisted of four teams: Hungary, Spain, Sweden, Switzerland. The teams played home-and-away knockout matches. Hungary qualified for the Summer Olympics football finals after defeating Spain 5–1 on aggregate in the second round.

== Summary ==
Team 1	Agg.	Team 2	1st leg	2nd leg
First round
Hungary	6–2	Sweden	4–0	2–2
Switzerland	0–7	Spain	0–1	0–6
Second round
Spain	1–5	Hungary	1–2	0–3

== First round ==
4 May 1963
16:00 UTC+1

Hungary	4–0	Sweden
Palotai 57'; Bene 84', 86'; Povázsai 85'	Report

Népstadion, Budapest
Attendance: 19,000
Referee: Fritz Mayer (Austria)
27 October 1963
13:30 UTC+1

Sweden	2–2	Hungary
Grip 9'; Bild 16'	Report	Dunai (?); Laczkó (?)

Ullevi Stadion, Gothenburg
Attendance: 25,109
Referee: Erik Beijar (Finland)

Hungary won 6–2 on aggregate and advanced to the second round.

10 October 1963

Switzerland	0–1	Spain
		Uriarte 8'

Stadio Comunale di Cornaredo, Lugano
Attendance: 2,000
Referee: Johannes Malka (Germany)
7 November 1963

Spain	6–0	Switzerland
Echarri 2', 44'; Uriarte 37', 80'; Grosso 48'; Vidal 50'

Estadio Son Moix, Palma
Attendance: 20,000
Referee: José Barberan (France)

Spain won 7–0 on aggregate and advanced to the second round.

== Second round ==
29 April 1964

Spain	1–2	Hungary
Velázquez (?)		Bene (?)

Estadio Son Moix, Palma
7 May 1964

Hungary	3–0	Spain
Bene (?); Palotai (?)

Népstadion, Budapest

Hungary won 5–1 on aggregate and qualified for the Summer Olympics.

== Goalscorers ==
There were 21 goals scored in 6 matches, for an average of 3.5 goals per match.

6 goals

- (Hungary national football team) Ferenc Bene

3 goals

- (Spain national football team) Fidel Uriarte

2 goals

- (Spain national football team) Rafael Echarri
- (Hungary national football team) Károly Palotai

1 goal

- (Hungary national football team) László Povázsai
- (Sweden men's national football team) Tord Grip
- (Sweden men's national football team) Harry Bild
- (Hungary national football team) Antal Dunai
- (Hungary national football team) Mihály Laczkó
- (Spain national football team) Ramón Grosso
- (Spain national football team) Luis Vidal
- (Spain national football team) Manuel Velázquez
