= Football at the 1972 Summer Olympics – Men's European Qualifiers =

Tournament details
- Dates: 24 March 1971 – 31 May 1972
- Teams: 22 (from 1 confederation)

Tournament statistics
- Matches played: 36
- Goals scored: 112 (3.11 per match)

The Men's European Football Qualifiers for the 1972 Summer Olympics consisted of two stages, the first single elimination tournament and then group stage.

== First round ==
Football at the 1972 Summer Olympics – Men's European Qualifiers – First round

== Qualified teams ==
The following four teams from Europe qualified for the final tournament.

Team	Qualified as	Qualified on	Previous appearances in the Summer Olympics football tournament^{1} ^{2}
Soviet Union	Group 1 winners	18 November 1971	2 (1952, **1956**)
East Germany	Group 3 winners	26 April 1972	1 (1964)
Poland	Group 2 winners	7 May 1972	4 (1924, 1936, 1952, 1960)
Denmark	Group 4 winners	21 May 1972	6 (1908, 1912, 1920, 1948, 1952, 1960)

^{1} Bold indicates champions for that year. Italic indicates hosts for that year.
^{2} Includes all participations by a competing nation at the Summer Olympics (clubs representing nations, olympic teams, full national teams, etc.).
