= Hugh Lindsay =

Hugh Lindsay may refer to:

- Hugh Primrose Lindsay (1765–1844), British naval captain, director of East India Company
- Hugh Hamilton Lindsay (1802–1881), British businessman, director of East India Company
- Hugh B. Lindsay (1856–1944), American attorney, jurist and politician
- Hugh Lindsay (bishop) (1927–2009), Roman Catholic bishop
- Hugh Lindsay (footballer) (born 1938), English amateur footballer who played for Southampton and appeared in the 1960 Olympics
- Hugh Lindsay (British Army officer) (1954–1988), equerry to Queen Elizabeth II, 1983–1986
- HCS Hugh Lindsay (1829), a paddle steamer built in Bombay in 1829
