= Cicerone Manolache =

Romanian footballer and manager

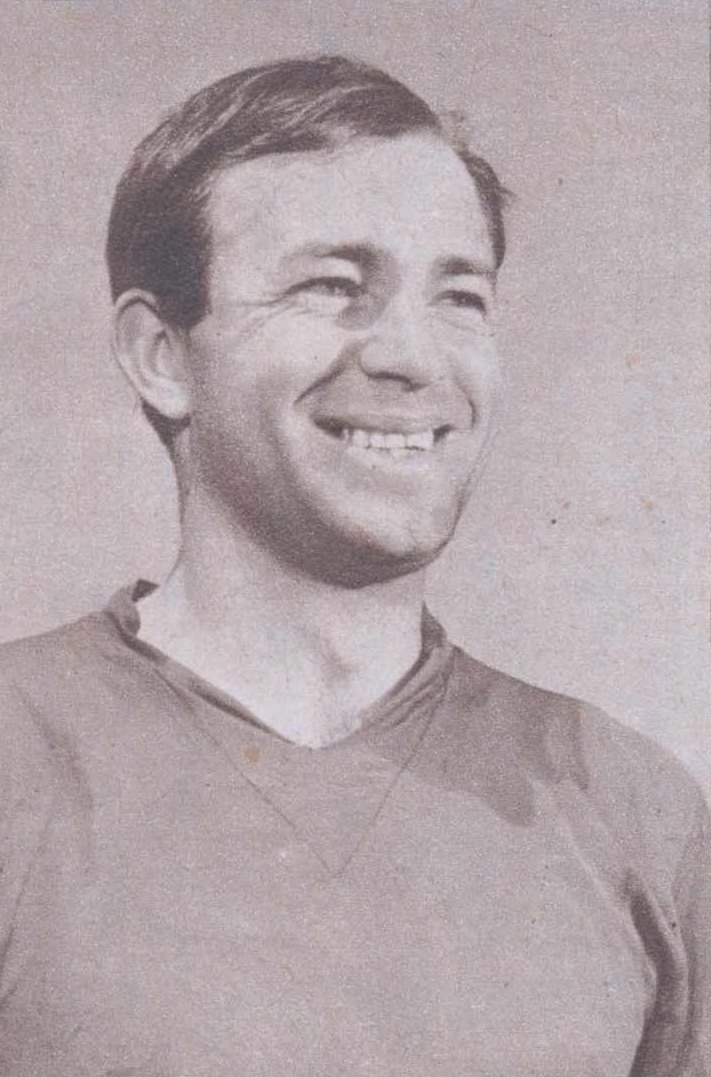
- Manolache in 1963

Personal information
- Date of birth: 16 May 1936
- Place of birth: Păunești, Romania
- Date of death: 28 January 2024 (aged 87)
- Height: 1.76 m (5 ft 9 in)
- Position: Forward

Youth career
- 1950–1957: FCM Reșița

Senior career*
Years	Team	Apps	(Gls)
1957–1959	FCM Reșița		
1959–1965	Știința Timișoara (Note: The statistics for the 1959–60 and 1964–65 Divizia B seasons are not available.)	94	(42)
1965–1968	Farul Constanța	66	(10)
1968–1969	Politehnica Timișoara	20	(9)
1969–1970	CFR Timișoara	37	(12)
1970–1971	UM Timișoara	6	(0)
Total		223	(73)

International career
1962–1963	Romania (Note: Including 3 appearances and 2 goals for Romania's Olympic team.)	7	(3)

Managerial career
- 1971–1972: CFR Timișoara
- 1972–1974: CARA Brazzaville
- 1974–1976: Congo
- 1976–1977: UTA Arad
- 1977–1978: UM Timișoara
- 1978–1979: FCM Reșița
- 1980–1981: FCM Reșița
- 1982: Politehnica Timișoara
- 1983–1984: Libya
- 2006: AS Covaci
- 2009–2016: Agronomia Timișoara
- * Club domestic league appearances and goals

Cicerone "Cici" Manolache (16 May 1936 – 28 January 2024) was a Romanian professional footballer and manager who played as a forward and made four appearances for Romania's national team.

== Club career ==
Manolache was born on 16 May 1936 in Păunești, Romania, but when he was three years old, his family moved to Reșița, and there he began playing junior-level football in 1950 at local club FCM. In 1957, he started to play senior football for Reșița in Divizia B where he would spend two seasons. Afterwards he joined Știința Timișoara in the same league, a team he helped earn promotion to Divizia A by scoring 18 goals in his first season. In the following season, Manolache made his Divizia A debut on 4 September 1960 under coach Eugen Mladin in a 0–0 draw against Rapid București. He made constant appearances for four seasons, the highlights of this period were in the 1962–63 season when he scored 15 goals and the team finished in third place. In the 1963–64 season, Știința was relegated back to Divizia B, but Manolache stayed with the club, helping it get promoted back to the first league after one year by scoring nine goals.

In 1965, Manolache went back to Divizia A football as he signed with Farul Constanța. He would spend the following three seasons at Farul, the most successful one was the 1966–67 edition when his six goals helped the club finish in fourth position. Afterwards he joined Politehnica Timișoara in Divizia B for one season. Then he moved to neighboring club CFR where he scored 12 goals in his first season, helping them gain promotion to Divizia A. In the following season, Manolache made his last Divizia A appearance on 28 November 1970, playing in CFR's 2–0 home loss to Argeș Pitești, totaling 171 matches with 52 goals in the competition. Among these goals, two were scored in the West derby against UTA Arad, contributing to two draws for Politehnica. He ended his career after playing for UM Timișoara in the 1970–71 Divizia B season.

== International career ==
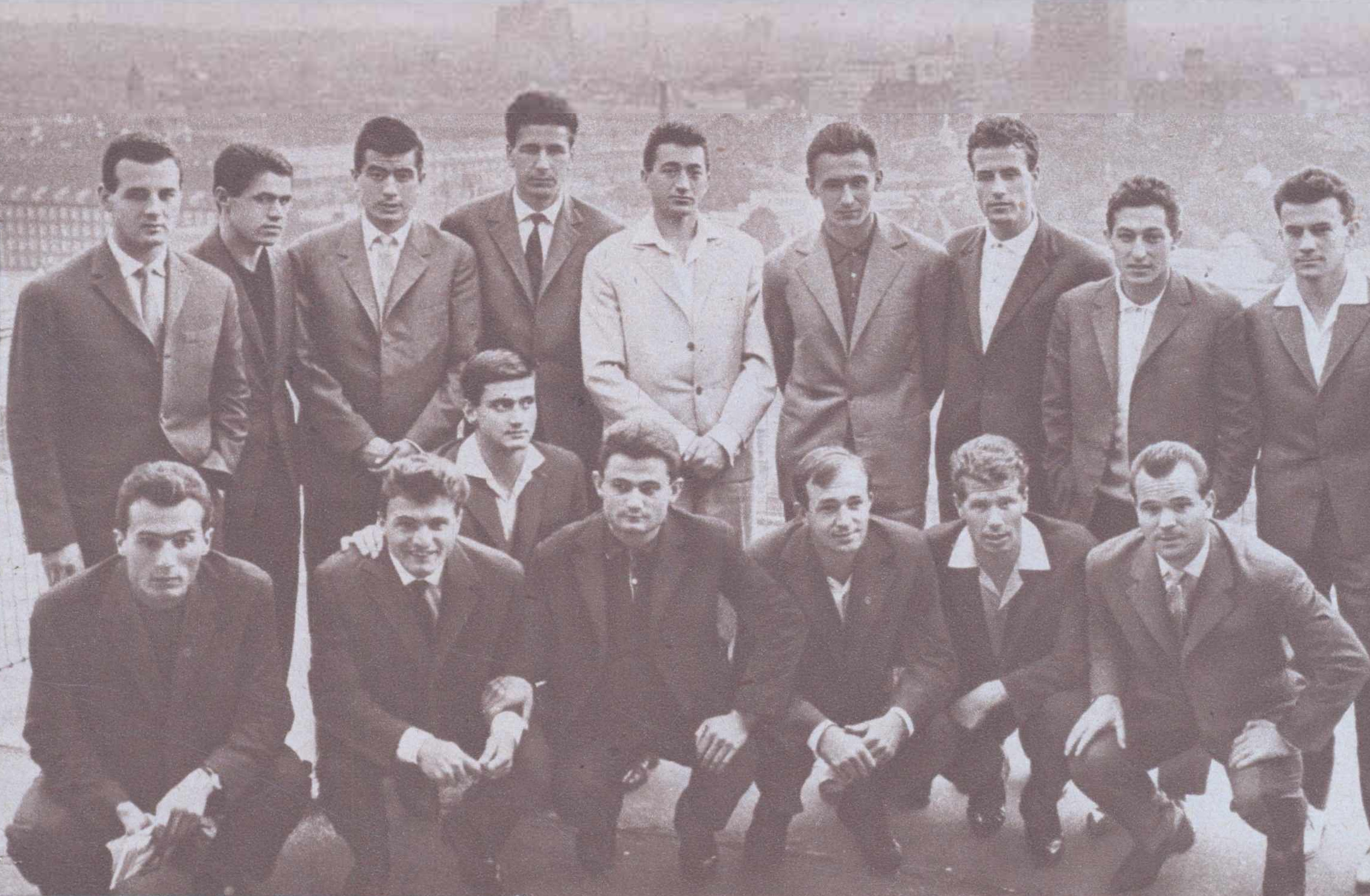
Manolache (bottom row, third from right) with the Romania Olympic team in Copenhagen, Denmark (1963)

Manolache played four games for Romania. He made his debut under coach Gheorghe Popescu on 25 November 1962 in a 1964 European Nations' Cup qualification match against Spain, in which he gave an assist to Nicolae Tătaru's goal and netted Romania's second goal in a 3–1 win. Even though the qualification was lost as in the first leg Spain won 6–0, his performance was praised by the Spanish press:"Romania showed as a team of great character, led on the field by the kid Manolache, the "roller" in the center of the attack line". Manolache said about the game:"We played with fantastic determination. We were going headfirst into the counter, on the crampons, we didn't care about anything. Just to win, to erase the stain from the national team's coat of arms". His following three games were friendlies, and the last one was a 0–0 draw against Turkey.

Manolache also played for Romania's Olympic team during the successful 1964 Summer Olympics qualifiers, scoring a brace in a 3–2 win over Denmark, but he was not called up for the final tournament.

== Managerial career ==
Manolache started coaching in 1971 at CFR Timișoara, leading the club for one year in Divizia B. Afterwards he went to coach abroad in Congo at CARA Brazzaville with whom he won the only trophies of his career, the 1973 Congo Premier League and the 1974 African Cup of Champions Clubs. Following his performances with CARA, he was appointed head coach of Congo's national team. He led them in the 1976 African Cup of Nations qualifiers, eliminating Ivory Coast in the first round but not managing to reach the final tournament as they were defeated in the following round by Nigeria. Subsequently, Manolache returned to his country, and had his first experience as a coach in Divizia A, leading UTA Arad to a 12th place in the 1976–77 season. In 1977 he went back to Divizia B, coaching UM Timișoara and FCM Reșița, having two spells at the latter. In 1982 he had his last Divizia A spell at Politehnica Timișoara when he was brought to replace Marcel Pigulea, totaling 66 games as manager in the competition. In 1983, Manolache returned to Africa, leading Libya's national team. However, in 1984 his spell ended because FIFA excluded Libya from all competitions for two years, due to not appearing in an away match with Egypt. From 1985 until 2016, Manolache worked for various clubs in the Romanian lower leagues, the last one being Agronomia Timișoara.

== Personal life ==
He was named Cicerone after the Roman philosopher, Cicero.

== Death ==
Manolache died on 28 January 2024 at age 87.

== Career statistics ==
=== International ===
Romania
Year	Apps	Goals
1962	2	1
1963	5	2
Total	7	3

=== International goals ===
No.	Date	Venue	Opponent	Score	Result	Competition
1	25 November 1962	Stadionul 23 August, Bucharest, Romania	Spain	2–0	3–1	1964 European Nations' Cup qualifiers
2	23 June 1963	Idrætspark, Copenhagen, Denmark	Denmark	2–1	3–2	1964 Summer Olympics qualifiers
3	23 June 1963	Idrætspark, Copenhagen, Denmark	Denmark	3–2	3–2	1964 Summer Olympics qualifiers

== Honours ==
=== Player ===
Știința Timișoara

- Divizia B: 1959–60, 1964–65

CFR Timișoara

- Divizia B: 1969–70

=== Manager ===
CARA Brazzaville

- Congo Premier League: 1973
- African Cup of Champions Clubs: 1974
