= Germany Olympic football team =

Germany Olympic
- Nickname(s): Nationalelf (national eleven); DFB-Elf (DFB Eleven) (Die) Mannschaft (The Team)
- Association: German Football Association (Deutscher Fußball-Bund – DFB)
- Confederation: UEFA (Europe)
- Most caps: Christian Schreier (22)
- Top scorer: Gottfried Fuchs; Frank Mill (10 goals each)
- FIFA code: GER
First colours	Second colours

First international
- Austria 5–1 Germany (Stockholm, Sweden; 29 June 1912)

Biggest win
- Germany 16–0 Russian Empire (Stockholm, Sweden; 1 July 1912)

Biggest defeat
- Austria 5–1 Germany (Stockholm, Sweden; 29 June 1912)

Summer Olympic Games
- Appearances: 10 (Note: by Germany national team (as West Germany from 1950 to 1990), and Germany national under-23 team) (first in 1912)
- Best result: Silver Medal (2016)
Medal record
Summer Olympic Games
Silver medal – second place	2016 Rio de Janeiro	Team
Bronze medal – third place	1988 Seoul	Team

The Germany Olympic football team represents Germany in international football competitions in Olympic Games. It has been active since 1908, and first competed in 1912.

Olympic football was originally an amateur sport, and as the pre–World War II German national team was also amateur, it was able to send a full national team to the games. After the war, Germany was divided, but until 1964 East and West competed under the name of "United Team of Germany", although without a combined squad. From 1968 West Germany began to compete on its own, but were still forced to send an amateur team, who were not able to match the success of their professional counterparts in the World Cup and European Championship. East Germany won gold in 1976 and silver in 1980.

The rules on amateurism were relaxed in the 1980s, which allowed West Germany some success, notably a bronze medal finish in 1988. Since 1992 the tournament has been competed by under-23 teams, making Germany's Olympic qualification dependent on the results of the under-21 team. Only in 2016 the Germans returned to the Olympic stage, with a silver medal after losing on a penalty shoot-out to hosts Brazil.

== History ==
=== Pre–World War II (1912–1938) ===
Germany first sent a football team to the Olympics in 1912, where they were defeated in the first round, losing 5–1 against neighbours Austria. They entered a consolation tournament, however, where they recorded a 16–0 win over Russia, with 10 goals from forward Gottfried Fuchs – this is still the national team's highest margin of victory. They were eliminated in the next round, though, with a 3–1 defeat against Hungary. After World War I, Germany was banned from the 1920 Olympics, and didn't compete in 1924, returning to action in 1928, when they were eliminated in the quarter finals by eventual winners Uruguay. Uruguay would go on to win the inaugural World Cup two years later.

Football wasn't included in the 1932 Olympics, but returned for the 1936 games, in Berlin. As hosts, and having finished third at the previous World Cup, hopes of a German success were high. It wasn't to be, though: after a 9–0 win against Luxembourg, Germany were eliminated in the quarter finals, losing 2–0 to Norway. The result cost coach Otto Nerz his job, being replaced by his assistant Sepp Herberger.

=== Division and unity (1948–1980) ===
Flag of the United Team of Germany 1956–1964

Following World War II, Germany were banned from the 1948 Olympics, but were back in 1952. By this point Germany was divided into three states – East Germany and the Saar protectorate having broken away, with what was left of the country commonly referred to as West Germany. Saar competed independently in 1952, but East Germany were unable to, and refused to represent a united German team. Consequently, the German Olympic team in 1952 was made up entirely of athletes from the west. The growth of professionalism in German football meant that the team they sent was no longer a senior national team squad, instead an amateur team. Despite this, Germany achieved their best result so far, reaching the semi-finals, where they were beaten by Yugoslavia. They lost 2–0 against Sweden in the bronze medal match.

Political tension between East and West Germany increased over time and this had an effect on sports as well. For the 1956 Summer Olympics, the west's football association delayed the negotiations for the process of forming a combined team for such a long time that the east's representatives gave up and let West Germany nominate the complete team for the United Team of Germany. At the qualifying tournament, West Germany had a wild card and thus qualified. The team lost its initial game against the eventual champions USSR and came 9th equal alongside the other two losers of the initial round.

Qualification games were held in 1960 and they are amongst the most bizarre games of football ever played by German teams, known as the "Geisterspiele" ("ghost games"). It was the first time that East and West German football teams competed, and the games were held in East Berlin (West Germany won 2–0) and, one week later, in Düsseldorf (West Germany won 2–1). This thus qualified the West German team. The stadiums were all but empty, with access available to journalists and officials only; no spectators were given access. In the subsequent European qualifying tournament, the West German team was in group two with Poland and Finland. The top team would qualify and Poland was successful.

The pre-qualification process repeated itself in 1964 but this time, spectators were allowed. East Germany won the first game in Karl-Marx-Stadt (now Chemnitz) with 3–0, and West Germany won 2–1 in Hanover. Thus, East Germany won the right to go to the European qualifying championships. In round one, East Germany beat the Netherlands. In round two, East Germany and the Soviet Union drew twice and needed a play-off in Warsaw that was won 4–1 by East Germany, thus qualifying the East German team for the Olympics for the first time. At the 1964 Olympic Games, the East German team won the bronze medal. As the East German league was technically amateur, even though the athletes were state-sponsored and trained full-time, the same as all other Eastern Bloc countries, it was able to send an "A" national team.

From 1968, East and West Germany competed separately, but West Germany failed to qualify for the 1968 games, losing against the United Arab Emirates in qualification. The 1972 Olympics were held in Munich, and West Germany qualified automatically as hosts – the amateur team, which contained future World Cup winner Uli Hoeneß and Champions League-winning coach Ottmar Hitzfeld, reached the second round, where they were eliminated in a group containing East Germany, who went on to win the bronze medals. West Germany did not qualify for either the 1976 or 1980 Olympics, losing against Spain and Norway respectively. However, East Germany managed to win the first gold medal at the 1976 Summer Olympics after beating Poland 3–1 in the final. At the next Olympiad, East Germans failed to win their second gold medal and received only silver, losing 1–0 to Czechoslovakia in the final of the 1980 Summer Olympics.

=== Olympiaauswahl (1984–1988) ===
The strict rules on amateurism had favoured Communist countries, who were able to send their senior national teams to the Olympics, as their leagues technically had amateur status. These rules were relaxed for the 1984 games: countries could select professional players, but only those who hadn't played in the finals of the World Cup. As such, West Germany selected a team known locally as the Olympiaauswahl (Olympic selection), similar in make-up to the B international team. Initially West Germany failed to qualify for the 1984 games, but were granted a reprieve following the boycott by Eastern Bloc countries. A team including future World Cup winners Andreas Brehme and Guido Buchwald reached the quarter-finals, losing 5–2 against Yugoslavia.

West Germany qualified for the 1988 Olympics, where they achieved their best ever result: third place. Having emerged from a group including China, Sweden and Tunisia, they beat Zambia 4–0 in the quarter finals. After losing on penalties to Brazil in the semi-finals, they beat Italy 3–0 to take the bronze medals: to date, this is the team's only tournament victory against Italy. Three strikers from the Olympic squad – Jürgen Klinsmann, Frank Mill and Karlheinz Riedle – would go on to win the World Cup two years later, along with midfielder Thomas Häßler.

=== Reunification (1992–present) ===
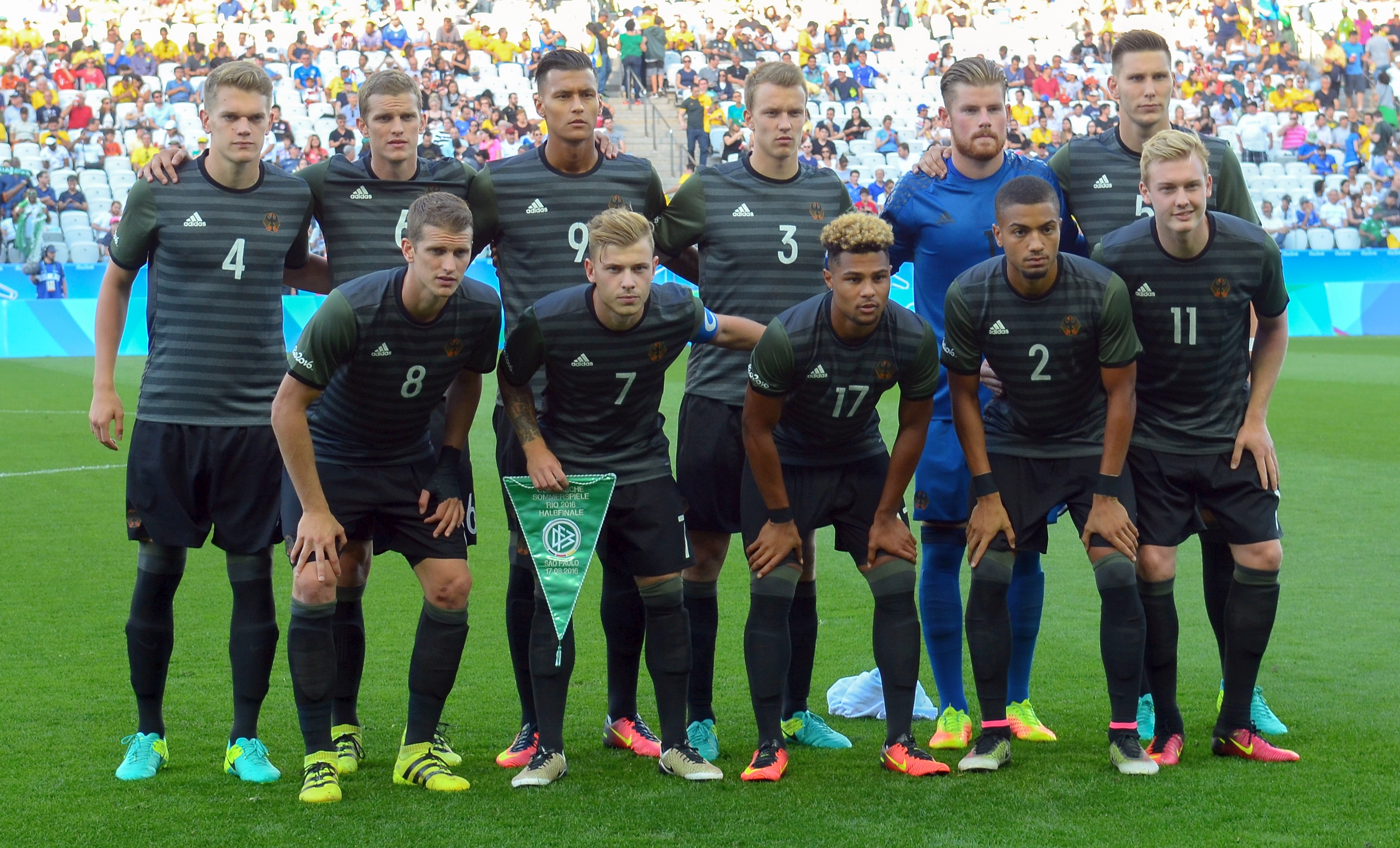
A Germany squad at the 2016 Summer Olympics.

Germany was reunified in 1990, and the 1992 Olympics saw another rule change: football squads would be made up of players under the age of 23, with three overage players allowed. On 23 June 2015 Germany was qualified for the first time after reunification for the 2016 Olympic games. The last time an Olympic team was specifically selected was in 1998 (a 1–0 defeat against Portugal). Olympic qualification is now decided by the under-21 team in the UEFA Under-21 Championship.

In the 2016 games held in Rio de Janeiro, Germany won the silver medal after losing to Brazil by 5–4 on penalty shoot-out; this was the first football game played between the two countries since the 2014 FIFA World Cup semifinal in which Germany beat Brazil 7–1. The German team also achieved the largest victory of the tournament, thrashing Fiji by a score of 10–0 in the group stage.

== Results and fixtures ==
Legend

Win Draw Lose Voided or Postponed Fixture

== Players ==
=== Current squad ===
- The following 19 players were called up for the 2020 Summer Olympics in Tokyo.
- Max Kruse, Maximilian Arnold and Nadiem Amiri were the three selected over 23 years old players.
- Caps and goals correct as of 28 July 2021.

No.	Pos.	Player	Date of birth (age)	Caps	Goals	Club
1	GK	Florian Müller	13 November 1997 (age 28)	3	0	(German Football Association) VfB Stuttgart
2	DF	Benjamin Henrichs	23 February 1997 (age 29)	3	0	(German Football Association) RB Leipzig
3	DF	David Raum	22 April 1998 (age 28)	3	0	(German Football Association) RB Leipzig
4	DF	Felix Uduokhai	9 September 1997 (age 29)	3	1	(German Football Association) FC Augsburg
5	DF	Amos Pieper	17 January 1998 (age 28)	2	0	(German Football Association) Arminia Bielefeld
6	MF	Ragnar Ache	28 July 1998 (age 28)	3	2	(German Football Association) Eintracht Frankfurt
7	FW	Marco Richter	24 November 1997 (age 28)	3	0	(German Football Association) FC Augsburg
8	MF	Maximilian Arnold* (captain)	27 May 1994 (age 32)	2	0	(German Football Association) VfL Wolfsburg
9	FW	Cedric Teuchert	14 January 1997 (age 29)	3	0	(German Football Association) Union Berlin
10	FW	Max Kruse*	19 March 1988 (age 38)	3	0	(German Football Association) Union Berlin
11	MF	Nadiem Amiri*	27 October 1996 (age 30)	3	2	(German Football Association) Bayer Leverkusen
12	GK	Svend Brodersen	22 March 1997 (age 29)	0	0	(Japan Football Association) Yokohama FC
13	MF	Arne Maier	8 January 1999 (age 27)	3	0	(German Football Association) Arminia Bielefeld
14	MF	Ismail Jakobs	17 August 1999 (age 27)	0	0	(German Football Association) 1. FC Köln
15	DF	Jordan Torunarigha	7 August 1997 (age 29)	3	0	(German Football Association) Hertha BSC
16	DF	Keven Schlotterbeck	28 April 1997 (age 29)	3	0	(German Football Association) SC Freiburg
17	MF	Anton Stach	15 November 1998 (age 27)	2	0	(German Football Association) Greuther Fürth
18	MF	Eduard Löwen	28 January 1997 (age 29)	3	1	(German Football Association) FC Augsburg
22	GK	Luca Plogmann	10 March 2000 (age 26)	0	0	(German Football Association) Werder Bremen

=== Overage players in Olympic Games ===
Tournament	Player 1	Player 2	Player 3
2016	Sven Bender (MF)	Lars Bender (MF)	Nils Petersen (FW)
2020	Maximilian Arnold (MF)	Nadiem Amiri (MF)	Max Kruse (FW)

== Competitive record ==
- 1900–1936 as → → → Germany
- 1948–1956 as West Germany
- 1956–1964 as United Team of Germany
- 1964–1990 as West Germany
- 1990–present as Germany

== Summer Olympics record ==
Gold medalists Silver medalists Bronze medalists

Summer Olympics										Qualification						
Year	Host	Round	Pld	W	D	L	F	A	Squad	Pos.	Pld	W	D	L	F	A
1900 to 1948		See Germany national football team								See Germany national football team						
as West Germany										as West Germany						
1952	Finland	Fourth place	4	2	0	2	8	8	Squad	Invited						
1956	Australia	First round	1	0	0	1	1	2	Squad	Qualified via walkover						
1960	Italy	Did not qualify								2nd	6	3	0	3	9	11
1964 (Note: East Germany won the play-off and represented the United Team of Germany)	Japan	Did not qualify								PR	2	1	0	1	2	4
1968	Mexico	Did not qualify								R2	2	1	0	1	1	2
1972	West Germany	Group stage	6	3	1	2	17	8	Squad	Qualified as hosts						
1976	Canada	Did not qualify								QR	2	0	1	1	2	3
1980	Soviet Union	Did not qualify								2nd	4	1	1	2	2	3
1984	United States	Quarter-finals	4	2	0	2	10	6	Squad	1st	6	3	1	2	8	5
1988	South Korea	Bronze medal	6	4	1	1	16	4	Squad	1st	8	5	2	1	16	4
as Germany										as Germany						
1992	Spain	Did not qualify								See Germany national under-21 football team						
1996	United States	Did not qualify								See Germany national under-21 football team						
2000	Australia	Did not qualify								See Germany national under-21 football team						
2004	Greece	Did not qualify								See Germany national under-21 football team						
2008	China	Did not qualify								See Germany national under-21 football team						
2012	United Kingdom	Did not qualify								See Germany national under-21 football team						
2016	Brazil	Silver medal	6	3	3	0	22	6	Squad	See Germany national under-21 football team						
2020	Japan	Group stage	3	1	1	1	6	7	Squad	See Germany national under-21 football team						
2024	France	Did not qualify								See Germany national under-21 football team						
2028	United States	To be determined								See Germany national under-21 football team						
Total		Silver medal	30	15	6	9	80	41	—	7/10	30	14	5	11	40	32

== Honours ==
=== Major competitions ===
Summer Olympic Games (Note: by Germany national team (as West Germany from 1950 to 1990), and Germany national under-23 team)

- Silver medal: 2016
- Bronze medal: 1988
- Fourth place: 1952

Overview
Event	1st place	2nd place	3rd place	4th place
Summer Olympic Games	–	1	1	1
Total	–	1	1	1

== Coaching history ==
- DFB Committee: 1912 – Stockholm
- Otto Nerz: 1928 – Amsterdam & 1936 – Berlin
- (West Germany) Sepp Herberger: 1952 – Helsinki & 1956 – Melbourne
- (West Germany) Jupp Derwall: 1972 – Munich
- (West Germany) Erich Ribbeck: 1984 – Los Angeles
- (West Germany) Hannes Löhr: 1988 – Seoul
- (Germany) Horst Hrubesch: 2016 – Rio de Janeiro
- (Germany) Stefan Kuntz: 2020 – Tokyo

== See also ==
- Sport in Germany
  - Football in Germany
    - Women's football in Germany
- Germany men's national football team
- Germany men's national football B team
- Germany men's national under-21 football team
- Germany women's national football team
