= Football at the 1976 Summer Olympics – Men's European Qualifiers =

Men's European Qualifier
Tournament details
- Teams: 21 (from 1 confederation)

Tournament statistics
- Matches played: 40
- Goals scored: 104 (2.6 per match)

The European Qualifiers for men's football competitions at the 1976 Summer Olympics to be held in Montreal.

Beside the already qualified Poland as the holders, the European countries obtained 4 additional spots in the Olympic football tournament. These four spots were contested by 20 countries.

This qualification competition was split in two parts. Four countries were selected to bypass the first round among which were: France, Iceland, Austria and Turkey. The 16 other countries were paired in 8 play-off matchups, winners of which would advance to the second round.

In the second round the eight teams were joined with the four teams that received bye in the first round and placed in 4 groups of 3. All groups used the double round-robin format to determine a group winner which would qualify for each of the European 4 spots.

== First round ==
Team 1	Agg.	Team 2	1st leg	2nd leg
Republic of Ireland	1–3	Czechoslovakia	1–2	0–1
West Germany	2–3	Spain	0–0	2–3
Finland	4–6	Norway	3–5	1–1
Greece	0–5	East Germany	0–1	0–4
Hungary	2–4	Bulgaria	2–0	0–4
Luxembourg	1–3	Netherlands	0–1	1–2
Romania	6–1	Denmark	4–0	2–1
Yugoslavia	1–4	Soviet Union	1–1	0–3

== Second round ==
=== Group 1 ===
Pos	Team	Pld	W	D	L	GF	GA	GD	Pts	Qualification
1	Soviet Union	4	4	0	0	10	1	+9	8	qualified to the 1976 Summer Olympics
2	Norway	4	1	1	2	5	10	−5	3	
3	Iceland	4	0	1	3	3	7	−4	1	

=== Group 2 ===
Pos	Team	Pld	W	D	L	GF	GA	GD	Pts	Qualification
1	East Germany	4	2	2	0	4	1	+3	6	qualified to the 1976 Summer Olympics
2	Czechoslovakia	4	1	3	0	6	1	+5	5	
3	Austria	4	0	1	3	0	8	−8	1	

=== Group 3 ===
Pos	Team	Pld	W	D	L	GF	GA	GD	Pts	Qualification
1	Spain	4	2	2	0	5	2	+3	6	qualified to the 1976 Summer Olympics
2	Bulgaria	4	2	1	1	7	3	+4	5	
3	Turkey	4	0	1	3	0	7	−7	1	

=== Group 4 ===
Pos	Team	Pld	W	D	L	GF	GA	GD	Pts	Qualification
1	France	4	3	1	0	5	1	+4	7	qualified to the 1976 Summer Olympics
2	Romania	4	1	1	2	2	3	−1	3	
3	Netherlands	4	0	2	2	1	4	−3	2	
