= Football at the 1964 Summer Olympics – Men's European Qualifiers – Group 4 =

The 1964 Summer Olympics football qualification – Europe Group 4 was one of the five European groups in the Summer Olympics football qualification tournament to decide which teams would qualify for the 1964 Summer Olympics football finals tournament in Japan. Group 4 consisted of three teams: Italy, Poland, Turkey. The teams played home-and-away knockout matches. Italy qualified for the Summer Olympics football finals after defeating Poland 4–0 on aggregate in the second round, though they were later disqualified for using professional players. Poland were offered Italy's place, but declined.

== Summary ==
Team 1	Agg.	Team 2	1st leg	2nd leg
First round
Turkey	3–9	Italy	2–2	1–7
Second round
Italy	4–0	Poland	3–0	1–0

== First round ==
Poland received a bye for the first round.

20 November 1963

Turkey	2–2	Italy
Aydın (?); Elmastaşoğlu (?)	Report	Giannini (?); Tamborini (?)

Ankara 19 Mayıs Stadyumu, Ankara
11 March 1964

Italy	7–1	Turkey
Domenghini (?); Mazzola (?); Lodetti (?); Petroni (?); Fortunato (?)	Report	Doğangün (?)

Stadio Comunale, Bergamo

Italy won 9–3 on aggregate and advanced to the second round.

== Second round ==
18 June 1964

Italy	3–0	Poland
Mazzola 39'; De Sisti 68'; Petroni 85'	Report

Stadio Olimpico, Rome
Attendance: 10,000
Referee: Branko Tesanić (Yugoslavia)
25 August 1964

Poland	0–1	Italy
	Report	? (?)

Stadion im. Edmunda Szyca, Poznań

Italy won 4–0 on aggregate and qualified for the Summer Olympics. Despite qualifying, Italy were disqualified from the Summer Olympics for using professional players.

== Goalscorers ==
There were 16 goals scored in 4 matches, for an average of 4 goals per match.

3 goals

- (Italy national football team) Sandro Mazzola
- (Italy national football team) Bruno Petroni

1 goal

- (Turkey national football team) Kemal Aydın
- (Turkey national football team) Ayfer Elmastaşoğlu
- (Italy national football team) Luigi Giannini
- (Italy national football team) Giuseppe Tamborini
- (Italy national football team) Angelo Domenghini
- (Italy national football team) Giovanni Lodetti
- (Italy national football team) Giuliano Fortunato
- (Italy national football team) Giancarlo De Sisti
- (Turkey national football team) Turan Doğangün
