= Ion Haidu =

Romanian footballer (born 1942)

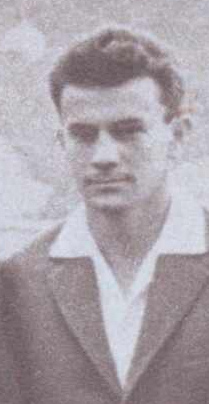

Personal information
- Full name: Ion Iuliu Haidu
- Date of birth: 1 January 1942 (age 84)
- Place of birth: Sepsiszentgyörgy, Hungary
- Height: 1.73 m (5 ft 8 in)
- Position: Forward

Youth career
- 1956–1959: Flamura Roșie Sfântu Gheorghe

Senior career*
Years	Team	Apps	(Gls)
1959–1960	CS Târgu Mureș		
1960–1962	Mureșul Târgu Mureș		
1962	Viitorul București	11	(5)
1963	Steagul Roșu Brașov	11	(2)
1963–1972	Dinamo București	152	(37)
1972–1975	Chimia Râmnicu Vâlcea	85	(2)
Total		259	(46)

International career
1962	Romania U18		
1963–1964	Romania Olympic	4	(1)
1963–1968	Romania	4	(2)
- * Club domestic league appearances and goals as of 24 January 2020

Ion Iuliu Haidu (also known as János Hajdu; born 1 January 1942) is a Romanian former footballer who played as a forward.

== Club career ==
Haidu was born 1 January 1942 in Sepsiszentgyörgy (now Sfântu Gheorghe), and began playing junior-level football in 1956 at local club Flamura Roșie. In 1959 he moved to Divizia B to play for CS Târgu Mureș, and after one year, he joined Mureșul Târgu Mureș in the same league. In 1962 he went to play for Viitorul București where on 19 August under coach Gheorghe Ola he made his Divizia A debut in a 7–0 win over Minerul Lupeni. For the second half of the season he went to play for Steagul Roșu Brașov.

In 1963, Haidu joined Dinamo București, helping the team win The Double in his first season, with coaches Nicolae Dumitru and Traian Ionescu using him in 21 games in which he scored six goals, also playing the entire match in the 5–3 victory over rivals Steaua București in the Cupa României final. In the same season he started playing in European competitions, making three appearances in the European Cup, helping his side get past East Germany champion, Motor Jena, but were eliminated in the following phase by Real Madrid. In the following season, Haidu helped The Red Dogs win another title, contributing with a personal record of 10 goals scored in the 23 matches he was used by coach Angelo Niculescu, including finding the net in a 1–0 derby win against Steaua. In the 1965–66 European Cup edition he scored the victory goal in a 2–1 win against Inter Milan, after which he said:"I'm happy for the success, but I'm also sad that we didn't impose ourselves more clearly". However, they did not qualify further as the second leg was lost with 2–0. Haidu won two more trophies with Dinamo, the first of which was the 1967–68 Cupa României when coach Bazil Marian used him the entire match in the 3–1 victory over Rapid București in the final. Subsequently, he won the 1970–71 title as he scored two goals in the 14 matches played under coaches Nicolae Dumitru and Traian Ionescu.

In 1972, Haidu went to play for Chimia Râmnicu Vâlcea in Divizia B, winning the 1972–73 Cupa României, being used by coach Dumitru Anescu all the minutes in both games in the final against Constructorul Galați. Subsequently, he played in both legs of the 4–2 aggregate loss to Glentoran in the European Cup Winners' Cup, having a total of 15 games with one goal in European competitions. In the same season the team earned promotion to the first league. In the following season, Haidu made his last Divizia A appearance, playing for Chimia on 29 June 1975 in a 3–0 away loss to Politehnica Iași, totaling 201 matches with 46 goals in the competition.

== International career ==
Under the guidance of coaches Nicolae Dumitrescu and Gheorghe Ola, Haidu helped Romania's under-18 national team win the 1962 European championship. He scored a goal in the 4–0 win over Turkey in the semi-finals and another one in the 4–1 victory against Yugoslavia in the final.

Haidu made four appearances and scored two goals for Romania, scoring the victory goal in his debut game, a 3–2 win over East Germany which took place on 12 May 1963, playing under coach Silviu Ploeșteanu. In his second game for the national team he opened the score in a 1–1 draw against Poland. He also played four games and scored one goal for Romania's Olympic team.

=== International goals ===
Scores and results list Romania's goal tally first, score column indicates score after each Haidu goal.

List of international goals scored by Ion Haidu
#	Date	Venue	Cap	Opponent	Score	Result	Competition
1	12 May 1963	Stadionul 23 August, Bucharest, Romania	1	East Germany	3–2	3–2	Friendly
2	2 June 1963	Stadion Śląski, Chorzów, Poland	2	Poland	1–0	1–1	Friendly

== Style of play ==
In July 1973, the Romanian magazine called Fotbal described Haidu's style of play:"Here (at Dinamo București) he will determine, in a way, that "Internazionale tactic" which has brought the Red and Whites the suite of four national titles in good measure. In the economy of that tactic, developed by coach Traian Ionescu, Haidu had one of the mission roles similar to that of Zagallo in the Brazil team or Corso in the aforementioned Milan formation. He would appear as the third man in the midfield (next to Emil Petru and Octavian Popescu) but you could also find him advanced, centering for the "bulldozers" Ene II or Frațilă".

== Honours ==
=== Club ===
Dinamo București

- Divizia A: 1963–64, 1964–65, 1970–71
- Cupa României: 1963–64, 1967–68

Chimia Râmnicu Vâlcea

- Divizia B: 1973–74
- Cupa României: 1972–73

=== International ===
Romania U18

- Under-18 European Championship: 1962
