= Cornel Pavlovici =

Romanian footballer (1942–2013)

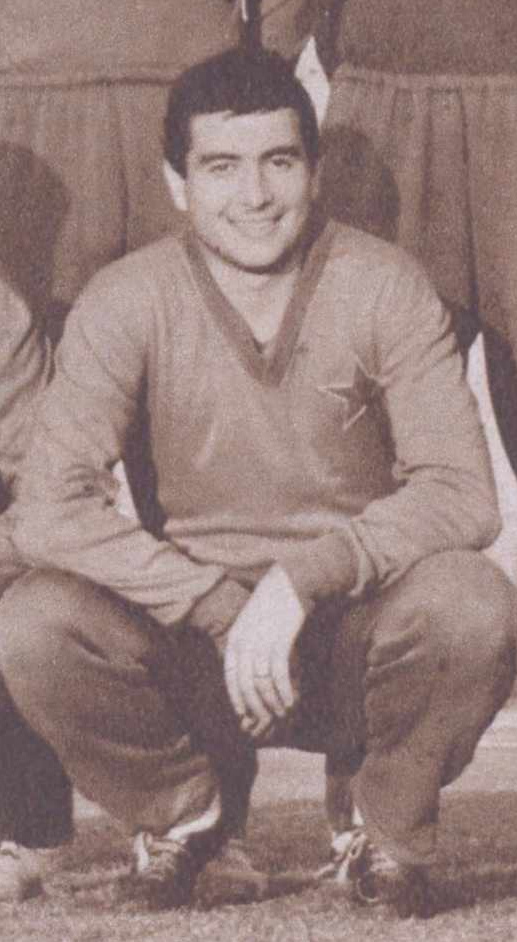
- Pavlovici in 1965

Personal information
- Date of birth: 2 April 1943
- Place of birth: Bucharest, Romania
- Date of death: 8 January 2013 (aged 69)
- Height: 1.77 m (5 ft 10 in)
- Position: Striker

Youth career
- 1952–1958: Locomotiva București

Senior career*
Years	Team	Apps	(Gls)
1960	Metalul București		
1960	Recolta Carei		
1961	Dinamo Baia Mare		
1961	ASMD Satu Mare		
1962	Jiul Petroșani	17	(10)
1962	Viitorul București	12	(7)
1963–1966	Steaua București	54	(35)
1966–1968	ASA Târgu Mureș (Note: The statistics for the 1966–67 Divizia B season are unavailable.)	14	(4)
1968	Argeș Pitești	2	(0)
1969	Petrolul Ploiești	11	(1)
1969–1970	Progresul București	17	(0)
1970–1972	Metalul Târgoviște	40	(11)
1972	Steagul Roșu Brașov	4	(0)
1972–1973	Metalul Turnu Severin	10	(0)
Total		181	(68)

International career
1962–1964	Romania U23	8	(0)
1964	Romania Olympic	4	(6)
1963	Romania	2	(1)
- * Club domestic league appearances and goals

Cornel Pavlovici (2 April 1943 – 8 January 2013) was a Romanian footballer who played as a striker.

== Club career ==
Pavlovici, nicknamed Pavca, was born on 2 April 1943 in Bucharest, Romania and began playing junior-level football in 1952 at Locomotiva București. He began his senior career in 1960 at Metalul București. Afterwards, he went to play for Recolta Carei, Dinamo Baia Mare and ASMD Satu Mare. In 1961, Pavlovici joined Jiul Petroșani, making his Divizia A debut under coach Bazil Marian on 15 October 1961 in a 5–2 away loss to Dinamo București.

Subsequently, he played in the first half of the 1962–63 season for Viitorul București, moving for the second half to Steaua București. In the following season, he became the top-scorer of the season alongside Constantin Frățilă, netting 19 goals, including a hat-trick in a 4–1 win over rivals Dinamo. Afterwards, Pavlovici netted two goals in the 5–0 aggregate victory against Derry City in the first round of the 1964–65 European Cup Winners' Cup. In the 1965–66 season, he scored a brace in a 3–3 league draw against Dinamo and won the Cupa României, but coach Ilie Savu did not use him in the 4–0 victory against UTA Arad in the final.

In 1966, Pavlovici joined ASA Târgu Mureș in Divizia B, scoring 15 goals in his first season to help them gain first-league promotion. Two years later, he joined Argeș Pitești where he played in a 3–0 loss to Göztepe in the second round of the 1968–69 Inter-Cities Fairs Cup. In the middle of the 1968–69 season, he went to play for Petrolul Ploiești. Then Pavlovici returned to Divizia B football, signing with Progresul București which he helped gain promotion to the first league. However, he remained in the second league, joining Metalul Târgoviște.

In the middle of the 1971–72 season, Pavlovici went to Steagul Roșu Brașov where he made his last Divizia A appearance on 19 April 1972 in a 1–0 home win over Crișul Oradea, totaling 114 matches with 57 goals in the competition. Pavlovici ended his career after playing for Metalul Turnu Severin during the 1972–73 Divizia B season.

== International career ==
From 1962 to 1964, Pavlovici made eight appearances for Romania's under-23 team.

Pavlovici played two matches for Romania, making his debut on 12 May 1963 when coach Silviu Ploeșteanu sent him at halftime to replace Cicerone Manolache in a 3–2 friendly win over East Germany in which he scored a goal. His second appearance occurred about a month later in a 1–1 friendly draw against Poland.

Pavlovici also represented Romania's Olympic team, playing four games under coach Silviu Ploeșteanu during the 1964 Summer Olympics in Tokyo. He scored six goals, including one against East Germany in a draw, goals in wins over Iran and Yugoslavia, and a hat-trick in a 4–2 victory against Ghana, which contributed to his team's fifth-place finish in the tournament.

=== International goals ===
Scores and results list Romania's goal tally first. "Score" column indicates the score after each Pavlovici goal.

List of international goals scored by Cornel Pavlovici
#	Date	Venue	Opponent	Score	Result	Competition
1.	12 May 1963	Stadionul 23 August, Bucharest, Romania	East Germany	1–2	3–2	Friendly
2.	13 October 1964	Komazawa Stadium, Setagaya, Tokyo, Japan	East Germany	1–1	1–1	1964 Summer Olympics
3.	15 October 1964	Omiya Park Soccer Stadium, Omiya, Saitama, Japan	Iran	1–0	1–0	1964 Summer Olympics
4.	20 October 1964	Nishikyogoku Athletic Stadium, Kyoto, Japan	Ghana	1–0	4–2	1964 Summer Olympics
5.	20 October 1964	Nishikyogoku Athletic Stadium, Kyoto, Japan	Ghana	2–0	4–2	1964 Summer Olympics
6.	20 October 1964	Nishikyogoku Athletic Stadium, Kyoto, Japan	Ghana	4–2	4–2	1964 Summer Olympics
7.	22 October 1964	Nagai Stadium, Osaka, Japan	Yugoslavia	1–0	3–0	1964 Summer Olympics

== Personal life and death ==
Sports commentator Ilie Dobre wrote a book about him titled Cornel Pavlovici sau fascinația golului (Cornel Pavlovici or the fascination of the goal), which was released in 2004.

Pavlovici died on 8 January 2013 at age 69.

== Honours ==
=== Club ===
Steaua București

- Cupa României: 1965–66

ASA Târgu Mureș

- Divizia B: 1966–67

Progresul București

- Divizia B: 1969–70

=== Individual ===
- Divizia A top scorer: 1963–64 (joint with Constantin Frățilă)
