= Heino Kleiminger =

German footballer (1939–2015)

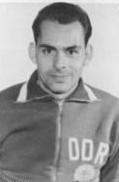
- Kleiminger in 1964.

Personal information
- Date of birth: 3 February 1939
- Place of birth: Wismar, Mecklenburg, Germany
- Date of death: 16 April 2015 (aged 76)
- Positions: Forward; midfielder

Heino Kleiminger (3 February 1939 – 16 April 2015) was a German footballer. His career took place in East Germany, then an independent state known as German Democratic Republic.

Kleiminger, born in Wismar, Mecklenburg, originally played for BSG Motor Wismar. In 1956 he joined first division club SC Empor Rostock which in 1965 mutated into FC Hansa Rostock. The forward stayed there until 1970 and scored 62 goals in 186 league matches. In this period the club was four times runner-up in the championship and three times finalist in the cup competition. In 1963 and 1964 he won 4 caps for East Germany, scoring five goals, four thereof in a 12-1 win against Ceylon in Colombo. Between 1970 and 1974 he played for the second division side TSG Wismar.

From 1976 to 1981 he served as coach for second division club TSG Bau Rostock, nowadays known as Rostocker FC.

Kleiminger survived a massive heart attack in 1997, and had a bypass operation in 1998. He died from cancer on 16 April 2015 in Rostock aged 76. His son Ralf Kleiminger, born 1963, was also a footballer and played in the 1980s 32 matches in the East German first division for Rostock and 1. FC Magdeburg.

== Career statistics ==
=== International goals ===
| # | Date | Venue | Opponent | Score | Result | Competition |
|---|---|---|---|---|---|---|
| 1. | 17 December 1963 | Bogyoke Aung San Stadium, Yangon, Burma | Burma | 1–5 | Won | Friendly |
| 2. | 12 January 1964 | Sugathadasa Stadium, Colombo, Ceylon | Ceylon | 1–12 | Won | Friendly |
| 3. | 12 January 1964 | Sugathadasa Stadium, Colombo, Ceylon | Ceylon | 1–12 | Won | Friendly |
| 4. | 12 January 1964 | Sugathadasa Stadium, Colombo, Ceylon | Ceylon | 1–12 | Won | Friendly |
| 5. | 12 January 1964 | Sugathadasa Stadium, Colombo, Ceylon | Ceylon | 1–12 | Won | Friendly |
Correct as of 6 October 2015
