= Emil Petru =

Romanian footballer

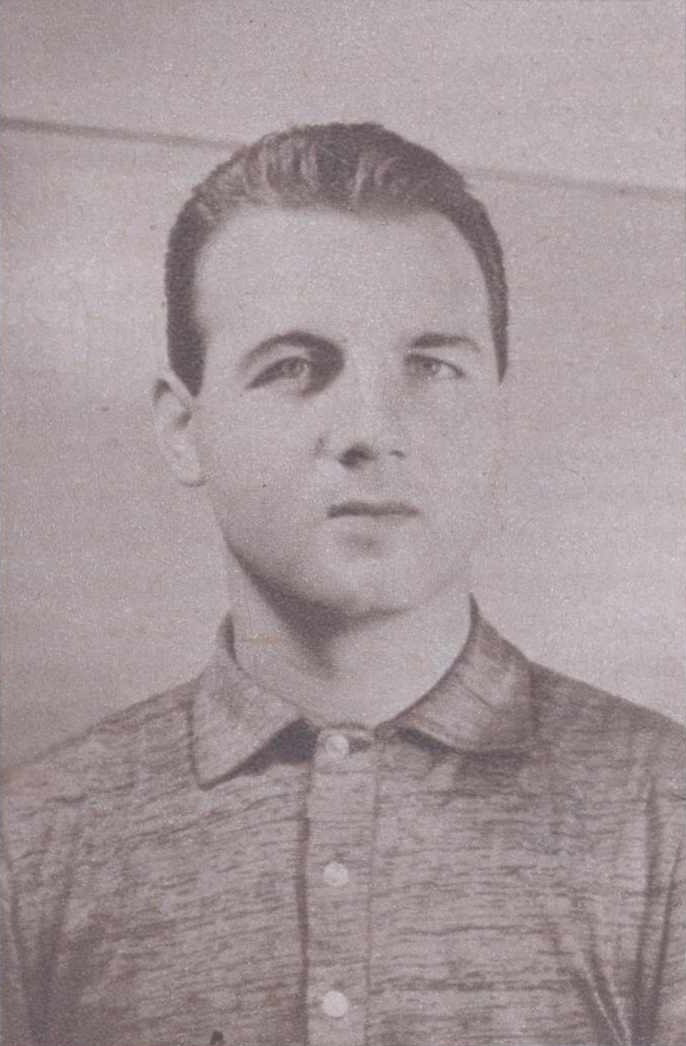
- Petru in 1963

Personal information
- Date of birth: 28 September 1939
- Place of birth: Târnăveni, Romania
- Date of death: 1 March 1995 (aged 55)
- Place of death: Cluj-Napoca, Romania
- Height: 1.77 m (5 ft 10 in)
- Position: Midfielder

Youth career
- 1949–1955: Știința Cluj

Senior career*
Years	Team	Apps	(Gls)
1956–1963	Știința Cluj	129	(30)
1963–1966	Dinamo București	47	(4)
1966–1967	Universitatea Cluj	15	(1)
1967–1969	CFR Cluj	36	(0)
Total		227	(35)

International career^{‡}
1961–1963	Romania U-23	2	(0)
1961–1963	Romania B	2	(0)
1962–1969	Romania (Note: Including 9 appearances and two goals for Romania's Olympic team.)	16	(4)
- * Club domestic league appearances and goals as of 19 September 2017 ‡ National team caps and goals as of 19 September 2017

Emil Petru (28 September 1939 – 1 March 1995) was a Romanian professional footballer who played as a midfielder. In his career, he played mainly for Universitatea Cluj and represented Romania in the 1964 Summer Olympics.

== Club career ==
Petru was born on 28 September 1939 in Târnăveni, Romania and began playing junior-level football in 1949 at Știința Cluj. He made his Divizia A debut under coach Nicolae Munteanu on 7 October 1956 in a 3–1 away loss against Dianmo Brașov, and also appeared in an 8–0 loss to Dinamo București by the end of the season. The team was relegated at the end of his first season, but Petru stayed with the club, helping it get promoted after one season with 12 goals scored in 16 appearances. This included a hat-trick against Locomotiva Arad, four goals in an away game against Tractorul Brașov and a brace in a Cluj derby against CFR Cluj. In the following five seasons, Petru was a constant presence for the team in the first league, the highlights of this period were two fourth positions in the 1960–61 and 1962–63 seasons, and also eight goals scored in the 1961–62 season.

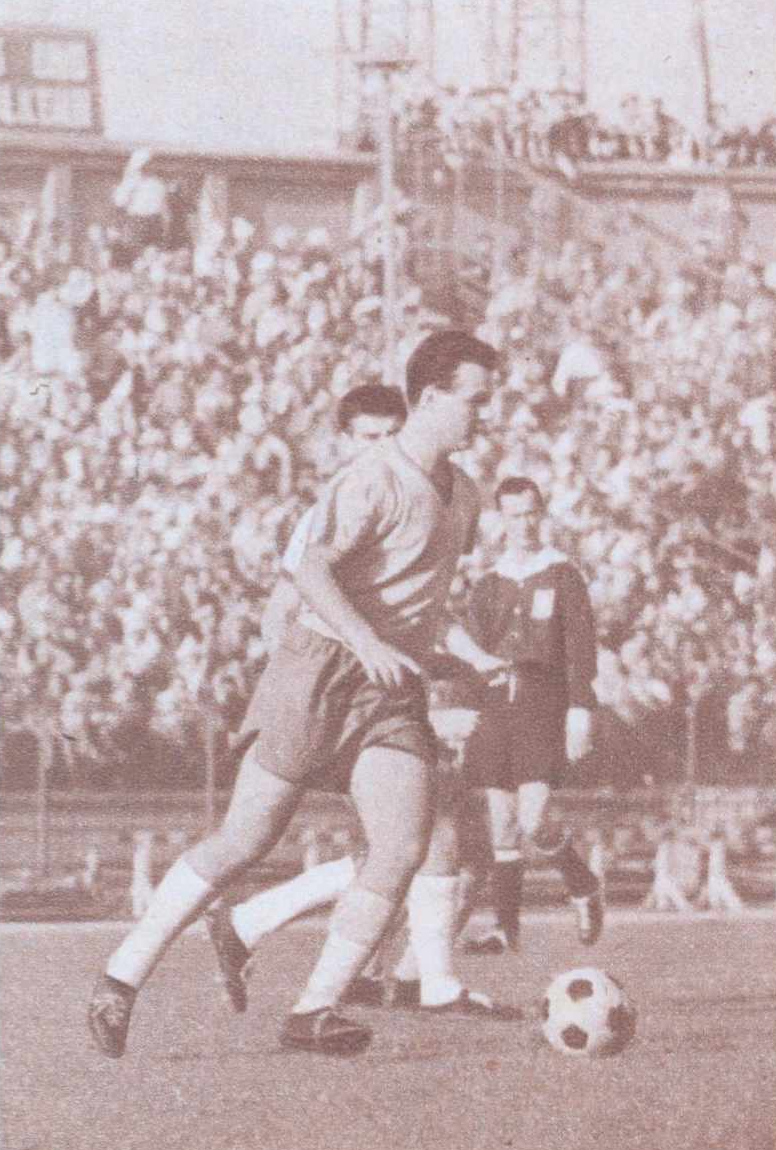
Petru scored the second goal in the 1963–64 European Cup first leg match against Motor Jena in Bucharest.

In 1963, he joined Dinamo București. In his first season, Petru helped them win The Double, coaches Traian Ionescu and Nicolae Dumitru using him in 23 league games in which he scored eight goals, and he also played the entire match in the 5–3 win over rivals Steaua București in the Cupa României final. In the same season he made four appearances in the European Cup, scoring one goal in a 2–0 victory against East Germany champion Motor Jena which helped the club advance to the next phase where they were eliminated by Real Madrid. In the following season, Petru won another title with The Red Dogs, contributing with four goals scored in the 19 matches he was used by coach Angelo Niculescu, including finding the net in a 2–1 derby win against Steaua. He also played four games in the 1964–65 European Cup, scoring one goal that helped them eliminate Sliema Wanderers, the campaign ending in the following round as they were defeated by Inter Milan.

After three seasons spent at Dinamo, Petru returned to "U" Cluj where on 11 June 1967 he made his last Divizia A appearance in a 4–2 away victory over Dinamo Pitești, totaling 175 games with 31 goals in the competition. Afterwards, he went for the last two seasons of his career at CFR Cluj, helping the club earn promotion to the first league in his second season.

== International career ==
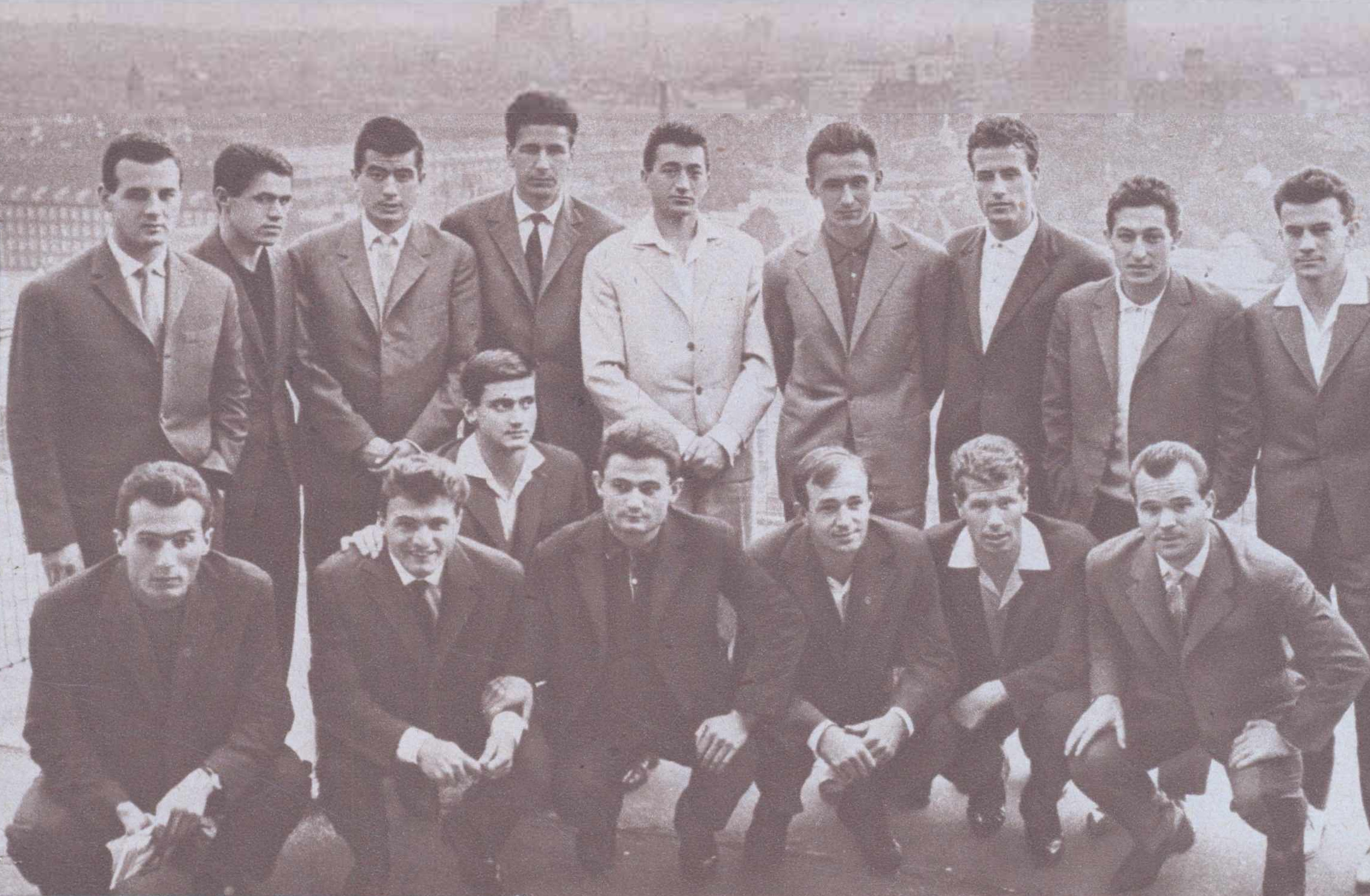
Petru (top row, first left) with the Romanian Olympic team in Copenhagen, Denmark (1963)

Petru played seven games and scored two goals for Romania, making his debut on 30 September 1962 under coach Constantin Teașcă in a 4–0 friendly victory against Morocco. In his following game, also a friendly, he scored a brace in an eventual 3–2 loss to East Germany. He then played in both legs of the 7–3 loss on aggregate to Spain in the 1964 European Nations' Cup qualifying preliminary round. His last appearance for the national team took part on 9 October 1963, a 0–0 draw in a friendly against Turkey.

Petru also played for Romania's Olympic team, scoring a brace in a 3–2 loss to Denmark during the successful 1964 Summer Olympics qualifiers. At the final tournament in Tokyo, coach Silviu Ploeșteanu used him in a 3–1 group stage victory against Mexico, a 2–0 loss to Hungary in the quarter-finals, and in a 3–0 win over Yugoslavia which helped the team finish in fifth place.

=== International goals ===
Scores and results list Romania's goal tally first, score column indicates score after each Petru goal.

Goal	Date	Venue	Opponent	Score	Result	Competition
1	14 October 1962	Heinz-Steyer-Stadion, Dresden, East Germany	East Germany	1–2	2–3	Friendly
2	14 October 1962	Heinz-Steyer-Stadion, Dresden, East Germany	East Germany	2–2	2–3	Friendly
3	3 November 1963	Stadionul 23 August, Bucharest, Romania	Denmark	1–3	2–3	1964 Summer Olympics qualifiers
4	3 November 1963	Stadionul 23 August, Bucharest, Romania	Denmark	2–3	2–3	1964 Summer Olympics qualifiers

== Style of play ==
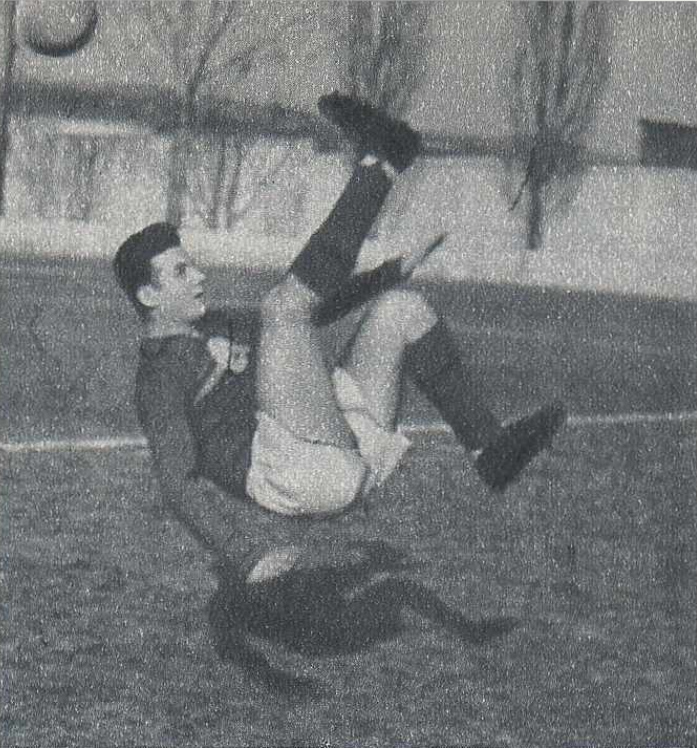
Petru executes a bicycle kick during a training session in 1957.

Dr. Constantin Rădulescu described Emil Petru as:"Raised at "U", one of the biggest players of Cluj and the country. He played in the junior, youth and senior national teams in numerous matches. Tall with a princely outfit, head held high, peripheral view (for which the coaches of the little ones strive enormously) which he had natively, exceptional technique, as well as the tactical timing of the execution. Relentless right-footed kicks (he scored goals from long 25–30 meter distances), excellent header by lobbing the ball from a diving jump, with perfect mental and moral balance (he played against Real Madrid as well as against Sticla Turda). He had a tendency to gain weight which is why he had a short career."

Marius Bretan said about him:"Attacking midfielder similar to Dobrin, complete, with extraordinary qualities."

== Personal life and death ==
Petru was a graduate of the Faculty of Law from Cluj. After retiring from his playing career, he worked as a coach, eventually becoming the coordinator of the Universitatea Cluj's Children and Junior Center. Petru died on 1 March 1995 at age 55.

== Honours ==
Știința Cluj

- Divizia B: 1957–58

Dinamo București

- Divizia A: 1963–64, 1964–65
- Cupa României: 1963–64

CFR Cluj

- Divizia B: 1968–69
