= Constantin Koszka =

Romanian footballer

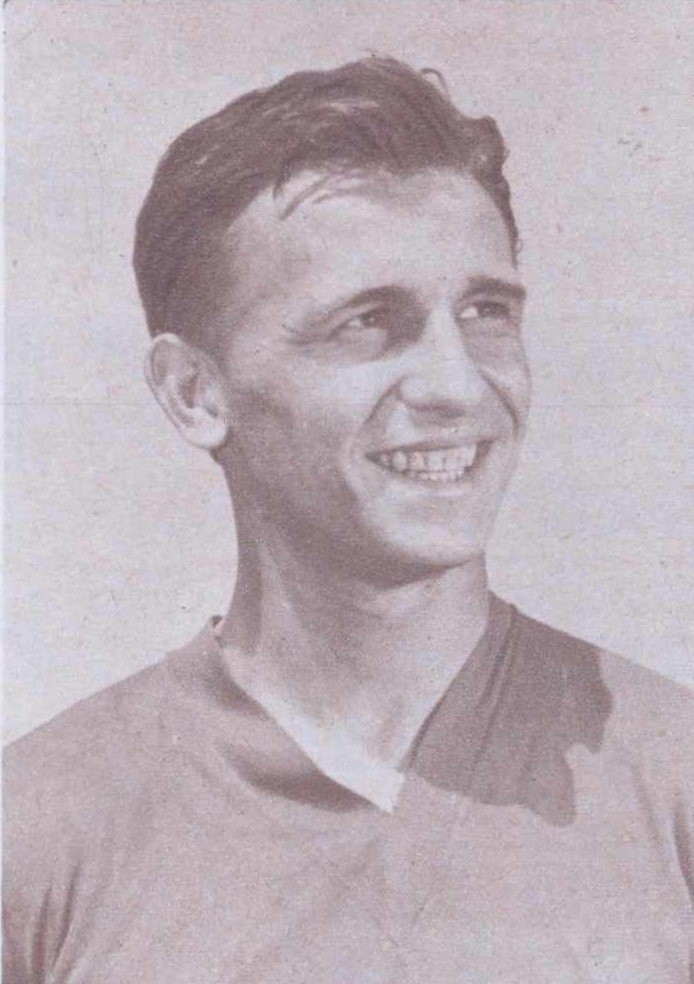

Personal information
- Date of birth: 17 September 1939
- Place of birth: Arad, Romania
- Date of death: December 2000 (aged 61)
- Place of death: Constanța, Romania
- Height: 1.80 m (5 ft 11 in)
- Position: Midfielder

Youth career
- UTA Arad

Senior career*
Years	Team	Apps	(Gls)
1957–1959	UTA Arad	23	(0)
1959–1961	Rapid București	48	(0)
1962–1963	UTA Arad	32	(1)
1963–1965	Steaua București	35	(0)
1965–1970	Farul Constanța	114	(3)
1970–1971	Trabzonspor	6	(2)
1971–1972	Portul Constanța	15	(0)
Total		273	(6)

International career
1962–1967	Romania (Note: Including 12 appearances and one goal for Romania's Olympic team.)	21	(1)
- * Club domestic league appearances and goals

Constantin Koszka (17 September 1939 – December 2000) was a Romanian footballer. He competed in the men's tournament at the 1964 Summer Olympics.

== Club career ==
Koszka was born on 17 September 1939 in Arad, Romania. He began playing junior-level football at local club UTA with which he won the 1956 national junior championship under the guidance of coach Nicolae Dumitrescu. Subsequently, he made his Divizia A debut on 24 November 1957 under coach Eugen Mladin in UTA's 2–0 away loss to Locomotiva București. In 1959 he went to play for Rapid București. In the middle of the 1961–62 season, after two and a half years, he left Rapid to make a comeback at UTA.

In 1963 he signed with Steaua București. During his spell with The Military Men, Koszka made his only three appearances in European competitions, helping his side get past Derry City in the first round of the 1964–65 European Cup Winners' Cup, being eliminated in the following one by Dinamo Zagreb. In 1965 he joined Farul Constanța, helping them earn a fourth place in the 1966–67 season while working with coach Virgil Mărdărescu. On 22 July 1970 he made his last Divizia A appearance in Farul's 1–1 away draw against CFR Cluj, totaling 252 matches with four goals in the competition. Subsequently, he was transferred to Trabzonspor in Turkey, being the club's first-ever foreign player. He spent only one season there, playing six matches and scoring twice in the Turkish second league. Koszka ended his career after playing in the 1971–72 Divizia B season for Portul Constanța.

== International career ==
Koszka played nine matches for Romania, making his debut on 30 September 1962 under coach Constantin Teașcă in a 4–0 friendly win against Morocco. He played in both legs of the 7–3 aggregate loss to Spain in the 1964 European Nations' Cup qualifying preliminary round. His last appearance for the national team took place on 29 October 1967 in a friendly 1–0 win against West Germany.

Koszka also played for Romania's Olympic team, being chosen by coach Silviu Ploeșteanu to be part of the 1964 Summer Olympics squad in Tokyo where he appeared in four games, helping the team finish in fifth place.

== Death ==
Koszka died in 2000 in Constanța.
