= Henning Frenzel =

German footballer

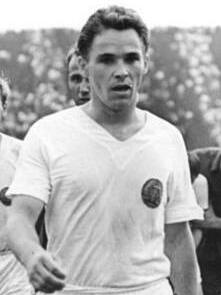
- Frenzel in 1976

Personal information
- Date of birth: 3 May 1942 (age 84)
- Place of birth: Geithain, Germany
- Height: 1.76 m (5 ft 9 1/2 in)
- Position: Striker

Youth career
- 1952–1959: Motor Gethain

Senior career*
Years	Team	Apps	(Gls)
1960–1978	Lokomotive Leipzig	420	(152)
2004	Lokomotive Leipzig	1	(0)
Total		421	(152)

International career
1961–1974	East Germany	54	(19)
	East Germany Olym.	16	(8)
Medal record
Men's football
Representing Germany
Olympic Games
Bronze medal – third place	1964 Tokyo	Team competition
- * Club domestic league appearances and goals

Henning Frenzel (born 3 May 1942 in Geithain) is a German former footballer. Frenzel was active in East Germany, and spent his entire career with Lokomotive Leipzig (in its various guises), where he totalled 420 appearances and 152 goals, respectively the third and fourth best in the DDR-Oberliga. He won 42 caps for East Germany, scoring 19 goals, and was part of the bronze medal-winning side at the 1964 Olympics. After retiring in 1978 he worked as a youth coach. In 2004, at the age of 62, he made a comeback for the now re-established Lokomotive Leipzig, in a Kreisliga-3 (tier 11) match against SV Paunsdorf.

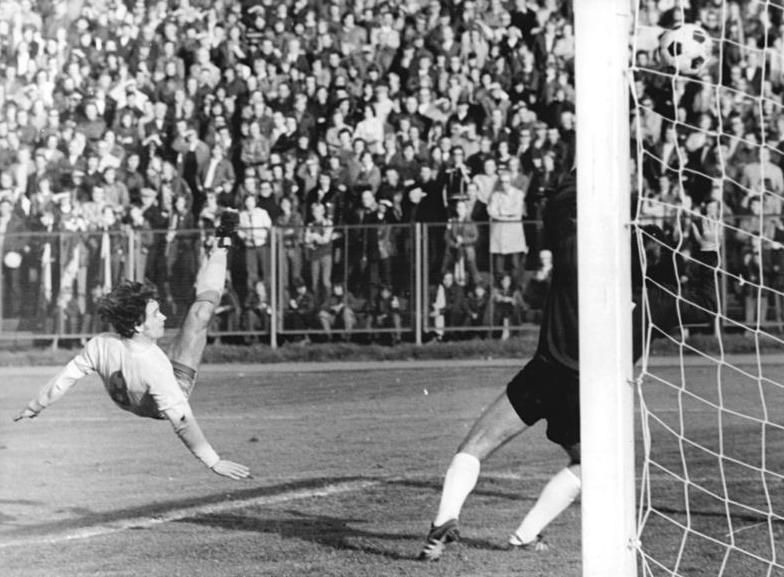
Frenzel scoring against Rot-Weiß Erfurt in 1975
