= East Germany Olympic football team =

Olympic association football team of East Germany

East Germany Olympic
- Nickname: "Weltmeister in Freundschaftsspielen" (World champion in friendly games)
- Association: Deutscher Fußball-Verband der DDR — DFV
- Confederation: UEFA (Europe)
- FIFA code: GDR
First colours	Second colours

Summer Olympic Games
- Appearances: 4 (first in 1964)
- Best result: Gold Medal, 1976
Medal record
Gold medal – first place	1976 Montreal	Team
Silver medal – second place	1980 Moscow	Team
Bronze medal – third place	1964 Tokyo	Team
Bronze medal – third place	1972 Munich	Team

The East Germany Olympic football team, recognized as Germany DR by FIFA, was from 1952 to 1990 the football team of East Germany for Olympic football events, playing as one of three post-war German teams, along with Saarland and West Germany.

After German reunification in 1990, the Deutscher Fußball-Verband der DDR (DFV), and with it the East German team, joined the Deutscher Fußball-Bund (DFB).

== Summer Olympics record ==
Gold medalists Silver medalists Bronze medalists

Summer Olympics										Qualification						
Year	Host	Round	Pld	W	D	L	F	A	Squad	Pos.	Pld	W	D	L	F	A
1960	Italy	Did not qualify								PR	2	0	0	2	1	4
1964	Japan	Bronze medal	6	4	1	1	12	4	Squad	R2	7	4	2	1	14	6
1968	Mexico	Did not qualify								F	4	3	0	1	14	6
1972	West Germany	Bronze medal	7	4	1	2	23	9	Squad	R2	4	3	1	0	7	0
1976	Canada	Gold medal	5	4	1	0	10	2	Squad	1st	6	4	2	0	9	1
1980	Soviet Union	Silver medal	6	4	1	1	12	2	Squad	Qualified as holders						
1984	United States	Qualified but withdrew								1st	8	6	1	1	14	5
1988	South Korea	Did not qualify								2nd	8	4	3	1	12	5
Total		Gold medal	24	16	4	8	57	17	—	5/8	39	24	9	6	71	27

== Honours ==
=== Major competitions ===
- Olympic Games
  - (gold) Gold medal (1): 1976
  - (silver) Silver medal (1): 1980
  - (bronze) Bronze medal (2): 1964, 1972

=== Friendly ===
- Malta International Football Tournament
  - (gold) Champions (1): 1988

== See also ==
- East Germany national football team
- East Germany national under-21 football team
- Germany Olympic football team
