= Czechoslovakia Olympic football team =

National association football team

Czechoslovakia Olympic
- Association: Československý fotbalový svaz
- FIFA code: TCH
First colours	Second colours

Summer Olympic Games
- Appearances: 4 (first in 1920)
- Best result: Gold Medal, 1980

Olympic medal record

Men's Football
Gold medal – first place	1980 Moscow	Team
Silver medal – second place	1964 Tokyo	Team

The Czechoslovakia Olympic football team was a national football team of Czechoslovakia, before the country split into the Czech Republic and Slovakia around the turn of the year 1992/93. Varying changes regarding the conditions of participation for Olympic Games over the years resulted in different eligible players for this team. For a long time it was almost identical with the Czechoslovakia national team and a lot of games were counted as full internationals. Since the late 1970s the squad of the two teams diverged from each other because players who had participated at FIFA World Cup matches were ruled out for the Olympic team. Because of age restrictions already in the qualifying stage for the 1992 Summer Games in Barcelona the Czechoslovakia under-21 selection replaced the team. As in Europe the UEFA Under-21 Championship became the qualifying format for the Olympic Football tournaments the national under-21 teams of the two independent countries, Czech Republic under-21 team and Slovakia under-21 team, became the virtually successor sides of the Czechoslovakia Olympic selection and the Czechoslovakia under-21 team respectively.

== Summer Olympics record ==
Gold medalists Silver medalists Bronze medalists

Since 1992 the Olympic roster may consist out of under-23 year old players, plus three over the age players.

Summer Olympics										Qualification						
Year	Host	Round	Pld	W	D	L	F	A	Squad	Pos.	Pld	W	D	L	F	A
1908 to 1956		See Czechoslovakia national football team								See Czechoslovakia national football team						
1960	Italy	Did not qualify								2nd	4	1	1	2	4	5
1964	Japan	Silver medal	6	5	0	1	19	5	Squad	R2	2	2	0	0	8	2
1968	Mexico	First round	3	1	1	1	10	3	Squad	F	2	1	0	1	5	3
1972	West Germany	Did not enter								Did not enter						
1976	Canada	Did not qualify								2nd	6	3	3	0	9	2
1980	Soviet Union	Gold medal	6	4	2	0	10	1	Squad	1st	6	4	0	2	9	6
1984	United States	Withdrew								Qualified as defending champion						
1988	South Korea	Did not qualify								2nd	8	6	0	2	10	3
1992	Spain	Did not qualify								See Czechoslovakia national under-21 football team						
Total		Gold medal	15	10	3	2	39	9	—	3/6	28	17	4	7	45	21

== See also ==
- Football in Czechoslovakia
- Czechoslovakia national football team
- Czechoslovakia national under-21 football team
- Czechoslovakia national under-19 football team
