= Romania Olympic football team =

National U-23 association football team

Romania
- Nickname: Tricolorii mici (The Small Tricolours)
- Association: Federația Română de Fotbal (FRF)
- Confederation: UEFA (Europe)
- Head coach: vacant
- Captain: Marius Marin
- Top scorer: Cornel Pavlovici (6 goals)
- FIFA code: ROU
First colours	Second colours

Summer Olympic Games
- Appearances: 4 (first in 1924)
- Best result: 5th place, 1964

The Romania Olympic football team represents Romania in international football competitions in Olympic Games. The selection is limited to players under the age of 23, except for three overage players. The team is controlled by the Romanian Football Federation. Having qualified for four Olympic competitions since 1924, Romania ranked fifth in 1964 (its best result).

== Players ==
=== Current squad ===
The following players were called up for the Olympic Games.

No.	Pos.	Player	Date of birth (age)	Caps	Goals	Club
12	GK	Mihai Aioani	7 November 1999 (age 27)	6	0	(Romanian Football Federation) Farul Constanța
1	GK	Mihai Popa	12 October 2000 (age 26)	1	0	(Romanian Football Federation) Astra Giurgiu
22	GK	Ștefan Târnovanu	9 May 2000 (age 26)	0	0	(Romanian Football Federation) FCSB
17	DF	Ricardo Grigore	7 April 1999 (age 27)	7	0	(Romanian Football Federation) Dinamo București
14	DF	Andrei Rațiu	20 June 1998 (age 28)	6	0	(Royal Spanish Football Federation) Huesca
4	DF	Alex Pașcanu	28 September 1998 (age 28)	5	0	(Royal Spanish Football Federation) Ponferradina
15	DF	Andrei Chindriș	12 January 1999 (age 27)	3	0	(Romanian Football Federation) Botoșani
2	DF	Radu Boboc	24 April 1999 (age 27)	4	0	(Romanian Football Federation) Farul Constanța
6	DF	Virgil Ghiță	4 June 1998 (age 28)	5	0	(Romanian Football Federation) Farul Constanța
3	DF	Florin Ștefan*	9 May 1996 (age 30)	4	0	(Romanian Football Federation) CFR Cluj
18	MF	Marco Dulca	11 May 1999 (age 27)	7	0	(Romanian Football Federation) Chindia Târgoviște
8	MF	Marius Marin	30 August 1998 (age 28)	7	0	(Italian Football Federation) Pisa
10	MF	Andrei Ciobanu	18 January 1998 (age 28)	7	0	(Romanian Football Federation) Farul Constanța
21	MF	Antonio Sefer	22 April 2000 (age 26)	5	0	(Romanian Football Federation) Rapid București
7	MF	Ion Gheorghe	10 August 1999 (age 27)	3	0	(Romanian Football Federation) Voluntari
20	MF	Alex Dobre	30 August 1998 (age 28)	5	0	(French Football Federation) Dijon
13	MF	Eduard Florescu	27 July 1997 (age 29)	4	0	(Romanian Football Federation) Botoșani
11	MF	Valentin Gheorghe	14 February 1997 (age 29)	5	0	(Romanian Football Federation) Astra Giurgiu
5	MF	Tudor Băluță	27 March 1999 (age 27)	3	0	(The Football Association) Brighton & Hove Albion
16	MF	Ronaldo Deaconu	13 May 1997 (age 29)	2	0	(Romanian Football Federation) Gaz Metan Mediaș
9	FW	George Ganea	26 May 1999 (age 27)	7	2	(Romanian Football Federation) Farul Constanța
19	FW	Andrei Sîntean	16 June 1999 (age 27)	5	0	(Romanian Football Federation) Hermannstadt

=== Recent call-ups ===
The following players have been called up for the team within the last 12 months.

Pos.	Player	Date of birth (age)	Caps	Goals	Club	Latest call-up

Notes

- ^{*} = Overage player.
- ^{INJ} = Player withdrew from the squad due to an injury
- ^{RET} = Player who retired from national team
- ^{WD} = Player withdrew from the squad

== Summer Olympics record ==
Gold medalists Silver medalists Bronze medalists

Summer Olympics										Qualification						
Year	Host	Round	Pld	W	D	L	F	A	Squad	Pos.	Pld	W	D	L	F	A
1924 to 1956		See Romania national football team								See Romania national football team						
1960	Italy	Did not qualify								3rd	4	1	1	2	2	4
1964	Japan	Fifth place	6	4	1	1	12	6	Squad	R2	5	4	0	1	10	7
1968	Mexico	Did not qualify								R2	2	0	0	2	0	2
1972	West Germany	Did not qualify								2nd	4	2	0	2	7	7
1976	Canada	Did not qualify								2nd	6	5	0	1	15	6
1980	Soviet Union	Did not qualify								R1	2	1	0	1	2	3
1984	United States	Did not qualify								2nd	6	3	2	1	7	5
1988	South Korea	Did not qualify								4th	8	2	1	5	5	17
1992	Spain	Did not qualify								See Romania national under-21 football team						
1996	United States	Did not qualify								See Romania national under-21 football team						
2000	Australia	Did not qualify								See Romania national under-21 football team						
2004	Greece	Did not qualify								See Romania national under-21 football team						
2008	China	Did not qualify								See Romania national under-21 football team						
2012	United Kingdom	Did not qualify								See Romania national under-21 football team						
2016	Brazil	Did not qualify								See Romania national under-21 football team						
2020	Japan	Group stage	3	1	1	1	1	4	Squad	See Romania national under-21 football team						
2024	France	Did not qualify								See Romania national under-21 football team						
Total		Fifth place	9	5	2	2	13	10	—	1/8	37	18	4	15	48	51

== See also ==
- Sport in Romania
  - Football in Romania
    - Women's football in Romania
- Romania men's national football team
- Romania men's national under-21 football team
- Romania women's national football team
- Romania women's national under-19 football team
- Romania women's national under-17 football team
