= South Korea national football team results (1960–1969) =

- Win Draw Loss

This is a list of football matches played by the South Korea national football team between 1960 and 1969.

== Results by year ==
Year	Pld	W	D	L	Win %
1960	11	7	3	1	63.64
1961	6	2	1	3	33.33
1962	7	6	0	1	85.71
1963	9	4	2	3	44.44
1964	9	4	1	4	44.44
1965	6	3	2	1	50.00
1966	7	3	0	4	42.86
1967	20	14	3	3	70.00
1968	6	4	0	2	66.67
1969	9	5	3	1	55.56
Total	90	52	15	23	57.78

== Matches ==
=== 1960 ===
25 April 1960 Summer Olympics (Qualification)	Taiwan	1–2	South Korea	Taipei, Republic of China
	Wong Chi-keung 41'		Cha Tae-sung 44'; Choi Chung-min 73'

30 April 1960 Summer Olympics (Qualification)	Taiwan	2–0; Awarded	South Korea	Taipei, Republic of China

6 August 1960 Merdeka Tournament	South Korea	2–0	Indonesia	Kuala Lumpur, Malaya
	Cha Tae-sung 35', 38'

8 August 1960 Merdeka Tournament	South Korea	3–1	Hong Kong	Kuala Lumpur, Malaya
	Yoo Pan-soon 41'; Woo Sang-kwon 60'; Yoo Gwang-jun 64' (pen.)		Lau Chi-lam 9'

10 August 1960 Merdeka Tournament	South Korea	0–0	South Vietnam	Kuala Lumpur, Malaya

11 August 1960 Merdeka Tournament	South Korea	3–3	Singapore	Kuala Lumpur, Malaya
	Woo Sang-kwon 11', 69'; Moon Jung-sik 76'		Sahar 20', 61'; Ibrahim 57'

14 August 1960 Merdeka Tournament	Malaya	0–0	South Korea	Kuala Lumpur, Malaya

14 October 1960 AFC Asian Cup	South Korea	5–1	South Vietnam	Seoul, South Korea
	Cho Yoon-ok 15', 66'; Woo Sang-kwon 28'; Choi Chung-min 47'; Moon Jung-sik 56'		Văn Tuyên 65'

17 October 1960 AFC Asian Cup	South Korea	3–0	Israel	Seoul, South Korea
	Cho Yoon-ok 14', 60'; Woo Sang-kwon 26'

21 October 1960 AFC Asian Cup	South Korea	1–0	Taiwan	Seoul, South Korea
	Moon Jung-sik 42'

6 November 1962 FIFA World Cup (Qualification)	South Korea	2–1	Japan	Seoul, South Korea
	Jeong Soon-cheon 39', 41'		Sasaki 21'

=== 1961 ===
11 June 1962 FIFA World Cup (Qualification)	Japan	0–2	South Korea	Tokyo, Japan
			Jeong Soon-cheon 20'; Yoo Pan-soon 71'

8 October 1962 FIFA World Cup (Qualification)	Yugoslavia	5–1	South Korea	Beograd, Yugoslavia
	Čebinac 42'; Šekularac 54', 70'; Radaković 67'; Galić 89'		Jeong Soon-cheon 82'

18 October Friendly	Turkey	1–0	South Korea	Ankara, Turkey
	Kutver 66'	(Report)		Stadium: 19 Mayıs Stadium; Attendance: 20,833; Referee: (Turkey) Cezmi Başar

22 October Friendly	Israel	1–1	South Korea	Ramat Gan, Israel
	Stelmach 86'		Jeong Soon-cheon 10'

28 October Friendly	Burma	1–3	South Korea	Yangon, Burma
	Maung Ko 77'		Choi Chung-min 13', 34'; Jeong Soon-cheon 84'

26 November 1962 FIFA World Cup (Qualification)	South Korea	1–3	Yugoslavia	Seoul, South Korea
	Yoo Pan-soon 61'		Galić 16', 88'; Jerković 29'

=== 1962 ===
26 August 1962 Asian Games (Group B)	South Korea	2–0	India	Jakarta, Indonesia
	Jeong Soon-cheon 30'; Cha Tae-sung 80'

27 August 1962 Asian Games (Group B)	South Korea	3–2	Thailand	Jakarta, Indonesia
	? 45' (o.g.); Jang Seok-woo 70'; Jo Nam-su 90' (pen.)		Asdang 13'; Yanyong 21'

30 August 1962 Asian Games (Group B)	South Korea	1–0	Japan	Jakarta, Indonesia
	Cho Yoon-ok 80'

1 September 1962 Asian Games (Semi-finals)	South Korea	2–1 (a.e.t.)	Malaya	Jakarta, Indonesia
	Jeong Soon-cheon 72'; Cha Tae-sung 97'		Arthur 70'

4 September 1962 Asian Games (Final)	South Korea	1–2	India	Jakarta, Indonesia
	Cha Tae-sung 85'		Banerjee 16'; J. Singh 20'

12 October Friendly	South Korea	2–0	Indonesia	Seoul, South Korea
	Jeong Soon-cheon 30'; Woo Sang-kwon 32'

14 October Friendly	South Korea	2–0	Indonesia	Seoul, South Korea
	Cha Tae-sung 12'; Jeong Soon-cheon 33'

=== 1963 ===
11 August 1963 Merdeka Tournament	South Korea	5–1	Thailand	Kuala Lumpur, Malaya
	Choi Myeong-gon 3'; Huh Yoon-jung 24'; Cho Yoon-ok 33', 37'; Yoo Pan-soon 78'		Yanyong 21'

13 August 1963 Merdeka Tournament	South Korea	1–1	Japan	Kuala Lumpur, Malaya
	Cha Tae-sung 64'		Tsugitani 65'

14 August 1963 Merdeka Tournament	South Korea	3–1	South Vietnam	Kuala Lumpur, Malaya
	Huh Yoon-jung 26', 43'; Cho Yoon-ok 69'		Van Quang 28'

16 August 1963 Merdeka Tournament	Malaya	3–0	South Korea	Kuala Lumpur, Malaya
	Majid 15'; Mahat 24'; Fook Yung 48'

18 August 1963 Merdeka Tournament	South Korea	0–1	Taiwan	Kuala Lumpur, Malaya
			Wong Man-wai 73'

24 August Friendly	Burma	1–1	South Korea	Yangon, Burma
	Than Htay 20'		Lee Hyeon 88'

27 August Friendly	Burma	1–3	South Korea	Yangon, Burma
	Kim Jung-suk 68' (o.g.)		Cho Yoon-ok 6', 28'; Huh Yoon-jung 88'

27 November 1964 Summer Olympics (Qualification)	South Korea	2–1	Taiwan	Seoul, South Korea
	Cho Yoon-ok 48', 73' (pen.)		Jo Nam-su 6' (o.g.)

7 December 1964 Summer Olympics (Qualification)	Taiwan	1–0	South Korea	Taipei, Republic of China
	Wong Man-wai 49'

=== 1964 ===
27 May 1964 AFC Asian Cup	South Korea	0–2 (Note: The KFA sent their B team to the 1964 AFC Asian Cup, but they recognised the B team's results as international "A" matches.)	India	Haifa, Israel
			Appalraju 2'; I. Singh 57'	Stadium: Kiryat Eliezer Stadium

30 May 1964 Summer Olympics (Qualification)	South Korea	3–0	South Vietnam	Seoul, South Korea
	Cho Sung-dal 9'; Lee Yi-woo 79'; Cho Yoon-ok 82' (pen.)

31 May 1964 AFC Asian Cup	South Korea	1–0	Hong Kong	Jerusalem, Israel
	Park Seung-ok 74'			Stadium: Hebrew University Stadium

31 May Friendly	South Korea	2–1	South Vietnam	Seoul, South Korea
	Woo Sang-kwon 35'; Cho Yoon-ok 39'		Khac Hoi 53' (pen.)

3 June 1964 AFC Asian Cup	Israel	2–1	South Korea	Ramat Gan, Israel
	Leon 20'; Tish 38'		Lee Soon-myung 79'	Stadium: Ramat Gan Stadium

28 June 1964 Summer Olympics (Qualification)	South Vietnam	2–2	South Korea	Saigon, South Vietnam
	Khanh 29', 70'		Lee Yi-woo 17', 39'

30 June Friendly	South Vietnam	1–2	South Korea	Saigon, South Vietnam
	? (?)		Cha Tae-sung (?); Cho Yoon-ok (?)

12 October 1964 Summer Olympics (Group C)	South Korea	1–6	Czechoslovakia	Saitama, Japan
	Lee Yi-woo 59'		Lichtnégl 25'; Vojta 26'; Mráz 32', 68'; Masný 43', 71'	Stadium: Omiya Park Soccer Stadium

14 October 1964 Summer Olympics (Group C)	South Korea	0–4 (Note: Not recognised as international "A" match.)	Brazil Olympic	Yokohama, Japan
			Zé Roberto 30'; Elizeu 44', 54'; Roberto 73'	Stadium: Mitsuzawa Soccer Stadium

16 October 1964 Summer Olympics (Group C)	South Korea	0–10	United Arab Republic	Tokyo, Japan
			Riad 14', 17', 40', 48', 72', 77'; Mohamed 50'; El-Fanagily 61'; Etman 66'; Hassan 78'	Stadium: Chichibunomiya Rugby Stadium

=== 1965 ===
14 August 1965 Merdeka Tournament	South Korea	2–3	Thailand	Kuala Lumpur, Malaysia
	Kim Young-bae 24'; Cho Yoon-ok 89'		Thaveepong 26'; Asdang 61', 68'

17 August 1965 Merdeka Tournament	Malaysia	0–2	South Korea	Kuala Lumpur, Malaysia
			Cho Sung-dal 30'; Cho Yoon-ok 68'

21 August 1965 Merdeka Tournament	South Korea	0–0	South Vietnam	Ipoh, Malaysia

23 August 1965 Merdeka Tournament	South Korea	1–0	India	Kuala Lumpur, Malaysia
	Kim Sam-rak 33'

25 August 1965 Merdeka Tournament	South Korea	1–0	Hong Kong	Kuala Lumpur, Malaysia
	Huh Yoon-jung 64'

28 August 1965 Merdeka Tournament	South Korea	1–1	Taiwan	Kuala Lumpur, Malaysia
	Cho Yoon-ok 18'		Cheung Chi-wai 9'

=== 1966 ===
17 August 1966 Merdeka Tournament	South Korea	1–0	Hong Kong	Kuala Lumpur, Malaysia
	Huh Yoon-jung 72'

20 August 1966 Merdeka Tournament	South Korea	2–1	Thailand	Kuala Lumpur, Malaysia
	Kim Sam-rak 19'; Jung Byung-tak 82'		Asdang 3'

23 August 1966 Merdeka Tournament	South Korea	0–2	Burma	Kuala Lumpur, Malaysia
			Aung Khin 73', 75'

25 August 1966 Merdeka Tournament	Malaysia	1–2	South Korea	Kuala Lumpur, Malaysia
	Dali 49'		? 10' (o.g.); Cho Sung-dal 23'

27 August 1966 Merdeka Tournament	South Korea	0–1	India	Kuala Lumpur, Malaysia
			Arumanayagam 29'

10 December 1966 Asian Games (Preliminary Group A)	Thailand	3–0	South Korea	Bangkok, Thailand
	Yanyong (?); Vichit (?)

12 December 1966 Asian Games (Preliminary Group A)	South Korea	0–1	Burma	Bangkok, Thailand
			Han Thien 88'

=== 1967 ===
29 July 1968 AFC Asian Cup (Qualification)	South Korea	1–1	Indonesia	Taipei, Republic of China
	Huh Yoon-jung 34'		Manan 72' (pen.)

1 August 1968 AFC Asian Cup (Qualification)	South Korea	1–2	Japan	Taipei, Republic of China
	Jung Byung-tak 52'		Kuwahara 40'; Hamada 46'

5 August 1968 AFC Asian Cup (Qualification)	South Korea	7–0	Philippines	Taipei, Republic of China
	Lee Hoe-taik 22'; Jung Byung-tak 45'; An Won-nam 54', 75'; Kim Young-bae 67'; Huh Yoon-jung 83', 85'

7 August 1968 AFC Asian Cup (Qualification)	Taiwan	1–0	South Korea	Taipei, Republic of China
	Lam Sheung-yee 69'

10 August 1967 Merdeka Tournament	South Korea	3–1	Indonesia	Kuala Lumpur, Malaysia
	Hong In-woong 20'; Huh Yoon-jung 56'; Lee Hoe-taik 73'		Kadir 50'

13 August 1967 Merdeka Tournament	South Korea	1–0	Burma	Kuala Lumpur, Malaysia
	Ju Min-hwan 3'

18 August 1967 Merdeka Tournament	South Korea	2–1	Taiwan	Kuala Lumpur, Malaysia
	Ju Min-hwan 56'; Kim Ki-bok 66'		Cheung Chi-wai 1' (pen.)

20 August 1967 Merdeka Tournament	South Korea	3–0	Singapore	Kuala Lumpur, Malaysia
	Lee Hoe-taik 47'; Cho Yoon-ok 53'; An Won-nam 79'

23 August 1967 Merdeka Tournament	Malaysia	1–3	South Korea	Kuala Lumpur, Malaysia
	Thana 31'		Jung Byung-tak 55'; Kim Ki-bok 60'; Lee Hoe-taik 69'

26 August 1967 Merdeka Tournament	South Korea	0–0	Burma	Kuala Lumpur, Malaysia

28 September 1968 Summer Olympics (Qualification)	South Korea	4–2	Taiwan	Tokyo, Japan
	Kim Ki-bok 4', 14', 79' (pen.); Lee Hoe-taik 15'		Tsang King-hung 2'; Cheung Chi-wai 44' (pen.)

1 October 1968 Summer Olympics (Qualification)	South Korea	2–0	Lebanon	Tokyo, Japan
	Jung Byung-tak 24', 58'

4 October 1968 Summer Olympics (Qualification)	South Korea	3–0	South Vietnam	Tokyo, Japan
	Huh Yoon-jung 12'; Jung Byung-tak 43'; Kim Ki-bok 88'

7 October 1968 Summer Olympics (Qualification)	Japan	3–3	South Korea	Tokyo, Japan
	Miyamoto 13'; Sugiyama 37'; Kamamoto 70'		Lee Hoe-taik 54'; Huh Yoon-jung 69', 72'

9 October 1968 Summer Olympics (Qualification)	South Korea	5–0	Philippines	Tokyo, Japan
	Kim Ki-bok 31' (?); Seo Yoon-chan (?); Huh Yoon-jung (?); Lee Hoe-taik (?)

5 November 1967 South Vietnam Independence Cup	South Korea	1–0	Hong Kong	Saigon, South Vietnam
	Huh Yoon-jung 19'

7 November 1967 South Vietnam Independence Cup	South Korea	3–1	Thailand	Saigon, South Vietnam
	Kim Ki-bok 40'; Jung Byung-tak 55'; Huh Yoon-jung 59'		Niwatana 58'

11 November 1967 South Vietnam Independence Cup	South Korea	2–1	Malaysia	Saigon, South Vietnam
	Kim Ki-bok 9', 87'		Kim Lean 39'

12 November 1967 South Vietnam Independence Cup	South Vietnam	0–3	South Korea	Saigon, South Vietnam
			Lee Hoe-taik 15'; Jung Byung-tak 25'; Huh Yoon-jung 46'

14 November 1967 South Vietnam Independence Cup	South Korea	2–3	Australia	Saigon, South Vietnam
	Lee Young-geun 1'; Huh Yoon-jung 85'		Vojtek 35'; Abonyi 53'; Warren 84'

=== 1968 ===
12 August 1968 Merdeka Tournament	South Korea	3–2	Singapore	Kuala Lumpur, Malaysia
	Lee Hoe-taik 54'; Kim Ki-bok 57'; Huh Yoon-jung 88'		Kim Swee 39'; Kim Lye 39'

14 August 1968 Merdeka Tournament	South Korea	2–1	Taiwan	Kuala Lumpur, Malaysia
	Huh Yoon-jung 57', 66'		Chan Chiu-ki 8'

17 August 1968 Merdeka Tournament	South Korea	2–4	Indonesia	Kuala Lumpur, Malaysia
	Kim Ki-bok 42', 87'		Idris 3'; Kadir 15', 48'; Sihasale 60'

21 August 1968 Merdeka Tournament	South Korea	2–1	Thailand	Kuala Lumpur, Malaysia
	Kim Ki-bok 61'; Lee Hoe-taik 78'		Udomsilp 75' (pen.)

24 August 1968 Merdeka Tournament	South Korea	1–0	India	Kuala Lumpur, Malaysia
	Kim Ki-bok 89'

27 August Friendly	Singapore	4–3	South Korea	Singapore
	Kim Siak 6'; Majid 10', 15'; Mathew 90'		Kim Ki-bok 20'; Jeong Kang-ji 75', 86' (pen.)

=== 1969 ===
12 October 1970 FIFA World Cup (Qualification)	South Korea	2–2	Japan	Seoul, South Korea
	Kim Ki-bok 8'; Park Soo-il 38'		Miyamoto 33'; Kuwahara 50'

14 October 1970 FIFA World Cup (Qualification)	South Korea	1–2	Australia	Seoul, South Korea
	Lee Yi-woo 44'		Watkiss 37'; McColl 79'

18 October 1970 FIFA World Cup (Qualification)	South Korea	2–0	Japan	Seoul, South Korea
	Jeong Kang-ji 17', 40'

20 October 1970 FIFA World Cup (Qualification)	South Korea	1–1	Australia	Seoul, South Korea
	Park Soo-il 26'		Baartz 58'

19 November 1969 King's Cup	South Korea	2–0	Laos	Bangkok, Thailand
	Choi Sang-cheol 62'; Jeong Byeong-tak 83'

21 November 1969 King's Cup	South Korea	2–0	Malaysia	Bangkok, Thailand
	Jeong Kang-ji 7'; Lee Hoe-taik 85'

23 November 1969 King's Cup	Thailand	0–0	South Korea	Bangkok, Thailand

26 November 1969 King's Cup	South Korea	3–0	South Vietnam	Bangkok, Thailand
	Jeong Gyu-poong 40', 56'; Jeong Byeong-tak 41'

28 November 1969 King's Cup	South Korea	1–0	Indonesia	Bangkok, Thailand
	Jeong Kang-ji 16'

== See also ==
- South Korea national football team results
- South Korea national football team
