= Thailand national football team results (1960–1979) =

This article lists the results for the Thailand national football team between 1960 and 1979.

- Only record the results that affect the FIFA/Coca-Cola World Ranking. See FIFA 'A' matches criteria.

== 1960 ==
Date	Opponent	Result	Score	Venue	Competition
5 August 1960	Pakistan	L	0–7	(Federation of Malaya) Kuala Lumpur, Malaya	1960 Merdeka Tournament
7 August 1960	Malaya	L	2–8	(Malaysia) Kuala Lumpur, Malaya	1960 Merdeka Tournament

== 1961 ==
Date	Opponent	Result	Score	Venue	Competition
6 August 1961	Hong Kong	L	1–2	(Federation of Malaya) Malaya	1961 Merdeka Tournament
9 August 1961	Indonesia	L	1–2	(Federation of Malaya) Malaya	1961 Merdeka Tournament
9 August 1961	Singapore	L	3–5	(Federation of Malaya) Malaya	1961 Merdeka Tournament
16 August 1961	South Vietnam	L	1–2	Singapore	1961 Singapore Festival
4 November 1961	South Korea	L	1–4	Thailand	International Friendly
11 December 1961	South Vietnam	D	0–0	(Myanmar) Rangoon, Burma	1961 Southeast Asian Peninsular Games - Group A
13 December 1961	Laos	W	5–2	(Myanmar) Rangoon, Burma	1961 Southeast Asian Peninsular Games- Group A
14 December 1961	Indonesia	D	2–2	(Myanmar) Rangoon, Burma	1961 Southeast Asian Peninsular Games - Semi-finals
16 December 1961	South Vietnam	D	1–1	(Myanmar) Rangoon, Burma	1961 Southeast Asian Peninsular Games - Bronze medal match

== 1962 ==
Date	Opponent	Result	Score	Venue	Competition
25 July 1962	Taiwan	W	4–0	Thailand	International Friendly
25 August 1962	Japan	L	1–3	Jakarta, Indonesia	1962 Asian Games - Group B
27 August 1962	South Korea	L	2–3	Jakarta, Indonesia	1962 Asian Games - Group B
28 August 1962	India	L	1–4	Jakarta, Indonesia	1962 Asian Games - Group B
27 October 1962	Malaya	L	2–4	Saigon, South Vietnam	1962 Vietnam Independence Cup
28 October 1962	South Vietnam	W	1–0	Saigon, South Vietnam	1962 Vietnam Independence Cup
30 October 1962	Indonesia	L	0–7	Saigon, South Vietnam	1962 Vietnam Independence Cup
16 November 1962	Sweden	L	1–2	Thailand	International Friendly

== 1963 ==
Date	Opponent	Result	Score	Venue	Competition
10 August 1963	Japan	L	1–4	(Federation of Malaya) Malaya	1963 Merdeka Tournament
11 August 1963	South Korea	L	1–5	(Federation of Malaya) Malaya	1963 Merdeka Tournament
14 August 1963	Malaya	D	2–2	(Federation of Malaya) Malaya	1963 Merdeka Tournament
16 August 1963	Taiwan	D	2–2	(Federation of Malaya) Malaya	1963 Merdeka Tournament
17 August 1963	South Vietnam	L	2–3	(Federation of Malaya) Malaya	1963 Merdeka Tournament
12 October 1963	Malaysia	D	1–1	Kuala Lumpur, Malaysia	1964 Olympic Games qualification
16 November 1963	Malaysia	W	3–2	Bangkok, Thailand	1964 Olympic Games qualification
7 December 1963	Hong Kong	D	3–3	Saigon, South Vietnam	1964 AFC Asian Cup qualification
11 December 1963	Malaysia	L	1–3	Saigon, South Vietnam	1964 AFC Asian Cup qualification
14 December 1963	South Vietnam	L	0–3	Saigon, South Vietnam	1964 AFC Asian Cup qualification

== 1964 ==
Date	Opponent	Result	Score	Venue	Competition
31 May 1964	North Korea	L	0–2	(Myanmar) Yangon, Burma	1964 Olympic Games qualification
28 July 1964	North Korea	L	0–5	(Myanmar) Yangon, Burma	1964 Olympic Games qualification
22 August 1964	Malaysia	L	0–3	Kuala Lumpur, Malaysia	1964 Merdeka Tournament
29 August 1964	India	L	1–2	Ipoh, Malaysia	1964 Merdeka Tournament
1 September 1964	Cambodia	W	1–0	Kuala Lumpur, Malaysia	1964 Merdeka Tournament
5 September 1964	Malaysia	D	1–1	Ipoh, Malaysia	1964 Merdeka Tournament

== 1965 ==
Date	Opponent	Result	Score	Venue	Competition
19 May 1965	Norway	L	0–7	Norway	International Friendly
14 August 1965	South Korea	W	3–2	Malaysia	1965 Merdeka Tournament
20 August 1965	Taiwan	L	2–3	Malaysia	1965 Merdeka Tournament
22 August 1965	Burma	D	1–1	Malaysia	1965 Merdeka Tournament
27 August 1965	Hong Kong	D	1–1	Malaysia	1965 Merdeka Tournament
13 November 1965	South Vietnam	L	0–4	Saigon, South Vietnam	1965 Vietnam Independence Cup
14 November 1965	Malaysia	L	1–2	Saigon, South Vietnam	1965 Vietnam Independence Cup
15 December 1965	South Vietnam	W	2–1	Kuala Lumpur, Malaysia	1965 SEAP Games - Group stage
18 December 1965	South Vietnam	W	2–0	Kuala Lumpur, Malaysia	1965 SEAP Games - Semi-finals
22 December 1965	Burma	D	2–2	Kuala Lumpur, Malaysia	1965 SEAP Games - Gold medal match

== 1966 ==
Date	Opponent	Result	Score	Venue	Competition
15 August 1966	Taiwan	L	1–2	Malaysia	1966 Merdeka Tournament
17 August 1966	Burma	L	0–3	Malaysia	1966 Merdeka Tournament
19 August 1966	Malaysia	D	0–0	Malaysia	1966 Merdeka Tournament
21 August 1966	South Korea	L	1–2	Malaysia	1966 Merdeka Tournament
20 August 1976	Hong Kong	D	2–2	Malaysia	1966 Merdeka Tournament
3 November 1966	Malaysia	D	1–1	Saigon, South Vietnam	1966 Vietnam Independence Cup
5 November 1966	South Vietnam	L	1–4	Saigon, South Vietnam	1966 Vietnam Independence Cup
10 December	South Korea	W	3–0	Bangkok, Thailand	1966 Asian Games - Preliminary round - Group A
14 December 1966	Burma	D	1–1	Bangkok, Thailand	1966 Asian Games - Preliminary round - Group A
15 December 1966	Singapore	L	0–2	Bangkok, Thailand	1966 Asian Games - Quarterfinals - Group A
17 December 1966	Japan	L	1–5	Bangkok, Thailand	1966 Asian Games - Quarterfinals - Group A

== 1967 ==
Date	Opponent	Result	Score	Venue	Competition
24 March 1967	South Vietnam	L	0–1	Hong Kong	1968 AFC Asian Cup qualification
26 March 1967	Singapore	W	4–1	Hong Kong	1968 AFC Asian Cup qualification
31 March 1967	Malaysia	W	1–0	Hong Kong	1968 AFC Asian Cup qualification
2 April 1967	Hong Kong	L	0–2	Hong Kong	1968 AFC Asian Cup qualification
10 August 1967	Hong Kong	L	0–1	Kuala Lumpur, Malaysia	1967 Merdeka Tournament
12 August 1967	India	D	1–1	Kuala Lumpur, Malaysia	1967 Merdeka Tournament
19 August 1967	South Vietnam	L	2–5	Ipoh, Malaysia	1967 Merdeka Tournament
19 August 1967	Malaysia	L	0–1	Ipoh, Malaysia	1967 Merdeka Tournament
4 November 1967	Malaysia	L	2–3	Saigon, South Vietnam	1967 Vietnam Independence Cup
7 November 1967	South Korea	L	1–3	Saigon, South Vietnam	1967 Vietnam Independence Cup
10 November 1967	Hong Kong	W	5–1	Saigon, South Vietnam	1967 Vietnam Independence Cup
10 December 1967	Malaysia	W	4–0	Bangkok, Thailand	1967 SEAP Games - Group A
12 December 1967	Burma	L	0–1	Bangkok, Thailand	1967 SEAP Games - Group A
14 December 1967	South Vietnam	L	0–5	Bangkok, Thailand	1967 SEAP Games - Semi-finals
15 December 1967	Laos	W	5–2	Bangkok, Thailand	1967 SEAP Games - Bronze medal match

== 1968 ==
Date	Opponent	Result	Score	Venue	Competition
14 January 1968	Iraq	L	0–4	Bangkok, Thailand	1968 Summer Olympics Qualifiers – Group 2
18 January 1968	Indonesia	W	1–0	Bangkok, Thailand	1968 Summer Olympics Qualifiers – Group 2
20 January 1968	Iraq	W	2–1	Bangkok, Thailand	1968 Summer Olympics Qualifiers – Group 2
24 January 1968	Indonesia	W	2–1	Bangkok, Thailand	1968 Summer Olympics Qualifiers – Group 2
11 August 1968	Hong Kong	D	0–0	Kuala Lumpur, Malaysia	1968 Merdeka Tournament
14 August 1968	Burma	D	0–0	Ipoh, Malaysia	1968 Merdeka Tournament
15 August 1968	South Vietnam	L	2–3	Ipoh, Malaysia	1968 Merdeka Tournament
17 August 1968	Malaysia	W	4–1	Kuala Lumpur, Malaysia	1968 Merdeka Tournament
19 August 1968	India	W	1–0	Kuala Lumpur, Malaysia	1978 Merdeka Tournament
19 August 1968	South Korea	L	1–2	Kuala Lumpur, Malaysia	1968 Merdeka Tournament
?? October 1968	Ethiopia	L	0–7	Mexico	International Friendly
?? October 1968	Nigeria	L	2–7	Mexico	International Friendly
14 October 1968	Bulgaria	L	0–7	León, Mexico	1968 Olympics Games - Group D
16 October 1968	Guatemala	L	1–4	León, Mexico	1968 Olympics Games - Group D
18 October 1968	Czechoslovakia	L	0–8	León, Mexico	1968 Olympics Games - Group D
20 November 1968	Singapore	W	3–0	Bangkok, Thailand	1968 King's Cup
24 November 1968	Laos	W	1–0	Bangkok, Thailand	1968 King's Cup
29 November 1968	Burma	L	0–2	Bangkok, Thailand	1968 King's Cup
1 December 1968	Malaysia	W	6–0	Bangkok, Thailand	1968 King's Cup

== 1969 ==
Date	Opponent	Result	Score	Venue	Competition
2 May 1969	New Zealand	L	0–3	Thailand	International Friendly
30 October 1969	Malaysia	L	0–1	Malaysia	1969 Merdeka Tournament
1 November 1969	India	L	0–4	Malaysia	1969 Merdeka Tournament
1 November 1969	India	L	0–1	Malaysia	1969 Merdeka Tournament
19 November 1969	Malaysia	D	2–2	Bangkok, Thailand	1969 King's Cup
21 November 1969	Laos	L	3–4	Bangkok, Thailand	1969 King's Cup
23 November 1969	South Korea	D	0–0	Bangkok, Thailand	1969 King's Cup
8 December 1969	Burma	D	1–1	(Myanmar) Rangoon, Burma	1969 SEAP Games - Group A
10 December 1969	Malaysia	W	3–0	(Myanmar) Rangoon, Burma	1969 SEAP Games - Semi-finals
21 November 1969	Burma	L	0–3	(Myanmar) Rangoon, Burma	1969 SEAP Games - Gold medal match

== 1970 ==
Date	Opponent	Result	Score	Venue	Competition
31 July 1970	South Korea	D	0–0	Kuala Lumpur, Malaysia	1970 Merdeka Tournament
2 August 1970	Hong Kong	L	0–2	Kuala Lumpur, Malaysia	1970 Merdeka Tournament
4 August 1970	Japan	D	0–0	Kuala Lumpur, Malaysia	1970 Merdeka Tournament
8 August 1970	Singapore	W	5–4	Kuala Lumpur, Malaysia	1970 Merdeka Tournament
10 August 1970	Indonesia	L	3–6	Kuala Lumpur, Malaysia	1970 Merdeka Tournament
29 October 1970	Indonesia	W	1–0	Saigon, South Vietnam	1970 Vietnam Independence Cup
31 October 1970	Malaysia	W	4–1	Saigon, South Vietnam	1970 Vietnam Independence Cup
1 November 1970	South Vietnam	L	0–1	Saigon, South Vietnam	1970 Vietnam Independence Cup
8 November 1970	Laos	W	1–0	Bangkok, Thailand	1970 King's Cup
10 November 1970	Singapore	W	3–1	Bangkok, Thailand	1970 King's Cup
12 November 1970	Hong Kong	W	2–1	Bangkok, Thailand	1970 King's Cup
14 November 1970	South Korea	D	0–0	Bangkok, Thailand	1970 King's Cup
18 November 1970	Indonesia	W	2–1	Bangkok, Thailand	1970 King's Cup
20 November 1970	South Korea	L	0–1	Bangkok, Thailand	1970 King's Cup
10 December 1970	India	D	2–2	Bangkok, Thailand	1970 Asian Games – Group A
13 December 1970	South Vietnam	W	1–0	Bangkok, Thailand	1970 Asian Games – Group A
15 December 1970	South Korea	L	1–2	Bangkok, Thailand	1970 Asian Games – Quarterfinals - Group Aa
16 December 1970	Burma	D	0–0	Bangkok, Thailand	1970 Asian Games – Quarterfinals - Group Aa
19 December 1970	Indonesia	L	0–1	Bangkok, Thailand	1970 Asian Games – 5th place match

== 1971 ==
Date	Opponent	Result	Score	Venue	Competition
2 May 1971	South Korea	L	0–1	Seoul, South Korea	1971 President's Cup
5 May 1971	Khmer Republic	W	4–3	Seoul, South Korea	1971 President's Cup
8 May 1971	Malaysia	L	1–4	Seoul, South Korea	1971 President's Cup
15 May 1971	Malaysia	W	3–0	(Taiwan) Republic of China	3 Nations in Taiwan
17 May 1971	Taiwan	W	2–1	(Taiwan) Republic of China	3 Nations in Taiwan
21 May 1971	Khmer Republic	D	0–0	Bangkok, Thailand	1972 AFC Asian Cup qualification
24 May 1971	Brunei	W	10–0	Bangkok, Thailand	1972 AFC Asian Cup qualification
26 May 1971	Indonesia	L	0–1	Bangkok, Thailand	1972 AFC Asian Cup qualification
30 May 1971	Malaysia	W	1–0	Bangkok, Thailand	1972 AFC Asian Cup qualification
1 June 1971	Khmer Republic	W	4–2	Bangkok, Thailand	1972 AFC Asian Cup qualification
6 June 1971	India	W	1–0	Jakarta, Indonesia	1971 Jakarta Anniversary Tournament
11 June 1971	Indonesia	D	0–0	Jakarta, Indonesia	1971 Jakarta Anniversary Tournament
12 June 1971	Khmer Republic	L	0–3	Jakarta, Indonesia	1971 Jakarta Anniversary Tournament
26 June 1971	Hong Kong	L	0–6	Hong Kong	International Friendly
8 August 1971	Taiwan	L	0–4	Kuala Lumpur, Malaysia	1971 Merdeka Tournament
10 August 1971	South Vietnam	L	2–4	Kuala Lumpur, Malaysia	1971 Merdeka Tournament
14 August 1971	Malaysia	W	2–0	Kuala Lumpur, Malaysia	1971 Merdeka Tournament
17 August 1971	Philippines	W	3–1	Kuala Lumpur, Malaysia	1971 Merdeka Tournament
24 August 1971	Philippines	W	1–0	Singapore	Friendly tournament
26 August 1971	South Vietnam	W	2–1	Singapore	Friendly tournament
28 October 1971	Singapore	W	1–0	Saigon, South Vietnam	1971 Vietnam Independence Cup
30 October 1971	South Vietnam	L	0–3	Saigon, South Vietnam	1971 Vietnam Independence Cup
31 October 1971	Singapore	L	1–3	Saigon, South Vietnam	1971 Vietnam Independence Cup
7 November 1971	Singapore	W	2–0	Bangkok, Thailand	1971 King's Cup
11 November 1971	South Vietnam	L	0–1	Bangkok, Thailand	1971 King's Cup
14 November 1971	Indonesia	W	1–0	Bangkok, Thailand	1971 King's Cup
16 November 1971	South Korea	L	0–1	Bangkok, Thailand	1971 King's Cup
12 December 1971	Khmer Republic	D	1–1	Kuala Lumpur, Malaysia	1971 South East Asian Peninsula Games
14 December 1971	Malaysia	L	2–4	Kuala Lumpur, Malaysia	1971 South East Asian Peninsula Games
15 December 1971	Laos	W	3–0	Kuala Lumpur, Malaysia	1971 South East Asian Peninsula Games
17 December 1971	Burma	L	1–3	Kuala Lumpur, Malaysia	1971 South East Asian Peninsula Games
18 December 1971	South Vietnam	D	0–0	Kuala Lumpur, Malaysia	1971 South East Asian Peninsula Games

== 1972 ==
Date	Opponent	Result	Score	Venue	Competition
20 March 1972	Indonesia	L	0–4	(Myanmar) Rangoon, Burma	1972 Olympic Games qualification
26 March 1972	Ceylon	W	5–0	(Myanmar) Rangoon, Burma	1972 Olympic Games qualification
29 March 1972	Burma	L	0–7	(Myanmar) Rangoon, Burma	1972 Olympic Games qualification
1 April 1972	Israel	D	0–0	(Myanmar) Rangoon, Burma	1972 Olympic Games qualification
4 April 1972	Burma	L	0–1	(Myanmar) Rangoon, Burma	1972 Olympic Games qualification
8 May 1972	Kuwait	L	0–2	Bangkok, Thailand	1972 AFC Asian Cup - Group allocation matches
11 May 1972	Iraq	D	1–1	Bangkok, Thailand	1972 AFC Asian Cup - Group A
13 May 1972	Iran	L	2–3	Bangkok, Thailand	1972 AFC Asian Cup - Group A
17 May 1972	South Korea	D	1–1(a.e.t.); 1–2(pen.)	Bangkok, Thailand	1972 AFC Asian Cup - Semi-finals
19 May 1972	Khmer Republic	D	2–2	Bangkok, Thailand	1972 AFC Asian Cup - Third place
8 June 1972	Khmer Republic	L	0–2	Jakarta, Indonesia	1972 Jakarta Anniversary Tournament
10 June 1972	Singapore	D	1–1	Jakarta, Indonesia	1972 Jakarta Anniversary Tournament
12 June 1972	Philippines	L	0–1	Jakarta, Indonesia	1972 Jakarta Anniversary Tournament
15 June 1972	South Korea	L	2–3	Jakarta, Indonesia	1972 Jakarta Anniversary Tournament
15 July 1972	Singapore	W	1–0	Kuala Lumpur, Malaysia	1972 Merdeka Tournament
17 July 1972	South Korea	L	0–2	Kuala Lumpur, Malaysia	1972 Merdeka Tournament
19 July 1972	India	L	2–3	Kuala Lumpur, Malaysia	1972 Merdeka Tournament
23 July 1972	Hong Kong	D	2–2	Kuala Lumpur, Malaysia	1972 Merdeka Tournament
29 July 1972	Philippines	W	4–0	Kuala Lumpur, Malaysia	1972 Merdeka Tournament
20 September 1972	South Korea	L	0–3	Seoul, South Korea	1972 President's Cup
22 September 1972	Malaysia	D	1–1	South Korea	1972 President's Cup
24 September 1972	Khmer Republic	D	0–0	South Korea	1972 President's Cup
28 September 1972	Singapore	W	4–1	South Korea	1972 President's Cup
18 November 1972	Singapore	W	4–0	Bangkok, Thailand	1972 King's Cup
20 November 1972	Malaysia	L	0–2	Bangkok, Thailand	1972 King's Cup
24 November 1972	Indonesia	W	3–0	Bangkok, Thailand	1972 King's Cup
26 November 1972	South Korea	W	1–0	Bangkok, Thailand	1972 King's Cup
28 November 1972	Malaysia	L	0–1	Bangkok, Thailand	1972 King's Cup

== 1973 ==
Date	Opponent	Result	Score	Venue	Competition
13 May 1973	South Vietnam	L	0–1	Seoul, South Korea	1974 FIFA World Cup qualification
19 May 1973	South Korea	L	0–4	Seoul, South Korea	1974 FIFA World Cup qualification
21 May 1973	Israel	L	0–6	Seoul, South Korea	1974 FIFA World Cup qualification
23 May 1973	Malaysia	L	0–2	Seoul, South Korea	1974 FIFA World Cup qualification
27 July 1973	Bangladesh	D	2–2; 6–5(pen.)	Kuala Lumpur, Malaysia	1973 Merdeka Tournament
29 July 1973	India	L	0–2	Kuala Lumpur, Malaysia	1973 Merdeka Tournament
1 August 1973	Malaysia	D	2–2	Kuala Lumpur, Malaysia	1973 Merdeka Tournament
7 August 1973	Khmer Republic	W	4–1	Kuala Lumpur, Malaysia	1973 Merdeka Tournament
12 August 1973	Bangladesh	W	2–0	Kuala Lumpur, Malaysia	1973 Merdeka Tournament
1 September 1973	Singapore	L	0–1	Kallang, Singapore	1973 South East Asian Peninsula Games
2 September 1973	Malaysia	D	1–1	Kallang, Singapore	1973 South East Asian Peninsula Games
22 September 1973	Burma	D	2–2	Seoul, South Korea	1973 President's Cup
24 September 1973	Malaysia	L	1–5	Seoul, South Korea	1973 President's Cup
15 December 1973	Burma	W	2–1	Bangkok, Thailand	1973 King's Cup
17 December 1973	Laos	W	5–0	Bangkok, Thailand	1973 King's Cup
19 December 1973	Singapore	W	3–0	Bangkok, Thailand	1973 King's Cup
23 December 1973	Malaysia	L	0–1	Bangkok, Thailand	1973 King's Cup
25 December 1973	Burma	W	1–0	Bangkok, Thailand	1973 King's Cup

== 1974 ==
Date	Opponent	Result	Score	Venue	Competition
16 May 1974	Burma	L	1–2	Seoul, South Korea	1974 President's Cup
24 July 1974	India	L	2–4	Ipoh, Malaysia	1974 Merdeka Tournament
26 July 1974	Indonesia	W	2–1	Ipoh, Malaysia	1974 Merdeka Tournament
30 July 1974	Singapore	D	1–1	Ipoh, Malaysia	1974 Merdeka Tournament
1 August 1974	Malaysia	L	2–3	Ipoh, Malaysia	1974 Merdeka Tournament
4 August 1974	Hong Kong	L	0–1	Ipoh, Malaysia	1974 Merdeka Tournament
2 September 1974	Kuwait	L	2–3	Tehran, Iran	1974 Asian Games - Preliminary round - Group A
4 September 1974	South Korea	L	0–1	Tehran, Iran	1974 Asian Games - Preliminary round - Group A
3 November 1974	Khmer Republic	D	2–2	Saigon, South Vietnam	1974 Vietnam Independence Cup
9 November 1974	South Vietnam	L	2–3	Saigon, South Vietnam	1974 Vietnam Independence Cup
10 November 1974	Taiwan	L	2–3	Saigon, South Vietnam	1974 Vietnam Independence Cup
13 November 1974	China	L	2–3	Bangkok, Thailand	International Friendly
15 November 1974	China	L	0–2	Bangkok, Thailand	International Friendly
10 December 1974	Malaysia	L	0–2	Bangkok, Thailand	1974 King's Cup
12 December 1974	Laos	W	8–1	Bangkok, Thailand	1974 King's Cup
14 December 1974	Singapore	W	2–1	Bangkok, Thailand	1974 King's Cup
16 December 1974	Malaysia	W	4–1	Bangkok, Thailand	1974 King's Cup
18 December 1974	Khmer Republic	W	1–0	Bangkok, Thailand	1974 King's Cup
20 December 1974	South Korea	L	1–3	Bangkok, Thailand	1974 King's Cup

== 1975 ==
Date	Opponent	Result	Score	Venue	Competition
15 March 1975	Indonesia	W	3–1	Bangkok, Thailand	1976 AFC Asian Cup qualification
18 March 1975	Malaysia	L	0–1	Bangkok, Thailand	1976 AFC Asian Cup qualification
21 March 1975	South Vietnam	W	4–0	Bangkok, Thailand	1976 AFC Asian Cup qualification
24 March 1975	South Korea	W	1–0	Bangkok, Thailand	1976 AFC Asian Cup qualification
26 March 1975	Malaysia	W	2–1	Bangkok, Thailand	International Friendly
15 May 1975	Burma	L	1–4	Seoul, South Korea	1975 President's Cup
27 May 1975	Lebanon	L	1–2	Bangkok, Thailand	International Friendly
12 June 1975	Indonesia	L	0–5	Jakarta, Indonesia	1975 Jakarta Anniversary Tournament
13 June 1975	Malaysia	L	0–1	Jakarta, Indonesia	1975 Jakarta Anniversary Tournament
?? July 1975	Macau	W	2–0	(Macau) Macao	International Friendly
3 July 1975	China	D	2–2	China	International Friendly
30 July 1975	Burma	L	0–1	Kuala Lumpur, Malaysia	1975 Merdeka Tournament
2 August 1975	Bangladesh	D	1–1	Kuala Lumpur, Malaysia	1975 Merdeka Tournament
4 August 1975	Malaysia	L	0–1	Kuala Lumpur, Malaysia	1975 Merdeka Tournament
7 August 1975	South Korea	L	0–6	Kuala Lumpur, Malaysia	1975 Merdeka Tournament
9 August 1975	Indonesia	L	1–2	Kuala Lumpur, Malaysia	1975 Merdeka Tournament
11 August 1975	Japan	L	0–4	Kuala Lumpur, Malaysia	1975 Merdeka Tournament
15 August 1975	Hong Kong	L	0–3	Kuala Lumpur, Malaysia	1975 Merdeka Tournament
9 December 1975	Malaysia	D	1–1	Bangkok, Thailand	1975 South East Asian Peninsula Games - Group A
12 December 1975	Singapore	D	2–2	Bangkok, Thailand	1975 South East Asian Peninsula Games - Semi Finals
16 December 1975	Malaysia	W	2–1	Bangkok, Thailand	1975 South East Asian Peninsula Games - Finals
20 December 1975	Indonesia	W	3–2	Bangkok, Thailand	1975 King's Cup
23 December 1975	South Korea	W	2–1	Bangkok, Thailand	1975 King's Cup
26 December 1975	Singapore	L	0–1	Bangkok, Thailand	1975 King's Cup
29 December 1975	Malaysia	W	1–0	Bangkok, Thailand	1975 King's Cup

== 1976 ==
Date	Opponent	Result	Score	Venue	Competition
1 January 1976	Burma	D	0–0	Bangkok, Thailand	1975 King's Cup
9 August 1976	Malaysia	D	0–0	Kuala Lumpur, Malaysia	1976 Merdeka Tournament
11 August 1976	Burma	L	0–1	Kuala Lumpur, Malaysia	1976 Merdeka Tournament
14 August 1976	India	W	6–2	Kuala Lumpur, Malaysia	1976 Merdeka Tournament
16 August 1976	Japan	D	2–2	Kuala Lumpur, Malaysia	1976 Merdeka Tournament
18 August 1976	Indonesia	W	1–0	Kuala Lumpur, Malaysia	1976 Merdeka Tournament
20 August 1976	South Korea	L	1–2	Kuala Lumpur, Malaysia	1976 Merdeka Tournament
16 September 1976	Burma	L	0–2	Seoul, South Korea	1976 President's Cup
18 September 1976	New Zealand	L	1–3	Seoul, South Korea	1976 President's Cup
15 December 1976	South Korea	W	2–1	Bangkok, Thailand	1976 King's Cup
19 December 1976	Singapore	W	6–0	Bangkok, Thailand	1976 King's Cup
25 December 1976	Malaysia	D	1–1	Bangkok, Thailand	1976 King's Cup

== 1977 ==
Date	Opponent	Result	Score	Venue	Competition
9 February 1977	Israel	D	2–2	Bangkok, Thailand	International Friendly
27 February 1977	Singapore	L	0–2	Singapore	1978 FIFA World Cup qualification
1 March 1977	Malaysia	L	4–6	Singapore	1978 FIFA World Cup qualification
5 March 1977	Hong Kong	L	1–2	Singapore	1978 FIFA World Cup qualification
7 March 1977	Indonesia	L	2–3	Singapore	1978 FIFA World Cup qualification
18 July 1977	Burma	L	0–3	Kuala Lumpur, Malaysia	1977 Merdeka Tournament
20 July 1977	South Korea	L	1–4	Kuala Lumpur, Malaysia	1977 Merdeka Tournament
23 July 1977	Libya	D	2–2	Kuala Lumpur, Malaysia	1977 Merdeka Tournament
25 July 1977	Iraq	L	0–5	Kuala Lumpur, Malaysia	1977 Merdeka Tournament
29 July 1977	Burma	D	1–1	Kuala Lumpur, Malaysia	1977 Merdeka Tournament
3 September 1977	South Korea	L	0-4	Seoul, South Korea	1977 President's Cup
7 September 1977	India	W	4–0	Busan, South Korea	1977 President's Cup
14 September 1977	China	L	2–5	China	International Friendly
15 September 1977	Malaysia	D	1–1	Seoul, South Korea	1977 President's Cup
28 October 1977	Singapore	W	2–0	Bangkok, Thailand	1977 King's Cup
31 October 1977	India	D	1–1	Bangkok, Thailand	1977 King's Cup
6 November 1977	Malaysia	L	1–2	Bangkok, Thailand	1977 King's Cup
20 November 1977	Singapore	W	2–0	Kuala Lumpur, Malaysia	1977 Southeast Asian Games - Group B
22 November 1977	Burma	L	0–3	Kuala Lumpur, Malaysia	1977 Southeast Asian Games - Group B
25 November 1977	Indonesia	D	1–1	Kuala Lumpur, Malaysia	1977 Southeast Asian Games - Semi finals
26 November 1977	Malaysia	L	0–2	Kuala Lumpur, Malaysia	1977 Southeast Asian Games - final

== 1978 ==
Date	Opponent	Result	Score	Venue	Competition
23 May 1978	Japan	L	0–3	Zuiho, Japan	International Friendly
15 June 1978	Indonesia	L	0–1	Jakarta, Indonesia	1978 Jakarta Anniversary Tournament
17 June 1978	Singapore	W	3–1	Jakarta, Indonesia	1978 Jakarta Anniversary Tournament
20 June 1978	South Korea	L	0–1	Jakarta, Indonesia	1978 Jakarta Anniversary Tournament
21 June 1978	Malaysia	D	1–1	Jakarta, Indonesia	1978 Jakarta Anniversary Tournament
23 June 1978	Malaysia	D	3–3	Jakarta, Indonesia	1978 Jakarta Anniversary Tournament
14 July 1978	South Korea	L	0–3	Kuala Lumpur, Malaysia	1978 Merdeka Tournament
16 July 1978	Malaysia	L	0–2	Kuala Lumpur, Malaysia	1978 Merdeka Tournament
18 July 1978	Singapore	W	2–1	Kuala Lumpur, Malaysia	1978 Merdeka Tournament
20 July 1978	Syria	W	3–1	Kuala Lumpur, Malaysia	1978 Merdeka Tournament
22 July 1978	Indonesia	W	3–0	Kuala Lumpur, Malaysia	1978 Merdeka Tournament
24 July 1978	Iraq	L	0–1	Kuala Lumpur, Malaysia	1978 Merdeka Tournament
26 July 1978	Japan	L	0–4	Kuala Lumpur, Malaysia	1978 Merdeka Tournament
10 September 1978	Indonesia	W	2–1	Jeonju, South Korea	1978 President's Cup
11 December 1978	Burma	W	2–1	Bangkok, Thailand	1978 Asian Games - Preliminary round - Group B
15 December 1978	North Korea	L	0–3	Bangkok, Thailand	1978 Asian Games - Preliminary round - Group B
17 December 1978	Malaysia	W	2–1	Bangkok, Thailand	1978 Asian Games - Semifinals - Group 2
18 November 1978	China	L	1–4	Bangkok, Thailand	1978 Asian Games - Semifinals - Group 2
19 November 1978	South Korea	L	1–3	Bangkok, Thailand	1978 Asian Games - Semifinals - Group 2

== 1979 ==
Date	Opponent	Result	Score	Venue	Competition
1 May 1979	Indonesia	W	3–1	Bangkok, Thailand	1980 AFC Asian Cup qualification
2 May 1979	Turkey "B"	L	0–2	Medan, Indonesia	Exhibition match
4 May 1979	Sri Lanka	W	4–0	Bangkok, Thailand	1980 AFC Asian Cup qualification
6 May 1979	Singapore	W	4–0	Bangkok, Thailand	1980 AFC Asian Cup qualification
8 May 1979	Hong Kong	W	1–0	Bangkok, Thailand	1980 AFC Asian Cup qualification
12 May 1979	North Korea	L	0–1	Bangkok, Thailand	1980 AFC Asian Cup qualification
14 May 1979	Hong Kong	L	1–2	Bangkok, Thailand	1980 AFC Asian Cup qualification
29 June 1979	Japan	L	1–2	Kuala Lumpur, Malaysia	1979 Merdeka Tournament
1 July 1979	Malaysia	L	2–4	Kuala Lumpur, Malaysia	1979 Merdeka Tournament
3 July 1978	Burma	L	0–2	Kuala Lumpur, Malaysia	1979 Merdeka Tournament
5 July 1979	Singapore	D	1–1	Kuala Lumpur, Malaysia	1979 Merdeka Tournament
8 July 1979	Indonesia	L	1–2	Kuala Lumpur, Malaysia	1979 Merdeka Tournament
9 September 1979	Iraq	L	0–1	Seoul, South Korea	1979 President's Cup
22 September 1979	Burma	W	1–0	Jakarta, Indonesia	1979 Southeast Asian Games - Group stage
23 September 1979	Indonesia	W	3–1	Jakarta, Indonesia	1979 Southeast Asian Games - Group stage
25 September 1979	Singapore	D	2–2	Jakarta, Indonesia	1979 Southeast Asian Games - Group stage
28 September 1979	Malaysia	L	0–1	Jakarta, Indonesia	1979 Southeast Asian Games - Group stage
29 September 1979	Indonesia	D	0–0(a.e.t.); 1–3(pen.)	Jakarta, Indonesia	1979 Southeast Asian Games - Second place play-off
22 November 1978	Sri Lanka	W	5–1	Bangkok, Thailand	1979 King's Cup
