= Japan 15–0 Philippines =

- Event: Football at the 1968 Summer Olympics – Men's Asian Qualifiers Group 1
Japan	Philippines
(Japan)	(Philippines)
15	0
- Date: 27 September 1967
- Venue: National Olympic Stadium, Tokyo, Japan
- Referee: Atef Sinan (Lebanon)
- Attendance: 7,939

On 27 September 1967, the national association football teams of Japan and the Philippines faced each other in a qualification match for the 1968 Summer Olympics. The teams were in Group 1, where South Korea, Lebanon, South Vietnam and Taiwan (Republic of China) were also included. The top team in the group qualified for the Olympics. This match resulted in Japan's largest victory and the Philippines' worst defeat in an international football match. The Philippines' previous record for its worst defeat was 1–15 against Malaya (present-day Malaysia) at the 1962 Asian Games. Japan also suffered its worst defeat to the Philippines with the score 2–15 on 10 May 1917, but that is not recognized as an official international match by the Japan Football Association.

== Details ==
27 September 1967
19:40 (UTC+9)
1968 Summer Olympics qualification – Group 1

Japan	15–0	Philippines
Sugiyama 4', 75'; Ogi 5'; Kamamoto 15', 16', 26', 43', 64', 89'; Miyamoto 20', 30', 40', 46'; Watanabe 63'; Kuwahara 78'	Report

National Olympic Stadium, Tokyo
Attendance: 7,939
Referee: Atef Sinan (Lebanon)

Line-up
GK	1	Kenzo Yokoyama	(substituted off) ?'
DF	2	Hiroshi Katayama
DF	7	Kiyoshi Tomizawa
DF		Hisao Kami
DF	4	Yoshitada Yamaguchi
MF	8	Takaji Mori
MF	12	Teruki Miyamoto
MF	9	Aritatsu Ogi	(substituted off) 46'
FW	13	Masashi Watanabe
FW	15	Kunishige Kamamoto
FW	17	Ryuichi Sugiyama
Substitutes:
GK		Koji Funamoto	(substituted on) ?'
FW	14	Yasuyuki Kuwahara	(substituted on) 46'
Manager:
(Japan) Ken Naganuma

Line-up
GK	Eduardo Fuertes
Ruberto Shaoton
Eduardo Ragudameo
Eufemio Agustin	(substituted off) ?'
Gary Bafro
Ben McElroy
James Co
Federico Veloso
Eduardo Pacheco
Jordan Guansuon
Carlo Chan
Substitutes:
Mariano Chu	(substituted on) ?'
Manager:
(Philippines) Emilio Pacheco

== Final standings ==
Japan won all its other matches with other teams in the group except with South Korea which ended with a draw. The Philippines failed to win any matches in the whole duration of the qualifying tournament. The Philippines also conceded two other defeats with the opposing sides scoring two-digit goal difference. The matches were against South Vietnam; 10–0, and Lebanon; 11–1. South Vietnam's match with the Philippines was its largest victory in an international football match. Lebanon's result was also its largest victory in an international football match. Japan managed to qualify for the Football event at the 1968 Summer Olympics.

Pos	Team	Pld	W	D	L	GF	GA	GD	Pts	Qualification
1	Japan (H)	5	4	1	0	26	4	+22	9	Qualification for 1968 Summer Olympics
2	South Korea	5	4	1	0	17	5	+12	9	
3	Lebanon	5	2	1	2	18	9	+9	5	
4	South Vietnam	5	2	1	2	14	5	+9	5	
5	Taiwan	5	1	0	4	11	18	−7	2	
6	Philippines	5	0	0	5	3	48	−45	0	

Source: RSSSF
(H) Hosts
