= Football at the 1968 Summer Olympics – Men's qualification =

1968 Summer Olympics – Men's Football Qualifiers
Tournament details
- Dates: 22 March 1967 – 30 June 1968
- Teams: 69 (from 5 confederations)

Tournament statistics
- Matches played: 110
- Goals scored: 359 (3.26 per match)

The 1968 Summer Olympics football qualification was the qualifying process which decide the 14 teams that would join hosts Mexico and holders Hungary, who received an automatic spot, at the 1968 Summer Olympics football tournament.

== Qualified teams ==
Team	Method of qualification	Date of qualification	Total times qualified	Last time qualified	Current consecutive appearances	Previous best performance (Note: Includes all participations by a competing nation at the Summer Olympics (clubs representing nations, olympic teams, full national teams, etc.))
Mexico	Hosts	18 October 1963	2	1964	2	First round (1928, 1948, 1964)
Hungary	Holders	23 October 1964	2	1964	3	Gold medal (1952, 1964)
Japan	Asia Group 1 winners	10 October 1967	3	1964	2	Quarter-finals (1964)
Thailand	Asia Group 2 winners	22 January 1968	2	1956	1	First round (1956)
Israel	Asia Group 3 winners	22 March 1968	1	—	1	—
Spain	Europe Group 4 winners	1 April 1968	1	—	1	—
Brazil	CONMEBOL final group winners	9 April 1968	3	1964	3	Quarter-finals (1952)
Colombia	CONMEBOL final group runners-up	9 April 1968	1	—	1	—
Bulgaria	Europe Group 2 winners	24 April 1968	3	1960	1	Bronze medal (1956)
Nigeria	Africa Group 2 winners	4 May 1968	1	—	1	—
France	Europe Group 3 winners	12 May 1968	2	1960	1	Silver medal (1900)
El Salvador	CONCACAF final round winner	26 May 1968	1	—	1	—
Czechoslovakia	Europe Group 1 winners	1 June 1968	2	1964	2	Silver medal (1964)
Guatemala	CONCACAF final round winner	2 June 1968	1	—	1	—
Guinea	Africa Group 1 winners	30 June 1968	1	—	1	—
~~Morocco~~ (Note: Morocco withdrew due to refusing to play against Israel in the final tournament, and were replaced by Ghana.)	Africa Group 3 winners	30 June 1968	2	1964	1	First round (1964)

== Qualification process ==
- Africa: 3
- Asia: 3
- Europe: 4
- North America: 2
- South America: 2
- Hosts: 1
- Holders: 1

=== Summary of qualification ===
Region	Available slots in finals	Teams started	Teams eliminated	Teams qualified	Qualifying start date	Qualifying end date
Africa	3	17	14	3	27 September 1967	22 March 1968
Asia	3	11	8	3	9 April 1967	30 June 1968
Europe	4 or 5	20	16	5	22 March 1967	1 June 1968
North America	2 or 3	13	11	3	21 May 1967	2 June 1968
South America	2	8	6	2	19 March 1968	9 April 1968
Total	16	69	55	16	22 March 1967	30 June 1968

== Europe ==
Four groups of five teams with group winners qualifying for the Summer Olympics finals.

=== Group 1 ===
Team 1	Agg.	Team 2	1st leg	2nd leg
First round
Soviet Union	w/o	Albania	—	—
Second round
Poland	1–3	Soviet Union	0–1	1–2
Czechoslovakia	w/o	Yugoslavia	—	—
Final round
Soviet Union	3–5	Czechoslovakia	3–2	0–3

=== Group 2 ===
Team 1	Agg.	Team 2	1st leg	2nd leg
First round
Greece	0–10	East Germany	0–5	0–5
Second round
Turkey	2–6	Bulgaria	2–3	0–3
East Germany	2–0	Romania	1–0	1–0
Final round
Bulgaria	6–4	East Germany	4–1	2–3

=== Group 3 ===
Team 1	Agg.	Team 2	1st leg	2nd leg
First round
Finland	1–0	Netherlands	0–0	1–0
Second round
Austria	4–2	Switzerland	4–1	0–1
Finland	2–4	France	1–1	1–3
Final round
France	4–2	Austria	3–1	1–1

=== Group 4 ===
Team 1	Agg.	Team 2	1st leg	2nd leg
First round
Iceland	4–6	Spain	1–1	3–5
Second round
West Germany	1–2	Great Britain	0–2	1–0
Spain	w/o	Italy	—	—
Final round
Spain	1–0	Great Britain	1–0	0–0

== South America ==
- Group stage: Two groups of four teams played single round-robin matches, the top two teams of each group advanced to the final group.
- Final group: Four teams played single round-robin matches, the top two teams qualified for the Summer Olympics.

=== Final positions (final group) ===
Pos	Team	Pld	W	D	L	GF	GA	GD	Pts	Qualification
1	Brazil	3	2	0	1	6	2	+4	4	Qualification for 1968 Summer Olympics
2	Colombia	3	2	0	1	6	5	+1	4	Qualification for 1968 Summer Olympics
3	Uruguay	3	1	1	1	5	6	−1	3	
4	Paraguay	3	0	1	2	5	9	−4	1	

Source: RSSSF

== North and Central America ==
- First round: 10 teams played home-and-away over two legs. The five winners advanced to the second round.
- Second round: 8 teams played home-and-away over two legs (5 which advanced from the first round, 3 automatically entered). The four winners advanced to the second round.
- Final round: 4 teams played home-and-away over two legs. The two winners qualified for the 1968 Summer Olympics.

=== Final round ===
Team 1	Agg.	Team 2	1st leg	2nd leg
El Salvador	4–1	Trinidad and Tobago	2–0	2–1
Guatemala	3–3 (l)	Costa Rica	1–0	2–3

== Africa ==
Three groups of five to six teams with group winners qualifying for the Summer Olympics finals.

=== Group 1 ===
Team 1	Agg.	Team 2	1st leg	2nd leg
First round
Libya	4–2	Niger	2–0	2–2
Gabon	1–6	Guinea	0–0	1–6
Second round
Guinea	w/o	United Arab Republic	—	—
Libya	2–3	Algeria	1–2	1–1
Final round
Guinea	5–4	Algeria	3–2	2–2

=== Group 2 ===
Team 1	Agg.	Team 2	1st leg	2nd leg
First round
Nigeria	w/o	Uganda	—	—
Madagascar	6–2	Tanzania	4–2	2–0
Second round
Nigeria	2–2 (l)	Sudan	1–0	1–2
Madagascar	4–8	Ethiopia	1–0	3–8
Final round
Nigeria	3–2	Ethiopia	3–1	0–1

=== Group 3 ===
Team 1	Agg.	Team 2	1st leg	2nd leg
First round
Cameroon	w/o	Mali	—	—
Second round
Morocco	1–1 (l)	Tunisia	1–1	0–0
Cameroon	3–3	Ghana	1–0	2–3
Second round play-off
Cameroon	w/o	Ghana		
Final round
Morocco	3–2	Ghana	1–1	2–1

== Asia ==
Three groups of six teams played single round-robin matches. The winner of each group qualified for the 1968 Summer Olympics.

=== Final positions ===
Group 1

Pos	Team	Pld	Pts
1	Japan (H)	5	9
2	South Korea	5	9
3	Lebanon	5	5
4	South Vietnam	5	5
5	Taiwan	5	2
6	Philippines	5	0

Source: RSSSF
(H) Hosts
Group 2

Pos	Team	Pld	Pts
1	Thailand (H)	4	6
2	Iraq	4	3
3	Indonesia	4	3
4	Hong Kong	0	0
5	Malaysia	0	0
6	Pakistan	0	0

Source: RSSSF
(H) Hosts
Group 3

Pos	Team	Pld	Pts
1	Israel (H)	2	4
2	Ceylon	2	0
3	Burma	0	0
4	India	0	0
5	Iran	0	0
6	North Korea	0	0

Source: RSSSF
(H) Hosts
