= 1968 AFC Asian Cup qualification =

Tournament details
- Dates: 22 March – 19 November 1967
- Teams: 14 (from 1 confederation)

Tournament statistics
- Matches played: 26
- Goals scored: 86 (3.31 per match)

The qualification for the 1968 AFC Asian Cup consisted of 15 teams in four zones. The winner of each group would join hosts Iran in the final tournament.

== Zones ==
Central zone	Eastern zone	Western zone 1	Western zone 2
Hong Kong; Malaysia; Singapore; South Vietnam; Thailand	Indonesia; Japan; Philippines; South Korea; Taiwan	~~Afghanistan~~*; Israel; ~~Kuwait*~~	Burma; Cambodia; ~~Ceylon~~*; India; Pakistan

- * Withdrew

== Central zone ==
All matches held in Hong Kong.

Pos	Team	Pld	W	D	L	GF	GA	GD	Pts	Qualification
1	Hong Kong (H)	4	4	0	0	9	1	+8	8	1968 AFC Asian Cup
2	Thailand	4	2	0	2	5	4	+1	4	
3	South Vietnam	4	2	0	2	4	4	0	4	
4	Malaysia	4	1	1	2	4	5	−1	3	
5	Singapore	4	0	1	3	2	10	−8	1	

22 March 1967

Hong Kong	2–0	South Vietnam
Au Pang Nin 14' (pen.), 35' (pen.)

Government Stadium, Hong Kong

24 March 1967

Malaysia	1–1	Singapore
H. Abdullah 60' (o.g.)		Ariff 26'

Government Stadium, Hong Kong

24 March 1967

Thailand	0–1	South Vietnam

Government Stadium, Hong Kong

26 March 1967

Thailand	4–1	Singapore
Muankasem 15' (?); Penglee 83'		Quah Kim Swee 63'

Government Stadium, Hong Kong
Attendance: 12,000

26 March 1967

Hong Kong	3–1	Malaysia
Wallis (?); Kwong Ying Ying 13', 58'		Thanabalan (?)

Government Stadium, Hong Kong

29 March 1967

South Vietnam	0–2	Malaysia
		Salim 20'; Karathu 24'

Government Stadium, Hong Kong

29 March 1967

Hong Kong	2–0	Singapore
Yuen Kuen To 36' (pen.); Kwong Yuen Yong 52'

Government Stadium, Hong Kong

31 March 1967

Thailand	1–0	Malaysia
Muankasem 38'

Government Stadium, Hong Kong

2 April 1967

Hong Kong	2–0	Thailand
Yuen Kuen To 33' (pen.); Kwong Yin Ying 79'

Government Stadium, Hong Kong

2 April 1967
12:45 (UTC+8)

South Vietnam	3–0	Singapore
Trương Văn Tư 29', 34', 65'

Government Stadium, Hong Kong

== Eastern zone ==
All matches held in Taiwan.

Pos	Team	Pld	W	D	L	GF	GA	GD	Pts	Qualification
1	Taiwan (H)	4	3	1	0	15	4	+11	7	1968 AFC Asian Cup
2	Japan	4	3	1	0	8	4	+4	7	
3	South Korea	4	1	1	2	9	4	+5	3	
4	Indonesia	4	1	1	2	10	6	+4	3	
5	Philippines	4	0	0	4	0	24	−24	0	

27 July 1967

Taiwan	2–2	Japan

Taipei Municipal Stadium, Taipei

27 July 1967

South Korea	1–1	Indonesia
Huh Yoon-Jung 34'		Manan 69' (pen.)

Taipei Municipal Stadium, Taipei

1 August 1967

Taiwan	9–0	Philippines

Taipei Municipal Stadium, Taipei

1 August 1967

Japan	2–1	South Korea
Kuwahara 40'; Hamada Hiroshi 46'		Jung Byung-tak 52'

Taipei Municipal Stadium, Taipei

3 August 1967

Taiwan	3–2	Indonesia
Wong Chi-keung 5'; Mok Chun-wah 25'; Cheung Chi-day 43'		Soentoro 53', 73'

Taipei Municipal Stadium, Taipei

3 August 1967

Japan	2–0	Philippines

Taipei Municipal Stadium, Taipei

5 August 1967

Japan	2–1	Indonesia

Taipei Municipal Stadium, Taipei

5 August 1967

South Korea	7–0	Philippines
Lee Hoe-taik 22'; Jung Byung-tak 45'; An Won-nam 54', 75'; Kim Young-bae 67'; Huh Yoon-jung 83', 85'

Taipei Municipal Stadium, Taipei

7 August 1967

Taiwan	1–0	South Korea
Lam Sheung Yee 73'

Taipei Municipal Stadium, Taipei
Attendance: 25,000

7 August 1967

Indonesia	6–0	Philippines
Soentoro 38', 47' (?); Sihasale 52'; Andjiek Alinurdin 56'; Djunaedi Abdillah 68'

Taipei Municipal Stadium, Taipei

== Western zone 1 ==
All the others withdrew, so Israel qualified automatically.

== Western zone 2 ==
All matches held in Burma.

Pos	Team	Pld	W	D	L	GF	GA	GD	Pts	Qualification
1	Burma (H)	3	3	0	0	5	0	+5	6	1968 AFC Asian Cup
2	Cambodia	3	2	0	1	4	2	+2	4	
3	Pakistan	3	0	1	2	1	4	−3	1	
4	India	3	0	1	2	2	6	−4	1	

12 November 1967

Burma	2–0	India
Suk Bahadur 51'; Aung Khin 88'	Report

Bogyoke Aung San Stadium, Rangoon

13 November 1967

Cambodia	1–0	Pakistan
Sieng Tara 80' (pen.)	Report

Bogyoke Aung San Stadium, Rangoon

15 November 1967

Pakistan	1–1	India
Bakhsh 50'	Report	Chatterjee 1'

Bogyoke Aung San Stadium, Rangoon

16 November 1967

Burma	1–0	Cambodia
Win Maung 22'	Report

Bogyoke Aung San Stadium, Rangoon

18 November 1967

Cambodia	3–1	India
Sea Cheng Eang 35'; Sieng Tara 57', 60'	Report	Kannan 89'

Bogyoke Aung San Stadium, Rangoon

19 November 1967

Burma	2–0	Pakistan
Suk Bahadur 61'; Hla Kyi 83'	Report

Bogyoke Aung San Stadium, Rangoon

== Qualified teams ==
Team	Qualified as	Qualified on	Previous appearance
Iran	Hosts	N/A	0 (debut)
Hong Kong	Central Zone winners	2 April 1967	2 (1956, 1964)
Taiwan	Eastern zone winners	7 August 1967	1 (1960)
Israel	Western Zone 1 winners (automatically qualified)	1967	3 (1956, 1960, 1964)
Burma	Western Zone 2 winners	16 November 1967	0 (debut)

=== Goalscorers ===
There were 86 goals scored in 26 matches, for an average of 3.31 goals per match.

4 goals

- (Thailand) Praderm Muankasem

3 goals

- (Hong Kong) Kwong Yin Ying
- (South Vietnam) Trương Văn Tư
- (Cambodia) Sieng Tara

2 goals

- (Myanmar) Suk Bahadur
- (Hong Kong) Au Pang Nin
- (Hong Kong) Yuen Kuen To

1 goal

- (Myanmar) Aung Khin
- (Myanmar) Hla Kyi
- (Myanmar) Win Maung
- (Cambodia) Sea Cheng Eang
- (Hong Kong) Ken Wallis
- (Hong Kong) Kwong Yuen Yong
- (India) Ashok Chatterjee
- (India) Poongam Kannan
- (Malaysia) Agus Salim
- (Malaysia) Maruthaiah Karathu
- (Malaysia) Nadesan Thanabalan
- (Pakistan) Maula Bakhsh
- (Singapore) Majid Ariff
- (Singapore) Quah Kim Swee
- (Taiwan) Lam Sheung Yee
- (Thailand) Kevit Penglee

1 own goal

- (Singapore) Hussein Abdullah
