= Football at the 1968 Summer Olympics – Men's Asian Qualifiers – Group 1 =

The 1968 Summer Olympics football qualification – Asia Group 1, hosted by Japan, was one of the three Asian groups in the Summer Olympics football qualification tournament to decide which teams would qualify for the 1968 Summer Olympics football finals tournament in Mexico. Group 1 consisted of six teams: Japan, Lebanon, Philippines, South Korea, South Vietnam and Taiwan. The teams played against each other in a round-robin format. The group winners, Japan, qualified directly for the Summer Olympics football finals.

== Standings ==
Pos	Team	Pld	W	D	L	GF	GA	GD	Pts	Qualification
1	Japan (H)	5	4	1	0	26	4	+22	9	Qualification for 1968 Summer Olympics
2	South Korea	5	4	1	0	17	5	+12	9	
3	Lebanon	5	2	1	2	18	9	+9	5	
4	South Vietnam	5	2	1	2	14	5	+9	5	
5	Taiwan	5	1	0	4	11	18	−7	2	
6	Philippines	5	0	0	5	3	48	−45	0	

Source: RSSSF
(H) Hosts

== Matches ==
All times are Central Standard Time (UTC+9).

27 September 1967
19:40

Japan	15–0	Philippines
Sugiyama 4', 75'; Ogi 5'; Kamamoto 15', 16', 26', 43', 64', 89'; Miyamoto 20', 30', 40', 46'; Watanabe 63'; Kuwahara 78'	Report

National Stadium, Tokyo
Attendance: 7,939
Referee: Atef Sinan (Lebanon)
27 September 1967

South Korea	4–2	Taiwan

National Stadium, Tokyo
28 September 1967

Lebanon	1–1	South Vietnam

National Stadium, Tokyo
Attendance: 3,000

30 September 1967

Japan	4–0	Taiwan
Kamamoto 25', 67', 75'; Ogi 59'	Report

National Stadium, Tokyo
Attendance: 7,181
Referee: Đậu Văn Dư (South Vietnam)
1 October 1967

South Korea	2–0	Lebanon

National Stadium, Tokyo
Attendance: 902
Referee: Kenichi Fukushima (Japan)
1 October 1967

South Vietnam	10–0	Philippines

National Stadium, Tokyo

3 October 1967

Taiwan	7–2	Philippines

National Stadium, Tokyo
3 October 1967

South Korea	3–0	South Vietnam

National Stadium, Tokyo
3 October 1967

Japan	3–1	Lebanon
Ogi 29'; Kamamoto 49'; Mori 84'	Report	Altounian 24'

National Stadium, Tokyo
Attendance: 2,693
Referee: Eriberto Cruz (Philippines)

6 October 1967

Lebanon	11–1	Philippines

National Stadium, Tokyo
Attendance: 500
7 October 1967

Japan	3–3	South Korea
Miyamoto 13'; Sugiyama 37'; Kamamoto 70'	Report	Lee Hoe-taik 48'; Huh Yoon-jung 64', 68'

National Stadium, Tokyo
Attendance: 45,789
Referee: Tang Sun Cheung (Taiwan)
7 October 1967

South Vietnam	3–0	Taiwan

National Stadium, Tokyo

9 October 1967

Lebanon	5–2	Taiwan

National Stadium, Tokyo
10 October 1967

South Korea	5–0	Philippines

National Stadium, Tokyo
10 October 1967

Japan	1–0	South Vietnam
Sugiyama 50'	Report

National Stadium, Tokyo
Attendance: 23,010
Referee: Tang Sun Cheung (Taiwan)

== Goalscorers ==
There were 89 goals scored in 15 matches, for an average of 5.93 goals per match.

11 goals

- (Japan national football team) Kunishige Kamamoto

5 goals

- (Japan national football team) Teruki Miyamoto

4 goals

- (Japan national football team) Ryuichi Sugiyama

3 goals

- (Japan national football team) Aritatsu Ogi

1 goal

- (Japan national football team) Masashi Watanabe
- (Japan national football team) Yasuyuki Kuwahara
- (Japan national football team) Takaji Mori
- (Lebanon national football team) Levon Altounian
- (South Korea national football team) Lee Hoe-taik
- (South Korea national football team) Huh Yoon-jung
