= Football at the 1968 Summer Olympics – Men's European Qualifiers – Group 3 =

The 1968 Summer Olympics football qualification – Europe Group 3 was one of the four European groups in the Summer Olympics football qualification tournament to decide which teams would qualify for the 1968 Summer Olympics football finals tournament in Mexico. Group 3 consisted of five teams: Austria, Finland, France, Netherlands, Switzerland. The teams played home-and-away knockout matches. France qualified for the Summer Olympics football finals after defeating Austria 4–2 on aggregate in the final round.

== Summary ==
Team 1	Agg.	Team 2	1st leg	2nd leg
First round
Finland	1–0	Netherlands	0–0	1–0
Second round
Austria	4–2	Switzerland	4–1	0–1
Finland	2–4	France	1–1	1–3
Final round
France	4–2	Austria	3–1	1–1

== First round ==
24 May 1967
19:00 UTC+2

Finland	0–0	Netherlands
	Report

Helsinki Olympic Stadium, Helsinki
Attendance: 19,181
Referee: Anvar Zverev (Soviet Union)
14 June 1967

Netherlands	0–1	Finland
	Report	Laine 61'

Nieuw Monnikenhuize, Arnhem
Attendance: 5,000
Referee: Hubert Berguet (Belgium)

Finland won 1–0 on aggregate and advanced to the second round.

== Second round ==
15 October 1967

Switzerland	1–0	Austria
Heutschi 15'

Stadion Breite, Schaffhausen
Attendance: 3,000
Referee: Marcel Zeimes (Luxembourg)

5 November 1967

Austria	4–1	Switzerland
Burgholzer 51', 90+5'; Voggenberger 66', 90+3'		Heutschi 35'

Praterstadion, Wien
Attendance: 20,000
Referee: Karl Riegg (Germany)

Austria won 4–2 on aggregate and advanced to the final round.

15 October 1967
14:00 UTC+2

Finland	1–1	France
Laine 22'	Report	Hallet 23'

Helsinki Olympic Stadium, Helsinki
Attendance: 7,691
Referee: Alexandru Pîrvu (Romania)
29 October 1967

France	3–1	Finland
Case 25'; Zix 70'; Horlaville 72'	Report	Lindholm 30'

Attendance: 5,702
Referee: Joaquim Campos (Portugal)

France won 4–2 on aggregate and advanced to the final round.

== Final round ==
1 May 1968

France	3–1	Austria
Périgaud 11'; Horlaville 71', 73'		Milanovic 65' (pen.)

Parc des Princes, Paris
Attendance: 13,509
Referee: Anvar Zverev (Soviet Union)
12 May 1968

Austria	1–1	France

Lindenstadion, Eisenstadt

France won 4–2 on aggregate and qualified for the Summer Olympics.

== Goalscorers ==
There were 19 goals scored in 8 matches, for an average of 2.38 goals per match.

3 goals

- (France national football team) Daniel Horlaville

2 goals

- (Switzerland Olympic football team) Franz Heutschi
- (Austria Olympic football team) Helmut Voggenberger
- (Austria Olympic football team) Werner Burgholzer
- (Finland Olympic football team) Aulis Laine

1 goal

- (France Olympic football team) Gerard Hallet
- (France Olympic football team) Marc-Kanyan Case
- (Finland Olympic football team) Tommy Lindholm
- (France Olympic football team) Frédéric Zix
- (France Olympic football team) Daniel Périgaud
- (Austria Olympic football team) Ferdinand Milanovic
