= Katsuyoshi =

- Gender: Male

Origin
- Origin: Japanese
- Meaning: Different meanings depending on the kanji used

Katsuyoshi (written: 健仁, 勝良 or 勝義) is a masculine Japanese given name. Notable people with the name include:

- Katsuyoshi Kuwahara (桑原 勝義; born 1944), Japanese footballer
- Katsuyoshi Shinto (信藤 健仁; born 1960), Japanese footballer
- Katsuyoshi Tomori (友利 勝良; born 1954), Japanese golfer
- Katsuyoshi Yatabe (谷田部 勝義; born 1956), Japanese screenwriter, anime director and sound director
