= Gerardo Ortega (footballer) =

Spanish footballer

Personal information
- Full name: Gerardo Ortega de Francisco
- Date of birth: 13 October 1947 (age 79)
- Place of birth: Morón de Almazán, Spain
- Height: 1.69 m (5 ft 7 in)
- Position: Striker

Senior career*
Years	Team	Apps	(Gls)
1967–1968	Rayo Vallecano	27	(10)
1968–1969	Real Madrid	0	(0)
1969–1971	Calvo Sotelo	53	(19)
1971–1973	Logroñés	26	(4)
1973–1975	Murcia	18	(3)
1975–1976	Villena		
1977–1978	Albacete		
1978–1979	Almansa		
1979–1980	Albacete		

International career
1968	Spain	5	(1)
- * Club domestic league appearances and goals

Gerardo Ortega de Francisco (born 13 October 1947) is a Spanish footballer who played as a striker.

He scored three goals from 18 La Liga games for Real Murcia over the course of two seasons.

== Club career ==
Born in Morón de Almazán in the province of Soria, Castile and León, Ortega played with Rayo Vallecano, Real Madrid, Calvo Sotelo, Logroñés, Real Murcia, Villena, Almansa and Albacete. With the second club he played only one match in 1968–69 season against the Cypriot club AEL in the second leg of the preliminary round of the 1968–69 European Cup, scoring the fifth goal in his team's 6–0 victory, as they won by the same score in the first leg.

Most of Ortega's appearances during his career were in the lower divisions, Ortega made his La Liga debut on 17 February 1974 with Real Murcia as he came on as a substitute for Vera Palmés in the 70th minute of a 1–2 loss away to Sporting Gijón.

== International ==
He competed in the men's tournament at the 1968 Summer Olympics. He earned five caps and scored one goal.

=== International goals ===
#	Date	Venue	Opponent	Score	Result	Competition
1.	27 March 1968	Nova Creu Alta, Sabadell, Catalonia, Spain	Great Britain	1–0	1–0	Qualification 1968 Summer Olympics
