= Eduardo Fuertes =

Filipino footballer (1943–2014)

Personal information
- Date of birth: 18 April 1943
- Place of birth: Janiuay, Iloilo, Philippine Commonwealth
- Date of death: 27 July 2014 (aged 71)
- Place of death: United States
- Position: Goalkeeper

International career
Years	Team	Apps	(Gls)
c. 1963	Philippines youth		
c. 1967	Philippines		

Eduardo Fuertes (18 April 1943 – 27 July 2014) was a Filipino international footballer who played as a goalkeeper.

== Career ==
Fuertes was born on 18 April 1943, in the town of Janiuay in Iloilo, Philippines to Crispin and Enriqueta Fuertes. As an association football player, he was part of the Philippine youth national team which participated at the 1963 AFC Youth Championship where he was conferred a 5th Asian Youth Football Tournament player award. He was named Mr. Football by the Philippine Sportswriters Association in 1967. He also played for the senior national team that played at the 1968 Summer Olympics qualifiers in 1967. Fuertes played in the record 0-15 defeat to Japan.

For 18 years he also served in the Philippine Navy. He later decided to reside in the United States in Bremerton, Washington and worked as a Data Processor at Puget Sound Naval Shipyard.

He died on 27 July 2014, and was survived by his wife Enestina Fuertes whom he was married for 42 years.
