= Suk Bahadur =

Gurkha footballer

Suk Bahadur ဆွပ်ခ် ဗဟာဒူး သာပါ

Personal information
- Full name: Suk Bahadur Thapa
- Date of birth: 15 May 1935
- Place of birth: Pyawbwe, Mandalay, British Burma
- Date of death: 19 August 2001 (aged 68)
- Height: 1.68 m (5 ft 6 in)
- Positions: Striker; right winger

Senior career*
Years	Team	Apps	(Gls)
1952	Shan State FC		
1952–1964	Army FC		

International career
1952–1970	Burma		
Medal record
Representing Burma
Men's Football
Asian Games
Gold medal – first place	1966 Bangkok	Team
Gold medal – first place	1970 Bangkok	Team
Bronze medal – third place	1954 Manila	Team
AFC Asian Cup
Runner-up	1968 Iran	Team
- * Club domestic league appearances and goals

Suk Bahadur Thapa (Burmese: ဆွပ်ခ် ဗဟာဒူး သာပါ) was a Burmese footballer who served as the major for 4th Infantry Battalion (4th Gurkha) of Myanmar Army. He was also a dominating tennis and field hockey player as well as the national 100-meter sprint champion which he held under 11 seconds. Bahadur is a Gurkha from the Shan State in Myanmar.

== Early career ==
In 1952, Myanmar Football Federation launched inaugural States and Divisions Football Championship to draw out talented footballers from around the country. Along with many new faces, Bahadur was selected from title winning Shan state football team. Later he played for Army football team where he teamed up with future national teammates; Hla Maung, Ba Kyu, Maung Thaung, Hla Aye, Guan Shein, Ba Shwe, David Kyaw San.

== Club career ==
Suk Bahadur began his footballing journey at a young age, honing his skills and developing his unique playing style. He has been described as a natural on the pitch, possessing exceptional dribbling skills, lightning-fast footwork, and a keen eye for goal.

Bahadur's career started in 1952 when he first made his mark on the national stage, playing for the Shan state team. Dazzling spectators with his skills as a forward, it was due to his exploits on the field that Shan won the state-level championship that year. He was soon recruited to play for the Myanmar national team, where he played both as a right winger and a forward and helped his country to their first success in football when they won the bronze medal in the 1954 Asian Games.

As a captain, Suk Bahadur was known for his discipline, dedication, and passion for the game. He was a strict taskmaster who demanded the best from his teammates.

Myanmar won the Asian Games Gold medal twice, in 1966 and 1970 and were the runners-up in the AFC Asian Cup in 1968. They won the Southeast Asian Games thrice, in 1965, 1967, and 1969 and triumphed in the Merdeka Cup twice, in 1964 and 1967.

Bahadur also served as the major for the 4th Infantry Battalion (4th Gurkha) of the Myanmar Army.

== International career ==
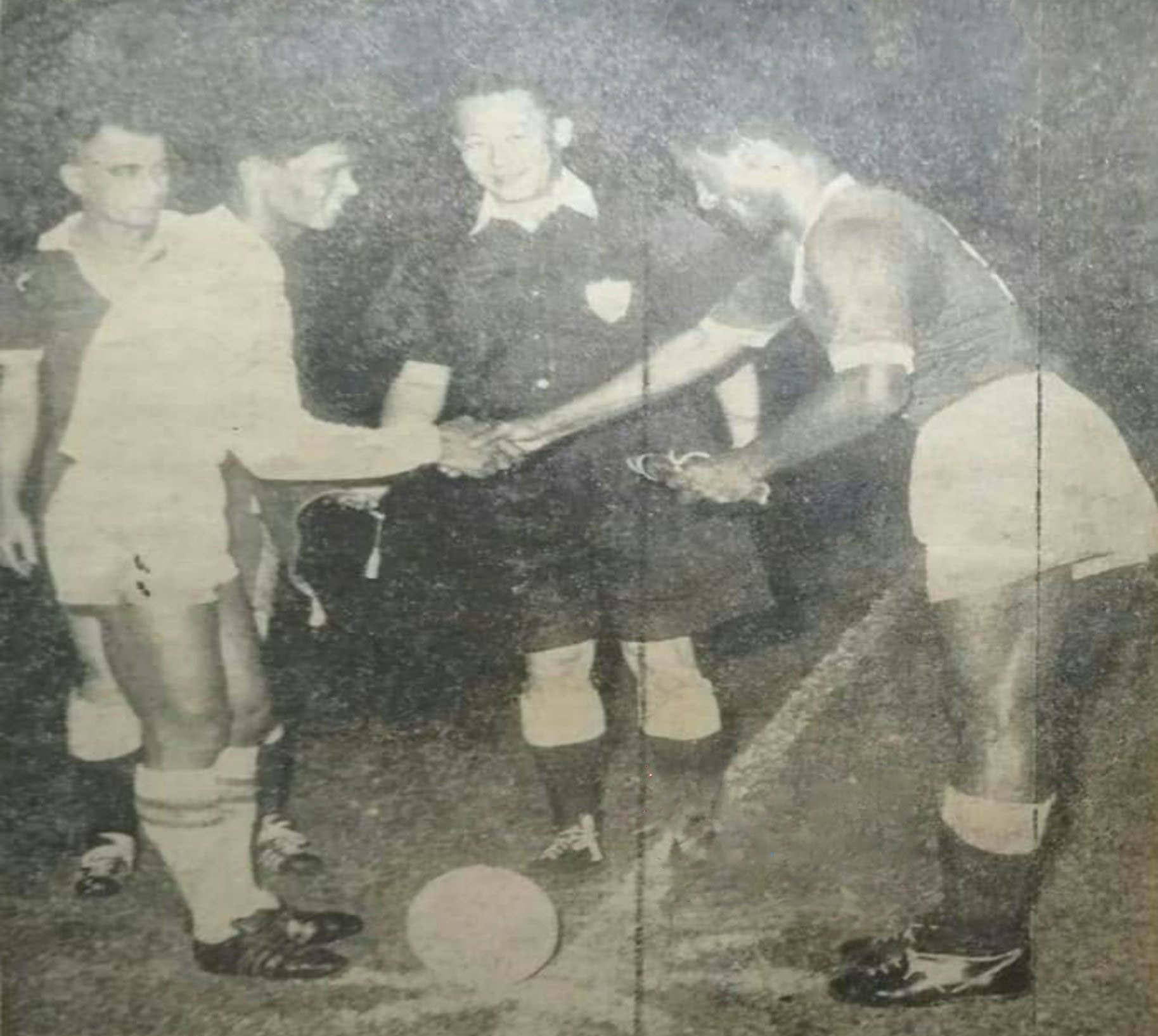
Bahadur with Pakistan national team captain Muhammad Umer (right) during the 1962 Merdeka Tournament

Suk Bahadur played over 152 matches for Myanmar from 1953 to 1969 and scored more than 80 goals.

== Personal life ==
Bahadur was married to Khin Than Myint.

== Death and funeral ==
He died on 19 August 2001 at the age of 68.

== Career statistics ==
=== International goals ===
Scores and results list Burma's goal tally first, score column indicates score after each Bahadur goal.

List of international goals scored by Suk Bahadur
No.	Date	Venue	Opponent	Score	Result	Competition	Ref.
1	17 December 1955	Dacca Stadium, Dhaka, East Pakistan	Pakistan		2–4	1955 Asian Quadrangular Football Tournament	
2	20 December 1955	Dacca Stadium, Dhaka, East Pakistan	India		2–5	1955 Asian Quadrangular Football Tournament	
3	23 December 1955	Dacca Stadium, Dhaka, East Pakistan	Ceylon		1–3	1955 Asian Quadrangular Football Tournament	
4	23 December 1955	Dacca Stadium, Dhaka, East Pakistan	Ceylon		1–3	1955 Asian Quadrangular Football Tournament	
5	7 September 1957	Kuala Lumpur, Malaya	Singapore		2–3	1957 Merdeka Tournament	
6	7 September 1957	Kuala Lumpur, Malaya	Singapore		2–3	1957 Merdeka Tournament	
7	18 January 1961	Dhaka, East Pakistan	Pakistan		3–1	Friendly	
8	18 January 1961	Dhaka, East Pakistan	Pakistan		3–1	Friendly	
9	28 August 1964	Kuala Lumpur, Malaya	Malaysia		3–0	1964 Merdeka Tournament	
10	12 November 1967	Bogyoke Aung San Stadium, Rangoon, Burma	India		2–0	1968 AFC Asian Cup qualification	
11	19 November 1967	Bogyoke Aung San Stadium, Rangoon, Burma	Pakistan		2–0	1968 AFC Asian Cup qualification	
12	18 May 1968	Amjadieh Stadium, Tehran, Iran	Hong Kong		2–0	1968 AFC Asian Cup	
13	10 August 1968	Kuala Lumpur, Malaya	South Vietnam		3–0	1968 Merdeka Tournament	
14	17 August 1968	Kuala Lumpur, Malaya	Malaysia		1–1	1968 Merdeka Tournament	
15	18 August 1968	Kuala Lumpur, Malaya	India		1–3	1968 Merdeka Tournament	
16	20 November 1968	Bangkok, Thailand	Laos		3–0	1968 King's Cup	

== Honours ==
The following is a list of championships achieved during his captaincy.

Burma

- Asian Games Gold medal: 1966, 1970; Bronze medal: 1954
- AFC Asian Cup runner-up: 1968
- SEA Games: 1965, 1967, 1969
- Merdeka Cup: 1964, 1967
- King's Cup runner-up: 1968

Individual

- Asian All Stars: 1965, 1966, 1967, 1968
