= Magnús Torfason =

Icelandic footballer (born 1945)

Personal information
- Full name: Magnús Trausti Torfason
- Date of birth: 25 February 1945 (age 81)
- Place of birth: Eyrarbakki, Iceland
- Positions: Defender; forward

Senior career*
Years	Team	Apps	(Gls)
1964–1973	ÍBK		

International career
- Iceland U23
1966–1967	Iceland	4	(2)
- * Club domestic league appearances and goals

Magnús Trausti Torfason (born 25 February 1945) is an Icelandic former footballer who played as a defender or forward.

== Early life and club career ==
Torfason was born in Eyrarbakki, but grew up in Keflavík. He played for ÍBK, where he won four Icelandic league titles.

== International career ==
Torfason was the captain of the Iceland under-23 national team. He made four appearances for the senior team, scoring twice during 1968 Summer Olympics qualification against Spain.
