= Football at the 1968 Summer Olympics – Men's Asian Qualifiers – Group 3 =

The 1968 Summer Olympics football qualification – Asia Group 3, held in Israel, was one of the three Asian groups in the Summer Olympics football qualification tournament to decide which teams would qualify for the 1968 Summer Olympics football finals tournament in Mexico. Group 3 consisted of two teams: Ceylon and Israel, whilst four other teams withdrew; Burma, India, Iran and North Korea. The teams played against each other in a round-robin format. The group winners, Israel, qualified directly for the Summer Olympics football finals.

== Standings ==
Pos	Team	Pld	W	D	L	GF	GA	GD	Pts	Qualification
1	Israel (H)	2	2	0	0	11	0	+11	4	Qualification for 1968 Summer Olympics
2	Ceylon	2	0	0	2	0	11	−11	0	
3	Burma	0	0	0	0	0	0	0	0	Withdrew
4	India	0	0	0	0	0	0	0	0	Withdrew
5	Iran	0	0	0	0	0	0	0	0	Withdrew
6	North Korea	0	0	0	0	0	0	0	0	Withdrew

Source: RSSSF
(H) Hosts

== Matches ==
17 March 1968

Israel	7–0	Ceylon
Borba 1', 63'; Spiegler 11', 59', 85'; Perera 30' (o.g.); Spiegel 47'

Bloomfield Stadium, Tel Aviv
Attendance: 14,000
Referee: Wanchai Suwaree (Thailand)
22 March 1968

Israel	4–0	Ceylon
Spiegel 55'; Talbi 62'; Rosenthal 66'; Borba 77'	Report

Bloomfield Stadium, Tel Aviv
Attendance: 10,000
Referee: Joseph Heymann (Switzerland)

== Goalscorers ==
There were 11 goals scored in 2 matches, for an average of 5.5 goals per match.

3 goals

- (Israel national football team) Mordechai Spiegler
- (Israel national football team) George Borba

2 goals

- (Israel national football team) Giora Spiegel

1 goal

- (Israel national football team) Rahamim Talbi
- (Israel national football team) Shmuel Rosenthal

1 own goal

- (Sri Lanka national football team) Perera
