= Football at the 1968 Summer Olympics – Men's African Qualifiers – Group 1 =

The 1968 Summer Olympics football qualification – Africa Group 1 was one of the three African groups in the Summer Olympics football qualification tournament to decide which teams would qualify for the 1968 Summer Olympics football finals tournament in Mexico. Group 1 consisted of six teams: Algeria, Gabon, Guinea, Libya, Niger and United Arab Republic. The teams played home-and-away knockout matches. Guinea qualified for the Summer Olympics football finals after defeating Algeria 5–4 on aggregate in the final round.

== Summary ==
Team 1	Agg.	Team 2	1st leg	2nd leg
First round
Libya	4–2	Niger	2–0	2–2
Gabon	1–6	Guinea	0–0	1–6
Second round
Guinea	w/o	United Arab Republic	—	—
Libya	2–3	Algeria	1–2	1–1
Final round
Guinea	5–4	Algeria	3–2	2–2

== First round ==
21 April 1967

Libya	2–0	Niger

7 October Stadium, Tripoli
24 September 1967

Niger	2–2	Libya

Stade du 29 Juillet, Niamey

Libya won 4–2 on aggregate and advanced to the second round.

18 June 1967

Gabon	0–0	Guinea

Stade Omar Bongo, Libreville
9 July 1967

Guinea	6–1	Gabon
Souleymane (?)

Stade du 28 Septembre, Conakry

Guinea won 6–1 on aggregate and advanced to the second round.

== Second round ==
Guinea	w/o	United Arab Republic

United Arab Republic	w/o	Guinea

Guinea won on walkover and advanced to the final round.

12 November 1967

Libya	1–2	Algeria
Soueid 65'		Amirouche 38' (pen.), 85' (pen.)

Tripoli Stadium, Tripoli
Referee: Alessandro D'Agostini (Italy)
26 November 1967

Algeria	1–1	Libya
Amirouche 70'		Al-Maadani 40'

20 August 1955 Stadium, Algiers
Referee: Ayele Tessema (Ethiopia)

Algeria won 3–2 on aggregate and advanced to the final round.

== Final round ==
26 June 1968

Guinea	3–2	Algeria
Souleymane 7'; N'Dongo 10' (pen.); Maxime 55'		Lalmas 5'; Achour 89'

Stade d'Honneur, Casablanca
Attendance: 10,000
Referee: Belagif (Morocco)
30 June 1968

Algeria	2–2	Guinea
Lalmas 27', 42'		Kandia 38' Sim 58'

Stade d'Honneur, Casablanca
Attendance: 10,000
Referee: Salih Mohamed Boukili (Morocco)

Guinea won 5–4 on aggregate and qualified for the Summer Olympics.

== Goalscorers ==
There were 27 goals scored in 8 matches, for an average of 3.38 goals per match.

3 goals

- (Algeria national football team) Boualem Amirouche
- (Algeria national football team) Hacène Lalmas

2 goals

- (Guinea national football team) Chérif Souleymane

1 goal

- (Libya national football team) Ahmed Ben Soueid
- (Libya national football team) Naji Al-Maadani
- (Guinea national football team) N'Dongo Camara
- (Guinea national football team) Maxime Camara
- (Algeria national football team) Hacène Achour
- (Guinea national football team) Ibrahima Kandia Diallo
- (Guinea national football team) Souma Sim
