= Football at the 1968 Summer Olympics – Men's African Qualifiers – Group 2 =

The 1968 Summer Olympics football qualification – Africa Group 2 was one of the three African groups in the Summer Olympics football qualification tournament to decide which teams would qualify for the 1968 Summer Olympics football finals tournament in Mexico. Group 2 consisted of six teams: Ethiopia, Madagascar, Nigeria, Sudan, Tanzania and Uganda. The teams played home-and-away knockout matches. Nigeria qualified for the Summer Olympics football finals after defeating Ethiopia 3–2 on aggregate in the final round.

== Summary ==
Team 1	Agg.	Team 2	1st leg	2nd leg
First round
Nigeria	w/o	Uganda	—	—
Madagascar	6–2	Tanzania	4–2	2–0
Second round
Nigeria	2–2 (l)	Sudan	1–0	1–2
Madagascar	4–8	Ethiopia	1–0	3–8
Final round
Nigeria	3–2	Ethiopia	3–1	0–1

== First round ==
Nigeria	w/o	Uganda

Uganda	w/o	Nigeria

Nigeria won on walkover and advanced to the second round.

9 April 1967

Madagascar	4–2	Tanzania

Mahamasina Municipal Stadium, Antananarivo
16 April 1967

Tanzania	0–2	Madagascar

National Stadium, Dar es Salaam

Madagascar won 6–2 on aggregate and advanced to the second round.

== Second round ==
5 November 1967

Nigeria	1–0	Sudan

Surulere Stadium, Lagos
19 November 1967

Sudan	2–1	Nigeria

Municipal Stadium, Khartoum

Nigeria won via a drawing of lots 2–2 on aggregate and advanced to the final round.

10 December 1967

Madagascar	1–0	Ethiopia

Mahamasina Municipal Stadium, Antananarivo
17 December 1967

Ethiopia	8–3	Madagascar

Haillé Selassié Stadium, Addis Ababa

Ethiopia won 8–4 on aggregate and advanced to the final round.

== Final round ==
20 April 1968

Nigeria	3–1	Ethiopia

Surulere Stadium, Lagos
4 May 1968

Ethiopia	1–0	Nigeria

Haillé Selassié Stadium, Addis Ababa

Nigeria won 3–2 on aggregate and qualified for the Summer Olympics.
