= Football at the 1968 Summer Olympics – Men's African Qualifiers – Group 3 =

The 1968 Summer Olympics football qualification – Africa Group 3 was one of the three African groups in the Summer Olympics football qualification tournament to decide which teams would qualify for the 1968 Summer Olympics football finals tournament in Mexico. Group 3 consisted of five teams: Cameroon, Ghana, Mali, Morocco, Tunisia. The teams played home-and-away knockout matches. Morocco qualified for the Summer Olympics football finals after defeating Ghana 3–2 on aggregate in the final round, but withdrew after refusing to play against Israel in the final tournament in Group C.

== Summary ==
Team 1	Agg.	Team 2	1st leg	2nd leg
First round
Cameroon	w/o	Mali	—	—
Second round
Morocco	1–1 (l)	Tunisia	1–1	0–0
Cameroon	3–3	Ghana	1–0	2–3
Second round play-off
Cameroon	w/o	Ghana		
Final round
Morocco	3–2	Ghana	1–1	2–1

== First round ==
Cameroon	Cancelled	Mali

Mali	Cancelled	Cameroon

Cameroon won on walkover and advanced to the second round.

== Second round ==
5 November 1967

Morocco	1–1	Tunisia
Hamidouch 54'		Chaïbi 25'

Stade d'Honneur, Casablanca
Attendance: 20,000
26 November 1967

Tunisia	0–0	Morocco

Stade Chedly Zouiten, Tunis
Attendance: 20,000

Morocco won via a drawing of lots 1–1 on aggregate and advanced to the final round.

13 December 1967

Cameroon	1–0	Ghana

17 December 1967

Ghana	3–2	Cameroon

Accra Sports Stadium, Accra

Cameroon and Ghana tied 3–3 on aggregate and advanced to a play-off.

=== Play-off ===
Cameroon	Cancelled	Ghana

Ghana won on walkover and advanced to the final round.

== Final round ==
9 June 1968

Morocco	1–1	Ghana
Ghandi 7'		Attuquayefio 86'

Stade d'Honneur, Casablanca
Attendance: 25,000
30 June 1968

Ghana	1–2	Morocco
(?)		Faras (?)

Accra Sports Stadium, Accra
Attendance: 40 000

Morocco won 3–2 on aggregate and qualified for the Summer Olympics.
