= Football at the 1968 Summer Olympics – Men's European Qualifiers – Group 2 =

The 1968 Summer Olympics football qualification – Europe Group 2 was one of the four European groups in the Summer Olympics football qualification tournament to decide which teams would qualify for the 1968 Summer Olympics football finals tournament in Mexico. Group 2 consisted of five teams: Bulgaria, East Germany, Greece, Romania and Turkey. The teams played home-and-away knockout matches. Bulgaria qualified for the Summer Olympics football finals after defeating East Germany 6–4 on aggregate in the final round.

== Summary ==
| Team 1 | Agg. | Team 2 | 1st leg | 2nd leg |
|---|---|---|---|---|
First round
| Greece | 0–10 | East Germany | 0–5 | 0–5 |
Second round
| Turkey | 2–6 | Bulgaria | 2–3 | 0–3 |
| East Germany | 2–0 | Romania | 1–0 | 1–0 |
Final round
| Bulgaria | 6–4 | East Germany | 4–1 | 2–3 |

== First round ==
22 March 1967

| Greece | 0–5 | East Germany |
|---|---|---|
| | | Naumann 32'; Backhaus 42'; Stein 65', 70'; Lienemann 86' |

Panathenaic Stadium, Athens
Attendance: 6,000
Referee: Božidar Botić (Yugoslavia)
14 June 1967

| East Germany | 5–0 | Greece |
|---|---|---|
| Kreische 4', 60'; Naumann 31' (pen.); Seehaus 44'; Irmscher 56' |

Heinz-Steyer-Stadion, Dresden
Attendance: 15,000
Referee: Gusztáv Bircsák (Hungary)

East Germany won 10–0 on aggregate and advanced to the second round.

== Second round ==
12 October 1967

| Turkey | 2–3 | Bulgaria |
|---|---|---|
| Yalçıntaş 31'; Sözer 34' | Report | Davidov 48'; Dermendzhiev 61'; Yakimov 80' |

Mithatpaşa Stadyumu, Istanbul
Attendance: 18,000
Referee: Bruno De Marchi (Italy)
22 November 1967

| Bulgaria | 3–0 | Turkey |
|---|---|---|
| Mihaylov 53'; Nikodimov 72'; Georgiev 87' | Report |

Vasil Levski National Stadium, Sofia
Attendance: 10,000
Referee: Helmut Fritz (West Germany)

Bulgaria won 6–2 on aggregate and advanced to the final round.

18 November 1967
13:30 UTC+1

| East Germany | 1–0 | Romania |
|---|---|---|
| Pankau 8' (pen.) | Report |

Walter Ulbricht Stadion, East Berlin
Attendance: 35,000
Referee: Václav Davídek (Czechoslovakia)
6 December 1967
13:30 UTC+2

| Romania | 0–1 | East Germany |
|---|---|---|
| | Report | Irmscher 8' |

Stadionul 23 August, Bucharest
Attendance: 50,000
Referee: Leonard Eliński (Poland)

East Germany won 2–0 on aggregate and advanced to the final round.

== Final round ==
10 April 1968

| Bulgaria | 4–1 | East Germany |
|---|---|---|
| Dimitrov 9'; Zhekov 74', 75', 80' (pen.) | Report | Bransch 65' |

Stadion Beroe, Stara Zagora
Attendance: 30,000
Referee: Erich Linemayr (Austria)
24 April 1968

| East Germany | 3–2 | Bulgaria |
|---|---|---|
| Fräßdorf 4'; Sparwasser 20'; Vogel 37' | Report | Mihaylov 18', 76' |

Zentralstadion, Leipzig, East Germany
Attendance: 35,000
Referee: Othmar Huber (Switzerland)

Bulgaria won 6–4 on aggregate and qualified for the Summer Olympics.

== Goalscorers ==
There were 30 goals scored in 8 matches, for an average of 3.75 goals per match.

3 goals

- (Bulgaria national football team) Atanas Mihaylov
- (Bulgaria national football team) Petar Zhekov

2 goals

- (East Germany national football team) Harald Irmscher
- (East Germany national football team) Hans-Jürgen Kreische
- (East Germany national football team) Hans-Jürgen Naumann
- (East Germany national football team) Helmut Stein

1 goal

- (Bulgaria national football team) Ivan Davidov
- (Bulgaria national football team) Dinko Dermendzhiev
- (Bulgaria national football team) Yancho Dimitrov
- (Bulgaria national football team) Ivaylo Georgiev
- (Bulgaria national football team) Asparuh Nikodimov
- (Bulgaria national football team) Dimitar Yakimov
- (East Germany national football team) Gerd Backhaus
- (East Germany national football team) Bernd Bransch
- (East Germany national football team) Otto Fräßdorf
- (East Germany national football team) Manfred Lienemann
- (East Germany national football team) Herbert Pankau
- (East Germany national football team) Klaus-Dieter Seehaus
- (East Germany national football team) Jürgen Sparwasser
- (East Germany national football team) Eberhard Vogel
- (Turkey Olympic football team) Burhan Sözer
- (Turkey Olympic football team) Selçuk Yalçıntaş
