= Federico Veloso =

Filipino footballer

Personal information
- Full name: Federico P. Veloso

Senior career*
Years	Team	Apps	(Gls)
1960–1962	YCO Athletic Club		
?	La Salle Athletic Club		
?	Condors		
?	Toyota-La Salle		
?	Club Filipino		
?	Blue Guards		
?	Manila Jockey Club		

International career
c. 1959–1972	Philippines (inc. youth)		

Managerial career
- Zig-Zag Jaro
- * Club domestic league appearances and goals

Federico P. Veloso was a Filipino international footballer.

Velso studied at the De La Salle for both his grade school and high school studies. He graduated from high school in 1959.

The De La Salle alumni was also a member of the Philippine national team that participated at the 1959 and 1960 AFC Youth Championships, 1962 Asian Games, 1962 Merdeka Tournament, 1962 Asian Football Cup in Taiwan and the 1966 Olympic qualifiers.

He played for the YCO Athletic Club from 1960 to 1962. Veloso also played for other football clubs in Manila such as the La Salle Athletic Club, the Condors, Toyota-La Salle, Club Filipino, the Blue Guards and the Manila Jockey Club.

Veloso served as captain of the Philippine team at the 1971 and 1972 Merdeka Tournament and 1972 Pesta Sukan Cup. Veloso also coached the first under-13 national team for De La Salle College and won the championship and in 2007 was inducted at the De La Salle Athletic Association Sports Hall of Fame.
