= States and Divisions Football Championship =

The States and Divisions Football Championship is a reoccurring football tournament in Myanmar.

The Myanmar Football Federation was formed in 1947. From 1947 to 1950, leagues were only regional. The States and Divisions Football Tournament was first held in 1952.

== States and Regions ==
Flags of the Burmese states and regions	Capital
Ayeyarwady Region	Pathein
Bago Region	Bago
Chin State	Hakha
Kachin State	Myitkyina
Kayah State	Loikaw
Kayin State	Pa-an
Magway Region	Magwe
Mandalay Region	Mandalay
Mon State	Mawlamyaing
Rakhine State	Sittwe
Shan State	Taunggyi
Sagaing Region	Sagaing
Tanintharyi Region	Dawei
Yangon Region	Yangon

== Results ==
Sr.	Year	Host	Final			Third place match			Number of teams
Sr.	Year	Host	Winner	Score	Runner-up	Third place	Score	Fourth place	Number of teams
17th	1968/69; Details	Yangon	Shan State	1–1	Yangon	()		()	14
th	1983/84; Details	Yangon	Mandalay Region	2–1	Magway Region	Yangon	Shared	Bago Region	8
th	1984/85; Details	Yangon	Magway Region	1 – 0 Thein Tun 50'Pen	Yangon	Mandalay Region	Shared	Sagaing Region	8
36th	1987/88; Details	Yangon	Mandalay Region	3–1	Yangon		Shared		8
43rd	1997/98; Details	Yangon	Mandalay Region	1 – 1 P.K(4:3)	Yangon	Kachin State	2–1	Sagaing Region	8
47th	2001/02; Details	Yangon	Mandalay Region	0 – 0 P.K(9:8)	Sagaing Region	(-)		(-)	14
48th	2002/03; Details	Yangon	Shan State(South)	2–0	Kayin State	Ayeyarwady Region	2–0	Bago Region	14
51st	2005/06; Details	Yangon	Ayeyarwady Region	1 – 1 P.K(5:3)	Shan State(South)	Mandalay Region	6–2	Bago Region	14
