= Football at the 1968 Summer Olympics – Men's European Qualifiers – Group 4 =

The 1968 Summer Olympics football qualification – Europe Group 4 was one of the four European groups in the Summer Olympics football qualification tournament to decide which teams would qualify for the 1968 Summer Olympics football finals tournament in Mexico. Group 4 consisted of five teams: Great Britain, Iceland, Italy, Spain and West Germany. The teams played home-and-away knockout matches. Spain qualified for the Summer Olympics football finals after defeating Great Britain 1–0 on aggregate in the final round.

== Summary ==
Team 1	Agg.	Team 2	1st leg	2nd leg
First round
Iceland	4–6	Spain	1–1	3–5
Second round
West Germany	1–2	Great Britain	0–2	1–0
Spain	w/o	Italy	—	—
Final round
Spain	1–0	Great Britain	1–0	0–0

== First round ==
31 May 1967
20:30 UTC

Iceland	1–1	Spain
Torfason 88'	Report	Costas 86'

Laugardalsvöllur, Reykjavík
Attendance: 5,448
Referee: Gunnar Michaelsen (Denmark)
22 June 1967
18:15 UTC+1

Spain	5–3	Iceland
Peláez 32', 44'; Hernández 68', 84', 88'	Report	Torfason 35'; Hafsteinsson 49'; Árnason 64'

Estadio Antonio Borrachero, Madrid
Attendance: 5,000
Referee: Mohamed Boukili (Morocco)

Spain won 6–4 on aggregate and advanced to the second round.

== Second round ==
25 October 1967

West Germany	0–2	Great Britain
		Pritchard 77'; Maas 90' (o.g.)

Rosenaustadion, Augsburg
Attendance: 8,000
Referee: Dimiter Rumentchev (Bulgaria)
8 November 1967

Great Britain	0–1	West Germany
		Keifler (?)

Claremont Road Ground, London
Attendance: 5,500
Referee: Jozeph Dorpmans (Netherlands)

Great Britain won 2–1 on aggregate and advanced to the final round.

Spain	w/o	Italy

Italy	w/o	Spain

Spain won on walkover and advanced to the final round.

== Final round ==
27 March 1968

Spain	1–0	Great Britain
Ortega 4'

Estadi de la Nova Creu Alta, Sabadell
Attendance: 20,000
Referee: Johan Einar Boström (Sweden)
10 April 1968

Great Britain	0–0	Spain

White City Stadium, London
Attendance: 4,000
Referee: Roger Machin (France)

Spain won 1–0 on aggregate and qualified for the Summer Olympics.

There were 14 goals scored in 6 matches, for an average of 2.33 goals per match.

3 goals

- (Spain national football team) Luis Alberto Aparicio Hernández

2 goals

- (Iceland national football team) Magnús Torfason
- (Spain national football team) Maxi Peláez

1 goal

- (Spain national football team) Quique Costas
- (Iceland national football team) Eyleifur Hafsteinsson
- (Iceland national football team) Kári Árnason
- (Great Britain Olympic football team) Larry Pritchard
- (Germany national football team) Günther Keifler
- (Spain national football team) Gerardo Ortega

1 own goal

- (Germany national football team) Günter Maas
