= Football at the 1968 Summer Olympics – Men's European Qualifiers – Group 1 =

The 1968 Summer Olympics football qualification – Europe Group 1 was one of the four European groups in the Summer Olympics football qualification tournament to decide which teams would qualify for the 1968 Summer Olympics football finals tournament in Mexico. Group 1 consisted of five teams: Albania, Czechoslovakia, Poland, Soviet Union and Yugoslavia. The teams played home-and-away knockout matches. Czechoslovakia qualified for the Summer Olympics football finals after defeating Soviet Union 5–3 on aggregate in the final round.

== Summary ==
Team 1	Agg.	Team 2	1st leg	2nd leg
First round
Soviet Union	w/o	Albania	—	—
Second round
Poland	1–3	Soviet Union	0–1	1–2
Czechoslovakia	w/o	Yugoslavia	—	—
Final round
Soviet Union	3–5	Czechoslovakia	3–2	0–3

== First round ==
Soviet Union	w/o	Albania

Albania	w/o	Soviet Union

Soviet Union won on walkover and advanced to the second round.

== Second round ==
28 July 1967
17:00 UTC+1

Poland	0–1	Soviet Union
	Report	Chislenko 59'

Olympic Stadium, Wrocław
Attendance: 50,000
Referee: Bertil Lööw (Sweden)
4 August 1967
19:00 UTC+3

Soviet Union	2–1	Poland
Chislenko 3'; Banishevskiy 59'	Report	Lubański 64' (pen.)

Lenin Central Stadium, Moscow
Attendance: 90,000
Referee: Jack Taylor (England)

Soviet Union won 3–1 on aggregate and advanced to the final round.

Czechoslovakia	w/o	Yugoslavia

Yugoslavia	w/o	Czechoslovakia

Czechoslovakia won on walkover and advanced to the final round.

== Final round ==
21 May 1968
19:30 UTC+3

Soviet Union	3–2	Czechoslovakia
Khurtsilava 45'; Chislenko 85'; Anichkin 87'	Report	Čapkovič 51'; Štrunc 73'

Lenin Central Stadium, Moscow
Attendance: 92,000
Referee: Gottfried Dienst (Switzerland)
1 June 1968
17:00 UTC+1

Czechoslovakia	3–0	Soviet Union
Pollák 20'; Pivarník 25'; Čapkovič 72'	Report

Stadion Balazy, Ostrava
Attendance: 20,000
Referee: John Gow (Wales)

Czechoslovakia won 5–3 on aggregate and qualified for the Summer Olympics.

== Goalscorers ==
There were 12 goals scored in 4 matches, for an average of 3 goals per match.

3 goals

- (Soviet Union national football team) Igor Chislenko

2 goals

- (Czechoslovakia Olympic football team) Ján Čapkovič

1 goal

- (Czechoslovakia Olympic football team) Ján Pivarník
- (Czechoslovakia Olympic football team) Jaroslav Pollák
- (Czechoslovakia Olympic football team) Stanislav Štrunc
- (Poland national football team) Włodzimierz Lubański
- (Soviet Union national football team) Anatoliy Banishevskiy
- (Soviet Union national football team) Murtaz Khurtsilava
- (Soviet Union national football team) Viktor Anichkin
