= South Vietnam Independence Cup =

South Vietnam Independence Cup Quốc Khánh Cup
- Organiser(s): VFA
- Founded: 1961
- Abolished: 1974
- Last champions: South Vietnam (6th title)
- Most championships: South Vietnam (6 titles)

The South Vietnam Independence Cup (Vietnamese: Quốc Khánh Cup) was an invitational football tournament in South Vietnam that took place on several occasions between 1961 and 1974.

Year	Winner	Runner-up
1961	South Vietnam	Malaya
1962	South Vietnam	Indonesia
1965	South Vietnam	Malaysia
1966	South Vietnam	Malaysia
1967	Australia	South Korea
1970	South Vietnam	Thailand
1971	Malaysia	South Vietnam
1972	Khmer Republic	South Vietnam
1973	(Indonesia) Persija Jakarta	Malaysia
1974	South Vietnam	(Indonesia) Persipura Jayapura
