= Yancho Dimitrov (footballer) =

Bulgarian footballer

Personal information
- Date of birth: 11 March 1943
- Place of birth: Dimitrovgrad, Bulgaria
- Date of death: 4 December 1992 (aged 49)
- Place of death: Bulgaria
- Position: Forward

Senior career*
Years	Team	Apps	(Gls)
1960–1961	Dimitrovgrad	–	(–)
1961–1968	Beroe	172	(44)
1968–1972	Slavia Sofia	76	(8)
Total		248	(52)

International career
1965–1968	Bulgaria	10	(3)
- * Club domestic league appearances and goals

Yancho Dimitrov (11 March 1943 – 4 December 1992) was a Bulgarian footballer who played as a forward. He competed in the men's tournament at the 1968 Summer Olympics.
