= Football at the 1968 Summer Olympics – Men's African Qualifiers =

Tournament details
- Dates: 27 September 1967 – 22 March 1968
- Teams: 17 (from 1 confederation)

Tournament statistics
- Matches played: 22
- Goals scored: 69 (3.14 per match)

The African section of the 1968 Summer Olympics football qualification acted as qualifiers for the 1968 Summer Olympics football tournament held in Mexico, for football teams from Africa. Three slots in the final tournament were available for African teams.

== Format ==
Three groups of five to six teams compete in a home-and-away knockout stage. The winners of each group qualifies for the Summer Olympics football finals.

== Groups ==
=== Group 1 ===
Team 1	Agg.	Team 2	1st leg	2nd leg
First round
Libya	4–2	Niger	2–0	2–2
Gabon	1–6	Guinea	0–0	1–6
Second round
Guinea	w/o	United Arab Republic	—	—
Libya	2–3	Algeria	1–2	1–1
Final round
Guinea	5–4	Algeria	3–2	2–2

=== Group 2 ===
Team 1	Agg.	Team 2	1st leg	2nd leg
First round
Nigeria	w/o	Uganda	—	—
Madagascar	6–2	Tanzania	4–2	2–0
Second round
Nigeria	2–2 (l)	Sudan	1–0	1–2
Madagascar	4–8	Ethiopia	1–0	3–8
Final round
Nigeria	3–2	Ethiopia	3–1	0–1

=== Group 3 ===
Team 1	Agg.	Team 2	1st leg	2nd leg
First round
Cameroon	w/o	Mali	—	—
Second round
Morocco	1–1 (l)	Tunisia	1–1	0–0
Cameroon	3–3	Ghana	1–0	2–3
Second round play-off
Cameroon	w/o	Ghana		
Final round
Morocco	3–2	Ghana	1–1	2–1

== Qualified teams ==
The following three teams from Africa qualified for the final tournament.

Team	Qualified as	Qualified on	Previous appearances in Summer Olympics^{1} ^{2}
Nigeria	Group 2 winners	4 May 1968	0 (debut)
Guinea	Group 1 winners	30 June 1968	0 (debut)
~~Morocco~~^{3}	Group 3 winners	30 June 1968	1 (1964)

^{1} Bold indicates champions for that year. Italic indicates hosts for that year.
^{2} Includes all participations by a competing nation at the Summer Olympics (clubs representing nations, olympic teams, full national teams, etc.).
^{3} Morocco withdrew due to refusing to play against Israel in the final tournament, and were replaced by Ghana.
