= Kim Ki-bok =

South Korean footballer and manager (born 1944)

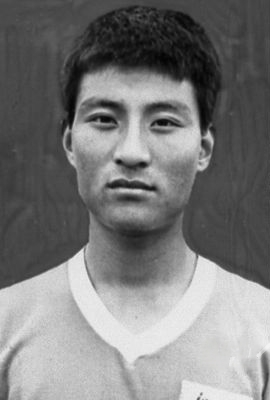

Personal information
- Date of birth: May 20, 1944 (age 82)
- Place of birth: Kōkai-dō, Korea, Empire of Japan
- Position: Forward

Senior career*
| Years | Team | Apps | (Gls) |
- Yangzee FC
- Seoul Trust Bank FC

International career
| 1965–1971 | South Korea | | |

Managerial career
- 1982–1991: Chung-Ang University
- 1993: South Korea B
- 1994: Chonbuk Buffalo
- 1997–2000: Daejeon Citizen FC
- 2002–2005: Police FC
Medal record
Representing South Korea
Men's football
Asian Games
| Gold medal – first place | 1970 Bangkok | Team |
- * Club domestic league appearances and goals

- Kim Ki-bok
- Hangul: 김기복
- Hanja: 金基福
- RR: Gim Gibok
- MR: Kim Kibok

Kim Ki-bok (born 1944) is a former South Korean football player and manager. He was first manager of Jeonbuk Buffalo and Daejeon Citizen FC.
