= Helmut Voggenberger =

Austrian Nordic combined skier

Personal information
- Nationality: Austrian
- Born: 21 April 1943 (age 82) Saalfelden, Nazi Germany

Sport
- Sport: Nordic combined

Helmut Voggenberger (born 21 April 1943) is an Austrian skier. He competed in the Nordic combined event at the 1968 Winter Olympics.
