= 1974 FIFA World Cup qualification – AFC and OFC Zone A =

Football tournament qualification stage

The AFC and OFC Zone A of 1974 FIFA World Cup qualification was contested between 7 AFC and OFC members.

== Classification matches ==
16 May 1973	South Vietnam	1 – 0	Thailand	Dongdaemun Stadium, Seoul
18:00 KST (UTC+09)	Supakit Meelarpkit 81' (o.g.)			Attendance: 25,000; Referee: Coffman (New Zealand)

16 May 1973	Israel	2 – 1	Japan	Dongdaemun Stadium, Seoul
19:45 KST (UTC+09)	Mordechai Spiegler 5'; Moshe Onana 61'		Shusaku Hirasawa 27'	Attendance: 25,000; Referee: Boskovic (Australia)

17 May 1973	Hong Kong	1 – 0	Malaysia	Dongdaemun Stadium, Seoul
19:00 KST (UTC+09)	Lo Hung Hoi 53'			Attendance: 5,000; Referee: Azam (India)

Based on the results, South Vietnam, Japan and Hong Kong were placed in Group 1, while Thailand, Israel and Malaysia were placed in Group 2 with Korea Republic.

=== Group 1 ===
Rank	Team	Pts	Pld	W	D	L	GF	GA	GD
1	Hong Kong	4	2	2	0	0	2	0	+2
2	Japan	2	2	1	0	1	4	1	+3
3	South Vietnam	0	2	0	0	2	0	5	−5

20 May 1973	Japan	4 – 0	South Vietnam	Dongdaemun Stadium, Seoul
15:00 KST (UTC+09)	Kunishige Kamamoto 5', 86'; Takaji Mori 19'; Nguyen Vinh Quang 55' (o.g.)	Report		Attendance: 10,000; Referee: Coffman (New Zealand)

22 May 1973	Hong Kong	1 – 0	Japan	Dongdaemun Stadium, Seoul
19:00 KST (UTC+09)	Kwok Ka Ming 82'			Attendance: 10,000; Referee: Boskovic (Australia)

24 May 1973	Hong Kong	1 – 0	South Vietnam	Dongdaemun Stadium, Seoul
19:00 KST (UTC+09)	Yuen Kuen Chu 68'			Attendance: 5,000; Referee: Aing Kim Ean (Khmer Republic)

Hong Kong and Japan advanced to the Zone A Semifinals.

=== Group 2 ===
Rank	Team	Pts	Pld	W	D	L	GF	GA	GD
1	Israel	5	3	2	1	0	9	0	+9
2	South Korea	4	3	1	2	0	4	0	+4
3	Malaysia	3	3	1	1	1	2	3	−1
4	Thailand	0	3	0	0	3	0	12	−12

19 May 1973	South Korea	4 – 0	Thailand	Dongdaemun Stadium, Seoul
15:40 KST (UTC+09)	Kim Jae-Han 52'; Cha Bum Kun 63'; Chung Kyu-Poong 79', 84'			Attendance: 30,000; Referee: Ruslan Hatta (Indonesia)

19 May 1973	Israel	3 – 0	Malaysia	Dongdaemun Stadium, Seoul
17:25 KST (UTC+09)	Farkas 50'; Itzhak Shum 62'; Moshe Onana 82'			Attendance: 30,000; Referee: Aing Kim Ean (Khmer Republic)

21 May 1973	Israel	6 – 0	Thailand	Dongdaemun Stadium, Seoul
18:00 KST (UTC+09)	George Borba 12'; Mordechai Spiegler 62'; Itzhak Shum 69'; Zvi Rozen 73', 84'; Moshe Onana 78'			Attendance: 35,000; Referee: Dhillon (Singapore)

21 May 1973	South Korea	0 – 0	Malaysia	Dongdaemun Stadium, Seoul
19:45 KST (UTC+09)				Attendance: 35,000; Referee: U Tin Thut (Burma)

23 May 1973	Malaysia	2 – 0	Thailand	Dongdaemun Stadium, Seoul
18:00 KST (UTC+09)	Rahim Abdullah; Harun Jusoh			Attendance: 40,000; Referee: Azam (India)

23 May 1973	South Korea	0 – 0	Israel	Dongdaemun Stadium, Seoul
19:45 KST (UTC+09)				Attendance: 40,000; Referee: U Tin Thut (Burma)

Israel and Korea Republic advanced to the Zone A Semifinals.

== Semifinals ==
26 May 1973	Hong Kong	1 – 3	South Korea	Dongdaemun Stadium, Seoul
15:00 KST (UTC+09)	Yuen Kuen Chu 5'		Kim Jae-Han 45'; Park Yi-Chun 52'; Chung Kyu-Poong 72'	Attendance: 35,000; Referee: Ruslan Hatta (Indonesia)

26 May 1973	Israel	1 – 0 (a.e.t.)	Japan	Dongdaemun Stadium, Seoul
16:45 KST (UTC+09)	Moshe Onana 110'			Attendance: 35,000; Referee: Dhillon (Singapore)

Korea Republic and Israel advanced to the Zone A Final.

== Final ==
28 May 1973	South Korea	1 – 0 (a.e.t.)	Israel	Dongdaemun Stadium, Seoul
19:00 KST (UTC+09)	Cha Bum-Kun 109'			Attendance: 40,000; Referee: U Tin Thut (Burma)

Korea Republic advanced to the Final Round.
