= Football at the 1968 Summer Olympics – Men's Asian Qualifiers – Group 2 =

The 1968 Summer Olympics football qualification – Asia Group 2, held by Thailand, was one of the three Asian groups in the Summer Olympics football qualification tournament to decide which teams would qualify for the 1968 Summer Olympics football finals tournament in Mexico. Group 2 consisted of three teams: Indonesia, Iraq, Thailand, whilst three other teams withdrew; Hong Kong, Malaysia and Pakistan. The teams played against each other in a round-robin format. The group winners, Thailand, qualified directly for the Summer Olympics football finals.

== Standings ==
Pos	Team	Pld	W	D	L	GF	GA	GD	Pts	Qualification
1	Thailand (H)	4	3	0	1	5	6	−1	6	Qualification for 1968 Summer Olympics
2	Iraq	4	1	1	2	7	5	+2	3	
3	Indonesia	4	1	1	2	4	5	−1	3	
4	Hong Kong	0	0	0	0	0	0	0	0	Withdrew
5	Malaysia	0	0	0	0	0	0	0	0	Withdrew
6	Pakistan	0	0	0	0	0	0	0	0	Withdrew

Source: RSSSF
(H) Hosts

== Matches ==
16 January 1968

Thailand	0–4	Iraq
		Dhiab 3', 33'; Atta 26'; Nouri 59'

Supachalasai Stadium, Bangkok
Attendance: 7,395
Referee: Norman Boswell (Malaysia)
18 January 1968

Indonesia	2–1	Iraq
Hong 32'; Sihasale 52'		Dhiab 54'

Supachalasai Stadium, Bangkok
Attendance: 5,067
Referee: Govindasamy Suppiah (Singapore)
20 January 1968

Thailand	2–1	Iraq
Srisawat 23'; Sornbutnark 62'		Dhiab 50'

Supachalasai Stadium, Bangkok
Attendance: 11,297
Referee: Đậu Văn Dư (South Vietnam)

Thailand	2–1	Indonesia

Supachalasai Stadium, Bangkok
22 January 1968

Iraq	1–1	Indonesia
Dhiab 60'		Soentoro 22'

Supachalasai Stadium, Bangkok
Attendance: 5,679
Referee: Norman Boswell (Malaysia)

Thailand	1–0	Indonesia
Sornbutnark 10'

Supachalasai Stadium, Bangkok
Attendance: 12,000

== Goalscorers ==
There were 16 goals scored in 6 matches, for an average of 2.67 goals per match.

5 goals

- (Iraq national football team) Nouri Dhiab

2 goals

- (Thailand national football team) Udomsilp Sornbutnark

1 goal

- (Iraq national football team) Hisham Atta
- (Iraq national football team) Mudhafar Nouri
- (Indonesia national football team) Tjan Peng Hong
- (Indonesia national football team) Jacob Sihasale
- (Thailand national football team) Niwat Srisawat
- (Indonesia national football team) Soetjipto Soentoro
