= Morón de Almazán =

- Municipality
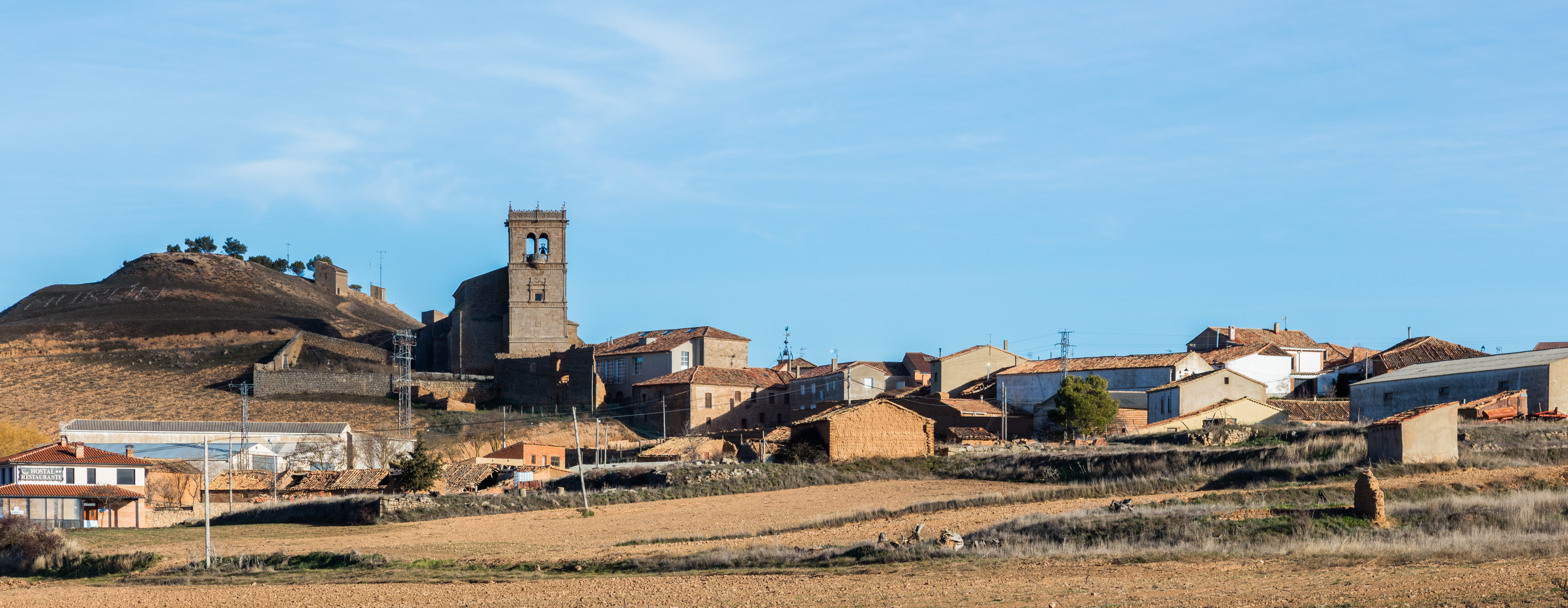
- View of Morón de Almazán, Soria, Spain

- Coat of arms

- Location in Spain. Morón de Almazán (Spain)
- Coordinates: 41°24′53″N 2°24′46″W
- Country: Spain
- Autonomous community: Castile and León
- Province: Soria
- Municipality: Morón de Almazán

Area
  - Total: 62 km^{2} (24 sq mi)

Population (2025-01-01)
  - Total: 196
  - Density: 3.2/km^{2} (8.2/sq mi)
- Time zone: UTC+1 (CET)
  - Summer (DST): UTC+2 (CEST)
- Website: Official website

Morón de Almazán is a municipality located in the province of Soria, Castile and León, Spain. According to the 2004 census (INE), the municipality has a population of 247 inhabitants.
