= 1983/84 States and Divisions Football Championship =

== 1983/84 States and Divisions Football Championship ==
=== Group A ===
Team	Pld	W	D	L	GF	GA	GD	Pts
Mandalay Region	3	3	0	0	9	1	+8	6
Sagaing Region	3	1	1	1	5	5	0	3
Yangon Region	3	1	1	1	2	2	0	3
Tanintharyi Region	3	0	0	3	2	10	−8	0

Second Place Playoff

December 1983
15:30

Yangon Region	1–0	Sagaing Region

=== Group B ===
Team	Pld	W	D	L	GF	GA	GD	Pts
Magway Region	3	2	1	0	6	3	+3	5
Bago Region	3	2	0	1	6	2	+4	4
Mon State	3	0	2	1	3	4	−1	2
Kachin State	3	0	1	2	3	9	−6	1

=== Semi – Final ===
January 1984
15:30

Magway Region	1–0	Yangon Region

January 1984
15:30

Mandalay Region	2–1	Bago Region

==== Final ====
January 1984
15:30

Mandalay Region	2–1	Magway Region

    - *Champion
      Mandalay Region
