= Hans-Jürgen Naumann =

German footballer

Personal information
- Date of birth: 1 April 1944 (age 82)
- Position: Midfielder

Youth career
- –1962: Rotation Leipzig

Senior career*
Years	Team	Apps	(Gls)
1962–1973	Lok Leipzig		
1972–1975	Lok Leipzig II		
1975–1976	Aktivist Borna		
1976–1980	Aktivist Espenhain		

International career
1968	East Germany	1	(0)

Managerial career
- 1980–1982: Aktivist Espenhain
- * Club domestic league appearances and goals

Hans-Jürgen Naumann (born 1 April 1944) is a retired German football midfielder.
