= Jung Byung-tak =

South Korean footballer and manager

Jung Byung-tak 정병탁
Personal information
- Full name: Jung Byung-tak
- Date of birth: 14 March 1942
- Place of birth: Korea, Empire of Japan
- Date of death: February 11, 2016 (aged 73)
- Place of death: South Korea
- Height: 1.73 m (5 ft 8 in)
- Position: Forward

Youth career
- Yonsei University

Senior career*
Years	Team	Apps	(Gls)
- Yangzee FC
- Trust Bank FC

International career
1963–1970	South Korea		

Managerial career
- 1984–1992: Yonsei University
- 1995: South Korea
- 1994–1996: Chunnam Dragons
- * Club domestic league appearances and goals

- Jung Byung-tak
- Hangul: 정병탁
- RR: Jeong Byeongtak
- MR: Chŏng Pyŏngt'ak

Jung Byung-tak (1942 – 11 February 2016) was a South Korean footballer and football manager. He was a member of the Korean national football team in the 1960s. He was a former Korean national football team manager and the first manager of Chunnam Dragons
