= Majid Ariff =

Singaporean footballer and coach (1937–2018)

Personal information
- Date of birth: 2 June 1937
- Place of birth: Singapore
- Date of death: 4 February 2018 (aged 80)
- Place of death: Singapore
- Position: Striker

Majid Ariff (2 June 1937 – 4 February 2018) was a Singaporean football striker and coach. Majid, widely believed to be the finest footballer Singapore has produced and the only one to have played for the AFC Asian All Stars team in 1966, died of pneumonia, aged 80, on 4 February 2018.

Majid's most prominent protege is Fandi Ahmad. They were the only Singaporeans among 116 top Asian players to be nominated for Asia's Footballer of the Century award in 1998.
