= Football at the 1968 Summer Olympics – Men's Asian Qualifiers =

International sports competition

Tournament details
- Dates: 9 April 1967 – 30 June 1968
- Teams: 11 (from 1 confederation)

Tournament statistics
- Matches played: 23
- Goals scored: 116 (5.04 per match)

The Asian section of the 1968 Summer Olympics football qualification acted as qualifiers for the 1968 Summer Olympics football tournament held in Mexico, for football teams from Asia. Three slots in the final tournament were available for Asian teams.

== Groups ==
=== Group 1 ===
Pos	Team	Pld	W	D	L	GF	GA	GD	Pts	Qualification
1	Japan (H)	5	4	1	0	26	4	+22	9	Qualification for 1968 Summer Olympics
2	South Korea	5	4	1	0	17	5	+12	9	
3	Lebanon	5	2	1	2	18	9	+9	5	
4	South Vietnam	5	2	1	2	14	5	+9	5	
5	Taiwan	5	1	0	4	11	18	−7	2	
6	Philippines	5	0	0	5	3	48	−45	0	

Source: RSSSF
(H) Hosts

=== Group 2 ===
Pos	Team	Pld	W	D	L	GF	GA	GD	Pts	Qualification
1	Thailand (H)	4	3	0	1	5	6	−1	6	Qualification for 1968 Summer Olympics
2	Iraq	4	1	1	2	7	5	+2	3	
3	Indonesia	4	1	1	2	4	5	−1	3	
4	Hong Kong	0	0	0	0	0	0	0	0	Withdrew
5	Malaysia	0	0	0	0	0	0	0	0	Withdrew
6	Pakistan	0	0	0	0	0	0	0	0	Withdrew

Source: RSSSF
(H) Hosts

=== Group 3 ===
Pos	Team	Pld	W	D	L	GF	GA	GD	Pts	Qualification
1	Israel (H)	2	2	0	0	11	0	+11	4	Qualification for 1968 Summer Olympics
2	Ceylon	2	0	0	2	0	11	−11	0	
3	Burma	0	0	0	0	0	0	0	0	Withdrew
4	India	0	0	0	0	0	0	0	0	Withdrew
5	Iran	0	0	0	0	0	0	0	0	Withdrew
6	North Korea	0	0	0	0	0	0	0	0	Withdrew

Source: RSSSF
(H) Hosts

== Qualified teams ==
The following three teams from Asia qualified for the final tournament.

Team	Qualified as	Qualified on	Previous appearances in Summer Olympics^{1} ^{2}
Japan	Group 1 winners	10 October 1967	3 (1936, 1956, 1964)
Thailand	Group 2 winners	22 January 1968	1 (1956)
Israel	Group 3 winners	22 March 1968	0 (debut)

^{1} Bold indicates champions for that year. Italic indicates hosts for that year.
^{2} Includes all participations by a competing nation at the Summer Olympics (clubs representing nations, olympic teams, full national teams, etc.).
