= Football at the 1968 Summer Olympics – Men's European Qualifiers =

International sports competition

Tournament details
- Dates: 22 March 1967 – 1 June 1968
- Teams: 20 (from 1 confederation)

Tournament statistics
- Matches played: 26
- Goals scored: 75 (2.88 per match)

The European section of the 1968 Summer Olympics football qualification acted as qualifiers for the 1968 Summer Olympics football tournament held in Mexico, for football teams from Europe. Four slots in the final tournament were available for European teams.

== Format ==
Four groups of five teams compete in a home-and-away knockout stage. The winners of each group qualifies for the Summer Olympics football finals.

== Group 1 ==
Team 1	Agg.	Team 2	1st leg	2nd leg
First round
Soviet Union	w/o	Albania	—	—
Second round
Poland	1–3	Soviet Union	0–1	1–2
Czechoslovakia	w/o	Yugoslavia	—	—
Final round
Soviet Union	3–5	Czechoslovakia	3–2	0–3

== Group 2 ==
Team 1	Agg.	Team 2	1st leg	2nd leg
First round
Greece	0–10	East Germany	0–5	0–5
Second round
Turkey	2–6	Bulgaria	2–3	0–3
East Germany	2–0	Romania	1–0	1–0
Final round
Bulgaria	6–4	East Germany	4–1	2–3

== Group 3 ==
Team 1	Agg.	Team 2	1st leg	2nd leg
First round
Finland	1–0	Netherlands	0–0	1–0
Second round
Austria	4–2	Switzerland	4–1	0–1
Finland	2–4	France	1–1	1–3
Final round
France	4–2	Austria	3–1	1–1

== Group 4 ==
Team 1	Agg.	Team 2	1st leg	2nd leg
First round
Iceland	4–6	Spain	1–1	3–5
Second round
West Germany	1–2	Great Britain	0–2	1–0
Spain	w/o	Italy	—	—
Final round
Spain	1–0	Great Britain	1–0	0–0

== Qualified teams ==
The following four teams from Europe qualified for the final tournament.

Team	Qualified as	Qualified on	Previous appearances in Summer Olympics^{1} ^{2}
Spain	Group 4 winners	10 April 1968	3 (1920, 1924, 1928)
Bulgaria	Group 2 winners	24 April 1968	4 (1924, 1952, 1956, 1960)
France	Group 3 winners	12 May 1968	9 (1900, 1908, 1912, 1920, 1924, 1928, 1948, 1952, 1960)
Czechoslovakia	Group 1 winners	1 June 1968	3 (1920, 1924, 1964)

^{1} Bold indicates champions for that year. Italic indicates hosts for that year.
^{2} Includes all participations by a competing nation at the Summer Olympics (clubs representing nations, olympic teams, full national teams, etc.).
