= Huh Yoon-jung =

South Korean footballer (1936–2022)

Personal information
- Full name: Huh Yoon-jung
- Date of birth: 30 September 1936
- Place of birth: Jindo, Zenranan-dō, Korea, Empire of Japan
- Date of death: August 2022 (aged 85)
- Place of death: South Korea
- Position: Forward

Senior career*
Years	Team	Apps	(Gls)
1961–1962	ROK Air Force		
1962	ROK Army OPMG		
1963	ROK Army Engineer Corps		
1964–1966	Korea Coal Corporation		
1967–1968	Yangzee		
1968–1969	Sing Tao		
1970–1973	Seoul Bank		

International career
1964	South Korea B		
1963–1971	South Korea	49	(21)
Medal record
Men's football
Representing South Korea
AFC Asian Cup
Bronze medal – third place	1964 Israel	Team
- * Club domestic league appearances and goals

- Huh Yoon-jung
- Hangul: 허윤정
- Hanja: 許允正
- RR: Heo Yunjeong
- MR: Hŏ Yunjŏng

Huh Yoon-jung (30 September 1936 – August 2022) was a South Korean footballer who played as a forward.

== Playing career ==
In 1962, South Korea hosted the World Military Cup final and played against Greek national military team, the winners of the qualifiers. South Korea lost to Greece on aggregate, but Huh received attention by scoring the winning goal in the second leg. After the World Military Cup, Huh was selected for South Korean national team, playing in the 1964 Summer Olympics and the 1964 AFC Asian Cup. He is also the first South Korean footballer to join a foreign football club.

== Personal life ==
Huh was a relative of Huh Jung-moo, another famous South Korean footballer. (Some sources claimed Huh was Jung-moo's uncle.) Jung-moo started playing football after Huh urged him to become a youth football player. He died on August 2022.

== Honours ==
Korea Coal Corporation

- Korean National Championship: 1964

South Korea B

- AFC Asian Cup third place: 1964

Individual

- KASA Best Korean Footballer: 1967
