= Katsuyoshi Kuwahara =

Japanese footballer and manager

Katsuyoshi Kuwahara 桑原 勝義
Personal information
- Full name: Katsuyoshi Kuwahara
- Date of birth: May 30, 1944 (age 82)
- Place of birth: Fujieda, Shizuoka, Empire of Japan
- Position: Forward

Youth career
- Fujieda Higashi High School

Senior career*
Years	Team	Apps	(Gls)
- Nippon Light Metal
????–1971	Nagoya Mutual Bank		

International career
1965	Japan	2	(0)

Managerial career
- 1973–1982: Honda
- 1987–1992: PJM Futures
- * Club domestic league appearances and goals

Katsuyoshi Kuwahara (桑原 勝義, Kuwahara Katsuyoshi; born May 30, 1944) is a former Japanese football player and manager. He played for the Japan national team. His brother Takashi Kuwahara is also former footballer.

== Club career ==
Kuwahara was born in Fujieda on May 30, 1944. After graduating from high school, he played for Nippon Light Metal and Nagoya Mutual Bank. In 1971, Nagoya Mutual Bank was disbanded and he retired.

== National team career ==
On March 22, 1965, Kuwahara debuted for the Japan national team against Burma. On March 25, he also played against Singapore. He played two games for Japan in 1965.

== Coaching career ==
After retirement, Kuwahara became a manager for the Japanese Regional Leagues' club Honda in 1973. He was credited with getting the club promoted to the Japan Soccer League Division 2 in 1975 and Division 1 in 1981. He resigned in 1982. In 1987, he became a manager of a new club, the PJM Futures, and managed it until 1992.

== National team statistics ==
Japan national team
Year	Apps	Goals
1965	2	0
Total	2	0
