= Football at the 1964 Summer Olympics – Group B =

Football at the Summer Olympics group

Group B of the 1964 Summer Olympics football tournament took place from 11 to 15 October 1964. The group consisted of Hungary, Morocco and Yugoslavia. The top two teams, Hungary and Yugoslavia, advanced to the quarter-finals.

== Teams ==
Team	Region	Method of qualification	Date of qualification	Finals appearance	Last appearance	Previous best performance							
Team	Region	Method of qualification	Date of qualification	Finals appearance	Last appearance	Previous best performance	Yugoslavia	Europe	Holders	10 September 1960	7th	1960	Gold medal (1960)
Hungary	Europe	Europe Group 2 winners	7 May 1964	6th	1960	Gold medal (1952)							
Morocco	Africa	Africa Group 3 winners	24 May 1964	1st	—	—							
~~North Korea~~ (Note: North Korea withdrew prior to the final tournament.)	Asia	Asia Group 2 winners	28 June 1964	1st	—	—							

== Standings ==
Pos	Team	Pld	W	D	L	GF	GA	GD	Pts	Qualification
1	Hungary	2	2	0	0	12	5	+7	4	Advanced to knockout stage
2	Yugoslavia	2	1	0	1	8	7	+1	2	Advanced to knockout stage
3	Morocco	2	0	0	2	1	9	−8	0	
4	North Korea	0	0	0	0	0	0	0	0	Withdrew

Source: RSSSF

In the quarter-finals:

- The winners of Group B, Hungary, advanced to play the runners-up of Group A, Romania.
- The runners-up of Group B, Yugoslavia, advanced to play the winners of Group A, United Team of Germany.

== Matches ==
All times listed are local, JST (UTC+9).

=== Hungary vs Morocco ===
11 October 1964
15:00

Hungary	6–0	Morocco
Bene 13', 38' (pen.), 70', 74', 78', 87'	Report

National Olympic Stadium, Tokyo
Attendance: 65,793
Referee: Kim Duk-chun (South Korea)

19	József Gelei
3	Dezső Novák
5	Árpád Orbán
6	Kálmán Ihász
7	Gusztáv Szepesi
8	Károly Palotai
11	Imre Komora
12	Zoltán Varga
13	Ferenc Bene
15	János Farkas
16	Sándor Katona
Substitutions:
1	Antal Szentmihályi
2	Tibor Csernai
4	Benő Káposzta
9	István Nagy
10	György Nagy
14	Antal Dunai
17	Pál Orosz
18	Ferenc Nógrádi
Manager:
(Hungary) Lajos Baróti

1	Allal Benkassou
3	Mustapha Fahim
4	Abderrazak Nijam
5	Amar Bensiffedine
8	Mohamed Lamari
9	Abdelkader Mohamed
10	Driss Bamous
11	Ali Bendayan
13	Abdelghani El Mansouri
14	Abdelkader Moukhtatif
16	Abdelkader Morchid
Substitutions:
2	Abdellah Kastaiani
6	Moulay Khanousi
7	Sadni Nafai
12	Ahmed Laghrissi
15	Mohammed Sahraoui
17	Mohamed Kenzeddine
18	Ali Bouachra
Manager:
(Morocco) Mohamed Masson

Assistant referees:
Sumio Hayakawa (Japan)
Taro Ikeda (Japan)

=== Yugoslavia vs Morocco ===
13 October 1964
15:00

Yugoslavia	3–1	Morocco
Samardžić 8'; Belin 12', 59'	Report	Bouachra 2'

Mitsuzawa Soccer Stadium, Yokohama
Attendance: 12,765
Referee: Hussein Imam (United Arab Emirates)

1	Ivan Ćurković
2	Mirsad Fazlagić
3	Svetozar Vujović
4	Rudolf Belin
5	Milan Čop
6	Jovan Miladinović
7	Spasoje Samardžić
8	Slaven Zambata
9	Ivica Osim
10	Lazar Lemić
11	Dragan Džajić
Substitutions:
12	Zlatko Škorić
13	Živorad Jevtić
14	Lazar Radović
15	Marijan Brnčić
16	Đorđe Pavlić
17	Josip Pirmajer
18	Silvester Takač
Manager:
(Socialist Federal Republic of Yugoslavia) Ljubomir Lovrić

1	Allal Benkassou
3	Mustapha Fahim
4	Abderrazak Nijam
5	Amar Bensiffedine
8	Mohamed Lamari
9	Abdelkader Mohamed
10	Driss Bamous
11	Ali Bendayan
13	Abdelghani El Mansouri
14	Abdelkader Moukhtatif
16	Abdelkader Morchid
Substitutions:
2	Abdellah Kastaiani
6	Moulay Khanousi
7	Sadni Nafai
12	Ahmed Laghrissi
15	Mohammed Sahraoui
17	Mohamed Kenzeddine
18	Ali Bouachra
Manager:
(Morocco) Mohamed Masson

Assistant referees:
Yoshiyuki Maruyama (Japan)
Hiroshi Sato (Japan)

=== Yugoslavia vs Hungary ===
15 October 1964
15:00

Yugoslavia	5–6	Hungary
Osim 1', 82'; Belin 12', 35'; Zambata 31'	Report	Csernai 5', 11', 44', 63' (pen.); Farkas 18'; Bene 25' (pen.)

Komazawa Olympic Park Stadium, Tokyo
Attendance: 19,316
Referee: Genishi Fukushima (Japan)

1	Ivan Ćurković
2	Mirsad Fazlagić
3	Svetozar Vujović
4	Rudolf Belin
5	Milan Čop	Booked
6	Jovan Miladinović
7	Spasoje Samardžić
8	Slaven Zambata
9	Ivica Osim
11	Dragan Džajić
14	Lazar Radović
Substitutions:
12	Zlatko Škorić
10	Lazar Lemić
13	Živorad Jevtić
15	Marijan Brnčić
16	Đorđe Pavlić
17	Josip Pirmajer
18	Silvester Takač
Manager:
(Socialist Federal Republic of Yugoslavia) Ljubomir Lovrić

1	Antal Szentmihályi
2	Tibor Csernai
3	Dezső Novák
5	Árpád Orbán
6	Kálmán Ihász
8	Károly Palotai
11	Imre Komora
13	Ferenc Bene
15	János Farkas
16	Sándor Katona
18	Ferenc Nógrádi
Substitutions:
19	József Gelei
4	Benő Káposzta
7	Gusztáv Szepesi
9	István Nagy
10	György Nagy
12	Zoltán Varga
14	Antal Dunai
17	Pál Orosz
Manager:
(Hungary) Lajos Baróti

Assistant referees:
Sumio Hayakawa (Japan)
Yoshiyuki Maruyama (Japan)

== See also ==
- Hungary at the Olympics
- Yugoslavia at the Olympics
- Morocco at the Olympics
- North Korea at the Olympics
