= Morocco at the 1964 Summer Olympics =

- IOC code: MAR (MRC used at these Games)
- NOC: Moroccan Olympic Committee

in Tokyo
- Medals: Gold 0 Silver 0 Bronze 0 Total 0

Summer Olympics appearances (overview)
- 1960; 1964; 1968; 1972; 1976; 1980; 1984; 1988; 1992; 1996; 2000; 2004; 2008; 2012; 2016; 2020; 2024

Morocco competed at the 1964 Summer Olympics in Tokyo, Japan.

== Athletics ==
Men's 100 metres

- Bouchaib El-Maachi (6th in heat 2 of the quarterfinals)

Men's 200 metres

- Bouchaib El-Maachi (8th in heat 1 of the semifinals)

Men's 5,000 metres

- Ben Assou El-Ghazi DNS

Men's 3000 metres steeplechase

- Ben Assou El-Ghazi (9th)

Men's marathon

- Bakir Benaïssa or Ben Aissa (12th)

Men's shot put

- Lahcen Samsam Akka (18th in round 1)

== Boxing ==
Light welterweight

- Fatah Ben Farj (Note: also Bronze Medalist at the 1967 Mediterranean Games) (=17th)

Middleweight

- Lahcen Ahidous (Note: also competed at the 1968 Summer Olympics; Silver Medalist at the 1967 Mediterranean Games) (=9th)

== Football ==
Men's team competition

- Preliminary round (Group B)
  - Morocco – North Korea - not played, as North Korea had withdrawn from the entire Games
  - Morocco – Hungary 0-6
  - Morocco – Yugoslavia 1-3
  - → 3rd in group, did not advance
- Team roster
  - Abdelkader Mohamed, Abdelkader Moukhtatif, Abdelkader Morchid, Abderrazak Nijam, Ali Bendayan, Ali Bouachra, Amar Bensiffedine, Driss Bamous, Mohamed Lamari, Mustapha Fahim, Allal Benkassou, Abdelghani El Mansouri (DNS: Mohamed Al-Sahraoui, Moulay Idriss Kanoussi, Abdellah Kastaiani, Mohammed Kenzedine, Ahmed Laghrissi, Sadni Nafai)

== Weightlifting ==
Middleweight

- Abderrahim Tazi (Note: also competed at the 1960 Summer Olympics) (17th)

Light heavyweight

- Mustapha Adnane (Note: also competed at the 1960 Summer Olympics) (20th)
