= Football at the 1964 Summer Olympics – final =

Men's Football Summer Olympics final, held in Japan

1964 Summer Olympics football final
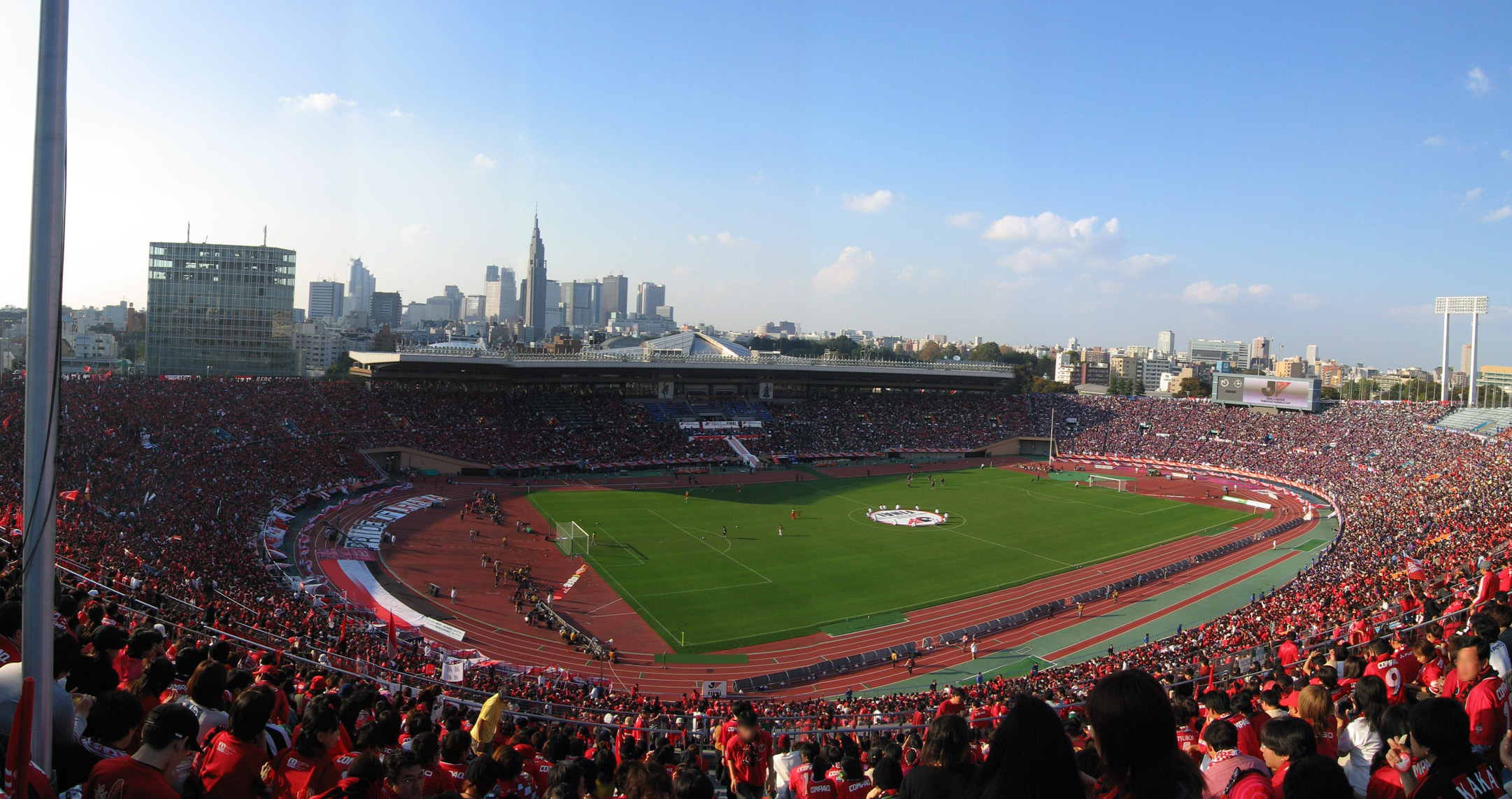
- National Stadium in Tokyo hosted the final
- Event: Football at the 1964 Summer Olympics
Hungary	Czechoslovakia
2	1
- Date: 23 October 1964
- Venue: Olympic Stadium, Tokyo
- Referee: Menachem Ashkenazi (Israel)
- Attendance: 65,610

The 1964 Summer Olympics football tournament gold medal match was the final match of the 1964 Summer Olympics football tournament, the 14th edition of Olympic competition for men's national football teams. The match was played at Olympic Stadium in Tokyo, Japan, on 23 October 1964, and was contested by Hungary and Czechoslovakia.

== Description ==
The tournament comprised hosts Japan, holders Yugoslavia and twelve other teams who emerged victorious from the qualification phase, The 14 teams competed in a group stage in the first round, from which eight teams qualified for the knockout stage. En route to the final, Hungary finished first in Group B with two wins (6–0 against Morocco and 6–5 against Yugoslavia). They then beat Romania 2–0 in the quarter-finals and United Arab Republic 6–0 in the semi-finals. Czechoslovakia finished first in Group C with three wins (6–1 against South Korea, 5–1 against United Arab Republic and 1–0 against Brazil), defeating hosts Japan 4–0 in the quarter-finals and United Team of Germany 2–1 in the semi-finals. The final took place in front of 65,610 spectators and was refereed by Menachem Ashkenazi.

After a goalless first half, Hungary opened the scoring in the first two minutes of the second half through an own goal by Vladimír Weiss before Ferenc Bene further increased their lead to 2–0 in the 59th minute. Jan Brumovský scored in the 80th minute to pull one back for Czechoslovakia. The match ended 2–1 to Hungary, who became the gold medalists for 1964.

== Route to the final ==
Hungary
	Opponent	Result
1	Morocco	6–0
2	Yugoslavia	6–5
QF	Romania	2–0
SF	United Arab Republic	6–0

Czechoslovakia
	Opponent	Result
1	South Korea	6–1
2	United Arab Republic	5–1
3	Brazil	1–0
QF	Japan	4–0
SF	United Team of Germany	2–1

== Match ==
=== Details ===
23 October 1964
17:30

Hungary	2–1	Czechoslovakia
Weiss 47' (o.g.); Bene 59'	Report	Brumovský 80'

Olympic Stadium, Tokyo
Attendance: 65,610
Referee: Menachem Ashkenazi (Israel)

Hungary	Czechoslovakia

GK	1	Antal Szentmihályi
RB	3	Dezső Novák
LB	6	Kálmán Ihász
RH	7	Gusztáv Szepesi
CH	5	Árpád Orbán
LH	18	Ferenc Nógrádi
OR	15	János Farkas
IR	2	Tibor Csernai
CF	13	Ferenc Bene
IL	11	Imre Komora
OL	16	Sándor Katona
Substitutions:
	19	József Gelei
	4	Benő Káposzta
	8	Károly Palotai
	9	István Nagy
	10	György Nagy
	12	Zoltán Varga
	14	Antal Dunai
	17	Pál Orosz
Manager:
(Hungary) Lajos Baróti

GK	1	František Schmucker
RB	2	Anton Urban
LB	4	Zdeněk Pičman
RH	5	Josef Vojta
CH	3	Vladimír Weiss
LH	6	Ján Geleta
OR	16	Jan Brumovský
IR	8	Ivan Mráz
CF	9	Karel Lichtnégl
IL	10	Vojtech Masný
OL	11	František Valošek
Substitutions:
	21	Anton Švajlen
	7	Ľudovít Cvetler
	12	Karel Knesl
	13	Štefan Matlák
	14	Karel Nepomucký
	15	František Knebort
Manager:
(Czechoslovakia) Rudolf Vytlačil

Assistant referees:
Miguel Comesaña (Japan)
John Stanley Wontumi (Ghana)

== See also ==
- Hungary at the Olympics
- Czechoslovakia at the Olympics
