= Football at the 2008 Summer Olympics – Men's tournament final =

Olympic Football final, held in China

2008 Summer Olympics Football Final
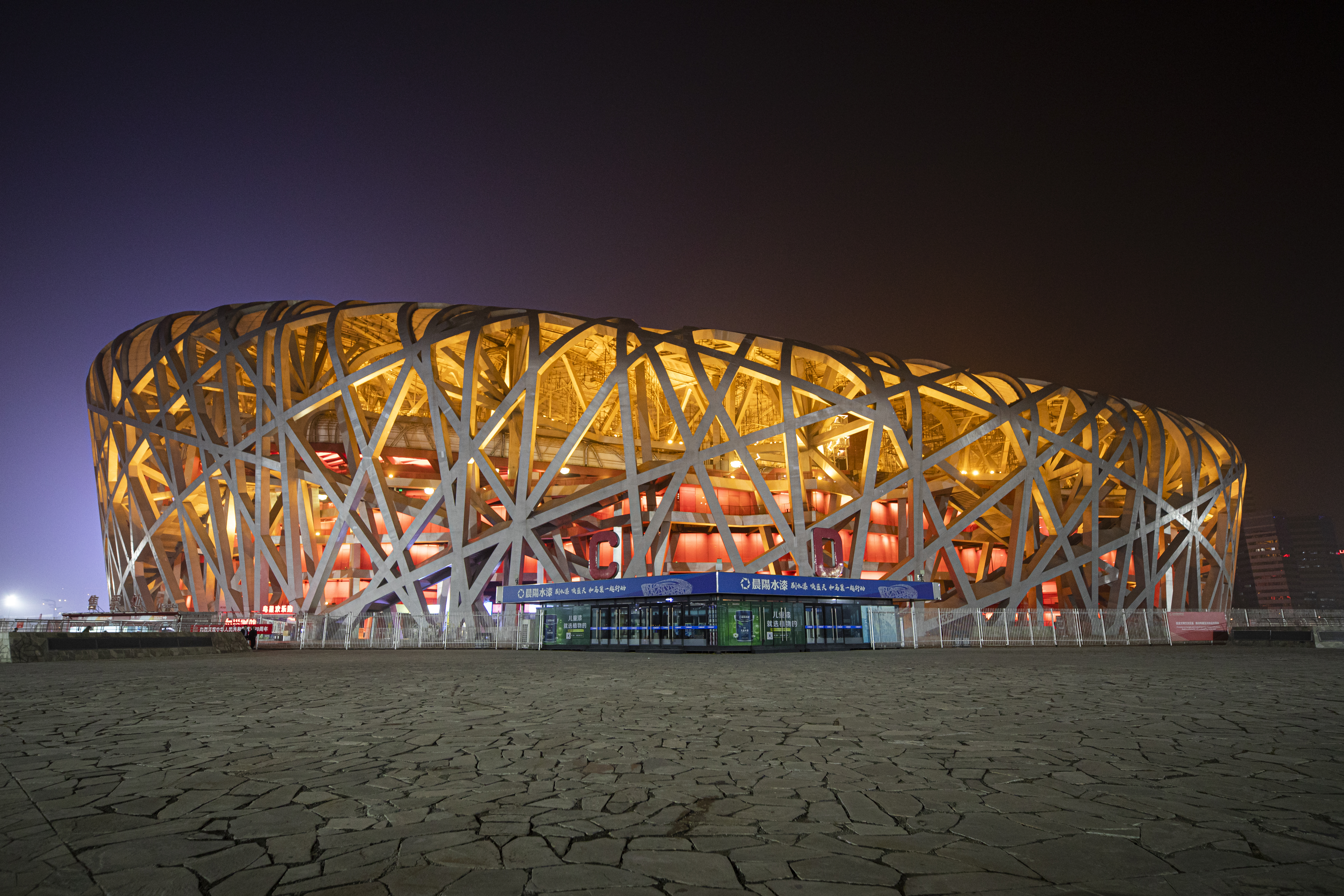
- Beijing National Stadium hosted the final
- Event: Football at the 2008 Summer Olympics – Men's tournament
| Nigeria | Argentina |
| 0 | 1 |
- Date: 23 August 2008
- Venue: National Stadium, Beijing
- Referee: Viktor Kassai (Hungary)
- Attendance: 89,102

The 2008 Summer Olympics Football Final was a football match that took place at the National Stadium in Beijing, China on 23 August 2008 to determine the winner of the men's football tournament at the 2008 Summer Olympics. It was the 22nd final of the men's football tournament at the Summer Olympics, a quadrennial tournament contested for the men's under-23 national teams of FIFA to decide the Olympic champions.

In front of a crowd of 89,102, Argentina won their second consecutive Olympic gold medal in football, beating Nigeria, 1–0.

== Background ==
Argentina was coached by Sergio Batista who assembled a squad featuring many of the players who had won the FIFA World Youth Championship in 2005 (Oscar Ustari, Nicolás Navarro, Ezequiel Garay, Pablo Zabaleta, Fernando Gago, Lionel Messi, Sergio Agüero) and 2007 (Sergio Romero, Federico Fazio, Éver Banega, Angel Di María, Lautaro Acosta, and Agüero once again).

Batista bolstered this group with the high-level quality of Juan Román Riquelme –himself a former youth champion, back in Malaysia in 1997– and the leadership of Javier Mascherano, who had won a gold medal four years earlier.

== Road to the final ==
The team had a successful run throughout the tournament, in the group stage they defeated Ivory Coast, Australia, and Serbia, before overcoming the Netherlands in the quarterfinals.

The semifinals featured a memorable matche for La Albiceleste which cruised to a 3–0 victory over Brazil –thanks to a brace from Sergio Agüero and a penalty goal by Juan Román Riquelme– to secure their ticket to the final.

== Route to the final ==
Nigeria
| R. | Opponent | Result |
|---|---|---|
| 1 | Netherlands | 0–0 |
| 2 | Japan | 2–1 |
| 3 | United States | 2–1 |
| QF | Ivory Coast | 2–0 |
| SF | Belgium | 4–1 |

Argentina
| R. | Opponent | Result |
|---|---|---|
| 1 | Ivory Coast | 2–1 |
| 2 | Australia | 1–0 |
| 3 | Serbia | 2–0 |
| QF | Netherlands | 2–1 (a.e.t.) |
| SF | Brazil | 3–0 |

== Match ==
=== Summary ===
In the decisive match against Nigeria, Argentina made the breakthrough in the second half. Ángel Di María latched onto a pass from Lionel Messi and chipped the ball over the goalkeeper, scoring the only goal of the afternoon and securing another gold medal for Argentine olympic football.

That squad featured players who would go on to play pivotal roles in the history of the senior national team. Lionel Messi, Ángel Di María, Sergio Agüero, Javier Mascherano, Juan Román Riquelme, and Ezequiel Garay, among others, were the key figures of the tournament.

=== Details ===
23 August 2008
12:00

| Nigeria | 0–1 | Argentina |
|---|---|---|
| | Report | Di María 58' |

National Stadium, Beijing
Attendance: 89,102
Referee: Viktor Kassai (Hungary)

Team details

Nigeria

| GK | 1 | Ambruse Vanzekin |
| DF | 5 | Dele Adeleye |
| DF | 4 | Onyekachi Apam (yellow card) 68' |
| DF | 2 | Chibuzor Okonkwo |
| DF | 13 | Olubayo Adefemi |
| MF | 8 | Sani Kaita |
| MF | 12 | Ajilore Oluwafemi |
| MF | 11 | Solomon Okoronkwo | (substituted off) 64' |
| FW | 9 | Victor Obinna (yellow card) 51' |
| FW | 14 | Peter Odemwingie |
| FW | 10 | Isaac Promise (c) | (substituted off) 70' |
Substitutes:
| FW | 16 | Victor Anichebe | (substituted on) 64' |
| MF | 17 | Emmanuel Ekpo | (substituted on) 70' |
Manager:
(Nigeria) Samson Siasia

Argentina

| GK | 18 | Sergio Romero |
| DF | 4 | Pablo Zabaleta |
| DF | 2 | Ezequiel Garay |
| DF | 12 | Nicolás Pareja |
| DF | 3 | Luciano Monzón (yellow card) 81' |
| MF | 11 | Ángel Di María | (substituted off) 88' |
| MF | 14 | Javier Mascherano |
| MF | 5 | Fernando Gago |
| MF | 10 | Juan Román Riquelme (c) (yellow card) 82' |
| FW | 15 | Lionel Messi | (substituted off) 90' |
| FW | 16 | Sergio Agüero | (substituted off) 79' |
Substitutes:
| MF | 7 | José Sosa | (substituted on) 79' |
| MF | 8 | Ever Banega | (substituted on) 88' |
| FW | 9 | Ezequiel Lavezzi | (substituted on) 90' |
Manager:
(Argentina) Sergio Batista
