= Football at the Summer Olympics =

- IOC Code: FBL
- Governing body: FIFA
- Events: 2 (men: 1; women: 1)

Summer Olympics
- 1896; 1900; 1904; 1908; 1912; 1920; 1924; 1928; 1932; 1936; 1948; 1952; 1956; 1960; 1964; 1968; 1972; 1976; 1980; 1984; 1988; 1992; 1996; 2000; 2004; 2008; 2012; 2016; 2020; 2024; 2028; 2032
- Medalists

Association football (Note: Officially referred to by the IOC simply as 'football'. For more information, see Names for association football.) has been included in every Summer Olympic Games as a men's competition sport, except 1896 (the inaugural Games) and 1932 (in an attempt to promote the new FIFA World Cup tournament). Women's football was added to the official program at the Atlanta 1996 Games.

A major difference between the men's and women's tournaments is that the men's tournament is not included in the FIFA International Match Calendar, while the women's tournament is included. This in turn means that clubs are not required to release players for the men's tournament, but must release players for the women's event.

In order to avoid competition with the Men's FIFA World Cup, FIFA have restricted participation of elite players in the men's tournament in various ways: currently, squads for the men's tournament are required to be composed of players under 23 years of age, with three permitted exceptions.

By comparison, the women's football tournament is a full senior-level international tournament, second in prestige only to the FIFA Women's World Cup.

== History ==
=== Pre-World Cup era ===
==== Beginnings ====
Football was not included in the program at the first modern Olympic Games in Athens in 1896, as international football was in its infancy at the time. Some sources claim however that an unofficial football tournament was organised during the first competition, with participating teams including Athens and Smyrna (İzmir), then part of the Ottoman Empire, but according to Bill Mallon's research, this is an error which has been perpetuated in multiple texts.

Tournaments were played at the 1900 and 1904 games and the Intercalated Games of 1906, but these were contested by various clubs and scratch teams. Although the IOC considers the 1900 and 1904 tournaments to be official Olympic events, they are not recognised by FIFA, and neither recognises the Intercalated Games today. In 1900 the competition was won by the London amateurs of Upton Park FC, representing Great Britain. The 1904 tournament was won by Canada, represented by Galt FC.

==== British successes ====
In the London Games of 1908 a proper international tournament was organised by the Football Association, featuring just six teams. The number of teams rose to eleven in 1912, when the competition was organised by the Swedish Football Association. Many of these early matches were unbalanced, as evidenced by high scoring games; two players, Sophus Nielsen in 1908 and Gottfried Fuchs in 1912, each scored ten goals in a single match. All players were amateurs, in accordance with the Olympic rules, which meant that countries could not send their full senior national teams. The National Olympic Committee for Great Britain and Ireland asked the Football Association to send an English national amateur team. Some of the English members played with professional clubs, most notably Derby County's Ivan Sharpe, Bradford City F.C. Harold Walden and Chelsea's Vivian Woodward. England won the first two official tournaments convincingly, beating Denmark both times.

==== 1920s and the rise of Uruguay ====
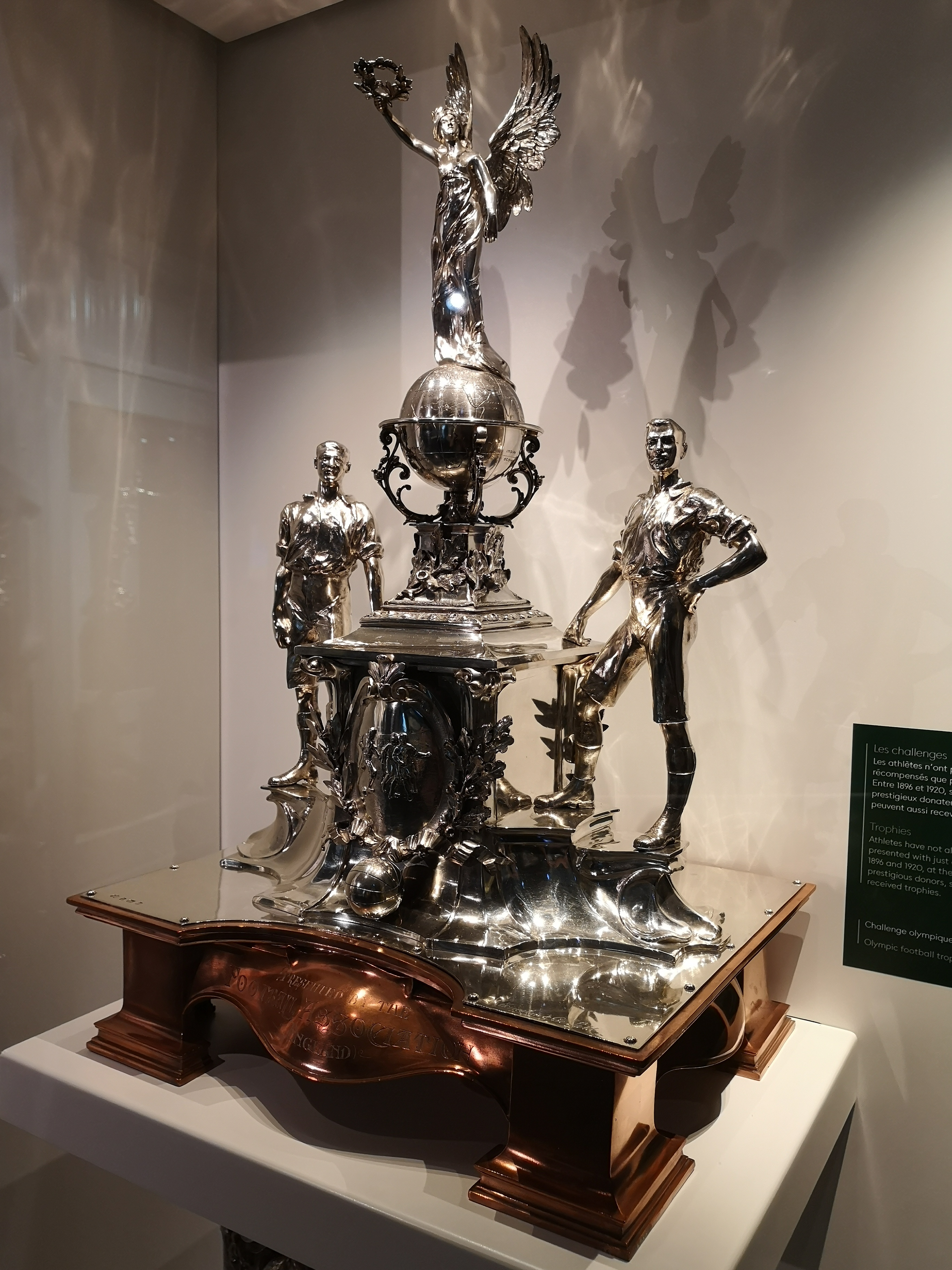
Olympic Challenge football trophy offered by The Football Association

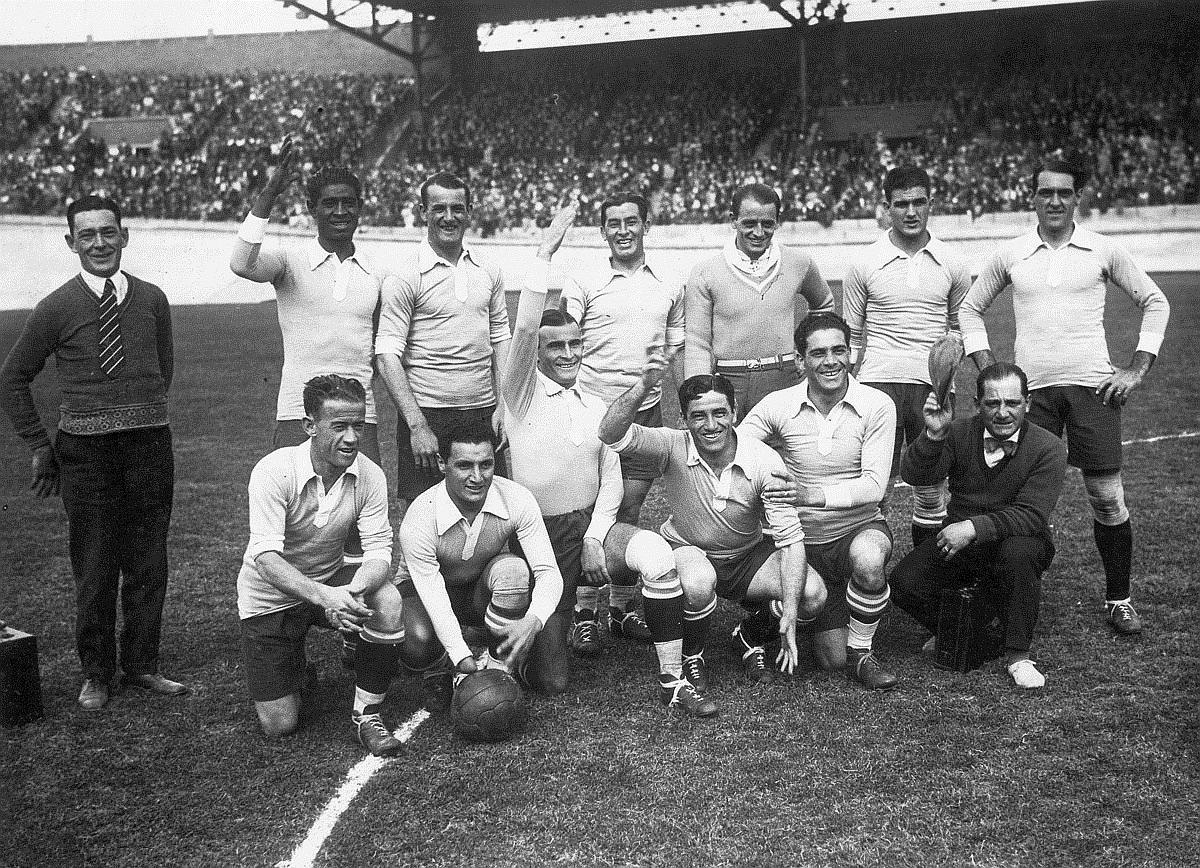
The Uruguay national football team that won the 1928 Olympic tournament

During the 1920 final against Belgium, the Czechoslovakia national football team walked off the field to protest the refereeing of John Lewis and the militarised mood within the stadium in Antwerp. This would be the final all-European football competition at the Olympic games, with Egypt, the United States, and Uruguay participating in 1924. FIFA organized the 1924 edition, desiring to create a true world championship for the first time; they implemented their own rules and opened the tournament up to professional player participation. With teams from new regions, the quality of play increased, as did fan interest. Uruguay dominated the tournament, winning their four games by a combined score of 15-1: the final was a 3–0 victory over Switzerland. In 1928, football was the most popular event at the games and the final was an all-South American affair. Because no other major international tournament existed yet, Uruguay defeated Argentina 2–1 in what David Goldblatt says was "football's first world championship". After the success of these tournaments, and not being in agreement with the Olympics on whether they should continue to allow professional player participation, FIFA decided to take their successful world championship model and go independent, now that they had the money and political status to do so, and created the World Cup.

=== After the first World Cup ===
==== Tumultuous '30s ====
Following Jules Rimet's proposal in 1929 to initiate a professional World Championship of Football, the sport was dropped from the 1932 Los Angeles Games by FIFA in an attempt to promote the new tournament. Football returned to controversy at the 1936 Berlin Games. The German organisers were intent on the return of the game to the Olympic movement since it guaranteed income into the organisation's coffers. The Italian team intimidated a referee. Peru scored a contested victory over Austria in overtime, with a fan invasion of the field at the very end. The Austrian team asked for the result to be annulled, and the game repeated. FIFA agreed, but the Peruvian team refused and left the Olympics.

==== Soviet Bloc dominance amid amateurism controversy ====
As professionalism spread around the world, the gap in quality between the World Cup and the Olympics widened. The countries that benefited most were the Soviet Bloc countries of Eastern Europe, where top athletes were state-sponsored while retaining their status as amateurs. As a result, young Western amateurs had to face seasoned and veteran Soviet Bloc teams, which put them at a significant disadvantage. All Olympic football tournaments from 1948 to 1980 were dominated by the Soviet Union and its satellites. Between 1948 and 1980, 23 out of 28 Olympic medals were won by Eastern Europe, with only Sweden (gold in 1948 and bronze in 1952), Denmark (bronze in 1948 and silver in 1960), and Japan (bronze in 1968) breaking their dominance. The next two tournaments saw some changes due to FIFA's changing of the call-up rules, with only Yugoslavia (bronze in 1984) and the Soviet Union (gold in 1988) winning medals for the Eastern Bloc.

==== Admission of professional players ====
For the 1984 Los Angeles Games, the IOC decided to admit professional players, but FIFA still did not want the Olympics or any other men's soccer competitions to rival the World Cup.

A compromise was struck that allowed teams from countries outside of UEFA and CONMEBOL to field their strongest sides, while restricting UEFA and CONMEBOL (the strongest confederations whose teams had played all finals and won every single World Cup title) countries to players who had not played in a World Cup.

The 1984 rules were maintained also for the 1988 edition, but with an additional rider: any European and South American footballer who had previously played less than 90 minutes in one single match of the World Cup was eligible.

==== 1992–present: Age restrictions introduced ====
Since 1992, male competitors have been required to be under 23 years old, and since 1996, a maximum of three over-23-year-old players have been allowed per squad. (Note: For the 2020 Summer Olympics, the age for the eligible players who had been already qualified were adjusted to under 24 years old, by reason of that Olympics being postponed to 2021 due to the COVID-19 pandemic.) African countries initially took advantage of this, with Nigeria and Cameroon winning in 1996 and 2000 respectively.

The FIFA International Match Calendar, which was adopted in 2006, does not include the Olympic men's tournament, so clubs are not required to release players for the men's tournament.

=== Performance disparity between Olympics and FIFA World Cup ===
Because of the unusual format and the separation from the main national teams that play the World Cup and top continental tournaments, historically strong men's national teams have unimpressive Olympic records. Uruguay, who won the last two tournaments prior to the World Cup's creation, only qualified again in 2012, after an 84-year absence. Argentina won silver twice (1928 and 1996) before the 2004 tournament, but its appearance in Athens 2004, in which it won the first gold medal, was only their seventh overall. Brazil's silver medals in the 1984, 1988 and 2012 editions were the best they had achieved until back-to-back golds in 2016 and 2020, the former on home soil. Italy has only won the Olympic title once, in 1936, although along with the two bronzes, the team has the highest number of appearances in the tournament, with 15, the last in 2008. France won the Olympic title in 1984, but only qualified twice ever since. A team from Germany won the gold medal only once, in 1976 (East Germany), and the reunified team did not make an Olympic appearance until 2016, when they won silver. Spain has won the gold medal twice in 1992 and 2024, the former as hosts, and the silver medal three times in 1920, 2000 and 2020, along with a few failures to qualify.

=== British non-involvement ===
Football in the United Kingdom has no single governing body, and there are separate teams for the UK's four Home Nations: England, Northern Ireland, Scotland and Wales. Furthermore, only the English Football Association (FA) is affiliated to the British Olympic Association (BOA), and the FA entered "Great Britain" teams to the football tournaments until 1972.

In 1974, the FA abolished the distinction between "amateur" and "professional" football, and ceased to enter the Olympics. Even though FIFA has allowed professionals at the Olympics since 1984, the FA did not re-enter, as the Home Nations were concerned that a united British Olympic team would set a precedent that might cause FIFA to question their separate status in other FIFA competitions, and even their status on or the existence of the International Football Association Board.

When London was selected to host the 2012 Games, there was pressure on the English FA to exercise the host nation's automatic right to field a team. In 2009 the plan agreed by the FA with the Welsh FA, Scottish FA and Irish FA was only to field English players, but the BOA overruled this, and ultimately there were Welsh players in the men's squad and Scots players in the women's squad. After the 2012 games, the FA decided that no team would be entered in subsequent men's tournaments, but was open to fielding a women's team again. The distinction recognised the importance and status of Olympic football in the women's international game.

For the 2020 tournament, FIFA stated that the women's UK team (not applied to the men's UK team) may enter the Olympics after the four FAs agreed, depending on the performance of women's English team in 2019 FIFA Women's World Cup (which serves as the European qualification for the Olympics). This brought women's football under the BOA jurisdiction in line with the long-standing qualification rules in field hockey and rugby sevens, although the home nation's sevens teams were subsumed into a standing Great Britain team in 2022.

== Venues ==
Due to the number of large stadia required for the Olympic tournament, venues in distant cities – often more than 200 km (120 mi) away from the main host – are typically used for the football tournament. In an extreme example, two early-round venues for the 1984 Games were on the East Coast of the United States, well over 2,000 miles (3,200 km) from the host city of Los Angeles. The next Games held in the United States, the 1996 Games, were unique in that no matches were held in the host city of Atlanta; the nearest venue and the site of the finals was 65 miles (105 km) away on the University of Georgia campus in Athens. In the tournament for the 2016 Games, all but one of the six football venues had previously hosted matches for the recent 2014 FIFA World Cup.

Counting the 2016 and 2020 Summer Olympics, there are 127 venues that have hosted Olympic football, the most of any sport.

Edition of the Olympic Games	City	Stadium
(Greece) Athens 1896	No official football tournament	
(France) Paris 1900	Paris	Vincennes Velodrome
(United States) St. Louis 1904	St. Louis	Francis Field
(United Kingdom) London 1908	London	White City Stadium
(Sweden) Stockholm 1912	Stockholm	Stockholm Olympic Stadium
(Sweden) Stockholm 1912	Stockholm	Råsunda Stadium
(Sweden) Stockholm 1912	Stockholm	Tranebergs Idrottsplats
(Belgium) Antwerp 1920	Antwerp	Olympic Stadium
(Belgium) Antwerp 1920	Antwerp	Stadion Broodstraat
(Belgium) Antwerp 1920	Brussels	Stade de l'Union St. Gilloise
(Belgium) Antwerp 1920	Ghent	Stade d'A.A. La Gantoise
(France) Paris 1924	Paris	Stade Olympique, Colombes
(France) Paris 1924	Paris	Stade Bergeyre
(France) Paris 1924	Paris	Stade de Paris, Saint-Ouen
(France) Paris 1924	Paris	Stade Pershing, Vincennes
(Netherlands) Amsterdam 1928	Amsterdam	Olympisch Stadion
(Netherlands) Amsterdam 1928	Amsterdam	Harry Elte Stadium
(United States) Los Angeles 1932	No football tournament	
(Germany) Berlin 1936	Berlin	Olympiastadion
(Germany) Berlin 1936	Berlin	Poststadion, Tiergarten
(Germany) Berlin 1936	Berlin	Mommsenstadion, Charlottenburg
(Germany) Berlin 1936	Berlin	Hertha-BSC-Platz
(United Kingdom) London 1948	London	Empire Stadium, Wembley
(United Kingdom) London 1948	London	White Hart Lane, Tottenham
(United Kingdom) London 1948	London	Selhurst Park, Crystal Palace
(United Kingdom) London 1948	London	Craven Cottage, Fulham
(United Kingdom) London 1948	London	Griffin Park, Brentford
(United Kingdom) London 1948	London	Arsenal Stadium, Highbury
(United Kingdom) London 1948	London	Lynn Road, Ilford
(United Kingdom) London 1948	London	Green Pond Road, Walthamstow
(United Kingdom) London 1948	London	Champion Hill, Dulwich
(United Kingdom) London 1948	Brighton	Goldstone Ground
(United Kingdom) London 1948	Portsmouth	Fratton Park
(Finland) Helsinki 1952	Helsinki	Olympiastadion
(Finland) Helsinki 1952	Helsinki	Töölö Football Grounds
(Finland) Helsinki 1952	Turku	Kupittaa Stadium
(Finland) Helsinki 1952	Tampere	Ratina Stadium
(Finland) Helsinki 1952	Lahti	Kisapuisto
(Finland) Helsinki 1952	Kotka	Kotka Stadium
(Australia) Melbourne 1956	Melbourne	Melbourne Cricket Ground
(Australia) Melbourne 1956	Melbourne	Olympic Park Stadium
(Italy) Rome 1960	Rome	Flaminio Stadium
(Italy) Rome 1960	Florence	Stadio Comunale
(Italy) Rome 1960	Grosseto	Stadio Comunale
(Italy) Rome 1960	Livorno	Stadio Ardenza
(Italy) Rome 1960	Pescara	Stadio Adriatico
(Italy) Rome 1960	L'Aquila	Stadio Comunale
(Italy) Rome 1960	Naples	Stadio Fuorigrotta
(Japan) Tokyo 1964	Tokyo	National Olympic Stadium
(Japan) Tokyo 1964	Tokyo	Prince Chichibu Memorial Field
(Japan) Tokyo 1964	Tokyo	Komazawa Stadium
(Japan) Tokyo 1964	Ōmiya	Omiya Soccer Stadium
(Japan) Tokyo 1964	Yokohama	Mitsuzawa Football Stadium
Mexico City 1968	Mexico City	Azteca Stadium
Mexico City 1968	Puebla	Estadio Cuauhtémoc
Mexico City 1968	Guadalajara	Estadio Jalisco
Mexico City 1968	León	Estadio León
(West Germany) Munich 1972	Munich	Olympiastadion
(West Germany) Munich 1972	Augsburg	Rosenaustadion
(West Germany) Munich 1972	Ingolstadt	ESV-Stadion
(West Germany) Munich 1972	Regensburg	Jahn Stadium
(West Germany) Munich 1972	Nuremberg	Städtisches Stadium
(West Germany) Munich 1972	Passau	Drei Flüsse Stadion
(Canada) Montreal 1976	Montreal	Olympic Stadium
(Canada) Montreal 1976	Sherbrooke	Municipal Stadium
(Canada) Montreal 1976	Toronto	Varsity Stadium
(Canada) Montreal 1976	Ottawa	Lansdowne Stadium
(Soviet Union) Moscow 1980	Moscow	Grand Central Lenin Stadium
(Soviet Union) Moscow 1980	Moscow	Dynamo Stadium
(Soviet Union) Moscow 1980	Leningrad	Kirov Stadium
(Soviet Union) Moscow 1980	Kyiv	Republican Stadium
(Soviet Union) Moscow 1980	Minsk	Dinamo Stadium
(United States) Los Angeles 1984	Pasadena, California	Rose Bowl
(United States) Los Angeles 1984	Boston	Harvard Stadium
(United States) Los Angeles 1984	Annapolis, Maryland	Navy–Marine Corps Memorial Stadium
(United States) Los Angeles 1984	Stanford, California	Stanford Stadium
(South Korea) Seoul 1988	Seoul	Olympic Stadium
(South Korea) Seoul 1988	Seoul	Dongdaemun Stadium
(South Korea) Seoul 1988	Busan	Busan Stadium
(South Korea) Seoul 1988	Daegu	Daegu Stadium
(South Korea) Seoul 1988	Daejeon	Daejeon Stadium
(South Korea) Seoul 1988	Gwangju	Gwangju Stadium
(Spain) Barcelona 1992	Barcelona	Camp Nou
(Spain) Barcelona 1992	Barcelona	Estadi de Sarrià
(Spain) Barcelona 1992	Sabadell	Estadi de la Nova Creu Alta
(Spain) Barcelona 1992	Zaragoza	Estadio La Romareda
(Spain) Barcelona 1992	Valencia	Estadio Luis Casanova
(United States) Atlanta 1996	Athens, Georgia	Sanford Stadium
(United States) Atlanta 1996	Orlando, Florida	Citrus Bowl
(United States) Atlanta 1996	Birmingham, Alabama	Legion Field
(United States) Atlanta 1996	Miami, Florida	Miami Orange Bowl
(United States) Atlanta 1996	Washington, D.C.	Robert F. Kennedy Memorial Stadium
(Australia) Sydney 2000	Sydney	Olympic Stadium
(Australia) Sydney 2000	Sydney	Sydney Football Stadium
(Australia) Sydney 2000	Brisbane	Brisbane Cricket Ground
(Australia) Sydney 2000	Adelaide	Hindmarsh Stadium
(Australia) Sydney 2000	Canberra	Bruce Stadium
(Australia) Sydney 2000	Melbourne	Melbourne Cricket Ground
(Greece) Athens 2004	Marousi	Olympic Stadium
(Greece) Athens 2004	Piraeus	Karaiskakis Stadium
(Greece) Athens 2004	Patras	Pampeloponnisiako Stadium
(Greece) Athens 2004	Volos	Panthessaliko Stadium
(Greece) Athens 2004	Thessaloniki	Kaftanzoglio Stadium
(Greece) Athens 2004	Heraklion	Pankritio Stadium
(China) Beijing 2008	Beijing	National Stadium
(China) Beijing 2008	Beijing	Workers' Stadium
(China) Beijing 2008	Tianjin	Tianjin Olympic Center Stadium
(China) Beijing 2008	Shanghai	Shanghai Stadium
(China) Beijing 2008	Qinhuangdao	Qinhuangdao Olympic Sports Center Stadium
(China) Beijing 2008	Shenyang	Shenyang Olympic Sports Center Stadium
(United Kingdom) London 2012	London	Wembley Stadium
(United Kingdom) London 2012	Glasgow	Hampden Park
(United Kingdom) London 2012	Cardiff	Millennium Stadium
(United Kingdom) London 2012	Coventry	City of Coventry Stadium (Note: City of Coventry Stadium and St. James Park were normally called Ricoh Arena and Sports Direct Arena respectively, but because of the IOC rules disallowing corporate sponsorship for event sites, they were renamed for the duration of the Games.)
(United Kingdom) London 2012	Manchester	Old Trafford
(United Kingdom) London 2012	Newcastle upon Tyne	St James' Park
(Brazil) Rio 2016	Rio de Janeiro	Maracanã
(Brazil) Rio 2016	Rio de Janeiro	João Havelange Olympic Stadium
(Brazil) Rio 2016	São Paulo	Arena Corinthians
(Brazil) Rio 2016	Brasília	Estádio Nacional Mané Garrincha
(Brazil) Rio 2016	Salvador	Arena Fonte Nova (Note: Arena Fonte Nova was normally called Itaipava Arena Fonte Nova, but because of the IOC rules disallowing corporate sponsorship for event sites, the venue was renamed for the duration of the Games.)
(Brazil) Rio 2016	Belo Horizonte	Estádio Mineirão
(Brazil) Rio 2016	Manaus	Arena da Amazônia
(Japan) Tokyo 2020
(Japan) Tokyo 2020	Tokyo	Tokyo Stadium (Note: Tokyo Stadium and International Stadium Yokohama were normally called Ajinomoto Stadium and Nissan Stadium respectively, but because of the IOC rules disallowing corporate sponsorship for event sites, the venue was renamed for the duration of the Games.)
(Japan) Tokyo 2020	Yokohama	International Stadium Yokohama
(Japan) Tokyo 2020	Kashima	Kashima Soccer Stadium
(Japan) Tokyo 2020	Saitama	Saitama Stadium 2002
(Japan) Tokyo 2020	Rifu	Miyagi Stadium
(Japan) Tokyo 2020	Sapporo	Sapporo Dome
(France) Paris 2024
(France) Paris 2024	Marseille	Stade Vélodrome
(France) Paris 2024	Décines-Charpieu (Lyon area)	Groupama Stadium
(France) Paris 2024	Paris	Parc des Princes
(France) Paris 2024	Bordeaux	Matmut Atlantique
(France) Paris 2024	Nantes	Stade de la Beaujoire
(France) Paris 2024	Nice	Allianz Riviera
(France) Paris 2024	Saint-Étienne	Stade Geoffroy-Guichard

== Events ==
Event	96	1900	04	08	12	20	24	28	32	36	48	52	56	60	64	68	72	76	80	84	88	92	96	2000	04	08	12	16	20	24	28	Years
Men's event		X	X	X	X	X	X	X		X	X	X	X	X	X	X	X	X	X	X	X	X	X	X	X	X	X	X	X	X	X	29
Women's event																							X	X	X	X	X	X	X	X	X	9
Total	0	1	1	1	1	1	1	1	0	1	1	1	1	1	1	1	1	1	1	1	1	1	2	2	2	2	2	2	2	2	2	

== Competition format ==
Since the 1992 Summer Olympics, Football games have always started before the opening ceremony because of the event's calendar which needs to be longer than other sports. From 1996 onwards, football has started two days before the games' opening ceremonies, and since then it has been a common condition for some sports.

For both the men's and women's tournaments, the competition consists of a round-robin group stage followed by a knockout stage. Teams are placed into groups of 4 teams, with each team playing each team in its group once. Teams earn 3 points for a win, 1 point for a draw, and 0 points for a loss. The top two teams in each group (as well as the top two third-place finishers, in the women's tournament) advance to the knockout rounds. The knockout rounds are a single-elimination tournament consisting of quarterfinals, semifinals, and the gold and bronze medal matches.

Matches consist of two halves of 45 minutes each. Since 2004, during the knockout rounds, if the match is tied after 90 minutes, two 15-minute halves of extra time are played (extra time is skipped in favour of immediate penalty kicks in the bronze medal match if it is played on the same day in the same stadium as the gold medal match). If the score remains tied, penalty kicks, which is 5 rounds, plus extra rounds if tied, are used to determine the winner.

The qualifying tournament, like that for the World Cup, is organised along continental lines. Most continental confederations organise a special Under-23 qualifying tournament, although the European qualifiers are drawn from the finalists of the UEFA Under-21 Championship. Teams participating in the preliminary and final competitions must be composed of U-23 players, with up to three players who are at least 23. For Paris 2024, U-23 players were born after 1 January 2001.

For the 2024 Games, the number of places allocated to each continent is:

- Europe – 4 (includes host France)
- Asia – 3 or 4
- Africa – 3 or 4
- South America – 2
- North America – 2
- Oceania – 1

== Team variants ==
=== Men ===
- 1900–1904: Club teams
- 1908–1948: National teams (full A)
- 1952–1980: National amateur teams (countries from Warsaw Pact, mainy Eastern Europe, competed with essentially professional players nominally employed by organs of the state such as armed forces)
- 1984–1988: National teams (with UEFA/CONMEBOL restrictions)
- 1992: National U23 team
- 1996–present: National U23 team (with three overage players)

=== Women ===
- 1996–present: National team (full A)

== Men's tournament ==
Men's Olympic football tournament
- Organiser(s): IOC; FIFA
- Founded: 1900
- Region: International
- Teams: 16 (finals) (from 6 confederations)
- Current champions: Spain (2nd title)
- Most championships: Great Britain; Hungary (3 titles each)
- 2028 Summer Olympics

=== Participating nations ===
Numbers refer to the final placing of each team at the respective Games. Host nation is shown in bold.

**UEFA**
Nation	00	04		08	12	20	24	28	36	48	52	56	60	64	68	72	76	80	84	88	92	96	00	04	08	12	16	20	24	28	Years
Austria	–	–		–	6	–	–	–	2	11	5	–	–	–	–	–	–	–	–	–	–	–	–	–	–	–	–	–	–		4
Belarus	Part of Russian Empire / Soviet Union																					–	–	–	–	10	–	–	–	–	1
Belgium	3	–		–	–	**1**	15	5	–	–	–	–	–	–	–	–	–	–	–	–	–	–	–	–	4	–	–	–	–		5
Bulgaria	–	–		–	–	–	10	–	–	–	17	3	5	–	2	–	–	–	–	–	–	–	–	–	–	–	–	–	–		5
Czech Republic	Part of Czechoslovakia																					–	14	–	–	–	–	–	–		1
Czechoslovakia	–	–		–	–	9	9	–	–	–	–	–	–	2	9	–	–	1	WD	–	–	Split into Slovakia and Czech Republic									5
Denmark	–	–		2	2	10	–	–	–	3	5	–	2	–	–	6	–	–	–	–	13	–	–	–	–	–	8	–	–		9
East Germany	–	–		–	–	–	–	–	–	–	WD	–	–	3	–	3	1	2	WD	–	Merged into West Germany (FRG)										4
Estonia	–	–		–	–	–	17	–	–	Part of Soviet Union											–	–	–	–	–	–	–	–	–	–	1
Finland	–	–		–	4	–	–	–	9	–	**14**	–	–	–	–	–	–	9	–	–	–	–	–	–	–	–	–	–	–		4
France	**2**	–		5	–	4	**5**	9	–	5	17	–	9	–	7	–	5	–	1	–	–	5	–	–	–	–	–	13	**2**		14
Germany	–	–		–	7	–	–	5	**5**	–	4	9	–	–	–	**5**	–	–	5	3	–	–	–	–	–	–	2	9	–		10
Great Britain	1	–		**1**	1	11	–	–	5	**4**	17	5	8	–	–	–	–	–	–	–	–	–	–	–	–	**5**	–	–	–		10
Greece	–	–		–	–	13	–	–	–	–	17	–	–	–	–	–	–	–	–	–	–	–	–	**15**	–	–	–	–	–		3
Hungary	–	–		–	5	–	13	–	9	–	1	WD	3	1	1	2	–	–	–	–	–	16	–	–	–	–	–	–	–		9
Ireland	–	–		–	–	–	7	–	–	17	–	–	–	–	–	–	–	–	–	–	–	–	–	–	–	–	–	–	–		2
Israel	Competed with Asia (qualified 2 times)																	–	–	–	–	–	–	–	–	–	–	–	15		1
Italy	–	–		–	8	5	6	3	1	5	9	–	**4**	DSQ	–	–	–	–	4	4	5	12	5	3	5	–	–	–	–		15
Latvia	–	–		–	–	–	16	–	–	Part of Soviet Union											–	–	–	–	–	–	–	–	–	–	1
Lithuania	–	–		–	–	–	17	–	–	Part of Soviet Union											–	–	–	–	–	–	–	–	–	–	1
Luxembourg	–	–		–	–	12	11	9	9	9	9	–	–	–	–	–	–	–	–	–	–	–	–	–	–	–	–	–	–		6
Netherlands	–	–		3	3	3	4	**9**	–	9	17	–	–	–	–	–	–	–	–	–	–	–	–	–	7	–	–	–	–		8
Norway	–	–		–	9	7	–	–	3	–	14	–	–	–	–	–	–	–	10	–	–	–	–	–	–	–	–	–	–		5
Poland	–	–		–	–	–	17	–	4	–	9	–	10	–	–	1	2	–	–	–	2	–	–	–	–	–	–	–	–		7
Portugal	–	–		–	–	–	–	5	–	–	–	–	–	–	–	–	–	–	–	–	–	4	–	14	–	–	6	–	–		4
Romania	–	–		–	–	–	14	–	–	–	17	–	–	5	–	–	–	–	–	–	–	–	–	–	–	–	–	11	–		4
Russia	–	–		–	10	–	Part of Soviet Union															–	–	–	–	–	–	–	DSQ	DSQ	1
Serbia	–	–		–	–	Part of Yugoslavia / Serbia and Montenegro																			12	–	–	–	–		1
Serbia and Montenegro	–	–		–	–	Part of Yugoslavia															–	–	–	16	Split into 2 nations						1
Slovakia	Part of Czechoslovakia																					–	13	–	–	–	–	–	–		1
Soviet Union	As the Russian Empire						–	–	–	–	9	1	–	–	–	3	3	**3**	WD	1	–	Split into 15 nations, with Russia as successor									6
Spain	–	–		–	–	2	17	5	–	–	–	–	–	–	6	–	12	10	–	–	**1**	6	2	–	–	14	–	2	1		12
Sweden	–	–		4	**11**	6	3	–	9	1	3	–	–	–	–	–	–	–	–	6	6	–	–	–	–	–	15	–	–	–	10
Switzerland	–	–		–	–	–	2	9	–	–	–	–	–	–	–	–	–	–	–	–	–	–	–	–	–	13	–	–	–		3
Turkey	–	–		–	–	–	17	9	9	5	5	WD	14	–	–	–	–	–	–	–	–	–	–	–	–	–	–	–	–		6
Ukraine	Part of Russian Empire / Soviet Union																					–	–	–	–	–	–	–	9		1
Yugoslavia	–	–		–	–	9	17	9	–	2	2	2	1	6	–	–	–	4	3	10	–	Split into 5, later 6 nations									11
**CONMEBOL**
Nation	00	04		08	12	20	24	28	36	48	52	56	60	64	68	72	76	80	84	88	92	96	00	04	08	12	16	20	24	28	Years
Argentina	–	–		–	–	–	–	2	–	–	–	–	7	10	–	–	–	WD	–	8	–	2	–	1	1	–	11	10	7		10
Brazil	–	–		–	–	–	–	–	–	–	5	–	6	9	13	13	4	–	2	2	–	3	7	–	3	2	**1**	1	–		14
Chile	–	–		–	–	–	–	17	–	–	17	–	–	–	–	–	–	–	7	–	–	–	3	–	–	–	–	–	–		4
Colombia	–	–		–	–	–	–	–	–	–	–	–	–	–	10	11	–	11	–	–	14	–	–	–	–	–	6	–	–		5
Paraguay	–	–		–	–	–	–	–	–	–	–	–	–	–	–	–	–	–	–	–	7	–	–	2	–	–	–	–	6		3
Peru	–	–		–	–	–	–	–	5	–	–	–	11	–	–	–	–	–	–	–	–	–	–	–	–	–	–	–	–		2
Uruguay	–	–		–	–	–	1	1	–	–	–	–	–	–	–	–	WD	–	–	–	–	–	–	–	–	9	–	–	–		3
Venezuela	–	–		–	–	–	–	–	–	–	–	–	–	–	–	–	–	12	–	–	–	–	–	–	–	–	–	–	–		1
**CONCACAF**
Nation	00	04		08	12	20	24	28	36	48	52	56	60	64	68	72	76	80	84	88	92	96	00	04	08	12	16	20	24	28	Years
Canada	–	1		–	–	–	–	–	–	–	–	–	–	–	–	–	**13**	–	6	–	–	–	–	–	–	–	–	–	–	–	3
Costa Rica	–	–		–	–	–	–	–	–	–	–	–	–	–	–	–	–	16	13	–	–	–	–	8	–	–	–	–	–	–	3
Cuba	–	–		–	–	–	–	–	–	–	–	–	–	–	–	–	11	7	–	–	–	–	–	–	–	–	–	–	–	–	2
Dominican Republic	–	–		–	–	–	–	–	–	–	–	–	–	–	–	–	–	–	–	–	–	–	–	–	–	–	–	–	12	–	1
El Salvador	–	–		–	–	–	–	–	–	–	–	–	–	–	15	–	–	–	–	–	–	–	–	–	–	–	–	–	–	–	1
Guatemala	–	–		–	–	–	–	–	–	–	–	–	–	–	8	–	10	–	–	16	–	–	–	–	–	–	–	–	–	–	3
Honduras	–	–		–	–	–	–	–	–	–	–	–	–	–	–	–	–	–	–	–	–	–	10	–	16	7	4	14	–	–	5
Mexico	–	–		–	–	–	–	9	–	11	–	–	–	11	**4**	7	9	–	–	DSQ	10	7	–	10	–	1	9	3	–	Q	13
Netherlands Antilles	–	–		–	–	–	–	–	–	–	14	–	–	–	–	–	–	–	–	–	–	–	–	–	–	Split into 2 nations					1
United States	–	**2**	**3**	–	–	–	12	9	9	11	17	5	–	–	–	14	–	WD	**9**	12	9	**10**	4	–	9	–	–	–	8	**Q**	16
**CAF**
Nation	00	04		08	12	20	24	28	36	48	52	56	60	64	68	72	76	80	84	88	92	96	00	04	08	12	16	20	24	28	Years
Algeria	–	–		–	–	–	–	–	–	–	–	–	–	–	–	–	–	8	–	–	–	–	–	–	–	–	14	–	–		2
Cameroon	–	–		–	–	–	–	–	–	–	–	–	–	–	–	–	–	–	11	–	–	–	1	–	8	–	–	–	–		3
Egypt	–	–		–	–	8	8	4	9	11	9	WD	12	4	–	–	–	WD	8	–	12	–	–	–	–	8	–	8	4		13
Gabon	–	–		–	–	–	–	–	–	–	–	–	–	–	–	–	–	–	–	–	–	–	–	–	–	12	–	–	–		1
Ghana	–	–		–	–	–	–	–	–	–	–	–	–	7	12	16	WD	WD	–	–	3	8	–	9	–	–	–	–	–		6
Guinea	–	–		–	–	–	–	–	–	–	–	–	–	–	11	–	–	–	–	–	–	–	–	–	–	–	–	–	16		2
Ivory Coast	–	–		–	–	–	–	–	–	–	–	–	–	–	–	–	–	–	–	–	–	–	–	–	6	–	–	7	–		2
Mali	–	–		–	–	–	–	–	–	–	–	–	–	–	–	–	–	–	–	–	–	–	–	5	–	–	–	–	14		2
Morocco	–	–		–	–	–	–	–	–	–	–	–	–	13	WD	8	–	–	12	–	15	–	16	10	–	11	–	–	3		8
Nigeria	–	–		–	–	–	–	–	–	–	–	–	–	–	14	–	WD	13	–	15	–	1	8	–	2	–	3	–	–		7
Senegal	–	–		–	–	–	–	–	–	–	–	–	–	–	–	–	–	–	–	–	–	–	–	–	–	6	–	–	–		1
South Africa	–	–		–	–	–	–	–	–	–	–	–	Banned due the Apartheid								–	–	11	–	–	–	13	16	–		3
Sudan	–	–		–	–	–	–	–	–	–	–	–	–	–	–	15	–	–	–	–	–	–	–	–	–	–	–	–	–		1
Tunisia	–	–		–	–	–	–	–	–	–	–	–	15	–	–	–	–	–	–	13	–	14	–	12	–	–	–	–	–		4
Zambia	–	–		–	–	–	–	–	–	–	–	–	–	–	–	–	WD	15	–	5	–	–	–	–	–	–	–	–	–		2
**AFC**
Nation	00	04		08	12	20	24	28	36	48	52	56	60	64	68	72	76	80	84	88	92	96	00	04	08	12	16	20	24	28	Years
Afghanistan	–	–		–	–	–	–	–	–	17	–	–	–	–	–	–	–	–	–	–	–	–	–	–	–	–	–	–	–		1
Australia	Competed with Oceania (qualified 6 times)																								11	–	–	12	–		2
China	–	–		–	–	–	–	–	9	11	–	WD	–	–	–	–	–	–	–	14	–	–	–	–	**13**	–	–	–	–		4
Chinese Taipei	–	–		–	–	–	–	–	–	–	–	–	16	–	–	–	–	–	–	–	–	–	–	–	–	–	–	–	–		1
India	–	–		–	–	–	–	–	–	11	17	4	13	–	–	–	–	–	–	–	–	–	–	–	–	–	–	–	–		4
Indonesia	–	–		–	–	–	–	–	–	–	–	5	–	–	–	–	–	–	–	–	–	–	–	–	–	–	–	–	–		1
Iran	–	–		–	–	–	–	–	–	–	–	–	–	12	–	12	7	WD	–	–	–	–	–	–	–	–	–	–	–		3
Iraq	–	–		–	–	–	–	–	–	–	–	–	–	–	–	–	–	5	14	9	–	–	–	4	–	–	12	–	10		6
Israel	–	–		–	–	–	–	–	–	–	–	–	–	–	5	–	6	–	Competed with Europe (qualified 1 time)												2
Japan	–	–		–	–	–	–	–	5	–	–	9	–	**8**	3	–	–	–	–	–	–	9	6	13	15	4	10	**4**	5		12
Kuwait	–	–		–	–	–	–	–	–	–	–	–	–	–	–	–	–	6	–	–	16	–	12	–	–	–	–	–	–		3
Malaysia	–	–		–	–	–	–	–	–	–	–	–	–	–	–	10	–	WD	–	–	–	–	–	–	–	–	–	–	–		1
Myanmar	–	–		–	–	–	–	–	–	–	–	–	–	–	–	9	–	–	–	–	–	–	–	–	–	–	–	–	–		1
North Korea	–	–		–	–	–	–	–	–	–	–	–	–	WD	–	–	8	–	–	–	–	–	–	–	–	–	–	–	–		1
Qatar	–	–		–	–	–	–	–	–	–	–	–	–	–	–	–	–	–	15	–	8	–	–	–	–	–	–	–	–		2
Saudi Arabia	–	–		–	–	–	–	–	–	–	–	–	–	–	–	–	–	–	16	–	–	15	–	–	–	–	–	15	–		3
South Korea	–	–		–	–	–	–	–	–	5	–	–	–	14	–	–	–	–	–	**11**	11	11	9	6	10	3	5	5	–		11
Syria	–	–		–	–	–	–	–	–	–	–	–	–	–	–	–	–	14	–	–	–	–	–	–	–	–	–	–	–		1
Thailand	–	–		–	–	–	–	–	–	–	–	9	–	–	16	–	–	–	–	–	–	–	–	–	–	–	–	–	–		2
United Arab Emirates	–	–		–	–	–	–	–	–	–	–	–	–	–	–	–	–	–	–	–	–	–	–	–	–	15	–	–	–		1
Uzbekistan	Part of Russian Empire / Soviet Union																					–	–	–	–	–	–	–	13		1
**OFC**
Nation	00	04		08	12	20	24	28	36	48	52	56	60	64	68	72	76	80	84	88	92	96	00	04	08	12	16	20	24	28	Years
Australia	–	–		–	–	–	–	–	–	–	–	**5**	–	–	–	–	–	–	–	7	4	13	**15**	7	AFC (qualified 2 times)						6
Fiji	–	–		–	–	–	–	–	–	–	–	–	–	–	–	–	–	–	–	–	–	–	–	–	–	–	16	–	–		1
New Zealand	–	–		–	–	–	–	–	–	–	–	–	–	–	–	–	–	–	–	–	–	–	–	–	14	16	–	6	11		4
**Total nations**	**3**	**2**		**5**	**11**	**14**	**22**	**17**	**16**	**18**	**25**	**11**	**16**	**14**	**16**	**16**	**13**	**16**	**16**	**16**	**16**	**16**	**16**	**16**	**16**	**16**	**16**	**16**	**16**	**12**	

=== Results ===
Keys

- Contested by club teams instead of proper national squads
- Playoff match after the final ended in a tie

Ed.	Year	Hosts	Gold medal match			Bronze medal match			Num. teams
Ed.	Year	Hosts	(gold) Gold medalists	Score	(silver) Silver medalists	(bronze) Bronze medalists	Score	Fourth place	Num. teams
– (Note: This tournament was part of the unofficial programme, or a demonstration sport, during the 1896 Olympic Games)	1896	Athens	(No official tournament held)						
1 (Note: This tournament was originally a pair of demonstration matches between the three teams, but has subsequently been upgraded to official status by the IOC with medals attributed to the teams based upon the match results.)	1900	Paris	(United Kingdom) **Great Britain** (Note: Represented by the Upton Park F.C.)	– (Note: No final was held as it was played under a round-robin format.)	France (Note: Represented by the Club Français.)	Belgium (Note: Represented by the University of Brussels, included one British and one Dutch player.)	–	– (Note: Three teams participated in the tournament.)	3
2	1904	St. Louis	**Canada** (Note: Represented by the Galt F.C.)	–	United States (Note: Represented by the Christian Brothers College.)	United States (Note: Represented by the St. Rose Parish.)	–	–	3
3	1908	London	**Great Britain**	2–0	Denmark	Netherlands	2–0	Sweden	6
4	1912	Stockholm	**Great Britain**	4–2	Denmark	Netherlands	9–0	Finland	11
5	1920	Antwerp	**Belgium**	– (Note: The 1920 final between Belgium and Czechoslovakia was abandoned in the 39th minute with Belgium leading 2–0 after Czechoslovakia walked off to protest the officiating; they were ejected from the competition, and a second tournament to determine the other medalists was held, with Spain beating the Netherlands for second place 3–1.)	Spain	Netherlands	–	Italy	14
6	1924	Paris	**Uruguay**	3–0	Switzerland	Sweden	1–1 (a.e.t.)	Netherlands	22
6	1924	Paris	**Uruguay**	3–0	Switzerland	Sweden	3–1	Netherlands	22
7	1928	Amsterdam	**Uruguay**	1–1 (a.e.t.)	Argentina	Italy	11–3	Egypt	17
7	1928	Amsterdam	**Uruguay**	2–1	Argentina	Italy	11–3	Egypt	17
–	1932	Los Angeles	(No tournament held)						
8	1936	Berlin	**Italy**	2–1 (a.e.t.)	Austria	Norway	3–2	Poland	16
9	1948	London	**Sweden**	3–1	Yugoslavia	Denmark	5–3	Great Britain	18
10	1952	Helsinki	**Hungary**	2–0	Yugoslavia	Sweden	2–0	Germany	25
11	1956	Melbourne	**Soviet Union**	1–0	Yugoslavia	Bulgaria	3–0	India	11
12	1960	Rome	**Yugoslavia**	3–1	Denmark	Hungary	2–1	Italy	16
13	1964	Tokyo	**Hungary**	2–1	Czechoslovakia	United Team of Germany	3–1	United Arab Republic	14
14	1968	Mexico City	**Hungary**	4–1	Bulgaria	Japan	2–0	Mexico	16
15	1972	Munich	**Poland**	2–1	Hungary	East Germany; Soviet Union	2–2 (a.e.t.)	– (Note: Bronze medal shared.)	16
16	1976	Montreal	**East Germany**	3–1	Poland	Soviet Union	2–0	Brazil	13
17	1980	Moscow	**Czechoslovakia**	1–0	East Germany	Soviet Union	2–0	Yugoslavia	16
18	1984	Los Angeles	**France**	2–0	Brazil	Yugoslavia	2–1	Italy	16
19	1988	Seoul	**Soviet Union**	2–1 (a.e.t.)	Brazil	West Germany	3–0	Italy	16
20	1992	Barcelona	**Spain**	3–2	Poland	Ghana	1–0	Australia	16
21	1996	Atlanta	**Nigeria**	3–2	Argentina	Brazil	5–0	Portugal	16
22	2000	Sydney	**Cameroon**	2–2 (a.e.t.) (5–3 p)	Spain	Chile	2–0	United States	16
23	2004	Athens	**Argentina**	1–0	Paraguay	Italy	1–0	Iraq	16
24	2008	Beijing	**Argentina**	1–0	Nigeria	Brazil	3–0	Belgium	16
25	2012	London	**Mexico**	2–1	Brazil	South Korea	2–0	Japan	16
26	2016	Rio de Janeiro	**Brazil**	1–1 (a.e.t.) (5–4 p)	Germany	Nigeria	3–2	Honduras	16
27	2020	Tokyo	**Brazil**	2–1 (a.e.t.)	Spain	Mexico	3–1	Japan	16
28	2024	Paris	**Spain**	5–3 (a.e.t.)	France	Morocco	6–0	Egypt	16
29	2028	Los Angeles							12

=== Performances by countries ===
Below are the 41 nations that have reached at least the semi-finals in the Summer Olympics finals.

Team	Gold medals	Silver medals	Bronze medals	Fourth place	Medals
Hungary	**3** (1952, 1964, 1968)	1 (1972)	1 (1960)		5
Great Britain	**3** (1900, 1908, 1912)			1 (1948)	3
Brazil	2 (2016, 2020)	**3** (1984, 1988, 2012)	2 (1996, 2008)	1 (1976)	**7**
Spain	2 (1992, 2024)	**3** (1920, 2000, 2020)			5
Argentina	2 (2004, 2008)	2 (1928, 1996)			4
Soviet Union	2 (1956, 1988)		**3** (1972, 1976, 1980)		5
Uruguay	2 (1924, 1928)				2
Yugoslavia	1 (1960)	**3** (1948, 1952, 1956)	1 (1984)	1 (1980)	5
Poland	1 (1972)	2 (1976, 1992)		1 (1936)	3
France	1 (1984)	2 (1900, 2024)			3
East Germany	1 (1976)	1 (1980)	1 (1972)		3
Nigeria	1 (1996)	1 (2008)	1 (2016)		3
Czechoslovakia	1 (1980)	1 (1964)			2
Italy	1 (1936)		2 (1928, 2004)	**4** (1920, 1960, 1984, 1988)	3
Sweden	1 (1948)		2 (1924, 1952)	1 (1908)	3
Belgium	1 (1920)		1 (1900)	1 (2008)	2
Mexico	1 (2012)		1 (2020)	1 (1968)	2
Canada	1 (1904)				1
Cameroon	1 (2000)				1
Denmark		**3** (1908, 1912, 1960)	1 (1948)		4
United States		1 (1904)	1 (1904)	1 (2000)	2
Bulgaria		1 (1968)	1 (1956)		2
Germany		1 (2016)		1 (1952)	1
Switzerland		1 (1924)			1
Austria		1 (1936)			1
Paraguay		1 (2004)			1
Netherlands			**3** (1908, 1912, 1920)	1 (1924)	3
Japan			1 (1968)	2 (2012, 2020)	1
Norway			1 (1936)		1
United Team of Germany			1 (1964)		1
West Germany			1 (1988)		1
Ghana			1 (1992)		1
Chile			1 (2000)		1
South Korea			1 (2012)		1
Morocco			1 (2024)		1
Egypt				3 (1928, 1964, 2024)	0
Finland				1 (1912)	0
India				1 (1956)	0
Australia				1 (1992)	0
Portugal				1 (1996)	0
Iraq				1 (2004)	0
Honduras				1 (2016)	0

== Women's tournament ==
Women's Olympic football tournament
- Organiser(s): IOC; FIFA
- Founded: 1996; 30 years ago
- Region: International
- Teams: 12 (finals) (from 6 confederations)
- Current champions: United States (5th title)
- Most championships: United States (5 titles)
- 2024 Summer Olympics

The women's tournament is contested between the full senior national teams, with no restrictions. One place is reserved for the host country. Of the remaining teams, as in World Cup contests, a specific number of places are reserved for teams from each continental region; the European (UEFA) teams until 2020 are chosen from the most successful European teams in the previous year's World Cup; the UEFA Women's Nations League which its finals is held in the same year as the Olympics was used from 2024, while the other continental regions host their own qualifying tournaments in the build-up to the Olympics.

The first women's tournament was at the 1996 Atlanta Games. The United States won the gold medal. Norway defeated the U.S. in 2000 by a golden goal that was highly controversial and seemed like a handball, but was allowed to stand. The finals of the next two tournaments, in 2004 and 2008, also went to extra time, with the U.S. defeating Brazil both times. In 2012 the U.S. won their fourth gold medal defeating Japan 2–1 in the final. In 2016 Germany won its first gold, defeating in the final Sweden, who upset in the succession the U.S. and hosts Brazil. In 2020, Canada won gold on penalties over Sweden, having previously also beaten Brazil and the U.S.

Allocation of places for each continent in the 2024 Games was:

- Europe – 3 (includes host France)
- Africa – 2
- Asia – 2
- South America – 2
- North America – 2
- Oceania – 1

=== Participating nations ===
Numbers refer to the final placing of each team at the respective Games. Host nation is shown in bold.

**UEFA**
Nation	96	00	04	08	12	16	20	24	28	Years
Denmark	8	–	–	–	–	–	–	–		1
France	–	–	–	–	4	6	–	**6**		3
Germany	5	3	3	3	–	1	–	3		6
Great Britain	–	–	–	–	**5**	–	7	–		2
Greece	–	–	**10**	–	–	–	–	–		1
Netherlands	–	–	–	–	–	–	5	–		1
Norway	3	1	–	7	–	–	–	–		3
Spain	–	–	–	–	–	–	–	4		1
Sweden	6	6	4	6	7	2	2	–		7
**CONMEBOL**
Nation	96	00	04	08	12	16	20	24	28	Years
Argentina	–	–	–	11	–	–	–	–		1
Brazil	4	4	2	2	6	**4**	6	2	Q	9
Chile	–	–	–	–	–	–	11	–	–	1
Colombia	–	–	–	–	11	11	–	8	Q	4
**CONCACAF**
Nation	96	00	04	08	12	16	20	24	28	Years
Canada	–	–	–	8	3	3	1	7		5
Mexico	–	–	8	–	–	–	–	–		1
United States	**1**	2	1	1	1	5	3	1	**Q**	9
**CAF**
Nation	96	00	04	08	12	16	20	24	28	Years
Cameroon	–	–	–	–	12	–	–	–		1
Nigeria	–	8	6	11	–	–	–	11		4
South Africa	–	–	–	–	10	10	–	–		2
Zambia	–	–	–	–	–	–	9	12		2
Zimbabwe	–	–	–	–	–	12	–	–		1
**AFC**
Nation	96	00	04	08	12	16	20	24	28	Years
Australia	OFC (q. 2 t.)			–	–	7	4	9		3
China	2	5	9	**5**	–	8	10	–		6
Japan	7	–	7	4	2	–	**8**	5		6
North Korea	–	–	–	9	9	–	–	–		2
**OFC**
Nation	96	00	04	08	12	16	20	24	28	Years
Australia	–	**7**	5	AFC (qualified 3 times)						2
New Zealand	–	–	–	10	8	9	12	10		5
**Total nations**	**8**	**8**	**10**	**12**	**12**	**12**	**12**	**12**	**16**	

=== Results ===
Keys

- a.e.t. – after extra time
- a.s.d.e.t. – after sudden death extra time

Ed.	Year	Hosts	Gold medal match			Bronze medal match			Num. teams
Ed.	Year	Hosts	(gold) Gold medalists	Score	(silver) Silver medalists	(bronze) Bronze medalists	Score	Fourth place	Num. teams
1	1996	Atlanta	United States	2–1	China	Norway	2–0	Brazil	8
2	2000	Sydney	Norway	3–2 (a.s.d.e.t.)	United States	Germany	2–0	Brazil	8
3	2004	Athens	United States	2–1 (a.e.t.)	Brazil	Germany	1–0	Sweden	10
4	2008	Beijing	United States	1–0 (a.e.t.)	Brazil	Germany	2–0	Japan	12
5	2012	London	United States	2–1	Japan	Canada	1–0	France	12
6	2016	Rio de Janeiro	Germany	2–1	Sweden	Canada	2–1	Brazil	12
7	2020	Tokyo	Canada	1–1 (a.e.t.) (3–2 p)	Sweden	United States	4–3	Australia	12
8	2024	Paris	United States	1–0	Brazil	Germany	1–0	Spain	12
9	2028	Los Angeles							16

=== Performances by countries ===
Below are the ten nations that have reached at least the semi-finals in the Summer Olympics finals.

Team	Gold medals	Silver medals	Bronze medals	Fourth place	Medals
United States	**5** (1996, 2004, 2008, 2012, 2024)	1 (2000)	1 (2020)		**7**
Germany	**1** (2016)		**4** (2000, 2004, 2008, 2024)		5
Canada	**1** (2020)		2 (2012, 2016)		3
Norway	**1** (2000)		1 (1996)		2
Brazil		**3** (2004, 2008, 2024)		**3** (1996, 2000, 2016)	3
Sweden		2 (2016, 2020)		1 (2004)	2
Japan		1 (2012)		1 (2008)	1
China		1 (1996)			1
France				1 (2012)	0
Australia				1 (2020)	0
Spain				1 (2024)	0

== Overall medal table ==
- Total medals won (men's and women's) including 1900 and 1904
- Bronze medals shared in 1972 tournament

As of gold medal match of 2024 Olympics women's tournament

Rank	Nation	Gold	Silver	Bronze	Total
1	United States	5	2	2	9
2	Hungary	3	1	1	5
3	Great Britain	3	0	0	3
4	Brazil	2	6	2	10
5	Spain	2	3	0	5
6	Argentina	2	2	0	4
7	Soviet Union	2	0	3	5
8	Canada	2	0	2	4
9	Uruguay	2	0	0	2
10	Yugoslavia	1	3	1	5
11	Sweden	1	2	2	5
12	France	1	2	0	3
12	Poland	1	2	0	3
14	Germany	1	1	4	6
15	East Germany	1	1	1	3
15	Nigeria	1	1	1	3
17	Czechoslovakia	1	1	0	2
18	Italy	1	0	2	3
18	Norway	1	0	2	3
20	Belgium	1	0	1	2
20	Mexico	1	0	1	2
22	Cameroon	1	0	0	1
23	Denmark	0	3	1	4
24	Bulgaria	0	1	1	2
24	Japan	0	1	1	2
26	Austria	0	1	0	1
26	China	0	1	0	1
26	Paraguay	0	1	0	1
26	Switzerland	0	1	0	1
30	Netherlands	0	0	3	3
31	Chile	0	0	1	1
31	Ghana	0	0	1	1
31	Morocco	0	0	1	1
31	South Korea	0	0	1	1
31	United Team of Germany	0	0	1	1
31	West Germany	0	0	1	1
Totals (36 entries)		36	36	37	109

== See also ==
- Football at the Youth Olympic Games

== Works cited ==
- Goldblatt, David (2 January 2008). The Ball Is Round: A Global History of Football. New York: Riverhead Books. ISBN 978-0-14-101582-8.
