= Viktor Kassai =

Hungarian football referee

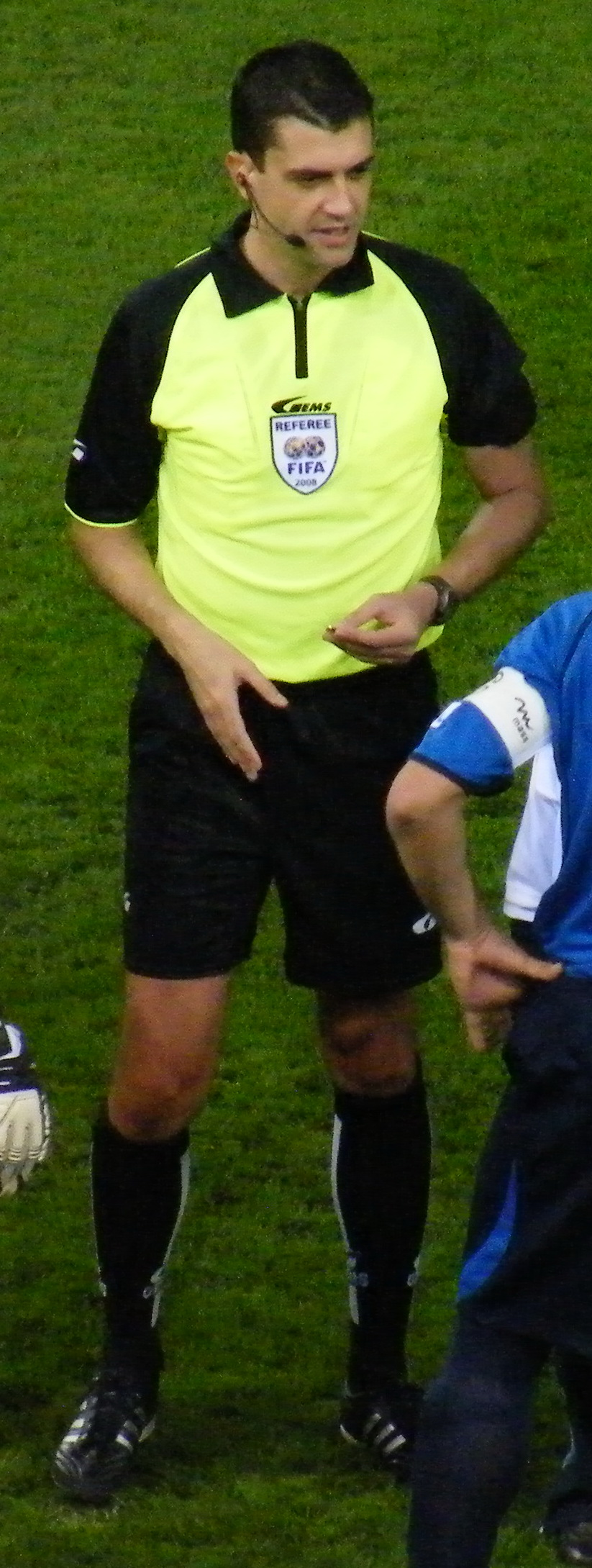
- Kassai in 2008
- Born: 10 September 1975 (age 51); Tatabánya, Hungary

Domestic
Years	League	
1996–2019	NB I	

International
Years	League	Role
2003–2019	FIFA listed	Referee

Viktor Kassai (Kassai Viktor, Hungarian pronunciation: [ˈkɒʃːɒi ˈviktor]; born 10 September 1975) is a Hungarian football official and a former referee who is the current head of refereeing department of the Bulgarian Football Union. He participated in the 2010 FIFA World Cup and refereed the 2011 UEFA Champions League Final. He has been a full international referee for FIFA since 2003. He retired as a referee on 30 December 2019.

== Career ==
=== Early international career ===
2007 FIFA U-20 World Cup in Canada, where he refereed the group stage match between Brazil and South Korea, as well as the Argentina–North Korea match.

Kassai refereed in UEFA Euro 2008 as the fourth official in several matches. During 2008, he also officiated in the 2008 Olympic Games in Beijing, including in the final, in which Argentina defeated Nigeria 1–0.

=== 2010 World Cup ===
Kassai was preselected as a referee for the 2010 FIFA World Cup. He refereed in the first leg of the AFC 5th vs OFC winner qualifier between Bahrain and New Zealand.

On 5 July, it was announced that he would be in charge for the Germany vs Spain semifinal. It was his fourth match in the World Cup. This is the highest prestige match a Hungarian referee has been in charge of since Sándor Puhl's 1994 FIFA World Cup Final.

His first appearance in the 2010 FIFA World Cup was a group stage match between Brazil and North Korea on 15 June 2010, which Brazil won 2–1. He refereed two matches in the group stage. The United States vs Ghana match finished after extra time, becoming the first match in the World Cup to happen so. It was the first time that either Ghana or the United States played in a World Cup match ending in extra time.

=== 2011 Champions League Final ===
Kassai was the head of an all-Hungarian crew in the 2011 UEFA Champions League Final at Wembley Stadium in London, where he cautioned two players apiece on both the Barcelona (Daniel Alves and Victor Valdés) and Manchester United (Antonio Valencia and Michael Carrick) sides; Barcelona won the match 3–1.

=== Euro 2012 ===
At the UEFA Euro 2012, Kassai officiated the group matches Spain vs Italy and England vs Ukraine. This was the first international tournament where two additional assistant referees were introduced on the goal-lines. During the England and Ukraine game a Ukrainian strike was cleared by English defender John Terry, but TV re-plays showed that the ball had crossed the line. This led to a debate on the effectiveness of the inclusion of the two additional officials and the need for goal-line technology. FIFA president Sepp Blatter said, "goal-line technology was a necessity" following the England vs Ukraine match.

=== 2016 FIFA Club World Cup ===
On 14 December 2016, Kassai became the first referee to award a penalty after viewing a video replay in a Club World Cup match, doing so in the 2016 FIFA Club World Cup semi finals between Atlético Nacional and Kashima Antlers.

=== Post-refereeing career ===
On 9 January 2020 he was appointed the head of refereeing department of the Russian Football Union. He resigned from the position on 13 September 2021.

On 26 January 2022 Kassai was appointed the head of refereeing department of the Bulgarian Football Union. He will be in this position until the end of June 2023.

=== Controversies ===
Kassai was involved in two different incidents, in the UEFA Euro 2012 and the 2016–17 UEFA Champions League.

On 18 April 2017, he refereed the 2016–17 UEFA Champions League quarter-finals second-leg between Real Madrid and FC Bayern Munich. He was heavily criticized for poor refereeing decisions, as Real Madrid and Bayern Munich had scored two respectively one goal in which they were offside. He was also criticized for not sending off sending off Bayern player Arturo Vidal in the 48th minute and also Madrid player Casemiro in the 81th minute. Madrid initially won 4–2 after extra time, and advanced to the semi-finals.

On 7 November 2018, Kassai refereed the 2018–19 UEFA Champions League group stage fixture between Manchester City and Shakhtar Donetsk. During the game he awarded the home side a penalty when Raheem Sterling unintentionally tripped himself in the box, while there was clearly no contact between him and Shakhtar defenders at all. The penalty was converted in by Gabriel Jesus and Manchester City won 6–0.

== Major matches refereed ==
Date	Match	Tournament	Venue	Result	Ref
23 August 2008	Nigeria vs. Argentina	2008 FIFA Men's Olympic Football Tournament final	National Stadium, Beijing	0–1	
28 May 2011	Barcelona vs. Manchester United	2011 UEFA Champions League final	Wembley Stadium, London	3–1	

== Honours ==
- IFFHS World's Best Referee: 2011

Sporting positions (Hungary) Viktor Kassai
Preceded by 2004 (Greece) Kyros Vassaras	FIFA Men's Olympic Football Tournament Final referee 2008	Succeeded by 2012 (United Kingdom) Mark Clattenburg
Preceded by 2010 (England) Howard Webb	UEFA Champions League Final referee 2011	Succeeded by 2012 (Portugal) Pedro Proença
