= Chibuzor Okonkwo =

Nigerian footballer (born 1988)

Personal information
- Full name: Chibuzor Augustine Okonkwo
- Date of birth: 16 December 1988 (age 37)
- Place of birth: Jos, Nigeria
- Height: 1.77 m (5 ft 10 in)
- Position: Defender

Team information
- Current team: Kwara United
- Number: 22

Senior career*
Years	Team	Apps	(Gls)
2004–2007	Ifeanyi Ubah F.C.		
2007–2010	Bayelsa United		
2010–2012	Heartland		
2012	Enyimba International F.C.		
2013	Enugu Rangers		(1)
2013–2014	Asswehly S.C.		
2015–2017	Ifeanyi Ubah F.C.		
2017	El-Kanemi Warriors F.C.		
2022-2022	ITTIHAD FC SHARJAH		

International career^{‡}
2008	Nigeria U-23	5	(1)
2010–	Nigeria	9	(0)
Medal record
Representing Nigeria
Men's Football
Silver medal – second place	2008 Beijing	Team competition
- * Club domestic league appearances and goals ‡ National team caps and goals as of 21 June 2013

Chibuzor Augustine Okonkwo (born 16 December 1988) is a Nigerian footballer who currently plays as a full-back for Kwara United F.C. Although he is naturally right-footed, he can play on either side of the pitch.

== Career ==
In January 2007, Okonkwo moved from Gabros International (now Ifeanyi Ubah F.C.) to Bayelsa United F.C., where he won the 2008–09 League MVP award after helping Bayelsa win their first ever league title. On 6 October 2009, Okonkwo signed for Heartland F.C. The deal fell through however and he returned to Bayelsa. On 23 August 2010, he was to move to Russian Premier side FC Rostov. But the deal was eventually quashed due to disagreement over wages. He returned home to sign for Heartland, where his mentor Samson Siasia was in charge. In December 2011, it was reported that he attended trial at Aston Villa Football Club. He trialed with Reading F.C. in January 2012, appearing in a reserve team fixture against Watford.

At the end of February 2012, Okonkwo completed a medical and was close to agreeing terms with Vålerenga Fotball, but as of the end of April 2012 was still contracted to Heartland. He signed on 22 November 2012 a two-year deal with Enyimba International F.C., but the deal fell through and he signed with rivals Rangers in February 2013. In August 2013, he signed a short-term deal with Asswehly in Libya. He rejoined FC Ifeanyi Ubah ahead of the 2015 Nigerian season and helped the promoted club win the Nigeria National League Super Four. He moved to El-Kanemi Warriors F.C. in 2017 and transferred to Kwara United in 2018.

== International career ==
Was member of Nigeria U-23 team for 2008 Summer Olympics in Beijing. He was added to the Super Eagles' list for friendlies in April 2009, the first Nigeria-based player to earn a callup since Shaibu Amodu became coach, but was unable to travel due to visa problems.

He finally made his Nigeria debut on 3 March 2010, starting at right back in the 5–2 home win over Congo DR.
