= Vladimír Weiss (footballer, born 1939) =

Czechoslovak footballer and coach

Personal information
- Date of birth: 21 September 1939
- Place of birth: Vrútky, Slovak Republic
- Date of death: 23 April 2018 (aged 78)
- Height: 1.78 m (5 ft 10 in)
- Position: Centre back

Youth career
- Lokomotíva Vrútky

Senior career*
Years	Team	Apps	(Gls)
1958–1969	ČH/Inter Bratislava	236	(6)
- Baník Prievidza
- Trnávka

International career
1960–1964	Czechoslovakia Olympic	17	(1)
1964–1965	Czechoslovakia	3	(0)

Managerial career
- Trnávka
- Rapid Bratislava
- Slovenský Grob
- Pezinok
- Limbach
Medal record
Men's football
Representing Czechoslovakia
Olympic Games
Silver medal – second place	1964 Tokyo	Team competition
- * Club domestic league appearances and goals

Vladimír Weiss (21 September 1939 – 23 April 2018) was a Czechoslovak football defender. As a player he won the Czechoslovak First League with ČH Bratislava in 1959, as well as a silver Olympic medal with Czechoslovakia at the 1964 Summer Olympics football competition. After his playing career he spent time as a coach.

== Biography ==
Weiss was born in Vrútky on 21 September 1939 and settled in Bratislava in 1958. Between 1958 and 1969, Weiss played in the Czechoslovak First League for ČH/Slovnaft/Inter Bratislava, making a total of 236 league appearances and scoring 6 goals. He won the national title with Bratislava in the 1958–59 season. He subsequently played for Baník Prievidza and Trnávka at the end of his career.

== International career ==
Weiss represented Czechoslovakia national football team between 1964 and 1965, making three appearances. At Olympic level he played for his country 17 times, scoring once, between 1960 and 1964, culminating in being part of the silver medal winning team for Czechoslovakia at the 1964 Summer Olympics. Among his three full caps, Weiss played in a 0–1 1966 FIFA World Cup qualification defeat against Portugal at Bratislava's Tehelné pole stadium.

== Coaching career ==
After the end of his playing career, Weiss moved into coaching, leading clubs including Trnávka, Rapid Bratislava, Slovenský Grob, Pezinok and Limbach, all close to where he was living.

== Personal life ==
Weiss had two children, including Vladimír, who has been head coach of numerous football teams, including Slovakia and Slovan Bratislava. His grandson, named Vladimír Weiss as well, plays for Slovan Bratislava, having also appeared in the Premier League, La Liga and Serie A.

Weiss lived in Limbach after playing football, but was suffering from health problems for a long time. He died on 23 April 2018 at the age of 78.

== Honours ==
- ČH Bratislava: Czechoslovak First League (1958–59)
- 1964 Summer Olympics: Silver medal
