= Olubayo Adefemi =

Nigerian footballer (1985–2011)

Personal information
- Full name: Olubayo Adefemi
- Date of birth: 13 August 1985
- Place of birth: Lagos, Nigeria
- Date of death: 18 April 2011 (aged 25)
- Place of death: Kavala, Greece
- Height: 1.84 m (6 ft 0 in)
- Position: Defender

Youth career
- –2000: Bendel Insurance

Senior career*
Years	Team	Apps	(Gls)
2001–2002	Bendel Insurance		
2002–2004	Delta Force		
2004–2005	Hapoel Jerusalem	23	(0)
2005–2006	Hapoel Tel Aviv	10	(0)
2006–2007	Hakoah Ramat Gan	0	(0)
2007–2008	Hapoel Bnei Lod	30	(2)
2008	Rapid București	9	(0)
2009	SC Rheindorf Altach	0	(0)
2009–2010	Boulogne	13	(1)
2010–2011	Skoda Xanthi	24	(2)

International career
2005	Nigeria U20	5	(1)
2008	Nigeria U23	5	(1)
2009–2011	Nigeria	5	(0)
Medal record
Representing Nigeria
Men's football
Silver medal – second place	2008 Beijing	Team competition
- * Club domestic league appearances and goals

Olubayo Adefemi (13 August 1985 – 18 April 2011) was a Nigerian professional footballer who last played for Skoda Xanthi. He also played for the Nigeria national football team

== International career ==
Adefemi represented his country at the 2008 Olympic Games, playing all the games and scoring a goal in a semifinal match against Belgium. He was a member of the Nigerian Under 20 team that came second behind a Lionel Messi-led Argentina at the 2005 FIFA World Youth Championship in the Netherlands. Adefemi played 5 out of Nigeria's six matches, scoring 1 goal against Morocco in the semi-final.

Adefemi made his senior national team debut against Ireland on 29 May 2009, assisting for Michael Eneramo's goal in a 1-1 draw at Craven Cottage. He earned his second cap in a win over France.

== Statistics ==
Club performance			League		Cup		League Cup		Continental		Total	
Season	Club	League	Apps	Goals	Apps	Goals	Apps	Goals	Apps	Goals	Apps	Goals
Israel			League		Israel State Cup		Toto Cup		Europe		Total	
2006–07	Hakoah Ramat Gan	Liga Al	0	0	0	0	1	0	0	0	1	0
2007–08	Hapoel Bnei Lod	Liga Leumit	31	2	1	0	8	1	0	0	41	3
Career total			0	0	0	0	0	0	0	0	0	3

== Death ==
On 18 April 2011 Olubayo died in a car crash while driving on the A2 motorway (Egnatia Odos), near the city of Kavala, Greece. He was on his way to Nigeria in order to finalise details of his wedding.

== Honours ==
- Vice World Champion 2005 U-20
- Israeli F.A cup winner with Hapoel Tel Aviv 2006
- Silver Medal 2008 Olympics
