= Mohamed Lamari (footballer) =

Moroccan footballer

Personal information
- Date of birth: 1937 (age 88–89)

Senior career*
Years	Team	Apps	(Gls)
1955–1958	Youssoufia Berrechid		
1958–1968	FAR Rabat		

International career
1960–1968	Morocco	30	(5)

Managerial career
- 1970–1971: Union Touarga
- barid Rabat: 1971–1972
- Mouloudia Oujda: 1972–1976
- Morocco: 1978–1979
- 1979–1982: Union Touarga
- 1982–1983: Morocco
- 1982–1983: Union Touarga
- 1985–1986: raja de Casablanca
- 1986–1987: raja de Casablanca
- 1986–1987: KACM Marrakech
- 1995–1996: KACM Marrakech
- 1996–1998: raja de Casablanca
- * Club domestic league appearances and goals

Mohamed Lamari (born 1937) is a Moroccan footballer. He competed in the men's tournament at the 1964 Summer Olympics.

== Honors ==
FAR Rabat(6) :

- Moroccan League (5): 1961, 1962, 1963, 1964, 1968
- Moroccan Throne Cup: 1959

=== En sélection ===
Morocco

- Jeux panarabes (1) :
  - Médaille d'or : 1961.

=== Manager ===
Mouloudia Oujda (1) :

- Moroccan League (1): 1975

uts touarga (1) :

- Botola Pro D2
  - Winners (1): 1979–80,

=== manager adjoint ===
Raja Casablanca (3):

- Moroccan League (2): 1997, 1998

CAF Champions league (1): 1997
