= Ahmed Laghrissi =

Moroccan footballer (1937–2022)

Personal information
- Full name: Haj Ahmed Laghrissi Labied
- Date of birth: 1937
- Place of birth: Fez, French protectorate in Morocco
- Date of death: 23 June 2022 (aged 84–85)
- Place of death: Mohammedia, Morocco
- Height: 1.70 m (5 ft 7 in)
- Position: Goalkeeper

Senior career*
Years	Team	Apps	(Gls)
1956–1957	US Marocaine		
1957–1968	MAS Fez		

International career
1950s–1966	Morocco	5+	(0)
- * Club domestic league appearances and goals

Haj Ahmed Laghrissi Labied (Arabic: أحمد الغريسي, 1937 – 23 June 2022) was a Moroccan footballer who played as a goalkeeper. He was considered one of the best goalkeepers in the history of MAS Fez.

== Career ==
Laghrissi played for MAS Fez until 1968, and won a league title with them in the 1964–65 season. Following his retirement from football, he continued to work as a youth coach at MAS Fez.

Laghrissi played for the Morocco national team during the 1950s and 1960s, and played in the 1962 FIFA World Cup qualification play-offs against Spain. He was also part of the Morocco squad at the 1964 Summer Olympics in Japan, but didn't play in any matches.

== Personal life and death ==
Later in life, he owned a Vivo Energy gas station in Fez.

He died on 23 June 2022, after contracting COVID-19.
