= Football at the 2008 Summer Olympics – Men's tournament =

2008 Men's Olympic Football Tournament

Tournament details
- Host country: China
- Dates: 7–23 August
- Teams: 16 (from 6 confederations)
- Venues: 6 (in 5 host cities)

Final positions
- Champions: Argentina (2nd title)
- Runners-up: Nigeria
- Third place: Brazil
- Fourth place: Belgium

Tournament statistics
- Matches played: 32
- Goals scored: 75 (2.34 per match)
- Attendance: 1,404,254 (43,883 per match)
- Top scorer(s): (Italy) Giuseppe Rossi (4 goals)

The men's football tournament at the 2008 Summer Olympics was held in Beijing and four other cities in the People's Republic of China from 7 to 23 August. Associations affiliated with FIFA were invited to enter their men's under-23 teams in regional qualifying competitions, from which 15 teams, plus the host nation, reached the final tournament. Men's teams were allowed to augment their squads with up to three players over the age of 23.

For these Games, the men competed in a 16-team tournament. Preliminary matches commenced on 7 August, the day before the Games' opening ceremony. The teams were grouped into four pools of four teams each for a round-robin preliminary round. The top two teams in each pool advanced to an eight-team single-elimination bracket.

The tournament was won by Argentina, who beat Nigeria 1–0 in the final, as part of a record streak of 12 consecutive wins in football competitions at the Summer Olympics (six wins in 2004, six wins in 2008).

Despite the absence of an official best player award, the FIFA website highlighted Lionel Messi's campaign by stating that he "posed defenders more problems than anyone else in the tournament". Juan Román Riquelme and Javier Mascherano also received special mentions.

== Qualification ==
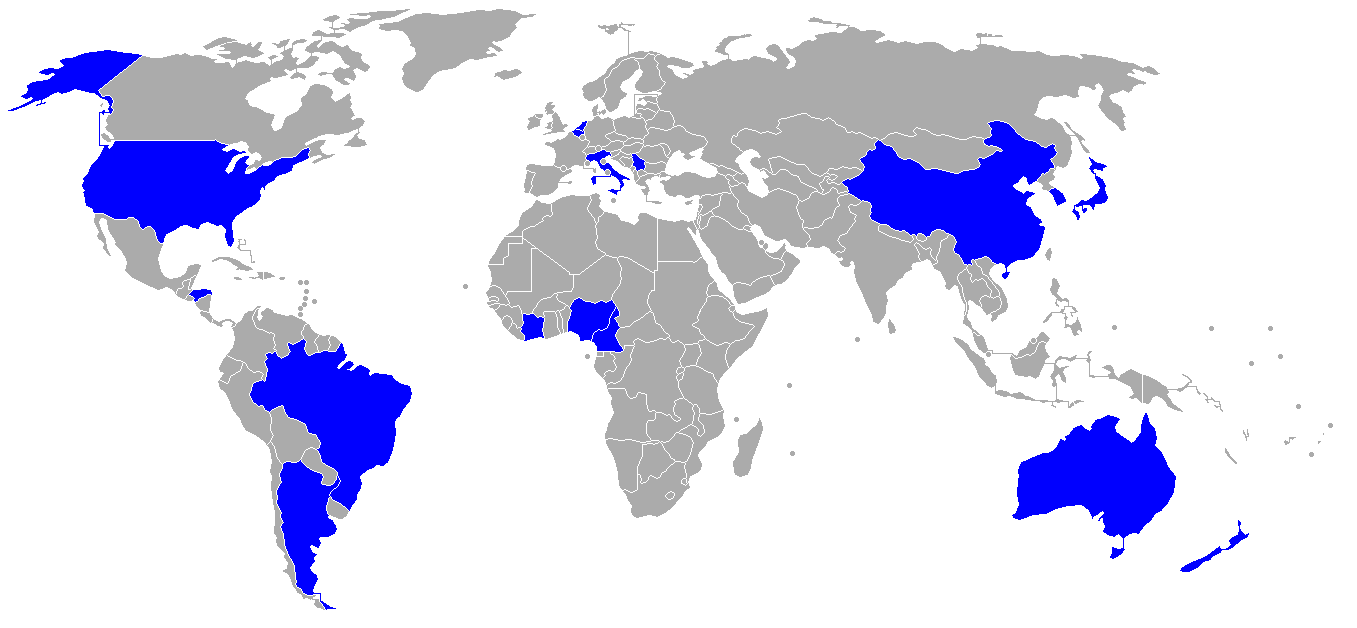
Countries of men's tournament

A National Olympic Committee may enter one men's team in football competitions.

Means of qualification	Date	Venue	Berths	Qualified
Host nation			1	China
AFC Preliminary Competition	February – November 2007	–	3	Australia; Japan; South Korea
CAF Preliminary Competition	September 2006 – March 2008	–	3	Cameroon; Ivory Coast; Nigeria
CONCACAF Preliminary Competition	August 2007 – March 2008	United States	2	Honduras; United States
2007 South American Youth Championship	7–28 January 2007	Paraguay	2	Brazil; Argentina
OFC Preliminary Competition	1–9 March 2008	Fiji	1	New Zealand
2007 UEFA U-21 Championship	10–23 June 2007	Netherlands	4	Netherlands; Serbia; Belgium; Italy
Total			16	

== Venues ==
Six venues were used during the tournament, four of them outside of Beijing at cities around China. Beijing National Stadium hosted the final.

Beijing		Shanghai	Location of the host cities of the men's football tournament of the 2008 Summer Olympics.
Chaoyang		Xuhui	Location of the host cities of the men's football tournament of the 2008 Summer Olympics.
Beijing National Stadium	Workers' Stadium	Shanghai Stadium	Location of the host cities of the men's football tournament of the 2008 Summer Olympics.
Capacity: 91,000	Capacity: 70,161	Capacity: 80,000	Location of the host cities of the men's football tournament of the 2008 Summer Olympics.
Shenyang	Tianjin	Qinhuangdao	Location of the host cities of the men's football tournament of the 2008 Summer Olympics.
Hunnan	Nankai	Haigang	Location of the host cities of the men's football tournament of the 2008 Summer Olympics.
Shenyang Olympic Stadium	Tianjin Olympic Centre Stadium	Qinhuangdao Olympic Sports Centre Stadium	Location of the host cities of the men's football tournament of the 2008 Summer Olympics.
Capacity: 60,000	Capacity: 60,000	Capacity: 33,000	Location of the host cities of the men's football tournament of the 2008 Summer Olympics.

== Squads ==
For the men's tournament, each nation submitted a squad of 18 players, 15 of whom had to be born on or after 1 January 1985, and three of whom could be overage players, by 23 July 2008. A minimum of two goalkeepers (plus one optional alternate goalkeeper) had to be included in the squad.

== Match officials ==
On 22 April 2008, FIFA released the list of match referees that will officiate at the Olympics.

Confederation	Referee	Assistants
AFC	Khalil Al Ghamdi (Saudi Arabia)	Mohammed Al Ghamdi (Saudi Arabia); Hamdi Al Kadrie (Syria)
AFC	Abdullah Al Hilali (Oman)	Khaled Al Allan (Bahrain); Saleh Al Marzouqi (United Arab Emirates)
AFC	Masoud Moradi (Iran)	Hassan Kamranifar (Iran); Luay Subhi Adib (Iraq)
CAF	Jerome Damon (South Africa)	Enock Molefe (South Africa); Célestin Ntagungira (Rwanda)
CAF	Badara Diatta (Senegal)	Bechir Hassani (Tunisia); Evarist Menkouande (Cameroon)
CONCACAF	Roberto Moreno (Panama)	Daniel Williamson (Panama); Hairo Fuentes (Panama)
CONCACAF	Jair Marrufo (United States)	Kermit Quisenberry (United States); Ricardo Morgan (Jamaica)
CONMEBOL	Héctor Baldassi (Argentina)	Ricardo Casas (Argentina); Hernán Maidana (Argentina)
CONMEBOL	Pablo Pozo (Chile)	Patricio Basualto (Chile); Julio Díaz (Chile)
CONMEBOL	Martín Vázquez (Uruguay)	Mauricio Espinosa (Uruguay); Miguel Nievas (Uruguay)
OFC	Michael Hester (New Zealand)	Tevita Makasini (Tonga); Michael Joseph (Vanuatu)
UEFA	Thomas Einwaller (Austria)	Roland Heim (Austria); Norbert Schwab (Austria)
UEFA	Viktor Kassai (Hungary)	Gábor Erős (Hungary); Tibor Vámos (Hungary)
UEFA	Stéphane Lannoy (France)	Eric Dansault (France); Frédéric Cano (France)
UEFA	Damir Skomina (Slovenia)	Primož Arhar (Slovenia); Marco Stancin (Slovenia)
UEFA	Wolfgang Stark (Germany)	Jan-Hendrik Salver (Germany); Volker Wezel (Germany)

All times are China Standard Time (UTC+8).

== Seeding ==
The draw for the tournament took place on 20 April 2008. Argentina, the Netherlands, China and Cameroon were seeded for the draw and placed into groups A–D, respectively. The remaining teams were drawn from four pots with teams from the same region kept apart.

Pot 1: Asia	Pot 2: Africa and Oceania	Pot 3: Europe	Pot 4: Americas
China (assigned to C1); Australia; Japan; South Korea	Cameroon (assigned to Group D); Ivory Coast; Nigeria; New Zealand	Netherlands (assigned to Group B); Belgium; Italy; Serbia	Argentina (assigned to Group A); Brazil; Honduras; United States

== Group stage ==
Group winners and runners-up advanced to the quarter-finals.

=== Group A ===
Pos	Team	Pld	W	D	L	GF	GA	GD	Pts	Qualification
1	Argentina	3	3	0	0	5	1	+4	9	Qualified for the quarterfinals
2	Ivory Coast	3	2	0	1	6	4	+2	6	Qualified for the quarterfinals
3	Australia	3	0	1	2	1	3	−2	1	
4	Serbia	3	0	1	2	3	7	−4	1	

7 August 2008
17:00

Australia	1–1	Serbia
Zadkovich 69'	Report	Rajković 78'

Shanghai Stadium, Shanghai
Attendance: 36,184
Referee: Jerome Damon (South Africa)
7 August 2008
19:45

Ivory Coast	1–2	Argentina
Cissé 53'	Report	Messi 43'; Acosta 86'

Shanghai Stadium, Shanghai
Attendance: 43,266
Referee: Wolfgang Stark (Germany)

10 August 2008
17:00

Argentina	1–0	Australia
Lavezzi 76'	Report

Shanghai Stadium, Shanghai
Attendance: 38,182
Referee: Viktor Kassai (Hungary)
10 August 2008
19:45

Serbia	2–4	Ivory Coast
Mrdaković 16'; Rakić 90'	Report	Cissé 3'; Rajković 24' (o.g.); Kalou 70'; Gervinho 90+3'

Shanghai Stadium, Shanghai
Attendance: 38,320
Referee: Roberto Moreno (Panama)

13 August 2008
19:45

Ivory Coast	1–0	Australia
Kalou 81'	Report

Tianjin Olympic Center Stadium, Tianjin
Attendance: 50,437
Referee: Jair Marrufo (United States)
13 August 2008
19:45

Argentina	2–0	Serbia
Lavezzi 13' (pen.); Buonanotte 84'	Report

Beijing Workers' Stadium, Beijing
Attendance: 53,668
Referee: Abdullah Al Hilali (Oman)

=== Group B ===
Pos	Team	Pld	W	D	L	GF	GA	GD	Pts	Qualification
1	Nigeria	3	2	1	0	4	2	+2	7	Qualified for the quarterfinals
2	Netherlands	3	1	2	0	3	2	+1	5	Qualified for the quarterfinals
3	United States	3	1	1	1	4	4	0	4	
4	Japan	3	0	0	3	1	4	−3	0	

7 August 2008
17:00

Japan	0–1	United States
	Report	Holden 47'

Tianjin Olympic Center Stadium, Tianjin
Attendance: 57,102
Referee: Badara Diatta (Senegal)
7 August 2008
19:45

Netherlands	0–0	Nigeria
	Report

Tianjin Olympic Center Stadium, Tianjin
Attendance: 52,390
Referee: Pablo Pozo (Chile)

10 August 2008
17:00

Nigeria	2–1	Japan
Obinna 58'; Anichebe 74'	Report	Toyoda 79'

Tianjin Olympic Center Stadium, Tianjin
Attendance: 42,592
Referee: Masoud Moradi (Iran)
10 August 2008
19:45

United States	2–2	Netherlands
Kljestan 64'; Altidore 72'	Report	Babel 16'; Sibon 90+3'

Tianjin Olympic Center Stadium, Tianjin
Attendance: 45,016
Referee: Michael Hester (New Zealand)

13 August 2008
17:00

Netherlands	1–0	Japan
Sibon 73' (pen.)	Report

Shenyang Olympic Stadium, Shenyang
Attendance: 38,790
Referee: Héctor Baldassi (Argentina)
13 August 2008
17:00

Nigeria	2–1	United States
Isaac 39'; Obinna 79'	Report	Kljestan 88' (pen.)

Beijing Workers' Stadium, Beijing
Attendance: 48,096
Referee: Wolfgang Stark (Germany)

=== Group C ===
Pos	Team	Pld	W	D	L	GF	GA	GD	Pts	Qualification
1	Brazil	3	3	0	0	9	0	+9	9	Qualified for the quarterfinals
2	Belgium	3	2	0	1	3	1	+2	6	Qualified for the quarterfinals
3	China (H)	3	0	1	2	1	6	−5	1	
4	New Zealand	3	0	1	2	1	7	−6	1	

(H) Hosts
7 August 2008
17:00

Brazil	1–0	Belgium
Hernanes 79'	Report

Shenyang Olympic Stadium, Shenyang
Attendance: 39,661
Referee: Khalil Al Ghamdi (Saudi Arabia)
7 August 2008
19:45

China	1–1	New Zealand
Dong Fangzhuo 88'	Report	Brockie 53'

Shenyang Olympic Stadium, Shenyang
Attendance: 41,407
Referee: Martín Vázquez (Uruguay)

10 August 2008
17:00

New Zealand	0–5	Brazil
	Report	Anderson 3'; Pato 33'; Ronaldinho 55', 61' (pen.); Sóbis 90+3'

Shenyang Olympic Stadium, Shenyang
Attendance: 44,951
Referee: Stéphane Lannoy (France)
10 August 2008
19:45

Belgium	2–0	China
Dembélé 8'; Mirallas 80'	Report

Shenyang Olympic Stadium, Shenyang
Attendance: 45,756
Referee: Héctor Baldassi (Argentina)

13 August 2008
19:45

China	0–3	Brazil
	Report	Diego 18'; Thiago Neves 69', 73'

Qinhuangdao Olympic Sports Center Stadium, Qinhuangdao
Attendance: 38,790
Referee: Jerome Damon (South Africa)
13 August 2008
19:45

New Zealand	0–1	Belgium
	Report	Haroun 35'

Shanghai Stadium, Shanghai
Attendance: 45,202
Referee: Pablo Pozo (Chile)

=== Group D ===
Pos	Team	Pld	W	D	L	GF	GA	GD	Pts	Qualification
1	Italy	3	2	1	0	6	0	+6	7	Qualified for the quarterfinals
2	Cameroon	3	1	2	0	2	1	+1	5	Qualified for the quarterfinals
3	South Korea	3	1	1	1	2	4	−2	4	
4	Honduras	3	0	0	3	0	5	−5	0	

7 August 2008
17:00

Honduras	0–3	Italy
	Report	Giovinco 41'; Rossi 45' (pen.); Acquafresca 52' (pen.)

Qinhuangdao Olympic Sports Center Stadium, Qinhuangdao
Attendance: 21,680
Referee: Damir Skomina (Slovenia)
7 August 2008
19:45

South Korea	1–1	Cameroon
Park Chu-young 68'	Report	Mandjeck 81'

Qinhuangdao Olympic Sports Center Stadium, Qinhuangdao
Attendance: 21,943
Referee: Jair Marrufo (United States)

10 August 2008
17:00

Cameroon	1–0	Honduras
Mbia 74'	Report

Qinhuangdao Olympic Sports Center Stadium, Qinhuangdao
Attendance: 28,657
Referee: Abdullah Al Hilali (Oman)
10 August 2008
19:45

Italy	3–0	South Korea
Rossi 15'; Rocchi 32'; Montolivo 90'	Report

Qinhuangdao Olympic Sports Center Stadium, Qinhuangdao
Attendance: 29,455
Referee: Thomas Einwaller (Austria)

13 August 2008
17:00

South Korea	1–0	Honduras
Kim Dong-jin 23'	Report

Shanghai Stadium, Shanghai
Attendance: 34,160
Referee: Michael Hester (New Zealand)
13 August 2008
17:00

Cameroon	0–0	Italy
	Report

Tianjin Olympic Center Stadium, Tianjin
Attendance: 47,307
Referee: Martín Vázquez (Uruguay)

== Knockout stage ==
Quarter-finals
B1	Nigeria	2
A2	Ivory Coast	0
D1	Italy	2
C2	Belgium	3
A1	Argentina (a.e.t.)	2
B2	Netherlands	1
C1	Brazil (a.e.t.)	2
D2	Cameroon	0

Semi-finals
B1	Nigeria	4
C2	Belgium	1
A1	Argentina	3
C1	Brazil	0

Gold medal match
B1	Nigeria	0
A1	Argentina	1
Bronze medal match
C2	Belgium	0
C1	Brazil	3

=== Quarter-finals ===
16 August 2008
18:00

Brazil	2–0 (a.e.t.)	Cameroon
Sóbis 101'; Marcelo 105'	Report

Shenyang Olympic Stadium, Shenyang
Attendance: 41,043
Referee: Damir Skomina (Slovenia)

16 August 2008
18:00

Italy	2–3	Belgium
Rossi 18' (pen.), 74' (pen.)	Report	Dembélé 23', 79'; Mirallas 45+2'

Beijing Workers' Stadium, Beijing
Attendance: 50,802
Referee: Héctor Baldassi (Argentina)

16 August 2008
21:00

Argentina	2–1 (a.e.t.)	Netherlands
Messi 14'; Di María 105'	Report	Bakkal 36'

Shanghai Stadium, Shanghai
Attendance: 51,366
Referee: Jair Marrufo (United States)

16 August 2008
21:00

Nigeria	2–0	Ivory Coast
Odemwingie 44'; Obinna 82' (pen.)	Report

Qinhuangdao Olympic Sports Center Stadium, Qinhuangdao
Attendance: 28,944
Referee: Masoud Moradi (Iran)

=== Semi-finals ===
19 August 2008
18:00

Nigeria	4–1	Belgium
Adefemi 17'; Obasi 59', 72'; Okonkwo 78'	Report	Ciman 88'

Shanghai Stadium, Shanghai
Attendance: 56,312
Referee: Pablo Pozo (Chile)

19 August 2008
21:00

Argentina	3–0	Brazil
Agüero 52', 58'; Riquelme 76' (pen.)	Report

Beijing Workers' Stadium, Beijing
Attendance: 52,968
Referee: Martín Vázquez (Uruguay)

=== Bronze medal match ===
22 August 2008
19:00

Belgium	0–3	Brazil (bronze)
	Report	Diego 27'; Jô 45', 90+2'

Shanghai Stadium, Shanghai
Attendance: 50,705
Referee: Thomas Einwaller (Austria)

=== Gold medal match ===
23 August 2008
12:00

(silver) Nigeria	0–1	Argentina (gold)
	Report	Di María 58'

Beijing National Stadium, Beijing
Attendance: 89,102
Referee: Viktor Kassai (Hungary)

Source for cards:

== Final ranking ==
Pos	Team	Pld	W	D	L	GF	GA	GD	Pts
1	Argentina	6	6	0	0	11	2	+9	18
2	Nigeria	6	4	1	1	10	4	+6	13
3	Brazil	6	5	0	1	14	3	+11	15
4	Belgium	6	3	0	3	7	10	−3	9
5	Italy	4	2	1	1	8	3	+5	7
6	Ivory Coast	4	2	0	2	6	6	0	6
7	Netherlands	4	1	2	1	4	4	0	5
8	Cameroon	4	1	2	1	2	3	−1	5
9	United States	3	1	1	1	4	4	0	4
10	South Korea	3	1	1	1	2	4	−2	4
11	Australia	3	0	1	2	1	3	−2	1
12	Serbia	3	0	1	2	3	7	−4	1
13	China	3	0	1	2	1	6	−5	1
14	New Zealand	3	0	1	2	1	7	−6	1
15	Japan	3	0	0	3	1	4	−3	0
16	Honduras	3	0	0	3	0	5	−5	0

Source: IOC

== Statistics ==
=== Goalscorers ===
With four goals, Giuseppe Rossi of Italy was the top scorer in the tournament. In total, 75 goals were scored by 53 different players, with only one of them credited as own goal.

4 goals

- (Italy) Giuseppe Rossi

3 goals

- (Belgium) Mousa Dembélé
- (Nigeria) Victor Obinna

2 goals

- (Argentina) Sergio Agüero
- (Argentina) Ángel Di María
- (Argentina) Ezequiel Lavezzi
- (Argentina) Lionel Messi
- (Belgium) Kevin Mirallas
- (Brazil) Diego
- (Brazil) Jô
- (Brazil) Thiago Neves
- (Brazil) Ronaldinho
- (Brazil) Rafael Sóbis
- (Ivory Coast) Sekou Cissé
- (Ivory Coast) Salomon Kalou
- (Netherlands) Gerald Sibon
- (Nigeria) Chinedu Obasi
- (United States) Sacha Kljestan

1 goal

- (Argentina) Lautaro Acosta
- (Argentina) Diego Buonanotte
- (Argentina) Juan Román Riquelme
- (Australia) Ruben Zadkovich
- (Belgium) Laurent Ciman
- (Belgium) Faris Haroun
- (Brazil) Anderson
- (Brazil) Hernanes
- (Brazil) Marcelo
- (Brazil) Alexandre Pato
- (Cameroon) Georges Mandjeck
- (Cameroon) Stéphane Mbia
- (China) Dong Fangzhuo
- (Italy) Robert Acquafresca
- (Italy) Sebastian Giovinco
- (Italy) Riccardo Montolivo
- (Italy) Tommaso Rocchi
- (Ivory Coast) Gervinho
- (Japan) Yohei Toyoda
- (South Korea) Kim Dong-jin
- (South Korea) Park Chu-young
- (Netherlands) Ryan Babel
- (Netherlands) Otman Bakkal
- (New Zealand) Jeremy Brockie
- (Nigeria) Olubayo Adefemi
- (Nigeria) Victor Anichebe
- (Nigeria) Peter Odemwingie
- (Nigeria) Chibuzor Okonkwo
- (Nigeria) Isaac Promise
- (Serbia) Miljan Mrdaković
- (Serbia) Slobodan Rajković
- (Serbia) Đorđe Rakić
- (United States) Jozy Altidore
- (United States) Stuart Holden

Own goals

- (Serbia) Slobodan Rajković (playing against Ivory Coast)
