= Qinhuangdao Olympic Sports Center Stadium =

Sports venue in Qinhuangdao, China

Coordinates: 39°54′26″N 119°32′52″E

Qinhuangdao Olympic Sports Center Stadium (simplified Chinese: 秦皇岛市奥体中心体育场; traditional Chinese: 秦皇島市奧體中心體育場; pinyin: Qínhuángdǎo Shì Ào Tǐ Zhōngxīn Tǐyùchǎng) served as one of the soccer venues during the 2008 Summer Olympics.

The multiuse stadium, which is used mostly for soccer matches, lies inside the Qinhuangdao Olympic Sports Center on the Hebei Avenue in Qinhuangdao, China.

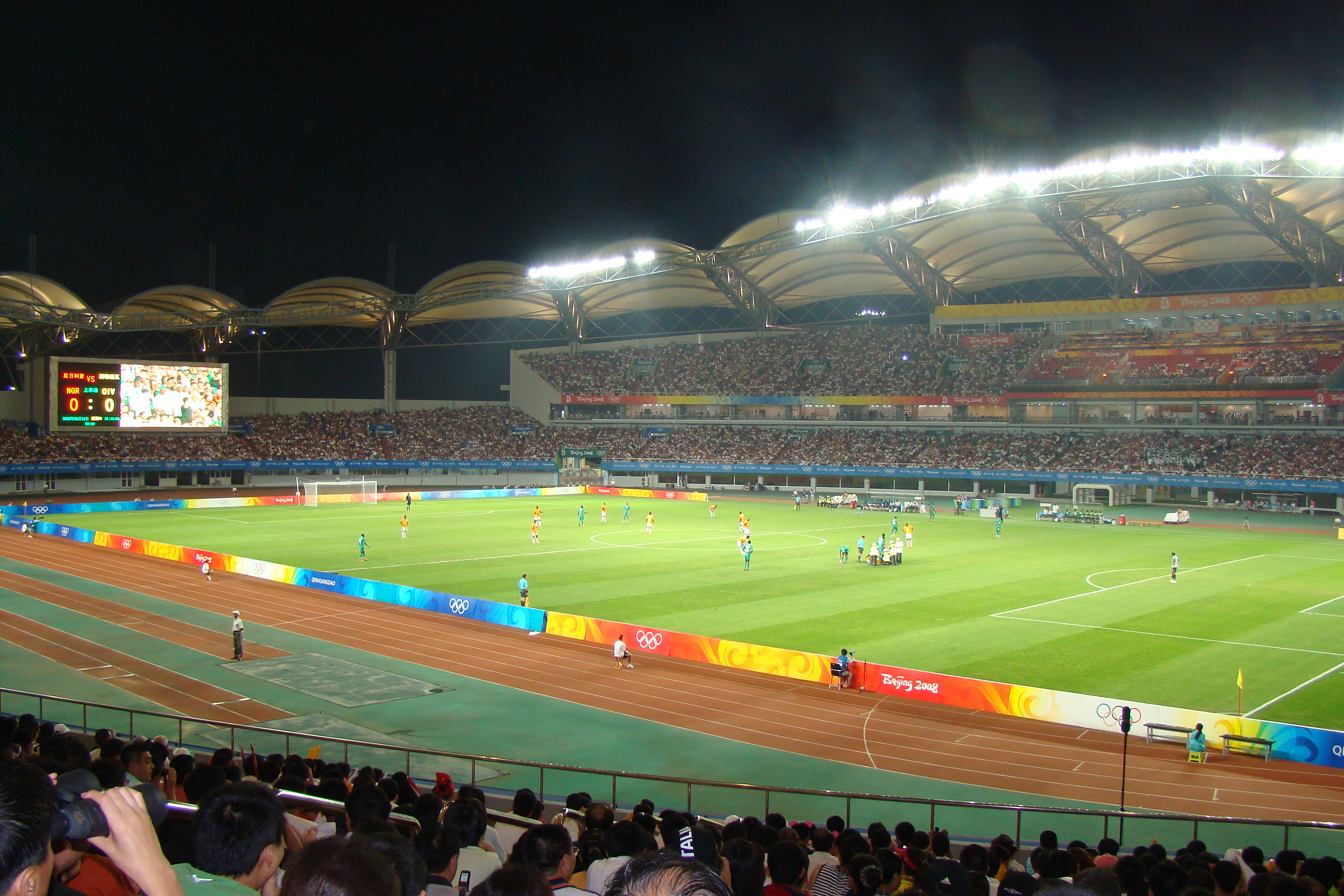
The stadium during the 2008 Summer Olympics

Its construction was started in May 2002 and was completed on July 30, 2004; it was the first new stadium to be built for the 2008 Summer Olympics. The sports center covers 168,000 square meters (1,810,000 sq ft); the Olympic-standard stadium has a seating capacity of 33,572, 0.2% of which are reserved for disabled people.

Until 2018, the stadium served as the home stadium for the former Hebei F.C. soccer club.

== 2008 Olympic Football Matches ==
Date	Time (UTC+08)	Team #1	Result	Team #2	Round	Attendance
6 August 2008	17:00	Japan	2-2	New Zealand	Group G	10,270
6 August 2008	19:45	Norway	2-0	United States	Group G	17,673
7 August 2008	17:00	Honduras	0-3	Italy	Group D	21,680
7 August 2008	19:45	South Korea	1-1	Cameroon	Group D	21,943
9 August 2008	17:00	United States	1-0	Japan	Group G	16,912
9 August 2008	19:45	New Zealand	0-1	Norway	Group G	7,285
10 August 2008	17:00	Cameroon	1-0	Honduras	Group D	28,657
10 August 2008	19:45	Italy	3-0	South Korea	Group D	29,455
12 August 2008	19:45	China	2-0	Argentina	Group E	31,492
13 August 2008	19:45	China	0-3	Brazil	Group A	38,790
15 August 2008	21:00	Sweden	0-2 (a.e.t.)	Germany	Quarter Finals (Women)	17,209
16 August 2008	21:00	Nigeria	2-0	Ivory Coast	Quarter Finals (Men)	28,944
