= Mustapha Fahim =

Moroccan footballer

Personal information
- Date of birth: 1938
- Date of death: 2005 (aged 66–67)

Youth career
- 1953-1956: Raja CA

Senior career*
Years	Team	Apps	(Gls)
1956-1967	Raja CA	20	
- Wydad AC

International career
- Morocco
- * Club domestic league appearances and goals

Mustapha Fahim nicknamed Milazzo (1938 – 2005) was a Moroccan footballer. He competed in the men's tournament at the 1964 Summer Olympics.
