= Ali Bouachra =

Moroccan footballer

Personal information
- Date of birth: 8 September 1940 (age 86)

International career
| Years | Team | Apps | (Gls) |
- Morocco

Ali Bouachra (Arabic: علي بوعشرة, born 8 September 1940) is a Moroccan footballer. He competed in the men's tournament at the 1964 Summer Olympics.
