= Árpád Orbán =

Hungarian footballer (1938–2008)

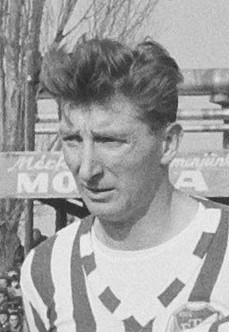
- Orbán in 1965

Personal information
- Date of birth: 14 March 1938
- Place of birth: Győr, Győr-Moson-Sopron, Hungary
- Date of death: 26 April 2008 (aged 70)
- Place of death: Győr, Győr-Moson-Sopron, Hungary
- Height: 1.90 m (6 ft 3 in)
- Position: Defender

Senior career*
Years	Team	Apps	(Gls)
1959–1972	Győri ETO FC	285	(8)

International career
1963–1964	Hungary Olympic	8	(0)
Medal record
Men's football
Representing Hungary
Olympic Games
Gold medal – first place	1964 Tokyo	Team competition
- * Club domestic league appearances and goals

Árpád Orbán (14 March 1938 – 26 April 2008) was a Hungarian Olympic champion football player.

== Career ==
Orbán, born in Győr, Győr-Moson-Sopron, Hungary, was Hungarian. He was Jewish.

He played for Győri ETO FC, Győr, in Hungary. He won a gold medal in football as part of the Hungarian football team at the 1964 Summer Olympics in Tokyo.

== See also ==
- List of select Jewish football (association; soccer) players
