= Abdelkader Morchid =

Moroccan footballer

Personal information
- Date of birth: 1938
- Place of birth: Rabat, Morocco
- Date of death: 31 October 2016 (aged 77–78)
- Place of death: Rabat, Morocco

International career
Years	Team	Apps	(Gls)
- Morocco

Abdelkader Morchid (1938 – 31 October 2016) was a Moroccan footballer. He competed in the men's tournament at the 1964 Summer Olympics.
