= Abdelkader Moukhtatif =

Moroccan footballer (1934–2022)

Personal information
- Full name: Abdelkader Moukhtatif
- Date of birth: 1934
- Date of death: 4 August 2022 (aged 87–88)
- Height: 1.77 m (5 ft 10 in)
- Position: Midfielder

Senior career*
Years	Team	Apps	(Gls)
1958–1971	FAR Rabat		

International career
- Morocco
- * Club domestic league appearances and goals

Abdelkader Moukhtatif (1934 – 4 August 2022) was a Moroccan footballer who played as a midfielder. He played for FAR Rabat between 1958 and 1971.

He competed in the men's tournament at the 1964 Summer Olympics.

He died on 4 August 2022.

== Honours ==
=== Club ===
Competition	Titles	Seasons
Botola Pro	7	1960–61, 1961–62, 1962–63, 1963–64, 1966–67, 1967–68, 1969–70
Throne Cup (Coupe du Trône)	1	1958–59
