= Abdelkader Mohamed =

Moroccan footballer (born 1935)

Personal information
- Date of birth: 1935 (age 90–91)

Senior career*
Years	Team	Apps	(Gls)
- FAR Rabat

International career
- Morocco
- * Club domestic league appearances and goals

Abdelkader Mohamed (born 1935) is a Moroccan footballer. He competed in the men's tournament at the 1964 Summer Olympics.
