= Abdelghani El Mansouri =

Moroccan footballer (1942–2026)

Personal information
- Date of birth: 1942
- Place of birth: Marrakesh, French protectorate in Morocco
- Date of death: 8 October 2026 (aged 84)
- Place of death: Marrakesh, Morocco
- Height: 1.76 m (5 ft 9 in)
- Position: Defender

International career
Years	Team	Apps	(Gls)
- Morocco

Abdelghani El Mansouri (Arabic: عبد الغني المنصوري; 1942 – 8 October 2026) was a Moroccan footballer who played as a defender. He competed in the men's tournament at the 1964 Summer Olympics. El Mansouri died in Marrakesh on 8 October 2026, at the age of 84.
