= Ali Bendayan =

Moroccan footballer (1943–2026)

Personal information
- Date of birth: 1943
- Place of birth: Casablanca, Morocco
- Date of death: 28 September 2026 (aged 82–83)
- Place of death: Casablanca, Morocco
- Height: 1.70 m (5 ft 7 in)
- Position: Forward

Youth career
- 1960–1963: Raja CA

Senior career*
Years	Team	Apps	(Gls)
1963–1968	Raja CA		
1968–1969	Wydad AC		
1969–1971	Raja CA		

International career
- Morocco
- * Club domestic league appearances and goals

Ali Bendayan (Arabic: علي بن دايان) nicknamed Aliouat (1943 – 28 September 2026) was a Moroccan professional footballer who played as a forward for Raja CA and the Moroccan national team. He competed in the men's tournament at the 1964 Summer Olympics. Bendayan died on 28 September 2026.
