= Abderrazak Nijam =

Moroccan footballer

Personal information
- Date of birth: 1941 (age 84–85)

International career
Years	Team	Apps	(Gls)
- Morocco

Abderrazak Nijam (born 1941) is a Moroccan footballer. He competed in the men's tournament at the 1964 Summer Olympics.
