= Amar Bensiffedine =

Moroccan footballer (born 1938)

Personal information
- Date of birth: 1938 (age 87–88)

Senior career*
Years	Team	Apps	(Gls)
- FAR Rabat

International career
- Morocco
- * Club domestic league appearances and goals

Amar Bensiffedine (born 1938) is a Moroccan footballer. He competed in the men's tournament at the 1964 Summer Olympics.
