= Football at the 1960 Summer Olympics – Men's qualification =

Summer Olympics – Men's Football Qualifiers
Tournament details
- Dates: 26 June 1959 – 18 May 1960
- Teams: 44

Tournament statistics
- Matches played: 101
- Goals scored: 138 (1.37 per match)

This is the overview of the qualification for the football tournament at the 1960 Summer Olympics.

== Qualified teams ==
| Team | Method of qualification | Date of qualification | Total times qualified | Current consecutive appearances | Previous best performance |
|---|---|---|---|---|---|
| Italy | Hosts | 15 June 1955 | 1 | 1 | Gold medal (1936) |
| Denmark | Europe Group 1 winners | 21 August 1959 | 1 | 1 | Silver medal (1908, 1912) |
| Poland | Europe Group 2 winners | 24 November 1959 | 2 | 1 | Fourth place (1936) |
| Turkey | Middle East winners | 24 November 1959 | 2 | 1 | Quarter-finals (1948, 1948) |
| Great Britain | Europe Group 5 winners | 2 April 1960 | 2 | 4 | Gold medal (1900, 1908, 1912) |
| United Arab Republic | Africa second round winners | 3 April 1960 | 2 | 1 | Fourth place (1928) |
| Hungary | Europe Group 7 winners | 6 April 1960 | 2 | 1 | Gold medal (1952) |
| Tunisia | Africa second round runners-up | 17 April 1960 | 1 | 1 | – |
| Yugoslavia | Europe Group 4 winners | 24 April 1960 | 2 | 3 | Silver medal (1948, 1952, 1956) |
| Argentina | Americas second round winners | 24 April 1960 | 1 | 1 | Silver medal (1928) |
| Peru | Americas second round runners-up | 24 April 1960 | 1 | 1 | Quarter-finals (1936) |
| Brazil | Americas second round third place | 27 April 1960 | 1 | 1 | – |
| Taiwan | Asia second round winner | 30 April 1960 | 1 | 1 | – |
| India | Asia second round winner | 30 April 1960 | 2 | 3 | Fourth place (1956) |
| Bulgaria | Europe Group 3 winners | 1 May 1960 | 2 | 1 | Bronze medal (1956) |
| France | Europe Group 6 winners | 1 May 1960 | 1 | 1 | Silver medal (1900) |

== Qualification process ==
- Africa: 2
- Americas: 3
- Asia: 2
- Europe: 7
- Middle East: 1
- Hosts: 1

=== Summary of qualification ===
| Region | Available slots in finals | Teams started | Teams eliminated | Teams qualified | Qualifying start date | Qualifying end date |
|---|---|---|---|---|---|---|
| Africa | 2 | 9 | 7 | 2 | 1 November 1959 | 22 April 1960 |
| Americas | 3 | 10 | 7 | 3 | 8 October 1959 | 30 April 1960 |
| Asia | 2 | 8 | 6 | 2 | 27 August 1959 | 30 April 1960 |
| Europe | 7 | 22 | 15 | 7 | 26 June 1959 | 1 May 1960 |
| Middle East | 1 | 3 | 2 | 1 | 15 November 1959 | 15 December 1959 |
| Total | 15 | 52 | 37 | 15 | 26 June 1959 | 1 May 1960 |

== Format ==
The formats of the qualifying competitions depended on each region (see below). Each round was played in either of the following formats:

- League format, in which more than two teams formed groups to play home-and-away round-robin matches, or single round-robin matches hosted by one of the participating teams or on neutral territory.
- Knockout format, in which two teams played home-and-away two-legged matches or single-legged matches.

=== Tiebreakers ===
1. Points (2 points for a win, 1 point for a draw, 0 points for a loss)
2. Overall goal difference
3. Overall goals scored

== Europe ==
=== Final positions (final round) ===
Group 1
Group 2
Group 3

| Pos | Team | Pld | Pts |
|---|---|---|---|
| 1 | Denmark | 4 | 7 |
| 2 | Iceland | 4 | 3 |
| 3 | Norway | 4 | 2 |

Source: RSSSF

| Pos | Team | Pld | Pts |
|---|---|---|---|
| 1 | Poland | 4 | 8 |
| 2 | West Germany | 4 | 2 |
| 3 | Finland | 4 | 2 |

Source: RSSSF

| Pos | Team | Pld | Pts |
|---|---|---|---|
| 1 | Bulgaria | 4 | 5 |
| 2 | Soviet Union | 4 | 4 |
| 3 | Romania | 4 | 3 |

Source: RSSSF
Group 4
Group 5
Group 6

| Pos | Team | Pld | Pts |
|---|---|---|---|
| 1 | Yugoslavia | 4 | 5 |
| 2 | Israel | 4 | 5 |
| 3 | Greece | 4 | 2 |

Source: RSSSF

| Pos | Team | Pld | Pts |
|---|---|---|---|
| 1 | Great Britain | 4 | 7 |
| 2 | Republic of Ireland | 4 | 3 |
| 3 | Netherlands | 4 | 2 |

Source: RSSSF

| Pos | Team | Pld | Pts |
|---|---|---|---|
| 1 | France | 4 | 6 |
| 2 | Luxembourg | 4 | 4 |
| 3 | Switzerland | 4 | 2 |

Source: RSSSF
Group 7

| Pos | Team | Pld | Pts |
|---|---|---|---|
| 1 | Hungary | 4 | 8 |
| 2 | Czechoslovakia | 4 | 3 |
| 3 | Austria | 4 | 1 |

Source: RSSSF

== Americas ==
- First round: 10 teams played home-and-away over two legs. The five winners advanced to the second round.
- Second round: 5 teams which advanced from the first round play round-robin matches. The top three teams of the group qualified for the Summer Olympics.

=== Final positions (second round) ===
| Pos | Team | Pld | Pts |
|---|---|---|---|
| 1 | Argentina | 4 | 8 |
| 2 | Peru (H) | 4 | 6 |
| 3 | Brazil | 4 | 4 |
| 4 | Mexico | 4 | 2 |
| 5 | Suriname | 4 | 0 |

Source: RSSSF
(H) Hosts

== Africa ==
- First round: Three groups of three teams played home-and-away round-robin matches. The winner of each group advances to the second round.
- Second round: Three teams which advanced from the first round play home-and-away round-robin matches. The top two teams of the group qualified for the Summer Olympics.

=== Final positions (second round) ===
| Pos | Team | Pld | Pts |
|---|---|---|---|
| 1 | United Arab Republic | 4 | 7 |
| 2 | Tunisia | 4 | 3 |
| 3 | Sudan | 4 | 2 |

Source: RSSSF

== Asia ==
- First round: Eight teams played home-and-away over two legs. The four winners advanced to the second round.
- Second round: Four teams from the first round played home-and-away over two legs. The two winners qualified for the Summer Olympics.

=== Second round ===
| Team 1 | Agg. | Team 2 | 1st leg | 2nd leg |
|---|---|---|---|---|
| India | 6–2 | Indonesia | 4–2 | 2–0 |
| Taiwan | 2–2 | South Korea | 1–2 | 1–0 (Note: The tie was awarded to Taiwan, due to South Korea being disqualified as the second leg being abandoned at 23rd minute, with Taiwan winning 1–0, as South Korea players attacked referee John Petrie after he awarded a penalty to Taiwan.) |

== Middle East ==
The three teams played a home-and-away round-robin tournament.

=== Final positions ===
| Pos | Team | Pld | Pts |
|---|---|---|---|
| 1 | Turkey | 4 | 8 |
| 2 | Iraq | 4 | 4 |
| 3 | Lebanon | 4 | 0 |

Source: RSSSF
