= 1959–60 Hamburger SV season =

Hamburger SV
1959–60 season
- Manager: Günter Mahlmann
- Stadium: Sportplatz at Rothenbaum
- Oberliga Nord: 1st
- German football championship: Champions
- DFB-Pokal: Semi-finals
- Top goalscorer: League: Uwe Seeler (36); All: Uwe Seeler (49)

The 1959–60 Hamburger SV season was the 13th consecutive season playing in the Oberliga Nord, the first-tier of football in the region. Hamburg also competed in this season's editions of the German football championship and the 1958–59 DFB-Pokal, which was contested in the late autumn of 1959.

In 1960, HSV became German champions for the first time since 1928, defeating 1. FC Köln 3–2 in the championship final. Seeler, who scored twice in the final, was named the inaugural winner of the West German Footballer of the Year.

== Competitions ==
=== Overall record ===
Competition	First match	Last match	Starting round	Final position	Record							
Competition	First match	Last match	Starting round	Final position	Pld	W	D	L	GF	GA	GD	Win %
Oberliga Nord	16 August 1959	24 April 1960	Matchday 1	Winners	30	20	5	5	96	38	+58	66.67
German football championship	14 May 1960	25 June 1960	Group stage	Winners	7	5	1	1	22	13	+9	71.43
DFB-Pokal	12 December 1959		First round	Semi-finals	1	0	0	1	1	2	−1	0.00
Total					38	25	6	7	119	53	+66	65.79

Source: World Football

=== Oberliga Nord ===
==== League table ====
Pos	Team	Pld	W	D	L	GF	GA	GD	Pts	Promotion, qualification or relegation
1	Hamburger SV (C)	30	20	5	5	96	38	+58	45	Qualification to German championship
2	Werder Bremen	30	18	5	7	71	47	+24	41	Qualification to German championship
3	VfL Osnabrück	30	17	5	8	54	33	+21	39	
4	FC St. Pauli	30	14	8	8	54	38	+16	36	
5	TuS Bremerhaven 93	30	13	8	9	59	47	+12	34	

Source: RSSSF.com
Rules for classification: 1) Points;
(C) Champions

=== German football championship ===
==== Results ====
Win	Draw	Loss

Date	Round	Opponent	Venue	Result	Scorers	Attendance	Referee
14 May 1960	Group stage	Borussia Neunkirchen	Away	0–4	Schreier (own goal), Seeler (3)	35,000	Baumgärtel
21 May 1960	Group stage	Karlsruher SC	Home	3–3	Seeler (2), Neisner	70,000	Thier
28 May 1960	Group stage	Westfalia Herne	Away	4–3	Dörfel, Dehn, Seeler (2)	35,000	Sparing
4 June 1960	Group stage	Westfalia Herne	Home	2–1	Seeler (2)	71,000	Fischer
11 June 1960	Group stage	Karlsruher SC	Away	3–4	Neisner, Dehn, Ruppenstein (own goal)	46,000	Ommerborn
18 June 1960	Group stage	Borussia Neunkirchen	Home	6–0	Dehn, Dörfel (3), Seeler (2)	67,000	Tschenscher
25 June 1960	Final	1. FC Köln	Neutral	3–2	Seeler (2), Dörfel	71,000	Kandlbinder

=== DFB Pokal ===
==== Results ====
Win	Draw	Loss

Date	Round	Opponent	Venue	Result	Scorers	Attendance	Referee
12 December 1959	Semi-finals	Schwarz-Weiß Essen	Home	1–2	Wulf	15,000	Sparing
