= 1962–63 Hamburger SV season =

Hamburger SV
1962–63 season
- Manager: Martin Wilke
- Stadium: Sportplatz at Rothenbaum
- Oberliga Nord: 1st
- German football championship: Group stage
- DFB-Pokal: Winners
- Top goalscorer: League: Uwe Seeler (32); All: Uwe Seeler (40)

The 1962–63 Hamburger SV season was the 16th and final season playing in the Oberliga Nord, the first-tier of football in the region, before the formation of the national Bundesliga in 1963. Hamburg also competed in this season's editions of the German football championship and the DFB-Pokal.

On 14 August 1963, HSV won the DFB-Pokal for the first time in club history, defeating Borussia Dortmund in the final, at the Niedersachsenstadion in Hanover, by a score of 3–0 courtesy of an Uwe Seeler hat-trick.

== Competitions ==
=== Overall record ===
Competition	First match	Last match	Starting round	Final position	Record							
Competition	First match	Last match	Starting round	Final position	Pld	W	D	L	GF	GA	GD	Win %
Oberliga Nord	19 August 1962	28 April 1963	Matchday 1	Winners	30	22	5	3	100	40	+60	73.33
German football championship	25 May 1960	22 June 1960	Group stage	Group stage	6	1	1	4	7	10	−3	16.67
DFB-Pokal	30 June 1963	14 August 1963	First round	Winners	5	4	0	1	10	2	+8	80.00
Total					41	27	6	8	117	52	+65	65.85

Source: World Football

=== Oberliga Nord ===
==== League table ====
Pos	Team	Pld	W	D	L	GF	GA	GD	Pts	Qualification or relegation
1	Hamburger SV	30	22	5	3	100	40	+60	49	Qualification for German championship & Bundesliga
2	Werder Bremen	30	22	3	5	102	44	+58	47	Qualification for German championship & Bundesliga
3	Eintracht Braunschweig	30	17	3	10	62	41	+21	37	Qualification to Bundesliga
4	VfR Neumünster (R)	30	14	7	9	48	46	+2	35	Relegation to Regionalliga Nord
5	Holstein Kiel (R)	30	14	6	10	73	58	+15	34	Relegation to Regionalliga Nord

Source: RSSSF.com
Rules for classification: 1) Points;
(R) Relegated

=== German football championship ===
==== Results ====
Win	Draw	Loss

Date	Round	Opponent	Venue	Result	Scorers	Attendance	Referee
25 May 1963	Group stage	Borussia Neunkirchen	Away	0–3		40,000	Fischer
29 May 1963	Group stage	TSV 1860 Munich	Home	3–0	Wulf, Dörfel, Seeler	58,000	Malka
1 June 1963	Group stage	Borussia Dortmund	Away	2–3	Seeler, Schmidt (own goal)	39,000	Tschenscher
8 June 1963	Group stage	Borussia Dortmund	Home	0–1		60,000	Kreitlein
15 June 1963	Group stage	TSV 1860 Munich	Away	1–2	Kreuz	47,000	Treichel
22 June 1963	Group stage	Borussia Neunkirchen	Home	1–1	Fritzsche	20,000	Sparing

=== DFB-Pokal ===
==== Results ====
Win	Draw	Loss

Date	Round	Opponent	Venue	Result	Scorers	Attendance	Referee
30 June 1963	Round of 16	FC Bayern Hof	Away	5–2	Seeler (2), Kreuz, Dörfel (2)	12,000	Fritz
31 July 1963	Quarter-finals	1. FC Saarbrücken	Home	1–0	Seeler	20,000	Schmidt
7 August 1963	Semi-finals	Wuppertaler SV	Away	1–0	Boyens	38,000	Fritz
14 August 1963	Final	Borussia Dortmund	Neutral	3–0	Seeler (3)	70,000	Kreitlein
