= Football at the 1960 Summer Olympics – Men's European Qualifiers – Preliminary round =

East Germany	West Germany
(East Germany)	(West Germany)
1	4

First leg
East Germany	West Germany
0	2
- Date: 16 September 1959
- Venue: Walter-Ulbricht-Stadion, East Berlin
- Attendance: 0

Second leg
West Germany	East Germany
2	1
- Date: 23 September 1959
- Venue: Rheinstadion, Düsseldorf
- Attendance: 0

The preliminary round of the European matches for the 1960 Summer Olympics football qualification consisted of a two-legged tie that determined the last spot of the group stage. The tie featured East Germany and West Germany, and were played in secret without any spectators permitted.

== Background ==
During this time, the International Olympic Committee only recognized the West German Olympic Sports Confederation as the one committee for Germany. Two ideas were proposed; either a unified team would enter qualification, or East and West Germany field separate teams in a play-off for qualification.

A play-off was confirmed between the two teams, as well as the matches played secretly and without spectators. Scottish newspaper The Glasgow Herald reported that those only present in the stands were team managers, trainers, and 60 newspaper journalists. Despite the secretive prospect of the matches, they were televised but viewers were not permitted to know the venues the matches were taking place.

== Format ==
In the preliminary round, the two teams competed in a two-legged home-and-away playoff. The winner advanced to the group stage of the European qualification.

== Teams ==
- East Germany
- West Germany

== Matches ==
Team 1	Agg.	Team 2	1st leg	2nd leg
East Germany	1–4	West Germany	0–2	1–2

16 September 1959

East Germany	0–2	West Germany
	Report	Fischer 53' (o.g.); Dörfel 83'

Walter-Ulbricht-Stadion, East Berlin
Attendance: 0 (Note: Match was played in secret with no spectators permitted.)
Referee: (Czechoslovakia)
23 September 1959

West Germany	2–1	East Germany
Thimm 33'; Wilkening 65'	Report	Schröter 14' (pen.)

Rheinstadion, Düsseldorf
Attendance: 0 (Note: Match was played in secret with no spectators permitted.)
Referee: Martens (Netherlands)

West Germany won 4–1 on aggregate and advanced to the group stage.

== Goalscorers ==
There were 5 goals scored in 2 matches, for an average of 2.5 goals per match.

1 goal

- (East Germany Olympic football team) Günter Schröter
- (Germany Olympic football team) Charly Dörfel
- (Germany Olympic football team) Joachim Thimm
- (Germany Olympic football team) Heinz Wilkening

1 own goal

- (East Germany Olympic football team) Dieter Fischer (against West Germany)
