= Football at the 1960 Summer Olympics – Men's European Qualifiers – Group 2 =

The 1960 Summer Olympics football qualification – Europe Group 2 was one of the seven European groups in the Summer Olympics football qualification tournament to decide which teams would qualify for the Football at the 1960 Summer Olympics finals tournament in Italy. Group 2 consisted of three teams: Finland, Poland and West Germany. The teams played against each other home-and-away in a round-robin format. The group winners, Poland, qualified directly for the Summer Olympics football finals.

== Standings ==
| Pos | Team | Pld | W | D | L | GF | GA | GD | Pts | Qualification | Poland | Germany | Finland |
|---|---|---|---|---|---|---|---|---|---|---|---|---|---|
| 1 | Poland | 4 | 4 | 0 | 0 | 15 | 4 | +11 | 8 | Qualification for 1960 Summer Olympics | — | 3–1 | 6–2 |
| 2 | West Germany | 4 | 1 | 0 | 3 | 5 | 10 | −5 | 2 | | 0–3 | — | 2–1 |
| 3 | Finland | 4 | 1 | 0 | 3 | 7 | 13 | −6 | 2 | | 1–3 | 3–2 | — |

Source: RSSSF

== Matches ==
18 October 1959
14:00 UTC+2

| Finland | 1–3 | Poland |
|---|---|---|
| Kankkonen 48' | Report | Pol 3'; Hachorek 58'; Gawroński 81' |

Helsingin Olympiastadion, Helsinki
Attendance: 10,818
Referee: Bertil Lööw (Sweden)

8 November 1959
12:00 UTC+1

| Poland | 6–2 | Finland |
|---|---|---|
| Pol 14', 19', 44'; Hachorek 43'; Sykta 53'; Szarzyński 79' | Report | Österlund 7'; Peltonen 20' |

Silesian Stadium, Chorzów
Attendance: 22,000
Referee: Werner Bergmann (East Germany)

11 November 1959
14:30 UTC+1

| West Germany | 2–1 | Finland |
|---|---|---|
| Forss 4' (o.g.); Dörfel 55' | Report | Kankkonen 85' |

Leimbachstadion, Siegen
Attendance: 22,000
Referee: Antonín Vrbovec (Czechoslovakia)

24 November 1959

| West Germany | 0–3 | Poland |
|---|---|---|
| | Report | Hachorek 17'; Baszkiewicz 29'; Pol 63' |

18 April 1960

| Poland | 3–1 | West Germany |
|---|---|---|
| Zientara 23', 63'; Lentner 53' | Report | Walenciak 71' |

18 May 1960
18:30 UTC+2

| Finland | 3–2 | West Germany |
|---|---|---|
| Pahlman 3'; Nevalainen 53'; Peltonen 74' | Report | Himmelmann 4'; Rühl 72' |

Helsingin Olympiastadion, Helsinki
Attendance: 7,578
Referee: Erik Johansson (Sweden)

== Goalscorers ==
There were 27 goals scored in 6 matches, for an average of 4.5 goals per match.

5 goals

- (Poland national football team) Ernest Pohl

3 goals

- (Poland national football team) Stanisław Hachorek

2 goals

- (Finland national football team) Hannu Kankkonen
- (Poland national football team) Edmund Zientara

1 goal

- (Finland national football team) Unto Nevalainen
- (Finland national football team) Tor Österlund
- (Finland national football team) Kai Pahlman
- (Finland national football team) Juhani Peltonen
- (Poland national football team) Krzysztof Baszkiewicz
- (Poland national football team) Jan Gawroński
- (Poland national football team) Roman Lentner
- (Poland national football team) Andrzej Sykta
- (Poland national football team) Zbigniew Szarzyński
- (Germany Olympic football team) Charly Dörfel
- (Germany Olympic football team) Hans Jürgen Himmelmann
- (Germany Olympic football team) Carl-Heinz Rühl
- (Germany Olympic football team) Gustav Walenciak

1 own goal

- (Finland national football team) Rainer Forss (against West Germany)
