= Football at the 1960 Summer Olympics – Men's Asian Qualifiers – First round =

International football competition

Tournament details
- Dates: 27 August – 20 December 1959
- Teams: 8

Tournament statistics
- Matches played: 5
- Goals scored: 18 (3.6 per match)

The Asian first round of 1960 Summer Olympics football qualification was played from 27 August to 20 December 1959.

== Summary ==
Team 1	Agg.	Team 2	1st leg	2nd leg
Australia	w/o (Note: The tie was awarded to Indonesia, as Australia withdrew due to expensive travels.)	Indonesia	—	—
Afghanistan	w/o (Note: The tie was awarded to India, as Afghanistan withdrew prior to the second leg.)	India	2–5	—
Thailand	2–6	Taiwan	1–3	1–3
Japan	1–2	South Korea	0–2	1–0

== Matches ==
Australia	w/o	Indonesia
	Report

December 1959

Indonesia	w/o	Australia
	Report

Indonesia won on walkover and advanced to the second round.

27 August 1959

Afghanistan	2–5	India
Ayubi ?'; Mosa ?'	Report	Banerjee ?'; Goswami ?'; Kempaiah ?'; Rehmatullah ?'; Lahiri ?'

December 1959

India	w/o	Afghanistan
	Report

India won on walkover and advanced to the second round.

30 August 1959

Thailand	1–3	Taiwan
	Report

13 September 1959

Taiwan	3–1	Thailand
	Report

Taiwan won 6–2 on aggregate and advanced to the second round.

13 December 1959

Japan	0–2	South Korea
	Report	Chung-min 51'; Jung-sik 65'

Korakuen Velodrome, Tokyo
Attendance: 20,000
20 December 1959

South Korea	0–1	Japan
	Report	Ninomiya 70'

Korakuen Velodrome, Tokyo
Attendance: 10,000

South Korea won 2–1 on aggregate and advanced to the second round.

== Goalscorers ==
There were 18 goals scored in 5 matches, for an average of 3.6 goals per match.

1 goal

- (Afghanistan national football team) Ayubi
- (Afghanistan national football team) Mosa
- (India national football team) P. K. Banerjee
- (India national football team) Chuni Goswami
- (India national football team) Mariappa Kempaiah
- (India national football team) Mohammed Rahmatullah
- (India national football team) Moloy Lahiri
- (Japan national football team) Hiroshi Ninomiya
- (South Korea national football team) Choi Chung-min
- (South Korea national football team) Moon Jung-sik
