= Football at the 1960 Summer Olympics – Men's European Qualifiers – Group 1 =

The 1960 Summer Olympics football qualification – Europe Group 1 was one of the seven European groups in the Summer Olympics football qualification tournament to decide which teams would qualify for the Football at the 1960 Summer Olympics finals tournament in Italy. Group 1 consisted of three teams: Denmark, Iceland and Norway. The teams played against each other home-and-away in a round-robin format. The group winners, Denmark, qualified directly for the Summer Olympics football finals.

== Standings ==
Pos	Team	Pld	W	D	L	GF	GA	GD	Pts	Qualification	Denmark	Iceland	Norway
1	Denmark	4	3	1	0	11	6	+5	7	Qualification for 1960 Summer Olympics	—	1–1	2–1
2	Iceland	4	1	1	2	5	7	−2	3		2–4	—	1–0
3	Norway	4	1	0	3	5	8	−3	2		2–4	2–1	—

Source: RSSSF

== Matches ==
26 June 1959
20:30 UTC+0

Iceland	2–4	Denmark
Jónsson 46'; Beck 80'	Report	Hansen 18', 50'; Madsen 28', 60'

Laugardalsvöllur, Reykjavík
Attendance: 11,000
Referee: Birger Nielsen (Norway)

2 July 1959
19:00 UTC+1

Denmark	2–1	Norway
Enoksen 53'; Madsen 55'	Report	Pedersen 70'

Københavns Idrætspark, Copenhagen
Attendance: 37,100
Referee: Albert Dusch (West Germany)

7 July 1959
20:30 UTC+0

Iceland	1–0	Norway
Jónsson 88'	Report

Laugardalsvöllur, Reykjavík
Attendance: 11,000
Referee: James Barclay (Scotland)

18 August 1959
18:00 UTC+1

Denmark	1–1	Iceland
Enoksen 82'	Report	Teitsson 29'

Københavns Idrætspark, Copenhagen
Attendance: 26,000
Referee: Dries van Leeuwen (Netherlands)

21 August 1959
18:00 UTC+2

Norway	2–1	Iceland
Backe 39'; Kristiansen 52'	Report	Steinsen 74'

Ullevaal Stadion, Oslo
Attendance: 23,143
Referee: Johan Alho (Finland)

13 September 1959
13:15 UTC+2

Norway	2–4	Denmark
Sørensen 38'; Kristiansen 56'	Report	Nielsen 29'; Pedersen 64'; Enoksen 53', 89'

Ullevaal Stadion, Oslo
Attendance: 30,142
Referee: Ken Aston (England)

== Goalscorers ==
There were 21 goals scored in 6 matches, for an average of 3.5 goals per match.

4 goals

- (Denmark national football team) Henning Enoksen

3 goals

- (Denmark national football team) Ole Madsen

2 goals

- (Denmark national football team) Jens Peter Hansen
- (Iceland national football team) Sveinn Jónsson
- (Norway national football team) Rolf Birger Pedersen

1 goal

- (Denmark national football team) Harald Nielsen
- (Denmark national football team) Poul Pedersen
- (Iceland national football team) Þór Beck
- (Iceland national football team) Örn Steinsen
- (Iceland national football team) Sveinn Teitsson
- (Norway national football team) Rolf Bjørn Backe
- (Norway national football team) Kjell Kristiansen
- (Norway national football team) Åge Sørensen
