= Nasser Haji Mokhtar =

Iranian footballer (1931–2005)

Personal information
- Full name: Nasser Haji Mokhtar
- Date of birth: 13 March 1931
- Place of birth: Iran
- Date of death: 22 August 2005 (aged 74)
- Position: Midfielder

Senior career*
Years	Team	Apps	(Gls)
1954	Nirooye Havaei		
1959	Taj SC		

International career
1959	Iran	6	(1)
- * Club domestic league appearances and goals

Nasser Haji Mokhtar (Persian: ناصر حاجی مختار; 13 March 1931 – 22 August 2005) was an Iranian footballer who played for Taj Tehran and Nirooye Havaei and the Iran national football team. Mokhtar died on 22 August 2005, at the age of 74.
