= 1960 German football championship =

1960 German championship
Deutsche Fußballmeisterschaft

Tournament details
- Country: West Germany
- Dates: 7 May – 25 June
- Teams: 9

Final positions
- Champions: Hamburger SV; 3rd German title
- Runners-up: 1. FC Köln
- European Cup: Hamburger SV

Tournament statistics
- Matches played: 26
- Goals scored: 120 (4.62 per match)
- Top goal scorer: Uwe Seeler (13 goals)

The 1960 German football championship was the culmination of the football season in the Federal Republic of Germany in 1959–60. Hamburger SV were crowned champions for the third time after a group stage and a final, having previously won the title in 1923 and 1928. It was the club's third appearance in the final in four years, having lost the 1957 and 1958 final. On the strength of this title, the club participated in the 1960-61 European Cup, where HSV lost to FC Barcelona in the semi-finals.

Hamburg's Uwe Seeler was the 1960 championships top scorer with 13 goals, the highest total for any top scorer in the competition after the Second World War.

Runners-up 1. FC Köln made its first appearance in the national title game. The 1960 German championship saw an attendance record for the Oberliga era with 87,739 seeing Tasmania 1900 Berlin hosting 1. FC Köln.

The format used to determine the German champion was the same as the one used in the 1959 season. Nine clubs qualified for the tournament, with the runners-up of West and South having to play a qualifying match. The remaining eight clubs then played a home-and-away round in two groups of four, with the two group winners entering the final.

== Qualified teams ==
The teams qualified through the 1959–60 Oberliga season:

Club	Qualified from
Hamburger SV	Oberliga Nord champions
SV Werder Bremen	Oberliga Nord runners-up
1. FC Köln	Oberliga West champions
Westfalia Herne	Oberliga West runners-up
Tasmania 1900 Berlin	Oberliga Berlin champions
FK Pirmasens	Oberliga Südwest champions
Borussia Neunkirchen	Oberliga Südwest runners-up
Karlsruher SC	Oberliga Süd champions
Kickers Offenbach	Oberliga Süd runners-up

== Competition ==
=== Qualifying round ===
Date	Match			Result	Stadium	Attendance
7 May 1960	Westfalia Herne	–	Kickers Offenbach	1-0 (1–0)	Hannover, Niedersachsenstadion	45,000

=== Group 1 ===
Pos	Team	Pld	W	D	L	GF	GA	GR	Pts	Qualification	HSV	KSC	BNE	SCW
1	Hamburger SV	6	4	1	1	22	11	2.000	9	Advance to final	—	3–3	6–0	2–1
2	Karlsruher SC	6	2	3	1	18	18	1.000	7		4–3	—	2–4	5–4
3	Borussia Neunkirchen	6	2	1	3	9	17	0.529	5		0–4	2–2	—	2–1
4	Westfalia Herne	6	1	1	4	13	16	0.813	3		3–4	2–2	2–1	—

Source: RSSSF
Rules for classification: 1) Points; 2) Goal ratio.

Group phase - Group 1
Match			Final result
Borussia Neunkirchen	-	Hamburger SV	0:4
Karlsruher SC	-	Westfalia Herne	5:4
Hamburger SV	-	Karlsruher SC	3:3
Westfalia Herne	-	Borussia Neunkirchen	2:1
Karlsruher SC	-	Borussia Neunkirchen	2:4
Westfalia Herne	-	Hamburger SV	3:4
Hamburger SV	-	Westfalia Herne	2:1
Borussia Neunkirchen	-	Karlsruher SC	2:2
Karlsruher SC	-	Hamburger SV	4:3
Borussia Neunkirchen	-	Westfalia Herne	2:1
Hamburger SV	-	Borussia Neunkirchen	6:0
Westfalia Herne	-	Karlsruher SC	2:2

=== Group 2 ===
Pos	Team	Pld	W	D	L	GF	GA	GR	Pts	Qualification	KOE	SVW	SCT	FKP
1	1. FC Köln	6	4	1	1	14	8	1.750	9	Advance to final	—	2–5	3–0	4–0
2	Werder Bremen	6	4	0	2	18	12	1.500	8		1–2	—	2–1	3–1
3	Tasmania Berlin	6	3	0	3	11	11	1.000	6		1–2	2–1	—	5–2
4	FK Pirmasens	6	0	1	5	9	21	0.429	1		1–1	4–6	1–2	—

Source: RSSSF
Rules for classification: 1) Points; 2) Goal ratio.

Group phase - Group 2
Match			Final result
Werder Bremen	-	1. FC Köln	1:2
FK Pirmasens	-	Tasmania 1900 Berlin	1:2
Tasmania 1900 Berlin	-	Werder Bremen	2:1
1. FC Köln	-	FK Pirmasens	4:0
Tasmania 1900 Berlin	-	1. FC Köln	1:2
FK Pirmasens	-	Werder Bremen	4:6
1. FC Köln	-	Tasmania 1900 Berlin	3:0
Werder Bremen	-	FK Pirmasens	3:1
FK Pirmasens	-	1. FC Köln	1:1
Werder Bremen	-	Tasmania 1900 Berlin	2:1
1. FC Köln	-	Werder Bremen	2:5
Tasmania 1900 Berlin	-	FK Pirmasens	5:2

=== Final ===
Date	Match			Result	Stadium	Attendance
25 June 1960	Hamburger SV	–	1. FC Köln	3–2 (0–0)	Frankfurt, Waldstadion	71,000

Hamburger SV:
GK	1	(West Germany) Horst Schnoor
RB	2	(West Germany) Erwin Piechowiak
CB	5	(West Germany) Jochen Meinke (c)
LB	3	(West Germany) Gerhard Krug
RH	4	(West Germany) Jürgen Werner
LH	6	(West Germany) Dieter Seeler
OR	7	(West Germany) Klaus Neisner
IR	8	(West Germany) Horst Dehn
CF	9	(West Germany) Uwe Seeler 53' 88'
IL	10	(West Germany) Klaus Stürmer
OL	11	(West Germany) Charly Dörfel 75'
Manager:
(West Germany) Günter Mahlmann

1. FC Köln:
GK	1	(West Germany) Fritz Ewert
RB	2	(West Germany) Georg Stollenwerk
CB	5	(West Germany) Leo Wilden
LB	3	(West Germany) Karl-Heinz Schnellinger
RH	4	(West Germany) Josef Röhrig
LH	6	(West Germany) Hans Sturm
OR	7	(West Germany) Helmut Rahn
IR	8	(West Germany) Christian Breuer 53'
CF	9	(West Germany) Christian Müller 86'
IL	10	(West Germany) Hans Schäfer (c)
OL	11	(West Germany) Karl-Heinz Thielen
Manager:
(West Germany) Oswald Pfau
