= Jürgen Werner (footballer, born 1935) =

German footballer, journalist, and official

Personal information
- Date of birth: 15 August 1935
- Place of birth: Hamburg, Germany
- Date of death: 28 May 2002 (aged 66)
- Place of death: Hamburg, Germany
- Position: Full back

Youth career
- Hamburger SV

Senior career*
Years	Team	Apps	(Gls)
1955–1963	Hamburger SV	169	(14)

International career
1961–1963	Germany	4	(2)
- * Club domestic league appearances and goals

Jürgen Werner (15 August 1935 – 28 May 2002) was a German football player, journalist and official.

Werner, a midfield player, came from the youth of Hamburger SV right into the first team, in a similar path to Uwe Seeler did, and, for his eight years of first-team experience between 1955 and 1963, has the 1960 German Championship title to prove his credentials. He refused to sign a professional contract in 1963, and was to become a teacher, retiring from the game of football. He also played a part-time role as journalist for weekly newspaper Die Zeit, and later became the Chairman of the Technical Committee of the German Football Association, a role he took up in 1986. In the second half of the 1990s, he was a member of HSV's supervisory board.

Werner played four games for the German team, between 1961 and 1963, and was picked for the 1962 FIFA World Cup, however, due to a training injury, did not pick up a World Cup appearance.

He was a technically sound half back and intelligent player, who later became headmaster for lawyer education in Hamburg.

Jürgen Werner died of cancer on 28 May 2002. In honour of Jürgen Werner, the academy of Hamburger SV got named Jürgen Werner Schule.
