= Football at the 1960 Summer Olympics – Men's European Qualifiers – Group 7 =

The 1960 Summer Olympics football qualification – Europe Group 7 was one of the seven European groups in the Summer Olympics football qualification tournament to decide which teams would qualify for the Football at the 1960 Summer Olympics finals tournament in Italy. Group 7 consisted of three teams: Austria, Czechoslovakia and Hungary. The teams played against each other home-and-away in a round-robin format. The group winners, Hungary, qualified directly for the Summer Olympics football finals.

== Standings ==
Pos	Team	Pld	W	D	L	GF	GA	GD	Pts	Qualification	Hungary	Czech Republic	Austria
1	Hungary	4	4	0	0	10	3	+7	8	Qualification for 1960 Summer Olympics	—	2–1	2–1
2	Czechoslovakia	4	1	1	2	4	5	−1	3		1–2	—	2–1
3	Austria	4	0	1	3	2	8	−6	1		0–4	0–0	—

Source: RSSSF

== Matches ==
7 October 1959

Austria	0–0	Czechoslovakia
	Report

22 November 1959

Hungary	2–1	Austria
Albert 1'; Várhidi 47' (pen.)	Report	Kohlhauser 6'

26 March 1960

Austria	0–4	Hungary
	Report	Orosz 28'; Albert 49', 65'; Sátori 74'

6 April 1960

Czechoslovakia	1–2	Hungary
Obert 87'	Report	Albert ?', ?'

24 April 1960

Hungary	2–1	Czechoslovakia
Kovács ?'; Sátori ?'	Report	Bubník ?'

30 April 1960

Czechoslovakia	2–1	Austria
Kadraba 34', 44'	Report	Skocik 58' (pen.)

== Goalscorers ==
There were 16 goals scored in 6 matches, for an average of 2.67 goals per match.

5 goals

- (Hungary Olympic football team) Flórián Albert

2 goals

- (Czechoslovakia Olympic football team) Josef Kadraba
- (Hungary Olympic football team) Imre Sátori

1 goal

- (Austria Olympic football team) Oskar Kohlhauser
- (Austria Olympic football team) Walter Skocik
- (Czechoslovakia Olympic football team) Vlastimil Bubník
- (Czechoslovakia Olympic football team) Jozef Obert
- (Hungary Olympic football team) Ferenc Kovács
- (Hungary Olympic football team) Pál Orosz
- (Hungary Olympic football team) Pál Várhidi
