= Football at the 1960 Summer Olympics – Men's Asian Qualifiers – Second round =

International football competition

Tournament details
- Dates: 14–30 April 1960
- Teams: 4

Tournament statistics
- Matches played: 4
- Goals scored: 12 (3 per match)
- Top scorer(s): (India) Simon Sundararaj (3 goals)

The Asian second round of 1960 Summer Olympics football qualification was played from 14 to 30 April 1960.

== Qualified teams ==
Bolded teams qualified for the Summer Olympics.

- **India**
- Indonesia
- South Korea
- **Taiwan**

== Summary ==
Team 1	Agg.	Team 2	1st leg	2nd leg
**India**	6–2	Indonesia	4–2	2–0
**Taiwan**	2–2	South Korea	1–2	1–0 (Note: The tie was awarded to Taiwan, due to South Korea being disqualified as the second leg being abandoned at 23rd minute, with Taiwan winning 1–0, as South Korea players attacked referee John Petrie after he awarded a penalty to Taiwan.)

== Matches ==
14 April 1960

India	4–2	Indonesia
Sundararaj 10', 63'; Kannan 21'; Balaram 73'	Report	Suratmo 9'; Timisela 84'

30 April 1960

Indonesia	0–2	India
	Report	Goswami 78'; Sundararaj 87'

India won 6–2 on aggregate and qualified for the Summer Olympics.

25 April 1960

Taiwan	1–2	South Korea
Chi-keung ?'	Report	Tae-sung ?'; Chung-min ?'

30 April 1960

South Korea	0–1 Abandoned	Taiwan
	Report	Chi-keung 15'

Attendance: 19,000
Referee: John Petrie (Scotland)

Taiwan won through South Korea's disqualification and qualified for the Summer Olympics.

== Goalscorers ==
There were 12 goals scored in 4 matches, for an average of 3 goals per match.

3 goals

- (India national football team) Simon Sundararaj

2 goals

- (Chinese Taipei national football team) Wong Chi-keung

1 goal

- (India national football team) Tulsidas Balaram
- (India national football team) Chuni Goswami
- (India national football team) Dharmalingam Kannan
- (Indonesia national football team) Omo Suratmo
- (Indonesia national football team) Henkie Timisela
- (South Korea national football team) Choi Chung-min
- (South Korea national football team) Cha Tae-sung
