= 1959–60 Oberliga =

Oberliga
- Season: 1959–60
- Champions: Hamburger SV Tasmania 1900 Berlin: 1. FC Köln; FK Pirmasens Karlsruher SC
- Relegated: Phönix Lübeck Eintracht Osnabrück Blau-Weiß 90 Berlin SV Norden-Nordwest Union 06 Berlin Fortuna Düsseldorf Schwarz-Weiß Essen VfR Kaiserslautern FV Speyer Viktoria Aschaffenburg Stuttgarter Kickers
- German champions: Hamburger SV; 3rd German title
- Top goalscorer: Uwe Seeler (36 goals)

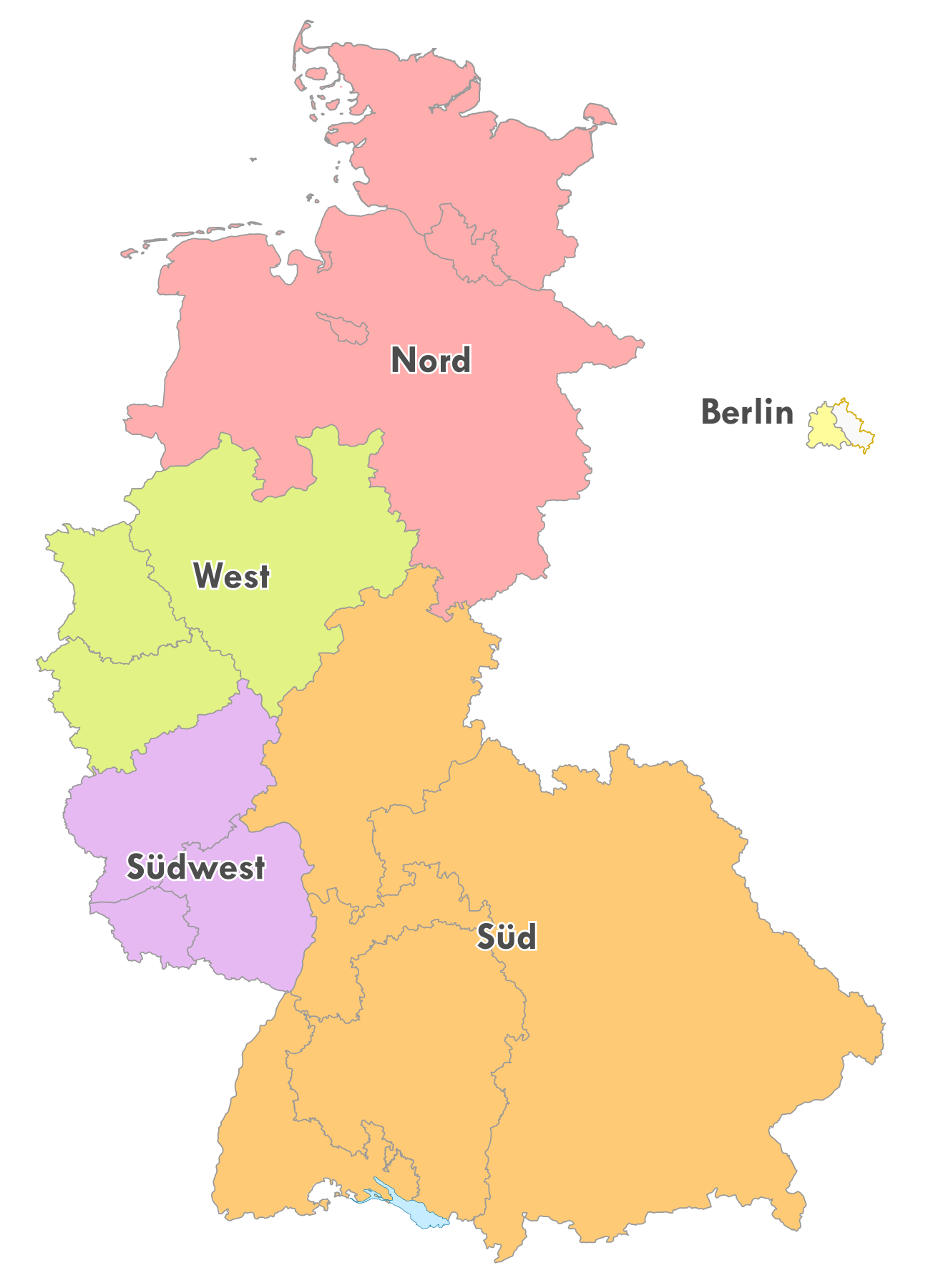
Map of the five German Oberligas 1945 to 1963

The 1959–60 Oberliga was the fifteenth season of the Oberliga, the first tier of the football league system in West Germany. The league operated in five regional divisions, Berlin, North, South, Southwest and West. The five league champions and the runners-up from the west, south, southwest and north then entered the 1960 German football championship which was won by Hamburger SV. It was Hamburg's fourth national championship and its first since 1928.

The 1960 German championship saw an attendance record for the Oberliga era with 87,739 seeing Tasmania 1900 Berlin hosting 1. FC Köln.

A similar-named league, the DDR-Oberliga, existed in East Germany, set at the first tier of the East German football league system. The 1960 DDR-Oberliga was won by ASK Vorwärts Berlin.

== Oberliga Nord ==
The 1959–60 season saw two new clubs in the league, VfB Lübeck and Eintracht Osnabrück, both promoted from the Amateurliga. The league's top scorer was Uwe Seeler of Hamburger SV with 36 goals, the highest total for any scorer in the five Oberligas in 1959–60.

Pos	Team	Pld	W	D	L	GF	GA	GD	Pts	Promotion, qualification or relegation
1	Hamburger SV (C)	30	20	5	5	96	38	+58	45	Qualification to German championship
2	Werder Bremen	30	18	5	7	71	47	+24	41	Qualification to German championship
3	VfL Osnabrück	30	17	5	8	54	33	+21	39	
4	FC St. Pauli	30	14	8	8	54	38	+16	36	
5	TuS Bremerhaven 93	30	13	8	9	59	47	+12	34	
6	Hannover 96	30	16	2	12	61	51	+10	34	
7	VfV Hildesheim	30	14	4	12	42	44	−2	32	
8	Eintracht Braunschweig	30	10	11	9	43	44	−1	31	
9	Holstein Kiel	30	8	11	11	50	52	−2	27	
10	VfR Neumünster	30	11	4	15	47	50	−3	26	
11	FC Altona 93	30	9	8	13	44	49	−5	26	
12	Concordia Hamburg	30	10	6	14	44	56	−12	26	
13	ASV Bergedorf 85	30	10	6	14	48	68	−20	26	
14	VfB Lübeck	30	9	7	14	40	53	−13	25	
15	Phönix Lübeck (R)	30	7	6	17	39	70	−31	20	Relegation to Amateurliga
16	Eintracht Osnabrück (R)	30	2	8	20	26	78	−52	12	Relegation to Amateurliga

Source: RSSSF.com
Rules for classification: 1) Points;
(C) Champions; (R) Relegated

== Oberliga Berlin ==
The 1959–60 season saw one new club in the league, SV Norden-Nordwest, promoted from the Amateurliga Berlin. The league's top scorer was Klaus Heuer of Berliner SV 1892 with 21 goals.

Pos	Team	Pld	W	D	L	GF	GA	GD	Pts	Promotion, qualification or relegation
1	Tasmania 1900 Berlin	30	18	6	6	67	33	+34	42	Qualification to German championship
2	Hertha BSC Berlin	30	17	7	6	67	28	+39	41	
3	Spandauer SV	30	18	5	7	58	36	+22	41	
4	Berliner SV 92	30	14	5	11	59	52	+7	33	
5	Wacker 04 Berlin	30	14	5	11	62	64	−2	33	
6	Tennis Borussia Berlin	30	15	2	13	67	57	+10	32	
7	Viktoria 89 Berlin	30	10	7	13	61	51	+10	27	
8	Hertha Zehlendorf	30	6	12	12	39	53	−14	24	
9	Blau-Weiß 90 Berlin (R)	30	9	5	16	37	67	−30	23	Relegation to Amateurliga Berlin
10	SV Norden-Nordwest (R)	30	7	6	17	41	73	−32	20	Relegation to Amateurliga Berlin
11	Union 06 Berlin (R)	30	4	6	20	36	80	−44	14	Relegation to Amateurliga Berlin

Source: RSSSF.com
Rules for classification: 1) Points;
(R) Relegated

== Oberliga West ==
The 1959–60 season saw two new clubs in the league, Sportfreunde Hamborn and 1958–59 DFB-Pokal winner Schwarz-Weiß Essen, both promoted from the 2. Oberliga West. The league's top scorer was Jürgen Schütz of Borussia Dortmund with 31 goals, the highest total for any top scorer in the history of the Oberliga West.

Pos	Team	Pld	W	D	L	GF	GA	GD	Pts	Promotion, qualification or relegation
1	1. FC Köln	30	19	6	5	85	39	+46	44	Qualification to German championship
2	Westfalia Herne	30	13	11	6	56	37	+19	37	Qualification to German championship
3	Borussia Dortmund	30	14	7	9	81	62	+19	35	
4	FC Schalke 04	30	15	4	11	59	41	+18	34	
5	Duisburger SV	30	9	12	9	47	51	−4	30	
6	Rot-Weiß Essen	30	12	5	13	46	60	−14	29	
7	Viktoria Köln	30	10	8	12	60	71	−11	28	
8	Meidericher SV	30	10	8	12	35	45	−10	28	
9	Alemannia Aachen	30	11	6	13	43	56	−13	28	
10	Preußen Münster	30	12	4	14	37	52	−15	28	
11	VfL Bochum	30	8	11	11	46	49	−3	27	
12	Sportfreunde Hamborn	30	8	11	11	45	48	−3	27	
13	Rot-Weiß Oberhausen	30	9	9	12	40	49	−9	27	
14	Borussia München-Gladbach	30	9	9	12	38	52	−14	27	
15	Fortuna Düsseldorf (R)	30	9	8	13	46	53	−7	26	Relegation to 2. Oberliga West
16	Schwarz-Weiß Essen (R)	30	9	7	14	47	46	+1	25	Relegation to 2. Oberliga West

Source: RSSSF.com
Rules for classification: 1) Points;
(R) Relegated

== Oberliga Südwest ==
The 1959–60 season saw two new clubs in the league, VfR Kaiserslautern and Ludwigshafener SC, both promoted from the 2. Oberliga Südwest. The league's top scorer was Helmut Kapitulski of FK Pirmasens with 27 goals.

Pos	Team	Pld	W	D	L	GF	GA	GD	Pts	Promotion, qualification or relegation
1	FK Pirmasens	30	20	4	6	92	43	+49	44	Qualification to German championship
2	Borussia Neunkirchen	30	20	1	9	68	47	+21	41	Qualification to German championship
3	1. FC Saarbrücken	30	14	11	5	65	39	+26	39	
4	Phönix Ludwigshafen	30	12	13	5	48	36	+12	37	
5	1. FC Kaiserslautern	30	15	6	9	56	37	+19	36	
6	SC Ludwigshafen	30	17	1	12	69	56	+13	35	
7	Wormatia Worms	30	13	9	8	53	46	+7	35	
8	TuRa Ludwigshafen	30	9	10	11	45	49	−4	28	
9	Saar 05 Saarbrücken	30	11	4	15	59	55	+4	26	
10	Sportfreunde Saarbrücken	30	10	5	15	45	53	−8	25	
11	VfR Frankenthal	30	9	6	15	51	63	−12	24	
12	FSV Mainz 05	30	10	4	16	38	58	−20	24	
13	Eintracht Kreuznach	30	10	4	16	36	58	−22	24	
14	Eintracht Trier	30	8	6	16	37	75	−38	22	
15	VfR Kaiserslautern (R)	30	6	9	15	39	56	−17	21	Relegation to 2. Oberliga Südwest
16	FV Speyer (R)	30	6	7	17	29	59	−30	19	Relegation to 2. Oberliga Südwest

Source: RSSSF.com
Rules for classification: 1) Points;
(R) Relegated

== Oberliga Süd ==
The 1959–60 season saw two new clubs in the league, Stuttgarter Kickers and FC Bayern Hof, both promoted from the 2. Oberliga Süd. The league's top scorer was Heinz Strehl of 1. FC Nürnberg with 30 goals.

Pos	Team	Pld	W	D	L	GF	GA	GD	Pts	Promotion, qualification or relegation
1	Karlsruher SC	30	20	5	5	78	39	+39	45	Qualification to German championship
2	Kickers Offenbach	30	17	5	8	75	45	+30	39	Qualification to German championship
3	Eintracht Frankfurt	30	17	4	9	81	57	+24	38	
4	TSV 1860 München	30	16	5	9	65	56	+9	37	
5	FC Bayern Munich	30	14	7	9	81	55	+26	35	
6	1. FC Nürnberg	30	15	4	11	73	54	+19	34	
7	VfB Stuttgart	30	13	7	10	66	57	+9	33	
8	SSV Reutlingen	30	12	7	11	55	57	−2	31	
9	FSV Frankfurt	30	11	6	13	59	53	+6	28	
10	VfR Mannheim	30	11	5	14	55	52	+3	27	
11	SpVgg Fürth	30	10	6	14	48	59	−11	26	
12	FC Schweinfurt 05	30	10	5	15	48	64	−16	25	
13	FC Bayern Hof	30	10	5	15	45	84	−39	25	
14	TSG Ulm 1846	30	8	5	17	39	64	−25	21	
15	Viktoria Aschaffenburg (R)	30	7	7	16	43	73	−30	21	Relegation to 2. Oberliga Süd
16	Stuttgarter Kickers (R)	30	5	5	20	38	80	−42	15	Relegation to 2. Oberliga Süd

Source: RSSSF.com
Rules for classification: 1) Points;
(R) Relegated

== German championship ==
The 1960 German football championship was contested by the nine qualified Oberliga teams and won by Hamburger SV, defeating 1. FC Köln in the final. The runners-up of the Oberliga West and Süd played a pre-qualifying match. The remaining eight clubs then played a home-and-away round in two groups of four. The two group winners then advanced to the final.

=== Qualifying ===
Team 1	Score	Team 2
Westfalia Herne	1–0	Kickers Offenbach

=== Group 1 ===
Pos	Team	Pld	W	D	L	GF	GA	GD	Pts	Promotion, qualification or relegation
1	Hamburger SV (Q)	6	4	1	1	22	11	+11	9	Qualified to final
2	Karlsruher SC	6	2	3	1	18	18	0	7	
3	Borussia Neunkirchen	6	2	1	3	9	17	−8	5	
4	Westfalia Herne	6	1	1	4	13	16	−3	3	

Source: RSSSF.com
Rules for classification: 1) Points;
(Q) Qualified for the phase indicated

=== Group 2 ===
Pos	Team	Pld	W	D	L	GF	GA	GD	Pts	Promotion, qualification or relegation
1	1. FC Köln (Q)	6	4	1	1	14	8	+6	9	Qualified to final
2	Werder Bremen	6	4	0	2	18	12	+6	8	
3	Tasmania 1900 Berlin	6	3	0	3	11	11	0	6	
4	FK Pirmasens	6	0	1	5	9	21	−12	1	

Source: RSSSF.com
Rules for classification: 1) Points;
(Q) Qualified for the phase indicated

=== Final ===
Team 1	Score	Team 2
Hamburger SV	3–2	1. FC Köln
