= Football at the 1960 Summer Olympics – Men's Asian Qualifiers =

Tournament details
- Dates: 27 August 1959 – 30 April 1960
- Teams: 7

Tournament statistics
- Matches played: 9
- Goals scored: 29 (3.22 per match)

The Asian section of the 1960 Summer Olympics – Men's Football Qualifiers acted as qualifiers for the 1960 Summer Olympics football tournament, held in Italy, for national teams that are members of Asia.

== Entrants ==
Eight national teams initially entered qualification, but Australia withdrew, leaving seven teams entering qualification.

Entered qualification	Withdrew before playing
Afghanistan; India; Indonesia; Japan; South Korea; Taiwan; Thailand	Australia

== Format ==
- First round: Eight teams played home-and-away over two legs. The four winners advanced to the second round.
- Second round: Four teams from the first round played home-and-away over two legs. The two winners qualified for the Summer Olympics.

== First round ==
Team 1	Agg.	Team 2	1st leg	2nd leg
Australia	w/o (Note: The tie was awarded to Indonesia, as Australia withdrew due to expensive travels.)	Indonesia	—	—
Afghanistan	w/o (Note: The tie was awarded to India, as Afghanistan withdrew prior to the second leg.)	India	2–5	—
Thailand	2–6	Taiwan	1–3	1–3
Japan	1–2	South Korea	0–2	1–0

== Second round ==
Team 1	Agg.	Team 2	1st leg	2nd leg
India	6–2	Indonesia	4–2	2–0
Taiwan	2–2	South Korea	1–2	1–0 (Note: The tie was awarded to Taiwan, due to South Korea being disqualified as the second leg being abandoned at 23rd minute, with Taiwan winning 1–0, as South Korea players attacked referee John Petrie after he awarded a penalty to Taiwan.)

== Qualified teams ==
The following two teams from the Asian qualified for the final tournament.

Team	Qualified as	Qualified on	Previous appearances in the Summer Olympics
Taiwan	Second round winners	30 April 1960	2 (1936, 1936)
India	Second round runners-up	30 April 1960	2 (1948, 1956)
