= Örn Steinsen =

Icelandic footballer (1940–2022)

Personal information
- Date of birth: 11 January 1940 (age 86)
- Place of birth: Vesturbær, Iceland
- Date of death: 1 July 2022 (aged 82)
- Place of death: Fossvogur, Iceland

Senior career*
Years	Team	Apps	(Gls)
- KR

International career
1959–1961	Iceland	8	(1)
- * Club domestic league appearances and goals

Örn Steinsen (11 January 1940 – 1 July 2022) was an Icelandic footballer. He played for KR, winning the Icelandic championship with KR four times and the Icelandic cup three times, before he retired at the age of 24. He was part of the Iceland national team between 1959 and 1961, making eight appearances and scoring one goal. Steinsen was born in Vesturbær on 11 January 1940 and died in Fossvogur on 1 July 2022, at the age of 82.

== See also ==
- List of Iceland international footballers
