= Jan Gawroński =

Polish footballer

Personal information
- Full name: Jan Feliks Gawroński
- Date of birth: 9 June 1933
- Place of birth: Otwock, Poland
- Date of death: 11 December 2023 (aged 90)
- Place of death: Otwock, Poland
- Height: 1.78 m (5 ft 10 in)
- Position: Forward

Senior career*
Years	Team	Apps	(Gls)
1948–1952	Start Otwock		
1952–1953	Kolejarz-Polonia Warsaw		
1953–1954	CWKS Warsaw		
1955	CWKS Bydgoszcz		
1956–1966	Gwardia Warsaw		

International career
1957–1959	Poland	3	(1)
- * Club domestic league appearances and goals

Jan Feliks Gawroński (9 June 1933 — 11 December 2023) was a Polish footballer who played as a forward. He played in three matches for the Poland national team from 1957 to 1959.
