= Zbigniew Szarzyński =

Polish footballer (1933–2018)

Personal information
- Date of birth: 7 December 1933
- Place of birth: Lwów, Poland
- Date of death: 17 June 2018 (aged 84)
- Height: 1.72 m (5 ft 8 in)
- Position: Forward

Senior career*
Years	Team	Apps	(Gls)
- Polonia Bytom
- Gwardia Warsaw

International career
1957–1965	Poland	6	(3)
- * Club domestic league appearances and goals

Zbigniew Marian Szarzyński (7 December 1933 – 17 June 2018) was a Polish footballer who played as a forward.

Szarzyński made six appearances for the Poland national team from 1957 to 1965.

Szarzyński died on 17 June 2018, at the age of 84.
