= Oskar Kohlhauser =

Austrian footballer (1934–2019)

Personal information
- Date of birth: 22 December 1934
- Date of death: 9 June 2019 (aged 84)

International career
Years	Team	Apps	(Gls)
1956–1962	Austria	3	(0)

Oskar Kohlhauser (22 December 1934 – 9 June 2019) was an Austrian footballer. He played in three matches for the Austria national football team from 1956 to 1962.
