= Football at the 1960 Summer Olympics – Men's European Qualifiers – Group 4 =

The 1960 Summer Olympics football qualification – Europe Group 4 was one of the seven European groups in the Summer Olympics football qualification tournament to decide which teams would qualify for the Football at the 1960 Summer Olympics finals tournament in Italy. Group 4 consisted of three teams: Yugoslavia, Israel and Greece. The teams played against each other home-and-away in a round-robin format. The group winners, Bulgaria, qualified directly for the Summer Olympics football finals.

== Standings ==
Pos	Team	Pld	W	D	L	GF	GA	GD	Pts	Qualification	Yugoslavia	Israel	Greece
1	Yugoslavia	4	2	1	1	12	4	+8	5	Qualification for 1960 Summer Olympics	—	1–2	4–0
2	Israel	4	2	1	1	7	6	+1	5		2–2	—	2–1
3	Greece	4	1	0	3	3	12	−9	2		0–5	2–1	—

Source: RSSSF

== Matches ==
21 October 1959
15:00 UTC+2

Israel	2–2	Yugoslavia
Stelmach 64', 73'	Report	Kostić 7', 76'

Ramat Gan Stadium, Ramat Gan
Attendance: 40,000
Referee: Orhan Gönül (Turkey)

15 November 1959
14:00 UTC+1

Yugoslavia	4–0	Greece
Mujić 31', 43'; Mihajlović 45'; Kostić 78'	Report

Stadion Jugoslovenska Narodna Armija, Belgrade
Attendance: 25,000
Referee: Viktor Schicker (Switzerland)

6 March 1960
15:15 UTC+2

Israel	2–1	Greece
Menchel 50'; Glazer 87'	Report	Linoxilakis 6'

Ramat Gan Stadium, Ramat Gan
Attendance: 45,000
Referee: Davoud Nassiri (Iran)

3 April 1960
16:00 UTC+1

Greece	2–1	Israel
Serafidis 66', 80'	Report	Glazer 60'

Leoforos Alexandras Stadium, Athens
Attendance: 18,000
Referee: Francesco Liverani (Italy)

10 April 1960
15:45 UTC+1

Yugoslavia	1–2	Israel
Mujić 33'	Report	Levi 2', 67'

Stadion Jugoslovenska Narodna Armija, Belgrade
Attendance: 35,000
Referee: Friedrich Seipelt (Austria)

24 April 1960
16:00 UTC+2

Greece	0–5	Yugoslavia
	Report	Kostić 36'; Žanetić 67'; Takač 69'; Galić 81'; Knez 83'

Leoforos Alexandras Stadium, Athens
Attendance: 20,000
Referee: Dimitar Rumenchev (Bulgaria)

== Goalscorers ==
There were 22 goals scored in 6 matches, for an average of 3.67 goals per match.

4 goals

- (Yugoslavia national football team) Bora Kostić

3 goals

- (Yugoslavia national football team) Muhamed Mujić

2 goals

- (Greece national football team) Lambis Serafidis
- (Israel national football team) Yehoshua Glazer
- (Israel national football team) Rafi Levi
- (Israel national football team) Nahum Stelmach

1 goal

- (Greece national football team) Kostas Linoxilakis
- (Israel national football team) Avraham Menchel
- (Yugoslavia national football team) Branislav Mihajlović
- (Yugoslavia national football team) Ante Žanetić
- (Yugoslavia national football team) Silvester Takač
- (Yugoslavia national football team) Milan Galić
- (Yugoslavia national football team) Tomislav Knez
