= Football at the 1960 Summer Olympics – Men's European Qualifiers – Group 3 =

The 1960 Summer Olympics football qualification – Europe Group 3 was one of the seven European groups in the Summer Olympics football qualification tournament to decide which teams would qualify for the Football at the 1960 Summer Olympics finals tournament in Italy. Group 3 consisted of three teams: Bulgaria, Soviet Union and Romania. The teams played against each other home-and-away in a round-robin format. The group winners, Bulgaria, qualified directly for the Summer Olympics football finals.

== Standings ==
Pos	Team	Pld	W	D	L	GF	GA	GD	Pts	Qualification	Bulgaria	Soviet Union	Romania
1	Bulgaria	4	2	1	1	4	3	+1	5	Qualification for 1960 Summer Olympics	—	1–0	2–1
2	Soviet Union	4	1	2	1	3	2	+1	4		1–1	—	2–0
3	Romania	4	1	1	2	2	4	−2	3		1–0	0–0	—

Source: RSSSF

== Matches ==
27 June 1959

Soviet Union	1–1	Bulgaria
Korolenkov 68'	Report	Milanov 26'

Lenin Central Stadium, Moscow
Attendance: 102,000
Referee: Bengt Lundell (Sweden)

19 July 1959

Soviet Union	2–0	Romania
Urin 11'; Metreveli 61'	Report

Lenin Central Stadium, Moscow

2 August 1959

Romania	0–0	Soviet Union
	Report

13 September 1959

Bulgaria	1–0	Soviet Union
Kolev 11'	Report

Vasil Levski National Stadium, Sofia
Attendance: 45,000
Referee: Josef Stoll (Austria)

8 November 1959

Romania	1–0	Bulgaria
Constantin 80'	Report

Stadionul 23 August, Bucharest
Attendance: 80,000
Referee: János Pósa (Hungary)

1 May 1960

Bulgaria	2–1	Romania
Yordanov 2'; Kovachev 20'	Report	Tătaru 66'

Vasil Levski National Stadium, Sofia
Attendance: 55,000
Referee: Petros Tzouvaras (Greece)

== Goalscorers ==
There were 9 goals scored in 6 matches, for an average of 1.5 goals per match.

1 goal

- (Bulgaria national football team) Ivan Kolev
- (Bulgaria national football team) Nikola Kovachev
- (Bulgaria national football team) Dimitar Milanov
- (Bulgaria national football team) Dimitar Yordanov
- (Romania Olympic football team) Gheorghe Constantin
- (Romania Olympic football team) Nicolae Tătaru
- (Soviet Union Olympic football team) Valery Korolenkov
- (Soviet Union Olympic football team) Slava Metreveli
- (Soviet Union Olympic football team) Valeri Urin
