= Sveinn Teitsson =

Icelandic footballer (1931–2017)

Personal information
- Date of birth: 1 March 1931
- Place of birth: Akranes, Iceland
- Date of death: 4 March 2017 (aged 86)
- Position: Defender

Senior career*
Years	Team	Apps	(Gls)
- ÍA

International career
1953–1964	Iceland	23	(2)
- * Club domestic league appearances and goals

Sveinn Teitsson (1 March 1931 – 4 March 2017) was an Icelandic footballer who played as a defender for ÍA. He made 23 appearances for the Iceland national team from 1953 to 1964.
