= Football at the 1960 Summer Olympics – Men's European Qualifiers =

Men's European Qualifiers
Tournament details
- Teams: 22 (from 1 confederation)

Tournament statistics
- Matches played: 44
- Goals scored: 145 (3.3 per match)
- Top scorer(s): Flórián Albert; Ernest Pohl; 5 goals

The Men's European Football Qualifiers for the 1960 Summer Olympics consisted of two stages, the first single elimination tournament and then group stage.

== Preliminary round ==
The IOC's rules allowed only one German team to enter. After talks for a Unified Team broke down, the football federations and NOCs of West and East Germany agreed to organise a play-off between their teams. Both matches were agreed to be played without spectators, and the sites of the games were announced at short notice.

Team 1	Agg.	Team 2	1st leg	2nd leg
East Germany	1–4	West Germany	0–2	1–2

West Germany win 4–1 on aggregate.

== First round ==
=== Groups ===
==== Group 1 ====
Pos	Team	Pld	W	D	L	GF	GA	GD	Pts	Qualification	Denmark	Iceland	Norway
1	Denmark	4	3	1	0	11	6	+5	7	Qualification for 1960 Summer Olympics	—	1–1	2–1
2	Iceland	4	1	1	2	5	7	−2	3		2–4	—	1–0
3	Norway	4	1	0	3	5	8	−3	2		2–4	2–1	—

Source: RSSSF

==== Group 2 ====
Pos	Team	Pld	W	D	L	GF	GA	GD	Pts	Qualification	Poland	Germany	Finland
1	Poland	4	4	0	0	15	4	+11	8	Qualification for 1960 Summer Olympics	—	3–1	6–2
2	West Germany	4	1	0	3	5	10	−5	2		0–3	—	2–1
3	Finland	4	1	0	3	7	13	−6	2		1–3	3–2	—

Source: RSSSF

==== Group 3 ====
Pos	Team	Pld	W	D	L	GF	GA	GD	Pts	Qualification	Bulgaria	Soviet Union	Romania
1	Bulgaria	4	2	1	1	4	3	+1	5	Qualification for 1960 Summer Olympics	—	1–0	2–1
2	Soviet Union	4	1	2	1	3	2	+1	4		1–1	—	2–0
3	Romania	4	1	1	2	2	4	−2	3		1–0	0–0	—

Source: RSSSF

==== Group 4 ====
Pos	Team	Pld	W	D	L	GF	GA	GD	Pts	Qualification	Yugoslavia	Israel	Greece
1	Yugoslavia	4	2	1	1	12	4	+8	5	Qualification for 1960 Summer Olympics	—	1–2	4–0
2	Israel	4	2	1	1	7	6	+1	5		2–2	—	2–1
3	Greece	4	1	0	3	3	12	−9	2		0–5	2–1	—

Source: RSSSF

==== Group 5 ====
Pos	Team	Pld	W	D	L	GF	GA	GD	Pts	Qualification	United Kingdom	Ireland	Netherlands
1	Great Britain	4	3	1	0	13	6	+7	7	Qualification for 1960 Summer Olympics	—	3–2	2–2
2	Republic of Ireland	4	1	1	2	9	9	0	3		1–3	—	6–3
3	Netherlands	4	0	2	2	6	13	−7	2		1–5	0–0	—

Source: RSSSF

==== Group 6 ====
Pos	Team	Pld	W	D	L	GF	GA	GD	Pts	Qualification	France	Luxembourg	Switzerland
1	France	4	3	0	1	7	6	+1	6	Qualification for 1960 Summer Olympics	—	1–0	1–0
2	Luxembourg	4	1	2	1	7	6	+1	4		5–3	—	0–0
3	Switzerland	4	0	2	2	3	5	−2	2		1–2	2–2	—

Source: RSSSF

==== Group 7 ====
Pos	Team	Pld	W	D	L	GF	GA	GD	Pts	Qualification	Hungary	Czech Republic	Austria
1	Hungary	4	4	0	0	10	3	+7	8	Qualification for 1960 Summer Olympics	—	2–1	2–1
2	Czechoslovakia	4	1	1	2	4	5	−1	3		1–2	—	2–1
3	Austria	4	0	1	3	2	8	−6	1		0–4	0–0	—

Source: RSSSF
