= 1962–63 DFB-Pokal =

Tournament details
- Country: West Germany
- Teams: 16

Final positions
- Champions: Hamburg
- Runners-up: Borussia Dortmund

Tournament statistics
- Matches played: 16

The 1962–63 DFB-Pokal was the 20th season of the annual German football cup competition. It began on 1 June 1963 and ended on 14 August 1963. 16 teams competed in the tournament of four rounds. In the final Hamburg defeated Borussia Dortmund 3–0.

== Matches ==
=== Round of 16 ===
1 June 1963
KSV Hessen Kassel	2 – 2	Wuppertaler SV	(AET)
1. FC Saarbrücken	3 – 0	VfL Wolfsburg
Concordia Hamburg	1 – 3	Tasmania 1900 Berlin
FC Bayern Hof	2 – 5	Hamburger SV
SV Werder Bremen	4 – 3	VfB Lohberg
Borussia Dortmund	4 – 2	Sportfreunde Saarbrücken
TSV 1860 Munich	3 – 2	FC Schalke 04
1. FC Nürnberg	1 – 2	Borussia Neunkirchen

==== Replay ====
8 June 1963
Wuppertaler SV	3 – 0	KSV Hessen Kassel

=== Quarter-finals ===
31 July 1963
Borussia Dortmund	3 – 1	TSV 1860 Munich
Hamburger SV	1 – 0	1. FC Saarbrücken
Wuppertaler SV	1 – 0	Borussia Neunkirchen
SV Werder Bremen	1 – 0	Tasmania 1900 Berlin

=== Semi-finals ===
8 August 1963
Borussia Dortmund	2 – 0	SV Werder Bremen
Wuppertaler SV	0 – 1	Hamburger SV

=== Final ===
14 August 1963
17:30 CET

Borussia Dortmund	0–3	Hamburger SV
	Report	U. Seeler 31', 33', 84'

Niedersachsenstadion, Hanover
Attendance: 68,000
Referee: Rudolf Kreitlein (Stuttgart)
