= Uwe Seeler =

German footballer (1936–2022)

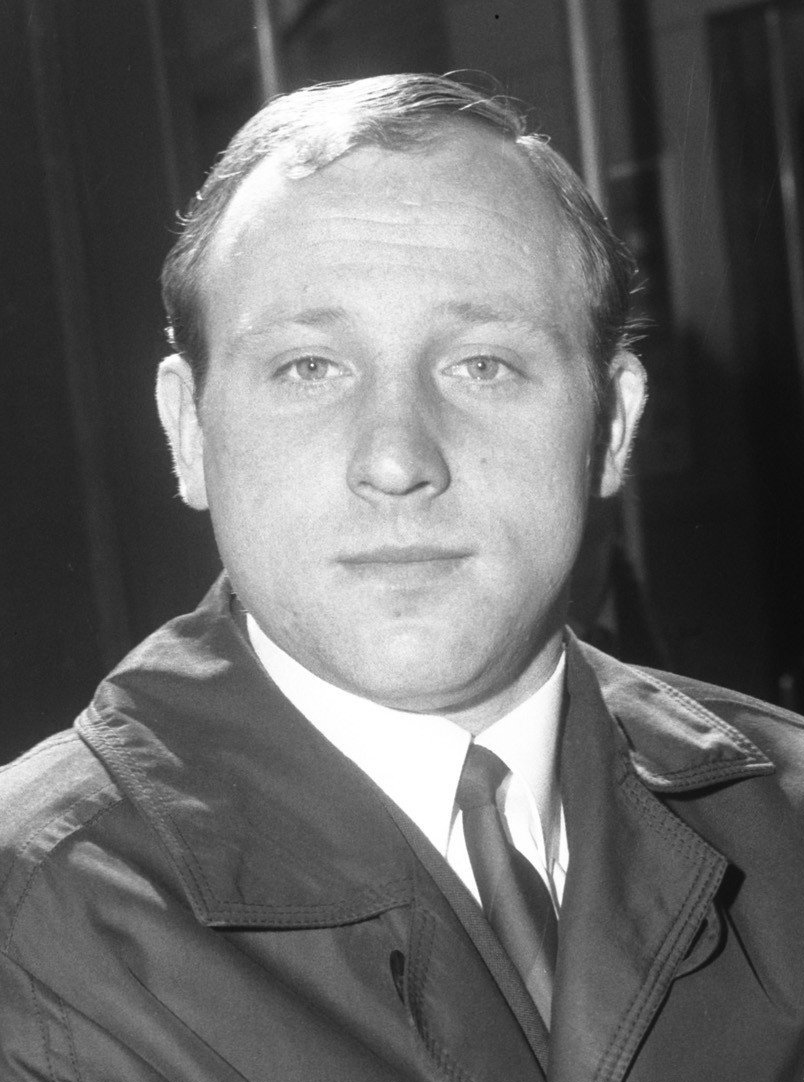
- Seeler in 1966

Personal information
- Date of birth: 5 November 1936
- Place of birth: Hamburg, Germany
- Date of death: 21 July 2022 (aged 85)
- Place of death: Norderstedt, Germany
- Height: 1.70 m (5 ft 7 in)
- Position: Striker

Youth career
- 1946–1953: Hamburger SV

Senior career*
Years	Team	Apps	(Gls)
1953–1972	Hamburger SV	476	(404)
1978	Cork Celtic	1	(2)
Total		477	(406)

International career
1953–1954	West Germany U-18	10	(15)
1954–1970	West Germany	72	(43)
Medal record
Men's football
Representing West Germany
FIFA World Cup
Runner-up	1966 England
Third place	1970 Mexico
- * Club domestic league appearances and goals

Uwe Seeler (German pronunciation: [ˈuːvə ˈzeːlɐ]; 5 November 1936 – 21 July 2022) was a German footballer and football official. As a striker, he was a prolific scorer for Hamburger SV and also made 72 appearances for the West Germany national team. Widely regarded as one of the greatest players in German football history, Seeler was named one of FIFA's 100 greatest living players by Pelé in 2004. He was the first football player to be awarded the Commander's Cross of the Order of Merit of the Federal Republic of Germany.

== Playing career ==
=== Club career ===
Seeler followed in his father's footsteps as a player for Hamburger SV, making his first team debut in 1954 in a DFB-Pokal match, aged just under 18, scoring four goals (8–2 vs. Holstein Kiel). In later years, despite tempting offers from Italian and Spanish clubs, he remained loyal to Hamburg, working on a second career as a merchant besides playing football.

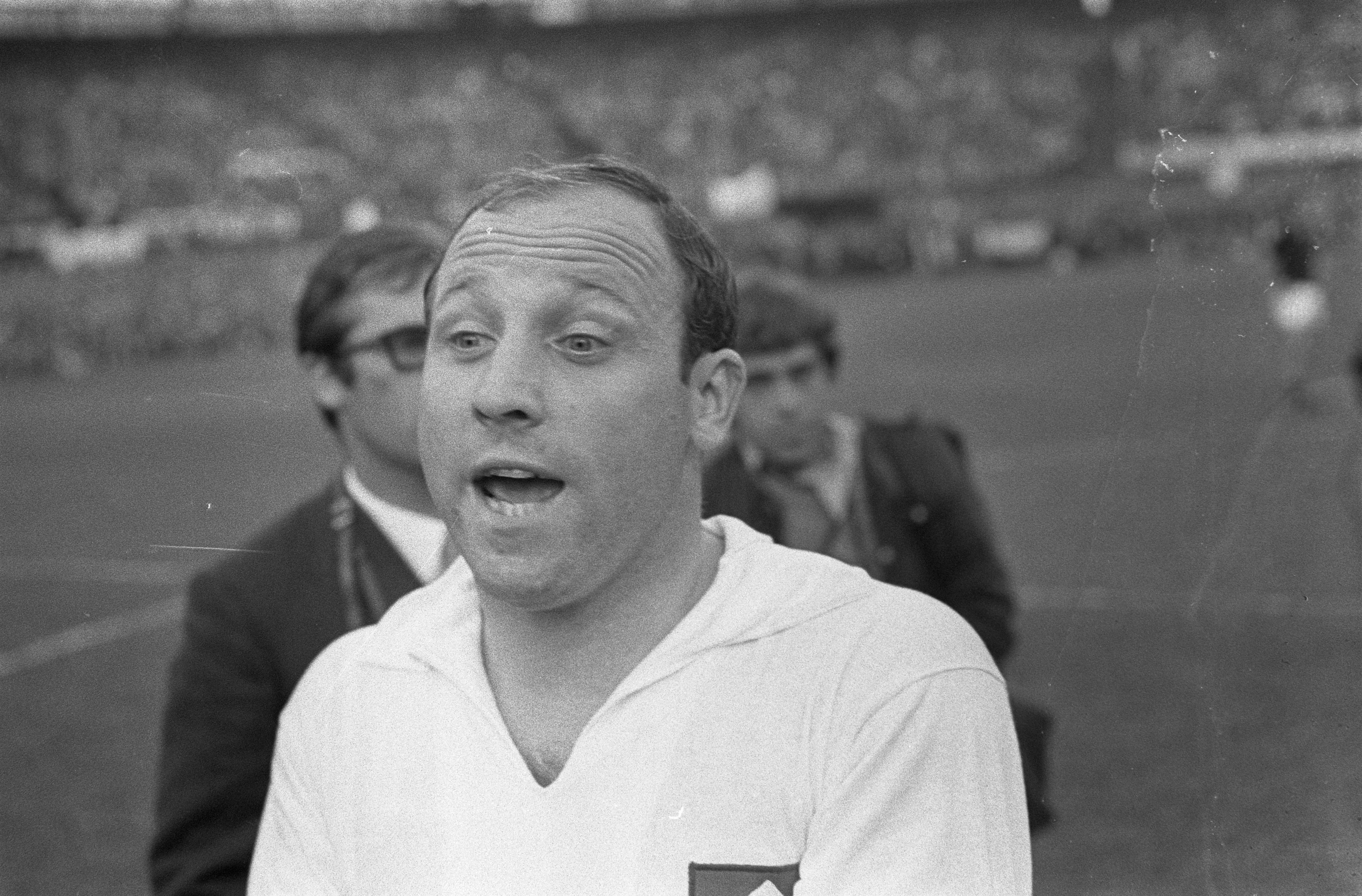
Seeler with Hamburger SV in 1968

Seeler was a gifted, powerful, and prolific striker who, among other things, was most of all renowned for his leadership, consistency, overhead kicks, and aerial ability. He scored 137 times in 239 Bundesliga games, 43 times in 72 international games for the German national team, and 21 times in 29 European club tournament games. He was captain of both his club team and the national team for many years. He and his club won the German championship in 1960 and the DFB-Pokal in 1963. He was top scorer of the first Bundesliga season in 1963–64 and German Footballer of the Year in 1960, 1964, and 1970. During the 1960–61 season, Seeler, alongside his brother Dieter, helped to lead Hamburger SV to the semi-finals of the European Cup, where they narrowly missed out on the final against Benfica, losing out to Barcelona in a play-off match. During the 1967–68 season, Seeler also helped Hamburg to reach the final of the European Cup Winners' Cup, finishing the competition as top scorer, only to lose out to AC Milan.

In 1978, he and his former teammate Franz-Josef Hönig played for Cork Celtic in a one-off sponsored event. Seeler had ended his active playing career in 1972. However, this match turned out to be an official League of Ireland one and Uwe scored twice. Thus, his overall record of goals scored in league and championship matches adds up to 446 (Hamburger SV 444, Cork Celtic 2). His 404 goals in German Oberliga and Bundesliga league games is a record that stands as of today, his 406 goals in league games overall making him the second-best German goalscorer behind Gerd Müller.

=== International career ===
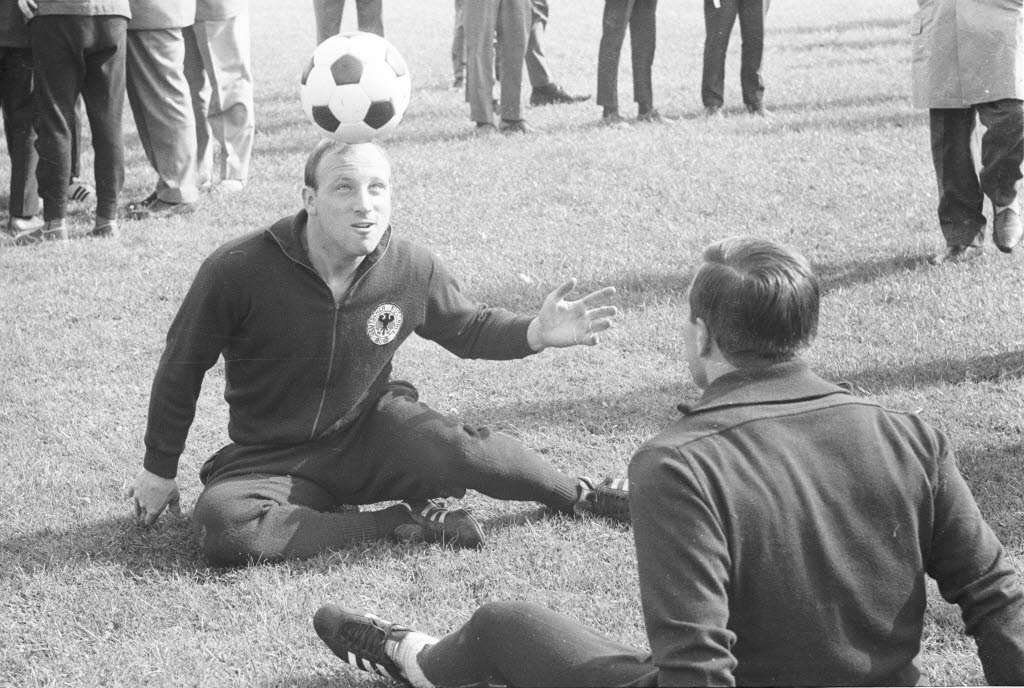
Seeler at the national team's training camp in 1965.

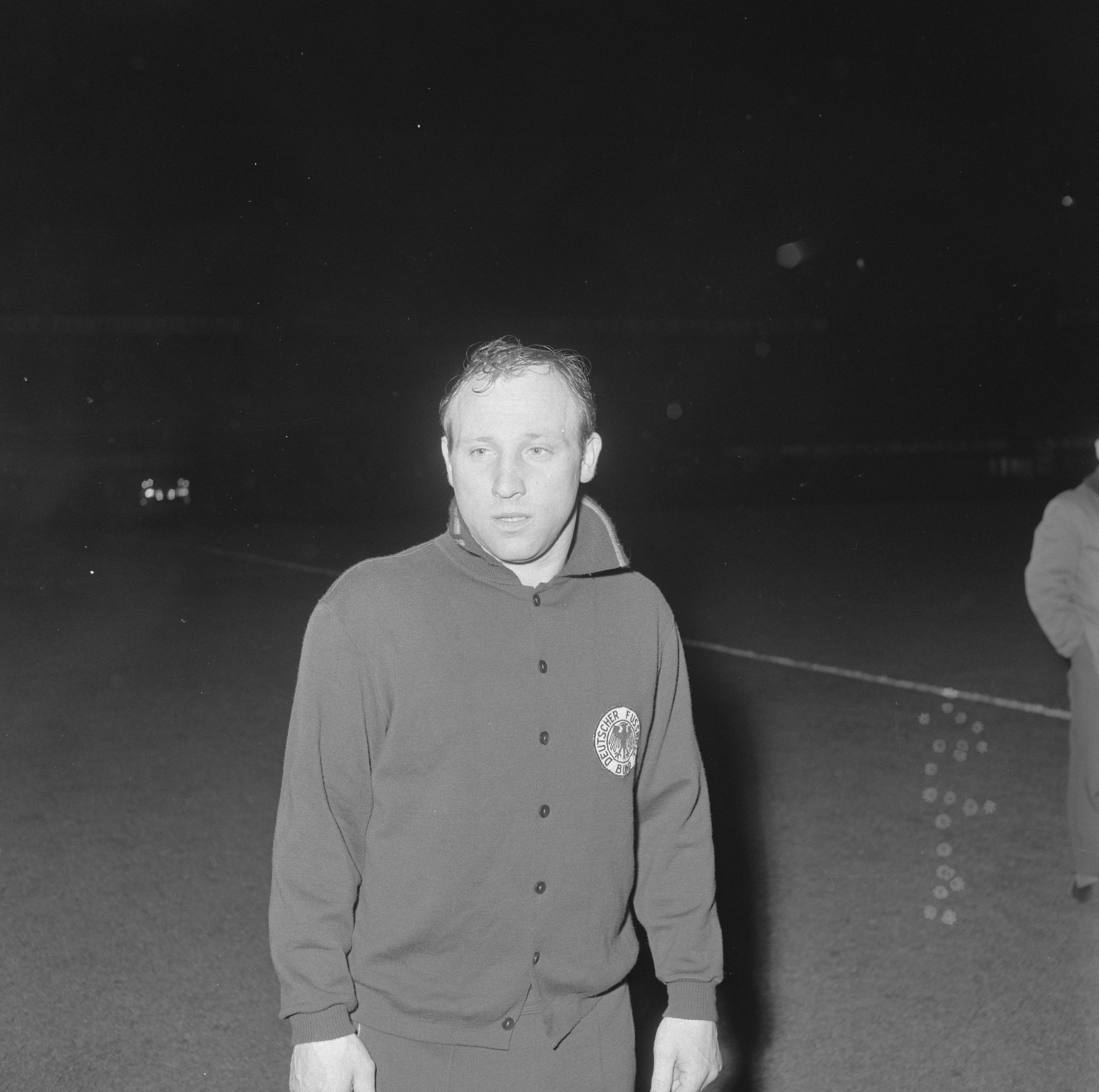
Seeler in Rotterdam after West Germany's friendly match against the Netherlands in 1966.

Seeler participated in the same four FIFA World Cups as Pelé did: 1958, 1962, 1966, and 1970. Of those West German World Cup teams, the 1966 side reached the final, where they lost to host nation England 4–2 in extra time. In 1958, the German team finished in fourth place; in 1970 the West German team finished in third after being eliminated by European rivals Italy in the semi-finals, following a closely fought 4–3 extra-time loss, a match often referred to as the "Game of the Century". In the previous round, a backward second-half header against England tied the score 2–2, a game West Germany went on to win 3–2.

Although Seeler never won a World Cup (his involvement as a player in the tournament started four years after West Germany won their first World Cup (1954) and ended four years before they won their second (1974)), he had a prolific career in the tournament; he was the first player ever to appear in 20 World Cup matches (he retired with 21 matches played, tied for third all-time); the first ever to score in four World Cups (beating Pelé by only a few minutes), and the first player to score at least two goals in each of four World Cups (matched in 2014 by his compatriot Miroslav Klose). He has 1,980 all-time minutes played in World Cups. In total, he scored nine goals across the four World Cups in which he played, as well as three goals in World Cup Qualifying matches; he scored 43 times in 72 international appearances between 1954 and 1970. A photo by Sven Simon of a dejected Seeler leaving the field after the 1966 World Cup final is famous in Germany, and was voted as Photo of the Century by kicker magazine.

== Career after football ==
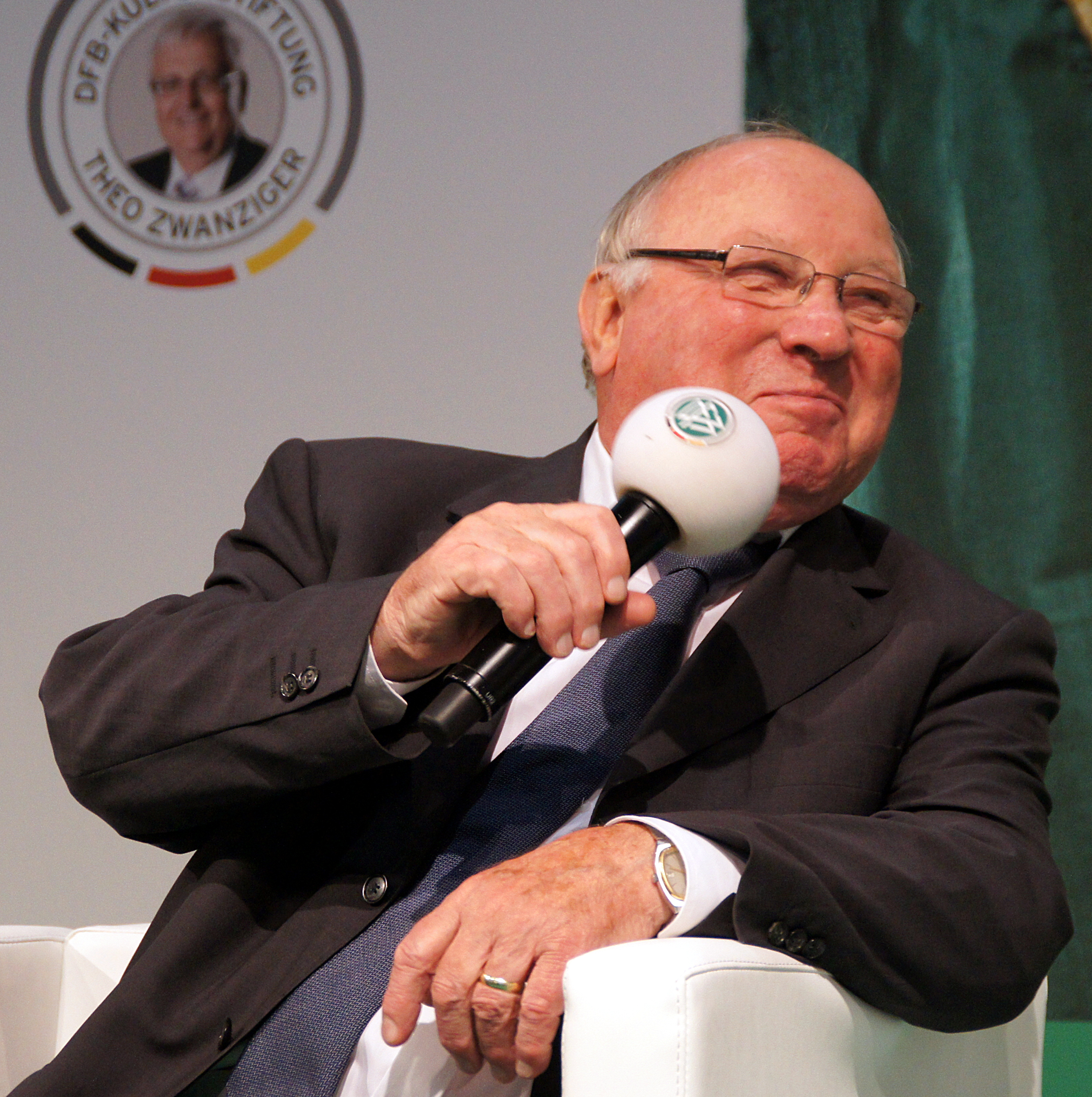
Seeler giving an interview at the Frankfurt Book Fair in 2013

He had a two-and-a-half-year tenure as president of Hamburger SV, which began in 1995, and ended in resignation in 1998 due to a financial scandal, for which he took responsibility. Seeler, however, was not himself implicated in the irregularities.

== Recognition ==
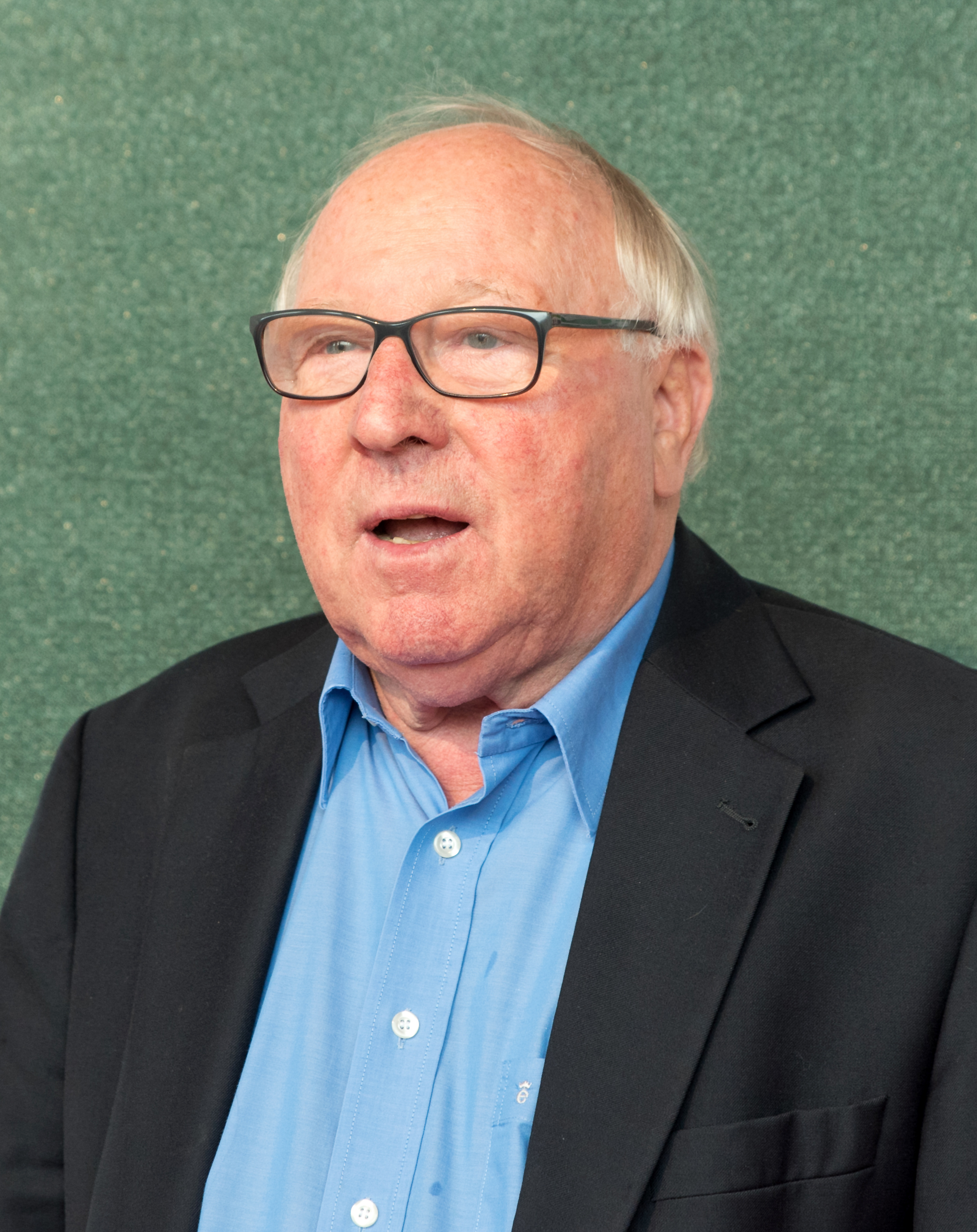
Seeler in 2016

Seeler was a tremendously popular player due to his fairness and modesty and is still widely called Uns Uwe (West Low German: Our Uwe) in Hamburg and the surrounding area. The DFB (German FA) made him the second honorary captain of the German national team in 1972 (the first being Fritz Walter). In 2003, he became an honorary citizen of his hometown Hamburg; the first time the honor was bestowed on a sportsman. That year he also published his memoirs Danke, Fußball ("Thank you, football"). 2005 saw the unveiling of a giant monument in front of the Hamburger SV stadium depicting his right foot.

== Film appearances ==
Seeler appeared in a cameo role in the popular 1972 Heinz Erhardt comedy Willi wird das Kind schon schaukeln (English title: Willi Manages the Whole Thing), playing himself.

== Personal life ==
From 1959 until his death, Seeler lived with his wife in Harksheide, today a district of Norderstedt in the Hamburg Metropolitan Region. He was Protestant.

Seeler's grandson, Levin Öztunalı, is also a professional footballer.

== Death ==
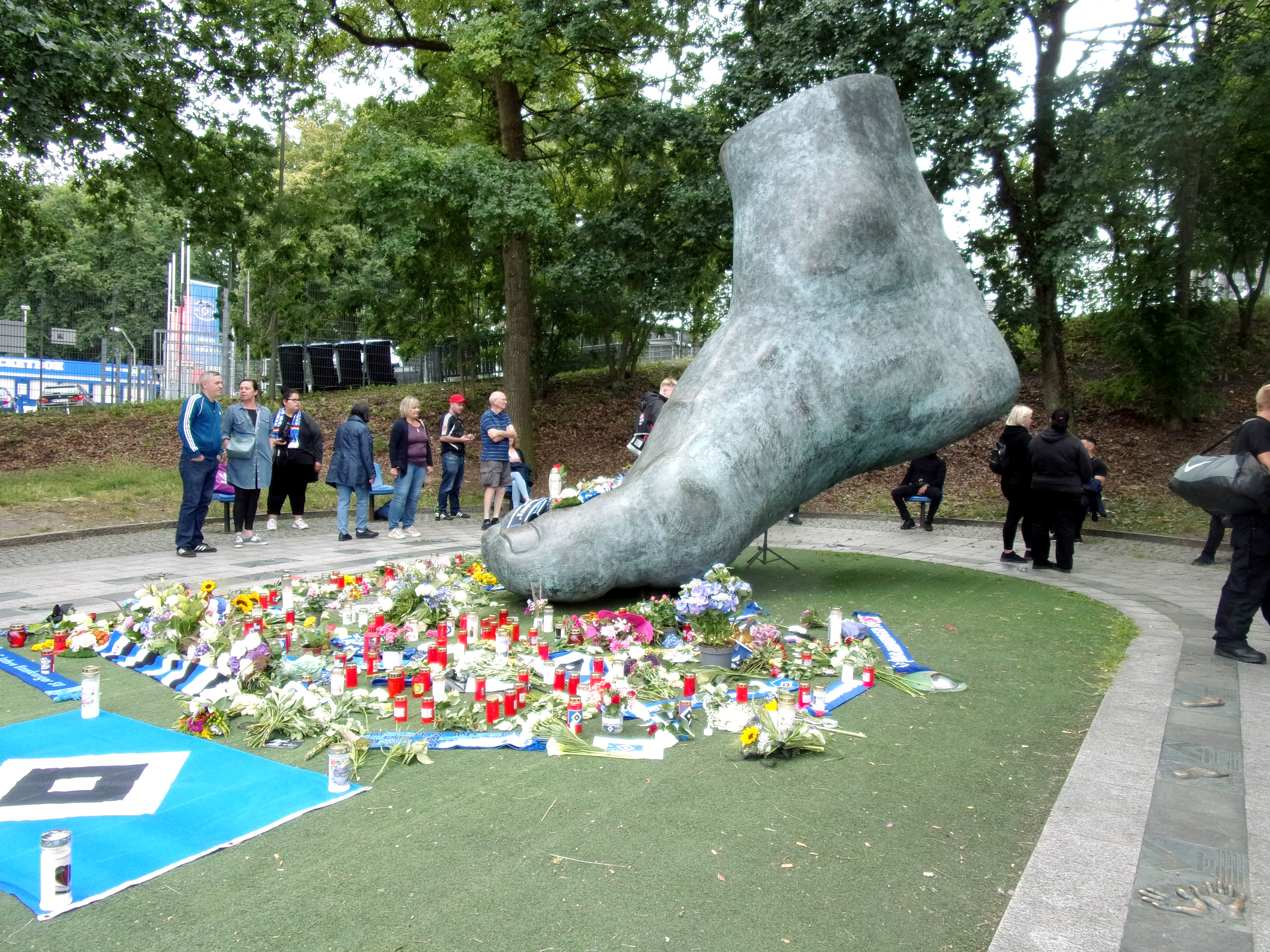
HSV supporters pay tribute to Seeler with flowers at his foot monument the day after his passing.

Seeler died on 21 July 2022, aged 85, in his home in Norderstedt. He was honoured later in the day with a moment of silence before the UEFA Women's Euro 2022 quarter-final between Germany and Austria. The following second matchday of the 2. Bundesliga, where Hamburg played a home match against Hansa Rostock, as well as the first round of the DFB-Pokal also began with a minute of silence in Seeler's tribute.

The Bundesliga home game of HSV featured supporters dressed in black displaying a banner reading "loyal and modest – the greatest of all time" ("Loyal und bescheiden - der Größte aller Zeiten") in honor of Seeler's club career.

== Career statistics ==
=== Club ===
Appearances and goals by club, season and competition
Club	Season	League			German Championship (Note: Before the Bundesliga, the national champion was determined in a series of knock-out games after the domestic league ended.)		DFB-Pokal		Europe		Total	
Club	Season	Division	Apps	Goals	Apps	Goals	Apps	Goals	Apps	Goals	Apps	Goals
Hamburger SV	1954–55	Oberliga Nord	26	28	5	1	1	2	–		32	31
Hamburger SV	1955–56	Oberliga Nord	29	32	5	4	2	2	–		36	37
Hamburger SV	1956–57	Oberliga Nord	26	31	4	2	1	0	–		31	33
Hamburger SV	1957–58	Oberliga Nord	24	22	4	2	–		–		28	26
Hamburger SV	1958–59	Oberliga Nord	27	29	4	5	1	0	–		32	34
Hamburger SV	1959–60	Oberliga Nord	26	36	7	13	1	0	–		34	49
Hamburger SV	1960–61	Oberliga Nord	23	29	6	8	–		7 (Note: Appearances in European Cup)	5	36	42
Hamburger SV	1961–62	Oberliga Nord	28	28	2	4	–		–		30	32
Hamburger SV	1962–63	Oberliga Nord	28	32	6	2	4	6	–		38	40
Hamburger SV	1963–64	Bundesliga	30	30	–		2	2	6 (Note: Appearances in European Cup Winners' Cup)	5	38	37
Hamburger SV	1964–65	Bundesliga	19	14	–		1	1	–		20	15
Hamburger SV	1965–66	Bundesliga	23	11	–		2	1	–		25	12
Hamburger SV	1966–67	Bundesliga	23	10	–		5	3	–		28	13
Hamburger SV	1967–68	Bundesliga	30	12	–		1	0	9	8	40	20
Hamburger SV	1968–69	Bundesliga	33	23	–		3	1	4 (Note: Appearances in UEFA Cup)	3	40	27
Hamburger SV	1969–70	Bundesliga	30	17	–		2	0	2	0	34	17
Hamburger SV	1970–71	Bundesliga	25	9	–		2	3	1	0	28	12
Hamburger SV	1971–72	Bundesliga	26	11	–		4	3	–		30	14
Hamburger SV	Total		476	404	43	41	32	24	29	21	580	490
Cork Celtic	1977–78	League of Ireland	1	2	–		–		–		1	2
Career total			477	406	43	41	32	24	29	21	581	492

=== International ===
Appearances and goals by national team and year
National team	Year	Apps	Goals
West Germany	1954	3	0
West Germany	1955	0	0
West Germany	1956	1	0
West Germany	1957	0	0
West Germany	1958	9	5
West Germany	1959	5	6
West Germany	1960	5	4
West Germany	1961	6	5
West Germany	1962	7	2
West Germany	1963	3	3
West Germany	1964	3	4
West Germany	1965	1	1
West Germany	1966	12	7
West Germany	1967	3	1
West Germany	1968	1	0
West Germany	1969	3	0
West Germany	1970	10	5
Total		72	43

Scores and results list West Germany's goal tally first, score column indicates score after each Seeler goal.

List of international goals scored by Uwe Seeler
No.	Date	Venue	Opponent	Score	Result	Competition	Ref.
1	8 June 1958	Malmö Stadion, Malmö, Sweden	Argentina	2-1	3-1	1958 FIFA World Cup	
2	15 June 1958	Malmö Stadion, Malmö, Sweden	Northern Ireland	2-2	2-2	1958 FIFA World Cup	
3	26 October 1958	Stade Yves-du-Manoir, Colombes, France	France	2-2	2-2	Friendly	
4	21 December 1958	Augsburg, West Germany	Bulgaria	1-0	3-0	Friendly	
5	21 December 1958	Augsburg, West Germany	Bulgaria	3-0	3-0	Friendly	
6	6 May 1959	Hampden Park, Glasgow, United Kingdom	Scotland	1-2	2-3	Friendly	
7	21 October 1959	Müngersdorfer Stadion, Cologne, West Germany	Netherlands	3-0	7-0	Friendly	
8	21 October 1959	Müngersdorfer Stadion, Cologne, West Germany	Netherlands	4-0	7-0	Friendly	
9	21 October 1959	Müngersdorfer Stadion, Cologne, West Germany	Netherlands	6-0	7-0	Friendly	
10	8 November 1959	People's Stadium, Budapest, Hungary	Hungary	—	3-4	Friendly	
11	8 November 1959	People's Stadium, Budapest, Hungary	Hungary	—	3-4	Friendly	
12	23 March 1960	Neckarstadion, Stuttgart, West Germany	Chile	2-1	2-1	Friendly	
13	27 April 1960	Südweststadion, Ludwigshafen, West Germany	Portugal	—	2-1	Friendly	
14	3 April 1960	Laugardalsvöllur, Reykjavík, Iceland	Iceland	1-0	5-0	Friendly	
15	26 October 1960	Windsor Park, Belfast, United Kingdom	Northern Ireland	2-2	4-3	1962 FIFA World Cup qualification	
16	20 September 1961	Rheinstadion, Düsseldorf, West Germany	Denmark	—	5-1	Friendly	
17	20 September 1961	Rheinstadion, Düsseldorf, West Germany	Denmark	—	5-1	Friendly	
18	20 September 1961	Rheinstadion, Düsseldorf, West Germany	Denmark	—	5-1	Friendly	
19	22 October 1961	Augsburg, West Germany	Greece	1-0	2-1	1962 FIFA World Cup qualification	
20	22 October 1961	Augsburg, West Germany	Greece	2-0	2-1	1962 FIFA World Cup qualification	
21	3 June 1962	Estadio Nacional, Santiago, Chile	Switzerland	2-0	2-1	1962 FIFA World Cup	
22	6 June 1962	Estadio Nacional, Santiago, Chile	Chile	2-0	2-0	1962 FIFA World Cup	
23	28 September 1963	Waldstadion, Frankfurt, West Germany	Turkey	1-0	3-0	Friendly	
24	28 September 1963	Waldstadion, Frankfurt, West Germany	Turkey	2-0	3-0	Friendly	
25	28 September 1963	Waldstadion, Frankfurt, West Germany	Turkey	3-0	3-0	Friendly	
26	29 April 1964	Südweststadion, Ludwigshafen, West Germany	Czechoslovakia	1-0	3-4	Friendly	
27	29 April 1964	Südweststadion, Ludwigshafen, West Germany	Czechoslovakia	3-4	3-4	Friendly	
28	12 May 1964	Niedersachsenstadion, Hanover, West Germany	Scotland	—	2-2	Friendly	
29	12 May 1964	Niedersachsenstadion, Hanover, West Germany	Scotland	—	2-2	Friendly	
30	26 September 1965	Stockholm, Sweden	Sweden	2-1	2-1	1966 FIFA World Cup qualification	
31	23 March 1966	De Kuip, Rotterdam, Netherlands	Netherlands	1-0	4-2	Friendly	
32	7 May 1966	Windsor Park, Belfast, United Kingdom	Northern Ireland	—	2-0	Friendly	
33	1 June 1966	Waldstadion, Frankfurt, West Germany	Romania	1-0	1-0	Friendly	
34	23 June 1966	Niedersachsenstadion, Hanover, West Germany	Yugoslavia	2-0	2-0	Friendly	
35	20 July 1966	Villa Park, Birmingham, United Kingdom	Spain	2-1	2-1	1966 FIFA World Cup	
36	23 July 1966	Hillsborough Stadium, Sheffield, United Kingdom	Uruguay	3-0	4-0	1966 FIFA World Cup	
37	19 November 1966	Müngersdorfer Stadion, Cologne, West Germany	Norway	—	3-0	Friendly	
38	7 October 1967	Volksparkstadion, Hamburg, West Germany	Yugoslavia	3-1	3-1	UEFA Euro 1968 qualification	
39	9 May 1970	Olympiastadion, West Berlin, West Germany	Republic of Ireland	1-0	2-1	Friendly	
40	13 May 1970	Niedersachsenstadion, Hanover, West Germany	Yugoslavia	1-0	1-0	Friendly	
41	3 June 1970	Estadio León, León, Mexico	Morocco	1-1	2-1	1970 FIFA World Cup	
42	7 June 1970	Estadio León, León, Mexico	Bulgaria	4-1	5-2	1970 FIFA World Cup	
43	14 June 1970	Estadio León, León, Mexico	England	2-2	3-2	1970 FIFA World Cup	

== Honours ==
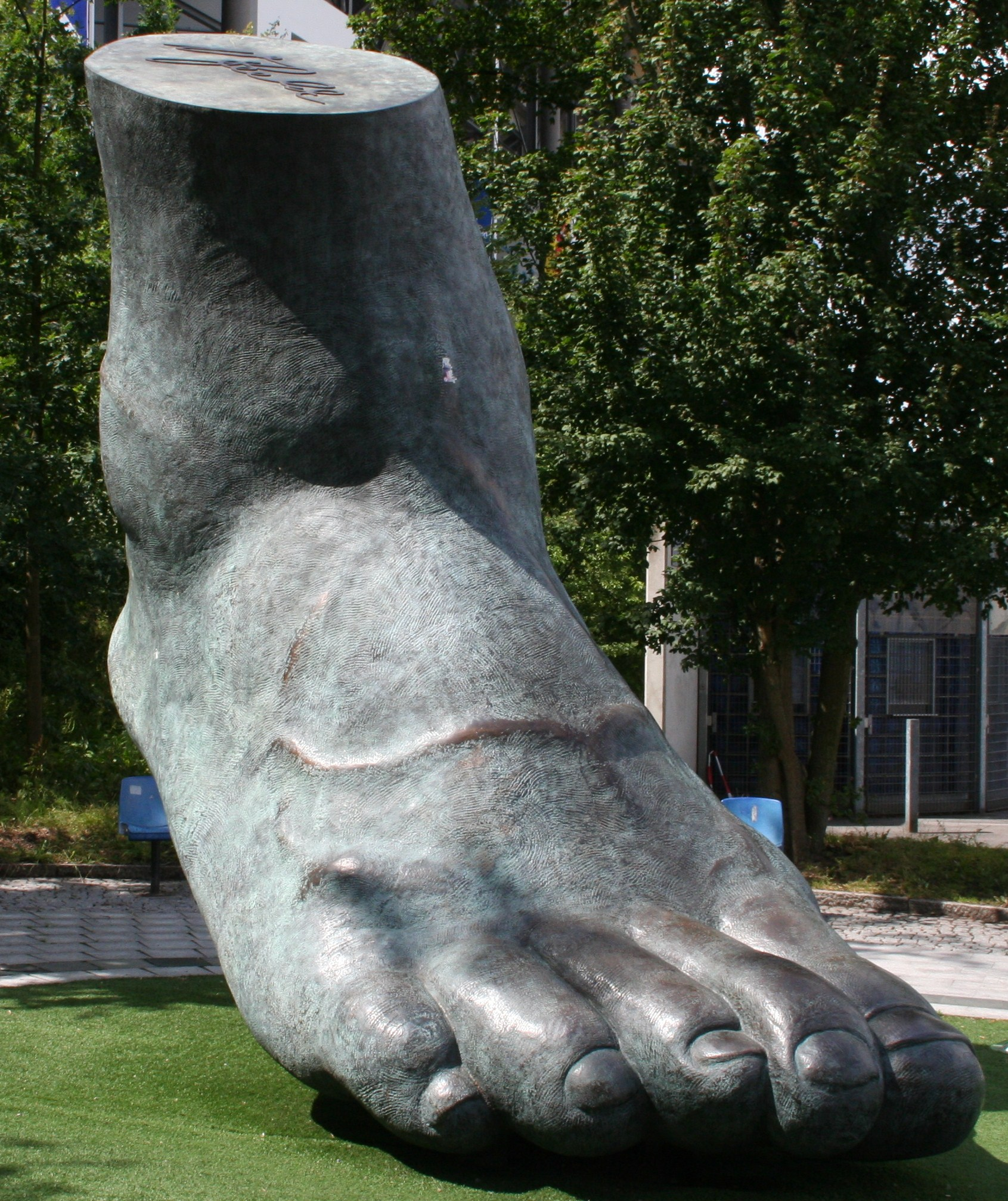
A monument of Seeler's right foot located outside the Volksparkstadion in Hamburg

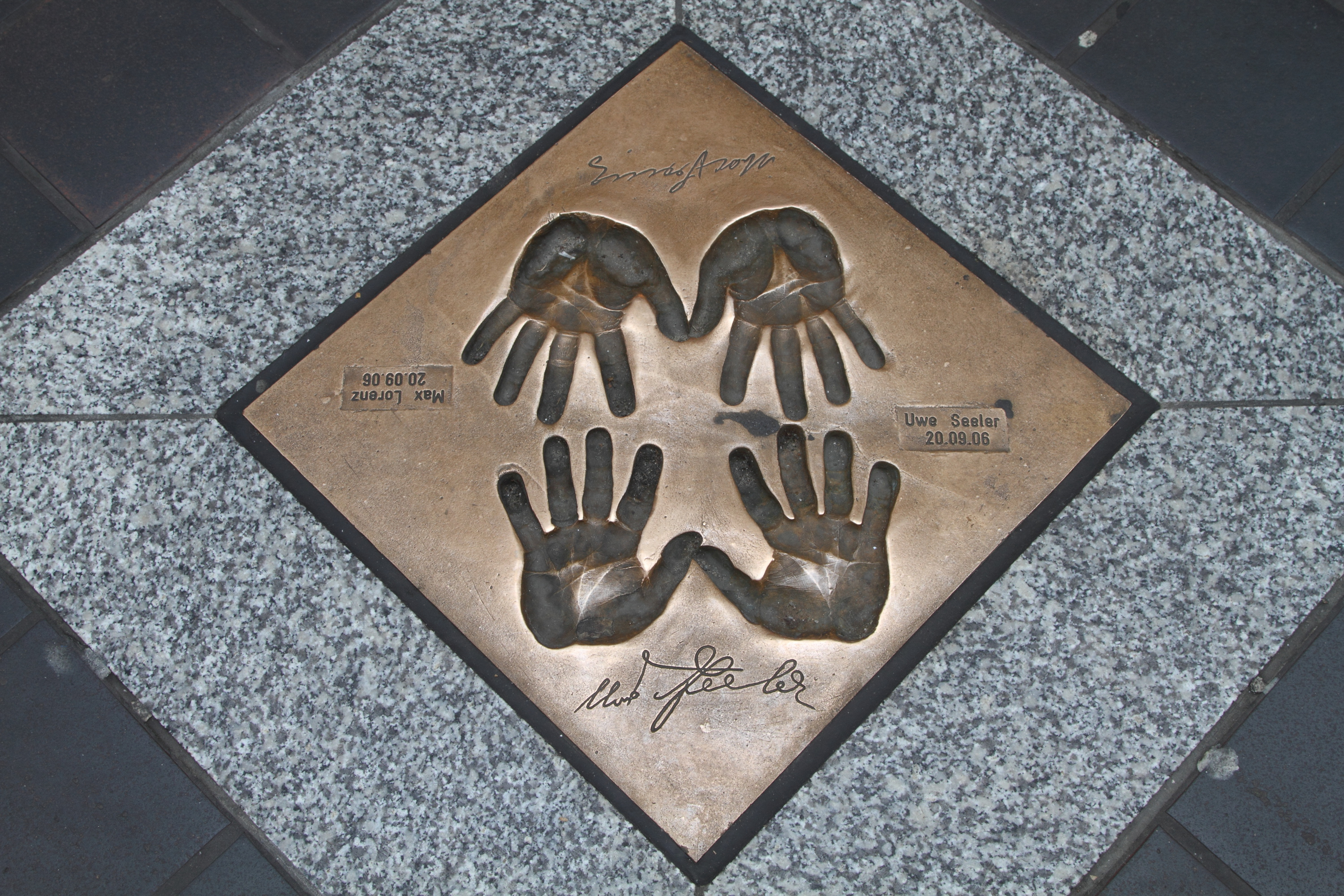
Seelers's handprints in Bremen's Lloyd Passage

Hamburger SV

- German football championship: 1959–60
- DFB-Pokal: 1962–63
- European Cup Winners' Cup runner-up: 1967–68

West Germany

- FIFA World Cup runner-up: 1966; third place: 1970

Individual

- Ballon d'Or third place: 1960
- Footballer of the Year (Germany): 1960, 1964, 1970
- FIFA XI (Reserve): 1963
- Bundesliga Top Scorer: 1964
- European Cup Winners Cup Top Scorer: 1967–68
- FIFA World Cup All-Star Team: 1966
- kicker Bundesliga Team of the Season: 1969–70
- FIFA 100
- Member of Germany's Sports Hall of Fame
- Silver Laurel Leaf

== Literature ==
- Becker, Robert: Uwe Seeler und seine goldenen Tore. Copress, München 1991, ISBN 3-7679-0363-6
- Seeler, Uwe: Danke, Fußball! – Mein Leben. Rowohlt-Verlag, Reinbek 2003, ISBN 978-3-498-06375-7 (auch als Hörbuch auf 1 CD, Hörbuch Hamburg, Hamburg 2003, ISBN 3-89903-133-4)

== See also ==
- List of men's footballers with 500 or more goals
- List of one-club men in association football
- List of FIFA World Cup top goalscorers
