= Charly Dörfel =

German footballer (born 1939)

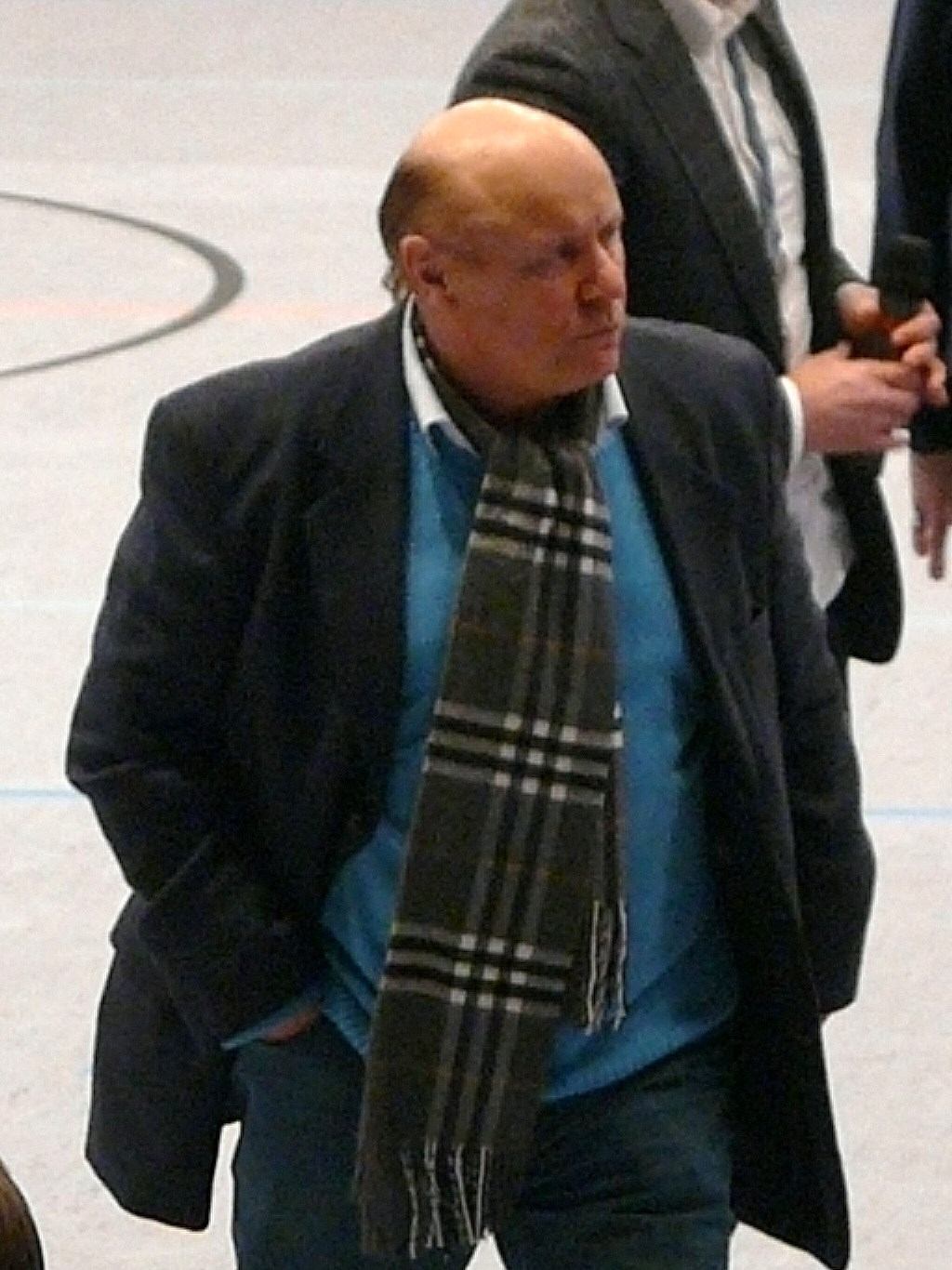
- Dörfel in 2010

Personal information
- Full name: Gert Dörfel
- Date of birth: 18 September 1939 (age 87)
- Place of birth: Hamburg, Germany
- Height: 1.70 m (5 ft 7 in)
- Positions: Striker; winger

Youth career
- –1958: PSV Hamburg
- 1958–1960: Hamburger SV

Senior career*
Years	Team	Apps	(Gls)
1960–1972	Hamburger SV	347	(114)
1972–1973	Highlands Park		
1973–1974	HSV Barmbek-Uhlenhorst	18	(3)
1974–1975	Highlands Park		
1976–1977	London City		

International career
1960–1964	West Germany	11	(7)
- * Club domestic league appearances and goals

Gert "Charly" Dörfel (born 18 September 1939) is a German former professional footballer who played as a striker or winger.

== Playing career ==
Dörfel won the 1960 West German championship and spent nine seasons in the Bundesliga after its introduction with Hamburger SV, where he appeared in 224 matches and scored 58 goals. In 1972, he went abroad to South Africa to play with Highlands Park F.C. After one season in the National Professional Soccer League he returned to Germany to play with HSV Barmbek-Uhlenhorst. Within a year he returned to South Africa, and went overseas to Canada in 1976 to play with London City in the National Soccer League.

== International career ==
He represented West Germany 11 times, including at the 1962 FIFA World Cup qualifiers against Northern Ireland (scoring two goals) and Greece (scoring one goal), the 1966 FIFA World Cup qualifier against Sweden, and eight friendlies.

== Personal life ==
His brother Bernd Dörfel also played for Germany (they are among 14 sets of siblings to have played for the national team). After retiring as a footballer, he worked for many years as a clown with engagements at among others Circus Krone.

== Honours ==
Hamburger SV

- German football championship: 1960
- DFB-Pokal: 1962–63; runner-up: 1966–67
- UEFA Cup Winners' Cup runner-up: 1967–68
