= List of flag bearers for Ghana at the Olympics =

Ghana at the Olympics
- IOC code: GHA
- NOC: Ghana Olympic Committee
- Website: ghanaolympic.org
- Medals: Gold 0 Silver 1 Bronze 4 Total 5

Summer appearances
- 1952; 1956; 1960; 1964; 1968; 1972; 1976–1980; 1984; 1988; 1992; 1996; 2000; 2004; 2008; 2012; 2016; 2020; 2024

Winter appearances
- 2010; 2014; 2018; 2022; 2026

This is a list of flag bearers who have represented Ghana at the Olympics.

Flag bearers carry the national flag of their country at the opening ceremony of the Olympic Games.

| # | Event year | Season | Flag bearer | Sport |
|---|---|---|---|---|
| 1 | 1972 | Summer | Sam Bugri | Athletics |
| 2 | 1984 | Summer | Makarios Djan | Athletics |
| 3 | 1988 | Summer | John Myles-Mills | Athletics |
| 4 | 1996 | Summer | Moro Tijani | Boxing |
| 5 | 2000 | Summer | Kennedy Osei | Athletics |
| 6 | 2004 | Summer | Andrew Owusu | Athletics |
| 7 | 2008 | Summer | Vida Anim | Athletics |
| 8 | 2010 | Winter | Kwame Nkrumah-Acheampong | Alpine Skiing |
| 9 | 2012 | Summer | Maxwell Amponsah | Boxing |
| 10 | 2016 | Summer | Flings Owusu-Agyapong | Athletics |
| 11 | 2018 | Winter | Akwasi Frimpong | Skeleton |
| 12 | 2020 | Summer | Nadia Eke | Athletics |
| 12 | 2020 | Summer | Sulemanu Tetteh | Boxing |
| 13 | 2022 | Winter | Carlos Mäder | Alpine skiing |
| 14 | 2024 | Summer | Joseph Amoah | Athletics |
| 14 | 2024 | Summer | Rose Amoanimaa Yeboah | Athletics |

== See also ==
- Ghana at the Olympics
