= Ghana at the 1992 Summer Olympics =

- IOC code: GHA
- NOC: Ghana Olympic Committee

in Barcelona
- Competitors: 36 (34 men and 2 women) in 4 sports
- Medals Ranked 54th: Gold 0 Silver 0 Bronze 1 Total 1

Summer Olympics appearances (overview)
- 1952; 1956; 1960; 1964; 1968; 1972; 1976–1980; 1984; 1988; 1992; 1996; 2000; 2004; 2008; 2012; 2016; 2020; 2024

Ghana competed at the 1992 Summer Olympics in Barcelona, Spain.

== Medalists ==
Medal	Name	Sport	Event	Date
Bronze	Joachin Yaw Acheampong; Simon Addo; Sammi Adjei; Mamood Amadu; Frank Amankwah; Bernard Aryee; Isaac Asare; Kwame Ayew; Ibrahim Dossey; Mohammed Gargo; Mohammed Dramani Kalilu; Maxwell Konadu; Ossei Kuffour; Ablade Kumah; Nii Odartey Lamptey; Anthony Mensah; Alex Nyarko; Yaw Preko; Shamo Quaye; Oli Rahman	Football	Men's tournament	7 August

== Competitors ==
The following is the list of number of competitors in the Games.

Sport	Men	Women	Total
Athletics	8	0	8
Boxing	4	–	4
Football	20	–	20
Table tennis	0	2	2
Total	32	2	34

== Athletics ==
Men
Track and road events

Athlete	Event	Heats		Quarterfinal		Semifinal		Final	
Athlete	Event	Result	Rank	Result	Rank	Result	Rank	Result	Rank
Eric Akogyiram	100 metres	10.60	26 Q	10.68	30	Did not advance			
John Myles-Mills	100 metres	10.64	30 Q	10.41	20	Did not advance			
Emmanuel Tuffour	100 metres	10.45	14 Q	10.31	11 Q	10.34	13	Did not advance	
Nelson Boateng	200 metres	21.03	21 Q	21.04	29	Did not advance			
Emmanuel Tuffour	200 metres	21.07	24 Q	20.58	12 q	20.78	11	Did not advance	
Solomon Amegatcher	400 metres	45.42	8 Q	DNF		Did not advance			
Tim Hesse	400 metres	46.67	40	Did not advance					
Kennedy Osei	800 metres	1:47.17	13 Q	—N/a		1:46.20	12	Did not advance	
John Myles-Mills; Eric Akogyiram; Emmanuel Tuffour; Nelson Boateng	4 × 100 metres relay	40.11	15 q	—N/a		39.28	10	Did not advance	

Field events

Athlete	Event	Qualification		Final	
Athlete	Event	Distance	Position	Distance	Position
Francis Dodoo	Triple jump	NM		Did not advance	

== Boxing ==
Athlete	Event	Round of 32	Round of 16	Quarterfinals	Semifinals	Final	
Athlete	Event	Opposition Result	Opposition Result	Opposition Result	Opposition Result	Opposition Result	Rank
Stephen Ahialey	Light flyweight	Bye	Williams (GBR); L 3–11	Did not advance			
Alex Baba	Flyweight	Ingle (GBR); L 7–9	Did not advance				
Dong Seidu	Light welterweight	Henry (BAR); L DQ	Did not advance				
Joseph Laryea	Middleweight	Hernández (CUB); L 0–6	Did not advance				

== Football ==
Summary

Key:

- A.E.T – After extra time.
- P – Match decided by penalty-shootout.

Team	Event	Group stage				Quarterfinal	Semi-final	Final / BM	
Team	Event	Opposition Score	Opposition Score	Opposition Score	Rank	Opposition Score	Opposition Score	Opposition Score	Rank
Ghana men's	Men's tournament	Australia; W 3–1	Denmark; D 0–0	Mexico; D 1–1	1 Q	Paraguay; W 4–2 AET	Spain; L 0–2	Australia; W 1–0	3rd place, bronze medalist(s)

Team roster

Head coach: Sam Arday

No.	Pos.	Player	DoB	Age	Caps	Club	Tournament games	Tournament goals	Minutes played	Sub off	Sub on	Cards yellow/red
1	GK	Anthony Mensah	31 October 1972	19	?	(Ghana) Asante Kotoko
2	DF	Frank Amankwah	29 December 1971	20	?	(Ghana) Asante Kotoko
3	DF	Isaac Asare	1 September 1974	17	?	(Belgium) Anderlecht
4	DF	Mohammed Gargo	19 June 1975	17	?	(Italy) Torino
5	DF	Joachim Yaw Acheampong	2 November 1973	18	?	(Ghana) Goldfields
6	MF	Alex Nyarko	15 October 1973	18	?	(Ghana) Dawu Youngstars
7	MF	Oli Rahman	7 July 1975	17	?	(Ghana) Asante Kotoko
8	MF	Nii Lamptey	10 December 1974	17	?	(Belgium) Anderlecht
9	FW	Kwame Ayew	28 December 1973	18	?	(France) Metz
10	MF	Shamo Quaye	22 October 1971	20	?	(Ghana) Hearts of Oak
11	MF	Samuel Kumah	26 June 1970	22	?	(Ghana) Hearts of Oak
12	DF	Samuel Kuffour	3 September 1976	15	?	(Italy) Torino
13	DF	Sammi Adjei	18 November 1973	18	?	(Ghana) Goldfields
14	DF	Mohammed Dramani Kalilu	21 October 1972	19	?	(Ghana) Hearts of Oak
15	MF	Bernard Aryee	23 April 1973	19	?	(Ghana) Hearts of Oak
16	GK	Simon Addo	11 December 1974	17	?	(Ghana) Goldfields
17	FW	Maxwell Konadu	4 December 1972	19	?	(Ghana) Asante Kotoko
18	FW	Yaw Preko	8 December 1974	17	?	(Belgium) Anderlecht
19	FW	Mamood Amadu	17 November 1972	19	?	(Ghana) Asante Kotoko
20	GK	Ibrahim Dossey	24 November 1972	19	?	(Ghana) Dawu Youngstars

Group play

Team	Pld	W	D	L	GF	GA	GD	Pts
Ghana	3	1	2	0	4	2	+2	4
Australia	3	1	1	1	5	4	+1	3
Mexico	3	0	3	0	3	3	0	3
Denmark	3	0	2	1	1	4	−3	2

Source: FIFA
26 July 1992
19:00

Ghana	3–1	Australia
Gargo 12'; Ayew 83', 89'	Report	Vidmar 91'

Estadi de la Nova Creu Alta, Sabadell
Attendance: 4,000
Referee: Ali Bujsaim (United Arab Emirates)

28 July 1992
19:00

Denmark	0–0	Ghana
	Report

Estadio La Romareda, Zaragoza
Attendance: 5,000
Referee: Juan Francisco Escobar (Paraguay)

30 July 1992
19:00

Mexico	1–1	Ghana
Rotllán 30'	Report	Ayew 79'

Estadi de la Nova Creu Alta, Sabadell
Attendance: 6,000
Referee: José Torres Cadena (Colombia)

Quarterfinal

2 August 1992
19:00

Paraguay	2–4 (a.e.t.)	Ghana
Acheampong 78' (o.g.); Campos 81'	Report	Ayew 17', 55', 120+1'; Rahman 114'

Estadio La Romareda, Zaragoza
Attendance: 5,000
Referee: Bujsaim (UAE)

Semifinal

5 August 1992
19:00

Spain	2–0	Ghana
Abelardo 25'; Berges 55'	Report

Estadio Luis Casanova, Valencia
Attendance: 36,000
Referee: Brizio Carter (MEX)

Bronze medal match

7 August 1992
20:00

Australia	0–1	Ghana
	Report	Asare 19'

Camp Nou, Barcelona
Attendance: 15,000
Referee: Díaz Vega (ESP)

== Table tennis ==
Women

Athlete	Event	Group Stage				Round of 16	Quarterfinal	Semifinal	Final	
Athlete	Event	Opposition Result	Opposition Result	Opposition Result	Rank	Opposition Result	Opposition Result	Opposition Result	Opposition Result	Rank
Helen Amankwah	Singles	Yu (PRK); L 0–2	Li (NZL); L 0–2	Yip (USA); L 0–2	4	Did not advance				
Patience Opokua	Singles	Chen (CHN); L 0–2	Sato (JPN); L 0–2	Agustin (INA); L 0–2	4	Did not advance				
Helen Amankwah; Patience Opokua	Doubles	Qiao / Deng (CHN); L 0–2	Sato / Matsumoto (JPN); L 0–2	Bogoslov / Bădescu (ROU); L w/o	4	Did not advance				
