= Ghana at the Olympics =

- IOC code: GHA
- NOC: Ghana Olympic Committee
- Website: ghanaolympic.org
- Medals Ranked 129th: Gold 0 Silver 1 Bronze 4 Total 5

Summer appearances
- 1952; 1956; 1960; 1964; 1968; 1972; 1976–1980; 1984; 1988; 1992; 1996; 2000; 2004; 2008; 2012; 2016; 2020; 2024

Winter appearances
- 2010; 2014; 2018; 2022; 2026

Ghana first participated at the Olympic Games in 1952, when it was known by the colonial name of Gold Coast. The nation has sent athletes to compete in most Summer Olympic Games since then, missing the 1956 Games, boycotting the 1976 Games in protest of the participation of New Zealand (who still had sporting links with apartheid South Africa), and joining the American-led boycott of the 1980 Summer Olympics. Ghana participated in the Winter Olympic Games for the first time in Vancouver in 2010.

Ghanaian athletes have won a total of five Olympics medals, four (three bronze and one silver) in boxing, and a bronze medal by the under-23 Ghana national football team in 1992.

The National Olympic Committee for Ghana was created in 1951 and recognized by the International Olympic Committee the upcoming year.

== Medal tables ==
=== Medals by Summer Games ===
| Games | Athletes | Gold | Silver | Bronze | Total | Rank |
| 1952 Helsinki | 7 | 0 | 0 | 0 | 0 | – |
| 1956 Melbourne | did not participate | | | | | |
| 1960 Rome | 15 | 0 | 1 | 0 | 1 | 32 |
| 1964 Tokyo | 42 | 0 | 0 | 1 | 1 | 35 |
| 1968 Mexico City | 31 | 0 | 0 | 0 | 0 | – |
| 1972 Munich | 35 | 0 | 0 | 1 | 1 | 43 |
| 1976 Montreal | boycotted | | | | | |
| 1980 Moscow | boycotted | | | | | |
| 1984 Los Angeles | 23 | 0 | 0 | 0 | 0 | – |
| 1988 Seoul | 18 | 0 | 0 | 0 | 0 | – |
| 1992 Barcelona | 37 | 0 | 0 | 1 | 1 | 54 |
| 1996 Atlanta | 35 | 0 | 0 | 0 | 0 | – |
| 2000 Sydney | 22 | 0 | 0 | 0 | 0 | – |
| 2004 Athens | 29 | 0 | 0 | 0 | 0 | – |
| 2008 Beijing | 9 | 0 | 0 | 0 | 0 | – |
| 2012 London | 9 | 0 | 0 | 0 | 0 | – |
| 2016 Rio de Janeiro | 14 | 0 | 0 | 0 | 0 | – |
| 2020 Tokyo | 14 | 0 | 0 | 1 | 1 | 86 |
| 2024 Paris | 8 | 0 | 0 | 0 | 0 | – |
| 2028 Los Angeles | future event | | | | | |
| 2032 Brisbane | future event | | | | | |
| Total | | 0 | 1 | 4 | 5 | 129 |

=== Medals by Winter Games ===
| Games | Athletes | Gold | Silver | Bronze | Total | Rank |
| 2010 Vancouver | 1 | 0 | 0 | 0 | 0 | – |
| 2014 Sochi | did not participate | | | | | |
| 2018 Pyeongchang | 1 | 0 | 0 | 0 | 0 | – |
| 2022 Beijing | 1 | 0 | 0 | 0 | 0 | – |
| 2026 Milano Cortina | did not participate | | | | | |
| 2030 French Alps | future event | | | | | |
| 2034 Utah | future event | | | | | |
| Total | | 0 | 0 | 0 | 0 | – |

=== Medals by sport ===
| Sport | Gold | Silver | Bronze | Total |
|---|---|---|---|---|
| Boxing | 0 | 1 | 3 | 4 |
| Football | 0 | 0 | 1 | 1 |
| Totals (2 entries) | 0 | 1 | 4 | 5 |

== List of medalists ==
| Medal | Name | Games | Sport | Event |
|---|---|---|---|---|
| Silver | Clement Quartey | 1960 Rome | Boxing | Men's light welterweight |
| Bronze | Eddie Blay | 1964 Tokyo | Boxing | Men's light welterweight |
| Bronze | Prince Amartey | 1972 Munich | Boxing | Men's middleweight |
| Bronze | Football team: Joachin Yaw Acheampong Simon Addo Sammi Adjei Frank Amankwah Bernard Aryee Isaac Asare Kwame Ayew Ibrahim Dossey Mohammed Gargo Samuel Kumah Nii Lamptey Yaw Preko Shamo Quaye | 1992 Barcelona | Football | Men's competition |
| Bronze | Samuel Takyi | 2020 Tokyo | Boxing | Men's featherweight |

== See also ==
- List of flag bearers for Ghana at the Olympics
- Category:Olympic competitors for Ghana
- Ghana at the Paralympics
- Tropical nations at the Winter Olympics
