= Ghana at the 1996 Summer Olympics =

- IOC code: GHA
- NOC: Ghana Olympic Committee

in Atlanta
- Competitors: 35 in 4 sports
- Flag bearer: Tijani Moro
- Medals: Gold 0 Silver 0 Bronze 0 Total 0

Summer Olympics appearances (overview)
- 1952; 1956; 1960; 1964; 1968; 1972; 1976–1980; 1984; 1988; 1992; 1996; 2000; 2004; 2008; 2012; 2016; 2020; 2024

Ghana competed at the 1996 Summer Olympics in Atlanta, United States. Boxer Tijani Moro, who won Ghana's only medal at the 1994 Commonwealth Games, carried his country's flag at the opening ceremony.

== Competitors ==
The following is the list of number of competitors in the Games.

Sport	Men	Women	Total
Athletics	13	2	15
Boxing	2	–	2
Football	16	0	16
Table tennis	2	0	2
Total	33	2	35

== Results by event ==
=== Athletics ===
==== Men ====
Track and road events

Athletes	Events	Heat Round 1		Heat Round 2		Semifinal		Final	
Athletes	Events	Time	Rank	Time	Rank	Time	Rank	Time	Rank
Eric Nkansah	100 metres	10.26	13 Q	10.24	15 Q	10.26	14	Did not advance	
Emmanuel Tuffour	100 metres	10.15	5 Q	10.18	12 q	10.22	13	Did not advance	
Emmanuel Tuffour	200 metres	20.85	39 Q	20.49	11 q	20.61	14	Did not advance	
Albert Agyemang	200 metres	20.69	22 Q	20.87	31	Did not advance			
Ibrahim Hassan	400 metres	Did not finish		Did not advance					
Frank Boateng	110 metres hurdles	13.87	29	Did not advance					
Albert Agyemang; Eric Nkansah; Christian Nsiah; Emmanuel Tuffour; Abdul Aziz Zakari	4 x 100 metres relay	39.47	15 q	N/A		38.62	6 Q	Did not start	
Solomon Amegatcher; Abu Duah; Julius Sedame; Ahmed Ali	4 x 400 metres relay	3:05.53	18	N/A		Did not advance			

Field events

Athlete	Event	Qualification		Final	
Athlete	Event	Result	Rank	Result	Rank
Andrew Owusu	Long jump	7.91	16	Did not advance	
Francis Dodoo	Long jump	16.24	26	Did not advance	

==== Women ====
Track and road events

Athletes	Events	Heat Round 1		Heat Round 2		Semifinal		Final	
Athletes	Events	Time	Rank	Time	Rank	Time	Rank	Time	Rank
Mercy Addy	400 metres	54.92	44	Did not advance					
Vida Nsiah	100 metres hurdles	13.34	34	Did not advance					

=== Boxing ===
Athlete	Event	Round of 32	Round of 16	Quarterfinal	Semifinal	Final
Athlete	Event	Opposition Result	Opposition Result	Opposition Result	Opposition Result	Opposition Result
Alfred Tetteh	Light-flyweight	Berhili (MAR); L 10-5	Did not advance			
Ashiakwei Aryee	Light-middleweight	bye	Cadeau (SEY); L 18-6	Did not advance		

=== Football ===
==== Men's Tournament ====
Group stage - Group C

Team	Pld	W	D	L	GF	GA	GD	Pts
Mexico	3	1	2	0	2	1	+1	5
Ghana	3	1	1	1	4	4	0	4
South Korea	3	1	1	1	2	2	0	4
Italy	3	1	0	2	4	5	−1	3

July 21, 1996
12.00

South Korea	1 – 0	Ghana
Yoon Jung-Hwan 41' (pen.)	Report

RFK Stadium, Washington, D.C.
Attendance: 45,946
Referee: Lennie (AUS)

July 23, 1996
21.00

Ghana	3 – 2	Italy
Sabah 15', 74'; Ahinful 63' (pen.)	Report	Branca 8', 44' (pen.)

RFK Stadium, Washington, D.C.
Attendance: 27,849
Referee: Garcia Aranda (ESP)

July 25, 1996
21.00

Mexico	1 – 1	Ghana
Abundis 65'	Report	Ebenzer 44'

RFK Stadium, Washington, D.C.
Attendance: 30,237
Referee: Pereira (BRA)

Quarterfinal

July 28, 1996
18:00

Brazil	4 – 2	Ghana
Duodu 18' (o.g.); Ronaldo 56', 62'; Bebeto 72''	Report	Akonnor 23'; Aboagye 53'

Orange Bowl, Miami
Attendance: 45,257
Referee: Un-Prasert (THA)

Team roster

- Richard Kingson
- Jacob Nettey
- Nii Aryee Welbeck
- Stephen Baidoo
- Joe Addo
- Afo Duodu
- Samuel Kuffour
- Mallam Yahaya
- Augustine Ahinful
- Charles Akonnor
- Emmanuel Duah
- Felix Aboagye
- Kennedy Ohene
- Ebenezer Hagan
- Christian Sabah
- Prince Amoako Koranteng
- Emmanuel Osei Kuffour
- Simon Addo

=== Table Tennis ===
==== Men's Singles Tournament ====
Group stage - Group D

Team	Pld	W	L	GW	GL	PW	PL
Jan-Ove Waldner (SWE)	3	3	0	6	1	148	111
Lee Chul-Seung (KOR)	3	2	1	4	2	114	98
Ilija Lupulesku (YUG)	3	1	2	3	4	129	120
Isaac Opoku (GHA)	3	0	3	0	6	64	126

==== Men's Doubles Tournament ====
Group stage - Group C

Team	Pld	W	L	GW	GL	PW	PL
(China) Kong Linghui / Liu Guoliang	3	3	0	6	0	126	77
(France) Patrick Chila / Christopher Legout	3	2	1	4	3	133	102
(Sweden) Peter Karlsson / Thomas von Scheele	3	1	2	3	4	116	120
(Ghana) Winifred Addy / Isaac Opoku	3	0	3	0	6	50	126
