= Ghana at the 2020 Summer Olympics =

- IOC code: GHA
- NOC: Ghana Olympic Committee

in Tokyo, Japan July 23, 2021 – August 8, 2021
- Competitors: 14 in 5 sports
- Flag bearers (opening): Nadia Eke; Sulemanu Tetteh
- Flag bearer (closing): Samuel Takyi
- Medals Ranked 86th: Gold 0 Silver 0 Bronze 1 Total 1

Summer Olympics appearances (overview)
- 1952; 1956; 1960; 1964; 1968; 1972; 1976–1980; 1984; 1988; 1992; 1996; 2000; 2004; 2008; 2012; 2016; 2020; 2024

Ghana competed at the 2020 Summer Olympics in Tokyo. Originally scheduled to take place from 24 July to 9 August 2020, the Games were postponed to 23 July to 8 August 2021, because of the COVID-19 pandemic. It was the nation's fifteenth appearance at the Summer Olympics, having taken part in all but three editions since its debut (as the Gold Coast) in 1952. Ghana did not attend Montreal 1976 because of the African boycott, as well as the Moscow 1980, when the nation joined the United States-led boycott.

== Medalists ==
Medal	Name	Sport	Event	Date
Bronze	Samuel Takyi	Boxing	Men's featherweight	August 3

== Competitors ==
The following is the list of number of competitors in the Games.

Sport	Men	Women	Total
Athletics	6	1	7
Boxing	3	0	3
Judo	1	0	1
Swimming	1	1	2
Weightlifting	1	0	1
Total	12	2	14

== Athletics ==
Ghanaian athletes achieved the entry standards, either by qualifying time or by world ranking, in the following track and field events (up to a maximum of 3 athletes in each event):

Key

- Note–Ranks given for track events are within the athlete's heat only
- Q = Qualified for the next round
- q = Qualified for the next round as a fastest loser or, in field events, by position without achieving the qualifying target
- NR = National record
- N/A = Round not applicable for the event
- Bye = Athlete not required to compete in round

Track & road events

Athlete	Event	Heat		Quarterfinal		Semifinal		Final	
Athlete	Event	Result	Rank	Result	Rank	Result	Rank	Result	Rank
Benjamin Azamati-Kwaku	Men's 100 m	Bye		10.13	4	Did not advance			
Joseph Amoah	Men's 200 m	20.35 SB	3 Q	—		20.27 =SB	4	Did not advance	
Sarfo Ansah; Benjamin Azamati-Kwaku; Joseph Oduro Manu; Sean Safo-Antwi; Emmanuel Yeboah	Men's 4 × 100 m relay	38.08 NR	5 q	—				DSQ	

Field events

Athlete	Event	Qualification		Final	
Athlete	Event	Distance	Position	Distance	Position
Nadia Eke	Women's triple jump	NM	—	Did not advance	

== Boxing ==
Ghana entered three boxers into the Olympic tournament. London 2012 Olympian Sulemanu Tetteh (men's flyweight) and rookie Samuel Takyi (men's featherweight) scored a box-off victory each to secure places in their respective weight divisions at the 2020 African Qualification Tournament in Diamniadio, Senegal. Shakul Samed completed the nation's boxing lineup by topping the list of eligible boxers from Africa in the men's light heavyweight division of the IOC's Boxing Task Force Rankings.

Athlete	Event	Round of 32	Round of 16	Quarterfinals	Semifinals	Final	
Athlete	Event	Opposition Result	Opposition Result	Opposition Result	Opposition Result	Opposition Result	Rank
Sulemanu Tetteh	Men's flyweight	Marte (DOM); W 3–2	Veitía (CUB); L 0–5	Did not advance			
Samuel Takyi	Men's featherweight	Bye	Caicedo (ECU); W 5–0	Ávila (COL); W 3–2	Ragan (USA); L 1–4	Did not advance	3rd place, bronze medalist(s)
Shakul Samed	Men's light heavyweight	Bye	Malkan (TUR); L RSC	Did not advance			

== Judo ==
Ghana qualified one judoka for the men's middleweight category (90 kg) at the Games. Kwadjo Anani accepted a continental berth from Africa as the nation's top-ranked judoka outside of direct qualifying position in the IJF World Ranking List of June 28, 2021.

Athlete	Event	Round of 64	Round of 32	Round of 16	Quarterfinal	Semifinal	Repechage	Final / BM	
Athlete	Event	Opposition Result	Opposition Result	Opposition Result	Opposition Result	Opposition Result	Opposition Result	Opposition Result	Rank
Kwadjo Anani	Men's −90 kg	Bye	Gwak D-h (KOR); L 00–01	Did not advance					

== Swimming ==
Ghana received a universality invitation from FINA to send two top-ranked swimmers (one per gender) in their respective individual events to the Olympics, based on the FINA Points System of June 28, 2021.

Athlete	Event	Heat		Semifinal		Final	
Athlete	Event	Time	Rank	Time	Rank	Time	Rank
Abeku Jackson	Men's 100 m butterfly	53.39	45	Did not advance			
Unilez Takyi	Women's 50 m freestyle	27.85	57	Did not advance			

== Weightlifting ==
Ghana entered one male weightlifter into the Olympic competition. Rio 2016 Olympian Christian Amoah topped the list of weightlifters from Africa in the men's 96 kg category based on the IWF Absolute Continental Rankings.

Athlete	Event	Snatch		Clean & Jerk		Total	Rank
Athlete	Event	Result	Rank	Result	Rank	Total	Rank
Christian Amoah	Men's −96 kg	145	14	170	13	315	12
