= Table tennis at the 1992 Summer Olympics – Women's doubles =

Table tennis at the Olympics

Table tennis – Women's doubles at the Games of the XXV Olympiad
- Venue: Estació del Nord Sports Hall
- Date: 28 July to 3 August 1992
- Competitors: 62 from 25 nations

Medalists
1st place, gold medalist(s)		Deng Yaping; Qiao Hong	China
2nd place, silver medalist(s)		Chen Zihe; Gao Jun	China
3rd place, bronze medalist(s)		Hyun Jung-hwa; Hong Cha-ok	South Korea
3rd place, bronze medalist(s)		Li Bun-hui; Yu Sun-bok	North Korea

These are the results of the women's doubles competition, one of two events for female competitors in table tennis at the 1992 Summer Olympics in Barcelona.

== Group stage ==
=== Group A ===
Rank	Athlete	W	L	GW	GL	PW	PL	CHN	GER	ROU	PER
1	Chen Zihe and Gao Jun (CHN)	3	0	6	0	126	52	X	2–0	2–0	2–0
2	Elke Schall and Nicole Struse (GER)	2	1	4	3	124	122	0–2	X	2–1	2–0
3	Emilia Ciosu and Adriana Năstase-Simion-Zamfir (ROU)	1	2	3	4	118	123	0–2	1–2	X	2–0
4	Eliana González and Magaly Montes (PER)	0	3	0	6	55	126	0–2	0–2	0–2	X

=== Group B ===
Rank	Athlete	W	L	GW	GL	PW	PL	CHN	JPN	ROU	GHA
1	Deng Yaping and Qiao Hong (CHN)	3	0	6	1	141	93	X	2–0	2–1	2–0
2	Yukino Matsumoto and Rika Sato (JPN)	2	1	4	3	128	109	0–2	X	2–1	2–0
3	Otilia Badescu and Maria Bogoslov (ROU)	1	2	2	4	95	111	1–2	1–2	X	2–0
4	Helen Amankwaa and Patience Opokuah (GHA)	0	3	0	6	33	84	0–2	0–2	0–2	X

=== Group C ===
Rank	Athlete	W	L	GW	GL	PW	PL	KOR	GBR	EUN
1	Hong Cha-Ok and Hyun Jung-Hwa (KOR)	2	0	4	1	100	71	X	2–1	2–0
2	Lisa Lomas and Andrea Holt (GBR)	1	1	3	2	92	95	1–2	X	2–0
3	Galina Melnik and Valentina Popova (EUN)	0	2	0	4	58	84	0–2	0–2	X

=== Group D ===
Rank	Athlete	W	L	GW	GL	PW	PL	PRK	TCH	SWE	TUN
1	Li Bun-Hui and Yu Sun-Bok (PRK)	3	0	6	0	129	77	X	2–0	2–0	2–0
2	Marie Hrachová and Jaroslava Mihočková (TCH)	2	1	4	2	128	104	0–2	X	2–0	2–0
3	Lotta Erlman and Marie Svensson (SWE)	1	2	2	4	108	120	0–2	0–2	X	2–0
4	Feiza Ben Aissa and Sonia Touati (TUN)	0	3	0	6	62	126	0–2	0–2	0–2	X

=== Group E ===
Rank	Athlete	W	L	GW	GL	PW	PL	HKG	FRA	USA	ARG
1	Chai Po Wa and Chan Tan Lui (HKG)	3	0	6	0	126	79	X	2–0	2–0	2–0
2	Emmanuelle Coubat and Xiaoming Wang-Dréchou (FRA)	2	1	4	2	120	91	0–2	X	2–0	2–0
3	Diana Gee and Lily Hugh (USA)	1	2	2	4	98	111	0–2	0–2	X	2–0
4	Alejandra Gabaglio and Kim Hae-Ja (ARG)	0	3	0	6	63	126	0–2	0–2	0–2	X

=== Group F ===
Rank	Athlete	W	L	GW	GL	PW	PL	NED	IOP	AUS	BRA
1	Mirjam Hooman and Bettine Vriesekoop (NED)	3	0	6	1	144	95	X	2–1	2–0	2–0
2	Jasna Fazlić and Gordana Perkučin (IOP)	2	1	5	2	134	111	1–2	X	2–0	2–0
3	Ying Kwok and Kerri Tepper (AUS)	1	2	2	4	104	113	0–2	0–2	X	2–0
4	Monica Doti and Lyanne Miyuki Kosaka (BRA)	0	3	0	6	63	126	0–2	0–2	0–2	X

=== Group G ===
Rank	Athlete	W	L	GW	GL	PW	PL	EUN	PRK	NGR	ESP
1	Irina Palina and Elena Timina (EUN)	3	0	6	1	141	93	X	2–1	2–0	2–0
2	Wi Bok-Sun and Kim Hye-yong (PRK)	2	1	5	2	135	110	1–2	X	2–0	2–0
3	Bose Kaffo and Abiola Odumosu (NGR)	1	2	2	4	88	112	0–2	0–2	X	2–0
4	Gloria Gauchia and Ana-Maria Godes (ESP)	0	3	0	6	77	126	0–2	0–2	0–2	X

=== Group H ===
Rank	Athlete	W	L	GW	GL	PW	PL	KOR	JPN	INA	CUB
1	Hong Soon-Hwa and Lee Jung-Im (KOR)	3	0	6	1	142	92	X	2–1	2–0	2–0
2	Mika Hoshino and Fumiyo Yamashita (JPN)	2	1	5	2	136	102	1–2	X	2–0	2–0
3	Rossy Pratiwi Dipoyanti and Ling Ling Agustin (INA)	1	2	2	4	90	109	0–2	0–2	X	2–0
4	Maricel Ramirez and Yolanda Rodriguez (CUB)	0	3	0	6	61	126	0–2	0–2	0–2	X

== Knockout stage ==
Quarterfinals
A1	Chen Zihe (CHN); Gao Jun (CHN)	21	14	21	21
E1	Chai Po Wa (HKG); Chan Tan Lui (HKG)	6	21	15	18
H1	Hong Soon-hwa (KOR); Lee Jung-im (KOR)	16	22	21	21
D1	Li Bun-hui (PRK); Yu Sun-bok (PRK)	21	24	14	23
C1	Hong Cha-ok (KOR); Hyun Jung-hwa (KOR)	21	21	21
G1	Irina Palina (EUN); Elena Timina (EUN)	12	15	11
F1	Mirjam Hooman (NED); Bettine Vriesekoop (NED)	15	21	10	11
B1	Deng Yaping (CHN); Qiao Hong (CHN)	21	19	21	21

Semifinals
A1	Chen Zihe (CHN); Gao Jun (CHN)	21	17	21	21
D1	Li Bun-hui (PRK); Yu Sun-bok (PRK)	12	21	13	19
C1	Hong Cha-ok (KOR); Hyun Jung-hwa (KOR)	21	17	17	12
B1	Deng Yaping (CHN); Qiao Hong (CHN)	17	21	21	21

Gold medal match
A1	Chen Zihe (CHN); Gao Jun (CHN)	13	21	14	19
B1	Deng Yaping (CHN); Qiao Hong (CHN)	21	14	21	21
