= Ghana at the 2000 Summer Olympics =

- IOC code: GHA
- NOC: Ghana Olympic Committee

in Sydney
- Competitors: 22 (16 men and 6 women) in 2 sports
- Flag bearer: Kennedy Osei
- Medals: Gold 0 Silver 0 Bronze 0 Total 0

Summer Olympics appearances (overview)
- 1952; 1956; 1960; 1964; 1968; 1972; 1976–1980; 1984; 1988; 1992; 1996; 2000; 2004; 2008; 2012; 2016; 2020; 2024

Ghana competed at the 2000 Summer Olympics in Sydney, Australia.

== Competitors ==
The following is the list of number of competitors in the Games.

Sport	Men	Women	Total
Athletics	12	6	18
Boxing	4	–	4
Total	16	6	22

== Athletics ==
Key

- Note–Ranks given for track events are within the athlete's heat only
- Q = Qualified for the next round
- q = Qualified for the next round as a fastest loser or, in field events, by position without achieving the qualifying target
- NR = National record
- N/A = Round not applicable for the event
- Bye = Athlete not required to compete in round

Men
Track & road events

Athlete	Event	Heat		Quarterfinal		Semifinal		Final	
Athlete	Event	Result	Rank	Result	Rank	Result	Rank	Result	Rank
Leo Myles-Mills	100 metres	10.15	3 Q	10.23	2 Q	10.25	5	did not advance	
Aziz Zakari	100 metres	10.31	1 Q	10.22	3 Q	10.16	4 Q	did not finish	
Christian Nsiah	100 metres	10.44	5	did not advance					
Albert Agyemang	200 metres	21.22	6	did not advance					
Tanko Braimah	200 metres	DQ		did not advance					
Kenneth Andam; Leo Myles-Mills; Christian Nsiah; Aziz Zakari	4 x 100 metres relay	DNF		did not advance					
Daniel Adomako; Abu Duah; Daniel Mensah Kwei; Nathaniel Martey	4 x 400 metres relay	03:07.07	4	did not advance					

Field events

Athlete	Event	Qualification		Final	
Athlete	Event	Result	Rank	Result	Rank
Mark Anthony Awere	Long jump	7.57	34	did not advance	
Andrew Owusu	Triple jump	14.12	38	did not advance	

Women

Track & road events

Athlete	Event	Heat		Quarterfinal		Semifinal		Final	
Athlete	Event	Result	Rank	Result	Rank	Result	Rank	Result	Rank
Vida Nsiah	100 metres	11.18	=6 Q	11.19	8 Q	11.37	12	did not advance	
Monica Afia Twum	100 metres	11.48	=28 Q	11.70	31	did not advance			
Monica Afia Twum	200 metres	23.51	35	did not advance					
Helena Wrappah	200 metres	23.64	39	did not advance					
Mavis Akoto; Vida Anim; Veronica Bawuah; Vida Nsiah; Monica Afia Twum	4 x 100 metres relay	43.77 NR	13 Q	—N/a		43.19 NR	9	did not advance	

== Boxing ==
Men

Athlete	Event	Round of 32	Round of 16	Quarterfinals	Semifinals	Final	
Athlete	Event	Opposition Result	Opposition Result	Opposition Result	Opposition Result	Opposition Result	Rank
Ray Narh	Lightweight	Ramos (IOA); W RSC–R2	Kotelnyk (UKR); L 11–17	did not advance			
Ben Neequaye	Light welterweight	Kinuthia (KEN); W 14–2	Allalou (ALG); L 6–15	did not advance			
Osumanu Adama	Light middleweight	Marmouri (TUN); L RSC–R2	did not advance				
Charles Adamu	Light heavyweight	Fry (GBR); W 16–3	Fedchuk (UKR); L 5–13	did not advance			
