= Ghana at the 2010 Winter Olympics =

- IOC code: GHA
- NOC: Ghana Olympic Committee

in Vancouver
- Competitors: 1 in 1 sport
- Flag bearer: Kwame Nkrumah-Acheampong
- Medals: Gold 0 Silver 0 Bronze 0 Total 0

Winter Olympics appearances (overview)
- 2010; 2014; 2018; 2022; 2026

Ghana competed in the 2010 Winter Olympics in Vancouver, British Columbia, Canada. The country's participation at the Games marked its Winter Olympics debut, although it had competed at the Summer Olympics since 1952. Also, Vancouver 2010 marked the first time the Ghanaian Olympic team competed in Canada as Ghana and other nations boycotted the 1976 Summer Olympics in Montreal due to the IOC's refusal to ban New Zealand. The delegation for the 2010 Winter Games consisted of a single alpine skier, Kwame Nkrumah-Acheampong, also known as the "Snow leopard". He was also the nation's flag bearer in the Parade of Nations. Nkrumah-Acheampong did not win any medals, finishing behind his fellow African, Samir Azzimani of Morocco.

== Background ==
Ghana first participated in a Summer Olympic Games as the Gold Coast at the 1952 Games in Helsinki, Finland. They participated on 12 occasions prior to 2010, winning four medals along the way; three in boxing and a bronze medal in 1992 for the football team. In 2010, the nation made their Winter Olympics debut in Vancouver, British Columbia, Canada. They sent a single alpine skier Kwame Nkrumah-Acheampong, who was also selected to be the flag bearer in the Parade of Nations during the opening ceremony.

== Alpine skiing ==
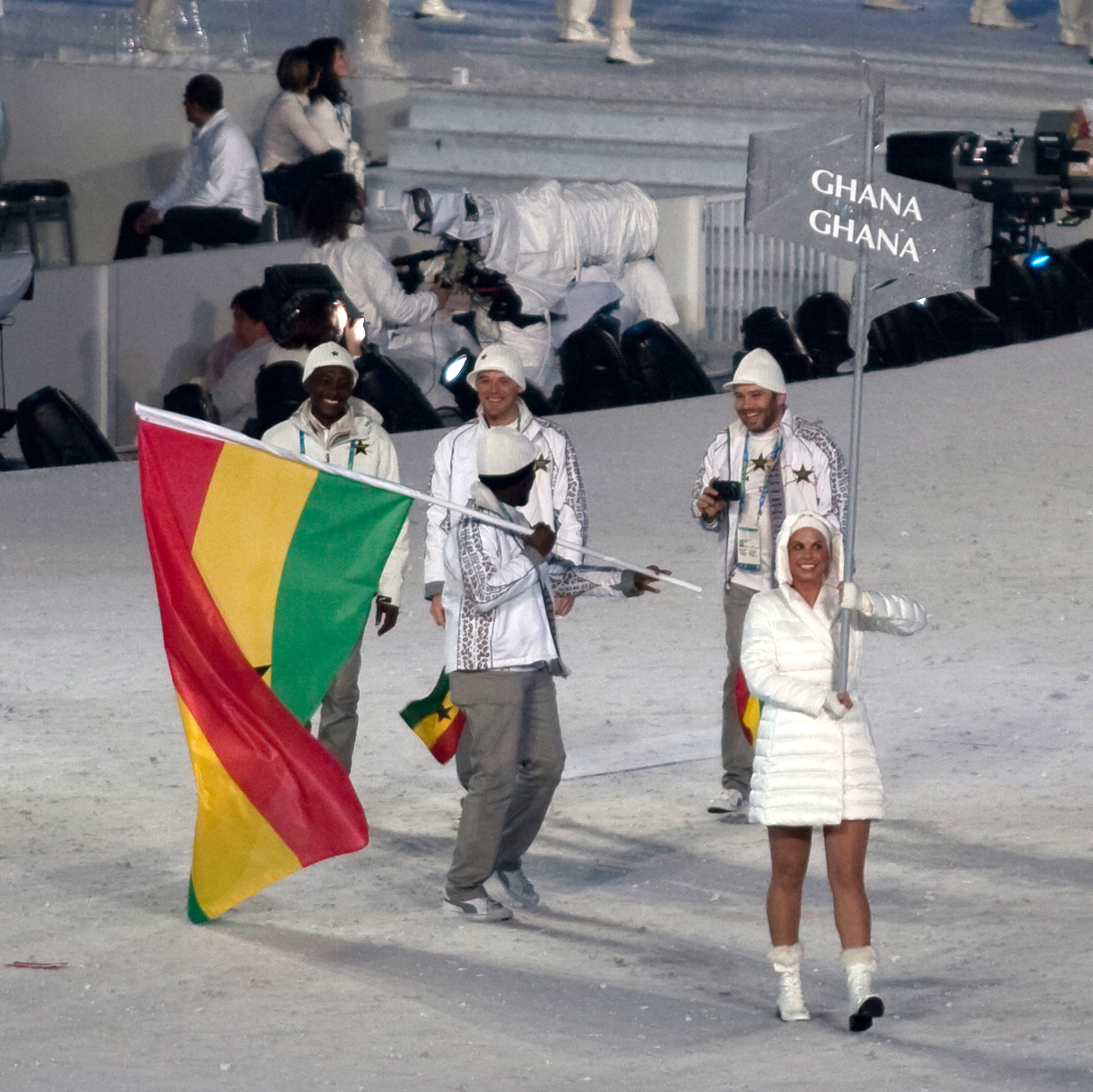
The Ghanaian Olympic team entering the stadium during the opening ceremonies.

The sole Ghanaian athlete at the Games, Kwame Nkrumah-Acheampong, competed in the men's slalom. Known as the "Snow leopard", Nkrumah-Acheampong was born in Glasgow, Scotland and raised in Accra, Ghana. He moved to England in 2000, and learnt to ski at the ski slope in Milton Keynes after being hired as a receptionist there. He joined the international skiing circuit in 2005, becoming the first black African to do so.

In 2009, he qualified for the 2010 Winter Olympics, scoring 137.5 International Ski Federation points, within the required range of 120–140 points. He previously attempted to qualify for the 2006 Winter Olympics. Nkrumah-Acheampong was one of three African skiers at the 2010 Winter Games, alongside Samir Azzimani of Morocco, and Leyti Seck of Senegal.

Nkrumah-Acheampong only received partial funding from the Ghana Olympic Committee, allowing him to travel to Vancouver, but not covering the travel costs of his support team. When bookmaker Paddy Power discovered the situation, they paid for his manager, coach and physiotherapist to travel to Canada to help his preparation for the Olympics. Nkrumah-Acheampong also sought individual sponsorship for the spots on his leopard spotted ski race suit.

He said "Some people were skeptical, others just did not believe that it was possible to train in such a short period of time and try and qualify, but I think now I can stand up and say it's possible." He was listed by Time as one of the 25 Winter Olympians to watch during the games, and he was placed as a 500–1 shot for the gold medal. In the slalom, Nkrumah-Acheampong registered times of 1:09:08 and 1:13:52 in his two runs, resulting in a final position of 47th overall. This was one place behind Azzimani of Morocco.

| Athlete | Event | Run 1 | | Run 2 | | Total | |
| Athlete | Event | Time | Rank | Time | Rank | Time | Rank |
|---|---|---|---|---|---|---|---|
| Kwame Nkrumah-Acheampong | Men's slalom | 1:09.08 | 53 | 1:13.52 | 48 | 2:22.60 | 47 |
