= Ghana at the 2018 Winter Olympics =

- Flag of Ghana
- IOC code: GHA
- NOC: Ghana Olympic Committee

in Pyeongchang, South Korea 9-25 February 2018
- Competitors: 1 in 1 sport
- Flag bearer: Akwasi Frimpong (opening & closing)
- Medals: Gold 0 Silver 0 Bronze 0 Total 0

Winter Olympics appearances (overview)
- 2010; 2014; 2018; 2022; 2026

Ghana competed at the 2018 Winter Olympics in Pyeongchang, South Korea, from 9 to 25 February 2018. The country's participation in Pyeongchang marked its second participation in the Winter Olympics.

Ghana was represented by a lone athlete Akwasi Frimpong, who served as the country's flag-bearer during the opening and closing ceremony. Ghana did not win any medals in the Games, and has not won a Winter Olympics medal.

== Background ==
The Ghana Olympic Committee was recognized by the International Olympic Committee in 1951. The nation made its first Olympics appearance at the 1952 Summer Olympics under its colonial name of Gold coast. The current edition marked its second appearance at the Winter Olympics after its debut in 2010 Winter Olympics.

The 2018 Winter Olympics were held in Pyeongchang, South Korea between 9 and 25 February 2018. Ghana was represented by a lone athlete. Akwasi Frimpong served as the country's flag-bearer during the opening, and closing ceremony. Jerry Shaib Ahmed was the chef de mission of the Ghanaian delegate to the 2018 Winter Olympics. He did not win a medal.

== Competitors ==
Ghana was represented by a lone athlete in the Games.

| Sport | Men | Women | Total |
|---|---|---|---|
| Skeleton | 1 | 0 | 1 |
| Total | 1 | 0 | 1 |

== Skeleton ==
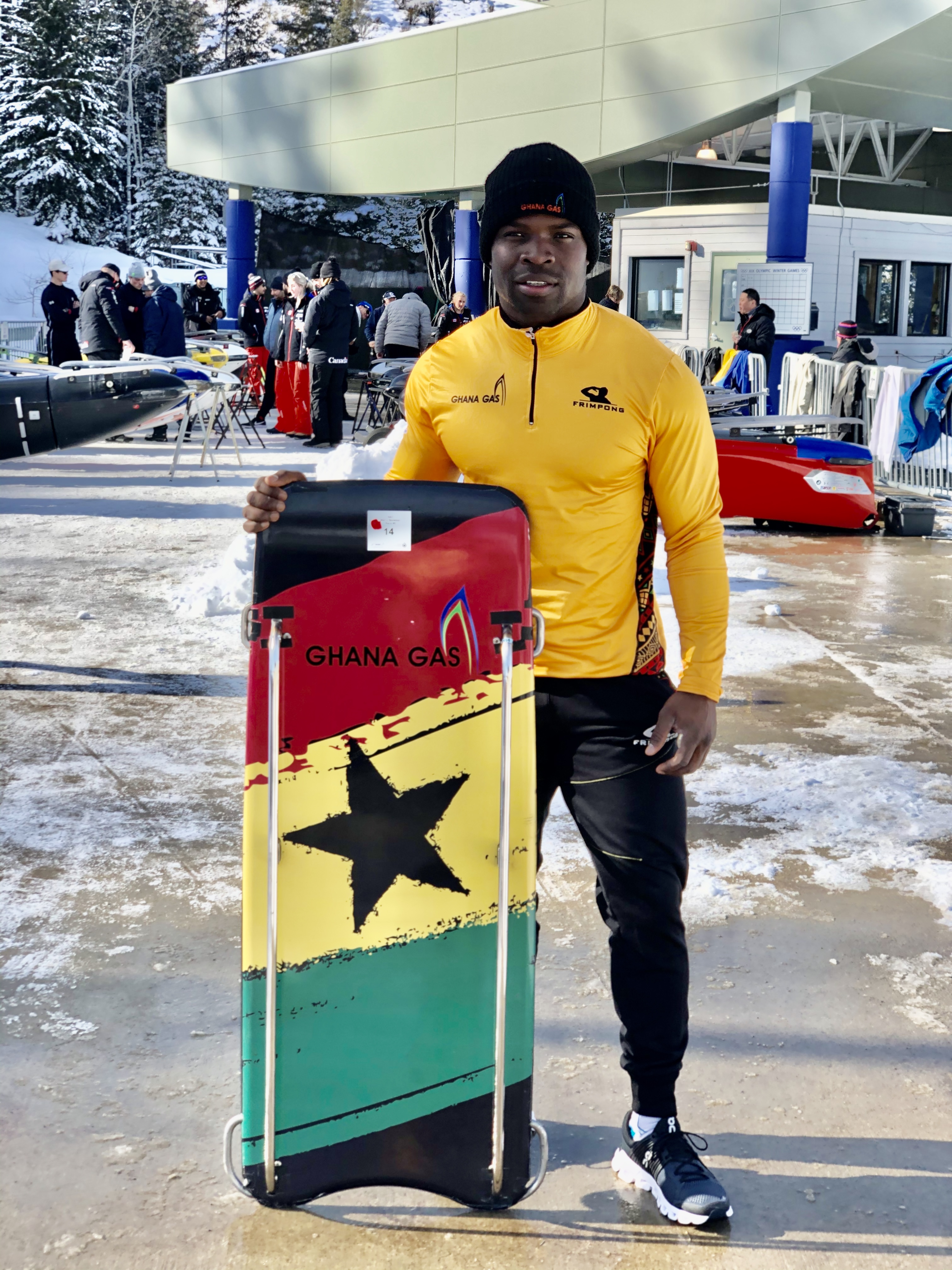
Akwasi Frimpong was the lone competitor for Ghana at the Games

Ghana qualified one male skeleton athlete. Akwasi Frimpong became the second Ghanaian to participate in the Winter Olympics after alpine skier Kwame Nkrumah-Acheampong participated in the 2010 edition in Vancouver. Frimpong was the first Olympian from West Africa to participate in the skeleton event as well as the first black Olympian to represent an African country in the sport. While the Ghana Olympic Committee (GOC) secured a monthly $1,500 allowance for Frimpong, Ghanaian chef de mission Ahmed looked for corporate sponsors to fund an additional $57,000 needed for Ghana's participation in the Games and reasoned that the Ghanaian government was already burdened due to time constraints. Local firm, "Cocoa from Ghana" donated $25,000 to the GOC.

In the main event, he was ranked 30th and last amongst all the competitors. He was ranked in the same position across his three runs, and was eliminated before the final run.

| Athlete | Event | Run 1 | | Run 2 | | Run 3 | | Run 4 | | Total | |
| Athlete | Event | Time | Rank | Time | Rank | Time | Rank | Time | Rank | Time | Rank |
|---|---|---|---|---|---|---|---|---|---|---|---|
| Akwasi Frimpong | Men's skeleton | 53.97 | 30 | 54.46 | 30 | 53.69 | 30 | Eliminated | | 2:42.12 | 30 |

== See also ==
- Ghana at the 2018 Summer Youth Olympics
- Ghana at the 2018 Commonwealth Games
