= Ghana at the 2004 Summer Olympics =

- IOC code: GHA
- NOC: Ghana Olympic Committee

in Athens
- Competitors: 26 in 2 sports
- Flag bearer: Andrew Owusu
- Medals: Gold 0 Silver 0 Bronze 0 Total 0

Summer Olympics appearances (overview)
- 1952; 1956; 1960; 1964; 1968; 1972; 1976–1980; 1984; 1988; 1992; 1996; 2000; 2004; 2008; 2012; 2016; 2020; 2024

Ghana was represented at the 2004 Summer Olympics in Athens, Greece by the Ghana Olympic Committee.

In total, 28 athletes including 23 men and three women represented Ghana in two different sports including athletics and football.

== Competitors ==
In total, 28 athletes represented Ghana at the 2004 Summer Olympics in Athens, Greece across two different sports.

Sport	Men	Women	Total
Athletics	7	3	10
Football	18	0	18
Total	25	3	28

== Athletics ==
In total, 10 Ghanaian athletes participated in the athletics events – Vida Anim, Ignisious Gaisah, Leonard Myles-Mills, Eric Nkansah, Christian Nsiah, Andrew Owusu, Akosua Serwaa, Margaret Simpson and Aziz Zakari.

The heats for the men's 100 m took place on 21 August 2004. Nkansah finished sixth in his heat in a time of 10.54 seconds and he did not advance to the quarter-finals. Zakari finished second in his heat in a time of 10.19 seconds and he advanced to the quarter-finals. Myles-Mills finished third in his heat in a time of 10.21 seconds and he advanced to the quarter-finals. The quarter-finals took place later the same day. Zakari finished first in his quarter-final in a time of 10.02 seconds and he advanced to the semi-finals. Myles-Mills finished third in his quarter-final in a time of 10.18 seconds and he advanced to the semi-finals. The semi-finals took place the following day. Zakari finished third in his semi-final in a time of 10.11 seconds and he advanced to the final. Myles-Mills finished sixth in his semi-final in a time of 10.22 seconds and he did not advance to the final. The final took place later the same day. Zakari did not finish.

The heats for the men's 200 m took place on 24 August 2004. Nsiah finished sixth in his heat in a time of 21.06 seconds and he did not advance to the quarter-finals.

The heats for the men's 4 x 100 m relay took place on 27 August 2004. Ghana finished sixth in their heat in a time of 38.88 seconds and did not advance to the final.

Athlete	Event	Heat		Quarterfinal		Semifinal		Final	
Athlete	Event	Result	Rank	Result	Rank	Result	Rank	Result	Rank
Leonard Myles-Mills	100 m	10.21	3 Q	10.18	3 Q	10.22	6	did not advance	
Eric Nkansah	100 m	10.54	6	did not advance					
Christian Nsiah	200 m	21.06	6	did not advance					
Aziz Zakari	100 m	10.19	2 Q	10.02	1 Q	10.11	3 Q	DNF	
Tanko Braimah; Leonard Myles-Mills; Christian Nsiah; Aziz Zakari	4 × 100 m relay	38.88	6	—				did not advance	

The qualifying round for the men's triple jump took place on 20 August 2004. Owusu contested qualifying group A. His best jump of 16.64 m came on his third and final attempt. However, he did not advance to the final and finished 19th overall.

The qualifying round for the men's long jump took place on 24 August 2004. Gaisah contested qualifying group A. His best jump of 8.05 m came on his third and final attempt and he advanced to the final by 1 cm. The final took place on 26 August 2004. Gaisah recorded his best jump of 8.24 cm in round four of the final as he finished sixth overall.

Athlete	Event	Qualification		Final	
Athlete	Event	Distance	Position	Distance	Position
Ignisious Gaisah	Long jump	8.05	12 q	8.24	6
Andrew Owusu	Triple jump	16.64	19	did not advance	

The heats for the women's 100 m took place on 20 August 2004. Anim finished first in her heat in a time of 11.14 seconds and she advanced to the quarter-finals. The quarter-finals took place later the same day. Anim did not finish.

The heats for the women's 800 m took place on 20 August 2004. Serwaa finished fifth in her heat in a time of two minutes 3.96 seconds and she did not advance to the semi-finals.

Athlete	Event	Heat		Quarterfinal		Semifinal		Final	
Athlete	Event	Result	Rank	Result	Rank	Result	Rank	Result	Rank
Vida Anim	100 m	11.14	1 Q	DNF		did not advance			
Akosua Serwaa	800 m	2:03.96	5	—		did not advance			

The heptathlon took place on 20 and 21 August 2004. Simpson scored a total of 6,253 points across the seven events and finished ninth overall.

Athlete	Event	100H	HJ	SP	200 m	LJ	JT	800 m	Final	Rank
Margaret Simpson	Result	13.56	1.79	12.41	24.62	6.02	53.32	2:17.72	6253	9
Margaret Simpson	Points	1041	966	688	922	856	925	856	6253	9

== Football ==
In total, 18 Ghanaian athletes participated in the football events – Mohammed Alhassan, Stephen Appiah, Charles Asampong Taylor, Yussif Chibsah, Daniel Coleman, Asamoah Gyan, Baffour Gyan, William Kwabena Tiero, Nasir Lamine, John Mensah, Emmanuel Osei, George Owu, John Paintsil, Emmanuel Pappoe, Razak Pimpong, Kwadwo Poku, Patrick Villars, Abubakari Yahuza in the men's tournament.

Pos	Team	Pld	W	D	L	GF	GA	GD	Pts	Qualification
1	Paraguay	3	2	0	1	6	5	+1	6	Qualified for the quarterfinals
2	Italy	3	1	1	1	5	5	0	4	Qualified for the quarterfinals
3	Ghana	3	1	1	1	4	4	0	4	
4	Japan	3	1	0	2	6	7	−1	3	

12 August 2004
20:30

Ghana	2 – 2	Italy
Pappoe 36'; Appiah 45+1'	Report	Pinzi 49'; Gilardino 83'

Panthessaliko Stadium, Volos
Attendance: 7,012
Referee: Horacio Elizondo (Argentina)

15 August 2004
20:30

Paraguay	1 – 2	Ghana
Gamarra 76'	Report	Tiero 81'; Appiah 84'

Kaftanzoglio Stadium, Thessaloniki
Attendance: 1,119
Referee: Benito Archundia (Mexico)

18 August 2004
20:30

Japan	1 – 0	Ghana
Okubo 37'	Report

Panthessaliko Stadium, Volos
Attendance: 6,813
Referee: Kyros Vassaras (Greece)
