= 2014 African Championships in Athletics – Women's triple jump =

Women's triple jump event held on August 14 on Stade de Marrakech

The women's triple jump event at the 2014 African Championships in Athletics was held on August 14 on Stade de Marrakech.

== Results ==
Rank	Athlete	Nationality	#1	#2	#3	#4	#5	#6	Result	Notes
1st place, gold medalist(s)	Joelle Mbumi Nkouindjin	Cameroon	12.83	13.69	12.98w	14.02	13.73	x	14.02	
2nd place, silver medalist(s)	Nadia Eke	Ghana	12.99	13.28	13.40w	x	13.18	x	13.40w	
3rd place, bronze medalist(s)	Blessing Ibrahim	Nigeria	13.28	13.35	13.10	11.82	12.99	12.67	13.35	
4	Linda Onana	Cameroon	12.94	x	12.93w	13.03	13.25	11.50w	13.25	
5	Mathilde Boateng	Ghana	x	x	12.87w	13.19	13.23w	13.15	13.23w	
6	Jihad Bakhechi	Morocco	12.68	12.88	x	x	12.67	12.83	12.88	
7	Jamaa Chnaik	Morocco	12.49	12.53	12.83	12.82w	12.46	x	12.83	
8	Sokhna Safietou Kante	Senegal	12.76w	12.53	12.44	12.58	12.46	12.13	12.76w	
9	Fatma Lahmedi	Tunisia	x	12.53	12.25				12.53	
10	Mariam Issifou	Benin	11.74	11.99	x				11.99	
