= Ghana at the 1972 Summer Olympics =

- IOC code: GHA
- NOC: Ghana Olympic Committee

in Munich
- Flag bearer: Sam Bugri
- Medals Ranked 43rd: Gold 0 Silver 0 Bronze 1 Total 1

Summer Olympics appearances (overview)
- 1952; 1956; 1960; 1964; 1968; 1972; 1976–1980; 1984; 1988; 1992; 1996; 2000; 2004; 2008; 2012; 2016; 2020; 2024

Ghana competed at the 1972 Summer Olympics in Munich, West Germany.

== Medalists ==
Medal	Name	Sport	Event
Bronze	Prince Amartey	Boxing	Men's Middleweight (75 kg)

== Results by event ==
=== Athletics ===
Men's 100 m:

- George Kofi Daniels

Heats — 10.65 s (did not advance)

Men's 200 m:

- George Kofi Daniels

1. Heats — 21.05 s
2. 2nd Round — 21.10 s (did not advance)

- James Addy

1. Heats — 21.06 s (did not advance)

- Sam Bugri

1. Heats — 47.83 s (did not advance)
2. 2nd Round — 47.34 s (did not advance)

Men's 1500 m:

- Billy Fordjour

1. Heats — 4:08.2 (did not advance)

Men's 3000 m steeplechase:

- Robert Hackman

1. Heats — 8:57.6 (did not advance)

Men's 4 × 100 m relay:

- Ohene Karikari, James Addy, Sandy Osei Agyeman and George Kofi Daniels

1. Heats — 39.46 s
2. 2nd Round — 39.99 s (did not advance)

Men's Long jump:

- Michael Ahey

1. Heat — 7.39 m (did not advance)

- Joshua Owusu

1. Heat — 7.93 m (did not advance)
2. Final — 8.01 m (4th place)

Men's Triple jump:

- Johnson Amoah

1. Heat — 15.84 m (did not advance)

- Moise Pomaney

1. Heat — 15.72 m (did not advance)

Women's 100 m

- Hannah Afriyie

1. Heat — 11.90 s
2. 2nd Round — 12.04 (did not advance)

- Alice Annum

1. Heat — 11.54 s
2. 2nd Round — 11.45 s
3. Semifinal — 11.47 s
4. Final — 11.41 s (6th place)

Alternate member

  - Juliana Ohemeng

=== Boxing ===
Bantamweight:

- Destimo Joe

1. 1/16-Final — Defeated Werner Schäfer of West Germany (3 — 2)
2. 1/8-Final — Lost to Ferry Egberty Moniaga of Indonesia (1 — 4)

Featherweight:

- Cofie Joe

1. 1/32-Final — Lost to Orlando Palacios of Cuba (1 — 4)

Light Welterweight:

- Lawson Odartey

1. 1/16-Final — Lost to Issaka Dabore of Niger (RSC, 3. RD)

Welterweight:

- Emma Flash Ankudey

1. 1/16-Final — Lost to Damdinjav Bandi of Mongolia (2 — 3)

Light middleweight:

- Ricky Barnor

1. 1/32-Final — Lost to Rolando Garbey of Cuba (0 — 5)

Middleweight:

- Prince Amartey → Bronze medal

1. 1/8-final — Defeat José Luis Espinosa of Mexico (5 — 0)
2. 1/4-final — Defeat Poul Knudsen of Denmark (3 — 2)
3. Semi-Final — Lost to Reima Virtanen of Finland (2 — 3)

=== Football ===
==== Men ====
- First Round (Group D)
August 28, 1972
12:00

East Germany	4–0	Ghana
Kreische 19' 89'; Streich 45'; Sparwasser 66'	Report

Olympic Stadium, Munich
Attendance: 40.000
Referee: Michael Wuertz (United States)

August 30, 1972
12:00

Poland	4–0	Ghana
Lubański 40'; Gadocha 59' 89'; Deyna 86'	Report

Regensburg
Attendance: 2.200
Referee: Kan-Chee Lee (Hong Kong)

September 1, 1972
12:00

Colombia	3–1	Ghana
Morón 56'; Torres 60'; Montano 82'	Report	Sunday 79'

Olympic Stadium, Munich
Attendance: 25.000
Referee: Kurt Tschenscher (West Germany)

==== Group D ====
	Pld	W	D	L	GF	GA	Pts
Poland	3	3	0	0	11	2	6
East Germany	3	2	0	1	11	3	4
Colombia	3	1	0	2	4	12	2
Ghana	3	0	0	3	1	10	0

- Team Roster

- Oliver Acquah
- Armah Akuetteh
- Edward Boye
- Abukari Caribah
- Joseph Derchie
- John Eshun
- Albert Essuman
- Henry Lante France
- Joe Ghartey
- Malik Jabir
- Osei Kofi
- Peter Lamptey
- Essel Badu Mensah
- Alex Mingle
- Clifford Odame
- Kwasi Owusu
- Joseph Sam
- Yaw Sam
- Ibrahim Sunday
