= Ghana at the 2012 Summer Olympics =

- IOC code: GHA
- NOC: Ghana Olympic Committee

in London
- Competitors: 9 in 4 sports
- Flag bearer: Maxwell Amponsah
- Medals: Gold 0 Silver 0 Bronze 0 Total 0

Summer Olympics appearances (overview)
- 1952; 1956; 1960; 1964; 1968; 1972; 1976–1980; 1984; 1988; 1992; 1996; 2000; 2004; 2008; 2012; 2016; 2020; 2024; 2028

Ghana competed at the 2012 Summer Olympics in London, from 27 July to 12 August 2012. This was the nation's thirteenth appearance at the Summer Olympics, having competed in all but three editions since 1952. Ghana did not attend the 1976 Olympics because of the African boycott and did not attend the 1980 Olympics because of the United States boycott.

The Ghana Olympic Committee sent a total of 9 athletes, 6 men and 3 women, to compete in 4 sports. This equaled the record number of Ghanaian athletes sent to the 2008 Olympics in Beijing, China. Five of the athletes on the team had not previously competed at the Olympic Games, while sprinter Vida Anim became the first Ghanaian female athlete to participate in a fourth Olympic Games. Alberta Ampomah became the first Ghanaian to compete in weightlifting at the Olympic Games. Heavyweight boxer and African champion Maxwell Amponsah, who later withdrew from the Games because of sustained injuries, was the nation's flag bearer at the opening ceremony. The Ghanaian team did not win any medals at the 2012 Olympics.

== Athletics ==
Ghanaian athletes achieved qualifying standards in the following athletics events (up to a maximum of three athletes in each event at the 'A' Standard, and one at the 'B' Standard):

Key

- Note – Ranks given for track events are within the athlete's heat only
- Q = Qualified for the next round
- q = Qualified for the next round as a fastest loser or, in field events, by position without achieving the qualifying target
- NR = National record
- N/A = Round not applicable for the event
- Bye = Athlete not required to compete in round

Men
Field events

Athlete	Event	Qualification		Final	
Athlete	Event	Distance	Position	Distance	Position
Ignisious Gaisah	Long jump	7.79	18	Did not advance	

Women
Track & road events

Athlete	Event	Heat		Semifinal		Final	
Athlete	Event	Result	Rank	Result	Rank	Result	Rank
Vida Anim	200 m	23.71	8	Did not advance			

Combined events – Heptathlon

Athlete	Event	100H	HJ	SP	200	LJ	JT	800	Final	Rank
Margaret Simpson	Result	Withdrew due to injury								
Margaret Simpson	Points	Withdrew due to injury								

== Boxing ==
Ghana qualified a total of four boxers. Heavyweight boxer Maxwell Amponsah withdrew from the Games after failing to recover from an injury sustained during a qualification match months before the competition.

Men

Athlete	Event	Round of 32	Round of 16	Quarterfinals	Semifinals	Final	
Athlete	Event	Opposition Result	Opposition Result	Opposition Result	Opposition Result	Opposition Result	Rank
Tetteh Sulemanu	Light flyweight	Ortíz (PUR); L 6–20	Did not advance				
Duke Akueteh Micah	Flyweight	Lavigilante (MRI); W 18–14	Conlan (IRL); L 8–19	Did not advance			
Isaac Zion Kojo Dogboe	Bantamweight	Shimizu (JPN); L 9–10	Did not advance				
Maxwell Amponsah	Heavyweight	—N/a	Retired				

== Judo ==
Athlete	Event	Round of 64	Round of 32	Round of 16	Quarterfinals	Semifinals	Repechage	Final / BM	
Athlete	Event	Opposition Result	Opposition Result	Opposition Result	Opposition Result	Opposition Result	Opposition Result	Opposition Result	Rank
Emmanuel Nartey	Men's −73 kg	Bye	Elmont (NED); L 0003–0111	Did not advance					

== Weightlifting ==
Ghana received one wildcard.

Athlete	Event	Snatch		Clean & Jerk		Total	Rank
Athlete	Event	Result	Rank	Result	Rank	Total	Rank
Alberta Ampomah	Women's +75 kg	73	14	101	12	174	13
