= Sulemanu Tetteh =

Ghanaian boxer (born 1992)

Personal information
- Born: 18 August 1992 (age 33) Accra, Ghana
- Height: 1.67 m (5 ft 6 in)
- Weight: 49 kg (108 lb)

Sport
- Sport: Boxing
- Weight class: Light Flyweight
- Club: Wisdom Boxing Club, Ghana
- Coached by: Asare Ofori
Medal record
Men's amateur boxing
Representing Ghana
African Championships
Silver medal – second place	2015 Casablanca	Light flyweight
ECOWAS Games
Gold medal – first place	2012 Accra	Light flyweight

Sulemanu Tetteh (born 18 August 1992) is a Ghanaian boxer. He competed in the Men's light flyweight division in the boxing at the 2012 Summer Olympics, losing in the first round to Jantony Ortíz of Puerto Rico. Commenting on the bout, he said, "I have experienced something from a champion". Earlier in 2012, he won the gold medal in the light flyweight division at the ECOWAS games.

He qualified to represent Ghana at the 2020 Summer Olympics.

== See also ==
- Ghana at the 2012 Summer Olympics

Olympic Games
Preceded by Akwasi Frimpong	Flag bearer for Ghana; 2020 Tokyo with Nadia Eke	Succeeded by Carlos Mäder
