= Table tennis at the 1992 Summer Olympics – Women's singles =

Table tennis at the Olympics

Table tennis – Women's singles at the Games of the XXV Olympiad
- Venue: Estació del Nord Sports Hall
- Date: 29 July to 5 August 1992
- Competitors: 62 from 38 nations

Medalists
1st place, gold medalist(s)		Deng Yaping	China
2nd place, silver medalist(s)		Qiao Hong	China
3rd place, bronze medalist(s)		Hyun Jung-hwa	South Korea
3rd place, bronze medalist(s)		Li Bun-hui	North Korea

These are the results of the women's singles competition, one of two events for female competitors in table tennis at the 1992 Summer Olympics in Barcelona.

== Group stage ==
=== Group A ===
Rank	Athlete	W	L	GW	GL	PW	PL	CHN	USA	CAN	JOR
1	Deng Yaping (CHN)	3	0	6	0	126	67	X	2–0	2–0	2–0
2	Insook Bhushan (USA)	2	1	4	2	110	89	0–2	X	2–0	2–0
3	Barbara Chiu (CAN)	1	2	2	4	104	96	0–2	0–2	X	2–0
4	Nadia Al-Hindi (JOR)	0	3	0	6	38	126	0–2	0–2	0–2	X

=== Group B ===
Rank	Athlete	W	L	GW	GL	PW	PL	CHN	ITA	GER	RSA
1	Qiao Hong (CHN)	3	0	6	1	144	92	X	2–0	2–1	2–0
2	Alessia Arisi (ITA)	2	1	4	2	123	89	0–2	X	2–0	2–0
3	Elke Schall-Wosik (GER)	1	2	3	4	120	123	1–2	0–2	X	2–0
4	Cheryl Roberts (RSA)	0	3	0	6	43	126	0–2	0–2	0–2	X

=== Group C ===
Rank	Athlete	W	L	GW	GL	PW	PL	KOR	SWE	SLO	TUN
1	Hyun Jung-Hwa (KOR)	3	0	6	0	126	56	X	2–0	2–0	2–0
2	Lotta Erlman (SWE)	2	1	4	2	105	83	0–2	X	2–0	2–0
3	Polona Frelih (SLO)	1	2	2	4	90	99	0–2	0–2	X	2–0
4	Feiza Ben Aïssa (TUN)	0	3	0	6	43	126	0–2	0–2	0–2	X

=== Group D ===
Rank	Athlete	W	L	GW	GL	PW	PL	PRK	GBR	EUN
1	Li Bun-Hui (PRK)	2	0	4	0	84	36	X	2–0	2–0
2	Alison Gordon (GBR)	1	1	2	2	59	74	0–2	X	2–0
3	Galina Melnik (EUN)	0	2	0	4	51	84	0–2	0–2	X

=== Group E ===
Rank	Athlete	W	L	GW	GL	PW	PL	CHN	JPN	INA	GHA
1	Chen Zihe (CHN)	3	0	6	0	126	62	X	2–0	2–0	2–0
2	Rika Sato (JPN)	2	1	4	2	118	76	0–2	X	2–0	2–0
3	Ling Ling Agustin (INA)	1	2	2	4	74	107	0–2	0–2	X	2–0
4	Patience Opokua (GHA)	0	3	0	6	53	126	0–2	0–2	0–2	X

=== Group F ===
Rank	Athlete	W	L	GW	GL	PW	PL	ROU	HKG	UGA
1	Emilia Elena Ciosu (ROU)	2	0	4	0	84	52	X	2–0	2–0
2	Chan Tan Lui (HKG)	1	1	2	2	74	52	0–2	X	2–0
3	Mary Musoke (UGA)	0	2	0	4	30	84	0–2	0–2	X

=== Group G ===
Rank	Athlete	W	L	GW	GL	PW	PL	HKG	KOR	AUS	TUN
1	Chai Po Wa (HKG)	3	0	6	1	148	81	X	2–1	2–0	2–0
2	Lee Jeong-im (KOR)	2	1	5	2	137	110	1–2	X	2–0	2–0
3	Kerri Tepper (AUS)	1	2	2	4	94	101	0–2	0–2	X	2–0
4	Sonia Touati (TUN)	0	3	0	6	39	126	0–2	0–2	0–2	X

=== Group H ===
Rank	Athlete	W	L	GW	GL	PW	PL	PRK	NZL	USA	GHA
1	Yu Sun-Bok (PRK)	3	0	6	0	126	70	X	2–0	2–0	2–0
2	Chunli Li (NZL)	2	1	4	2	116	68	0–2	X	2–0	2–0
3	Lily Hugh-Yip (USA)	1	2	2	4	81	108	0–2	0–2	X	2–0
4	Helen Amankwah (GHA)	0	3	0	6	49	126	0–2	0–2	0–2	X

=== Group I ===
Rank	Athlete	W	L	GW	GL	PW	PL	HUN	INA	GBR	ECU
1	Csilla Bátorfi (HUN)	3	0	6	0	126	71	X	2–0	2–0	2–0
2	Rossy Pratiwi Dipoyanti (INA)	2	1	4	3	121	112	0–2	X	2–1	2–0
3	Lisa Lomas (GBR)	1	2	3	4	113	116	0–2	1–2	X	2–0
4	María Cabrera (ECU)	0	3	0	6	65	126	0–2	0–2	0–2	X

=== Group J ===
Rank	Athlete	W	L	GW	GL	PW	PL	ROU	IOP	IND	CUB
1	Otilia Badescu (ROU)	3	0	6	0	127	70	X	2–0	2–0	2–0
2	Jasna Fazlić-Reed (IOP)	2	1	4	2	111	108	0–2	X	2–0	2–0
3	Niyati Roy-Shah (IND)	1	2	2	4	94	109	0–2	0–2	X	2–0
4	Marisel Ramírez (CUB)	0	3	0	6	81	126	0–2	0–2	0–2	X

=== Group K ===
Rank	Athlete	W	L	GW	GL	PW	PL	KOR	GER	USA	CHI
1	Hong Sun-hwa (KOR)	3	0	6	0	126	61	X	2–0	2–0	2–0
2	Olga Nemes (GER)	2	1	4	2	114	87	0–2	X	2–0	2–0
3	Diana Gee (USA)	1	2	2	4	94	103	0–2	0–2	X	2–0
4	Sofija Tepes (CHI)	0	3	0	6	43	126	0–2	0–2	0–2	X

=== Group L ===
Rank	Athlete	W	L	GW	GL	PW	PL	JPN	EUN	EGY	CUB
1	Mika Hoshino (JPN)	3	0	6	0	126	83	X	2–0	2–0	2–0
2	Valentina Popova (EUN)	2	1	4	2	112	91	0–2	X	2–0	2–0
3	Nihal Meshref (EGY)	1	2	2	4	97	116	0–2	0–2	X	2–0
4	Yolanda Rodríguez (CUB)	0	3	0	6	81	126	0–2	0–2	0–2	X

=== Group M ===
Rank	Athlete	W	L	GW	GL	PW	PL	PRK	FRA	HKG	ESP
1	Kim Hye-yong (PRK)	3	0	6	1	146	116	X	2–1	2–0	2–0
2	Xiaoming Wang-Dréchou (FRA)	2	1	5	2	141	111	1–2	X	2–0	2–0
3	Chan Suk Yuen (HKG)	1	2	2	4	103	119	0–2	0–2	X	2–0
4	Ana María Godes (ESP)	0	3	0	6	83	127	0–2	0–2	0–2	X

=== Group N ===
Rank	Athlete	W	L	GW	GL	PW	PL	NED	BUL	NGR	BRA
1	Bettine Vriesekoop (NED)	3	0	6	0	127	88	X	2–0	2–0	2–0
2	Daniela Gergelcheva (BUL)	2	1	4	3	136	120	0–2	X	2–0	2–1
3	Bose Kaffo (NGR)	1	2	2	5	128	139	0–2	0–2	X	2–1
4	Monica Doti (BRA)	0	3	2	6	120	164	0–2	1–2	1–2	X

=== Group O ===
Rank	Athlete	W	L	GW	GL	PW	PL	TCH	NED	ARG	BRA
1	Marie Hrachová (TCH)	3	0	6	1	142	93	X	2–1	2–0	2–0
2	Mirjam Hooman-Kloppenburg (NED)	2	1	5	2	142	112	1–2	X	2–0	2–0
3	Kim Hae-Ja (ARG)	1	2	2	4	94	116	0–2	0–2	X	2–0
4	Lyanne Kosaka (BRA)	0	3	0	6	69	126	0–2	0–2	0–2	X

=== Group P ===
Rank	Athlete	W	L	GW	GL	PW	PL	JPN	EUN	PER	NGR
1	Fumiyo Yamashita-Kaizu (JPN)	3	0	6	1	147	92	X	2–1	2–0	2–0
2	Elena Timina (EUN)	2	1	5	2	137	98	1–2	X	2–0	2–0
3	Eliana González (PER)	1	2	2	4	78	119	0–2	0–2	X	2–0
4	Abiola Odumosu (NGR)	0	3	0	6	74	127	0–2	0–2	0–2	X

== Knockout stage ==
First round
A1	Deng Yaping (CHN)	21	21	21
I1	Csilla Bátorfi (HUN)	14	12	15
P1	Fumiyo Kaizu (JPN)	10	21	21	15	11
H1	Yu Sun-Bok (PRK)	21	14	19	21	21
F1	Emilia Ciosu (ROU)	21	21	21
M1	Kim Hye-yong (PRK)	13	16	19
N1	Bettine Vriesekoop (NED)	12	10	10
C1	Hyun Jung-Hwa (KOR)	21	21	21
D1	Li Bun-Hui (PRK)	21	22	13	21
J1	Otilia Badescu (ROU)	19	20	21	17
L1	Mika Hoshino (JPN)	12	11	7
E1	Chen Zihe (CHN)	21	21	21
G1	Chai Po Wa (HKG)	21	21	21
O1	Marie Hrachová (TCH)	11	17	7
K1	Hong Soon-Hwa (KOR)	20	19	16
B1	Qiao Hong (CHN)	22	21	21

Quarterfinals
A1	Deng Yaping (CHN)	23	21	21
H1	Yu Sun-Bok (PRK)	21	16	17
F1	Emilia Ciosu (ROU)	9	21	21	11	14
C1	Hyun Jung-Hwa (KOR)	21	18	18	21	21
D1	Li Bun-Hui (PRK)	21	19	21	21
E1	Chen Zihe (CHN)	17	21	18	10
G1	Chai Po Wa (HKG)	13	20	14
B1	Qiao Hong (CHN)	21	22	21

Semifinals
A1	Deng Yaping (CHN)	21	21	21
C1	Hyun Jung-Hwa (KOR)	6	19	17
D1	Li Bun-Hui (PRK)	15	15	21	11
B1	Qiao Hong (CHN)	21	21	8	21

Gold medal match
A1	Deng Yaping (CHN)	21	21	15	23
B1	Qiao Hong (CHN)	6	8	21	21
