= Ghana at the 1984 Summer Olympics =

- IOC code: GHA
- NOC: Ghana Olympic Committee

in Los Angeles
- Competitors: 23
- Flag bearer: Makarios Djan
- Medals: Gold 0 Silver 0 Bronze 0 Total 0

Summer Olympics appearances (overview)
- 1952; 1956; 1960; 1964; 1968; 1972; 1976–1980; 1984; 1988; 1992; 1996; 2000; 2004; 2008; 2012; 2016; 2020; 2024

Ghana competed at the 1984 Summer Olympics in Los Angeles, United States. The nation returned to the Olympic Games after boycotting both the 1976 and 1980 Games.

== Results by event ==
=== Athletics ===
Men's 200 metres

- James Idun

- Heat — 22.55 (→ did not advance)

Men's 400 metres

- Charles Moses

- Heat — 50.39 (→ did not advance)

- Fred Owusu (→ did not compete)

Men's 4 × 100 metres relay

- Philip Attipoe, Makarios Djan, Collins Mensah, Rex Brobby

- Semi-final Heat 2 — 40.20 (→ did not advance)

Men's Long Jump

- Francis Dodoo

- Qualification — did not start (→ did not advance, no ranking)

=== Boxing ===
Men's Light Flyweight (– 48 kg)

- Michael Ebo Dankwa
  1. First Round — Lost to Yehuda Ben Haim (ISR), 1:4

Men's Bantamweight (– 54 kg)

- Amon Neequaye
  1. First Round — Bye
  2. Second Round — Lost to Ndaba Dube (ZIM), 0:5

Men's Featherweight (– 57 kg)

- Christian Kpakpo
  1. First Round — Bye
  2. Second Round — Lost to John Wanjau (KEN), 0:5

Men's Lightweight (– 60 kg)

- Douglas Odame
  1. First Round — Bye
  2. Second Round — Defeated Dieudonne Kossi (RCA), RSC-3
  3. Third Round — Lost to José Antonio Hernando (ESP), 0:5

Men's Light Middleweight (– 71 kg)

- Sullemana Sadik
  1. First Round — Bye
  2. Second Round — Lost to Christophe Tiozzo (FRA), 0:5

Men's Light Heavyweight (– 81 kg)

- Taju Akay
  1. First Round — Lost to Evander Holyfield (USA), RSC-3
