= Ghana at the 2016 Summer Olympics =

- IOC code: GHA
- NOC: Ghana Olympic Committee

in Rio de Janeiro
- Competitors: 14 in 5 sports
- Flag bearer: Flings Owusu-Agyapong
- Medals: Gold 0 Silver 0 Bronze 0 Total 0

Summer Olympics appearances (overview)
- 1952; 1956; 1960; 1964; 1968; 1972; 1976–1980; 1984; 1988; 1992; 1996; 2000; 2004; 2008; 2012; 2016; 2020; 2024

Ghana competed at the 2016 Summer Olympics in Rio de Janeiro, Brazil, from 5 to 21 August 2016. This was the nation's fourteenth appearance at the Summer Olympics, having taken part in all but three editions since its debut (as the Gold Coast) at the 1952 Summer Olympics. Ghana did not attend the 1976 Olympics because of the African boycott and did not attend the 1980 Olympics because of the United States boycott.

Ghana Olympic Committee sent the nation's largest delegation to the Games since 2004. A total of 14 athletes, seven per gender, were selected to the team for five different sports. Among the sports represented by the athletes, Ghana marked its Olympic debut in swimming, women's judo, and men's weightlifting.

Notable Ghanaian athletes on the squad were Hungarian-born judoka Szandra Szögedi, and freestyle swimmer Kaya Forson, who established a record as the youngest ever competitor (aged 14) in the nation's Olympic history. Javelin thrower John Ampomah was named the captain of the Ghanaian team, with track sprinter Flings Owusu-Agyapong leading the contingent as the nation's flag bearer in the opening ceremony.

Ghana, however, failed to earn a single medal in Rio de Janeiro, continuing a drought that began at the 1992 Summer Olympics in Barcelona, where the men's football team earned the bronze.

== Athletics (track and field) ==
Ghanaian athletes achieved qualifying standards in the following athletics events (up to a maximum of 3 athletes in each event):

Key

- Note–Ranks given for track events are within the athlete's heat only
- Q = Qualified for the next round
- q = Qualified for the next round as a fastest loser or, in field events, by position without achieving the qualifying target
- NR = National record
- N/A = Round not applicable for the event
- Bye = Athlete not required to compete in round

Track & road events
Men

Athlete	Event	Heat		Quarterfinal		Semifinal		Final	
Athlete	Event	Result	Rank	Result	Rank	Result	Rank	Result	Rank
Sean Safo-Antwi	100 m	Bye		10.43	6	Did not advance			
Emmanuel Dasor	200 m	20.65	6	—N/a		Did not advance			
Alex Amankwah	800 m	1:50.33	7	—N/a		Did not advance			

Women

Athlete	Event	Heat		Quarterfinal		Semifinal		Final	
Athlete	Event	Result	Rank	Result	Rank	Result	Rank	Result	Rank
Flings Owusu-Agyapong	100 m	Bye		11.43	4	Did not advance			
Janet Amponsah	200 m	23.67	6	—N/a		Did not advance			
Gemma Acheampong; Janet Amponsah; Beatrice Gyaman; Dorcas Gyimah; Flings Owusu-Agyapong	4 × 100 m relay	43.37	8	—N/a				Did not advance	

Field events

Athlete	Event	Qualification		Final	
Athlete	Event	Distance	Position	Distance	Position
John Ampomah	Men's javelin throw	80.39	19	Did not advance	

== Boxing ==
Ghana entered one boxer to compete in the men's bantamweight division into the Olympic competition. Abdul Omar received an unused Olympic spot as the next highest-ranked boxer at the 2016 African Boxing Olympic Qualification Tournament, as runner-up Mohamed Hamout of Morocco decided to accept his place instead in the World Series of Boxing (WSB) rankings.

Athlete	Event	Round of 32	Round of 16	Quarterfinals	Semifinals	Final	
Athlete	Event	Opposition Result	Opposition Result	Opposition Result	Opposition Result	Opposition Result	Rank
Abdul Omar	Men's bantamweight	Melián (ARG); L 0–3	Did not advance				

== Judo ==
Ghana qualified one judoka for the women's half-middleweight category (63 kg) at the Games. Hungarian-born Szandra Szögedi earned a continental quota spot from the African region as Ghana's top-ranked judoka outside of direct qualifying position in the IJF World Ranking List of May 30, 2016.

Athlete	Event	Round of 32	Round of 16	Quarterfinals	Semifinals	Repechage	Final / BM	
Athlete	Event	Opposition Result	Opposition Result	Opposition Result	Opposition Result	Opposition Result	Opposition Result	Rank
Szandra Szögedi	Women's −63 kg	M Silva (BRA); L 000–100	Did not advance					

== Swimming ==
Ghana received a Universality invitation from FINA to send two swimmers (one male and one female) to the Olympics, signifying the nation's Olympic debut in the sport.

Athlete	Event	Heat		Semifinal		Final	
Athlete	Event	Time	Rank	Time	Rank	Time	Rank
Abeiku Jackson	Men's 50 m freestyle	24.30	55	Did not advance			
Kaya Forson	Women's 200 m freestyle	2:16.02	42	Did not advance			

== Weightlifting ==
Ghana qualified one male weightlifter for the Rio Olympics by virtue of a top five national finish at the 2016 African Championships. The team allocated this place to 17-year-old Christian Amoah.

Athlete	Event	Snatch		Clean & Jerk		Total	Rank
Athlete	Event	Result	Rank	Result	Rank	Total	Rank
Christian Amoah	Men's −85 kg	130	18	153	21	283	21

== See also ==
- Ghana at the 2016 Summer Paralympics
