= Ghana at the 2024 Summer Olympics =

- IOC code: GHA
- NOC: Ghana Olympic Committee

in París, France 26 July 2024 – 11 August 2024
- Competitors: 7 (5 men and 2 women) in 2 sports
- Flag bearer (opening): Joseph Amoah & Rose Amoanimaa Yeboah
- Flag bearer (closing): Joseph Amoah & Rose Amoanimaa Yeboah
- Medals: Gold 0 Silver 0 Bronze 0 Total 0

Summer Olympics appearances (overview)
- 1952; 1956; 1960; 1964; 1968; 1972; 1976–1980; 1984; 1988; 1992; 1996; 2000; 2004; 2008; 2012; 2016; 2020; 2024

Ghana competed at the 2024 Summer Olympics in Paris, France from 26 July to 11 August 2024. It was the nation's sixteenth appearance at the Summer Olympics, having taken part in all but three editions since its debut (as the Gold Coast) in 1952. Ghana did not attend Montreal 1976 because of the African boycott, as well as the Moscow 1980, when the nation joined the United States-led boycott. Ghana failed to win its first Olympic medal, the first time since it earned its first and only bronze medal in the 2020 Summer Olympics as none of the athletes came close to an Olympic medal podium finish.

== Competitors ==
The following is the list of number of competitors in the Games.

Sport	Men	Women	Total
Athletics	4	1	5
Swimming	1	1	2
Total	5	2	7

== Athletics ==
Ghanaian track and field athletes achieved the entry standards for Paris 2024, either by passing the direct qualifying mark (or time for track and road races) or by world ranking, in the following events:

Key

- Note–Ranks given for track events are within the athlete's heat only
- Q = Qualified for the next round
- q = Qualified for the next round as a fastest loser or, in field events, by position without achieving the qualifying target
- NR = National record
- N/A = Round not applicable for the event
- Bye = Athlete not required to compete in round

Track & road events

Athlete	Event	Heat		Semifinal		Final	
Athlete	Event	Result	Rank	Result	Rank	Result	Rank
Benjamin Azamati	Men's 100 m	10.08	2 Q	10.17	9	Did not advance	
Abdul-Rasheed Saminu	Men's 100 m	10.06	3 Q	10.05	7	Did not advance	
Joseph Paul Amoah; Benjamin Azamati; Ibrahim Fuseini; Abdul-Rasheed Saminu	Men's 4 × 100 m relay	DQ		—		Did not advance	

Field events

Athlete	Event	Qualification		Final	
Athlete	Event	Distance	Position	Distance	Position
Rose Amoanimaa Yeboah	Women's high jump	1.88	25	Did not advance	

== Swimming ==
Ghana sent two swimmers to compete at the 2024 Paris Olympics.

Athlete	Event	Heat		Semifinal		Final	
Athlete	Event	Time	Rank	Time	Rank	Time	Rank
Harry Stacey	Men's 100 m freestyle	51.12	52	Did not advance			
Joselle Mensah	Women's 50 m freestyle	26.81	36	Did not advance			
