= Ghana at the 1960 Summer Olympics =

- IOC code: GHA
- NOC: Ghana Olympic Committee

in Rome
- Competitors: 15 in 2 sports
- Medals Ranked 32nd: Gold 0 Silver 1 Bronze 0 Total 1

Summer Olympics appearances (overview)
- 1952; 1956; 1960; 1964; 1968; 1972; 1976–1980; 1984; 1988; 1992; 1996; 2000; 2004; 2008; 2012; 2016; 2020; 2024

Ghana competed at the 1960 Summer Olympics in Rome, Italy, for the first time as an independent nation. Previously, the Gold Coast had competed at the 1952 Summer Olympics. In total, 15 athletes competing in 2 sports represented Ghana.

== Medalists ==
Ghana won its first ever Olympic medal at these Games.

Medal	Name	Sport	Event
Silver	Clement Quartey	Boxing	Men's Light Welterweight (63.5 kg)

== Athletics ==
Key

- Note–Ranks given for track events are within the athlete's heat only
- Q = Qualified for the next round
- q = Qualified for the next round as a fastest loser or, in field events, by position without achieving the qualifying target
- N/A = Round not applicable for the event
- Bye = Athlete not required to compete in round

Men

Track & road events

Athlete	Event	Heat		Quarterfinal		Semifinal		Final	
Athlete	Event	Result	Rank	Result	Rank	Result	Rank	Result	Rank
Gustav Ntiforo	100 m	11.15	4	did not advance					
Michael Okantey	200 m	21.91	3	did not advance					
John Asare-Antwi	400 m	47.81	5	did not advance					
Frederick Owusu	800 m	1:55.41	5	did not advance					
William Quaye; James Addy; Frederick Owusu; John Asare-Antwi	4 × 400 m relay	3:10.62	2 Q	—		3:11.03	5	did not advance	

Field events

Athlete	Event	Qualification		Final	
Athlete	Event	Distance	Position	Distance	Position
Robert Kotei	High jump	2.00	=4 q	2.03	10

== Boxing ==
Athlete	Event	Round 1	Round of 32	Round of 16	Quarterfinals	Semifinals	Final	
Athlete	Event	Opposition Result	Opposition Result	Opposition Result	Opposition Result	Opposition Result	Opposition Result	Rank
Isaac Aryee	Flyweight	Bye	Tanabe (JPN); L 0-5	did not advance				
Joshua Williams	Featherweight	Gheorghiu (ROU); L 1-4	did not advance					
Eddie Blay	Lightweight	Bye	Gutiérrez (URU); W 4-1	McTaggart (GBR); L 0-5	did not advance			
Clement Quartey	Light welterweight	Bye	Boubekeur (MAR); W 5-0	Al-Karkhi (IRQ); W 5-0	Kim (KOR); W 3-2	Kasprzyk (POL); W WO	Němeček (TCH); L 0-5	2nd place, silver medalist(s)
Joseph Lartey	Welterweight	Bye	Bergström (SWE); W 5-0	Radonyak (URS); L KO	did not advance			
Alhassan Brimah	Light Middleweight	Bye	Lagutin (URS); L KO	did not advance				
