= Ghana at the 2008 Summer Olympics =

- IOC code: GHA
- NOC: Ghana Olympic Committee

in Beijing
- Competitors: 9 in 2 sports
- Flag bearer: Vida Anim
- Medals: Gold 0 Silver 0 Bronze 0 Total 0

Summer Olympics appearances (overview)
- 1952; 1956; 1960; 1964; 1968; 1972; 1976–1980; 1984; 1988; 1992; 1996; 2000; 2004; 2008; 2012; 2016; 2020; 2024

Ghana competed in the 2008 Summer Olympics held in Beijing, People's Republic of China from August 8 to August 24, 2008.

== Athletics ==
Men

Athlete	Event	Heat		Quarterfinal		Semifinal		Final	
Athlete	Event	Result	Rank	Result	Rank	Result	Rank	Result	Rank
Seth Amoo	200 m	20.91	4	Did not advance					
Aziz Zakari	100 m	10.34	4 q	10.24	5	Did not advance			

Women

Athlete	Event	Heat		Quarterfinal		Semifinal		Final	
Athlete	Event	Result	Rank	Result	Rank	Result	Rank	Result	Rank
Vida Anim	100 m	11.47	2 Q	11.32	3 Q	11.51	8	Did not advance	
Vida Anim	200 m	DNS		Did not advance					

Key

- Note–Ranks given for track events are within the athlete's heat only
- Q = Qualified for the next round
- q = Qualified for the next round as a fastest loser or, in field events, by position without achieving the qualifying target
- NR = National record
- N/A = Round not applicable for the event
- Bye = Athlete not required to compete in round

== Boxing ==
Ghana qualified six boxers for the Olympic boxing tournament. Manyo Plange and Ahmed Saraku qualified at the first African qualifying tournament. The other four Ghanaian boxers qualified at the second African continental qualifying tournament.

Athlete	Event	Round of 32	Round of 16	Quarterfinals	Semifinals	Final	
Athlete	Event	Opposition Result	Opposition Result	Opposition Result	Opposition Result	Opposition Result	Rank
Manyo Plange	Light flyweight	Tañamor (PHI); W 6–3	Carvalho (BRA); L 12–21	Did not advance			
Issah Samir	Bantamweight	Manzanilla (VEN); L 10–13	Did not advance				
Prince Dzanie	Featherweight	Torriente (CUB); L 2–11	Did not advance				
Samuel Kotey Neequaye	Light welterweight	Saunders (GBR); L 1–24 KO	Did not advance				
Ahmed Saraku	Middleweight	Hakobyan (ARM); L 8–14	Did not advance				
Bastir Samir	Light heavyweight	Izobo (NGR); W RSC	Silva (BRA); L 7–9	Did not advance			
