= Ghana at the 1968 Summer Olympics =

- IOC code: GHA
- NOC: Ghana Olympic Committee

in Mexico City
- Medals: Gold 0 Silver 0 Bronze 0 Total 0

Summer Olympics appearances (overview)
- 1952; 1956; 1960; 1964; 1968; 1972; 1976–1980; 1984; 1988; 1992; 1996; 2000; 2004; 2008; 2012; 2016; 2020; 2024; 2028

Ghana competed at the 1968 Summer Olympics in Mexico City, Mexico.

== Results by event ==
=== Athletics ===
Men's 100 metres

- Michael Ahey

- Round 1 — 10.5 s (→ 3rd in heat, advanced to round 2)
- Round 2 — 10.4 s (→ 8th in heat, did not advance)

Women's 200 metres

- Alice Anum

- Round 1 — 23.9 s (→ 7th in heat, did not advance)

Men's 400 metres

- Samuel Bugri

- Round 1 — 45.8 s (→ 4th in heat, advanced to round 2)
- Round 2 — 46.0 s (→ 4th in heat, advanced to semi final)
- Semi final — 45.9 s (→ 5th in heat, did not advance)

Men's 800 metres

- John Ametepey

- Round 1 — 1:50.7 min (→ 4th in heat, did not advance)

Men's 400 metres hurdles

- William Quaye

- Round 1 — 51.6 s (→ 6th in heat, did not advance)

Men's 4×100 metres relay

- Edward Owusu, Michael Ahey, William Quaye, James Addy

- Round 1 — 39.8 s (→ 6th in heat, semi final)
- Semi final — 39.9 s (→ 5th in heat, did not advance)

Men's long jump

- Michael Ahey

- Qualification — 7.77 m (→ advanced to the final)
- Final — 7.71 m (→ 13th place)

- Johnson Amoah

- Qualification — DNS (→ did not advance)

Women's long jump

- Alice Anum

- Qualification — 5.61 m (→ advanced to the final)

Men's triple jump

- Johnson Amoah

- Qualification — 15.65 m (→ did not advance)

=== Boxing ===
Light flyweight (48 kg)

- Joseph Destimo

- Round of 16 — Beat Walter Henry of Canada
- Quarterfinal — Lost to Servilio Oliveira of Brazil

Bantamweight (54 kg)

- Sulley Shittu

- Round 1 — Beat Dary Dasuda of Niger
- Round 2 — Beat Gyula Szabó of Hungary
- Round of 16 - Lost to Horst Rascher of West Germany

Lightweight (60 kg)

- Joe Martey

- Round 1 — Lost to Enzo Petriglia of Italy

Light welterweight (63.5 kg)

- Emmanuel Lawson

- Round 2 — Lost to Jaime Lozano of Mexico

Welterweight (67 kg)

- Aaron Popoola

- Round 2 — Lost to Celal Sandal of Turkey

Light middleweight (71 kg)

- Prince Amartey

- Round 1 — Beat Abdalla Abdel of Sudan
- Round of 16 — Lost to Eric Blake of Great Britain

Middleweight (75 kg)

- George Aidoo

- Round of 16 — DNS

Heavyweight (81 kg)

- Adonis Ray

- Round of 16 — Lost to Joaquin Rocha of Mexico

=== Football (soccer) ===
Men

- Preliminary Round (Group C)

1968-10-13
12:00

Israel	5 – 3	Ghana
Spiegel 11' 75'; Feigenbaum 16' 30' 70'	Report	Jabir 18' 79'; Amosa 35'

Estadio Nou Camp, León
Referee: Michel Kitabdjian (France)

1968-10-15
12:00

Hungary	2 – 2	Ghana
A. Dunai 15'; Menczel 17'	Report	Sunday 12'; Sampene 33'

Estadio Jalisco, Guadalajara
Referee: Yoshiyuki Maruyama (Japan)

1968-10-17
12:00

El Salvador	1 – 1	Ghana
Rodríguez 42'	Report	Kofi 55'

Estadio Nou Camp, León
Referee: Mariano Medina Iglesias (Spain)

Team	Pld	W	D	L	GF	GA	GD	Pts
Hungary	3	2	1	0	8	2	+6	5
Israel	3	2	0	1	8	6	+2	4
Ghana	3	0	2	1	6	8	−2	2
El Salvador	3	0	1	2	2	8	−6	1

- Team roster

- ( 1.) ?
- ( 2.) ?
- ( 3.) ?
- ( 4.) John Eshun
- ( 5.) Charles Addo
- ( 6.) Ibrahim Sunday
- ( 7.) Osei Kofi
- ( 8.) Jones Atuquayefio
- ( 9.) George Alhassan
- (10.) Gbadamosi Amusa
- (11.) Sammy Sampene
- (12.) ?
- (13.) John Naawu
- (14.) Joseph Wilson
- (15.) Jabir Malik
- (16.) Oliver Acquah
- (17.) Jonathan Kpakpo
- (18.) George Foley
- Gariba Abukari
- Bernard Kusi
