= María Cabrera =

Ecuadorian table tennis player

Personal information
- Full name: María Patricia Cabrera
- Nationality: Ecuadorian
- Born: 28 August 1972 (age 53) Guayaquil, Ecuador

Sport
- Sport: Table tennis
Medal record
Women's table tennis
Representing Ecuador
| Bronze medal – third place | 1987 Indianapolis | Doubles |
| Gold medal – first place | 1989 Maracaibo | Single |

María Patricia Cabrera (born 28 August 1972) is a former Ecuadorian table tennis player. Born in Guayaquil, Cabrera won several titles during her career and became the first Ecuadorian table tennis player to compete in the Olympics, participating in the women's singles event at the 1992 Summer Olympics.

== Biography ==
María Cabrera was born on 28 August 1972 in Guayaquil, Ecuador.

She competed at the 1987 Pan American Games in Indianapolis, Indiana, winning a bronze medal in doubles with Betty Guamancela. She also competed at the 1989 World Table Tennis Championships in Dortmund, Germany, where she advanced to the main draw, becoming the first Ecuadorian to do so. She was the last to do so until Alberto Miño in the 2015 World Table Tennis Championships.

The 1992 Summer Olympics were held in Barcelona, Spain, from 24 July to 9 August. Cabrera was the first Ecuadorian table tennis player to compete for the Olympics, and was the last to do so until Alberto Miño qualified for the 2021 Summer Olympics. She competed in the women's single and was seeded into Group I. Group I's games took place from 29 July to 31 July 1992. In all three games, Cabrera lost 2-0, the first against Csilla Bátorfi from Hungary, the second against Rossy Pratiwi Dipoyanti from Indonesia, and the third against Lisa Lomas from the United Kingdom. She finished last in her group and was ranked 49th overall.

In 2000, she was awarded the Golden Condor (Spanish: Cóndor de Oro) by sports magazine Estadio, an award given to "the best athletes of the year." She was described by the Ecuadorian Table Tennis Federation as "an Ecuadorian table tennis legend".

Cabrera currently resides in the Netherlands with her son.
