= Magaly Montes =

Peruvian table tennis player

Personal information
- Nationality: Peruvian
- Born: 10 February 1968 (age 57)

Sport
- Sport: Table tennis

Magaly Montes (born 10 February 1968) is a Peruvian table tennis player. She competed in the women's doubles event at the 1992 Summer Olympics.
