= Alejandra Gabaglio =

Argentine table tennis player (born 1966)

Personal information
- Born: 17 October 1966 (age 59) Buenos Aires, Argentina

Sport
- Sport: Table tennis

Alejandra Gabaglio (born 17 October 1966) is an Argentine table tennis player. She competed in the women's doubles event at the 1992 Summer Olympics.
