= Ghana at the 2022 Winter Olympics =

- Flag of Ghana
- IOC code: GHA
- NOC: Ghana Olympic Committee

in Beijing, China 4–20 February 2022
- Competitors: 1 in 1 sport
- Flag bearer (opening): Carlos Mäder
- Flag bearer (closing): Volunteer
- Medals: Gold 0 Silver 0 Bronze 0 Total 0

Winter Olympics appearances (overview)
- 2010; 2014; 2018; 2022; 2026

Ghana competed at the 2022 Winter Olympics in Beijing, China. The 2022 Winter Olympics were held from 4 to 20 February 2022.

Ghana's team consisted of one male alpine skier, marking the country's return to the sport for the first time since 2010. Alpine skier Carlos Mäder was also the country's flagbearer during the opening ceremony. Meanwhile, a volunteer was the flagbearer during the closing ceremony.

== Competitors ==
The following is the list of number of competitors at the Games per sport/discipline.

Sport	Men	Women	Total
Alpine skiing	1	0	1
Total	1	0	1

== Alpine skiing ==
Carlos Mäder met the basic qualification standards meaning that Ghana qualified one male alpine skier. Mäder was born in Ghana, but was adopted by Swiss parents and has resided in Switzerland for most of his life. Mäder was the oldest alpine skier at the games, and did not finish his only event, the men's giant slalom.

Athlete	Event	Run 1		Run 2		Total	
Athlete	Event	Time	Rank	Time	Rank	Time	Rank
Carlos Mäder	Men's giant slalom	DNF		Did not advance			

== See also ==
- Tropical nations at the Winter Olympics
- Ghana at the 2022 Commonwealth Games
