= Gloria Gauchia =

Spanish table tennis player

Personal information
- Nationality: Spanish
- Born: 4 September 1972 (age 52); Girona, Spain

Sport
- Sport: Table tennis

Gloria Gauchia (born 4 September 1972) is a Spanish table tennis player. She competed in the women's doubles event at the 1992 Summer Olympics.
