= Cheryl Roberts (table tennis) =

South African table tennis player (1962–2022)

Personal information
- Nationality: South African
- Born: 10 March 1962
- Died: 7 October 2022 (aged 60)

Sport
- Sport: Table tennis

Cheryl Roberts (10 March 1962 – 7 October 2022) was a South African table tennis player. She competed in the women's singles event at the 1992 Summer Olympics. Roberts died from cancer on 7 October 2022, at the age of 60.
