= Jaroslava Mihočková =

Slovak table tennis player

Personal information
- Nationality: Slovak
- Born: 12 June 1971 (age 53); Bratislava, Czechoslovakia

Sport
- Sport: Table tennis

Jaroslava Mihočková (born 12 June 1971) is a Slovak table tennis player. She competed in the women's doubles event at the 1992 Summer Olympics.
