= Nasir Lamine =

Ghanaian footballer

Lamine Nasir
Personal information
- Date of birth: 7 February 1985 (age 41)
- Place of birth: Ghana
- Height: 1.78 m (5 ft 10 in)
- Position: Central midfielder

Team information
- Current team: New Edubiase United

Senior career*
Years	Team	Apps	(Gls)
2007	Ashanti Gold SC		
2012–	New Edubiase United		

International career
2004	Ghana U-23	1	(0)
- * Club domestic league appearances and goals

Nasir Lamine (born 7 February 1985) is a Ghanaian footballer who plays for New Edubiase United. He previously played for Ashanti Gold SC (Ashgold). Lamine was part of his country's 2004 Olympic football team; the team exited in the first round, having finished in third place in Group B.
