= Ghana at the 1988 Summer Olympics =

- IOC code: GHA
- NOC: Ghana Olympic Committee

in Seoul
- Competitors: 16 in 3 sports
- Flag bearer: John Myles-Mills
- Medals: Gold 0 Silver 0 Bronze 0 Total 0

Summer Olympics appearances (overview)
- 1952; 1956; 1960; 1964; 1968; 1972; 1976–1980; 1984; 1988; 1992; 1996; 2000; 2004; 2008; 2012; 2016; 2020; 2024

Ghana competed at the 1988 Summer Olympics in Seoul, South Korea. Thanks to in order of using the traditional Korean Hangul alphabet, Ghana was second in the parade of nations following Greece, which has traditionally led the march since 1928.

== Competitors ==
The following is the list of number of competitors in the Games.

Sport	Men	Women	Total
Athletics	6	5	11
Boxing	4	–	4
Table tennis	0	1	1
Total	10	6	16

== Athletics ==
Men
Track and road events

Athlete	Event	Heat Round 1		Heat Round 2		Semifinal		Final	
Athlete	Event	Time	Rank	Time	Rank	Time	Rank	Time	Rank
John Myles-Mills	100 metres	10.31	6 Q	10.21	7 Q	10.43	14	Did not advance	
Emmanuel Tuffour	100 metres	10.31	6 Q	10.37	20	Did not advance			
John Myles-Mills	200 metres	21.04	20 q	20.95	23	Did not advance			
John Myles-Mills; Eric Akogyiram; Salaam Gariba; Nelson Boateng; Emmanuel Tuffour (*)	4 × 100 metres relay	39.13	5 Q	—		39.46	12	Did not advance	

Field events

Athlete	Event	Qualification		Final	
Athlete	Event	Distance	Position	Distance	Position
Francis Dodoo	Triple jump	16.17	17	Did not advance	

Women
Track and road events

Athlete	Event	Heat Round 1		Heat Round 2		Semifinal		Final	
Athlete	Event	Time	Rank	Time	Rank	Time	Rank	Time	Rank
Dinah Yankey	100 metres	11.64	32 q	11.63	29	Did not advance			
Dinah Yankey	100 metres hurdles	13.64	25	Did not advance					
Veronica Bawuah; Dinah Yankey; Mercy Addy; Martha Appiah	4 × 100 metres relay	44.12	12 q	—		44.30	13	Did not advance	

Field events

Athlete	Event	Qualification		Final	
Athlete	Event	Distance	Position	Distance	Position
Juliana Yendork	Long jump	5.40	27	Did not advance	

== Boxing ==
Athlete	Event	Round of 64	Round of 32	Round of 16	Quarterfinals	Semifinals	Final	
Athlete	Event	Opposition Result	Opposition Result	Opposition Result	Opposition Result	Opposition Result	Opposition Result	Rank
Alfred Kotey	Flyweight	Bye	Al-Mutairi (KUW); W RSC R1	Mwangata (TAN); W 5–0	González (MEX); L Walkover	Did not advance		
Ike Quartey	Light welterweight	Bye	Saizozema (DOM); W 5–0	Cheney (AUS); L 0–5	Did not advance			
Alfred Ankamah	Welterweight	Simbeye (MAW); W KO	Gould (USA); L 0–5	Did not advance				
Emmanuel Quaye	Light middleweight	Mercado (ECU); L KO	Did not advance					

== Table tennis ==
Women

Athlete	Event	Group Stage						Round of 16	Quarterfinal	Semifinal	Final	
Athlete	Event	Opposition Result	Opposition Result	Opposition Result	Opposition Result	Opposition Result	Rank	Opposition Result	Opposition Result	Opposition Result	Opposition Result	Rank
Patricia Offel	Singles	Li (CHN); L 0–3	Tepper (AUS); L 1–3	Mok (HKG); L 0–3	Lau (MAS); L 1–3	Ishida (JPN); L 0–3	6	Did not advance				
