= Carlos Mäder =

Ghanaian-Swiss ski racer

Carlos Mäder (born 23 October 1978 in Cape Coast, Ghana), also known as Kojo Benya Brown, is a Ghanaian-Swiss alpine ski racer. In January 2022, he qualified for the 2022 Winter Olympics representing Ghana. He competes primarily in slalom and giant slalom.

Olympic Games
Preceded by Nadia Eke; Sulemanu Tetteh	Flag bearer for Ghana; Beijing 2022	Succeeded by Joseph Amoah; Rose Amoanimaa Yeboah
