= Nadia Eke =

Ghanaian triple jumper (born 1993)

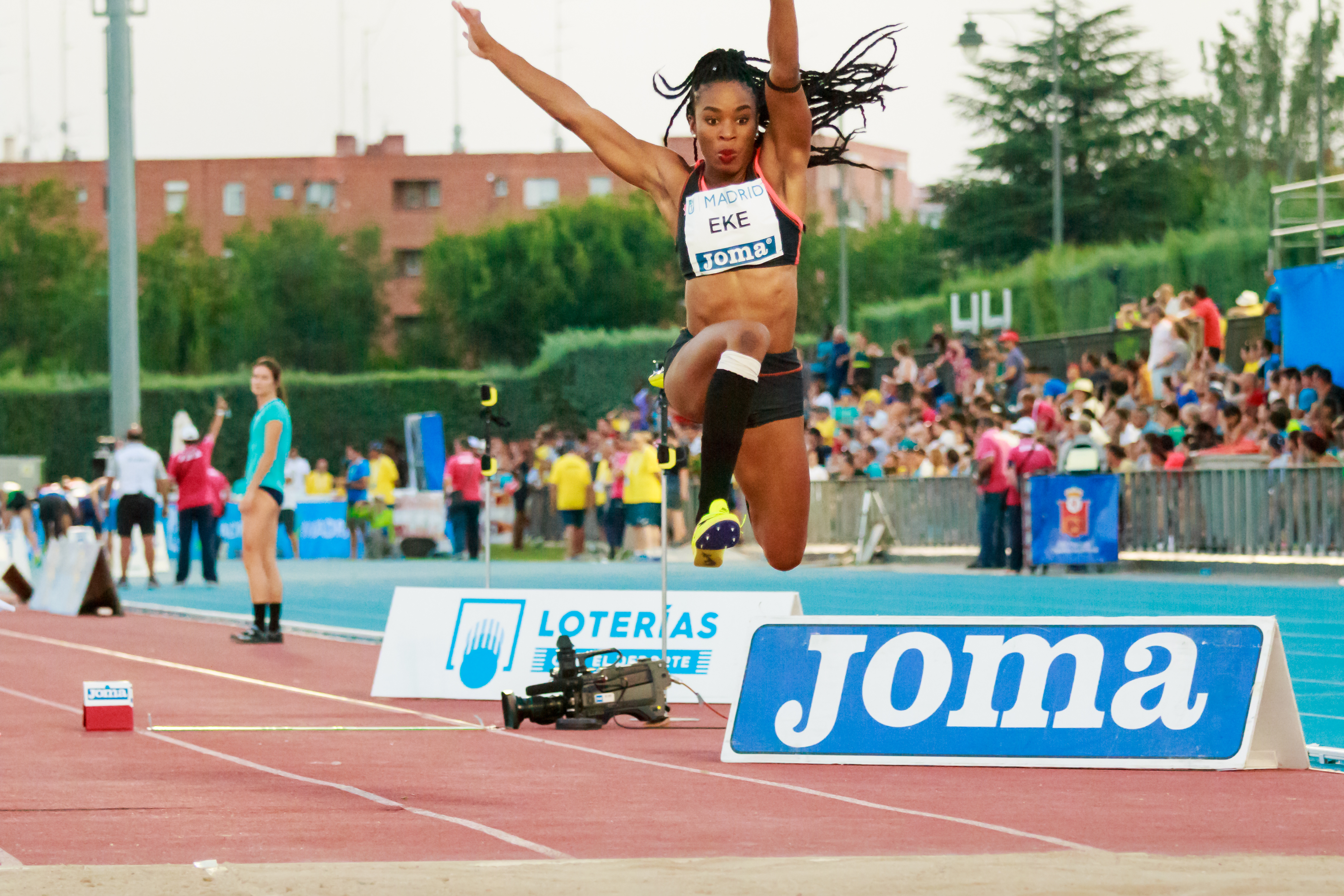
- Nadia Eke jumping during the IAAF World Challenge Meeting Madrid 2017.

Personal information
- Born: 11 January 1993 (age 33) Accra, Ghana
- Education: Columbia University

Sport
- Sport: Track and field
- Event: Triple Jump
- College team: Columbia Lions
Medal record
Women's athletics
Representing Ghana
African Games
Bronze medal – third place	2015 Brazzaville	Triple jump
African Championships
Gold medal – first place	2016 Durban	Triple jump
Silver medal – second place	2014 Marrakesh	Triple jump

Nadia Eke (born 11 January 1993) is a Ghanaian triple jumper. She is the 2016 African champion and the Ghanaian record holder with 14.33 metres.

== Education ==
Eke graduated from Columbia University in 2015.

== Career ==
She was a sub-13 metre jumper until March 2014, when she reached 13.09 metres and won the Ivy League Indoor Championships in Hanover. Two weeks later she finished sixth at the NCAA Division I Women's Indoor Championships. During the outdoor season, she finished tenth at the 2014 Commonwealth Games, where she recorded 12.98 after jumping 13.14 in the qualifying round. She improved to 13.28 at the 2014 African Championships in Marrakesh, where she won the silver medal in a wind-assisted 13.40. She then jumped 13.28 again to finish seventh at the 2014 IAAF Continental Cup.

In 2015 she almost exclusively passed the 13-metre barrier, first winning the New York Armory Track Invitational and the Ivy League Heptagonal before finishing third at the NCAA Division I Women's Indoor Championships. She jumped 13.32 at the two latter competitions, followed by a wind-assisted 13.46 metres at the 2015 NCAA Division I Outdoor Championships, where she finished fifth, and 13.40 metres at the 2015 African Games where she won bronze.

Steady improvements in 2016 to 13.49, 13.52, 13.75 and 13.82 metres in US competitions were crowned with Eke winning the 2016 African Championship. Her form in 2017 saw a spike in May, when she jumped 13.93 metres in Saint Martin, followed by four competitions in the Caribbean and Florida between 13.76 and 13.88 metres. She was not able to repeat that at the 2017 World Championships where she bowed out in the qualification. At the 2018 Commonwealth Games she only managed 13.05, finishing tenth.

2019 saw Nadia Eke competing sparingly during the spring, before achieving a lifetime best of 14.33 metres at the Racers Grand Prix in Kingston, Jamaica. She thereby qualified to represent Ghana at the 2020 Summer Olympics, where she was also the flagbearer at the 2020 Summer Olympics Parade of Nations.

She missed the 2019 World Championships as well as the entire 2020 season. Returning in 2021, she barely cleared 13 metres during pre-Olympic competitions and got no mark at the 2020 Summer Olympic Games.

Her personal best jump of 14.33 metres is still the Ghanaian record. She also has 6.17 metres in the long jump, achieved in April 2017 in Trenton, New Jersey.

Olympic Games
Preceded by Akwasi Frimpong	Flag bearer for Ghana; 2020 Tokyo with Sulemanu Tetteh	Succeeded by Carlos Mäder
