= Dramani Kalilu =

Ghanaian footballer

Personal information
- Date of birth: 21 October 1972 (age 53)

Medal record

Men's association football

Representing Ghana

Olympic Games
Bronze medal – third place	1992 Barcelona	Team competition

Mohammed Dramani Kalilu (born 21 October 1972) is a football player from Ghana. He was a member of the Men's National Team that won the bronze medal at the 1992 Summer Olympics in Barcelona, Spain. He played as a defender.
