= Maria Bogoslov =

Romanian table tennis player

Personal information
- Nationality: Romanian
- Born: 13 August 1970 (age 54); Jimbolia, Romania

Sport
- Sport: Table tennis

Maria Bogoslov (born 13 August 1970) is a Romanian table tennis player. She competed in the women's doubles event at the 1992 Summer Olympics.
