= Christian Amoah =

Ghanaian weightlifter

Personal information
- Born: 25 July 1999 (age 26) Accra, Ghana
- Height: 1.84 m (6 ft 0 in)
- Weight: 82 kg (181 lb)

Sport
- Sport: Weightlifting
- Event: 85 kg

Christian Amoah (born 25 July 1999) is a Ghanaian weightlifter who currently competes in the 85 kg event. He competed in the Men's 77 kg at the 2014 Commonwealth Games.

Amoah represented Ghana in the Men's 85 kg at the 2016 Summer Olympics in Rio de Janeiro, Brazil. He was the inaugural male Ghanaian to compete in weightlifting at the modern Olympics. He was also the youngest athlete to take part in weightlifting at the 2016 Summer Olympics.

He represented Ghana at the 2020 Summer Olympics.

== Competition record ==
Year	Competition	Venue	Position	Event	Notes
Representing Ghana
2014	Commonwealth Games	Glasgow, Scotland	22nd	Men's 77 kg	Snatch: 110 kg C & J: 128 kg Total: 228 kg
2016	Summer Olympics	Rio de Janeiro, Brazil	21st	Men's 85 kg	Snatch: 130 kg C & J: 153 kg Total: 283 kg
