= Isaac Opoku (table tennis) =

Ghanaian table tennis player

Personal information
- Nationality: Ghanaian
- Born: 1 September 1975 (age 50)

Sport
- Sport: Table tennis

Isaac Opoku (born 1 September 1975) is a Ghanaian table tennis player. He competed in the men's singles event at the 1996 Summer Olympics.
