= Lee Jeong-im =

South Korean table tennis player

Personal information
- Nationality: South Korean
- Born: 1 July 1971 (age 53)

Sport
- Sport: Table tennis

Lee Jeong-im (born 1 July 1971) is a South Korean table tennis player. She competed in the women's singles event at the 1992 Summer Olympics.
