= Akwasi Frimpong =

Dutch-Ghanaian sprinter, bobsledder, and skeleton athlete

Akwasi Frimpong OLY
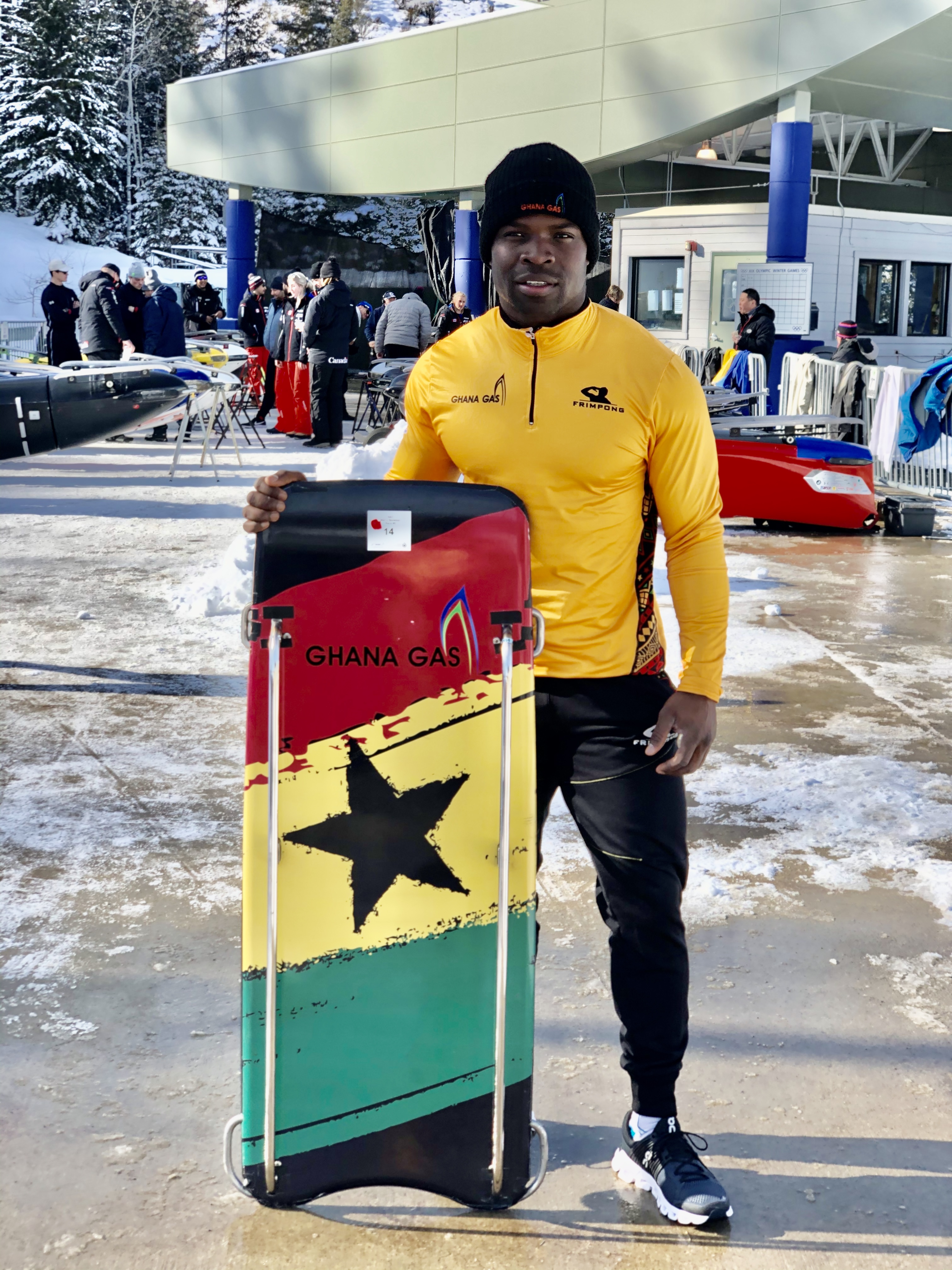

Personal information
- Born: 11 February 1986 (age 40)

Sport
- Country: Netherlands, Ghana
- Sport: Skeleton, sprinting, bobsledding

Akwasi Frimpong (born 11 February 1986) is a Dutch-Ghanaian sprinter, bobsledder, and skeleton athlete. Frimpong was raised in Ghana and later moved to the Netherlands. He is a former Dutch Junior Champion in the 200 meter sprints. To qualify for the Olympics, Frimpong decided to compete for his country Ghana in skeleton. Frimpong qualified for the 2018 Olympics in skeleton, earning the continental representation spot for the continent of Africa in skeleton. On February 29, 2020, Akwasi Frimpong became the first skeleton athlete from Africa to win an elite skeleton race sanctioned by the USA Bobsled and Skeleton Federation in Park City, Utah.

== Early life and education ==
Frimpong, who was born in Ghana grew up in Kumasi and moved to the Netherlands at age 8. His first eight years were spent in a small one-room home in the city of Kumasi, Ghana. His grandmother Minka raised him and nine other grandchildren. Though they all slept on the ground and his grandmother struggled to feed that many mouths, Frimpong remembers those years with fondness. At the age of eight, Frimpong joined his mother, Esther Amoako, a gospel singer, in the Netherlands. At that time, he was not a legal immigrant to the Netherlands, but his family worked on obtaining his Dutch residence permit. The process took 13 more years and was a monumental effort by his many supporters. He finally earned his residency permit in 2007 and gained Dutch nationality in 2008. When ready to attend high school, with his illegal status, the only school that gave him a high school education chance was Johan Cruyff College, a school that offers athletes an opportunity to balance sport with vocational education. During this period, he faced several challenges, which Frimpong describes as: As an illegal immigrant, I had to face different challenges. I was unhappy. I was scared, and I didn't know what to do. I felt abused, I felt an outcast. It was only after what Frimpong describes as ‘monumental effort’, that the athlete and his parents were able to acquire a legal residence permit in the Netherlands in 2007 and Dutch nationality in 2008.

== Running ==
Frimpong began sprinting at 15 years old when a friend showed him a medal he had won in a race. Frimpong wanted one, so in 2001, he started running under former Olympian Sammy Monsels. After just two years of hard work and intense training, Frimpong won the title of Dutch junior champion in the 200-meter sprint. This was the same achievement that earned him the nickname ‘GoldenSprint’. By 2003, he earned the nickname GoldenSprint, and he aspired to compete at the Olympic Games. To honor Frimpong's work, Monsels gave him his golden track shoes at this time.

== Injury and Athletic Scholarship to Utah Valley University ==
Immediately after his first national win, Frimpong suffered a severe ankle injury that derailed his pursuit of excellence. This was the time when he was still an undocumented immigrant; therefore, many doctors refused to provide him with medical treatment and physiotherapy. However, a physiotherapist named Michael Davidson, who had been following the story of this budding athlete, decided to treat him against a token fee of one euro only. Despite the compassionate and professional care provided by Michael, it took Akwasi three years before he could completely recover from the injury and started running again.

He met some students who had studied in America and heard about running opportunities there. In order to utilize the time when he was unable to participate in athletic competitions, Akwasi applied to several colleges in America. One of the universities he sent his athletic profile to was Utah Valley University. He was offered an athletic scholarship.

== Rise to prominence ==
Frimpong started at UVU in 2008 and ran for the college team in 100 meters, 200 m, and the 4×100-meter relay. In May 2010, Frimpong helped the relay team break the school record during the 2010 Great West Conference Championships with a time of 41.05 seconds. In 2011, he helped the UVU 4 × 400 m relay team win a gold medal and broke the meet record during the Great West Indoor Championships held at the Armory indoor track in New York City. Individually, his times recorded for the university were 6.99 seconds in the 60-meter dash, 10.71 in the 100 m and 21.93 over 200 m. He graduated from Utah Valley University (UVU) with honors in marketing and a minor in business management in 2013.

=== Bobsledding ===
After college, Frimpong recorded 6.85 seconds in the 60-meter dash, 10.45 seconds in the 100 meters, and 21.88 seconds in 200 meters race.

The Dutch team came up to Park City, Utah during November, the team tried out Frimpong as the brakeman for the four-man World Cup Race in Park City. Pushing off the Dutch "B" team, Frimpong, Ivo de Bruin, Thierry Kruithoff, and Bror van der Zijde were ranked 21st out of 26 teams. In September 2013, Frimpong was invited to the Dutch Pre-Olympic Team trials. After two days pushoff in Oberhof, Germany he was selected among seven other brakemen. His next performance came at the 2013 North American Cup Race in Park City, where he was in the two-man bob with de Bruin, but after finishing second, the team was disqualified as their sled was made of non-FIBT-permitted materials. Neither Frimpong nor De Bruin made the Dutch team for the 2014 Winter Olympics.

== Olympic Games and Skeleton ==
In 2018, Frimpong became the first skeleton athlete from Ghana, Ghana's second Winter Olympian, and the first black male skeleton athlete in Olympic history. Frimpong qualified for the 2018 Olympics in skeleton by obtaining a near-automatic invitation by virtue of continental representation, being the only male athlete representing the African continent. Frimpong finished in last place at the PyeongChang Games, of the thirty entrants, a year after finishing in last place at the 2017 IBSF World Championships of the 44 entrants. On February 29, 2020, Akwasi Frimpong became the first skeleton athlete from Africa to win an elite skeleton race sanctioned by the USA Bobsled and Skeleton Federation in Park City, Utah.

== Rabbit Theory ==
The documentary film, The Rabbit Theory, was produced by Dutch filmmakers Rinske Bosch and Nicole Batteke. It follows Frimpong for five years in the Netherlands, detailing his approach and philosophy for sprinting and attempts at making the Summer Olympics.

== Personal life ==
Frimpong is married to Erica Shields-Frimpong, who was also a student-athlete, and they have two daughters.

Olympic Games
Preceded by Flings Owusu-Agyapong	Flagbearer for Ghana; Pyeongchang 2018	Succeeded by Nadia Eke; Sulemanu Tetteh
