= Lotta Erlman =

Swedish table tennis player

Personal information
- Nationality: Swedish
- Born: 29 May 1968 (age 56); Borlänge, Sweden

Sport
- Sport: Table tennis

Lotta Erlman (born 29 May 1968) is a Swedish table tennis player. She competed in the women's singles event at the 1992 Summer Olympics.
