= Mamood Amadu =

Ghanaian footballer

Personal information
- Date of birth: 17 November 1972 (age 52)

Medal record

Men's association football

Representing Ghana

Olympic Games
Bronze medal – third place	1992 Barcelona	Team competition

Mamood Amadu (born 17 November 1972) is a football player from Ghana, who was a member of the Men's National Team that won the bronze medal at the 1992 Summer Olympics in Barcelona, Spain. He played as a striker.
