= Yukino Matsumoto =

Japanese table tennis player

Personal information
- Nationality: Japanese
- Born: 15 June 1970 (age 54)

Sport
- Sport: Table tennis

Yukino Matsumoto (松本 雪乃, Matsumoto Yukino, born 15 June 1970) is a Japanese table tennis player. She competed in the women's doubles event at the 1992 Summer Olympics.
