= Ghana at the 1964 Summer Olympics =

- IOC code: GHA
- NOC: Ghana Olympic Committee

in Tokyo
- Competitors: 42 in 3 sports
- Medals Ranked 35th: Gold 0 Silver 0 Bronze 1 Total 1

Summer Olympics appearances (overview)
- 1952; 1956; 1960; 1964; 1968; 1972; 1976–1980; 1984; 1988; 1992; 1996; 2000; 2004; 2008; 2012; 2016; 2020; 2024; 2028

Ghana competed at the 1964 Summer Olympics in Tokyo, Japan.

== Medalists ==
Medal	Name	Sport	Event
Bronze	Eddie Blay	Boxing	Men's Light Welterweight (63.5 kg)

== Results by event ==
=== Athletics ===
Men's 100 metres

- Stanley Fabian Allotey

- Round 1 — 10.7 s (→ 7th in heat, did not advance)

- Michael Ahey

- Round 1 — 10.6 s (→ 7th in heat, did not advance)

Men's 200 metres

- Michael Okantey

- Round 1 — 21.9 s (→ 6th in heat, did not advance)

Men's 400 metres

- Ebenezer Quartey

- Round 1 — 47.1 s (→ 2nd in heat, advanced to 2nd round)
- Round 2 — 47.0 s (→ 7th in heat, did not advance)

- Samuel Owusu-Mensah

- Round 1 — DNS

Men's 1500 metres

- Eric Amevor

- Round 1 — 3:58.4 min (→ 11th in heat, did not advance)

Men's 4×100 metres relay

- Michael Okantey, Michael Ahey, Ebenezer Charle O. Addy, Stanley Fabian Allotey

- Round 1 — 40.8 s (→ 5th in heat, advanced to semi-final)
- Semi-Final — 40.7 s (→ 8th in heat, did not advance)

Men's 4×400 metres relay

- James Addy, Brobbey Mensah, Samuel Zanya Bugri, Ebenezer Quartey

- Round 1 — 3:10.4 min (→ 5th in heat, did not advance)

Men's long jump

- Michael Ahey

- Qualification — 753 cm (→ advanced to the final)
- Final — 730 cm (→ 7th place)

Women's 100 metres

- Rose Hart

- Round 1 — 11.9 s (→ 5th in heat, advanced to 2nd round)
- Round 2 — 11.9 s (→ 6th in heat, did not advance)

- Christiana Boateng

- Round 1 — 12.9 s (→ 8th in heat, did not advance)

Women's 80 metre hurdles

- Rose Hart

- Round 1 — 11.3 s (→ 3rd in heat, advanced to semi-finals)
- Semi Final — 11.1 s (→ 8th in heat, did not advance)

Women's long jump

- Alice Anum

- Qualification — 545 cm (→ did not advance)

=== Boxing ===
Flyweight

- Sulley Shittu

- Round 1 — defeated Jumaat Ibrahim (MAL) KO-1 2:17
- Round 2 — lost to John Anthony McCafferty (IRL) 2:3

Bantamweight

- Cassis Aryee

- Round 1 — defeated Thein Myint (BIR) KO-2 2:03
- Round 2 — lost to Takao Sakurai (JPN) 0:5

Lightweight

- Sammy Lee Amekudji

- Round 1 — bye
- Round 2 — lost to Kanemaru Shiratori (JPN) KO-1 1:27

Light welterweight

- Eddie Blay

- Round 1 — bye
- Round 2 — defeated Preben R.S. Rasmussen (DEN) 5:0
- Round 3 — defeated Nol Touch (CAM) KO-2 1:34
- Quarterfinals — defeated Joao Henrique Da Silva (BRA) 5:0
- Semi-finals — lost to Jerzy Kulej (POL) 0:5

Light middleweight

- Eddie Davies

- Round 1 — defeated Laszlo Sebok (HUN) 5:0
- Round 2 — defeated Tolman Gibson Jr. (USA) 5:0
- Quarterfinals — lost to Boris Lagutin (SOV) RET

Middleweight

- Joe Darkey

- Round 1 — bye
- Round 2 — defeated James Columbus Rosette (USA) 3:2
- Quarterfinals — lost to Valery Popenchenko (SOV) 0:5

Light Heavyweight

- Thomas Arimi

- Round 1 — bye
- Round 2 — lost to Sayed Mersal (UAR) 0:5

=== Football ===
==== Group D ====
October 12, 1964
12:00

Argentina	1–1	Ghana
Bulla 26'	Report	E. Acquah 80'

Yokohama
Attendance: 25.000
Referee: Ashkenazi (ISR)
October 16, 1964
14:00

Japan	2–3	Ghana
Sugiyama 12'; Yaegachi 52'	Report	Agyemang 27'; S. Acquah 69'; Fulaiteh 80'

Tokyo
Referee: Nitescu (ROU)

	Pld	W	D	L	GF	GA	Pts
Ghana	2	1	1	0	4	3	3
Japan	2	1	0	1	5	5	2
Argentina	2	0	1	1	3	4	1
Italy	0	0	0	0	0	0	0

==== Quarterfinals ====
October 18, 1964
12:00

Egypt	5–1	Ghana
Badawi 42' 61'; Riad 65'; Elfanagili 69' 85'	Report	Mfum 37'

Tokyo
Referee: Glöckner (GDR)
