= 2012 ECOWAS Games =

II All-Africa Games
- Host city: Accra, Ghana
- Nations: 15
- Events: 5 sports
- Opening: 16 June 2012
- Closing: 22 June 2012
- Opened by: John Mahama
- Main venue: Accra Sports Stadium
- Website: www.ecowasgames.moys.goc.gh

The 2012 ECOWAS Games was the second biennial regional sports meeting of the Economic Community of West African States. The event was held in Accra, Ghana from the 16th of June to the 22nd of June 2012. Ghana's sports team won the most medals at the event. The 5 sports that featured in the 2012 games were athletics, wrestling, handball, volleyball and boxing. The first edition of the event was held in Nigeria in 2010. The games were sponsored by Rlg Communications, Ghana National Petroleum Corporation, Ghana Oil Company, Ghana National Petroleum Corporation, Ghallywood and Zoomlion.

== Participating nations ==
- Ghana
- Benin
- Burkina Faso
- Cape Verde
- Ivory Coast
- The Gambia
- Guinea
- Guinea-Bissau
- Liberia
- Mali
- Niger
- Nigeria
- Senegal
- Sierra Leone
- Togo

== Sports ==
- Athletics ()
- Boxing ()
- Handball ()
- Volleyball ()
- Wrestling ()

== Medal table ==
* Host nation (Ghana)

| Rank | Nation | Gold | Silver | Bronze | Total |
|---|---|---|---|---|---|
| 1 | Ghana (GHA)* | 17 | 11 | 9 | 37 |
| 2 | Nigeria (NGR) | 13 | 16 | 6 | 35 |
| 3 | Senegal (SEN) | 4 | 1 | 2 | 7 |
| 4 | Niger (NIG) | 2 | 2 | 3 | 7 |
| 5 | Ivory Coast (CIV) | 2 | 0 | 0 | 2 |
| 6 | Benin (BEN) | 1 | 0 | 2 | 3 |
| 7 | Togo (TOG) | 1 | 0 | 0 | 1 |
| 8 | Burkina Faso (BUR) | 0 | 3 | 3 | 6 |
| 9 | Liberia (LBR) | 0 | 1 | 0 | 1 |
| 10 | Mali (MLI) | 0 | 0 | 5 | 5 |
| 11 | Sierra Leone (SLE) | 0 | 0 | 2 | 2 |
| 12 | Cape Verde (CPV) | 0 | 0 | 0 | 0 |
| 12 | Gambia (GAM) | 0 | 0 | 0 | 0 |
| 12 | Guinea (GUI) | 0 | 0 | 0 | 0 |
| 12 | Guinea-Bissau (GBS) | 0 | 0 | 0 | 0 |
| Totals (15 entries) | | 40 | 34 | 32 | 106 |

== Calendar ==
The schedule of the games was as follows. The calendar is to be completed with event finals information.

| OC | Opening ceremony | ● | Event competitions | 1 | Event finals | CC | Closing ceremony |

| September | 2nd Sat | 3rd Sun | 4th Mon | 5th Tue | 6th Wed |
|---|---|---|---|---|---|
| Ceremonies | OC | | | | CC |
| Athletics | | ● | ● | ● | |
| Boxing | | 1 | | | |
| Handball | | | | 1 | |
| volleyball | | | 1 | | |
| Wrestling | | | 1 | | |

== Venues ==
- Accra Sports Stadium Complex – Boxing, Handball, Volleyball, Wrestling
- El-Wak Sports Stadium – Athletics
