= Albert Agyemang =

Ghanaian sprinter

- Born: 4 October 1977 (age 48)
- Known for: Retired Ghanaian sprinter

Albert Agyemang (born 4 October 1977) is a retired Ghanaian sprinter who specialized in the 200 metres.

He has competed in two Olympic Games, in 1996 and 2000.

His personal best time is 20.64 seconds, achieved in July 1999 in Tampere. The Ghanaian record currently belongs to Emmanuel Tuffour with 20.15 seconds.
