= Sammi Adjei =

Ghanaian footballer (born 1973)

Personal information
- Date of birth: 18 November 1973 (age 53)

Medal record

Men's association football

Representing Ghana

Olympic Games
Bronze medal – third place	1992 Barcelona	Team competition

Sammi Adjei (born 18 November 1973) is a football defender from Ghana. He was a member of the men's national team that won the bronze medal at the 1992 Summer Olympics in Barcelona, Spain.

== Career ==
Adjei played as a full-back, helping his club Obuasi Goldfields win the Ghana Premier League for three consecutive seasons in the 1990s.

== Personal life ==
Sammy Adjei currently resides in New Jersey, U.S.A. He is a successful youth coach there and has won several trophies with his teams. He is married with two children. His son, Sammy Adjei Jr is a footballer who has already represented the United States U-14 and u-18 levels and was recently called up to Ghana Black Satellites camp.
