= Ablade Kumah =

Ghanaian footballer

Personal information
- Full name: Samuel Ablade Kumah
- Date of birth: 26 June 1970 (age 56)
- Place of birth: Ghana
- Position: Midfielder

Senior career*
| Years | Team | Apps | (Gls) |
| 1987–1994 | Accra Hearts of Oak | | |
| 1995–1997 | Al-Shabab | | |
| 1997–1998 | Al-Ittihad | | |
Medal record
Men's association football
Representing Ghana
Olympic Games
| Bronze medal – third place | 1992 Barcelona | Team competition |
- * Club domestic league appearances and goals

Samuel Ablade Kumah (born 26 June 1970) is a Ghanaian professional footballer who played as a midfielder. He was a member of the Ghana national team which won the bronze medal at the 1992 Summer Olympics in Barcelona, Spain.

== Club career ==
Ablade Kumah played most of his club football in Ghana with Accra Hearts of Oak between 1987 and 1993. He played as a midfielder.

== International career ==
Ablade Kumah was a member of the Ghana football team at the 1992 Barcelona Olympics where they won the bronze medal.
