= Gold Coast at the 1952 Summer Olympics =

Ghana at the 1952 Summer Olympics
- Flag of the Gold Coast
- IOC code: GHA

in Helsinki
- Competitors: 7 (all men) in 1 sport
- Medals: Gold 0 Silver 0 Bronze 0 Total 0

Summer Olympics appearances (overview)
- 1952; 1956; 1960; 1964; 1968; 1972; 1976–1980; 1984; 1988; 1992; 1996; 2000; 2004; 2008; 2012; 2016; 2020; 2024

The Gold Coast along with British Togoland, now known as Ghana, competed at the 1952 Summer Olympics in Helsinki, Finland. Seven competitors, all men, took part in five events in one sport. It was the first appearance of the West African nation, which didn't win a medal at its debut.

== Results by event ==
=== Athletics ===
Men's 100 metres

- Gabriel Laryea

- Round 1 — 11.1 s (→ 3rd in heat, did not advance)

- George Acquaah

- Round 1 — 11.2 s (→ 5th in heat, did not advance)

Men's 800 metres

- Mohamed Sanni-Thomas

- Round 1 — 2:05.8 min (→ 6th in heat, did not advance)

Men's 4x100 metres relay

- Gabriel Laryea, George Acquaah, John Owusu, Augustus Lawson

- Round 1 — 42.1 s (→ 4th in heat, did not advance)

Men's high jump

- James Owoo

- Qualification — 187 cm (→ advanced to the final)
- Final — 180 cm (→ 20th place)

Men's triple jump

- William Laing

- Qualification — 14.09 m (→ did not advance)
