= Shamo Quaye =

Ghanaian footballer

Personal information
- Date of birth: 22 October 1971
- Place of birth: Tema, Ghana
- Date of death: 30 November 1997 (aged 26)
- Place of death: Tema, Ghana
- Position: Attacking midfielder

Youth career
- Soccer Angels

Senior career*
Years	Team	Apps	(Gls)
1989–1993	Hearts of Oak		
1993–1995	Al-Qadisiyah	50	(7)
1995–1996	Hearts of Oak		
1996–1997	Umeå		

International career^{‡}
1988–1997	Ghana	41	(0)
- * Club domestic league appearances and goals as of 7 August 2008 ‡ National team caps and goals as of 7 August 2008

Medal record

Men's association football

Representing Ghana

Olympic Games
Bronze medal – third place	1992 Barcelona	Team competition

Shamo Quaye (22 October 1971 – 30 November 1997) was a Ghanaian professional footballer who was a member of the men's national team that won bronze medal at the 1992 Summer Olympics in Barcelona, Spain.

== Career ==
He played for Hearts of Oak in his native country. At the time of death he was playing for Umeå FC in Sweden, but he was in his home country with the national team. During practice Quaye was hit in the face. He died two days later from sudden complications.
