= Ibrahim Dossey =

Ghanaian footballer

Personal information
- Full name: Ibrahim Allotey Dossey
- Date of birth: 24 November 1972
- Place of birth: Accra, Ghana
- Date of death: 9 December 2008 (aged 36)
- Place of death: Bucharest, Romania
- Height: 1.85 m (6 ft 1 in)
- Position: Goalkeeper

Senior career*
| Years | Team | Apps | (Gls) |
| 2000–2003 | FC Brașov | 48 | (0) |
| 2003 | Rapid București | 6 | (0) |
| 2003–2005 | FC Brașov | 42 | (0) |
| 2005–2006 | Unirea Sânnicolau Mare | 23 | (0) |
| 2006–2008 | Pandurii Târgu Jiu | 10 | (0) |
| 2008 | FCM Târgovişte | 0 | (0) |
| Total | | 129 | (0) |

International career
| 1992 | Ghana U-23 | 5 | (0) |
Medal record
Men's association football
Representing Ghana
Olympic Games
| Bronze medal – third place | 1992 Barcelona | Team competition |
- * Club domestic league appearances and goals

Ibrahim Allotey Dossey (24 November 1972 – 9 December 2008) was a Ghanaian professional football goalkeeper.

== Club career ==
Dossey was born in Accra, Ghana. He started his career with local club Accra Hearts of Oak. In 2000, he was brought to Romania by his former coach at Accra, Petre Gavrilă, where he played for several clubs, including FC Brașov, Rapid București, and Pandurii Târgu Jiu

== International career ==
Dossey was part of Ghana's U-23 team that won Africa's first Olympic football medal at the 1992 Summer Olympics in Barcelona, Spain.

== Personal life and death ==
Dossey was married to a Romanian woman named Ioana, with whom he had a daughter, Jennifer-Ștefania (born 2004), who is a triple jumper for Romania.

Dossey signed with FCM Târgovişte two days before he crashed his car on 13 September 2008 near Breaza, Prahova County, and fell into a coma. His wife and daughter were not injured in the accident. He remained in a coma for nearly three months before dying at Bagdasar Arseni Hospital in Bucharest on 9 December 2008, at the age of 36. He was buried in Hârşova, Romania, on 10 December.

=== Reactions ===
Bogdan Lobonţ: "I cannot believe it! I had hoped that Dossey's medical condition would improve. I am sad, Romanian football has lost a valuable goalkeeper. God rest his soul!"

Ioan Neculaie (the owner of FC Brașov): "I met Dossey only as a player for the club I own, but I can say about him that I never heard anyone saying bad things about him. His character was an example. It is unbelievable."
