= Christian Nsiah =

Ghanaian sprinter

Sport
- Sport: Athletics

Christian Nsiah (born 25 December 1975) is a retired Ghanaian sprinter who specialized in the 200 metres.

== Career ==
Nsiah ran for the Southern–New Orleans Knights track and field team for one year before transferring to the Middle Tennessee Blue Raiders track and field program.

He competed at the 1999 World Championships and the Olympic Games in 1996, 2000 and 2004, but he did not reach the final round on any occasion.

His personal best times are 6.58 seconds in the 60 metres, achieved in January 1999 in Colorado Springs; 10.19 seconds in the 100 metres, achieved in July 2000 in Lapinlahti; and 20.48 seconds in the 200 metres, achieved in April 2002 in Knoxville.

Together with Leo Myles-Mills, Aziz Zakari, and Eric Nkansah, he won the gold medal for Ghana in the 4X100 meter relay at the 2003 All-Africa Games in Abuja, Nigeria. He is the current holder of the Ohio Valley Conference indoor 55 meters record (6.24 secs). At one point, he was mistakenly credited with the world record in the 55 meters, after his hand time of 5.81 seconds was mistakenly recorded as electronic time.

== Personal life ==
Nsiah is the son of King Otumfuo Sebero of Ghana. He has five other siblings.

He attended Middle Tennessee State University in Murfreesboro, Tennessee, where he obtained his bachelor's degree in business administration (1999), master's degree in financial economics (2001), and Doctor of Philosophy in economics (2005). Other schools he attended include Southern University at New Orleans, University of Ghana (Legon), Opoku Ware School (Kumasi, Ghana), and Martyrs of Uganda Preparatory School (Ghana).

He later became a professor at Baldwin Wallace University.
