= Simon Addo =

Ghanaian footballer (born 1974)

Personal information
- Date of birth: 11 December 1974 (age 51)
- Position: Goalkeeper

Senior career*
Years	Team	Apps	(Gls)
1991–1995	Goldfields Obuasi		
1995–1997	Great Mariners		
1997–1999	Kalamata		

International career
1994–1998	Ghana	35	(0)
- * Club domestic league appearances and goals

Medal record

Men's association football

Representing Ghana

Olympic Games
Bronze medal – third place	1992 Barcelona	Team competition

Simon Addo (born 11 December 1974) is a Ghanaian retired footballer who played as a goalkeeper. He was a member of the Men's National Team that won the bronze medal at the 1992 Summer Olympics in Barcelona, Spain. He also competed at the 1996 Summer Olympics in Atlanta, United States.

Addo played for Kalamata in the Greek Alpha Ethniki.
