= Ghana Olympic Committee =

National Olympic Committee

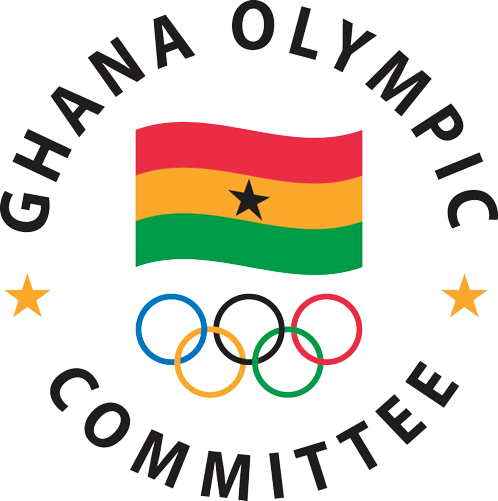
- Country: Ghana
- Code: GHA
- Created: 1950
- Recognized: 1951
- Continental Association: ANOCA
- Headquarters: Accra, Ghana
- President: Richard Kofi Akpokavie
- Secretary General: Mohammed Muniru Kassim
- Website: ghanaolympic.org

The Ghana Olympic Committee (GOC), formally known as Gold Coast Olympics Committee, is the country's National Olympic Committee established in 1950 and recognized the following year by International Olympic Committee. The Ghana Olympic Committee is committed to developing, organizing, and protecting Olympism or the Olympic Movement throughout the country. Ever since participating in the Summer Olympic Games in 1952 and the Commonwealth Games in 1954, during the Gold Coast period, the organization has been responsive to promoting the ideals of both Games, with respect to the ordinances set fourth by the Olympic Charter as well as the constitution of the CGF.

== History ==
The Ghana Olympic Committee (GOC) was established by the Olympic Charter in 1951 and is an incorporated non-profit making organisation registered in Ghana by the Registrar of Companies under the Companies Code 1963, Act 179, Company Registration Numbered G100.

The highest decision making authority of the GOC is the General Assembly, which convenes as a Congress every year, and elects a governing Board quadrennially, normally at the Congress that takes place after the Summer Olympic Games.

The day-to-day administration of the GOC is delegated by the Board to other President and the members of the Executive Committee. The GOC is recognised by the International Olympic Committee (IOC) as the National Olympic Committee of Ghana, and by the Commonwealth Games Federation (CGF) as the Commonwealth Games Association (CGA).

The mission of the Ghana Olympic Committee is to develop and protect the Olympic Movement in Ghana, and to promote the ideals of the Commonwealth Games in accordance with the Olympic Charter and the Constitution of the CGF. To fulfill this mandate, the GOC cooperates with both governmental or non-governmental bodies. The GOC propagates the aims and ideas of the Olympic Movement and seeks to use sports to improve the quality of the life of the people of Ghana.

== Executive committee ==
- President: Ben Nunoo Mensah
- Vice Presidents: Paul Atchoe, Yeboah Evans, Nii Adote Din Barima I
- Secretary General: Richard Akpokavie
- Deputy Secretary General: Richmond Quarcoo
- Treasurer: Frederick Lartey Otu
- Assistant Treasurer: Theophilus Wilson Edzie
- Members: Herbert Mensah, Emmanuel Nikoi, Leanier Afiyea-Obo Addy, Albert Frimpong, Isaac Duah, Joseph Kweku Ogah, Melvin Brown, George Owusu Ansaah, Mawuko Afadzinu, Jerry Ahmed Shaib

== Vision and Mission of GOC ==
The mission of the Ghana Olympic Commettee (GOC) is to develop and improve the Ghana Olympic movements. Also, they are to promote the ideas of the Commonwealth games in accordance with the Commonwealth charter.

== Logo ==
Former logo

== See also ==
- Ghana at the Olympics
- Ghana at the Commonwealth Games
