= Football at the 1964 Summer Olympics – Group D =

Football at the Summer Olympics group

Group D of the 1964 Summer Olympics football tournament took place from 12 to 16 October 1964. The group consisted of Argentina, Ghana and Japan. The top two teams, Ghana and Japan, advanced to the quarter-finals.

== Teams ==
Team	Region	Method of qualification	Date of qualification	Finals appearance	Last appearance	Previous best performance							
Team	Region	Method of qualification	Date of qualification	Finals appearance	Last appearance	Previous best performance	Japan	Asia	Hosts	26 May 1959	3rd	1956	Quarter-finals (1936)
Ghana	Africa	Africa Group 2 winners	18 April 1964	1st	—	—							
Argentina	South America	CONMEBOL Round Robin winners	24 May 1964	3rd	1960	Silver medal (1928)							
~~Italy~~ (Note: Italy withdrew prior to the final tournament.)	Europe	Europe Group 4 winners	9 July 1964	8th	1960	Gold medal (1936)							

== Standings ==
Pos	Team	Pld	W	D	L	GF	GA	GD	Pts	Qualification
1	Ghana	2	1	1	0	4	3	+1	3	Advanced to knockout stage
2	Japan	2	1	0	1	5	5	0	2	Advanced to knockout stage
3	Argentina	2	0	1	1	3	4	−1	1	
4	Italy	0	0	0	0	0	0	0	0	Withdrew

Source: RSSSF

In the quarter-finals:

- The winners of Group D, Ghana, advanced to play the runners-up of Group C, United Arab Republic.
- The runners-up of Group D, Japan, advanced to play the winners of Group C, Czechoslovakia.

== Matches ==
All times listed are local, JST (UTC+9).

=== Argentina vs Ghana ===
12 October 1964
15:00

Argentina	1–1	Ghana
Bulla 26'	Report	Acquah 80'

Mitsuzawa Soccer Stadium, Yokohama
Attendance: 12,452
Referee: Menachem Ashkenazi (Israel)

1	Agustín Cejas
2	Andrés Bertolotti
3	Otto Sesana
4	Horacio Moráles
5	Miguel Mori
6	Roberto Perfumo
8	José Malleo
9	Carlos Alberto Bulla
10	Néstor Manfredi
16	Antonio Cabrera
19	Miguel Tojo
Substitutions:
12	Miguel Marín
7	Ricardo Pérez
11	Héctor Ochoa
13	Juan Carlos Sconfianza
14	Emilio Pazos
15	Francisco Brandán
17	Juan Risso
18	Juan Carlos Domínguez
Manager:
(Argentina) Ernesto Duchini

1	Nii Dodoo Ankrah
2	Sam Acquah
3	Emmanuel Oblitey
4	Ben Acheampong
5	Charles Addo Odametey
7	Osei Kofi
8	Wilberforce Mfum
9	Edward Aggrey-Fynn
10	Edward Acquah
11	Kofi Pare
18	Mohammadu Salisu
Substitutions:
13	Addoquaye Laryea
6	Emmanuel Kwesi Nkansah
12	Abdul Ramonu Gibirine
14	Kwame Atta
15	Gladstone Ofori
16	Samuel Okai
17	Joseph Agyemang-Gyau
19	Kofi Anoi
20	Frank Odoi
21	Joseph Adjei
Manager:
(Ghana) Charles Gyamfi

Assistant referees:
István Zsolt (Hungary)
Gregg de Silva (Malaysia)

=== Japan vs Argentina ===
14 October 1964
15:00

Japan	3–2	Argentina
Sugiyama 54'; Kawabuchi 81'; Ogi 82'	Report	Domínguez 24', 62'

Komazawa Olympic Park Stadium, Tokyo
Attendance: 19,049
Referee: Aleksandar Škorić (Yugoslavia)

21	Kenzo Yokoyama
2	Hiroshi Katayama
5	Yoshitada Yamaguchi
6	Ryozo Suzuki
8	Mitsuo Kamata
10	Aritatsu Ogi
12	Saburō Kawabuchi
13	Shigeo Yaegashi
15	Kunishige Kamamoto
16	Teruki Miyamoto
18	Ryūichi Sugiyama
Substitutions:
1	Tsukasa Hosaka
3	Masakatsu Miyamoto
4	Ryuzo Hiraki
7	Hisao Kami
9	Kiyoshi Tomizawa
11	Takaji Mori
17	Shozo Tsugitani
Manager:
(Germany) Dettmar Cramer

1	Agustín Cejas
2	Andrés Bertolotti
3	Otto Sesana
4	Horacio Moráles
5	Miguel Mori
6	Roberto Perfumo
10	Néstor Manfredi
11	Héctor Ochoa
16	Antonio Cabrera
17	Juan Risso
18	Juan Carlos Domínguez
Substitutions:
12	Miguel Marín
7	Ricardo Pérez
8	José Malleo
9	Carlos Alberto Bulla
13	Juan Carlos Sconfianza
14	Emilio Pazos
15	Francisco Brandán
19	Miguel Tojo
Manager:
(Argentina) Ernesto Duchini

Assistant referees:
Menachem Ashkenazi (Israel)
Ashgar Teherani (Iran)

=== Ghana vs Japan ===
16 October 1964
15:00

Ghana	3–2	Japan
Agyemag-Gyau 27'; Acquah 69'; Aggrey-Fynn 80'	Report	Sugiyama 12'; Yaegashi 52'

Komazawa Olympic Park Stadium, Tokyo
Referee: Cornel Niţescu (Romania)

1	Nii Dodoo Ankrah
2	Sam Acquah
3	Emmanuel Oblitey
5	Charles Addo Odametey
6	Emmanuel Kwesi Nkansah
8	Wilberforce Mfum
9	Edward Aggrey-Fynn
10	Edward Acquah
11	Kofi Pare
16	Samuel Okai
17	Joseph Agyemang-Gyau
Substitutions:
13	Addoquaye Laryea
4	Ben Acheampong
7	Osei Kofi
12	Abdul Ramonu Gibirine
14	Kwame Atta
15	Gladstone Ofori
18	Mohammadu Salisu
19	Kofi Anoi
20	Frank Odoi
21	Joseph Adjei
Manager:
(Ghana) Charles Gyamfi

21	Kenzo Yokoyama
2	Hiroshi Katayama
5	Yoshitada Yamaguchi
6	Ryozo Suzuki
7	Hisao Kami
8	Mitsuo Kamata
10	Aritatsu Ogi
13	Shigeo Yaegashi
15	Kunishige Kamamoto
16	Teruki Miyamoto
18	Ryūichi Sugiyama
Substitutions:
1	Tsukasa Hosaka
3	Masakatsu Miyamoto
4	Ryuzo Hiraki
9	Kiyoshi Tomizawa
11	Takaji Mori
12	Saburō Kawabuchi
17	Shozo Tsugitani
Manager:
(Germany) Dettmar Cramer

Assistant referees:
Aleksandar Škorić (Croatia)
Gregg de Silva (Malaysia)

== See also ==
- Japan at the Olympics
- Ghana at the Olympics
- Argentina at the Olympics
- Italy at the Olympics
