= 1965 African Cup of Nations squads =

Below is a list of squads used in the 1965 African Cup of Nations.

== Group A ==
=== Ethiopia ===
Coach: Tessema Wolde

No.	Pos.	Player	Date of birth (age)	Caps	Goals	Club
	GK	Getachew Abebe				(Ethiopian Football Federation) Saint George
	DF	Bekuretsion Gebrehiwot				(Eritrean National Football Federation) GS Hamasien
	DF	Wolde Emmanuel Fisseha	1943			(Ethiopian Football Federation) Saint George
	DF	Negasi Gebreselassie				(Ethiopian Football Federation) Ethio-Cement
	DF	Awad Mohammed				(Ethiopian Football Federation) Saint George
	DF	Yehdego Wolde				(Ethiopian Football Federation) Cotton FC
	MF	Mengistu Worku	1940			(Ethiopian Football Federation) Saint George
	MF	Luciano Vassallo (captain)	15 August 1935 (aged 30)			(Ethiopian Football Federation) Cotton FC
	MF	Kiflom Araya				(Eritrean National Football Federation) Tele SC
	MF	Ismael Gerile	1942			(Ethiopian Football Federation) Ethio Cement
	FW	Italo Vassallo	1940			(Ethiopian Football Federation) Cotton FC
	FW	Shewangizaw Agonafir				(Ethiopian Football Federation) Saint George
	FW	Nure Mohammed				(Ethiopian Football Federation)

=== Senegal ===
Coach: Habib Bâ and Lybasse Diop

No.	Pos.	Player	Date of birth (age)	Caps	Goals	Club
	GK	Massata Diallo	1938 (aged 27)			(Senegalese Football Federation) US Gorée
	GK	Toumani Diallo				(Senegalese Football Federation) Foyer France Sénégal
	DF	Yérim Diagne	1943 (aged 22)			(Senegalese Football Federation) Réveil de Saint-Louis
	DF	Abdoulaye Diallo				(Senegalese Football Federation) ASC Jeanne d'Arc
	DF	Moustapha Dieng (captain)	9 April 1942 (aged 23)			(Senegalese Football Federation) ASC Jeanne d'Arc
	DF	Issa M'Baye				(Senegalese Football Federation) Foyer France Sénégal
	MF	Ousmane Camara				(Senegalese Football Federation) Foyer de Casamance
	MF	Louis Gomis	25 May 1945 (aged 20)			(Senegalese Football Federation) Foyer France Sénégal
	MF	Louis Camara				(Senegalese Football Federation) Espoir de Saint-Louis
	MF	Oumar Samb Guèye	27 February 1941 (aged 24)			(Senegalese Football Federation) Foyer France Sénégal
	FW	Matar Niang	20 January 1944 (aged 21)			(Senegalese Football Federation) Espoir de Saint-Louis
	FW	Baye Moussé Paye				(Senegalese Football Federation) US Gorée
	FW	Abdoulaye Diop	14 March 1945 (aged 20)			(Senegalese Football Federation) Foyer France Sénégal
	FW	Demba Thioye				(Senegalese Football Federation) US Gorée
	FW	Mohamed Fadel Fall				(Senegalese Football Federation) Olympique Thiès

=== Tunisia ===
Coach: Mokhtar Ben Nacef

No.	Pos.	Player	Date of birth (age)	Caps	Goals	Club
	GK	Ferjani Derouiche	7 February 1945 (aged 20)			(Tunisian Football Federation) AS Marsa
	GK	Sadok "Attouga" Sassi	15 November 1945 (aged 19)			(Tunisian Football Federation) Club Africain
	DF	Mohsen Habacha	25 January 1942 (aged 23)			(Tunisian Football Federation) ES Sahel
	DF	Mahfoudh Benzarti	22 January 1942 (aged 23)			(Tunisian Football Federation) US Monastirienne
	DF	Hédi Douiri				(Tunisian Football Federation) AS Marsa
	MF	Ahmed Lamine	3 October 1938 (aged 27)			(Tunisian Football Federation) ES Sahel
	MF	Abdelmajid Chetali (captain)	4 July 1939 (aged 26)			(Tunisian Football Federation) ES Sahel
	MF	Chedly Laaouini	16 November 1939 (aged 25)			(Tunisian Football Federation) ES Tunis
	MF	Tahar Chaïbi	17 February 1946 (aged 19)			(Tunisian Football Federation) Club Africain
	FW	Driss Haddad				(Tunisian Football Federation) CA Bizertin
	FW	Mohamed Salah Jedidi	17 March 1938 (aged 27)			(Tunisian Football Federation) Club Africain
	FW	Mongi Dalhoum	13 January 1945 (aged 20)			(Tunisian Football Federation) CS Sfaxien
	FW	Abdelwahab Lahmar	27 March 1944 (aged 21)			(Tunisian Football Federation) Stade Tunisien
	FW	Aleya Sassi	5 January 1942 (aged 23)			(Tunisian Football Federation) CS Sfaxien
	FW	Rachid Gribaâ	1946			(Tunisian Football Federation) ES Sahel
	MF	Moncef Ajel				(Tunisian Football Federation) Stade Tunisien
	MF	Hédi Sahli				(Tunisian Football Federation) ES Sahel
	MF	Mouldi Mezghouni				(Tunisian Football Federation) AS Marsa
	MF	Ali Graja				(Tunisian Football Federation) CS Sfaxien
	MF	Hmida Sallem				(Tunisian Football Federation) CS Sfaxien

== Group B ==
=== Congo-Léopoldville ===
Coach: Léon Mokuna

No.	Pos.	Player	Date of birth (age)	Caps	Goals	Club
	GK	Makiadi Castello				(Congolese Association Football Federation) CS Imana
	GK	Paul Ngoie	13 April 1943 (aged 22)			(Congolese Association Football Federation) CS Don Bosco
	DF	Pierre Katumba				(Congolese Association Football Federation) TP Englebert
	DF	Antoine Lessa	1933			(Congolese Association Football Federation) AS Dragons
	DF	Mabela "Patron" Routier (captain)				(Congolese Association Football Federation) Léo Sports
	MF	Kibonge Mafu	12 February 1945 (aged 20)			(Congolese Association Football Federation) AS Vita Club
	MF	Kafula Ngoie	11 November 1945 (aged 20)			(Congolese Association Football Federation) TP Englebert
	MF	Ernest "Saïo" Mokili				(Congolese Association Football Federation) AS Dragons
	MF	Paul Mbuli				(Congolese Association Football Federation) Himalaya Club
	MF	Augustin Diantela				(Congolese Association Football Federation) AS Vita Club
	MF	Pierre Kalala Mukendi	22 November 1939 (aged 25)			(Congolese Association Football Federation) TP Englebert
	MF	Mbula				(Congolese Association Football Federation)
	FW	Kabala				(Congolese Association Football Federation)
	FW	Albert Mwila				(Congolese Association Football Federation) AS Dragons
	FW	Kabeya Tshotsho				(Congolese Association Football Federation) TP Englebert

=== Ghana ===
Coach: Charles Gyamfi

No.	Pos.	Player	Date of birth (age)	Caps	Goals	Club
	GK	Nii Dodoo Ankrah	8 March 1934 (aged 31)			(Ghana Football Association) Real Republicans
	GK	Jon Bortey Noawy	13 June 1939 (aged 26)			(Ghana Football Association) Great Olympics
	DF	Charles Addo Odametey (captain)	23 February 1937 (aged 28)			(Ghana Football Association) Real Republicans
	DF	Agyemang Gyau	3 June 1939 (aged 26)			(Ghana Football Association) Real Republicans
	DF	Sam Acquah	10 July 1943 (aged 22)			(Ghana Football Association) Great Olympics
	DF	Willie Evans	21 November 1939 (aged 25)			(Ghana Football Association) Hearts of Oak
	DF	Bernard Kusi	1 June 1939 (aged 26)			(Ghana Football Association) Asante Kotoko
	MF	Paa Nii Lutterodt	1937			(Ghana Football Association) Great Olympics
	MF	Kofi Pare	28 November 1938 (aged 26)			(Ghana Football Association) Real Republicans
	MF	Frank Odoi	23 February 1943 (aged 22)			(Ghana Football Association) Great Olympics
	MF	Ben Acheampong	2 February 1939 (aged 26)			(Ghana Football Association) Real Republicans
	MF	Kwame Nti				(Ghana Football Association) Asante Kotoko
	MF	Oman Mensah				(Ghana Football Association) Great Olympics
	FW	Cecil Jones Attuquayefio	18 October 1944 (aged 21)			(Ghana Football Association) Real Republicans
	FW	Abdul Ganiyu Salami	5 October 1942 (aged 23)			(Ghana Football Association) Hearts of Oak
	FW	Osei Kofi	3 June 1940 (aged 25)			(Ghana Football Association) Asante Kotoko
	FW	Amosa Gbadamosi	15 April 1942 (aged 23)			(Ghana Football Association) Hearts of Oak
		Richard Barnei				(Ghana Football Association) Brong Ahafo United
		Joseph Addison				(Ghana Football Association) Cornerstone

=== Ivory Coast ===
Coach:

No.	Pos.	Player	Date of birth (age)	Caps	Goals	Club
	GK	Jean Keita				(Ivorian Football Federation) ASEC Mimosas
	GK	Théo Dossou				(Ivorian Football Federation) ASEC Mimosas
	DF	Joseph Niankoury				(Ivorian Football Federation) Africa Sports
	DF	Séry Wawa	1943			(Ivorian Football Federation) Africa Sports
	DF	Henri Konan	1937			(Ivorian Football Federation) Stade d'Abidjan
	MF	Mathias Diagou				(Ivorian Football Federation) Stade d'Abidjan
	MF	François Zadi				(Ivorian Football Federation) Stade d'Abidjan
	MF	Christophe Bazo				(Ivorian Football Federation) ASEC Mimosas
	MF	Bernard Gnahoré	1942			(Ivorian Football Federation) Africa Sports
	MF	Yoboué Konan	11 August 1942 (aged 23)			(French Football Federation) ÉDS Montluçon
	MF	Joseph Bléziri				(Ivorian Football Federation) Stade d'Abidjan
	FW	Ernest Kallet Bially				(Ivorian Football Federation) Africa Sports
	FW	Eustache Manglé				(Ivorian Football Federation) ASEC Mimosas
	FW	Mamadou Sylla				(Ivorian Football Federation)
	FW	François Tahi	28 May 1950 (aged 15)			(Ivorian Football Federation) Stade d'Abidjan
