= 1963 African Cup of Nations squads =

Below is a list of squads used in the 1963 African Cup of Nations.

== Group A ==
=== Ethiopia ===
Coach: Yidnekatchew Tessema

| No. | Pos. | Player | Date of birth (age) | Caps | Goals | Club |
|---|---|---|---|---|---|---|
| | GK | Gila-Michael Tekle Mariam | 1936 | | | (Ethiopian Football Federation) Adulis Club |
| | DF | Berhe Asmelash | | | | (Ethiopian Football Federation) Ethio-Cement FC |
| | DF | Awad Mohammed | | | | (Ethiopian Football Federation) Omedla FC |
| | DF | Berhe Goitom | | | | (Ethiopian Football Federation) Tele SC |
| | DF | Kiflom Araya | | | | (Ethiopian Football Federation) Tele SC |
| | DF | Nasir Bershe | | | | (Ethiopian Football Federation) |
| | MF | Gebremedhin Tesfaye | | | | (Ethiopian Football Federation) Tele SC |
| | MF | Luciano Vassallo (captain) | 15 August 1935 (aged 28) | | | (Ethiopian Football Federation) Cotton Factory Club |
| | MF | Mengistu Worku | 1940 | | | (Ethiopian Football Federation) Saint George |
| | MF | Girma Zeleke | | | | (Ethiopian Football Federation) Cotton Factory Club |
| | FW | Italo Vassallo | 1940 | | | (Ethiopian Football Federation) Cotton Factory Club |
| | FW | Getachew Wolde | | | | (Ethiopian Football Federation) Cotton Factory Club |
| | FW | Netsere Wolde Selassie | | | | (Ethiopian Football Federation) Saint George |

=== Ghana ===
Coach: Charles Gyamfi

| No. | Pos. | Player | Date of birth (age) | Caps | Goals | Club |
|---|---|---|---|---|---|---|
| | GK | Dodoo Ankrah | 8 March 1934 (aged 29) | | | (Ghana Football Association) Real Republicans |
| | GK | Ernest Joe de-Graft | | | | (Ghana Football Association) Cornerstones Kumasi |
| | DF | Charles Addo Odametey | 23 February 1937 (aged 26) | | | (Ghana Football Association) Real Republicans |
| | DF | Joe Aikins | | | | (Ghana Football Association) Cornerstones Kumasi |
| | DF | Atta Kwame | 22 November 1935 (aged 28) | | | (Ghana Football Association) Brong-Ahafo United |
| | DF | Agyemang Gyau | 3 June 1939 (aged 24) | | | (Ghana Football Association) Real Republicans |
| | DF | Franklin Crentsil | | | | (Ghana Football Association) Real Republicans |
| | DF | Emmanuel Oblitey | 5 February 1934 (aged 29) | | | (Ghana Football Association) Real Republicans |
| | MF | Ben Acheampong | 2 February 1939 (aged 24) | | | (Ghana Football Association) Real Republicans |
| | MF | Kofi Pare | 28 November 1938 (aged 24) | | | (Ghana Football Association) Real Republicans |
| | MF | Ofei Dodoo | | | | (Ghana Football Association) Real Republicans |
| | MF | Kwame Adarkwa | | | | (Ghana Football Association) Asante Kotoko |
| | MF | Edward Aggrey-Fynn (captain) | 24 November 1934 (aged 28) | | | (Ghana Football Association) Real Republicans |
| | FW | Edward Acquah | 23 July 1935 (aged 28) | | | (Ghana Football Association) Real Republicans |
| | FW | Osei Kofi | 3 June 1942 (aged 21) | | | (Ghana Football Association) Asante Kotoko |
| | FW | Wilberforce Mfum | 28 August 1936 (aged 27) | | | (Ghana Football Association) Asante Kotoko |
| | FW | Leonard Acquah | | | | (Ghana Football Association) Ghana Army |
| | FW | Mohamadu Salisu | 10 September 1934 (aged 29) | | | (Ghana Football Association) Asante Kotoko |

=== Tunisia ===
Coach: André Gérard

| No. | Pos. | Player | Date of birth (age) | Caps | Goals | Club |
|---|---|---|---|---|---|---|
| | GK | Mahmoud Kanoun | 21 March 1938 (aged 25) | | | (Tunisian Football Federation) ES Sahel |
| | GK | Sadok Sassi | 15 November 1945 (aged 18) | | | (Tunisian Football Federation) Club Africain |
| | DF | Mahfoudh Benzarti | 22 January 1942 (aged 21) | | | (Tunisian Football Federation) US Monastir |
| | DF | Mohieddine Zeghir | 4 February 1936 (aged 27) | | | (Tunisian Football Federation) Stade Tunisien |
| | DF | Mohsen Habacha | 25 January 1942 (aged 21) | | | (Tunisian Football Federation) ES Sahel |
| | DF | Hamadi Khouini | 21 May 1943 (aged 20) | | | (Tunisian Football Federation) Club Africain |
| | DF | Mohsen Keffala | | | | (Tunisian Football Federation) Stade Tunisien |
| | DF | Ahmed Sghaïer | 2 January 1937 (aged 26) | | | (Tunisian Football Federation) US Tunisienne |
| | MF | Mohamed Mahfoudh | | | | (Tunisian Football Federation) ES Sahel |
| | MF | Jameleddine Naoui | | | | (Tunisian Football Federation) Stade Tunisien |
| | MF | Raouf Ben Amor | 10 September 1944 (aged 19) | | | (Tunisian Football Federation) ES Sahel |
| | MF | Hédi Douiri | | | | (Tunisian Football Federation) AS Marsa |
| | MF | Abdelmajid Chetali | 4 July 1939 (aged 24) | | | (Tunisian Football Federation) ES Sahel |
| | MF | Taoufik Ben Othman | 24 March 1939 (aged 24) | | | (Tunisian Football Federation) AS Marsa |
| | FW | Alaya Sassi | 5 January 1942 (aged 21) | | | (Tunisian Football Federation) Club Sfaxien |
| | FW | Mohamed Salah Jedidi | 17 March 1938 (aged 25) | | | (Tunisian Football Federation) Club Africain |
| | FW | Ammar Merrichkou | 20 June 1942 (aged 21) | | | (Tunisian Football Federation) AS Marsa |
| | FW | Moncef El Gaïed | 16 November 1940 (aged 23) | | | (Tunisian Football Federation) Club Sfaxien |
| | FW | Hammadi Henia | 27 October 1933 (aged 30) | | | (Tunisian Football Federation) US Tunisienne |
| | FW | Mokhtar Chelbi | 15 March 1940 (aged 23) | | | (Tunisian Football Federation) AS Marsa |

== Group B ==
=== United Arab Republic ===
Coach: Fouad Sedki

| No. | Pos. | Player | Date of birth (age) | Caps | Goals | Club |
|---|---|---|---|---|---|---|
| | GK | Fathi Khorshid | 11 December 1937 (aged 25) | | | (Egyptian Football Association) Ghazl El-Mehalla |
| | GK | Ahmed Mohamed Reda | 9 November 1939 (aged 24) | | | (Egyptian Football Association) Al Ittihad Alexandria |
| | DF | Fathi Bayoumi | | | | (Egyptian Football Association) Tersana |
| | DF | Mimi Darwish | 20 March 1942 (aged 21) | | | (Egyptian Football Association) Ismaily SC |
| | DF | Amin El-Esnawi | 23 June 1936 (aged 27) | | | (Egyptian Football Association) Ittihad Suez |
| | DF | Mimi El-Sherbini | 26 July 1937 (aged 26) | | | (Egyptian Football Association) Al Ahly |
| | DF | El-Sayed El-Tabbakh | 3 November 1940 (aged 23) | | | (Egyptian Football Association) Al Qanah |
| | DF | Mohammed Khalaf | | | | (Egyptian Football Association) El Bahareya SC |
| | MF | Mohamed "Reda" Morsi Hussein | 8 April 1939 (aged 24) | | | (Egyptian Football Association) Ismaily SC |
| | MF | Rifaat El-Fanagily | 1 May 1936 (aged 27) | | | (Egyptian Football Association) Al Ahly |
| | FW | Hassan El-Shazly | 20 May 1943 (aged 20) | | | (Egyptian Football Association) Tersana |
| | FW | Mahmoud Hassan | 9 November 1943 (aged 20) | | | (Egyptian Football Association) Tersana |
| | FW | Moustafa Reyadh | 5 April 1941 (aged 22) | | | (Egyptian Football Association) Tersana |
| | FW | Taha Ismail | 8 February 1939 (aged 24) | | | (Egyptian Football Association) Al Ahly |
| | MF | Abdel-Latif Lotfi | | | | (Egyptian Football Association) Al Ittihad Alexandria |
| | MF | Hassan Salem | | | | (Egyptian Football Association) Tanta |
| | MF | Ezz El-Din Yaqoub | 1942 | | | (Egyptian Football Association) Olympic Club |
| | MF | Abdo El-Kararti | | | | (Egyptian Football Association) Damietta SC |

=== Nigeria ===
Coach: (Brazil) Jorge Augusto Pena

| No. | Pos. | Player | Date of birth (age) | Caps | Goals | Club |
|---|---|---|---|---|---|---|
| | GK | Emmanuel Omiunu | | | | (Nigeria Football Federation) Lagos Police |
| | GK | Lateef Gomez | | | | (Nigeria Football Federation) Lagos Railways FC |
| | DF | Adeniyi Omowon | | | | (Nigeria Football Federation) WNDC Ibadan |
| | DF | Isaac Nnado | | | | (Nigeria Football Federation) Aba Giant Killers |
| | DF | Adetunji Shotayo | | | | (Nigeria Football Federation) Lagos UAC |
| | MF | Abiodun Lajide | | | | (Nigeria Football Federation) Lagos Railways FC |
| | DF | Godwin Achebe (captain) | | | | (Nigeria Football Federation) Lagos ECN |
| | DF | Babajide Johnson | | | | (Nigeria Football Federation) WNDC Ibadan |
| | DF | Emmanuel Remi | | | | (Nigeria Football Federation) Lagos Police |
| | DF | Augustine Oduah | | | | (Nigeria Football Federation) Lagos ECN |
| | MF | Burniston Olayombo | | | | (Nigeria Football Federation) Lagos ECN |
| | MF | Kaiser Blankson | | | | (Nigeria Football Federation) Stationery Stores |
| | FW | Asuquo Ekpe | | | | (Nigeria Football Federation) Ibadan Lions |
| | MF | Paul Hamilton | 31 July 1941 (aged 22) | | | (Nigeria Football Federation) Lagos ECN |
| | FW | Joseph Bassey | | | | (Nigeria Football Federation) Lagos ECN |
| | FW | Albert Onyeawuna | 1935 | | | (Nigeria Football Federation) Port Harcourt FC |
| | MF | Shedrack Ajaero | | | | (Nigeria Football Federation) Lagos ECN |
| | MF | Chukwumah Igweonu | | | | (Nigeria Football Federation) Port Harcourt FC |

=== Sudan ===
Coach: (Bulgaria) Lozan Kotsev

| No. | Pos. | Player | Date of birth (age) | Caps | Goals | Club |
|---|---|---|---|---|---|---|
| | GK | Sabit Dudu (captain) | 1930 (aged 33) | | | (Sudan Football Association) Al-Hilal Club |
| | DF | Samir Saleh | 1942 (aged 21) | | | (Sudan Football Association) Al-Hilal Club |
| | MF | Ebrahim Kabir | | | | (Sudan Football Association) Al Ahli SC (Khartoum) |
| | DF | Amin Zaki | 1941 (aged 22) | | | (Sudan Football Association) Al-Hilal Club |
| | DF | Jaafar Gagarin | 1940 (aged 23) | | | (Sudan Football Association) Al-Merrikh SC |
| | MF | Omer Moscow | | | | (Sudan Football Association) Al-Mourada SC |
| | FW | Bakri Osman | 1932 (aged 31) | | | (Sudan Football Association) Al-Mourada SC |
| | FW | Abdelwahab Jagdoul | 1938 (aged 25) | | | (Sudan Football Association) Al-Merrikh SC |
| | FW | Majed Osman | | | | (Sudan Football Association) Al-Merrikh SC |
| | MF | Ebrahim Muhamed | | | | (Sudan Football Association) Al-Merrikh SC |
| | MF | Nasreldin Jaksa | 13 August 1944 (aged 19) | | | (Sudan Football Association) Al-Hilal Club |
| | FW | Abdelaziz Weza | | | | (Sudan Football Association) Al-Merrikh SC |
| | MF | Ebrahim Yahia Alkawarti | 1936 (aged 27) | | | (Sudan Football Association) Al-Hilal Club |
| | DF | Abdallah Abbas | | | | (Sudan Football Association) Al-Merrikh SC |
| | DF | Ali Sayed Ahmed | | | | (Sudan Football Association) Al-Mourada SC |
| | FW | Abdallah Ohaj | 1939 (aged 24) | | | (Sudan Football Association) Al-Hilal Club |
| | FW | Omer Altoum | | | | (Sudan Football Association) Al-Mourada SC |
| | FW | Mahjoub Allah Jabu | 1940 (aged 23) | | | (Sudan Football Association) Al Ahli SC (Khartoum) |
| | FW | Karar Hassan Karar | | | | (Sudan Football Association) Al-Ittihad SC (Wad Madani) |
