= John Attu Mensah =

Ghanaian footballer (died 2021)

Attu Mensah
Personal information
- Full name: John Attu Mensah
- Place of birth: Ghana
- Position: Winger

Senior career*
Years	Team	Apps	(Gls)
- Ebusua Dwarfs
- Hearts of Oak
- Newmarket Town
- Soham Town Rangers
- Cambridge United
- Norwich City
- Great Olympics

International career
1950s–1960s	Ghana		
- * Club domestic league appearances and goals

John Attu Mensah was a Ghanaian professional footballer who played as a winger for the Ghana national team. He is the father of Ghanaian international John Mensah.

== Club career ==
Mensah played for Cape Coast Ebusua Dwarfs in the 1960s, he later played for Accra Great Olympics in the late 1960s. On 28 July 1969, during an club international match against Great Olympics and Palmeiras during the training tour in Ghana, Attu played the full match and made the assist to Saul Mettle's goal, the equalizer which gave Olympics a draw at the Accra Sports Stadium.

Mensah (a left-half of Hearts of Oak and the holder of 23 international caps) moved to England in 1964, to study accountancy. On 19th August 1964, he played for a Charlton Athletic XI away to Newmarket Town in a pre-season friendly. He scored Charlton's first goal, as they recovered from 1-0 down, to win 4-1. He impressed Newmarket to such an extent, that three days later he was making his debut for them in a 2-2 draw with visiting Stowmarket in the Eastern Counties League Cup. His first goals for Newmarket came in the next match (also in the League Cup), a 2-1 home victory over Soham Town Rangers.

Mensah later made the switch to Soham Town Rangers. He was recorded as their goalscoring centre-forward in a 3-1 loss at Wisbech Town in the East Anglian Cup on 7th September 1966.

He was reportedly the first black person to play for Cambridge United. He later featured for Norwich City, before returning to Ghana in 1969 and retiring in the late 1970s.

== International career ==
At the international level, he played for the Ghana senior team in the 1950s to 1960s winning over 20 International caps for Ghana. He played alongside players like Aggrey Fynn, Dogo Moro, Baba Yara, C.K. Gyamfi (captain) and Edward Acquah.

== Personal life ==
John Attu Mensah is the father of former Ghanaian international defender and captain John Mensah. Mensah died in June 2021 in the United Kingdom after a short illness.
