= 1962 Ugandan Independence Tournament =

Association football event celebrating Uganda's independence

The Ugandan Independence Tournament was an association football event taking place in 1962 to celebrate Ugandan Independence held at the Nakivubo Stadium in Kampala. Three visiting teams played each other for the right to face Uganda in the final. Kenya was invited to replace Egypt which was unable to participate due to its domestic schedule; as a result, the eventual teams were Ghana, Kenya and an 'all-star' representative team from the English Isthmian League. The competition took the format of a formal group stage and final and also featured exhibition matches between both teams within the formal competition and other international teams, taking place from 29 September to 18 October 1962.

== Tournament ==
The three challenging teams took part in a group stage from 29 September to 7 October in a round-robin format, in which they each played 2 games. The winner of this competition then proceeded through to the final against Uganda on 10 October.

=== Group stage ===
In the group stage, two points were awarded for a win, with one point awarded for a draw. Ghana won their first game against Kenya 6–3, before drawing with Isthmian League to secure first place and move on to the final of the competition.

Team	Pts	Pld	W	D	L	GF	GA	GD
Ghana	3	2	1	1	0	8	5	+3
(England) Isthmian League	2	2	0	2	0	5	5	0
Kenya	1	2	0	1	1	6	9	-3

29 September 1962
Group stage

Ghana	6–3	Kenya
Wilberforce Mfum; Edward Acquah; Mohammadu Salisu; Baba Yara; Edward Aggrey-Fynn	Report	Joe Kadenge; Norman Curtis

Nakivubo Stadium, Kampala, Uganda
Attendance: N/A
Referee: D. K. Nkata

4 October 1962
Group stage

Kenya	3–3	(England) Isthmian League
Ali Sungura; Norman Curtis	Report	Len Worley 5'; Eric Nottage 10' 12'

Nakivubo Stadium, Kampala, Uganda
Attendance: N/A
Referee: Not Recorded

7 October 1962
Group stage

Ghana	2–2	(England) Isthmian League
Edward Acquah 20'; Edward Aggrey-Fynn 90'	Report	Jim Lewis 15'; Eddie Reynolds 40'

Nakivubo Stadium, Kampala, Uganda
Attendance: N/A
Referee: Not Recorded

=== Final ===
Ghana won the group stage and moved onto the final on 10 October 1962, where they subsequently beat Uganda, winning 4–1 at the Nakivubo Stadium.

10 October 1962
Final

Uganda	1–4	Ghana
Jimmy Kirunda 88'	Report	Wilberforce Mfum 30' 33'; Mohammadu Salisu 60'; Edward Acquah 70'

Nakivubo Stadium, Kampala, Uganda
Attendance: N/A

== Winners Tour ==
The winners of the competition, Ghana, were to go on a short tour following the competition featuring friendlies in away games against Kenya, and the then national football teams of the prior states of Tanganyika and Nyasaland. They won all three games, playing each at the respective teams national stadiums.

12 October 1962
Winners Tour

Kenya	0–4	Ghana
	Report	Edward Acquah 18' 48' 79'; Mohammadu Salisu 60'

Nairobi City Stadium, Nairobi, Kenya
Attendance: N/A

15 October 1962
Winners Tour

Nyasaland	0–12	Ghana
	Report	Wilberforce Mfum; Edward Acquah; Edward Aggrey-Fynn; Gyau

Nyasaland National Stadium, Blantyre, Malawi
Attendance: N/A

18 October 1962
Winners Tour

Tanganyika	2–6	Ghana
Unknown	Report	Unknown

Tanganyika National Stadium, Dar es Salaam, Tanzania
Attendance: N/A

== Friendlies ==
A friendly was played between Uganda and Isthmian League on 8 October, which ended in a 1–1 draw. This was the Isthmian's third game in 4 days and two of their players were replaced by members of the Kenyan team due to injury.

8 October 1962
Friendly

Uganda	1–1	Isthmian League
Jimmy Kirunda 44'	Report	Norman Field 85'

Nakivubo Stadium, Kampala, Uganda
Attendance: N/A

== Top Scorers ==
Pos	Scorer	Goals
1	(Ghana) Edward Acquah	4
2=	(Ghana) Wilberforce Mfum	3
2=	(Kenya) Norman Curtis	3
