= 1964–65 African Cup of Champions Clubs =

1964-65 African Cup of Champions Clubs
Kwame Nkrumah Cup

Tournament details
- Dates: 10 April 1964 – 12 February 1965
- Teams: 14

Final positions
- Champions: (Cameroon) Oryx Douala (1st title)
- Runners-up: (Mali) Stade Malien

Tournament statistics
- Matches played: 15
- Goals scored: 64 (4.27 per match)
- Top scorer: (Mali) Salif Kéïta (3 goals)

The 1964–65 African Cup of Champions Clubs, known as Kwame Nkrumah Cup was the first edition of the annual international club football competition held in the CAF region (Africa), the African Cup of Champions Clubs. It determined that year's club champion of association football in Africa.

The tournament was played by 14 teams. They were split in 3 groups, with each group winner qualifying to the final tournament held in Ghana. Oryx Douala from Cameroon won the final, and became the first CAF club champion.

== Preliminary round ==
Fourteen teams entered the preliminary round, divided over three zones.

Real Republicans of Ghana qualified as the host of the final tournament.

=== North-Eastern Zone ===
==== First round ====
| Team 1 | Agg. | Team 2 | 1st leg | 2nd leg |
|---|---|---|---|---|
| Cotton Factory Club (Ethiopia) | w/o | (Sudan) Al-Hilal | — | — |
| El-Tersana (United Arab Republic) | bye | | — | — |

==== Second round ====
| Team 1 | Agg. | Team 2 | 1st leg | 2nd leg |
|---|---|---|---|---|
| Cotton Factory Club (Ethiopia) | w/o | (United Arab Republic) El-Tersana | — | — |

Cotton Factory Club qualified.

=== Western Zone ===
==== First round ====
| Team 1 | Agg. | Team 2 | 1st leg | 2nd leg |
|---|---|---|---|---|
| Stade Malien (Mali) | 5–1 | (Senegal) Espoir de Saint-Louis | 4–0 | 1–1 |
| Sily CK (Guinea) | 6–4 | (Liberia) Invincible Eleven | 4–1 | 2–3 |
| ASEC Mimosas (Ivory Coast) | w/o | (Togo) Étoile Filante | — | — |
| AS Porto-Novo (Republic of Dahomey) | w/o | (Nigeria) Port Harcourt FC | — | — |

5 April 1964

| Stade Malien (Mali) | 4–0 | (Senegal) Espoir de Saint-Louis |

Bamako

| Espoir de Saint-Louis (Senegal) | 1–1 | (Mali) Stade Malien |

Dakar

Stade Malien won 5–1 on aggregate.

12 April 1964

| Sily CK (Guinea) | 4–1 | (Liberia) Invincible Eleven |

Conakry
25 April 1964

| Invincible Eleven (Liberia) | 3–2 | (Guinea) Sily CK |

Monrovia

Sily CK won 6–4 on aggregate.

| ASEC Mimosas (Ivory Coast) | w/o | (Togo) Étoile Filante |

ASEC Mimosas won after Étoile Filante withdrew.

| AS Porto-Novo (Republic of Dahomey) | w/o | (Nigeria) Port Harcourt FC |

AS Porto-Novo won after Port Harcourt FC withdrew.

==== Second round ====
| Team 1 | Series | Team 2 | Game 1 | Game 2 | Game 3 |
|---|---|---|---|---|---|
| Sily CK (Guinea) | 6–7 | (Mali) Stade Malien | 4–2 | 0–2 | 2–3 |
| AS Porto-Novo (Republic of Dahomey) | 3–5 | (Ivory Coast) ASEC Mimosas | 2–1 | 1–4 | |

7 June 1964

| Sily CK (Guinea) | 4–2 | (Mali) Stade Malien |

Conakry
22 June 1964

| Stade Malien (Mali) | 2–0 | (Guinea) Sily CK |

Bamako

As the aggregate finished 4–4, a replay was required.

24 June 1964

| Stade Malien (Mali) | 3–2 | (Guinea) Sily Club de Kindia |

Bamako

Stade Malien qualified.

19 July 1964

| AS Porto-Novo (Republic of Dahomey) | 2–1 | (Ivory Coast) ASEC Mimosas |

Porto-Novo
15 November 1964

| ASEC Mimosas (Ivory Coast) | 4–1 | (Republic of Dahomey) AS Porto-Novo |

Bamako

ASEC Mimosas won 5–3 on aggregate.

==== Third round ====
| Team 1 | Agg. | Team 2 | 1st leg | 2nd leg |
|---|---|---|---|---|
| Stade Malien (Mali) | 9–7 | (Ivory Coast) ASEC Mimosas | 3–3 | 6–4 |

13 December 1964

| Stade Malien (Mali) | 3–3 | (Ivory Coast) ASEC Mimosas |

Bamako

| ASEC Mimosas (Ivory Coast) | 4–6 | (Mali) Stade Malien |

Abidjan

Stade Malien won 9–7 on aggregate and qualified.

=== Central-South-Western Zone ===
| Team 1 | Agg. | Team 2 | 1st leg | 2nd leg |
|---|---|---|---|---|
| Oryx Douala (Cameroon) | 5–4 | (Democratic Republic of the Congo) CS Imana | 3–2 | 2–2 |

| Oryx Douala (Cameroon) | 3–2 | (Democratic Republic of the Congo) CS Imana |

Douala

| CS Imana (Democratic Republic of the Congo) | 2–2 | (Cameroon) Oryx Douala |

Kinshasa

Oryx Douala won 5–4 on aggregate and qualified.

== Final tournament ==
The final tournament was held in Accra and Kumasi, Ghana.

Semi-finals
31 January – Accra
(Ghana) Real Republicans | 1
(Cameroon) Oryx Douala | 2
4 February – Kumasi
(Ethiopia) Cotton Factory Club | 1
(Mali) Stade Malien | 3

Final
7 February – Accra
(Cameroon) Oryx Douala | 2
(Mali) Stade Malien | 1
Third-place match
5 February – Accra
(Ghana) Real Republicans | 3
(Ethiopia) Cotton Factory Club | 1

=== Semi-finals ===
31 January 1965

| Real Republicans (Ghana) | 1–2 | (Cameroon) Oryx Douala |
|---|---|---|
| Tawiah 2' | | Ebellé 63'; Epétè 75' |

Accra Stadium, Accra
Attendance: 50,000

4 February 1965

| Cotton Factory Club (Ethiopia) | 1–3 | (Mali) Stade Malien |
|---|---|---|
| Diallo 68' (o.g.) | | Kéïta 5', 54'; Sinaté 50' |

Sports Stadium, Kumasi
Attendance: 25,000

=== Bronze-medal match ===
5 February 1965

| Real Republicans (Ghana) | 3–1 | (Ethiopia) Cotton Factory Club |
|---|---|---|
| Pare 57'; Gbadamosi 65'; Odametey 79' (pen.) | | Abdelle 50' |

Accra Stadium, Accra
Attendance: 50,000

=== Final ===
7 February 1965
--:-- UTC+0

| Oryx Douala (Cameroon) | 2–1 | (Mali) Stade Malien |
|---|---|---|
| Koum 41'; Ebellé 65' | | Sinaté 85' |

Accra Stadium, Accra
Attendance: 30,000
Referee: Anthony Arthur (Liberia)

== Champion ==
1964–65 African Cup of Champions Clubs

Oryx Douala
First Title

== Top scorers ==
The top scorers from the 1964–65 African Cup of Champions Clubs are as follows:

| Rank | Name | Team | Goals |
|---|---|---|---|
| 1 | (Mali) Salif Kéïta | (Mali) Stade Malien | 3 |
| 2 | (Cameroon) Walter Ebellé | (Cameroon) Oryx Douala | 2 |
| 2 | (Mali) Tiémoko Sinaté | (Mali) Stade Malien | 2 |
