= India 99–1 Nigeria =

Football urban legend

In Nigeria and Ghana, a popular urban exists that describes how the Indian men's national football team—using shapeshifting and juju—took on their nation's national team, scoring 99 goals in a match that ultimately ended in the death of an African player shortly after scoring a penalty, resulting in India's ban from all FIFA competitions. Tracing its roots to the early 1970s, news of the fictional event spread primarily through word-of-mouth and has several variations that differ in the scoreline, deceased player, and other details of the game.

== Legend ==
In most Nigerian variations of the match, the Indian team agreed that one goal from the Nigerian team would award their side victory—thus motivating the Indian players to use advanced juju, employing black magic as they shapeshifted and scored goals in a dramatic fashion. Prior to kickoff, the Indian players entered the field either by exiting the referee's pocket or through a bottle placed in the center of the field, using lions and fire as they stunned the African players and easily scored against their goalkeeper. Ultimately, Nigeria was awarded a penalty in the final seconds of the game and scored to win the match, despite the 98-goal deficit. Depending on region of the storyteller, the player who scored the sole goal varies, but in most versions is either Mudashiru Lawal, Teslim Balogun, Samuel Okwaraji, or Rashidi Yekini. As for Okwaraji, he did indeed pass away during an official match, but during a World Cup qualification match against Angola in 1989 and not against India.

The story's longevity can be attributed to the fact that India was banned for an unrelated reason in 1950 and that the tale takes advantage of popular beliefs in traditional black magic, combining traditional beliefs and sensational storytelling with popular culture.

=== Ghana version ===
In Ghana, the most common version of the legend states that the goalscorer was either Shamo Quaye, Baba Yara, or Wilberforce Mfum, who scored the penalty with the ball now transformed into a cooking pot. With the Indian players re-entering the bottle or pocket they came from, the Ghanian players carried the deceased goalscorer to the cemetery as they claimed victory. Several journalists, former players, and the Ghana Football Association have repeatedly denied that the match occurred.
