= Ofei Dodoo =

Ghanaian footballer

Personal information
- Full name: Henry Emmanuel Ofei Dodoo
- Date of death: 30 April 2004
- Place of death: Ghana
- Position: Midfielder

Senior career*
Years	Team	Apps	(Gls)
1954	New Horizon		
1956 - 1962	Hearts of Oak		
1962 - 1966	Real Republicans		

International career
1960 - 1964	Ghana		
Medal record
Men's Football
Representing Ghana
Africa Cup of Nations
Winner	1963 Ghana
- * Club domestic league appearances and goals

Henry Emmanuel Ofei Dodoo (died 2004) was a Ghanaian footballer. He was affectionately called the "little bird".

== Football career ==
Dodoo played for the Hearts of Oak football club. He graduated into the first team from their Youth Team and was a member of the team that won the first Ghana league trophy in 1958. Prior to playing for Hearts, he was the captain of New Horizon football club. He captained the team which played and won a special Independence match trophy in Lusaka, Zambia in 1954. He was one of two Hearts players selected to play for the elite football team, Real Republicans by Ohene Djan. The other was Charles Odametey. This team featured various Ghanaian stars until it was dissolved in 1966 following the coup that toppled the Nkrumah government. He was also in the Ghana Black Stars team that won the 1963 African Cup of Nations hosted in Ghana. This was the first time Ghana won the competition.

Dodoo was named in a 55-man shortlist for the best 22 Ghanaian football players ever.

== Death ==
He died on 30 April 2004 in Ghana and was laid to rest in Accra on Saturday 19 June 2004.
