= Gyau =

Gyau is a surname. Notable people with the surname include:

- Joe Gyau (born 1992), American soccer player
- Joseph Agyemang-Gyau (1939–2015), Ghanaian soccer player and traditional ruler
- Phillip Gyau (born 1966), American soccer player and coach
