= John Mensah =

Ghanaian footballer (born 1982)

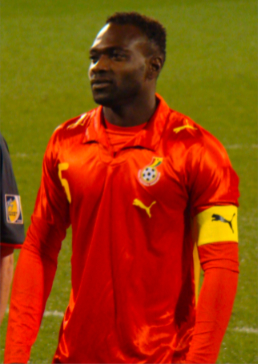
- John Mensah with Ghana in 2008

Personal information
- Full name: John Mensah
- Date of birth: 29 November 1982 (age 43)
- Place of birth: Obuasi, Ashanti, Ghana
- Height: 1.84 m (6 ft 0 in)
- Position: Centre back

Youth career
- 1999–2000: MBC Accra
- 2000: Bologna

Senior career*
Years	Team	Apps	(Gls)
2000–2002	Bellinzona	34	(1)
2001–2002	→ Genoa (loan)	24	(3)
2002–2006	Chievo	22	(0)
2004	→ Modena (loan)	6	(0)
2005–2006	→ Cremonese (loan)	14	(0)
2006–2008	Rennes	60	(2)
2008–2012	Lyon	13	(0)
2009–2011	→ Sunderland (loan)	34	(1)
2012–2013	Rennes	4	(0)
2013	Asante Kotoko	0	(0)
2014	Nitra	5	(0)
2016	AFC Eskilstuna	0	(0)
Total		217	(7)

International career
2001–2012	Ghana	86	(3)
Medal record
Representing Ghana
Men's football
Africa Cup of Nations
Third place	2008 Ghana
- * Club domestic league appearances and goals

John Mensah (born November 29, 1982) is a Ghanaian former professional footballer who played as a defender. A center-half by choice, he is also adept at right-back and has played in both positions for the Ghana national team, also captaining the Black Stars on occasions. Mensah's physique has earned him the moniker "Rock of Gibraltar".

Born in Obuasi, Ashanti, Mensah is a product of the scouting system in Ghana. He spent the 2009–10 and 2010–11 seasons on loan at English club Sunderland in the Premier League.

Mensah was named to Ghana's squad for the 2006 and 2010 FIFA World Cup.

== Club career ==
=== Early career ===
Born in Obuasi, Ashanti, Mensah began playing at a young age, which saw him join MBC Accra. As a teenager, Mensah then moved to Italy to join Bologna and went on to make two appearances for the side, both coming from Coppa Italia. Mensah then spent two years at Swiss side Bellinzona, where he honed his talents, and despite his lack of speed, many scouts have overlooked his talent. Mensah, nevertheless, showed great positioning and awareness.

Ahead of the 2001–02 season, Mensah returned to Italy to sign for Serie B side Genoa. He made his Genoa debut in the Copa Italia match against Treviso in the Group Stage on August 20, 2001, coming on as a second-half substitute, in a 2–1 win. A month later, on September 23, 2001, Mensah made his league debut for the club, coming on as an 86th-minute substitute, in a 3–0 win against Messina. Since making his debut for Genoa, he has found himself in and out of the starting line-up, mostly coming from the substitute bench. Mensah then scored his first goal for the club, in a 2–1 loss against Cosenza on November 11, 2001. After returning from his international commitment, he returned to the starting line-up, starting the whole game in a 0–0 draw against Messina on February 17, 2002. After missing a match due to injury, Mensah then helped the club keep four consecutive clean sheets between March 10 and April 8, 2002. He then scored his second goal for the club in a 4–3 loss against Crotone on May 5, 2002. It was not until June 2, 2002, that Mensah scored his third goal for the club in a 2–2 draw against Reggina in the last game of the season. At the end of the 2001–02 season, he went on to make 26 appearances, scoring three times in all competitions.

=== Chievo ===
It was announced on 11 June 2002 that Mensah signed a permanent transfer to Chievo in summer 2002.

Having spent three months on the substitute bench since joining the club, Mensah made his debut for Chievo, starting the whole game, he helped the side keep a clean sheet in a 2–0 win against Modena on 6 October 2002. However throughout the 2002–03 season, he found that opportunities in his first team were limited. Mensah went on to make fourteen appearances in all competitions.

Having made two appearances for Chievo in the first half of the 2003–04 season, Mensah joined Modena, which was a punctuated a moderately successful three-year stint in Verona. He made his Modena debut, and played 29 minutes, due to suffering from an injury in a 2–1 win against Ancona on 8 February 2004. After spending a month on the sidelines over injury, Mensah made his return to the starting line–up, in a 2–1 loss against Reggina on 21 March 2004. At the end of the 2003–04 season, he made six appearances for Modena.

Following his loan spell at Modena came to an end, Mensah returned to Chievo ahead of the 2004–05 season. He then played in both legs against Torino in Coppa Italia, which saw Chievo lose 2–1 on aggregate. However, Mensah continued to find his first team opportunities at the club limited throughout the season. It was not until on 16 January 2005 when he made his first league appearance of the season, starting the whole game, in a 2–2 draw against Roma. Mensah was later featured in and out of the starting line–up as the season goes by. However, he was sent–off for a straight red card, in a 1–0 loss against Sampdoria on 6 March 2005. Despite this, Mensah went on to make eleven appearances in all competitions.

At the start of the 2005–06 season, Mensah was loaned out to Serie B side Cremonese. He made his Cremonese debut, starting the whole game, in a 3–1 loss against Pescara on 17 September 2005. Since making his debut for the club, Mensah quickly established himself in the starting eleven for the side. He later made fourteen appearances for the side and returned to his parent club. However, following another uneventful move to Cremonese, Mensah came to the conclusion a new stable environment was what was required to kick-start his somehow journey-man career.

=== Rennes ===
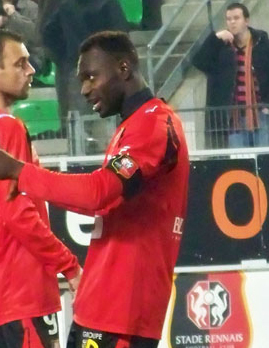
John Mensah pictured as a captain during his time at Rennes.

On 31 January 2006, during the winter transfer window, Mensah moved to French Ligue 1 club Rennes on loan after having played in Italy for most of his career, at the behest of their former player Philippe Redon, who brought him to fill the gap in defence caused by an injury to Abdeslam Ouaddou. Upon joining the club, he said: "In fact, I'm going into the unknown! I don't know anything about France! I just remember playing in 2001 against the French Espoirs during the U20 World Cup in Argentina. I remember that there was Cisse in front. But I did however have good advice on the level of the L1, in particular by my compatriot Mickaël Essien. I don't know many players in Rennes either. I just know that there is a good coach at the head of the team."

Mensah made his Stade Rennais debut, starting the whole game, in a 2–0 loss against Bordeaux on 11 February 2006. Since making his debut, he quickly established himself for the club, playing in the centre–back position. Mensah then helped the side keep four consecutive clean sheets between 11 March 2006 and 31 March 2006. During which, he scored his first goal for the club, in a 2–0 win against Troyes on 25 March 2006. Despite suffering from a thigh injury, Mensah made fourteen appearances and scoring once in all competitions. High-level performances in the league convinced Rennes to make the loan deal permanent in April 2006, which Mensah signed a three-year contract with the side.

However at the start of the 2006–07 season, Mensah was sidelined with a calf injury that saw him out for a month. It was not until on 9 September 2006 when he made his first appearance of the season, starting the whole game, in a 2–1 win against Sochaux. Since making his return from injury, Mensah's performance led the club's website published an article on Mensah's impact on his new team. It said, "The summary from 11 February 2006 to 28 September 2006: 18 games: 12 wins, 5 draws, 1 defeat. 12 conceded goals, 4 of them when Mensah was not on the field. Rennes conceded 0.66 goals per game with Mensah. Without Mensah Rennes had 6 games, 0 wins, 1 draw and five losses. 13 goals were conceded, making 2.66 per game." He then regained his first team place for the next seven matches before being sidelined with an injury that kept him out for two months. In November 2006, Mensah was rated the number 1 player in France France Football magazine, level with Juninho, in the 2006–07 season's "Top 100 French League players". It was not until on 14 January 2007 when Mensah returned to the starting line–up, in a 2–0 loss against Marseille. He then followed up with the next three matches by keeping three consecutive clean sheets between 24 January 2007 and 3 February 2007. After being sidelined on two more occasions later in the 2006–07 season, Mensah continued to regain his first team place, playing in the centre–back position. At the end of the 2006–07 season, he went on to make twenty–five appearances in all competitions. For his performance, Mensah finished second place behind Mario Melchiot for the club's best player of the year. Following this, it was announced on 17 May 2007 that Mensah signed a contract extension with Rennes, lasting until 2010. "I am very lucky to be able to stay one year more with such an ambitious club, especially since a lot of clubs wanted me", Mensah told L'Équipe. Rennes head coach Pierre Dréossi said, "Those who wanted to see him at another club can now forget my telephone number."

At the start of the 2007–08 season, Mensah started in the first three league matches before suffering a thigh injury that kept him out for a month. However, during a 1–0 win against Saint-Étienne on 15 August 2007, he suffered a thigh injury that kept him out for a month. It was not until on 16 September 2007 when Mensah returned to the starting line–up, starting the whole game, in a 1–0 win against FC Lorient. Since returning from injury, he regained his first team place for the rest of the 2007 despite being on two occasions. Mensah also made his European debut, starting the whole game, in a 1–1 draw against Brann on 9 November 2007. After spending a month, due to international commitment, it was not until on 16 February 2008 when he returned to the starting line–up, as Stade Rennais lose 3–1 against Lille. Mensah was later appointed as the club's captain for the rest of the 2007–08 season after being appointed by Guy Lacombe, as well as, regaining his first team place since returning from international duty. It was not until on 10 May 2008 when he scored his first goal of the season, in a 2–1 win against Toulouse. Despite missing two more matches later in the 2007–08 season,

In the summer transfer window of 2008, Mensah was linked with Portsmouth, which also looked likely to be his future destination due to strong presence of African players, along with his international teammate Sulley Muntari at the club. He was also linked with a transfer to Wigan Athletic. An enquiry from Wigan for the Ghanaian was welcomed by Rennes, with assistant coach Philippe Redon commenting it would take at least £7 million to prize the "Rock of Gibraltar" from the club. He was made Rennes' team captain in January 2008 until his exit that summer. Following his departure, Rennes head coach Guy Lacombe lamented he had hoped to keep his captain because his exit will mean a re-examination of their playing system and that, "[H]e will not go to an average club. If John leaves, he will do it only for something that one cannot propose to him here."

=== Lyon ===
On 26 April 2007, it was reported in the French media that Mensah was being seriously scouted by Lyon with a view to making a move for him in that summer's transfer window. On 18 June 2008, new Lyon head coach Claude Puel made it his priority to sign Mensah to replace centre-back Sébastien Squillaci, who departed to Sevilla in La Liga. Negotiations continued for the following four weeks, and on 15 July 2008, Lyon's special adviser Bernard Lacombe contacted Mensah and negotiated a five-year contract with him. However, Rennes dismissed Lyon's initial interest. Lyon club owner Jean-Michel Aulas offered the Breton club only €6 million, a figure that did not appease Rennes general manager Pierre Dréossi. But the French media said Mensah will sign for Lyon in an €8 million transfer. On 21 July 2008, Mensah finally signed a five-year contract with Lyon in an €8.4 million transfer. He was presented to the media at 20:00 that day. During the press conference, Aulas stated Mensah was recommended to them by ex-Lyon midfielder Michael Essien. Mensah took the number 15 shirt, and became the third Ghanaian player to ever play for Lyon, after Abedi Pele and Essien.

However, his start to Lyon's career backfired when he missed a month, due to injury. It was not until on 13 September 2008 when Mensah made his Lyon debut, starting the whole game, in a 3–2 win over Nice. Two weeks later on 30 September 2008, he made his UEFA Champions League debut, starting the whole game, in a 1–1 draw against Bayern Munich. However, during a 2–2 draw against Lille on 18 October 2008, Mensah suffered tear to his groin muscle and was sidelined for a month. Instead, he played in left (with the absence of Fabio Grosso) or right-back (with the absence of Anthony Réveillère and François Clerc.) Despite this, Mensah kept three consecutive clean sheets in his playing time between 29 November 2008 and 20 December 2008. He continued to spend the second half of the season on the substitutes' bench or out injured. In a 3–1 win over Le Havre on 15 February 2009, Mensah was racially abused by Le Havre fans when he was targeted during the pre-match warm-up and throughout the first half. Lyon head coach Claude Puel insisted he should stay on the field throughout the match, only to receive a red card after a second bookable offence. After the match, the club expressed outraged over racial abuse on Mensah. Mensah spoke out about racism and told L'Équipe it not only left him homesick, but also affected his career. A Le Havre fan, who racially abused Mensah, was later charged for making racist insults after being arrested by the police and was released on bail. If convicted, he risked up to six months in prison and a fine. The fan, aged 21, admitted his actions. His sending-off was upheld and miss one match ban by the Ligue de Football Professionnel Disciplinary Committee. Their action received criticism from critics, and that the referee Alain Hamer was treating Mensah harshly. In the last match of the Ligue 1 season, Mensah once again received a red card after a second bookable offence when he made a dangerous tackle on André-Pierre Gignac in 0–0 draw against Toulouse. The 2008–09 season saw Lyon ended its seven-year streak of winning the Ligue 1 championship, placing third behind champions Bordeaux and second-placed Marseille. Despite this, he went on to make seventeen appearances in all competitions.

It was reported on 31 July 2009 that Mensah announced his intention to leave the club, as a result of lack of first team opportunities.

=== Sunderland ===
On 15 August 2009, various sources in France reported Mensah would be joining English Premier League club Sunderland on loan for the season, with the club also having the option to permanently purchase the player for €7 million after the season. Six days later on 21 August 2009, Mensah successfully passed his medical and, one week later, was awarded his work permit by the Court of Arbitration for Sport, officially completing the move.

Mensah made his debut for Sunderland on 12 September 2009, coming on as a 77th-minute substitute against Hull City in a 4–1 win. He then made his full debut in the League Cup match, winning 2–0 over Birmingham City on 22 September and even managed to put the ball in the net, although it was disallowed for a foul on Blues goalkeeper Maik Taylor. However, Mensah's start to his Sunderland career has been hampered with the constant reoccurrence of a calf injury. It was not until on 21 November 2009 when he returned to the starting line–up, helping Sunderland win 1–0 win against Arsenal. However, his return was short–lived when Mensah was sidelined with another calf injury. But he returned from injury, coming on as an 82nd-minute substitute, in a 2–0 loss against Aston Villa on 15 December 2009. Four days later on 19 December 2009, Mensah scored his first Sunderland goal, in a 4–3 loss against Manchester City. So far Notwithstanding, teammate Michael Turner described Mensah as the best defender he has ever played with. Mensah became a favourite amongst the Sunderland faithful, but his injury problems meant he would struggle to play much in the upcoming season. Despite this, Mensah continued to remain involved in the starting eleven for the side throughout the 2009–10 season. In his first season at Sunderland, he went on to make seventeen appearances and scoring once in all competitions.

Mensah re-joined Sunderland on loan for the 2010–11 season on 11 August. Mensah started Sunderland's first match of the season, a 2–2 draw against Birmingham City. However, injuries and the form of Titus Bramble and Michael Turner kept Mensah out of the starting line-up for most of the 2010–11 season. Nevertheless, he returned and helped the side keep three consecutive in three matches between 5 December 2010 and 18 December 2010 against West Ham United, Fulham and Bolton Wanderers. However, during a match against Bolton Wanderers on 18 December 2010, Mensah suffered an injury in the 21st minute, leading him to be substituted and was sidelined for a month. It was not until on 5 February 2011 when Mensah returned to the starting line–up, starting the whole game, in a 3–2 loss against Stoke City. However, he received a straight red card in a match against Liverpool on 20 March 2011 after a foul on Luis Suárez, although the card was later rescinded. But on 9 April 2011, Mensah suffered a Grade Two adductor tear just 11 minutes into Saturday's 3–2 home defeat by West Bromwich Albion, casting doubt on his future at Sunderland. Following this, Mensah was out of actions for three weeks until he made a return as an unused substitute in a 3–0 defeat to Fulham. Mensah made his return to the starting line–up, helping Sunderland win 2–1 against Bolton Wanderers on 7 May 2011. Mensah made his last appearance for Sunderland in a 3–1 loss against Wolverhampton Wanderers on 14 May 2011. At the end of the 2010–11 season, he made eighteen appearances in all competitions.

However, Sunderland manager Steve Bruce opted not to sign Mensah permanently because of his persistent injury problems, therefore returning to his parent club, Olympique Lyon. Previously, Mensah's loan contract included an option that the loan would be made permanent should Mensah appear in at least 25 Premier League matches.

=== Return to Olympique Lyonnais ===
After spending two seasons at Sunderland, Mensah returned to Olympique Lyonnais ahead of the 2011–12 season and made one appearance, on 8 July 2011 in a 1–0 friendly loss to Red Bull Salzburg, where he conceded a penalty for a foul and was subsequently issued a red card. It was not until on 21 September 2011 when Mensah made his first (and only) appearance of the season, starting the whole game, in a 1–0 loss against SM Caen, Following this, he was rarely used during the 2010–11 season due to injuries, and did not play a single match at Lyon that season.

It was announced on 2 July 2012, Mensah was released from the club after terminating his contract. After being released, Mensah was linked with moves to Bordeaux, Trabzonspor, Celtic and West Ham United.

=== Return to Rennes ===
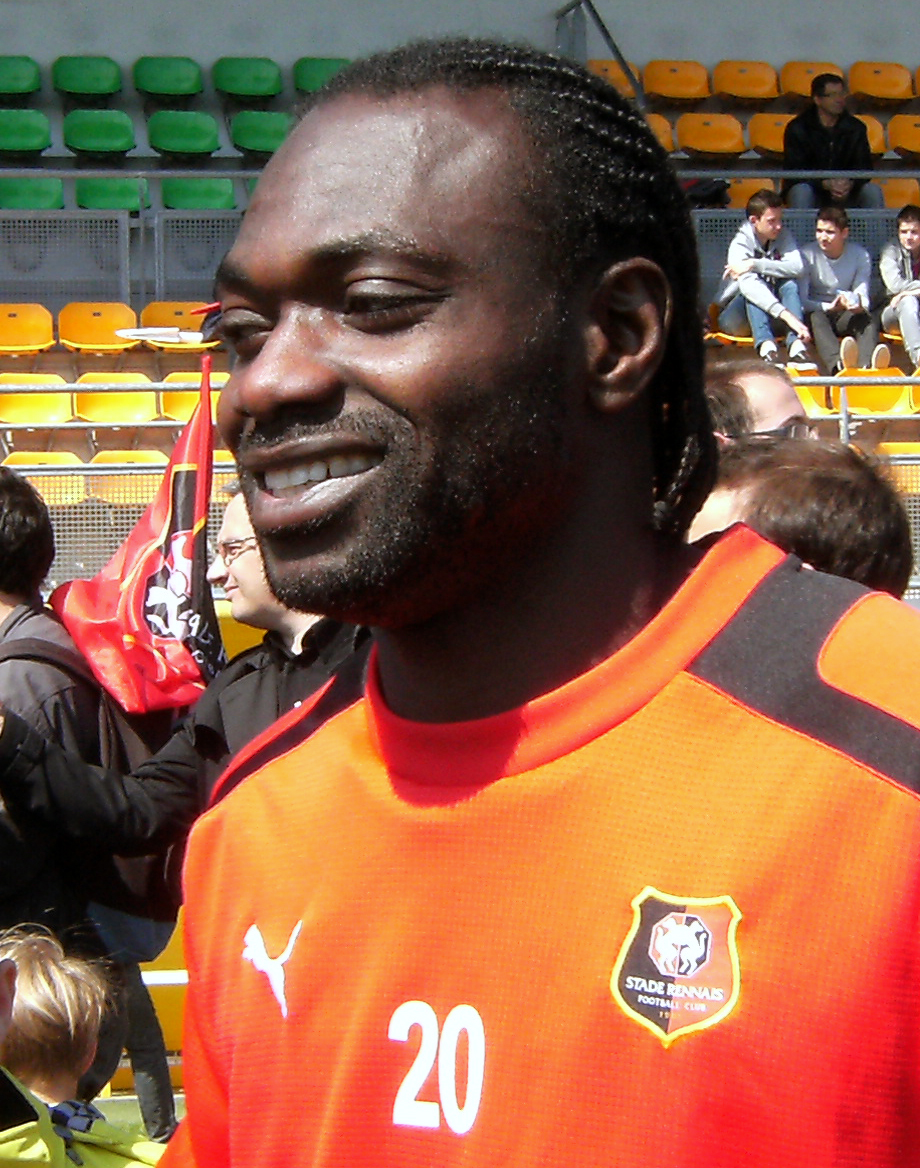
Mensah pictured in his second spell at Rennes.

On 2 January 2013, after having his Lyon contract terminated, Mensah returned as a free agent to Rennes, signing a six-month contract. Upon joining the club, he was issued the 25 number shirt.

Mensah made his "second debut" with Rennes in a 2–1 Coupe de France defeat to Lens. He spoke in an interview with BBC Sport that his second spell with the club would give him a chance to revive his football career. However, he was plagued with injuries. Despite this, Mensah appeared as an unused substitute in the Coupe de la Ligue Final, losing 1–0 against Saint-Étienne. However, after making six appearances in his second spell, he left the club after his future was uncertain.

=== FC Nitra ===
Following a short stay at Asante Kotoko, Mensah joined Corgoň liga side Nitra. Mensah made his Corgoň liga debut for Nitra during a home fixture against Slovan Bratislava, on 10 March 2014. He was featured in the starting-XI but was replaced by Lukáš Kutra after 45 minutes. Over the upcoming 2.5 months, Mensah only made 4 more appearances, due to an injury. He concluded his spell in Slovakia without a single goal or a contribution.

=== AFC United ===
Two years later, Mensah moved to Sweden to sign for AFC United. However, he made no appearances and left the club. A year later, Mensah said in an interview that he has yet retired from professional football.

== International career ==
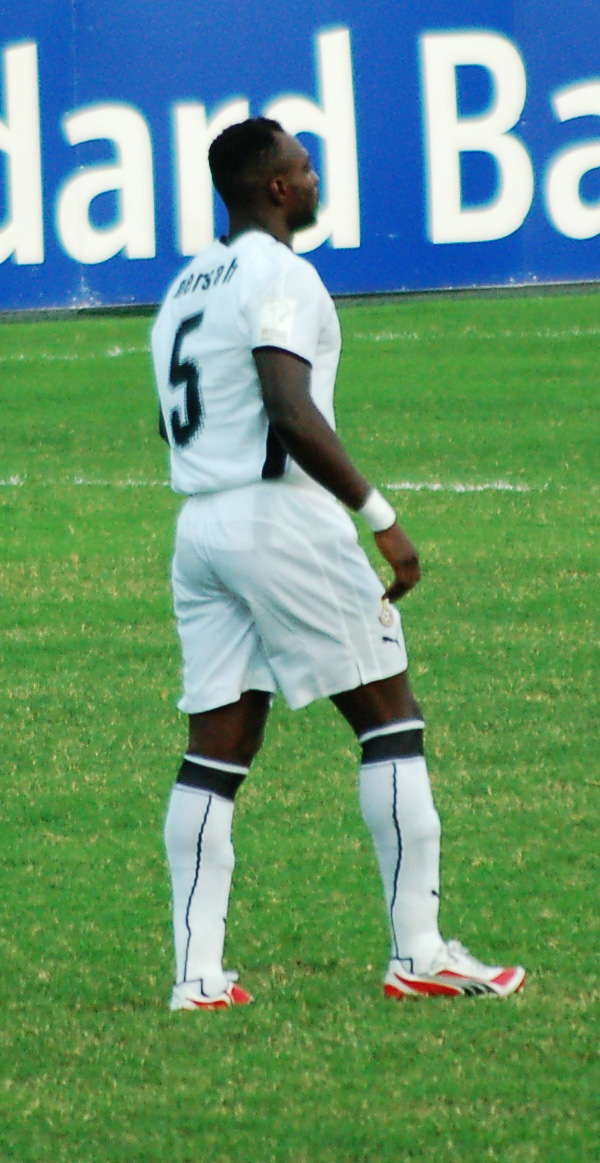
John Mensah playing for Ghana at the 2008 Africa Cup of Nations.

Mensah was included in the Ghana national under-20 team squad for the 2001 FIFA World Youth Championship in Argentina. During the tournament, he played a role against Brazil and scored in the fourth minute of extra time in the tournament's quarter-finals to send Ghana through. Mensah then started in the final, as Ghana lost 3–0 against the host nation Argentina.

Mensah's senior debut for Ghana was against Algeria on 5 December 2001, just after his 19th birthday, on the eve of the 2002 African Cup of Nations finals in Mali, a tournament at which his aerial ability was a prominent feature of Ghana's play. He made four appearances in the tournament, as Ghana was eliminated in the quarter–final following a 1–0 loss against Nigeria.

Mensah played for the Ghana Olympic team, known as the Black Meteors, in the 2004 Summer Olympics and played two times, as they finished in third place in Group B. Two years later, he participated in his second African Cup of Nations tournament in Egypt, and was selected for All-Star Team of the Tournament by the Confederation of African Football. Mensah was also solidity personified during Ghana's successful qualifying campaign for the 2006 FIFA World Cup.

Mensah was called up to the Ghana squad for the FIFA World Cup in Germany. He made his World Cup debut and started the whole game, in a 2–0 loss against Italy on 12 June 2006. Following a 2–0 win against Czech Republic, Mensah helped Ghana finish second place in Group E following a 2–1 victory over the United States in their final group match. After the final whistle, Mensah lifted his team jersey to reveal a T-shirt displaying "John Mensah – Rock of Gibraltar", his nickname in Ghana. However, in the round of 16, Ghana was eliminated by the defending champions, Brazil following a 3–0 loss. Ghana's head coach at the World Cup, Ratomir Dujković, would later cite Mensah for high commendations after the tournament.

In January 2008, Mensah was called up to the Ghana squad for the Africa Cup of Nations. Prior to the start to the tournament, he succeeded Stephen Appiah as captain. He played his first match of the tournament, starting game, in a 2–1 win against Guinea on 21 January 2008. Mensah then helped the side progress through to the knockout stage after keeping two clean sheets against Namibia and Morocco. On 3 February 2008, Mensah was sent off in a 2008 Africa Cup of Nations quarter-final match against Nigeria for a professional foul against Peter Odemwingie, as Ghana nonetheless won the match 2–1 with goals from Michael Essien and a later winner by Junior Agogo. He returned to the starting line–up against Ivory Coast in the third-place play-off, helping Ghana win 4–2.

In May 2010, Mensah was called up to the Ghana squad for the FIFA World Cup in South Africa. He was eventually named in the 23-man squad. Mensah captained Ghana for the first time in the tournament, starting the whole game and helped the national side win 1–0 against Serbia. Mensah later captained Ghana to an impressive quarter-final finish at the 2010 World Cup, where the Black Stars were eliminated on penalties by Uruguay following a 1–1 draw after extra time, in which he took the third penalty with his team, but it was saved by the opposition keeper, Fernando Muslera. A year later on 8 September 2011, Mensah scored his first goal for Ghana, in a 2–0 win against Sudan.

In December 2011, Mensah was named to the Ghana's squad for the 2012 Africa Cup of Nations, which was co-hosted by Equatorial Guinea and Gabon. In a match against Botswana on 24 January 2012, he scored his first goal of the tournament, but was sent–off in the 66th minute, in a 1–0 win. After serving a one match suspension, he didn't return until on 5 February 2012 when Mensah scored his second goal of the tournament, in a 2–1 win against Tunisia. He went on to play three times in tournament, as Ghana finished fourth place following a 2–0 defeat to Mali. Despite this, Mensah was included in the Confederation of African Football All-Stars team for the 2012 Africa Cup of Nations. It was not until on 15 August 2012 when he made his last Ghana appearance and played 45 minutes, in a 1–1 draw against China.

Following this, Mensah never played for the national team again despite calls from peers to convince Ghana to call him up. Throughout his international career at Ghana, Mensah has been a regular for the national team, playing almost every match since, rising in the rank of importance to become the assistant-captain and captain of the national team, earning 86 cap and scoring three times.

=== International goals ===
Goal #	Date	Venue	Opponent	Score	Result	Competition
1	8 October 2011	Al-Hilal Stadium, Khartoum, Sudan	Sudan	2–0	Win	2012 CAF Qualifying
2	24 January 2012	Stade de Franceville, Franceville, Gabon	Botswana	1–0	Win	2012 Africa Cup of Nations
3	5 February 2012	Stade de Franceville, Franceville, Gabon	Tunisia	2–1	Win	2012 Africa Cup of Nations
Correct as of 9 March 2017

== Personal life ==
In February 2002, Mensah is married and together, they have four children. However, they announced their divorce after a decade together. John Mensah got married again in November 2014.

John is the half-brother of Ghana national team player Ekow Benson and has two sisters and brothers. In October 2019, his mother died at age 78 after a short illness. Mensah's father John Attu Mensah was also a footballer who played for Cambridge United and the Ghana senior team, he died in June 2021.

== Honours ==
Ghana U20

- FIFA World Youth Championship runner-up: 2001

Ghana

- Africa Cup of Nations runner-up: 2010; third-place: 2008

Individual

- Ghana 2008 Samsung Fair Play Award
- Societe Generale Trophy: September 2006
- Ghana Player of the Year: 2006
- Africa Cup of Nations Team of the Tournament: 2012
