= Juan Paletta =

Argentine footballer

Personal information
- Place of birth: Rosario, Argentina
- Height: 5 ft 9 in (1.75 m)
- Position: Forward

Senior career*
Years	Team	Apps	(Gls)
1967	Ukrainian Nationals		
1968	Washington Whips	15	(9)
1969–1973	Philadelphia Spartans		
1974, 1976	Philadelphia Atoms	8	(1)
- * Club domestic league appearances and goals

Juan Paletta is a retired Argentinian football (soccer) forward who played in the North American Soccer League and American Soccer League who shared the ASL scoring title in 1970.

In 1967, Paletta signed with the Ukrainian Nationals of the American Soccer League. In 1968, he moved to the Washington Whips of the North American Soccer League. He was back in the American Soccer League with the Philadelphia Spartans. In 1970, he tied Willie Mfum for the league scoring title. In 1974, Paletta signed with the Philadelphia Atoms of the NASL. He did not play during the 1975 season. On March 23, 1976, Paletta rejoined the Atoms but saw no playing time that season.
