= 1966 African Cup of Champions Clubs =

Tournament details
- Teams: 13 (from 1 confederation)

Final positions
- Champions: (Ivory Coast) Stade d'Abidjan (1st title)
- Runners-up: (Mali) Real Bamako

Tournament statistics
- Matches played: 22
- Goals scored: 92 (4.18 per match)
- Top scorer: (Mali) Salif Kéïta (14 goals)

The African Cup of Champions Clubs 1966 was the 2nd edition of the annual international club football competition held in the CAF region (Africa), the African Cup of Champions Clubs. It determined that year's club champion of association football in Africa.

The tournament was played by 13 teams, with the winner of the previous edition (Oryx Douala) given a bye into the semi-finals. The structure of the tournament was a knock-out tournament with ties played home and away. Stade d'Abidjan from Côte d'Ivoire won the final, and became CAF club champion for the first time.

== Bracket ==
First Round
(Liberia) Invincible Eleven	2	0	2
(Mali) Real Bamako	3	6	9
(Guinea) Conakry I^{1}	3	3	w/o
(Senegal) US Gorée	0	0
(Ethiopia) Ethio-Cement	1	0	1
(Sudan) Al-Hilal	4	6	10
(Republic of the Congo) Diables Noirs	1	2	3
(Zaire) AS Dragons	2	0	2
(Togo) Étoile Filante (Lomé)	0	0	0
(Ghana) Asante Kotoko	3	3	6
(Republic of Upper Volta) Étoile Filante	2	1	3
(Ivory Coast) Stade d'Abidjan	0	4	4

Quarter-finals
(Mali) Real Bamako	2	3	5
(Guinea) Conakry I	1	2	3
(Sudan) Al-Hilal	6	4	10
(Republic of the Congo) Diables Noirs	1	1	2
(Ghana) Asante Kotoko	0	2	2
(Ivory Coast) Stade d'Abidjan	1	2	3

Semi-finals
(Cameroon) Oryx Douala	2	2	4
(Mali) Real Bamako	4	3	7
(Sudan) Al-Hilal	1	2	3
(Ivory Coast) Stade d'Abidjan	0	4	4

Final
(Mali) Real Bamako	3	1	4
(Ivory Coast) Stade d'Abidjan (a.e.t.)	1	4	5

^{1} US Gorée withdrew.

== First round ==
Team 1	Agg.	Team 2	1st leg	2nd leg
Conakry I (Guinea)	w/o^{1}	(Senegal) US Gorée	—	—
Diables Noirs (Republic of the Congo)	3–2	(Zaire) AS Dragons	1–2	2–0
Ethio-Cement (Ethiopia)	1–10	(Sudan) Al-Hilal	1–4	0–6
Étoile Filante (Lomé) (Togo)	0–6	(Ghana) Asante Kotoko	0–3	0–3
Étoile Filante (Republic of Upper Volta)	3–4	(Ivory Coast) Stade d'Abidjan	2–0	1–4
Invincible Eleven (Liberia)	2–9	(Mali) Real Bamako	2–3	0–6
Oryx Douala (Cameroon)	bye			

^{1} US Gorée withdrew.

== Quarter-finals ==
Team 1	Agg.	Team 2	1st leg	2nd leg
Al-Hilal (Sudan)	10–2	(Republic of the Congo) Diables Noirs	6–1	4–1
Asante Kotoko (Ghana)	2–3	(Ivory Coast) Stade d'Abidjan	0–1	2–2
Real Bamako (Mali)	5–3	(Guinea) Conakry I	2–1	3–2
Oryx Douala (Cameroon)	bye			

== Semi-finals ==
Team 1	Agg.	Team 2	1st leg	2nd leg
Al-Hilal (Sudan)	3–4	(Ivory Coast) Stade d'Abidjan	1–0	2–4
Oryx Douala (Cameroon)	4–7	(Mali) Real Bamako	2–4	2–3

== Final ==
11 December 1966
--:-- UTC+0

Real Bamako (Mali)	3–1	(Ivory Coast) Stade d'Abidjan
Kéïta 57' (pen.), ?'; Nani 77'		Peters 1'

Stade Omnisports, Bamako
Attendance: 30 000
25 December 1966
--:-- UTC+0

Stade d'Abidjan (Ivory Coast)	4–1 (a.e.t.)	(Mali) Real Bamako
Déhi 15', 26'; Peters 75'; Bléziri 117'		Ballani ?'

Stade Félix Houphouët-Boigny, Abidjan
Attendance: 40 000

Stade d'Abidjan won 5–4 on aggregate.

== Champion ==
1966 African Cup of Champions Clubs

Stade d'Abidjan
First Title

== Top scorers ==
The top scorers from the 1966 African Cup of Champions Clubs are as follows:

Rank	Name	Team	Goals
1	(Mali) Salif Kéïta	(Mali) Real Bamako	14
2	(Sudan) Jaxa	(Sudan) Al-Hilal	7
3	(Sudan) Mustafa Shawish	(Sudan) Al-Hilal	5
4	(Mali) Adama Haidara	(Mali) Real Bamako	4
5	(Cameroon) Samuel Mbappé Léppé	(Cameroon) Oryx Douala	3
5	(Sudan) Sidig Mohamed Ahmed	(Sudan) Al-Hilal	3
7	(Republic of the Congo) Bistouri	(Republic of the Congo) Diables Noirs	2
7	(Ivory Coast) Henri Ahibo	(Ivory Coast) Stade d'Abidjan	2
7	(Ivory Coast) Maurice Déhi	(Ivory Coast) Stade d'Abidjan	2
7	(Mali) Idrissa Kante	(Mali) Real Bamako	2
7	(Sudan) Abdel Mahmoud Ibrahim	(Sudan) Al-Hilal	2
