= Willie Evans (footballer, born 1939) =

Ghanaian footballer (1939–?)

Personal information
- Date of birth: 21 November 1939
- Date of death: c. 2014 (aged 74–75)
- Position: Defender

Youth career
- Auroras Park

Senior career*
Years	Team	Apps	(Gls)
- Real Republicans
- Hearts of Oak
1967–1968	Atlanta Chiefs	24	(0)
1969–1971	Washington Darts	48	(0)
1972–1973	Miami Toros	23	(1)
Total		95	(1)

International career
- Ghana
- * Club domestic league appearances and goals

Willie Evans (21 November 1939 – c. 2014) was a Ghanaian footballer who played at both professional and international levels as a defender.

== Career ==
Evans start playing with Auroras Park before playing with Real Republicans, and with Hearts of Oak.

He later played professional soccer in the United States, competing in the NPSL, NASL and ASL for the Atlanta Chiefs, the Washington Darts, and the Miami Toros. He was named to the 1969 ASL All-Star Team.

Evans played international football for Ghana, and started on the team that won the 1965 African Cup of Nations in Tunisia.
