= Salif Keïta (Malian footballer) =

Malian footballer (1946–2023)

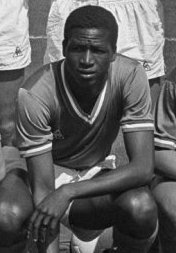
- Keita with Saint-Étienne in 1968

Personal information
- Full name: Salif Keita Traoré
- Date of birth: 6 December 1946
- Place of birth: Bamako, French Sudan
- Date of death: 2 September 2023 (aged 76)
- Place of death: Bamako, Mali
- Height: 1.76 m (5 ft 9 1/2 in)
- Position: Striker

Youth career
- 1960–1963: Stade Malien

Senior career*
Years	Team	Apps	(Gls)
1963–1965	Real Bamako	21	(8)
1965–1966	Stade Malien	24	(12)
1966–1967	Real Bamako	26	(15)
1967–1972	Saint-Étienne	149	(125)
1972–1973	Marseille	18	(10)
1973–1976	Valencia	74	(23)
1976–1979	Sporting CP	63	(32)
1979–1980	New England Tea Men	39	(17)
Total		414	(242)

International career
1963–1972	Mali	28	(13)
- * Club domestic league appearances and goals

Salif Keïta Traorè

Delegated minister of the Prime Minister of Mali
- In office 2007–2007

Personal details
- Born: 6 December 1946 Bamako, French Sudan
- Died: 2 September 2023, (aged 76) Bamako, Mali
- Occupation: Footballer, politician

Salif Keïta Traoré (6 December 1946 – 2 September 2023), known as Keita, was a Malian footballer who played as a striker. He was also the first person to receive the African Footballer of the Year award in 1970. He was nicknamed the 'Black Panther'.

== Early life ==
Like others in Bamako, he would grow up poor. So, he decided that he would play football in order to escape poverty. During his youth, his incredible talents led him to join Stade Malien and Real Bamako.

== Club career ==
Salif Keïta Traoré was born in Bamako, playing in his country for Real Bamako and Stade Malien. With the former, which he represented in two different spells, he was always crowned Première Division champion. At the first CAF Champions League in 1965, Stade Malien would lose 2-1 against the Oryx of Douala of Maréchal Mbappe Leppe and the year; after that, he would lose another final against Stade d'Abidjan.

In 1967, 20-year-old Keita left for France to join Saint-Étienne, where he won three consecutive Ligue 1 titles, including the double in 1968 and 1970. In his last two seasons with Les Verts combined, he scored an astonishing 71 league goals – 42 alone in the 1970–71 campaign – but the team failed to win any silverware; in 1970, he was voted African Footballer of the Year. He would also act in a film later on in his life about it.

Keita joined fellow league side Marseille in the 1972 summer. After the club tried to force him to assume French nationality he opposed, leaving in the ensuing off-season for Valencia in Spain.

Spanish newspapers were accused of racism when one headline read El Valencia va a por alemanes y vuelve con un negro ("Valencia goes out to buy Germans and comes back with a black man"), but he was always loved during his spell at the club, netting in his debut with the Che, a 2–1 La Liga home win against Real Oviedo, and being eventually nicknamed La perla negra de Malí (The black pearl of Mali); he complained, however, that he was constantly played out of position.

In 1976, after three years with Valencia, Keita signed for Sporting CP, where he replaced another legendary goalscorer, Héctor Yazalde. In two of his three seasons with the Lisbon side, he scored in double digits, winning one domestic cup. He retired at the age of 34, after a couple of years with Greater Boston area-based New England Tea Men, in the United States.

== International career ==
In 1963, at the age of only 16, Keita was selected to play for Mali. He was part of the squad that appeared at the 1972 African Cup of Nations in Cameroon, helping the national team finish second.

In June 2005, Keita was elected president of the Malian Football Federation for a period of four years. Late into the following year, he was selected by the Confederation of African Football as one of the best 200 African football players of the last 50 years.

== Personal life ==
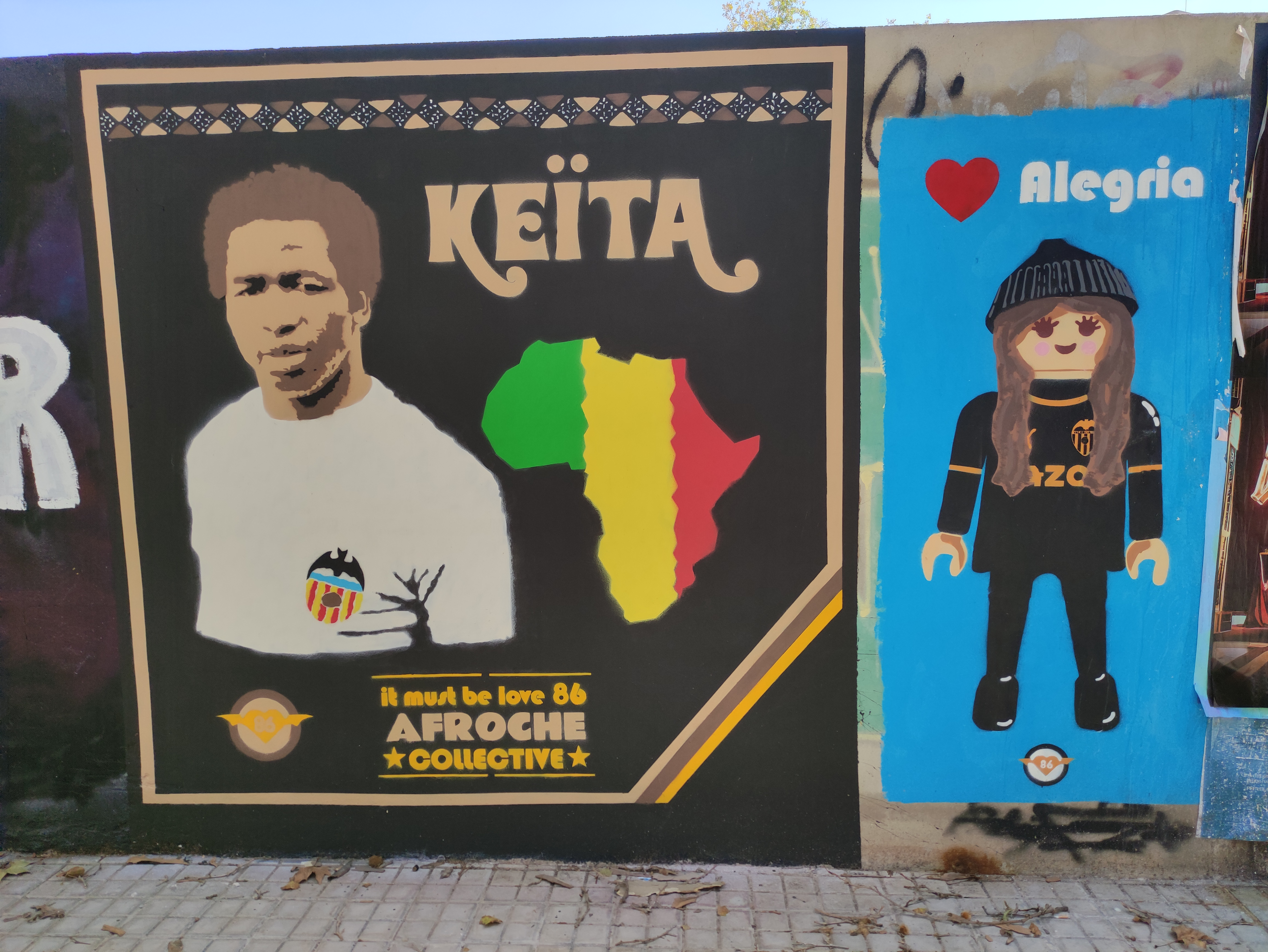
Homage to Salif Keïta near Mestalla, 2023.

Keita's nephew Seydou was also a footballer who also spent some time in France and later represented, with great team and individual success, Barcelona. Like his uncle, he played for Valencia, having a brief stint in 2014. Mohamed Sissoko, who played namely for Valencia, Liverpool and Juventus, was also his nephew; both played similar roles as central midfielders; another nephew, Sidi Yaya Keita, was also a footballer and a midfielder, who played most of his career in France with Lens.

After his retirement, he would return to Mali and invest in businesses and would create his own training center creating talents like Mahamadou Diarra and Seydou Keita who was his nephew. He would also be the president of the Malian Football Federation. He also became ambassador for Saint-Étienne for life.

Guinean film director Cheik Doukouré used the life of Keita as a starting point for his 1994 work Le Ballon d'or. In 1994, he created the first training center for professional football players in Mali, which bore his name.

From 2007, Keita acted as delegated minister of the Prime Minister of Mali.

Salif Keïta died on 2 September 2023, at the age of 76.

== Career statistics ==
=== Club ===
Appearances and goals by club, season and competition
Club	Season	League			Cup		Continental		Total	
Club	Season	Division	Apps	Goals	Apps	Goals	Apps	Goals	Apps	Goals
Real Bamako	1963–64									
Real Bamako	1964–65		21	8	0	0	1+	3	22+	11
Real Bamako	Total		21	8	0	0	1+	3	22+	11
Stade Malien	1965–66	Malian Première Division	24	12	0	0	5+	14	29+	26
Real Bamako	1966–67	Malian Première Division	26	15					26	15
Saint-Étienne	1967–68	Division 1	18	12					18	12
Saint-Étienne	1968–69	Division 1	33	21			2 (Note: Appearances in European Cup)	1	35	22
Saint-Étienne	1969–70	Division 1	31	21			4	1	35	22
Saint-Étienne	1970–71	Division 1	38	42			2	0	40	42
Saint-Étienne	1971–72	Division 1	29	29			2 (Note: Appearances in UEFA Cup)	0	32	29
Saint-Étienne	Total		149	125			10	2	159	127
Marseille	1972–73	Division 1	18	10			0	0	18	10
Valencia	1973–74	La Liga	30	7			—		30	7
Valencia	1974–75	La Liga	22	11			—		22	11
Valencia	1975–76	La Liga	22	5			—		22	5
Valencia	Total		74	23			—		74	23
Sporting CP	1976–77	Primeira Divisão	24	15			—		24	15
Sporting CP	1977–78	Primeira Divisão	21	7			2	0	23	7
Sporting CP	1978–79	Primeira Divisão	18	10			2 (Note: Appearances in European Cup Winners' Cup)	0	20	10
Sporting CP	Total		63	32			4	0	67	32
New England Tea Men	1979	NASL	21	6			—		21	6
New England Tea Men	1980	NASL	18	11			—		18	11
New England Tea Men	Total		39	17			—		39	17
Career total			414	242			20+	19	434	261

== Honours ==
Real Bamako

- Malian Cup: 1963–64, 1965–66, 1966–67
- African Cup of Champions Clubs: runner-up 1966

Stade Malien

- African Cup of Champions Clubs: runner-up 1965

Saint-Étienne

- Ligue 1: 1967–68, 1968–69, 1969–70; runner-up 1970–71
- Coupe de France: 1967–68, 1969–70
- Trophée des Champions: 1967, 1968, 1969

Sporting CP

- Primeira Liga: Runner-up 1976–77
- Taça de Portugal: 1977–78; runner-up 1978–79

Mali

- African Games: runner-up 1965
- Africa Cup of Nations: runner-up 1972

Individual

- African Cup of Champions Clubs: Best goalscorer 1965, 1966
- French Division 1 Foreign Player of the Year: 1968
- African Footballer of the Year: 1970

Decorations

- FIFA Order of Merit: 1996
