= Séry Wawa =

Ivorian footballer

Personal information
- Full name: Séry Wawa
- Date of birth: 1943
- Place of birth: Abidjan, Ivory Coast
- Date of death: 12 December 2013 (aged 70)
- Place of death: Abidjan, Ivory Coast
- Position: Defender

Séry Wawa (1943 – 12 December 2013) was an Ivorian footballer who primarily played as a defender.

Séry Wawa died on 12 December 2013, aged 70, in his hometown of Abidjan, Ivory Coast.
