= Habib Bâ =

Senegalese football player and manager

Personal information
- Place of birth: Senegal

Senior career*
| Years | Team | Apps | (Gls) |
- US Gorée
- Monaco

Managerial career
- US Gorée
- 1963–1965: Senegal
- * Club domestic league appearances and goals

Habib Bâ is a Senegalese former football player and manager.

== Playing career ==
Bâ began his career in his native Senegal, playing for US Gorée. On 8 May 1955, he scored in a 7–0 win against ASEC Mimosas in the 1955 French West African Cup final. Bâ later moved to Europe, signing for Monaco.

== Managerial career ==
After his playing career, Bâ returned to Senegal to manage US Gorée. During the mid-1960s, whilst still managing US Gorée, Bâ managed Senegal alongside Lybasse Diop. Under Bâ's management, in their first appearance at the tournament, Senegal finished fourth at the 1965 African Cup of Nations.
