= Juan Risso =

Argentine footballer (born 1942)

Personal information
- Full name: Juan Nazareno Risso
- Date of birth: 3 September 1942 (age 84)
- Place of birth: General Pirán, Mar Chiquita, Buenos Aires, Argentina
- Height: 1.71 m (5 ft 7 in)
- Position: Midfielder

Senior career*
| Years | Team | Apps | (Gls) |
| 1960–1964 | Gimnasia y Esgrima La Plata | 15 | (2) |
| 1967–1970 | AC Ajaccio | 88 | (7) |
| Total | | 103 | (9) |
- * Club domestic league appearances and goals

Juan Risso (born 3 September 1942) is an Argentine former footballer who competed in the 1964 Summer Olympics.

Risso spent three seasons in France with Ligue 1 side AC Ajaccio, where he scored seven goals in 88 league matches.
