= Ben Acheampong =

Ghanaian footballer (1939–2019)

Personal information
- Date of birth: 2 February 1939
- Date of death: 2019 (aged 79–80)
- Position: Defender

Senior career*
Years	Team	Apps	(Gls)
1958–1960	Cornerstone		
1960–1961	Kumasi Great Ashantis		
1961–1964	Asante Kotoko		
1964–1965	Real Republicans F.C. (Ghana)		

International career
- Ghana
- * Club domestic league appearances and goals

Benjamin Acheampong (2 February 1939 – 2019) was a Ghanaian footballer who played as a defender for Cornerstone, Kumasi Great Ashantis, Asante Kotoko, and Real Republicans F.C. (Ghana). He won the 1963 and 1965 African Cup of Nations titles with the Ghana national team under the tutelage of Charles Gyamfi. He tied for top-scoring honors in the 1965 competition with three goals. Acheampong died in 2019.
