= Lybasse Diop =

Senegalese footballer

Senior career*
Years	Team	Apps	(Gls)
- Foyer France Sénégal
- Bordeaux

Managerial career
- 1963–1965: Senegal
- Foyer France Sénégal
- * Club domestic league appearances and goals

Lybasse Diop is a Senegalese former professional footballer.

== Career ==
Diop began his career in his native Senegal, representing Foyer France Sénégal. Diop later managed Senegal alongside Habib Bâ during the mid-1960s.

Diop played for Bordeaux in the 1970s, becoming the first Senegalese player in Ligue 1. After injury cut his time at Bordeaux short, Diop returned to Senegal to manage Foyer France Sénégal.

== Personal life ==
His grandson Issa Diop is also a footballer.
