= Juan Carlos Sconfianza =

Argentine footballer

Personal information
- Date of birth: 13 July 1943 (age 83)
- Place of birth: Buenos Aires, Argentina
- Position: Defender

Youth career
- –1963: San Lorenzo

Senior career*
Years	Team	Apps	(Gls)
1963–1970	San Lorenzo	109	(0)
1971–1972	Toluca		
1972–1976	Puebla		

International career
- Argentina U23
- * Club domestic league appearances and goals

Juan Carlos Sconfianza (born 13 July 1943) is a retired Argentine football player.

== Career ==
Sconfianza began his playing career with Argentine first division club San Lorenzo de Almagro. He made his professional debut against Independiente on 4 August 1963, and would make 109 league appearances for the club during a seven-year stay. While playing for San Lorenzo in a friendly tournament in Spain, representatives of Real Madrid observed Sconfianza, but never made an official approach for his services.

In 1971, Sconfianza moved abroad to play for Toluca FC in the Primera División de México. One season later, he joined Puebla F.C. for four seasons, making 27 league appearances during the 1975–76 season.

Sconfianza was part of the Argentina squad at the 1964 Summer Olympics in Tokyo, but did not appear in any matches.
