= Norman Curtis =

English footballer and manager

Personal information
- Date of birth: 10 September 1924
- Place of birth: Dinnington, England
- Date of death: 7 September 2009 (aged 84)
- Height: 5 ft 8 in (1.73 m)
- Position: Full back

Senior career*
Years	Team	Apps	(Gls)
19??–1950	Gainsborough Trinity		
1950–1960	Sheffield Wednesday	310	(21)
1960–1961	Doncaster Rovers	39	(3)
1961–1965	Buxton		

Managerial career
- 1960–1961: Doncaster Rovers (player-manager)
- 1961–1965: Buxton (player-manager)
- * Club domestic league appearances and goals

Norman Curtis (10 September 1924 – 7 September 2009) was an English-born footballer, who played as a full back in the Football League in the 1950s and 1960s.

He started his Football League career at a relatively late age, moving from Gainsborough Trinity to Sheffield Wednesday in 1950 when aged 25. Curtis went on to make 324 senior appearances (scoring 24 goals) for Wednesday between 1950 and 1960. During his time at Wednesday the club experienced three promotions and three relegations between the First Division and the Second Division. He was nicknamed 'Cannonball' as when he took Wednesday's penalties he ran from inside his own half.

He moved to Doncaster Rovers for 1960–61 as a player-manager and made 39 league appearances before moving to Buxton for four years as player-manager.
