= Andrés Bertolotti =

Argentine footballer

Personal information
- Full name: Andrés Arturo Bertolotti
- Date of birth: 1 September 1943 (age 83)
- Place of birth: Rosario del Tala
- Position: Defender

Senior career*
Years	Team	Apps	(Gls)
- Chacarita Juniors
- * Club domestic league appearances and goals

Andrés Arturo Bertolotti (born 1 September 1943) is an Argentine former footballer who competed in the 1964 Summer Olympics.
