= Horacio Moráles =

Argentine footballer (1943–2021)

Personal information
- Full name: Oscar Horacio Moráles
- Date of birth: 27 June 1943
- Place of birth: Buenos Aires, Argentina
- Date of death: 26 February 2021 (aged 77)
- Place of death: Larissa, Greece
- Height: 1.82 m (6 ft 0 in)
- Position: Defender

Senior career*
Years	Team	Apps	(Gls)
1964–1965	Vélez Sarsfield	6	
1968–1969	Nueva Chicago	18	(1)
1969–1970	Unión	23	(2)
1970–1972	Atlanta	98	(1)
1972–1973	AEL	1	(0)

International career
1964	Argentina	2	

Managerial career
- 1975–1976: AEL
- 1988: AEL
- 1995–1996: Niki Volos
- 1997: Lamia
- 2003: AEL
- * Club domestic league appearances and goals

Horacio Óscar Moráles (27 June 1943 – 26 February 2021) was an Argentine footballer who played as a defender. He competed in the men's tournament at the 1964 Summer Olympics. Morales was playing for Argentina during the Estadio Nacional disaster in 1964, which resulted in 328 deaths.
