= Héctor Ochoa =

Argentine footballer (1942–2020)

Héctor Osvaldo Ochoa
Personal information
- Date of birth: 5 July 1942
- Place of birth: Buenos Aires, Argentina
- Date of death: 20 May 2020 (aged 77)
- Place of death: Lincoln, Buenos Aires
- Position: Forward

Youth career
- El Linqueño

Senior career*
Years	Team	Apps	(Gls)
1962–1968	Atlanta		
1968–1969	Deportivo Morón		
1970	Deportivo Español		
1971	San Telmo		
- Sportivo Villegas
- Club Rivadavia

Managerial career
- Atlético Villegas
- * Club domestic league appearances and goals

Héctor Osvaldo Ochoa (5 July 1942 – 20 May 2020), nicknamed "Pochín", was an Argentine footballer who competed in the 1964 Summer Olympics.

Héctor Ochoa was born in the Parque Patricios neighborhood of Buenos Aires, but was brought up in Lincoln. He began his career at Atlanta in 1962. Playing for the national squad, he was present for the Estadio Nacional disaster in Lima, Peru, on 24 May 1964, in which some 300 spectators perished.

Ochoa died on 20 May 2020, aged 77.
