= Emilio Pazos =

Argentinian footballer (born 1945)

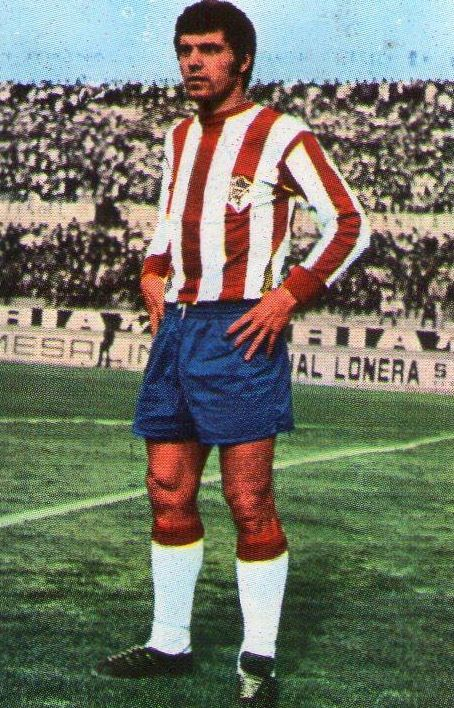
- Pazos in the 1969–70 season

Personal information
- Full name: Emilio Antonio Pazos Flores
- Date of birth: 24 July 1945 (age 81)
- Place of birth: Buenos Aires, Argentina
- Height: 1.70 m (5 ft 7 in)
- Position: Defender

Youth career
- 1964–1966: Atlanta

Senior career*
Years	Team	Apps	(Gls)
1966–1967	Atlanta	6	(0)
1967	Deportivo Español	21	(0)
1967–1972	Sevilla	149	(10)
1969–1970	→ Granada (loan)	18	(0)
1972–1979	Real Murcia	104	(5)

International career
1964	Argentina		
- * Club domestic league appearances and goals

Emilio Antonio Pazos Flores (born 24 July 1945) is a retired Argentine footballer. Nicknamed "Tito", he played as a defender for Sevilla and Real Murcia throughout the 1970s. He also represented his home country of Argentina internationally for the 1964 Summer Olympics.

== Club career ==
Pazos began his senior career by playing for Atlanta in 1966. Despite playing in the entirety of the 1966 season and first half of the 1967 season, he only made six appearances in his entire career for los Bohemios. He was then transferred to play for Deportivo Español in the middle of 1967 where he found more consistent success, making 21 appearances. His successes attracted the attention of Sevilla which would sign him for the 1967–68 season where the club went on dire times following relegation from the top-flight of Spanish football. Despite not appearing as a starting player, he still made a decent amount of appearances to where he contributed to the club achieve its promotion back to La Liga in the 1968–69 season. Despite this, he was loaned out to Granada which was also in La Liga for the 1969–70 season He continued playing for the Nervionenses until the 1971–72 season. In total, he made 149 appearances for the club and scored 10 goals.

Following this setback, Pazos played for Real Murcia beginning in the 1973–74 season in the 1973–74 La Liga following attracting the attention of club manager Felipe Mesones. Throughout his career with the Pimentoneros, he played in all divisions of Spanish football from La Liga to the Tercera División. He particularly found great success in the 1976–77 season as despite the club being relegated two times consecutively, the team had enough talent to emerge out of the Tercera División and escape the Segunda División B for direct promotion for the 1977–78 Segunda División. He continued until the 1978–79 season where he chose to retire.

== International career ==
Pazos represented Argentina for the 1964 Summer Olympics held in Tokyo as a reserve player.

== Personal life ==
During his career with Real Murcia, he would meet his wife in Murcia as the two later had a daughter and a son.
