= Otto Sesana =

Argentine footballer

- 1968

Personal information
- Date of birth: 16 July 1943 (age 83)
- Position: Defender

Senior career*
Years	Team	Apps	(Gls)
- Rosario Central
- * Club domestic league appearances and goals

Otto Sesana (16 July 1943 - 25 January 2017) is an Argentine former footballer who competed in the 1964 Summer Olympics.
