= Cotton Factory Club =

Association football club in Ethiopia

Cotton FC
- Full name: Cotton Factory Club
- Founded: 1936; 89 years ago
- Dissolved: 2000; 25 years ago
- Ground: Dire Dawa Stadium; Dire Dawa, Ethiopia
- Capacity: 18,000
Home colours

Cotton Factory Club was an Ethiopian football club based in Dire Dawa. They were a member of the Ethiopian Football Federation national league. Their home stadium was Dire Dawa Stadium. In 1960, 1962, 1963, 1965 and 1983 the team won the Ethiopian Premier League.

== History ==
The team was founded in 1936 and dissolved in 2000 after its relegation from the 1st division in the 1999–2000 football season.

== Honours ==
- Ethiopian Premier League: 5

Champion: 1960, 1962, 1963, 1965, 1983

== Performance in Caf competitions ==
- African Cup of Champions Clubs: 1 appearance

1964 – Semi-final
