= Edward Acquah =

Ghanaian footballer (1935–2011)

Personal information
- Full name: Edward Kobina Acquah
- Date of birth: 23 July 1935
- Date of death: 5 October 2011 (aged 76)
- Place of death: Takoradi, Ghana
- Position: Forward

Senior career*
Years	Team	Apps	(Gls)
1956–1962	Eleven Wise		
1962–1965	Real Republicans		

International career
1956–1964	Ghana	41	(45)
- * Club domestic league appearances and goals

Edward Kobina Acquah (23 July 1935 – 5 October 2011) was a Ghanaian footballer who played as a forward. He competed for the Ghana national team at the 1964 Summer Olympics. He also scored four goals for Ghana in the 1963 African Cup of Nations.

== Club career ==
Edward started his playing career for Sekondi Eleven Wise F.C., following his father's footsteps. His father's name was Kojo Acquah and he was regarded as one finest strikers of his time. However, Edward did not start his career as a striker, instead, due to his tall stature, was deployed as a goalkeeper in his early years. He was summoned to play as a striker when their first choice keeper, betrayed Eleven Wise and went to play for another club. During this game, Edward scored 2 goals as Eleven Wise were victorious. He was also sometimes deployed as a right-winger on occasions, but he was never better than the great Baba Yara, therefore he stayed as a centre-forward.

In the 1959/1960 season, Eleven Wise unfortunately finished bottom of the league with only 6 points and 10 losses. Due to Ghana not having a second division at the time, Sekondi stayed up and in the succeeding season, did the unthinkable. Acquah led Eleven Wise to one of the most entertaining seasons throughout the history of Ghanaian football. Previous season's winners Asante Kotoko were looking to become the first team in the Ghana Premier League's history to win in it back-to-back years. However, Eleven Wise won the championship, bettering Asante Kotoko by just two points. The final game of the season, Eleven Wise were losing 1–0 to Hasacaas in the Sekondi derby, but in the 85th minute Eleven Wise won a penalty which Acquah converted with ease. All Eleven Wise had to do was wait, Asante Kotoko played their game later on in the day, against Cornerstones. Surprisingly, Asante Kotoko lost 2-0 and this meant that Eleven Wise were champions.

According to Ohene Djan, Ghana's former FA chairman and first Director of Sport, Acquah scored over 400 goals in his club career and also 166 goals in 77 games, internationally. The club statistics contain friendly games and the international statistics contain regional games and unofficial games, totalling to 566 goals in his career. This tally could increase further, through research in newspaper reports of the time. He may be in contention of being part of RSSSF's list of players with over 500 goals

== International career ==
Acquah was called up to the Gold Coast team on 16 December 1956 scoring a hat-trick on his debut against Sierra Leone, in a tight 4–3 victory in the Akewe Cup. Three months later, Ghana celebrated their independence from British colonial rule, thereby making this game Acquah's only appearance for the Gold Coast team.

The team carried on playing, but now as Ghana. On 19 August 1962 the Real Madrid squad that had won the European Cup 5 times consecutively visited Ghana for a game. The game was electrifying; at one point Ghana led 3–2, with Acquah scoring, but a blinding pass by Ferenc Puskas set up Yanko Daucik to score the equalising goal, with only minutes to go. Acquah played a further 40 official games for Ghana, scoring 42 goals since independence, before hanging up his international boots in 1964.

== Career statistics ==
=== International ===
Appearances and goals by national team and year
National team	Year	Apps	Goals
Ghana	1956	1	3
Ghana	1957	2	0
Ghana	1958	1	0
Ghana	1959	5	4
Ghana	1960	7	9
Ghana	1961	5	2
Ghana	1962	6	11
Ghana	1963	5	10
Ghana	1964	8	4
Total		41	45

List of international goals scored by Edward Acquah
No.	Date	Opponent	Result	Competition
1	16 December 1956	Sierra Leone	4–3	Akwei Cup
2	16 December 1956	Sierra Leone	4–3	Akwei Cup
3	16 December 1956	Sierra Leone	4–3	Akwei Cup
4	25 October 1959	Nigeria	4–1	Ol. Qualifier
5	25 October 1959	Nigeria	4–1	Ol. Qualifier
6	6 December 1959	Egypt	2–0	Ol. Qualifier
7	6 December 1959	Egypt	2–0	Ol. Qualifier
8	7 February 1960	Sierra Leone	6–2	Kwame Nkrumah
9	7 February 1960	Sierra Leone	6–2	Kwame Nkrumah
10	3 July 1960	Egypt	2–2	Friendly
11	28 August 1960	Nigeria	4–1	WC Qualifier
12	10 September 1960	Nigeria	2–2	WC Qualifier
13	10 September 1960	Nigeria	2–2	WC Qualifier
14	2 October 1960	Mali	4–1	Kwame Nkrumah
15	2 October 1960	Mali	4–1	Kwame Nkrumah
16	7 October 1960	Nigeria	3–0	Kwame Nkrumah
17	7 October 1960	Nigeria	3–0	Kwame Nkrumah
18	5 March 1961	Mali	3–0	Friendly
19	30 April 1961	Nigeria	2–2	African Cup Qualifiers
20	17 December 1961	Nigeria	5–1	Azikiwe Cup
21	17 December 1961	Nigeria	5–1	Azikiwe Cup
22	17 December 1961	Nigeria	5–1	Azikiwe Cup
23	29 September 1962	Kenya	6–2	Uhuru Cup
24	29 September 1962	Kenya	6–2	Uhuru Cup
25	10 October 1962	Uganda	4–1	Uhuru Cup
26	12 October 1962	Kenya	4–0	Friendly
27	12 October 1962	Kenya	4–0	Friendly
28	12 October 1962	Kenya	4–0	Friendly
29	15 October 1962	Malawi	12–0	Friendly
30	15 October 1962	Malawi	12–0	Friendly
31	15 October 1962	Malawi	12–0	Friendly
32	15 October 1962	Malawi	12–0	Friendly
33	18 October 1962	Tanzania	6–2	Friendly
34	24 February 1963	Nigeria	5–0	Kwame Nkrumah Cup
35	3 March 1963	Mali	4–0	Kwame Nkrumah Cup
36	3 March 1963	Mali	4–0	Kwame Nkrumah Cup
37	3 March 1963	Mali	4–0	Kwame Nkrumah Cup
38	26 November 1963	Ethiopia	2–0	African Nations Cup
39	26 November 1963	Ethiopia	2–0	African Nations Cup
40	1 December 1963	Sudan	3–0	African Nations Cup
41	1 December 1963	Sudan	3–0	African Nations Cup
42	18 January 1964	Liberia	5–4	Olympic Qualifiers
43	18 January 1964	Liberia	5–4	Olympic Qualifiers
44	21 June 1964	Tunisia	1–2	Olympic Qualifiers
45	12 October 1964	Argentina	1–1	Olympics

== Honours ==
=== Club ===
- Ghana Premier League: 1961, 1963
- Ghana FA Cup: 1963, 1964, 1965

=== International ===
- AFCON: 1963
- Nkrumah Cup: 1959, 1960, 1963
- 1962 Ugandan Independence Tournament: 1962

== See also ==
- Football at the 1964 Summer Olympics
