= Nii Dodoo Ankrah =

Ghanaian footballer

Personal information
- Full name: Alhaji Adam Nii Dodoo Ankrah
- Date of birth: 8 March 1934 (age 92)
- Position: Goalkeeper

International career
Years	Team	Apps	(Gls)
- Ghana

Alhaji Adam Nii Dodoo Ankrah (also Edward Dodoo-Ankrah) (born 8 March 1934) is a Ghanaian former footballer. He competed in the men's tournament at the 1964 Summer Olympics.

== Club career ==
=== Real Republicans F.C (Ghana) ===
Ankrah played for the Ghanaian club and won the FA Cup for three consecutive seasons: 1961-62, 1962–63, and 1963–64. This was short-lived as the club was dissolved after the founder of the club Kwame Nkrumah was overthrown in 1966.

== International career ==
Mr Ankrah made his debut in the Ghana Black Stars senior men's football team of Ghana in 1957. The team won the following trophies:

- Jalco Cup: 1957
- West African Game (Kwame Nkrumah Gold Cup): 1960
- Uhuru cup: 1962
- African Cup of Nations: 1963
- West African Cup of Nations: 1963
- African Cup of Nations: 1965

== Awards ==
- Footballer of the Year: 1960

After a successful football campaign at the West African Game (Kwame Nkrumah Gold Cup), he won the Ghana Footballer of the Year.

- Dansoman Keep Fit Club Certificate of Honor: 1993
- SWAG Certificate of Honour: 1998
- Plaques of Honour for winning the 1963 & 1965 AFRICAN CUP OF NATIONS: 2000
- Lifetime Achievement Award - 2022

Nii Dodoo Ankrah also known as 'Magic Hands' received this special award from the Sports Writers Association of Ghana (SWAG) at its 47th annual awards.
