= Sam Acquah =

Ghanaian footballer (1943–c. 2014)

Personal information
- Full name: Samuel Acquah
- Nationality: Ghanaian
- Born: 10 July 1943
- Died: c. 2014
- Height: 1.78 m (5 ft 10 in)
- Weight: 72 kg (159 lb)

Sport
- Sport: Football

Samuel Acquah (10 July 1943 – c. 2014) was a Ghanaian footballer. He competed in the 1964 Summer Olympics. He played in the United States for the Detroit Cougars.
