= Joseph Agyemang-Gyau =

Ghanaian footballer (1939–2015)

Joseph Agyeman-Gyau
Personal information
- Full name: Joseph Agyeman-Gyau
- Date of birth: 3 June 1939
- Place of birth: Sunyani, Ghana
- Date of death: 14 May 2015 (aged 75)
- Positions: Winger; midfielder

Senior career*
Years	Team	Apps	(Gls)
- Real Republicans
- B/A United
1968	Washington Whips	15	(4)
1969–1970	Washington Darts	19	(5)
1972–1973	Baltimore Bays		
1974	Washington Diplomats	7	(1)

International career
1960–1968	Ghana		
- * Club domestic league appearances and goals

Joseph Agyemang-Gyau (3 June 1939 – 14 May 2015), also known as Agyemang Gyau or Nana Gyau, was a former Ghanaian international football player and traditional ruler.

== Club career ==
Agyeman-Gyau started his career as an amateur in his home country playing for Real Republicans and then B/A United. In 1968, he moved to the United States to play football professionally, and played for Washington Whips in the inaugural North American Soccer League season, scoring four goals in 15 games for the club. After the dissolution of the Whips at the end of the season, he joined Washington Darts, where he won the American Soccer League title in 1969. The Darts joined the NASL for the following season, and Agyeman-Gyau appeared 19 times, scoring five goals. He went on to play another two seasons in the ASL with Baltimore Bays before joining his third NASL club Washington Diplomats in 1974, playing seven league games and scoring one goal.

== International career ==
Agyeman-Gyau began representing Ghana in 1960, and went on to win two African Cup of Nations titles with the team in 1963 and 1965. He also represented the team in the 1964 Summer Olympics, scoring in a 3–2 win against Japan before Ghana were eliminated in the quarter-finals of the tournament. He continued to play for Ghana until 1968 when he moved to the United States.

== Personal life ==
Agyeman-Gyau was married to his wife for 50 years, Mary. He was the father of four children; Christiana, Emmanuel, Amy and Philip Gyau. He was also a grandfather of 7 which includes Joe Gyau who followed in his father's and grandfather's footsteps as a professional soccer player. He later returned to Ghana, where he was appointed as a traditional ruler, becoming the Atipimhene of Berekum. He died on 14 May 2015.
