= Baba Yara =

Ghanaian footballer

Personal information
- Full name: Osman Seidu
- Date of birth: 12 October 1936
- Place of birth: Kumasi, Ghana
- Date of death: 5 May 1969 (aged 32)
- Place of death: Accra, Ghana
- Position: Winger

Senior career*
| Years | Team | Apps | (Gls) |
| 1954-1961 | Asante Kotoko | | |
| 1961-1963 | Real Republicans | | |

International career
| 1955–1963 | Ghana | 49 | (51) |
- * Club domestic league appearances and goals

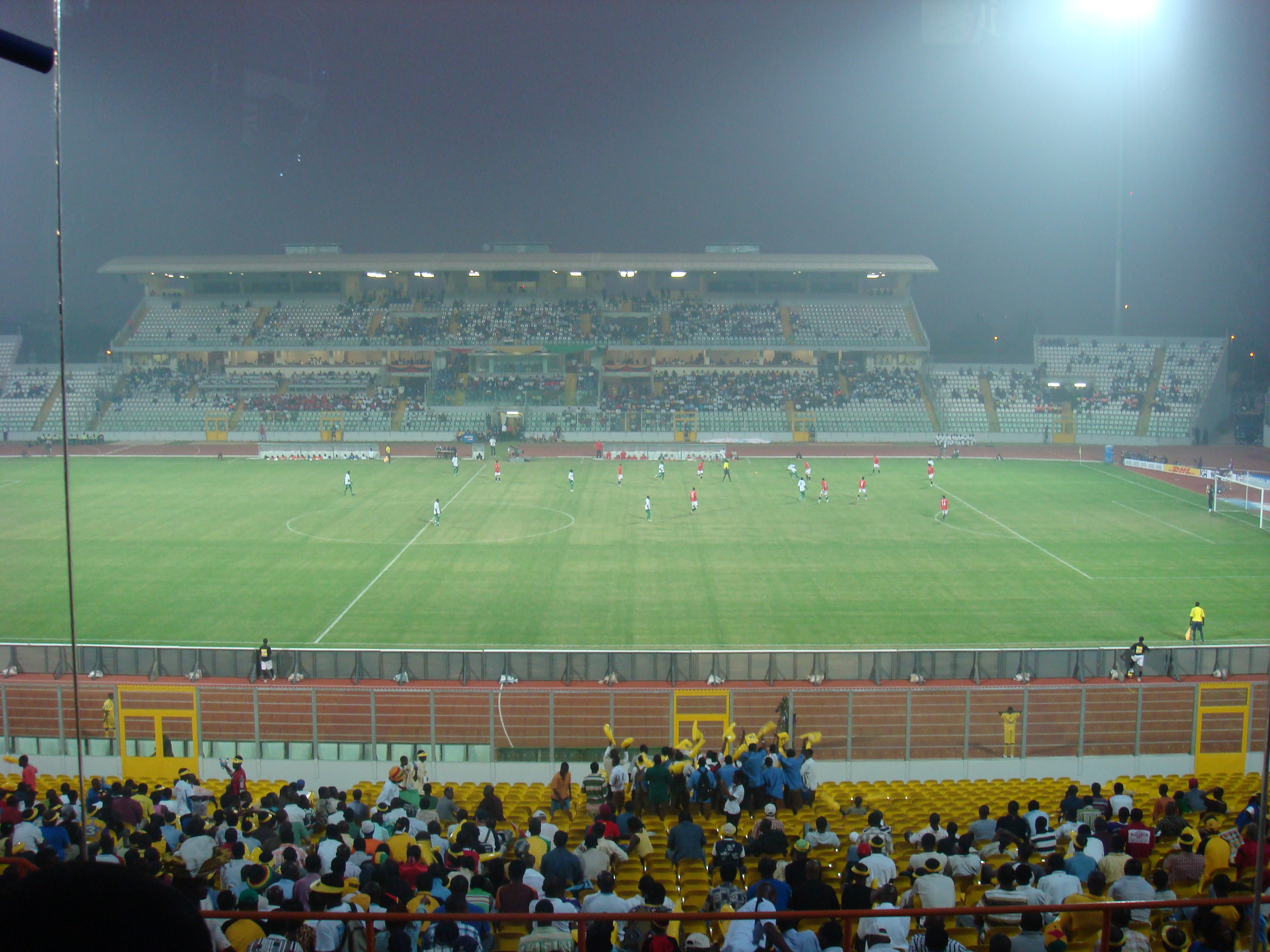
Baba Yara Sports Stadium in Kumasi

Baba Yara (real name Osman Seidu) was a Ghanaian international football player. He was popularly known as the ''King of Wingers''.

== Early life ==
Baba Yara was originally named Osman Seidu Maada, after his father, Seidu Maada, and his uncle, who was named Osman. However, due to him having the same name as his father, his mother called him "Baba", meaning father. One day, upon striking the ball hard against a wall, behind which his mother sat, she exclaimed, “Ei, Baba Yara!”, therefore, his nickname stuck with him forever. He started his career as a horse jockey player as a youngster at the Accra Turf Club from 1950 to 1955.

== Club career ==
=== Asante Kotoko ===
He was a former player of Kumasi Asante Kotoko in Ghana. He was signed by Asante Kotoko in 1955. Three month later in March 1955, he made his debut in a match against Dunkwa Town IX. The final score was 3–3 and Yara had managed to score all three of Asante Kotoko's goals. His third match was against the Hearts of Oak of Accra, one of the best teams across Ghana. It was during this match that for the first time, Yara played right-winger adorning the number 7 shirt. The end result was 0–0, but his game was still excellent, meaning that Asante Kotoko would go on a long run of great performances against their arch-rivals Hearts of Oak.

For two years running, Baba Yara was handed the then unofficial, Ghana Player of the Year award, in 1959 and in 1960.

=== Real Republicans ===
In the early 1960s, President Nkrumah asked the powerful Ghanaian sports chief, Ohene Djan, to build a team with some of the best players from all clubs in the country, to help the senior national team dominate African football. As predicted, the Real Republicans proved to be a practically unbeatable team, also reaping successes at the continental level. During this time, Yara would team-up with one of the greatest African goalscorers of all-time, in Edward Acquah. Both would link-up well during most games and Yara was the main man supplying Acquah with the majority of his goals. However, it was while playing for the Republicans, that a car accident suddenly ended the supreme rise of Baba Yara, just as he was at the peak of his career, forcing him to retire at the age of only 26.

He made his debut as a player for the Black Stars in 1955. In 1961 he won the award for Most Distinguished Member of the Black Stars team, regarded as the highest Ghanaian football honor of the time. He was part of Ghana National team that won African Cup of Nations in 1963. He played for Ghana in their unsuccessful 1962 FIFA World Cup qualification campaign. He is regarded as one of the best Ghanaian wingers of all time.

At the age of 26, he was injured in a motor collision at Kpeve in the Volta region while travelling back to Accra with his team, Real Republicans. His team played against Volta Heroes of Kpandu and won on 24 March 1963. He suffered a spinal injury and was paralysed and never played again.

He was flown to England accompanied by a surgical specialist from 37 Military Hospital by the name Dr. R. O. Addae where he was to be treated at Stoke Mandeville Hospital for spinal injuries. Reports received from the hospital stated there was likely Yara will gain recovery within a period of 4–6 months. It did not happen and he returned home on 14 August 1963 in a wheelchair. He died on 5 May 1969 at Korle-Bu Teaching Hospital.

In 2005, the Baba Yara Stadium was named in his honour.

== Honours ==
Footballer of the Year

Distinguished Member of the Black Star Group: 1961
