= Wilberforce Mfum =

Ghanaian footballer (1936–2025)

Personal information
- Date of birth: 28 August 1936
- Place of birth: Gold Coast
- Date of death: 11 May 2025 (aged 88)
- Place of death: Ghana
- Height: 5 ft 8 in (1.73 m)
- Position: Forward

Senior career*
Years	Team	Apps	(Gls)
1962–1967	Asante Kotoko		
1968	Baltimore Bays	5	(4)
1969–1970	Ukrainian SC		
1970	Ukrainian Nationals	9	(6)
1971–1972	New York Cosmos	15	(5)

International career
1960–1968	Ghana	26	(20)
- * Club domestic league appearances and goals

Wilberforce Mfum (28 August 1936 – 11 May 2025) was a Ghanaian professional footballer who played as a forward professionally in Ghana and the United States. He was a member of the Ghanaian Olympic soccer team at the 1964 Summer Olympics.

== Club career ==
Mfum played for Asante Kotoko in Ghana. In 1968, Mfum played for the Baltimore Bays of the National Professional Soccer League. In 1969, he joined Ukrainian SC of the German American Soccer League. In 1970, Mfum played for the Ukrainian Nationals of the American Soccer League. That season, he shared the ASL scoring title with Juan Paletta. In 1971, he signed with the New York Cosmos of the North American Soccer League.

== International career ==
Mfum played for the Ghana Olympic football team at the 1964 Summer Olympics. He also played for the Ghana national team. In 1963, he scored two goals in the final of the 1963 African Cup of Nations as Ghana took the title. He was the second leading scorer at the 1968 African Cup of Nations as Ghana finished runner-up.

== Death ==
Mfum died in Ghana on 11 May 2025, at the age of 88.

== Career statistics ==
Scores and results list Ghana's goal tally first, score column indicates score after each Mfum goal.

List of international goals scored by Wilberforce Mfum
No.	Date	Venue	Opponent	Score	Result	Competition
1	29 September 1962	Nakivubo Stadium, Kampala, Uganda	Kenya		6–3	1962 Ugandan Independence Tournament
2	10 October 1962	Nakivubo Stadium, Kampala, Uganda	Uganda		4–1	1962 Ugandan Independence Tournament
3	10 October 1962	Nakivubo Stadium, Kampala, Uganda	Uganda		4–1	1962 Ugandan Independence Tournament
4	15 October 1962	Kamuzu Stadium, Blantyre, Malawi	Nyasaland		12–0	Friendly
5	15 October 1962	Kamuzu Stadium, Blantyre, Malawi	Nyasaland		12–0	Friendly
6	15 October 1962	Kamuzu Stadium, Blantyre, Malawi	Nyasaland		12–0	Friendly
7	15 October 1962	Kamuzu Stadium, Blantyre, Malawi	Nyasaland		12–0	Friendly
8	15 October 1962	Kamuzu Stadium, Blantyre, Malawi	Nyasaland		12–0	Friendly
9	24 February 1963	Kumasi Sports Stadium, Kumasi, Ghana	Nigeria		5–0	Kwame Nkrumah Cup
10	24 February 1963	Kumasi Sports Stadium, Kumasi, Ghana	Nigeria		5–0	Kwame Nkrumah Cup
11	24 November 1963	Accra Sports Stadium, Accra, Ghana	Tunisia	1–0	1–1	1963 African Cup of Nations
12	23 February 1964	Accra Sports Stadium, Accra, Ghana	East Germany	1–0	3–0	Friendly
13	23 February 1964	Accra Sports Stadium, Accra, Ghana	East Germany	2–0	3–0	Friendly
14	31 May 1964	Accra Sports Stadium, Accra, Ghana	Tunisia	1–0	2–0	1964 Summer Olympics Qualifiers
15	18 October 1964	Omiya Park Soccer Stadium, Omiya, Japan	United Arab Republic		1–5	1964 Summer Olympics
16	12 January 1968	Cicero Stadium, Asmara, Ethiopia	Senegal	2–2	2–2	1968 African Cup of Nations
17	14 January 1968	Cicero Stadium, Asmara, Ethiopia	Congo-Kinshasa	2–1	2–1	1968 African Cup of Nations
18	16 January 1968	Cicero Stadium, Asmara, Ethiopia	Congo-Brazzaville		3–1	1968 African Cup of Nations
19	19 January 1968	Cicero Stadium, Asmara, Ethiopia	Ivory Coast		4–3	1968 African Cup of Nations
20	19 January 1968	Cicero Stadium, Asmara, Ethiopia	Ivory Coast		4–3	1968 African Cup of Nations
