= Kofi Pare =

Ghanaian footballer

Personal information
- Date of birth: 28 November 1938 (age 87)
- Position: Midfielder

Senior career*
Years	Team	Apps	(Gls)
? - 1961	Eleven Wise		
1961 - 1966	Real Republicans		

International career
1964–1970	Ghana		(15)
Medal record
Men's Football
Representing Ghana
Africa Cup of Nations
Winner	1963 Ghana
Winner	1965 Tunisia
- * Club domestic league appearances and goals

Kofi Pare (born 28 November 1938) is a Ghanaian former footballer. He competed in the men's tournament at the 1964 Summer Olympics.

Pare was one of the players selected to play for the elite Real Republicans football team in Ghana. He was a striker and was in the Ghana national football team squads that won the 1963 African Cup of Nations and the 1965 African Cup of Nations. He also played for Ghana during the 1964 Summer Olympics in Tokyo.
