= Edward Aggrey-Fynn =

Ghanaian footballer

Personal information
- Full name: Edward Jeff Aggrey-Fynn
- Date of birth: 24 November 1934
- Date of death: January 2005 (aged 70–71)
- Place of death: Cape Coast, Ghana
- Position: Midfielder

International career
Years	Team	Apps	(Gls)
- Ghana

Edward Aggrey-Fynn (24 November 1934 – January 2005) was a Ghanaian footballer. He competed in the men's tournament at the 1964 Summer Olympics.
