= Charles Gyamfi =

Ghanaian footballer

Personal information
- Full name: Charles Kumi Gyamfi
- Date of birth: 4 December 1929
- Place of birth: Accra, Ghana
- Date of death: 1 September 2015 (aged 85)
- Place of death: Accra, Ghana
- Height: 1.83 m (6 ft 0 in)
- Position: Midfielder

Senior career*
Years	Team	Apps	(Gls)
1948	Sailors		
1948–1949	Ebusua Dwarfs		
1949–1954	Asante Kotoko		
1954–1956	Kumasi Great Ashantis		
1956–1960	Hearts of Oak		
1960–1961	Fortuna Düsseldorf		

International career
1950–1961	Ghana		

Managerial career
- 1963–1965: Ghana
- 1972: Africa XI
- 1982: Ghana
- 1983–1984: Municipal Club
- 1984: Somalia U21
- 1988–1991: AFC Leopards
- 1992–1993: Ashanti Gold
Medal record
Men's football
Representing Ghana (as manager)
Africa Cup of Nations
Winner	1982
- * Club domestic league appearances and goals

Charles Kumi Gyamfi (4 December 1929 – 2 September 2015) was a Ghanaian footballer and coach, who as a player became the first African to play in Germany when he joined Fortuna Düsseldorf in 1960, and later became the first coach to lead the Ghana national football team to an Africa Cup of Nations victory.

Gyamfi had his primary school education at the Accra Royal School in James Town. As coach of the Ghana national football team, he won the African Cup of Nations three times (1963, 1965 and 1982), making him the most successful coach in the competition's history. This record has since been equalled by Egypt's Hassan Shehata.

Gyamfi was also the coach of the Ghana national football team during their Olympic debut at the 1964 Summer Olympics. He returned to coach the Olympic team for the 1972 tournament.

He was a member of FIFA's Technical Study Group for the 1999 and 2001 FIFA World Youth Championship.

In January 2008 he publicly lamented the modern obsession of players with money rather than the love of the game. He died in September 2015.
