= Charles Addo Odametey =

Ghanaian footballer

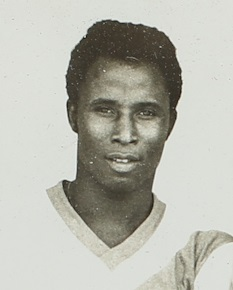

Personal information
- Date of birth: 23 February 1937
- Place of birth: Accra, Ghana
- Date of death: 29 December 2006
- Place of death: Accra, Ghana
- Position: Defender

Senior career*
Years	Team	Apps	(Gls)
- Accra Hearts of Oak

International career
1960-1968	Ghana	28	(2)
- * Club domestic league appearances and goals

Charles Addo Odametey (23 February 1937 – 29 December 2006) was a Ghanaian football player.

== Career ==
He played as a defender for Accra Hearts of Oak and was one of the original Black Stars, the Ghana national football team. He shares the record for the most appearances in a final of the African Nations Cup having played for the winning team in 1963 and 1965 (as captain) and in the 1968 final.

== International ==
He played for Ghana in the Olympic games of 1964 and 1968.
