= Real Republicans F.C. (Ghana) =

Football club based in Accra

Real Republikans was a Ghanaian association football club based in the capital, Accra, along with Hearts of Oak, and was among the most successful Ghanaian clubs in the country’s first decade of independence. It holds Ghana's record for the most consecutive FA Cup wins, four. The club formed the core of the national team, the Black Stars, in its early years.

== History ==
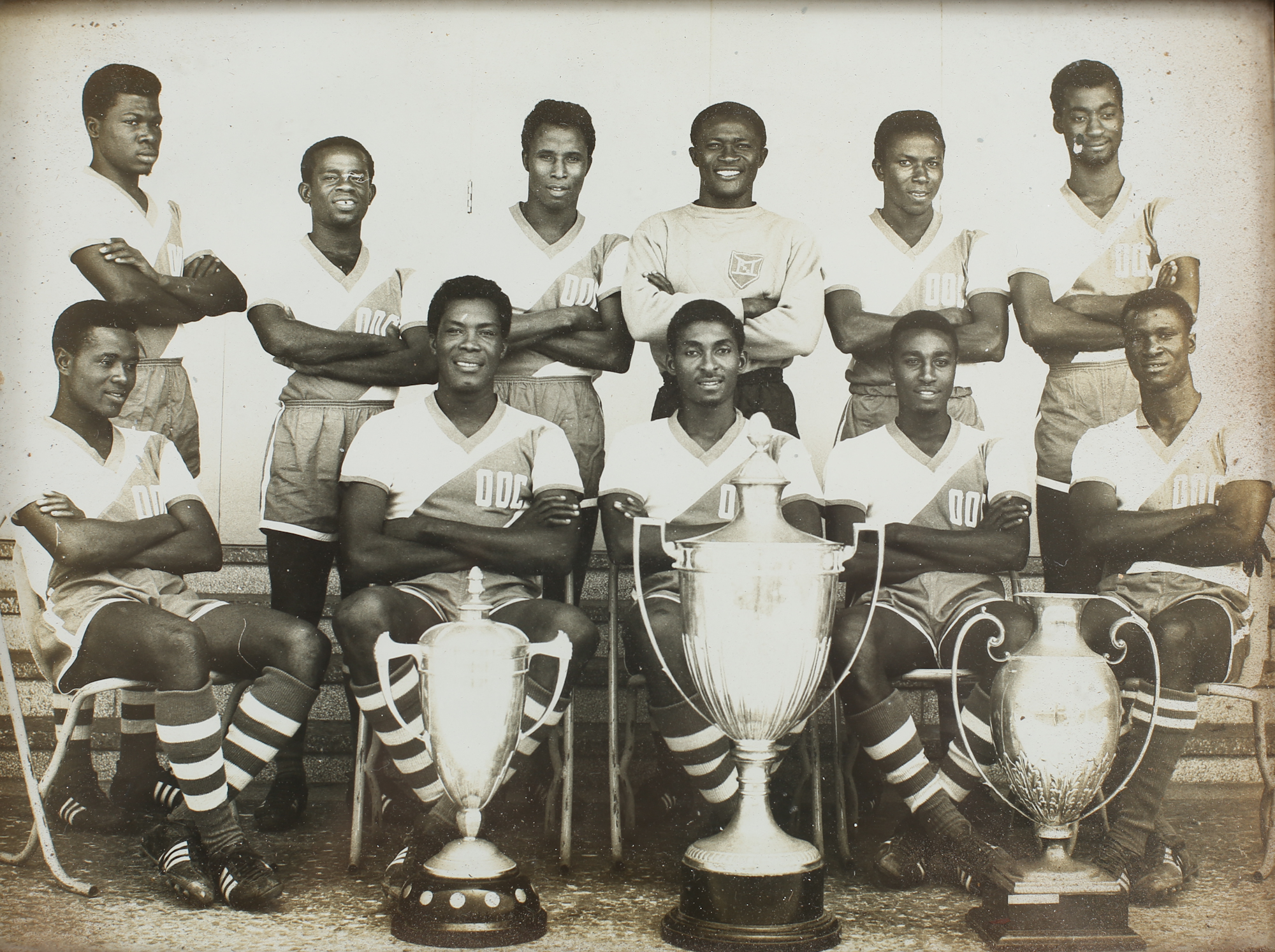
Real Republikans with domestic trophies FA Cup (center) and National League Cup (right) won during the 1962-1963 season

Kwame Nkrumah had an ambition to unite Africa and believed football could be used as a tool. He appointed Ohene Djan on 1 July 1960 as the Director of Sports. He encouraged Ohene Djan to form the football club which was also known as Osagyefo's Own Club. The passion and belief Nkrumah had in football led to the formation of the football club. It was claimed the team was made up of talented local boys who were assembled together. Notable among them was Baba Yara and Dogo Moro from Asante Kotoko, Addo Odametey and Doddo Ankrah from Hearts of Oak.

The team won its only Ghana Premier League title in the 1962/63 season. This remains the club's only title to date, as they were dissolved in 1966 at the height of their success. The team were more successful in the Ghanaian FA Cup than the league, winning four consecutive tournaments in the 1960s, which proved to be a great decade for the club. Republikan's last FA Cup win in 1965 was also their last participation in the tournament, as there was no FA Cup in 1966, the year the club dissolved. Real Republikans were once seen as a model club for the rest of Ghanaian football as they were established at a time when the first edition of a league system in Ghana resulted in chaos and ended with 6 of the 8 teams in the league boycotting in protest at the federation's leader. Edward Jonah Aggrey-Fynn, who was appointed captain of Real Republikans upon signing for the team in the late 1950s/early 1960s, went on to captain the Ghana national football team after showing great ability and leadership skills at club level. The club also found success in the CAF Champions League, reaching the semi-final of the competition in 1964/65. However, they were beaten 2–1 by opponents Oryx Douala from Cameroon on 31 January 1965 in front of 50,000 at the Accra Stadium and therefore did not reach the final. Oryx Douala went on to win the final against Stade Malien of Mali. Republikans had qualified for the tournament by winning their domestic league and then winning the "West Africa B" group consisting of league Champions from other countries.

== Games played ==
Real Republikans played against Real Madrid after they were invited by Kwame Nkrumah through Ohene Djan in Ghana. The game ended with a 3–3 draw at the Accra Sports Stadium. The game was played on 19 August.

They defeated Great Ashanti by 3 goals to nil in Kumasi to win the Ghana FA Cup.

== Accident ==
On 4 March 1963, the team had a motor accident which occurred at Kpeve, when they returning to Accra after playing a league match against Volta Heroes at Kpandu. Baba Yara who was claimed to be one of the glamorous footballer of all times in Ghana, got seriously injured which led to his career curtailed in his prime at the age of 26.

== Disbanded ==
The team was disbanded after President Kwame Nkrumah and his government were overthrown by coup d'état. The new military regime disbanded Real Republikans and Ghanaian football went into a relative period of decline.

== Ghanaian FA Cup Wins ==
Year	Opponent
1961/62	Hearts of Oak
1962/63	Cornerstones
1963/64	Great Ashantis
1965	Cornerstones
