= 1968 African Cup of Nations squads =

Below is a list of squads used in the 1968 African Cup of Nations.

== Group A ==
=== Algeria ===
Coach: (France) Lucien Leduc

No.	Pos.	Player	Date of birth (age)	Caps	Goals	Club
	GK	Mohamed Abrouk	30 November 1945 (aged 22)			(Algerian Football Federation) CR Belcourt
	GK	Abdelkrim Laribi	25 December 1943 (aged 24)			(Algerian Football Federation) JSM Tiaret
	DF	Ali Attoui	21 January 1942 (aged 25)			(Algerian Football Federation) USM Annaba
	DF	Boubekeur Belbekri (captain)	7 January 1942 (aged 26)			(Algerian Football Federation) USM Alger
	DF	Ahmed Bouden	4 December 1938 (aged 29)			(Algerian Football Federation) USM Annaba
	DF	Messaoud Belloucif	30 November 1940 (aged 27)			(Algerian Football Federation) AS Khroub
	DF	Lakhdar Bouyahi	21 January 1946 (aged 21)			(Algerian Football Federation) NA Hussein Dey
	DF	Kamel Lemoui	10 July 1939 (aged 28)			(Algerian Football Federation) CR Belcourt
	MF	Djilali Abdi	25 November 1943 (aged 24)			(Algerian Football Federation) USM Bel Abbès
	MF	Hacène Djemaâ	6 January 1942 (aged 26)			(Algerian Football Federation) CR Belcourt
	MF	Abdellah Kechra	31 January 1945 (aged 22)			(Algerian Football Federation) ASM Oran
	MF	Djilali Selmi	4 September 1946 (aged 21)			(Algerian Football Federation) CR Belcourt
	MF	Mustapha Seridi	18 April 1941 (aged 26)			(Algerian Football Federation) ES Guelma
	MF	Hacène Lalmas	12 March 1943 (aged 24)			(Algerian Football Federation) CR Belcourt
	FW	Boualem Amirouche	1 October 1942 (aged 25)			(Algerian Football Federation) RC Kouba
	FW	Kamel Beroudji	9 September 1945 (aged 22)			(Algerian Football Federation) OMR El Annasser
	FW	Achour Louahdi	14 March 1938 (aged 29)			(Algerian Football Federation) CR Belcourt
	FW	Noureddine Hachouf	10 May 1940 (aged 27)			(Algerian Football Federation) ES Guelma
	FW	Mokhtar Kalem	10 October 1944 (aged 23)			(Algerian Football Federation) CR Belcourt
	FW	Hamid Belabbes	16 July 1943 (aged 24)			(Algerian Football Federation) MC Oran

=== Ethiopia ===
Coach: (Hungary) Ferenc Szűcs

No.	Pos.	Player	Date of birth (age)	Caps	Goals	Club
	GK	Getachew "Dula" Abebe				(Ethiopian Football Federation) Saint George SC
	GK	Amde-Michael Gebre-Selassie				(Ethiopian Football Federation) EEPCO FC
	DF	Abraha Araya				(Ethiopian Football Federation) Embassoria
	DF	Wolde-Emanuel Fesseha				(Ethiopian Football Federation) Saint George SC
	DF	Bekure-Tsion Gebre-Hiwot				(Ethiopian Football Federation) Hamasien FC
	DF	Berhe Goitom				(Ethiopian Football Federation) EEPCO FC
	DF	Awad Mohammed				(Ethiopian Football Federation) Saint George SC
	MF	Luciano Vassallo (captain)	15 August 1935 (aged 32)			(Ethiopian Football Federation) Cotton Factory Club
	MF	Girma Asmerom	10 December 1949 (aged 18)			(Ethiopian Football Federation) Dagnew
	MF	Mengistu Worku	1 January 1940 (aged 28)			(Ethiopian Football Federation) Saint George SC
	MF	Kiflom Araya				(Ethiopian Football Federation) Ethiopian Airlines FC
	FW	Shewangizaw Agonafer				(Ethiopian Football Federation) Saint George SC
	FW	Getachew Wolde				(Ethiopian Football Federation) Cotton Factory Club
	FW	Abdulrahman Abdalla				(Ethiopian Football Federation) Hamasien FC
	MF	Haile Tesfa-Gabir				(Ethiopian Football Federation) Tele SC
	DF	Bereket Amde-Michael				(Ethiopian Football Federation) Hamasien FC
	MF	Tekeda Alemu				(Ethiopian Football Federation) Saint George SC
	DF	Getachew Gelashe				(Ethiopian Football Federation) Ethio-Cement
	FW	Haile-Abebe Wolde-Giorgis				(Ethiopian Football Federation) Mekuria
	DF	Eshetu Gebre-Hiwot				(Ethiopian Football Federation) Saint George SC
	MF	Getachew Abdo				(Ethiopian Football Federation) Saint George SC
	FW	Gebre-Medhin Tesfaye				(Ethiopian Football Federation) Tele SC

=== Ivory Coast ===
Coach: (France) Paul Gévaudan

No.	Pos.	Player	Date of birth (age)	Caps	Goals	Club
	GK	Jean Keita				(Ivorian Football Federation) ASEC Mimosas
	DF	Joseph Niankoury				(Ivorian Football Federation) Africa Sports
	MF	François Zady				(Ivorian Football Federation) Stade d'Abidjan
	DF	Henri Konan	1937			(Ivorian Football Federation) Stade d'Abidjan
	MF	Mathias Diagou				(Ivorian Football Federation) Stade d'Abidjan
	MF	Jean-Louis Bozon				(Ivorian Football Federation) Stella Club
	MF	Christophe Bazo				(Ivorian Football Federation) ASEC Mimosas
	DF	Séry Wawa	1943			(Ivorian Football Federation) Africa Sports
	DF	Yapobi				(Ivorian Football Federation)
	MF	Joseph Bléziri				(French Football Federation) SC Bastia
	FW	Eustache Manglé				(Ivorian Football Federation) ASEC Mimosas
	FW	François Tahi	28 May 1950 (aged 17)			(Ivorian Football Federation) Stade d'Abidjan
	FW	Laurent Pokou	10 August 1947 (aged 20)			(Ivorian Football Federation) ASEC Mimosas
	FW	Kouadio Dominique Yovan				(Ivorian Football Federation) ASEC Mimosas
	MF	Ernest Kallet Bialy	1943			(Ivorian Football Federation) Africa Sports
	FW	Maurice Déhi	1944			(Ivorian Football Federation) Stade d'Abidjan
	FW	Apollinaire N'Zi				(Ivorian Football Federation) Stella Club

=== Uganda ===
Coach: Robert Kiberu

No.	Pos.	Player	Date of birth (age)	Caps	Goals	Club
	GK	Joseph Masajjage				(Federation of Uganda Football Associations) Express FC
	GK	George Bukenya				(Federation of Uganda Football Associations) Coffee United
	DF	James Lukwago				(Federation of Uganda Football Associations) Express FC
	DF	Ibrahim Dafala	2 February 1935 (aged 32)			(Federation of Uganda Football Associations) Express FC
	DF	David Otti	1940			(Federation of Uganda Football Associations) Coffee United
	DF	Ben Ezaga				(Federation of Uganda Football Associations) Prisons FC
	MF	Steven Baraza				(Federation of Uganda Football Associations) Prisons FC
	MF	Parry Oketch (captain)				(Federation of Uganda Football Associations) Prisons FC
	MF	John Ddibya				(Federation of Uganda Football Associations) Army FC
	FW	Philip Polly Ouma				(Federation of Uganda Football Associations) Army FC
	FW	Swalleh Wasswa				(Federation of Uganda Football Associations) Army FC
	FW	Denis Obua	13 June 1947 (aged 20)			(Federation of Uganda Football Associations) Police FC
	MF	Kefa Lori				(Federation of Uganda Football Associations) Prisons FC
	MF	Peter Okee				(Federation of Uganda Football Associations) Prisons FC
	DF	Benjamin Ashe Mukasa				(Federation of Uganda Football Associations) Coffee United
	MF	Francis Kulabigwo				(Federation of Uganda Football Associations) Coffee United

== Group B ==
=== Congo-Brazzaville ===
Coach: (Republic of the Congo) Paul Ebondzibato

No.	Pos.	Player	Date of birth (age)	Caps	Goals	Club
	GK	Maxime "Yachine" Matsima	18 November 1940 (aged 27)			(Congolese Football Federation) Diables Noirs
	GK	Joseph "Lénine" Ngassaki	8 November 1941 (aged 26)			(Congolese Football Federation) CARA Brazzaville
	GK	Paul "Vieux Paul" Tandou	13 July 1947 (aged 20)			(Congolese Football Federation) Diables Noirs
	DF	Louis Akouala	1942			(Congolese Football Federation) Étoile du Congo
	DF	Adolphe "Amoyen" Bibandzoulou				(Congolese Football Federation) Diables Noirs
	DF	Serge-Samuel Boukaka	1942			(Congolese Football Federation) Étoile du Congo
	DF	Alphonse "Yaoundé" Niangou				(Congolese Football Federation) Standard de Brazzaville
	MF	Maurice "Fontaine" Ondzola				(Congolese Football Federation) Abeilles FC
	MF	Germain "Jadot" Dzabana	11 December 1944 (aged 23)			(Congolese Football Federation) Diables Noirs
	MF	Marcel "La Béte" Koko				(Congolese Football Federation) Étoile du Congo
	MF	Michel "Chine" Miéré				(Congolese Football Federation) Patronage Sainte-Anne
	FW	Emile Batoukeba				(Congolese Football Federation) Étoile du Congo
	FW	Jean-Chrysostome "Bistouri" Bikouri				(Congolese Football Federation) Diables Noirs
	FW	Jean-Bernard "Mulélé" Foundoux	16 October 1943 (aged 24)			(Congolese Football Federation) Patronage Sainte-Anne
	FW	Jean "Jeannot" Foutika				(Congolese Football Federation) CARA Brazzaville
	FW	Jean-Michel "Sorcier" M'Bono	27 January 1946 (aged 21)			(Congolese Football Federation) Étoile du Congo
	FW	Jean-Michel "Excellent" Ongagna	11 July 1945 (aged 22)			(Congolese Football Federation) Étoile du Congo
	MF	Maurice "Lipopo" Filankembo				(Congolese Football Federation) Patronage Sainte-Anne
	DF	Christophe Ombelle				(Congolese Football Federation) Patronage Sainte-Anne
	DF	François "Dolido" Poaty				(Congolese Football Federation) Vita Club Mokanda
	MF	Léon Tchikaya				(Congolese Football Federation) Étoile du Congo

=== Congo-Kinshasa ===
Coach: (Hungary) Ferenc Csanádi

No.	Pos.	Player	Date of birth (age)	Caps	Goals	Club
	GK	Robert Kazadi	6 March 1947 (aged 20)			(Congolese Association Football Federation) TP Englebert
	GK	Bernard Matumona				(Congolese Association Football Federation) FC Himalaya
	GK	Augustin "Souplesse" Ebengo				(Congolese Association Football Federation) CS Imana
	DF	Salomon "Général" Mange				(Congolese Association Football Federation) AS Vita Club
	DF	Elias Tshimanga				(Congolese Association Football Federation) US Kipushi
	DF	Pierre Katumba	1945			(Congolese Association Football Federation) TP Englebert
	DF	Albert Mwanza	17 December 1945 (aged 22)			(Congolese Association Football Federation) TP Englebert
	MF	Jean Kembo	27 December 1947 (aged 20)			(Congolese Association Football Federation) AS Vita Club
	MF	Raoul Kidumu	17 November 1946 (aged 21)			(Congolese Association Football Federation) Diables Rouges de Thysville
	MF	Joseph "Gento" Kibonge	12 February 1945 (aged 22)			(Congolese Association Football Federation) AS Vita Club
	FW	Pierre Kalala	22 November 1939 (aged 28)			(Congolese Association Football Federation) TP Englebert
	FW	Pierre Mwana Kasongo	10 October 1938 (aged 29)			(Congolese Association Football Federation) CS Imana
	FW	Léon Mungamuni	24 March 1947 (aged 20)			(Congolese Association Football Federation) FC Nomades
	DF	Albert Bilengi				(Congolese Association Football Federation)
	MF	Ignace "Pelé" Muwawa				(Congolese Association Football Federation) CS Imana
	MF	Nicodème Kabamba (captain)	29 July 1936 (aged 31)			(Congolese Association Football Federation) CS Imana
	MF	Ernest "Roi Saïo" Mokili	3 June 1945 (aged 22)			(Congolese Association Football Federation) AS Dragons
	DF	Paul Mbuli				(Congolese Association Football Federation) FC Himalaya
	FW	Albert Mwila				(Congolese Association Football Federation) AS Dragons
	MF	Emmanuel Ngenyibungi				(Congolese Association Football Federation) Union St-Gilloise
	FW	Philippe Mvukani				(Congolese Association Football Federation) AS Dragons
	FW	Freddy Mulongo	9 March 1939 (aged 28)			(Congolese Association Football Federation) CS Imana
	DF	Simon "Lemons" Lembi				(Congolese Association Football Federation) FC Mikado

=== Ghana ===
Coach: (Brazil) Carlos Alberto Parreira

No.	Pos.	Player	Date of birth (age)	Caps	Club
	GK	Jon Bortey Noawy	13 June 1939 (aged 28)		(Ghana) Great Olympics
	GK	Robert Mensah	12 June 1939 (aged 28)		(Ghana) Asante Kotoko
	GK	Emmanuel Anue Kofie	10 February 1941 (aged 26)		(Ghana) Asante Kotoko
	DF	Charles Addo Odametey (captain)	23 February 1937 (aged 30)		(Ghana) Hearts of Oak
	DF	Tetteh Bukey			(Ghana) Great Olympics
	DF	Franklin Crentsil			(Ghana) Real Republicans
	DF	John Eshun	17 July 1942 (aged 25)		(Ghana) Sekondi Hasaacas
	DF	Ben Kusi	1 June 1939 (aged 28)		(Ghana) Asante Kotoko
	MF	Oliver Acquah	22 March 1946 (aged 21)		(Ghana) Asante Kotoko
	MF	Edward Boye	1946		(Ghana) Great Olympics
	MF	Joseph Ghartey	27 June 1943 (aged 24)		(Ghana) Hearts of Oak
	MF	Osei Kofi	3 June 1940 (aged 27)		(Ghana) Asante Kotoko
	MF	Frank Odoi	23 February 1943 (aged 24)		(Ghana) Great Olympics
	MF	Ibrahim Sunday	22 July 1944 (aged 23)		(Ghana) Asante Kotoko
	MF	Joseph Wilson	2 December 1939 (aged 28)		(Ghana) Asante Kotoko
	FW	Robert Foley	16 October 1943 (aged 24)		(Ghana) Hearts of Oak
	FW	Amosa Gbadamosi	15 April 1942 (aged 25)		(Ghana) Hearts of Oak
	FW	Malik Jabir	8 December 1944 (aged 23)		(Ghana) Asante Kotoko
	FW	Cecil Jones Attuquayefio	18 October 1944 (aged 23)		(Ghana) Great Olympics
	FW	Wilberforce Mfum	28 August 1936 (aged 31)		(Ghana) Asante Kotoko
	FW	Sammy Sampene	18 December 1942 (aged 25)		(Ghana) Asante Kotoko

=== Senegal ===
Coach: Lamine Diack

No.	Pos.	Player	Date of birth (age)	Caps	Goals	Club
	GK	Amady Thiam				(Senegalese Football Federation) ASC Jeanne d'Arc
	GK	Toumani Diallo*				(Senegalese Football Federation) Foyer France Sénégal
	DF	Moustapha Dieng (captain)	9 April 1942 (aged 25)			(Senegalese Football Federation) ASC Jeanne d'Arc
	DF	Issa Mbaye				(Senegalese Football Federation) Foyer France Sénégal
	DF	Djibril Alioune "Petit" Guèye				(Senegalese Football Federation) Réveil de Saint-Louis
	DF	Yérim Diagne	1943			(Senegalese Football Federation) Réveil de Saint-Louis
	MF	Louis Camara	1946			(Senegalese Football Federation) Espoirs de Dakar
	MF	Louis Gomis Diop	25 May 1945 (aged 22)			(Senegalese Football Federation) Foyer France Sénégal
	MF	Abdoulaye Ndiaye				(Senegalese Football Federation)
	FW	Baye Moussé Paye				(Senegalese Football Federation) US Gorée
	FW	Yatma Diouck	4 July 1943 (aged 24)			(Senegalese Football Federation) Réveil de Saint-Louis
	FW	Mohamed "Doudou" Diongue	30 March 1946 (aged 21)			(Senegalese Football Federation) Espoirs de Dakar
	FW	Moustapha "Yatma" Diop	30 April 1943 (aged 24)			(French Football Federation) Amiens SC
	MF	Insa Diagne				(Senegalese Football Federation) Espoir de Saint-Louis

- Toumani Diallo was injured shortly before the tournament, and perhaps didn't travel with the squad.
