= DR Congo national football team results (1948–1971) =

List of national football team results

This article provides details of international football games played by the DR Congo national football team from before independence to 1971, at which point the Democratic Republic of the Congo was renamed Zaire.

== Pre-independence ==
| 1948 Friendly | Belgian Congo | 3–2 | Northern Rhodesia | Léopoldville, Belgian Congo |
| | ? (?); ? (?); ? (?) | | ? (?); ? (?) |

| 1948 Friendly | Belgian Congo | 2–3 | Northern Rhodesia | Léopoldville, Belgian Congo |
| | ? (?); ? (?) | | ? (?); ? (?); ? (?) |

| March 1950 Friendly | Northern Rhodesia | 1–0 | Belgian Congo | Lusaka, Northern Rhodesia |
| | ? (?) |

| March 1950 Friendly | Northern Rhodesia | 1–0 | Belgian Congo | Lusaka, Northern Rhodesia |
| | ? (?) |

| September 1953 1953 Jeux de l'Amitié Final | Belgian Congo | 3–2 | French Cameroon | Léopoldville, Belgian Congo |
| | ? (?); ? (?); ? (?) | | ? (?); ? (?) |

| 2 January 1956 Friendly | Belgian Congo | 2–4 | French Cameroon | Léopoldville, Belgian Congo |
| | ? (?); ? (?) | | ? (?); ? (?); ? (?); ? (?) |

== Post-independence ==
=== 1963 ===
| 12 April 1963 1963 Jeux de l'Amitié | Mauritania | 0–6 | Congo-Léopoldville | Dakar, Senegal |
| | | | ? (?); ? (?); ? (?); ? (?); ? (?); ? (?) |

| 13 April 1963 1963 Jeux de l'Amitié | Congo-Brazzaville | 2–1 | Congo-Léopoldville | Dakar, Senegal |
| | ? (?); ? (?) | | ? (?) |

| 15 April 1963 1963 Jeux de l'Amitié | Ivory Coast | 1–0 | Congo-Léopoldville | Dakar, Senegal |
| | ? (?) |

| 16 April 1963 1963 Jeux de l'Amitié | Tunisia | 0–1 | Congo-Léopoldville | Dakar, Senegal |
| | | | Kalala 10' |

=== 1964 ===
| 24 February 1964 Friendly | Congo-Léopoldville | 0–0 | Congo-Brazzaville | Léopoldville, Congo-Léopoldville |

| 22 April 1964 Friendly | Cameroon | 2–2 | Congo-Léopoldville | Yaoundé, Cameroon |
| | ? (?); ? (?) | | ? (?); ? (?) |

| 13 July 1964 1964 Coupe Tropiques | Congo-Léopoldville | 3–1 | Congo | Yaoundé, Cameroon |
| | ? (?); ? (?); ? (?) | | ? (?) |

| 19 July 1964 1964 Coupe Tropiques | Congo-Léopoldville | 1–2 | Cameroon | Yaoundé, Cameroon |
| | ? (?) | | ? (?); ? (?) |

=== 1965 ===
| 1965 Friendly | Ghana | 4–1 | DR Congo | Accra, Ghana |
| | ? (?); ? (?); ? (?); ? (?) | | ? (?) |

| 9 January 1965 Friendly | Togo | 0–3 | DR Congo | Lomé, Togo |
| | | | ? (?); ? (?); ? (?) |

| 17 January 1965 1965 CAN qualification | Ivory Coast | 2–0 | DR Congo | Abidjan, Ivory Coast |
| | Déhi 69'; Bléziri 80' |

| 1 February 1965 Friendly | DR Congo | 3–0 | Congo | Léopoldville, DR Congo |
| | ? (?); ? (?); ? (?) |

| 3 April 1965 1965 African Games qualification | DR Congo | 3–2 | Cameroon | Léopoldville, DR Congo |
| | ? (?); ? (?); ? (?) | | ? (?); ? (?) |

| 14 April 1965 1965 African Games qualification | DR Congo | 3–1 | Cameroon | Léopoldville, DR Congo |
| | ? (?); ? (?); ? (?) | | ? (?) |

| April 1965 1965 African Games qualification | DR Congo | 8–2 | Central African Republic | Léopoldville, DR Congo |
| | ? (?); ? (?); ? (?); ? (?); ? (?); ? (?); ? (?); ? (?) | | ? (?); ? (?) |

| 19 July 1965 1965 African Games group stage | Madagascar | 0–7 | DR Congo | Brazzaville, Republic of the Congo |
| | | | ? (?); ? (?); ? (?); ? (?); ? (?); ? (?); ? (?) | Attendance: 14,000 |

| 20 July 1965 1965 African Games group stage | Algeria | 4–1 | DR Congo | Brazzaville, Republic of the Congo |
| | Zefzef 18'; Hachouf 50', 67', 73' | | ? (?) | Attendance: 10,000 |

| 21 July 1965 1965 African Games group stage | Ivory Coast | 1–1 | DR Congo | Brazzaville, Republic of the Congo |
| | ? (?) | | ? (?) | Attendance: 12,000 |

| 25 July 1965 1965 African Games 5/8 semifinals | DR Congo | 5–1 | Togo | Brazzaville, Republic of the Congo |
| | ? (?); ? (?); ? (?); ? (?); ? (?) | | ? (?) | Attendance: 10,000 |

| 26 July 1965 1965 African Games 5th place match | DR Congo | 6–2 | Uganda | Brazzaville, Republic of the Congo |
| | ? (?); ? (?); ? (?); ? (?); ? (?); ? (?) | | ? (?); ? (?) | Attendance: 10,000 |

| 14 August 1965 1965 CAN qualification | Liberia | 2–1 | DR Congo | Monrovia, Liberia |
| | ? (?); ? (?) | | ? (?) |

| 5 September 1965 1965 CAN qualification | DR Congo | 4–2 | Ivory Coast | Léopoldville, DR Congo |
| | ? (?); ? (?); ? (?); ? (?) | | ? (?); ? (?) |

| 21 September 1965 1965 CAN qualification | DR Congo | 3–2 | Liberia | Léopoldville, DR Congo |
| | ? (?); ? (?); ? (?) | | ? (?); ? (?) |

| 12 November 1965 1965 CAN group stage | Ghana | 5–2 | DR Congo | Sousse, Tunisia |
| | Kofi 13'; Acheampong 18', 59'; Attuquayefio 84', 89' | | Kalala 43', 45' (pen.) | Stadium: Stade Municipal Bou Ali-Lahouar; Attendance: 4,000 |

| 14 November 1965 1965 CAN group stage | Ivory Coast | 3–0 | DR Congo | Sfax, Tunisia |
| | Manglé 14', 59', 80' | | | Stadium: Stade Taïeb Mhiri; Attendance: 6,000 |

=== 1966 ===
| 27 February 1966 Friendly | Niger | 2–1 | DR Congo | Niamey, Niger |
| | ? (?); ? (?) | | ? (?) |

| 30 June 1966 Friendly | DR Congo | 0–3 | Ghana | Kinshasa, DR Congo |
| | | | ? (?); ? (?); ? (?) |

| 7 August 1966 Friendly | DR Congo | 5–0 | Central African Republic | Kinshasa, DR Congo |
| | ? (?); ? (?); ? (?); ? (?); ? (?) |

| 5 November 1966 Friendly | Nigeria | 3–2 | DR Congo | Lagos, Nigeria |
| | ? (?); ? (?); ? (?) | | ? (?); ? (?) |

| 27 November 1966 Friendly | DR Congo | 1–0 | Nigeria | Kinshasa, DR Congo |
| | ? (?) |

| 2 December 1966 Friendly | Gabon | 3–4 | DR Congo | Bangui, Central African Republic |
| | ? (?); ? (?); ? (?) | | ? (?); ? (?); ? (?); ? (?) |

| 3 December 1966 Friendly | Central African Republic | 1–4 | DR Congo | Bangui, Central African Republic |
| | ? (?) | | ? (?); ? (?); ? (?); ? (?) |

=== 1967 ===
| 1967 Friendly | Liberia | 1–4 | DR Congo | Monrovia, Liberia |
| | ? (?) | | ? (?); ? (?); ? (?); ? (?) |

| 4 January 1967 Friendly | Gabon | 1–0 | DR Congo | Libreville, Gabon |
| | ? (?) |

| 22 January 1967 Friendly | DR Congo | 4–1 | Congo | Kinshasa, DR Congo |
| | ? (?); ? (?); ? (?); ? (?) | | ? (?) |

| February 1967 Friendly | Togo | 2–4 | DR Congo | Lomé, Togo |
| | ? (?); ? (?) | | ? (?); ? (?); ? (?); ? (?) |

| 24 February 1967 Friendly | Uganda | 0–5 | DR Congo | Kampala, Uganda |
| | | | ? (?); ? (?); ? (?); ? (?); ? (?) |

| 18 March 1967 1968 CAN qualification | DR Congo | 3–2 | Sudan | Kinshasa, DR Congo |
| | ? (?); ? (?) | | ? (?) |

| 25 March 1967 Friendly | Kenya | 5–4 | DR Congo | Nairobi, Kenya |
| | ? (?); ? (?); ? (?); ? (?); ? (?) | | ? (?); ? (?); ? (?); ? (?) |

| 26 March 1967 Friendly | Kenya | 1–1 | DR Congo | Nairobi, Kenya |
| | ? (?) | | ? (?) |

| 2 April 1967 1968 CAN qualification | Sudan | 1–0 | DR Congo | Khartoum, Sudan |
| | ? (?) |

| 19 April 1967 Friendly | Congo | 3–1 | DR Congo | Brazzaville, Republic of the Congo |
| | ? (?); ? (?); ? (?) | | ? (?) |

| 24 May 1967 Friendly | Ghana | 2–0 | DR Congo | Accra, Ghana |
| | ? (?); ? (?) |

| August 1968 Friendly | DR Congo | 2–2 | Mali | Kinshasa, DR Congo |
| | ? (?); ? (?) | | ? (?); ? (?) |

| August 1968 Friendly | DR Congo | 1–0 | Ethiopia | Kinshasa, DR Congo |
| | ? (?) |

| 13 August 1967 1968 CAN qualification | DR Congo | 2–1 | Sudan | Kampala, Uganda |
| | ? (?); ? (?) | | ? (?) |

| 1 September 1967 Friendly | DR Congo | 2–0 | Ghana | Kinshasa, DR Congo |
| | ? (?); ? (?) |

| 17 September 1967 1968 CAN qualification | DR Congo | 1–0 | Tanzania | Kinshasa, DR Congo |
| | ? (?) |

| 10 October 1967 1968 CAN qualification | Tanzania | 0–1 | DR Congo | Dar es Salaam, Tanzania |
| | | | ? (?) |

| 24 November 1967 Friendly | Dahomey | 2–5 | DR Congo | Porto-Novo, Dahomey |
| | ? (?); ? (?) | | ? (?); ? (?); ? (?); ? (?); ? (?) |

=== 1968 ===
| 12 January 1968 1968 CAN group stage | DR Congo | 3–0 | Congo | Asmara, Ethiopia |
| | Muwawa 19'; Kabamba 27' (pen.), 51' | | | Stadium: Cicero Stadium; Attendance: 4,000; Referee: Ahmed Khelifi (Algeria) |

| 14 January 1968 1968 CAN group stage | Ghana | 2–1 | DR Congo | Asmara, Ethiopia |
| | Kofi 17' (pen.); Mfum 84' | | Mokili 42' | Stadium: Cicero Stadium; Attendance: 3,000; Referee: Pierre Boua (Ivory Coast) |

| 16 January 1968 1968 CAN group stage | DR Congo | 2–1 | Senegal | Asmara, Ethiopia |
| | Mantantu (?); Tshimanga (?) | | Diouck (?) | Stadium: Cicero Stadium; Attendance: 3,000; Referee: Seyoum Tarekegn (Ethiopia) |

| 19 January 1968 1968 CAN semifinals | Ethiopia | 2–3 (a.e.t.) | DR Congo | Addis Ababa, Ethiopia |
| | Vassallo 25'; Worku 65' | | Mantantu 3'; Mungamuni 19', 100' | Stadium: Haile Selassie Stadium; Attendance: 25,000; Referee: Ali Kandil (Egypt) |

| 21 January 1968 1968 CAN Final | DR Congo | 1–0 | Ghana | Addis Ababa, Ethiopia |
| | Kalala 66' | | | Stadium: Haile Selassie Stadium; Attendance: 25,000; Referee: Ad-Diba (Egypt) |

| 7 March 1968 Friendly | Guinea | 1–0 | DR Congo | Conakry, Guinea |
| | ? (?) |

| 24 November 1968 Friendly | DR Congo | 1–0 | Tunisia | Kinshasa, DR Congo |
| | Mayanga 18' | | | Attendance: 50,000 |

=== 1969 ===
| 26 January 1969 Friendly | DR Congo | 4–0 | Senegal | Kinshasa, DR Congo |
| | ? (?); ? (?); ? (?); ? (?) |

| 30 January 1969 Friendly | DR Congo | 2–1 | Cameroon | Kinshasa, DR Congo |
| | ? (?); ? (?) | | ? (?) |

| 22 November 1969 Friendly | DR Congo | 10–1 | Zambia | Kinshasa, DR Congo |
| | ? (?); ? (?); ? (?); ? (?); ? (?); ? (?); ? (?); ? (?); ? (?); ? (?) | | ? (?) |

| 14 December 1969 Friendly | DR Congo | 5–0 | Nigeria | Kinshasa, DR Congo |
| | ? (?); ? (?); ? (?); ? (?); ? (?) |

=== 1970 ===
| 7 February 1970 1970 CAN group stage | Ghana | 2–0 | DR Congo | Wad Madani, Sudan |
| | Owusu 29', 32' | | | Stadium: Wad Madani Stadium; Attendance: 7,525; Referee: Ihrahim Obeid (Sudan) |

| 9 February 1970 1970 CAN group stage | DR Congo | 2–2 | Guinea | Wad Madani, Sudan |
| | Kalonzo 70'; Mungamuni 72' | | Sory 5'; Soumah 55' (pen.) | Stadium: Wad Madani Stadium; Attendance: 3,342; Referee: Théodore Koudou (Ivory Coast) |

| 11 February 1970 1970 CAN group stage | United Arab Republic | 1–0 | DR Congo | Wad Madani, Sudan |
| | | | | Stadium: Wad Madani Stadium; Attendance: 3,927; Referee: Bennett Simfukwe (Zimbabwe) |

| 27 June 1970 Friendly | Sudan | 3–0 | DR Congo | Khartoum, Sudan |
| | ? (?); ? (?); ? (?) |

| 8 November 1970 1972 CAN qualification | Uganda | 1–4 | DR Congo | Kampala, Uganda |
| | ? (?) | | ? (?); ? (?); ? (?); ? (?) |

| 24 November 1970 1972 CAN qualification | DR Congo | 1–0 | Uganda | Kinshasa, DR Congo |
| | ? (?) |

=== 1971 ===
| 10 January 1971 Friendly | Ghana | 1–1 | DR Congo | Kinshasa, DR Congo |
| | ? (?) | | ? (?) |

| 26 April 1971 Friendly | Tanzania | 0–1 | DR Congo | Dar es Salaam, Tanzania |
| | | | ? (?) |

| 6 June 1971 1972 CAN qualification | Zambia | 2–1 | DR Congo | Ndola, Zambia |
| | Stephenson 15'; M'hango 45+1' | | Etepé 16' | Stadium: Dag Hammarskjöld Stadium; Attendance: 30,000 |

| 20 June 1971 1972 CAN qualification | DR Congo | 3–0 | Zambia | Kinshasa, DR Congo |
| | Kembo (?) | | | Stadium: 40,000 |
