= 1968 African Cup of Nations qualification =

Football tournament

This page details the process of qualifying for the 1968 African Cup of Nations.

== Qualified teams ==
- Algeria
- Congo-Brazzaville
- Congo-Kinshasa
- Ethiopia (hosts)
- Ghana (holders)
- Ivory Coast
- Senegal
- Uganda

== Group stage ==
=== Group 1 ===
Team	Pld	W	D	L	GF	GA	GD	Pts
Senegal	4	2	1	1	9	6	+3	5
Guinea	4	2	1	1	9	6	+3	5
Liberia	4	0	2	2	4	10	−6	2

Note: different fixture dates depending on the sources.

26 January 1967

Liberia	2–2	Guinea

Antoinette Tubman Stadium, Monrovia

25 February 1967

Guinea	3–0	Senegal
Kandia; Souleymane ?

Stade du 28 Septembre, Conakry

19 March 1967

Senegal	4–1	Guinea
Goal		Kandia

Stade Demba Diop, Dakar

2 April 1967

Guinea	3–0	Liberia
Kandia ? ?

Stade du 28 Septembre, Conakry

9 April 1967

Liberia	1–1	Senegal

Antoinette Tubman Stadium, Monrovia

2 July 1967

Senegal	4–1	Liberia
Gomis; Petit Guèye; Thioye; Paye (pen.)		Goal

Stade Demba Diop, Dakar

Playoff

22 October 1967

Senegal	2–1	Guinea
Gomis; Sarr		Souleymane

Stade Demba Diop, Dakar

=== Group 2 ===
Team	Pld	W	D	L	GF	GA	GD	Pts
Algeria	4	4	0	0	9	2	+7	8
Mali	4	2	0	2	5	4	+1	4
Upper Volta	4	0	0	4	2	10	−8	0

5 February 1967

Mali	0–3	Algeria
		Achour 23'; Lalmas 36'; Kalem 87'

Stade Municipal, Bamako
Referee: Jean-Louis Faber (Guinea)

12 February 1967

Upper Volta	1–2	Algeria
Ouattara 34'		Seridi 40'; Lalmas 76'

Stade Municipal, Ouagadougou
Referee: ... (Ivory Coast)

12 March 1967

Algeria	1–0	Mali
Hachouf 31'

19 June Stadium, Oran

9 April 1967

Algeria	3–1	Upper Volta
Bouyahi 35'; Abdi 48'; Bourouba 73'		Ouédraogo 68'

20 August Stadium, Algiers
Referee: Moustapha N'Gom (Senegal)

27 September 1967

Mali	4–0	Upper Volta
Mara 38', 45'; Sinaté 48'; S. Keïta

Stade Municipal, Bamako

15 November 1967

Upper Volta	0–1	Mali
		Diallo

Stade Municipal, Ouagadougou

=== Group 3 ===
Team	Pld	W	D	L	GF	GA	GD	Pts
Ivory Coast	4	3	1	0	7	0	+7	7
Nigeria	4	1	1	2	4	5	−1	3
Togo	4	1	0	3	3	9	−6	2

12 March 1967

Nigeria	0–0	Ivory Coast

Lagos

2 April 1967

Togo	1–0	Nigeria

Lomé

15 April 1967

Nigeria	4–2	Togo
Bassey 15'; Shittu 30'; Olowo-Oshodi 43'; Bankole 70'		Goal

Lagos

30 April 1967

Ivory Coast	3–0	Togo

Stade Félix Houphouët-Boigny, Abidjan

7 May 1967

Ivory Coast	2–0	Nigeria

Stade Félix Houphouët-Boigny, Abidjan

16 August 1967

Togo	0–2	Ivory Coast

Lomé

=== Group 4 ===
==== First round ====
Team 1	Agg.	Team 2	1st leg	2nd leg
Libya	4–5	United Arab Republic	2–2	2–3
Uganda	5–4	Kenya	2–1	3–3

9 December 1966

Libya	2–2	United Arab Republic
Ben Soed 61' (pen.), ?'		Reyadh 14'; Emam 66'

Municipal Stadium, Tripoli
Referee: Ahmed Kandil (Sudan)
24 March 1967

United Arab Republic	3–2	Libya
Bakr 63'; Reyadh 68'; El-Fanagily 74'		Ben Soed 14', ?'

Nasser Stadium, Cairo
Referee: Seyoum Tarekegn (Ethiopia)

5 March 1967

Uganda	2–1	Kenya
Oketch 6'; Dibya 13'		Yongo 21'

Nakivubo Stadium, Kampala
12 March 1967

Kenya	3–3	Uganda
Nyawanga 20'; Madegwa 28', 82'		Ouma 11'; Oundo 22' (pen.); Obua 61'

Nairobi City Stadium, Nairobi

==== Second round ====
Team 1	Agg.	Team 2	1st leg	2nd leg
Uganda	w/o	United Arab Republic	0–1	—

4 June 1967

Uganda	0–1	United Arab Republic
		Bakr 19'

Nakivubo Stadium, Kampala
30 June 1967

United Arab Republic	Cancelled	Uganda
Withdrew

Cairo

United Arab Republic withdrew due to the Six-Day War with Israel, which began on 5 June 1967. Uganda qualified.

=== Group 5 ===
Team	Pld	W	D	L	GF	GA	GD	Pts
Congo-Brazzaville	4	2	2	0	6	3	+3	6
Tunisia	4	1	1	2	5	5	0	3
Cameroon	4	1	1	2	4	7	−3	3

5 February 1967

Tunisia	4–0	Cameroon
Machouche 35'; Chaïbi 36'; H. Akid 38', 51'

Stade Chedly Zouiten, Tunis

19 February 1967

Tunisia	1–1	Congo-Brazzaville
Habacha 80'		Dzabana 1'

Stade Chedly Zouiten, Tunis

26 February 1967

Cameroon	1–1	Congo-Brazzaville
		Batoukéba

Yaoundé

21 May 1967

Congo-Brazzaville	2–1	Cameroon
Foundoux; Ongagna		Mbappé 70'

Stade Alphonse Massemba-Débat, Brazzaville

16 August 1967

Cameroon	2–0 (Awarded)	Tunisia
		Withdrew

Yaoundé

Congo-Brazzaville	2–0 (Awarded)	Tunisia
		Withdrew

Stade Alphonse Massemba-Débat, Brazzaville

=== Group 6 ===
==== First round ====
Team 1	Agg.	Team 2	1st leg	2nd leg	3rd leg
Congo-Kinshasa	5–4	Sudan	3–2	0–1	2–1
Tanzania	2–1	Mauritius	1–0	1–1	

18 March 1967

Congo-Kinshasa	3–2	Sudan

Stade Tata Raphaël, Kinshasa
2 April 1967

Sudan	1–0	Congo-Kinshasa

Municipal Stadium, Khartoum

Playoff

13 August 1967

Congo-Kinshasa	2–1	Sudan

Nakivubo Stadium, Kampala

2 August 1967

Tanzania	1–0	Mauritius

National Stadium, Dar es Salaam
16 August 1967

Mauritius	1–1	Tanzania

Stade George V, Curepipe

==== Second round ====
Team 1	Agg.	Team 2	1st leg	2nd leg
Congo-Kinshasa	2–0	Tanzania	1–0	1–0

17 September 1967

Congo-Kinshasa	1–0	Tanzania

Stade Tata Raphaël, Kinshasa
10 October 1967

Tanzania	0–1	Congo-Kinshasa

National Stadium, Dar es Salaam
