= Djilali =

Djilali is both a masculine given name and a surname. A variant is Djillali. Notable people with the name include:

== Surname ==
- Alexia Djilali (born 1987), French volleyballer
- Kieran Djilali (born 1991), English footballer
- Nadjiba Djilali, Algerian politician
- Nedjib (Ned) Djilali (born 1953), Canadian engineering professor of Algerian descent
- Soufiane Djilali,Algerian politician

== Given name ==
- Djilali Abdi (1943–2022), Algerian footballer
- Djilali Bedrani (born 1993), French runner
- Djilali Mehri (born 1937), Algerian businessman
- Djilali Selmi (1946–2025), Algerian footballer

== See also ==
- Sidi Djillali, a town and commune in north-western Algeria
