= Freddy Mulongo =

Congolese journalist (born 1965)

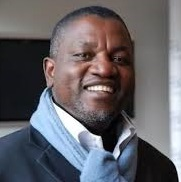

Freddy Mulongo (born 6 September 1965 in Lubumbashi in the province of Katanga) is a Congolese journalist living in France and is noted as one of the great defenders of associative and community radios in the Congo. Freddy is also co-organizer, along with his colleague Roger Bongos, of the "First International Forum on Freedom of the Press, Human Rights and Against Impunity". The first conference occurred on 27 March 2013 at the Press Club of France in Paris.

Freddy holds numerous accreditations including an Accreditation at Matignon with the Prime Minister of France, an Accreditation with the French Senate, as well as Accreditation with the Palais des Nations in Geneva, Switzerland where the United Nations Human Rights Council is located.

== Education ==
After his studies in Paris, and having experienced the outbreak of free radios in France, he returned to the Democratic Republic of Congo where he created "Réveil FM", the first community radio station in Kinshasa.

== Political Commitment ==
On 7 June 1999 Freddy Mulongo created free radio "Réveil FM" to bring Kinshasa inhabitants proximity information. It began broadcasting on 20 November of the same year. On 14 September 2000 an order of the Congolese government stopped the broadcast of Réveil FM as well as other radio stations. In March 2001, he initiated the Festival "Free Frequencies for Radio Pluralism" in the People's Palace in Kinshasa and was later elected President of the Association of Community Radios and Associative Congo (Arco).

In August 2006 Freddy participated at the World General Assembly of Amarc in Amman Jordan. In Kinshasa and on the eve of the proclamation of the results of the first round of the presidential election, the High Media Authority (HAM) announced that it was suspending "Réveil FM" citing as a reason the "lack of [a] program schedule". The HAM announcement was viewed as a coup to reduce press freedoms and was seen a sword in the side by the more than 165 radio stations present at the Amman conference. In response radio stations and representatives attending the assembly signed a protest petition in support of Freddy Mulongo and "Réveil FM".

Freddy served as President of Arco from 2001-2007 and in 2006 organized radio silence days in the Congo as a protest against the administration's efforts to silence the Third Sector (Media) as well as an effort to dismantle the alternative media within the Congolese media landscape. Freddy's efforts were extraordinary. In 2001, there were only 10 radio stations in the Congo. When he left the country in 2007 to return to France, the Democratic Republic of Congo had over 250 associative and community radios, the same number as South Africa. And as mentioned earlier, Freddy is co-organizer, along with his colleague Roger Bongos, of the First International Forum for Press Freedom, Human Rights and Against Impunity with its inaugural conference occurring on 27 March 2013 at the France2 TV Press Club in Paris, France.

From Paris, Réveil FM became Réveil FM International and is now broadcasting on the net and includes daily and weekly articles, photos, blog posts, videos and interviews of people and events around the world.

== Current Information ==
On 25 April 2012, Freddy Mulongo questioned then French Presidential candidate, François Hollande, for Réveil FM during the two rounds of the presidential election during a press conference with 300 accredited journalists. The specific inquiries were as follows:

"Mr Holland, once elected, will you go to the XIVè Francophonie summit to be held from 12 to 14 October 2012 in Kinshasa [Congo]? And what will be your implementation strategies as it relates to the 'Françafrique'?" (While there was electoral hold-up recognized by observers of the European Union, the Carter Center, the Catholic Church and the United Nations)

== Personal life ==
Mulongo's father, also named Freddy Mulongo, was a Congolese footballer, musician, and politician who was part of the Congo-Kinshasa national team's 1968 African Cup of Nations-winning team.

== Publications ==
Published Books in French :

- L'intelligentsia congolaise, militante, résistante et patriotique, Diaspora-République démocratique du Congo, Edilivre éd. ISBN 9782334236522, 30 mars 2017
- Kabilapocalypse, Régime des ventriotes et Moyibicrates République démocratique du Congo ISBN 9782334240963, 30 mars 2017
- Au temps des effroyables imposteurs de la RDC , Edilivre éd., Classique collection, 2014 ISBN 9782332779441
- En toute liberté, Edilivre éd., Classique collection, 2012 ISBN 978-2332494559
- Citoyenneté, droits et libertés, Edilivre éd., Classique collection, 2012 ISBN 9782332494559 (br.). - ISBN 9782332494566 (numérique)
- Les dix Questions, Edilivre éd., Classique collection, 2009 ISBN 9782812113031
