= Shittu =

Shittu may refer to

- Amusa Shittu (1937–2012), Nigerian footballer
- Daniel Shittu (born 1980), Nigerian footballer
- Shittu Alao (born 1937), Nigerian Air Force's Chief of the Air Staff
- Simisola Shittu (born 1999), British-born Canadian basketball player
- Sulley Shittu (born 1946), Ghanaian boxer of the 1960s and '70s
