= Ibrahima Kandia Diallo =

Guinean footballer (1941–2018)

Personal information
- Date of birth: 15 November 1941
- Place of birth: Conakry, Guinea
- Date of death: 10 May 2018 (aged 76)
- Place of death: Paris, France
- Position: Forward

International career
Years	Team	Apps	(Gls)
1960–1973	Guinea	56	(33)

Ibrahima Kandia Diallo (15 November 1941 – 10 May 2018) was a Guinean footballer, playing in 56 games and scoring 33 goals. He competed in the men's tournament at the 1968 Summer Olympics.

== International goals ==
Scores and results list Guinea's goal tally first, score column indicates score after each Diallo goal.

List of international goals scored by Ibrahima Diallo
No.	Date	Venue	Opponent	Score	Result	Competition
1	2 October 1960	Monrovia, Liberia	Liberia	5–0	5–0	Friendly
2	7 May 1961	Conakry, Guinea	Mali	2–3	2–3	Friendly
3	7 May 1961	Conakry, Guinea	Mali	2–3	2–3	Friendly
4	29 December 1961	Conakry, Guinea	Liberia	5–2	5–2	Kwame Nkrumah Cup
5	29 December 1961	Conakry, Guinea	Liberia	5–2	5–2	Kwame Nkrumah Cup
6	29 December 1961	Conakry, Guinea	Liberia	5–2	5–2	Kwame Nkrumah Cup
7	1 April 1962	Bamako, Mali	Mali	1–3	1–3	Kwame Nkrumah Cup
8	16 December 1962	Conakry, Guinea	East Germany	2–3	2–3	Friendly
9	16 December 1962	Conakry, Guinea	East Germany	2–3	2–3	Friendly
10	2 October 1963	Conakry, Guinea	Ivory Coast	1–0	2–0	Friendly
11	2 October 1963	Conakry, Guinea	Ivory Coast	2–0	2–0	Friendly
12	6 October 1963	Conakry, Guinea	Nigeria	1–0	1–0	1963 African Cup of Nations qualification
13	3 October 1964	Conakry, Guinea	Dahomey	5–2	5–2	Friendly
14	25 December 1964	Abidjan, Côte d'Ivoire	Ivory Coast	1–1	1–1	1965 All-Africa Games qualification
15	31 December 1964	Abidjan, Côte d'Ivoire	Ghana U23	3–3	3–3	1965 All-Africa Games qualification
16	31 December 1964	Abidjan, Côte d'Ivoire	Ghana U23	3–3	3–3	1965 All-Africa Games qualification
17	31 March 1965	Conakry, Guinea	Senegal	3–1	3–1	1965 African Cup of Nations qualification
18	18 April 1965	Conakry, Guinea	Liberia	7–0	7–0	Friendly
19	18 April 1965	Conakry, Guinea	Liberia	7–0	7–0	Friendly
20	6 March 1966	Conakry, Guinea	Senegal	5–0	5–0	Friendly
21	25 February 1967	Conakry, Guinea	Senegal	3–0	3–0	1968 African Cup of Nations qualification
22	19 March 1967	Dakar, Senegal	Senegal	1–4	1–4	1968 African Cup of Nations qualification
23	2 April 1967	Conakry, Guinea	Liberia	3–0	3–0	1968 African Cup of Nations qualification
24	31 March 1968	Conakry, Guinea	Upper Volta	3–1	3–1	Friendly
25	10 April 1968	Cotonou, Benin	Dahomey	4–2	4–2	Friendly
26	26 June 1968	Casablanca, Morocco	Algeria	2–2	2–2	1968 Summer Olympics qualification
27	4 April 1969	Conakry, Guinea	Niger	5–0	5–0	Friendly
28	11 May 1969	Lomé, Togo	Togo	1–1	1–1	1970 African Cup of Nations qualification
29	12 October 1969	Conakry, Guinea	Senegal	4–3	4–3	1970 African Cup of Nations qualification
30	12 October 1969	Conakry, Guinea	Senegal	4–3	4–3	1970 African Cup of Nations qualification
31	8 January 1973	Ibadan, Nigeria	Egypt	4–1	4–1	1973 All-Africa Games
32	11 January 1973	Ibadan, Nigeria	Congo	5–1	5–1	1973 All-Africa Games
33	11 January 1973	Ibadan, Nigeria	Congo	5–1	5–1	1973 All-Africa Games
