= Messaoud Belloucif =

Algerian footballer (born 1940)

Personal information
- Date of birth: 30 November 1940 (age 85)
- Place of birth: El Khroub, Algeria

Senior career*
Years	Team	Apps	(Gls)
1962–1975	AS Khroub		

International career
1964–1968	Algeria	15	(0)
- * Club domestic league appearances and goals

Messaoud Belloucif (born 30 November 1940) is an Algerian footballer. He played in 15 matches for the Algeria national football team from 1964 to 1968. He was also named in Algeria's squad for the 1968 African Cup of Nations tournament.
