= Freddy Mulongo (footballer) =

Congolese footballer (1939–2015)

Personal information
- Full name: Freddy Mulongo Mulunda Mukena
- Date of birth: 9 March 1939
- Place of birth: Élisabethville, Belgian Congo
- Date of death: 29 May 2015 (aged 76)
- Position: Defender

Youth career
- TP Mazembe

Senior career*
| Years | Team | Apps | (Gls) |
| –1959 | TP Mazembe | | |
| 1959–1962 | RCS Verviétois | 17+ | (2+) |
| 1962–1966 | Standard Liège | 50+ | (0+) |
- CS Imana

International career
| 1956–1968 | Congo-Kinshasa | | |
- * Club domestic league appearances and goals

Freddy Mulongo Mulunda Mukena (9 March 1939 – 29 May 2015) was a Congolese footballer, musician, and politician. As a footballer, he played as a defender.

== Football career ==
Mulongo started playing football in his hometown of Élisabethville at the age of 10 with TP Mazembe. While on a tour in Belgium with the Belgian Congo national team, he caught the attention of club official, and later joined Belgian club RCS Verviétois in 1959, becoming one of the first Congolese footballers to play in Europe. He later played for Standard Liège, where he won the Belgian First Division title in the 1962–63 season, before departing the club in 1966.

Mulongo made his debut for the Belgian Congo/Congo-Kinshasa national team at the age of 17 in 1956. In 1968, he was called up for the country's 1968 African Cup of Nations squad, which they won, although he failed to make an appearance.

== Outside of football ==
While in Belgium, Mulongo also persuade a music career. After returning to the Democratic Republic of Congo, he helped to pioneer one of the first comic strips in the country, before going into politics, where he served several positions in Zaire, as well as an ambassador-at-large under Laurent-Désiré Kabila, and an Ambassador for Peace of the Universal Peace Federation.

== Personal life and death ==
Mulongo had nine siblings, with him being the second oldest. His son, also named Freddy Mulongo, is a Congolese journalist who works in France. While at Standard Liege, he studied at the University of Liège, graduating with a degree in electronics engineering.

Mulongo died on 29 May 2015, following a battle with an illness. His funeral was held in Brussels on 8 July by the Embassy of the Democratic Republic of the Congo, with notable Congolese musicians like Lokua Kanza, Barly Baruti, Marie Daulne, and Coco Malabar in attendance.
