= Mohamed Abrouk =

Algerian footballer (born 1945)

Personal information
- Date of birth: 30 November 1945 (age 80)
- Place of birth: Belouizdad, French Algeria

International career
Years	Team	Apps	(Gls)
1967–1973	Algeria	12	(0)

Mohamed Abrouk (born 30 November 1945) is an Algerian footballer. He played in 12 matches for the Algeria national football team from 1967 to 1973. He was also named in Algeria's squad for the 1968 African Cup of Nations tournament.
