= Football at the 1965 All-Africa Games =

1965 All-Africa Games football tournament
Tournament details
- Host country: Congo
- City: Brazzaville
- Dates: 19–25 July
- Teams: 8 (from 1 confederation)
- Venue: 2 (in 1 host city)

Final positions
- Champions: Congo (1st title)
- Runners-up: Mali
- Third place: Ivory Coast
- Fourth place: Algeria

Tournament statistics
- Matches played: 20
- Goals scored: 73 (3.65 per match)

The 1965 All-Africa Games football tournament was the 1st edition of the African Games men's football tournament. The football tournament was held in Brazzaville, the Republic of the Congo between 19–25 July 1965 as part of the 1965 All-Africa Games.

== Qualified teams ==
The following countries have qualified for the final tournament:

Zone	Team
Hosts	Congo
Zone I	Algeria
Zone II	Mali
Zone III	Ivory Coast
Zone IV	Togo
Zone V	Congo Léopoldville
Zone VI	Uganda
Zone VII	Madagascar

== Group stage ==
=== Group 1 ===
Team	Pld	W	D	L	GF	GA	GD	Pts
Mali	3	2	0	1	8	4	+4	4
Congo	3	2	0	1	10	5	+5	4
Togo	3	1	1	1	5	9	–4	3
Uganda	3	0	1	2	3	8	–5	1

19 July 1965

Congo	2–1	Uganda

Stade de la Révolution, Brazzaville
19 July 1965

Mali	1–2	Togo
Diakhité 23'		Fiawoo 75', 77'

Brazzaville

20 July 1965

Congo	7–2	Togo

Stade de la Révolution, Brazzaville
20 July 1965

Mali	5–1	Uganda

Brazzaville

21 July 1965

Congo	1–2	Mali

Stade de la Révolution, Brazzaville
21 July 1965

Togo	1–1	Uganda

Brazzaville

=== Group 2 ===
Team	Pld	W	D	L	GF	GA	GD	Pts
Ivory Coast	3	2	1	0	7	1	+6	5
Algeria	3	2	0	1	5	2	+3	4
Congo-Léopoldville	3	1	1	1	9	5	+4	3
Madagascar	3	0	0	3	0	13	–13	0

19 July 1965

Ivory Coast	1–0	Algeria
Manglé 75'

Brazzaville
Attendance: 12 000
Referee: ... N'Gom (Senegal)
19 July 1965

Madagascar	0–7	Congo-Léopoldville

Brazzaville

20 July 1965

Ivory Coast	5–0	Madagascar

Brazzaville
20 July 1965

Algeria	4–1	Congo-Léopoldville
Zefzef 18'; Hachouf 50', 67', 73'		Gabega 62'

Brazzaville
Attendance: 7 000
Referee: ... Attig (Tunisia)

21 July 1965

Ivory Coast	1–1	Congo-Léopoldville

Brazzaville
21 July 1965

Algeria	1–0	Madagascar
Lalmas 55'

Brazzaville
Attendance: 7 000
Referee: ... Faber (Guinea)

== Knockout stage ==
Semifinals
23 July – Brazzaville
Mali (a.e.t.)	2
Algeria	1
23 July – Brazzaville
Ivory Coast	0
Congo	1

Final
25 July – Brazzaville
Congo (c.k)	0 (7)
Mali	0 (2)
Third place
25 July – Brazzaville
Ivory Coast	2
Algeria	0

=== Semifinals ===
23 July 1965

Mali	2–1 (a.e.t.)	Algeria
Samabaly 3'; Kéïta 136'		Hachouf 33'

Brazzaville

23 July 1965

Ivory Coast	0–1	Congo
		M'Bono 19'

Brazzaville

=== Third place match ===
25 July 1965

Ivory Coast	2–0	Algeria

Stade de la Révolution, Brazzaville

=== Final ===
25 July 1965

Congo	0–0 (a.e.t.)	Mali
	7–2 (c.k)

Stade de la Révolution, Brazzaville

== Classification matches ==
5th place bracket

5–8th place semifinals
25 July – Brazzaville
Congo Léop.	5
Togo	1
25 July – Brazzaville
Uganda	5
Madagascar	0

Fifth place
26 July – Brazzaville
Congo Léop.	6
Uganda	2
Seventh place
26 July – Brazzaville
Togo	1
Madagascar	0

=== 5–8th place semifinals ===
25 July 1965

Congo-Léopoldville	5–1	Togo

Brazzaville

25 July 1965

Uganda	5–0	Madagascar

Brazzaville

=== Seventh place match ===
26 July 1965

Togo	1–0	Madagascar

Brazzaville

=== Fifth place match ===
26 July 1965

Congo-Léopoldville	6–2	Uganda

Brazzaville

== Final ranking ==
Rank	Team	Pld	W	D	L	GF	GA	GD	Pts
1	Congo (H)	5	3	1	1	11	5	+6	7
2	Mali	5	3	1	1	10	5	+5	7
3	Ivory Coast	5	3	1	1	9	2	+7	7
4	Algeria	5	2	0	3	6	6	0	4
Eliminated in the group stage
5	Congo Léopoldville	5	3	1	1	20	8	+12	7
6	Uganda	5	1	1	3	10	14	−4	3
7	Togo	5	2	1	2	7	14	−7	5
8	Madagascar	5	0	0	5	0	19	−19	0
Total		40	17	6	17	73	73	0	40
