= Ahmed Bouden =

Algerian footballer (born 1938)

Personal information
- Date of birth: 4 December 1938 (age 87)

International career
| Years | Team | Apps | (Gls) |
| 1964–1968 | Algeria | 6 | (0) |

Ahmed Bouden (born 4 December 1938) is an Algerian footballer. He played in six matches for the Algeria national football team from 1964 to 1968. He was also named in Algeria's squad for the 1968 African Cup of Nations tournament.
