= Ali Attoui =

Algerian footballer (born 1942)

Personal information
- Full name: Ali Attoui
- Date of birth: January 21, 1942 (age 84)
- Place of birth: Annaba, Algeria
- Position: Defender

Senior career*
Years	Team	Apps	(Gls)
1961–1962	AS Bône	-	(-)
1962–1964	JBAC Bône	-	(-)
1964–1976	Hamra Annaba	-	(-)

International career
1965–1971	Algeria	34	(0)
- * Club domestic league appearances and goals

Ali Attoui (born January 21, 1942, in Annaba) is a retired Algerian international football player.

== Career ==
Attoui spent the majority of his career with Hamra Annaba, with brief stints with AS Bône, and JBAC Bône. He also represented Algeria at the 1968 African Cup of Nations.

== Honours ==
- Won the Algerian Cup one with Hamra Annaba in 1972
