= Lakhdar Bouyahi =

Algerian footballer (1946–2025)

Personal information
- Date of birth: 21 January 1946
- Place of birth: Algiers, French Algeria
- Date of death: 24 January 2025 (aged 79)
- Position: Defender

Senior career*
| Years | Team | Apps | (Gls) |
- NA Hussein Dey

International career
| 1967–1968 | Algeria | 7 | (1) |
- * Club domestic league appearances and goals

Lakhdar Bouyahi (21 June 1946 – 24 January 2025) was an Algerian footballer who played as a defender for NA Hussein Dey. He made seven appearances for the Algeria national team in 1967 and 1968. He was also named in Algeria's squad for the 1968 African Cup of Nations tournament. Bouyahi died on 24 January 2025, at the age of 79.
