= Ned Djilali =

Canadian engineering professor and researcher

- Born: Nedjib (Ned) Djilali; 1 August 1953 (age 73); Algiers，Algeria
- Education: Lycée Technique d’Alger, University of Hertfordshire, Imperial College, University of British Columbia
- Awards: Ludwig Mond Prize, Institution of Mechanical Engineers (UK) (1998); Fellow, Canadian Society for Mechanical Engineering (2003); Fellow, Canadian Academy of Engineering(2010); Honorary Professor, Tianjin University(2013); Fellow, Royal Society of Canada(2013); Highly Cited Researcher(2014; 2015); Jules Stachiewicz Medal, Canadian Society for Mechanical Engineering (2017); David H. Turpin Gold Medal for Career Achievement in Research, University of Victoria (2018)
- Scientific career
- Fields: Energy modeling; fuel cell; transport phenomena; computational fluid dynamics

Nedjib Djilali (born August 1, 1953) is a Canadian engineering professor and researcher specializing in sustainable energy and thermofluid sciences. He holds the Canada Research Chair in Advanced Energy Systems Design and Computational Modelling at the University of Victoria. Djilali is a Highly Cited Researcher, and a fellow of both the Canadian Academy of Engineering (2010) and the Royal Society of Canada (2013).

== Biography ==
Djilali was born and raised in Algeria and educated in the UK and Canada. After completing a BSc (Hon.) in Aeronautical Engineering at the University of Hertfordshire and a MSc in aeronautics at Imperial College, London he served with the Air Force (compulsory military service) and then worked as an airworthiness engineer and as a lecturer at the Ecole Nationale des Techniques de l'Aviation Civile, Algeria. He moved to Canada in 1982, earned a PhD in experimental and computational fluid dynamics from the University of British Columbia in 1987, and joined the Advanced Aerodynamics Department of Bombardier Aerospace, Montreal in 1989, where he worked on the design of the Canadair Regional Jet and on the development of advanced CFD methods. He was appointed at the University of Victoria in 1991.

== Work ==
Prof. Djilali's earliest work focused on computational and experimental fluid mechanics and heat transfer, including fundamental aspects of complex turbulence, thermosolutal transport in epitaxial crystal growth of semiconductors, and membrane separation processes for desalination and water purification. He is particularly known for his contributions to fuel cell science and technology, and for his work on sustainable energy modeling. His seminal work includes pioneering computational modeling of transport phenomena in fuel cells, and novel fuel cell architectures. His energy systems analysis work has focused on demand response methods to achieve high penetration of renewable energy in electric power systems, and the water-energy nexus.

Djilali has served as director of UVic's Institute for Integrated Energy Systems and of the Pacific Institute for Climate Solutions, leading and facilitating the development and implementation of low-carbon energy systems, and forming collaborative partnerships with automotive and clean energy technology companies and organizations around the world including Ballard, Toyota, AECL, and CFD Research Corporation. Djilali was a member of the task force that developed the “BC Hydrogen & Fuel Cell Industry Strategy” reporting to the Premier's Technology Council. He was a high-level visiting researcher with the CNRS Institut de Mécanique des Fluides de Toulouse (France) in 1997–1998, an ERCOFTAC visiting fellow with ETH in 2003, a visiting professor with the NRC Institute for Fuel Cell Innovation in 2004, a professor in residence with Angstrom Power Inc. in 2005, and a visiting professor with NEXT Energy, University of Oldenburg in 2016. Djilali was also appointed guest professor at Chongqing University and Shanghai University, and honorary professor at Tianjin University. He was a member of the founding editorial board of the ASME Journal of Fuel Cell Science & Technology (now Journal of Electrochemical Energy Conversion and Storage), and served on the board of several other journals. Prof. Djilali was President of the CFD Society of Canada from 2000 to 2002, and chaired the CFD97 Conference and ISTP-20 (Int. Symposium on Transport Phenomena).
