= Football at the 1965 All-Africa Games – Men's qualification =

The men's qualification for football tournament at the 1965 All-Africa Games.

== Qualification ==
=== Zone I (North Africa) ===
Team 1	Agg.	Team 2	1st leg	2nd leg
Algeria	1–0	Tunisia	1–0	0–0

27 December 1964

Algeria	1–0	Tunisia
Bentahar 89'

El-Annasser Stadium, Algiers
Attendance: 15,000
Referee: ... Azahar (Morocco)
14 March 1965

Tunisia	0–0	Algeria

Stade Chedly Zouiten, Tunis
Attendance: 20,000
Referee: Mohamed Boukili (Morocco)

Algeria qualified; Libya and Morocco withdrew the qualification.

=== Zone II (West Africa 1) ===
==== First round ====
Team 1	Agg.	Team 2	1st leg	2nd leg
Mali	–	(The Gambia) Gambia	–	–
Senegal	w/o	Mauritania	—	—

... December 1964

Mali	–	Gambia

... December 1964

Gambia	–	Mali

Mali advanced to the second round

==== Second round ====
Team 1	Agg.	Team 2	1st leg	2nd leg
Senegal	3–4	Mali	3–0	0–4

7 March 1965

Senegal	3–0	Mali

Stade Demba Diop, Dakar
14 March 1965

Mali	4–0	Senegal

Stade Mamadou Konaté, Bamako

Mali qualified.

=== Zone III (West Africa 2) ===
The tournament was held in Abidjan, Ivory Coast.

Team	Pld	W	D	L	GF	GA	GD	Pts
Ivory Coast	3	2	1	0	6	3	+3	5
Ghana	3	1	1	1	8	5	+3	3
Guinea	3	0	3	0	7	7	0	3
Liberia	3	0	1	2	6	12	–6	1

25 December 1964

Ivory Coast	1–1	Guinea

Abidjan
26 December 1964

Ghana	5–1	Liberia

Abidjan

30 December 1964

Ivory Coast	4–2	Liberia

Abidjan
31 December 1964

Ghana	3–3	Guinea

Abidjan

1 Janvier 1965

Guinea	3–3	Liberia

Abidjan
2 Janvier 1965

Ivory Coast	1–0	Ghana

Abidjan

Ivory Coast qualified.

=== Zone IV (West Africa 3) ===
The tournament was held in Lagos, Nigeria. 3-2-1 points system was taken.

Team	Pld	W	D	L	GF	GA	GD	Pts
Togo	4	3	1	0	9	4	+3	11
Nigeria	4	3	0	1	11	3	+8	10
Dahomey	4	1	1	2	6	6	0	7
Upper Volta	4	1	1	2	6	10	–4	7
Niger	4	0	1	3	4	13	–9	5

27 December 1964

Nigeria	1–2	Togo

Lagos
27 December 1964

Niger	2–4	Dahomey

Lagos

29 December 1964

Nigeria	6–1	Upper Volta

Lagos
30 December 1964

Togo	3–0	Niger

Lagos

31 December 1964

Upper Volta	2–0	Dahomey

Lagos
1 January 1965

Nigeria	4–0	Niger

Lagos

2 January 1965

Nigeria	Abandoned	Dahomey

Lagos
3 January 1965

Togo	2–1	Upper Volta

Lagos

4 January 1965

Togo	2–2	Dahomey

Lagos
5 January 1965

Niger	2–2	Upper Volta

Lagos

Togo qualified.

=== Zone V (Central Africa) ===
The tournament was held in Léopoldville, Congo Léopoldville.

Team	Pld	W	D	L	GF	GA	GD	Pts
Congo Léopoldville	6	6	0	0				12
Cameroon	6	4	0	2				10
Central African Republic	6							6
Chad	6							4

... April 1965

Congo Léopoldville	–	Chad

Léopoldville
... April 1965

Cameroon	–	Central African Republic

Léopoldville

... April 1965

Chad	–	Central African Republic

Léopoldville
... April 1965

Congo Léopoldville	3–2	Cameroon

Léopoldville

... April 1965

Cameroon	–	Chad

Léopoldville
... April 1965

Congo Léopoldville	–	Central African Republic

Léopoldville

... April 1965

Congo Léopoldville	–	Chad

Léopoldville
... April 1965

Cameroon	–	Central African Republic

Léopoldville

... April 1965

Chad	–	Central African Republic

Léopoldville
... April 1965

Congo Léopoldville	3–1	Cameroon

Léopoldville

... April 1965

Cameroon	9–0	Chad

Léopoldville
... April 1965

Congo Léopoldville	8–2	Central African Republic

Léopoldville

Congo Léopoldville qualified; in addition, Congo qualified as hosts.

=== Zone VI (East Africa) ===
The tournament was held in Kampala, Uganda. Ethiopia, Somalia and Sudan withrew the tournament.

Team	Pld	W	D	L	GF	GA	GD	Pts
Uganda	2	1	0	1	6	4	+2	2
Kenya	2	1	0	1	6	5	+1	2
United Arab Republic	2	1	0	1	5	8	–3	2

23 March 1965

Uganda	1–3	Kenya

Kampala

25 March 1965

United Arab Republic	4–3	Kenya

Kampala

27 March 1965

Uganda	5–1	United Arab Republic

Kampala

Uganda qualified.

=== Zone VII (Southern Africa) ===
The tournament was held in Dar El Salam, Tanzania. Burundi, Malawi, Rwanda and Zambia withdrew.

Team	Pld	W	D	L	GF	GA	GD	Pts
Madagascar	2	1	0	1	6	3	+3	2
Tanzania	2	1	0	1	3	6	–3	2

13 March 1965

Tanzania	1–5	Madagascar

Dar El Salam

15 March 1965

Tanzania	2–1	Madagascar

Dar El Salam

Madagascar qualified.

== Qualified teams ==
The following countries have qualified for the final tournament:

Zone	Team
Hosts	Congo
Zone I	Algeria
Zone II	Mali
Zone III	Ivory Coast
Zone IV	Togo
Zone V	Congo Léopoldville
Zone VI	Uganda
Zone VII	Madagascar
