= Djilali Selmi =

Algerian footballer (1946–2025)

Personal information
- Date of birth: 4 September 1946
- Place of birth: Belcourt, French Algeria
- Date of death: 7 October 2025 (aged 79)
- Position: Midfielder

Youth career
- 1964-1967: OM Ruisseau

Senior career*
Years	Team	Apps	(Gls)
1967-1979	CR Belcourt		

International career
1967–1973	Algeria	10	(0)
- * Club domestic league appearances and goals

Djilali Selmi (Arabic: جيلالي سلمي; 4 September 1946 – 7 October 2025) was an Algerian footballer who played as a midfielder. Selmi played in 10 matches for the Algeria national team between 1967 and 1973, representing Algeria at the 1968 African Cup of Nations.

Born in Belcourt, he played the majority of his career for hometown club CR Belcourt, winning two league titles and two domestic cups with the club. Selmi died on 7 October 2025, at the age of 79.
