= Edward Boye =

Ghanaian footballer

Personal information
- Date of birth: 1946 (age 79–80)

International career
Years	Team	Apps	(Gls)
- Ghana

Edward Boye (born 1946) is a Ghanaian footballer. He competed in the men's tournament at the 1972 Summer Olympics.
