= Mustapha Seridi =

Algerian footballer (born 1941)

Personal information
- Date of birth: 18 April 1941 (age 85)
- Position: Midfielder

International career
Years	Team	Apps	(Gls)
1964–1970	Algeria	16	(1)

Mustapha Seridi (born 18 April 1941) is an Algerian former footballer who played as a midfielder. Seridi played in 16 matches for the Algeria national team between 1964 and 1970, representing Algeria at the 1968 African Cup of Nations.
