= Djilali Mehri =

Algerian businessman (born 1937)

Accor hotels Algeria, Chairman and CEO
- In office July 15, 2005 – Unknown

Personal details
- Born: December 15, 1937 (age 88)

Djilali Mehri (Arabic: الجيلالي مهري) is the chairman and CEO of Pepsi Algeria, the holding Maghreb and the Middle East Investors, and he has a project to build 36 hotels with the Accor in major cities in Algeria such as Algiers, Constantine and Oran.

== Biography ==
Born on December 15, 1937, in El Oued, Algeria, Djilali Mehri initially started with his first project, Daouia Farm, founded by Djilali Mehri, who was successful in international commerce before turning to agriculture, and sets the pace for local innovation. Neither a farmer nor the son of a farmer, Mehri simply believed that his homeland could produce anything, and he foresaw the possibilities offered by the then-new technologies of hybrid seedlings and drip irrigation. Beginning in 1985 with 54 hectares (130 acres), and now farming a dense expanse of 700 hectares (1,700 acres), Daouia produces pears, pomegranates, and pistachios, all marketed nationwide and gradually entering the European market. He planted date palms, eucalyptus for its value in water management, and, in 1990, he introduced olive-growing to El-Oued, his most promising innovation.

- -in the mid-1990s, he built his new factory Pepsi Cola, Algeria .
- -in 1997, he became an independent MP in the Algerian parliament
- -in 2005, he start a big project with Accor to build 36 hotels across Algeria.
