= Henri Konan =

Ivorian footballer

Personal information
- Full name: Henri Konan "Zabla"
- Date of birth: 1937
- Place of birth: Ivory Coast
- Date of death: 28 March 2009 (aged 72)
- Place of death: Abidjan, Ivory Coast
- Position: Defender

Senior career*
Years	Team	Apps	(Gls)
?–?	Stade d'Abidjan		

International career
1961–1968	Ivory Coast	31	(1)
- * Club domestic league appearances and goals

Henri Konan "Zabla" (1937 – 28 March 2009) is a former Ivory Coast international football central defender who played for Stade d'Abidjan.

== Club career ==
Konan played club football for Stade d'Abidjan during the 1960s and helped the club win the 1966 African Cup of Champions Clubs, its first continental title.

He was one of the Ivorian footballer honored by the Confederation of African Football at its 50th anniversary in 2009.

== International career ==
Konan made several appearances for the Ivory Coast national football team, and he played for Ivory Coast at the 1965 and 1968 African Cup of Nations finals, where he would score a goal in the semi-final.

== Personal ==
Konan died at age 72 in March 2009.
