= Yatma Diop =

Senegalese footballer (born 1943)

Personal information
- Full name: Moustapha Diop
- Date of birth: 30 April 1943 (age 83)
- Place of birth: Dakar, French West Africa (now Senegal)
- Position: Forward

Senior career*
Years	Team	Apps	(Gls)
1961–1962	Avenir Dakar		
1962–1963	Foyer de Jeunes de Casamance		
1962–1963	Foyer France Sénégal		
1966–1967	Annecy		
1967–1968	Foyer France Sénégal		
1968–1971	Amiens	17+	(6+)

International career
1967–1968	Senegal	5+	(2+)
- * Club domestic league appearances and goals

Moustapha Diop (born 30 April 1943), also known as Yatma Diop, is a Senegalese former footballer who played as a forward.

== Career ==
Diop started his career as a goalkeeper, but switched to being a forward following an injury. Additionally, he played basketball in his youth for Trésor Sporting Club. He played for Avenir Dakar, Foyer de Jeunes de Casamance, and Foyer France Sénégal, before joining French side Annecy in 1966, becoming one of the first West African footballers to play in Europe. In 1968, he won the double with Foyer France Sénégal, winning both the Ligue 1 title and the Senegal FA Cup, where he scored a hat-trick in the final against US Gorée. He retired from football in 1971, at the age of 28.

Diop played for the Senegal national team during the 1960s, becoming the first Senegalese player based outside the country to play for the national team. He played for Senegal at the 1968 African Cup of Nations, scoring twice in the group stage, and being named one of the best players of the tournament.

By 2024, he was the technical director of ASC Jaraaf.

== Personal life ==
His son, Malick, is a football manager, who was the manager of US Ouakam in 2014.
