= Amusa Shittu =

Nigerian footballer

Personal information
- Date of birth: 1937
- Place of birth: Jos, Nigeria
- Date of death: 13 March 2012 (aged 75)
- Place of death: Lagos, Nigeria

Senior career*
Years	Team	Apps	(Gls)
- Plateau United
- Northern Region XI
- ECN

International career
- Nigeria
- * Club domestic league appearances and goals

Amusa Shittu (1937 – 13 March 2012) was a Nigerian international footballer.

== Career ==
Born in Jos, Shittu played club football for Plateau United, Northern Region XI and ECN.

He made his international debut for Nigeria in 1960, appearing in FIFA World Cup qualifying matches. He also appeared in Olympics qualifying matches.
