= Pierre Kalala Mukendi =

Congolese footballer (1939–2015)

Pierre Kalala
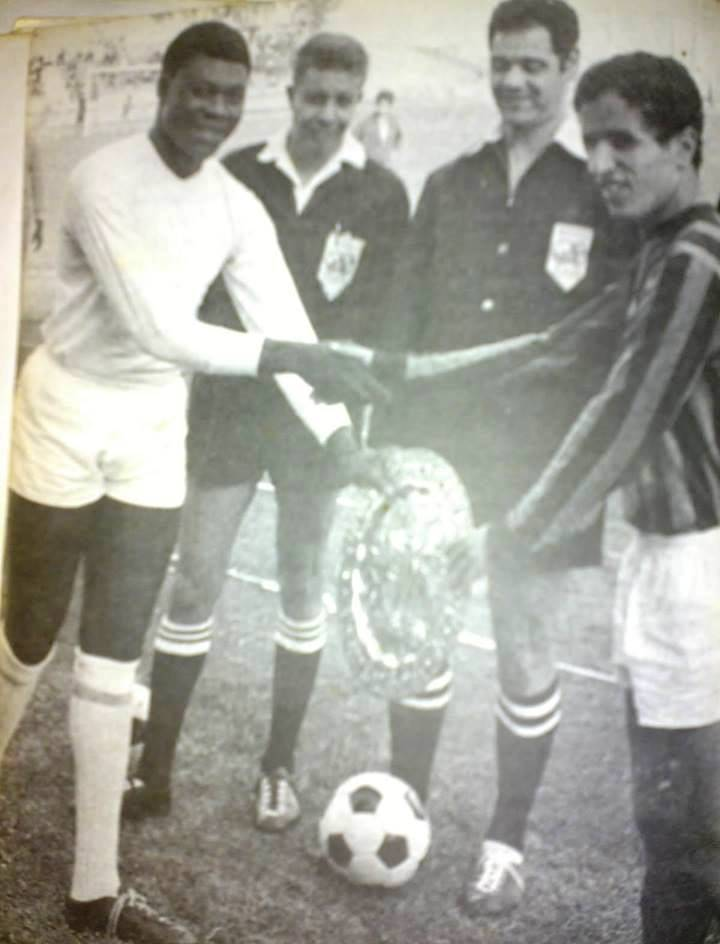
- Kalala (left) with Driss Bamous of FAR Rabat in 1969

Personal information
- Full name: Pierre Kalala Mukendi
- Date of birth: 22 November 1939
- Place of birth: Jadotville, Belgian Congo
- Date of death: 30 June 2015 (aged 75)
- Place of death: Johannesburg, South Africa
- Height: 1.84 m (6 ft 0 in)
- Position: Forward

Senior career*
Years	Team	Apps	(Gls)
1958–1962	US Panda		
1962–1974	TP Engelbert		

International career
1963–1970	Zaire	4	(6)

Managerial career
- 1979–1981: TP Engelbert
- 1992–1993: Zaire
- 1997–1998: DR Congo (technical director)
Medal record
Men's Football
Representing Congo-Kinshasa
Africa Cup of Nations
Winner	1968 Ethiopia
- * Club domestic league appearances and goals

Pierre Kalala Mukendi (22 November 1939 – 30 June 2015) was a Congolese football forward who played internationally for Congo-Kinshasa and also played for TP Engelbert called now TP Mazembe.

== Honours ==
=== Player ===
TP Engelbert

- Linafoot: 1966, 1967, 1969
- Coupe du Congo: 1966, 1967
- African Cup of Champions Clubs: 1967, 1968; runner-up 1969, 1970

Congo-Kinshasa

- African Cup of Nations: 1968

=== Manager ===
TP Engelbert

- African Cup Winners' Cup: 1980
