= Djilali Abdi =

Algerian footballer (1943–2022)

Personal information
- Date of birth: 25 November 1943
- Place of birth: Sidi Bel Abbès, French Algeria
- Date of death: 2 February 2022 (aged 78)
- Position: Midfielder

Senior career*
Years	Team	Apps	(Gls)
1962–1976	USM Bel Abbès		

International career
1967–1969	Algeria	6	(1)
- * Club domestic league appearances and goals

Djilali Abdi (25 November 1943 – 2 February 2022) was an Algerian footballer who played as a midfielder. He made six appearances for the Algeria national team from 1967 to 1969. He was also named in Algeria's squad for the 1968 African Cup of Nations tournament. He died on 2 February 2022, at the age of 78.
