= Denis Obua (footballer) =

Ugandan soccer player (1947-2010)

- Denis Obua

Personal information
- Full name: Denis Otim Obua
- Date of birth: June 13, 1947
- Place of birth: Akol, Amolatar District, Uganda
- Date of death: May 4, 2010 (aged 62)
- Position: Left winger

Senior career*
| Years | Team | Apps | (Gls) |
| 1967 | Coffee United | | |
| 1968–1978 | Police FC | | |
| 1978–1979 | Maroons FC | | |
| 1979 | Luo Union | | |
| 1980–1983 | Police FC | | |
| 1983 | SC Villa | | |

International career
| national_years1 | Uganda | | |
- * Club domestic league appearances and goals

Denis Obua (13 June 1947 – 4 May 2010) was a former Ugandan association football player and administrator, who played on the left-wing for Uganda between 1968 and 1977 and later served as president of the Federation of Uganda Football Associations (FUFA) and chairman of the Council for East and Central Africa Football Associations (CECAFA).

== Playing career ==
=== Club career ===
Denis Otim Obua was born on 13 June 1947 in the village of Akol in the Amolatar District of Uganda. He was educated at Boroboro Junior School and Manjasi High School, Tororo, where, in 1967, his talent was recognised and he was signed by Coffee United FC. The following year he joined Police FC, with whom he pursued parallel careers as a footballer and a policeman. In 1977, Obua was the league's top goalscorer, with 24 goals, but after Police were relegated at the end of the 1978 season he joined Maroons FC of Luzira.

Obua only played for Maroons for one season. In April 1979, the Ugandan dictator, Idi Amin, was ousted and, during the unstable period that followed, several players from Simba FC—a team which, at that time, was drawn entirely from serving Army officers—were arrested. To avoid a similar fate, Obua and a number of other soccer players fled to Kenya, where he played for Luo Union. He returned to Uganda in 1980 and rejoined Police FC, but could not regain his form and retired. In 1983, he came out of retirement and joined Villa SC, who had won the Ugandan Premier League championship the previous year.

Obua played for Villa in both second round matches of the 1983 African Cup of Champions Clubs, but, just before the first leg of the quarter-finals, he was injured in an incident that brought his playing career to an end. He was in a bar in Kamwokya when it was attacked by gunmen, who began shooting indiscriminately at the customers. Obua was shot in the abdomen and, though he was flown to West Germany for treatment, he was unable to resume playing.

=== International career ===
Denis Obua was called up to the national squad in 1967 and soon established himself in the left wing position. In 1968, he was selected to represent East Africa in a game against visiting English club West Bromwich Albion. Against Zanzibar in the 1969 East Africa Challenge Cup, he scored four goals in Uganda's 7–1 win and was a member of Uganda's CECAFA Cup-winning team on six occasions.

He represented Uganda in three Africa Cup of Nations tournaments, in 1968, 1974 and 1976, scoring one of Uganda's two goals in the latter tournament, but was dropped from the squad before the 1978 African Cup of Nations, in which Uganda reached the final.

Denis Obua is regarded as one of the best players to play at no. 11 for Uganda.

== Career as an administrator ==
In 1984 Obua started a new career as a coach, initially on a part-time basis, with his old club, Police FC. In 1995, he became the full-time coach and, under his guidance, the club gained promotion back to the Super League after a 19-year absence. At the national level, Obua managed the Uganda youth team at the 1991 All-Africa Games and in 1995 he managed the Uganda 'B' team that reached the final of the 1995 CECAFA Cup. In 1998, he was offered the post of coach to the national team, but turned it down. Instead, in December that year, he contested and won the election for president of FUFA. In 2001, he was re-elected to a second term and in 2003 he also became chairman of the Council for East and Central Africa Football Associations (CECAFA).

Beginning in late 2004, Obua was involved in controversy over the management of FUFA. On 30 November 2004, he announced that the executive board's term of office had expired; this was disputed by Obua's predecessor as FUFA president, Twaha Kakaire. Obua announced that new elections would be held in February 2005, but, a few days before the elections were due to be held, Uganda's Sports Minister suspended FUFA, pending an investigation of its affairs. A fortnight later, Obua announced that he was resigning as FUFA president. A pressure group of Ugandan soccer fans then brought charges against Obua and FUFA's former secretary-general, alleging that they had embezzled funds while in office. Obua was in Kenya on CECAFA business when the charges were laid and on his return to Kampala he was arrested for failing to appear in court. and spent two weeks in jail. Subsequently, Obua was one of 17 FUFA officials named by Uganda's Inspector General of Government as having been responsible for gross mismanagement of finances; the 17 were order to refund varying amounts to FUFA or face prosecution.

Obua continued to serve as chairman of CECAFA until his term expired, in 2007; he was appointed honorary chairman for CECAFA's General Assembly in 2007 and remained an honorary member until his death.

== Family ==
Denis Obua fathered 18 children. His son David is a former Ugandan international and played for Hearts in the Scottish Premier League. Another son, Eric, plays for SC Villa in the Ugandan Super League, while a third, Kevin, plays for his school, St Mary's Secondary School, Kitende. A daughter, Sarah Desire Birungi, captains the National Insurance Corporation netball team in Uganda's National Netball League.
