= Hacène Lalmas =

Algerian footballer (1943–2018)

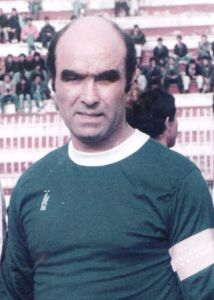

Personal information
- Full name: Hacène Lalmas
- Date of birth: March 12, 1943
- Place of birth: Algiers, Algeria
- Date of death: July 7, 2018 (aged 75)
- Place of death: Algiers, Algeria
- Height: 1.73 m (5 ft 8 in)
- Position: Attacking midfielder

Youth career
- 1954–1960: OM Ruisseau

Senior career*
Years	Team	Apps	(Gls)
1960–1962	OM Ruisseau	18	(24)
1962–1973	CR Belouizdad		(107)
1973–1975	NA Hussein Dey		
1975–1976	IR Santé		

International career
1963–1974	Algeria	43	(14)

Managerial career
- 1983: Algeria U17
- * Club domestic league appearances and goals

Hacène Lalmas (12 March 1943 – 7 July 2018), also known as El Kebch (The Ram), was an Algerian footballer who played as a midfielder.

Lalmas scored a record 131 goals in the Algerian championship. He was also voted as the 14th-best African player of all time by the CAF.

== Club career ==
Although he started his career with OM Ruisseau, Lalmas played most of his career for CR Belouizdad and it was with CRB. He led the club to four league titles, three cup titles and three Maghreb Champions Cup titles.

On 22 October 1962, during his career with OM Ruisseau, he scored 14 goals in his team's 18–0 victory over Birtouta, which is the record for most goals in one match in all top men's football leagues in the history, up until 3 August 2007, when Passang Tshering scored 17 goals in the Bhutan A-Division, which was the only league in the country at that time.

== Career statistics ==
=== International ===
Scores and results list Algeria's goal tally first. "Score" column indicates the score after the player's goal.

#	Date	Venue	Opponent	Score	Result	Competition
1.	22 March 1964	Alexandria Stadium, Alexandria	Egypt	1–1	2–2	Friendly
2.	4 November 1964	Stade El Annasser, Algiers	Soviet Union	2–1	2–2	Friendly
3.	19 July 1965	Stade Alphonse Massemba-Débat, Brazzaville	Madagascar	1–0	1–0	1965 All-Africa Games
4.	5 February 1967	Stade Modibo Kéïta, Bamako	Mali	0–2	0–3	1968 African Cup of Nations qualification
5.	12 February 1967	Stade Municipal, Ouagadougou	Upper Volta	1–2	1–2	1968 African Cup of Nations qualification
6.	12 September 1967	Stade Chedli Zouiten, Tunis	Morocco	0–2	1–3	1967 Mediterranean Games
7.	14 January 1968	Hailé Sélassié Stadium, Addis Ababa	Uganda	1–0	4–0	1968 African Cup of Nations
8.	14 January 1968	Hailé Sélassié Stadium, Addis Ababa	Uganda	2–0	4–0	1968 African Cup of Nations
9.	14 January 1968	Hailé Sélassié Stadium, Addis Ababa	Uganda	3–0	4–0	1968 African Cup of Nations
10.	26 June 1968	Stade Mohamed V, Casablanca	Guinea	1–0	2–2	1968 Olympic Games Qualifiers
11.	26 June 1968	Stade Mohamed V, Casablanca	Guinea	2–2	2–2	1968 Olympic Games Qualifiers
12.	30 June 1968	Stade Mohamed V, Casablanca	Guinea	1–0	2–3	1968 Olympic Games Qualifiers
13.	18 December 1968	Stade El Annasser, Algiers	France Ol.	–	2–5	Friendly
14.	25 December 1969	Stade El Annasser, Algiers	France Ol.	1–0	3–1	

== Honours ==
CR Belouizdad

- Algerian league: 1965, 1966, 1970, 1971
- Algerian Cup: 1966, 1969, 1970
- Maghreb Champions Cup: 1970, 1971, 1972

Individual

- Algerian league top scorer: 1969–70
