= Nicodème Kabamba =

Congolese footballer

Nicodème Kabamba Wa Kabengu (born 29 July 1936) is a Congolese former footballer who played as a midfielder. He grew up in Jadotville, where he received the nickname "Serpent de Rail" after the just-completed rail line between Jadotville and Kolwezi. Kabamba played for Standard Liège in Belgium from 1959 to 1963.

Kabamba represented Congo-Kinshasa at the 1968 African Cup of Nations in Ethiopia, where he scored two goals (both coming in the match versus Congo-Brazzaville) in three group matches. He did not play in the semi-final or final as the national team won the continental title for the first time. At the time of the 1968 tournament, Kabamba was playing for CS Imana.
