= Noureddine Hachouf =

Algerian footballer (born 1940)

Personal information
- Full name: Noureddine Hachouf
- Date of birth: 10 May 1940 (age 86)
- Place of birth: Guelma, French Algeria
- Position: Forward

Senior career*
Years	Team	Apps	(Gls)
1959-1972	ES Guelma		(105)

International career
1965–1968	Algeria	17	(7)
- * Club domestic league appearances and goals

Noureddine Hachouf (Arabic: نور الدين حشوف) (born 10 May 1940) is a former Algerian international footballer. He has 20 caps and 9 goals for the Algeria national team and played at the 1968 African Cup of Nations.

He was top scorer of the Algerian Championnat National in the 1966–67 season with 18 goals while playing for ES Guelma.
