= 1968 African Cup of Nations =

6th edition of the Africa Cup of Nations

1968 የአፍሪካ ዋንጫ

Tournament details
- Host country: Ethiopia
- Dates: 12–21 January
- Teams: 8
- Venues: 2 (in 2 host cities)

Final positions
- Champions: Congo-Kinshasa (1st title)
- Runners-up: Ghana
- Third place: Ivory Coast
- Fourth place: Ethiopia

Tournament statistics
- Matches played: 16
- Goals scored: 52 (3.25 per match)
- Attendance: 209,000 (13,063 per match)
- Top scorer(s): (Ivory Coast) Laurent Pokou (6 goals)
- Best player: (Democratic Republic of the Congo) Kazadi Mwamba

The 1968 African Cup of Nations was the sixth edition of the African Cup of Nations, the international football championship run by the Confederation of African Football (CAF). It was hosted by Ethiopia. The field expanded to eight teams, split into two groups of four; the top two teams in each group advanced to the semifinals. Congo-Kinshasa won its first championship, beating Ghana in the final 1−0.

Prior to this tournament, the African Cup of Nations were held once every three years, following 1968 they were held once every two years.

== Qualified teams ==
Participating nations

The 8 qualified teams are:

Team	Qualified as	Qualified on	Previous appearances in tournament (Note: Bold indicates champion for that year, Italic indicates host.)
Ethiopia	Hosts		5 (1957, 1959, **1962**, 1963, 1965)
Ghana	Holders	21 November 1965	2 (**1963**, **1965**)
Algeria	Group 2 winners	9 April 1967	0 (debut)
Ivory Coast	Group 3 winners	7 May 1967	1 (1965)
Uganda	Group 4 winners	30 June 1967	1 (1962)
Congo-Brazzaville	Group 5 winners	17 September 1967	0 (debut)
Congo-Kinshasa	Group 6 winners	10 October 1967	1 (1965)
Senegal	Group 1 winners	22 November 1967	0 (debut)

== Venues ==
Addis Ababa
Hailé Sélassié Stadium
Capacity: **30,000**
Asmara
Cicero Stadium
Capacity: **20,000**

== Group stage ==
=== Tiebreakers ===
If two or more teams finished level on points after completion of the group matches, the following tie-breakers were used to determine the final ranking:

1. Goal difference in all group matches
2. Greater number of goals scored in all group matches
3. Drawing of lots

=== Group A ===
Pos	Team	Pld	W	D	L	GF	GA	GD	Pts	Qualification
1	Ethiopia (H)	3	3	0	0	6	2	+4	**6**	Advance to knockout stage
2	Ivory Coast	3	2	0	1	5	2	+3	**4**	Advance to knockout stage
3	Algeria	3	1	0	2	5	6	−1	**2**	
4	Uganda	3	0	0	3	2	8	−6	**0**	

Rules for classification: Group stage tiebreakers
(H) Hosts
12 January 1968

Ethiopia	2–1	Uganda
Asmerom; Vassalo (pen.)		Ouma

Hailé Sélassié Stadium, Addis Ababa
Attendance: 20,000
Referee: Ali Kandil (Egypt)
12 January 1968

Ivory Coast	3–0	Algeria
Bozon 15'; Pokou 25', 65'

Hailé Sélassié Stadium, Addis Ababa
Attendance: 20,000
Referee: Abdoul Latif Guèye (Senegal)

14 January 1968

Ethiopia	1–0	Ivory Coast
Bekuretsion 86'

Hailé Sélassié Stadium, Addis Ababa
Attendance: 25,000
Referee: Ahmed Gindil Saleh (Sudan)
14 January 1968

Algeria	4–0	Uganda
Lalmas 15', 25', 70'; Kalem 60'

Hailé Sélassié Stadium, Addis Ababa
Attendance: 25,000
Referee: Alphonse Mahombé (Congo-Kinshasa)

16 January 1968

Ivory Coast	2–1	Uganda
Pokou; Manglé		Obua

Hailé Sélassié Stadium, Addis Ababa
Attendance: 15,000
Referee: George Lamptey (Ghana)
16 January 1968

Ethiopia	3–1	Algeria
Worku 16'; Shewangizaw 19'; Vassalo 27' (pen.)		Amirouche 68'

Hailé Sélassié Stadium, Addis Ababa
Attendance: 20,000
Referee: Joseph Angaud (Congo-Brazzaville)

=== Group B ===
Pos	Team	Pld	W	D	L	GF	GA	GD	Pts	Qualification
1	Ghana	3	2	1	0	7	4	+3	**5**	Advance to knockout stage
2	Congo-Kinshasa	3	2	0	1	6	3	+3	**4**	Advance to knockout stage
3	Senegal	3	1	1	1	5	5	0	**3**	
4	Congo-Brazzaville	3	0	0	3	2	8	−6	**0**	

Rules for classification: Group stage tiebreakers
12 January 1968

Ghana	2–2	Senegal
Kofi 63'; Mfum 87'		Diongue 10'; Diop 65'

Cicero Stadium, Asmara
Attendance: 3,000
Referee: Ad-Diba (Egypt)
12 January 1968

Congo-Kinshasa	3–0	Congo-Brazzaville
Muwawa 19'; Kabamba 27' (pen.), 51'

Cicero Stadium, Asmara
Attendance: 4,000
Referee: Ahmed Khelifi (Algeria)

14 January 1968

Senegal	2–1	Congo-Brazzaville
Diop 27'; Diouck 86'		Foutika 31'

Cicero Stadium, Asmara
Attendance: 3,000
Referee: Ahmed Rajab (Uganda)
14 January 1968

Ghana	2–1	Congo-Kinshasa
Kofi 17' (pen.); Mfum 84'		Mokili 42'

Cicero Stadium, Asmara
Attendance: 3,000
Referee: Pierre Boua (Ivory Coast)

16 January 1968

Congo-Kinshasa	2–1	Senegal
Kidumu; Tshimanga (pen.)		Diouck

Cicero Stadium, Asmara
Attendance: 3,000
Referee: Seyoum Tarekegn (Ethiopia)
16 January 1968

Ghana	3–1	Congo-Brazzaville
Kofi; Mfum		M'Bono

Cicero Stadium, Asmara
Attendance: 3,000
Referee: Joseph Awanda (Kenya)

== Knockout stage ==
=== Bracket ===
Semi-finals
19 January – Addis Ababa
Ethiopia	2
**Congo-Kinshasa (a.e.t.)**	**3**
19 January – Asmara
**Ghana (a.e.t.)**	**4**
Ivory Coast	3

Final
21 January – Addis Ababa
**Congo-Kinshasa**	**1**
Ghana	0
Third place
21 January – Addis Ababa
**Ivory Coast**	**1**
Ethiopia	0

=== Semi-finals ===
19 January 1968

Ethiopia	2–3 (a.e.t.)	Congo-Kinshasa
Vassalo 25'; Worku 65'		Kidumu 3'; Mungamuni 16', 100'

Hailé Sélassié Stadium, Addis Ababa
Attendance: 25,000
Referee: Ali Kandil (Egypt)

19 January 1968

Ghana	4–3	Ivory Coast
Mfum; Sunday; Odoi	Report	Pokou; Konan (pen.)

Cicero Stadium, Asmara
Attendance: 5,000
Referee: Ad-Diba (Egypt)

=== Third place match ===
21 January 1968

Ivory Coast	1–0	Ethiopia
Pokou 28'

Hailé Sélassié Stadium, Addis Ababa
Attendance: 10,000
Referee: Ahmed Khelifi (Algeria)

=== Final ===
21 January 1968

Congo-Kinshasa	1–0	Ghana
Kalala 66'

Hailé Sélassié Stadium, Addis Ababa
Attendance: 25,000
Referee: Ad-Diba (Egypt)

== Goalscorers ==
There were 52 goals scored in 16 matches, for an average of 3.25 goals per match.

6 goals

- (Ivory Coast) Laurent Pokou

5 goals

- (Ghana) Wilberforce Mfum

4 goals

- (Ghana) Osei Kofi

3 goals

- (Algeria) Hacène Lalmas
- (Ethiopia) Luciano Vassalo

2 goals

- (Republic of the Congo) Jean "Jeannot" Foutika
- (Democratic Republic of the Congo) Nicodème Kabamba
- (Democratic Republic of the Congo) Kidumu Mantantu
- (Democratic Republic of the Congo) Léon Mungamuni
- (Senegal) Yatma Diop
- (Senegal) Yatma Diouck
- (Ethiopia) Mengistu Worku

1 goal

- (Algeria) Boualem Amirouche
- (Algeria) Mokhtar Kalem
- (Democratic Republic of the Congo) Ignace Muwawa
- (Democratic Republic of the Congo) Saio Ernest Mokili
- (Democratic Republic of the Congo) Pierre Kalala Mukendi
- (Democratic Republic of the Congo) Elias Tshimanga
- (Ivory Coast) Jean-Louis Bozon
- (Ivory Coast) Henri Konan
- (Ivory Coast) Eustache Manglé
- (Ethiopia) Bekuretsion Gebrehiwot
- (Ethiopia) Shewangizaw Agonafer
- (Ethiopia) Girma Tekle
- (Ghana) Frank Odoi
- (Ghana) Ibrahim Sunday
- (Senegal) Doudou Diongue
- (Uganda) Denis Obua
- (Uganda) Polly Ouma

== Team of the Tournament ==
Goalkeeper	Defenders	Midfielders	Forwards
(Democratic Republic of the Congo) Kazadi Mwamba	(Ivory Coast) Henri Konan (Ghana) Charles Addo Odametey (Senegal) Yérim Diagne (Senegal) Djibril Gueye	(Ethiopia) Luciano Vassallo (Ethiopia) Mengistu Worku (Algeria) Hacène Lalmas (Ivory Coast) Joseph Bléziri	(Ivory Coast) Laurent Pokou (Senegal) Doudou Diongue
