= 1943 in Argentina =

- Decades: 1920s; 1930s; 1940s; 1950s; 1960s
- See also: Other events of 1943; List of years in Argentina

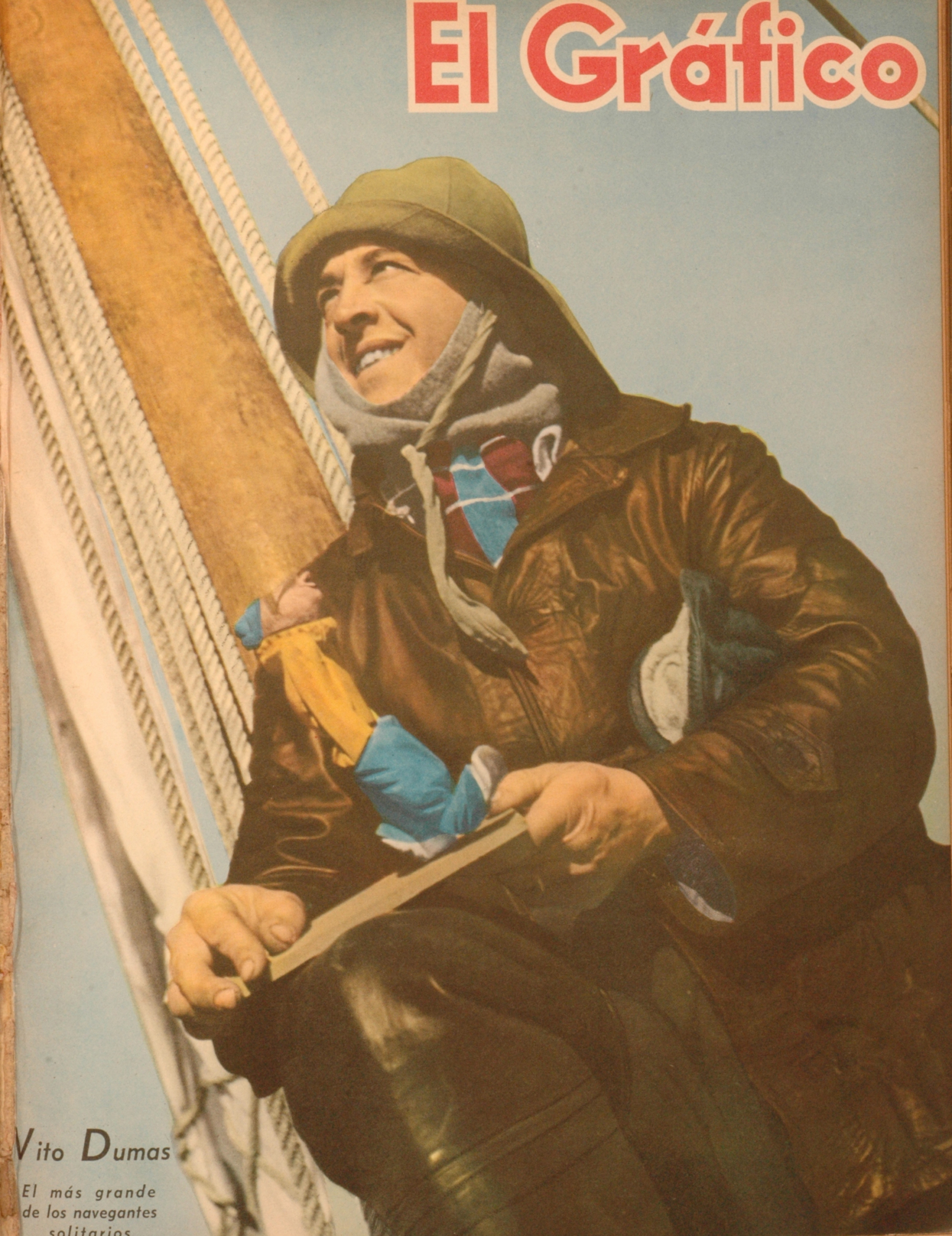

Events from the year 1943 in Argentina.

== Incumbents ==
- President: Ramón Castillo, Arturo Rawson, Pedro Pablo Ramírez
- Vice President: Sabá Sueyro, Edelmiro Julián Farrell

=== Governors ===
- Buenos Aires Province: Rodolfo Moreno, Edgardo J. Míguez, Oscar Cazalas (de facto), Armando Verdaguer, Faustino J. Legón
- Cordoba: Santiago del Castillo
- Mendoza Province: Adolfo Vicchi, Humberto Sosa Molina, Luis Elías Villanueva, Aristóbulo Vargas Belmonte

=== Vice Governors ===
- Buenos Aires Province: Edgardo J. Míguez (until 12 June); vacant thereafter (starting 12 June)

== Events ==
=== May ===
- The Radical Civic Union, the Socialist Party and the Democrat Progresist Party join forces to create the Democratic Union
- The CGT gets divided in two factions, led by J. Domenech and F. Pérez Leiroz

=== June ===
- Revolution of '43 – President Ramón Castillo is deposed by a military coup. Arturo Rawson takes the presidency, but he is removed immediately and replaced by Pedro Pablo Ramírez
- A laboral strike in Jujuy causes four deaths

=== August ===
- Laboral strike of the meat industry unions.

=== October ===
- Juan Domingo Perón signs the first collective laboral agreement
- Hugo Wast, ministry of education, outlaws lunfardo and forces many tango artists to rewrite the lyrics of their songs.

=== November ===
- Juan Domingo Perón is appointed for the Secretary of Labour and Welfare.
- Many communist leaders, as José Peter, are jailed.

=== Ongoing ===
- Argentina keeps a neutral stance in World War II, amid foreign pressure to join the war

== Births ==
- January 6 – Osvaldo Soriano, journalist and writer (died 1997)
- January 16 – Jorge Sobisch, politician
- February 9 – Santiago Soldati, entrepreneur
- March 4 – Aldo Rico, soldier and politician
- April 6 – Omar Vergara, Olympic fencer
- April 7 – Ángel Marcos, footballer
- April 8 – Víctor Bó, film actor and producer
- May 1 – Carlos Trillo, comic book writer (died 2011)
- May 24 – Héctor Aguer, Archbishop of La Plata
- May 30 – Víctor Laplace, actor
- June 5 – Hermes Binner, physician and politician
- June 14 – Jeanine Meerapfel, German-Argentine film director and screenwriter
- July 13
  - Carlos Borcosque Jr., film director and screenwriter
  - Juan Carlos Sconfianza, footballer
- July 23 – Hugo Arana, film, television and theatre actor
- August – Norberto Ceresole, sociologist and political scientist (died 2003)
- August 1 – Carlos Roffé, film and television actor (died 2005)
- August 2 – Emilio Disi, actor
- August 3 – Elio Roca, singer
- August 4 – Angel Balzarino, writer
- August 18 – Norma Pons, actress (died 2014)
- September 17 – Carlos Sampayo, writer
- October 6 – Luis Alberto, footballer
- October 18 – Andrej Bajuk, Slovene politician and economist brought up in Argentina (died 2011)
- October 19 – Adolfo Aristarain, film director and screenwriter
- November 1 – José Ignacio García Hamilton, writer, historian, lawyer and politician (died 2009)
- November 5 – Mariano Etkin, composer
- November 6 – Roberto Telch, footballer
- November 12 – Claudio Slon, jazz drummer (died 2002)
- November 16
  - Juan Giménez, comic book artist
  - Rodolfo Terragno, politician, lawyer and journalist
- November 18 – Leonardo Sandri, Roman Catholic cardinal
- November 25 – Dante Caputo, academic, diplomat and politician
- December 6 – Miguel Lunghi, politician
- December 12 – Miguel Ángel Raimondo, footballer
- date unknown
  - Guillermo Vargas Aignasse, politician (disappeared 1976)
  - Liliana Heker, writer
  - Carlos Santiago Nino, philosopher (died 1993)
  - Horacio Vaggione, composer
  - Barylka Yerahmiel, rabbi, educator, journalist and lecturer

== Deaths ==
- January 11 – Agustín Pedro Justo, President of Argentina 1932–1938 (born 1876)
- January 29 – José A. Ferreyra, film director and screenwriter (born 1889)
- August 24 – Antonio Alice, painter (born 1886)
- October 15 - Sabá Sueyro, politician (born 1876)
- October 25 - Hubert Duggan, Argentine-born British soldier and politician (born 1904; tuberculosis)
- December 7 – Collier Twentyman Smithers, Argentine-born British painter (born 1867)

== See also ==
- List of Argentine films of 1943

== Bibliography ==
- Romero, Luis Alberto (2010). 1940–1949. Buenos Aires: Clarín. ISBN 978-987-07-0874-2.
