= 1940 in Argentina =

- Decades: 1920s; 1930s; 1940s; 1950s; 1960s
- See also: Other events of 1940; List of years in Argentina

Events from the year 1940 in Argentina

== Incumbents ==
- President: Roberto María Ortiz (UCR-A – Concordancia)
- Vice President: Ramón Castillo

=== Governors ===
- Buenos Aires Province:
  - until 7 March: Manuel Fresco
  - 7 March-13 March: Luis Cassinelli
  - 13 March-27 May: Octavio R. Amadeo
  - 27 May-4 June: Carlos Herrera
  - from 4 June: Octavio R. Amadeo
- Cordoba: Amadeo Sabattini then Santiago del Castillo
- Mendoza Province: Rodolfo Corominas Segura

=== Vice Governors ===
- Buenos Aires Province: Aurelio Amodeo (until 7 March); vacant thereafter (starting 7 March)

== Events ==
=== February ===
- Intervention of the Catamarca Province

=== March ===
- Intervention of the Buenos Aires province

=== June ===
- President Ortiz takes leave from work because of diabetes

=== August ===
- Construction of the first airplane made in Argentina, a curtiss 75
- Ortiz, during his leave from work, offers his resignation to the Congress amid a political controversy. The Congress does not accept it.

=== November ===
- The Congress discusses a proposal for economic reactivation made by minister Federico Pinedo

=== December ===
- Juan Tonazzi is appointed minister of War. He rearranges the top military personnel, promoting supporters of Agustín Pedro Justo

=== Date unknown ===
- Radio El Mundo starts the radio drama Los Pérez García, which would last up to 1969

=== Ongoing ===
- Argentina keeps a neutral stance in World War II, amid foreign pressure to join the war

== Births ==
- April 9 - Chunchuna Villafañe, model, actress and architect
- April 30 - Ermindo Onega, footballer (died 1979)
- May 15 - Carlos Bielicki, chess master
- July 7 - Dora Baret, actress
- August 17 - Eduardo Mignogna, film director and screenwriter (died 2006)
- September 24 - Amelita Baltar, tango singer
- October 17 - Carlos Heller, executive, cooperative banking leader, and politician
- November 18 - Susana Ruiz Cerutti, lawyer and politician (died 2024)
- date unknown
  - Cacho Espíndola, actor
  - Alicia Dujovne Ortiz, journalist* Esteban Courtalon
- Esther Norma Arrostito
- Graciela Paraskevaidis
- Guillermo José Garlatti
- Guillermo Saucedo
- Gustavo Bergalli
- Horacio Usandizaga
- Jesús Taboada
- Jorge Ginarte
- Jorge Kissling
- José Rubinstein
- Juan Carlos Maccarone
- Juan Paletta
- Juan Rosai
- Leonardo Henrichsen
- Luis Brandoni
- Luis Cubilla
- Maria Teresa Luengo
- Mario Acuña
- María Cristina Laurenz
- Miguel Ángel Loayza
- Nacha Guevara
- Nestor Combin
- Osvaldo Lamborghini
- Osvaldo Álvarez Guerrero
- Raúl Zaffaroni
- Roberto Matosas
- Rodolfo Mederos
- Román Quinos
- Silvio Marzolini
- Wálter Machado da Silva

== Deaths ==
- Enrique Mosconi
- Manuel Musto

== See also ==
- List of Argentine films of 1940

== Bibliography ==
- Romero, Luis Alberto (2010). 1940-1949. Buenos Aires: Clarín. ISBN 978-987-07-0874-2.
