= 1942 in Argentina =

- Decades: 1920s; 1930s; 1940s; 1950s; 1960s
- See also: Other events of 1942; List of years in Argentina

Events from the year 1942 in Argentina

== Incumbents ==
- President: Roberto María Ortiz (officially up to June 26), Ramón Castillo (acting up to June 26, officially since then)
- Vice President: Ramón Castillo (up to June 26)

=== Governors ===
- Buenos Aires Province:
  - Dimas González Gowland (up to January 7)
  - Rodolfo Moreno (from January 7)
- Cordoba: Santiago del Castillo
- Mendoza Province: Adolfo Vicchi

=== Vice Governors ===
- Buenos Aires Province:
  - Vacant (until 7 January)
  - Edgardo J. Míguez (from 7 January)

== Events ==
=== March ===
- The Concordancia wins the national elections for deputies in most provinces. The Socialist party prevails in Buenos Aires, and the UCR in Corrientes and Tucuman
- Corrientes and Tucuman are intervened

=== June ===
- Roberto Ortiz, ill of diabetes, resigns as president. Ramón Castillo, acting president since 1941, becomes official president.
- The chamber of deputies votes to break relations with Nazi Germany, the chamber of senators does not discuss the project.

=== August ===
- Gillette and Helena Rubinstein start working in the country

=== October ===
- The port of Rosario is nationalized
- Gaseoduct La Plata-Buenos Aires

=== December ===
- Agustín Pedro Justo announces his intention to run for the presidency.

=== Ongoing ===
- Argentina keeps a neutral stance in World War II, amid foreign pressure to join the war

== Births ==
=== January ===
- January 1 – Lita Stantic, film director, producer and screenwriter
- January 22 – Juan Carlos Sarnari, footballer

=== February ===
- February 10 – Roberto Aguirre, footballer
- February 11 – Horacio Verbitsky, investigative journalist
- February 27 – Miguel Ángel Santoro, footballer

=== March ===
- March 4 – Juan Carlos Oleniak, footballer
- March 22 – Leo Dan, composer and singer
- March 24 – Roberto Lavagna, economist and politician
- April 12 – Carlos Reutemann, racing driver and politician
- April 27 – Carlos Enrique Gavito, tango dancer
- April 29 – Horacio Iglesias, swimmer (died 2004)
- May 6 – Ariel Dorfman, Argentine-Chilean novelist, playwright, essayist, academic, and human rights activist
- May 13 – Adolfo Bisellach, Olympic fencer
- May 18 – Juan Carlos Carone, footballer
- May 23 – José Omar Pastoriza, footballer (died 2004)
- May 25 – Marcos Mundstock, musician and comedian
- June 11 – Cacho Castaña, singer and actor
- June 27 – Jérôme Savary, Argentine-French theatre director and actor (died 2013)
- July 10
  - Francisco Escos, footballer
  - José Antonio Muñoz, artist
- July 19 – Agustín Irusta, footballer
- August 7 – Carlos Monzón, boxer (died 1995)
- August 13 - Jorge Altamira, politician
- September 1 - Daniel Willington, footballer
- September 8 - Marcelo Sánchez Sorondo, Roman Catholic bishop
- September 25 - Oscar Bonavena, boxer (died 1976)
- October 3
  - Roberto Perfumo, footballer
  - Margherita Zimmermann, operatic mezzo-soprano
- October 8 – María Julia Alsogaray, politician
- October 15 – Carlos Núñez Cortés, musician
- November 8 – Fernando Sorrentino, writer
- November 15 – Daniel Barenboim, pianist and conductor
- November 19 – Moris, rock musician
- November 27 – Néstor Togneri, footballer (died 1999)
- December 9 – Marcos Conigliaro, football player and coach
- December 12 – Guillermo Jaim Etcheverry, physician and academic
- date unknown
  - Pocho Lapouble, jazz musician (died 2009)
  - Beatriz Sarlo, literary and cultural critic.
  - Oscar Zarate, comic book artist and illustrator

== Deaths ==
- March 23 – Marcelo Torcuato de Alvear, politician (born 1868)
- May 3 – Elías Isaac Alippi, actor, director and impresario (born 1883)
- June 3 – Vicente Gallo, lawyer, academic and politician (born 1873)
- July 15 – Roberto María Ortiz, politician (born 1886; diabetes)
- July 20 – Julio Salvador Sagreras, guitarist and composer (born 1879)
- July 26 – Roberto Arlt, writer (born 1900)
- August 31 – Teddie Gerard, actress and entertainer (born 1890; lung infection)
- September 23 – Alfredo Carricaberry, footballer (born 1900)
- October 8 – Julio Argentino Pascual Roca, politician and diplomat (born 1873)

== See also ==
- List of Argentine films of 1942

== Bibliography ==
- Romero, Luis Alberto (2010). 1940-1949. Buenos Aires: Clarín. ISBN 978-987-07-0874-2.
