= 1944 in Argentina =

- Decades: 1920s; 1930s; 1940s; 1950s; 1960s
- See also: Other events of 1944; List of years in Argentina

Events from the year 1944 in Argentina.

== Incumbents ==
- President: Pedro Pablo Ramírez (until 25 February); Edelmiro Julián Farrell (from 25 February)
- Vice president: vacant (until 8 July); Juan Perón (from 8 July)

=== Governors ===
- Buenos Aires Province:
  - until 5 January: Faustino J. Legón
  - 5 January-5 May: Julio O. Ojea
  - 5 May-19 July: Luis García Mata
  - 19 July-27 December: Juan Carlos Sanguinetti
  - from 27 December: Roberto M. Vanetta
- Mendoza Province: Aristóbulo Vargas Belmonte

=== Vice Governors ===
- Buenos Aires Province: vacant

== Events ==
=== January ===
- 15 January – 1944 San Juan earthquake, produces nearly 7000 deaths, 12000 injured and destroyed the 90% of building in the city
- 22 January – Juan Perón and Eva Perón met during a fundraising for the aforementioned earthquake.

=== February ===
- Pedro Ramírez resigns as president, being replaced by Edelmiro Farrell

=== March ===
- Bernardo Houssay, Juan Lewis and Eduardo Menendez establish the Instituto de Biología y Medicina Experimental

=== June ===
- Juan Perón is appointed vice president.
- The United States and Britain remove their ambassadors from Argentina.

=== August ===
- The United States confiscate Argentine gold located in the US, and forbid commerce with Argentina.

=== October ===
- Sanction of the Rural laborer statute

=== November ===
- 16 November: First issue of the Rico Tipo comic book

=== Ongoing ===
- Argentina keeps a neutral stance in World War II, amid foreign pressure to join the war

== Births ==
- 9 May – Paulina Vinderman, poet and translator
- 2 July – Vicente de la Mata, footballer
- 25 September – Susana Viau, journalist
- date unknown – Susana Giménez, model, actress and TV presenter

== Deaths ==
- 15 November - Cayetano Santos Godino, serial killer (born 1896)

== See also ==
- List of Argentine films of 1944

== Bibliography ==
- Romero, Luis Alberto (2010). 1940-1949. Buenos Aires: Clarín. ISBN 978-987-07-0874-2.
