= 1941 in Argentina =

- Decades: 1920s; 1930s; 1940s; 1950s; 1960s
- See also: Other events of 1941; List of years in Argentina

Events from the year 1941 in Argentina

== Incumbents ==
- President: Roberto María Ortiz (officially), Ramón Castillo (acting)
- Vice president: Ramón Castillo

=== Governors ===
- Buenos Aires Province:
  - until 1 February: Octavio R. Amadeo
  - 1 February-10 February: Eduardo T. López
  - 10 February-1 September: Eleazar Videla
  - 1 September-13 September: Enrique Rottjer
  - starting 13 September: Dimas González Gowland
- Cordoba: Santiago del Castillo
- Mendoza Province: Rodolfo Corominas Segura (until 18 February); Adolfo Vicchi (from 18 February)

=== Vice Governors ===
- Buenos Aires Province: vacant

== Events ==
=== January ===
- The UCR does not support in the Congress the proposal of the Minister of the Economy, Federico Pinedo, who resigns.

=== February ===
- President Roberto Ortiz, during leave from work because of diabetes, condemns the electoral fraud promoted by his vice president and acting president, Ramón Castillo.

=== March ===
- The fourth Mar del Plata chess tournament is held in Mar del Plata.

=== June ===
- June 4 - Premiere of the Los martes, orquídeas film, first film featuring Mirtha Legrand

=== July ===
- July 5 - The Avenida General Paz freeway is opened to traffic.
- July 12 - The Cathedral of Tucuman is declared a National Historic Monument.

=== September ===
- A coup attempt fails. General Zuloaga, from the air forces, is demoted.

=== October ===
- October 9 - Creation of the Dirección General de Fabricaciones Militares.
- New military rebellion, requesting the demotion of general Agustín Pedro Justo
- Creation of the National Geographic Institute

=== November ===
- November 23 - The Buenos Aires Grand Prix is held at the Circuito Retiro, and is won by José Canziani.

=== December ===
- Conservative candidate Rodolfo Moreno prevails in the elections in Buenos Aires. The opposition denounces electoral fraud.
- River Plate wins the 1941 Argentine Primera División tournament.

=== Date unknown ===
- Uruguayan architect Mauricio Cravotto wins a competition for the master plan for the city of Mendoza.

=== Ongoing ===
- Argentina keeps a neutral stance in World War II, amid foreign pressure to join the war.

== Births ==
=== January ===
- January 1 – Dardo Cabo, journalist and activist (died c.1977)
- January 22 – Sergio Calligaris, pianist and composer

=== February ===
- February 5 – Juan Carlos Morrone, footballer and manager
- February 6 – Guillermo Obeid, Olympic fencer

=== March ===
- March 8 – Palito Ortega, singer and actor
- March 9 – Antonio Gasalla, actor, comedian, and theatre director

=== May ===
- May 14 – Lito Cruz, stage director and motion picture actor
- May 27 – Jorge Eduardo Acosta, naval officer involved in the "Dirty War"

=== June ===
- June 5 - Martha Argerich, pianist
- June 10 -
  - Oscar Bony, artist (died 2002)
  - Graciela Borges, actress
  - Enrique Liporace, actor

=== July ===
- July 14 – León Najnudel, basketball player and coach (died 1998)
- July 15 – Rodolfo Enrique Fogwill, sociologist and writer (died 2010)

=== August ===
- August 4 – Aníbal Tarabini, footballer (died 1997)
- August 20 – Luisa Peluffo, journalist
- August 23 – Rafael Albrecht, footballer

=== September ===
- September 15 – Mario Paolucci, actor (died 2008)
- September 28 – Juan José Jusid, film director and screenwriter

=== October ===
- October 5 – Eduardo Duhalde, businessman
- October 9 – Alfredo Coto, businessman
- October 18 – Enrique Gorriarán Merlo, guerrilla insurgency leader (died 2006)
- October 24 – Lilia Lardone, writer (died 2026)
- October 28 – Pacho O'Donnell, writer, politician and physician

=== November ===
- November 4 -
  - Raúl Bernao, footballer (died 2007)
  - Carlos Espósito, football referee
- November 11 – Jorge Solari, football player and manager
- November 24 -
  - Horacio Altuna, comic artist
  - Ricardo Piglia, writer
- November 30 – León Arslanián, lawyer, jurist and public official

=== December ===
- December 4 – Raul Blanco, football coach
- December 16 – Poldy Bird, writer
- December 17 – Thelma Biral, actress
- December 25 – Rómulo Antonio Braschi, Roman Catholic bishop
- date unknown
  - Néstor Braunstein, psychiatrist
  - Guillermo Calvo, economist
  - David Graiver, businessman and banker (died 1976)
  - Antonio Ottone, film director, screenwriter and film producer (died 2002)
  - Liliana Porter, artist

== Deaths ==
=== August ===
- August 13 - Agustín Bardi, tango musician (born 1884)
- August 14 - Luis delle Piane, civil engineer, militarist and politician (born 1865)

=== September ===
- September 14 - Juan Bautista Bailoretto, outlaw (born 1894; shot in police ambush)

=== December ===
- December 29 - Rómulo Sebastián Naón, lawyer, politician and diplomat (born 1875)

== See also ==
- List of Argentine films of 1941

== Bibliography ==
- Romero, Luis Alberto (2010). 1940-1949. Buenos Aires: Clarín. ISBN 978-987-07-0874-2.
