= Luisa Valenzuela =

Argentine writer

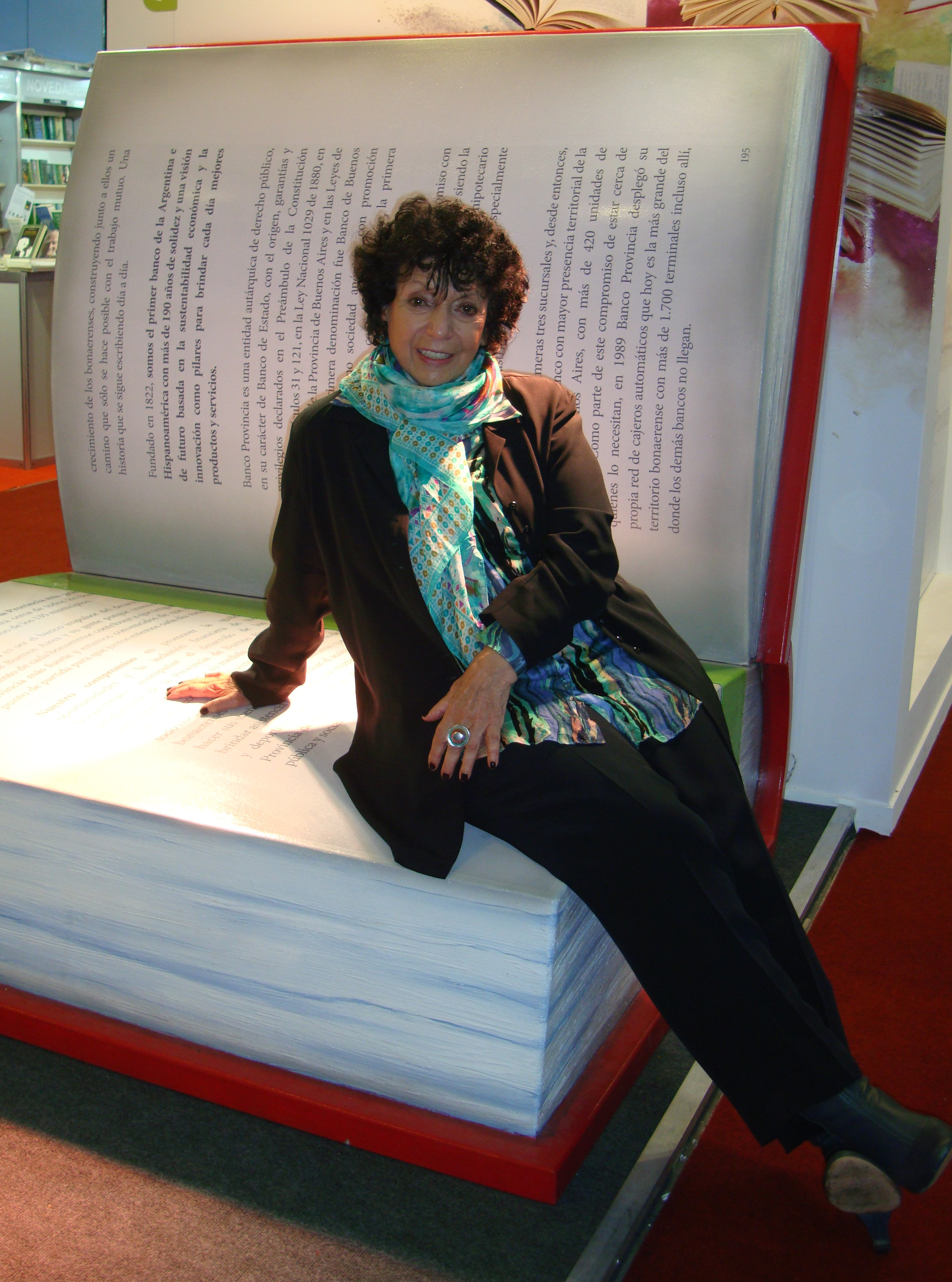
Luisa Valenzuela at the Buenos Aires Book Fair 2017

Luisa Valenzuela Levinson (born 26 November 1938) is an Argentine post-'Boom' novelist and short story writer. Her writing is characterized by an experimental style which questions hierarchical social structures from a feminist perspective.

She may be best-known for her work written in response to the dictatorship of the 1970s in Argentina. Works such as Como en la guerra (1977), Cambio de armas (1982) and Cola de lagartija (1983) combine a powerful critique of dictatorship with an examination of patriarchal forms of social organization and the power structures which inhere in human sexuality and gender relationships.

== Biography ==
Luisa Valenzuela Levinson was born and raised in Buenos Aires, Argentina, on 26 November 1938, to Pablo Francisco Valenzuela, a physician, and to writer Luisa Mercedes Levinson.

At the family home, various writers gathered such as Adolfo Bioy Casares, Jorge Luis Borges, and Ernesto Sabato. Though she felt an interest in natural sciences from an early age, at 17 she began publishing in several newspapers, such as Atlántida, El Hogar and Esto Es, and worked for Radio Belgrano, as well.

At 20, just barely married to Theodore Marjak, a French merchant marine, she moved to Paris where she worked for Radio Télévision Française, and met members of both the nouveau roman literary movement and Tel Quel. She published her first fiction work entitled Clara (Hay que sonreír), whose main character would give its name to the title of the book of both English and French translations. In 1958, Luisa Valenzuela gave birth to her daughter, Anna-Lisa Marjak.

In 1961, she moved back to Argentina, where she worked as a journalist for La Nación and Crisis magazine. In 1965 she got divorced. During 1967 and 1968 she traveled throughout Bolivia, Peru and Brazil working for La Nación.

In 1969, she obtained the Fulbright Scholarship to study at the University of Iowa where she wrote The Efficient Cat (El gato eficaz). Between 1972 and 1974 she lived in Mexico City, Paris and Barcelona, with a brief stay in New York, where she researched the expression of the marginal United States literature as a recipient of the scholarship awarded by Argentina's National Fund for the Arts (Fondo Nacional de las Artes). As a consequence of the National Reorganization Process, that partially censored her novel He Who Searches (Como en la guerra) by removing a torture scene, she moved to the United States where she lived for ten years. There she published in 1982 her short fiction book Change of Guard (Cambio de armas) and in 1983 The Lizard's Tail (Cola de lagartija), a novel about José López Rega, Minister of Social Welfare during Isabel Perón's presidency that was supposed to be originally titled as Red Ant Sorcerer, Lord of Tacurú and Her Sister Estrella (El Brujo Hormiga Roja, Señor del Tacurú y su Hermana Estrella).

Luisa Valenzuela was a Resident Writer at the Center for Interamerican Relations at New York and Columbia University, where she taught writing workshops and seminars for ten years. She was a member of the New York Institute for the Humanities, at the Fund for Free Expression and member of the Freedom to Write Committee of the PEN American Center. In 1983 she was awarded the Guggenheim Scholarship. In 1989 she returned to Buenos Aires, where she finished her fiction works National Reality from Bed (Realidad nacional desde la cama), conceived initially as a play but finished as a novel and Black novel with Argentines (Novela negra con argentinos) that originally was meant to bear the title of The Motive (El motivo).

== Awards ==
- 1969 Fulbright Scholarship (International Writing Program, University of Iowa)
- 1972 Scholarship of Argentine "Fondo Nacional de las Artes" for investigations in New York City
- 1981/82 Fellow of the Institute for the Humanities of New York University
- 1983 Guggenheim-Scholarship
- 1985 Distinguished Writer in Residence at New York University
- Honorary Doctor of University of Knox, Illinois
- 1997 Medal "Machado de Assis" of Academia Brasilera de Letras
- 2004 Premio Astralba (University of Puerto Rico)
- 2011 Elected Foreign Honorary Member of the American Academy of Arts and Sciences
- 2016 Gran Premio de Honor de la SADE
- 2017 Honorary Doctor of Universidad Nacional de San Martín, Argentina

== Works ==
=== Novels ===
==== Spanish ====
- Hay que sonreír. Buenos Aires: Editorial Americalee, 1966. (CD-Rom: Buenos Aires, Ediciones La Margarita Digital, 2004).
- El gato eficaz. México: Ediciones Joaquín Mortíz, 1972. (reprints: Buenos Aires: Ediciones de la Flor, 1991, 2001). ISBN 950-515-123-3
- Como en la guerra. Buenos Aires: Sudamericana, 1977. (reprints: La Habana: Ediciones Casa de las Américas, 2001).
- Cola de lagartija. Buenos Aires: Editorial Bruguera, 1983. (reprints: México: Difusión Cultural, UNAM, 1992. México: Planeta, 1998). ISBN 950-561-038-6
- Realidad nacional desde la cama. Buenos Aires: Grupo Editor Latinoamericano, 1990, 1993. ISBN 950-694-127-0
- Novela negra con argentinos. Barcelona: Ed. Plaza y Janés, 1990. (reprints: Hanover (N.H.): Ediciones del Norte, 1990. Buenos Aires: Editorial Sudamericana, 1991). ISBN 84-01-38171-1 ISBN 9500706695 ISBN 0-910061-44-0
- La Travesía. Buenos Aires: Editorial Norma, 2001. (reprints: Editorial Alfaguara, México, 2002, Bogotá 2002). ISBN 987-545-026-X ISBN 9580465916
- El Mañana. Buenos Aires: Editorial Seix Barral, 2010.
- Cuidado con el tigre. Buenos Aires: Editorial Seix Barral, 2011.
- La máscara sarda, el profundo secreto de Perón. Buenos Aires: Editorial Seix Barral, 2012.

==== English ====
- Clara (the novel). Latin American Literary Review/Press, USA 1999.
- The Lizard's Tail (a novel). Farrar, Straus and Giroux, USA 1983. (reprint: Serpent's Tail, England 1987). ISBN 0-374-18994-3
- He Who Searches (a novel). Dalkey Archive Press, USA 1986.
- Black Novel (with Argentines). Simon & Schuster. USA 1992. (reprint: Allen & Unwin, Australia 1992. Latin American Literary Review Press, USA 2001). ISBN 0-671-68764-6 ISBN 1891270133
- Bedside Manners (a novel). Serpent's Tail/High Risk. USA, 1995. (reprint: Serpent's Tail, UK, 1995). ISBN 1-85242-313-7

=== Short stories ===
- Papito's Story.

==== Spanish ====
- Los heréticos. Buenos Aires: Editorial Paidós, 1967.
- Aquí pasan cosas raras. Buenos Aires: Ediciones de la Flor, 1975 and 1991.
- Libro que no muerde. México: Difusión Cultural, UNAM, 1980.
- Cambio de armas. Ediciones del Norte, Hanover, 1982. (reprints: México: Martín Casilla Editores, 1982. Buenos Aires: Editorial Norma, 2004).
- Donde viven las águilas. Buenos Aires: Editorial Celtia, 1983. ISBN 950-9106-29-1
- Simetrías. Buenos Aires: Ed. Sudamericana, 1993. (reprint: Barcelona: Ed. Plaza y Janés, 1997). ISBN 950-07-0899-X
- Antología personal. Buenos Aires: Ediciones Desde la Gente, 1998. ISBN 950-860-069-1
- Cuentos completos y uno más. México / Buenos Aires: Alfaguara, 1999, 2001. ISBN 968-19-0509-1
- Simetrías/Cambio de Armas (Luisa Valenzuela y la crítica). Valencia: Ediciones ExCultura, 2002.
- El placer rebelde. Antología general. Prólogo y selección de Guillermo Saavedra. Buenos Aires, México: Fondo de Cultura Económica, 2003. ISBN 950-557-575-0
- Microrrelatos completos hasta hoy. Córdoba (Arg.): Editorial Alción, 2004.
- Trilogía de los bajos fondos (Hay que sonreír, Como en la guerra, Novela negra con argentinos). México: Fondo de Cultura Económica, 2004.

==== English ====
- Clara, 13 short stories and a novel. Harcourt, Brace and Jovanovich, USA 1976. ISBN 1-891270-09-5
- Strange Things Happen Here. 19 short stories and a novel. Harcourt, Brace and Jovanovich, USA 1979. ISBN 0-15-185782-2
- Other Weapons. Ediciones del Norte/Persea Books, USA 1985. ISBN 0-910061-22-X
- Open Door (selected short stories). North Point Press, USA 1988. (Neuere Ausgabe: Serpent's Tail. England 1992). ISBN 0-86547-310-2
- The Censors (selected short stories, bilingual edition). Curbstone Press, USA 1992. ISBN 0-915306-12-3
- Symmetries (short stories). Serpent's Tail/High Risk. USA & England 1998. ISBN 1-85242-543-1
- "A family for Clotilde", in Wendy Martin, The art of short story. USA: Houghton Mifflin Company, 2006.
- "Blind dates", in Pretext, Number 11, London 2005.

=== Essays ===
==== Spanish ====
- Peligrosas Palabras. Buenos Aires: Editorial Temas, 2001. (reprint: México: Editorial Océano, 2002). ISBN 987-9164-54-7
- Escritura y Secreto. México: Editorial Ariel, 2002. (reprint: México: Fondo de Cultura Económica, 2003). ISBN 84-375-0534-8
- Los deseos oscuros y los otros (cuadernos de New York). Buenos Aires: Ed. Norma, 2002. ISBN 987-545-079-0

== Bibliography and sources ==
- The Review of Contemporary Fiction, Luisa Valenzuela number. The Dalkey Archive Press, USA, Fall 1986.
- Magnarelli, Sharon: Reflections/Refractions, Reading Luisa Valenzuela. New York/Frankfurt: Peter Lang, 1988.
- Cordones-Cook, Juana María: Poética de la transgresión en la novelística de Luisa Valenzuela. New York/Frankfurt: Peter Lang, 1991.
- Martínez, Z. Nelly: El silencio que habla: aproximación a la obra de Luisa Valenzuela. Buenos Aires: Ediciones Corregidor, 1994.
- World Literature Today: Focus on Luisa Valenzuela. Oklahoma University Press, USA, Autumn 1995.
- Kantaris, Elia Geoffrey: The Subversive Psyche: Contemporary Women's Narrative from Argentina and Uruguay. Oxford: Oxford University Press, 1995.
- The Best of Review: Celebrating the Americas Society's 40th Anniversary, editors Tess O'Dwyer and Doris Sommer, Routledge, Francis & Taylor, London, 2005.
- Díaz, Gwendolyn / Lagos, María Inés et al.: La palabra en vilo: narrativa de Luisa Valenzuela. Santiago de Chile: Editorial Cuarto Propio, 1996.
- Cuerpos errantes: literatura latina y latinoamericana, Laura R. Loustau, Beatriz Viterbo Editora, 2002.
- Pfeiffer, Erna: Territorium Frau: Körpererfahrung als Erkenntnisprozess in Texten zeitgenössischer lateinamerikanischer Autorinnen. Frankfurt: Vervuert, 1998.
- Letras Femeninas (special issue Luisa Valenzuela), vol. XXVII, Nº 1. Hg. Juanamaría Cordones-Cook. Madison (WI), 2001.
- Casa de la Américas. Semana de Luisa Valenzuela, Nº 226. La Habana, enero/febrero 2002.
- Luisa Valenzuela: Simetrías/Cambio de armas. Luisa Valenzuela y la crítica. Ediciones ExCultura (España), 2002.
- Díaz, Gwendolyn (ed.): Luisa Valenzuela sin máscara. Buenos Aires, Feminaria Editora, 2002.
- Bilbija, Ksenia: Yo soy trampa. Ensayos sobre la obra de Luisa Valenzuela. Buenos Aires, Feminaria Editora, 2003.
