= Paulina Vinderman =

Argentine poet and translator

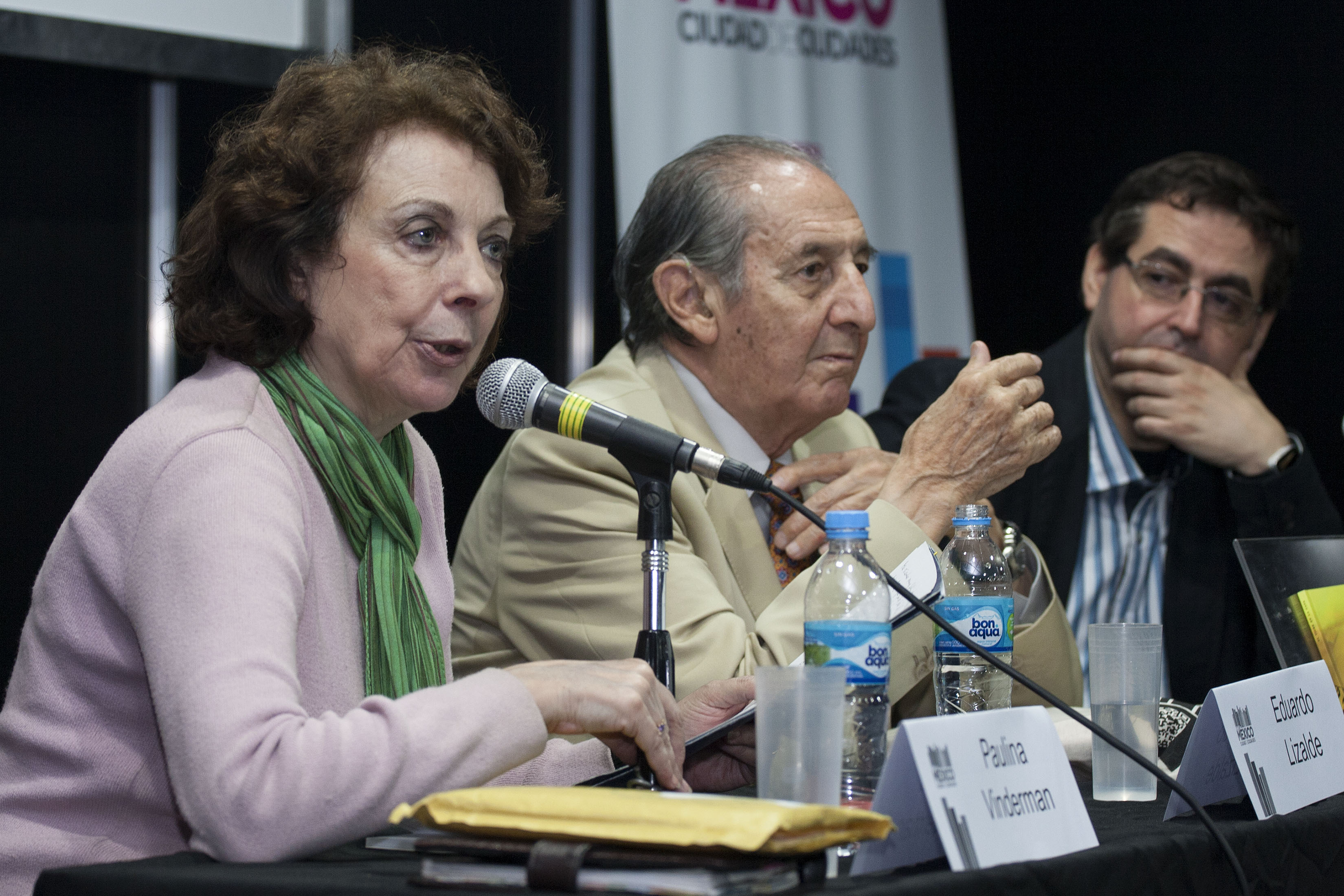
- Born: 9 May 1944 (age 82); Buenos Aires, Argentina
- Education: University of Buenos Aires
- Occupations: Poet, translator

Paulina Vinderman (born 9 May 1944) is an Argentine poet and translator.

== Career ==
Paulina Vinderman has participated in international poetry festivals such as those of Granada (2013) and Medellín. Her work has been included in numerous anthologies, and many of her poems have been translated into English, Italian and German. She has contributed to publications of Buenos Aires and Hispano-America with poems, articles, and literary reviews, among them La Nación, La Prensa, Clarín, Diario de Poesía, and Intramuros. She published in Feminaria, a feminist theory journal that was published from 1988 to 2008. Among the Hispano-American publications are El Espectador (Colombia), Hora de Poesía (Spain), Babel (Venezuela), and Hispamérica (United States). She participated in the workshop cycle "La Pluma y la Palabra", organized by the Society of Writers of Argentina, on the theme of poetry (7 July 2006).

Vinderman has translated works by John Oliver Simon, Emily Dickinson, Michael Ondaatje, Sylvia Plath, and James Merrill into Spanish.

She is a graduate of Biochemistry at the University of Buenos Aires, a field that she practiced in for some years.

== Selected publications ==
- La mirada de los héroes (1st ed.). Ediciones Botella al Mar S.R.L. 1982. ISBN 978-950-513-002-3.
- La balada de Cordelia (1st ed.). Fundación Argentina para la Poesía. 1984. ISBN 978-950-9161-12-2.
- Rojo junio (1st ed.). Literatura Americana Reunida - L.A.R. Ediciones. 1988. ISBN 978-950-99206-0-6.
- Escalera de incendio (1st ed.). Último Reino. 1994. ISBN 978-950-804-025-1.
- Bulgaria (1st ed.). Libros de Alejandría. 1998. ISBN 978-987-99653-7-5.
- Cónsul honoraria, antología personal (1st ed.). Vinciguerra. 2003. ISBN 978-950-843-514-9.
- El muelle (1st ed.). Alción Editora. 2003. ISBN 978-987-1359-55-4.
- Hospital de veteranos (1st ed.). Alción Editora. 2006. ISBN 978-987-1359-42-4.
- El vino del atardecer (1st ed.). El Suri Porfiado Ediciones. 2008. ISBN 978-987-23987-9-8.
- Bote negro (1st ed.). Alción Editora. 2010. ISBN 978-987-646-138-2.
- La epigrafista (1st ed.). Hilos Editora. 2012. ISBN 978-987-25844-9-8.
- Rojo junio y otros poemas (1st ed.). Ruinas Circulares. 2013. ISBN 978-987-1610-97-6.
- Ciruelo (1st ed.). Alción Editora. 2014. ISBN 978-987-646-432-1.
- Cuaderno de dibujo (1st ed.). Alción Editora. 2016. ISBN 978-987-646-639-4.

== Awards ==
- Second and Third Municipal Prize of Buenos Aires (1998–99 and 1988–89 respectively)
- National Regional Award of the Secretary of Culture (1993–96)
- 2002 Gold Letters Award of the Honorarte Foundation
- First Municipal Prize of Buenos Aires (2002–2003)
- Literary Award of the Academia Argentina de Letras, Poetry genre, 2004–2006
- 2002 and 2005 Fondo Nacional de las Artes Awards
- 2006 Anillo del Arte Award for Notable Women
- 2006 Citta' di Cremona Award
- 2007 Municipal Poetry Prize
