= 1890 in Argentina =

- Decades: 1870s; 1880s; 1890s; 1900s; 1910s
- See also: Other events of 1890; List of years in Argentina

Events in the year 1890 in Argentina.

== Incumbents ==
- President: Miguel Ángel Juárez Celman until August 6, Carlos Pellegrini
- Vice President: Carlos Pellegrini until August 6, then vacant

=== Governors ===
- Buenos Aires Province: Dardo Rocha
- Cordoba: Marcos Juárez then Eleazar Garzón
- Mendoza Province: Domingo Bombal (until 10 June); Oseas Guiñazú (from 10 June)
- Santa Fe Province: José Gálvez then Juan Manuel Cafferata

=== Vice Governors ===
- Buenos Aires Province: Claudio Stegmann (until 1 May); Víctor del Carril (starting 1 May)

== Events ==
- July 26 - Revolution of the Park

== Births ==
- May 2 - Teddie Gerard, actress and entertainer (d. 1942)
