= Guillermo Jaim Etcheverry =

Argentine physician (born 1942)

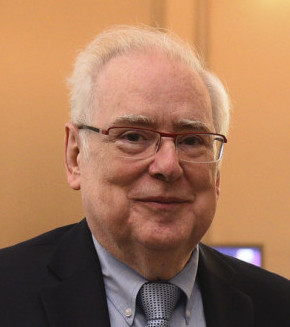
Guillermo Jaim Etcheverry

Guillermo Jaim Etcheverry (born December 31, 1942) is an Argentinian physician and former rector of the Universidad de Buenos Aires (UBA).

Jaim Etcheverry achieved his M.D. in 1965 and his Ph.D. in 1972, both at the School of Medicine of the University of Buenos Aires. He committed to teaching and full-time research in the field of Neurobiology and became the Principal Investigator of the Argentine National Council of Research (CONICET) until 2012. He worked as a full-time professor and director of the Department of Cell Biology and Histology of the School of Medicine of the University of Buenos Aires until 2008.

From 1986 to 1990, he was dean of the School of Medicine. He carried out his postgraduate work in Basel, Switzerland, and later received the John Simon Guggenheim Memorial Foundation Fellowship to work at the Salk Institute, La Jolla, California, in 1978. He is a member of the Academy of Medical Sciences of Córdoba, the National Academy of Education (holding the Pedro Scalabrini seat), the National Academy of Sciences of Buenos Aires, and the Argentine Academy of Arts and Sciences of Communication.

Apart from his many scientific papers and book chapters on his original research, in 1999, he published La Tragedia Educativa, a book on the state of education. He regularly writes about culture and education in major Argentine newspapers and frequently has spoken on these subjects when invited by various social organizations. In 2002, he was elected rector of the University of Buenos Aires for a period of four years. He received several distinctions, notably from organisations like the Pew Research Center's Latin American Program, the Fulbright Commission Argentina, and the former Antorchas Foundation.

He was named Master of Argentine Medicine in 2001. Then, in 2004, he was elected as a Foreign Honorary Member by the American Academy of Arts and Sciences. From 2005 to 2011, he chaired the Latin American and Caribbean Fellowships Selection Committee of the John Simon Guggenheim Memorial Foundation. He also received the Konex Award in Science and Technology. He was named Chevalier dans l’Ordre des Palmes Académiques by the French Republic and, between 2006 and 2012, he chaired the Fundación Carolina of Argentina, involved in the educational and scientific cooperation between Spain and Latin America.

In 2007, he received the Médaille d’Or from the “Société d’Encouragement au Progrès” in Paris, France. In 2009, he received an Honoris Causa degree from the Universidad de Morón in Argentina. In 2010, he was awarded the Bicentennial Medal by the City of Buenos Aires, and the Santa Clara de Asís Prize in 2014 for his trajectory, as well as the Honoris Causa degree of the Universidad Nacional del Noroeste de la Provincia de Buenos Aires (UNNOBA).
