= Carlos Bielicki =

Argentine chess master (1940–2024)

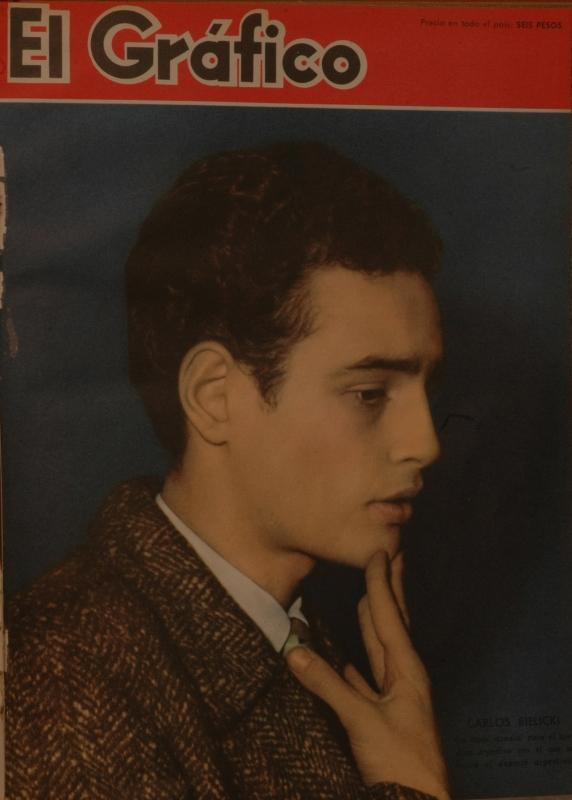
- Bielicki in 1959

Personal information
- Born: 15 May 1940
- Died: 9 September 2024 (aged 84)

Chess career
- Country: Argentina
- Title: International Master (1959)
- Peak rating: 2365 (April 2007)

Carlos Bielicki (15 May 1940 – 9 September 2024) was an Argentine chess master.

In 1958, he won the Argentine Junior Championship. In 1959, Bielicki was World Junior Chess Champion, winning the tournament in Münchenstein and earning the International Master title. In 1960, he took 11th at Mar del Plata (Boris Spassky and Bobby Fischer won). In 1961, he took 7th in Mar del Plata (Miguel Najdorf won). In 1961, he tied for 3rd–5th in the Argentine Chess Championship (Héctor Rossetto won). Bielicki died on 9 September 2024, at the age of 84.

== Notable game ==
B. Parma vs. C. Bielicki,
WC Junior 1959

Position: e1 white queen, d1 white rook, c1 white king, g2 white pawn, c2 white pawn, b2 white pawn, a2 white pawn, f3 white bishop, c3 white knight, h4 white pawn, d5 black pawn, c5 black queen, h6 black pawn, f6 white pawn, e6 black pawn, d6 black bishop, c6 black bishop, a6 black pawn, g7 white rook, f7 black pawn, d7 black rook, b7 black pawn, c8 black rook, b8 black king

Position after 25.h4

Bruno Parma vs. Carlos Bielicki, World Junior Chess Championship 1959. Sicilian Defence.
1.e4 c5 2.Nf3 d6 3.d4 cxd4 4.Nxd4 Nf6 5.Nc3 a6 6.Bg5 e6 7.Qf3 Bd7 8.0-0-0 Nc6 9.Qg3 Nxd4 10.Rxd4 Da5 11.Be2 Nc6 12.f4 h6 13.Bxf6 gxf6 14.Qh4 f5 15.exf5 Qxf5 16.Bd3 Qc5 17.f5 Be7 18.f6 Bf8 19.Be4 d5 20.Bf3 0-0-0 21.Rhd1 Rd7 22.Rg4 Kb8 23.Qe1 Bd6 24.Rg7 Rc8 25.h4 (diagram) d4 26.Ne4 Qxc2+ 27.Kxc2 Bxe4+ white resigns 0–1 because of 28.Kd2 Rc2 checkmate (or 28.Kb3 Bc2 checkmate)
