= José Rubinstein =

Argentine chess player

Simón José Rubinstein (21 January 1940 – 24 May 1997) was an Argentine chess master.

He won the Tucumán provincial championships in 1959 and with a perfect score in 1961; took 6th in the Argentine Chess Championship in 1961; took 6th at the 1962 masters tournament at the Kimberley club in Mar del Plata (Héctor Rossetto won); and took 5th at Mar del Plata 1962 (Torneo Latino-americano, Raimundo García won). He won a game against Bobby Fischer in a simultaneous exhibition at San Miguel de Tucumán in 1971.

== Legacy ==
The chess club Ajedrez Martelli celebrates, since 1999, a tournament in memory of Rubinstein.
