= Néstor Braunstein =

Argentine-Mexican physician (1941–2022)

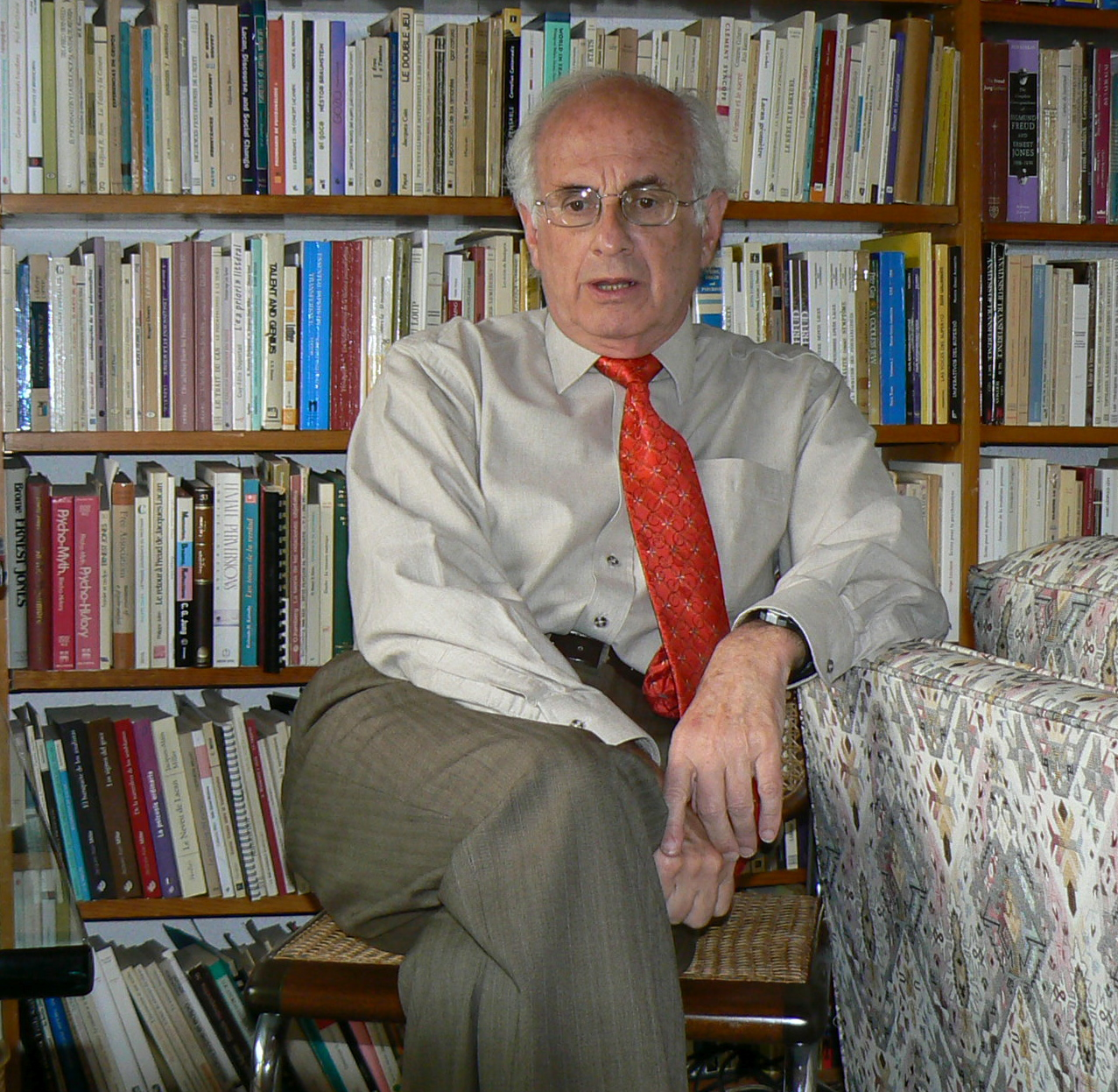
Braunstein in 2008

Néstor Alberto Braunstein (1941 – 7 September 2022) was an Argentine-Mexican physician, psychiatrist and psychoanalyst.

== Biography ==
Braunstein was born in Bell Ville. He graduated as a physician in 1962, at the age of 20, and received his M.D. in 1965 from the Universidad Nacional de Córdoba, Argentina, where he taught at college level as early as 1959. In 1974 he was forced into exile for political and academic reasons and moved to Mexico where he worked as a psychiatrist in different public institutions for the treatment of both children and adults. Braunstein was a naturalized citizen of Mexico. He was a studies professor, a practicing psychoanalyst and an active writer. Nestor Braunstein died on September 7, 2022, in Spain.

In 1978 he was banned from his duties and positions in all Mexican psychiatric institutions because of his critical epistemological views on the official taxonomies of the so-called mental illnesses (then DSM-III and CIE-10).

Immediately after arriving in Mexico he published (with some chapters written by Marcelo Pasternac, Frida Saal and Gloria Benedito): Psicología: Ideología y ciencia in which he demolishes academic psychology and denounces its conceit as a true science. Instead, Braunstein proposed psychoanalysis as an alternative and as a methodological tool to deal with human subjectivity and to redirect the study of psychology. The book had enormous success: 24 editions were printed between 1975 and 2008 (more than 70,000 copies sold). This work helped to change the ideological landscape in almost every school of psychology in Spanish speaking countries of Latin America and the author was invited to lecture about his ideas on psychology and psychoanalysis to commemorate the 20th, 25th and 30th anniversary of the first edition of the book.

In 1980 he published a pioneering book dealing with Lacanian psychoanalysis, the first to appear in Mexico, Psiquiatría, teoría del sujeto, psicoanálisis. (Hacia Lacan) which was also received with general acclaim; 14 editions were printed and is widely read, referred to and quoted. Beginning in 1981 he became the editor of a continuously reprinted series of books, Coloquios de la Fundación with 13 titles published that helped to expand the knowledge of Freudian and Lacanian psychoanalysis in Latin America.

Between 1975 and 2005 he taught Freudian and Lacanian psychoanalysis in the Graduate Studies Department of Clinical Psychology at the Facultad de Psicología of the Universidad Nacional Autónoma de México and since 2005 he has been teaching in the Facultad de Filosofía y Letras of that same institution. He was a member of the board and professor in the Ph.D. in Critical Theory of 17, Instituto de Estudios Críticos and Secretary of the Administrative Board of Siglo Veintiuno Editores .

In Mexico, he introduced Lacan's teachings by different means in different venues. He taught the first course devoted to Lacanian Studies (UNAM, 1977), published the first Mexican article on Lacan (Lust, Mexico, n° 1, 1979) and wrote the aforementioned book Psiquiatría, teoría del sujeto, psicoanálisis (Hacia Lacan. In 1980 he co-founded a pioneering institute devoted to the Lacanian clinic (Fundación Mexicana de Psicoanálisis). Braunstein was also the chairman and co-founder of the first officially recognized psychoanalytic teaching institution in the country (Centro de Investigaciones y Estudios Psicoanalíticos, 1982) where he taught until 2003.

He was active in the psychoanalytic lecturing circuit and gave both opening and closing lectures in several international symposiums including the following: Bogotá (Pontificia Universidad Javeriana, 1991) , Beijing (Psychoanalysis International Symposium, Peking University Health Science Center, Beijing April, 2001), Paris (Lacan, 100 ans, la Sorbonne, January 23, 2000), New York City (Columbia University and Fordham University, 1992 and 2008) Apres-Coup announcement of Columbia lectures, Madrid (Universidad Complutense, Master en Teoría Psicoanalítica 1993 and 1997) , Istanbul (Istanbul'da Psykanaliz, Etkinlikleri Sürüyor, September, 2001), Rome (Fondation Européennne pour la Psychanalyse, RSI /Eros-ion, Les peintures de Leonardo Cremonini, May, 1999) and Santiago (Universidad Andrés Bello. Mención Psicoanálisis, April 2000) .

Beginning in 1985, he traveled constantly to different cities of America and Europe imparting seminars on Lacanian psychoanalysis.

As a cultural journalist specializing in psychoanalysis, he wrote many articles for general and specialized Mexican newspapers (Excelsior, Uno Más Uno, Reforma, Este País, El Universal, Revista de la Universidad Nacional Autónoma de México). He was active as a member of the editorial boards in several psychoanalytic journals published in Spanish, French, Portuguese and English (see below) and he translated a number of literary and psychoanalytic texts into Spanish.

== Works and ideas ==
Braunstein recognized the following authors as the main influences on his thought: Jacques Lacan, Sigmund Freud, Friedrich Nietzsche, Louis Althusser, Jorge Luis Borges, Jacques Derrida, Slavoj Žižek and Giorgio Agamben.

His works dealt with a variety of subjects in terms of the relationship between psychoanalysis and culture: philosophy from Plato to Wittgenstein and Derrida; literature from Sophocles to Sebald and Christa Wolf; the visual arts; music; opera; film theater; history; theology; medicine; neuroscience; law; linguistics; anthropology; academic psychology; pedagogy; politics; psychiatry and daily life in the 21st century. In 2003 he turned his attention to the subject of memory, articulating the meaning and research on the ability to remember in psychoanalysis and its constant references (Sigmund Freud and Jacques Lacan) and those sources that can be derived from other disciplines such as literature, philosophy, history and neuroscience.

In his best known work Goce Jouissance. A Lacanian Concept, he argued that the nucleus that holds psychoanalytical clinic and theory together is the concept of jouissance, which can be minimally defined as "the ways in which a body is affected by language". In this sense he argued that psychoanalysis can be understood as a sort of science of jouissance in the speaking being, a sophisticated knowledge that has been carefully constructed, first by Freud, continued by Lacan and still ongoing.

In his last book published in French, Depuis Freud, Après Lacan (Ramonville, Érès, 2008) Braunstein posited his theory of three different periods in the history of psychoanalysis. They can be emblematically traced to the year 1900 (Freud's era, under the predominance of the discourse of the Master), 1950 (Lacan's times, under the hegemony of the discourse of the Capitalist) and our present age (year 2000), ruled by the omnipresent and anonymous discourse of the Markets.

== Death ==
Following several years of struggle with illness, Braunstein ended his life in his house in Barcelona on September 7, 2022.

== Books ==
- Co-author and editor of Psicología: Ideología y Ciencia, introduction by Marie Langer, with Marcelo Pasternac, Gloria Benedito and Frida Saal (Mexico, Siglo Veintiuno, 1975). ISBN 968-23-1732-0

- Psiquiatría, Teoría del Sujeto, Psicoanálisis (Hacia Lacan), (Mexico, Siglo Veintiuno, 1980). ISBN 968-23-0984-0

- La Clínica Psicoanalítica: de Freud a Lacan, (San José de Costa Rica, 1987). ISBN 9968-9721-0-X

- Goce (1990), México, Siglo Veintiuno, ISBN 968-23-1647-2. Translated into and published in French as La Jouissance: un concept lacanien, Paris, Point-Hors Ligne, 1992 ISBN 2-904821-39-2, 2ª edition, Ramonville, Érès, 2005 ISBN 2-7492-0474-7.

Published in Portuguese as: Gozo, São Paulo, Escuta, 2007. ISBN 978-85-7137-257-3, and currently being translated into English (Verso, 2001)

- El goce. Un concepto lacaniano, a complete rewriting of the previous title. (Buenos Aires, Siglo Veitino, 2006. ISBN 968-23-2634-6)

- Freudiano y Lacaniano, Buenos Aires, Manantial, 1994. ISBN 950-9515-88-4

- Por el camino de Freud, México, Siglo Veintiuno, 2001. ISBN 968-23-2310-X

- Ficcionario de Psicoanálisis, Mexico, Siglo Veintiuno, 2001. ISBN 968-23-2349-5

- ¿Hay una patología limítrofe?, Universidad Católica de Santiago de Guayaquil, Ecuador, 2005. ISBN 978-9978-331-58-3

- Memoria y espanto O el recuerdo de infancia, Mexico, Siglo Veintiuno, 2008. ISBN 978-968-23-2738-4

- Depuis Freud, Après Lacan. Déconstruction dans la psychanalyse, Ramonville, Érès, 2008. ISBN 978-2-7492-0855-8

- La memoria, la inventora Mexico, Siglo Veintiuno, 2008. ISBN 978-968-23-2757-5

- Cien años de novedad. La moral sexual “cultural” de Sigmund Freud 1908—2008, Mexico, Siglo Veintiuno, (co-author and co-editor with Betty Fuks).

- Cem anos de novedade. A moral sexual “cultural” de Sigmund Freud 1908—2008, Rio de Janeiro, Contracapa (2008, co-author and co-editor with Betty Fuks).

- La memoria del uno y la memoria del Otro, Mexico, Siglo Veintiuno, (to be released in 2009).

- El inconsciente, la técnica y el discurso capitalista, México: Siglo XXI, 2012. (195 pp.) ISBN 978-607-03-0352-4.

To be published in Paris, Au bord de l'eau, 2014. Translation by Ana Claudia Delgado Restrepo.

- La memoria del uno y la memoria del Otro Tercer volumen de la trilogía sobre la memoria. México: Siglo XXI, 2012. ISBN 978-607-03-0408-8.

- Traducir el psicoanálisis. Interpretación, sentido y transferencia. México, Paradiso, 2012. 222 pp. ISBN 978-607-95531-7-3.

- "The discourse of the markets or the discourse of psychoanalysis: a forced choice", in Ian Parker & David Pavón-Cuéllar (Editors), Lacan, Discourse, Event: New Psychoanalytic Approaches to Textual Indeterminacy. London: Routledge, 2013.

- "El discurso de los mercados o el discurso del psicoanálisis: una opción excluyente", en Ian Parker y David Pavón-Cuéllar (coordinadores), Lacan, discurso, acontecimiento: nuevos análisis de la indeterminación textual. México: Plaza y Valdés, 2013.

- “El psicoanálisis, por venir”. In: Martha Reynoso de Solís, coord., Historia del psicoanálisis en México. México, Museo Casa León Trotsky, 2012, pp. 231-244. ISBN 978-607-95961-1-8

- “Jaime Labastida: Pensador y poeta” In Revista de la UNAM, México, noviembre de 2012. Published as an Introduction in Jaime Labastida: En el centro del año Madrid, Salto de Página, 2013, pp. 7-20. ISBN 978-84-15065-42-5.

- Freud: Tótem y tabú 100 años después (1913-2013) Editor in Spanish –con Carina Basualdo y Betty Fuks) and coauthor. "Del Urvater al Big Brother". Siglo Veintiuno, México, 2013. ISBN 978-607-03-0472-9, pp. 76-99-
- In French: Totem et tabou. Cent ans après (1913-2013) (editors: Carina Basualdo, Néstor A. Braunstein y Betty Fuks). Author: “Le père primitif et le père digitalisé, ou De l’Urvater au Big Brother”, pp. 71-98. París, Le bord de l’eau. ISBN 978-2-35687-240-1)
- In Portuguese Totem e tabu, cem anos apos(editors: Betty Fuks, Néstor A. Braunstein y Carina Basualdo, Rio de Janeiro, Contracapa, 2013).

- Clasificar en psiquiatría. Crítica al DSM5 de la Asociación Psiquiátrica de los EEUU. Three editions in México, Siglo Veintiuno, 2013, ISBN 978-607-03-0465-1), Buenos Aires, Siglo Veintiuno (2013) and Madrid, Siglo Veintiuno y Biblioteca Nueva,2014, ISBN 978-84-9940-620-6)
- Psychanalyse et sculpture, trad. Jacques Nassif, Paris, Editions des Crépuscules, 2018

Braunstein was invited to write the chapter “Desire and Jouissance in Lacanian Teachings” in The Cambridge Companion to Lacan (Cambridge, London and Boston, 2003), Jean-Michel Rabaté (ed.). ISBN 0-521-80744-1 and ISBN 0-521-00203-6

Author of more than 230 papers on psychoanalysis, philosophy, art and culture published in specialized journals and magazines of America and Europe.

== Editorial work ==
- Member of the editorial board of Siglo XXI Editores, Mexico.

- Member of the board of Revista Científica Anuario de Investigaciones de la Facultad de Psicología de la Universidad de Buenos Aires, Argentina

- Member of the national advisory board of Devenires. Revista de Filosofía y Filosofía de la Cultura de la Universidad Michoacana de San Nicolás Hidalgo, Morelia, Michoacan, México.

- Member of the reading board of Savoirs et clinique. Revue de Psychanalyse. Lille, France, Ramonville, Érès.

- Member of the Comité Scientifique de La clinique lacanienne. Revue Internationale, Paris, New York, Buenos Aires, Rio de Janeiro.

- Dictaminating member of Perspectivas en Psicología, Revista de la Facultad de Psicología de la Universidad de Mar del Plata, Argentina.

- Collaborator in the editorial board of La Letra. Quito, Ecuador

- Member of the reading board of Encuentros. Publicación del Colegio de Psicólogos de la Provincia de Buenos Aires. Distrito XV.

- Foreign correspondent for Correspondences Freudiennes. Revue de Psychanalyse. Lyon and Besançon, France.

- Editorial consultant on psychotherapy and family. Revista de la Asociación Mexicana de Terapia Familiar A. C., Mexico, D. F.

- Member of the board of La nave de los locos, Morelia, Michoacan, Mexico.

- Mexican correspondent for ESP(a)CIO ANALÍTICO, Tucuman, Argentina.

- Mexican correspondent for the International Journal of Psychoanalysis of Social Sciences and Culture, Kent University, Ohio. Publisher: Critical Press, New York.

== Selected works ==
In German:

- Raúl Páramo Ortega: Freud in México - Zur Geschichte der Psychanalyse in México. Munich, Quintessenz, 1992, pp. 68, 87, 89-92, 119 ISBN 3-86128-135-X

In English:

- Jean-Michel Rabaté: Lacan in America. "Construing Lacanpp. XXI, XXXII, XXXIV and XXXVI, Erich D. Freiberger: The role of construction and deconstruction in Psicoanálisis and Ethic, p. 226. New York, Other Press, 2000. ISBN 1-892746-63-8

- James M. Mellard, Beyond Lacan, New York, State University of New York Press, 2006 pp. 49-50.

- Charles Edward Robins, New York Voices. The Trauma of 9/11. UIT an Introduction by Néstor A. Braunstein, New York, Psychosocial Press, 2004 ISBN 978-1-887841-56-6.

- Patricia Gherovici, The Puerto-Rican Síndrome. New York, Other Press, 2003, p. II and pp. 116-117.

- Jean Michel Rabaté, Jacques Lacan. Psychaoanalysis and the Subject of Literature. New York, Palgrave, 2001 ISBN 978-0-333-79305-3

- K. R. Malone and S. R. Friedlander (eds) The Subject of Lacan. A Lacanian Reader for Psychoanalysts. Mark Bracher: How Analysis Cures According to Lacan. New York, State University of New York Press, 2000, pp. 191, 195 and 205. ISBN 0-7914-4624-7

- Slavoj Žižek and Mladen Dolar, Opera’s Second Death. New York and London, 2002, p. 109 and 227. ISBN 0-415-93016-2 and ISBN 0-415-93017-0

- Spanish translation: Lacan Literario. La experiencia de la letra, México, Siglo Veintiuno, 2007. ISBN 968-23-2614-1

- Slavoj Žižek, The Plague of Fantasies, New York and London, Verso, 1997, p. 42. ISBN 1-85984-193-7 and 13: 978—185941938 (Spanish translation: Slavoj Žižek, El acoso de las fantasías, Mexico, Siglo Veintiuno, 1999, p. 44. ISBN 968-23-2166-2).

In French and Spanish:

- Paul-Laurent Assoun, Lacan, Coll. Que-sais je. París, Presses Univ. de France, 2003. Essential bibliography of Jacques Lacan.ISBN 2-13-053315-9 (Spanish translation: Buenos Aires, Amorrortu, 2004, ISBN 978-950-518-104-9)

In Portuguese:

- Betty B. Fuks, Freud e a cultura. Bibliografía recomendada. Rio de Janeiro, Jorge Zahar Editores, 2005, p. 69 ISBN 85-7110-723-8

In Spanish:

- José Milmaniene, La castración y sus vicisitudes, Buenos Aires, Kargieman, 1993, p. 87 ISBN 950-9493-33-3.

- Marta Gerez Ambertín, Imperativos del superyó. Testimonios clínicos. Buenos Aires, Lugar Editorial, 1999. ISBN 950-892-078-5

- José Luis Díaz, La conciencia viviente, México, Fondo de Cultura Económica, 2007. ISBN 978-968-16-8352-8

- Ruthellen Josselson, Irvin D. Yalom. La psicoterapia y la condición humana Prólogo por Néstor A. Braunstein, New York, Jorge Pinto Books, 2008. ISBN 0-9801147-4-8 and ISBN 978-0-9801147-4-4
