= Fernando Sorrentino =

Argentine writer

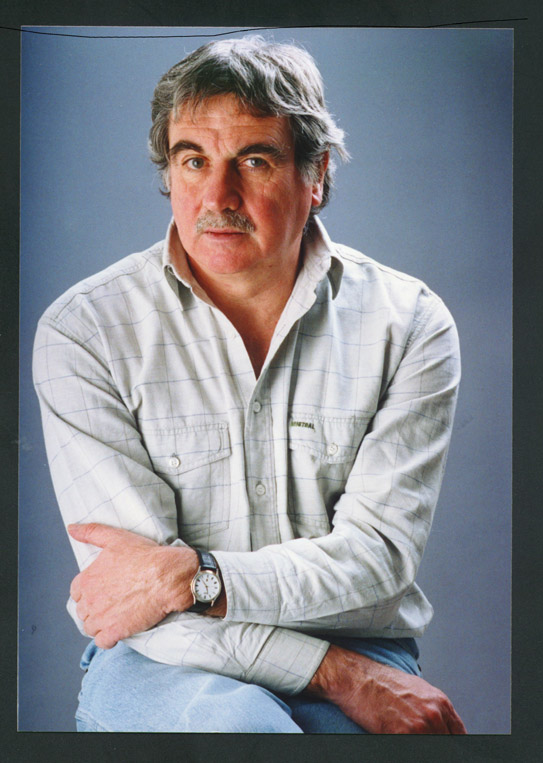
Fernando Sorrentino

Fernando Sorrentino (born November 8, 1942) is an Argentine writer. His works have been translated into many languages.

Sorrentino was born in Buenos Aires.

== Short stories ==
- La regresión zoológica, Buenos Aires, Editores Dos, 1969, 154 págs.
- Imperios y servidumbres, Barcelona, Editorial Seix Barral, 1972, 196 págs.; reedición, Buenos Aires, Torres Agüero Editor, 1992, 160 págs.
- El mejor de los mundos posibles, Buenos Aires, Editorial Plus Ultra, 1976, 208 págs.
- En defensa propia, Buenos Aires, Editorial de Belgrano, 1982, 128 págs.
- El rigor de las desdichas, Buenos Aires, Ediciones del Dock, 1994, 82 págs.
- La Corrección de los Corderos, y otros cuentos improbables, Buenos Aires, Editorial Abismo, 2002, 194 págs.
- Existe un hombre que tiene la costumbre de pegarme con un paraguas en la cabeza, Barcelona, Ediciones Carena, 2005, 356 págs.
- El regreso. Y otros cuentos inquietantes, Buenos Aires, Editorial Estrada, 2005, 80 págs.
- En defensa propia / El rigor de las desdichas, Buenos Aires, Editorial Los Cuadernos de Odiseo, 2005, 144 págs.
- Biblioteca Mínima de Opinión, Santa Cruz de la Sierra, Editora Opinión, 2007, 32 págs.
- Costumbres del alcaucil, Buenos Aires, Editorial Sudamericana, 2008, 64 págs.
- El crimen de san Alberto, Buenos Aires, Editorial Losada, 2008, 186 págs.
- El centro de la telaraña, y otros cuentos de crimen y misterio, Buenos Aires, Editorial Longseller, 2008, 64 págs. Nueva edición: El centro de la telaraña, y otros cuentos de crimen y misterio, Buenos Aires, Editorial Longseller, 2014, 96 págs.
- Paraguas, supersticiones y cocodrilos (Verídicas historias improbables), Veracruz (México), Instituto Literario de Veracruz, El Rinoceronte de Beatriz, 2013, 140 págs.
- Problema resuelto / Problem gelöst, edición bilingüe español/alemán, Düsseldorf, DUP (Düsseldorf University Press), 2014, 252 págs.
- Los reyes de la fiesta, y otros cuentos con cierto humor, Madrid, Apache Libros, 2015, 206 págs.

== Children and teenagers' literature ==
- Cuentos del Mentiroso, Buenos Aires, Editorial Plus Ultra, 1978, 96 págs. (Faja de Honor de la S.A.D.E. [Sociedad Argentina de Escritores]); reedición (con modificaciones), Buenos Aires, Grupo Editorial Norma, 2002, 140 págs.; nueva reedición (con nuevas modificaciones), Buenos Aires, Cántaro, 2012, 176 págs.
- El remedio para el rey ciego, Buenos Aires, Editorial Plus Ultra, 1984, 78 págs.
- El Mentiroso entre guapos y compadritos, Buenos Aires, Editorial Plus Ultra, 1994, 96 págs.
- La recompensa del príncipe, Buenos Aires, Editorial Stella, 1995, 160 págs.
- Historias de María Sapa y Fortunato, Buenos Aires, Editorial Sudamericana, 1995, 72 págs. (Premio Fantasía Infantil 1996); reedición: Ediciones Santillana, 2001, 102 págs.
- El Mentiroso contra las Avispas Imperiales, Buenos Aires, Editorial Plus Ultra, 1997, 120 págs.
- La venganza del muerto, Buenos Aires, Editorial Alfaguara, 1997, 92 págs.
- El que se enoja, pierde, Buenos Aires, Editorial El Ateneo, 1999, 56 págs.
- Aventuras del capitán Bancalari, Buenos Aires, Editorial Alfaguara, 1999, 92 págs.
- Cuentos de don Jorge Sahlame, Buenos Aires, Ediciones Santillana, 2001, 134 págs.
- El Viejo que Todo lo Sabe, Buenos Aires, Ediciones Santillana, 2001, 94 págs.
- Burladores burlados, Buenos Aires, Editorial Crecer Creando, 2006, 104 págs.
- La venganza del muerto [edición ampliada, contiene cinco cuentos: Historia de María Sapa; Relato de mis travesuras; La fortuna de Fortunato; Hombre de recursos; La venganza del muerto,], Buenos Aires, Editorial Alfaguara, 2011, 160 págs.

== Longer works ==
- Costumbres de los muertos, 1996
- Sanitarios centenarios, 1979 [tr. Sanitary Centennial: And Selected Short Stories, 1988]

== Nonfiction (Interviews & essays) ==
- Siete conversaciones con Jorge Luis Borges, 1974 [tr. by Clark M. Zlotchew, Seven Conversations With Jorge Luis Borges, 1982, 2010]
- Conversaciones con Jorge Luis Borges, 2017
- Siete conversaciones con Adolfo Bioy Casares, 1992, 2001, 2007
- El forajido sentimental. Incursiones por los escritos de Jorge Luis Borges, 2011

== Anthologies ==
- Treinta y cinco cuentos breves argentinos, 1973
- Treinta cuentos hispanoamericanos (1875-1975), 1976
- Cuentos argentinos de imaginación, 1974
- Treinta y seis cuentos argentinos con humor, 1976
- Diecisiete cuentos fantásticos argentinos, 1978.
- Nosotros contamos cuentos, 1987
- Historias improbables. Antología del cuento insólito argentino, 2007
- Ficcionario argentino (1840-1940). Cien años de narrativa: de Esteban Echeverría a Roberto Arlt, 2012
- Cincuenta cuentos clásicos argentinos. De Juan María Gutiérrez a Enrique González Tuñón, 2016
