= Liliana Heker =

Argentine writer (born 1943)

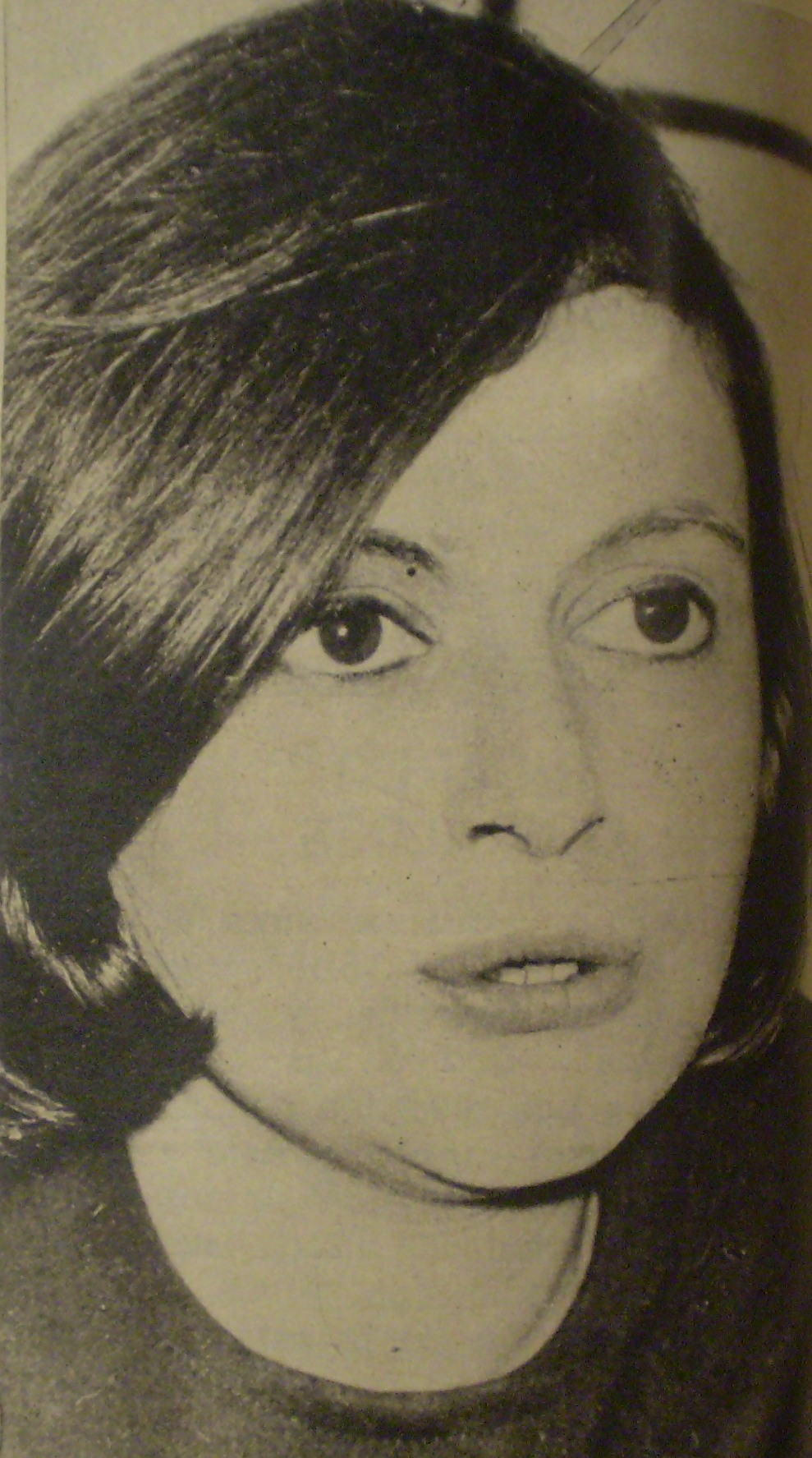
Liliana Heker

Liliana Heker (born in Almagro, Buenos Aires, 1943) is an Argentine writer of Russian Jewish and Ukrainian descent. She wrote and edited left-wing literary journals during the Dictatorship in the 1970s and 1980s, using veiled critiques as a means of protest and engaging in vigorous debate with exiled writers such as Julio Cortázar.

She grew up attending her low-income neighborhood's public schools, and went on to study physics at Universidad de Buenos Aires in the 1960s.

Her professional writing started at the age of 17 with the publication of her short story 'Los Juegos' in Abelardo Castillo's literary magazine El grillo de papel (The Paper Cricket). She would continue working with Castillo for years, founding the magazine El Escarabajo de Oro alongside him in 1961 and El Ornitorrinco in 1977. The magazines were known for publishing left-wing literature and mainting strong opposition to the military regime.

She published her first short story collection, Los que vieron la zarza in 1966, which was awarded the Casa de las Américas prize. In 1967, she received an honor from the Society of Argentinian Writers (SADE).

In 1987 she wrote her first novel, Zona de Clivaje, which received the Primer Premio Municipal de Novela. In total, she has released six short-story collections, two novels, and two non-fiction collections. She was given the award Personalidad Destacada en el ámbito de la cultura in 2023 by the city of Buenos Aires.

== Works ==
=== Novels ===
- Zona de clivaje (1990)
- El fin de la historia (1996)

=== Short Story Collections ===
- Los que vieron la zarza (1966)
- Acuario (1972)
- Un resplandor que se apagó en el mundo (1977)
- Las peras del mal (1982)
- Los bordes de lo real (1991)
- La crueldad de la vida (2001)

=== Non-fiction ===
- Las hermanas de Shakespeare (1999)
- Diálogos sobre la vida y la muerte (2003)

== Awards ==
- 1967: honor from the Society of Argentinian Writers (SADE)
- 2010: Premio a la trayectoria Esteban Echeverría
- 2014: Premio Konex de Platino
- 2018: Premio Nacional de Literatura (Cuentos)
- 2023: Personalidad Destacada en el ámbito de la cultura
