= Angel Balzarino =

Argentine writer

Angel Balzarino (August 4, 1943 – June 9, 2018) was an Argentine writer. During his lifetime, beginning in 1968; he published several novellas and a dozen books of stories.

== Major works ==
- El Hombre que Tenía Miedo (stories), Ediciones E.R.A. (1974) No ISBN
- Las Otras Manos (stories), Editorial Colmegna (1987) ISBN 950-535-118-6
- Hombres y Hazañas, Fondo Editorial Municipal (1995) ISBN 950-99393-2-3
- Mariel Entre Nosotros, El Francotirador Ediciones (1998) ISBN 950-8502-35-5
