= Yerahmiel Barylka =

Argentine rabbi

Yerahmiel Barylka (Hebrew: ירחמיאל ברילקה; born 1943) is an Argentine-born Orthodox rabbi, lawyer, author, educator, journalist and lecturer. He has been living in Israel since 1993.

== Education ==
He studied in the yeshivot (rabbinical seminaries) Ateret tzvi and Chafetz Chaim, and in the Law and Social Sciences faculty of the University of Belgrano, in Buenos Aires, Argentina, where he served as an assistant professor of public international law. Barylka was born in Buenos Aires. He completed his rabbinical studies at the seminary Tiferet Yisrael in New York City.

== Career ==
When Barylka was seventeen years old he began his early career as an educator, heading the Heichal Hatorah Jewish Religious School. He taught at the Institute of Jewish Studies (Machon Lelimudey Haiadut) and directed the Talpiot and Joseph Caro Jewish Schools in Buenos Aires, and Yavneh and Hebrew Teachers' Seminar in Mexico City. He also directed the CEJ, the Centro de Estudios Judaicos, the representative office of the Weizmann Institute of Science and the Community Magen David. In 1993 he moved to Israel where he served as rabbi and director of religious activities of KKL-JNF, the Jewish National Fund.

== Books and Published Articles ==
- "Rationalized Catalogue" of the Jewish Museum of Buenos Aires (1975)
- Tengo derecho a la vida (1984)
- Judaísmo Temas Escogidos (1987)
- Matrimonio Mixto (1986, 1988)
- La plegaria judía (1990)
- Exogamia, diagnóstico y prevención (2002)

Some of the works published by Barylka are:

- "Multi-religious, inter-religious concordance and fundamentalism dissipation - to a political speech, religious, educational and cultural integration and difference (XVII Conference at the Hispano-Israeli Symposium (Judeo-Christian) in Segovia and Madrid) in El Olivo XXV, 54 (2001) - Madrid;
- regular contributions in the "Journal of Jewish Studies" on Judaism, Jews, Israel, and Zionism, Mexico;
- Chaim Weizmann, Life and Work, Weizmann Institute, Mexico;
- Barylka was the editor of the series on Parashat Hashavua Darjei Noam (weekly reading of the Bible) and wrote 100 reviews on the Yavneh School Bible - D. F., Mexico.

Barylka served as coordinator of support services to small Jewish communities in Latin America. Lecturer at the First International Congress of Thanatology in Mexico, D. F. Participated in the First World Congress in Jerusalem about Jewish Demography, 1982; He was a participant in the Conference XVII Symposium Hispano-Israeli (Jewish-Christian) Segovia and Madrid, 1998; Participant in the Hispano-Israeli Symposium XIX. In the Cardenal Herrera-CEU University, Moncada (Valencia), Spain, with the paper "Educate your children in time of un-schooling and family crisis", 2000. He has served also as a correspondent for the Middle East in Focus - Red Nucleo Radio Mil - Mexico (1998 to September 2009), the Middle East Correspondent - TV Mas - Radio and Television - Xalapa - Veracruz - Mexico (from 1998 to 2004), Director of the Journal of Jewish Studies on Judaism, Jews, Israel and Zionism in Mexico and Director of Link Magazine - Weizmann Institute of Science (Mexico) (1988–1992). Barylka is regularly consulted about the Jewish religion, the situation in Israel, and education of the young Jewish generation particularly in Latin American countries.
