= Miguel Lunghi =

Argentine politician

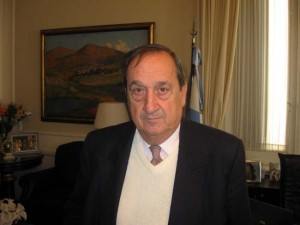
Miguel Ángel Lunghi

Miguel Ángel Lunghi (born December 6, 1943) is an Argentine Radical Civic Union (UCR) politician, paediatrician and mayor of Tandil, where he was born.

At the age of 18 Lunghi joined the UCR political party. He studied pediatrics at the Universidad Nacional de La Plata and practised pediatrics for 35 years while also acting as Health Director of Tandil city between 1983 and 1987. In 1987 he left the post of Health Director and became a city councillor until 1991.

As a paediatrician he has been the President of Tandil Medics between 1991 and 1998, when he became an auditor of the Italian Society of Tandil. In 2003 Lunghi was elected as Mayor of Tandil. On October 28, 2007 he was re-elected for a period of 4 years. (in Spanish)
