= Feminaria =

Feminist theory magazine published in Buenos Aires, Argentina (1988-2007)

- Categories: Feminist theory
- Frequency: 1-3 issues/year
- Founder: Lea Fletcher
- First issue: July 1988
- Final issue Number: April 2007; 31
- Company: Feminaria Editora
- Country: Argentina
- Based in: Buenos Aires
- Language: Spanish
- ISSN: 1666-2792
- OCLC: 19702222

Feminaria was a feminist theory magazine published in Buenos Aires, Argentina from 1988 to 2007. It included essays, bibliographies, notes, interviews, and sections on women and the media.

Its literary criticism section came to form another magazine called Feminaria Literaria, and was devoted to the theory and critique of women's literature, especially that of Latin America.

In 2008, on the occasion of Feminaria's 20th anniversary, the City Legislature declared it to be "of Social and Cultural Interest of the Autonomous City of Buenos Aires."

== History ==
The magazine Feminaria was published in Buenos Aires from July 1988 to April 2007 with a total of thirty-one issues, at a frequency of one to three issues per year. Its last issue was published as "Year XVI, No. 30/31". Beginning in 1999, the numbers were doubled, published together once a year.

Feminaria's covers were drawn by Argentine artists and its backs were dedicated to humor.

As stated in every issue,

The name of our magazine comes from the title of the book of culture and wisdom of women who read and write, the protagonists of the novel Les Guérillères by Monique Wittig.

Feminaria is feminist but it is not limited to a single concept of feminism. It is published three times a year and any writing that is not sexist, racist, homophobic, or expressing another type of discrimination will be considered.

The magazine reserves the right to emancipate the language of any sexist element – for example, man as a synonym of humanity – in the articles presented.

We consider that the relationship between power and knowledge is also expressed through the exercise of language.

According to the Patagonian newspaper Río Negro, "Its disappearance meant the loss of an irreplaceable space for the studies and experiences of women."

In 2012, a Framework Agreement for Institutional Cooperation and Collaboration was signed between the Buenos Aires Ombudsman's Office and the Feminaria Library and Documentation Center for the purpose of the free use of the center's material by the Ombudsman's Office.

== Officers ==
- Director: Lea Fletcher
- Board of Directors: Diana Bellessi, Alicia Genzano, Diana Maffía, Jutta Marx
- Feminaria Literaria Board: Marcela Castro, Silvia Jurovietzky
- Translations: Márgara Averbach
- Cover Design: Tite Barbuzza

== Gender focus ==
The magazine had gender in its titles beginning in 1990, using terms such as Latin American gender history, gender perspective, gender relations, gender studies, gender violence, gender and technology, gender and science, gender and environment, gender and literature, gender and academics, and gender and desire.

The magazine devoted a large part of its publications to the analysis of writings that "are not sexist, racist, homophobic, or expressing another type of discrimination," and to the diffusion of contemporary currents on gender.

== Feminaria Editora ==
The publishing house Feminaria Editora debuted in 1992 with the translation of the book Feminismo/postmodernismo by Linda Nicholson. It went on to publish some twenty titles by writers such as Ursula K. Le Guin, Diana Bellessi, Giulia Colaizzi, Haydée Birgin, Francine Masiello, and Isabel Monzón.

== Biblioteca Feminaria ==
The Tierra Violeta Cultural Center's Library Consortium houses the Feminaria Editora fund and the complete collection of Feminaria Magazine, along with the Catholic Library for the Right to Decide and the personal libraries of renowned Argentine feminists such as Lea Fletcher, Lili Soza de Newton, and Diana Maffía.
